= Athletics at the 1924 Summer Olympics – Men's 200 metres =

Men's 200 metres at the Games of the VIII Olympiad
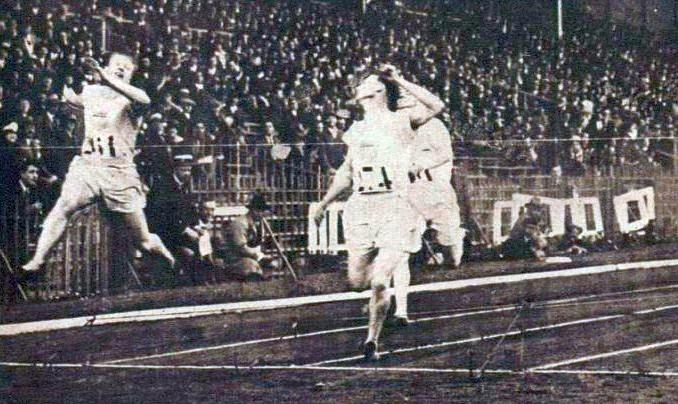
- The finish of the final, with Charley Paddock (left) in second, Jackson Scholz winning, and Eric Liddell (behind) in third.
- Venue: Stade Olympique Yves-du-Manoir
- Dates: 8 July 1924 (heats and quarterfinals); 9 July 1924 (semifinals and final)
- Competitors: 65 from 33 nations
- Winning time: 21.6 =OR

Medalists
1st place, gold medalist(s)		Jackson Scholz; United States
2nd place, silver medalist(s)		Charley Paddock; United States
3rd place, bronze medalist(s)		Eric Liddell; Great Britain

The men's 200 metres event was part of the track and field athletics programme at the 1924 Summer Olympics. The first two rounds were held on 8 July, with the semifinals and final on 9 July. Sixty-five sprinters from 33 countries competed. Nations were limited to 4 athletes each. The event was won by 0.1 seconds by Jackson Scholz of the United States, the nation's third consecutive victory in the event and fifth in six Games. For the third straight Games, the podium consisted of two Americans winning gold and silver (Charley Paddock) and a Briton taking bronze (Eric Liddell). Paddock, the silver medalist in 1920 as well, was the second man to earn multiple medals in the 200 metres.

== Background ==
This was the sixth appearance of the event, which was not held at the first Olympics in 1896 but has been on the program ever since. One of the six finalists from the 1920 Games returned: silver medalist Charley Paddock of the United States.

Argentina, Brazil, Haiti, Ireland, Latvia, Mexico, the Philippines, Poland, Turkey, and Yugoslavia each made their debut in the event. The United States made its sixth appearance, the only nation to have competed at each edition of the 200 metres to date.

== Competition format ==
The competition used the four round format introduced in 1920: heats, quarterfinals, semifinals, and a final. There were 17 heats of between 3 and 5 runners each, with the top 2 men in each advancing to the quarterfinals. The quarterfinals consisted of 6 heats of between 5 and 6 athletes each; the two fastest men in each heat advanced to the semifinals. There were 2 semifinals, each with 6 runners. In that round, the top three athletes advanced. The final had 6 runners.

The race was run on a 500-metre track, the last time the Olympics used a track with a different length than the now-standard 400 metres.

== Records ==
Prior to this competition, the existing world and Olympic records were as follows:

World record	Willie Applegarth (GBR)	21.2	London, United Kingdom	4 July 1914
Olympic record	Archie Hahn (USA)	21.6	St. Louis, United States	31 August 1904

Jackson Scholz of the United States tied the Olympic record in the final.

== Schedule ==
Date	Time	Round
Tuesday, 8 July 1924	14:30; 17:00	Heats; Quarterfinals
Wednesday, 9 July 1924	14:00; 15:45	Semifinals; Final

== Results ==
All times shown are in seconds.

=== Heats ===
The first round was held on 8 July. The first two runners of each heat qualified for the second round.

==== Heat 1 ====
Rank	Athlete	Nation	Time	Notes
1	Howard Kinsman	South Africa	21.8	Q
2	André Mourlon	France	21.8	Q
3	Pietro Pastorino	Italy	22.1	
4	James Hall	India	22.5	
5	José-María Larrabeiti	Spain	Unknown	

==== Heat 2 ====
Rank	Athlete	Nation	Time	Notes
1	Bayes Norton	United States	21.8	Q
2	Cyril Coaffee	Canada	21.8	Q
3	Carlos Garces	Mexico	Unknown	
4	Félix Mendizábal	Spain	Unknown	
5	Fritz Bürger	Austria	Unknown	

==== Heat 3 ====
Rank	Athlete	Nation	Time	Notes
1	Eric Liddell	Great Britain	22.2	Q
2	Rudolf Rauch	Austria	22.6	Q
3	Joseph Hilger	Luxembourg	Unknown	
4	Herminio Ahumada	Mexico	Unknown	
5	Emilio Casanovas	Argentina	Unknown	

==== Heat 4 ====
Rank	Athlete	Nation	Time	Notes
1	Arthur Porritt	New Zealand	22.4	Q
2	Larry Armstrong	Canada	Unknown	Q
3	Karl Borner	Switzerland	Unknown	
4	Lauri Härö	Finland	Unknown	
5	Artūrs Gedvillo	Latvia	Unknown	

==== Heat 5 ====
Rank	Athlete	Nation	Time	Notes
1	Henricus Broos	Netherlands	22.6	Q
2	George Dunston	South Africa	Unknown	Q
3	Paul Hammer	Luxembourg	Unknown	
4	Mogens Truelsen	Denmark	Unknown	
5	Oto Seviško	Latvia	Unknown	

==== Heat 6 ====
Rank	Athlete	Nation	Time	Notes
1	Jackson Scholz	United States	22.4	Q
2	George Hester	Canada	Unknown	Q
3	Terence Pitt	India	Unknown	
4	Pierre Parrain	France	Unknown	
5	Reijo Halme	Finland	Unknown	

==== Heat 7 ====
Rank	Athlete	Nation	Time	Notes
1	Slip Carr	Australia	22.6	Q
2	Bill Lowe	Ireland	23.0	Q
3	Jan de Vries	Netherlands	23.2	
4	Antonín Svoboda	Czechoslovakia		

==== Heat 8 ====
Rank	Athlete	Nation	Time	Notes
1	John McKechenneay	Canada	23.2	Q
2	Roy Norman	Australia	Unknown	Q
3	Alexandros Papafingos	Greece	Unknown	
4	Alois Linka	Czechoslovakia	Unknown	
5	Wilfred Hildreth	India	Unknown	

==== Heat 9 ====
Rank	Athlete	Nation	Time	Notes
1	Wilfred Nichol	Great Britain	22.6	Q
2	Ferenc Gerő	Hungary	Unknown	Q
3	José Martínez	Mexico	Unknown	
4	Christiaan Steyn	South Africa	Unknown	
5	Rauf Hasağası	Turkey	Unknown	

==== Heat 10 ====
Rank	Athlete	Nation	Time	Notes
1	Harold Abrahams	Great Britain	22.2	Q
2	Charley Paddock	United States	22.3	Q
3	Gentil dos Santos	Portugal	23.0	
4	Johannes van Kampen	Netherlands	23.1	
5	Diego Ordóñez	Spain		

==== Heat 11 ====
Rank	Athlete	Nation	Time	Notes
1	Paul Brochart	Belgium	23.0	Q
2	Konstantinos Pantelidis	Greece	Unknown	Q
3	Stanko Perpar	Yugoslavia	Unknown	
4	Leo Jørgensen	Denmark	Unknown	
5	Walter Strebi	Switzerland	Unknown	

==== Heat 12 ====
Rank	Athlete	Nation	Time	Notes
1	Lajos Kurunczy	Hungary	22.6	Q
2	Sasago Tani	Japan	Unknown	Q
3	Gvido Jekals	Latvia	Unknown	
4	Poul Schiang	Denmark	Unknown	
5	Hirsch Drisin	Finland	Unknown	

==== Heat 13 ====
Rank	Athlete	Nation	Time	Notes
1	George Hill	United States	22.0	Q
2	Thomas Matthewman	Great Britain	21.0	Q
3	Alvaro de Oliveira	Brazil	Unknown	
4	Aleksander Szenajch	Poland	Unknown	
5	Mariano Aguilar	Mexico	Unknown	

==== Heat 14 ====
Rank	Athlete	Nation	Time	Notes
1	Joseph Jackson	France	22.8	Q
2	Félix Escobar	Argentina	23.0	Q
3	Zygmunt Weiss	Poland	23.4	
4	Ville Ritola	Finland	Unknown	
5	Bohus Fleischer	Czechoslovakia	Unknown	

==== Heat 15 ====
Rank	Athlete	Nation	Time	Notes
1	Maurice Degrelle	France	22.6	Q
2	Marinus van den Berge	Netherlands	Unknown	Q
3	David Nepomuceno	Philippines	Unknown	
4	Lawrence Beets	South Africa	Unknown	
5	Henricus Cockuyt	Belgium	Unknown	

==== Heat 16 ====
Rank	Athlete	Nation	Time	Notes
1	Sean Lavan	Ireland	23.2	Q
2	Juan Junquera	Spain	Unknown	Q
3	Reinhold Kesküll	Estonia	Unknown	
4	Narciso Valdares Costa	Brazil	Unknown	
5	Karel Pott	Portugal	Unknown	

==== Heat 17 ====
Rank	Athlete	Nation	Time	Notes
1	Valéry Théard	Haiti	23.6	Q
2	Jānis Oja	Latvia	Unknown	Q
3	Johannes Brock	Denmark	Unknown	
4	Fortunato Catalon	Philippines	Unknown	
5	Mohamed Burhan	Turkey	Unknown	

=== Quarterfinals ===
The quarterfinals were held on 8 July. The first two runners of each heat qualified for the semifinals.

==== Quarterfinal 1 ====
Rank	Athlete	Nation	Time	Notes
1	Charley Paddock	United States	22.2	Q
2	Wilfred Nichol	Great Britain	22.6	Q
3	George Dunston	South Africa	Unknown	
4	Jānis Oja	Latvia	Unknown	
5	Rudolf Rauch	Austria	Unknown	

==== Quarterfinal 2 ====
Rank	Athlete	Nation	Time	Notes
1	Slip Carr	Australia	21.8	Q
2	Eric Liddell	Great Britain	Unknown	Q
3	Joseph Jackson	France	Unknown	
4	Sean Lavan	Ireland	Unknown	
5	John MacKechenneay	Canada	Unknown	
6	Juan Junquera	Spain	Unknown	

==== Quarterfinal 3 ====
Rank	Athlete	Nation	Time	Notes
1	Jackson Scholz	United States	21.8	Q
2	Cyril Coaffee	Canada	Unknown	Q
3	Sasago Tani	Japan	Unknown	
4	Valéry Théard	Haiti	Unknown	
5	Roy Norman	Australia	Unknown	
6	Konstantinos Pantelidis	Greece	Unknown	

==== Quarterfinal 4 ====
Rank	Athlete	Nation	Time	Notes
1	Harold Abrahams	Great Britain	22.0	Q
2	Bayes Norton	United States	22.3	Q
3	Maurice Degrelle	France	22.4	
4	Ferenc Gerő	Hungary	22.4	
5	Laurence Armstrong	Canada	Unknown	
6	Félix Escobar	Argentina	Unknown	

==== Quarterfinal 5 ====
Rank	Athlete	Nation	Time	Notes
1	Arthur Porritt	New Zealand	22.0	Q
2	André Mourlon	France	22.1	Q
3	Lajos Kurunczy	Hungary	Unknown	
4	Thomas Matthewman	Great Britain	Unknown	
5	Bill Lowe	Ireland	Unknown	
6	Marinus van den Berge	Netherlands	Unknown	

==== Quarterfinal 6 ====
Rank	Athlete	Nation	Time	Notes
1	George Hill	United States	21.8	Q
2	Howard Kinsman	South Africa	Unknown	Q
3	Paul Brochart	Belgium	Unknown	
4	George Hester	Canada	Unknown	
5	Henricus Broos	Netherlands	Unknown	

=== Semifinals ===
The semifinals were held on 9 July. The first three runners from each semifinal qualified for the final.

==== Semifinal 1 ====
Rank	Athlete	Nation	Time	Notes
1	Jackson Scholz	United States	21.8	Q
2	George Hill	United States	21.8	Q
3	Harold Abrahams	Great Britain	21.9	Q
4	Slip Carr	Australia	22.1	
5	Wilfred Nichol	Great Britain	22.4	
6	Arthur Porritt	New Zealand	22.6	

==== Semifinal 2 ====
Rank	Athlete	Nation	Time	Notes
1	Charley Paddock	United States	21.8	Q
2	Eric Liddell	Great Britain	21.8	Q
3	Bayes Norton	United States	22.1	Q
4	André Mourlon	France	22.2	
5	Howard Kinsman	South Africa	22.3	
6	Cyril Coaffee	Canada	22.4	

=== Final ===
The final was held on 9 July.

Rank	Lane	Athlete	Nation	Time	Notes
1st place, gold medalist(s)	4	Jackson Scholz	United States	21.6	=OR
2nd place, silver medalist(s)	6	Charley Paddock	United States	21.7	
3rd place, bronze medalist(s)	5	Eric Liddell	Great Britain	21.9	
4	1	George Hill	United States	22.0	
5	3	Bayes Norton	United States	22.0	
6	2	Harold Abrahams	Great Britain	22.3	
