= Athletics at the 1924 Summer Olympics – Men's 100 metres =

Men's 100 metres at the Games of the VIII Olympiad
- Venue: Stade Olympique Yves-du-Manoir
- Dates: 6 July 1924 (heats and quarterfinals); 7 July 1924 (semifinals and final)
- Competitors: 86 from 34 nations
- Winning time: 10.6

Medalists
1st place, gold medalist(s)		Harold Abrahams; Great Britain
2nd place, silver medalist(s)		Jackson Scholz; United States
3rd place, bronze medalist(s)		Arthur Porritt; New Zealand

Official Video

The men's 100 metres event was part of the track and field athletics programme at the 1924 Summer Olympics. This race was depicted in the film Chariots of Fire. The first two rounds were held on 6 July, with the semifinals and final on 7 July. Eighty-six sprinters from 34 countries competed. The event was won by Harold Abrahams of Great Britain—Great Britain's first Olympic gold medal in the men's 100 metres and only the second time that the United States failed to win (Reggie Walker of South Africa had won in 1908). Jackson Scholz kept the Americans on the podium with a silver. Arthur Porritt won the bronze, New Zealand's first medal in the event.

Chariots of Fire presents a fictionalized version of the event in which Eric Liddell, a devout Christian, dropped out shortly before the competition because the heat was on Sunday, and his faith compelled him to keep Sunday as the Sabbath. While the basic story is accurate, the true timeline was less dramatic, as "Liddell knew about the Olympic schedule several months in advance and never intended to run the 100 in Paris."

== Background ==
This was the seventh time the event was held, having appeared at every Olympics since the first in 1896. For the first time (excluding the 1906 Intercalated Games), a defending gold medalist (Charley Paddock) attempted to retain his title. Two other 1920 finalists, Loren Murchison and Jackson Scholz, also returned. Other notable entrants included Great Britain's Harold Abrahams, a favorite along with Paddock.

Argentina, Brazil, Ecuador, Estonia, Haiti, Ireland (newly independent from Great Britain), Latvia, Mexico, the Philippines, Poland, and Turkey were represented in the event for the first time. The United States was the only nation to have appeared at each of the first seven Olympic men's 100 metres events.

== Competition format ==
The event retained the four round format from 1920: heats, quarterfinals, semifinals, and a final. There were 17 heats, of 3–6 athletes each, with the top 2 in each heat advancing to the quarterfinals. The 34 quarterfinalists were placed into 6 heats of 5 or 6 athletes. Again, the top 2 advanced. There were 2 heats of 6 semifinalists, this time with the top 3 advancing to the 6-man final.

== Records ==
Prior to this competition, the existing world and Olympic records were as follows:

World record	Charles Paddock (USA)	10.4 s	Redlands, United States	23 April 1921
Olympic record	Donald Lippincott (USA)	10.6 s	Stockholm, Sweden	6 July 1912

No new records were set in 1924, though Harold Abrahams equalled the Olympic record three times.

== Results ==
All times shown are in seconds.

=== Heats ===
The first round was held on 6 July. The first two runners of each heat qualified for the second round.

==== Heat 1 ====
Rank	Athlete	Nation	Time	Notes
1	Loren Murchison	United States	10.8	Q
2	Arthur Porritt	New Zealand	10.9	Q
3	Camilo Rivas	Argentina		
4	Mariano Aguilar	Mexico		
5	Alberto Jurado	Ecuador		

==== Heat 2 ====
Rank	Athlete	Nation	Time	Notes
1	Cyril Coaffee	Canada	11.0	Q
2	Ernesto Bonacina	Italy	11.2	Q
3	Mogens Truelsen	Denmark		
4	Gentil dos Santos	Portugal		
5	Alois Linka	Czechoslovakia	11.6	

==== Heat 3 ====
Rank	Athlete	Nation	Time	Notes
1	Charles Paddock	United States	11.2	Q
2	Oto Seviško	Latvia	11.8	Q
3	Ferdinand Kaindl	Austria		
4	Leo Jørgensen	Denmark		
5	Fortunato Catalon	Philippines		
6	Bohus Fleischer	Czechoslovakia		

==== Heat 4 ====
Rank	Athlete	Nation	Time	Notes
1	Maurice Degrelle	France	11.0	Q
2	Reijo Halme	Finland	11.1	Q
3	Frederik Lamp	Netherlands		
4	Fritz Schedl	Austria		
5	Władysław Dobrowolski	Poland	11.5	
6	Rauf Hasağası	Turkey		

==== Heat 5 ====
Rank	Athlete	Nation	Time	Notes
1	Lajos Kurunczy	Hungary	11.4	Q
2	Johans Oja	Latvia		Q
3	Henricus Cockuyt	Belgium		
4	Wilfred Hildreth	India		
5	Lawrence Betts	South Africa		
6	Stanko Perpar	Yugoslavia		

==== Heat 6 ====
Rank	Athlete	Nation	Time	Notes
1	Henricus Broos	Netherlands	11.0	Q
2	George Dunston	South Africa	11.2	Q
3	Antonín Svoboda	Czechoslovakia	11.3	
4	Poul Schiang	Denmark	11.5	
5	José-María Larrabeiti	Spain	11.6	
6	David Nepomuceno	Philippines		

==== Heat 7 ====
Rank	Athlete	Nation	Time	Notes
1	Lancelot Royle	Great Britain	11.0	Q
2	Giovanni Frangipane	Italy	11.1	Q
3	André Théard	Haiti	11.2	
4	Juan Junqueras	Spain	11.3	
5	Zygmunt Weiss	Poland	11.4	

==== Heat 8 ====
Rank	Athlete	Nation	Time	Notes
1	Walter Rangeley	Great Britain	11.0	Q
2	Marinus van den Berge	Netherlands	11.1	Q
3	Diego Ordóñez	Spain		
4	Victor Moriaud	Switzerland		
5	Karel Pott	Portugal		
6	Miguel Enrico	Argentina		

==== Heat 9 ====
Rank	Athlete	Nation	Time	Notes
1	Albert Heisé	France	11.2	Q
2	Gusztáv Rózsahegyi	Hungary	11.3	Q
3	Lauri Härö	Finland	11.3	
4	Curt Wiberg	Sweden	11.4	
5	Alexandros Papafingos	Greece		

==== Heat 10 ====
Rank	Athlete	Nation	Time	Notes
1	Wilfred Nichol	Great Britain	11.0	Q
2	Paul Brochart	Belgium	11.1	Q
3	Laurence Armstrong	Canada		
4	Konstantinos Pantelidis	Greece		
5	Gvido Jekals	Latvia		

==== Heat 11 ====
Rank	Athlete	Nation	Time	Notes
1	Chester Bowman	United States	11.0	Q
2	Walter Strebi	Switzerland	11.2	Q
3	James Hall	India	11.3	
4	Bror Österdahl	Sweden	11.3	
5	Félix Escobar	Argentina		
6	Herminio Ahumada	Mexico		

==== Heat 12 ====
Rank	Athlete	Nation	Time	Notes
1	George Hester	Canada	11.2	Q
2	Johannes van Kampen	Netherlands	11.2	Q
3	Karl Borner	Switzerland		
4	Bill Lowe	Ireland		
5	László Muskát	Hungary		
–	Eugène Moedbeck	Belgium	DQ	

==== Heat 13 ====
Rank	Athlete	Nation	Time	Notes
1	Jackson Scholz	United States	10.8	Q
2	Paul Hammer	Luxembourg	11.3	Q
3	Terence Pitt	India	11.3	
4	Knut Russell	Sweden	11.3	
5	Reinhold Kesküll	Estonia	11.5	

==== Heat 14 ====
Rank	Athlete	Nation	Time	Notes
1	Harold Abrahams	Great Britain	11.0	Q
2	Slip Carr	Australia	11.0	Q
3	Sasago Tani	Japan		
4	Anton Husgafvel	Finland		
5	Álvaro Ribeiro	Brazil		
6	Şekip Engineri	Turkey		

==== Heat 15 ====
Rank	Athlete	Nation	Time	Notes
1	André Mourlon	France	11.0	Q
2	Enrico Torre	Italy	11.2	Q
3	Joseph Hilger	Luxembourg		

==== Heat 16 ====
Rank	Athlete	Nation	Time	Notes
1	Félix Mendizábal	Spain	11.4	Q
2	Anthony Vince	Canada	11.4	Q
3	Vittorio Zucca	Italy	11.5	
4	Stanisław Sośnicki	Poland	11.6	
5	Artūrs Gedvillo	Latvia		

==== Heat 17 ====
Rank	Athlete	Nation	Time	Notes
1	Ferenc Gerő	Hungary	11.0	Q
2	René Mourlon	France	11.0	Q
3	Väinö Eskola	Finland	11.1	
4	Aleksander Szenajch	Poland		
5	Christiaan Steyn	South Africa		
6	Aleksa Spahic	Yugoslavia		

=== Quarterfinals ===
The quarterfinals were held on 6 July. The first two runners of each heat qualified for the semifinals.

==== Quarterfinal 1 ====
Rank	Athlete	Nation	Time	Notes
1	Loren Murchison	United States	10.8	Q
2	Giovanni Frangipane	Italy	11.0	Q
3	Henricus Broos	Netherlands	11.1	
4	Paul Hammer	Luxembourg	11.1	
5	Reijo Halme	Finland	11.1	
6	Anthony Vince	Canada		

==== Quarterfinal 2 ====
Rank	Athlete	Nation	Time	Notes
1	Chester Bowman	United States	10.8	Q
2	Arthur Porritt	New Zealand	10.9	Q
3	Walter Rangeley	Great Britain	11.0	
4	René Mourlon	France	11.0	
5	Lajos Kurunczy	Hungary	11.0	
6	Enrico Torre	Italy		

==== Quarterfinal 3 ====
Rank	Athlete	Nation	Time	Notes
1	Cyril Coaffee	Canada	10.8	Q
2	Wilfred Nichol	Great Britain	11.0	Q
3	André Mourlon	France	11.1	
4	Marinus van den Berge	Netherlands		
5	Jānis Oja	Latvia		
6	Walter Strebi	Switzerland	DNS	

==== Quarterfinal 4 ====
Rank	Athlete	Nation	Time	Notes
1	Harold Abrahams	Great Britain	10.6	Q =OR
2	George Hester	Canada	10.7	Q
3	Ferenc Gerő	Hungary		
4	Albert Heisé	France		
5	Ernesto Bonacina	Italy		
6	Félix Mendizábal	Spain		

==== Quarterfinal 5 ====
Rank	Athlete	Nation	Time	Notes
1	Charles Paddock	United States	10.8	Q
2	Maurice Degrelle	France	11.0	Q
3	Johannes van Kampen	Netherlands		
4	George Dunston	South Africa		
5	Gusztáv Rózsahegyi	Hungary		

==== Quarterfinal 6 ====
Rank	Athlete	Nation	Time	Notes
1	Jackson Scholz	United States	10.8	Q
2	Slip Carr	Australia	10.9	Q
3	Lancelot Royle	Great Britain		
4	Paul Brochart	Belgium		
5	Oto Seviško	Latvia		

=== Semifinals ===
The semifinals were held on 7 July. The first three runners from each semifinal qualified for the final.

==== Semifinal 1 ====
Rank	Athlete	Nation	Time	Notes
1	Jackson Scholz	United States	10.8	Q
2	Arthur Porritt	New Zealand	11.1	Q
3	Loren Murchison	United States	11.2	Q
4	Wilfred Nichol	Great Britain	11.3	
5	Maurice Degrelle	France	11.4	
6	George Hester	Canada	11.5	

==== Semifinal 2 ====
Rank	Athlete	Nation	Time	Notes
1	Harold Abrahams	Great Britain	10.6	Q =OR
2	Charles Paddock	United States	10.7	Q
3	Chester Bowman	United States	10.7	Q
4	Slip Carr	Australia	10.7	
5	Cyril Coaffee	Canada	10.8	
6	Giovanni Frangipane	Italy	11.2	

=== Final ===
The final was held on 7 July.

Rank	Lane	Athlete	Nation	Time	Notes
1st place, gold medalist(s)	4	Harold Abrahams	Great Britain	10.6	=OR
2nd place, silver medalist(s)	3	Jackson Scholz	United States	10.7	
3rd place, bronze medalist(s)	6	Arthur Porritt	New Zealand	10.8	
4	5	Chester Bowman	United States	10.9	
5	1	Charles Paddock	United States	10.9	
6	2	Loren Murchison	United States	11.0	
