= 1924 Summer Student World Championships =

Multi-sport event in Warsaw, Poland

The 1924 Summer Student World Championships was the second edition of the global sports competition for student athletes. It was the first organised by the Confederation Internationale des Etudiants (CIE). Held from 17–20 September in Warsaw, Poland, seven nations competed in the men's only programme. The seven nations were England, Estonia, France, Italy, New Zealand, Poland and the United States. A total of five sports were contested: athletics, fencing, association football, rowing and tennis.

== Athletics medal summary ==
Event	Gold		Silver		Bronze	
100 metres	Arthur Porritt (NZL)	10.9	Zygmunt Weiss (POL)	11.1e	Pierre Parrain (FRA)	Not known
200 metres	Arthur Porritt (NZL)	22.2	Zygmunt Weiss (POL)	22.8e	Pierre Parrain (FRA)	Not known
400 metres	Zygmunt Weiss (POL)	51.8	Joseph Jackson (FRA)	53.2e	Friedrich Jaanvaldt (EST)	Not known
800 metres	Stefan Kostrzewski (POL)	2:00.4	Pierre Villeneuve (FRA)	+4m	Julius Tiisfeldt (EST)	+10m
1500 metres	Julius Tiisfeldt (EST)	4:16.0	Pierre Villeneuve (FRA)	Not known	Stefan Kostrzewski (POL)	Not known
3000 metres	Józef Jaworski (POL)	9:32.5	Stefan Kostrzewski (POL)	Not known	Julius Tiisfeldt (EST)	Not known
5000 metres	François Christophe (FRA)	17:31.0	Julius Tiisfeldt (EST)	Not known	Władysław Boski (POL)	Not known
110 m hurdles	Gabriel Sempé (FRA)	15.7	Arthur Porritt (NZL)	15.8e	Eugen Neumann (EST)	Not known
400 m hurdles	Stefan Kostrzewski (POL)	60.2	Robert Simon (FRA)	Not known	Only two finishers	
4 × 100 m relay	Poland; Zygmunt Weiss; Stefan Piątkowski; Stefan Kostrzewski; Zygmunt Dąbrowski	45.8	Estonia; Valter Ever; Eugen Uuemaa; Eduard Teinburg; Friedrich Jaanvaldt	46.4	France; Joseph Jackson; Pierre Parrain; Fournier; Raoul Luciani	Not known
4 × 400 m relay	Poland; Zygmunt Weiss; Edward Strumpf; Józef Jaworski; Stefan Kostrzewski	3:32.0	France; Joseph Jackson; Béteille; Pierre Villeneuve; Robert Simon	Not known	Estonia; Eduard Teinburg; Friedrich Jaanvaldt; Julius Tiisfeldt-Tiisväli; Rubli	Not known
1600 m medley relay	France; Joseph Jackson; Pierre Parrain; Pierre Villeneuve; Raoul Luciani	3:37.6	Poland; Zygmunt Weiss; Zygmunt Dąbrowski; Stefan Ołdak; Zdzisław Karczewski	3:38.8	Estonia; Valter Ever; Eugen Uuemaa; Friedrich Jaanvaldt; Julius Tiisfeldt-Tiisväli	Not known
3000 m team race	Poland; Józef Jaworski; Stefan Kostrzewski; Władysław Boski	8	France; Pierre Villeneuve; René Châtelain; François Christophe	13	Only two teams	
High jump	Valter Ever (EST)	1.78	Julian Gruner (POL)	1.70	Erazm Pawski (POL)	1.64
Pole vault	Valter Ever (EST)	3.40	Antoni Rzepka (POL)	3.20	Eugen Neumann (EST)	3.20
Long jump	Valter Ever (EST)	6.55	Eugen Neumann (EST)	6.05	Georges Krotoff (FRA)	5.97
Triple jump	Roger Rousset (FRA)	12.90	Valter Ever (EST)	12.82	Raoul Luciani (FRA)	12.68
Shot put	Gabriel Sempé (FRA)	11.595	Robert Simon (FRA)	11.535	Eugen Neumann (EST)	10.935
Discus throw	Sławosz Szydłowski (POL)	37.87	Gabriel Sempé (FRA)	34.60	René Paul (FRA)	31.19
Javelin throw	Sławosz Szydłowski (POL)	54.45	Julian Gruner (POL)	51.69	Ludwik Chełmicki (POL)	42.11
Javelin - Both Hands Aggregate	Sławosz Szydłowski (POL)	90.75	Not known	Not known	Not known	Not known
Pentathlon	Stefan Piątkowski (POL)	12	Valter Ever (EST)	12	Gabriel Sempé (FRA)	15

== Athletics medal table ==
Rank	Nation	Gold	Silver	Bronze	Total
1	Poland (POL)	9	7	4	20
2	France (FRA)	5	7	6	18
3	Estonia (EST)	4	4	8	16
4	New Zealand (NZL)	2	1	0	3
Totals (4 entries)		20	19	18	57

== Participating nations ==
- England
- Estonia
- Italy
- France
- New Zealand
- Poland
- United States

== See also ==
- FISU World University Games § Precursors
- University and college sport
