= Jackson Scholz =

American sprinter, Olympic medalist; sports fiction author (1897-1986)

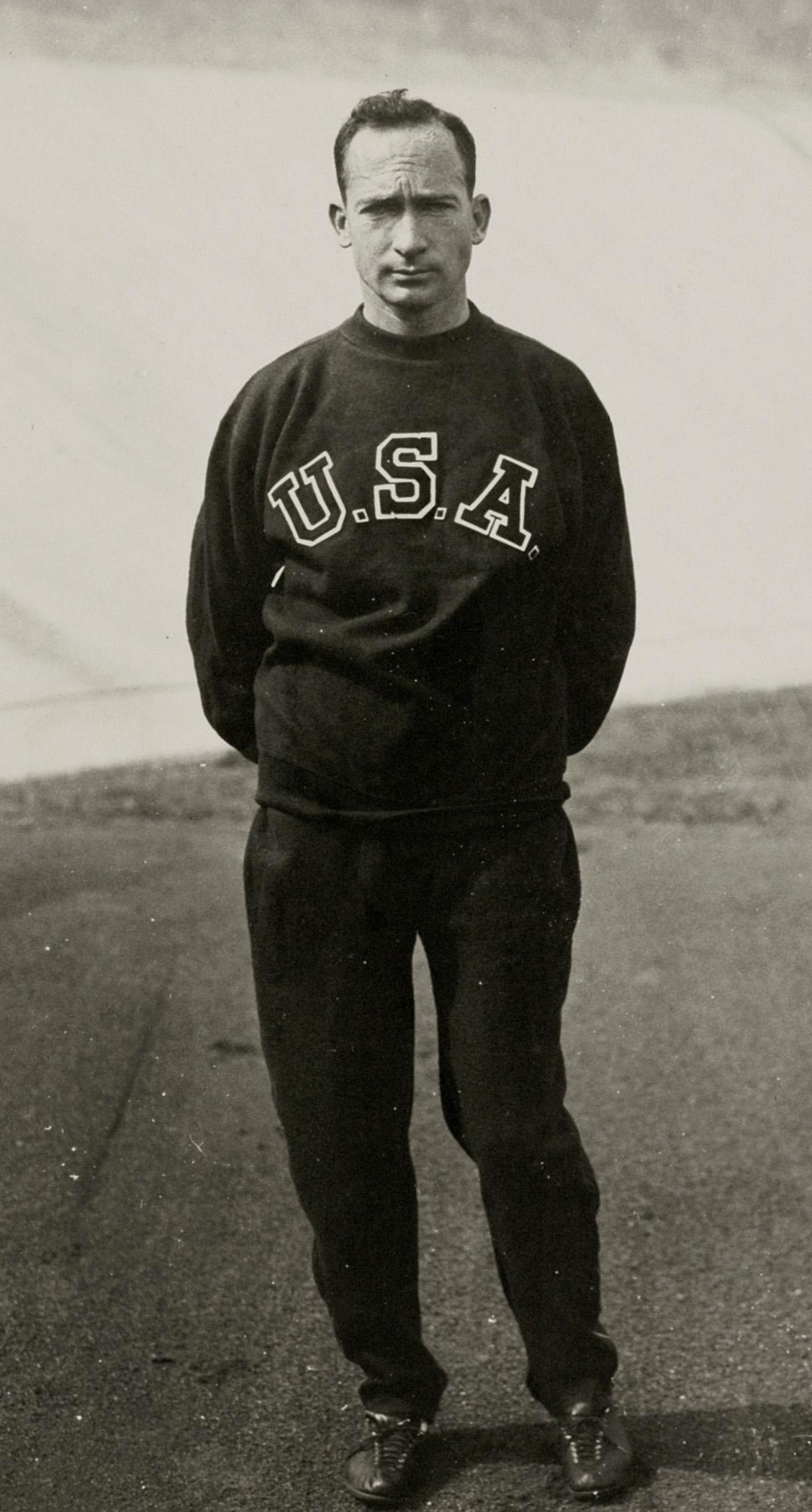
- Scholz at the 1928 Olympics

Personal information
- Full name: Jackson Volney Scholz
- Born: Jackson Volney English; March 15, 1897 Buchanan, Michigan, U.S.
- Died: October 26, 1986 (aged 89) Delray Beach, Florida, U.S.
- Education: University of Missouri (BA)
- Height: 5 ft 7 3/4 in (172 cm)
- Weight: 134 lb (61 kg)
- Spouse: Phyllis Jule Rahner (1903–86) (m. 1935–1986)

Sport
- Sport: Track & Field
- Events: 100 m, 200 m
- Club: NYAC, New York
Medal record
Men's athletics
Representing the United States
Olympic Games
Gold medal – first place	1920 Antwerp	4 × 100 m relay
Gold medal – first place	1924 Paris	200 metres
Silver medal – second place	1924 Paris	100 metres

Jackson Volney Scholz was an American sprinter and author. In the 1928 Olympics, he became the first person to appear in a sprint final in three different games. He financed his training for the 1924 Paris Olympics and beyond with his writing, which led to a half-century-long career as a popular pulp writer and novelist, primarily of juvenile sports fiction. Late in life, he was portrayed in the award-winning film about the 1924 games, Chariots of Fire (1981).

== Background ==
He was born Jackson Volney English, the only child of Frank English (1872–1931) and Anna Elizabeth Weaver English (1875–1952). The couple met and married (1894) in Buchanan, Michigan. After Jackson was born in 1897, the family moved to nearby Benton Harbor. Frank English was involved in a variety of construction enterprises, notably supervising the construction of water, gas, and electric plants. In 1903, the family moved to Colorado where English worked on projects in Fort Collins and Boulder. In February 1907, English ran his own brick-manufacturing plant in Boulder.

Seven months later, Anna sued Frank for divorce on grounds of cruelty, alleging wife-beating. In November, presumably with Jackson, she returned to Buchanan to spend the winter with her widowed mother. On May 25, 1908, she married Dr. Samuel Benjamin Scholz, Jr. (1878–1949), of Colorado Springs; the ceremony took place in Alameda County, California. Jackson was legally adopted by his stepfather. From that point forward, he was named Jackson V. Scholz, or more commonly Jack Scholz.

Dr. Scholz was a Spanish-American War veteran. In 1905, he graduated from the University of Denver with a Doctor of Medicine degree. When he married Anna, he was a traveling inspector for the Equitable Life Assurance Society. Acting as a medical representative for life insurance companies typified his career.

The family was in Los Angeles by 1911. Representing the Berendo Street Intermediate School, Jack entered the annual AAU South Pacific Association championships in the 100-yard dash (under 4 ft 9 in class), and the relay. Probably in reference to the same event, he recalled, "I won my first title back in 1911, the 85-pound championship of California. I ran the 100 that day in 12 4-5 in sneakers." In late 1912, the family lived in New York, where the Equitable Life headquarters were located. In January 1913, Dr. Scholz joined the Equitable offices in St. Louis to act as the “medical referee” for Missouri, Iowa, and Illinois.

Jack attended Soldan High School, St. Louis. He didn’t try out for the track team until his senior year, when he shocked the coach by beating Soldan’s star sprinter. On June 1, 1915, two weeks before graduation, the St. Louis interscholastic meet was held at Francis Field, the stadium built for the 1904 Summer Olympics. Scholz won the 100-yard dash in 10-1/5 seconds (i.e., 10.2), breaking the meet record by a fifth. He also competed in the high jump, broad jump, and relay.

Unrecruited, he entered the University of Missouri, Columbia, Missouri, fall 1915, in the College of Agriculture. Following his boyhood dream, he intended to become a farmer. He pledged to the Kappa Alpha Order fraternity. Under Coach Henry F. Schulte, Scholz developed into the fastest collegian in the nation, winning many races, indoors and out, while occasionally breaking records, up to the highest level.

Jackson’s half-sister, Elizabeth Jeannette Scholz (1916–33), Dr. Scholz’s and Anna’s only child together, was born in St. Louis on June 16, 1916.

== World War I ==
On June 5, 1918, Scholz registered for the draft. He asked and was accepted into the Navy’s flying division. He put his senior year at the university on hold. He reported to the Dunwoody Naval Training Station, Minneapolis, for basic training as a flyer on September 3. The November 11 Armistice made his service less timely. Nevertheless, by Thanksgiving he had transferred to the Miami Naval Air Station to continue training “for my own satisfaction”. In a letter to Schulte, he described the thrill of flying, even as a passenger: “While we were upside down 3,000 feet above the bay, I couldn’t help but hope that my safety belt would remain well fastened. Lots of fun.”

While serving, Scholz continued track training. In February 1919, at the Inter-Naval Aviation Meet, Key West, he won the 50-yard high hurdles and ran on the winning relay. On March 1, at Royal Palm Park, on the edge of the Everglades, the Miami Naval Air Station lost a dual meet with the Key West Air Station. However, Scholz won the 100 (10.1) and the broad jump (20 ft 11 in), but had to settle for a tie in the 220 at 24.2.

In March, Scholz transferred to Naval Air Station Pensacola to complete his training. In May, he was commissioned an ensign, discharged, and returned to Missouri.

As he recalled his experiences:

In World War I, I fought in the battle of Miami and Pensacola, and flew such balls of fire as the old N-9s, H-boats, F-boats, and something, which for want of a better name, the fellows called a Gyrene. It was a double pontooned biplane with a four-cylinder Hall-Scott motor which throve on castor oil, but didn’t seem to care for it after it reached an inky stage. Then it would spray the black stuff back across the pilot and his passenger, until they looked like a pair of end men. . . . Getting caught up there in the rain was just like having someone hurl gravel in your face.

In September 1919, he began his senior year at Missouri. He tried to join the football team, but Coach Shulte, also head football coach, forbade it. In track, Scholz was named an All-American.

== Olympics ==
=== 1920 Antwerp ===
The sprint events in the U.S. Olympic Trials took place on July 16–17, at Harvard Stadium. Scholz competed in the 100- and 220-yard dashes. (The Olympic events were 100 and 200 meters.)

In the 100, he won his heat in 10.2. The next day he won his semi in 10.0, then in the final ran an estimated 10.1 to finish second to Loren Murchison’s 10.0. In the 220, Scholz was second in his heat, time unknown. He didn’t finish in the top three in either semi, and didn’t make the final, limited to six runners.

Trial placing was not binding on the Olympic team selectors until 1928. For the 1920 games, Scholz was selected for the 100 and the 4x100 relay. “When I was actually assured of being a member of the sixth American Olympic team,” he wrote, “I was hardly able to grasp the wonder of it.”

The team crossed the Atlantic on the USS Princess Matoika, a ship that had just come in loaded with the remains of fallen soldiers. There were no staterooms, only bunks in the hold. “The air was close and the odor terrible,” wrote Scholz. Nearing Antwerp, the athletes drafted a resolution condemning the generally deplorable conditions. Scholz was one of many signatories in an event which became known as the Mutiny of the Matoika. “The psychological effect on the team was stunning,” Scholz added. “When they landed on the other side of the Atlantic they were in no shape to talk, let alone run.”

Nevertheless, on August 15, he won his 100 heat and quarterfinal, both in 10.8 seconds. The next morning, he ran 10.9 in his semifinal, finishing second to Harry Edward (Great Britain). “It was a cold day,” recalled Charley Paddock (USA). “The track was wet and our own track suits were more or less soaked.” Just before taking the track for the final, head track coach Lawson Robertson took the four American qualifiers to “a little café above the stadium” and treated each to a “sherry and raw egg” to boost their spirits. “We all thought we were going to be drunk.” In the race, the inexperienced officials—in Scholz’s view—made a mess of the start and blanket finish. Paddock, 10.8, and Morris Kirksey (USA), 10.9, were certain for gold and silver. Scholz was given fifth at 10.9. “When the photographs came out, showing me with an indisputable third, the officials reluctantly compromised and gave me a fourth.” Edward, 10.9, was awarded the bronze. Commenting on the difference between the trials distance of 100 yards and the international standard of 100 meters—about ten yards longer—Scholz explained: “I ran a swell one hundred yards, but finished fourth. . . . It was a good lesson.”

On August 21, the final day, the American team of Paddock, Scholz, Murchison, and Kirksey, running in that order, won the first of three semis in 43.0. The following day, the identical lineup contested the final. According to Paddock, they “trotted out on the field, late as usual.” In 1927, Scholz recalled, “When Paddock passed the baton to me, I snatched it from his hand so fast that he thought we had lost it. He says that he still has heart failure when he thinks of it.” They won in a world record 42.2, the announcement of which provoked a “great cheer” from the audience since it took Germany’s last Olympic record off the books.

=== 1924 Paris ===
In 1921, Scholz retired from active competition and was in and out of the sport as he began his writing career, his fitness suffering accordingly. In fall 1923, he began training seriously, writing in the day and running in the evening. His participation in the 1924 Olympic Trials (Harvard Stadium, June 13–14) was considered a comeback and, since he was well past prime for a sprinter at 27, a longshot. Yet, he emerged the biggest name of the star-studded U.S. track and field team headed for Paris.

In the 100 meter heats, Scholz and Paddock advanced with the fastest times of 10.6, which matched the standing Olympic record. Later that day, Scholz won his semi in another 10.6, the best time of the round. The next day, 35,000 spectators endured a drizzling rain to watch the action. In the 100 final, the top three finishers were clocked at 10.6. In an upset, Chester Bowman won, while Scholz and Paddock tied for second.

Scholz owned the 200, however. On June 13, his 21.0 in the fourth heat bested the world record. He topped himself the following day by winning his semi in 20.9. He then won the final in 21.0, beating second-place finisher Bayes Norton by a dominant two-tenths.

Scholz was considered a favorite to win the 200 in Paris, and a contender for the 100. He was also named to the 4x100 relay team. His highest praise came from rival Paddock, writing for his hometown Pasadena Star-News: “Few men have ever possessed as much sheer speed, as fast a start, or been more consistent through the years, than the little Missourian,” adding to the list his “marvelous pick-up at about seventy or eighty yards”.

At the Olympics (July 5–27), Scholz competed in the 100 and 200. Ultimately, the selectors left the top Americans, including Bowman, Scholz, and Paddock, off the relay team. (The second-tier U.S. team broke the world record twice and tied their fresh record in winning the final.)

On July 6, Scholz won both his 100 heat and quarterfinal in 10.8. Harold Abrahams (Great Britain) tied the Olympic record of 10.6 in his quarterfinal. The next day, the semis were “run in the rain, on a soft, heavy track.” Scholz won the first semi in 10.8; in the second, Abrahams tied the OR again. The four American finalists (of six slots) had three hours to kill in the athlete’s tent before the final. They decided “that unless a miracle occurred [they] would be beaten” by Abrahams. Not only was he too fast, his long stride was deemed an additional benefit on the “slushy track.” They debated a scheme to game the rules. Since the Olympics allowed two false starts before ejection, the Americans had a pool of eight false starts to play with. The scheme was to take turns false starting. If one got away with it, the two-yard advantage would win them the race; if all eight false starts were called back, Abrahams would be worn down by the half-hour of all-out starts it took to play out. In the end, sportsmanship won out and they “took [their] licking, no one jumping the gun.” True to form, Abrahams won, tying the OR yet again. Scholz took second in 10.7. A demoralized Paddock came in fifth.

On July 8, Scholz won his 200 heat in 22.4, and his quarterfinal in 21.8. Paddock was the second slowest quarterfinal qualifier at 22.2. That evening, he dined with film actors Douglas Fairbanks, Mary Pickford, and Maurice Chevalier at the luxury Hôtel de Crillon, confessing his lack of confidence. In a private pep talk, Pickford urged him: “Believe in yourself and you will win tomorrow.”

The next day, Scholz won the first semi, beating teammate George Hill. In the second semi, Paddock, feeling “the confidence which had not been mine for several years,” bested Eric Liddell (Great Britain). All four were clocked in 21.8, setting up a suspenseful final a few hours later. Paddock, considering Scholz his “hardest opponent,” described the race:

I found myself ahead of Scholz as we came off the turn. For the fraction of a second, I lost my newfound confidence, and though it came back to me in the closing yards of the race, it was too late. I lost by a few inches.

Scholz’s winning time tied the Olympic record of 21.6. The surface was considered mushier than American tracks, which would explain his significantly slower times compared to the trials. “The cinders on the track seemed nearly up to my ankles,” he recalled. The other medals went to Paddock, 21.7, and Liddell, 21.9. The other finalists were Hill, 22.0, Bayes Norton, 22.0, and Abrahams, 22.3. The USA placed 1, 2, 4, and 5, while Great Britain took 3 and 6. Paddock called Scholz’s win, given his lengthy absence from the sport, “one of the greatest surprises ever registered in the history of sprint running.”

Scholz consistently criticized Paddock’s “bad habit” of leaping across the finish line, costing himself time and possibly placings. Paddock felt it gained him a foot or two. The technique is clearly visible in a widely-reprinted photo of the 200 finish, which provoked long-lasting speculation that Paddock’s leap may have cost him the gold. Paddock rebutted this view: "Ten yards from the finish...I went dead. I had nothing left but momentum and turned my head and body only with the idea of reaching for the tape, gaining an extra inch or two that might mean the difference between defeat and victory. But Jack had the most stuff and won."

In 1982, Scholz recalled the games:

I really had never heard of Harold Abrahams or Eric Liddell before the Olympics. They didn’t have an international reputation, but they won two big races [100, 400] against our strongest runners. . . . [In the 100,] Abrahams was running on an inside track that had been smoothed over because it was used for the decathlon event earlier. . . . But he deserved to win—he got a great start and made the most of it.

In the aftermath of the games, Scholz led the unofficial “World’s Fastest Human” competition, an inevitable debate that usually follows the Olympics. Scholz’s 200 dominance (trials and games), plus his 100 silver, made the argument. Abrahams had been stellar in the Olympic 100 but fell to a distant sixth and last in the 200; he medaled in the relay but finished second to the American team. Scholz supplanted Paddock, who the title had originated with in 1921. After the race, Paddock said, “Congratulations, Jack. You just cost me $25,000,” alluding to the “fat lecturing contracts” that awaited him contingent on his retaining the title.

=== 1928 Amsterdam ===
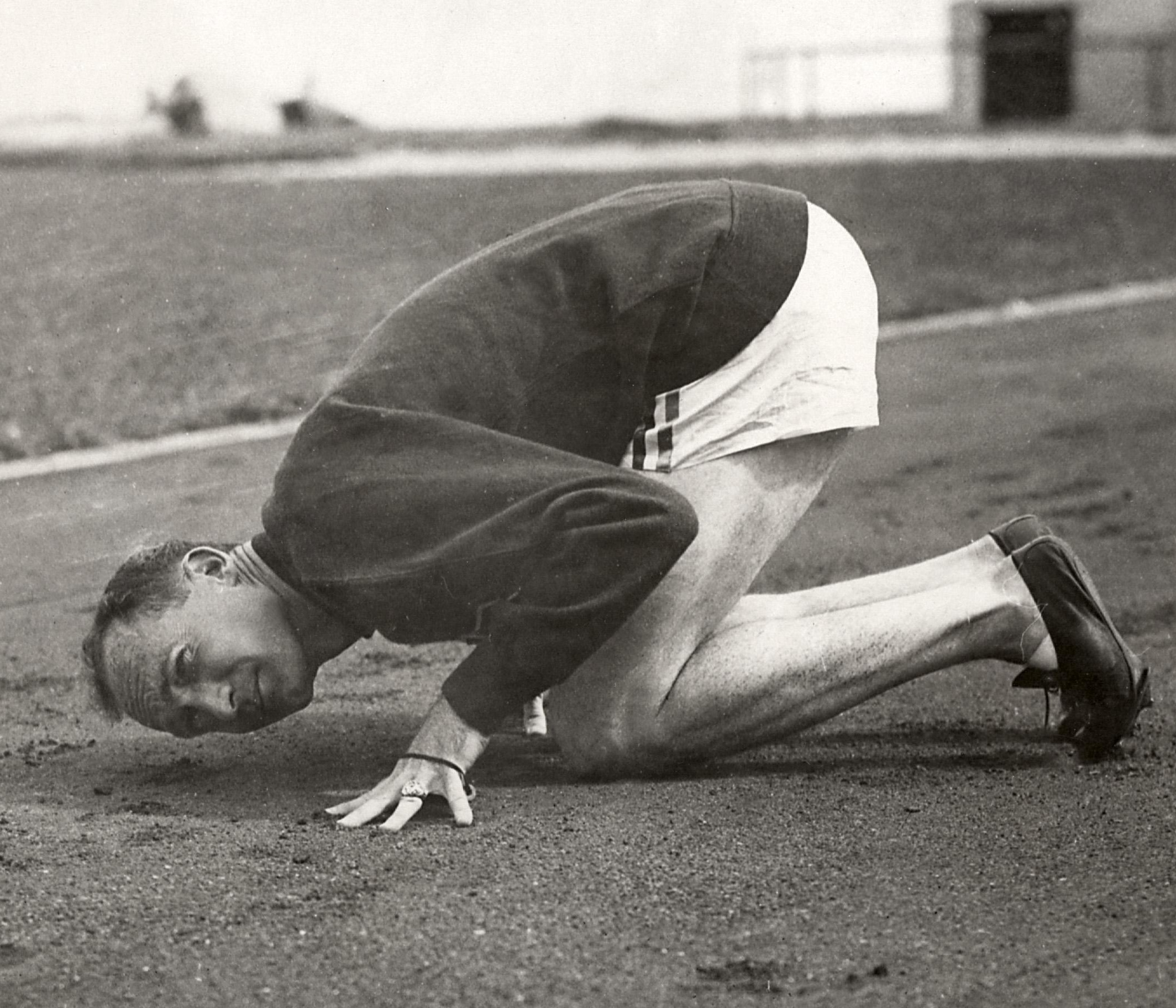
Scholz inspecting the track before his 200 m Olympic race in 1928

The year was another comeback for Scholz whose writing career was well underway as he aimed to make his third Olympic team. The men’s Olympic Trials were again held at Harvard Stadium, July 6–7. Four rounds of the 100 were completed on the 6th, while three rounds of the 200 were run the next day.

Scholz won the fifth heat of the 100 in a relatively slow 11 seconds. He slipped to second in the second quarterfinal, then took another second in the first semi. In the final, he fell to fifth meaning he didn’t qualify for Amsterdam in the event and wasn’t selected for the relay.

In the 200, he won the fifth heat in 21.6. He finished second in the first semi, and third in the final in an estimated 21.5. Thus, his only event in the Olympics was the 200.

On July 31, he won both his heat, 22.2, and quarterfinal, 21.8. The next day, Scholz ran the second fastest time in the semis, 21.9, finishing behind Helmut Körnig’s (Germany) 21.8. (Körnig had tied the 21.6 OR in the quarterfinals.) Both were upset in the final by Percy Williams (Canada), 21.8, and Walter Rangeley (Great Britain), 21.9. Körnig and Scholz both timed 21.9, as well. After a lengthy deliberation by the judges, a dead heat was declared for third. A runoff was scheduled for the morning of August 3, but Scholz proved hard to locate. On the 3rd, he gave his side:

I first heard of the possibility of the runoff last night. I went to see Gen. Douglas MacArthur, president of the American committee, who assured me there would be none. I had broken training anyway but I might have competed. Today I was given five minutes’ notice to run, an official accosting me when I had a big Dutch cigar in my mouth.

“Broken training” was a euphemism. As Scholz recounted in 1982, after the meeting with MacArthur, “I tied one on that night and was in no shape to run”. Thus, Scholz declined to race. However, Körnig was at the track ready to go and was awarded the bronze. The outcome must have grated on Scholz. When recounting his achievements, he always called his result a tie for third rather than a fourth.

Film of the 200 final has confirmed that Körnig edged out Scholz.

=== 1932 attempted comeback ===
In January 1932, with the Los Angeles Summer Olympics looming, it was widely reported that Scholz would attempt another comeback. By some measures, the timing was ideal. He’d be racing on home turf, the same city where his sprint career had begun; and American fans were desperate for a savior after being shut out of the 100/200 medals in Amsterdam. But time didn’t cooperate with Scholz, as he recounted later in the year:

Early in the season, I experienced a substantial touch of Olympic fever, dug my track shoes from the bottom of a trunk, and conceived the fine idea of trying for my fourth Olympic team. I worked daily with [American team head coach] Lawson Robertson’s squad at Franklin Field [University of Pennsylvania, Philadelphia], and surprised myself by finding that there was still something left in the old legs. But that, apparently, was as far as it went. The flesh was willing enough, but the spirit rebelled, and I found, for the first time in my life, that training was an effort. . . . I forgot about it.

He may have gotten a boost in March from a widely-reprinted article by Charley Paddock in which he magnanimously labeled his rival, in a detailed argument, the “greatest sprinter of all time”.

Scholz later wrote, “The old ambition seemed hard to muster again. The firing pistol had lost a little of its thrill.”[40] His track career subsequently ended.

== Writing career ==
By 1932, Scholz’s writing career was well underway, overlapping his running career by a decade.

The first hint of his desire to write came when he returned to the university after World War I. An avid reader, he switched his degree program to the School of Journalism. He had to double up his courses to graduate on time.

After the 1920 Olympics, he found that his relay gold didn’t “translate to money.” Charles W. Burton, a wealthy Detroit real-estate developer and sports enthusiast, found him an easy job in real estate. He ran for the Detroit Athletic Club, but got bored with real estate after two years. He went to New York and got hired as a “bin monkey” in a hosiery factory, sorting socks into bins. He soon landed a better job with the United Press (UP) as an assistant sports editor. He lasted for a year and a half. His bylined pieces date from July 1922 to June 1923. His first piece, a prognosis for Charley Paddock, was preceded by an editor’s note that touted Scholz’s athletic achievements—he was an entry-level celebrity journalist. About half of his articles were about track and field; he also covered college football and professional boxing. But there were less than twenty short articles in a year. He explained his departure: “editing wires—making 2,500 words into twenty-five lines—lost its thrill after a time.” Later, he admitted that he was a “flop,” that he got the “air,” i.e., he’d been fired.

While still at UP, and using a rented typewriter, he wrote his first piece of fiction, a short story. “And Jill Came Tumbling After” sold to Argosy All-Story Weekly, a leading pulp-fiction magazine, appearing in the July 14, 1923, issue. It was a short romcom with some clever writing that drew upon Scholz’s Navy background. The setting was Miami, Key West, and environs. The story involved a flying boat (seaplane) pilot and his challenging girlfriend Jill.

He next tried a new pulp (first issue, September 8, 1923), Sport Story Magazine, which offered a wide variety of sports fiction aimed at boys, the first magazine of its kind. He sent them numerous stories; all were rejected. He apparently didn’t realize that most of the content, at first, were low-cost reprints that came from publisher Street & Smith’s (S&S) inventory. But then fabled U.S. middle-distance runner Mel Sheppard, star of the 1908 Summer Olympics, made a deal with Sport Story to sell them his life story. He asked Scholz to ghostwrite it. Spiked Shoes and Cinder Paths was serialized in eleven twice-a-month issues from May 8 through October 8, 1924. S&S paid $3,500 for the work, of which Scholz received half, financing his training for the Paris Olympics. When Sheppard told the company that Scholz was the author, they “begged” Scholz for more. He resubmitted one of his rejects and they published it. His destiny as a writer was set.

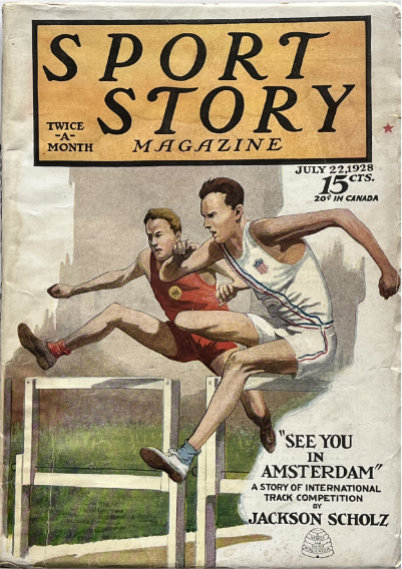
Sport Story Magazine, July 22, 1928

He’d also found a home—Street & Smith and, particularly, Sport Story—though, because of his travels, he wouldn’t really move into his new quarters until 1926, when he published 11 short stories in the magazine. From 1927–31, Scholz averaged 16+ sales a year to the company, while selling a few stories to other publishers. Then the numbers started climbing. From 1932–38, retired from running, he averaged 38 sales per year with 1936 the peak at 53. From 1931–38, 100% of his sales went to S&S, the vast majority to Sport Story. In 1939, he branched out to other publishers again and his S&S sales dropped to 23. From 1940–43, he only averaged 8 sales a year to S&S. He had a track tale in the last issue of Sport Story (July 1943), his 407th appearance in the magazine. He made only one more sale to S&S, in 1943.

During his most productive years, he often had two, even three, stories in a single issue of Sport Story. A second story would be published under the name “Royal Hall,” and a third under “Jack Volney” (his nickname plus middle name).

In February 1927, William Morrow published Scholz’s first book, Split Seconds: Tales of the Cinder Track, collecting his first ten Sport Story tales, all track & field yarns. Told from the point of view of a track coach at a midwestern university, they were inspired by Coach Schulte.

In 1927, Sport Story serialized Scholz’s autobiography, The Cinder Trail, in five installments (July 22–September 22). A detailed account of his athletic career, it was never republished elsewhere, and obviously doesn’t cover Amsterdam 1928.

For most freelance pulp writers, it paid to diversify, to withstand changes in publisher, editor, reader tastes, and so forth. Thus, after Charles Lindbergh became a sensation in 1927, and aviation fiction became a hot new genre, Scholz tried his hand using his Navy flying experience for background material. He published 10 air stories from 1929–30. Four were for Street & Smith’s Air Trails; the rest went to other pulps like Airplane Stories and Sky Birds. After the U.S. entered World War II, he returned to the genre, publishing about 21 additional air stories through 1947.

Though he wrote a great many track and field stories, he became known as a sports polymath. He wrote stories about the major team sports, individual sports like tennis, and lesser-known sports like boat racing, cross country, or water polo. He wrote a number of stories about golf, his favorite sport after he retired from running. Ronald Oliphant, Sport Story editor in the 1930s, wrote:

In his stories, he draws on scenes of athletic competition in which he has taken part, as well as those of which he has been a spectator. Scholz is a keen sport fan. I think he can write of more kinds of sport than any other man now contributing to Sport Story. His knowledge is not confined to sprinting. He attends every kind of sport event.

With the meteoric rise of comic books, starting in 1938, the pulps lost a large part of their juvenile audience, which helps explain Scholz’s change in fortunes at the end of the 1930s. Oliphant retired and the magazine switched to a monthly, halving the opportunities for authors. Scholz’s sales to S&S, and the pulps in general, declined. His pulp sales dwindled into the 1950s, as the market steadily contracted.

Another factor is that the second part of his writing career had begun. In 1939, he returned to Morrow, publisher of Split Seconds, with Fighting Coach: A Football Story, an original novel. It was published in February 1940. From 1940–71 (excepting 1941 and ’43), he published a new juvenile sports novel every year. Gone was the variety of Sport Story, though. Fifteen of the novels were about football, 14 were about baseball, and one was about golf.

On August 17, 1935, Scholz married Phyllis Jule Rahner, a New York department store buyer. They had no children. In 1938, they bought a 57-acre farm near Doylestown, Pennsylvania, though apparently Scholz never did any actual farming. In 1972, Scholz retired from writing and the couple moved to Delray Beach, Florida, where they spent the rest of their lives.

== Chariots of Fire ==
Scholz got another crack at fame with the release of Chariots of Fire (1981) which won Best Picture, and three other Oscars, at the 54th Academy Awards.

The film tells the story of the 1924 Paris Olympics primarily from the perspective of British sprinters Harold Abrahams and Eric Liddell. To represent the American team, the film focuses on Scholz (played by Brad Davis) and Charley Paddock. The film took ample dramatic license with the historical record, including its depiction of Scholz. He reviewed the screenplay before the film was shot.

Differences between Scholz’s experience and the film:

- In the film, the British runners are briefed on the competition. A slide is shown of Scholz in the 1920 100-meter final. The British are told that he cost himself a medal by looking to the right as he crossed the line. “That’s really ridiculous,” Scholz said. “I used to dip my body forward, turning to the right as I approached the tape. That gave me an angle approach to the finish, which is what you need to edge out the others.”
- The British are told that Scholz’s nickname is the “New York Thunderbolt”, alluding to his sponsorship by the New York Athletic Club. “That was the first time I heard that name used for me,” said Scholz. In fact, Scholz had many nicknames through his years of competition, but no single one stuck, and “New York Thunderbolt” was not on the list. Coach Schulte had named him “Germany” because of his last name, but once the U.S. entered World War I, that was dropped.
- In the film, Scholz and other American athletes are introduced to the Prince of Wales. Scholz denied ever meeting him.
- In the film, Scholz engages in rigorous calisthenics. Scholz rebutted: “I am portrayed as a very active person. Hell, I was really one of the laziest men on the team.”
- In the film, on the evening following the 100 final, Abrahams goes out drinking with his coach, Sam Mussabini. According to bronze medalist Arthur Porritt (New Zealand) (“Tom Watson” in the film), that evening the finalists dined together.
- In the film, Abrahams redeems his last place in the 200 final by winning the 100. In reality, the 100 came first on the schedule. Scholz, then, would receive any claim to redemption.
- In the film, Scholz hands Liddell a good-luck note before the 400 final. According to Scholz: “That would have been very dramatic, but I don’t remember ever speaking to Liddell, much less writing him a note.” Furthermore, it challenges credibility that Scholz would buck up an Englishman when there were two Americans in the final. However, Scholz agreed to let screenwriter Colin Welland keep the scene as written.

By the time the film came out, Scholz was the only major character still alive. Paddock died in 1943; Liddell, 1945; and Abrahams, 1978. After the Academy Awards (March 29, 1982), Scholz became a focus of media attention. Within a few weeks, he was interviewed 21 times. Having just turned 85 and troubled by high blood pressure, he stopped talking to the press.

He felt no urgency to see the film. From what he’d heard, “I would probably be annoyed by the portrayal of the track meet and my character.” Instead, as an interviewer conveyed it, he could “just close his eyes and recall the 1924 games in Paris with vivid clarity.” Said Scholz, “One day, I’ll go see the movie but for now I’d rather have my own memories of how things were.” According to his brother-in-law, Harry Rahner, he never saw it.

Scholz’s renewed celebrity extended two years, into the 1984 Summer Olympics. In an American Express credit card commercial, he sits in a restaurant with Ben Cross, the actor who played Abrahams. Cross says to the camera, “I beat him in the movie Chariots of Fire.” Scholz replies with mock indignation, "You didn't beat me!" Then, proving he was “still pretty fast,” it turns out that Scholz has beaten Cross to the draw in picking up the tab with his credit card.

== Scholz vs. Paddock ==
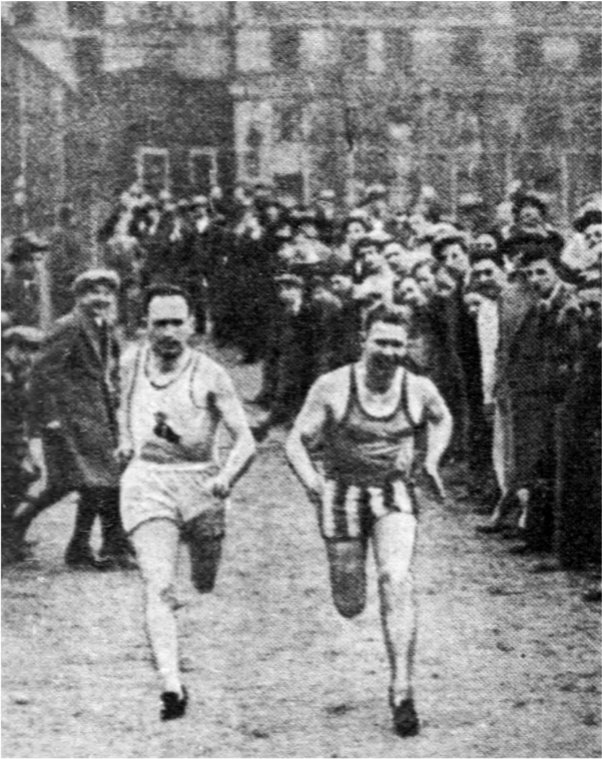
Scholz and Paddock training at Columbia University for the Olympics, on March 28, 1928 (New York Daily News)

Charley Paddock died in 1943, depriving the record of his view of Chariots of Fire. In the film, Scholz and Paddock represent the American juggernaut that the British sprinters must overcome. In the broader view, Scholz and Paddock were the two most accomplished sprinters of the era.

The unexpected detail is that both were already making money as professional writers by the time of the 1924 games; both became accomplished career writers. They wrote about each other on occasion when their sprinting careers were active, and retrospectively after their sprint heroics had ended. Scholz specialized in fiction whereas Paddock wrote sports journalism and eventually managed a string of newspapers.

They had numerous other similarities. They were roughly the same height (5 ft 7 in) though Paddock outweighed Scholz by about 30 lbs. Both were barred by their college coaches from playing football (Paddock). Both took to golf after their sprinting days were through.

Their Olympic careers were a close match. Each ran in the same three Olympics: 1920/24/28. They were the first sprinters to compete in three Olympics. They shared the gold medal in the 1920 4x100 relay. In 1920, Paddock took gold in the 100 and silver in the 200. In 1924, Scholz flipped it, taking gold in the 200 and silver in the 100. Paddock had an additional medal, the 200 silver in 1924. However, Scholz insisted he deserved the 100 bronze in 1920, and Paddock, who was in the race, agreed that he was “robbed.” Additionally, both athletes scaled back their running between games to work on their writing careers.

Both published their serialized memoirs in Sport Story Magazine, Scholz in 1927 and Paddock in 1928. Though Paddock only appeared in the magazine 15 times, he and Scholz had material in the same issue 7 times.

Both had comeback attempts aimed at making a 4th Olympic team in 1932. In 1929, after the disappointment of Amsterdam, Paddock attempted a first comeback but then announced his retirement for good in July. By January 1930, he was already plotting his return. But, like Scholz’s comeback, it fizzled out in 1932.

In 1982, according to an interviewer, “Of his track accomplishments, Scholz recalls little but the duels he staged with the great Paddock.” Regarding their head-to-head matchups, Scholz frequently brought up a similar stat: “I met him 17 times, and I beat him 12.” The stat mutated as his memories aged, including the omission of their lone tie. The following table shows their known matchups, a 10-5-1 record in Scholz’s favor.

The large time gaps are attributable to several factors: Scholz and Paddock alternated between retirements and comebacks as their writing careers demanded; Olympic years were the main priority; they lived on opposite coasts; and they took lengthy overseas trips, but not with each other. In January 1929, Scholz cited his record against Paddock as 12-4; the table shows 10-4-1 by that time; the additional two wins aren’t accounted for.
Scholz vs. Paddock: Head-to-Head Matchups
Date	Event	City	Race	Winner	Place	Loser	Place
02/07/1920	B.A.A. Games	Boston	40y (semi)	Scholz	1st	Paddock	–
02/10/1920	Millrose Games	New York	70y	Scholz	1st	Paddock	3rd
07/10/1920	American Legion Games	New York	100m	Paddock	1st	Scholz	2nd
07/17/1920	Olympic Trials	Cambridge, MA	100y (semi)	Scholz	1st	Paddock	2nd
07/17/1920	Olympic Trials	Cambridge	100y (final)	Scholz	2nd	Paddock	3rd
08/16/1920	Olympics	Antwerp, Belgium	100m (final)	Paddock	1st	Scholz	4th
08/30/1920	Triangular Meet	Colombes, France	100m	Paddock	1st	Scholz	2nd
06/14/1924	Olympic Trials	Cambridge	100m (final)	Scholz/Paddock, 2nd (tie)			
07/07/1924	Olympics	Paris	100m (final)	Scholz	2nd	Paddock	5th
07/09/1924	Olympics	Paris	200m (final)	Scholz	1st	Paddock	2nd
07/05/1927	AAU Nationals	Lincoln, Nebraska	440y relay (heat)	Scholz (NYAC)	1st	Paddock (LAAC)	2nd
07/05/1927	AAU Nationals	Lincoln	440y relay (final)	Scholz (NYAC)	2nd	Paddock (LAAC)	4th
07/05/1927	AAU Nationals	Lincoln	880y relay (final)	Scholz (NYAC)	1st	Paddock (LAAC)	3rd
07/07/1928	Olympic Trials	Cambridge	200m (final)	Paddock	2nd	Scholz	3rd
08/12/1928	post-Olympic invitational	Paris	100m	Scholz	1st	Paddock	4th
07/05/1929	AAU Nationals	Denver	880y relay (final)	Paddock (LAAC)	1st	Scholz (NYAC)	2nd

Finally, their attitudes toward each other seldom provoked comment. In 1929, Paddock referred to Scholz and himself as “friendly rivals.” In 1982, Scholz recalled, “There was no love lost between Charlie and me. We weren’t the best of friends, but we respected each other as competitors.”

== Death and legacy ==
Scholz was regarded as one of the leading sprinters of his era. As track and field was largely an amateur sport, he also earned a living by writing popular fiction.

In 1977, Scholz was inducted into the National Track and Field Hall of Fame, in the same class as his 1928 Olympic teammate Frank Wykoff. Charley Paddock had been inducted the year before. In 1990, Scholz was inducted into the University of Missouri Hall of Fame.

According to Scholz’s brother-in-law, “Jack said it just came naturally to him. He didn’t have to try, he was just born a fast runner.”

Phyllis Scholz died in Delray Beach on January 2, 1986. Jackson followed on October 26. Their ashes were scattered at sea.

When asked about his legacy, Scholz replied: “I’d like for people to remember me as a winner, a successful runner, a decent writer and a gentleman. And one other thing . . . I was fast. I hope they remember I was fast.”

== Books ==
Following his initial collection, Scholz wrote 30 juvenile sports novels, all published by William Morrow.

- Split Seconds: Tales of the Cinder Track (1927); collects Scholz’s first 10 stories from Sport Story Magazine; introduction by Grantland Rice
- Fighting Coach: A Football Story (1940)
- Soldiers at Bat (1942)
- Pigskin Warriors (1944)
- Goal to Go (1945)
- Batter Up (1946)
- Gridiron Challenge (1947)
- Fielder from Nowhere (1948)
- Johnny King, Quarterback (1949)
- Keystone Kelly (1950)
- Fullback for Sale (1951)
- Deep Short (1952)
- One-Man Team (1953)
- End Zone (1954)
- Base Burglar (1955)
- Fighting Chance, A (1956)
- Man in a Cage (1957)
- Bench Boss (1958)
- Perfect Game, The (1959)
- Football Rebels, The (1960)
- Center-Field Jinx (1961)
- Halfback on His Own (1962)
- Dugout Tycoon (1963)
- Fairway Challenge (1964) [golf]
- Rookie Quarterback (1965)
- Spark Plug at Short (1966)
- Backfield Buckaroo (1967)
- Big Mitt, The (1968)
- Fullback Fever (1969)
- Hot-Corner Hank (1970)
- Backfield Blues (1971)

== Selected magazine writing ==
=== Fiction ===
- “And Jill Came Tumbling After”, Argosy All-Story Weekly, July 14, 1923 [first known published fiction]
- “Pigskins and Pig-Heads”, Sport Story Magazine, October 22, 1926 [first football story]
- “A Matter of Temperament”, Sport Story Magazine, October 22, 1924 [first story in Sport Story]
- “The ‘M’ Table”, Sport Story, 2 April 1930 [Missouri]
- “Pigskin Pressure”, Thrilling Sports, January 1939 [first story in a Thrilling pulp]
- “Front-Page Tailback”, All-American Football Magazine, October 1942; and “Backfield Bomb”, Football Stories, October 1942 [first stories in Fiction House pulps]
- “One More Mile”, Sport Story Magazine, July 1943 [last issue of Sport Story]
- Royal Hall, “Somewhere in the Pacific”, Doc Savage, November 1943 [last appearance in a S&S pulp]
- “Keystone Feud”, Boys’ Life, July 1949 [first in a series of 20 appearances in the Boy Scouts magazine]
- “Gridiron Milkman” (2-part serial), Boys’ Life, November, December 1958 [last known magazine fiction]

=== Nonfiction ===
- United Press, “Will Paddock Yield to Eastern Call?”, July 22, 1922 [first found bylined piece as United Press Staff Correspondent]
- United Press, “Miss Brown Is Indignant at Statements”, June 9, 1923 [last found bylined piece as United Press Staff Correspondent]
- Spiked Shoes and Cinder Paths, by Mel Sheppard (11-part serial), Sport Story Magazine, May 8–Oct 8, 1924 [ghostwritten by Scholz]
- United Press, “Finnish Runner Breaks Two World’s Records”, January 9, 1925 [Scholz add-on to UP report on Paavo Nurmi]
- The Cinder Trail, Sport Story Magazine, 5-part serial, July 22–September 22, 1927 [autobiography]
- “Missouri—My School”, College Stories, July 1931
- “California or Bust!”, Sport Story Magazine, August 25, 1932 [analysis of competing at the Olympic level, with some personal reminiscences]
