= Junqueras =

Junqueras (Eastern Catalan: [ʒuŋˈkeɾəs]) is a Catalan surname. Notable people with the surname include:

- Juan Junqueras (1900–1938), Spanish sprinter
- Oriol Junqueras (born 1969), Spanish politician
