= Álvaro Ribeiro =

Brazilian sprinter

Personal information
- Nationality: Brazilian
- Born: 16 May 1901
- Died: 11 November 1979 (aged 78)

Sport
- Sport: Track and field
- Events: 100m, 200m

Álvaro Ribeiro (16 May 1901 – 11 November 1979) was a Brazilian sprinter. He competed in the men's 100 metres and the 200 metres events at the 1924 Summer Olympics.
