= Pantelidis =

Pantelidis is a surname. Notable people with the surname include:

- Andreas Pantelidis (born 1962), Greek alpine skier
- Konstantinos Pantelidis (1901–?), Greek sprinter and long jumper
- Kostas Pantelidis (born 1985), Greek darts player
- Pantelis Pantelidis (1983–2016), Greek singer, songwriter and lyricist
- Pavlos Pantelidis (born 2002), Greek footballer
- Savvas Pantelidis (born 1965), Greek footballer
- Steve Pantelidis (born 1983), Australian footballer
