= John McKechenneay =

Canadian sprinter

Personal information
- Born: 25 September 1903 Montreal, Quebec, Canada
- Died: 21 October 1979 (aged 76) Montreal, Quebec, Canada

Sport
- Sport: Sprinting
- Event: 200 metres

John Myrth McKechenneay (25 September 1903 – 21 October 1979) was a Canadian sprinter. He competed in the men's 200 metres at the 1924 Summer Olympics.
