= Alois Linka =

Czech sprinter

Personal information
- Nationality: Czech
- Born: 24 April 1899 Jičín, Austria-Hungary
- Died: 18 January 1968 (aged 68) Prague, Czechoslovakia

Sport
- Country: Czechoslovakia
- Sport: Track and field
- Events: 100m, 200m

Alois Linka (24 April 1899 – 18 January 1968) was a Czech sprinter. He competed for Czechoslovakia in the men's 100 metres and the 200 metres events at the 1924 Summer Olympics.
