= Ferdinand Kaindl =

Austrian sprinter

Personal information
- Nationality: Austrian
- Born: 1901

Sport
- Sport: Track and field
- Event: 100m

Ferdinand Kaindl (born 1901, date of death unknown) was an Austrian sprinter. He competed in the men's 100 metres event at the 1924 Summer Olympics.
