= Frederik Lamp =

Dutch sprinter (1905–1945)

Personal information
- Nationality: Dutch
- Born: 6 September 1905 Haarlem, Netherlands
- Died: 27 May 1945 (aged 39) Pekanbaru, Dutch East Indies

Sport
- Sport: Track and field
- Event: 100m

Frederik Lamp (6 September 1905 – 27 May 1945) was a Dutch sprinter. He competed in the men's 100 metres event at the 1924 Summer Olympics. He died during World War II.
