= Şekip Engineri =

Turkish sprinter and politician

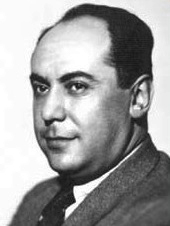

Personal information
- Nationality: Turkish
- Born: 1902
- Died: 12 January 1979 (aged 76–77)

Sport
- Sport: Track and field
- Event: 100m

Şekip Engineri (1902 – 12 January 1979) was a Turkish sprinter. He competed in the men's 100 metres event at the 1924 Summer Olympics. He was also a prominent politician, Member of Parliament, and a member of the CHP.
