= Bill Lowe (sprinter) =

Irish sprinter

Personal information
- Full name: William Joseph Lowe
- Nationality: Irish
- Born: 13 December 1901
- Died: 1971 (aged 69–70)

Sport
- Sport: Track and field
- Events: 100m, 200m

William Joseph Lowe (13 December 1901 – 1971) was an Irish sprinter. He competed in the men's 100 metres and the 200 metres events at the 1924 Summer Olympics.
