= Porritt baronets =

Baronetcy of Hampstead in the United Kingdom

The Porritt Baronetcy, of Hampstead in the County of London, is in the Baronetcy of the United Kingdom and was created on January 25 1963 for Sir Arthur Porritt, former Governor-General of New Zealand, President of the Royal College of Surgeons and Surgeon Sergeant to Queen Elizabeth II. The 1st Baronet was later created a life peer as Baron Porritt, of Wanganui in New Zealand and of Hampstead in Greater London.

The baronetcy was one of the last to be created before 1991 (when Sir Denis Thatcher was created a baronet).

== Porritt baronets, of Hampstead (25 January 1963) ==
- Sir Arthur Espie Porritt, Baron Porritt, 1st Baronet (1900–1994)
- The Honourable Sir Jonathon Espie Porritt, 2nd Baronet (born 1950)

The heir presumptive is the present holder's younger brother Jeremy Charles Porritt (born 1953).
The heir presumptive's heir apparent is his son Andrew Sebastian Alexander Porritt (born 1982).
