= Roy Norman (sprinter) =

Australian sprinter

Personal information
- Nationality: Australian
- Born: 11 September 1896
- Died: 3 March 1980 (aged 83)

Sport
- Sport: Sprinting
- Event: 200 metres

Roy Norman (11 September 1896 – 3 March 1980) was an Australian sprinter. He competed in the men's 200 metres at the 1924 Summer Olympics.
