= Mohamed Burhan =

Turkish sprinter

Personal information
- Nationality: Turkish
- Born: 1903

Sport
- Sport: Sprinting
- Event: 200 metres

Mohamed Burhan (born 1903, date of death unknown) was a Turkish sprinter. He competed in the men's 200 metres at the 1924 Summer Olympics.
