= Johannes van Kampen =

Dutch sprinter

Personal information
- Nationality: Dutch
- Born: 14 December 1899 The Hague, Netherlands
- Died: 3 July 1969 (aged 69) Flushing, New York, United States

Sport
- Sport: Track and field
- Events: 100m, 200m

Johannes van Kampen (14 December 1899 – 3 July 1969) was a Dutch sprinter. He competed in the men's 100 metres and the 200 metres events at the 1924 Summer Olympics.
