= Fritz Schedl =

Austrian sprinter

Personal information
- Nationality: Austrian
- Born: 1903

Sport
- Sport: Track and field
- Event: 100m

Friedrich "Fritz" Schedl (born 1903, date of death unknown) was an Austrian sprinter. He competed in the men's 100 metres event at the 1924 Summer Olympics.
