= Eugène Moedbeck =

Belgian sprinter

Personal information
- Nationality: Belgian
- Born: 13 February 1906
- Died: 25 April 1982 (aged 76)

Sport
- Sport: Track and field
- Event: 100m

Eugène Moedbeck (13 February 1906 – 25 April 1982) was a Belgian sprinter. He competed in the men's 100 metres event at the 1924 Summer Olympics.
