= Ernie Carr =

- Born: Ernest Thomas A. Carr; 13 March 1890 Brisbane, Queensland
- Died: 1965
- Notable relative: Slip Carr

Rugby union career
- Position: wing
International career
Years	Team	Apps	(Points)
1913–14	Wallabies	6	(3)

Ernest Thomas A. Carr (1890–1965) was a rugby union player who represented Australia.

Carr, a wing, was born in Brisbane, Queensland on 13 March 1890 but moved to Sydney, New South Wales.

He played rugby for NSW in 1913 and 1914 and after the World War, in 1919. He played as a Wallaby in six internationals against New Zealand – three each in 1913 and 1914. In a feat noted in Jack Pollard's rugby "bible" Australian Rugby – The Game and the Players, (Sydney, Ironbark 1994), Ernie scored three tries and his younger brother Edwin "Slip" Carr scored four in the 42–12 defeat of a Queensland XV by NSW in 1919. Ernie was the most capped rugby player of his family, with 16 NSW matches and 6 Australian tests.
