= Oto Seviško =

Latvian sprinter

Personal information
- Nationality: Latvian
- Born: 1 October 1892
- Died: 26 June 1958 (aged 65) Riga, Latvian SSR, Soviet Union

Sport
- Sport: Track and field
- Events: 100m, 200m

Oto Seviško (1 October 1892 – 26 June 1958) was a Latvian sprinter. He competed in the men's 100 metres and the 200 metres events at the 1924 Summer Olympics.
