= Knut Russell =

Swedish sprinter (1902–1961)

Personal information
- Nationality: Swedish
- Born: 23 June 1902 Norrköping, Sweden
- Died: 10 December 1961 (aged 59) Stockholm, Sweden

Sport
- Sport: Track and field
- Event: 100m

Knut Russell (23 June 1902 – 10 December 1961) was a Swedish sprinter. He competed in the men's 100 metres event at the 1924 Summer Olympics.
