= Giovanni Frangipane =

Italian athlete (1902–1967)

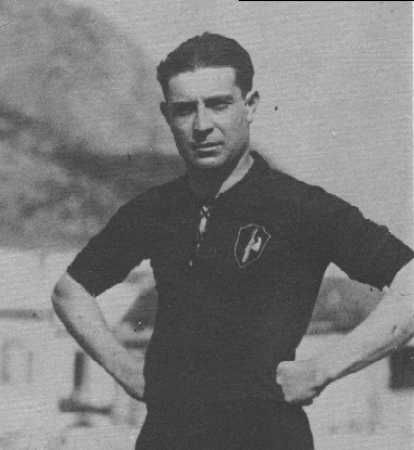
- Frangipane wearing a football jersey

Personal information
- Nationality: Italian
- Born: 9 February 1902 Palermo, Italy
- Died: 1967 (aged 64–65)

Sport
- Country: Italy
- Sport: Athletics
- Event: Sprint
- Club: US Italia Palermo

Achievements and titles
- Personal best: 100 m: 10.8 (1923)

Giovanni Frangipane (9 February 1902 – 1967) was an Italian sprinter and footballer.

== Biography ==
Frangipane competed in the men's 100 metres and the 4×100 metres relay events at the 1924 Summer Olympics. As of 2012, his results at the 100 metres Olympic event in 1924 (semi-finals) are the best result of an Italian athlete in this event. He was also a footballer for Palermo from 1919 to 1929.

== Olympic results ==
Year	Competition	Venue	Position	Event	Performance	Note
1924	Olympic Games	(France) Paris	SF	100 metres	11.2	
1924	Olympic Games	(France) Paris	SF	4×100 metres relay	at one metre to second	
