= Wilfred Hildreth =

Indian sprinter

Personal information
- Full name: Wilfred Reginald Hildreth
- Nickname: Will
- Nationality: Indian
- Born: 1 July 1896 Colaba, Bombay, India
- Died: 1979 (aged 82–83) Great Britain

Sport
- Sport: Track and field
- Events: 100m, 200m

Wilfred Reginald Hildreth (1 July 1896 – 1979) was an Indian and British sprinter. Disputedly, he competed in the men's 100 metres and 200 metres at the 1924 Summer Olympics. For more than two decades, he held the Indian national record in the men's 200 metres.

== Biography ==
Wilfred Reginald Hildreth was born on 1 July 1896 in Colaba, Bombay (now Mumbai), India, and is of Anglo-Indian descent. Growing up in India, he competed in sprinting and set a personal best in the men's 100 yards with a time of 10.2 seconds. In 1923, he set the Indian national record in the men's 200 metres with a time of 22.20 seconds, which lasted for more than two decades.

In international competition, Hildreth represented India at the 1924 Summer Olympics held in Paris, France. Up until 2024, Hildreth's participation in the men's 100 metres was disputed as he was listed as a non-starter in the official report but was recorded as competing in French sporting newspapers at the time. His participation in the 200 metres was also disputed as the report also recorded him as a non-starter though was claimed to have been injured during the race by a French newspaper according to Olympedia. If so, he competed in the eighth heat of the first round heats on 8 July against four other sprinters. He was also entered in the men's 400 metres, men's 400 metres hurdles, men's 400 metres, men's 4 × 100 metres relay, and men's 4 × 100 metres relay, but did not start in any of the events.

While he worked in India, Hildreth had a son named Peter Hildreth, who later became an athlete as well and competed at three different Olympic Games. Wilfred later moved to England and died in 1979.
