= Artūrs Gedvillo =

Latvian sprinter

Personal information
- Nationality: Latvian
- Born: 14 July 1904 Riga, Latvia
- Died: 5 May 1983 (aged 78)

Sport
- Sport: Track and field
- Event: 100m

Artūrs Gedvillo (14 July 1904 – 5 May 1983) was a Latvian sprinter. He competed in the men's 100 metres event at the 1924 Summer Olympics.
