= Cyril Coaffee =

Canadian sprinter

Personal information
- Born: 14 February 1897 Edmonton, Greater London, UK
- Died: 3 July 1945 (aged 48)

Sport
- Sport: Track and field
- Updated on 26 April 2012

Cyril Hillyard Coaffee (14 February 1897 – 3 July 1945) was a Canadian track and field athlete.

Born in Edmonton, Greater London UK, Coaffee tied Charlie Paddock's world record for the 100 yard dash at the 1922 Canadian championships. He also competed at the 1920 and 1924 Summer Olympics.

== Life ==
In 1905, Coaffee emigrated from Great Britain to Canada. His athletic career then began in 1915 at the North End Amateur Athletic Club in Winnipeg. Five years later he won the Canadian trials for the 1920 Olympic Games in Antwerp for the 100 meter dash with a time of 11.2 seconds. However, his country's Olympic team was initially not taken into account due to budget concerns, but a fundraiser hosted by the citizens of Winnipeg allowed him to participate.

In Antwerp, Coaffee started in the 100 meters and 200 meters. In both disciplines he was third in his runnings and neither qualified him for the later races. In 1922 at the Canadian Championships, he set the world record for the 100 yard dash, beating the record of Charlie Paddock with a time of 9.6 seconds. At the same event, he also won the 220 yard event. In October 1922, he then set a new Canadian Record for the 4 by 220 yard relay race, together with Laurie Armstrong, Billy Miller and Peavey Heffelfinger.

In 1924 he was captain of the Canadian delegation to the 1924 Olympic Games in Paris. In his 100-meter and 200 meter single runs as well as in the 4 by 100 meter relay he remained until the finals in each event. In 1926 and 1927, just as in 1922, he was decisive in the 100 and 220 yard events in the Canadian Championships. At this event, he was victorious over other Olympic champions, such as Percy Williams.

At the Canadian qualifiers for the 1928 Olympic Games he suffered from a tendon irritation in both legs and missed the qualification. His non-attendance at the Amsterdam games signaled the end of Coaffee's athletic career. In 1945, he died of a heart attack at the age of 48.

== Running style ==
Coaffee suffered from a partial paralysis in his arm. Due to this, he ran with a strong template, so that it gave the impression that his legs were shooting out from under him.

== Honours ==
- 1956 Admission to the Canada's Sports Hall of Fame
- 1960 Admission to the Canadian Olympic Hall of Fame
- 1982 Admission to the Manitoba Sports Hall of Fame and Museum
