= Arthur Porritt, Baron Porritt =

New Zealand physician

Colonel The Right Honourable The Lord Porritt Bt, GCMG, GCVO, CBE, KStJ, FRCS
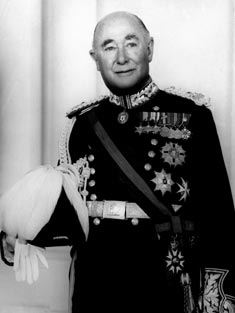
- Porritt in his uniform, c. 1970

11th Governor-General of New Zealand
- In office 1 December 1967 – 7 September 1972
- Monarch: Elizabeth II
- Prime Minister: Keith Holyoake; Jack Marshall
- Preceded by: The Lord Ballantrae
- Succeeded by: Sir Denis Blundell

2nd Chairman of the British Empire and Commonwealth Games Federation
- In office 1950–1966
- Preceded by: Sir James Leigh-Wood
- Succeeded by: Sir Alexander Ross

Personal details
- Born: 10 August 1900 Wanganui, New Zealand
- Died: 1 January 1994 (aged 93) London, England
- Education: University of Otago; Magdalen College, Oxford
- Profession: Surgeon

Military service
- Allegiance: United Kingdom
- Branch/service: British Army
- Years of service: 1940–1956
- Rank: Colonel
- Battles/wars: Second World War: Battle of France; North African Campaign; Operation Overlord
- Awards: Officer of the Order of the British Empire; Officer of the Legion of Merit (United States)
- Sports career
- Height: 187 cm (6 ft 2 in)
- Weight: 74 kg (163 lb)
- Sport: Athletics
- Event: Sprint
- Club: University of Oxford AC; Achilles Club

Sports achievements and titles
- Personal bests: 100 yd – 9.8 (1923); 200 m – 21.5 (1925)
Medal record
Representing New Zealand
Olympic Games
Bronze medal – third place	1924 Paris	100 m
World Student Games
Gold medal – first place	1924 Warsaw	100 m
Gold medal – first place	1924 Warsaw	200 m
Silver medal – second place	1924 Warsaw	110 m hurdles

Colonel Arthur Espie Porritt, Baron Porritt, Bt, GCMG, GCVO, CBE, KStJ, FRCS (10 August 1900 – 1 January 1994) was a New Zealand physician, military surgeon, statesman and athlete. He won a bronze medal at the 1924 Summer Olympics in the 100 m sprint. He served as the 11th governor-general of New Zealand from 1967 to 1972, becoming the first New Zealand-born person to hold the office.

== Early life ==
Porritt was born in Whanganui, New Zealand, the son of Ivy Elizabeth Porritt (née McKenzie) and Ernest Edward Porritt, a doctor. His mother died in 1914 during his first year at the Wanganui Collegiate School, and his father left soon after to serve in World War I. He became a keen athlete.

In 1920 Porritt began studying towards a medical degree at the University of Otago where he was a resident at Selwyn College and President of the Selwyn College Students' Association. In 1923 Porritt was awarded a Rhodes Scholarship, and he studied medicine from 1924 to 1926 at Magdalen College, Oxford. He married Mary Francis Wynne Bond, of Whanganui, in 1926.

== Sporting career ==
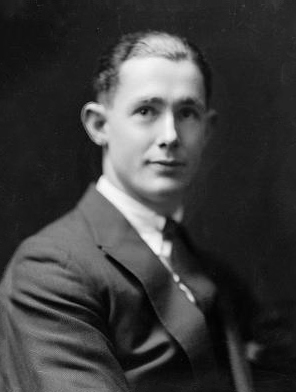
Porritt in 1923

Porritt represented New Zealand at the 1924 Summer Olympics in Paris, France, where he won a bronze medal in the 100 metre dash; the winner was Harold Abrahams (1899–1978). The race took place at 7 pm on 7 July 1924. Abrahams and Porritt dined together at 7 pm on 7 July every year thereafter, until Abrahams' death. The race was later immortalised in the film Chariots of Fire, but due to Porritt's modesty his name was changed to "Tom Watson". He also won two qualifying races in the 200 m, but did not advance in the semi-final. Porritt was captain of the New Zealand team at the 1928 Summer Olympics in Amsterdam but withdrew from the 100 m because of an injury.

Porritt is only one of two people to have the rare honour of twice being the New Zealand flag bearer at Olympic Games, the other being Les Mills.

After retirement from athletics, Porritt was New Zealand's team manager at the 1934 British Empire Games in London and 1936 Summer Olympics in Berlin. Porritt was the New Zealand member of the International Olympic Committee from 1934 until he was appointed governor-general in 1967. He was the first President of the IOC Medical Commission and served from 1961 to 1967.

Porritt served as chairman of the British Empire and Commonwealth Games Federation from the 1950 Auckland games to the 1966 Kingston games.

== Medical and military career ==
Porritt became a house surgeon at St Mary's Hospital, London, in 1926 and later that year was appointed surgeon to the Prince of Wales, the future King Edward VIII.

On 8 March 1940, Porritt was commissioned a lieutenant in the Royal Army Medical Corps with the service number 125494. He served in France until the evacuation from Dunkirk, then in Egypt, operating on seriously wounded soldiers from the North African campaign, and later landing in Normandy on D-Day. A war-substantive major by February 1943, he was granted the temporary rank of lieutenant colonel and the acting rank of colonel later that year; on 18 December 1943, he was appointed a consultant surgeon with the local rank of brigadier. He relinquished this position and his brigadier's rank on 1 September 1945, by which time he was a war-substantive lieutenant colonel. He ended his military career in September 1956, with the honorary rank of colonel in the Territorial Army.

Porritt was King's Surgeon to George VI from 1946 to 1952, and was Serjeant Surgeon to Queen Elizabeth II until 1967.

In 1955 Porritt was called to Eastbourne by the suspected serial killer John Bodkin Adams, to operate on his patient Jack Hullett for colon cancer. The operation was a moderate success but the death of Hullett under Adams' supervision a few months later followed soon after by the death of his wife Bobby, led to Adams being put on trial for Bobby's murder in 1957. He was acquitted but is suspected in up to 163 deaths.

Porritt was twice president of the Hunterian Society (once in 1951) and became president in 1960 of both the British Medical Association and the Royal College of Surgeons of England, the first person to hold the two positions simultaneously, and retained the presidency of the RCS until 1963.

In 1966 Porritt was elected president for two years of the Royal Society of Medicine but served only one year before leaving for New Zealand.

== Honours ==
Porritt was appointed an Officer of the Order of the British Empire (OBE) in 1943, and promoted to Commander (CBE) in 1945. He was decorated as an Officer of the US Legion of Merit on 14 November 1947. He was appointed a Knight Commander of the Order of Saint Michael and Saint George (KCMG) in 1950, and was promoted to Knight Grand Cross (GCMG) in 1967. In 1957 he was appointed a Knight Commander of the Royal Victorian Order (KCVO), being promoted to Knight Grand Cross (GCVO) in 1970. He was also made a Knight of the Order of St John of Jerusalem (KStJ) in 1957.

Porritt was created a Baronet of Hampstead on 25 January 1963. When he was elevated to be a Life Peer on 5 February 1973, he chose to honour his home town and was created Baron Porritt, of Wanganui in New Zealand and of Hampstead in Greater London.

== Governor-General ==
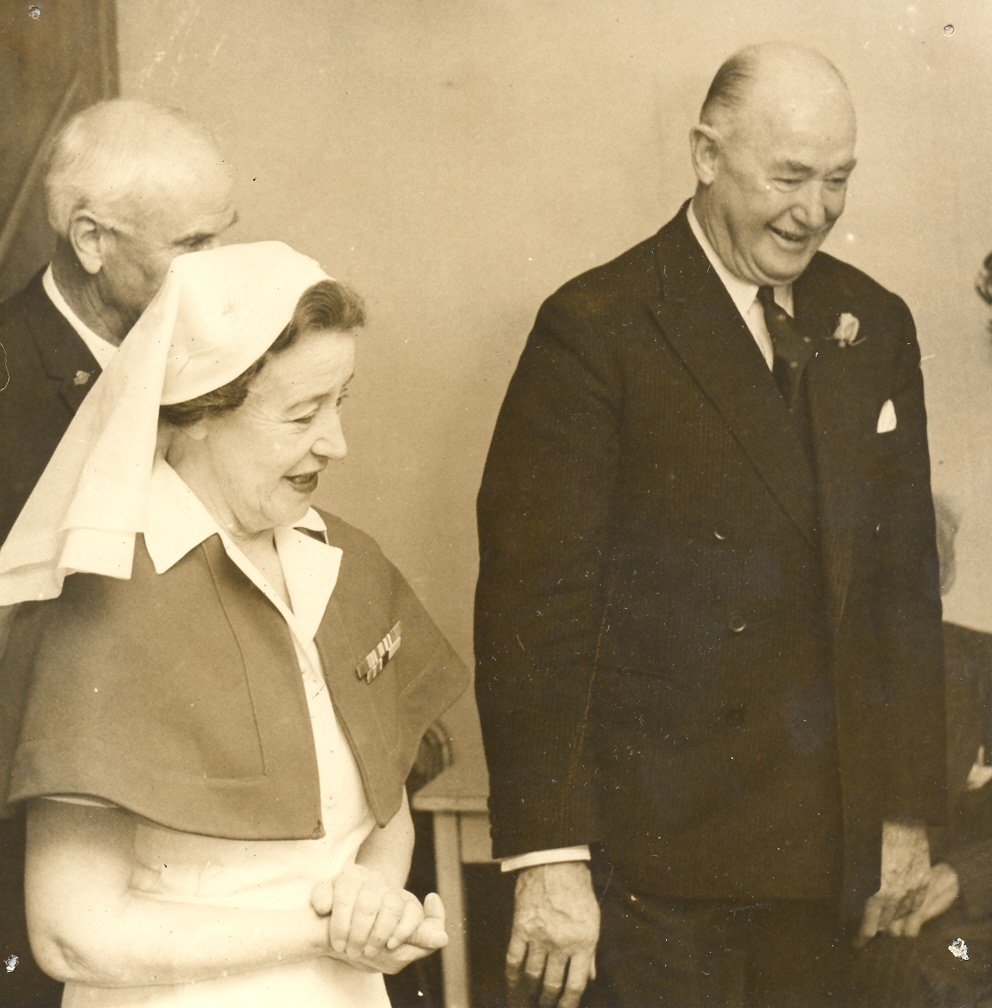
Sir Arthur Porritt visits Levin War Veterans Home on 23 July 1969.

In 1967 Porritt returned to New Zealand to be appointed by the Queen on the advice of Prime Minister Keith Holyoake as the 11th Governor-General of New Zealand, and the first to be born in New Zealand,(although one of his predecessors, Lord Freyberg, moved to New Zealand when he was two). His term marked a turning point in the country's constitutional history: his successors have all been New Zealanders. An earlier Gallup poll for the Auckland Star newspaper found 43 per cent of respondents preferred Britons for the role, while 41 per cent favoured New Zealanders and 6 per cent candidates from other Commonwealth countries. Newspapers at the time welcomed the appointment, the Greymouth Star saying that it was "an acknowledgement of New Zealand's maturity."

=== Controversies ===
Prior to the 1969 general election in September of that year, Porritt sparked a heated debate with a Labour candidate Eddie Isbey when he argued in a speech to the Southern Cross Medical Care Society that the welfare state was "uneconomic".

Later, Porritt's wife also created controversy, when she replied to a question on equal pay for women by stating: "Perhaps when New Zealand, like India and Israel, produces a woman prime minister it will be time to call a halt to the emancipation movement".

At his last Waitangi Day speech in 1972, Porritt caused more controversy by stating that: "Maori-Pakeha relationships are being dealt with adequately through the biological process of intermarriage."

At the end of his term in September 1972 Porritt returned to England.

=== Memorials ===
In Christchurch, New Zealand, a park was named Porritt Park in the suburb of Wainoni. The park surrounded by the Avon River / Ōtākaro became home to Canterbury Hockey, Canterbury Rowing, Canterbury Touch Rugby and also used as a venue for Cricket. Porritt Primary School in Napier opened in 1975, named in honour of his service to New Zealand. He has also a dedication of a running track in Hamilton, New Zealand named Porritt Stadium.

=== Freemasonry ===
Porritt was initiated in Oxford University's Apollo University Lodge No. 357 on 13 June 1925, and later joined other English Constitution lodges, including Sancta Maria Lodge No. 2682 (a medical practitioners' lodge), Prince of Wales's Lodge No. 259 (a so-called 'red apron' lodge as it nominates one of the 19 Grand Stewards each year, who wear red aprons), and Royal Alpha Lodge No. 16 (membership of which is at the personal invitation of the Grand Master).

During his term as Governor-General (1968–1971), Porritt served as Grand Master of the Grand Lodge of New Zealand.

== Death ==
Lord Porritt died in London at the age of 93 on 1 January 1994. and his wife died in 1998. His son, Jonathon Porritt CBE, (born 6 July 1950), the environmentalist, writer and sustainability advocate, succeeded to the baronetcy.

== Arms ==
Coat of arms of Arthur Porritt, Baron Porritt
Notes The arms of Arthur Porritt consist of: Crest On a wreath Or and Gules, a demi Heraldic Antelope Gules armed Azure collared Or, holding a Torch of the last enflamed proper between two Fern Fronds Vert Escutcheon Or, a serpent in bend vert between two lions' heads erased gules, on a chief of the last two swords points upwards in saltire of the first, between as many roses argent both surmounted by another gules barbed and seeded proper Supporters On the dexter side an Eagle and on the sinister side a Tui Bird both proper Motto Sapienter et fortiter ferre

Government offices
Preceded by Sir Bernard Fergusson	Governor-General of New Zealand; 1967–1972	Succeeded by Sir Denis Blundell
Professional and academic associations
Preceded by	President of the British Medical Association; 1960–1961	Succeeded by Sir George Douglas Robb
Preceded by Sir James Ross	President of the Royal College of Surgeons of England; 1960–1963	Succeeded by Sir Russell Brock
Preceded by Lord Cohen of Birkenhead	President of the Royal Society of Medicine; 1966–1967	Succeeded by Sir Hector MacLennan
Baronetage of the United Kingdom
New creation	Baronet (of Hampstead); 1963–1994	Succeeded by Jonathon Porritt
