= Stefan Kostrzewski =

Polish sprinter (1902–1999)

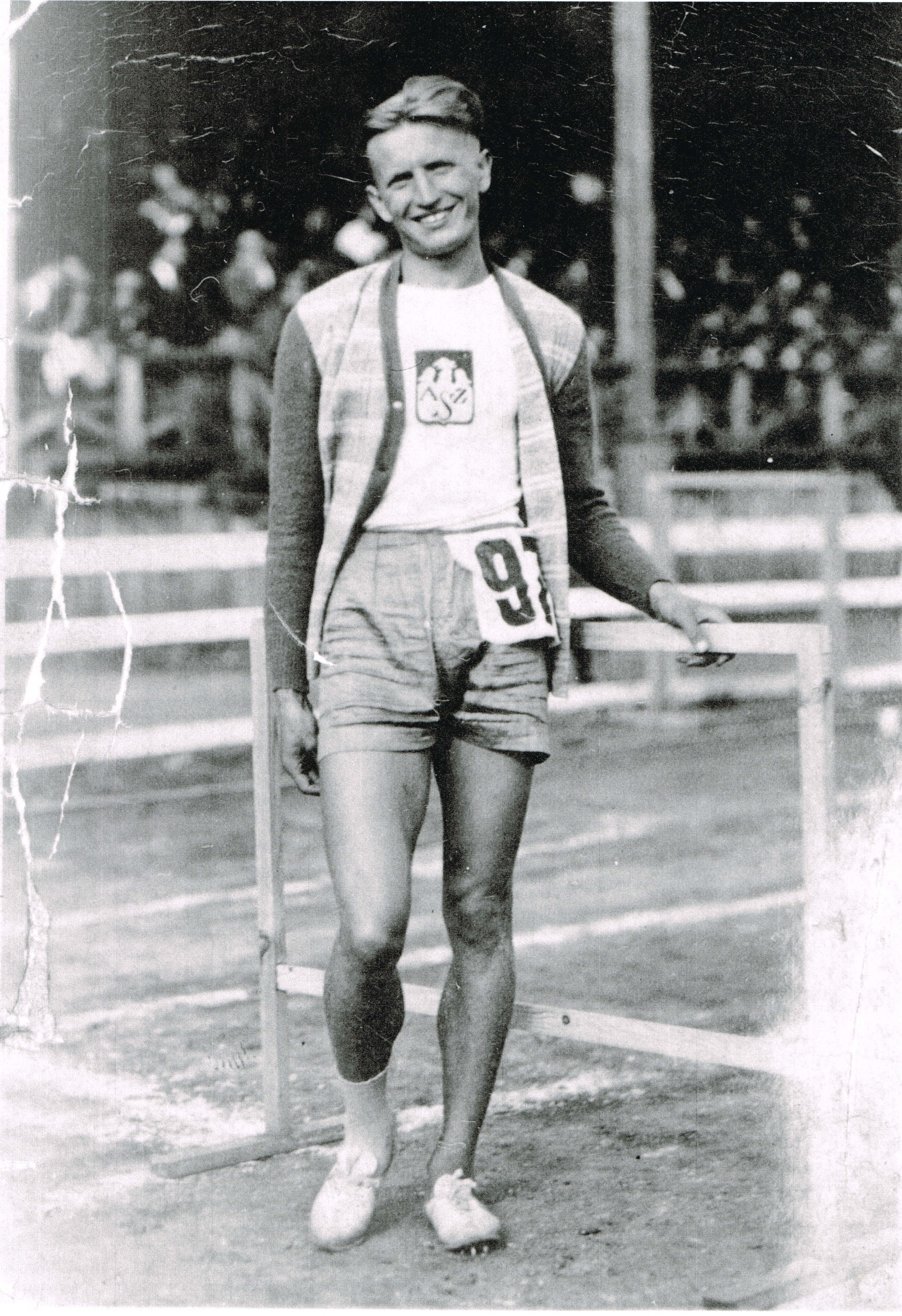
- Stefan Kostrzewski in 1922

Personal information
- Nationality: Polish
- Born: 4 August 1902 Łódź, Congress Poland
- Died: 24 February 1999 (aged 96)

Sport
- Sport: Sprinting
- Event: 400 metres

Stefan Kostrzewski (4 August 1902 – 24 February 1999) was a Polish sprinter. He competed in the men's 400 metres at the 1928 Summer Olympics.
