= Reijo Halme =

Finnish sprinter (1899–1941)

Personal information
- Nationality: Finnish
- Born: 13 March 1899 Tampere, Finland
- Died: 8 April 1941 (aged 42) Tampere, Finland

Sport
- Sport: Track and field
- Events: 100m, 4×100m

Reijo Halme (13 March 1899 – 8 April 1941) was a Finnish sprinter. He competed in the men's 100 metres and the 4×100 metres events at the 1924 Summer Olympics.
