= Henricus Cockuyt =

Belgian sprinter

Personal information
- Nationality: Belgian
- Born: 14 July 1903
- Died: 3 December 1993 (aged 90)

Sport
- Sport: Track and field
- Event: 100m

Henricus Cockuyt (14 July 1903 – 3 December 1993) was a Belgian sprinter. He competed in the men's 100 metres event at the 1924 Summer Olympics.
