= Sławosz Szydłowski =

Polish athlete (1894–1952)

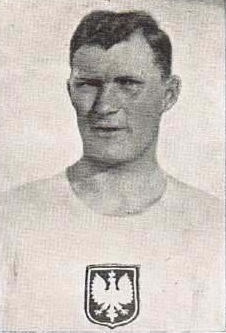

Personal information
- Nationality: Polish
- Born: 20 July 1894 Staszów, Poland
- Died: 24 January 1952 (aged 57) Warsaw, Poland
- Height: 184 cm (6 ft 0 in)
- Weight: 85 kg (187 lb)

Sport
- Sport: Athletics
- Events: Discus throw Javelin throw
- Club: AZS Warszawa

Sławosz Mieczysław Szydłowski (20 July 1894 – 24 January 1952) was a Polish athlete who competed at the 1924 Summer Olympics.

== Career ==
Szydłowski competed in the men's discus throw and the men's javelin throw at the 1924 Olympic Games in Paris, France.

The following year he finished third behind Béla Szepes in the javelin throw event at the 1925 AAA Championships.

Olympic Games
Preceded by first	Flagbearer for Poland; 1924 Paris	Succeeded by Marian Cieniewski
