= Valter Ever =

Estonian athlete (1902–1981)

Personal information
- Nationality: Estonian
- Born: 6 November 1902 Tallinn, Governorate of Estonia, Russian Empire
- Died: 10 July 1982 (aged 79) Stockholm, Sweden

Sport
- Sport: Athletics

Valter Ever (6 November 1902 – 10 July 1981) was an Estonian athlete. He competed in four events at the 1924 Summer Olympics.
