= Karel Pott =

Portuguese sprinter

Personal information
- Nationality: Portuguese
- Born: 20 August 1904 Lourenço Marques, Portuguese Mozambique
- Died: 16 December 1953 (aged 49)

Sport
- Sport: Track and field
- Event: 100m

Karel Pott (20 August 1904 – 16 December 1953) was a Portuguese sprinter. He competed in the men's 100 metres event at the 1924 Summer Olympics.
