= Howard Kinsman =

South African sprinter (1900–1960)

Personal information
- Nationality: South African
- Born: 9 October 1900 Ladysmith, Colony of Natal
- Died: 10 January 1960 (aged 59) Cape Town, Western Cape

Sport
- Sport: Sprinting
- Event: 200 metres

Howard Philip Kinsman (9 October 1900 – 10 January 1960) was a South African sprinter who competed at two Olympic Games.

== Career ==
Kinsman competed in the 200 metres at the 1924 Summer Olympics and the 1928 Summer Olympics.

Kinsman won the British AAA Championships title in the 220 yards event at the 1924 AAA Championships, where he defeated Eric Liddell into second place.
