= Eugen Uuemaa =

Estonian decathlete (1903–1940)

Personal information
- Nationality: Estonian
- Born: 14 July 1903 Tartu, Governorate of Livonia, Russian Empire
- Died: 25 August 1940 (aged 37) Tallinn, then part of Estonian SSR, Soviet Union

Sport
- Sport: Athletics
- Event: Decathlon

Eugen Uuemaa (14 July 1903 – 25 August 1940) was an Estonian athlete. He competed in the men's decathlon at the 1924 Summer Olympics. He was executed by the Soviets during World War II.
