= Sean Lavan =

Irish sprinter

Personal information
- Nationality: Irish
- Born: 21 December 1898 Kiltimagh, Kingdom of Great Britain and Ireland
- Died: 5 August 1973 (aged 74)

Sport
- Sport: Sprinting
- Event: 200 metres

Sean Lavan (21 December 1898 – 5 August 1973) was an Irish sprinter. He competed in the 200 metres at the 1924 Summer Olympics and the 1928 Summer Olympics.
