= Joseph Jackson (athlete) =

French sprinter

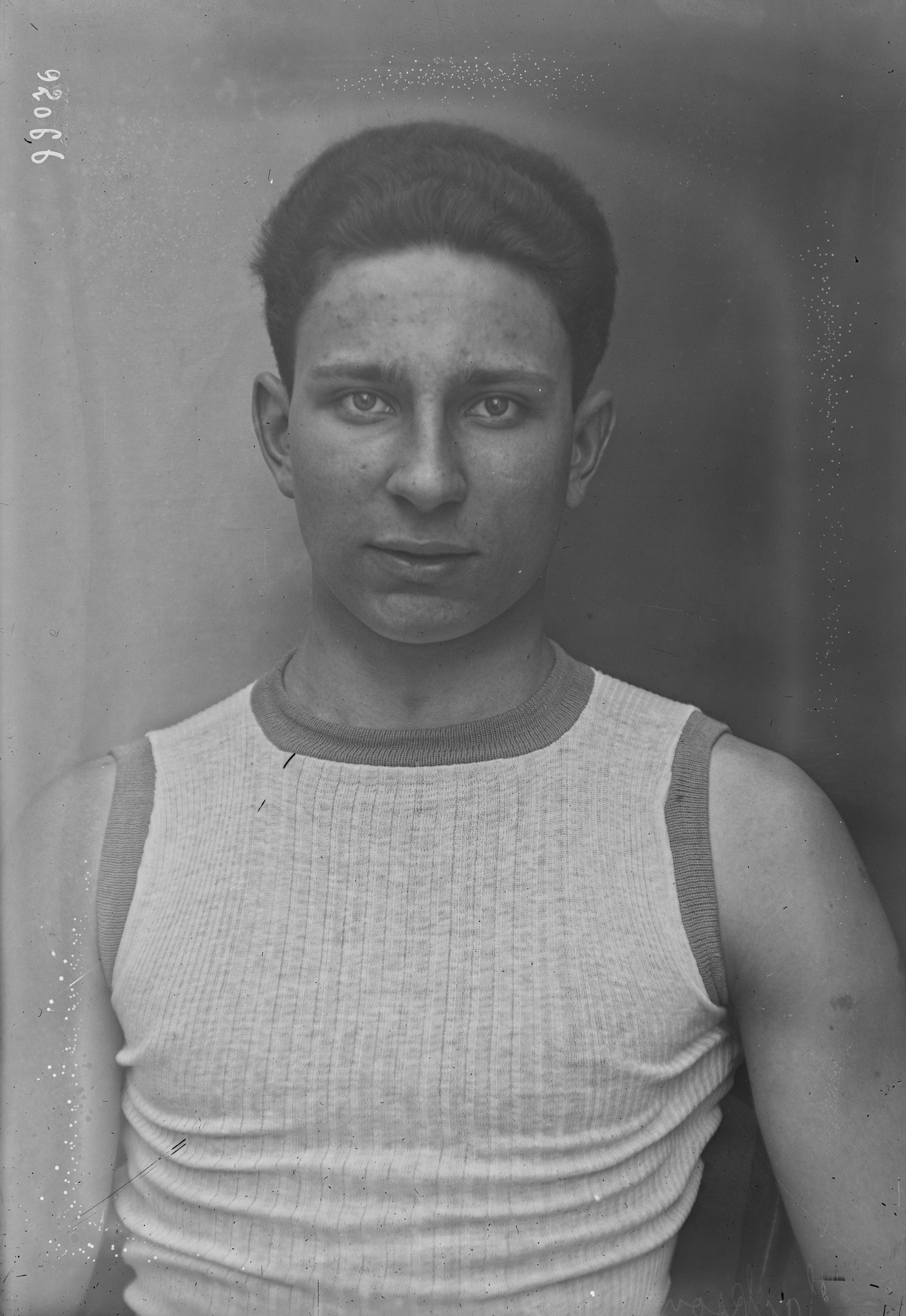

Personal information
- Nationality: French
- Born: 11 November 1904
- Died: 13 June 1981 (aged 76)

Sport
- Sport: Sprinting
- Event: 200 metres

Joseph Jackson (11 November 1904 – 13 June 1981) was a French sprinter. He competed in the men's 200 metres at the 1924 Summer Olympics.
