= Józef Jaworski =

Polish middle-distance runner

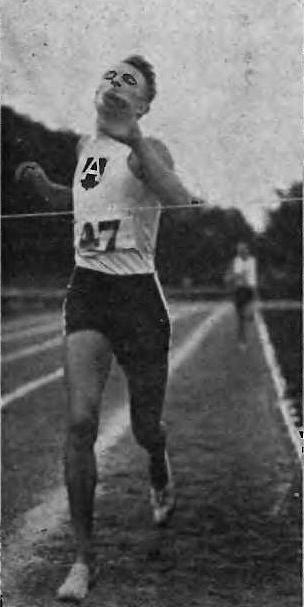

Personal information
- Nationality: Polish
- Born: 19 October 1903 Zgierz, Poland
- Died: 1 September 1939 (aged 35) Oksywie, Poland

Sport
- Sport: Middle-distance running
- Event: 800 metres

Józef Jaworski (19 October 1903 – 1 September 1939) was a Polish middle-distance runner. He competed in the men's 800 metres at the 1924 Summer Olympics. He was killed in action during World War II.
