= Walter Strebi =

Swiss sprinter

Personal information
- Nationality: Swiss
- Born: 24 October 1903
- Died: 2 May 1981 (aged 77)

Sport
- Sport: Track and field
- Event: 100m

Walter Strebi (24 October 1903 – 2 May 1981) was a Swiss sprinter. He competed in the men's 100 metres event at the 1924 Summer Olympics.

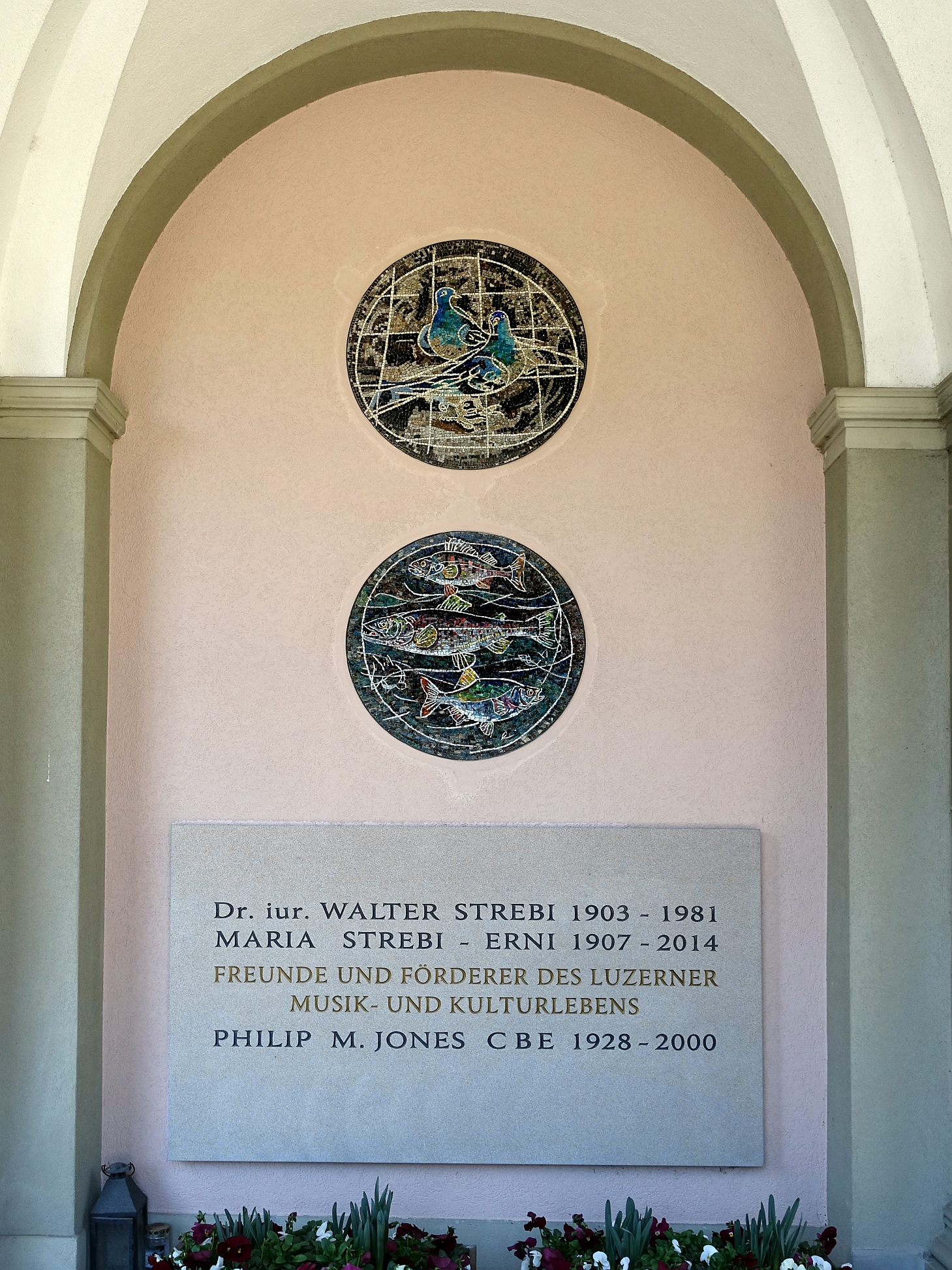
Memorial to Walter Strebi, his wife and son-in-law Philip Mark Jones, Friedental cemetery, Lucerne

In later life, Strebi and his wife were well known in the musical life of Lucerne. He became a lawyer and judge, and married Maria Erni, sister of Hans Erni.
