= Pierre Parrain =

French sprinter

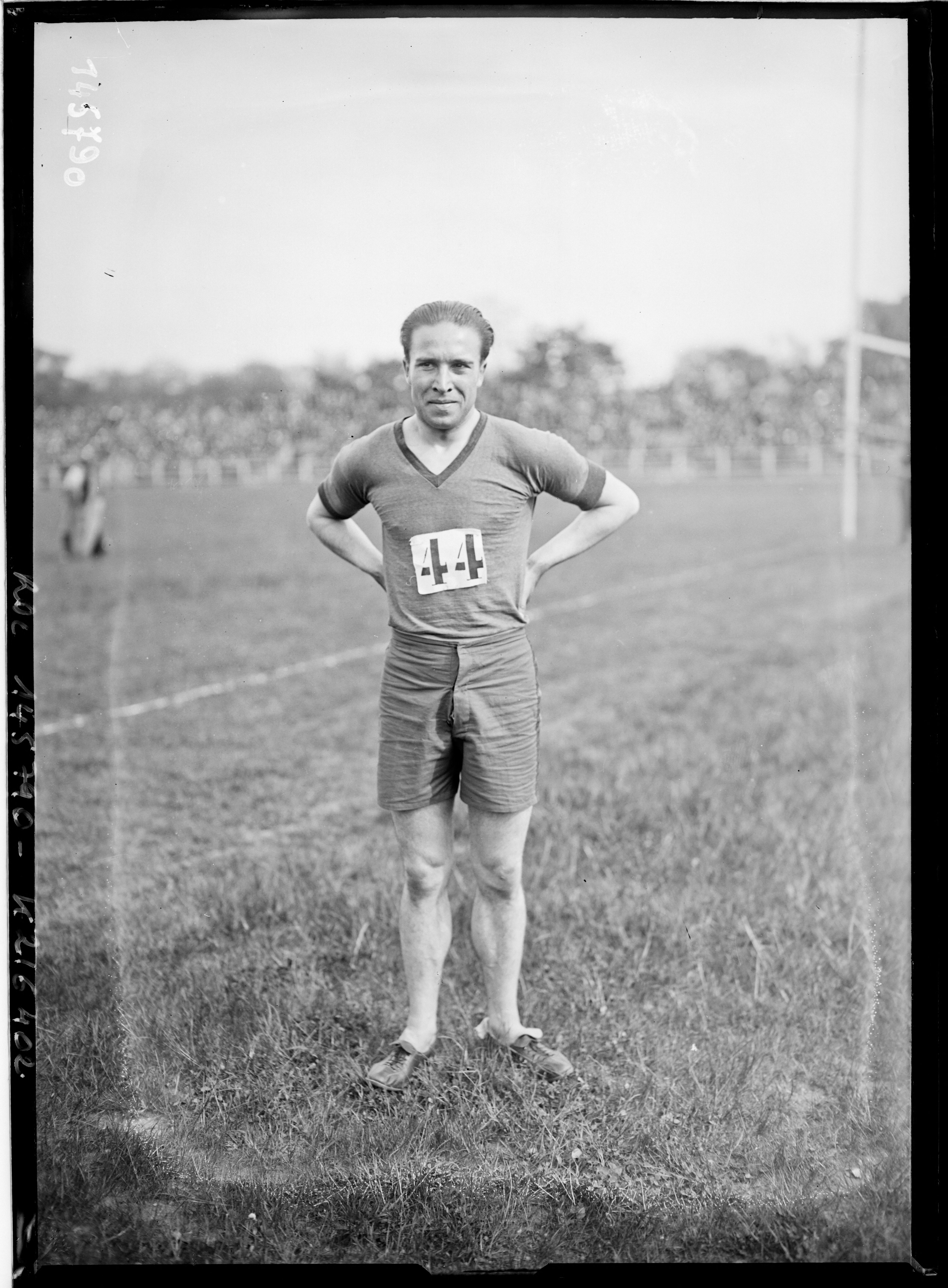

Personal information
- Nationality: French
- Born: Pierre Charles Parrain; 29 April 1904 Béville-le-Comte, France
- Died: 12 November 1984 (aged 80) Massy, Essonne, France

Sport
- Sport: Sprinting
- Event: 200 metres

Pierre Charles Parrain (29 April 1904 – 12 November 1984) was a French sprinter. He competed in the men's 200 metres at the 1924 Summer Olympics.
