= George Hill (sprinter) =

American sprinter

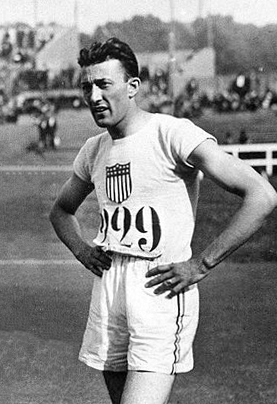
- George Hill at the 1924 Olympics

Personal information
- Born: April 17, 1901 Lansford, Pennsylvania, United States
- Died: January 18, 1992 (aged 90) Mannington township, New Jersey, United States
- Education: University of Pennsylvania
- Height: 1.80 m (5 ft 11 in)
- Weight: 64 kg (141 lb)

Sport
- Sport: Athletics
- Event: 200 m
- Club: Penn Quakers, Philadelphia

Achievements and titles
- Personal best: 220 yd – 21.7 (1924)

George Leroy Hill (April 17, 1901 – January 18, 1992) was an American sprint runner who finished fourth in the 200 m at the 1924 Olympic Games. He graduated from University of Pennsylvania in 1925 with a degree in economics.
