= André Mourlon =

French sprinter

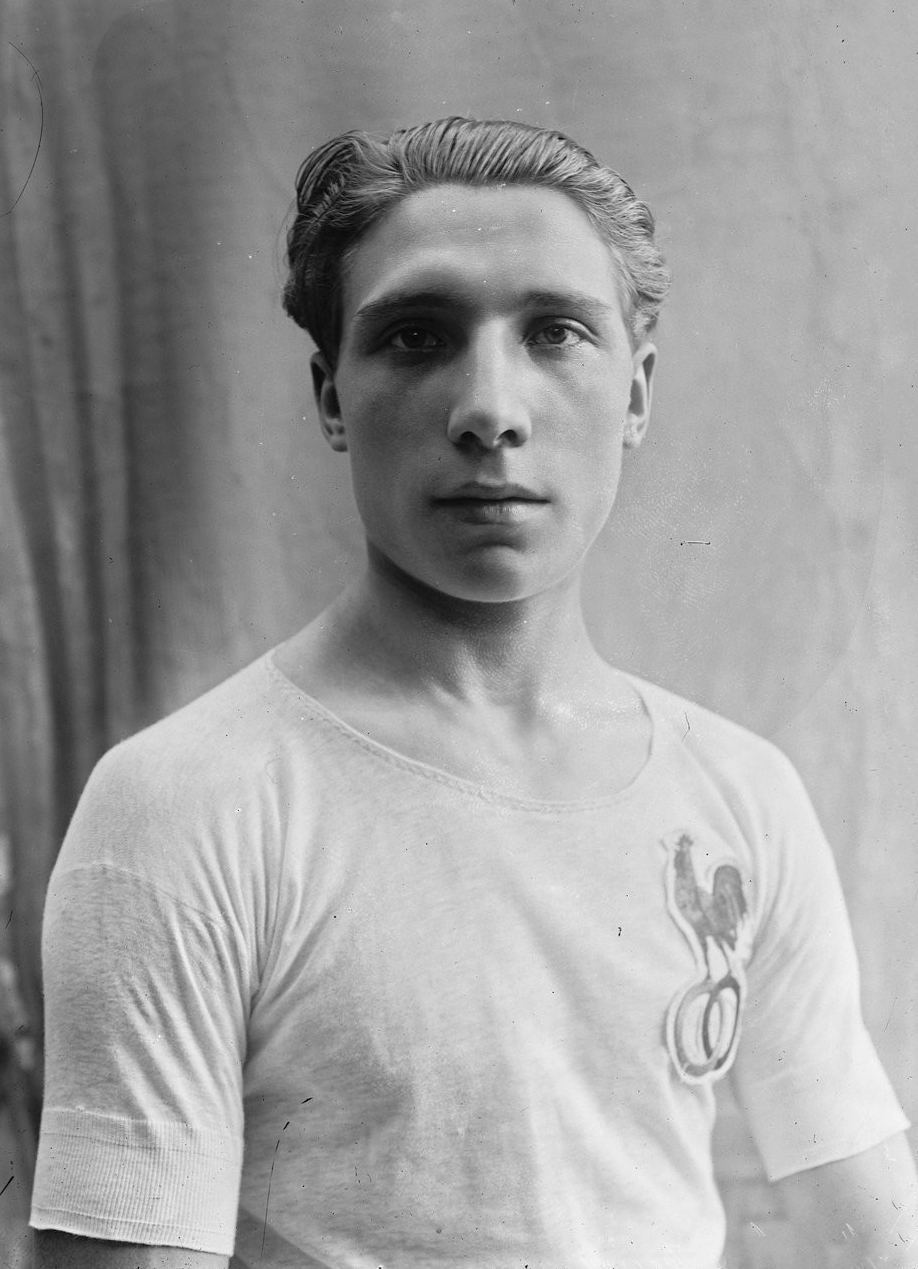
- André Mourlon in 1921

Personal information
- Nationality: French
- Born: 9 October 1903 Paris, France
- Died: 31 July 1970 (aged 66)
- Height: 1.66 m (5 ft 5 in)

Sport
- Sport: Track and field
- Event(s): 100 m, 200 m
- Club: UAI Paris

Achievements and titles
- Personal best(s): 100 m – 10.6 (1927); 200 m – 21.6 (1924)

André Mourlon (9 October 1903 – 31 July 1970) was a French sprinter who competed at the 1924 and 1928 Summer Olympics in the 100 m, 200 m and 4×100 metre relay. He finished in fourth-fifth place in the relay and failed to reach the finals of his individual events. His elder brother René was also an Olympic sprinter.
