= Gvido Jekals =

Latvian athlete

Personal information
- Nationality: Latvian
- Born: 1 July 1904 Riga, Latvia
- Died: 2 January 1969 (aged 64) Cuyahoga Falls, Ohio, United States

Sport
- Sport: Track and field
- Event(s): 100m, 200m, decathlon

Gvido Jekals (1 July 1904 – 2 January 1969) was a Latvian sprinter and decathlete. He competed in three events at the 1924 Summer Olympics.
