= George Hester =

Canadian sprinter (1902–1951)

Personal information
- Nickname: Buck Hester
- Born: August 20, 1902 Windsor, Ontario, Canada
- Died: December 8, 1951 (aged 49) Indianapolis

Sport
- Sport: Track and field
- Event(s): 100m, 200m

George Black Hester (August 20, 1902 – December 8, 1951) was a Canadian sprinter. He competed at the 1924 and 1928 Summer Olympics. He competed for Mercersburg Academy, under the guidance of Jimmy Curran, and the University of Michigan.
