= Maurice Degrelle =

French sprinter

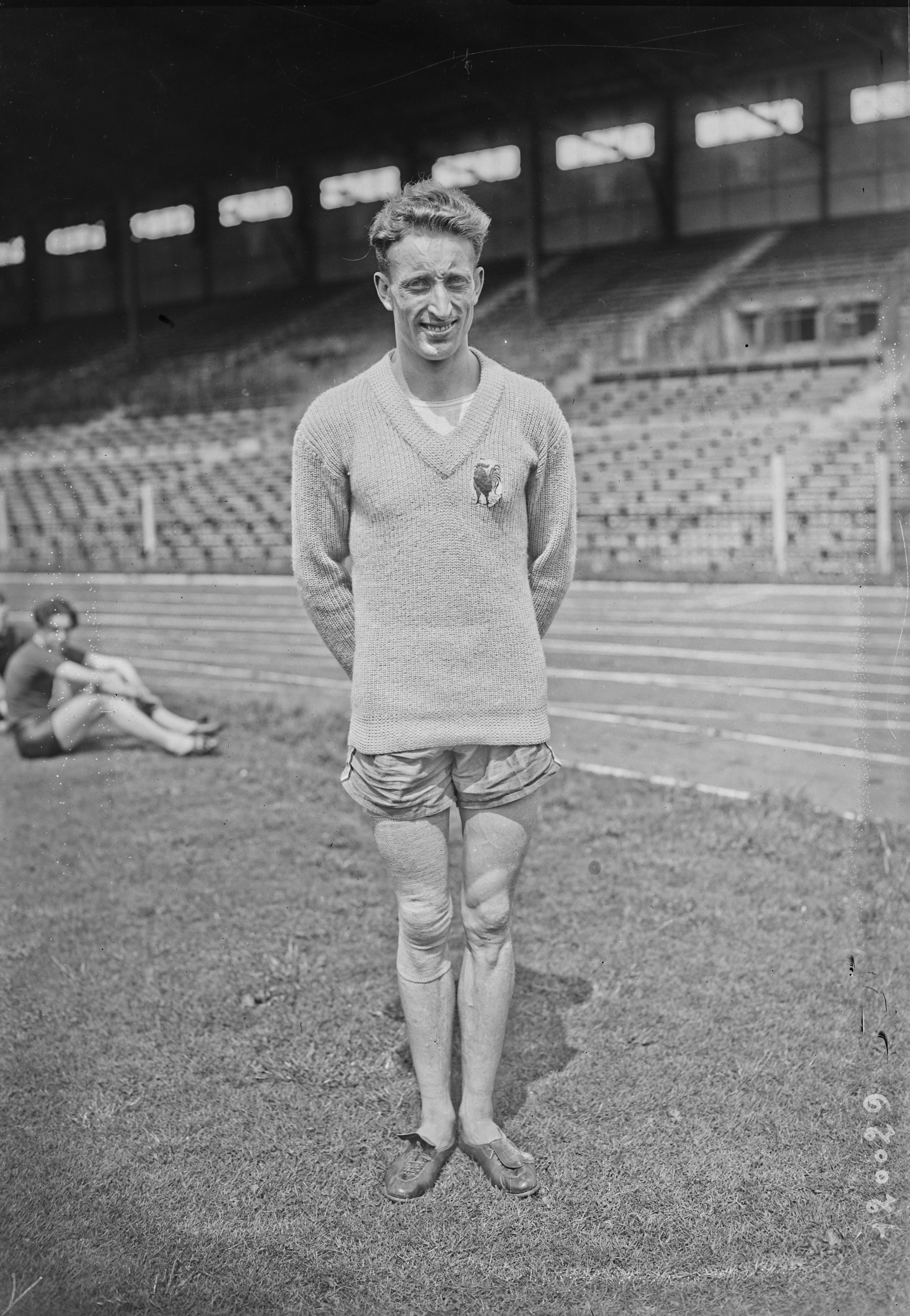
- Maurice Degrelle in 1927.

Personal information
- Nationality: French
- Born: 28 June 1901 Sars-Poteries, France
- Died: 30 April 1987 (aged 85) Sars-Poteries, France

Sport
- Sport: Track and field
- Event(s): 100m, 200m, 4 × 100 m

Maurice Degrelle (28 June 1901 – 30 April 1987) was a French sprinter. He competed at the 1924 and 1928 Summer Olympics.
