= Chester Bowman =

American sprinter (1901–1936)

Personal information
- Nationality: American
- Born: November 22, 1901 West Long Branch, New Jersey, United States
- Died: May 30, 1936 (aged 34) West Long Branch, New Jersey, United States

Sport
- Sport: Track and field
- Event: 100m
- College team: Syracuse

Chester A. "Chet" Bowman (November 22, 1901 – May 30, 1936) was an American sprinter who competed in the 1924 Summer Olympics.

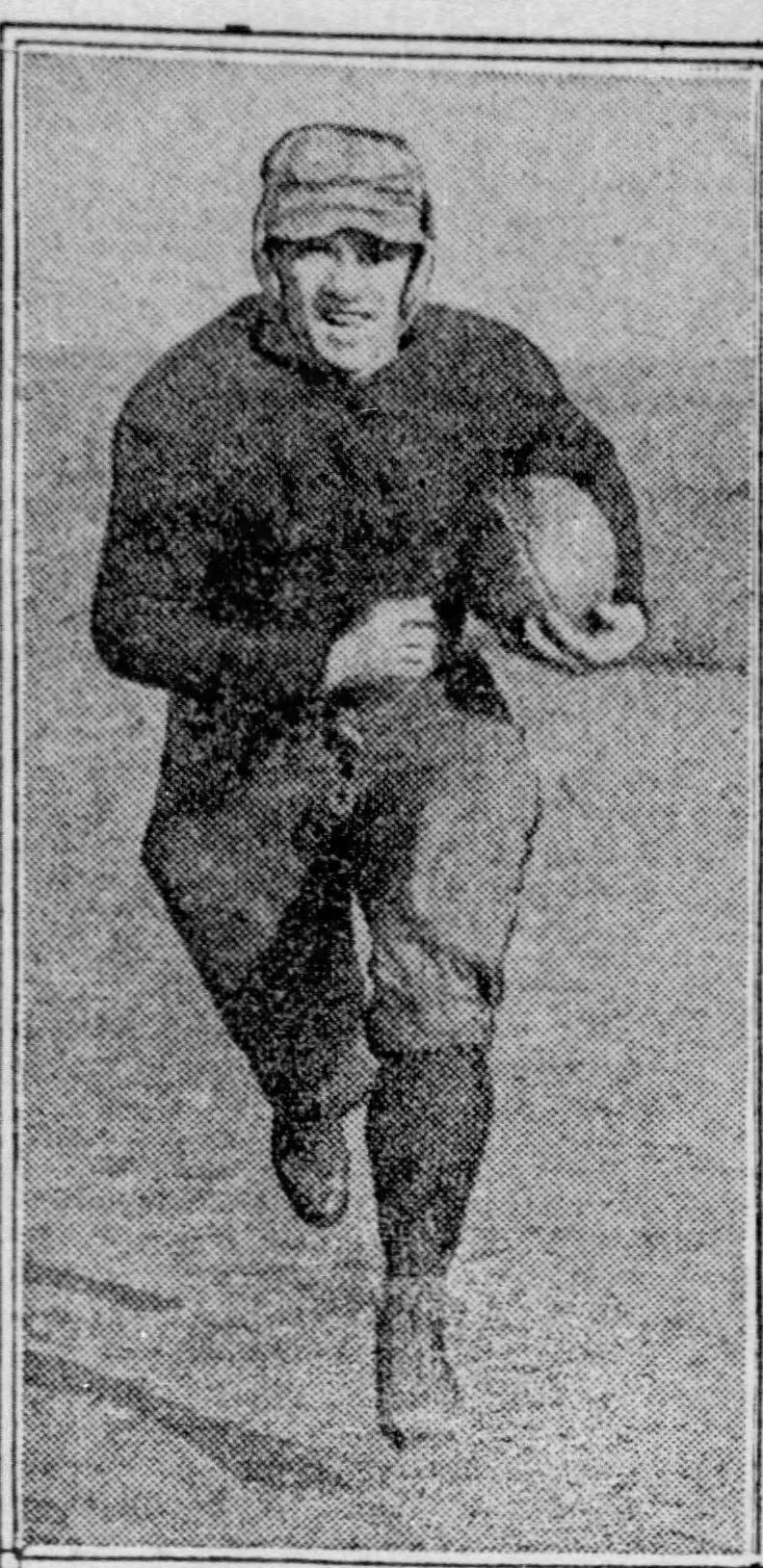
Bowman as a Syracuse Orange halfback

Bowman competed in football and track and field for the Syracuse Orange. He was a fast running back, and his coach was rumored to have made the football field wider to give him an advantage.

On May 31, 1926, Bowman was found "slumped behind the wheel of his automobile in a garage near his home," dead of an apparent heart attack.
