= Joseph Hilger =

Luxembourgish athlete

Personal information
- Nationality: Luxembourgish
- Born: 1903
- Died: 29 March 1990 (aged 86–87)

Sport
- Sport: Track and field
- Event(s): 100m, 200m, long jump

Joseph Hilger (1903 – 29 March 1990) was a Luxembourgish sprinter and long jumper. He competed in three events at the 1924 Summer Olympics.
