= Bayes Norton =

American sprinter

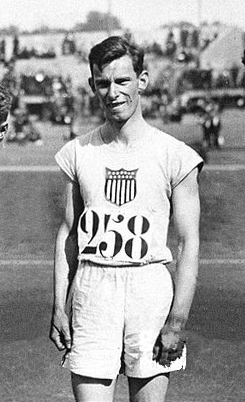
- Bayes Norton at the 1924 Olympics

Personal information
- Born: September 23, 1903 Vineyard Haven, Massachusetts, United States
- Died: October 21, 1967 (aged 64) Gambier, Ohio, United States
- Education: Yale University, University of Oxford
- Height: 1.78 m (5 ft 10 in)
- Weight: 66 kg (146 lb)

Sport
- Sport: Athletics
- Event: 200 m
- Club: Yale Bulldogs, New Haven; University of Oxford AC; Achilles Club

Achievements and titles
- Personal best: 200 m – 21.8 (1924)

Bayes Marshall Norton (September 23, 1903 – October 21, 1967) was an American sprint runner. In 1924 he finished second in the 200 m at the U.S. Olympic Trials and fifth at the 1924 Olympic Games. He won a Rhodes Scholarship and in the late 1920s ran for the University of Oxford. He later became a professor of chemistry at Kenyon College in Gambier, Ohio. As a government consultant he contributed to the Manhattan Project and to Rockets, Guns and Targets, an official U.S. Government history book on science during World War II.
