= Lauri Härö =

Finnish sprinter (1899–1980)

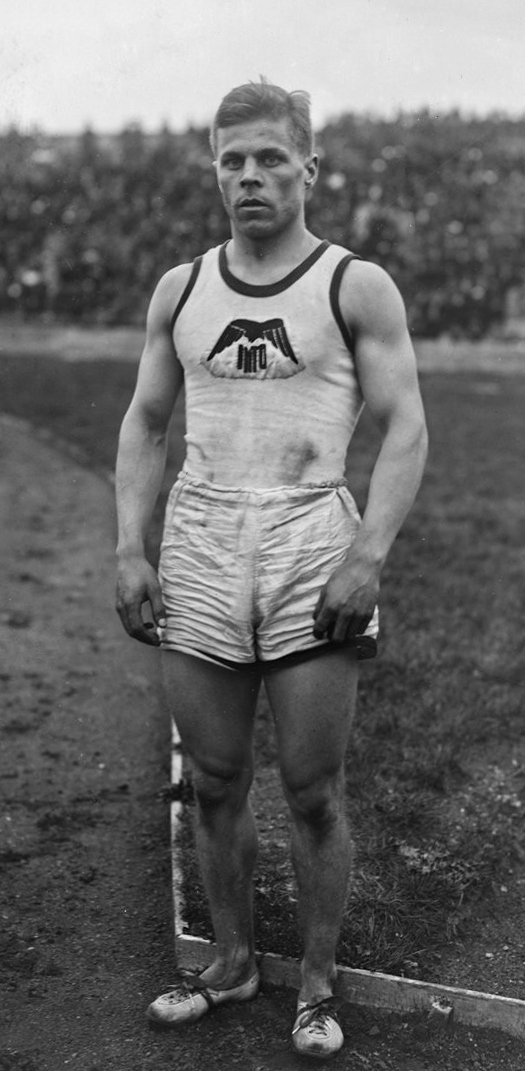
- Lauri Härö in 1922

Personal information
- Nicknames: Pippuri-Lasse, Pohjolan Paddock
- Nationality: Finnish
- Born: 8 June 1899 Mäntyharju, Finland
- Died: 30 March 1980 (aged 80) Helsinki, Finland
- Height: 1.68 m (5 ft 6 in)
- Weight: 64 kg (141 lb)

Sport
- Sport: Track and field
- Event(s): 100 m, 200 m
- Club: Kotkan Into, Kotka

Achievements and titles
- Personal best(s): 100 m – 10.8 (1922); 200 m – 22.2 (1923)

Lauri Jaakoppi Härö (8 June 1899 – 30 March 1980) was a Finnish sprinter. He competed in the 100 m, 200 m and 4 × 100 m events at the 1924 Summer Olympics, but failed to reach the finals.
