= Slip Carr =

Australian rugby union player and sprinter

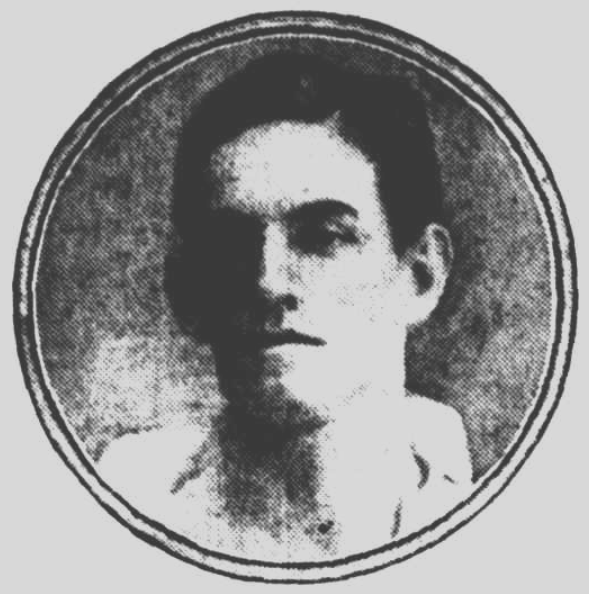
- Born: Edwin William Carr; 9 June 1899 Burwood, New South Wales
- Died: 3 July 1971 (aged 72) Dundas, New South Wales
- Height: 169 cm (5 ft 7 in)
- Weight: 67 kg (10 st 8 lb)
- School: Sydney Grammar School
- Notable relative(s): Ernie Carr, Edwin Carr, Leo Carr

Rugby union career
- Position: wing
International career
Years	Team	Apps	(Points)
1921	Wallabies	4	(9)

Edwin William "Slip" Carr (9 June 1899 – 3 July 1971) was an Australian athlete who equalled the Olympic Record for the 100m sprint in 1923 and represented Australia at the Paris Olympic Games in 1924, in the 100m and 200m sprints. He represented Australia in rugby union, playing in tests against the South African Springboks and the New Zealand All Blacks in 1921.

== Early years ==
Born in Sydney, New South Wales, Australia, he attended Sydney Grammar School. In 1916 when under the legal age, he attempted unsuccessfully to enlist in the Australian Imperial Force fighting in WW1. He enlisted in 1918, and served in the 6th Australian Light Horse regiment in Egypt and Palestine as a Trooper. Carr returned to Australia in 1919.

== Rugby union career ==
In 1921, he played in four test matches for the NSW Waratahs. The first three matches were against the Springboks in Sydney. The Waratahs then toured New Zealand and defeated the All Blacks in Christchurch 17-0. In 1986 the Australian Rugby Union conferred Test Match status on all international matches played by the NSW Waratahs between 1919 and 1929.

Sweetacres Champion Chewing Gum Collector card of Slip Carr, c. 1930

== Athletic career ==
At the 1921/22 Australasian Track & Field Championships in Adelaide, Carr won the 100 yards and 220 yards championships (in 9.9 sec and 21.5 sec, respectively). He set a new Australasian 220 yards record on the straight course.

Known for his speed, Carr was nicknamed 'Slippery', shortened to 'Slip'.

In July 1923, he captained the Australian team that won the Imperial Relay Race at the British Legion Sports Meetimg at Wembley, England. He and other Australian athletes then competed in track and field meets across Europe. During an extensive tour, Carr equalled the then Olympic record for 100m (10.6 sec), in Copenhagen, Denmark. He set new world record marks over 60m, of 6.7 sec and 6.6 sec in Kladno, Czechoslovakia.

Carr was selected to represent Australia at the Paris Olympic Games, 1924, in the 100m and 200m sprints, and was the flagbearer at the opening ceremony. Before the heats, he was injured in training and did not advance beyond the semifinals.

Carr died in Dundas, New South Wales, Australia on 3 July 1971.

== Notable relatives ==
Carr's eldest brother Ernie Carr played rugby for Australia, his other brother Leo played representative tennis for New South Wales and was a Captain engineer in the RAN who developed patented mechanical devices to the drive advantage of Australian naval vessels, being awarded the OBE. His son Edwin Carr competed at the 1952 Helsinki Olympics as well as at the British Empire Games in Auckland New Zealand in 1950. Edwin jnr was a surgeon. He did a tour of duty with the Royal Australian Medical Corps in Vietnam in 1970.
