= José-María Larrabeiti =

Spanish sprinter

Personal information
- Nationality: Spanish
- Born: 20 October 1900 Santander, Spain

Sport
- Sport: Track and field
- Event(s): 100m, 200m

José-María Larrabeiti Eguidazu (born 20 October 1900, date of death unknown) was a Spanish sprinter. He competed in three events at the 1924 Summer Olympics.
