= George Dustan =

South African sprinter

Personal information
- Nationality: South African
- Born: 12 June 1900 Cape Town, Cape Colony
- Died: 27 July 1951 (aged 51) Polokwane, South Africa

Sport
- Sport: Track and field
- Event(s): 100m, 200m

George Dustan (12 June 1900 – 27 July 1951) was a South African sprinter. He competed in three events at the 1924 Summer Olympics.
