= Laurence Armstrong =

Canadian sprinter

Personal information
- Born: September 2, 1891 Sault Ste. Marie, Ontario, Canada
- Died: December 21, 1968 (aged 77) North Saanich, British Columbia, Canada

Sport
- Sport: Track and field
- Event(s): 100m, 200m

Laurence Armstrong (September 2, 1891 – December 21, 1968) was a Canadian sprinter. He competed in three events at the 1924 Summer Olympics.
