= Konstantinos Pantelidis =

Greek sprinter

Personal information
- Nationality: Greek
- Born: 1901 Cyprus

Sport
- Sport: Track and field
- Event(s): 100m, 200m, long jump

Konstantinos Pantelidis (born 1901, date of death unknown) was a Greek sprinter and long jumper. He competed in four events at the 1924 Summer Olympics.
