= Zygmunt Weiss =

Polish sprinter

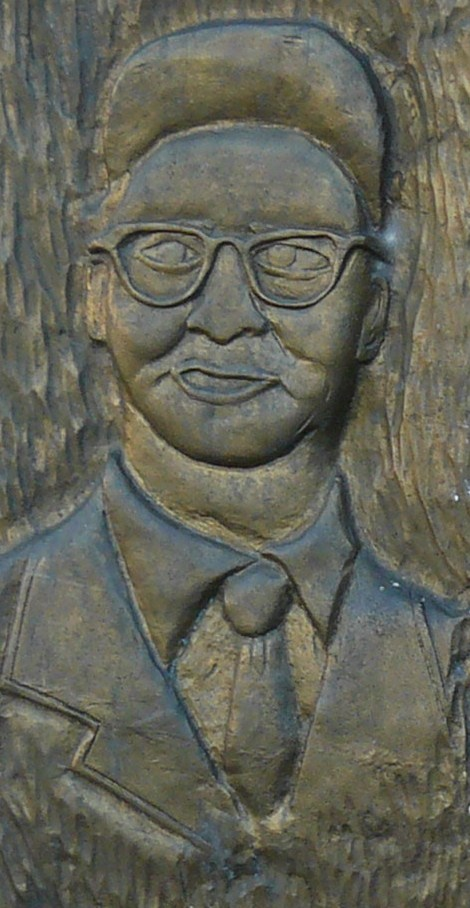
- Zygmunt Weiss plaque in Choszczno

Personal information
- Nationality: Polish
- Born: 4 April 1903 Warsaw, Congress Poland
- Died: 4 June 1977 (aged 74) Bad Ischl, Austria

Sport
- Sport: Track and field
- Event(s): 100m, 200m, 400m

Zygmunt Eugeniusz Weiss (4 April 1903 – 4 June 1977) was a Polish sprinter and sport journalist. He competed at the 1924 and 1928 Summer Olympics. During World War II, Weiss fought in the September Campaign after Poland was invaded by Nazi Germany.
