= Juan Junqueras =

Spanish sprinter (1900–1938)

Personal information
- Nationality: Spanish
- Born: 1900 Barcelona, Spain
- Died: 30 September 1938 (aged 37–38) Barcelona, Spain

Sport
- Sport: Track and field
- Event(s): 100m, 200m

Juan Junqueras i Baguñà (1900 – 30 September 1938) was a Spanish sprinter. He competed in three events at the 1924 Summer Olympics. He also competed in the hockey event at the 1928 Summer Olympics.
