= Deaths in October 1991 =

The following is a list of notable deaths in October 1991.

Entries for each day are listed alphabetically by surname. A typical entry lists information in the following sequence:

- Name, age, country of citizenship at birth, subsequent country of citizenship (if applicable), reason for notability, cause of death (if known), and reference.

== October 1991 ==
=== 1 ===
- Willie Borsch, 61, American drag racer.
- Jack Fidler, 86, Australian rules footballer.
- Keith Ranspot, 77, American football player.
- Victor Teterin, 68, Soviet artist.
- Stu Williamson, 58, American jazz musician.

=== 2 ===
- Hazen Argue, 70, Canadian politician.
- Maria Aurèlia Capmany, 73, Spanish novelist, playwright and essayist.
- Patriarch Demetrios I of Constantinople, 77, Turkish archbishop, heart attack.
- Hope Evans, 89, Australian rules footballer.
- Lloyd Kirkham Garrison, 93, American lawyer.
- Jim Handby, 88, Australian footballer and politician.
- Peter Heyworth, 70, American-British music critic and biographer, stroke.
- Mike McCarron, 69, American basketball player.
- Bo Westerberg, 77, Swedish Olympic sailor (1936).

=== 3 ===
- Max Cantor, 32, American journalist and actor (Dirty Dancing), heroin overdose.
- Ed Dancker, 77, American basketball player.
- Fazle Haq, 63, Pakistani general and politician, assassinated.
- Paule Herreman, 72, Belgian actress and television presenter.
- John Hood, 87, Australian diplomat.
- Gia Nadareishvili, 70, Soviet and Georgian chess player and author on chess studies.

=== 4 ===
- Heinrich Hellwege, 83, German politician.
- Josefina Valencia Muñoz, 78, Colombian politician.
- Laurie Taylor, 74, Australian rules footballer.
- John G. Williams Jr., 67, American admiral.
- J. Frank Wilson, 49, American singer, diabetes.

=== 5 ===
- Jørgen Beck, 76, Danish actor.
- Martin Ennals, 64, British human rights activist.
- Ramnath Goenka, 87, Indian newspaper publisher.
- Milan Milišić, 50, Yugoslav writer, shelling.
- Hope Portocarrero, 62, American-Nicaraguan socialite, First Lady of Nicaragua (1967–1972, 1974–1979), cancer.

=== 6 ===
- Alfred Bencini, 74, Maltese Olympic sprinter (1936).
- Elaine Burton, Baroness Burton of Coventry, 87, British politician.
- Roger Forsythe, 36, American fashion designer, AIDS.
- Alphonse Gallegos, 60, American Roman Catholic bishop, traffic accident.
- Virginia Giorgi, 77, Italian Olympic gymnast (1928).
- Michael Kinek, 74, American football player (Cleveland Rams).
- Mark Shevelev, 86, Soviet pilot during World War II and polar aviation pioneer.
- Igor Talkov, 34, Soviet singer, shot.

=== 7 ===
- Leo Durocher, 86, American baseball player and manager.
- Alan Fletcher, 84, Australian politician.
- Natalia Ginzburg, 75, Italian writer and politician, cancer.
- Lindsay McNamara, 73, Australian rules footballer.
- Darren Millane, 26, Australian rules football player, traffic collision.
- Jorge Ángel Livraga Rizzi, 61, Argentine writer and philosopher.
- Prentiss Taylor, 83, American illustrator, lithographer, and painter.

=== 8 ===
- Kevin Bond, 63, Australian rules footballer.
- Ed Hanyzewski, 71, American baseball player (Chicago Cubs).
- Arie Kaan, 89, Dutch Olympic hurdler (1928).
- Dick Moynihan, 89, American football player (Frankford Yellow Jackets).
- Edward Skórzewski, 61, Polish film director and screenwriter.
- Lyall Smith, 76, American sports writer and editor.
- Zoska Veras, 99, Belarusian writer and poet.
- Maria Zubreeva, 91, Soviet painter, watercolorist, and graphic artist.

=== 9 ===
- Roy Black, 48, German schlager singer and actor, heart failure.
- Sumiyuki Kotani, 88, Japanese martial artist and Olympian (1932).
- Dagmar Lange, 77, Swedish author of crime fiction.
- Camille Libar, 73, Luxembourgish football player and manager.
- Doris Lilly, 69, American newspaper columnist and writer, cancer.
- Charlie Moss, 80, American baseball player (Philadelphia Athletics).
- Tom Philpott, 49, American professor, suicide by gunshot.
- Thalmus Rasulala, 51, American actor (Blacula, One Life to Live, New Jack City), heart attack.

=== 10 ===
- Victor Christgau, 97, American politician.
- Leonard Cook, 78, Australian Olympic boxer (1936).
- Pío Cabanillas Gallas, 67, Spanish jurist and politician, heart attack.
- Nickolaus Hirschl, 85, Austrian wrestler and Olympic medalist (1932).
- Yaroslav Lesiv, 46, Ukrainian poet and priest, traffic collision.
- Bob Morgan, 61, American gridiron football player (Washington Redskins, Calgary Stampeders).
- Wiesława Noskiewicz, 80, Polish Olympic gymnast (1936).
- Gamble Rogers, 54, American musician, drowned.
- Andrzej Zaucha, 42, Polish rhythm & blues and pop-jazz singer, and actor, shot.

=== 11 ===
- Gene Barth, 61, American football player.
- Pietro Ferraris, 79, Italian football player.
- Ron Ferrier, 77, English footballer.
- Redd Foxx, 68, American actor (Sanford and Son, The Redd Foxx Show, Harlem Nights), heart attack.
- Luke Higgins, 70, American gridiron football player.
- Clay Kirby, 43, American baseball player (San Diego Padres, Cincinnati Reds, Montreal Expos), heart attack.
- Branislav Mihajlović, 54, Serbian football player.
- Martin Olofsson, 99, Swedish Olympic weightlifter (1920, 1924).
- Art Strobel, 68, Canadian-born American ice hockey player (New York Rangers).
- Lidiya Sukharevskaya, 82, Soviet stage actress and playwright.
- Carroll Williams, 74, American zoologist, lymphoma.

=== 12 ===
- Ian Ayre, 62, Australian tennis player.
- Walter Bach, 81, Swiss gymnast and Olympian (1936).
- Narciso Horacio Doval, 47, Argentine football player, heart attack.
- Sheila Florance, 75, Australian actress, lung cancer.
- Diana Gibson, 76, American film actress.
- Aline MacMahon, 92, American actress (Dragon Seed), pneumonia.
- Taso Mathieson, 83, British racing driver and author of automotive history books.
- Regis Toomey, 93, American actor (The Big Sleep, Guys and Dolls, Spellbound).
- Grigoris Vlastos, 84, Greek scholar of ancient philosophy.

=== 13 ===
- William Gentry, 92, New Zealand Military Forces general.
- Owen Guyatt, 70, Australian rules footballer.
- Donald Houston, 67, Welsh actor (Clash of the Titans, Where Eagles Dare, The Blue Lagoon), stroke.
- Sixten Johansson, 81, Swedish Olympic ski jumper (1936).
- János Kelen, 80, Hungarian Olympic long-distance runner (1936).
- Hugh Molson, Baron Molson, 88, British politician.
- Daniel Oduber Quirós, 70, Costa Rican politician, president (1974–1978).
- Agustín Rodríguez Sahagún, 59, Spanish politician and businessman.

=== 14 ===
- Thomas H. Eliot, 84, American lawyer, politician, and academic.
- Walter M. Elsasser, 87, German-American physicist.
- Al Goldstein, 55, American football player (Oakland Raiders).
- Richard Hittleman, 64, American yoga teacher and author.
- Jay Richard Kennedy, 80, American writer, screenwriter, composer, and record executive.
- David Neville, 83, Canadian ice hockey player and Olympian (1936).

=== 15 ===
- Antonio Canale, 76, Italian comic writer and artist.
- John Greenway, 71, American folklorist and folk singer.
- Verda James, 90, Canadian-American politician.
- Robert Pastene, 73, American actor.
- Han Ying-chieh, 64, Hong Kong actor, cancer.

=== 16 ===
- Arthur E. Arling, 85, American cameraman and cinematographer.
- Ole Beich, 36, Danish bassist (Guns N' Roses), drowned.
- Walter Buswell, 83, Canadian ice hockey player (Detroit Red Wings, Montreal Canadiens).
- Lore Fischer, 80, German singer.
- Giacomo Mari, 66, Italian football player and Olympian (1948).
- Boris Papandopulo, 85, Croatian composer.
- Juku Pent, 72, Estonian-born German Olympic cross-country skier (1952).
- Barry Wong, 44, Hong Kong screenwriter, film producer and actor, heart attack.
- Blago Zadro, 47, Croatian army officer, killed in action.

=== 17 ===
- John C. Bailar, Jr., 87, American chemist and academic.
- Herman Maxwell Batten, 82, Canadian politician, member of the House of Commons of Canada (1953-1968).
- J. G. Devlin, 84, Northern Irish actor.
- Tennessee Ernie Ford, 72, American singer ("Sixteen Tons", "The Shotgun Boogie"), liver failure.
- Władysław Giergiel, 74, Polish football player.
- Håkon Johnsen, 77, Norwegian politician.
- Harlan James Smith, 67, American astronomer.
- Piet van Est, 57, Dutch cyclist.

=== 18 ===
- Enrico Boniforti, 73, Italian football player.
- Ron Cooper, 80, Australian rules footballer.
- Stephen Dickson, 40, American baritone, complications from AIDS.
- Bronisław Gosztyła, 56, Polish ice hockey player and Olympian (1956, 1964).
- Judith Sulian, 71, Argentine film actress.
- Gunnar Sønstevold, 78, Norwegian composer.

=== 19 ===
- George Beaumont, 87, British Olympic rower (1928).
- Walter Gericke, 83, German Luftwaffe officer during World War II.
- Henry Holst, 92, Danish violinist.
- Gheorghe Pahonțu, 58, Romanian football player.
- Otakar Rademacher, 65, Czech Olympic boxer (1948).
- Howard Swearer, 59, American academic, cancer.
- Naum Vilenkin, 70, Soviet mathematician.

=== 20 ===
- Georges Beuchat, 81, French inventor, businessman, and underwater diving pioneer.
- Marcus Goodrich, 93, American screenwriter.
- Clifford Last, 72, English sculptor.
- Susan Noel, 79, English squash and tennis player.
- J. Graham Parsons, 83, American diplomat.
- Yehuda Tzadka, 81, Israeli rabbi and rosh yeshiva.

=== 21 ===
- Lorenc Antoni, 82, Kosovo Albanian composer, conductor, and ethnomusicologist.
- Louis Calabro, 64, Italian American orchestral composer.
- Lev Chegorovsky, 77, Soviet and Russian artist.
- Bobby Coombs, 83, American baseball player (Philadelphia Athletics, New York Giants).
- Jim Hamby, 94, American baseball player (New York Giants).

=== 22 ===
- Steven "Jesse" Bernstein, 40, American writer and performance artist, suicide by exsanguination.
- Robert Carlin, 90, Canadian politician.
- Joy Harington, 77, English television actress, writer, producer, and director.
- Hachiro Kasuga, 67, Japanese singer.
- Judy Kelly, 77, Australian-British actress.

=== 23 ===
- Derek Edge, 49, English football player.
- Job Stewart, 57, British stage and screen actor.
- Július Torma, 69, Slovak boxer and Olympic champion (1948, 1952, 1956).
- Alida van Leeuwen, 83, Dutch Olympic diver (1928).

=== 24 ===
- Ismat Chughtai, 76, Indian Urdu novelist, humanist and filmmaker.
- J. A. Milton Perera, 62, Sri Lankan singer and composer.
- Gene Roddenberry, 70, American television producer (Star Trek), cardiac arrest.
- Toivo Salminen, 67, Finnish Olympic field hockey player (1952).
- Vilko Ukmar, 86, Slovenian composer.
- Luisa Vehil, 78, Uruguayan theater and movie actress.

=== 25 ===
- Albert Baldauf, 73, German politician and member of the Bundestag.
- Joe Bokina, 81, American baseball player (Washington Senators).
- George Brunet, 56, American baseball player.
- Khigh Dhiegh, 81, American actor (Hawaii Five-O, The Manchurian Candidate, Seconds).
- Bill Graham, 60, German-American impresario, helicopter crash.
- Ray Harry, 82, Australian rules footballer.
- Ron Harvey, 55, Australian rules footballer.
- Israel Krupp, 83, Norwegian footballer.
- Louis le Grange, 63, Lawyer, a South African politician.
- Tamaz Namgalauri, 34, Georgian judoka and Olympian (1980).
- John Stratton, 65, British actor.
- Walter Stude, 77, American Olympic field hockey player (1948, 1956).

=== 26 ===
- Henry Wilson Allen, 79, American writer and screenwriter, pneumonia.
- Bill Bevens, 75, American baseball player (New York Yankees), lymphoma.
- Vivian Dandridge, 70, American singer, actress and dancer, stroke.
- Gladys Davis, 72, Canadian baseball player.
- Major Holley, 67, American jazz bassist.
- Ed Justice, 78, American gridiron football player (Boston/Washington Redskins).
- Gabe Patterson, 72, American baseball and Canadian football player.
- Jack Sanders, 74, American football player (Pittsburgh Steelers, Philadelphia Eagles).
- Enrique Sorrel, 79, Chilean football player and manager.
- Tahira Tahirova, 77, Soviet politician and diplomat.
- Osvaldo Wenzel, 80, Chilean Olympic decathlete (1936).

=== 27 ===
- George Barker, 78, English poet.
- Robert Gindre, 80, French Olympic cross country skier (1936).
- Rocky Hata, 43, Japanese professional wrestler, diabetes.
- Howard Kingsbury, 87, American Olympic rower (1924).
- Pyke Koch, 90, Dutch artist.
- Andrzej Panufnik, 77, Polish composer.

=== 28 ===
- Sylvia Fine, 78, American lyricist, composer, and producer, emphysema.
- Joseph Fletcher, 86, American professor.
- John Kobal, 51, Austrian film historian, pneumonia.
- Ilie Murgulescu, 89, Romanian physical chemist and a communist politician.
- Akram Ojjeh, 73, Syrian-Saudi businessman, diabetes.
- George Treweek, 86, Australian rugby player.
- Billy Wright, 59, American singer, pulmonary embolism.

=== 29 ===
- Cyril Black, 89, British politician.
- Lee Boltin, 73, American photographer, leukemia.
- Donald Churchill, 60, English actor and playwright, heart attack.
- Jimmie Coker, 55, American baseball player (Philadelphia Phillies, San Francisco Giants, Cincinnati Reds), heart attack.
- John DeCuir, Sr., 73, American art director and production designer (The King and I, Cleopatra, Hello, Dolly!), Oscar winner (1957, 1964, 1970).
- Hikmat Muradov, 22, Azerbaijani soldier, killed in battle.
- Nigel Poett, 84, British Army officer.
- Mario Scelba, 90, Italian politician, Prime Minister (1954–1955), thrombosis.
- Jean Schmit, 76, Luxembourgian footballer.
- Johan Støa, 91, Norwegian multi-sportsman and Olympian (1928 Winter, 1928 Summer).
- Carl Tomasello, 74, American football player (New York Giants).

=== 30 ===
- Aniela Jaffé, 88, German-Swiss psychoanalysts.
- Ellis Kolchin, 75, American mathematician and academic, pancreatic cancer.
- George Lambert, 72, English cricket player.
- Prince Emich, 7th Prince of Leiningen, 65, German noble and entrepreneur.
- Karl Freiherr Michel von Tüßling, 84, Nazi German Schutzstaffel (SS) officer and politician.
- Richard Savignac, 86, French Olympic boxer (1924).

=== 31 ===
- Gene Anderson, 52, American professional wrestler, heart attack.
- Ewald Bucher, 77, German politician.
- Garvin Bushell, 89, American musician and multi-instrumentalist.
- Charles K.L. Davis, 66, American opera singer and musician.
- John M. Dooley, 94, American football player.
- Alexander Frick, 81, Liechtenstein politician, Prime Minister (1945–1962).
- Simon Gjoni, 66, Albanian conductor, and composer.
- Frederick Hartt, 77, Italian Renaissance scholar and author.
- Dick Joy, 75, American radio and television announcer.
- Agnes Katharina Maxsein, 86, German politician and member of the Bundestag.
- Joseph Papp, 70, American theatrical producer, prostate cancer.
- Dixie Parsons, 75, American baseball player (Detroit Tigers).
