= Leighton Dye =

American hurdler

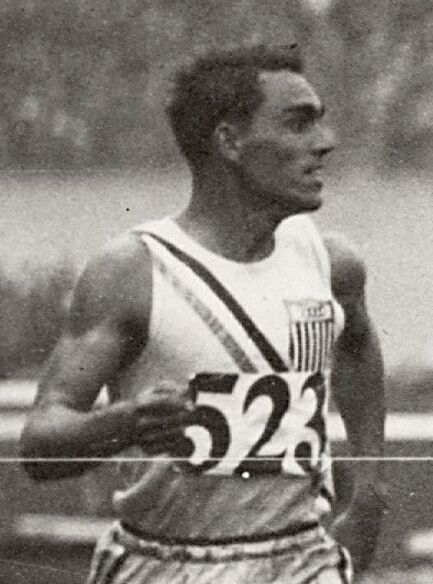

Personal information
- Born: October 30, 1901 St. Louis, Missouri, US
- Died: 25 October 1977 (aged 75) Naples, Florida, US
- Height: 1.93 m (6 ft 4 in)
- Weight: 82 kg (181 lb; 12.9 st)

Sport
- Sport: Athletics
- Event: 110 metres hurdles
- Club: Los Angeles Athletics Team

Achievements and titles
- Personal best: 110 m hurdles: 14.6 (1928)

Leighton William Charles Dye (October 30, 1901 – October 25, 1977) was an American hurdler. He placed fourth in the 110 m hurdles at the 1928 Summer Olympics and was United States champion in 1926.

== Biography ==
Dye was born in St. Louis, Missouri on October 30, 1901. Representing coach Dean Cromwell's USC Trojans, Dye won the IC4A 120 yd (109.7 m) hurdles title as a junior in 1925, running 14.8; USC won that year's IC4A team title. Later that year he placed third at the national championships, behind Olympic finalist George Guthrie and NCAA champion Hugo Leistner. In 1926 Dye repeated as IC4A champion, this time in 14.7, and placed second to Guthrie at the NCAA championships; the Trojans again won the IC4A team title, and would have also won the NCAA title if one had been awarded that year. Dye then won at the national championships in 14.6, equalling both his personal best and Guthrie's meeting record from the previous year.

Dye again ran 14.6, this time for the metric 110 m hurdles, at the 1928 Southwestern Olympic Tryouts, qualifying for the final Olympic Trials; the time broke Earl Thomson's world record for the metric distance of 14.8, although it was still inferior to Thomson's 14.4 for the imperial hurdles and was never ratified as a world record. At the final Trials in Cambridge Dye placed third behind Steve Anderson and John Collier, qualifying for the Olympics.

At the Olympics in Amsterdam Dye won his heat in 15.0 and then his semi-final in 14.8, a time that equalled both the Olympic record and Thomson's still-official metric world record; however, South Africa's George Weightman-Smith ran 14.6 in a subsequent semi-final. In the final Dye placed fourth behind Sid Atkinson, Anderson and Collier, but defeated Weightman-Smith.

Dye later became a sales executive for the Goodyear Tire & Rubber Company. He died in Naples, Florida on October 25, 1977.
