= Dooley =

Dooley is an Irish surname. It is derived from the Gaelic Ó Dubhlaoich meaning 'descendant of Dubhlaoch', a given name composed of the elements dubh 'Black, pale' and laoch 'warrior, Champion. Champions later called Knights .

== Notable people ==
=== Arts, entertainment and media ===
- Arthur Dooley (17 January 1929 – 7 January 1994) was an English Marxist, artist, and sculptor.[1][2]
- Brian Dooley (writer) (born 1971), British television writer
- Dooley Wilson (1886–1953), actor and star of Casablanca
- Eliza B. K. Dooley (1880–1958), American artist, writer, government official in Puerto Rico
- James Dooley (composer) (born 1976), American film score composer
- Jason Dooley (born 1971), American drummer
- Kevin Dooley (born 1953), comics editor
- Mark Dooley, Irish philosopher and writer
- Mike Dooley, New Zealand musician
- Paul Dooley, American actor
- Ray Dooley (actor) (born 1952), American film and television actor
- Ray Dooley (actress) (1896–1984), American vaudeville comedian
- Shaun Dooley, British actor
- Stacey Dooley, British TV journalist
- Taylor Dooley, American actress
- Thomas E. Dooley, American media executive
- Tom Dooley (editor) (born 1970), American magazine editor
- Tyler Dooley, American reality television contestant and nephew of Meghan, Duchess of Sussex

=== Politics ===
- Brian J. Dooley (born 1963), Irish human rights activist
- Cal Dooley (born 1954), American politician from California
- Charlie Dooley (fl. 1960s–2010s), American politician from Missouri
- Edwin B. Dooley (1905–1982), American politician from New York
- James Dooley (New South Wales politician) (1877–1950), Australian politician from New South Wales
- James H. Dooley (1841–1922), American lawyer and politician from Virginia
- Kerri-Anne Dooley, Australian politician from Queensland
- John Dooley (politician) (1883–1961), Australian politician from New South Wales
- Pat Dooley (born 1946), American politician from Georgia
- Shawn Dooley (fl. 2010s–2020s), American politician from Massachusetts
- Timmy Dooley (born 1969), Irish politician
- Tom Dooley (Nebraska politician) (1880–1958), American politician from Nebraska

=== Religion ===
- John Jarlath Dooley (1906–1997), Irish Catholic prelate
- Michael Dooley, Seventh Catholic Bishop of Dunedin (2018–present)
- Thomas P. Dooley, Judeo-Christian author, biomedical scientist, inventor

=== Sport ===
- Bill Dooley (1934–2016), American football coach and brother of Vince Dooley
- Billy Dooley (born 1969), Irish hurler
- Derek Dooley (footballer) (1929–2008), British football player and manager
- Derek Dooley (American football) (born 1968), college football coach; son of Vince Dooley and nephew of Bill Dooley
- Jim Dooley (1930–2008), American football player and manager
- John Dooley (American football), American football coach
- John Mike Dooley, Irish hurler
- John M. Dooley (1897–1991), American football player
- Thomas Dooley (born 1961), retired German-American footballer
- Tom Dooley (American football) (1934–2018), American football official
- Tom Dooley (racewalker) (born 1945), American race walker at the 1968 and 1972 Olympics
- Tom Dooley (footballer) (1914–1975), English footballer
- Vince Dooley (1932–2022), American football coach, and brother of Bill Dooley and father of Derek Dooley
- Wade Dooley, British rugby player

=== Other fields ===
- Jackie M. Dooley (fl. 1990s–2010s), American archivist
- Kevin J. Dooley (born 1961), American scholar, professor of supply chain management
- John Dooley (judge) (born 1944), justice of the Vermont Supreme Court
- Norval Dooley, Australian Army officer and solicitor
- Thomas Anthony Dooley III (1927–1961), American humanitarian who worked in Laos and Vietnam
- Vol Dooley (1927-2014), Louisiana sheriff

== Fictional people ==
- Mr. Dooley, folksy Irish bartender in stories by Finley Peter Dunne
- Dooley, the titular full-bodied children’s entertainer and character in the PBS Kids series; The Dooley and Pals Show.

== Other uses ==
- "Big Dooley", nickname for the Chevrolet C/K (third generation) dual-wheel pickup truck
- Dooley, Virginia, United States, an unincorporated community
- Dooley, Montana, United States, a ghost town

== See also ==
- Dooly (disambiguation)
