= Athletics at the 1924 Summer Olympics – Men's 110 metres hurdles =

Men's 110 metres hurdles at the Games of the VIII Olympiad
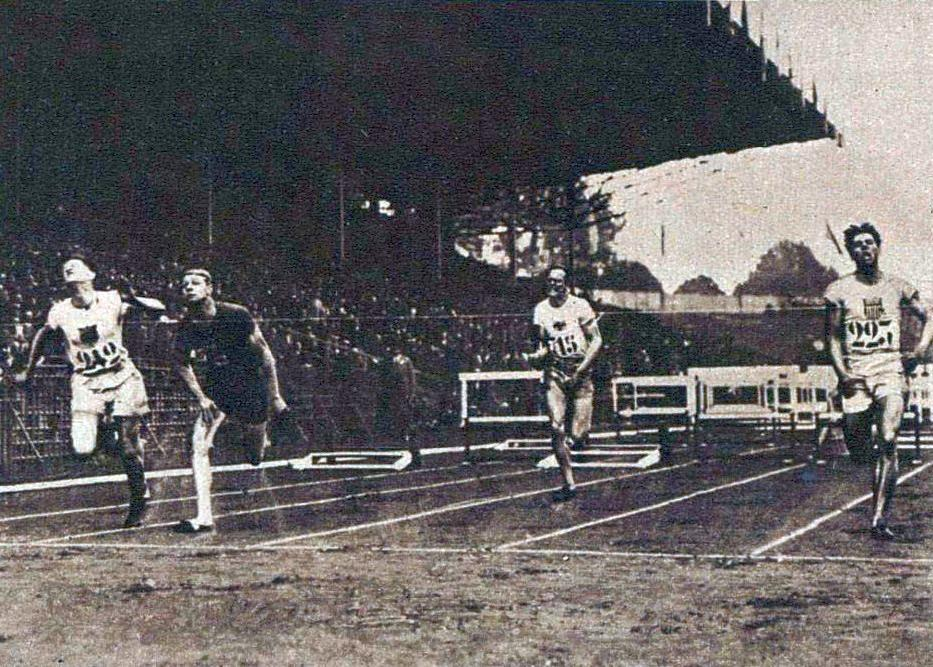
- The finish of the 110 metres hurdles final
- Venue: Stade Olympique Yves-du-Manoir
- Dates: July 8, 1924 (quarterfinals and semifinals); July 9, 1924 (final)
- Competitors: 31 from 17 nations
- Winning time: 15.0

Medalists
1st place, gold medalist(s)		Daniel Kinsey; United States
2nd place, silver medalist(s)		Sydney Atkinson; South Africa
3rd place, bronze medalist(s)		Sten Pettersson; Sweden

The men's 110 metres hurdles event was part of the track and field athletics programme at the 1924 Summer Olympics. The competition was held on Tuesday, July 8, 1924, and on Wednesday, July 9, 1924. Thirty-one hurdlers from 17 nations competed. The maximum number of athletes per nation was 4. The event was won by Daniel Kinsey of the United States, the nation's sixth victory in the seven times the event had been held. South Africa and Sweden each won their first 110 metres hurdles medals with Sydney Atkinson's silver and Sten Pettersson's bronze, respectively.

== Background ==
This was the seventh appearance of the event, which is one of 12 athletics events to have been held at every Summer Olympics. Carl-Axel Christiernsson of Sweden, who had finished sixth in 1920, was the only finalist to return in 1924.

Argentina, Brazil, and Mexico each made their first appearance in the event. The United States made its seventh appearance, the only nation to have competed in the 110 metres hurdles in each Games to that point.

== Competition format ==
The competition used the three-round basic format introduced in 1908. The first round consisted of eight heats, with anywhere between 1 and 6 hurdlers each. The top two hurdlers in each heat advanced to the semifinals (with the exception of heat 7, which had only one hurdler). The 15 semifinalists were divided into three semifinals of 5 hurdlers each; the top two hurdlers in each advanced to the 6-man final.

== Records ==
These were the standing world and Olympic records (in seconds) prior to the 1924 Summer Olympics.

World record	Earl Thomson (CAN)	14.8	Antwerp, Belgium	18 August 1920
Olympic record	Earl Thomson (CAN)	14.8	Antwerp, Belgium	18 August 1920

No new world or Olympic records were set during the competition.

== Schedule ==
Date	Time	Round
Tuesday, 8 July 1924	14:00; 15:45	Round 1 Semifinals
Wednesday, 9 July 1924	14:30	Final

== Results ==
=== Round 1 ===
All heats were held on Tuesday, July 8, 1924.

The best two finishers of every heat qualified for the semi-finals. Heat seven saw a walkover as only one competitor qualified for the next round.

==== Heat 1 ====
Rank	Athlete	Nation	Time	Notes
1	George Guthrie	United States	15.8	Q
2	Otakar Jandera	Czechoslovakia	16.0	Q
3	Leopold Partridge	Great Britain	Unknown	
4	Lau Spel	Netherlands	Unknown	
5	Tibor Püspöki	Hungary	Unknown	
6	Alberto Byington	Brazil	Unknown	

==== Heat 2 ====
Newberry was disqualified for three false starts.

Rank	Athlete	Nation	Time	Notes
1	Sten Pettersson	Sweden	15.6	Q
2	Eric Harrison	Great Britain	Unknown	Q
3	Alfredo Ugarte	Chile	Unknown	
—	Guillermo Newberry	Argentina	DSQ	

==== Heat 3 ====
Rank	Athlete	Nation	Time	Notes
1	Fred Gaby	Great Britain	15.6	Q
2	Oscar van Rappard	Netherlands	Unknown	Q
3	Victor Moriaud	Switzerland	Unknown	
4	Warren Montabone	Canada	Unknown	

==== Heat 4 ====
Rank	Athlete	Nation	Time	Notes
1	Henri Thorsen	Denmark	16.0	Q
2	Willi Moser	Switzerland		Q
—	Henri Bernard	France	DNF	

==== Heat 5 ====
Rank	Athlete	Nation	Time	Notes
1	Daniel Kinsey	United States	15.4	Q
2	Gabriel Sempé	France	15.6	Q
3	Sydney Pierce	Canada	16.2	
4	Ioannis Talianos	Greece	16.3	
5	Cheruvari Lakshmanan	India	16.4	

==== Heat 6 ====
Rank	Athlete	Nation	Time	Notes
1	Carl-Axel Christiernsson	Sweden	15.6	Q
2	Gilbert Allart	France	16.2	Q
3	Louis Lundgren	Denmark	Unknown	

==== Heat 7 ====
Johnson had a walkover.

Rank	Athlete	Nation	Time	Notes
1	Pitch Johnson	United States	16.6	Q

==== Heat 8 ====
Rank	Athlete	Nation	Time	Notes
1	Sydney Atkinson	South Africa	15.2	Q
2	Karl Anderson	United States	15.4	Q
3	David Burghley	Great Britain	Unknown	
4	László Muskát	Hungary	Unknown	
5	Francisco Contreras	Mexico	Unknown	

=== Semifinals ===
All semi-finals were held on Tuesday, July 8, 1924.

The best two finishers of every heat qualified for the final.

==== Semifinal 1 ====
Rank	Athlete	Nation	Time	Notes
1	Daniel Kinsey	United States	15.4	Q
2	Sten Pettersson	Sweden	15.6	Q
3	Pitch Johnson	United States	15.8	
4	Oscar van Rappard	Netherlands	Unknown	
5	Gilbert Allart	France	16.2	

==== Semifinal 2 ====
Rank	Athlete	Nation	Time	Notes
1	Carl-Axel Christiernsson	Sweden	15.4	Q
2	Karl Anderson	United States	15.4	Q
3	Fred Gaby	Great Britain	15.7	
4	Otakar Jandera	Czechoslovakia	Unknown	
5	Willi Moser	Switzerland	16.1	

==== Semifinal 3 ====
Rank	Athlete	Nation	Time	Notes
1	George Guthrie	United States	15.2	Q
2	Sydney Atkinson	South Africa	15.2	Q
3	Gabriel Sempé	France	15.3	
4	Eric Harrison	Great Britain	15.7	
5	Henri Thorsen	Denmark	15.7	

=== Final ===
The final was held on Wednesday, July 9, 1924. George Guthrie finished third, but was disqualified for knocking over three hurdles, which was not in accordance with the rules in force at that time.

Rank	Athlete	Nation	Time
1	Daniel Kinsey	United States	15.0
2	Sydney Atkinson	South Africa	15.0
3	Sten Pettersson	Sweden	15.4
4	Carl-Axel Christiernsson	Sweden	15.5
5	Karl Anderson	United States	Unknown
—	George Guthrie	United States	DSQ
