= Dooler =

Dooler is a surname. Notable people with the surname include:

- Carl Dooler (1943–2010), English rugby league footballer
- Steve Dooler, English rugby league footballer

== See also ==
- Dooher
- Dooley
