= Robert Marchand =

Robert Marchand may refer to:

- Robert Marchand (athlete) (1904–1982), French Olympic hurdler
- Robert Marchand (cyclist) (1911–2021), French cyclist
- Robert Marchand (director), Australian film director
