= Brian Dooley =

Brian Dooley may refer to:

- Brian Dooley (writer) (born 1971), English television writer
- Brian J. Dooley (born 1963), Irish human rights activist and author
