= Sid Atkinson =

South African athlete (1901–1977)

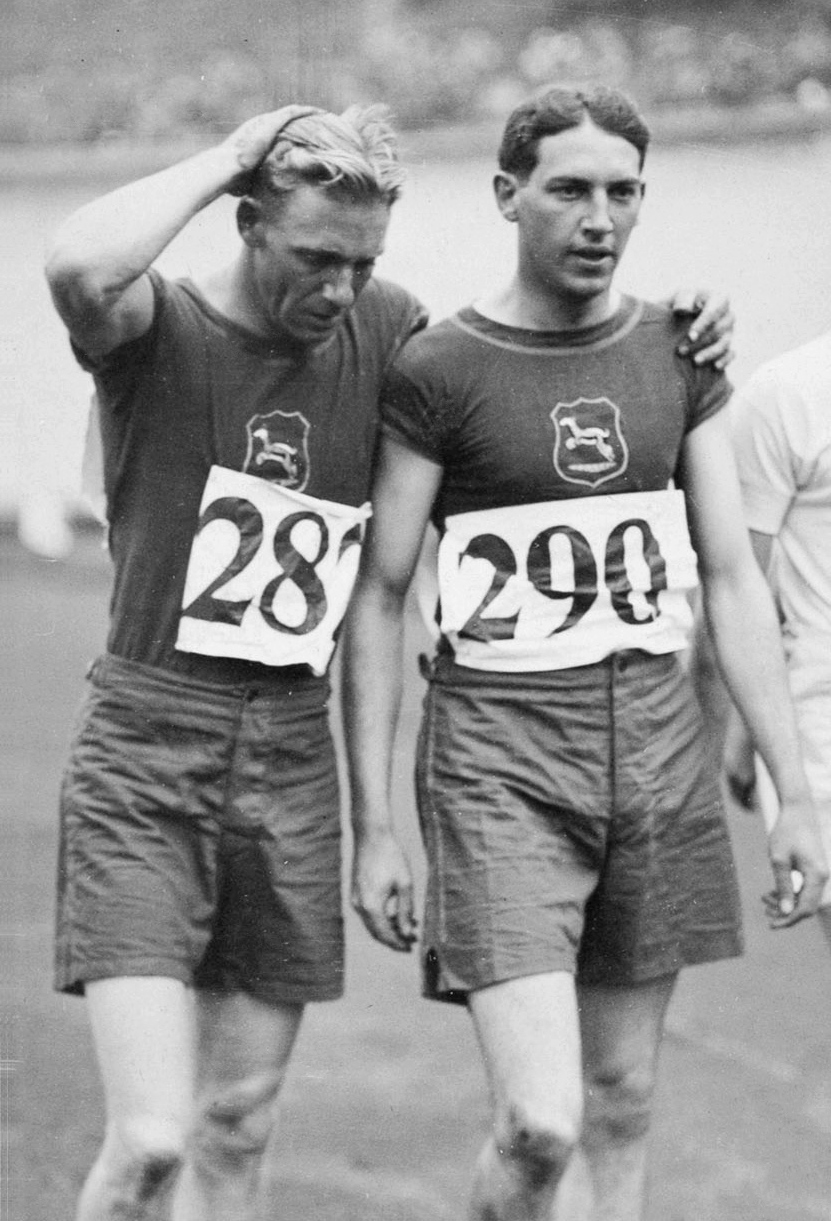
- Atkinson (left) with teammate George Weightman-Smith at the 1928 Olympics

Personal information
- Born: 14 March 1901 Durban, Colony of Natal
- Died: 31 August 1977 (aged 76) Durban, South Africa
- Height: 186 cm (6 ft 1 in)
- Weight: 76 kg (168 lb)

Sport
- Sport: Athletics
- Events: 110 m, 400 m hurdles, long jump

Achievements and titles
- Personal bests: 110 mH – 14.7y (1928); 400 mH - 56.5 (1922); LJ – 7.34 m (1925)
Medal record
Representing South Africa
Olympic Games
Silver medal – second place	1924 Paris	110 m hurdles
Gold medal – first place	1928 Amsterdam	110 m hurdles

Sidney James Montford Atkinson (14 March 1901 – 31 August 1977) was a South African athlete, winner of 110 m hurdles at the 1928 Summer Olympics.

== Career ==
Atkinson came onto the international athletics scene in 1922, when he ran the 110 m hurdles in 15.2 and the 400 m hurdles in 56.5. He was also a notable long jumper.

Atkinson won the British AAA Championships title in the 120 yards hurdles event at the 1924 AAA Championships.

At the 1924 Summer Olympics, the favourite for the 110 m hurdles was American George Guthrie, but as the race started, Atkinson and another American Daniel Kinsey got off to a quick start and ran nearly together until the eighth flight when Atkinson edged ahead. Atkinson clipped his toe on the last barrier, giving Kinsey enough of lead to break the tape and win the gold. Guthrie crashed through the barriers behind the two medalists and was disqualified.

Atkinson won the British AAA Championships title in the 120 Yards hurdles event at the 1928 AAA Championships. Shortly afterwards he represented South Africa at the 1928 Olympic Games in Amsterdam, Netherlands, where he finally gained gold after the disappointment of 1924, beating the world record holder Steve Anderson from the United States into second place.
