= John Dooley =

John or Johnny Dooley may refer to:

- John Dooley (politician) (1883–1961), Australian politician
- John Dooley (judge) (born 1944), justice of the Vermont Supreme Court
- John Dooley (American football), American football coach
- John Jarlath Dooley (1906–1997), Irish Catholic prelate
- John Mike Dooley, Irish hurler
- John M. Dooley (1897–1991), American football player
- Johnny Dooley (hurler), Irish hurling manager and player
- Johnny Dooley (rugby union), Irish international rugby union player

== See also ==
- John Dooly (1740–1780), American Revolutionary war hero
