= José Costa =

José Costa may refer to:

- José Costa (footballer, born 1953), Portuguese winger and manager
- José Costa (footballer, born 1994), Portuguese goalkeeper
- José Costa (sailor) (born 1984), Portuguese sailor
- José Horácio Costa, president of the Brazilian state of Espírito Santo
- José Palhares Costa (1908–1976) Portuguese hurdler
- José Ramos Costa (1926–1989), president of Valencia CF
- José da Costa (volleyball) (born 1941), Brazilian volleyball player
- José da Costa (footballer) (born 1928), Portuguese footballer
- José Xavier Costa (born 1980), Brazilian footballer
- José Costa (basketball)
- José Costa (athlete)
- José Costa (judge)
