= Jean Schmit =

Jean Schmit may refer to:

- Jean Schmit (cyclist) (1931–2010), Luxembourgish cyclist
- Jean Schmit (footballer) (1915–1991), Luxembourgish footballer

== See also ==
- Jean Schmidt (born 1951), American politician
