= Athletics at the 1928 Summer Olympics – Men's 110 metres hurdles =

Men's 110 metres hurdles at the Games of the IX Olympiad
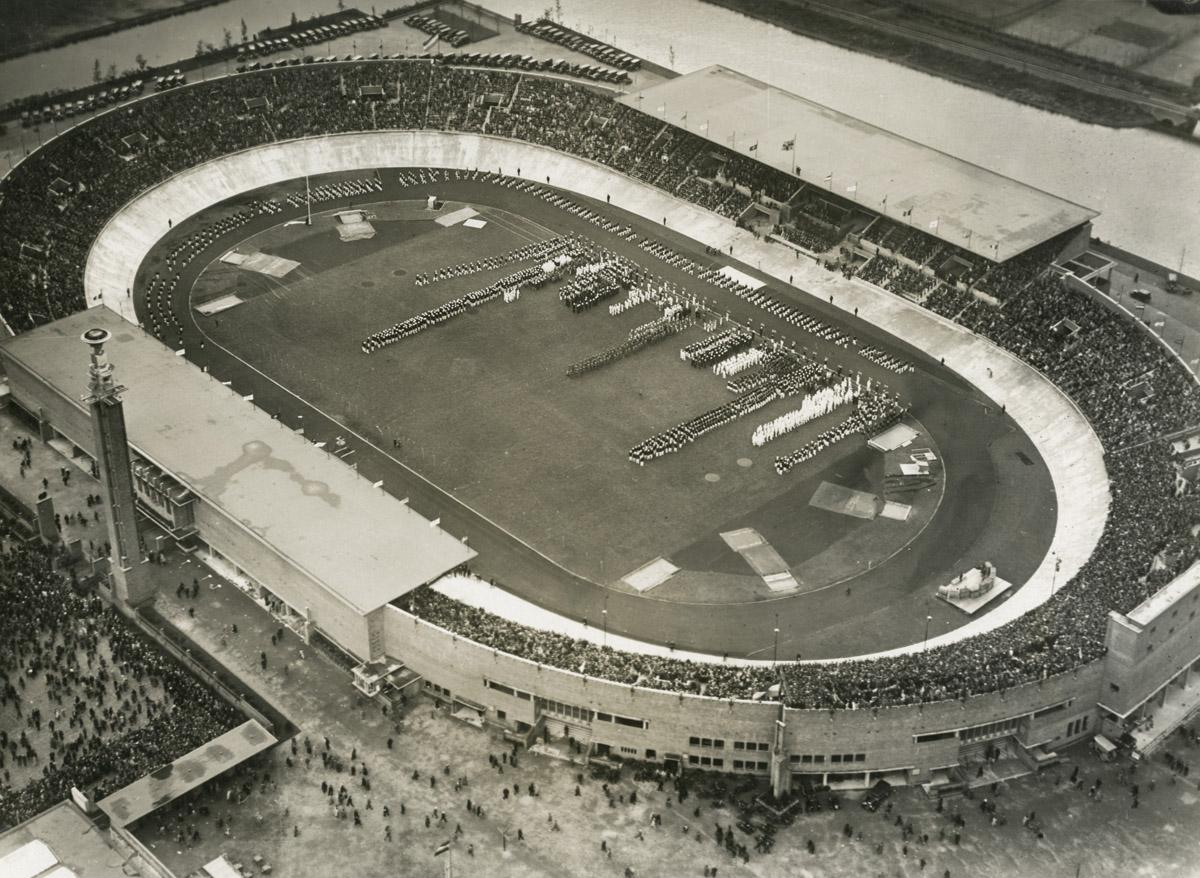
- Olympic Stadium in Amsterdam
- Venue: Olympic Stadium
- Dates: July 31, 1928 (heats & semifinals); August 1, 1928 (final)
- Competitors: 41 from 24 nations
- Winning time: 14.8

Medalists
1st place, gold medalist(s)		Sydney Atkinson	South Africa
2nd place, silver medalist(s)		Steve Anderson	United States
3rd place, bronze medalist(s)		John Collier	United States

Official Video

The men's 110 metres hurdles event at the 1928 Olympic Games took place between July 31 & August 1. Forty-one athletes from 24 nations competed. The maximum number of athletes per nation was 4. The event was won by Sydney Atkinson of South Africa, the nation's first title in the 110 metres hurdles; Atkinson became the first man to win two medals in the event (he had taken silver in 1924). It was only the second time the United States had not won the event; as in 1920, the Americans took silver and bronze.

== Background ==
This was the eighth appearance of the event, which is one of 12 athletics events to have been held at every Summer Olympics. Two finalists from 1924 returned: silver medalist Sydney Atkinson of South Africa and bronze medalist Sten Pettersson of Sweden. Atkinson and the American hurdlers were favored.

Austria, Ireland, Japan, Poland, Portugal, and Romania each made their first appearance in the event. The United States made its eighth appearance, the only nation to have competed in the 110 metres hurdles in each Games to that point.

== Competition format ==
The competition used the three-round basic format introduced in 1908. The first round consisted of nine heats, with between 4 and 6 hurdlers each. The top two hurdlers in each heat advanced to the semifinals. The 18 semifinalists were divided into three semifinals of 6 hurdlers each; the top two hurdlers in each advanced to the 6-man final.

== Records ==
These were the standing world and Olympic records (in seconds) prior to the 1928 Summer Olympics.

World record	Earl Thomson (CAN)	14.8	Antwerp, Belgium	18 August 1920
Olympic record	Earl Thomson (CAN)	14.8	Antwerp, Belgium	18 August 1920

George Weightman-Smith set a new world record at 14.6 seconds in the semifinals; that time was not beaten in the final.

== Schedule ==
Date	Time	Round
Tuesday, 31 July 1928	14:00; 16:50	Round 1 Semifinals
Wednesday, 1 August 1928	15:00	Final

== Results ==
=== Round 1 ===
The first two finishers in each heat moved on to the semifinal round.

==== Heat 1 ====
Rank	Athlete	Nation	Time	Notes
1	Gabriel Sempé	France	15.0	Q
2	Otakar Jandera	Czechoslovakia	Unknown	Q
3	Armand Lepaffe	Belgium	Unknown	
4	Lothar Albrich	Romania	Unknown	
—	Valerio Vallania	Argentina	DSQ	

==== Heat 2 ====
Rank	Athlete	Nation	Time	Notes
1	Carl Ring	United States	15.0	Q
2	Johannes Viljoen	South Africa	Unknown	Q
3	Ludwig Wessely	Austria	Unknown	
4	Arie Kaan	Netherlands	Unknown	
5	Otto Schöpp	Romania	Unknown	

==== Heat 3 ====
Rank	Athlete	Nation	Time	Notes
1	George Weightman-Smith	South Africa	14.8	Q
2	Robert Marchand	France	Unknown	Q
3	Albert Andersson	Sweden	Unknown	
4	Wilfrid Kalaugher	New Zealand	Unknown	

==== Heat 4 ====
Rank	Athlete	Nation	Time	Notes
1	Steve Anderson	United States	15.0	Q
2	Eric Wennström	Sweden	Unknown	Q
3	Alister Clark	Ireland	Unknown	
4	Douglas Neame	Great Britain	Unknown	

==== Heat 5 ====
Rank	Athlete	Nation	Time	Notes
1	Leighton Dye	United States	15.0	Q
2	Sid Atkinson	South Africa	Unknown	Q
3	Erik Kjellström	Sweden	Unknown	
4	Arie van Leeuwen	Netherlands	Unknown	

==== Heat 6 ====
Rank	Athlete	Nation	Time	Notes
1	Bernard Lucas	Great Britain	15.2	Q
2	Hans Steinhardt	Germany	Unknown	Q
3	Alfredo Ugarte	Chile	Unknown	
4	René Joannes-Powell	Belgium	Unknown	

==== Heat 7 ====
Rank	Athlete	Nation	Time	Notes
1	John Collier	United States	15.0	Q
2	Bengt Sjöstedt	Finland	15.0	Q
3	Giacomo Carlini	Italy	15.9	
4	Jan Britstra	Netherlands	Unknown	

==== Heat 8 ====
Rank	Athlete	Nation	Time	Notes
1	Fred Gaby	Great Britain	15.2	Q
2	Sten Pettersson	Sweden	Unknown	Q
3	Alf Watson	Australia	Unknown	
4	Evangelos Moiropoulos	Greece	15.6	
5	Louis Lundgren	Denmark	15.7	
6	Wojciech Trojanowski	Poland	16.0	

==== Heat 9 ====
Rank	Athlete	Nation	Time	Notes
1	Yoshio Miki	Japan	15.4	Q
2	David, Lord Burghley	Great Britain	Unknown	Q
3	Lau Spel	Netherlands	Unknown	
4	S. Abdul Hamid	India	Unknown	
5	José Palhares Costa	Portugal	Unknown	

=== Semifinals ===
The first two finishers in each race moved on to the final.

==== Semifinal 1 ====
Rank	Athlete	Nation	Time	Notes
1	Leighton Dye	United States	14.8	Q
2	Fred Gaby	Great Britain	14.9	Q
3	Eric Wennström	Sweden	14.9	
4	Hans Steinhardt	Germany	15.3	
5	Johannes Viljoen	South Africa	15.4	
6	Yoshio Miki	Japan	Unknown	

==== Semifinal 2 ====
Rank	Athlete	Nation	Time	Notes
1	Steve Anderson	United States	14.8	Q
2	Sid Atkinson	South Africa	14.9	Q
3	David, Lord Burghley	Great Britain	15.0	
4	Bengt Sjöstedt	Finland	15.1	
5	Robert Marchand	France	Unknown	
6	Otakar Jandera	Czechoslovakia	Unknown	

==== Semifinal 3 ====
Rank	Athlete	Nation	Time	Notes
1	George Weightman-Smith	South Africa	14.6	Q, WR
2	John Collier	United States	14.8	Q
3	Sten Pettersson	Sweden	15.0	
4	Carl Ring	United States	Unknown	
5	Gabriel Sempé	France	Unknown	
6	Bernard Lucas	Great Britain	Unknown	

=== Final ===
Rank	Athlete	Nation	Time
1st place, gold medalist(s)	Sydney Atkinson	South Africa	14.8
2nd place, silver medalist(s)	Steve Anderson	United States	14.8
3rd place, bronze medalist(s)	John Collier	United States	14.9
4	Leighton Dye	United States	14.9
5	George Weightman-Smith	South Africa	15.0
6	Fred Gaby	Great Britain	15.2
