= Dooly =

Dooly may refer to:

- Dooly (character), the main character from Dooly the Baby Dinosaur
- Dooly (vehicle), a form of litter or sedan chair originating in south and south-east Asia
- Dooly Building, Salt Lake City, Utah, United States
- Dooly County, Georgia, United States
  - Dooly Southern Railway, a defunct railway in Dooly County
- John Dooly (1740-1780), American soldier

== See also ==
- Dooley (disambiguation)
