= Tibor Püspöki =

Hungarian hurdler

Personal information
- Nationality: Hungarian
- Born: 1 June 1900 Budapest, Hungary
- Died: 21 January 1978 (aged 77) Budapest, Hungary

Sport
- Sport: Track and field
- Event: 110 metres hurdles
- Club: MAC, Budapest

Tibor Püspöki (1 June 1900 – 21 January 1978) was a Hungarian hurdler who competed at the 1924 Summer Olympics.

== Career ==
Püspöki competed in the men's 110 metres hurdles at the 1924 Olympic Games.

Püspöki finished second behind Richard Honner in the long jump event at the 1926 AAA Championships.
