= Carl Ring =

American hurdler

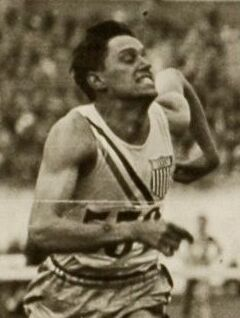

Personal information
- Full name: Carl E. Ring
- Born: May 17, 1902 Bangor, Maine, United States
- Died: June 11, 1991 (aged 89)

Sport
- Sport: Track and field
- Event: 110 metres hurdles

Carl E. Ring (May 17, 1902 – June 11, 1991) was an American hurdler. He competed in the men's 110 metres hurdles at the 1928 Summer Olympics.
