= Albert Andersson (athlete) =

Swedish athlete

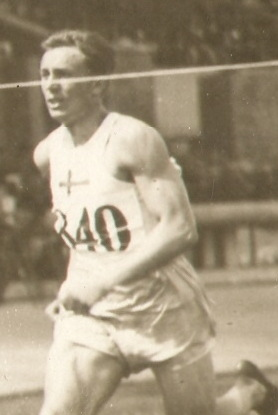
- Andersson in 1928

Personal information
- Full name: Albert Per Andersson
- Born: 25 April 1902 Sällshög, United Kingdoms of Sweden and Norway
- Died: 5 March 1977 (aged 74) Kristianstad, Sweden

Gymnastics career
- Discipline: Men's artistic gymnastics
- Country represented: Sweden
- Club: Stockholms Gymnastikförening; Fredrikshofs Idrottsförening
Medal record
Men's artistic gymnastics
Representing Sweden
Olympic Games
Gold medal – first place	1920 Antwerp	Team, Swedish system

Albert Per Andersson (25 April 1902 – 5 March 1977) was a Swedish gymnastics who competed in the 1920 Summer Olympics.

He was part of the Swedish team, which was able to win the gold medal in the gymnastics men's team, Swedish system event in 1920. He also competed in the men's 110 metres hurdles at the 1928 Summer Olympics.
