= Bernard Lucas =

British hurdler

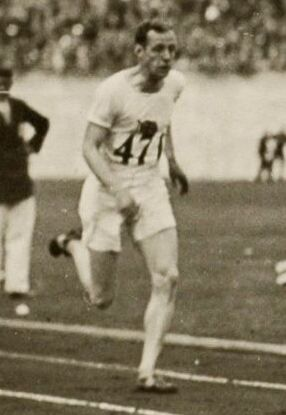

Personal information
- Nationality: British
- Born: 17 August 1907
- Died: 10 February 1994 (aged 86)

Sport
- Sport: Track and field
- Event: 110 metres hurdles

Bernard Lucas (17 August 1907 – 10 February 1994) was a British hurdler. He competed in the men's 110 metres hurdles at the 1928 Summer Olympics.
