= Eric Harrison (British Army officer) =

British Army officer

Major-General Eric Harrison CB CBE MC
- Born: 23 March 1893; Belgaum, India
- Died: 20 December 1987 (aged 94); Amesbury, Wiltshire, England
- Military career
- Allegiance: United Kingdom
- Branch: British Army
- Service years: 1913–1946
- Rank: Major-General
- Nickname: "Drednought"
- Service number: 27115
- Units: Royal Garrison Artillery; Royal Artillery
- Commands: Surrey and Sussex District
- Conflicts: First World War; Arab revolt in Palestine; Second World War
- Awards: Companion of the Order of the Bath; Commander of the Order of the British Empire; Military Cross; Mentioned in Despatches (4)
- Other work: Author, painter, justice of the peace, hospital chairman

Major-General Eric George William Warde Harrison, CB, CBE, MC (23 March 1893 – 20 December 1987) was a British Army officer who served in both world wars, a rugby player, Olympic athlete, and later a painter and author.

== Early life and military career ==
Harrison was born in March 1893 in Belgaum, India; his father, Major W. C. Warde Harrison, was an officer in the British Indian Army. Harrison, after being sent to England for his education, was educated at Cheltenham College before entering the Royal Military Academy, Woolwich, where Ronald Scobie, a future lieutenant general, was among his fellow students. While at Woolwich he played competitive rugby union for the army and for Kent and was selected by the Barbarians. From Woolwich he was commissioned into the Royal Garrison Artillery, having "failed to get Sappers by three or four places", as a second lieutenant on 19 December 1913, after which he was invited to play football for Southend United F.C. He took up hurdling and was soon selected to compete for England in the 120 metres hurdles against Scotland and Ireland.

== First World War ==
At the outbreak of the First World War, in August 1914, Harrison was posted first to Harwich, manning anti-aircraft guns, and then to France, where he was involved in intense fighting around Hooge. He was awarded the Military Cross (MC) in March 1915, the citation for which reads:

For gallantry and initiative at Givenchy, on 10th March, 1915, when he rushed up his gun under heavy shell fire and close-range rifle fire, and destroyed a hostile machine gun.

He was promoted to lieutenant in June, and, by now serving temporarily as an aide-de-camp to Major General Hubert Gough, then commanding I Corps, went on to fight at the Battle of Loos. He was promoted again, this time to the temporary rank of captain, in November 1916, a promotion which was made permanent a year later. In 1918 he was promoted to brevet major, making him, in his own words, "I believe the youngest in the British Army", and given command of an infantry school before appointment as a general staff officer first grade. By the end of the First World War, Harrison was attached to the 58th (London) Division and had been mentioned in despatches four times.

== Between the wars ==
Following the end of the war, Harrison resumed his sports careers. He was selected for the "Mother Country" rugby team (forerunner to the British and Irish Lions) in 1919, and played for the army against Oxford University in 1920. Harrison's rugby career ended prematurely due to injury, after which he refocused on hurdling; he was a member of the Surrey Athletic Club and was selected for the 1920 Summer Olympics but was prohibited from competing due to heart problems. He was appointed master of the Royal Artillery Harriers and then selected for staff college. He went on to compete at the 1924 Summer Olympics in Paris, and reached a semi-final in the 110 metres hurdles. After the Olympics, Harrison attended the British Army Staff College at Camberley from 1925 to 1926, although he later wrote, "I cannot say that I really enjoyed my two years" at Camberley. Despite this, he was fortunate in his instructors, men who "nearly all of them, were to prove their ability in the Second World War, its occurrence a possibility I believe none of us foresaw".

Harrison was then appointed adjutant to Lahore District, India, from 1928 to 1932. There he became master of the Lahore Hunt and took up big game shooting and racquets, in which he won the doubles event at the All India Championships. He returned to England in 1932, when he was promoted to permanent major. In 1934, Harrison was appointed a battery commander at Catterick Garrison in Yorkshire. Here he began painting, and eventually had three of his works hung at the Salon in Paris. Later that year, he was promoted to brevet lieutenant colonel and given command of the Oxford University Officer Training Corps (OTC) and lectured at the university on military history until he relinquished the post in 1938; he also became master of the South Oxfordshire Hunt.

In 1939, Harrison briefly served in Mandatory Palestine, commanding an infantry battalion at the end of the Arab Revolt under Major-General Bernard Montgomery, General Officer Commanding (GOC) 8th Infantry Division and a former Staff College instructor, who remarked that, "having loosed 'Dreadnought Harrison' on the task of killing rebels [...] he needed no urging in this respect". On 22 July 1939 Harrison was promoted to lieutenant colonel.

== Second World War ==
With the outbreak of the Second World War in September 1939, Harrison returned to England and was appointed Commander, Royal Artillery (CRA) with the 12th (Eastern) Infantry Division, based at Sevenoaks in Kent. Harrison was promoted to full colonel on 28 August 1939 (with seniority backdated to 1 January 1937), and, on the same date, to the temporary rank of brigadier. The 12th Division was sent overseas to France in April 1940 but left its artillery, and Harrison, behind.

Severely mauled during the Battle of France the following month, the 12th Division was disbanded in July and Harrison became Brigadier, Royal Artillery (BRA) in Northern Ireland District before being posted to Tunisia, where he served as Commander, Corps of Royal Artillery (CCRA) in IX Corps, under, initially, Lieutenant-General John Crocker, and, from late April 1943, Lieutenant-General Brian Horrocks.

After the end of the campaign, Harrison was promoted to major general and served in General Dwight D. Eisenhower's Allied Forces Headquarters (AFHQ) as Major General, Royal Artillery (MGRA); he was mentioned in despatches for his service during the Allied invasion of Sicily and continued in the post until 1943, when he returned to Britain to become General Officer Commanding (GOC) Sussex and Surrey District. Harrison was made a Commander of the Order of the British Empire (CBE) on 5 August 1943, and was promoted on 4 December 1943 to acting major-general. His rank of major-general was made temporary on 4 December 1944. He was made a Companion of the Order of the Bath (CB) in 1945, and appointed aide-de-camp to King George VI in 1945, and retired from the army on 28 May 1946, having been granted the honorary permanent rank of major general.

== Retirement ==
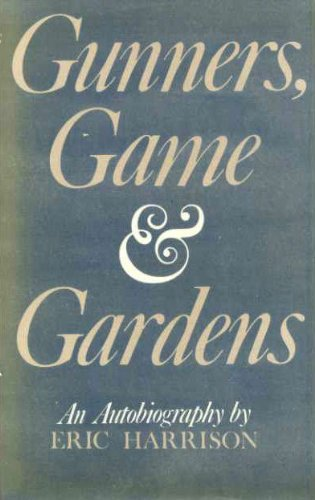
Book jacket for Harrison's autobiography, Gunners, Game & Gardens.

In retirement, Harrison lived in Cornwall. He became master of the North Cornwall Hounds and was appointed deputy lieutenant of Cornwall in 1955 and then High Sheriff of Cornwall in 1958. He also served as a justice of the peace, and chairman of St Lawrence's Hospital in Bodmin. In spare time, he grew rhododendrons and bred Labrador Retrievers, and fished for trout. He also published three books, including an autobiography, Gunners, Game & Gardens. His wife, Roza (née Stevenson), died in August 1967, "peacefully in her own home".

Harrison himself died over twenty years later in Amesbury, Wiltshire, on 20 December 1987 at the age of 94.

== Legacy ==
The National Portrait Gallery holds five photographic portraits of Harrison, three by Walter Stoneman from 1945 and two by Bassano Ltd from 1947.

== Publications ==
- —— (1949). Riding: a guide for beginners. illustrated by John Board.
- —— (1951). To Own a Dog. illustrated by the author.
- —— (1978). Gunners, Game & Gardens: An Autobiography. London: Cooper. ISBN 978-0-85052-245-7.

== Bibliography ==
- Who Was Who Volume VIII: 1981–1990. London: A&C Black. 1991. p. 331. ISBN 0713633360.
- Davies, David Twiston, ed. (2003). The Daily Telegraph Book of Military Obituaries. London: Grub Street. pp. 33–35. ISBN 1904010342.
- Harrison, Eric George William Warde (1978). Gunners, Game & Gardens: An Autobiography. London: Cooper. ISBN 978-0850522457.
- Smart, Nick (2005). Biographical Dictionary of British Generals of the Second World War. Barnsley, South Yorkshire: Pen and Sword Books. ISBN 1844150496.
