= Franklin Pitcher Johnson Jr. =

American venture capitalist (born 1928)

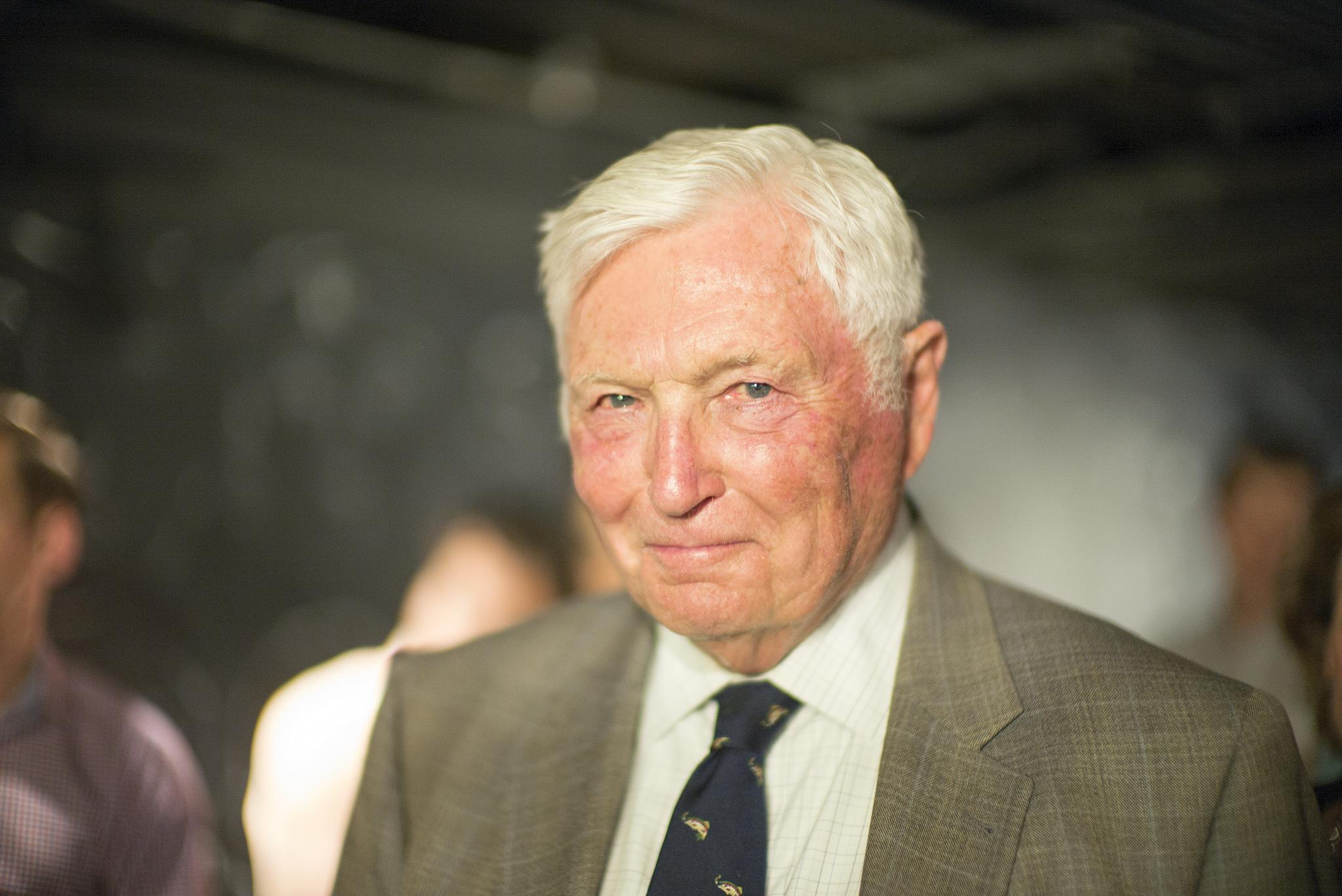
- Johnson Jr. in 2014
- Born: 1928 (age 97–98); Quincy, Illinois, U.S.
- Education: Palo Alto High School; Stanford University (1946–50); Harvard Business School (1950–52)
- Occupations: Venture capitalist; investor; lecturer
- Years active: 1962–present
- Known for: Founder of Asset Management Company
- Spouse: Catherine Johnson
- Children: 4
- Father: Pitch Johnson

Franklin Pitcher Johnson Jr., or Pitch Johnson, (born 1928) is an American venture capitalist and founder of multiple companies.

== Personal life ==
Franklin Pitcher Johnson Jr. was born in 1928 in Quincy, Illinois, and is the son of Franklin Pitcher "Pitch" Johnson, an Olympic track and field athlete and college coach. When he was 12 years old his family moved to Palo Alto, California. He studied at the Palo Alto High School where he ran on the track team. According to Johnson Jr., he was not as good at running as his father. Despite that, according to him, he has learned a lot of things from his father, "My dad taught me to shake hands with my opponents after the race, win or lose."

Johnson Jr. studied mechanical engineering at Stanford University (1946–50). After attending Harvard Business School (1950–52) he joined the US Air Force (1952–54) as an aircraft maintenance officer and worked in the Inland Steel Company's Indiana Harbor Works.

He has a wife Catherine, three sons, and one daughter. He describes himself as an Episcopalian and a Republican.

== Career ==
=== Venture capitalist ===
The US Congress passed a law in 1958 to foment the creation of venture capital under which the government would lend private capital. Johnson and his friend, Bill Draper, decided to co-found a venture capital company in Palo Alto. With a combination of savings and family loans, they formed Draper and Johnson Investment Company (D+J) in 1962. Johnson then took courses at Stanford at age 35 to study molecular biology and computer science. These studies were later useful for his investments in biotechnology and informatics. According to him, being "a local guy" has helped him since he knew many local entrepreneurs, lawyers, and other professionals and was easier for him to "check out" potential business partners.

In 1965 he founded a venture capital company, Asset Management Company. Apart from that, he has also helped found other companies including Amgen, Biogen Idec and Tandem. He said that as a rough estimate, of every 10 companies that he helped fund, one would return 20 or more times the investment, 3 or 4 doubled it, and the rest didn't lose nor win money, and they had to be sold, sometimes with losses and sometimes ending even.

=== Business leader and educator ===
He was director of the National Venture Capital Association and of the Western Association of Venture Capitalists, and also a trustee of the Foothill–De Anza Community College District for 12 years. He taught a class in entrepreneurship and venture capital for 12 years at The Stanford Graduate School of Business, beginning in 1979 and he remained active in the faculty through 2009. During his period of teaching at the Stanford Graduate School of Business Johnson gave a paper "The Entrepreneurial Climate" to the American Chamber of Commerce in Paris in 1982. The paper was published by Harvard Business School and the phrase "The Entrepreneurial Climate" became used in academic and government circles.

Since 1990, Johnson has been an advisor to various eastern European countries. Collaborating alongside the Amro Bank of the Netherlands, the European Bank for Reconstruction and Development (EBRD), and Polish, Czech and Slovak entrepreneurs and venture managers he aided in forming a venture investment company called European Renaissance Capital. Its goal has been to invest in and help new companies in Poland, Czechia, and Slovakia. Additionally, he has been involved in the creating of a buy-out fund in Romania and venture capital funds in Russia, Norway, and New Zealand. He was a member of the board of international advisers to the IESE Business School in Barcelona.
