= Arie van Leeuwen =

Dutch hurdler

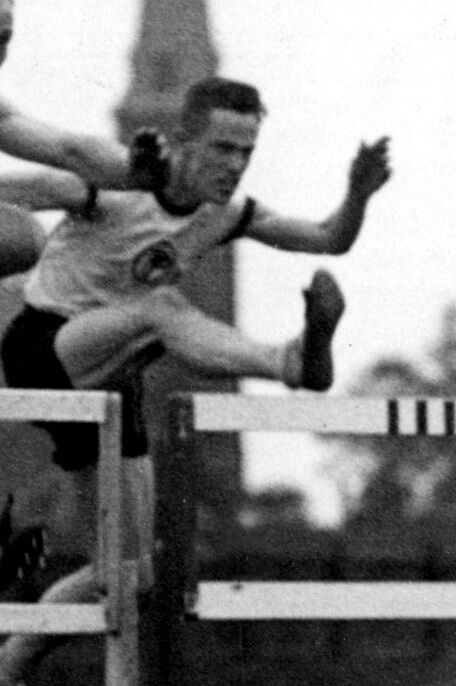
- Arie van Leeuwen in 1927

Personal information
- Nationality: Dutch
- Born: 3 February 1910 Haarlem, Netherlands
- Died: 9 August 2000 (aged 90)

Sport
- Sport: Track and field
- Event: 110 metres hurdles

Arie van Leeuwen (3 February 1910 – 9 August 2000) was a Dutch hurdler. He competed in the men's 110 metres hurdles at the 1928 Summer Olympics.
