= Karl Anderson (hurdler) =

American hurdler

Karl Walter Anderson (November 5, 1900 – February 28, 1989) was an American track and field athlete who competed in the 1924 Summer Olympics. He was born in Minneapolis, Minnesota. In 1924 he finished fifth in the 110 metre hurdles competition at the Paris Games.

Anderson was an All-American hurdler for the Minnesota Golden Gophers track and field team, finishing 3rd in the 110 m hurdles at the 1921 NCAA Track and Field Championships.
