= Gilbert Allart =

French hurdler

Personal information
- Nationality: French
- Born: 16 June 1902 Bailleul-sir-Berthoult, France
- Died: 17 December 1989 (aged 87) Douai, France

Sport
- Sport: Track and field
- Event: 110 metres hurdles

Gilbert Allart (16 June 1902 – 17 December 1989) was a French hurdler. He competed in the men's 110 metres hurdles at the 1924 Summer Olympics.
