= Rocky Valley Lutheran Church =

Historic church in Montana, United States

- U.S. National Register of Historic Places
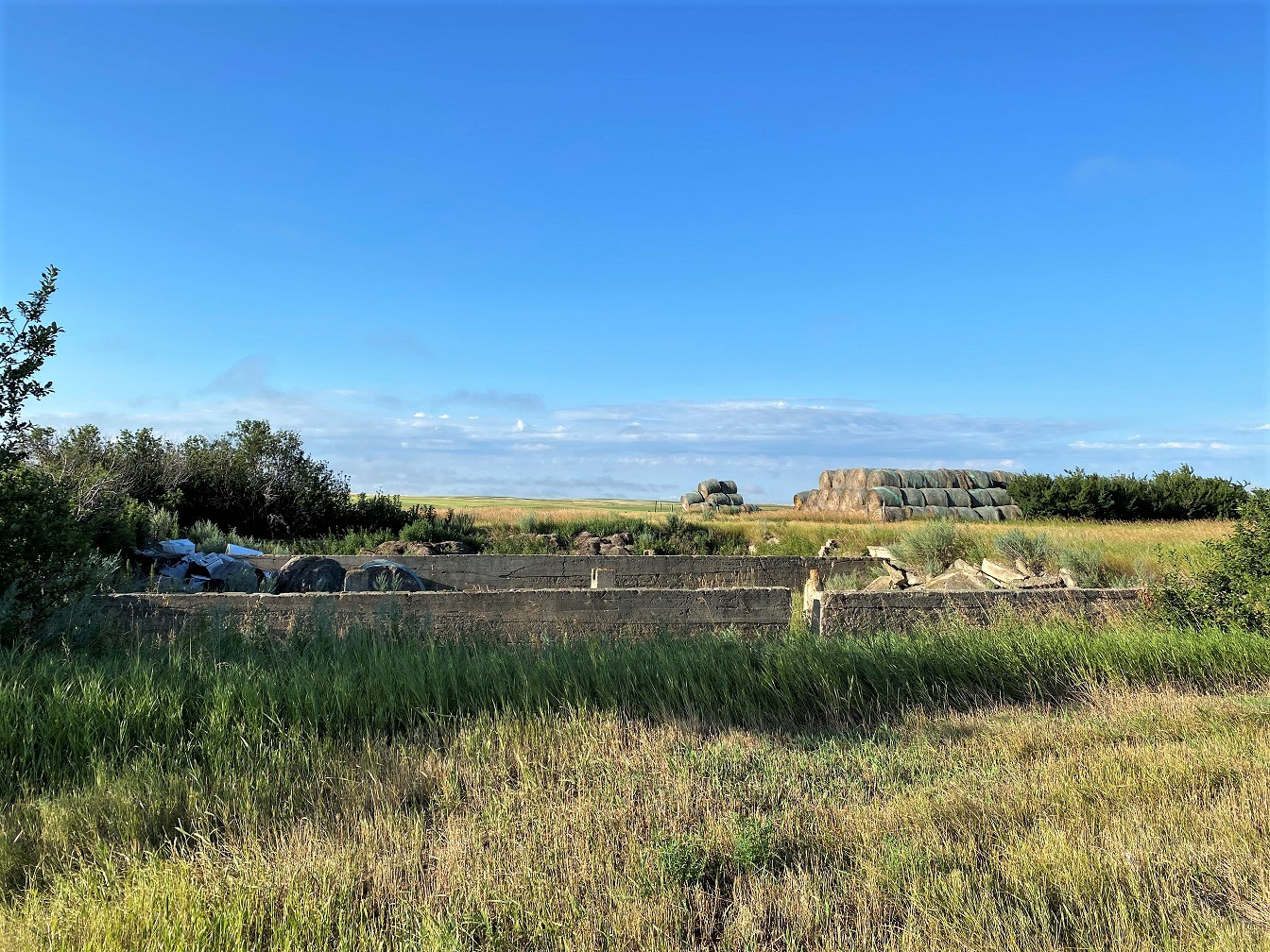
- Church's foundation

- Location within Montana Location within the United States
- Location: Junction of Ueland St. and an unnamed county road, Dooley, Montana
- Coordinates: 48°52′54″N 104°23′18″W
- Area: less than one acre
- Built: 1915
- Built by: Vossen, J.J.
- MPS: Sheridan County MPS
- NRHP reference No.: 93001145
- Added to NRHP: October 27, 1993

The Rocky Valley Lutheran Church in Dooley, Montana was built in January 1915. It was listed on the National Register of Historic Places in 1993. It has also been known as Dooley Lutheran Church.

In 1993, it was the only surviving historic major building in the Dooley townsite area. On July 8, 2019, the historic church collapsed due to a storm.
