= Dooher =

Dooher is a surname. Notable people with the surname include:

- Brian Dooher (born 1975), Irish Gaelic footballer
- John Anthony Dooher (born 1943), American Roman Catholic bishop
- Tom Dooher (born 1963), American teacher and trade unionist

== See also ==
- Dooler
