= Pitch Johnson =

American hurdler

Franklin Pitcher "Pitch" Johnson (January 2, 1901 – September 21, 1967) was an American track and field athlete who competed in the 1924 Summer Olympics. He was born in St. Louis, Missouri and died in Rubidoux, California.

In 1924 Johnson was selected for the US Olympic Team at the Paris Games in the 110 meter hurdles, and made it through to the semi-finals before being eliminated. He was an All-American long jumper for the Illinois Fighting Illini track and field team, finishing 4th in that event at the 1923 NCAA Track and Field Championships.

Johnson was the track and field coach (1928–40) and director of the Drake Relays (1933–40) at Drake University, and the director of track and field (1941–43) at Stanford University. He served as an athletic instructor there until the end of World War II. After the cessation of hostilities in the Pacific he went to the Philippines and Japan in 1945 for the US Army to organize and conduct the Pacific Army Olympics. He entered private business in Southern California in 1947.

He married Mary Caroline MacDavitt, whom he had met at the University of Illinois, in 1927. They had two children, Franklin Pitcher Johnson Jr., and Martin Lee Johnson, both of whom were track athletes at Stanford.

In 2009, he was selected by the U.S. Track & Field and Cross Country Coaches Association (USTFCCCA) for that organization's hall of fame. The award was given at their annual meeting in Orlando, FL on December 16, 2009. The citation issued by them read:

"Franklin Pitcher 'Pitch' Johnson's contributions to the sports of track & field and cross country extend far beyond his successful coaching career. Johnson helped establish the fledgling National Collegiate Track Coaches Association (NCTCA) (editor note: a predecessor of the USTFCCCA), serving as an officer from 1933 until his retirement from coaching, including a three-year stint as President (1935-1938). As a coach, Johnson put Drake University Track & Field on the map as head track & field coach from 1928 to 1940 and director of the Drake Relays from 1933 to 1940. Under his guidance, the Bulldogs earned ten team conference championships in track & field (six indoors and four outdoors), won 30 individual Missouri Valley Conference titles, and finished third (1938) and fourth (1939) in the first two years of the NCAA Cross Country Championships. Johnson ended his coaching career at Stanford University, serving as head track & field coach from 1940 to 1943."

Drake University established the title of "The Franklin P. Johnson Director of the Drake Relays" on April 22, 2010, in conjunction with the 101st running of the Relays. The first holder of the title, Brian Brown, was the director of the Relays from 2006 to 2016. He was succeeded in 2016 by Blake Boldon, the 12th director of the Drake Relays since its founding in 1912.
