= Hans Steinhardt =

German hurdler

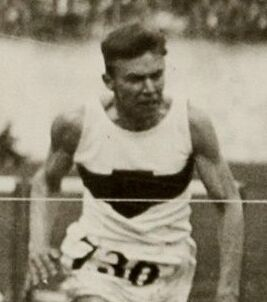
- Hans Steinhardt in 1928

Personal information
- Nationality: German
- Born: 29 June 1905
- Died: 1 December 1981 (aged 76)

Sport
- Sport: Track and field
- Event: 110 metres hurdles

Hans Steinhardt (29 June 1905 – 1 December 1981) was a German hurdler. He competed in the men's 110 metres hurdles at the 1928 Summer Olympics.
