= Alister Clark (athlete) =

Irish hurdler

Personal information
- Full name: Alexander Forbes Clark
- Nationality: Irish
- Born: 6 November 1903
- Died: 14 January 1987 (aged 83)

Sport
- Sport: Track and field
- Event: 110 metres hurdles

Alexander Forbes "Alister" Clark (6 November 1903 – 14 January 1987) was an Irish hurdler. He competed in the men's 110 metres hurdles at the 1928 Summer Olympics.
