= Dooly Southern Railway =

The Dooly Southern Railway was chartered in 1897 and operated 9 miles of track between Richwood, Georgia and Pinia, Georgia starting in 1898. It was operated by the Parrott Lumber Company and was mainly a logging line, but it also served as a common carrier. It was abandoned in 1903.
