= Lothar Albrich =

Romanian hurdler

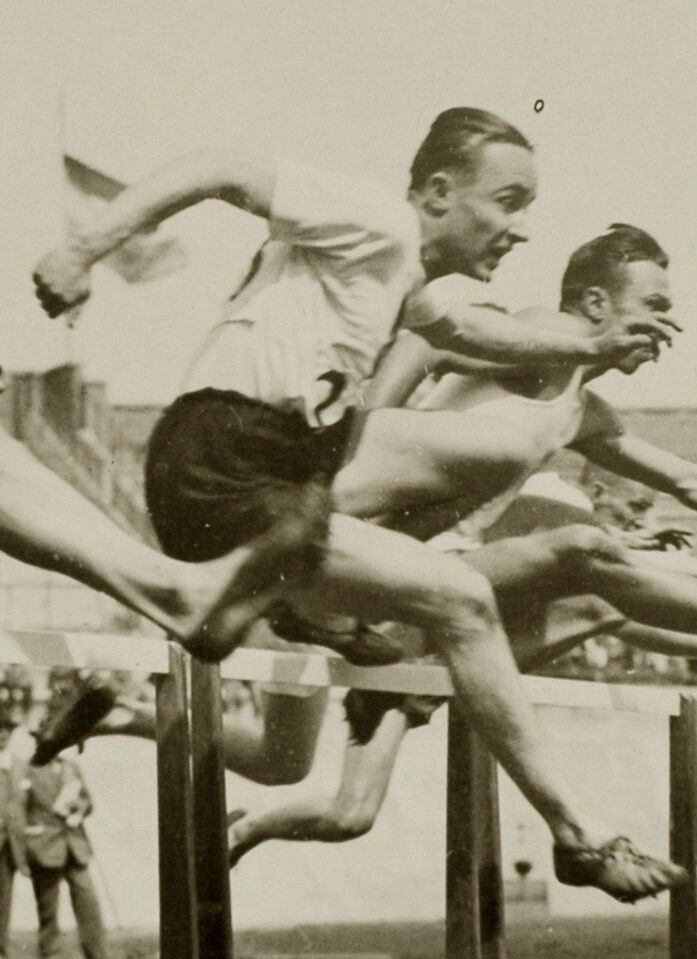
- Lothar Albrich in 1928

Personal information
- Nationality: Romanian
- Born: 20 July 1905 Brassó, Kingdom of Hungary, Austria-Hungary
- Died: 3 November 1978 (aged 73) Traunstein, Bavaria, West Germany

Sport
- Sport: Track and field
- Event: 110 metres hurdles

Lothar Albrich (20 July 1905 – 3 November 1978) was a Romanian hurdler. He competed in the men's 110 metres hurdles at the 1928 Summer Olympics.
