= Armand Lepaffe =

Belgian hurdler

Personal information
- Nationality: Belgian
- Born: 18 January 1908
- Died: 9 April 1981 (aged 73)

Sport
- Sport: Track and field
- Event: 110 metres hurdles

Armand Lepaffe (18 January 1908 – 9 April 1981) was a Belgian hurdler. He competed in the men's 110 metres hurdles at the 1928 Summer Olympics.
