= George Weightman-Smith =

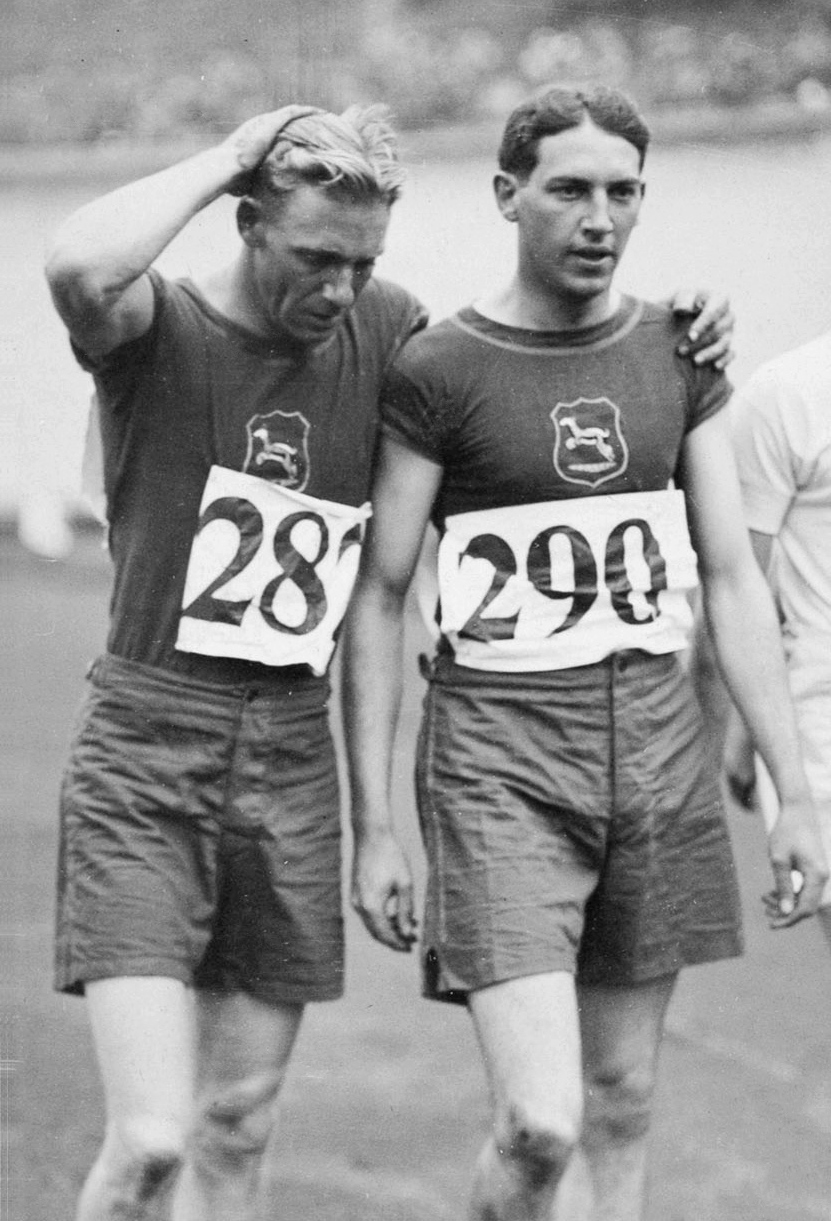
- Sid Atkinson and George Weightman-Smith (right) at the 1928 Olympics

Personal information
- Born: 31 October 1905 Durban, Colony of Natal, South Africa
- Died: April 1972 (aged 66)
- Height: 185 cm (6 ft 1 in)
- Weight: 73 kg (161 lb)

Sport
- Sport: Athletics
- Events: 110 m hurdles, decathlon
- Club: University of Cambridge AC; Achilles Club

Achievements and titles
- Personal best: 110 mH – 14.6 (1928)

George Collinson Weightman-Smith (31 October 1905 – April 1972) was a South African athlete who competed at the 1928 Summer Olympics.

== Career ==
Weightman-Smith studied at Selwyn College, Cambridge.

Weightman-Smith finished second behind Frederick Gaby in the 120 yards hurdles event at the British 1926 AAA Championships and repeated the feat the following year after finishing second behind Gaby again at the 1927 AAA Championships.

He finished second yet again, this time behind Stanley Lay in the javelin event at the 1928 AAA Championships. Shortly afterwards he represented South Africa at the 1928 Olympic Games in Amsterdam, Netherlands, where he finished 21st in the javelin throw and fifth in the 110 m hurdles, behind the teammate Sid Atkinson who won gold; he failed to complete his decathlon program.
