= Lindsay McNamara =

Australian rules footballer (1918–1991)

Personal information
- Full name: Lindsay Macknamara
- Born: 13 August 1918; Melbourne, Victoria
- Died: 7 October 1991 (aged 73)
- Height: 183 cm (6 ft 0 in)
- Weight: 86 kg (190 lb)

Playing career^{1}
| Years | Club | Games (Goals) |
| 1937–38 | Northcote (VFA) | 26 (25) |
| 1939–40 | South Melbourne | 4 (4) |
| 1940–41 | Fitzroy | 4 (1) |
| 1941 | Northcote (VFA) | 11 (9) |
| 1943 | Sturt-South | 2 (0) |
| 1946 | Northcote (VFA) | 4 (1) |
- ^{1} Playing statistics correct to the end of 1943.

Lindsay McNamara (13 August 1918 – 7 October 1991) was an Australian rules footballer who played with South Melbourne and Fitzroy in the Victorian Football League (VFL).

== Family ==
The only child of Samuel Macknamara (1865–1945) and Emma May Macknamara (1884–1969), née Bull, Lindsay Macknamara was born in Melbourne, Victoria on 13 August 1918.

Lindsay Macknamara married Joyce Florence Fleet on 29 April 1939 (in the evening following his second appearance for South Melbourne).

note: while practically all official government records use the surname Macknamara, most football records have the surname McNamara.

== Football ==
=== Northcote (VFA) ===
Originally from Abbotsford Lindsay McNamara commenced his senior football career aged 18, playing for Northcote in the Victorian Football Association. He played in the centre and as a forward, averaging close to a goal a game in his first two seasons of senior football.

=== South Melbourne (VFL) ===
The strong form he had shown in his first two seasons led to a bidding war for his services at the start of the 1939 season and he ultimately ended up signing with South Melbourne. He made a promising start, playing in each of the first three rounds, but injured his knee in his third game and he did not appear again during the 1939 season. Macknamara returned in the 1940 VFL season, scoring three goals in South's opening round loss to Collingwood, but he was dropped for the next round.

=== Fitzroy (VFL) ===
Fitzroy then secured Macknamara's services, and in Round 4 of the 1940 VFL season he played for them against Essendon. Mackanamara struggled to secure a regular position in Fitzroy's team and made a total of four appearances in the season and half he was with the club.

=== Return to Northcote (VFA) ===
In June 1941, Macknamara was granted a permit to return to Northcote in the VFA and he played the last 11 games of the season for them.

=== Sturt–South (SANFL) ===
In 1943, while serving in the Royal Australian Air Force, Macknamara played two games for the combined Sturt-South team that competed in the 1943 SANFL war-merger competition.

=== Northcote (VFA) ===
Following his discharge from active service in World War II, Macknamara again played for Northcote during the 1946 VFA season.

== Military service ==
Aged 23, Macknamara enlisted to serve in the RAAF in early 1942, and he served until the end of the war, including time in Morotai, Darwin and Balikpapan.
