= Willi Moser (athlete) =

Swiss hurdler

Personal information
- Nationality: Swiss
- Born: 17 March 1894 Wangen an der Aare, Bern, Switzerland
- Died: 18 November 1963 (aged 69) Biel/Bienne, Bern, Switzerland

Sport
- Sport: Track and field
- Event: 110 metres hurdles / javelin
- Club: FC Biel

Willi Moser (17 March 1894 – 18 November 1963) was a Swiss hurdler, who competed at two Olympic Games.

== Career ==
Moser competed in the 110 metres hurdles at the 1920 Summer Olympics and the 1924 Summer Olympics.

Moser finished third behind Paavo Johansson in the javelin throw event at the British 1922 AAA Championships.
