= Tom Philpott =

American professor of history (1942–1991)

- Philpott in Boys for Sale, 1981
- Born: Thomas Lee Philpott; January 21, 1942; Chicago, Illinois, U.S.
- Died: October 9, 1991 (aged 49); Austin, Texas, U.S.
- Occupations: Professor; amateur investigator
- Spouse: Anne Sugrue (m. 1963; div. 1979)

Academic background
- Education: Loyola University Chicago; University of Chicago
- Thesis: The Slum and the Ghetto: Immigrants, Blacks, and Reformers in Chicago, 1880–1930

Academic work
- Discipline: History
- Institutions: University of Texas

Thomas Lee Philpott (January 21, 1942 – October 9, 1991) was an American professor of history at the University of Texas who focused on urban history. He was also known for his independent research into child prostitution.

== Early life and education ==
Philpott was born on January 21, 1942, in Chicago, Illinois, and was of Irish ancestry. His maternal grandfather had come to the United States to join his brother and sister in the city. His maternal grandmother descended from peasants escaping the Great Famine of Ireland, as did his paternal side. Philpott's father was an accounting clerk who died a year after he was born, while his mother was an executive secretary for the Rock Island Railroad. Philpott spent most of his early years with his grandparents on the South Side of Chicago. Philpott described his grandfather as complex but inarticulate, though he emphasized the importance of an education, while he described his grandmother as "the nicest human being [he had] ever known."

Philpott first attended Loyola University Chicago in 1959, majoring in English. While attending Loyola, he organized a protest against a segregated swimming pool. The protest would come to an end due to the owners of the swimming pool being benefactors to the university. Philpott would graduate from Loyola in 1963 with a degree in history.

He would later enroll in a doctorate program at the University of Chicago. During this time, he worked as a bus driver and at a local newsstand. In 1969, Philpott accepted an instructorship from the University of Texas.

== Involvement with the University of Texas ==
=== McGeorge Bundy protest ===
In 1975, UT president Lorene Rogers invited former national security advisor McGeorge Bundy to speak at the university's graduation ceremony. Some students heckled Bundy during his speech due to his involvement in the Vietnam War. Philpott and his colleague Dr. Standish Meacham walked out. Both Meacham and Philpott would state that they did not intend to walk out and did not do so as a protest of Bundy, but instead because of heavy-handed treatment by campus police and administrators of student protesters during the commencement.

=== 1975 raise cut ===
Following the Bundy protest in 1975, Philpott and seven other professors claimed that Rogers had cut their raises following criticisms of her administration, despite recommendations by the deans. A few professors claimed that they believed their pay cuts were due to union organization with the Texas Association of College Teachers, which sought pay raises for staff, though Philpott and the others claimed that their pay decreases were due to political advocacy and personal disagreements.

Philpott would claim that he had over $1,100 cut from his paycheck and that two other history professors also filing suit had $1,000 cut. Rogers would claim that the cut was "purely a coincidence". Philpott only received $900; neither he nor a colleague received the extra $400 annual supplement which the president's office had given to nearly 90% of the faculty on top of merit raises that were recommended by departments.

Philpott would go on the record to state: "When she hit us with the pocketbook, she thought that was where we lived; she thought that was the place to penalize us. What she didn't know was that was not where we live." Philpott would also pledge that if his $1,100 was restored, he would donate one-third to the NAACP Legal Defense and Educational Fund, an additional one-third to the Mexican American Legal Defense and Educational Fund, and the last one-third to Sponsors of Open Housing Development.

Dave Richards, an attorney for the ACLU, asked a federal judge to restore the pay increases and to forbid the university's right to take actions that would jeopardize the free speech of the professors.

=== 1977 Senate confirmation ===
In February 1977, a Senate confirmation hearing was underway for three new UT regents appointed by Texas governor Dolph Briscoe. The appointees included Briscoe's close political allies and his personal physician. Many critics had concerns about conflicts of interest, as one appointee, Jess Hay, had represented Southern Methodist University and was on their board of governors.

Philpott would run a drive to block the confirmation by the state Senate through circulating a petition to faculty and students and providing backgrounds of the candidates to senators. Subsequently, the Senate confirmed the appointments before Philpott could gather a quorum, which included 15% of the faculty, to vote on a resolution against the appointments. Philpott would later claim that many members had not voted on the quorum due to fears of political repercussions.

== Research into child prostitution ==
Philpott's research into child prostitution began in 1979, following a film John Kellis, a student of his, had created titled Boys for Sale. After Philpott watched the film, he began spending weekends observing and interviewing boy hustlers in Houston. During this time, Philpott said his children had been followed and that prominent, wealthy men involved in youth prostitution had been spying on him and sending individuals to provoke him into violent confrontations.

In October 1981, Boys for Sale (separate from Kellis' film) aired under the program Alternative Views and starred Philpott. It was a two-part series on the abuse of male youths in prostitution. Philpott claimed that he found abuse of children frequently resulting in death, estimating that thousands of youths were killed annually as a result. He also claimed many of the men involved were at high levels of the United States government and corporations.

In 1982, Philpott would mention in a newspaper article: "Their alternatives are to go to petty crime; somehow to find work that can support a child; go to authorities, who don't have the facilities for children: or do this [prostitution]. This is the easiest, and it's the most lucrative." Philpott would state in another publication that investigated homeless youths in Texas: "A lot of boys who run away from home head for Texas the way other people stream for Texas."

On October 27, 1981, Philpott received a gunshot wound to his shoulder. He claimed that two intruders broke into his apartment and shot him with his .38-caliber automatic pistol that he kept on a shelf beside his bed. According to Philpott, the incident was in response to his investigations into organized child prostitution. Philpott also believed that the attack was meant to discredit his work by giving the impression to the public that he had committed suicide. Austin police believed that he had shot himself as a publicity stunt and stopped the investigation after Philpott declined to take a polygraph. He claimed that he refused because he was manic-depressive, and he felt manic-depressives did not test reliably.

In January 1985, Philpott was arrested outside of his apartment complex for impersonating a police officer. Philpott notified police earlier in the day that he believed individuals inside one of the apartments had been abusing two children, aged 2 and 4. After he notified police, Philpott knocked on the tenant's door and told the woman who answered that he was a police officer. Philpott would ask the woman and children to leave the apartment. When police arrived, Philpott was arrested for unlawfully carrying a weapon, as a .32 caliber automatic pistol was found in the waistband of his pants. While in custody, he would be charged with impersonating a police officer and received a $5,000 fine. Philpott would be released on a $500 bail and on personal recognizance. No charges were filed against the tenants for child abuse.

== Personal life suicide ==
His son, Tommy Philpott, majored in history at UT, was a lecturer at an Austin Community College, and was the co-founder of the left-wing publication Polemicist.

On October 9, 1991, Philpott died in his home in Austin, Texas, from a self-inflicted gunshot wound to the chest.
