= Dooley, Montana =

Dooley
- Ghost town
- Location within Montana Location within the United States
- Coordinates: 48°52′52″N 104°23′22″W
- Country: United States
- State: Montana
- County: Sheridan
- Established: 1913
- Abandoned: 1957
- Elevation: 2,461 ft (750 m)
- GNIS feature ID: 770722

Dooley is a ghost town in northeastern Sheridan County, Montana, United States. The town was established as a station stop and one of the first four depots along the Soo Line Railroad branch line to Whitehall.

== History ==
The town began in 1912 or earlier, when the railroad was coming through and landed on the corner of W.D Dooley's property. Around 40 buildings went up at once, to become the business area. It was one of the only towns not to move since the beginning of the railroad. George Epler was the town cashier and the organizer of the Citizen State Bank. Guy Clerke and the Epler Brothers had two general stores in town. George Wright owned the hardware store, where they would hold different gatherings upstairs, until the theater was built. The Confectionery and the post office was owned by Peter Hegseth. The post office at Dooley operated from at least 1912 to 1957. He had to rebuild them after they caught in a fire. There were two saloons in town; one was owned by Hans Nelson and the other by Jim Kings.

Although the land around Dooley attracted numerous homesteaders during the first years following the railroad's completion, the region proved to be unsuited for intensive agricultural use, and by the 1920s the town was in decline. Though the railroad remains in operation, Dooley is now a ghost town. The only building that was still standing is the long-abandoned Rocky Valley Lutheran Church, which was listed on the National Register of Historic Places in 1993. The church collapsed on the morning of July 8, 2019.

Ted Nelson was a popular man in town and owned many of the businesses. He bought the Herman Bretzke building and started the first restaurant in Dooley. Mrs. Nelson managed the restaurant. The Racket (Variety) Store was owned by Ted. Ted also then bought and started a meat market, and had Christ Grythnes as the meat cutter. His meat market was one of the two in town. The other was caught in all three of Dooley’s fires.

The first edition of the newspaper, The Dooley Sun was dated November 7, 1913. The paper was owned and edited by W.R. Vezina. The electric plant was run by Loyal Goss. He had also bought the Feed Mill from M.E. Lerbeck and Iver Johnson. The power was turned on every evening till midnight, also on Tuesdays during the day for a few hours for the women to do the washing and ironing. The power would blink ten minutes before midnight to let everyone know that it would be turned off shortly. The blacksmith shop was owned by Ed Campell and Newt Shaw. They did very well in their business, sharpening plowshares and keeping machinery in shape. The blacksmith shop had a few owners after the original ones moved away. There were other business around the town, some of them were short lived, while others were sold to new owners. There were two doctors in town, Dr. Sells and Dr. Cooper. There were a lot of different business in the early days of Dooley. As time went on they slowly died out. The town had a Commercial Club, Fire Department, a band and a baseball team. There were two barbers in town. At one time there were four different lumber yards.

There were three elevators built, because of the large amount of grain that crossed the Canada–US border. Nels Markuson managed the elevators. Otto and Arthur Stadig built a big barn to board horses. They were able to care for over 100 horses. The mail was delivered from Plentywood in 1913–1914. The first postmaster of Dooley was Peter Hegseth, who ran the office out of his house. There were two other postmasters, Willard Markuson and Ambrose Schumacher. The post office was closed in June 1957, and a route was established out of Westby. Church was held in George Wrights Hall, and led by Rev. F.E. Henry. Then it was held by Fr. Hennssey. The Rocky Valley Lutheran Church was built in 1915. The Ladies Aid furnished it. The first minister was Rev. S.J. Fretheim, and his first serviced was held in P.T. Hegseth farm house. After 1945 the church had closed due to so many people leaving the area, and was sold to a local farmer.

In the fall of 1913, the school district was formed along with the school board that consisted of, Jim King, George Epler, and W.D. Dooley. For three years an old homestead shack was used as their classroom, where Miss Alice Murphy taught. In 1915 a school was built and the classes become more regular. Until 1931 the grade school children were taught in the large room, and then it was decided that a high school should be built. The new high school had its first graduating class in 1932, with six students. The high school also had their own newspaper, "The Dooley Dew," then later changed to fit the mascot to "The Eagle Eye." The high school tried to create a radio station, but due to the lack of power they never bought a license for it. Over time the families around moved away and the local children were bused to Plentywood for school.

Dooley suffered many different kinds of disasters. In May 1916, the west side of Main Street caught on fire, wrecking many of the businesses. Four years later the east side suffered a fire destroying many of the local businesses. Also a year before, in 1919 a smaller fire took place and wrecked a garage and two smaller businesses. In 1934 a tornado came through town, wiping out the Stadig Livery Barn. The town also suffered infestations of armyworms, grasshoppers and Mormon crickets, which harmed local agriculture. Some of the winters that the town faced were very severe and kept the train from passing through. The trains feared that they would freeze up or run out of fuel.

Over the years people moved to the surrounding areas due to the fires and infestations. The town's population slowly dwindled and the buildings were sold or torn down. The elevators were sold to Jim Syme.

== See also ==
- Rocky Valley Lutheran Church, listed on the National Register of Historic Places
