= Owen Guyatt =

Australian rules footballer

Personal information
- Full name: Owen Henry Guyatt
- Born: 26 April 1921; Boulder, Western Australia
- Died: 13 October 1991 (aged 70)
- Height: 178 cm (5 ft 10 in)
- Weight: 81 kg (179 lb)

Playing career^{1}
Years	Club	Games (Goals)
1945	South Melbourne	4 (1)
- ^{1} Playing statistics correct to the end of 1945.

Owen Henry Guyatt (26 April 1921 – 13 October 1991) was an Australian rules footballer who played with South Melbourne in the Victorian Football League (VFL).
