= Fred Gaby =

English hurdler

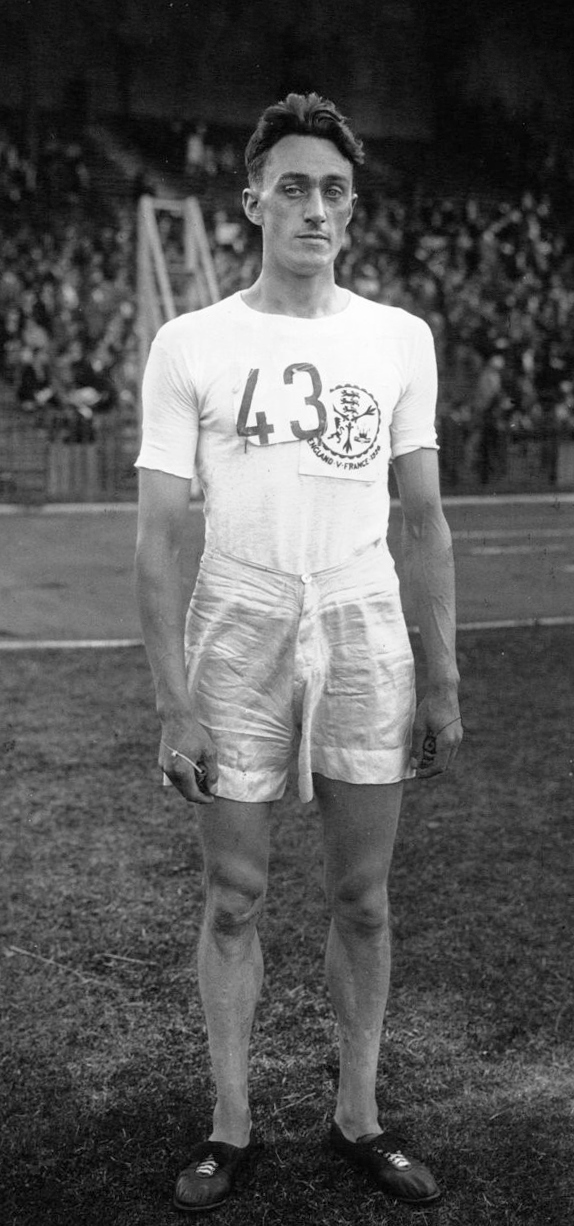
- Fred Gaby in 1926

Personal information
- Born: 12 March 1895 Marylebone, London, Great Britain
- Died: 7 April 1984 (aged 89) Storrington, West Sussex, England

Sport
- Sport: Athletics
- Event: Hurdles
- Club: Polytechnic Harriers

Achievements and titles
- Personal best: 110 mH – 14.9 (1927/28)
Medal record
Representing England
British Empire Games
Bronze medal – third place	1930 Hamilton	120 yd hurdles

Frederick Richard Gaby (12 March 1895 – 7 April 1984) was an English hurdler who competed in the 110 metre event at the 1924 and 1928 Summer Olympics.

== Biography ==
During World War I, Gaby served as an airman. Gaby started as a flat sprinter, and changed to hurdles only in 1919, upon advice from his coach Sam Mussabini. He then won five out of eight international competitions and was selected for two Olympics.

Gaby became the national 120 yards hurdles champion after winning the British AAA Championships title at the 1922 AAA Championships. The following year he successfully defended his title at the 1923 AAA Championships but only managed second place in 1924.

Shortly afterwards at the 1924 Olympic Games, he was eliminated in the semi-finals. In 1925, Gaby won another AAA title, this time in a national record of 15.2 seconds, a time he matched in repeating his AAA title defence in 1926. He improved the mark even further to 14.9, when winning yet another AAA title at the 1927 AAA Championships.

At the 1928 Olympic Games, he finished sixth in the 110 metres hurdles.

Gaby won the bronze medal in the 120 yards hurdles at the 1930 British Empire Games, aged between 41 - 45. After retiring from competitions in 1930 he became a shoe repairer.
