= Arie Kaan =

Dutch hurdler

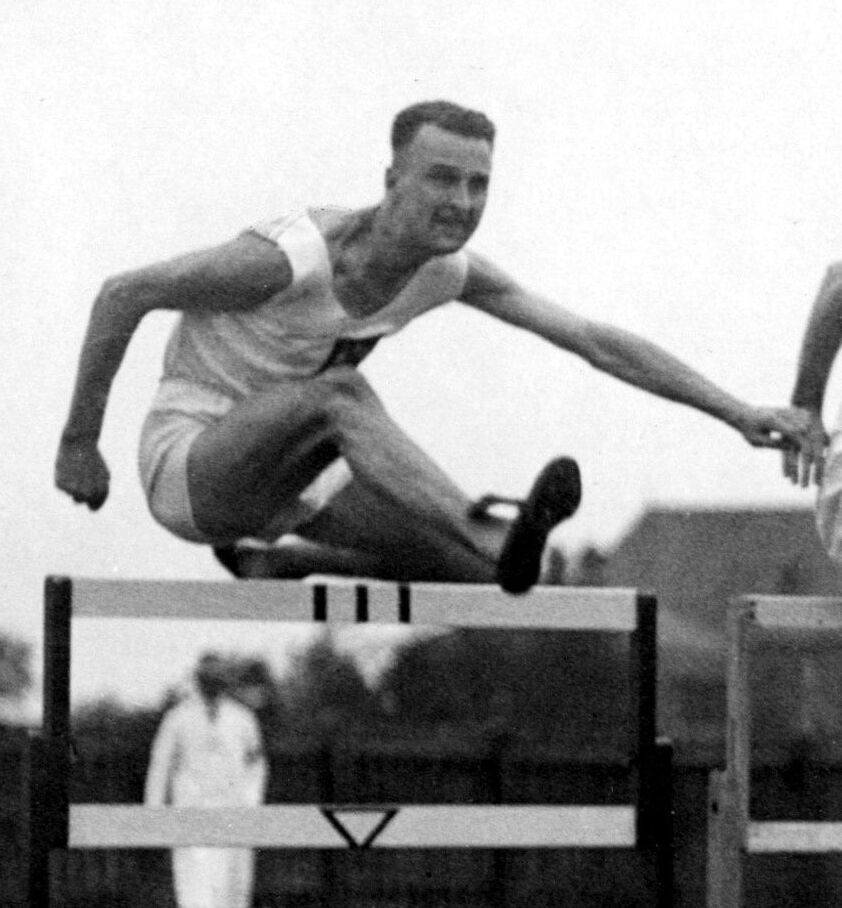
- Arie Kaan in 1927

Personal information
- Nationality: Dutch
- Born: 22 December 1901 Haarlem, Netherlands
- Died: 8 October 1991 (aged 89)

Sport
- Sport: Track and field
- Event: 110 metres hurdles

Arie Kaan (22 December 1901 – 8 October 1991) was a Dutch hurdler. He competed in the men's 110 metres hurdles at the 1928 Summer Olympics.
