= Lee Boltin =

American photographer

- Born: November 19, 1917; New York City, US
- Died: October 29, 1991 (aged 73)
- Education: American Museum of Natural History
- Occupation: Photographer

Lee Boltin (November 19, 1917 - October 29, 1991) was an American photographer.

== Biography ==
Boltin was born in New York City. He was trained at the American Museum of Natural History which he left in 1954. He died of leukemia at the age of 73 on October 29, 1991. During his life he made photographs for books Tutankhamen: The Tomb and Its Treasures in 1977 and Masterpieces of Primitive Art in 1978.
