= Bo Westerberg =

Swedish sailor

Axel Bo Bernhardt Stensson Westerberg (20 November 1913 – 2 October 1991) was a Swedish Olympic sailor. In the 1936 Summer Olympics, he sailed with the 8-metre Ilderim, helmed by Tore Holm, and finished 4th.
