= Mike Dooley =

American author, speaker, and entrepreneur

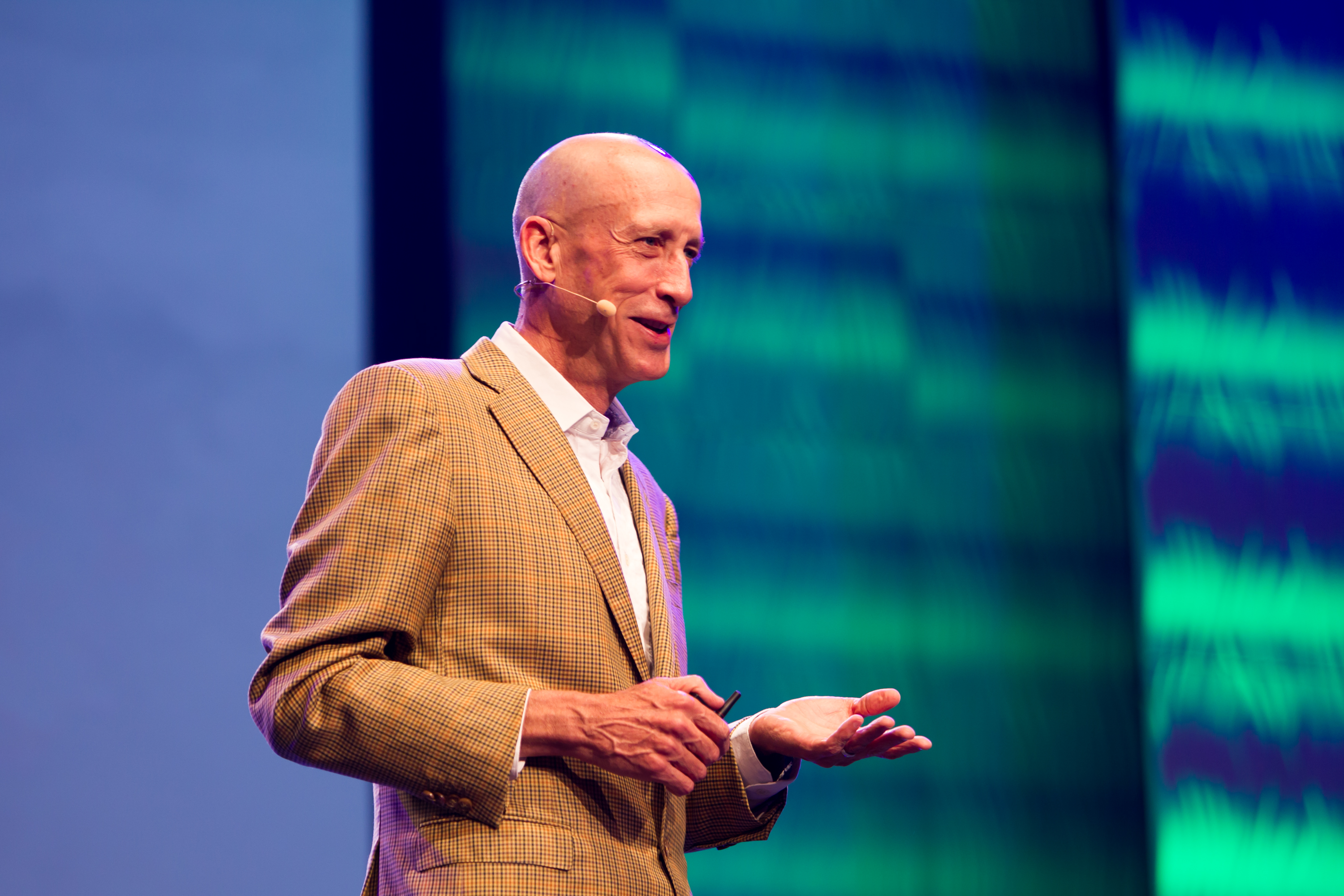
- Born: February 7, 1961 (age 65); Orange, California, U.S.
- Education: University of Florida

Mike Dooley (born 7 February 1961, Orange, California) is a New York Times bestselling author, speaker, and entrepreneur in the philosophical New Thought movement. His teachings contain the premise that our "thoughts become things," an expression he made popular in Rhonda Byrne's book and video documentary on the Law of Attraction, The Secret.

== Education ==
Dooley graduated from the University of Florida in 1983 with a Bachelor of Science in accounting.

== Career ==
Dooley worked in Florida, Saudi Arabia, and Massachusetts as an international tax specialist for Price Waterhouse Coopers before co-founding TUT Enterprises, Inc. in 1989 with his brother, Andy Dooley and mother.

TUT sold its own line of T-shirts and gifts from a small chain of stores and through a distributor in Jyoetsu, Japan. In 1999 the company wound down retail and wholesale operations and Dooley became the sole shareholder, transforming the business into today's TUT's Adventurer's Club, a philosophical club for understanding and living the adventure of life. By October 2021, there were 1 million members, all of whom receive Dooley's daily e-mailings, "Notes from the Universe", which have spun off into books, calendars, greeting cards, and world tours.

Dooley's work has been published in 27 languages.

== Books and other publications ==
- Dooley, Mike (1998). Totally Unique Thoughts. ISBN 0964216817.
- Dooley, Mike; Dooley, Michael (1998). Lost in Space. ISBN 0964216825.
- Thoughts Become Things (Audio Program). 2001. ISBN 0964216884.
- Infinite Possibilities: The Art of Living Your Dreams (Audio Program). 2002. ISBN 0964216868.
- Leveraging the Universe and Engaging the Magic (Audio Program). 2004. ISBN 978-0743571395.
- Dooley, Mike (2007). Notes from the Universe: New Perspectives from an Old Friend. ISBN 978-1582701769.
- Dooley, Mike (2008). More Notes From the Universe: Life, Dreams and Happiness. ISBN 978-1582701844.
- Dooley, Mike (2008). Even More Notes From the Universe: Dancing Life's Dance. ISBN 978-1582701868.
- Manifesting Change: It Couldn't Be Easier. 2008. ISBN 9780976542070.
- Dooley, Mike (2009). Choose Them Wisely: Thoughts Become Things!. ISBN 978-1582702339.
- Dooley, Mike (2009). Infinite Possibilities: The Art of Living Your Dreams. ISBN 978-1582702261.
- Thoughts Become Things (DVD). 2009.
- Everything You Ever Wanted to Know about Life... but Were Afraid to Ask (Audio Program). 2010. ISBN 978-0981460246.
- 2012 – A Wrinkle in Time (DVD). 2010.
- Dooley, Mike (2010). Manifesting Change: It Couldn't Be Easier. ISBN 978-1582702759.
- Manifesting Change (DVD). 2010.
- Dooley, Mike (2011). Leveraging the Universe: 7 Steps to Engaging Life's Magic. ISBN 9781582703145.
- Perpetual Calendar. Notes from the Universe. 2012. ISBN 9780981460215.
- Dooley, Michael; Dooley, Mike (2012). Notes from the Universe: A 60-Card Deck. ISBN 9780981460260.
- Dooley, Mike (2012). An Adventurer's Guide to the Jungles of Time and Space. ISBN 9780981460253.
- The Path Less Traveled (DVD). 2013.
- Dooley, Mike (2013). Dreams Come True, All They Need is You! (Kid's Book). ISBN 9780981460277.
- Dooley, Mike (2014). The Top Ten Things Dead People Want to Tell You. ISBN 978-1401945565.
- Dooley, Mike; Tyquiengco, Gina (2015). Notes from the Universe Coloring Book. ISBN 9781401950514.
- Dooley, Mike (2016). Notes from the Universe on Abundance: A 60-Card Deck. ISBN 9781401950224.
- Dooley, Mike (2015). Your Magical Life (Kid's Book). ISBN 9780981460284.
- Dooley, Mike (2016). Life on Earth. ISBN 9781781804018.
- Dooley, Mike; Farquhar, Tracy (2017). From Deep Space with Love. ISBN 9781401952822.
- Notes from the Universe on Love & Connection: A 60-Card Deck. 2017. ISBN 9781401954703.
- Dooley, Mike (2017). Playing the Matrix: A Program for Living Deliberately and Creating Consciously. ISBN 9781401950606.
- Dooley, Mike (2020). A Beginner's Guide To The Universe. ISBN 9781401955045.
- Dooley, Mike (2020). The Complete Notes From the Universe. ISBN 9781582707297.
