= John Collier (athlete) =

American hurdler

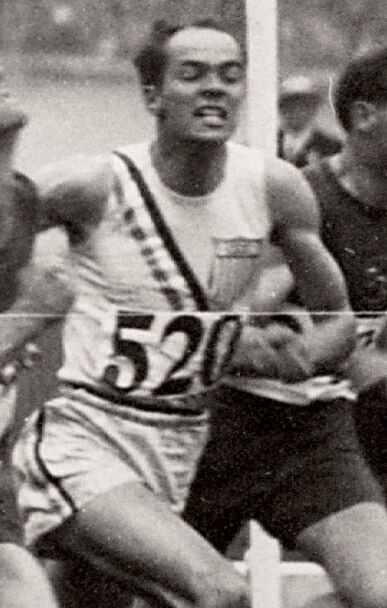

Medal record

Men's athletics

Representing the United States
Bronze medal – third place	1928 Amsterdam	110 metre hurdles

John Sheldon Collier (September 26, 1907 – October 31, 1984) was an American athlete who competed mainly in the 110 metre hurdles.

Born in Buffalo, New York, he competed for the United States in the 1928 Summer Olympics held in Amsterdam, Netherlands in the 110 metre hurdles where he won the bronze medal.
