= Doris Lilly =

American journalist

- Born: December 26, 1926; South Pasadena, California
- Died: October 9, 1991 (aged 64)
- Notable works: New York Post

Doris Lilly (c.1922/26 December 1926 – 9 October 1991) was an American newspaper columnist and writer. Lilly wrote newspaper columns on high society for the New York Post between 1968 and 1978, and the New York Daily Mirror.

== Life ==
Lilly was born in South Pasadena, California and she was schooled in Santa Monica. Lilly was a contract player for film producer Cecil B. DeMille in her youth, before dating actor Ronald Reagan in the 1950s after his divorce from Jane Wyman. Two letters that Reagan sent her during their relationship were auctioned at Sotheby's by Lilly in 1988 while Reagan was serving as President of the United States; the letters were bought by Malcolm Forbes and given to Reagan's wife, Nancy.

Lilly was a socialite and wrote several books about people of great wealth including Glamor Girl (1977; with co-author Robin Moore) and Those Fabulous Greeks: Onassis, Niarchos and Livanos (1970). Lilly has been cited as, and claimed herself, that she was an inspiration for Holly Golightly, the lead character in Truman Capote's novella Breakfast at Tiffany's.

The similarity of the title of Lilly's first book, How to Meet a Millionaire, to that of the 1953 musical film How to Marry a Millionaire, has contributed to a misconception (unfortunately included in several of her obituaries) that the movie was an adaptation of the book; in fact, however, the film's credited sources were two plays (one by Zoe Akins, the other by Dale Eunson and Katherine Albert). Lilly published an updated version of the book in 1984 as How to Meet a Billionaire, commenting that "A million dollars isn't much money these days. You can't even get a decent house for that." The New York Post columnist Cindy Adams said that Lilly was "never fond of poverty", and Lilly herself said that the people she wrote about as a gossip columnist were sometimes "shallow" but were "pleasant and they smell good and they eat well and drink good wines, and that's all right."

Lilly wrote for several publications, including as a contributor to Avenue, Cosmopolitan, Ladies' Home Journal, McCall's magazines, as beauty editor of Town and Country. On television Lilly was a commentator on WPIX and a guest on panel shows and The Merv Griffin Show.

== Bibliography ==
- How to Meet a Millionaire (1951)
- How to Make Love in Five Languages (1965)
- Those Fabulous Greeks: Onassis, Niarchos and Livanos (1970)
- Glamour Girl (1977, with Robin Moore)
- How to Meet a Billionaire (1984)
