= Penia, Georgia =

Unincorporated community in Georgia, U.S.

Coordinates: 31°58′12″N 83°42′01″W

Penia is an unincorporated community in Crisp County, in the U.S. state of Georgia.

== History ==
Variant names are "Pina" and "Pinia". The name is indicative of the many pine trees at the original town site. A post office called Pinia was established in 1890, and remained in operation until 1908.
