= Walter Stude =

American field hockey player

Walter William Stude (December 3, 1913 in Kingston, Ontario – October 25, 1991) was an American field hockey player. He played at the 1948, 1952, and 1956 Summer Olympics. He was born in Canada, but moved as a child to Catonsville, Maryland.
