= Jack Fidler =

Australian rules footballer, born 1905

Personal information
- Full name: Jack Fidler
- Born: 29 September 1905
- Died: 1 October 1991 (aged 86)
- Original team: Essendon reserves

Playing career^{1}
Years	Club	Games (Goals)
1926–27	St Kilda	19 (2)
- ^{1} Playing statistics correct to the end of 1927.

Jack Fidler (29 September 1905 – 1 October 1991) was an Australian rules footballer who played with St Kilda in the Victorian Football League (VFL).
