= Steve Dooler =

English rugby league footballer

Personal information
- Full name: Steve Dooler
- Born: 31 December 1977 (age 47)

Playing information
- Position: Centre, Stand-off, Second-row, Loose forward
Club
Years	Team	Pld	T	G	FG	P
1998–08	Featherstone Rovers	271	56	0	0	224
2009–12	Hunslet Hawks	62	7	0	0	28
	Total	333	63	0	0	252

Steve Dooler is a former professional rugby league footballer who played in the 1990s and 2000s. He played at club level for Featherstone Rovers, and Hunslet Hawks, as a centre, stand-off, second-row, or loose forward.

== Playing career ==
Dooler made his début for Featherstone Rovers on Friday 10 April 1998.

=== Testimonial match ===
Dooler's benefit season at Featherstone Rovers took place during the 2006 season.
