= Robert Marchand (athlete) =

French hurdler

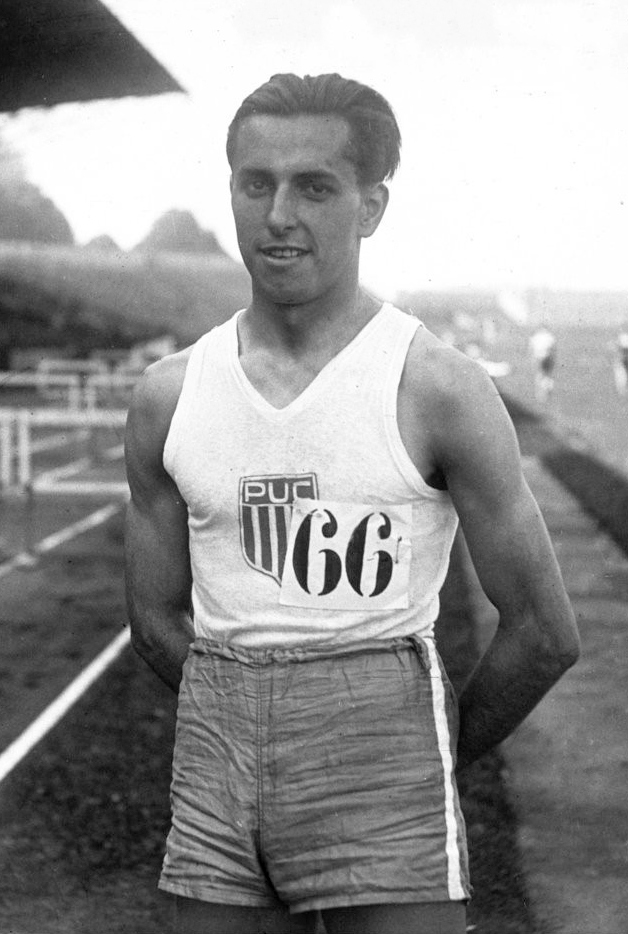
- Robert Marchand in 1928

Personal information
- Born: 18 August 1904 Charbuy, France
- Died: 6 April 1983 (aged 78)

Sport
- Sport: Athletics
- Event: Hurdles
- Club: Paris UC

Achievements and titles
- Personal best: 110 mH – 15.2 (1928)

Robert Pierre René Marchand (18 August 1904 – 6 April 1983) was a French hurdler. He competed in the 110 m event at the 1928 Summer Olympics, but failed to reach the final.
