= Vilko Ukmar =

Slovenian composer

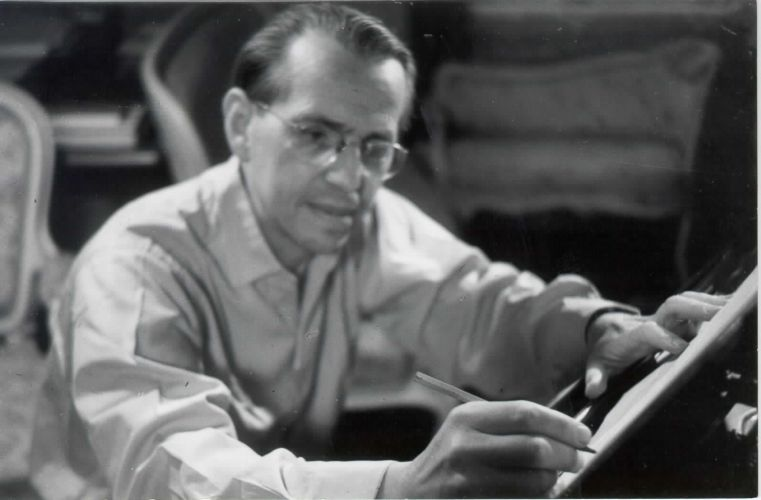
- Born: 10 February 1905; Postojna
- Died: 24 October 1991 (aged 86); Ljubljana
- Citizenship: Slovenia; Yugoslavia; Austria-Hungary
- Occupation: Composer

Vilko Ukmar (10 February 1905, in Postojna – 24 October 1991, in Ljubljana) was a Slovenian composer.

He studied music at the Ljubljana Music Conservatorium, the Academy of Music in Zagreb and Vienna Conservatorium. From 1932 to 1939, he worked as music critic and publisher. Between 1939 and 1945, he served as the director of Ljubljana Opera House. From 1948 to 1974, he taught at the Academy of Music in Ljubljana, and from year 1962 to 1979, he also taught at the Faculty of Arts in Ljubljana.

In year 1967 he received the Prešeren Award for his ballet composition Godec (Musician). He was also honored with the Prešeren Award for Lifetime Achievement in 1985. His music initially drew on romantic music, but later he made transition to Expressionist music and twelve-tone technique.

His son, Kristijan Ukmar, is conductor and music teacher.

== Musical opus ==
- Kitajski slavček (Chinese nightingale), dance pantomime, 1953
- Lepa Vida (Beautiful Vida), ballet, 1957
- Godec (Musician), ballet, 1963
