= José Palhares Costa =

Portuguese hurdler

Personal information
- Nationality: Portuguese
- Born: 22 February 1908 Lisbon, Portugal
- Died: 13 November 1976 (aged 68)

Sport
- Sport: Track and field
- Event: 110 metres hurdles

José Palhares Costa (22 February 1908 – 13 November 1976) was a Portuguese hurdler. He competed in the men's 110 metres hurdles at the 1928 Summer Olympics.
