= Brian J. Dooley =

Irish human rights activist (born 1963)

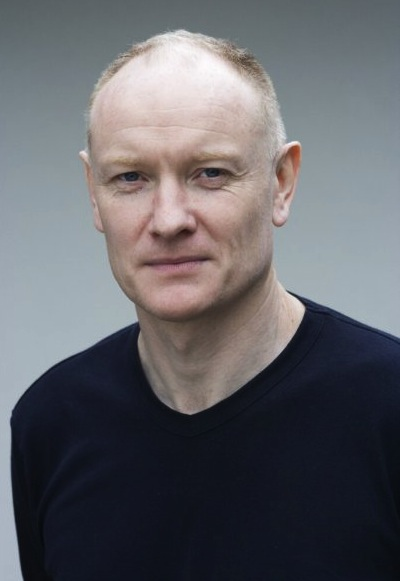
- Born: 1963 (age 62–63)
- Occupation: Human rights activist
- Years active: 1980–present

Brian J. Dooley (born 1963) is an Irish human rights activist and author. He is Senior Advisor at Washington DC–based NGO Human Rights First. He was awarded the 2025 University of Oslo's Human Rights Award. Since 2023 he had been an Honorary Professor of Practice at Queen's University Belfast's Institute for Global Peace, Security and Justice, and is a visiting scholar at University College London (UCL).

From April 2020 to March 2023 he was Senior Advisor to Mary Lawlor, the United Nations Special Rapporteur on the situation of human rights defenders. He is as an advisory board member of the Gulf Centre for Human Rights, and was a visiting scholar at John Jay College, City University of New York from 2022 to 2023, and at Fordham University School of Law in New York from 2019 to 2020.

== Background ==
Dooley works primarily with human rights defenders working in war zones, revolutions and other dangerous environments, engaging with governments and others to end threats to human rights activism.

He is a speaker on human rights issues at government, academic, and think tank events, and has testified at U.S. Congressional hearings and in other parliaments.

For the 20 years prior to joining Human Rights First, Brian worked for U.S., Irish and international NGOs. He writes for and is regularly quoted in international print and broadcast media, including the Washington Post, New York Times, Los Angeles Times, BBC, CNN, Foreign Affairs and Al Jazeera. He wrote around 200 pieces on a range of human rights issues from various countries while a columnist for the Huffington Post from 2011 to 2017. During the 1980s he wrote for the anti-apartheid newspaper the New Nation until it was banned, and during the 1980s and 1990s was a regular literary critic for The Economist, The Guardian, and for The Irish Times.

He led Amnesty International's work on partnering with national NGOs in the global South for many years, and worked as Head of Media for Amnesty International in London and in Dublin, and as director of communications for Public Citizen in Washington, D.C.

He is the author of several books about civil rights and U.S. politics, and had early experience on the Hill, interning for Senator Edward Kennedy in the mid-80s as a legislative researcher, contributing to what ultimately became the 1986 Anti-Apartheid Act.

He lived and worked as an English teacher in a black township in South Africa in 1981 to 1982 in defiance of apartheid's racial segregation laws. Other human rights work included helping establish Baltic Pride marches in 2007 to 2010.

His work for Amnesty International included being on research teams sent to conflicts in Lebanon 2006 and Gaza 2009, and on the ambassador of Conscience Award project for Nelson Mandela in 2005.

Dooley has a PhD in the history of civil rights from the University of East Anglia, an MPhil in Government and Politics from the Open University, and a B.A. with honors in Political Science from the University of East Anglia. He represented The University of East Anglia at cricket and football, the George Washington University in Washington DC at football (soccer), and London Minor GAA (Gaelic football).

In February 2022 The Oxford Middle East Review profiled Dooley on four decades of activism and his approach to human rights work. In January 2024 he described in a piece for Queen's University Belfast the practicalities of researching human rights in war zones in Ukraine.

== Books ==
Dooley has written three books.

"Robert Kennedy: The Final Years" (Edinburgh University Press 1995, St Martin's Press, New York 1996) is a political biography of Bobby Kennedy.

"Black and Green: The Fight for Civil Rights in Northern Ireland & Black America" (Pluto Press, 1998, reissued 2019) traces the historic links between the civil rights movements in Northern Ireland and the US. Artist Helen Cammock featured the book in her installation which won the 2019 Turner Prize. In December 2019 the book was the subject of a 60 minute podcast by Shared Ireland. In March 2025, Dooley was interviewed by U.S. broadcaster Tavis Smiley about the book, also available as a podcast.

"Choosing the Green?"(Beyond the Pale 2004) analyses the part played by the Irish diaspora in the Irish conflict. In September 2019 the History Now TV programme in Northern Ireland ran a 30-minute interview with Dooley about "Choosing the Green?" From January 2020 the digital files of the book have been hosted and available in the Special Collections Archive at the Library of London Metropolitan University.

In October 2026 his book "Defiant, Profiles of Resistance" will be published by HumanitasMedia. Distributed by Simon & Schuster, it tells eleven true stories of people across Europe who became unlikely Human Rights Defenders.

Dooley speaks regularly in the media, at universities, political conferences, and other venues on these and related issues.

== Bahrain ==
Since the Bahraini uprising, Brian has produced a series of reports and articles highly critical of the Bahraini regime which are regularly featured in the international press. A November 2013 report urged the U.S. to change its approach on Bahrain –- Plan B for Bahrain: What the U.S. government should do next. A 2015 report suggested ways the U.S. government could help bring stability through the promotion of human rights in Bahrain. A 2016 report suggested how the US government should drastically alter its relationship with the Gulf kingdom - How to Reverse Five Years of Failure on Bahrain.

He was denied access to Bahrain in January 2012 which promoted members of US Congress to complain to the government of Bahrain. Admitted to Bahrain in March 2012, he has been refused access to the country since, despite repeated requests to enter. In August 2014 Dooley was refused access to Bahrain with U.S. Congressman James McGovern. The continued denial of Dooley's access to Bahrain is documented in the U.S. State Department's Country Reports for 2012, 2013 and 2014.

The Bahrain Ambassador to the US wrote a blog in 2012 criticizing Dooley, entitled "Responding to Brian Dooley's Article in Foreign Policy" and Brian invited the ambassador for a public debate, which was refused. He is also regularly attacked by Bahrain's pro-regime press.

In September 2014 an article he wrote about Bahrain for Defense One was featured by the Washington Post editorial board in a piece on U.S. Imperfect Allies in the Middle East and by the Aspen Institute as a Best Idea of the Day. He was cited again by name in a June 2015 Washington Post editorial Bahrain's Rulers Now Flout the U.S. Openly. Other pieces on Bahrain include February 2016 for the Washington Times, June 2016 for Defense One, July 2016 in Politico, September 2016 for The Hill

In April 2018 he was deported from Bahrain Airport with Danish MP Lars Aslan Rasmussen when they attempted to gain access to Bahrain to visit jailed Danish citizen and human rights defender Abdulhadi Al Khawaja. The Bahraini authorities took their passports on arrival and held them for 24 hours. The incident was widely covered in the Danish, Irish and international media. In November 2018 he wrote a policy briefing for the Project on Middle East Democracy (POMED) "No Applause For Bahrain's Sham Election," which was the subject of a UN Dispatch podcast.

In June 2019 he addressed the United Nations Human Rights Council in Geneva on Bahrain's violations of the rights to free expression and peaceful assembly. In March 2022 he wrote a piece for POMED on the Biden administration's limp response to Bahrain's continuing human rights abuses. In November 2022 he spoke at a U.S. Congressional briefing on Bahrain's sham elections.

== Egypt ==
In March 2013 and May 2013 he authored reports critical of the Morsi government in Egypt and reported from Cairo in August 2013 when the Egyptian government massacred at least 800 protestors.

In January 2014 he was in Cairo reporting on Egypt's constitutional referendum and authored a report on the continuing crackdown on human rights in Egypt which called for an overhaul of U.S. government policy towards Egypt and in December 2014 another report on the fears of Egyptian civil society confronted with a new crackdown. In January 2016 in the run up to the fifth anniversary of Egypt's uprising he visited Egypt and wrote a report and op-ed on the targeting of human rights activists.

In August 2017 he authored a report and op-eds detailing continuing human rights abuses in Egypt, including the radicalization of prisoners by ISIS in Egyptian jails. He recommended the U.S. government cut military aid to Egypt until human rights improved. Three weeks after the report was released the U.S. government announced that for the first time it was cutting military aid to Egypt, denying $60m in military aid and suspending $195m more on human rights grounds. He authored another in September 2018 jointly for Human Rights First and the Cairo Institute for Human Rights Studies, again focused on the issue of US military aid for Egypt.

In February 2019 Dooley produced a report for Human Rights First on the extensive recruitment by ISIS in Egyptian prisons. Based on interviews in Egypt with former prisoners, Like a Fire in a Forest detailed how torture in Egypt's jails drives prisoners seeking revenge to join ISIS.

In July 2021 he wrote a further report on this for Human Rights First. Based on the testimonies of prisoners released from jail in Egypt between 2019 and 2021, Creating Time Bombs documents how ISIS was continuing to recruit new members inside Egypt's prison system. In August 2023 he wrote a report for Human Rights First on the tenth anniversary of the Rabaa massacre, citing the views of Egyptian activists on a decade of U.S. policy failure. In March 2025 he reported from Cairo on how local activists were disappointed with the level of support they were getting from the European Union.

== Hong Kong ==
In September 2019 he authored a report on the unrest in Hong Kong with recommendations for what the US government should do to support those protesting for human rights there, and returned in November 2019, giving a public lecture at the University of Hong Kong on Commissions of Inquiry into Police Behaviour, and writing a piece with Hong Kong barrister Wilson Leung for the Hong Kong Free Press on the need for such a local inquiry. In December 2019 he wrote an op-ed for the Hong Kong Free Press on lessons Hong Kong could learn from the Northern Ireland experience, and another for the same outlet in January 2020 with Francine Chan of the China Human Rights Lawyers Concern Group about challenges faced by human rights lawyers in mainland China and Hong Kong. In June 2020 he co-authored a report with the University of Hong Kong Law School for Human Rights First on the impact of the new security law in Hong Kong.

== Northern Ireland ==
In 2017 he authored a report on the vilification of human rights lawyers in Northern Ireland. In June 2022 he was named as one of the independent international human experts on a panel convened by the Norwegian Centre for Human Rights to investigate the extent of impunity during the Northern Ireland conflict. The expert panel produced a report of their findings in April 2024 called Bitter Legacy: State Impunity in the Northern Ireland Conflict, which concluded that the British government operated a "widespread, systematic, and systemic" practice of impunity that protected security forces from sanction during the conflict in Northern Ireland. In 2022 and 2024 he submitted written testimony to the U.S. Congress Lantos Human Rights Commission on hearings about human rights issues in the Northern Ireland conflict. In 2024 he wrote for Irish America (magazine) on the 50th anniversary of the IRA bombing of pubs in Guildford and Birmingham, and the subsequent miscarriages of justice, and the continuing campaigns for the truth. He is a regular public speaker on human rights issues about Northern Ireland.

== Poland ==
In October 2021 Dooley visited the border area of Poland near Belarus, and produced a briefing on the human rights situation there. In April 2022 he returned and reported from the Poland-Belarus border about how local activists were being targeted for helping refugees arriving via Belarus, and wrote a piece for Just Security on the double standards of the Polish authorities in supporting those who are helping refugees from Ukraine while targeting those helping refugees arriving via Belarus. In June 2023 he returned to the border with Belarus to detail in a report with Maya Fernandez-Powell for Human Rights First further attacks on activists, and also wrote a blog for the Mitchell Institute at Queen's University Belfast on the issue.

In May 2025 he returned to the forest near the border with Belarus and wrote a report about the continuing targeting of activists helping refugees.

== Ukraine ==
2014: Dooley reported on political extremism in Ukraine and on difficulties for civil society during the conflict with Russia and in October 2014 authored a report on what the U.S. government should do to support democracy and human rights in Ukraine.

2017: Dooley authored a Human Rights First report Democracy in Danger, focusing on corruption and attacks on activists. He spoke at a Helsinki Commission event in the US Congress and with activists at the Ukraine Crisis Media Centre in Kyiv about the report, and co-authored an op-ed with local anti-corruption activists Oleksandra Ustinova in Newsweek about the issue.

2022: In March, following the Russian invasion, Dooley brought bulletproof vests and helmets to volunteer medics in Ukraine, and wrote a series of pieces on the views of local Human Rights Defenders.

In May, August and November he filed pieces from Kharkiv

2023: In January, March, May, June, July, August and November he reported from Kharkiv and Kupiansk on a range of human rights issues, including war crimes and corruption.

2024: Throughout the year he produced reports, some with colleague Maya Fernandez-Powell, on human rights activists working at the eastern front of the war.

2025: On repeated trips to the eastern front he reported on the work of activists and joined local volunteers to evacuate civilians from frontline areas.

2026: Returned to the eastern front in January, March, June and July to report on conditions for civilians, and the work of local activists, and to evacuate people from villages under fire.

== Other Human Rights Issues: Palestine, Lebanon, The UAE, Kenya, Guantanamo, Syria, Hungary and Britain ==
Between 2002 and 2010 he was part of Amnesty International teams producing research reports on Palestine, including in 2002 on human rights violations in Jenin and Nablus; on movements restrictions on the Palestinian people in 2003; in 2006 on house demolitions; and in 2009 on Israeli attacks on Gaza, including the use of white phosphorus.

In 2006 he was part of an Amnesty International team in Lebanon during the Israeli-Hezbollah war documenting Israeli air strikes and other attacks on civilian infrastructure. In 2024 and 2025 he researched and wrote reports from Lebanon for the Gulf Centre for Human Rights on attacks on journalists and other Human Rights Defenders during and after the 2023/2024 war.,

In 2015 he reported from the UAE on the suffocation of civil society there on the eve of UEA and other Gulf leaders arriving at Camp David for a summit meeting with President Obama. He authored a report on human rights in the UAE and articles on the summit. In July 2019 he wrote an opinion piece for the Washington Post on how the United Arab Emirates (UAE) was escaping scrutiny for its abysmal human rights record.

In 2015 he also reported from Kenya on the country's efforts to counter violent extremism, and authored a report in advance of the visit of President Obama's visit to Kenya.

In 2015 he observed the Guantanamo hearings of those accused of the September 11, 2001 hijackings, and wrote a series of pieces on the courtroom scenes.

In 2016 he wrote a series of pieces in Foreign Affairs and elsewhere about the Syrian conflict and the role of civil society in the country's politics.

In 2017 and 2018 he authored reports on the rise of the populist right and attacks on civil society in Hungary.

In 2024 he wrote a report for Human Rights First called Easy Targets on the targeting of immigration lawyers in Britain.

== Mandela legacy ==
On the death of Nelson Mandela in December 2013 Dooley provided analysis and media commentary on the legacy of Mandela, including in the New York Times, NPR, Al Jazeera, Huffington Post and various other international media.
