= Otakar Jandera =

Czech hurdler

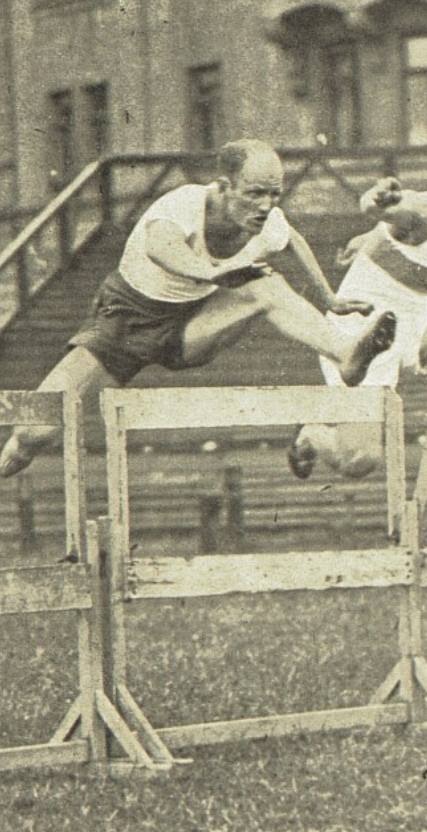

Personal information
- Nationality: Czechoslovak
- Born: 9 January 1898 Kraków, Austria-Hungary
- Died: 25 March 1977 (aged 79) Prague, Czechoslovakia

Sport
- Sport: Track and field
- Event: 110 metres hurdles

Otakar Jandera (9 January 1898 – 25 March 1977) was a Czech hurdler. He competed in the 110 metres hurdles at the 1924 Summer Olympics and the 1928 Summer Olympics.
