= Lau Spel =

Dutch hurdler

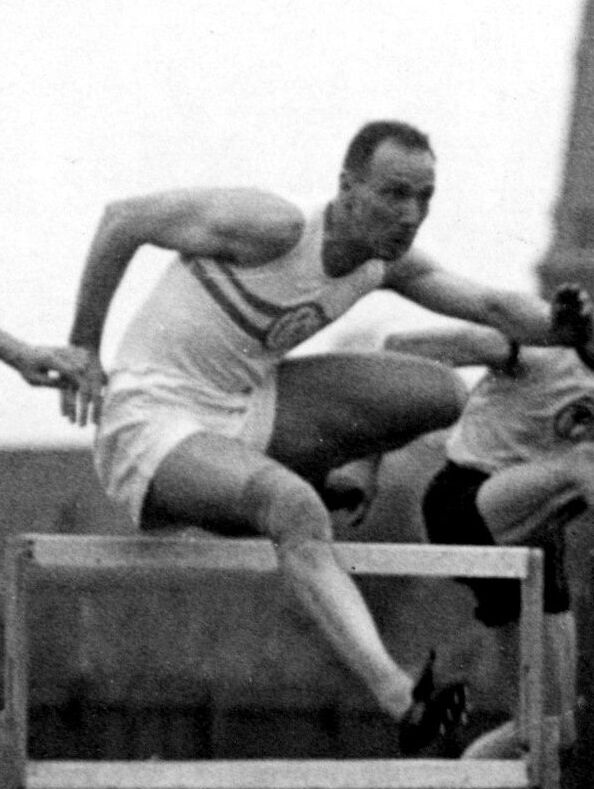
- Lau Spel in 1927

Personal information
- Nationality: Dutch
- Born: 20 July 1900
- Died: 29 December 1979 (aged 79)

Sport
- Sport: Track and field
- Event: 110 metres hurdles

Lau Spel (20 July 1900 – 29 December 1979) was a Dutch hurdler. He competed in the 110 metres hurdles at the 1924 Summer Olympics and the 1928 Summer Olympics.
