= George Guthrie (hurdler) =

American hurdler (1904–1972)

George Phineas Guthrie, Jr. (March 13, 1904 – June 1, 1972) was an American track and field athlete who competed in the 1924 Summer Olympics. He was born in Elyria, Ohio and died in Columbus, Ohio. In 1924 he was disqualified in the 110 metre hurdles final at the Paris Games. He finished third in this race but was disqualified when he knocked down three hurdles, which was forbidden by the rules in force at that time.

Guthrie (representing Ohio State) won the high hurdle race at the 1925 Drake Relays in 14.8 seconds.
