= Jean Schmit (footballer) =

Luxembourgish footballer

Personal information
- Date of birth: 27 April 1915
- Date of death: 29 October 1991 (aged 76)
- Position: Defender

International career
Years	Team	Apps	(Gls)
1936	Luxembourg	2	(0)

Jean Schmit (27 April 1915 – 29 October 1991) was a Luxembourgish footballer. He played in two matches for the Luxembourg national football team in 1936. He was also part of Luxembourg's squad for the football tournament at the 1936 Summer Olympics, but he did not play in any matches.
