= Steve Anderson (hurdler) =

American hurdler (1906–1988)

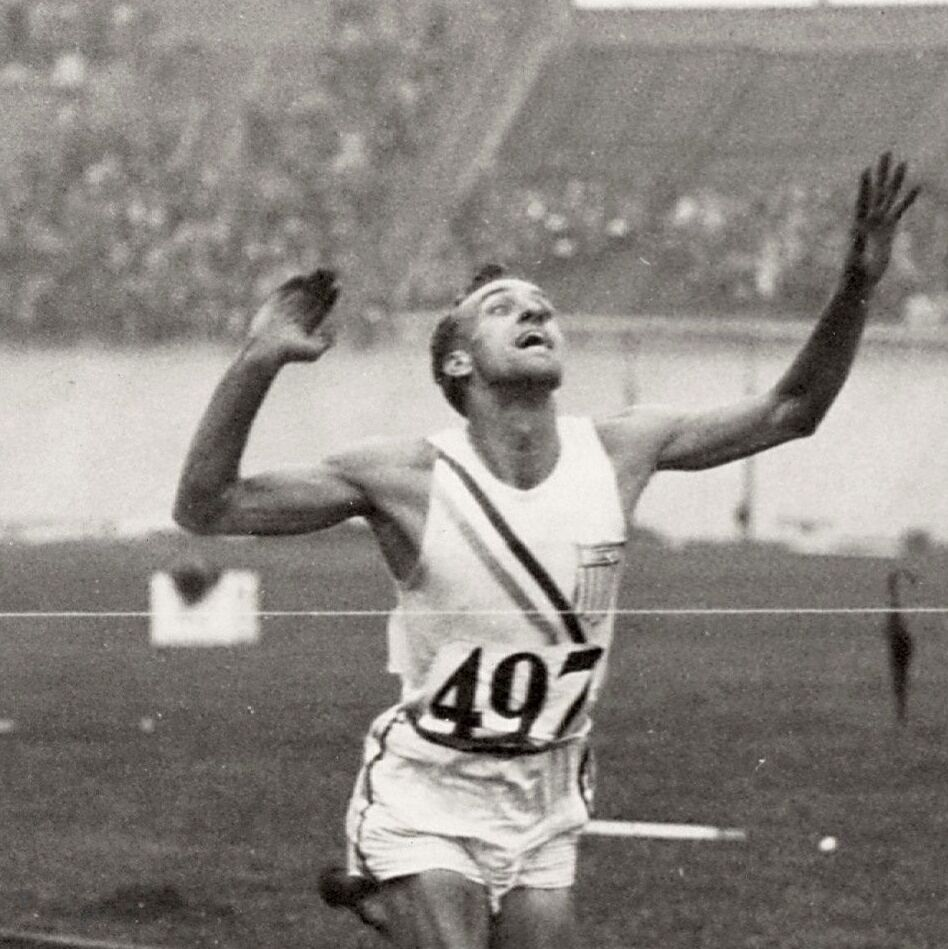

Medal record

Men's athletics

Representing the United States

Olympic Games
Silver medal – second place	1928 Amsterdam	110 metre hurdles

Stephen Eugene Anderson (April 10, 1906 – August 2, 1988) was an American track and field athlete who competed mainly in the 110 meter hurdles.

He competed for the United States in the 1928 Summer Olympics held in Amsterdam, Netherlands in the 110 metre hurdles where he won the silver medal.

Matched the world record in the 110 metre hurdles at the U.S. Olympic trials in Boston with a time of 14.8 seconds on July 7, 1928.

Competing for the Washington Huskies track and field team, Anderson won multiple NCAA titles in the sprint hurdles.
