= John M. Dooley =

American football player (1897–1991)

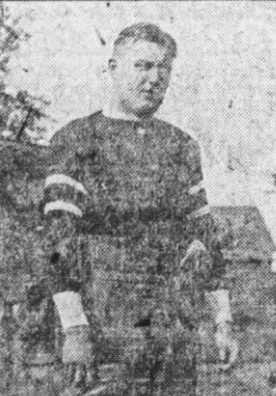

Profile
- Positions: Tackle, guard

Personal information
- Born: September 29, 1897; Fairmount, New York, U.S.
- Died: October 31, 1991 (aged 94); Syracuse, New York, U.S.
- Listed height: 6 ft 1 in (1.85 m)
- Listed weight: 224 lb (102 kg)

Career information
- High school: Solvay (NY)
- College: Syracuse, Bucknell

Career history
- Rochester Jeffersons (1922, 1924–1925); Milwaukee Badgers (1923)
- Stats at Pro Football Reference

John M. Dooley (September 29, 1897 – October 31, 1991) was an American football tackle and guard. He played college football for Syracuse and Bucknell and in the National Football League (NFL) for the Rochester Jeffersons in 1922 and 1924 to 1925 and for the Milwaukee Badgers in 1923. He appeared in 17 NFL games. He also played for the Jeffersons prior to 1920, when they were a semi-pro team.
