= Men's 4 × 100 metres relay world record progression =

The first world record in the 4 × 100 metres relay for men (athletics) was recognized by the International Amateur Athletics Federation, now known as World Athletics, in 1912.

To June 21, 2009, the IAAF has ratified 35 world records in the event.

The following table shows the world record progression in the men's 4 × 100 metre relay, as ratified by the IAAF. "y" denotes time for 4 × 110 yards (402.34 m), ratified as a record for this event.

== Records 1912–1976 ==
Time	Auto	Team	Nationality	Location of race	Date	Participants
42.3		Germany	Germany	Stockholm, Sweden	1912-07-08	Otto Röhr; Max Herrmann; Erwin Kern; Richard Rau
42.2		United States	United States	Antwerp, Belgium	1920-08-22	Jackson Scholz; Loren Murchison; Morris Kirksey; Charley Paddock
42.0		Great Britain	United Kingdom	Paris, France	1924-07-12	Harold Abrahams; Walter Rangeley; Lancelot Royle; Wilfred Nichol
42.0		Netherlands	Netherlands	Paris, France	1924-07-12	Jaap Boot; Harry Broos; Jan de Vries; Rinus van den Berge
41.0		United States	United States	Paris, France	1924-07-13	Frank Hussey; Louis Clarke; Loren Murchison; Alfred LeConey
41.0y		Newark A.C. (Johnny Gibson)	United States	Lincoln, United States	1927-07-04	Chester Bowman; John Currie; James Pappas; Henry Cummings
41.0		Eintracht Frankfurt	Germany	Halle, Germany	1928-06-10	Ernst Geerling; Friedrich-Wilhelm Wichmann; Adolf Metzner; Hans Salz
41.0		United States	United States	Amsterdam, Netherlands	1928-08-05	Frank Wykoff; James Quinn; Charles Borah; Henry Russell
41.0		Germany	Germany	Berlin, Germany	1928-09-02	Arthur Jonath; Richard Corts; Hubert Houben; Helmut Körnig
40.8		S.C. Charlottenburg	Germany	Breslau, Germany	1929-07-22	Helmut Körnig; Wilhelm Grosser; Alex Natan; Hermann Schlöske
40.8y		University of Southern California	United States	Fresno, United States	1931-05-09	Roy Delby; Milton Maurer; Maurice Guyer; Frank Wykoff
40.6		Germany	Germany	Kassel, Germany	1932-06-14	Helmut Körnig; Georg Lammers; Erich Borchmeyer; Arthur Jonath
40.0	40.10	United States	United States	Los Angeles, United States	1932-08-07	Bob Kiesel; Emmett Toppino; Hector Dyer; Frank Wykoff
39.8		United States	United States	Berlin, Germany	1936-08-09	Jesse Owens; Ralph Metcalfe; Foy Draper; Frank Wykoff
39.5	39.60	United States	United States	Melbourne, Australia	1956-12-01	Ira Murchison; Leamon King; Thane Baker; Bobby Morrow
39.5		Federal Republic of Germany	West Germany	Cologne, West Germany	1958-08-29	Manfred Steinbach; Martin Lauer; Heinz Fütterer; Manfred Germar
39.5	39.61	Unified Team of Germany	Germany	Rome, Italy	1960-09-07	Bernd Cullmann; Armin Hary; Walter Mahlendorf; Martin Lauer
39.5	39.66	Unified Team of Germany	Germany	Rome, Italy	1960-09-08	Bernd Cullmann; Armin Hary; Walter Mahlendorf; Martin Lauer
39.1		United States	United States	Moscow, Soviet Union	1961-07-15	Hayes Jones; Frank Budd; Charles Frazier; Paul Drayton
39.0	39.06	United States	United States	Tokyo, Japan	1964-10-21	Paul Drayton; Gerry Ashworth; Richard Stebbins; Bob Hayes
38.6y		University of Southern California	United States/Jamaica (Note: Mixed-nationality teams were subsequently prohibited from setting IAAF world records)	Provo, United States	1967-06-17	Earl McCullouch; Fred Kuller; O. J. Simpson; Lennox Miller (All USA except Miller)
38.6	38.65	Jamaica	Jamaica	Mexico City, Mexico	1968-10-19	Errol Stewart; Michael Fray; Clifton Forbes; Lennox Miller
38.3	38.39	Jamaica	Jamaica	Mexico City, Mexico	1968-10-19	Errol Stewart; Michael Fray; Clifton Forbes; Lennox Miller
38.2	38.24	United States	United States	Mexico City, Mexico	1968-10-20	Charles Greene; Mel Pender; Ronnie Ray Smith; Jim Hines
38.2	38.19	United States	United States	Munich, West Germany	1972-09-10	Larry Black; Robert Taylor; Gerald Tinker; Eddie Hart

== Records since 1977 ==
Key to tables: Time rescinded Retrospectively ratified

From 1975 onwards, the IAAF (now World Athletics) accepted separate automatically electronically timed records for events up to 400 metres. Starting January 1, 1977, the IAAF required fully automatic timing to the hundredth of a second for these events.

The United States relay team's 1972 Olympic gold medal victory time of 38.19 was the fastest recorded result to that time.

Time	Team	Nationality	Location	Date	Ref	Event	Participants
38.19	United States	United States	Munich, West Germany	1972-09-10		1972 Olympic Games Final	Larry Black; Robert Taylor; Gerald Tinker; Eddie Hart
38.03	United States	United States	Düsseldorf, West Germany	1977-09-03		1977 IAAF World Cup	Bill Collins; Steve Riddick; Cliff Wiley; Steve Williams
37.86	United States	United States	Helsinki, Finland	1983-08-10		1983 World Championships Final	Emmit King, Willie Gault, Calvin Smith, Carl Lewis
37.83	United States	United States	Los Angeles, United States	1984-08-11		1984 Olympic Games Final	Sam Graddy; Ron Brown; Calvin Smith; Carl Lewis
37.79	France	France	Split, Yugoslavia	1990-09-01		1990 European Championships	Max Morinière; Daniel Sangouma; Jean-Charles Trouabal; Bruno Marie-Rose
37.79	Santa Monica Track Club	United States	Monte Carlo, Monaco	1991-08-03		1991 Herculis	Michael Marsh; Leroy Burrell; Floyd Heard; Carl Lewis
37.67	United States 1	United States	Zurich, Switzerland	1991-08-07		1991 Weltklasse Zürich	Michael Marsh; Leroy Burrell; Dennis Mitchell; Carl Lewis
37.50	United States	United States	Tokyo, Japan	1991-09-01		1991 World Championships Final	Andre Cason; Leroy Burrell; Dennis Mitchell; Carl Lewis
37.40	United States	United States	Barcelona, Spain	1992-08-08		1992 Olympic Games	Michael Marsh; Leroy Burrell; Dennis Mitchell; Carl Lewis
37.40	United States	United States	Stuttgart, Germany	1993-08-21		1993 World Championships Semi-Final	Jon Drummond; Andre Cason; Dennis Mitchell; Leroy Burrell
37.10	Jamaica	Jamaica	Beijing, China	2008-08-22		2008 Olympic Games Final	Nesta Carter; Michael Frater; Usain Bolt; Asafa Powell
37.31	Jamaica	Jamaica	Berlin, Germany	2009-08-22		2009 World Championships Final	Steve Mullings; Michael Frater; Usain Bolt; Asafa Powell
37.04	Jamaica	Jamaica	Daegu, South Korea	2011-09-04		2011 World Championships Final	Nesta Carter; Michael Frater; Yohan Blake; Usain Bolt
36.84	Jamaica	Jamaica	London, United Kingdom	2012-08-11		2012 Olympic Games Final	Nesta Carter; Michael Frater; Yohan Blake; Usain Bolt

== T42-T46/T61–64 Class ==
The T42-T46 4 × 100 m relay is run by athletes with a disability.

Class	Time	Team	Nationality	Date	Meet	Place	Ref.
T42–47	42.50	Oscar Pistorius; Arnu Fourie; Zivan Smith; Samkelo Radebe	South Africa	17 March 2012	Yellow Pages Series	Johannesburg, South Africa	
T42–47	41.78	Oscar Pistorius; Arnu Fourie; Zivan Smith; Samkelo Radebe	South Africa	5 September 2012	Paralympic Games	London, United Kingdom	
T42–47	40.73	Jerome Singleton (T44); Blake Leeper (T43); Jarryd Wallace (T44); Richard Browne (T44)	United States	27 July 2013	IPC World Championships	Lyon, France	
T42–47/T61–64	40.52	Grolla; Streng; Floors; Rehm	Germany	1 July 2022		Leverkusen, Germany	
