= Athletics at the 1924 Summer Olympics – Men's 4 × 100 metres relay =

Men's 4 × 100 metres relay at the Games of the VIII Olympiad
- Venue: Stade Olympique Yves-du-Manoir
- Dates: July 12, 1924 (quarterfinals); July 13, 1924 (semifinals and final)
- Competitors: 60 from 15 nations

Medalists
1st place, gold medalist(s)		Clarke, Hussey, LeConey, Murchison; United States
2nd place, silver medalist(s)		Abrahams, Nichol, Rangeley, Royle; Great Britain
3rd place, bronze medalist(s)		van den Berge, Boot, Broos, de Vries; Netherlands

The men's 4 × 100 metres relay event was part of the track and field athletics programme at the 1924 Summer Olympics. It was the third appearance of this event. The competition was held on Saturday, July 12, 1924, and on Sunday, July 13, 1924.

As for all other events the track was 500 metres in circumference.

Sixty runners from 15 nations competed.

== Records ==
These were the standing world and Olympic records (in seconds) prior to the 1924 Summer Olympics.

World record	42.2	(United States) Charley Paddock (United States) Jackson Scholz (United States) Loren Murchison (United States) Morris Kirksey	Antwerp (BEL)	August 22, 1920
Olympic record	42.2	(United States) Charley Paddock (United States) Jackson Scholz (United States) Loren Murchison (United States) Morris Kirksey	Antwerp (BEL)	August 22, 1920

In the first heat the team of the Great Britain set a new world record with 42.0 seconds. This record was equalized in the third heat by the team of the Netherlands. In the sixth heat the American team bettered the world record with a time of 41.2 seconds. On the next day they improved their own record to 41.0 seconds.

== Results ==
=== Round 1 ===
The heats were held on Saturday, July 12, 1924. The top two in each heat qualified for the semi-finals.

Heat 1

Place	Athletes	Time	Qual.
1	Harold Abrahams, Wilfred Nichol, Walter Rangeley, Lancelot Royle (GBR)	42.0	Q WR
2	Argyris Karagiannis, Konstantinos Pantelidis, Alexandros Papafingos, Ioannis Talianos (GRE)	46.1	Q

Heat 2

Place	Athletes	Time	Qual.
1	Lawrence Beets, George Dustan, Howard Kinsman, Christiaan Steyn (RSA)	42.8	Q
2	Larry Armstrong, Cyril Coaffee, George Hester, Anthony Vince (CAN)	43.0	Q
3	José María Larrabeiti, Juan Junquera, Félix Mendizábal, Diego Ordóñez (ESP)	44.2	

Heat 3

Place	Athletes	Time	Qual.
1	Jaap Boot, Harry Broos, Jan de Vries, Rinus van den Berge (NED)	42.0	Q =WR
2	Ferenc Gerő, Lajos Kurunczy, László Muskát, Gusztáv Rózsahegyi (HUN)	42.6	Q
3	Väinö Eskola, Reijo Halme, Lauri Härö, Anton Husgafval (FIN)	42.6	

Heat 4

Place	Athletes	Time	Qual.
1	Karl Borner, Heinz Hemmi, Josef Imbach, Victor Moriaud (SUI)	42.2	Q
2	Ernesto Bonacina, Giovanni Frangipane, Pietro Pastorino, Enrico Torre (ITA)	42.8	Q
3	Otto Diesch, Félix Escobar, Guillermo Newberry, Camilo Rivas (ARG)	44.0	

Heat 5

Place	Athletes	Time	Qual.
1	Kurt Branting, Nils Engdahl, Thor Österdahl, Curt Wiberg (SWE)	43.8	Q
2	Kaj Jensen, Poul Schiang, Henri Thorsen, Mogens Truelsen (DEN)	44.0	Q

Heat 6

Place	Athletes	Time	Qual.
1	Louis Clarke, Frank Hussey, Alfred LeConey, Loren Murchison (USA)	41.2	Q WR
2	Maurice Degrelle, Albert Heise, André Mourlon, René Mourlon (FRA)	44.5	Q

=== Semifinals ===
The semifinals were held on Sunday, July 13, 1924. The top two in each heat qualified for the final.

Semifinal 1

Place	Athletes	Time	Qual.
1	Louis Clarke, Frank Hussey, Alfred LeConey, Loren Murchison (USA)	41.0	Q WR
2	Karl Borner, Heinz Hemmi, Josef Imbach, Victor Moriaud (SUI)	42.2	Q
3	Larry Armstrong, Cyril Coaffee, George Hester, Anthony Vince (CAN)	43.3	
4	Argyris Karagiannis, Konstantinos Pantelidis, Alexandros Papafingos, Ioannis Talianos (GRE)	45.2	

Semifinal 2

Place	Athletes	Time	Qual.
1	Harold Abrahams, Wilfred Nichol, Walter Rangeley, Lancelot Royle (GBR)	41.8	Q
2	Ferenc Gerő, Lajos Kurunczy, László Muskát, Gusztáv Rózsahegyi (HUN)	42.4	Q
3	Ernesto Bonacina, Giovanni Frangipane, Pietro Pastorino, Enrico Torre (ITA)	42.9	
4	Kaj Jensen, Poul Schiang, Henri Thorsen, Mogens Truelsen (DEN)	43.8	

Semifinal 3

Place	Athletes	Time	Qual.
1	Jaap Boot, Harry Broos, Jan de Vries, Rinus van den Berge (NED)	42.2	Q
2	Maurice Degrelle, Albert Heise, André Mourlon, René Mourlon (FRA)	42.5	Q
3	Kurt Branting, Nils Engdahl, Thor Österdahl, Curt Wiberg (SWE)	43.0	
4	Lawrence Beets, George Dustan, Howard Kinsman, Christiaan Steyn (RSA)	43.6	

=== Final ===
The final was held on Sunday, July 13, 1924.

Place	Athletes	Time
1	Frank Hussey, Louis Clarke, Alfred LeConey, Loren Murchison (USA)	41.0 =WR
2	Harold Abrahams, Wilfred Nichol, Walter Rangeley, Lancelot Royle (GBR)	41.2
3	Jaap Boot, Harry Broos, Jan de Vries, Rinus van den Berge (NED)	41.8
4	Ferenc Gerő, Lajos Kurunczy, László Muskát, Gusztáv Rózsahegyi (HUN)	42.0
5	Maurice Degrelle, Albert Heise, André Mourlon, René Mourlon (FRA)	42.2
—	Karl Borner, Heinz Hemmi, Josef Imbach, Victor Moriaud (SUI)	DSQ
