= 4 × 100 metres relay =

Track and field relay event covering 400 metres

Athletics 4 × 100 metres relay
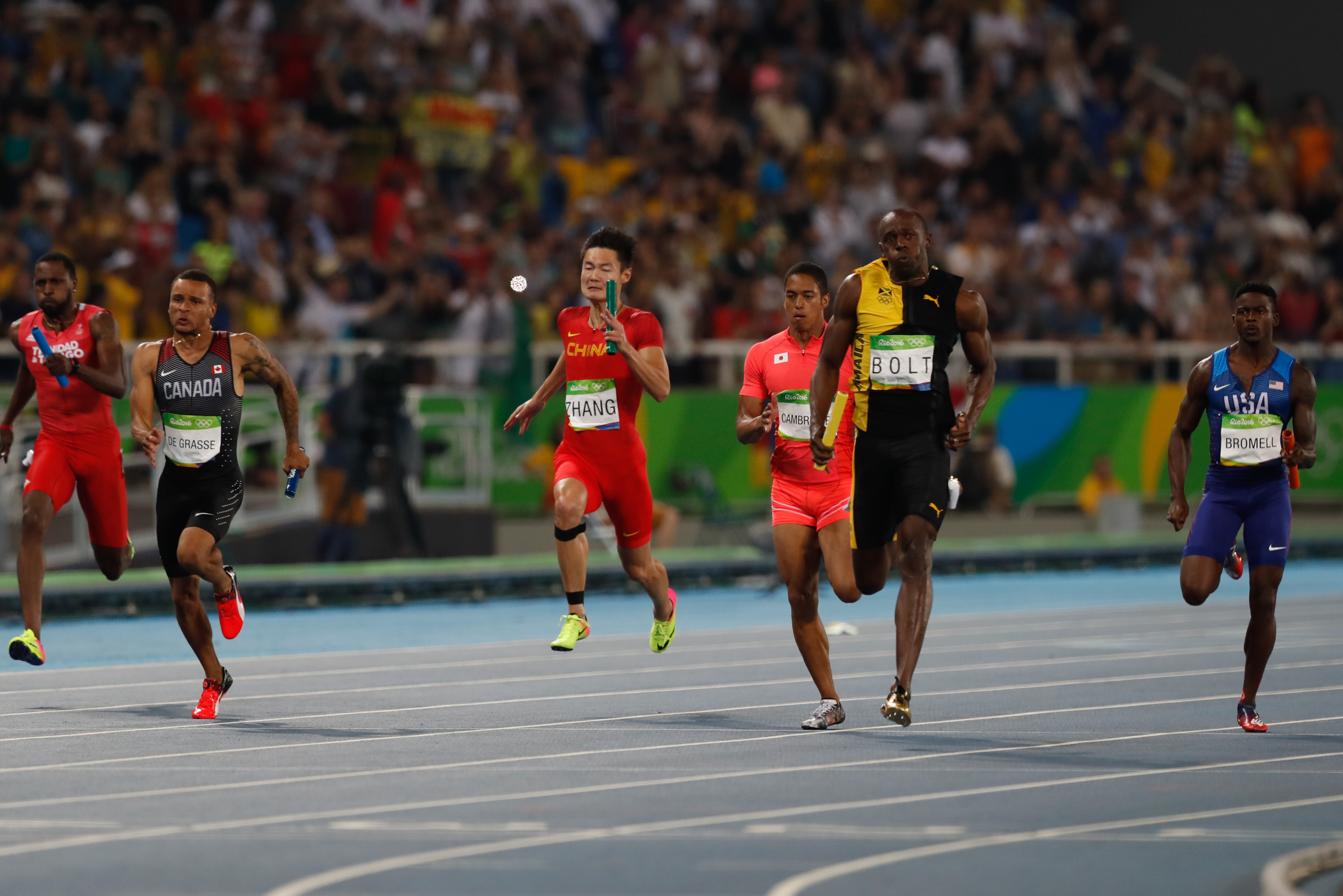
- The finish at the Rio 2016 Olympics

World records
- Men: Jamaica (Nesta Carter, Michael Frater, Yohan Blake, Usain Bolt) 36.84 (2012)
- Women: United States (Tianna Bartoletta, Allyson Felix, Bianca Knight, Carmelita Jeter) 40.82 (2012)

Olympic records
- Men: Jamaica (Nesta Carter, Michael Frater, Yohan Blake, Usain Bolt) 36.84 (2012)
- Women: United States (Tianna Bartoletta, Allyson Felix, Bianca Knight, Carmelita Jeter) 40.82 (2012)

World Championship records
- Men: Jamaica (Nesta Carter, Michael Frater, Yohan Blake, Usain Bolt) 37.04 (2011)
- Women: United States (Tamari Davis, Twanisha Terry, Gabby Thomas, Sha'Carri Richardson) 41.03 (2023)

The 4 × 100 metres relay or sprint relay is an athletics track event run in lanes over one lap of the track with four runners completing 100 metres each. The first runners must begin in the same stagger as for the individual 400 m race. Each runner carries a relay baton.

Before 2018, the baton had to be passed within a 20 m changeover box, preceded by a 10-metre acceleration zone. With a rule change effective November 1, 2017, that zone was modified to include the acceleration zone as part of the passing zone, making the entire zone 30 metres in length. The outgoing runner cannot touch the baton until it has entered the zone, and the incoming runner cannot touch it after it has left the zone. The zone is usually marked in yellow, frequently using lines, triangles or chevrons. While the rule book specifies the exact positioning of the marks, the colours and style are only "recommended". While most legacy tracks will still have the older markings, the rule change still uses existing marks. Not all governing body jurisdictions have adopted the rule change.

The transfer of the baton in this race is typically blind. The outgoing runner reaches a straight arm backwards when entering the changeover box or when the incoming runner makes a verbal signal. The outgoing runner does not look back, and it is the responsibility of the incoming runner to thrust the baton into the outstretched hand and not let go until the outgoing runner takes hold of it without crossing the changeover box and stops after the baton is exchanged. Runners on the first and third legs typically run on the inside of the lane with the baton in their right hand, while runners on the second and fourth legs take the baton in their left. Polished handovers can compensate for lack of basic speed to some extent, and disqualification for dropping the baton or failing to transfer it within the box is common, even at the highest level. Relay times are typically 2–3 seconds faster than the sum of best times of individual runners.

The United States men and women historically dominated this event through the 20th century, winning Olympic gold medals and the most IAAF/World Athletics championships. Carl Lewis ran the anchor leg on U.S. relay teams that set six world records from 1983 to 1992, including the first team to break 38 seconds.

The current men's world record stands at 36.84, set by the Jamaican team at the final of the 2012 London Olympic Games on 11 August 2012. As the only team to break 37 seconds to date, Jamaica became the dominant team in the sport, winning two consecutive Olympic Gold Medals and four consecutive World Championships. The Jamaican team also set the previous record of 37.04 seconds at the 2011 World Championships.

The fastest electronically timed anchor leg run is 8.65 seconds by Usain Bolt at the 2015 IAAF World Relays, while Bob Hayes was hand-timed as running 8.7 seconds on a cinder track in the 1964 Tokyo Games Final. The Tokyo Games also had electronic timing. High-speed modern video analysis shows his time to be a more realistic 8.95-9.0 seconds in the final, a much more consistent time relative to his Fully Automatic Timing 10.06 s 100 m world record and more in line with the usual +0.25 s-0.3 s hand time to FAT conversion.

The women's world record stands at 40.82 seconds, set by the United States in 2012 at the London Olympics. The fastest anchor leg run by a woman was run by Christine Arron of France, timed unofficially at 9.67 s. According to the IAAF rules, world records in relays can only be set if all team members have the same nationality.

== History ==
=== From the beginnings to the first official world record ===
If on the European continent the metric system is the one almost exclusively used (4 × 100 metres, or a lap of 400 m), where the imperial system is still used (UK, USA and Australia, mainly) this relay was rather ran over the distance of 4 × 110 yards, a total of 402.34 m, and that, until the late 1960s. The runway at Hayward Field was shortened to 400 m only in 1987.

Paradoxically, the first race recognized as certain, without however being an official world record, dates back to 1897, shortly after the creation, on 8 May, of the Česká amatérská atletická unie (ČAAU). On June 26 of that year, during Sparta's 5th match in Prague, the organizing team, AC Sparta Praha, defeated MAC Budapest, in 48 1/5 seconds.

Unlike the "long" 4 × 400 m relay, whose origins are clearly American, because it derives from the 4 × 440 yards, the 4 × 100 m relay is therefore of European origin. The Scandinavians, in particular, have introduced this new specialty into their programmes, in the hope of being able to play a decisive role in it.

Before World War I, this foundation period of the relay was gradually enhanced by various German or Swedish teams (such as AIK Stockholm), until the semi-finals of the Stockholm Olympic Games (1912) where this event made its Olympic appearance:

- in the 1st semi-final, the Great Britain team (consisting of David Jacobs, Henry Macintosh, Victor d'Arcy, and William Applegarth) reached 43 seconds 0 tenths (43 s) for the first time, behind the Americans who had finished in 42 seconds 5, but who were disqualified for passing the baton out of the area;
- in the second semifinal, the Swedish team (Ivan Möller, Charles Luther, Ture Person and Knut Lindberg) took this record to 42 s 5, ahead of Hungary in 42 s 9.

These two runs have not been recognized by the IAAF as the first world records, despite their official nature. The first officially recognized world record for the fast relay is that of the German team, which on 8 July 1912, during the 3rd semifinal, runs in 42 seconds 3 tenths. The team consisted of Otto Röhr, Max Herrmann, Erwin Kern, and Richard Rau. In the final Great Britain, despite having finished second again, behind the favorites and the new world record holders, still won the gold medal, due to the loss of the German baton. Sweden is second in 42 s 6. The bronze medal is not awarded, because the Americans, still clumsy in passing the baton, were also downgraded. The German record in the semifinal (42"3) will remain the best result of the year. In 1913 it will be recognized by the newly formed IAAF as the first official world record of the specialty.

After this first Olympic event, in addition to the 4 × 400 m relay, the 4 × 100 m relay established itself as a classic Olympic event and will always remain on the programme, first for men, then extended to women. The two relays undergo little transformation over time. However, since 1926, the baton bearer has to remain in the baton transmission area, which is 20 m long. It wasn't until 1963 that the rules were relaxed: a 10 m run-up zone, before this zone, allowed him to better tackle the run-up.

== Area records ==
- Updated 22 May 2026.

Area	Men				Women			
Area	Time (s)	Season	Athletes	Team	Time (s)	Season	Athletes	Team
World	36.84	2012	Nesta Carter, Michael Frater, Yohan Blake, Usain Bolt	Jamaica	40.82	2012	Tianna Bartoletta, Allyson Felix, Bianca Knight, Carmelita Jeter	United States
Area records
Africa (records)	37.49	2026	Mvuyo Moss, Cheswill Johnson, Bradley Nkoana, Akani Simbine	South Africa	41.90	2023	Murielle Ahouré-Demps, Marie Josée Ta Lou, Jessika Gbai, Maboundou Koné	Ivory Coast
Asia (records)	37.43	2019	Shuhei Tada, Kirara Shiraishi, Yoshihide Kiryū, Abdul Hakim Sani Brown	Japan	42.23	1997	Xiao Lin, Li Yali, Liu Xiaomei, Li Xuemei	Sichuan (China)
Europe (records)	37.36	2019	Adam Gemili, Zharnel Hughes, Richard Kilty, Nethaneel Mitchell-Blake	Great Britain	41.37	1985	Silke Möller, Sabine Rieger, Ingrid Auerswald-Lange, Marlies Göhr	East Germany
North, Central America and Caribbean (records)	36.84	2012	Nesta Carter, Michael Frater, Yohan Blake, Usain Bolt	Jamaica	40.82	2012	Tianna Madison, Allyson Felix, Bianca Knight, Carmelita Jeter	United States
Oceania (records)	37.87	2025	Lachlan Kennedy, Joshua Azzopardi, Christopher Ius, Calab Law	Australia	42.48	2024	Ella Connolly, Bree Masters, Kristie Edwards, Torrie Lewis	Australia
Oceania (records)	37.87	2026	Lachlan Kennedy, Joshua Azzopardi, Christopher Ius, Rohan Browning	Australia	42.48	2024	Ella Connolly, Bree Masters, Kristie Edwards, Torrie Lewis	Australia
South America (records)	37.72	2019	Rodrigo do Nascimento, Vitor Hugo dos Santos, Derick Silva, Paulo André de Oliveira	Brazil	42.29	2013	Evelyn dos Santos, Ana Cláudia Lemos, Franciela Krasucki, Rosângela Santos	Brazil

== All-time top 10 by country ==
Key to tables: Not ratified or later rescinded
X = annulled due to doping violation

=== Men ===
- Updated May 2026

Rank	Time	Team	Nation	Date	Place	Ref.
1	36.84	Nesta Carter, Michael Frater, Yohan Blake, Usain Bolt	Jamaica	11 August 2012	London	
2
2	37.04 X	Trell Kimmons, Justin Gatlin, Tyson Gay, Ryan Bailey	United States	11 August 2012	London	
2	37.10	Christian Coleman, Justin Gatlin, Mike Rodgers, Noah Lyles	United States	5 October 2019	Doha	
3	37.36	Adam Gemili, Zharnel Hughes, Richard Kilty, Nethaneel Mitchell-Blake	Great Britain	5 October 2019	Doha	
4	37.43	Shuhei Tada, Kirara Shiraishi, Yoshihide Kiryu, Abdul Hakim Sani Brown	Japan	5 October 2019	Doha	
5	37.48	Aaron Brown, Jerome Blake, Brendon Rodney, Andre De Grasse	Canada	23 July 2022	Eugene	
6	37.49	Bayanda Walaza, Shaun Maswanganyi, Bradley Nkoana, Akani Simbine	South Africa	3 May 2026	Gaborone	
7	37.50	Lorenzo Patta, Marcell Jacobs, Fausto Desalu, Filippo Tortu	Italy	6 August 2021	Tokyo	
8	37.62	Darrel Brown, Marc Burns, Emmanuel Callander, Richard Thompson	Trinidad and Tobago	22 August 2009	Berlin	
9	37.67	Kevin Kranz, Marvin Schulte, Owen Ansah, Lucas Ansah-Peprah	Germany	2 May 2026	Gaborone	
10	37.72	Rodrigo do Nascimento, Vitor Hugo dos Santos, Derick Silva, Paulo André de Oliveira	Brazil	5 October 2019	Doha	

=== Women ===
- Correct as of August 2023

Rank	Time	Team	Nation	Date	Place	Ref.
1	40.82	Tianna Madison, Allyson Felix, Bianca Knight, Carmelita Jeter	United States	10 August 2012	London	
2	41.02	Briana Williams, Elaine Thompson-Herah, Shelly-Ann Fraser-Pryce, Shericka Jackson	Jamaica	6 August 2021	Tokyo	
3	41.37	Silke Gladisch-Möller, Sabine Rieger-Günther, Ingrid Auerswald-Lange, Marlies Göhr	German Democratic Republic	6 October 1985	Canberra	
4	41.49	Olga Bogoslovskaya, Galina Malchugina, Natalya Voronova, Irina Privalova	Russia	22 August 1993	Stuttgart	
5	41.55	Asha Philip, Imani Lansiquot, Dina Asher-Smith, Daryll Neita	Great Britain	5 August 2021	Tokyo	
5	41.55	Dina Asher-Smith, Imani Lansiquot, Amy Hunt, Daryll Neita	Great Britain	20 July 2024	London	
6	41.62	Tatjana Pinto, Lisa Mayer, Gina Lückenkemper, Rebekka Haase	Germany	29 July 2016	Mannheim	
7	41.78	Patricia Girard, Muriel Hurtis-Houairi, Sylviane Félix, Christine Arron	France	30 August 2003	Paris	
8	41.90	Murielle Ahouré-Demps, Marie Josée Ta Lou, Jessika Gbai, Maboundou Koné	Ivory Coast	25 August 2023	Budapest	
9	41.92	Savatheda Fynes, Chandra Sturrup, Pauline Davis-Thompson, Debbie Ferguson	Bahamas	29 August 1999	Sevilla	
10	42.00	Antonina Pobyubko, Natalya Voronova, Marina Zhirova, Elvira Barbashina	Soviet Union	17 August 1985	Moscow	

== All-time top 25 ==
=== Men ===
- Updated September 2025

Rank	Time	Team	Nation	Date	Place	Ref.
1	36.84	Nesta Carter; Michael Frater; Yohan Blake; Usain Bolt	Jamaica	11 August 2012	London	
2	37.04	Nesta Carter; Michael Frater; Yohan Blake; Usain Bolt	Jamaica	4 September 2011	Daegu	
2	37.04 X	Trell Kimmons; Justin Gatlin; Tyson Gay; Ryan Bailey	United States	11 August 2012	London	
3
3	37.10 X	Nesta Carter; Michael Frater; Usain Bolt; Asafa Powell	Jamaica	22 August 2008	Beijing	
3	37.10	Christian Coleman; Justin Gatlin; Michael Rodgers; Noah Lyles	United States	5 October 2019	Doha	
4	37.27	Asafa Powell; Yohan Blake; Nickel Ashmeade; Usain Bolt	Jamaica	19 August 2016	Rio de Janeiro	
5	37.29	Christian Coleman; Kenny Bednarek; Courtney Lindsey; Noah Lyles	United States	21 September 2025	Tokyo	
6	37.31	Steve Mullings; Michael Frater; Usain Bolt; Asafa Powell	Jamaica	22 August 2009	Berlin	
7	37.36	Nesta Carter; Kemar Bailey-Cole; Nickel Ashmeade; Usain Bolt	Jamaica	18 August 2013	Moscow	
7	37.36	Nesta Carter; Asafa Powell; Nickel Ashmeade; Usain Bolt	Jamaica	29 August 2015	Beijing	
7	37.36	Adam Gemili; Zharnel Hughes; Richard Kilty; Nethaneel Mitchell-Blake	Great Britain	5 October 2019	Doha	
10
10	37.38 X	Jeff Demps; Darvis Patton; Trell Kimmons; Justin Gatlin	United States	10 August 2012	London	
10	37.38	Mike Rodgers; Justin Gatlin; Tyson Gay; Ryan Bailey	United States	2 May 2015	Nassau	
10	37.38	Christian Coleman; Fred Kerley; Brandon Carnes; Noah Lyles	United States	26 August 2023	Budapest	
12	37.39	Nesta Carter; Michael Frater; Yohan Blake; Kemar Bailey-Cole	Jamaica	10 August 2012	London	
13	37.40	Michael Marsh; Leroy Burrell; Dennis Mitchell; Carl Lewis	United States	8 August 1992	Barcelona	
13	37.40	Jon Drummond; Andre Cason; Dennis Mitchell; Leroy Burrell	United States	21 August 1993	Stuttgart	
13	37.40	Courtney Lindsey; Kenny Bednarek; Kyree King; Noah Lyles	United States	5 May 2024	Nassau	
16	37.41	Nesta Carter; Asafa Powell; Rasheed Dwyer; Nickel Ashmeade	Jamaica	29 August 2015	Beijing	
17	37.43	Shuhei Tada; Kirara Shiraishi; Yoshihide Kiryu; Abdul Hakim Sani Brown	Japan	5 October 2019	Doha	
17	37.43	Ronnie Baker; Max Thomas; Lance Lang; Pjai Austin	United States	3 May 2026	Gaborone	
19	37.45	Trell Kimmons; Wallace Spearmon; Tyson Gay; Mike Rodgers	United States	19 August 2010	Zürich	
20	37.46	Daniel Bailey; Yohan Blake; Mario Forsythe; Usain Bolt	Antigua and Barbuda; Jamaica; Jamaica; Jamaica	25 July 2009	London	
21	37.47	Chijindu Ujah; Adam Gemili; Danny Talbot; Nethaneel Mitchell-Blake	Great Britain	12 August 2017	London	
22	37.48	Jon Drummond; Andre Cason; Dennis Mitchell; Leroy Burrell	United States	22 August 1993	Stuttgart	
22	37.48	Aaron Brown; Jerome Blake; Brendon Rodney; Andre De Grasse	Canada	23 July 2022	Eugene	
24	37.49	Courtney Lindsey; Kenny Bednarek; Kyree King; Noah Lyles	United States	4 May 2024	Nassau	
24	37.49	Bayanda Walaza; Shaun Maswanganyi; Bradley Nkoana; Akani Simbine	South Africa	3 May 2026	Gaborone	

Note:

- A USA team ran 37.04 in London in 2012 but the performance was annulled due to use of performance-enhancing drugs by Tyson Gay
- A Jamaican team ran 37.10 in Beijing in 2008 but the performance was annulled due to use of performance-enhancing drugs by Nesta Carter
- A USA team ran 37.38 in the heats in London in 2012 but the performance was retrospectively disqualified following drug test failure by Tyson Gay, even though Gay only ran in the final and not the heat.

=== Women ===
- Correct as of July 2024

Rank	Time	Team	Nationality	Date	Place	Ref.
1	40.82	Tianna Bartoletta; Allyson Felix; Bianca Knight; Carmelita Jeter	United States	10 August 2012	London	
2	41.01	Tianna Bartoletta; Allyson Felix; English Gardner; Tori Bowie	United States	19 August 2016	Rio de Janeiro	
3	41.02	Briana Williams; Elaine Thompson-Herah; Shelly-Ann Fraser-Pryce; Shericka Jackson	Jamaica	6 August 2021	Tokyo	
4	41.03	Tamari Davis; Twanisha Terry; Gabrielle Thomas; Sha'Carri Richardson	United States	26 August 2023	Budapest	
5	41.07	Veronica Campbell-Brown; Natasha Morrison; Elaine Thompson; Shelly-Ann Fraser-Pryce	Jamaica	29 August 2015	Beijing	
6	41.14	Melissa Jefferson; Abby Steiner; Jenna Prandini; Twanisha Terry	United States	23 July 2022	Eugene	
7	41.18	Kemba Nelson; Elaine Thompson-Herah; Shelly-Ann Fraser-Pryce; Shericka Jackson	Jamaica	23 July 2022	Eugene	
8	41.21	Natasha Morrison; Shelly-Ann Fraser-Pryce; Shashalee Forbes; Shericka Jackson	Jamaica	26 August 2023	Budapest	
9	41.29	Carrie Russell; Kerron Stewart; Schillonie Calvert; Shelly-Ann Fraser-Pryce	Jamaica	18 August 2013	Moscow	
10	41.36	Christania Williams; Elaine Thompson; Veronica Campbell-Brown; Shelly-Ann Fraser-Pryce	Jamaica	19 August 2016	Rio de Janeiro	
11	41.37	Silke Gladisch-Möller; Sabine Rieger-Günther; Ingrid Auerswald-Lange; Marlies Göhr	German Democratic Republic	6 October 1985	Canberra	
12	41.41	Shelly-Ann Fraser-Pryce; Sherone Simpson; Veronica Campbell-Brown; Kerron Stewart	Jamaica	10 August 2012	London	
13	41.44	Natalliah Whyte; Shelly-Ann Fraser-Pryce; Jonielle Smith; Shericka Jackson	Jamaica	5 October 2019	Doha	
14	41.45	Javianne Oliver; Teahna Daniels; Jenna Prandini; Gabrielle Thomas	United States	6 August 2021	Tokyo	
15	41.47	Chryste Gaines; Marion Jones; Inger Miller; Gail Devers	United States	9 August 1997	Athens	
16	41.49	Olga Bogoslovskaya; Galina Malchugina; Natalya Pomoshchnikova-Voronova; Irina Privalova	Russia	22 August 1993	Stuttgart	
16	41.49	Michelle Finn-Burrell; Gwen Torrence; Wendy Vereen; Gail Devers	United States	22 August 1993	Stuttgart	
18	41.52	Chryste Gaines; Marion Jones; Inger Miller; Gail Devers	United States	8 August 1997	Athens	
19	41.53	Silke Gladisch-Möller; Marita Koch; Ingrid Auerswald-Lange; Marlies Göhr	German Democratic Republic	31 July 1983	Berlin	
20	41.55	Alice Brown; Diane Williams; Florence Griffith Joyner; Pam Marshall	United States	21 August 1987	Berlin	
20	41.55	Asha Philip; Imani Lansiquot; Dina Asher-Smith; Daryll Neita	Great Britain	5 August 2021	Tokyo	
20	41.55	Texas Longhorns; Julien Alfred; Ezinne Abba; Rhasidat Adeleke; Kevona Davis	St. Lucia; United States; Ireland; Jamaica	8 June 2023	Austin	
20	41.55	Dina Asher-Smith; Imani Lansiquot; Amy Hunt; Daryll Neita	Great Britain	20 July 2024	London	
24	41.56	Bianca Knight; Allyson Felix; Marshevet Myers; Carmelita Jeter	United States	4 September 2011	Daegu	
24	41.56	Melissa Jefferson; Aleia Hobbs; Jenna Prandini; Twanisha Terry	United States	22 July 2022	Eugene	

== Olympic Games medalists ==
=== Men ===
Games	Gold	Silver	Bronze
1912 Stockholm	Great Britain; David Jacobs; Henry Macintosh; Victor d'Arcy; Willie Applegarth	Sweden; Ivan Möller; Charles Luther; Ture Persson; Knut Lindberg	none awarded
1920 Antwerp	United States; Charley Paddock; Jackson Scholz; Loren Murchison; Morris Kirksey	France; René Lorain; René Tirard; René Mourlon; Émile Ali-Khan	Sweden; Agne Holmström; William Petersson; Sven Malm; Nils Sandström
1924 Paris	United States; Loren Murchison; Louis Clarke; Frank Hussey; Al LeConey	Great Britain; Harold Abrahams; Walter Rangeley; Wilfred Nichol; Lancelot Royle	Netherlands; Jan de Vries; Jaap Boot; Harry Broos; Rinus van den Berge
1928 Amsterdam	United States; Frank Wykoff; James Quinn; Charley Borah; Henry Russell	Germany; Georg Lammers; Richard Corts; Hubert Houben; Helmut Körnig	Great Britain; Cyril Gill; Edward Smouha; Walter Rangeley; Jack London
1932 Los Angeles	United States; Bob Kiesel; Emmett Toppino; Hector Dyer; Frank Wykoff	Germany; Helmut Körnig; Friedrich Hendrix; Erich Borchmeyer; Arthur Jonath	Italy; Giuseppe Castelli; Ruggero Maregatti; Gabriele Salviati; Edgardo Toetti
1936 Berlin	United States; Jesse Owens; Ralph Metcalfe; Foy Draper; Frank Wykoff	Italy; Orazio Mariani; Gianni Caldana; Elio Ragni; Tullio Gonnelli	Germany; Wilhelm Leichum; Erich Borchmeyer; Erwin Gillmeister; Gerd Hornberger
1948 London	United States; Barney Ewell; Lorenzo Wright; Harrison Dillard; Mel Patton	Great Britain; Jack Archer; Jack Gregory; Alastair McCorquodale; Kenneth Jones	Italy; Michele Tito; Enrico Perucconi; Antonio Siddi; Carlo Monti
1952 Helsinki	United States; Dean Smith; Harrison Dillard; Lindy Remigino; Andy Stanfield	Soviet Union; Boris Tokarev; Levan Kalyayev; Levan Sanadze; Vladimir Sukharev	Hungary; László Zarándi; Géza Varasdi; György Csányi; Béla Goldoványi
1956 Melbourne	United States; Ira Murchison; Leamon King; Thane Baker; Bobby Morrow	Soviet Union; Leonid Bartenyev; Boris Tokarev; Yuriy Konovalov; Vladimir Sukharev	United Team of Germany; Lothar Knörzer; Leonhard Pohl; Heinz Fütterer; Manfred Germar
1960 Rome	United Team of Germany; Bernd Cullmann; Armin Hary; Walter Mahlendorf; Martin Lauer	Soviet Union; Gusman Kosanov; Leonid Bartenyev; Yuriy Konovalov; Edvin Ozolin	Great Britain; Peter Radford; David Jones; David Segal; Nick Whitehead
1964 Tokyo	United States; Paul Drayton; Gerry Ashworth; Richard Stebbins; Bob Hayes	Poland; Andrzej Zieliński; Wiesław Maniak; Marian Foik; Marian Dudziak	France; Paul Genevay; Bernard Laidebeur; Claude Piquemal; Jocelyn Delecour
1968 Mexico City	United States; Charles Greene; Mel Pender; Ronnie Ray Smith; Jim Hines	Cuba; Hermes Ramírez; Juan Morales; Pablo Montes; Enrique Figuerola	France; Gérard Fenouil; Jocelyn Delecour; Claude Piquemal; Roger Bambuck
1972 Munich	United States; Larry Black; Robert Taylor; Gerald Tinker; Eddie Hart	Soviet Union; Aleksandr Kornelyuk; Vladimir Lovetskiy; Juris Silovs; Valeriy Borzov	West Germany; Jobst Hirscht; Karlheinz Klotz; Gerhard Wucherer; Klaus Ehl
1976 Montreal	United States; Harvey Glance; Lam Jones; Millard Hampton; Steve Riddick	East Germany; Manfred Kokot; Jörg Pfeifer; Klaus-Dieter Kurrat; Alexander Thieme	Soviet Union; Aleksandr Aksinin; Nikolay Kolesnikov; Juris Silovs; Valeriy Borzov
1980 Moscow	Soviet Union; Vladimir Muravyov; Nikolay Sidorov; Aleksandr Aksinin; Andrey Prokofyev	Poland; Krzysztof Zwoliński; Zenon Licznerski; Leszek Dunecki; Marian Woronin	France; Antoine Richard; Pascal Barré; Patrick Barré; Hermann Panzo
1984 Los Angeles	United States; Sam Graddy; Ron Brown; Calvin Smith; Carl Lewis	Jamaica; Albert Lawrence; Greg Meghoo; Don Quarrie; Ray Stewart	Canada; Ben Johnson; Tony Sharpe; Desai Williams; Sterling Hinds
1988 Seoul	Soviet Union; Viktor Bryzhin; Vladimir Krylov; Vladimir Muravyov; Vitaliy Savin	Great Britain; Elliot Bunney; John Regis; Mike McFarlane; Linford Christie	France; Bruno Marie-Rose; Daniel Sangouma; Gilles Quénéhervé; Max Morinière
1992 Barcelona	United States; Michael Marsh; Leroy Burrell; Dennis Mitchell; Carl Lewis; James Jett*	Nigeria; Oluyemi Kayode; Chidi Imoh; Olapade Adeniken; Davidson Ezinwa; Osmond Ezinwa*	Cuba; Andrés Simón; Joel Lamela; Joel Isasi; Jorge Aguilera
1996 Atlanta	Canada; Robert Esmie; Glenroy Gilbert; Bruny Surin; Donovan Bailey; Carlton Chambers*	United States; Jon Drummond; Tim Harden; Michael Marsh; Dennis Mitchell; Tim Montgomery*	Brazil; Arnaldo da Silva; Robson da Silva; Édson Ribeiro; André Domingos
2000 Sydney	United States; Jon Drummond; Bernard Williams; Brian Lewis; Maurice Greene; Tim Montgomery*; Kenny Brokenburr*	Brazil; Vicente de Lima; Édson Ribeiro; André Domingos; Claudinei da Silva; Cláudio Roberto Souza	Cuba; José Ángel César; Luis Alberto Pérez-Rionda; Ivan García; Freddy Mayola
2004 Athens	Great Britain; Jason Gardener; Darren Campbell; Marlon Devonish; Mark Lewis-Francis	United States; Shawn Crawford; Justin Gatlin; Coby Miller; Maurice Greene; Darvis Patton*	Nigeria; Olusoji Fasuba; Uchenna Emedolu; Aaron Egbele; Deji Aliu
2008 Beijing	Trinidad and Tobago; Keston Bledman; Marc Burns; Emmanuel Callender; Richard Thompson; Aaron Armstrong*	Japan; Naoki Tsukahara; Shingo Suetsugu; Shinji Takahira; Nobuharu Asahara	Brazil; Vicente de Lima; Sandro Viana; Bruno de Barros; José Carlos Moreira
2012 London	Jamaica; Nesta Carter; Michael Frater; Yohan Blake; Usain Bolt; Kemar Bailey-Cole*	Trinidad and Tobago; Richard Thompson; Marc Burns; Emmanuel Callender; Keston Bledman	France; Jimmy Vicaut; Christophe Lemaitre; Pierre-Alexis Pessonneaux; Ronald Pognon
2016 Rio de Janeiro	Jamaica; Asafa Powell; Yohan Blake; Nickel Ashmeade; Usain Bolt; Jevaughn Minzie*; Kemar Bailey-Cole*	Japan; Ryota Yamagata; Shōta Iizuka; Yoshihide Kiryū; Asuka Cambridge	Canada; Akeem Haynes; Aaron Brown; Brendon Rodney; Andre De Grasse; Bolade Ajomale*
2020 Tokyo	Italy; Lorenzo Patta; Marcell Jacobs; Fausto Desalu; Filippo Tortu	Canada; Aaron Brown; Jerome Blake; Brendon Rodney; Andre De Grasse	China; Tang Xingqiang; Xie Zhenye; Su Bingtian; Wu Zhiqiang
2024 Paris	Canada; Aaron Brown; Jerome Blake; Brendon Rodney; Andre De Grasse	South Africa; Bayanda Walaza; Shaun Maswanganyi; Bradley Nkoana; Akani Simbine	Great Britain; Jeremiah Azu; Louie Hinchliffe; Nethaneel Mitchell-Blake; Zharnel Hughes; Richard Kilty*
2028 Los Angeles			

Note: * Indicates athletes who ran in preliminary rounds and also received medals.

=== Women ===
Games	Gold	Silver	Bronze
1928 Amsterdam	Canada; Fanny Rosenfeld; Ethel Smith; Jane Bell; Myrtle Cook	United States; Mary Washburn; Jessie Cross; Loretta McNeil; Betty Robinson	Germany; Rosa Kellner; Leni Schmidt; Anni Holdmann; Leni Junker
1932 Los Angeles	United States; Mary Carew; Evelyn Furtsch; Annette Rogers; Wilhelmina von Bremen	Canada; Mildred Fizzell; Lillian Palmer; Mary Frizzell; Hilda Strike	Great Britain; Eileen Hiscock; Gwendoline Porter; Violet Webb; Nellie Halstead
1936 Berlin	United States; Harriet Bland; Annette Rogers; Betty Robinson; Helen Stephens	Great Britain; Eileen Hiscock; Violet Olney; Audrey Brown; Barbara Burke	Canada; Dorothy Brookshaw; Jeanette Dolson; Hilda Cameron; Aileen Meagher
1948 London	Netherlands; Xenia Stad-de Jong; Netti Witziers-Timmer; Gerda van der Kade-Koudijs; Fanny Blankers-Koen	Australia; Shirley Strickland; June Maston; Betty McKinnon; Joyce King	Canada; Viola Myers; Nancy Mackay; Diane Foster; Patricia Jones
1952 Helsinki	United States; Mae Faggs; Barbara Jones; Janet Moreau; Catherine Hardy	Germany; Ursula Knab; Maria Sander; Helga Klein; Marga Petersen	Great Britain; Sylvia Cheeseman; June Foulds; Jean Pickering; Heather Armitage
1956 Melbourne	Australia; Shirley Strickland de la Hunty; Norma Croker; Fleur Mellor; Betty Cuthbert	Great Britain; Anne Pashley; Jean Scrivens; June Foulds; Heather Armitage	United States; Mae Faggs; Margaret Matthews; Wilma Rudolph; Isabelle Daniels
1960 Rome	United States; Martha Hudson; Lucinda Williams; Barbara Jones; Wilma Rudolph	United Team of Germany; Martha Langbein; Anni Biechl; Brunhilde Hendrix; Jutta Heine	Poland; Teresa Wieczorek; Barbara Sobotta; Celina Jesionowska; Halina Richter
1964 Tokyo	Poland; Teresa Ciepły; Irena Kirszenstein; Halina Górecka; Ewa Kłobukowska	United States; Willye White; Wyomia Tyus; Marilyn White; Edith McGuire	Great Britain; Janet Simpson; Mary Rand; Daphne Arden; Dorothy Hyman
1968 Mexico City	United States; Barbara Ferrell; Margaret Bailes; Mildrette Netter; Wyomia Tyus	Cuba; Marlene Elejarde; Fulgencia Romay; Violetta Quesada; Miguelina Cobián	Soviet Union; Lyudmila Zharkova; Galina Bukharina; Vera Popkova; Lyudmila Samotyosova
1972 Munich	West Germany; Christiane Krause; Ingrid Mickler-Becker; Annegret Richter; Heide Rosendahl	East Germany; Evelin Kaufer; Christina Heinich; Bärbel Struppert; Renate Stecher	Cuba; Marlene Elejarde; Carmen Valdés; Fulgencia Romay; Silvia Chivás
1976 Montreal	East Germany; Marlies Oelsner; Renate Stecher; Carla Bodendorf; Bärbel Eckert	West Germany; Elvira Possekel; Inge Helten; Annegret Richter; Annegret Kroniger	Soviet Union; Tatyana Prorochenko; Lyudmila Maslakova; Nadezhda Besfamilnaya; Vera Anisimova
1980 Moscow	East Germany; Romy Müller; Bärbel Wöckel; Ingrid Auerswald; Marlies Göhr	Soviet Union; Vera Komisova; Lyudmila Maslakova; Vera Anisimova; Natalya Bochina	Great Britain; Heather Oakes; Kathy Smallwood-Cook; Beverley Goddard; Sonia Lannaman
1984 Los Angeles	United States; Alice Brown; Jeanette Bolden; Chandra Cheeseborough; Evelyn Ashford	Canada; Angela Bailey; Marita Payne; Angella Taylor-Issajenko; France Gareau	Great Britain; Simmone Jacobs; Kathy Smallwood-Cook; Beverley Callander; Heather Oakes
1988 Seoul	United States; Alice Brown; Sheila Echols; Florence Griffith Joyner; Evelyn Ashford; Dannette Young*	East Germany; Silke Möller; Kerstin Behrendt; Ingrid Auerswald; Marlies Göhr	Soviet Union; Lyudmila Kondratyeva; Galina Malchugina; Marina Zhirova; Natalya Pomoschnikova; Maia Azarashvili*
1992 Barcelona	United States; Evelyn Ashford; Esther Jones; Carlette Guidry; Gwen Torrence; Michelle Finn*	Unified Team; Olga Bogoslovskaya; Galina Malchugina; Marina Trandenkova; Irina Privalova	Nigeria; Beatrice Utondu; Faith Idehen; Christy Opara-Thompson; Mary Onyali-Omagbemi
1996 Atlanta	United States; Gail Devers; Inger Miller; Chryste Gaines; Gwen Torrence; Carlette Guidry*	Bahamas; Eldece Clarke; Chandra Sturrup; Savatheda Fynes; Pauline Davis-Thompson; Debbie Ferguson*	Jamaica; Michelle Freeman; Juliet Cuthbert; Nikole Mitchell; Merlene Ottey; Gillian Russell*; Andria Lloyd*
2000 Sydney	Bahamas; Savatheda Fynes; Chandra Sturrup; Pauline Davis-Thompson; Debbie Ferguson; Eldece Clarke-Lewis*	Jamaica; Tayna Lawrence; Veronica Campbell; Beverly McDonald; Merlene Ottey; Merlene Frazer*	United States; Chryste Gaines; Torri Edwards; Nanceen Perry; ~~Marion Jones~~^{[nb]} Passion Richardson*
2004 Athens	Jamaica; Tayna Lawrence; Sherone Simpson; Aleen Bailey; Veronica Campbell; Beverly McDonald*	Russia; Olga Stulneva; Yuliya Tabakova; Irina Khabarova; Larisa Kruglova	France; Véronique Mang; Muriel Hurtis-Houairi; Sylviane Félix; Christine Arron
2008 Beijing	Belgium; Kim Gevaert; Élodie Ouédraogo; Hanna Mariën; Olivia Borlée	Nigeria; Halimat Ismaila; Oludamola Osayomi; Agnes Osazuwa; Gloria Kemasuode; Ene Franca Idoko*	Brazil; Rosemar Coelho Neto; Lucimar de Moura; Thaissa Presti; Rosângela Santos
2012 London	United States; Tianna Madison; Allyson Felix; Bianca Knight; Carmelita Jeter; Jeneba Tarmoh*; Lauryn Williams*	Jamaica; Shelly-Ann Fraser-Pryce; Sherone Simpson; Veronica Campbell-Brown; Kerron Stewart; Samantha Henry-Robinson*; Schillonie Calvert*	Ukraine; Olesya Povh; Khrystyna Stuy; Mariya Ryemyen; Yelyzaveta Bryzhina
2016 Rio de Janeiro	United States; Tianna Bartoletta; Allyson Felix; English Gardner; Tori Bowie; Morolake Akinosun*	Jamaica; Christania Williams; Elaine Thompson; Veronica Campbell-Brown; Shelly-Ann Fraser-Pryce; Simone Facey*; Shashalee Forbes*	Great Britain; Asha Philip; Desirèe Henry; Dina Asher-Smith; Daryll Neita
2020 Tokyo	Jamaica; Briana Williams; Elaine Thompson-Herah; Shelly-Ann Fraser-Pryce; Shericka Jackson; Natasha Morrison*; Remona Burchell*	United States; Javianne Oliver; Teahna Daniels; Jenna Prandini; Gabby Thomas; English Gardner*; Aleia Hobbs*	Great Britain; Asha Philip; Imani Lansiquot; Dina Asher-Smith; Daryll Neita
2024 Paris	United States; Melissa Jefferson; Twanisha Terry; Gabby Thomas; Sha'Carri Richardson	Great Britain; Dina Asher-Smith; Imani Lansiquot; Amy Hunt; Daryll Neita; Bianca Williams*; Desirèe Henry*	Germany; Alexandra Burghardt; Lisa Mayer; Gina Lückenkemper; Rebekka Haase; Sophia Junk*
2028 Los Angeles			

Note: * Indicates athletes who ran in preliminary rounds and also received medals.

- ^{nb} Note: Marion Jones was stripped of all her Olympic medals.
- In 2008 the Russian team of Evgeniya Polyakova, Aleksandra Fedoriva, Yulia Gushchina, and Yuliya Chermoshanskaya were initially awarded the gold medals. However, the medals were rescinded in 2016 following disqualification of Chermoshanskaya for use of performance-enhancing drugs.

== World Championships medalists ==
=== Men ===
Championships	Gold	Silver	Bronze
1983 Helsinki	United States (USA); Emmit King; Willie Gault; Calvin Smith; Carl Lewis	Italy (ITA); Stefano Tilli; Carlo Simionato; Pierfrancesco Pavoni; Pietro Mennea	Soviet Union (URS); Andrey Prokofyev; Nikolay Sidorov; Vladimir Muravyov; Viktor Bryzhin
1987 Rome	United States (USA); Lee McRae; Lee Vernon McNeill; Harvey Glance; Carl Lewis	Soviet Union (URS); Aleksandr Yevgenyev; Viktor Bryzhin; Vladimir Muravyov; Vladimir Krylov	Jamaica (JAM); John Mair; Andrew Smith; Clive Wright; Ray Stewart
1991 Tokyo	United States (USA); Andre Cason; Leroy Burrell; Dennis Mitchell; Carl Lewis	France (FRA); Max Morinière; Daniel Sangouma; Jean-Charles Trouabal; Bruno Marie-Rose	Great Britain (GBR); Tony Jarrett; John Regis; Darren Braithwaite; Linford Christie
1993 Stuttgart	United States (USA); Jon Drummond; Andre Cason; Dennis Mitchell; Leroy Burrell; Calvin Smith*	Great Britain (GBR); Colin Jackson; Tony Jarrett; John Regis; Linford Christie; Jason John*; Darren Braithwaite*	Canada (CAN); Robert Esmie; Glenroy Gilbert; Bruny Surin; Atlee Mahorn
1995 Gothenburg	Canada (CAN); Donovan Bailey; Robert Esmie; Glenroy Gilbert; Bruny Surin	Australia (AUS); Paul Henderson; Tim Jackson; Steve Brimacombe; Damien Marsh	Italy (ITA); Giovanni Puggioni; Ezio Madonia; Angelo Cipolloni; Sandro Floris
1997 Athens	Canada (CAN); Robert Esmie; Glenroy Gilbert; Bruny Surin; Donovan Bailey; Carlton Chambers*	Nigeria (NGR); Osmond Ezinwa; Olapade Adeniken; Francis Obikwelu; Davidson Ezinwa	Great Britain (GBR); Darren Braithwaite; Darren Campbell; Douglas Walker; Julian Golding; Dwain Chambers*
1999 Seville^{[4x100m dq1]}	United States (USA); Jon Drummond; Tim Montgomery; Brian Lewis; Maurice Greene	Great Britain (GBR); Jason Gardener; Darren Campbell; Marlon Devonish; Dwain Chambers; Allyn Condon*	Brazil (BRA); Raphael de Oliveira; Claudinei da Silva; Édson Ribeiro; André Domingos
2001 Edmonton^{[4x100m dq2]}	South Africa (RSA); Morné Nagel; Corné du Plessis; Lee-Roy Newton; Matthew Quinn	Trinidad and Tobago (TRI); Marc Burns; Ato Boldon; Jacey Harper; Darrel Brown	Australia (AUS); Matt Shirvington; Paul Di Bella; Steve Brimacombe; Adam Basil
2003 Saint-Denis^{[4x100m dq3]}	United States (USA); John Capel Jr. Bernard Williams; Darvis Patton; Joshua J. Johnson	Brazil (BRA); Vicente de Lima; Édson Ribeiro; André Domingos; Cláudio Roberto Souza	Netherlands (NED); Timothy Beck; Troy Douglas; Patrick van Balkom; Caimin Douglas; Guus Hoogmoed*
2005 Helsinki	France (FRA); Ladji Doucouré; Ronald Pognon; Eddy De Lépine; Lueyi Dovy; Oudéré Kankarafou*	Trinidad and Tobago (TRI); Kevon Pierre; Marc Burns; Jacey Harper; Darrel Brown	Great Britain (GBR); Jason Gardener; Marlon Devonish; Christian Malcolm; Mark Lewis-Francis
2007 Osaka	United States (USA); Darvis Patton; Wallace Spearmon; Tyson Gay; Leroy Dixon; Rodney Martin*	Jamaica (JAM); Marvin Anderson; Usain Bolt; Nesta Carter; Asafa Powell; Dwight Thomas*; Steve Mullings*	Great Britain (GBR); Christian Malcolm; Craig Pickering; Marlon Devonish; Mark Lewis-Francis
2009 Berlin	Jamaica (JAM); Steve Mullings; Michael Frater; Usain Bolt; Asafa Powell; Dwight Thomas*; Lerone Clarke*	Trinidad and Tobago (TRI); Darrel Brown; Marc Burns; Emmanuel Callender; Richard Thompson; Keston Bledman*	Great Britain (GBR); Simeon Williamson; Tyrone Edgar; Marlon Devonish; Harry Aikines-Aryeetey
2011 Daegu	Jamaica (JAM); Nesta Carter; Michael Frater; Yohan Blake; Usain Bolt; Dexter Lee*	France (FRA); Teddy Tinmar; Christophe Lemaitre; Yannick Lesourd; Jimmy Vicaut	Saint Kitts and Nevis (SKN); Jason Rogers; Kim Collins; Antoine Adams; Brijesh Lawrence
2013 Moscow	Jamaica (JAM); Nesta Carter; Kemar Bailey-Cole; Nickel Ashmeade; Usain Bolt; Warren Weir*; Oshane Bailey*	United States (USA); Charles Silmon; Mike Rodgers; Mookie Salaam; Justin Gatlin	Canada (CAN); Gavin Smellie; Aaron Brown; Dontae Richards-Kwok; Justyn Warner
2015 Beijing	Jamaica (JAM); Nesta Carter; Asafa Powell; Nickel Ashmeade; Usain Bolt; Rasheed Dwyer*	China (CHN); Mo Youxue; Xie Zhenye; Su Bingtian; Zhang Peimeng	Canada (CAN); Aaron Brown; Andre De Grasse; Brendon Rodney; Justyn Warner
2017 London	Great Britain (GBR); Chijindu Ujah; Adam Gemili; Danny Talbot; Nethaneel Mitchell-Blake	United States (USA); Mike Rodgers; Justin Gatlin; Jaylen Bacon; Christian Coleman; BeeJay Lee*	Japan (JPN); Shuhei Tada; Shōta Iizuka; Yoshihide Kiryū; Kenji Fujimitsu; Asuka Cambridge*
2019 Doha	United States (USA); Christian Coleman; Justin Gatlin; Mike Rodgers; Noah Lyles; Cravon Gillespie*	Great Britain (GBR); Adam Gemili; Zharnel Hughes; Richard Kilty; Nethaneel Mitchell-Blake	Japan (JPN); Shuhei Tada; Kirara Shiraishi; Yoshihide Kiryū; Abdul Hakim Sani Brown; Yuki Koike*
2022 Eugene	Canada (CAN); Aaron Brown; Jerome Blake; Brendon Rodney; Andre De Grasse	United States (USA); Christian Coleman; Noah Lyles; Elijah Hall; Marvin Bracy	Great Britain (GBR); Jona Efoloko; Zharnel Hughes; Nethaneel Mitchell-Blake; Reece Prescod; Adam Gemili*
2023 Budapest	United States (USA); Christian Coleman; Fred Kerley; Brandon Carnes; Noah Lyles; JT Smith *	Italy (ITA); Roberto Rigali; Lamont Marcell Jacobs; Lorenzo Patta; Filippo Tortu	Jamaica (JAM); Ackeem Blake; Oblique Seville; Ryiem Forde; Rohan Watson
2025 Tokyo	United States (USA); Christian Coleman; Kenny Bednarek; Courtney Lindsey; Noah Lyles; Ronnie Baker*; Trayvon Bromell*; T'Mars McCallum*	Canada (CAN); Aaron Brown; Jerome Blake; Brendon Rodney; Andre De Grasse	Netherlands (NED); Nsikak Ekpo; Taymir Burnet; Xavi Mo-Ajok; Elvis Afrifa

Note * Indicates athletes who ran only in the preliminary round and also received medals.

- ^{4x100m dq1} The Nigerian team of Innocent Asonze, Francis Obikwelu, Daniel Effiong and Deji Aliu originally finished third in the 1999 World Championship, but were disqualified after Asonze was found to have used performance-enhancing drugs.
- ^{4x100m dq2} The United States team of Mickey Grimes, Bernard Williams, Dennis Mitchell and Tim Montgomery originally won the 2001 World Championship in a time of 37.96 seconds, but were disqualified after Montgomery admitted to drug use as a result of the BALCO scandal in 2005.
- ^{4x100m dq3} The British team of Christian Malcolm, Darren Campbell, Marlon Devonish and Dwain Chambers originally finished second in the 2003 World Championship, but were disqualified after Chambers was found to have used performance-enhancing drugs.

==== Medals by country ====
Rank	Nation	Gold	Silver	Bronze	Total
1	United States (USA)	10	3	0	13
2	Jamaica (JAM)	4	1	2	7
3	Canada (CAN)	3	1	3	7
4	Great Britain (GBR)	1	3	6	10
5	France (FRA)	1	2	0	3
6	South Africa (RSA)	1	0	0	1
7	Trinidad and Tobago (TTO)	0	3	0	3
8	Italy (ITA)	0	2	1	3
9	Australia (AUS)	0	1	1	2
9	Brazil (BRA)	0	1	1	2
9	Soviet Union (URS)	0	1	1	2
12	Nigeria (NGR)	0	1	0	1
12	China (CHN)	0	1	0	1
14	Japan (JPN)	0	0	2	2
15	Netherlands (NED)	0	0	2	2
16	Saint Kitts and Nevis (SKN)	0	0	1	1

=== Women ===
Championships	Gold	Silver	Bronze
1983 Helsinki	East Germany (GDR); Silke Gladisch; Marita Koch; Ingrid Auerswald; Marlies Oelsner-Göhr	Great Britain (GBR); Joan Baptiste; Kathy Cook; Beverley Callender; Shirley Thomas	Jamaica (JAM); Leleith Hodges; Jacqueline Pusey; Juliet Cuthbert; Merlene Ottey
1987 Rome	United States (USA); Alice Brown; Diane Williams; Florence Griffith Joyner; Pam Marshall	East Germany (GDR); Silke Möller; Cornelia Oschkenat; Kerstin Behrendt; Marlies Göhr	Soviet Union (URS); Irina Slyusar; Natalya Pomoshchnikova; Natalya German; Olga Antonova
1991 Tokyo	Jamaica (JAM); Dahlia Duhaney; Juliet Cuthbert; Beverly McDonald; Merlene Ottey; Merlene Frazer*	Soviet Union (URS); Natalya Kovtun; Galina Malchugina; Yelena Vinogradova; Irina Privalova	Germany (GER); Grit Breuer; Katrin Krabbe; Sabine Richter; Heike Drechsler
1993 Stuttgart	Russia (RUS); Olga Bogoslovskaya; Galina Malchugina; Natalya Pomoshchnikova-Voronova; Irina Privalova; Marina Trandenkova*	United States (USA); Michelle Finn; Gwen Torrence; Wendy Vereen; Gail Devers; Sheila Echols*	Jamaica (JAM); Michelle Freeman; Juliet Campbell; Nikole Mitchell; Merlene Ottey; Dahlia Duhaney*
1995 Gothenburg	United States (USA); Celena Mondie-Milner; Carlette Guidry; Chryste Gaines; Gwen Torrence; D'Andre Hill*	Jamaica (JAM); Dahlia Duhaney; Juliet Cuthbert; Beverly McDonald; Merlene Ottey; Michelle Freeman*	Germany (GER); Melanie Paschke; Silke Lichtenhagen; Silke-Beate Knoll; Gabriele Becker
1997 Athens	United States (USA); Chryste Gaines; Marion Jones; Inger Miller; Gail Devers	Jamaica (JAM); Beverly McDonald; Merlene Frazer; Juliet Cuthbert; Beverly Grant	France (FRA); Patricia Girard-Léno; Christine Arron; Delphine Combe; Sylviane Félix; Frédérique Bangué*
1999 Seville	Bahamas (BAH); Savatheda Fynes; Chandra Sturrup; Pauline Davis-Thompson; Debbie Ferguson; Eldece Clarke-Lewis*	France (FRA); Patricia Girard; Muriel Hurtis; Katia Benth; Christine Arron; Fabé Dia*	Jamaica (JAM); Aleen Bailey; Merlene Frazer, Beverly McDonald; Peta-Gaye Dowdie
2001 Edmonton^{dq1}	Germany (GER); Melanie Paschke; Gabi Rockmeier; Birgit Rockmeier; Marion Wagner	France (FRA); Sylviane Félix; Frédérique Bangué; Muriel Hurtis; Odiah Sidibé	Jamaica (JAM); Juliet Campbell; Merlene Frazer; Beverly McDonald; Astia Walker; Elva Goulbourne*
2003 Saint-Denis	France (FRA); Patricia Girard-Léno; Muriel Hurtis; Sylviane Félix; Christine Arron	United States (USA); Angela Williams; Chryste Gaines; Inger Miller; Torri Edwards; Lauryn Williams*	Russia (RUS); Olga Fyodorova; Yuliya Tabakova; Marina Kislova; Larisa Kruglova
2005 Helsinki	United States (USA); Angela Daigle; Muna Lee; Me'Lisa Barber; Lauryn Williams	Jamaica (JAM); Danielle Browning; Sherone Simpson; Aleen Bailey; Veronica Campbell; Beverly McDonald*	Belarus (BLR); Yulia Nestsiarenka; Natallia Solohub; Alena Newmyarzhytskaya; Aksana Drahun
2007 Osaka	United States (USA); Lauryn Williams; Allyson Felix; Mikele Barber; Torri Edwards; Carmelita Jeter*; Mechelle Lewis*	Jamaica (JAM); Sheri-Ann Brooks; Kerron Stewart; Simone Facey; Veronica Campbell; Shelly-Ann Fraser*	Belgium (BEL); Olivia Borlée; Hanna Mariën; Élodie Ouédraogo; Kim Gevaert
2009 Berlin	Jamaica (JAM); Simone Facey; Shelly-Ann Fraser; Aleen Bailey; Kerron Stewart	Bahamas (BAH); Sheniqua Ferguson; Chandra Sturrup; Christine Amertil; Debbie Ferguson-McKenzie	Germany (GER); Marion Wagner; Anne Möllinger; Cathleen Tschirch; Verena Sailer
2011 Daegu	United States (USA); Bianca Knight; Allyson Felix; Marshevet Myers; Carmelita Jeter; Shalonda Solomon*; Alexandria Anderson*	Jamaica (JAM); Shelly-Ann Fraser-Pryce; Kerron Stewart; Sherone Simpson; Veronica Campbell-Brown; Jura Levy*	Ukraine (UKR); Olesya Povh; Nataliya Pohrebnyak; Mariya Ryemyen; Hrystyna Stuy
2013 Moscow	Jamaica (JAM); Carrie Russell; Kerron Stewart; Schillonie Calvert; Shelly-Ann Fraser-Pryce; Sheri-Ann Brooks*	United States (USA); Jeneba Tarmoh; Alexandria Anderson; English Gardner; Octavious Freeman	Great Britain (GBR); Dina Asher-Smith; Ashleigh Nelson; Annabelle Lewis; Hayley Jones
2015 Beijing	Jamaica (JAM); Veronica Campbell-Brown; Natasha Morrison; Elaine Thompson; Shelly-Ann Fraser-Pryce; Sherone Simpson*; Kerron Stewart*	United States (USA); English Gardner; Allyson Felix; Jenna Prandini; Jasmine Todd	Trinidad and Tobago (TRI); Kelly-Ann Baptiste; Michelle-Lee Ahye; Reyare Thomas; Semoy Hackett; Khalifa St. Fort*
2017 London	United States (USA); Aaliyah Brown; Allyson Felix; Morolake Akinosun; Tori Bowie; Ariana Washington*	Great Britain (GBR); Asha Philip; Desirèe Henry; Dina Asher-Smith; Daryll Neita	Jamaica (JAM); Jura Levy; Natasha Morrison; Simone Facey; Sashalee Forbes; Christania Williams*
2019 Doha	Jamaica (JAM); Natalliah Whyte; Shelly-Ann Fraser-Pryce; Jonielle Smith; Shericka Jackson; Natasha Morrison*	Great Britain (GBR); Asha Philip; Dina Asher-Smith; Ashleigh Nelson; Daryll Neita; Imani-Lara Lansiquot*	United States (USA); Dezerea Bryant; Teahna Daniels; Morolake Akinosun; Kiara Parker
2022 Eugene	United States (USA); Melissa Jefferson; Abby Steiner; Jenna Prandini; Twanisha Terry; Aleia Hobbs*	Jamaica (JAM); Kemba Nelson; Elaine Thompson-Herah; Shelly-Ann Fraser-Pryce; Shericka Jackson; Briana Williams*; Natalliah Whyte*; Remona Burchell*	Germany (GER); Tatjana Pinto; Alexandra Burghardt; Gina Lückenkemper; Rebekka Haase
2023 Budapest	United States (USA); Tamari Davis; Twanisha Terry; Gabby Thomas; Sha'Carri Richardson; Tamara Clark*; Melissa Jefferson*	Jamaica (JAM); Natasha Morrison; Shelly-Ann Fraser-Pryce; Shashalee Forbes; Shericka Jackson; Briana Williams*; Elaine Thompson-Herah*	Great Britain (GBR); Asha Philip; Imani-Lara Lansiquot; Bianca Williams; Daryll Neita; Annie Tagoe*
2025 Tokyo	United States (USA); Melissa Jefferson-Wooden; Twanisha Terry; Kayla White; Sha'Carri Richardson; Jacious Sears*	Jamaica (JAM); Shelly-Ann Fraser-Pryce; Tia Clayton; Tina Clayton; Jonielle Smith; Jodean Williams*	Germany (GER); Sina Mayer; Rebekka Haase; Sophia Junk; Gina Lückenkemper

Note * Indicates athletes who ran only in the preliminary round and also received medals.

- ^{dq1} The United States team of Kelli White, Chryste Gaines, Inger Miller, and Marion Jones originally won the 2001 World Championship in a time of 41.71 seconds, but were disqualified after Jones and White were found to have used performance-enhancing drugs.

== World leading times ==
=== Men ===
Year	Time	Team	Athletes	Place	Event	Ref.
1972	38.19	United States	Larry Black, Robert Taylor, Gerald Tinker, Eddie Hart	(West Germany) Munich	1972 Summer Olympics	
1973	38.8 h	East Germany	Eberhard Weise, Michael Droese, Hans-Jürgen Bombach, Siegfried Schenke	(East Germany) East Berlin		
1974	38.69	France	Lucien Sainte-Rose, Joseph Arame, Bruno Cherrier, Dominique Chauvelot	(Italy) Rome	1974 European Athletics Championships	
1975	38.31 A	United States	Clancy Edwards, Larry Brown, Donald Merrick, Bill Collins	Mexico City	1975 Pan American Games	
1976	38.33	United States	Harvey Glance, Johnny Jones, Millard Hampton, Steve Riddick	(Canada) Montreal	1976 Summer Olympics	
1977	38.03	United States	Bill Collins, Steve Riddick, Cliff Wiley, Steve Williams	(West Germany) Düsseldorf	1977 IAAF World Cup	
1978	38.55	Tobias Striders	(Panama) Guy Abrahams, (United States) Michael Simmons, (Jamaica) Don Quarrie, (Guyana) James Gilkes	(United States) Tempe	1978 Sun Devil Classic	
1979	38.30 A	(United States) South Team	Mike Roberson, Harvey Glance, Bill Collins, Mel Lattany	(United States) Colorado Springs	1979 U.S. Olympic Festival	
1980	38.26	Soviet Union	Vladimir Muravyov, Nikolay Sidorov, Andrey Prokofyev, Aleksandr Aksinin	(Soviet Union) Moscow	1980 Summer Olympics	
1981	38.66	Poland	Krzysztof Zwoliński, Zenon Licznerski, Leszek Dunecki, Marian Woronin	(Socialist Federal Republic of Yugoslavia) Zagreb	1981 European Cup	
1982	38.13	United States	Mel Lattany, Stanley Floyd, Calvin Smith, Carl Lewis	(Switzerland) Zurich	1982 Weltklasse Zürich	
1983	37.86	United States	Emmit King, Willie Gault, Calvin Smith, Carl Lewis	(Finland) Helsinki	1983 IAAF World Championships	
1984	37.83	United States	Sam Graddy, Ron Brown, Calvin Smith, Carl Lewis	(United States) Los Angeles	1984 Summer Olympics	
1985	38.10	United States	Harvey Glance, Kirk Baptiste, Calvin Smith, Dwayne Evans	(Australia) Canberra	1985 IAAF World Cup	
1986	37.98	United States	Lee McRae, Floyd Heard, Harvey Glance, Carl Lewis	(Soviet Union) Moscow	1986 Goodwill Games	
1987	37.90	United States	Lee McRae, Lee McNeill, Harvey Glance, Carl Lewis	(Italy) Rome	1987 IAAF World Championships	
1988	38.19	Soviet Union	Viktor Bryzhin, Vladimir Krylov, Vladimir Muravyov, Vitaliy Savin	(South Korea) Seoul	1988 Summer Olympics	
1989	38.23 A	Texas Christian University	(United States) Horatio Porter, (Jamaica) Andrew Smith, (United States) Greg Sholars, (Jamaica) Raymond Stewart	(United States) Provo	1989 NCAA Division I Outdoor Track and Field Championships	
1990	37.79	France	Max Morinière, Daniel Sangouma, Jean-Charles Trouabal, Bruno Marie-Rose	(Socialist Federal Republic of Yugoslavia) Split	1990 European Athletics Championships	
1991	37.50	United States	Andre Cason, Leroy Burrell, Dennis Mitchell, Carl Lewis	(Japan) Tokyo	1991 IAAF World Championships	
1992	37.40	United States	Michael Marsh, Leroy Burrell, Dennis Mitchell, Carl Lewis	(Spain) Barcelona	1992 Summer Olympics	
1993	37.40	United States	Jon Drummond, Andre Cason, Dennis Mitchell, Leroy Burrell	(Germany) Stuttgart	1993 IAAF World Championships	
1994	37.79	(United States) Santa Monica Track Club	Michael Marsh, Leroy Burrell, Floyd Heard, Carl Lewis	(United States) Walnut	1994 Mt. SAC Relays	
1995	38.16	Canada	Robert Esmie, Glenroy Gilbert, Bruny Surin, Donovan Bailey	(Sweden) Gothenburg	1995 IAAF World Championships (Semifinal)	
1996	37.69	Canada	Robert Esmie, Glenroy Gilbert, Bruny Surin, Donovan Bailey	(United States) Atlanta	1996 Summer Olympics	
1997	37.86	Canada	Robert Esmie, Glenroy Gilbert, Bruny Surin, Donovan Bailey	(Greece) Athens	1997 IAAF World Championships	
1998	38.04	Texas Christian University	(United States) Bryan Howard, (United States) Jarmiene Holloway, (Jamaica) Syan Williams, (Jamaica) Percival Spencer	(United States) Buffalo	1998 NCAA Division I Outdoor Track and Field Championships	
1999	37.59	United States	Jon Drummond, Tim Montgomery, Bernard Williams, Maurice Greene	(Spain) Seville	1999 IAAF World Championships	
2000	37.61	United States	Jon Drummond, Bernard Williams, Brian Lewis, Maurice Greene	(Australia) Sydney	2000 Summer Olympics	
2001	37.88	(United States) Hudson Smith International	Jon Drummond, Bernard Williams, Curtis Johnson, Maurice Greene	(United States) Austin	2001 Texas Relays	
2002	37.95	United States	Jon Drummond, Jason Smoots, Kaaron Conwright, Coby Miller	(Spain) Madrid	2002 IAAF World Cup	
2003	37.77	United States I	Jon Drummond, Bernard Williams, Darvis Patton, Maurice Greene	(Germany) Berlin	2003 ISTAF Berlin	
2004	37.92	United States I	Shawn Crawford, Justin Gatlin, Coby Miller, Maurice Greene	(Germany) Munich	Athletics Team Challenge	
2005	38.08	France	Ladji Doucouré, Ronald Pognon, Eddy De Lépine, Lueyi Dovy	(Finland) Helsinki	2005 IAAF World Championships	
2006	37.59	United States	Kaaron Conwright, Wallace Spearmon, Tyson Gay, Jason Smoots	(Greece) Athens	2006 IAAF World Cup	
2007	37.78	United States	Darvis Patton, Wallace Spearmon, Tyson Gay, Leroy Dixon	(Japan) Osaka	2007 IAAF World Championships	
2008	37.80	United States Red	Rodney Martin, Travis Padgett, Shawn Crawford, Darvis Patton	(England) London	2008 London Grand Prix	
2009	37.31	Jamaica	Steve Mullings, Michael Frater, Yohan Blake, Usain Bolt	(Germany) Berlin	2009 IAAF World Championships	
2010	37.45	United States	Trell Kimmons, Wallace Spearmon, Tyson Gay, Mike Rodgers	(Switzerland) Zurich	2010 Weltklasse Zürich	
2011	37.04	Jamaica	Nesta Carter, Michael Frater, Yohan Blake, Usain Bolt	(South Korea) Daegu	2011 IAAF World Championships	
2012	36.84	Jamaica	Nesta Carter, Michael Frater, Yohan Blake, Usain Bolt	(England) London	2012 Summer Olympics	
2013	37.36	Jamaica	Nesta Carter, Kemar Bailey-Cole, Nickel Ashmeade, Usain Bolt	(Russia) Moscow	2013 IAAF World Championships	
2014	37.58	Jamaica	Jason Livermore, Kemar Bailey-Cole, Nickel Ashmeade, Usain Bolt	(Scotland) Glasgow	2014 Commonwealth Games	
2015	37.36	Jamaica	Nesta Carter, Asafa Powell, Nickel Ashmeade, Usain Bolt	(China) Beijing	2015 IAAF World Championships	
2016	37.27	Jamaica	Asafa Powell, Yohan Blake, Nickel Ashmeade, Usain Bolt	(Brazil) Rio de Janeiro	2016 Summer Olympics	
2017	37.47	Great Britain	Chijindu Ujah, Adam Gemili, Danny Talbot, Nethaneel Mitchell-Blake	(England) London	2017 IAAF World Championships	
2018	37.61	Great Britain	Chijindu Ujah, Zharnel Hughes, Adam Gemili, Nethaneel Mitchell-Blake	(England) London	2018 London Müller Anniversary Games	
2019	37.10	United States	Christian Coleman, Justin Gatlin, Mike Rodgers, Noah Lyles	(Qatar) Doha	2019 World Athletics Championships	
2020	38.56	(Jamaica) Sprintec Lions	Andrew Fisher, Everton Clarke, Romario Williams, Demish Gaye	(Jamaica) Spanish Town	2020 Milo Western Relays	
2021	37.50	Italy	Lorenzo Patta, Marcell Jacobs, Fausto Desalu, Filippo Tortu	(Japan) Tokyo	2020 Summer Olympics	
2022	37.48	Canada	Aaron Brown, Jerome Blake, Brendon Rodney, Andre De Grasse	(United States) Eugene	2022 World Athletics Championships	
2023	37.38	United States	Christian Coleman, Fred Kerley, Brandon Carnes, Noah Lyles	(Hungary) Budapest	2023 World Athletics Championships	
2024	37.40	United States	Courtney Lindsey, Kenny Bednarek, Kyree King, Noah Lyles	(The Bahamas) Nassau	2024 World Athletics Relays	
2025	37.29	United States	Christian Coleman, Kenny Bednarek, Courtney Lindsey, Noah Lyles	(Japan) Tokyo	2025 World Athletics Championships	
2026	37.43	United States	Ronnie Baker, Max Thomas, Lance Lang, PJ Austin	(Botswana) Gaborone	2026 World Athletics Relays	

=== Women ===
Year	Time	Team	Athletes	Place	Event	Ref.
1972	42.81	West Germany	Christiane Krause, Ingrid Mickler-Becker, Annegret Richter, Heide Rosendahl	(West Germany) Munich	1972 Summer Olympics	
1973	42.6 h	East Germany	Petra Kandarr, Renate Stecher, Christina Heinich, Doris Selmigkeit	(East Germany) Potsdam		
1974	42.51	East Germany	Doris Maletzki, Renate Stecher, Christina Heinich, Bärbel Eckert	(Italy) Rome	1974 European Athletics Championships	
1975	42.74	East Germany	Doris Maletzki, Monika Hamann, Sybille Priebsch, Renate Stecher	(People's Republic of Bulgaria) Sofia	1975 European Cup (Semifinal)	
1976	42.50	East Germany	Marlies Oelsner, Renate Stecher, Carla Bodendorf, Martina Blos	(East Germany) Karl-Marx-Stadt		
1977	42.51	Europe	(West Germany) Elvira Possekel, (United Kingdom) Andrea Lynch, (West Germany) Annegret Richter, (United Kingdom) Sonia Lannaman	(West Germany) Düsseldorf	1977 IAAF World Cup	
1978	42.27	East Germany	Johanna Klier, Monika Hamann, Carla Bodendorf, Marlies Göhr	(East Germany) Potsdam		
1979	42.09	East Germany	Romy Müller, Bärbel Wöckel, Ingrid Auerswald, Marlies Göhr	(Italy) Turin	1979 European Cup	
1980	41.60	East Germany	Romy Müller, Bärbel Wöckel, Ingrid Auerswald, Marlies Göhr	(Soviet Union) Moscow	1980 Summer Olympics	
1981	42.22	East Germany	Kirsten Siemon, Bärbel Wöckel, Gesine Walther, Marlies Göhr	(Italy) Rome	1981 IAAF World Cup	
1982	41.97	East Germany	Gesine Walther, Bärbel Wöckel, Bärbel Schölzel, Marlies Göhr	(East Germany) Potsdam		
1983	41.53	East Germany	Silke Gladisch, Marita Koch, Ingrid Auerswald, Marlies Göhr	(East Germany) East Berlin		
1984	41.65	United States	Alice Brown, Jeanette Bolden, Chandra Cheeseborough, Evelyn Ashford	(United States) Los Angeles	1984 Summer Olympics	
1985	41.37	East Germany	Silke Gladisch, Sabine Rieger, Ingrid Auerswald, Marlies Göhr	(Australia) Canberra	1985 IAAF World Cup	
1986	41.84	East Germany	Silke Gladisch, Sabine Rieger, Ingrid Auerswald, Marlies Göhr	(West Germany) Stuttgart	1986 European Athletics Championships	
1987	41.55	United States	Alice Brown, Diane Williams, Florence Griffith Joyner, Pam Marshall	(West Germany) West Berlin	1987 ISTAF Berlin	
1988	41.73	East Germany	Silke Möller, Kerstin Behrendt, Ingrid Auerswald, Marlies Göhr	(East Germany) East Berlin		
1989	41.68	East Germany	Silke Möller, Katrin Krabbe, Kerstin Behrendt, Sabine Günther	(England) Gateshead	1989 European Cup	
1990	41.68	East Germany	Silke Möller, Katrin Krabbe, Kerstin Behrendt, Sabine Günther	(Socialist Federal Republic of Yugoslavia) Split	1990 European Athletics Championships	
1991	41.91	Germany	Grit Breuer, Katrin Krabbe, Sabine Richter, Heike Drechsler	(Japan) Tokyo	1991 IAAF World Championships (Heat 2)	
1992	42.11	United States	Evelyn Ashford, Esther Jones, Carlette Guidry, Gwen Torrence	(Spain) Barcelona	1992 Summer Olympics	
1993	41.49	Russia	Olga Bogoslovskaya, Galina Malchugina, Natalya Voronova, Irina Privalova	(Germany) Stuttgart	1993 IAAF World Championships	
1994	42.45	United States	Chryste Gaines, Carlette Guidry, Cheryl Taplin, Dannette Young	(United States) Durham	1994 Pan Africa-USA International	
1995	42.12	United States	Celena Mondie-Milner, Carlette Guidry-White, Chryste Gaines, Gwen Torrence	(Sweden) Gothenburg	1995 IAAF World Championships	
1996	41.95	United States	Chryste Gaines, Gail Devers, Inger Miller, Gwen Torrence	(United States) Atlanta	1996 Summer Olympics	
1997	41.47	United States	Chryste Gaines, Marion Jones, Inger Miller, Gail Devers	(Greece) Athens	1997 IAAF World Championships	
1998	42.00 A	United States	Cheryl Taplin, Chryste Gaines, Inger Miller, Carlette Guidry-White	(South Africa) Johannesburg	1998 IAAF World Cup	
1999	41.92	Bahamas	Sevatheda Fynes, Chandra Sturrup, Pauline Davis-Thompson, Debbie Ferguson	(Spain) Seville	1999 IAAF World Championships	
2000	41.95	Bahamas	Sevatheda Fynes, Chandra Sturrup, Pauline Davis-Thompson, Debbie Ferguson	(Australia) Sydney	2000 Summer Olympics	
2001	42.32	Germany	Melanie Paschke, Gabi Rockmeier, Birgit Rockmeier, Marion Wagner	(Canada) Edmonton	2001 IAAF World Championships	
2002	41.91	Americas	(Jamaica) Tayna Lawrence, (Jamaica) Juliet Campbell, (Jamaica) Beverly McDonald, (The Bahamas) Debbie Ferguson	(Spain) Madrid	2002 IAAF World Cup	
2003	41.78	France	Patricia Girard-Léno, Muriel Hurtis, Sylviane Félix, Christine Arron	(France) Paris	2003 IAAF World Championships	
2004	41.73	Jamaica	Tayna Lawrence, Sherone Simpson, Aleen Bailey, Veronica Campbell	(Greece) Athens	2004 Summer Olympics	
2005	41.78	United States	Angela Daigle, Muna Lee, Me'Lisa Barber, Lauryn Williams	(Finland) Helsinki	2005 IAAF World Championships	
2006	42.26	Americas	(Jamaica) Aleen Bailey, (The Bahamas) Debbie Ferguson, (Cayman Islands) Cydonie Mothersille, (Jamaica) Sherone Simpson	(Greece) Athens	2006 IAAF World Cup	
2007	41.98	United States	Lauryn Williams, Allyson Felix, Mikele Barber, Torri Edwards	(Japan) Osaka	2007 IAAF World Championships	
2008	42.24	Jamaica	Shelly-Ann Fraser, Sheri-Ann Brooks, Aleen Bailey, Veronica Campbell-Brown	(China) Beijing	2008 Summer Olympics (Heat 2)	
2009	41.58	United States	Lauryn Williams, Allyson Felix, Muna Lee, Carmelita Jeter	(Germany) Cottbus	2009 International Lausitzer Leichtathletik Meeting	
2010	42.29	Ukraine	Olesya Povh, Nataliya Pohrebnyak, Mariya Ryemyen, Yelizaveta Bryzgina	(Spain) Barcelona	2010 European Athletics Championships	
2011	41.56	United States	Bianca Knight, Allyson Felix, Marshevet Myers, Carmelita Jeter	(South Korea) Daegu	2011 IAAF World Championships	
2012	40.82	United States	Tianna Bartoletta, Allyson Felix, Bianca Knight, Carmelita Jeter	(England) London	2012 Summer Olympics	
2013	41.29	Jamaica	Carrie Russell, Kerron Stewart, Schillonie Calvert, Shelly-Ann Fraser-Pryce	(Russia) Moscow	2013 IAAF World Championships	
2014	41.83	Jamaica	Kerron Stewart, Veronica Campbell-Brown, Schillonie Calvert, Shelly-Ann Fraser-Pryce	(Scotland) Glasgow	2014 Commonwealth Games	
2015	41.07	Jamaica	Veronica Campbell-Brown, Natasha Morrison, Elaine Thompson, Shelly-Ann Fraser-Pryce	(China) Beijing	2015 IAAF World Championships	
2016	41.01	United States	Tianna Bartoletta, Allyson Felix, English Gardner, Tori Bowie	(Brazil) Rio de Janeiro	2016 Summer Olympics	
2017	41.82	United States	Aaliyah Brown, Allyson Felix, Morolake Akinosun, Tori Bowie	(England) London	2017 IAAF World Championships	
2018	41.88	Great Britain	Asha Philip, Bianca Williams, Imani-Lara Lansiquot, Dina Asher-Smith	(Germany) Berlin	2018 European Athletics Championships	
2019	41.44	Jamaica	Natalliah Whyte, Shelly-Ann Fraser-Pryce, Jonielle Smith, Shericka Jackson	(Qatar) Doha	2019 World Athletics Championships	
2020	43.47	(Jamaica) Sprintec	Shashalee Forbes, Natasha Morrison, Anastasia Natalie Le-Roy, Ronda Whyte	(Jamaica) Kingston	2020 Gibson McCook Relays	
2021	41.02	Jamaica	Briana Williams, Elaine Thompson-Herah, Shelly-Ann Fraser-Pryce, Shericka Jackson	(Japan) Tokyo	2020 Summer Olympics	
2022	41.14	United States	Melissa Jefferson, Abby Steiner, Jenna Prandini, Twanisha Terry	(United States) Eugene	2022 World Athletics Championships	
2023	41.03	United States	Tamari Davis, Twanisha Terry, Gabrielle Thomas, Sha'Carri Richardson	(Hungary) Budapest	2023 World Athletics Championships	
2024	41.55	Great Britain	Dina Asher-Smith, Imani Lansiquot, Amy Hunt, Daryll Neita	(England) London	2024 London Athletics Meet	
2025	41.60	United States	Jacious Sears, Twanisha Terry, Kayla White, Sha'Carri Richardson	(Japan) Tokyo	2025 World Athletics Championships	
2026	41.58	(United States) USC Trojans	Dajaz DeFrand, Mia Brahe-Pedersen, Madison Whyte, Brianna Selby	(United States) Eugene	2026 NCAA Division I Outdoor Track and Field Championships	

== See also ==
- Italy national track relay team
- List of fastest anchor legs
