= Kai Jensen =

Danish athlete (1897–1997)

Kai Sofus Marinus Jensen (25 February 1897 – 31 May 1997) was a Danish track and field athlete who competed at the 1924 Summer Olympics where, representing Københavns Idræts Forening, he was eliminated in the quarterfinals of the men's 400 metres, the semifinals of the men's 800 metres and the men's 4 × 100 metres relay. In the latter he competed alongside Poul Schiang, Henri Thorsen, and Mogens Truelsen. He was born in Copenhagen and died in Birkerød at the age of 100.
