= Wiberg =

Wiberg is a Swedish surname. Notable people with the surname include:

- Anders Wiberg (1816–1887), Swedish preacher
- Curt Wiberg (1898–1988), Swedish sprinter
- Daryl Wiberg (born 1951), Canadian politician
- Finn Wiberg (born 1943), Danish footballer and manager
- Johanna Wiberg (born 1983), Swedish handball player
- Kenneth B. Wiberg (1927–2026), American chemist and academic
- Martin Wiberg (1826–1905), Swedish inventor
- Nicklas Wiberg (born 1985), Swedish decathlete
- Per Wiberg (born 1968), Swedish musician
- Pernilla Wiberg (born 1970), Swedish alpine skier
- Susanne Wiberg (born 1963), Swedish canoeist

== See also ==
- 27267 Wiberg, a minor planet
