= Österdahl =

Österdahl is a Swedish surname literally translating to "eastern valley". Notable people with the surname include:

- Bror Österdahl (1900–1973), Swedish sprinter
- Maire Österdahl (1927–2013), Finnish sprinter
- Marcus Österdahl (born 1943), Swedish musician and record producer
- Martin Österdahl (born 1973), Swedish author and television producer
