= Bonacina =

Bonacina is a surname. Notable people with the surname include:

- Ernesto Bonacina (1902–1944), Italian sprinter
- Fabio Bonacina (1923–2012), Italian gymnast
- Valter Bonacina (born 1964), Italian footballer and coach
- Giovanni Battista Bonacina (c. 1620–?), Italian renaissance painter
