= Ioannis Talianos =

Greek sprinter

Personal information
- Nationality: Greek
- Born: 1901 Cyprus

Sport
- Sport: Sprinting
- Event: 4 × 100 metres relay

Ioannis Talianos (born 1901, date of death unknown) was a Greek sprinter. He competed in the men's 4 × 100 metres relay at the 1924 Summer Olympics.
