= Väinö Eskola =

Finnish sprinter

Personal information
- Nationality: Finnish
- Born: 1 September 1894 Kalvola, Finland
- Died: 17 October 1952 (aged 58) Hämeenlinna, Finland

Sport
- Sport: Track and field
- Event: 100m

Väinö Eskola (1 September 1894 – 17 October 1952) was a Finnish sprinter. He competed in the men's 100 metres and the 4×100 metres relay events at the 1924 Summer Olympics.
