= Anthony Vince =

Canadian sprinter (1902–1986)

Personal information
- Born: 30 July 1902 Toronto, Canada
- Died: 28 September 1986 (aged 84) Toronto, Canada

Sport
- Sport: Track and field
- Event: 100m

Anthony Vince (30 July 1902 – 28 September 1986) was a Canadian sprinter. He competed in the men's 100 metres and the 4×100 metres relay events at the 1924 Summer Olympics.
