= Anton Husgafvel =

Finnish sprinter

Personal information
- Nationality: Finnish
- Born: 26 September 1900 Pirkkala, Finland
- Died: 17 June 1980 (aged 79) Helsinki, Finland

Sport
- Sport: Track and field
- Event: 100m

Anton Husgafvel (26 September 1900 – 17 June 1980) was a Finnish sprinter. He competed in the men's 100 metres and the 4×100 metres relay events at the 1924 Summer Olympics.
