= Guillermo Newberry =

Argentine sprinter

Personal information
- Nationality: Argentine
- Born: 9 May 1898

Sport
- Sport: Sprinting
- Event: 4 × 100 metres relay

Guillermo Newberry (born 9 May 1898, date of death unknown) was an Argentine sprinter. He competed in the men's 4 × 100 metres relay at the 1924 Summer Olympics.
