= Rinus van den Berge =

Dutch sprinter (1900–1972)

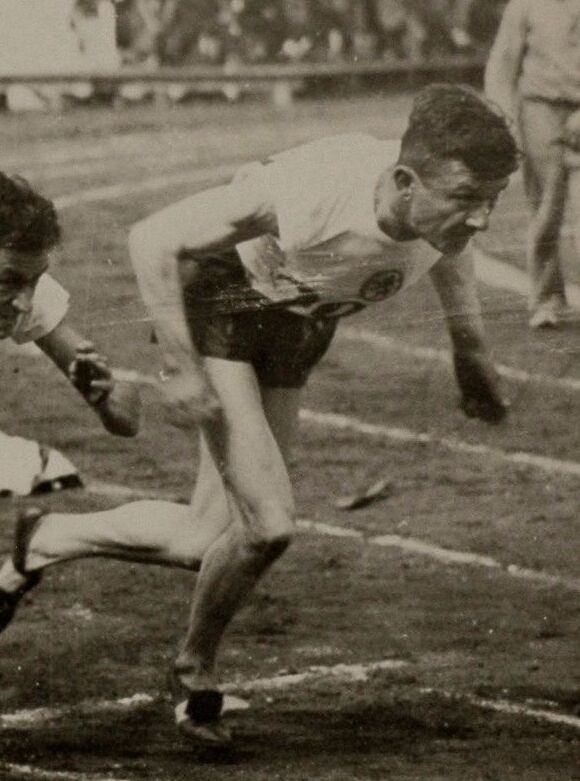

Medal record

Men's athletics

Representing the Netherlands
Bronze medal – third place	1924 Paris	4x100 metre relay

Marinus "Rinus" van den Berge (12 March 1900 in Rotterdam – 23 October 1972) was a Dutch athlete, who competed mainly in the 100 metres.

He competed for the Netherlands in the 1924 Summer Olympics held in Paris, France in the 4 x 100 metres relay, where he won the bronze medal with his teammates Jan de Vries, Jacob Boot and Harry Broos.
