= Jan de Vries (athlete) =

Dutch sprinter (1896–1939)

Olympic medal record

Men's athletics

Representing the Netherlands
Bronze medal – third place	1924 Paris	4×100 metres relay

Jan Cornelis ("Jan") de Vries (2 March 1896 in Zwolle – 19 April 1939 in The Hague) was a Dutch athlete, who competed mainly in the 100 metres.

De Vries competed for the Netherlands in the 1924 Summer Olympics held in Paris, France in the 4 x 100 metres relay, where he won the bronze medal with his team mates Jacob Boot, Harry Broos, and Marinus van den Berge.
