= Argyris Karagiannis =

Greek sprinter

Personal information
- Nationality: Greek
- Born: 1 July 1903

Sport
- Sport: Sprinting
- Event: 4 × 100 metres relay

Argyris Karagiannis (born 1 July 1903, date of death unknown) was a Greek sprinter. He competed in the men's 4 × 100 metres relay at the 1924 Summer Olympics.
