= Gusztáv Rózsahegyi =

Hungarian sprinter

Personal information
- Nationality: Hungarian
- Born: 27 February 1901 Budapest, Austria-Hungary
- Died: 9 January 1975 (aged 73) Budapest, Hungary

Sport
- Sport: Track and field
- Event: 100m

Gusztáv Rózsahegyi (27 February 1901 – 9 January 1975) was a Hungarian sprinter. He competed in the men's 100 metres and the 4×100 metres relay events at the 1924 Summer Olympics.
