= Kurt Branting =

Swedish sprinter (1900–1958)

Personal information
- Nationality: Swedish
- Born: 1 February 1900
- Died: 1 July 1958 (aged 58)

Sport
- Sport: Sprinting
- Event: 4 × 100 metres relay

Kurt Branting (1 February 1900 – 1 July 1958) was a Swedish sprinter. He competed in the men's 4 × 100 metres relay at the 1924 Summer Olympics.
