= Timothy Royle =

British businessman (1931–2021)

Timothy Lancelot Fanshawe Royle (24 April 1931 – 27 October 2021) was founder and chairman of the Control Risks Group.

== Biography ==
Timothy Lancelot Fanshawe Royle was born on 24 April 1931, as the son of Sir Lancelot Royle. He was educated at Harrow School and Mons Military Academy (UK). Royle joined the British Army and served with the 15th/19th The King's Royal Hussars. Royle was appointed CEO of the Hogg Robinson group in 1980 and left the company in 1981, leading a management buyout of the Control Risks Group.

He married, in 1958, Margaret Jill Stedeford, daughter of Sir Ivan Stedeford and Lady Stedeford, of Claverdon Hall, Warwickshire.

Royle died on 27 October 2021, at the age of 90.
