= Heinz Hemmi =

Swiss sprinter

Personal information
- Nationality: Swiss
- Born: 23 November 1899
- Died: February 1985

Sport
- Sport: Sprinting
- Event: 4 × 100 metres relay

Heinz Hemmi (23 November 1899 – February 1985) was a Swiss sprinter. He competed in the men's 4 × 100 metres relay at the 1924 Summer Olympics.
