= Ernesto Bonacina =

Italian sprinter (1902–1944)

Personal information
- Nationality: Italian
- Born: 12 November 1902 Milan, Italy
- Died: 4 September 1944 (aged 41)

Sport
- Country: Italy
- Sport: Athletics
- Event: Sprint
- Club: Sport Club Italia

Achievements and titles
- Personal best: 100 m: 10.8 (1926)

Ernesto Bonacina (12 November 1902 – 4 September 1944) was an Italian sprinter.

== Biography ==
He competed in the men's 100 metres and the 4 × 100 metres relay events at the 1924 Summer Olympics. He had three caps for the national team from 1924 to 1928. His personal best in the 100 metres was 10.8 established in 1926. His athletic club was Sport Club Italia.

Bonacina won three team relay events at the national championship. On 16 June 1918 he won the Race of Sesto San Giovanni in Milan organized by Club Audace. Second place went to Italo Vacher while Pietro Sperti was third.

== Olympic results ==
Year	Competition	Venue	Position	Event	Performance	Note
1924	Olympic Games	(France) Paris	QF	100 metres	11.2	
1924	Olympic Games	(France) Paris	SF	4×100 metres relay	at one metre to second	

== National championships ==
- 2 wins in 4×100 metres relay (1921, 1922)
- 1 win in Olympic relay (1921)
