= Otto Diesch =

Argentine sprinter

Otto Dietsch
Personal information
- Nationality: Argentine
- Born: 1896

Sport
- Sport: Sprinting
- Event: 4 × 100 metres relay

Otto Dietsch (born 1896, date of death unknown) was an Argentine sprinter. He competed in the men's 4 × 100 metres relay at the 1924 Summer Olympics.
