= Albert Heisé =

French sprinter

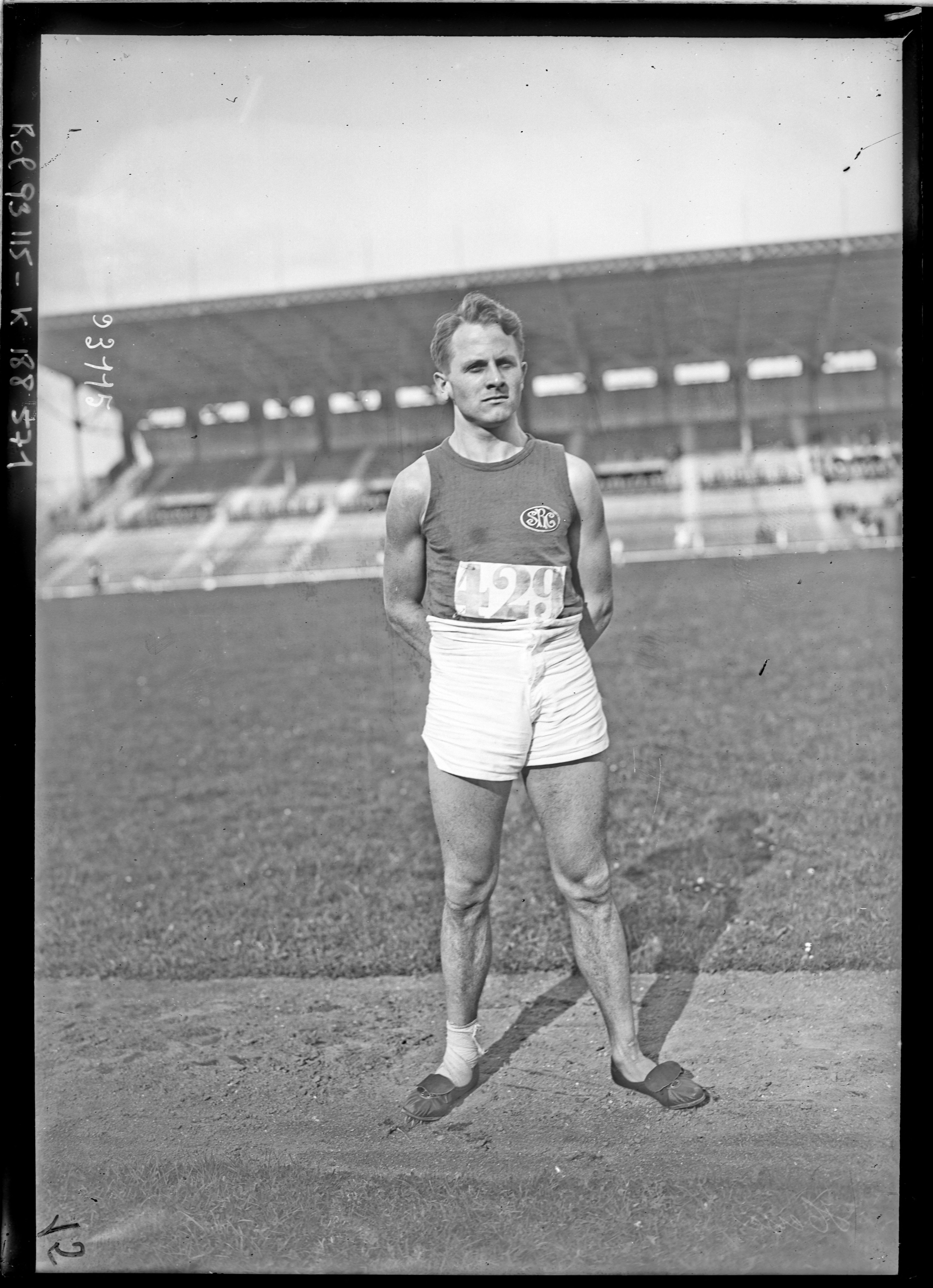
- Heisé in 1924

Personal information
- Nationality: French
- Born: 13 May 1899 Molsheim, France
- Died: 7 January 1951 (aged 51) Colmar, France

Sport
- Sport: Track and field
- Event: 100m

Albert Heisé (13 May 1899 – 7 January 1951) was a French sprinter. He competed in the men's 100 metres and the 4×100 metres relay events at the 1924 Summer Olympics.
