= Alexandros Papafingos =

Greek sprinter

Personal information
- Nationality: Greek
- Born: 1901 Alexandria, Egypt

Sport
- Sport: Track and field
- Event(s): 100m, 200m

Alexandros Papafingos (born 1901, date of death unknown) was a Greek sprinter. He competed in three events at the 1924 Summer Olympics.
