= Victor Moriaud =

Swiss sprinter

Personal information
- Nationality: Swiss
- Born: 20 October 1900

Sport
- Sport: Track and field
- Event(s): 100m, 110m hurdles

Achievements and titles
- Olympic finals: 1924 Summer Olympics

David Victor Moriaud (born 20 October 1900, date of death unknown) was a Swiss sprinter. He competed in three events at the 1924 Summer Olympics.
