= Mogens Truelsen =

Danish sprinter

Personal information
- Nationality: Danish
- Born: 25 July 1901 Taarbæk, Denmark
- Died: 10 December 1979 (aged 78) Gentofte, Denmark

Sport
- Sport: Track and field
- Events: 100m, 200m, 4x100m

Mogens Truelsen (25 July 1901 – 10 December 1979) was a Danish sprinter. He competed in the men's 100 metres, men's 200 metres and the 4 × 100 metres relay events at the 1924 Summer Olympics.
