= Lajos Kurunczy =

Hungarian sprinter

Personal information
- Nationality: Hungarian
- Born: 3 July 1896 Budapest, Hungary
- Died: 22 December 1983 (aged 87) Budapest, Hungary

Sport
- Sport: Track and field
- Event(s): 100m, 200m, 400m

Lajos Kurunczy (3 July 1896 – 22 December 1983) was a Hungarian sprinter. He competed in four events at the 1924 Summer Olympics.
