= Alex Natan =

- Born: Heinz Alexander Nathan; 1 February 1906
- Died: 14 January 1971 (aged 64)
- Occupations: Sprinter, sports writer, political activist
- Known for: Member of the bürgerlich sports movement; described as the "fastest Jew in Germany"
- Notable work: Silver Renaissance, Sport and Society, Richard Strauss: die Opern

Heinz Alex Natan (1 February 1906 - 14 January 1971) was a German-Jewish sprinter, sports writer and political activist described by Alfred Flechtheim as the "fastest Jew in Germany". He was a member of the bürgerlich sports movement and ran for SC Charlottenburg Berlin.

== Selected publications ==
- Silver renaissance: essays in eighteenth-century English history
- Swiss men of letters: twelve literary essays
- German men of letters: twelve literary essays
- Sport and society: a symposium
- Primadonna: Lob der Stimmen
- Britain today
- Primo uomo: grosse Sänger der Oper
- Richard Strauss: die Opern
