= Jaap Boot =

Dutch athletics competitor (1903–1986)

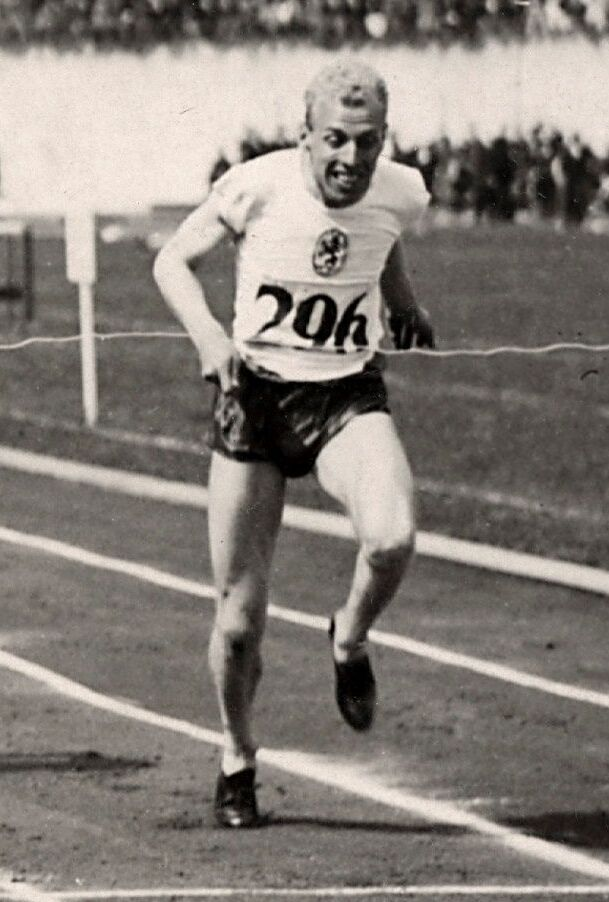

Medal record

Men's athletics

Representing the Netherlands
Bronze medal – third place	1924 Paris	4x100 metre relay

Jacob "Jaap" Boot (1 March 1903 in Wormerveer – 14 June 1986 in Dordrecht) was a Dutch athlete who competed mainly in the 100 metres and the long jump.

He competed for the Netherlands in the 1924 Summer Olympics held in Paris, France in the 4 x 100 metre relay where he won the bronze medal with his team mates Jan de Vries, Harry Broos and Marinus van den Berge. He also took part in the long jump event, but was eliminated in the series.

Boot was a Dutch national champion in the long jump in 1923, 1924, 1932 and 1933.
