= László Muskát =

Hungarian sprinter and hurdler

Personal information
- Nationality: Hungarian
- Born: 26 January 1903
- Died: 23 September 1966 (aged 63)

Sport
- Sport: Track and field
- Event(s): 100m, 110m hurdles

László Muskát (26 January 1903 – 23 September 1966) was a Hungarian sprinter and hurdler. He competed in three events at the 1924 Summer Olympics.

László began competing for MTK Budapest in 1919. He was the national sprint hurdles champion in 1924, and participated in the Paris Olympics that same year. After retiring from athletics, he opened a suitcase shop before opening the Emke Café in Budapest in 1940. Due to being Jewish, he was forced out of the café in 1944 and worked as an ambulance driver. After World War II, his former café was nationalized, so he took over the Pipacs Bar in its place. He worked at the Pipacs Bar for ten years until he was arrested and imprisoned for unclear reasons in 1958. After leaving prison as an old man, he continued to work at his bar until his death.
