= Zivan Smith =

South African Paralympic athlete

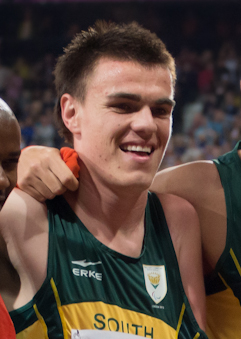
- Zivan Smith at the 2012 Summer Paralympics

Medal record

Track and field (athletics)

Representing South Africa

Paralympic Games
Gold medal – first place	2012 London	4 × 100 m – T42–46

Zivan Smith (born 31 October 1991 in Pretoria, South Africa) is a South African Paralympic athlete. Smith has the use of only one arm, and completes in the T46 class. He attends Tshwane University of Technology in South Africa.

At the 2012 Paralympic Games, Smith won a gold medal as part of the South African 4 × 100 m relay team in a world record time of 41.78 seconds.
