= Curt Wiberg =

Swedish sprinter

Personal information
- Nationality: Swedish
- Born: 15 October 1898 Malmö, Sweden
- Died: 22 November 1988 (aged 90) Malmö, Sweden

Sport
- Sport: Track and field
- Event: 100m

Curt Wiberg (15 October 1898 – 22 November 1988) was a Swedish sprinter. He competed in the men's 100 metres and the 4×100 metres relay events at the 1924 Summer Olympics.
