= Wilfred Nichol =

English sprinter (1901–1955)

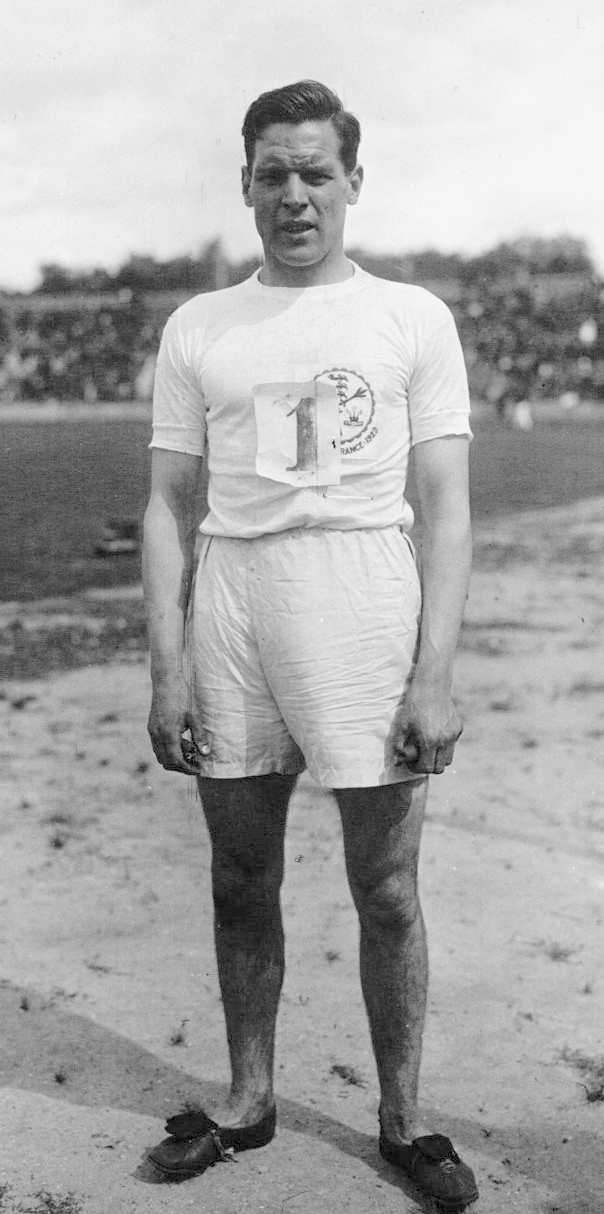
- Wilfred Nichol in 1923

Personal information
- Born: 29 May 1901 Newcastle upon Tyne, England
- Died: 8 February 1955 (aged 53) Wakefield, England

Sport
- Sport: Athletics
- Events: 100 m, 200 m
- Club: Highgate Harriers

Achievements and titles
- Personal bests: 100 m – 11.0 (1923/24); 200 m – 21.9 (1923)
Medal record
Representing United Kingdom
Olympic Games
Silver medal – second place	1924 Paris	4×100 m relay

Wilfred Paulin Nichol (29 May 1901 – 8 February 1955) was an English sprinter who competed at the 1924 Summer Olympics.

== Career ==
At the 1924 Olympic Games, he won a silver medal in the 4 × 100 m relay, together with Harold Abrahams, Walter Rangeley and Lancelot Royle, but failed to reach the finals of the individual 100 m and 200 m events.

Nichol placed second and third respectively at the Amateur Athletic Association of England (AAA) championships in the 100 yards and 220 yards events, at the 1923 AAA Championships. In the 100 yards final he was second to Eric Liddell, who set a new British record at 9.7 seconds. The following year at the 1924 AAA Championships, he once again finished second in the 100 yarsds, but this time to Harold Abrahams.

In 1926 Nichol became the first Honorary Secretary on the formation of Nottinghamshire AAA.
