= Bror Österdahl =

Swedish sprinter

Personal information
- Nationality: Swedish
- Born: 6 February 1900 Stockholm, Sweden
- Died: 25 April 1973 (aged 73) Stockholm, Sweden

Sport
- Sport: Track and field
- Event: 100m

Bror Österdahl (6 February 1900 – 25 April 1973) was a Swedish sprinter. He competed in the men's 100 metres and the 4×100 metres relay events at the 1924 Summer Olympics.
