= Pietro Pastorino =

Italian sprinter

Personal information
- Nationality: Italian
- Born: 2 November 1900
- Died: 2 October 1980 (aged 79)

Sport
- Sport: Sprinting
- Event: 200 metres

Pietro Pastorino (2 November 1900 – 2 October 1980) was an Italian sprinter. He competed in the men's 200 metres at the 1924 Summer Olympics.
