= Karl Borner =

Swiss sprinter

Personal information
- Nationality: Swiss
- Born: 6 September 1898 Olten, Switzerland
- Died: 6 November 1973 (aged 75) Lausanne, Switzerland

Sport
- Sport: Track and field
- Event(s): 100m, 200m

Karl Borner (6 September 1898 – 6 November 1973) was a Swiss sprinter. He competed in three events at the 1924 Summer Olympics. In the 200 metres, Borner finished in 3rd place out of 4 sprinters in Heat 4, failing to advance to the Quarterfinals.
