= Henri Thorsen =

Danish sprinter

Personal information
- Nationality: Danish
- Born: 19 October 1893 Copenhagen, Denmark
- Died: 4 September 1977 (aged 83) Copenhagen, Denmark

Sport
- Sport: Sprinting
- Event: 4 × 100 metres relay

Henri Thorsen (19 October 1893 – 4 September 1977) was a Danish sprinter. He competed in the 4 × 100 metres relay at the 1920 Summer Olympics and the 1924 Summer Olympics.
