= Poul Schiang =

Danish sprinter

Personal information
- Nationality: Danish
- Born: 23 May 1904 Copenhagen, Denmark
- Died: 25 May 1981 (aged 77) Sweden

Sport
- Sport: Track and field
- Events: 100m, 4x100m

Poul Schiang (23 May 1904 – 25 May 1981) was a Danish sprinter. He competed in the men's 100 metres and the 4 × 100 metres relay events at the 1924 Summer Olympics.
