= Frank Hussey =

American sprinter

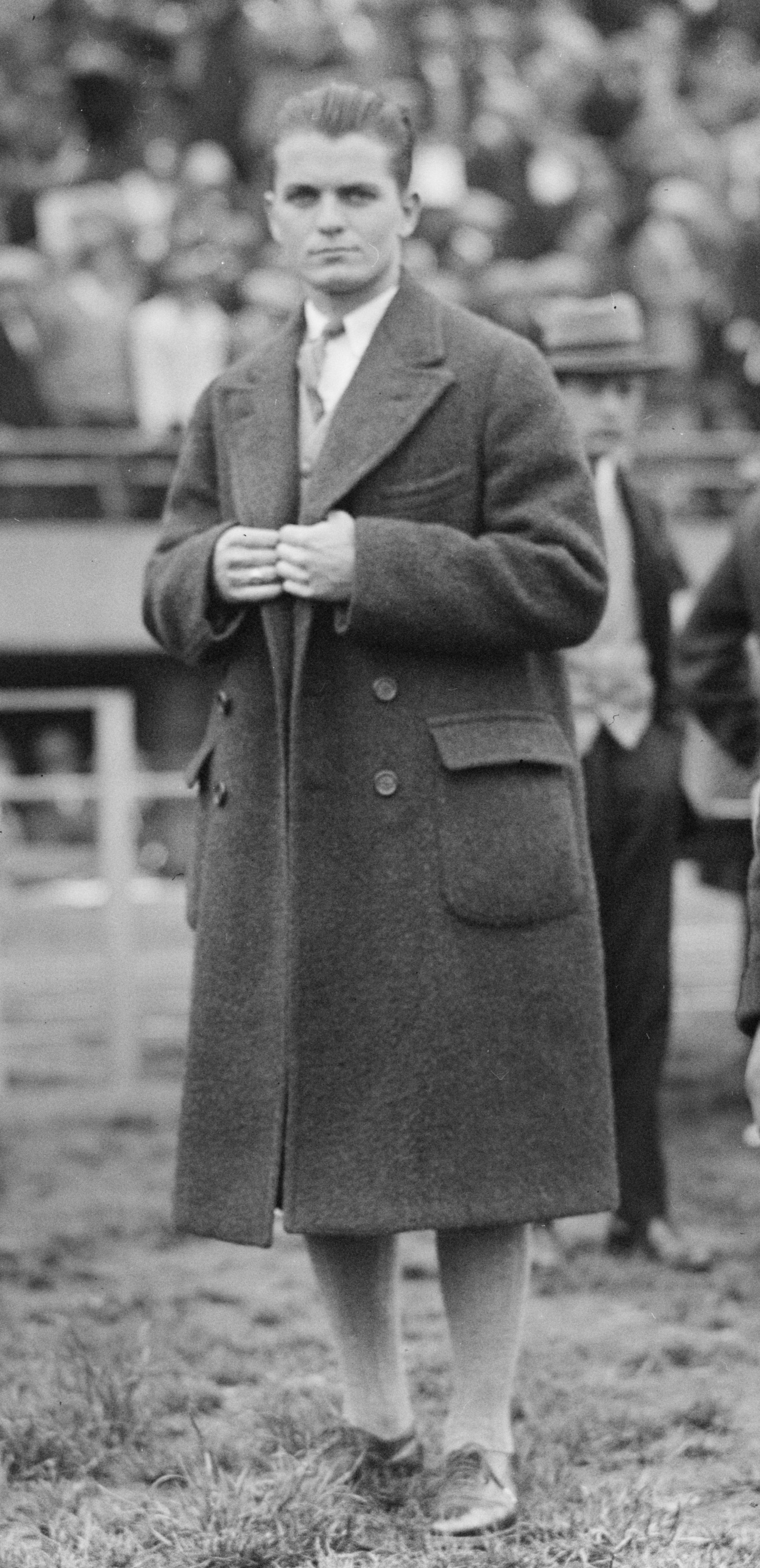
- Hussey at the 1924 Summer Olympics

Personal information
- Full name: Francis Valentine Joseph Hussey
- Born: February 14, 1905 New York City, U.S.
- Died: December 26, 1974 (aged 69) Coxsackie, New York, U.S.
- Height: 178 cm (5 ft 10 in)
- Weight: 70 kg (154 lb)

Sport
- Country: United States
- Sport: Athletics
- Events: 100 m, 100 yd
- Club: Stuyvesant High School

Achievements and titles
- Personal bests: 100 m – 10.7 (1924); 100 yd – 9.6 (1928)
Medal record
Men's athletics
Representing the United States
Olympic Games
Gold medal – first place	1924 Paris	4 × 100 m relay

Francis Valentine Joseph Hussey (February 14, 1905 – December 26, 1974) was an American sprint runner who won a gold medal in the 4 × 100 m relay at the 1924 Summer Olympics.

Frank Hussey, a schoolboy sensation from New York City's Stuyvesant High School, ran the third leg in the American 4 × 100 m relay team in Paris Olympics, which won the gold medal in a new world record of 41.0.

After returning from Paris, he attended Boston College and then Columbia University, and as a freshman became the leading Collegiate runner in America. He won the AAU championships in 100 yd (91 m) in 1925.

Although he was considered as a main favorite to gold medal in 100 m before the 1928 Summer Olympics, Hussey was eliminated in the heats of US Olympic Trials. After that he worked as a salesman, taught in the New York State Prison System, and served as an official at athletics events in his free time.

== See also ==
- List of people from Harlem
