= Louis Clarke (athlete) =

American sprinter

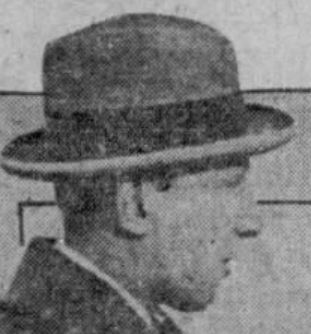
- Clarke in 1924

Personal information
- Full name: Louis Alfred Clarke
- Born: November 23, 1901 Statesville, North Carolina, U.S.
- Died: September 30, 1977 (aged 75) Fishkill, New York, U.S.
- Education: Johns Hopkins University
- Occupation: Chemist
- Employer: Texaco
- Height: 178 cm (5 ft 10 in)
- Weight: 70 kg (154 lb) (Olympics)
- Spouse: Olive Veazy
- Children: 1

Sport
- Club: Johns Hopkins Track; Fifth Regiment (Baltimore); Newark Athletic Club
Medal record
Men's athletics
Representing the United States
Olympic Games
Gold medal – first place	1924 Paris	4 × 100 m relay

Louis Alfred "Pinky" Clarke (November 23, 1901 – February 24, 1977) was an American chemist and former sprinter and track and field athlete, who won a gold medal in the world record time of 41.0 seconds in the 4 × 100 meter relay race at the 1924 Summer Olympics in Paris.

Clarke was Jewish. He was born in Statesville, North Carolina to Mr. and Mrs. Sol Clarke on November 23, 1901.

== College ==
After winning the AAU Junior 220-yard sprint in 1922, Clarke enrolled at Johns Hopkins University and finished second in the 100 yard and third in the 220-yard sprints at the 1923 annual IC4A (Intercollegiate Association of Amateur Athletes of America). In February 1924, he posted a world record of 9.8 seconds for the 100 yard indoors and later in the year placed third on both the 100-yard and 220-yard sprints at the IC4A.

He won the NCAA 100 yd (91 m) championship in 1923 while a student at Johns Hopkins.

In perhaps his most significant achievement in the Olympic year, Clarke also took the world indoor 100-yard record, at 9.8 seconds, in February 1924.

== Olympic gold medal ==
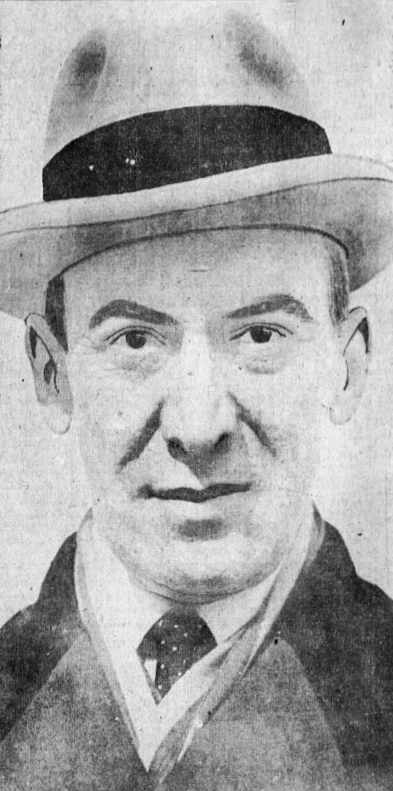
Coach Lawson Robertson

Clarke was trained for Olympic competition in May 1924 by the Olympic Coach and former American Olympic medalist Lawson Robertson at Franklin Field in Philadelphia. Robertson would later coach Jessie Owens in the 1936 Olympics. Clarke sailed for Cherbourg, France and then headed for Paris with the American Team that summer on the U.S.S America.

At the Paris Olympics that July, Clarke ran the second leg for the American 4 × 100-meter relay team, winning the gold medal in a new world record time of 41.0 seconds. Clarke had a 5-meter lead when he handed off the baton in the medal winning final, helping the U.S. Team to set the world record, in the same 41 second time they had run the semi-final. The British team finished a close second at 41.2 and included the Jewish sprinter and 100-meter champion Harold Abrahams. On their return to New York, the Olympic participants received medals from the Mayor of New York, and on their return to Baltimore, the Baltimore coaches and Olympians including Clarke marched in a parade in their Olympic uniforms and were presented medals by Baltimore's mayor.

In early 1925, Clarke briefly coached Track and Field at the Baltimore Y.M.H.A.

After completing College, Clarke continued to compete with the Newark Athletic Club, where in 1926, he was a member of the club's 4 × 100-meter team that captured the AAU National title and broke the world record (twice).

== Career after track ==
In April 1946, he notified the Greenwich Draft Board of his inactive status, having served as an Officer in the armed services with a commission.

He began work with the Texaco Company shortly after college in the mid-1920's and retired in 1966 as a chemist and patent liaison for Texaco where he had been employed for over forty years. In June 1936, he applied for and received a patent on a solvent extraction of hydrocarbon oil for which his company took full rights. In late 1963, Clarke was named Supervisor for Suggestion Activities, while serving as Senior Representative at the Texaco Research Center in Glenham, New York, a mile and a half Southeast of Fishkill.

Clarke died at Vassar Hospital, Poughkeepsie, New York, ten miles North of his home in Fishkill, New York on February 24, 1977, at the age of 75. He had been a member of the American Chemical Society. He was buried at Fishkill Rural Cemetery, and was survived by his widow Olive, a son, David who was a 1964 graduate of Dartmouth College, and two grandchildren.

== Honors ==
In 1994, he was inducted into the Johns Hopkins University Athletics Hall of Fame.

== See also ==
- List of select Jewish track and field athletes
