= Al LeConey =

American athlete

Olympic medal record

Men's athletics

Representing the United States
Gold medal – first place	1924 Paris	4 × 100 meter relay

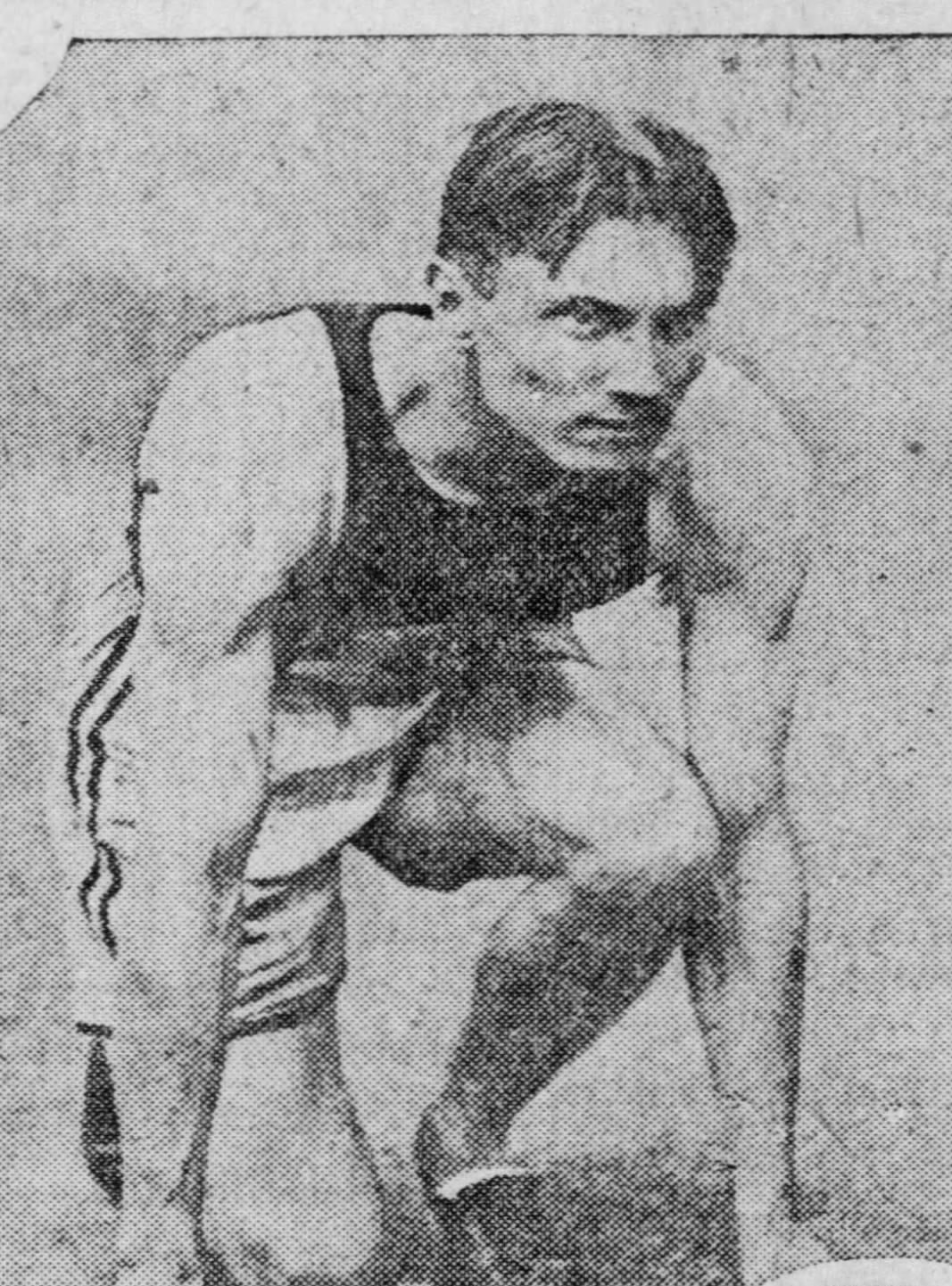
circa 1924 photograph of LeConey

Jeremiah Alfred LeConey (November 3, 1901 – November 11, 1959) was an American athlete, winner of the gold medal in the 4 × 100 meter relay race at the 1924 Summer Olympics.

LeConey was raised in Moorestown, New Jersey, where he first started showing his ability as a sprinter at Moorestown High School. In 1922, LeConey won the AAU championships in the 220 yard race and, as a Lafayette College (Class of 1923) student, the IC4A championships in both the 100 and 220 yard races.

At the 1924 Summer Olympics in Paris, Al LeConey ran the anchor leg for the American 4 × 100 meter relay team which won the gold medal with a world record time of 41.0 seconds.

After the Olympics, LeConey covered the 100 yard distance in 9.4 seconds, but the effort was later disallowed when judges ruled that the time was wind-aided. In 1932, LeConey received an unusual honor when a picture of him at the 1924 Olympics was used by the U.S. Post Office in developing a commemorative stamp.
