= Lancelot Royle =

British sprinter

Captain Sir Lancelot Royle KBE
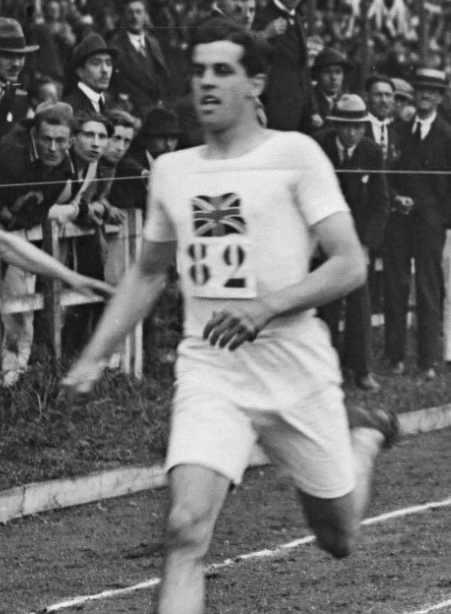

Personal information
- Born: 31 May 1898 Barnet, London, England
- Died: 19 June 1978 (aged 80) London, England

Sport
- Event: Sprints
- Club: Surrey AC
Medal record
Men's athletics
Representing Great Britain
Silver medal – second place	1924 Paris	4x100 metre relay

Captain Sir Lancelot Carrington Royle, KBE (31 May 1898 – 19 June 1978) was a British Olympian and businessman.

Royle was an Olympic athlete (Paris 1924) and chairman and CEO of Allied Suppliers Ltd., Home and Colonial Stores Ltd., Lipton Ltd., NAAFI and one of Britain's leading 20th century retail businessmen.

== Education ==
Lancelot Royle was the son of the Rev. Vernon Royle, the famous test cricketer, and grew up at Stanmore Park, north of London. He was educated at Harrow School and RMA Woolwich.

== Early career ==
Royle left Harrow in 1916 and was commissioned into the Royal Field Artillery and shipped out to France to fight in the First World War. He was to remain in the European theatre until the Armistice in 1918.

At the end of the war, Royle remained in the army, and was encouraged to develop his sporting prowess. He was a highly talented sprinter, competing regularly with the likes of Harold Abrahams and Eric Liddell for honours. He was British Army sprint Champion in 1920 and 1921, but resigned his commission as a lieutenant later the same year. He finished second behind Harry Edward in the 100 yards event at the 1922 AAA Championships.

In 1924, he represented Great Britain as part of the "Chariots of Fire" team in Paris. He won a silver medal in the 4 * 100 relay, in a team including Harold Abrahams. He was also a talented 200-meter sprinter, and it was he that gave up his spot to allow Eric Liddell to run the 200-metre race where Liddell won bronze.

== Business career ==
Royle began his business career with Unilever, joining Home and Colonial Stores in 1928. By the start of the Second World War, was regarded as one of the finest retail executives in the country. He rejoined the Royal Artillery, but was asked by the Prime Minister, Winston Churchill to be co-chairman of the Macharg/Royle Treasury Committee and then to take on the Chairmanship of NAAFI. He was to hold the Chairmanship for 12 years, during which time NAAFI developed into a global operation, serving British forces around the Empire. As chairman & CEO, he transformed Home and Colonial Stores into one of premier retail shopping destinations in the United Kingdom. He was invited to sit on the boards of British Match Corporation as deputy chairman, Wilkinson Sword, Bryant and May, Liebigs and Oxo among others. He was a Governor of Harrow School. He resigned his Royal Artillery commission as a captain in 1948.

He was made a Knight Commander of the Order of the British Empire (KBE) in 1944.

== Family ==
He married Barbara Haldin in 1922; they had two sons (Anthony Royle, later Baron Fanshawe of Richmond and Timothy Royle, founder of the Control Risks Group) and a daughter (Penelope Oldham). He died in 1978 aged 80.
