= Harry Broos =

Dutch sprinter (1898–1954)

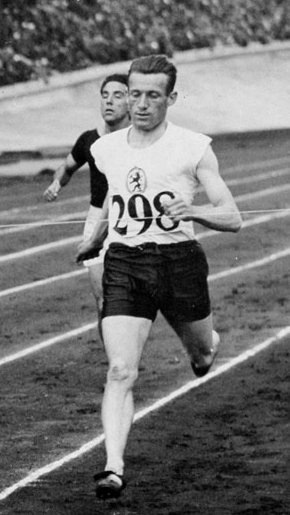
- Broos at the 1928 Olympics

Personal information
- Full name: Henricus Adrianus Broos
- Born: 25 May 1898 Roosendaal, the Netherlands
- Died: 16 July 1954 (aged 56) Eindhoven, the Netherlands

Sport
- Sport: Athletics
- Event: 400 m
- Club: PSV

Achievements and titles
- Personal bests: 100 m – 10.6 (1923); 200 m – 22.0 (1926); 400 m – 49.2 (1927)
Medal record
Representing the Netherlands
Olympic Games
Bronze medal – third place	1924 Paris	4×100 m relay

Henricus Adrianus "Harry" Broos (25 May 1898 – 16 July 1954) was a Dutch sprinter, who competed in the 100 m, 200 m, 400 m, 4 × 100 m and 4 × 400 m events at the 1924 and 1928 Summer Olympics. He won a bronze medal in the 4 × 100 m relay in 1924 and failed to reach the finals on all other occasions.

Broos won 12 Dutch national titles, at 100 m, 200 m and 400 m as well as one at the long jump.

== Football career ==
Besides running, between 1922 and 1925 Broos played 23 football matches for PSV Eindhoven. After retiring from competitions he worked as a football administrator at PSV. He also played football for UVV in Utrecht after joining them from hometown club Alliance in 1920.

== Personal life ==
Broos was married to Nelly Ligthart, who was a daughter of PSV administrator Harrie Lighthart.
