= 4 × 400 metres relay at the Olympics =

4 × 400 metres relay at the Olympic Games
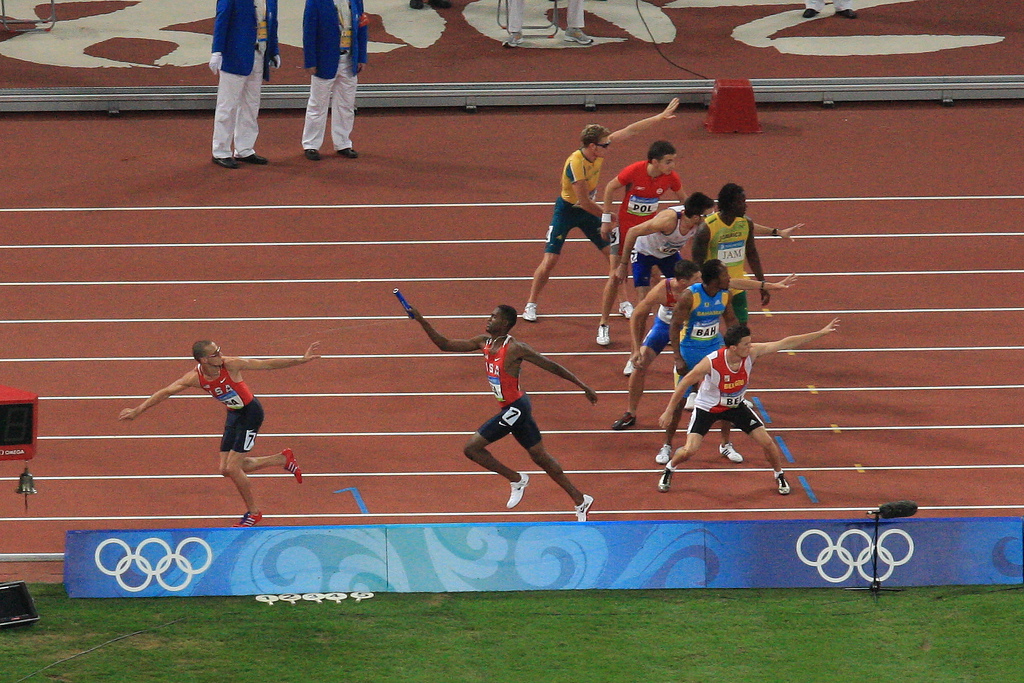
- The 2008 Olympic men's 4 × 400 m relay final

Overview
- Sport: Athletics
- Gender: Men, Women and Mixed
- Years held: Men: 1912–2024; Women: 1972–2024; Mixed: 2020–2024

Olympic record
- Men: United States (Christopher Bailey, Vernon Norwood, Bryce Deadmon, Rai Benjamin) 2:54.43 (2024)
- Women: Soviet Union (Tatyana Ledovskaya, Olga Nazarova, Mariya Pinigina, Olga Bryzgina) 3:15.17 (1988)
- Mixed: United States (Vernon Norwood (M), Shamier Little (F), Bryce Deadmon (M), Kaylyn Brown (F)) 3:07.41 (2024)

Reigning champion
- Men: United States (Christopher Bailey, Vernon Norwood, Bryce Deadmon, Rai Benjamin)
- Women: United States (Shamier Little, Sydney McLaughlin-Levrone, Gabby Thomas, Alexis Holmes, Quanera Hayes*, Aaliyah Butler*, Kaylyn Brown*)
- Mixed: Netherlands (Eugene Omalla, Lieke Klaver, Isaya Klein Ikkink, Femke Bol, Cathelijn Peeters*); *Indicates the athlete only competed in the preliminary heats.

The 4 × 400 metres relay at the Summer Olympics is the longest track relay event held at the multi-sport event. The men's relay has been present on the Olympic athletics programme since 1912 and the women's event has been continuously held since the 1972 Olympics. The inaugural mixed 4 × 400 metres relay was held at the 2020 Olympics. It is the most prestigious 4 × 400 m relay race at the elite level. At the 1908 Summer Olympics, a precursor to this event was held – the 1600 m medley relay. This event, with two legs of 200 m, one of 400 m, and a final leg of 800 m, was the first track relay in Olympic history.

The competition has two parts: a first round and an eight-team final. Historically, there was a semi-final round, but this has been eliminated as selection is now determined by time, with the sixteen fastest nations during a pre-Olympic qualification period are entered.

Since 1984, teams may enter up to eight athletes for the event. Larger nations typically have up to four reserve runners in the first round in order to preserve the fitness of their top runners for the final. Heat runners of medal-winning teams receive medals even if they did not run in the final.

The Olympic records for the event are 2:54.43 for men, set by the United States in 2024; 3:15.17 for women, set by the Soviet Union in 1988 and 3:07.41 in mixed relay, set by the United States in 2024. The women's record is also the world record for the 4 × 400 metres relay. The first two women's Olympic finals (1972 and 1976) resulted in new world records for the winning East German teams. The men's world record has been profoundly shaped by Olympic competition with ten records set (1912, 1924, 1928, 1932, 1952, 1960, 1964, 1968, 1988, and 1992): the record has only been broken twice in a 4 × 400 m relay race outside of the multi-sport event.

The United States is by far the most successful nation in the event. The country has won the men's race 18 times and the women's race seven times. As of 2024, no other country has won more than three golds in the event. Great Britain (two wins, thirteen medals), Jamaica (one win, eight medals) and the Soviet Union (three wins, four medals) are the next most successful nations.

Participants in this event are often competitors in the 400 metres and 400 metres hurdles individual Olympic events (and, less commonly, the 800 metres and 200 metres).

Allyson Felix is the most successful athlete in the event, having four straight wins from 2008 to 2020. Steve Lewis, Jeremy Wariner, Bryce Deadmon and Rai Benjamin are the only men to win the title twice, and Chris Brown is the only man to reach the podium three times.

== Medal summary ==
=== Men ===
Games	Gold	Silver	Bronze
1912 Stockholm	United States; Mel Sheppard; Edward Lindberg; Ted Meredith; Charles Reidpath	France; Charles Lelong; Robert Schurrer; Pierre Failliot; Charles Poulenard	Great Britain; George Nicol; Ernest Henley; James Soutter; Cyril Seedhouse
1920 Antwerp	Great Britain; Cecil Griffiths; Robert Lindsay; John Ainsworth-Davis; Guy Butler	South Africa; Henry Dafel; Clarence Oldfield; Jack Oosterlaak; Bevil Rudd	France; Géo André; Gaston Féry; Maurice Delvart; André Devaux
1924 Paris	United States; Commodore Cochran; Alan Helffrich; Oliver Macdonald; William Stevenson	Sweden; Artur Svensson; Erik Byléhn; Gustaf Wejnarth; Nils Engdahl	Great Britain; Edward Toms; George Renwick; Richard Ripley; Guy Butler
1928 Amsterdam	United States; George Baird; Emerson Spencer; Fred Alderman; Ray Barbuti	Germany; Otto Neumann; Harry Werner Storz; Richard Krebs; Hermann Engelhard	Canada; Alex Wilson; Phil Edwards; Stanley Glover; James Ball
1932 Los Angeles	United States; Ivan Fuqua; Ed Ablowich; Karl Warner; Bill Carr	Great Britain; Crew Stoneley; Tommy Hampson; David Burghley; Godfrey Rampling	Canada; Ray Lewis; James Ball; Phil Edwards; Alex Wilson
1936 Berlin	Great Britain; Freddie Wolff; Godfrey Rampling; Bill Roberts; Godfrey Brown	United States; Harold Cagle; Robert Young; Edward O’Brien; Al Fitch	Germany; Helmut Hamann; Friedrich von Stülpnagel; Harry Voigt; Rudolf Harbig
1948 London	United States; Arthur Harnden; Cliff Bourland; Roy Cochran; Mal Whitfield	France; Jean Kerebel; Francis Schewetta; Robert Chef d'Hôtel; Jacques Lunis	Sweden; Kurt Lundquist; Lars-Erik Wolfbrandt; Folke Alnevik; Rune Larsson
1952 Helsinki	Jamaica; Arthur Wint; Leslie Laing; Herb McKenley; George Rhoden	United States; Ollie Matson; Gene Cole; Charles Moore; Mal Whitfield	Germany; Hans Geister; Günther Steines; Heinz Ulzheimer; Karl-Friedrich Haas
1956 Melbourne	United States; Lou Jones; Jesse Mashburn; Charles Jenkins; Tom Courtney	Australia; Leon Gregory; David Lean; Kevan Gosper; Graham Gipson	Great Britain; Peter Higgins; Michael Wheeler; John Salisbury; Derek Johnson
1960 Rome	United States; Jack Yerman; Earl Young; Glenn Davis; Otis Davis	United Team of Germany; Hans-Joachim Reske; Manfred Kinder; Johannes Kaiser; Carl Kaufmann	British West Indies; Malcolm Spence; Jim Wedderburn; Keith Gardner; George Kerr
1964 Tokyo	United States; Ollan Cassell; Mike Larrabee; Ulis Williams; Henry Carr	Great Britain; Tim Graham; Adrian Metcalfe; John Cooper; Robbie Brightwell	Trinidad and Tobago; Edwin Skinner; Kent Bernard; Edwin Roberts; Wendell Mottley
1968 Mexico City	United States; Vincent Matthews; Ron Freeman; Larry James; Lee Evans	Kenya; Daniel Rudisha; Munyoro Nyamau; Naftali Bon; Charles Asati	West Germany; Helmar Müller; Manfred Kinder; Gerhard Hennige; Martin Jellinghaus
1972 Munich	Kenya; Charles Asati; Munyoro Nyamau; Robert Ouko; Julius Sang	Great Britain; Martin Reynolds; Alan Pascoe; David Hemery; David Jenkins	France; Gilles Bertould; Daniel Velasques; Francis Kerbiriou; Jacques Carette
1976 Montreal	United States; Herman Frazier; Benny Brown; Fred Newhouse; Maxie Parks	Poland; Ryszard Podlas; Jan Werner; Zbigniew Jaremski; Jerzy Pietrzyk	West Germany; Franz-Peter Hofmeister; Lothar Krieg; Harald Schmid; Bernd Herrmann
1980 Moscow	Soviet Union; Remigijus Valiulis; Mikhail Linge; Nikolay Chernetskiy; Viktor Markin	East Germany; Klaus Thiele; Andreas Knebel; Frank Schaffer; Volker Beck	Italy; Stefano Malinverni; Mauro Zuliani; Roberto Tozzi; Pietro Mennea
1984 Los Angeles	United States; Sunder Nix; Ray Armstead; Alonzo Babers; Antonio McKay	Great Britain; Kriss Akabusi; Garry Cook; Todd Bennett; Phil Brown	Nigeria; Sunday Uti; Moses Ugbisien; Rotimi Peters; Innocent Egbunike
1988 Seoul	United States; Danny Everett; Steve Lewis; Kevin Robinzine; Butch Reynolds	Jamaica; Howard Davis; Devon Morris; Winthrop Graham; Bert Cameron	West Germany; Norbert Dobeleit; Edgar Itt; Jörg Vaihinger; Ralf Lübke
1992 Barcelona	United States; Andrew Valmon; Quincy Watts; Michael Johnson; Steve Lewis; Darnell Hall; Charles Jenkins Jr.	Cuba; Lázaro Martínez; Héctor Herrera; Norberto Téllez; Roberto Hernández	Great Britain; Roger Black; David Grindley; Kriss Akabusi; John Regis; Du'aine Ladejo; Mark Richardson
1996 Atlanta	United States; LaMont Smith; Alvin Harrison; Derek Mills; Anthuan Maybank; Jason Rouser	Great Britain; Iwan Thomas; Jamie Baulch; Mark Richardson; Roger Black; Du'aine Ladejo; Mark Hylton	Jamaica; Michael McDonald; Roxbert Martin; Greg Haughton; Davian Clarke; Dennis Blake; Garth Robinson
2000 Sydney	Nigeria; Clement Chukwu; Jude Monye; Sunday Bada; Enefiok Udo-Obong; Nduka Awazie; Fidelis Gadzama	Jamaica; Michael Blackwood; Greg Haughton; Christopher Williams; Danny McFarlane; Sanjay Ayre; Michael McDonald	Bahamas; Avard Moncur; Troy McIntosh; Carl Oliver; Chris Brown
2004 Athens	United States; Otis Harris; Derrick Brew; Jeremy Wariner; Darold Williamson; Kelly Willie; Andrew Rock	Australia; John Steffensen; Mark Ormrod; Patrick Dwyer; Clinton Hill	Nigeria; James Godday; Musa Audu; Saul Weigopwa; Enefiok Udo-Obong
2008 Beijing	United States; LaShawn Merritt; Angelo Taylor; David Neville; Jeremy Wariner; Kerron Clement; Reggie Witherspoon	Bahamas; Andretti Bain; Michael Mathieu; Andrae Williams; Chris Brown; Avard Moncur; Ramon Miller	Great Britain; Martyn Rooney; Andrew Steele; Robert Tobin; Michael Bingham
2012 London	Bahamas; Chris Brown; Michael Mathieu; Ramon Miller; Demetrius Pinder	United States; Joshua Mance; Manteo Mitchell; Tony McQuay; Bryshon Nellum; Angelo Taylor	Trinidad and Tobago; Ade Alleyne-Forte; Lalonde Gordon; Deon Lendore; Jarrin Solomon
2016 Rio de Janeiro	United States; Arman Hall; Tony McQuay; Gil Roberts; LaShawn Merritt; Kyle Clemons*; David Verburg*	Jamaica; Peter Matthews; Nathon Allen; Fitzroy Dunkley; Javon Francis; Rusheen McDonald*	Bahamas; Alonzo Russell; Michael Mathieu; Steven Gardiner; Chris Brown; Stephen Newbold*
2020 Tokyo	United States; Michael Cherry; Michael Norman; Bryce Deadmon; Rai Benjamin; Trevor Stewart*; Randolph Ross*; Vernon Norwood*	Netherlands; Liemarvin Bonevacia; Terrence Agard; Tony van Diepen; Ramsey Angela; Jochem Dobber*	Botswana; Isaac Makwala; Baboloki Thebe; Zibane Ngozi; Bayapo Ndori
2024 Paris	United States; Christopher Bailey; Vernon Norwood; Bryce Deadmon; Rai Benjamin; Quincy Wilson*	Botswana; Bayapo Ndori; Busang Collen Kebinatshipi; Anthony Pesela; Letsile Tebogo	Great Britain; Alex Haydock-Wilson; Matthew Hudson-Smith; Lewis Davey; Charlie Dobson; Samuel Reardon*; Toby Harries*
2028 Los Angeles			

Note: * Indicates athletes who ran in preliminary rounds and also received medals.

The world record is World Athletics Relays Records 2:57.25 T. Robinson Stadium, Nassau (BAB)

==== Multiple medalists ====
Rank	Athlete	Nation	Olympics	Gold	Silver	Bronze	Total
1=	Steve Lewis	United States	1988–1992	2	0	0	2
1=	Jeremy Wariner	United States	2004–2008	2	0	0	2
1=	LaShawn Merritt	United States	2008, 2016	2	0	0	2
1=	Rai Benjamin	United States	2021–2024	2	0	0	2
1=	Bryce Deadmon	United States	2021–2024	2	0	0	2
6	Chris Brown	Bahamas	2000, 2008–2016	1	1	2	4
7	Michael Mathieu	Bahamas	2008–2012	1	1	1	3
8=	Godfrey Rampling	Great Britain	1932–1936	1	1	0	2
8=	Mal Whitfield	United States	1948–1952	1	1	0	2
8=	Charles Asati	Kenya	1968–1972	1	1	0	2
8=	Munyoro Nyamau	Kenya	1968–1972	1	1	0	2
8=	Ramon Miller	Bahamas	2008–2012	1	1	0	2
8=	Angelo Taylor	United States	2008–2012	1	1	0	2
14=	Guy Butler	Great Britain	1920–1924	1	0	1	2
14=	Enefiok Udo-Obong	Nigeria	2000–2004	1	0	1	2
16=	Mark Richardson	Great Britain	1992–1996	0	1	1	2
16=	Roger Black	Great Britain	1992–1996	0	1	1	2
16=	Du'aine Ladejo	Great Britain	1992–1996	0	1	1	2
16=	Avard Moncur	Bahamas	2000–2008	0	1	1	2
16=	Bayapo Ndori	Botswana	2020–2024	0	1	1	2

==== Medals by country ====
Rank	Nation	Gold	Silver	Bronze	Total
1	United States	19	3	0	22
2	Great Britain	2	5	6	13
3	Jamaica	1	3	1	5
4	Bahamas	1	1	2	4
5	Kenya	1	1	0	2
6	Nigeria	1	0	2	3
7	Soviet Union	1	0	0	1
8=	France	0	2	2	4
8=	Germany^{[nb]}	0	2	2	4
10	Australia	0	2	0	2
11=	Sweden	0	1	1	2
11=	Botswana	0	1	1	2
13=	Cuba	0	1	0	1
13=	East Germany	0	1	0	1
13=	Netherlands	0	1	0	1
13=	Poland	0	1	0	1
13=	South Africa	0	1	0	1
18	West Germany	0	0	3	3
19=	Canada	0	0	2	2
19=	Trinidad and Tobago	0	0	2	2
21=	British West Indies	0	0	1	1
21=	Italy	0	0	1	1

- ^{nb} The German total includes teams both competing as Germany and the United Team of Germany, but not East or West Germany.

=== Women ===
Games	Gold	Silver	Bronze
1972 Munich	East Germany; Dagmar Käsling; Rita Kühne; Helga Seidler; Monika Zehrt	United States; Mable Fergerson; Madeline Manning; Cheryl Toussaint; Kathy Hammond	West Germany; Anette Rückes; Inge Bödding; Hildegard Falck; Rita Wilden
1976 Montreal	East Germany; Doris Maletzki; Brigitte Rohde; Ellen Streidt; Christina Brehmer	United States; Debra Sapenter; Sheila Ingram; Pamela Jiles; Rosalyn Bryant	Soviet Union; Inta Kļimoviča; Lyudmila Aksyonova; Natalya Sokolova; Nadezhda Ilyina
1980 Moscow	Soviet Union; Tatyana Prorochenko; Tatyana Goyshchik; Nina Zyuskova; Irina Nazarova	East Germany; Gabriele Löwe; Barbara Krug; Christina Lathan; Marita Koch	Great Britain; Linsey MacDonald; Michelle Probert; Joslyn Hoyte-Smith; Donna Hartley
1984 Los Angeles	United States; Lillie Leatherwood; Sherri Howard; Valerie Brisco-Hooks; Chandra Cheeseborough; Diane Dixon*; Denean Howard*	Canada; Charmaine Crooks; Jillian Richardson; Molly Killingbeck; Marita Payne; Dana Wright*	West Germany; Heike Schulte-Mattler; Ute Thimm; Heidi-Elke Gaugel; Gaby Bußmann
1988 Seoul	Soviet Union; Tatyana Ledovskaya; Olga Nazarova; Mariya Pinigina; Olha Bryzhina; Lyudmyla Dzhyhalova*	United States; Denean Howard; Diane Dixon; Valerie Brisco-Hooks; Florence Griffith Joyner; Sherri Howard*; Lillie Leatherwood*	East Germany; Dagmar Neubauer-Rübsam; Kirsten Emmelmann; Sabine Busch; Petra Müller; Grit Breuer*
1992 Barcelona	Unified Team; Yelena Ruzina; Lyudmyla Dzhyhalova; Olga Nazarova; Olha Bryzhina; Marina Shmonina*; Liliya Nurutdinova*	United States; Natasha Kaiser-Brown; Gwen Torrence; Jearl Miles; Rochelle Stevens; Denean Howard-Hill*; Dannette Young*	Great Britain; Phylis Smith; Sandra Douglas; Jennifer Stoute; Sally Gunnell
1996 Atlanta	United States; Rochelle Stevens; Maicel Malone; Kim Graham; Jearl Miles; Linetta Wilson*	Nigeria; Olabisi Afolabi; Fatima Yusuf; Charity Opara; Falilat Ogunkoya	Germany; Uta Rohländer; Linda Kisabaka; Anja Rücker; Grit Breuer
2000 Sydney	United States; Jearl Miles Clark; Monique Hennagan; LaTasha Colander; ~~Marion Jones~~^{[nb1]} Andrea Anderson*	Jamaica; Sandie Richards; Catherine Scott; Deon Hemmings; Lorraine Graham; Charmaine Howell*; Michelle Burgher*	Russia; Yuliya Sotnikova; Svetlana Goncharenko; Olga Kotlyarova; Irina Privalova; Natalya Nazarova*; Olesya Zykina*
2004 Athens	United States; DeeDee Trotter; Monique Henderson; Sanya Richards; Monique Hennagan; ~~Crystal Cox~~^{[nb2]}* Moushaumi Robinson*	Russia; Olesya Krasnomovets; Natalya Nazarova; Olesya Zykina; Natalya Antyukh; Tatyana Firova*; Natalya Ivanova*	Jamaica; Novlene Williams; Michelle Burgher; Nadia Davy; Sandie Richards; Ronetta Smith*
2008 Beijing^{[a]}	United States; Mary Wineberg; Allyson Felix; Monique Henderson; Sanya Richards; Natasha Hastings*	Jamaica; Shericka Williams; Shereefa Lloyd; Rosemarie Whyte; Novlene Williams; Bobby-Gaye Wilkins*	Great Britain; Christine Ohuruogu; Kelly Sotherton; Marilyn Okoro; Nicola Sanders
2012 London^{[b]}	United States; DeeDee Trotter; Allyson Felix; Francena McCorory; Sanya Richards-Ross; Keshia Baker*; Diamond Dixon*	Jamaica; Christine Day; Rosemarie Whyte; Shericka Williams; Novlene Williams-Mills; Shereefa Lloyd*; ~~Dominique Blake~~^{[nb3]}	Ukraine; Alina Lohvynenko; Olha Zemlyak; Hanna Yaroshchuk; Nataliya Pyhyda
2016 Rio de Janeiro	United States; Allyson Felix; Phyllis Francis; Natasha Hastings; Courtney Okolo; Taylor Ellis-Watson*; Francena McCorory*	Jamaica; Stephenie Ann McPherson; Anneisha McLaughlin-Whilby; Shericka Jackson; Novlene Williams-Mills; Christine Day*; Chrisann Gordon*	Great Britain; Eilidh Doyle; Anyika Onuora; Emily Diamond; Christine Ohuruogu; Kelly Massey*
2020 Tokyo	United States; Sydney McLaughlin; Allyson Felix; Dalilah Muhammad; Athing Mu; Kendall Ellis*; Lynna Irby*; Wadeline Jonathas*; Kaylin Whitney*	Poland; Natalia Kaczmarek; Iga Baumgart-Witan; Małgorzata Hołub-Kowalik; Justyna Święty-Ersetic; Anna Kiełbasińska*	Jamaica; Roneisha McGregor; Janieve Russell; Shericka Jackson; Candice McLeod; Junelle Bromfield*; Stacey-Ann Williams*
2024 Paris	United States; Shamier Little; Sydney McLaughlin-Levrone; Gabby Thomas; Alexis Holmes; Quanera Hayes*; Aaliyah Butler*; Kaylyn Brown*	Netherlands; Lieke Klaver; Cathelijn Peeters; Lisanne de Witte; Femke Bol; Eveline Saalberg*; Myrte van der Schoot*	Great Britain; Victoria Ohuruogu; Laviai Nielsen; Nicole Yeargin; Amber Anning; Yemi Mary John*; Hannah Kelly*; Jodie Williams*; Lina Nielsen*
2028 Los Angeles			

Note: * Indicates athletes who ran in preliminary rounds and also received medals.

- ^{nb1} Marion Jones was stripped of her Olympic medal in 2000.
- ^{nb2} Crystal Cox was stripped of her Olympic medal in 2004.
- ^{nb3} Dominique Blake was accidentally given her Olympic medal and she returned it in 2017.
- ^{a} Original silver medalists, Russia, and 4th place finishers, Belarus, were stripped of their results for doping offenses. Following reallocation, Jamaica were promoted to the silver medal, and Great Britain to the bronze.
- ^{b} Original silver medalists, Russia, were stripped of their medal for doping offenses. Following reallocation, Jamaica will be promoted to the silver medal, and Ukraine to the bronze.

==== Multiple medalists ====
Rank	Athlete	Nation	Olympics	Gold	Silver	Bronze	Total
1	Allyson Felix	United States	2008–2021	4	0	0	4
2	Sanya Richards-Ross	United States	2004–2012	3	0	0	3
3	Jearl Miles-Clark	United States	1992–2000	2	1	0	3
4=	Olga Nazarova	Soviet Union; Unified Team	1988–1992	2	0	0	2
4=	Olga Bryzgina	Soviet Union; Unified Team	1988–1992	2	0	0	2
4=	Lyudmila Dzhigalova	Soviet Union; Unified Team	1988–1992	2	0	0	2
4=	Monique Hennagan	United States	2000–2004	2	0	0	2
4=	Monique Henderson	United States	2004–2008	2	0	0	2
4=	DeeDee Trotter	United States	2004–2012	2	0	0	2
4=	Natasha Hastings	United States	2008–2016	2	0	0	2
4=	Francena McCorory	United States	2012–2016	2	0	0	2
4=	Sydney McLaughlin-Levrone	United States	2021–2024	2	0	0	2
13	Denean Howard-Hill	United States	1984–1992	1	2	0	3
14=	Christina Lathan	East Germany	1976–1980	1	1	0	2
14=	Lillie Leatherwood	United States	1984–1988	1	1	0	2
14=	Sherri Howard	United States	1984–1988	1	1	0	2
14=	Valerie Brisco-Hooks	United States	1984–1988	1	1	0	2
14=	Diane Dixon	United States	1984–1988	1	1	0	2
14=	Rochelle Stevens	United States	1992–1996	1	1	0	2
20	Novlene Williams-Mills	Jamaica	2004–2016	0	3	1	4
21=	Shereefa Lloyd	Jamaica	2008–2012	0	2	0	2
21=	Rosemarie Whyte	Jamaica	2008–2012	0	2	0	2
21=	Shericka Williams	Jamaica	2008–2012	0	2	0	2
21=	Christine Day	Jamaica	2012–2016	0	2	0	2
25=	Sandie Richards	Jamaica	2000–2004	0	1	1	2
25=	Natalya Nazarova	Russia	2000–2004	0	1	1	2
25=	Olesya Zykina	Russia	2000–2004	0	1	1	2
25=	Michelle Burgher	Jamaica	2000–2004	0	1	1	2
25=	Shericka Jackson	Jamaica	2016-2020	0	1	1	2
30=	Grit Breuer	East Germany; Germany	1988–1996	0	0	2	2
30=	Christine Ohuruogu	Great Britain	2008–2016	0	0	2	2

==== Medalists by country ====
Rank	Nation	Gold	Silver	Bronze	Total
1	United States	9	4	0	13
2	East Germany	2	1	1	4
3	Soviet Union	2	0	1	3
4	Unified Team	1	0	0	1
5	Jamaica	0	4	2	6
6	Russia	0	1	1	2
7=	Canada	0	1	0	1
7=	Nigeria	0	1	0	1
7=	Poland	0	1	0	1
7=	Netherlands	0	1	0	1
11	Great Britain	0	0	5	5
12	West Germany	0	0	2	2
13=	Germany	0	0	1	1
13=	Ukraine	0	0	1	1

=== Mixed ===
Games	Gold	Silver	Bronze
2020 Tokyo	Poland; Karol Zalewski; Natalia Kaczmarek; Justyna Święty-Ersetic; Kajetan Duszyński; Dariusz Kowaluk*; Iga Baumgart-Witan*; Małgorzata Hołub-Kowalik*	Dominican Republic; Lidio Andrés Feliz; Marileidy Paulino; Anabel Medina; Alexander Ogando; Luguelín Santos*	United States; Trevor Stewart; Kendall Ellis; Kaylin Whitney; Vernon Norwood; Elija Godwin*; Lynna Irby*; Taylor Manson*; Bryce Deadmon*
2024 Paris	Netherlands; Eugene Omalla; Lieke Klaver; Isaya Klein Ikkink; Femke Bol; Cathelijn Peeters*	United States; Vernon Norwood; Shamier Little; Bryce Deadmon; Kaylyn Brown	Great Britain; Sam Reardon; Laviai Nielsen; Alex Haydock-Wilson; Amber Anning; Nicole Yeargin*

Note: * Indicates athletes who ran only in the preliminary round and also received medals.

==== Medalists by country ====
Medalists by country
Rank	Nation	Gold	Silver	Bronze	Total
1	Poland	1	0	0	1
1	Netherlands	1	0	0	1
3	United States	0	1	1	2
4	Dominican Republic	0	1	0	1
5	Great Britain	0	0	1	1

== 1908 Olympic medley relay ==
Games	Gold	Silver	Bronze
1908 London	United States; William Hamilton; Nate Cartmell; John Taylor; Mel Sheppard	Germany; Arthur Hoffmann; Hans Eicke; Otto Trieloff; Hanns Braun	Hungary; Pál Simon; Frigyes Wiesner; József Nagy; Ödön Bodor

== Top ten fastest Olympic times ==
Fastest men's times at the Olympics
Rank	Time (sec)	Nation	Athletes	Games	Round	Date
1	2:54.43	United States (USA)	Christopher Bailey, Vernon Norwood, Bryce Deadmon, Rai Benjamin	2024	Final	10 August
2	2:54.53	Botswana (BOT)	Bayapo Ndori, Busang Kebinatshipi, Anthony Pesela, Letsile Tebogo	2024	Final	10 August
3	2:55.39	United States (USA)	LaShawn Merritt, Angelo Taylor, David Neville, Jeremy Wariner	2008	Final	23 August
4	2:55.70	United States (USA)	Michael Cherry, Michael Norman, Bryce Deadmon, Rai Benjamin	2020	Final	7 August
5	2:55.74	United States (USA)	Andrew Valmon, Quincy Watts, Michael Johnson, Steve Lewis	1992	Final	8 August
6	2:55.83	Great Britain (GBR)	Alex Haydock-Wilson, Matthew Hudson-Smith, Lewis Davey, Charlie Dobson	2024	Final	10 August
7	2:55.91	United States (USA)	Otis Harris, Derrick Brew, Jeremy Wariner, Darold Williamson	2004	Final	28 August
8	2:55.99	United States (USA)	LaMont Smith, Alvin Harrison, Derek Mills, Anthuan Maybank	1996	Final	3 August
9	2:56.16	United States (USA)	Vincent Matthews, Ronald Freeman, Larry James, Lee Evans	1968	Final	10 October
9	2:56.16	United States (USA)	Danny Everett, Steve Lewis, Kevin Robinzine, Harry Reynolds	1988	Final	1 October

Fastest women's times at the Olympics
Rank	Time (sec)	Nation	Athletes	Games	Round	Date
1	3:15.17	Soviet Union (URS)	Tatyana Ledovskaya, Olga Nazarova, Mariya Pinigina, Olga Bryzgina	1988	Final	1 October
2	3:15.27	United States (USA)	Shamier Little, Sydney McLaughlin-Levrone, Gabby Thomas, Alexis Holmes	2024	Final	10 August
3	3:15.51	United States (USA)	Denean Hill, Diane Dixon, Valerie Brisco-Hooks, Florence Griffith Joyner	1988	Final	1 October
4	3:16.85	United States (USA)	Sydney McLaughlin, Allyson Felix, Dalilah Muhammad, Athing Mu	2020	Final	7 August
5	3:16.87	United States (USA)	DeeDee Trotter, Allyson Felix, Francena McCorory, Sanya Richards-Ross	2012	Final	10 August
6	3:18.29	United States (USA)	Lillie Leatherwood, Sherri Howard, Valerie Brisco-Hooks, Chandra Cheeseborough	1984	Final	11 August
6	3:18.29	East Germany (GDR)	Dagmar Neubauer, Kirsten Emmelmann, Sabine Busch, Petra Schersing	1988	Final	1 October
8	3:18.54	United States (USA)	Mary Wineberg, Allyson Felix, Monique Henderson, Sanya Richards	2008	Final	23 August
9	3:19.01	United States (USA)	DeeDee Trotter, Monique Henderson, Sanya Richards, Monique Hennagan	2004	Final	28 August
10	3:19.06	United States (USA)	Courtney Okolo, Natasha Hastings, Phyllis Francis, Allyson Felix	2016	Final	20 August
