= Athletics at the 1924 Summer Olympics – Men's 400 metres =

Men's 400 metres at the Games of the VIII Olympiad
- Venue: Stade Olympique Yves-du-Manoir
- Dates: July 10, 1924 (heats and quarterfinals); July 11, 1924 (semifinals and final)
- Competitors: 60 from 27 nations
- Winning time: 47.6 WR

Medalists
1st place, gold medalist(s)		Eric Liddell; Great Britain
2nd place, silver medalist(s)		Horatio Fitch; United States
3rd place, bronze medalist(s)		Guy Butler; Great Britain

Official Video

The men's 400 metres event was part of the track and field athletics programme at the 1924 Summer Olympics. This race was depicted in the film Chariots of Fire. The competition was held on Thursday, July 10, 1924, and on Friday, July 11, 1924.

As for all other races the track was 500 metres in circumference.

Sixty runners from 27 nations competed. No nation had more than 4 athletes.

== Background ==
This was the seventh appearance of the event, which is one of 12 athletics events to have been held at every Summer Olympics. The defending gold medalist from 1920, Bevil Rudd of South Africa, did not return; the other two medalists, silver-winning Guy Butler of Great Britain and bronze-winning Nils Engdahl of Sweden, did. Eric Liddell of Great Britain was the 1924 Scottish and AAA champion.

Argentina, Australia, Brazil, Bulgaria, Haiti, Ireland, Mexico, Poland, and Switzerland appeared in the event for the first time. The United States made its seventh appearance in the event, the only nation to compete in it at every Olympic Games to that point.

== Competition format ==
The competition retained the basic four-round format from 1920. The first round had 17 heats, ranging from 1 to 5 athletes. The top two runners in each heat advanced to the quarterfinals. There were 6 quarterfinals, intended to have 5 or 6 runners in each but sometimes having 4 due to withdrawals; the top two athletes in each quarterfinal heat advanced to the semifinals. The semifinals featured 2 heats of 6 runners each. The top three runners in each semifinal heat advanced, making a six-man final.

== Records ==
These were the standing world and Olympic records (in seconds) prior to the 1924 Summer Olympics.

World record	Ted Meredith (USA)	47.4(*)	Cambridge, United States	27 May 1916
Olympic record	Charles Reidpath (USA)	48.2	Stockholm, Sweden	13 July 1912

(*) 440 yards (= 402.34 m)

In the quarterfinals, Josef Imbach set a new Olympic record with 48.0 seconds. In the semifinals Horatio Fitch improved the Olympic record with 47.8 seconds. In the final, Eric Liddell set a new world record with 47.6 seconds; this time was ratified as a 400 metres world record as Ted Meredith ran his record over 440 yards. World Athletics rescinded Liddell's time as a world record in 1928.

== Schedule ==
Date	Time	Round
Thursday, 10 July 1924	14:00; 16:00	Heats; Quarterfinals
Friday, 11 July 1924	14:45; 17:30	Semifinals; Final

== Results ==
=== Round 1 ===
All heats were held on Thursday, July 10, 1924, and started at 2 p.m.

The best two finishers of every heat qualified for the quarter-finals.

==== Heat 1 ====
Rank	Athlete	Nation	Time	Notes
1	Horace Aylwin	Canada	54.0	Q
2	Erik Wilén	Finland	54.8	Q

==== Heat 2 ====
Rank	Athlete	Nation	Time	Notes
1	Ray Robertson	United States	50.2	Q
2	Kai Jensen	Denmark	50.9	Q
3	Jules Migeot	Belgium	51.6	
4	Reinhold Kesküll	Estonia	53.2	
5	Christophe Mirgain	Luxembourg	Unknown	

==== Heat 3 ====
Rank	Athlete	Nation	Time	Notes
1	Gustaf Wejnarth	Sweden	50.2	Q
2	Lajos Kurunczy	Hungary	52.6	Q
3	Richard Honner	Australia	53.1	
4	Kiril Petrunov	Bulgaria	Unknown	

==== Heat 4 ====
Rank	Athlete	Nation	Time	Notes
1	Eric Wilson	United States	49.6	Q
2	Roy Norman	Australia	50.6	Q
3	William Fuller	Canada	51.5	
4	Édouard Armand	Haiti	Unknown	

==== Heat 5 ====
Rank	Athlete	Nation	Time	Notes
1	Josef Imbach	Switzerland	51.8	Q

==== Heat 6 ====
Rank	Athlete	Nation	Time	Notes
1	David Johnson	Canada	51.8	Q
2	Charles Hoff	Norway	53.0	Q

==== Heat 7 ====
Rank	Athlete	Nation	Time	Notes
1	John Coard Taylor	United States	50.8	Q
2	Tokushige Noto	Japan	51.7	Q
3	Wim Bolten	Netherlands	53.0	

==== Heat 8 ====
Rank	Athlete	Nation	Time	Notes
1	Toby Betts	South Africa	49.8	Q
2	Sean Lavan	Ireland	51.2	Q
3	Wim Kat	Netherlands	51.8	
4	Guillermo Amparan	Mexico	52.0	

==== Heat 9 ====
Rank	Athlete	Nation	Time	Notes
1	Artur Svensson	Sweden	50.0	Q
2	Raymond Fritz	France	51.0	Q
3	Charles Lane	Australia	51.4	
4	Menso Menso	Netherlands	Unknown	
5	Juan Escutia	Mexico	Unknown	

==== Heat 10 ====
Rank	Athlete	Nation	Time	Notes
1	Clarence Oldfield	South Africa	49.6	Q
2	Edward Toms	Great Britain	49.9	Q
3	Carlos Garces	Mexico	51.0	
4	Emilio Casanovas	Argentina	Unknown	

==== Heat 11 ====
Rank	Athlete	Nation	Time	Notes
1	Nils Engdahl	Sweden	49.2	Q
2	George Renwick	Great Britain	50.3	Q
3	Francisco Dova	Argentina	51.0	
4	José Martínez	Mexico	Unknown	

==== Heat 12 ====
Rank	Athlete	Nation	Time	Notes
1	Terence Pitt	India	49.8	Q
2	Alan Christie	Canada	50.5	Q
3	Félix Escobar	Argentina	51.4	
4	Raymond Jamois	France	Unknown	
5	Karel Přibyl	Czechoslovakia	52.8	

==== Heat 13 ====
Rank	Athlete	Nation	Time	Notes
1	Luigi Facelli	Italy	51.0	Q
2	Federico Brewster	Argentina	51.8	Q
3	Stefan Ołdak	Poland	55.0	

==== Heat 14 ====
Rank	Athlete	Nation	Time	Notes
1	Eric Liddell	Great Britain	50.2	Q
2	Alfredo Gargiullo	Italy	50.4	Q
3	Erik Byléhn	Sweden	50.6	
4	Stanisław Świętochowski	Poland	55.4	

==== Heat 15 ====
Rank	Athlete	Nation	Time	Notes
1	Horatio Fitch	United States	52.0	Q
2	Erik Åström	Finland	52.1	Q

==== Heat 16 ====
Rank	Athlete	Nation	Time	Notes
1	Guy Butler	Great Britain	50.2	Q
2	Gaston Féry	France	51.1	Q
3	Narciso Costa	Brazil	Unknown	
4	Ennio Maffiolini	Italy	Unknown	
5	Christian Simmen	Switzerland	Unknown	

==== Heat 17 ====
Rank	Athlete	Nation	Time	Notes
1	Barthélémy Favodon	France	51.2	Q
2	Adriaan Paulen	Netherlands	52.0	Q
3	Paul Hammer	Luxembourg	53.1	

=== Quarterfinals ===
All quarter-finals were held on Thursday, July 10, 1924, and started at 4 p.m.

The best two finishers of every heat qualified for the semifinals.

Lajos Kurunczy and Erik Åström had qualified for the quarterfinals but withdrew.

==== Quarterfinal 1 ====
Rank	Athlete	Nation	Time	Notes
1	Horatio Fitch	United States	49.0	Q
2	Artur Svensson	Sweden	50.0	Q
3	Alan Christie	Canada	50.8	
4	Edward Toms	Great Britain	Unknown	

==== Quarterfinal 2 ====
Rank	Athlete	Nation	Time	Notes
1	Toby Betts	South Africa	49.0	Q
2	Charles Hoff	Norway	49.2	Q
3	Gustaf Wejnarth	Sweden	50.2	
4	Gaston Féry	France	50.7	

==== Quarterfinal 3 ====
Rank	Athlete	Nation	Time	Notes
1	Guy Butler	Great Britain	49.8	Q
2	John Coard Taylor	United States	50.4	Q
3	Barthélémy Favodon	France	50.9	
4	Terence Pitt	India	51.6	
5	Kai Jensen	Denmark	Unknown	
6	Federico Brewster	Argentina	Unknown	

==== Quarterfinal 4 ====
Rank	Athlete	Nation	Time	Notes
1	Adriaan Paulen	Netherlands	49.0	Q
2	Eric Liddell	Great Britain	49.3	Q
3	Ray Robertson	United States	49.5	
4	Luigi Facelli	Italy	50.5	
5	Raymond Fritz	France	50.5	

==== Quarterfinal 5 ====
Rank	Athlete	Nation	Time	Notes
1	Clarence Oldfield	South Africa	49.0	Q
2	David Johnson	Canada	49.3	Q
3	Erik Wilén	Finland	49.6	
4	Roy Norman	Australia	50.2	
5	Alfredo Gargiullo	Italy	Unknown	
6	George Renwick	Great Britain	Unknown	

==== Quarterfinal 6 ====
Rank	Athlete	Nation	Time	Notes
1	Josef Imbach	Switzerland	48.0	Q, OR
2	Nils Engdahl	Sweden	48.4	Q
3	Eric Wilson	United States	48.8	
4	Sean Lavan	Ireland	49.8	
5	Tokushige Noto	Japan	50.7	
6	Horace Aylwin	Canada	Unknown	

=== Semifinals ===
All semi-finals were held on Friday, July 11, 1924, and started at 2:45 p.m.

The best three finishers of each heat qualified for the final.

==== Semifinal 1 ====
Rank	Athlete	Nation	Time	Notes
1	Horatio Fitch	United States	47.8	Q, OR
2	Guy Butler	Great Britain	47.9	Q
3	David Johnson	Canada	48.0	Q
4	Adriaan Paulen	Netherlands	48.2	
5	Toby Betts	South Africa	48.4	
6	Nils Engdahl	Sweden	48.6	

==== Semifinal 2 ====
Rank	Athlete	Nation	Time	Notes
1	Eric Liddell	Great Britain	48.2	Q
2	Josef Imbach	Switzerland	48.3	Q
3	John Coard Taylor	United States	48.7	Q
4	Charles Hoff	Norway	48.8	
5	Clarence Oldfield	South Africa	49.0	
6	Artur Svensson	Sweden	49.1	

=== Final ===
The final was held on Friday, July 11, 1924, and started at 5:30 p.m. Taylor's ankle gave out just before the finish line in a career-ending injury; he crawled across the line. Imbach tripped over the lane-dividing ropes, fell, and was unable to finish.

Rank	Athlete	Nation	Time	Notes
1st place, gold medalist(s)	Eric Liddell	Great Britain	47.6	OR
2nd place, silver medalist(s)	Horatio Fitch	United States	48.4	
3rd place, bronze medalist(s)	Guy Butler	Great Britain	48.6	
4	David Johnson	Canada	48.8	
5	John Coard Taylor	United States	1:07.0	
—	Josef Imbach	Switzerland	DNF	
