= Athletics at the 1924 Summer Olympics – Men's 4 × 400 metres relay =

Men's 4 × 400 metres relay at the Games of the VIII Olympiad
- Venue: Stade Olympique Yves-du-Manoir
- Dates: July 12, 1924 (semifinals); July 13, 1924 (final)
- Competitors: 28 from 7 nations

Medalists
| 1st place, gold medalist(s) | | Cochran, Helffrich, MacDonald, Stevenson; United States |
| 2nd place, silver medalist(s) | | Byléhn, Engdahl, Svensson, Wejnarth; Sweden |
| 3rd place, bronze medalist(s) | | Butler, Renwick, Ripley, Toms; Great Britain |

The men's 4 × 400 metres relay event was part of the track and field athletics programme at the 1924 Summer Olympics. It was the third appearance of this event. The competition was held on Saturday, July 12, 1924, and on Sunday, July 13, 1924.

As for all other events the track was 500 metres in circumference. Twenty-eight runners from seven nations competed.

== Records ==
These were the standing world and Olympic records (in minutes) prior to the 1924 Summer Olympics.

| World record | 3:16.6 | (United States) Mel Sheppard (United States) Edward Lindberg (United States) Ted Meredith (United States) Charles Reidpath | Stockholm (SWE) | July 15, 1912 |
| Olympic record | 3:16.6 | (United States) Mel Sheppard (United States) Edward Lindberg (United States) Ted Meredith (United States) Charles Reidpath | Stockholm (SWE) | July 15, 1912 |

In the final, the United States team set a new world record with 3:16.0.

== Results ==
=== Round 1 ===
The heats were held on Saturday, July 12, 1924, and started at 4 p.m. The top two in each heat qualified for the semi-finals which means that only one team (Finland) was eliminated.

Heat 1

| Place | Athletes | Time | Qual. |
|---|---|---|---|
| 1 | Raymond Fritz, Gaston Féry, Francis Galtier, Barthélémy Favodon (FRA) | 3:30.0 | Q |
| 2 | Artur Svensson, Erik Byléhn, Gustaf Wejnarth, Nils Engdahl (SWE) | 3:37.5 | Q |

Heat 2

| Place | Athletes | Time | Qual. |
|---|---|---|---|
| 1 | Edward Toms, George Renwick, Richard Ripley, Guy Butler (GBR) | 3:22.0 | Q |
| 2 | Guido Cominotto, Luigi Facelli, Alfredo Gargiullo, Ennio Maffiolini (ITA) | 3:30.0 | Q |
| 3 | Erik Åström, Hirsch Drisin, Eero Lehtonen, Erik Wilén (FIN) | 3:32.2 | |

Heat 3

| Place | Athletes | Time | Qual. |
|---|---|---|---|
| 1 | Commodore Cochran, William Stevenson, Oliver MacDonald, Alan Helffrich (USA) | 3:27.0 | Q |
| 2 | Horace Aylwin, Alan Christie, David Johnson, William Maynes (CAN) | 3:34.5 | Q |

=== Final ===
The final was held on Sunday, July 13, 1924, and was started at 5:15 p.m.

| Place | Athletes | Time |
|---|---|---|
| 1 | Commodore Cochran, William Stevenson, Oliver MacDonald, Alan Helffrich (USA) | 3:16.0 WR |
| 2 | Artur Svensson, Erik Byléhn, Gustaf Wejnarth, Nils Engdahl (SWE) | 3:17.0 |
| 3 | Edward Toms, George Renwick, Richard Ripley, Guy Butler (GBR) | 3:17.4 |
| 4 | Horace Aylwin, Alan Christie, David Johnson, William Maynes (CAN) | 3:22.8 |
| 5 | Raymond Fritz, Gaston Féry, Francis Galtier, Barthélémy Favodon (FRA) | 3:23.4 |
| — | Guido Cominotto, Luigi Facelli, Alfredo Gargiullo, Ennio Maffiolini (ITA) | 3:28.0 |

The winning USA relay team.
