= Athletics at the 1924 Summer Olympics =

Athletics at the Games of the VIII Olympiad
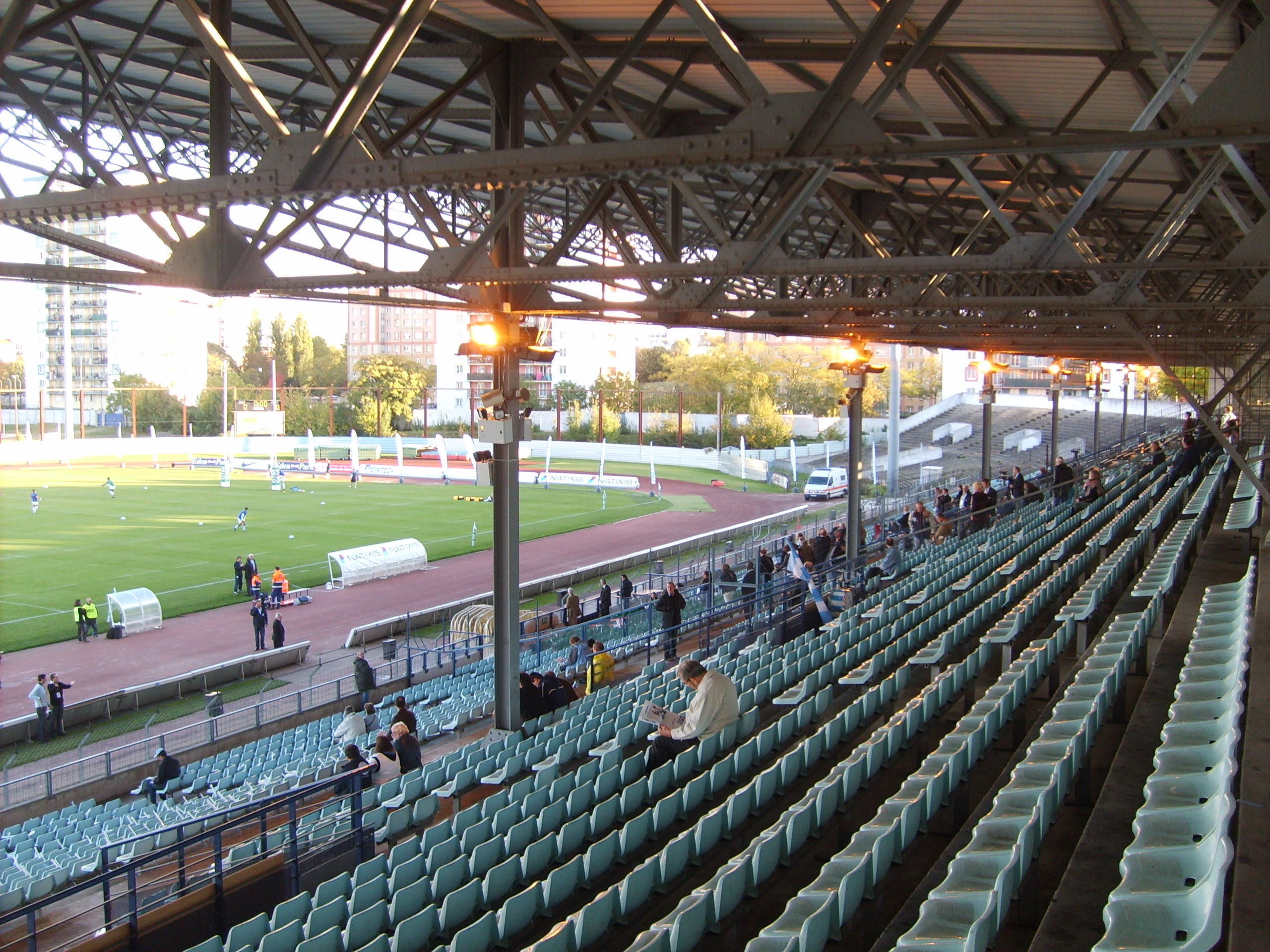
- Host stadium (shown in 2009)
- Venue: Stade Yves-du-Manoir
- Dates: 6-13 July
- No. of events: 27
- Competitors: 386 from 34 nations

At the 1924 Summer Olympics held in Paris, 27 athletics events were contested, all for men only. The competitions were held from 6 to 13 July.

There were no events in athletics for women at this edition of the Olympic Games.

== Medal summary ==
Event	Gold		Silver		Bronze	
100 metres	Harold Abrahams; Great Britain	10.6	Jackson Scholz; United States	10.7	Arthur Porritt; New Zealand	10.8
200 metres	Jackson Scholz; United States	21.6	Charles Paddock; United States	21.7	Eric Liddell; Great Britain	21.9
400 metres	Eric Liddell; Great Britain	47.6	Horatio Fitch; United States	48.4	Guy Butler; Great Britain	48.6
800 metres	Douglas Lowe; Great Britain	1:52.4	Paul Martin; Switzerland	1:52.6	Schuyler Enck; United States	1:53.0
1500 metres	Paavo Nurmi; Finland	3:53.6	Willy Schärer; Switzerland	3:55.0	H. B. Stallard; Great Britain	3:55.6
5000 metres	Paavo Nurmi; Finland	14:31.2	Ville Ritola; Finland	14:31.4	Edvin Wide; Sweden	15:01.8
10,000 metres	Ville Ritola; Finland	30:23.2	Edvin Wide; Sweden	30:55.2	Eero Berg; Finland	31:43.0
110 metres hurdles	Daniel Kinsey; United States	15.0	Sid Atkinson; South Africa	15.0	Sten Pettersson; Sweden	15.4
400 metres hurdles	Morgan Taylor; United States	52.6	Erik Vilen; Finland	53.8	Ivan Riley; United States	54.2
3000 metres steeplechase	Ville Ritola; Finland	9:33.6	Elias Katz; Finland	9:44.0	Paul Bontemps; France	9:45.2
4 × 100 metres relay	United States; Loren Murchison; Louis Clarke; Frank Hussey; Alfred LeConey	41.0	Great Britain; Harold Abrahams; Walter Rangeley; Wilfred Nichol; Lancelot Royle	41.2	Netherlands; Jan de Vries; Jacob Boot; Harry Broos; Marinus van den Berge	41.8
4 × 400 metres relay	United States; Commodore Cochran; Alan Helffrich; Oliver MacDonald; William Stevenson	3:16.0	Sweden; Artur Svensson; Erik Byléhn; Gustaf Wejnarth; Nils Engdahl	3:17.0	Great Britain; Edward Toms; George Renwick; Richard Ripley; Guy Butler	3:17.4
3000 metres team race	Finland; Paavo Nurmi; Ville Ritola; Elias Katz	8 pts	Great Britain; Bertram Macdonald; Herbert Johnston; George Webber	14 pts	United States; Edward Kirby; William Cox; Willard Tibbetts	25 pts
Marathon	Albin Stenroos; Finland	2:41:22.6	Romeo Bertini; Italy	2:47:19.6	Clarence DeMar; United States	2:48:14.0
10 kilometres walk	Ugo Frigerio; Italy	47:49.0	Gordon Goodwin; Great Britain	48:37.9	Cecil McMaster; South Africa	49:08.0
Individual cross country	Paavo Nurmi; Finland	32:54.8	Ville Ritola; Finland	34:19.4	Earl Johnson; United States	35:21.0
Team cross country	Finland; Paavo Nurmi; Ville Ritola; Heikki Liimatainen	11 pts	United States; Earl Johnson; Arthur Studenroth; August Fager	14 pts	France; Henri Lauvaux; Gaston Heuet; Maurice Norland	20 pts
High jump	Harold Osborn; United States	1.98 m	Leroy Brown; United States	1.95 m	Pierre Lewden; France	1.92 m
Pole vault	Lee Barnes; United States	3.95 m	Glenn Graham; United States	3.95 m	James Brooker; United States	3.90 m
Long jump	DeHart Hubbard; United States	7.445 m	Edward Gourdin; United States	7.275 m	Sverre Hansen; Norway	7.260 m
Triple jump	Nick Winter; Australia	15.525 m	Luis Brunetto; Argentina	15.425 m	Vilho Tuulos; Finland	15.370 m
Shot put	Bud Houser; United States	14.995 m	Glenn Hartranft; United States	14.895 m	Ralph Hills; United States	14.640 m
Discus throw	Bud Houser; United States	46.155 m	Vilho Niittymaa; Finland	44.95 m	Thomas Lieb; United States	44.83 m
Hammer throw	Fred Tootell; United States	53.295 m	Matt McGrath; United States	50.840 m	Malcolm Nokes; Great Britain	48.875 m
Javelin throw	Jonni Myyrä; Finland	62.96 m	Gunnar Lindström; Sweden	60.92 m	Eugene Oberst; United States	58.35 m
Pentathlon	Eero Lehtonen; Finland	14 pts	Elemér Somfay; Hungary	16 pts	Robert LeGendre; United States	18 pts
Decathlon	Harold Osborn; United States	7710.775 pts	Emerson Norton; United States	7350.895 pts	Aleksander Klumberg; Estonia	7329.360 pts

== Medal table ==
Rank	Nation	Gold	Silver	Bronze	Total
1	United States	12	10	10	32
2	Finland	10	5	2	17
3	Great Britain	3	3	5	11
4	Italy	1	1	0	2
5	Australia	1	0	0	1
6	Sweden	0	3	2	5
7	Switzerland	0	2	0	2
8	South Africa	0	1	1	2
9	Argentina	0	1	0	1
9	Hungary	0	1	0	1
11	France	0	0	3	3
12	Estonia	0	0	1	1
12	Netherlands	0	0	1	1
12	New Zealand	0	0	1	1
12	Norway	0	0	1	1
Totals (15 entries)		27	27	27	81

== Participating nations ==
657 athletes from 40 nations competed. Ten nations competed in athletics for the first time. Cuba, Lithuania, Romania, Uruguay and Germany were the only five nations not to compete in athletics.

- Argentina (10)
- Australia (9)
- Austria (6)
- Belgium (17)
- Brazil (8)
- Bulgaria (4)
- Canada (27)
- Chile (3)
- Czechoslovakia (17)
- Denmark (9)
- Ecuador (3)
- Egypt (1)
- Estonia (11)
- Finland (52)

- France (70)
- Great Britain (65)
- Greece (12)
- Haiti (3)
- Hungary (16)
- India (7)
- Ireland (11)
- Italy (36)
- Japan (8)
- Latvia (10)
- Luxembourg (3)
- Mexico (11)
- Monaco (1)
- Netherlands (19)

- New Zealand (1)
- Norway (10)
- Philippines (1)
- Poland (14)
- Portugal (3)
- South Africa (12)
- Spain (13)
- Sweden (33)
- Switzerland (17)
- Turkey (4)
- United States (96)
- Yugoslavia (5)
