= Simen =

Simen is a male given name that is a Norwegian variant of Simon. It is also an Italian surname. Notable people with the name include:

- Simen Agdestein (born 1967), Norwegian chess grandmaster and retired footballer
- Simen Berntsen (born 1976), retired Norwegian ski jumper
- Simen Brekkhus (born 1997), Norwegian footballer
- Simen Brenne (born 1981), Norwegian footballer
- Simen Guttormsen (born 2001), Norwegian pole vaulter
- Simen Hestnæs or ICS Vortex (born 1974), Norwegian musician, vocalist of the avant-garde metal band Arcturus
- Simen Kvia-Egeskog (born 2003), Norwegian footballer
- Simen Lieungh (born 1960), Norwegian businessperson
- Simen Møller (born 1988), Norwegian footballer
- Simen Østensen (born 1984), Norwegian cross-country skier
- Simen Skappel (1866–1945), Norwegian historian and statistician
- Simen Skjønsberg (1920–1993), Norwegian journalist and writer
- Simen Wangberg (born 1991), Norwegian footballer
- Simen Hegstad Krüger (born 1993), Norwegian cross-country skier
- Simen Skagestad (born 2015), Norwegian

== Surname ==
- Enrico "Rico" Simen (born 1962), Swiss curler, 1988 Winter Olympics participant
- Rinaldo Simen (1849–1910), Swiss journalist and politician

== See also ==
- Simen Mountain National Park or Semien Mountains National Park, one of the National Parks of Ethiopia
- Simen Mountains or Semien Mountains (also spelled Simien and Simen) lie in northern Ethiopia, north east of Gondar
- Simen ta or Four Gates Pagoda, Sui dynasty (581–618 AD) stone Chinese pagoda in central Shandong Province, China
- Simon (given name)
- Saimin
- Semen
- Shimen (disambiguation)
- Simeon (disambiguation)
- Simmen
