= Erik Åström =

Finnish sprinter

Erik Johannes "Åsa" Åström (23 February 1902 – 25 April 1971) was a Finnish sprinter. He set Finnish records at 200 m and 400 m and competed in the 1924 Summer Olympics.

== Career ==
Åström first became Finnish champion at 200 m in 1921; his time 22.1 was better than the national record, but was not accepted due to a suspect start. At the 1924 Summer Olympics in Paris Åström represented Finland in both the 400 m individual race and the 4 × 400 m relay; he qualified from the heats in the individual race, but did not take part in the second round. During the mid-1920s he was Finland's best at both 200 m and 400 m; he won both events at the inaugural Finland-Sweden Athletics International, held in Helsinki in September 1925. At the longer distance he defeated Sweden's Olympic medalists Erik Byléhn and Nils Engdahl, and his time of 49.0 equalled Erik Wilén's Finnish record. The same year, he first equalled Lauri Härö's Finnish 200 m record of 22.2 and then improved it to 22.1 in Stockholm, this time legitimately. Åström won the 400 m again at the second Finland-Sweden meet in 1927.
