= John Coard Taylor =

American sprinter and hurdler (1901–1946)

John Coard Taylor (January 1, 1901 – June 25, 1946) was an American track and field athlete who placed fifth in the men's 400 meters at the 1924 Summer Olympics. He was national champion in the 220-yd low hurdles in 1922 and IC4A champion in 1922 and 1923.

== Biography ==
Taylor, descended from early Dutch settlers in New York City, was born in Cranford, New Jersey. He studied at Princeton University, which had a strong track and field team under coach Keene Fitzpatrick. In 1922, his junior year, Taylor won the 220-yard hurdles in 23.9 at the intercollegiate (IC4A) championships and in 24.6 at the AAU national championships; in the AAU meet he represented the New York Athletic Club. The following year he repeated as IC4A champion in the low hurdles (23.8) and placed a close second behind Allen Woodring in the 440 yards; his estimated time, 48.4y, ranked him third in the world that year.

Taylor won the 400 meters at the 1924 United States Olympic Trials in Cambridge, Massachusetts; he ran his lifetime best, 48.1, in the heats and repeated that time in the final, defeating the eventual Olympic silver medalist Horatio Fitch. (Note: Taylor's 48.1 was a world best for the metric distance, but inferior to Ted Meredith's 440-yard (402.3 m) time of 47 2/5 seconds. At the time, a better mark over a longer distance was not automatically a world record for the shorter event as well; this was changed in 1926.) At the Olympics in Paris Taylor qualified for the final; he remained in medal contention until his sore ankle gave way just before the finish. He eventually crawled across the finish line and placed fifth; the injury ended his athletic career.

In 1926 Taylor joined the Ethyl Gasoline Corporation; he was named the company's general sales manager in 1931 and vice president in charge of sales in 1937. Still working for Ethyl, Taylor died of a heart attack in New York City on June 25, 1946; he was survived by his wife and three sons.
