= Tokushige =

Tokushige (written: 徳重) is a Japanese surname. Notable people with the surname include:

- Kenta Tokushige (徳重 健太, born 1984), Japanese footballer
- Tokushige Noto (1902–1991), Japanese sprinter
- Takaaki Tokushige (徳重 隆明, born 1975), Japanese footballer

== See also ==
- Farrington v. Tokushige, United States Supreme Court case
- Tokushige Station (徳重駅), underground metro station in Midori-ku, Nagoya, Aichi Prefecture, Japan
