= Guido Cominotto =

Italian sprinter (1901–1967)

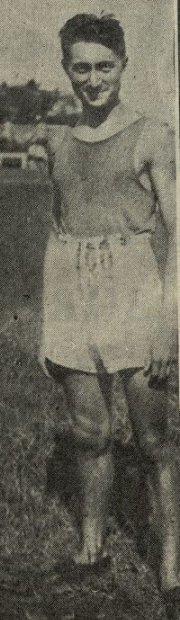
- Guido Cominotto

Personal information
- Nationality: Italian
- Born: 4 October 1901 Mestre, Italy
- Died: 9 March 1967 (aged 65)

Sport
- Country: Italy
- Sport: Athletics
- Events: 400 metres 800 metres
- Club: AA La Fenice Venezia; G.S. Nafta Genova

Achievements and titles
- Personal bests: 400 m: 51.0 (1922); 800 m: 1:55.6 (1926)

Guido Cominotto (Mestre, 4 October 1901 - 9 March 1967) was an Italian sprinter (400 m) and middle distance runner (800 m).

== Biography ==
Guido Cominotto participated at two editions of the Summer Olympics (1924, 1928), he had 7 caps in national team from 1924 to 1928.

== Achievements ==
Year	Competition	Venue	Position	Event	Performance	Note
1924	Olympic Games	(France) Paris	6th	4 × 400 m relay	3:28.0	
1928	Olympic Games	(Netherlands) Amsterdam	SF	800 metres	NT	
1928	Olympic Games	(Netherlands) Amsterdam	Heat	4 × 400 m relay	3:22.6	

== National titles ==
Guido Cominotto has won 6 times the individual national championship.

- 2 wins on 400 metres (1922, 1923)
- 4 wins on 800 metres (1922, 1923, 1924, 1926)

== See also ==
- Italy national relay team
