= William Stevenson (athlete) =

American athlete

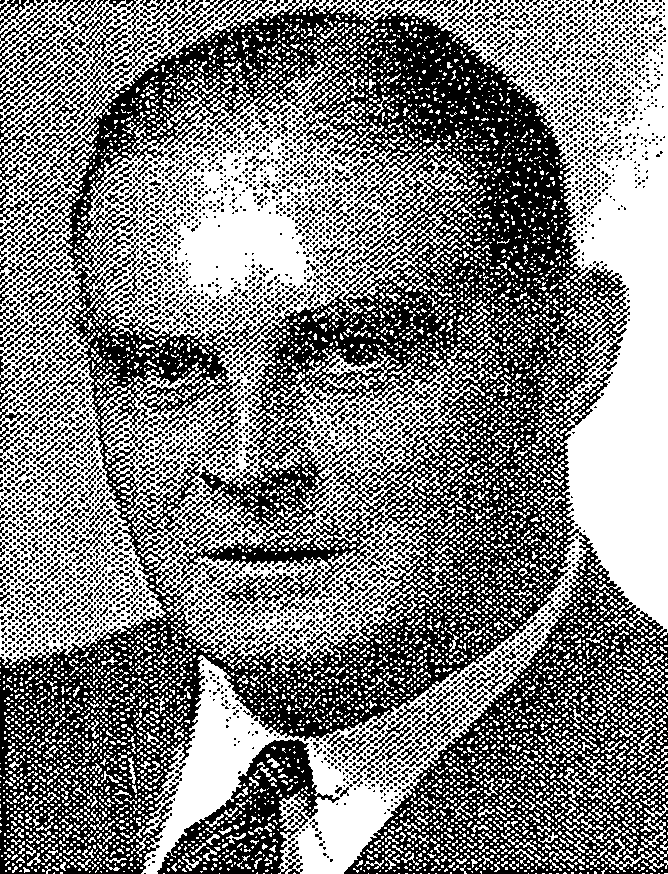
- Stevenson in 1961

United States Ambassador to the Philippines
- In office February 5, 1962 – June 14, 1964
- President: John F. Kennedy; Lyndon B. Johnson
- Preceded by: John D. Hickerson
- Succeeded by: William McCormick Blair, Jr.

8th President of Oberlin College
- In office 1946 – 1960
- Preceded by: Ernest Hatch Wilkins
- Succeeded by: Robert K. Carr

Personal details
- Born: William Edwards Stevenson; October 25, 1900 Chicago, Illinois, U.S.
- Died: April 2, 1985 (aged 84) Fort Myers, Florida, U.S.
- Spouse: Eleanor "Bumpie" Bumstead Stevenson (m. 1926)
- Children: 2, including Helen
- Education: Princeton University; University of Oxford
- Profession: Track and field athlete, lawyer, diplomat
- Sports career
- Height: 183 cm (6 ft 0 in)
- Weight: 77 kg (170 lb)
- Sport: Athletics
- Event: 400 m/440 y
- Club: University of Oxford AC; Achilles Club
Medal record
Athletics
Representing United States
Olympic Games
| Gold medal – first place | 1924 Paris | 4 × 400 m relay |

William Edwards Stevenson (October 25, 1900 – April 2, 1985) was an American track and field athlete, lawyer and diplomat, who won the gold medal in the 4 × 400 metres relay at the 1924 Summer Olympics, and later served as the president of Oberlin College.

== Biography ==
=== Early life and education ===
Born in Chicago, Illinois, was a graduate of Andover and Princeton University before winning a Rhodes Scholarship to Oxford University, where he studied law.

=== Legal career ===
After returning to the United States, he was an assistant U.S. attorney for the southern district of New York in the 1920s and, in 1931, founded the prominent New York law partnership of Debevoise, Stevenson, Plimpton and Page, now Debevoise & Plimpton L.L.P.

=== Athletics and 1924 Summer Olympics ===
William Stevenson won the AAU championships in 440 yd (400 m) in 1921.

Stevenson won the British AAA Championships title in the 440 yards event at the 1923 AAA Championships.

The following year in Paris at the 1924 Olympic Games, Stevenson ran the second leg on the American 4 × 400 meters relay team, which won the gold medal with a new world record of 3.16.0. His teammates were Commodore Cochran, Oliver MacDonald and Alan Helffrich.

=== World War II ===
During the World War II, Stevenson and his wife, Eleanor "Bumpie" Bumstead Stevenson, a 1923 graduate of Smith College, organized and administered American Red Cross operations in Great Britain, North Africa, Sicily, and Italy. Both he and his wife were awarded the Bronze Star for meritorious achievement in support of military operations. (Eleanor Stevenson was the author of I Knew Your Soldier in 1946. She was active in the civil rights movement and the first person to give a nationally broadcast speech on behalf of Planned Parenthood.)

=== President of Oberlin College ===
In 1946, Stevenson succeeded Ernest Hatch Wilkins as president of Oberlin College. He held the post until 1960.

=== Ambassador ===
In 1962 John F. Kennedy appointed him as an ambassador to Philippines, where he served until 1965. He then became the head of the Aspen Institute of Humanistic Studies in Colorado.

=== Death ===
Stevenson died in Fort Myers, Florida, aged 84.

== Personal life ==
In 1937, Stevenson bought Buttonwood Manor in the North Stamford section of Stamford, Connecticut, an 1809 Colonial-style house. When Stevenson and his wife went to England during World War II, they rented the house to Dorothy Fields, a renowned lyricist, according to the columnist and war correspondent Ernie Pyle.

Stevenson was the father of U.S. Representative Helen Stevenson Meyner, who served for two terms, from 1975 to 1979. She was the wife of two-term New Jersey Gov. Robert B. Meyner. His other daughter, Priscilla, married Richard Hunt, a Harvard professor and the university's marshal. Stevenson also was a cousin of Vice-President Adlai E. Stevenson, presidential candidate Adlai Stevenson, Senator Adlai Stevenson III, and actor McLean Stevenson.

== See also ==
- List of Princeton University Olympians

Diplomatic posts
| Preceded by John D. Hickerson | United States Ambassador to the Philippines; 1962–1964 | Succeeded by William McCormick Blair, Jr. |
