= Simmen =

Simmen is a surname. Notable people with the surname include:

- Christian Simmen (1899–?), Swiss sprinter
- Gian Simmen (born 1977), Swiss snowboarder
- Matthias Simmen (born 1972), Swiss biathlete
- Rosemarie Simmen (1938–2024), Swiss pharmacist and politician
- Thomas Simmen (born 1969), Swiss Professor

== See also ==
- Simen
