= Wim Kat =

Dutch sprinter

Personal information
- Nationality: Dutch
- Born: 24 October 1904 Amsterdam, Netherlands
- Died: 23 June 1990 (aged 85) Groningen, Netherlands

Sport
- Sport: Sprinting
- Event: 400 metres

Wim Kat (24 October 1904 – 23 June 1990) was a Dutch sprinter. He competed in the men's 400 metres at the 1924 Summer Olympics.
