= Ray Robertson (athlete) =

American sprinter

Personal information
- Nationality: American
- Born: December 7, 1901 Dorchester, Massachusetts, United States
- Died: June 18, 1937 (aged 35) Boston, Massachusetts, United States

Sport
- Sport: Sprinting
- Event: 400 metres

Ray Robertson (December 7, 1901 – June 18, 1937) was an American sprinter. He competed in the men's 400 metres at the 1924 Summer Olympics.
