= Terence Pitt =

Indian sprinter

Personal information
- Full name: Terence Keith Pitt
- Nationality: Indian
- Born: 30 November 1903 Kidderpore, India
- Died: 1957 (aged 53–54) Thurrock, England

Sport
- Sport: Track and field
- Events: 100m, 200m, 400m

Terence Pitt (30 November 1903 – 1957) was an Indian sprinter. He competed in the men's 100 metres, 200 metres and the 400 metres events at the 1924 Summer Olympics.
