= Alfredo Gargiullo =

Italian sprinter

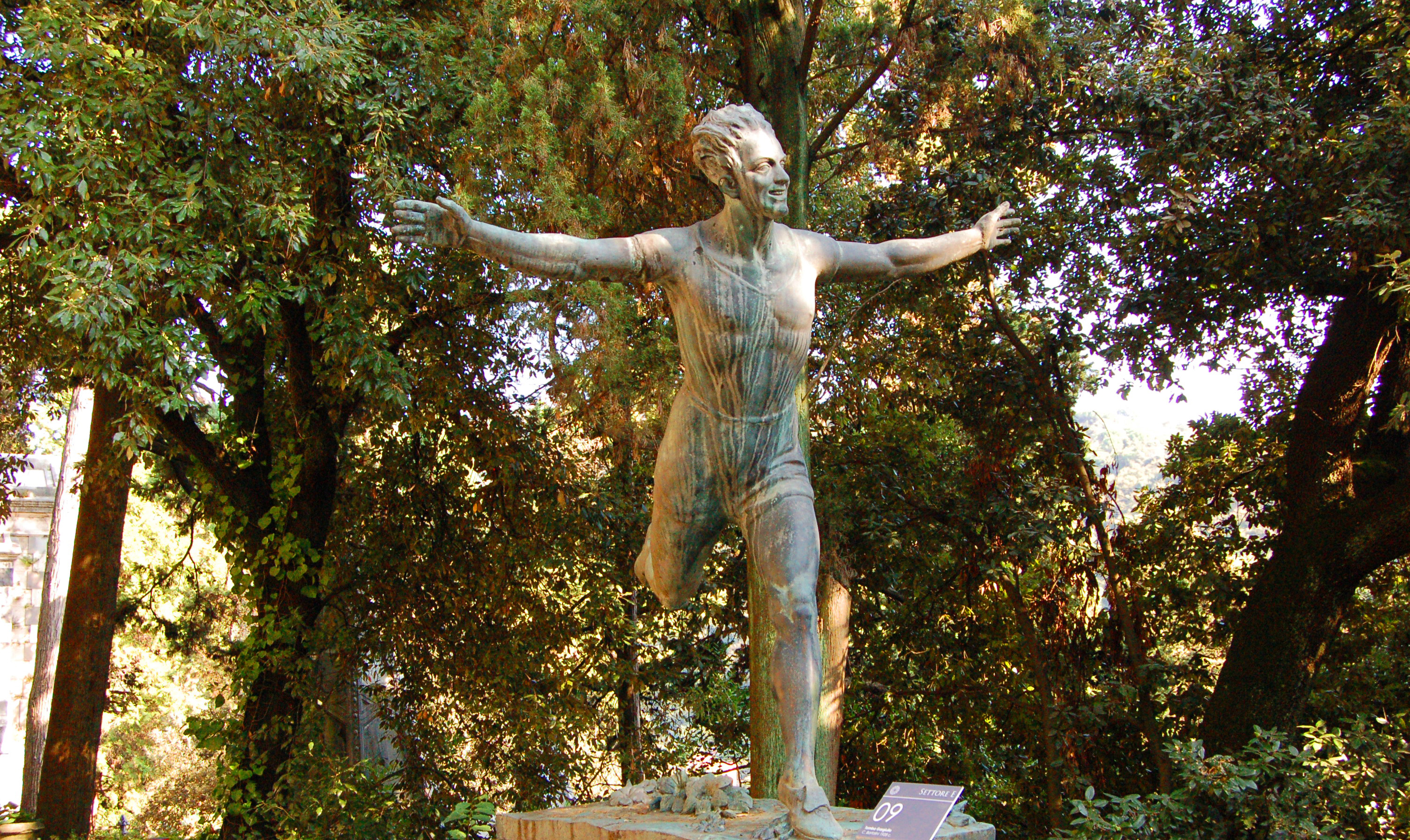
- Gargiullo's gravesite in Monumental Cemetery of Staglieno

Personal information
- Nationality: Italian
- Born: 3 April 1906 Genoa, Italy
- Died: 9 March 1928 (aged 21) Milan, Italy

Sport
- Country: Italy
- Sport: Athletics
- Event: 400 metres
- Club: Trionfo Ligure

Achievements and titles
- Personal best: 400 m: 49.0 (1927)

Alfredo Gargiullo (3 April 1906 – 9 March 1928) was an Italian sprinter (400 metres).

== Biography ==
Born in Genoa, Gargiullo participated at the 1924 Summer Olympics.

Gargiullo finished second behind Douglas Lowe in the 440 yards event at the 1927 AAA Championships.

He died young at the age of 21 in Milan.

== Olympic results ==
Year	Competition	Venue	Position	Event	Performance	Note
1924	Olympic Games	(France) Paris	QF	800 metres	NT	
1924	Olympic Games	(France) Paris	6th	4 × 400 m relay	3:28.0	

== National titles ==
Alfredo Gargiullo has won 2 times the individual national championship.

- 2 wins on 400 metres (1924, 1927)

== See also ==
- Italy national relay team
