= Francis Galtier =

French sprinter

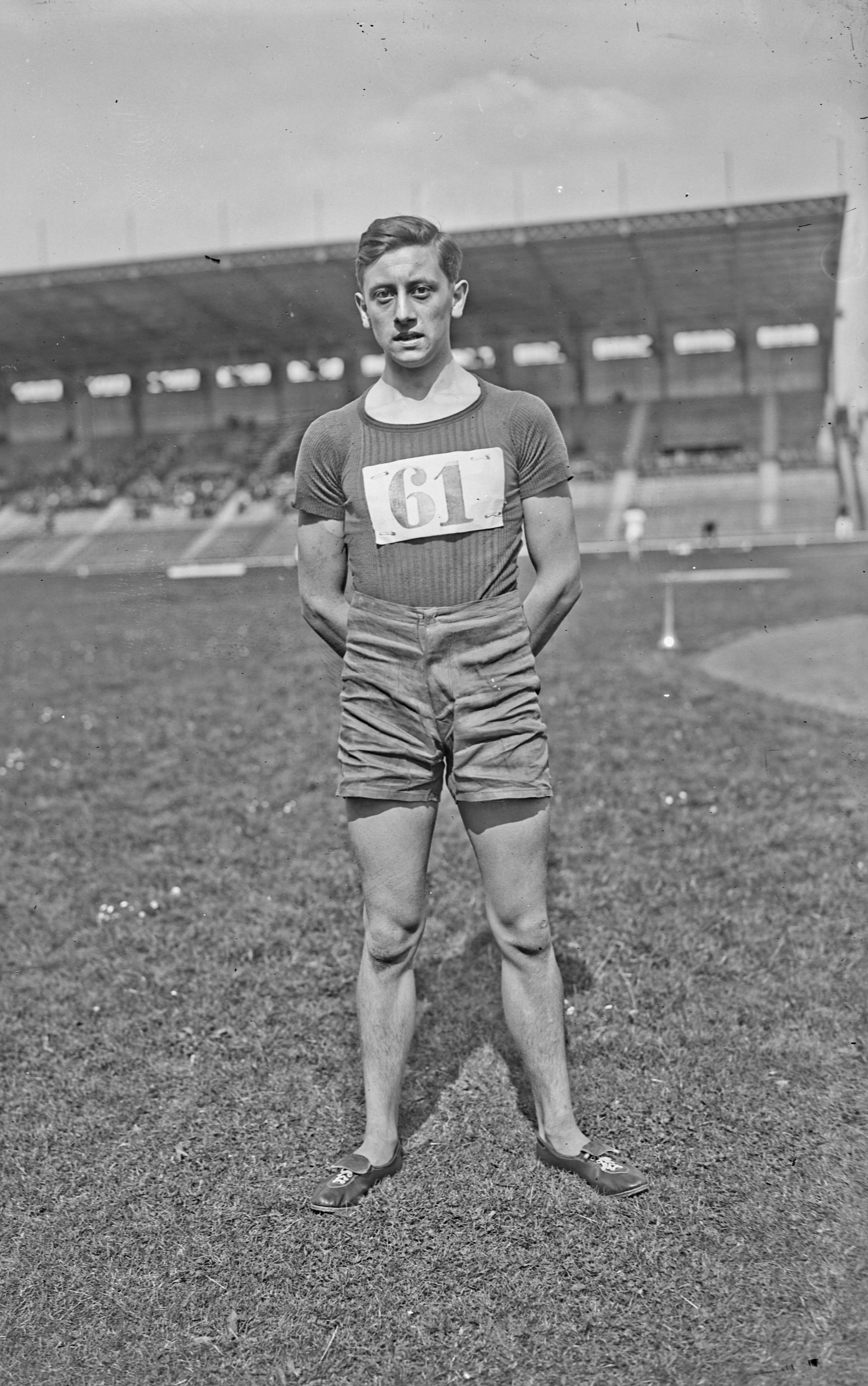

Personal information
- Nationality: French
- Born: 11 May 1907

Sport
- Sport: Sprinting
- Event: 4 × 400 metres relay

Francis Galtier (11 May 1907 – 15 June 1986) was a French sprinter. He competed in the men's 4 × 400 metres relay at the 1924 Summer Olympics.
