= Ennio Maffiolini =

Italian sprinter

Personal information
- Nationality: Italian
- Born: 1902 Italy

Sport
- Country: Italy
- Sport: Athletics
- Event: 400 metres
- Club: SG Gallaratese

Achievements and titles
- Personal best: 400 m: 51.2 (1924)

Ennio Maffiolini (1902 - date of death unknown) was an Italian sprinter (400 m).

== Biography ==
Ennio Maffiolini participated at one edition of the Summer Olympics (1924).

== Olympic results ==
| Year | Competition | Venue | Position | Event | Performance | Note |
|---|---|---|---|---|---|---|
| 1924 | Olympic Games | (France) Paris | Heat | 800 metres | NT | |
| 1924 | Olympic Games | (France) Paris | 6th | 4 × 400 m relay | 3:28.0 | |

== National championships ==
Ennio Maffiolini has won 2 times the national championship.

- 2 wins on 4 × 400 metres relay (1921, 1924)

== See also ==
- Italy national relay team
