= William Maynes =

Canadian sprinter (1902–1966)

Billy Maynes
Personal information
- Full name: William John Maynes
- Born: 26 September 1902 Saint John, New Brunswick, Canada
- Died: 4 August 1966 (aged 63)

Sport
- Sport: Sprinting
- Event: 4 × 400 metres relay

William John Maynes (26 September 1902 – 4 August 1966) was a Canadian sprinter. He competed in the men's 4 × 400 metres relay at the 1924 Summer Olympics.
