= Wim Bolten =

Dutch sprinter

Personal information
- Nationality: Dutch
- Born: 23 April 1901 Amsterdam, Netherlands
- Died: 19 December 1971 (aged 70)

Sport
- Sport: Sprinting
- Event: 400 metres

Wim Bolten (23 April 1901 – 19 December 1971) was a Dutch sprinter. He competed in the men's 400 metres at the 1924 Summer Olympics. He was the brother of swimmer Ada Bolten.
