= Menso Menso =

Dutch sprinter

Personal information
- Nationality: Dutch
- Born: 14 April 1903
- Died: 26 April 1990 (aged 87)

Sport
- Sport: Sprinting
- Event: 400 metres

Menso Menso (14 April 1903 – 26 April 1990) was a Dutch sprinter. He competed in the men's 400 metres at the 1924 Summer Olympics.
