= Hirsch Drisin =

Finnish sprinter (1902–1972)

Personal information
- Nationality: Finnish
- Born: 20 September 1902
- Died: 14 October 1972 (aged 70)

Sport
- Sport: Sprinting
- Event: 4 × 400 metres relay

Hirsch Drisin (20 September 1902 – 14 October 1972) was a Finnish sprinter. He competed in the men's 4 × 400 metres relay at the 1924 Summer Olympics. Drisin was Jewish, and he represented the Finnish Jewish sports club Makkabi Helsinki.
