= William Fuller (athlete) =

Canadian sprinter

Personal information
- Born: 3 July 1905 Montreal, Quebec, Canada
- Died: 16 October 1967 (aged 62) Copper Cliff, Ontario, Canada

Sport
- Sport: Sprinting
- Event: 400 metres

John William Fuller (3 July 1905 – 16 October 1967) was a Canadian sprinter. He competed in the men's 400 metres at the 1924 Summer Olympics.
