= Charles Lane (athlete) =

Australian sprinter (1905–1954)

Personal information
- Nationality: Australian
- Born: 19 March 1905
- Died: 14 December 1954 (aged 49)

Sport
- Sport: Sprinting
- Event: 400 metres

Charles Lane (19 March 1905 – 14 December 1954) was an Australian sprinter. He competed in the men's 400 metres at the 1924 Summer Olympics.
