= Raymond Jamois =

French sprinter

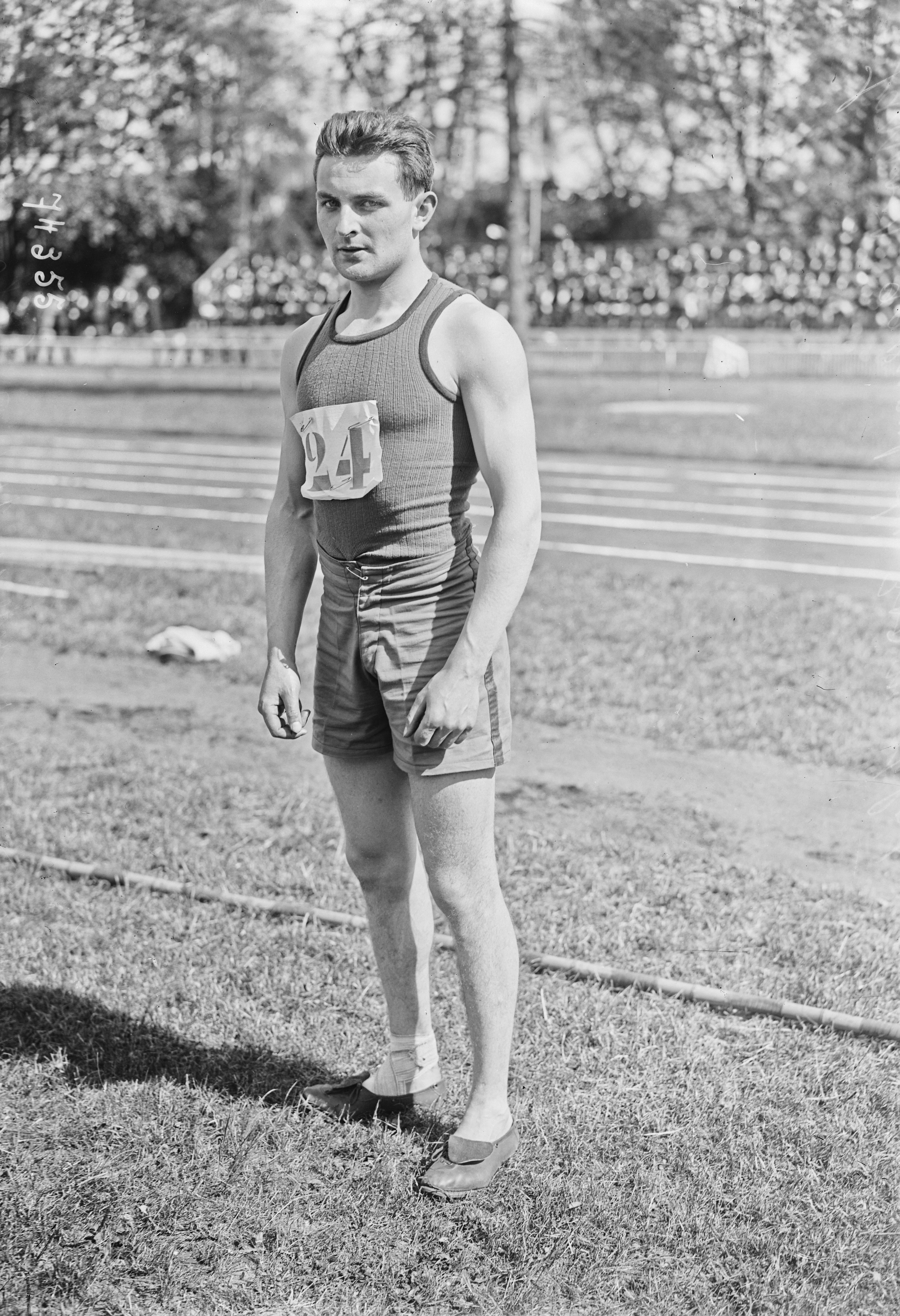

Personal information
- Nationality: French
- Born: 13 June 1901
- Died: 22 March 1983 (aged 81)

Sport
- Sport: Sprinting
- Event: 400 metres

Raymond Jamois (13 June 1901 – 22 March 1983) was a French sprinter. He competed in the men's 400 metres at the 1924 Summer Olympics.
