= Stefan Ołdak =

Polish sprinter (1904–1969)

Personal information
- Nationality: Polish
- Born: 5 November 1904 Warsaw, Russian Empire
- Died: 20 October 1969 (aged 64) Warsaw, Poland

Sport
- Sport: Sprinting
- Event: 400 metres

Stefan Ołdak (5 November 1904 – 20 October 1969) was a Polish sprinter. He competed in the men's 400 metres at the 1924 Summer Olympics.
