= Christophe Mirgain =

Luxembourgish sprinter

Personal information
- Nationality: Luxembourgish
- Born: 18 August 1902
- Died: 1 March 1999 (aged 96)

Sport
- Sport: Sprinting
- Event: 400 metres

Christophe Mirgain (18 August 1902 – 1 March 1999) was a Luxembourgish sprinter. He competed in the men's 400 metres at the 1924 Summer Olympics.
