= Emilio Casanovas =

Argentine sprinter (1905–??)

Personal information
- Nationality: Argentine
- Born: 22 April 1905

Sport
- Sport: Sprinting
- Event: 400 metres

Emilio Enrique Casanovas (born 22 April 1905, date of death unknown) was an Argentine sprinter. He competed in the men's 400 metres at the 1924 Summer Olympics.
