= Stanisław Świętochowski =

Polish sprinter (1899–1940)

Personal information
- Nationality: Polish
- Born: 4 August 1899
- Died: 25 December 1940 (aged 41)

Sport
- Sport: Sprinting
- Event: 400 metres

Stanisław Świętochowski (4 August 1899 – 25 December 1940) was a Polish sprinter. He competed in the men's 400 metres at the 1924 Summer Olympics. He was killed during World War II.
