= Edward Toms =

British sprinter

Olympic medal record

Men's athletics

Representing United Kingdom
Bronze medal – third place	1924 Paris	4x400 m relay

Edward James Toms (11 December 1899 – 2 January 1971) was a British athlete who competed mainly in the 1924 Summer Olympics.

Toms competed for Great Britain in the 1924 Summer Olympics held in Paris, France in the 4 x 400 metre relay where he won the bronze medal with his teammates George Renwick, Richard Ripley and Guy Butler. Toms also competed in the 400 metres event but was eliminated in the second round.
