= Horace Aylwin =

Canadian sprinter

Personal information
- Born: 1 October 1902 Carman, Manitoba, Canada
- Died: 25 July 1980 (aged 77)

Sport
- Sport: Sprinting
- Event: 400 metres

Horace Aylwin (1 October 1902 – 25 July 1980) was a Canadian sprinter. He competed in the men's 400 metres at the 1924 Summer Olympics.
