= Alan Christie =

Canadian sprinter

Personal information
- Full name: Alan Thomas Christie
- Born: 14 June 1905 Hamilton, Ontario, Canada
- Died: 9 January 2002 (aged 96)

Sport
- Sport: Sprinting
- Event: 400 metres

Alan Thomas Christie (14 June 1905 – 9 January 2002) was a Canadian sprinter. He competed in the men's 400 metres at the 1924 Summer Olympics.
