= Raymond Fritz =

French sprinter

Personal information
- Nationality: French
- Born: 9 December 1898 Paris, France
- Died: 28 October 1979 (aged 80)

Sport
- Sport: Sprinting
- Event: 400 metres

Raymond Fritz (9 December 1898 – 28 October 1979) was a French sprinter. He competed in the men's 400 metres at the 1924 Summer Olympics.
