= Richard Ripley =

British sprinter

Dick Ripley
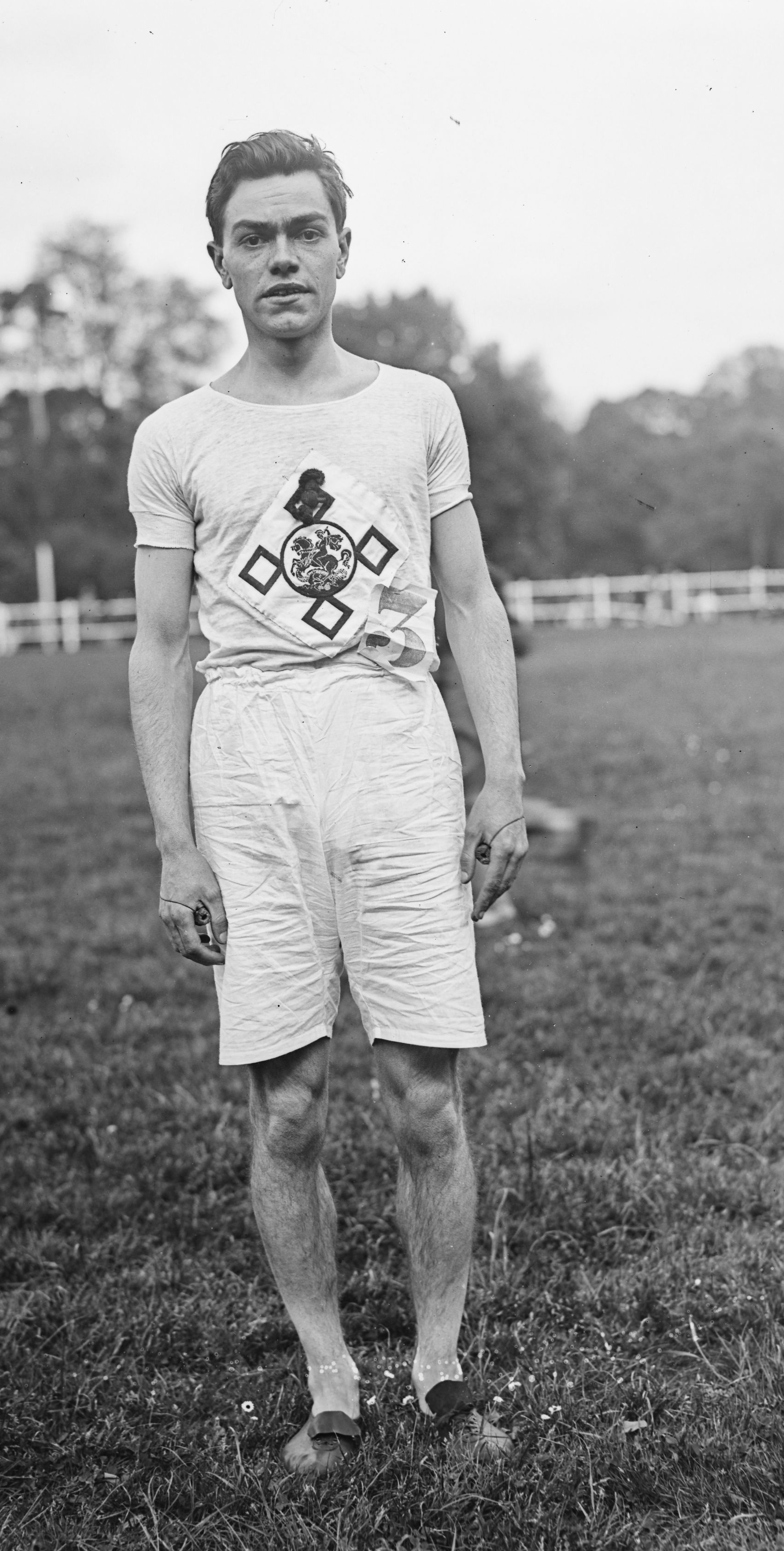
- Ripley in 1924

Personal information
- Nationality: British (Scottish)
- Born: 23 June 1901 Ormesby, Middlesbrough, England
- Died: 14 July 1996 (aged 95) Hartlepool, England

Sport
- Sport: Athletics
- Event: 440y/400m
- Club: Polytechnic Harriers
Medal record
Men's athletics
Representing Great Britain
Bronze medal – third place	1924 Paris	4x400 m relay

Richard Nicholson Ripley also known as Dick Ripley (23 June 1901 – 14 July 1996) was a British athlete who raced mainly in the 400 metres and competed at the 1924 Summer Olympics.

== Career ==
Ripley competed for Great Britain at the 1924 Olympics Games held in Paris, France, in the 4 x 400 metre relay, where he won the bronze medal with his teammates Edward Toms, George Renwick and Guy Butler.

The following year Ripley finished third behind Henry Stallard in the 440 yards event at the 1925 AAA Championships.
