= Shimen =

Shimen (traditional Chinese: 石門; simplified Chinese: 石门; pinyin: Shímén) may refer to:

== Mainland China ==
- Shimen County, Hunan
- Shijiazhuang, known as Shimen until 1948, the capital of Hebei province

Towns

- Shimen, Chongqing, in Jiangjin District
- Shimen, Tenzhu County, in Tenzhu (Tianzhu) Tibetan Autonomous County, Gansu
- Shimen, Lulong County, Hebei
- Shimen, Zunhua, Hebei
- Shimen, Jilin, in Antu County
- Shimen, Langao County, Shaanxi
- Shimen, Luonan County, Shaanxi
- Shimen, Xunyang County, Shaanxi
- Shimen, Shandong, in Linshu County
- Shimen, Jiangshan, Zhejiang
- Shimen, Tongxiang, Zhejiang

Townships

- Shimen Township, Anhui, in She County
- Shimen Township, Chongqing, in Yunyang County
- Shimen Township, Baiyin, in Jingyuan County, Gansu
- Shimen Township, Lintan County, Gansu
- Shimen Township, Longnan, in Wudu District, Longnan, Gansu
- Shimen Township, Guizhou, in Weining Yi, Hui, and Miao Autonomous County
- Shimen Township, Hebei, in Tang County
- Shimen Township, Henan, in Nanzhao County
- Shimen Township, Huaihua, in Hecheng District, Huaihua, Hunan
- Shimen Township, Longhui County, Hunan
- Shimen Township, Jiangxi, in Jinxi County
- Shimen Township, Shaanxi, in Ganquan County
- Shimen Township, Shanxi, in Wenxi County
- Shimen Township, Sichuan, in Cangxi County

== Taiwan ==
- Shimen District, New Taipei
- Shimen Dam, a gravity dam in Taoyuan County
