= Christian Simmen =

Swiss sprinter

Personal information
- Nationality: Swiss
- Born: 1899

Sport
- Sport: Sprinting
- Event: 400 metres

Christian Simmen (born 1899, date of death unknown) was a Swiss sprinter. He competed in the men's 400 metres at the 1924 Summer Olympics.
