= Simen Lieungh =

Norwegian businessperson (born 1960)

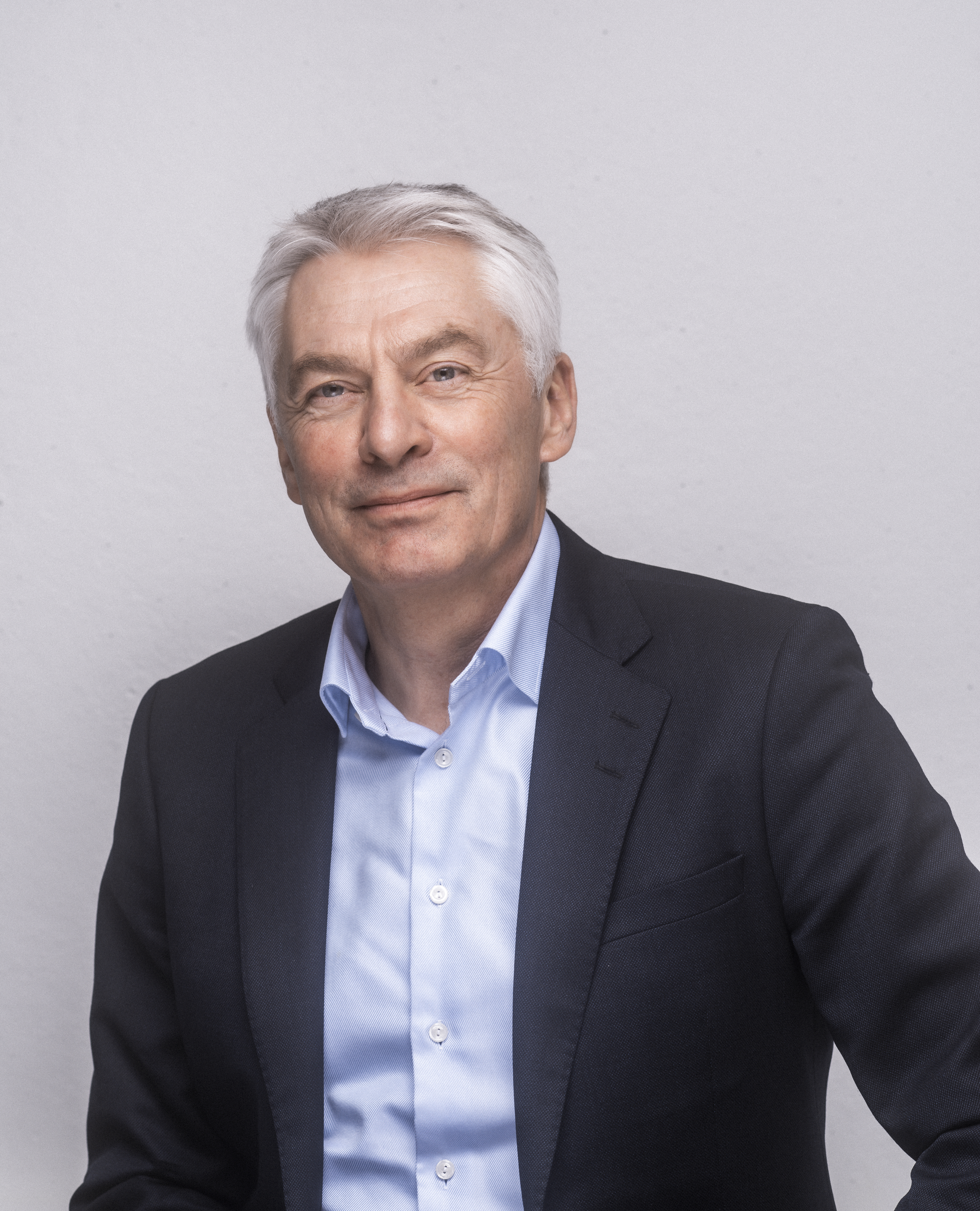
Simen Lieungh

Simen Lieungh (born 16 March 1960) is a Norwegian businessperson.

He is the chief executive officer (CEO) of Odfjell Technology, a position he has held since 2022. He was previously CEO of Odfjell Drilling from 2010 to 2022.

Lieungh was hired as CEO of Aker Solutions in 2008. He was Director of Field Development in Aker Solutions from 2002 to 2007, and CEO of Arne Blystad AS from 2007 to 2008. He holds a degree in Mechanical Engineering from the Norwegian University of Science and Technology, and has worked as a researcher at the Norwegian Defence Research Establishment.

He resides in Nittedal.
