= Tokushige Noto =

Japanese sprinter (1902–1991)

Personal information
- Nationality: Japanese
- Born: 24 January 1902 Jōjima, Fukuoka
- Died: 4 January 1991 (aged 88)

Sport
- Sport: Sprinting
- Event(s): 400 metres, 800 metres, and decathlon

Tokushige Noto (納戸 徳重, Noto Tokushige; 24 January 1902 – 4 January 1991) was a Japanese sprinter who competed in the men's 400 metres, men's 800 metres, and the men's decathlon at the 1924 Summer Olympics in Paris, France.
