= Lawrence Betts =

South African sprinter

Personal information
- Nationality: South African
- Born: 4 August 1904 Pretoria, Transvaal Colony
- Died: 28 April 1984 (aged 79) Vereeniging, South Africa

Sport
- Sport: Track and field
- Event(s): 100m, 400m

Lawrence Betts (4 August 1904 – 28 April 1984) was a South African sprinter. He competed in three events at the 1924 Summer Olympics.
