= Roy Cochran (athlete) =

American sprinter and hurdler

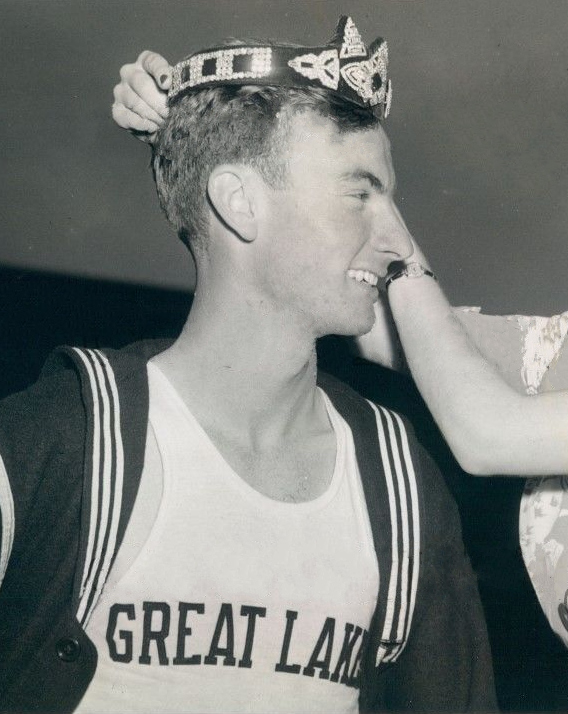
- Cochran in 1942

Personal information
- Born: January 6, 1919 Richton, Mississippi, U.S.
- Died: September 26, 1981 (aged 62) Gig Harbor, Washington, U.S.
- Height: 178 cm (5 ft 10 in)
- Weight: 70 kg (154 lb)

Sport
- Sport: Athletics
- Events: 400 m, 400 m hurdles
- Club: Los Angeles Athletic Club
- Coached by: Billy Hayes; Commodore Cochran

Achievements and titles
- Personal bests: 400 m – 46.7 (1946); 400 mH – 51.1 (1948)
Medal record
Men's athletics
Representing the United States
Olympic Games
Gold medal – first place	1948 London	400 m hurdles
Gold medal – first place	1948 London	4 × 400 m relay

LeRoy Braxton Cochran (January 6, 1919 – September 26, 1981) was an American sprinter and hurdler, winner of two gold medals at the 1948 Summer Olympics.

Born in Richton, Mississippi, as the ninth of ten children to a sportive family. Cochran played football and was a one-man track team in the high school. Cochran wanted to go to Tulane University with a football scholarship, but was persuaded by his older brother Commodore, who won a gold medal at 1924 Summer Olympics in 4 × 400 m relay, to go to Indiana University Bloomington with a track scholarship. Commodore later became also his coach.

After winning the AAU championships in 400 m hurdles in 1939, Cochran was selected to the 1940 US Olympic team to run 400 m flat, 400 m hurdles and 4 × 400 m relay race. But when the 1940 Summer Olympics were cancelled due to the World War II, Cochran entered the V-7 Navy officer training course in 1942, and went to Miami for training in the Navy's Sub Chaser Training School. He served in the Pacific during the war and attended the University of Southern California in pursuit of graduate degrees in physiology after the war.

Cochran took up athletics again at USC and in 1942 set world indoor records in the 400 m and 440 yd and a world outdoor record in the 440 yd. He won his second AAU title in 400 m hurdles in 1948, thus qualifying to the Olympics. In the Olympic final Duncan White from Ceylon went off at a terrific pace, but by half distance Cochran was ahead. He won by a huge margin, beating second-placed White by 0.7 seconds. Cochran won his second gold medal as he ran the third leg of the 4 × 400 m relay for the winning USA team.

In 2010 Cochran was posthumously named to the National Track and Field Hall of Fame.
