= George Renwick (athlete) =

British sprinter

Personal information
- Nationality: British (English)
- Born: 7 August 1901 Marylebone, England
- Died: 25 July 1984 (aged 82) Chichester, England

Sport
- Sport: Athletics
- Event: 400m/440y
- Club: University of Oxford AC; Achilles Club
Medal record
Men's athletics
Representing Great Britain
Bronze medal – third place	1924 Paris	4x400 m relay

George Russell Renwick (7 August 1901 – 25 July 1984) was a British athlete who primarily raced over 400 metres and competed at the 1924 Summer Olympics.

== Biography ==
Renwick was born in Marylebone, England and studied at New College, Oxford. He gained his Oxford blue in 1923 and 1924 for the 440 yards and 100 yards respectively and served on the committee of the OUAC.

He competed for Great Britain in the 1924 Olympics Games held in Paris, France, in the 4 x 400 metre relay where he won the bronze medal with his team mates Edward Toms, Richard Ripley and Guy Butler.

Renwick was headmaster of Dover College from 1934 to 1954 during a difficult period. He evacuated the College to Poltimore House in Devon in World War II. On its return to Dover in 1945, he continued the expansion of the College and promoted it as a centre of sporting excellence.
