= Alan Helffrich =

Athletics competitor

Personal information
- Full name: Alan Boone Helffrich
- Born: August 7, 1900 Yonkers, New York, U.S.
- Died: February 3, 1994 (aged 93) Dunedin, Florida, U.S.
Medal record
Men's athletics
Representing the United States
Olympic Games
Gold medal – first place	1924 Paris	4 × 400 metres relay

Alan Boone Helffrich (August 7, 1900 – February 3, 1994) was an American athlete, winner of gold medal in 4 × 400 m relay at the 1924 Summer Olympics.

Born in Yonkers, New York, Alan Helffrich was one of America's greatest middle-distance runners in the 1920s. Helffrich won the AAU titles in 880 yd in 1921, 1922 and 1925. As a Pennsylvania State University student, he won the NCAA championships in 880 yd in 1922 and 1923 and IC4A championships in 880 yd in 1923 and in 440 yd in 1924.

At the Paris Olympics, Helffrich ran the final leg in the American 4 × 400 m relay team, which won the gold medal with a new world record of 3.16.0. Helffrich was the only runner to defeat Paavo Nurmi when the Finn toured the United States in 1925, scoring a victory in the half-mile run at the Yankee Stadium. He ended Nurmi's 121-race win streak that had started in 1921.

After his running career, Helffrich officiated at athletics meets in New York City from 1930 to 1955 and served, until his death at age 93, as president of the New York Chapter of the United States Olympians.

== See also ==
- List of Pennsylvania State University Olympians
