= Horatio Fitch =

American athlete (1900–1985)

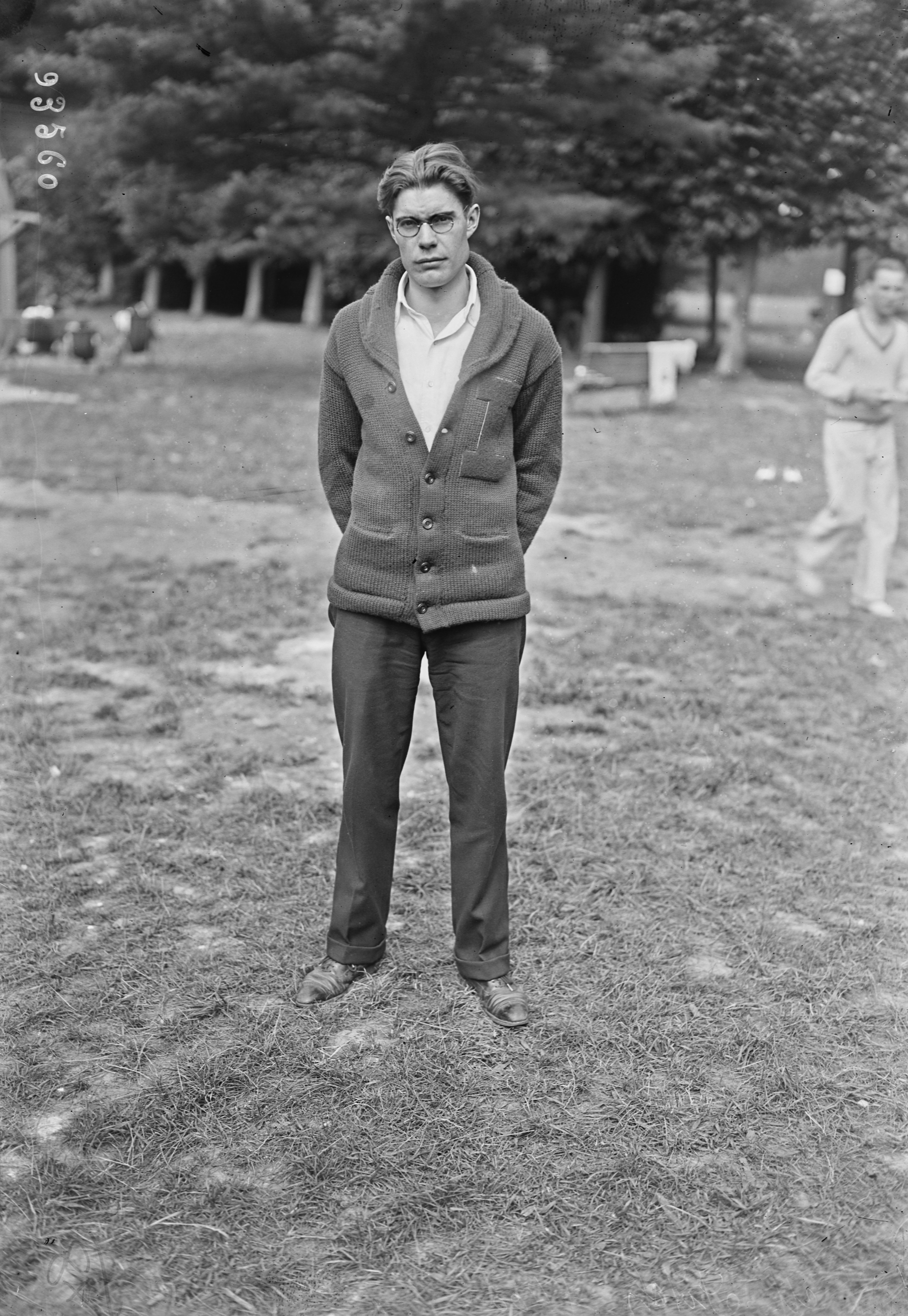
- Horatio Fitch 1924

Medal record

Men's athletics

Representing the United States
Silver medal – second place	1924 Paris	400 metres

Horatio May Fitch (December 16, 1900 Chicago, Illinois – May 4, 1985 Estes Park, Colorado) was an American athlete who competed mainly in the 400 metres.

Fitch was an All-American runner for the Illinois Fighting Illini track and field team, placing 4th in the 400 m at the 1923 NCAA Track and Field Championships.

He competed for the United States in the 1924 Summer Olympics held in Paris in the 400 metres where he won the silver medal, an event memorialized by the 1982 hit movie Chariots of Fire. The race winner was Eric Liddell, who had passed up the 100-metre dash, his specialty, because it was being held on Sunday.

After graduating with a degree in engineering, Fitch went to work for a company building Chicago's new Union Station. He found time, however, to compete for the Chicago Athletic Association. After winning the 1923 AAU 440-yard national championship with a time of 50.0 seconds, he was invited to participate in the Olympic tryouts at Harvard the month before the Paris Games. He finished behind Taylor, a Princeton graduate, who set a new world record of 48.1 in the semifinals and was one of nine quartermilers the U.S. took to Paris.
