= Gustaf Wejnarth =

Swedish sprinter

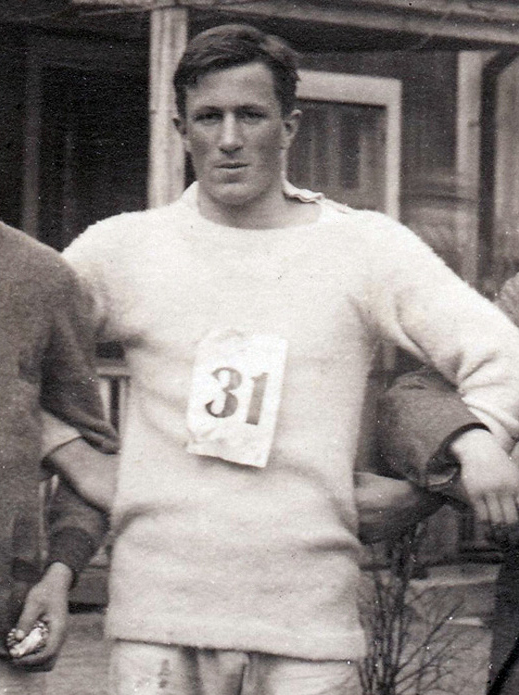

Personal information
- Born: 24 April 1902 Eskilstuna, Sweden
- Died: 22 April 1990 (aged 87) Örebro, Sweden

Sport
- Sport: Athletics
- Event: Sprint
- Club: SoIK Hellas

Achievements and titles
- Personal bests: 100 m – 11.0 (1922); 400 m – 49.8 (1921)
Medal record
Representing Sweden
Olympic Games
Silver medal – second place	1924 Paris	4×400 m relay

Carl Gustaf Olof Wejnarth (24 April 1902 – 22 April 1990) was a Swedish sprinter who competed in the 1924 Summer Olympics. He won a silver medal in the 4 × 400 m relay and failed to reach the final of the individual 400 m event.
