= Commodore Cochran =

American sprinter

Olympic medal record

Men's athletics

Representing the United States
Gold medal – first place	1924 Paris	4 × 400 m relay

Commodore Shelton "Com" Cochran (January 20, 1902 – January 3, 1969) was an American athlete, winner of a gold medal in 4 × 400 m relay at the 1924 Summer Olympics.

He was born in Mississippi and died in San Francisco, California.

As a Mississippi State University student, Commodore Cochran won the NCAA championships in 440-yard dash in 1922 and 1923.

At the Paris Olympics, Cochran ran the opening leg in American 4 × 400 m relay team, which won the gold medal with a new world record of 3:16.0.

After his running career, Cochran coached his younger brother Roy Cochran, who won two gold medals at the 1948 Summer Olympics.
