= Oliver Macdonald =

American Olympic competitor

Olympic medal record

Men's athletics

Representing the United States
Gold medal – first place	1924 Paris	4 × 400 m relay

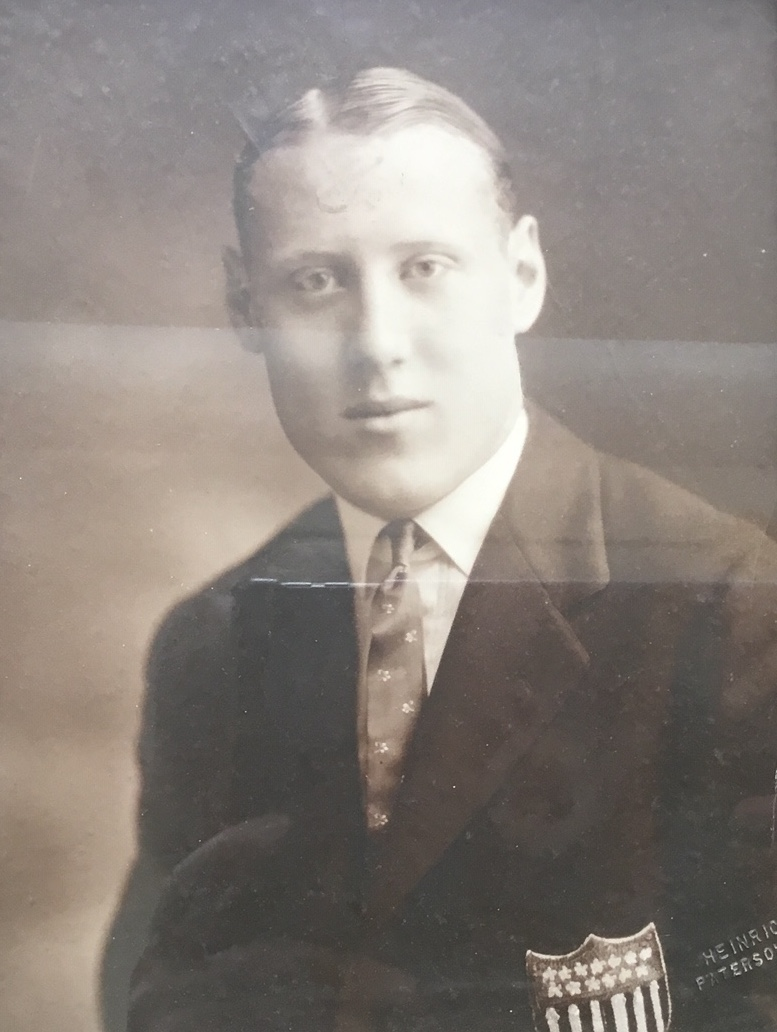
John Oliver Macdonald in his Olympic jacket

J. Oliver Macdonald (February 20, 1904 in Paterson, New Jersey - April 14, 1973 in Flemington, New Jersey) was an American athlete, winner of gold medal in 4 × 400 m relay at the 1924 Summer Olympics.

At the Paris Olympics, John Oliver Macdonald ran the third leg in the American 4 × 400 m relay team, which won the gold medal with a new world record of 3.16.0.

John Oliver MacDonald graduated from the University of Pennsylvania in 1927. During his HS and college career he won 91 medals. He was known as Mac during his racing career and later JO by family and friends. He had two children, Judith L. Macdonald and Jay Oliver Macdonald, deceased. He had a granddaughter Shereen Macdonald.

He had a successful dental career and was elected as a delegate from New Jersey's 8th congressional district to the 1936 Republican National Convention. He owned purebred Beagles and use to run his dogs in sanctioned field trials. He retired in 1960 and moved to Flemington, NJ and sold real estate.
