= Nils Engdahl =

Swedish runner (1898–1983)

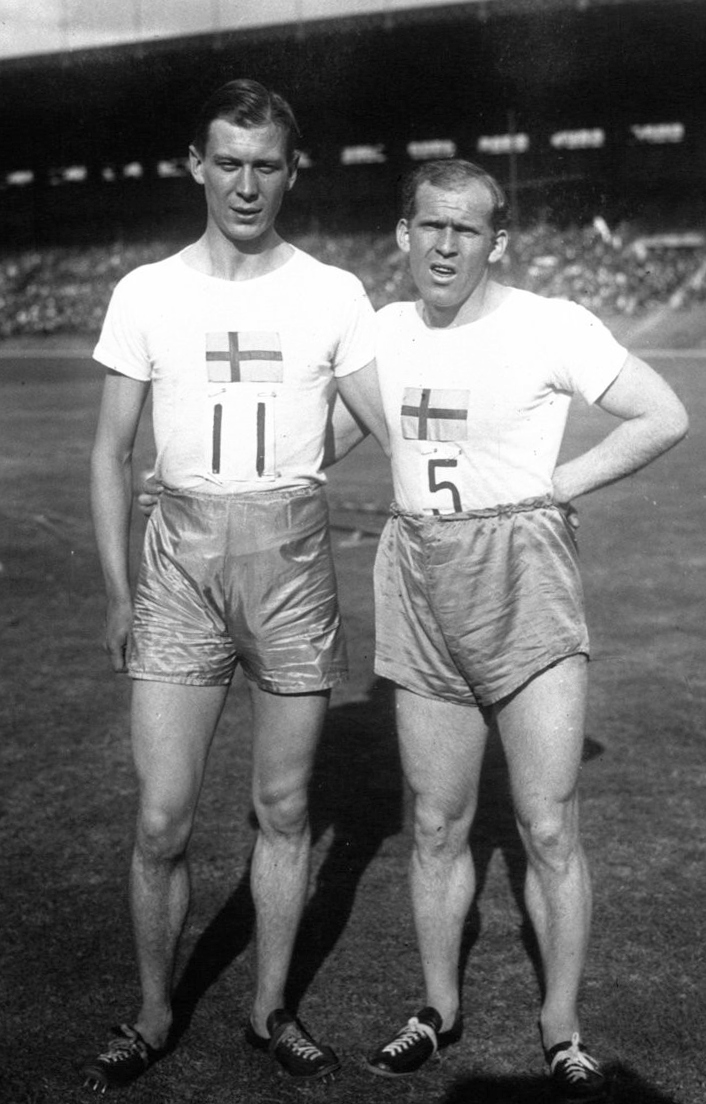
- Engdahl (left) in 1926

Personal information
- Born: 4 November 1898 Västerhaninge, Sweden
- Died: 10 September 1983 (aged 84) Bromma, Sweden
- Height: 1.65 m (5 ft 5 in)
- Weight: 57 kg (126 lb)

Sport
- Sport: Athletics
- Event: 100–800 m
- Club: Järva IS, Ulriksdal, Solna

Achievements and titles
- Personal bests: 100 m – 10.7 (1920); 400 m – 48.2 (1924); 800 m – 1:57.5 (1920)
Medal record
Representing Sweden
Olympic Games
Bronze medal – third place	1920 Antwerp	400 m
Silver medal – second place	1924 Paris	4×400 m relay

Nils Engdahl (4 November 1898 – 10 September 1983) was a Swedish runner who competed at the 1920 and 1924 Summer Olympics.

== Career ==
Together with his brother, Wille Engdahl, Nils Engdahl played football for IFK Stockholm before changing to athletics in 1917. He finished second behind Guy Butler in the 440 yards event at the British 1919 AAA Championships.

At the Olympic Games, Engdahl had his best achievements in the 4 × 400 m relay, in which his teams finished fifth and second in 1920 and 1924, respectively. Individually he won a bronze medal in the 400 m in 1920.

From 1920 to 1935 he held Swedish records in the 200 m and from 1918 to 1934 in the 400 m. Between 1918 and 1927 he won four national titles in the 100 m, six in the 200 m, and six in the 400 m. He was the best Swedish runner over 100–400 m distances for three consecutive years. In addition he played bandy for Järva IS until 1937. He later married Olympic diver Signe Johansson.
