= Artur Svensson =

Swedish sprinter (1901–1984)

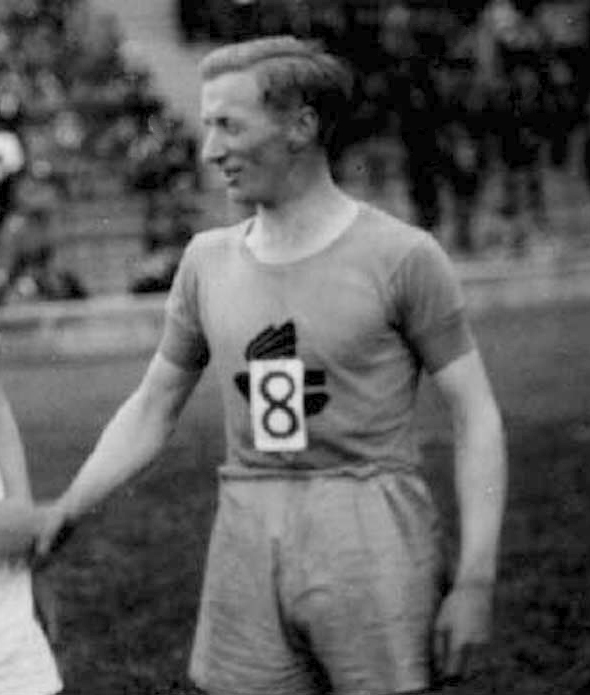

Personal information
- Born: 16 January 1901 Finspång, Sweden
- Died: 20 January 1984 (aged 83) Finspång, Sweden

Sport
- Sport: Athletics
- Event: Sprint
- Club: Finspångs IK

Achievements and titles
- Personal bests: 400 m – 49.1 (1924); 800 m – 1:53.5 (1925)
Medal record
Representing Sweden
Olympic Games
Silver medal – second place	1924 Paris	4×400 m relay

Artur Hjalmar Sölve Svensson (16 January 1901 – 20 January 1984) was a Swedish sprinter who competed in the 1924 Summer Olympics. He won a silver medal in the 4 × 400 m relay and failed to reach the final of the individual 400 m event.
