= Erik Byléhn =

Swedish middle-distance runner

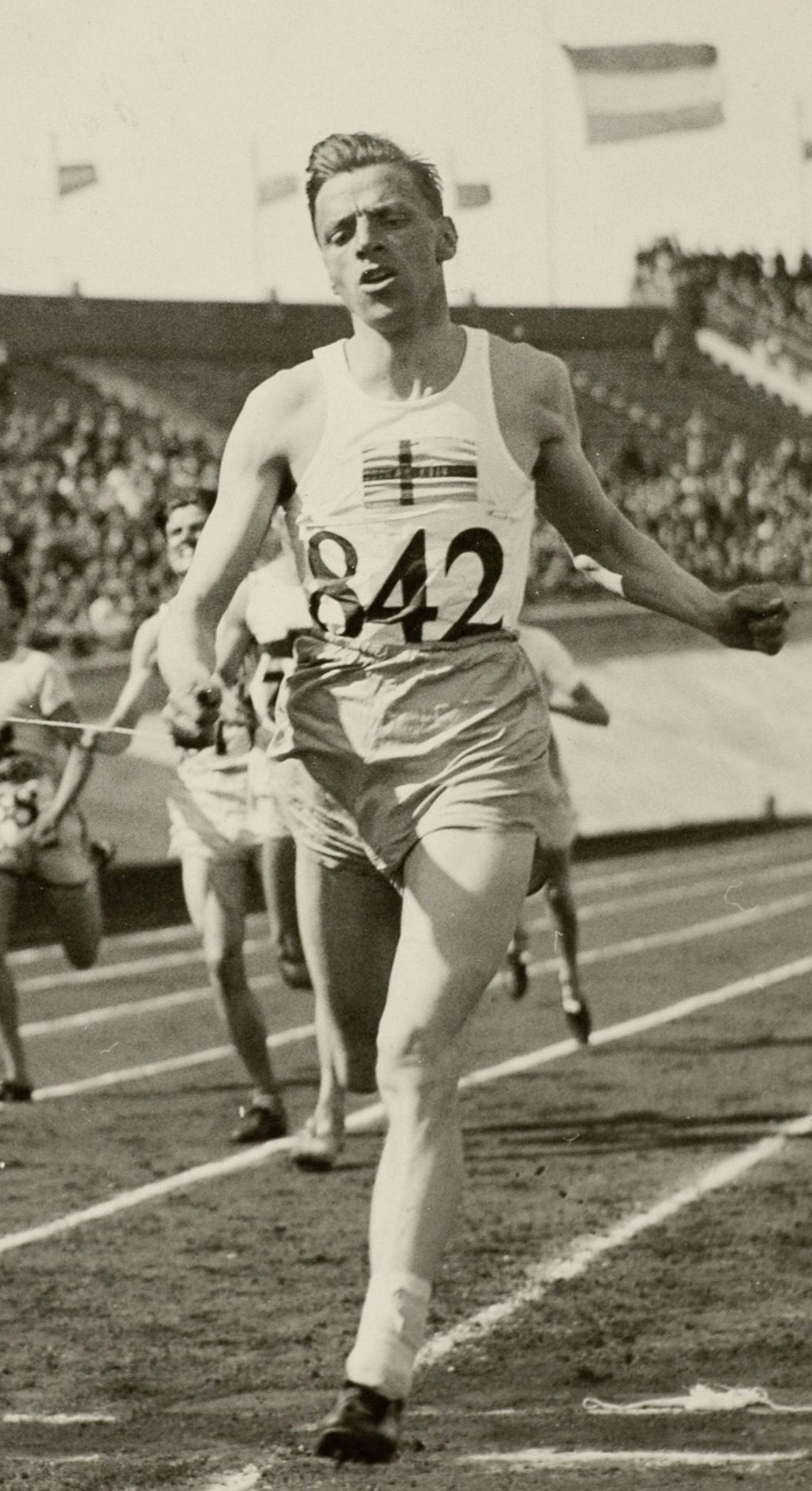
- Byléhn at the 1928 Olympics

Personal information
- Nationality: Swedish
- Born: 15 January 1898 Bollnäs, Sweden
- Died: 14 November 1986 (aged 88) Uppsala, Sweden
- Height: 1.72 m (5 ft 8 in)
- Weight: 61 kg (134 lb)

Sport
- Country: Sweden
- Sport: Athletics
- Events: 400 m, 800 m
- Club: SoIK Hellas

Achievements and titles
- Personal bests: 400 m – 48.7 (1924); 800 m – 1:52.8e (1928)
Medal record
Representing Sweden
Olympic Games
Silver medal – second place	1924 Paris	4×400 metre relay
Silver medal – second place	1928 Amsterdam	800 metres

Bror Erik Byléhn (15 January 1898 – 14 November 1986) was a middle-distance runner from Sweden who competed at the 1924 and 1928 Olympics. In 1924 he won a silver medal in the 4 × 400 m relay and failed to reach the finals of individual 400 m and 800 m races. Four years later he won a silver medal in the 800 m, whereas his 4 × 400 m team finished in fourth place.

Byléhn worked as a veterinary doctor in Karlstad, and later moved to the United States.
