= Guy Butler (athlete) =

British sprinter (1899–1981)

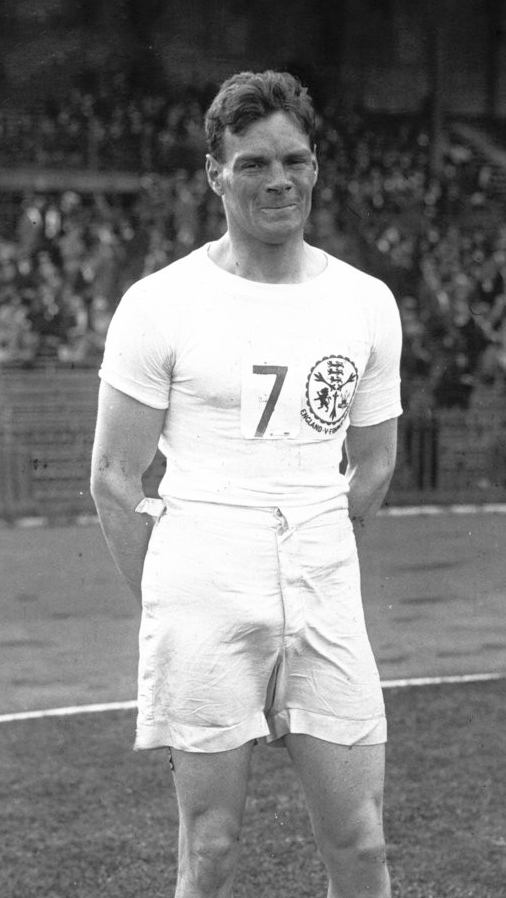
- Butler in 1926

Personal information
- Born: 25 August 1899 Harrow, Great Britain
- Died: 22 February 1981 (aged 81) St Neots, Huntingdonshire, England
- Education: University of Cambridge

Sport
- Sport: Athletics
- Events: 200 m, 400 m
- Club: University of Cambridge AC; Achilles Club

Achievements and titles
- Personal bests: 200 m – 21.7 (1927); 400 m – 48.0 (1924)
Medal record
Men's athletics
Representing Great Britain
Olympic Games
Gold medal – first place	1920 Antwerp	4 × 400 m relay
Silver medal – second place	1920 Antwerp	400 metres
Bronze medal – third place	1924 Paris	400 metres
Bronze medal – third place	1924 Paris	4 × 400 m relay

Guy Montagu Butler (25 August 1899 – 22 February 1981) was a British sprinter, winner of the gold medal in the 4 × 400 m relay at the 1920 Summer Olympics. With four Olympic medals Guy Butler shares the British record for the number of medals in athletics with Sebastian Coe, Christine Ohuruogu, and Mo Farah.

== Biography ==
Butler was born in Harrow, Middlesex, to Edward Montagu Butler and Gertrude Mary Fair. He was the grandson of academic Henry Montagu Butler and nephew of Sir James Ramsay Montagu Butler and Sir Nevile Butler.

He attended the prestigious Harrow School, the Royal Military Academy Sandhurst, and Trinity College, Cambridge. His father also attended Harrow and competed in cricket and athletics at the national level. At the Antwerp Olympics in 1920, Butler won the silver medal in the individual 400 m and anchored the British 4 × 400 m relay team to a gold medal in 3:22.2. At the 1924 Summer Olympics, he won bronze in the 400 m and again anchored the British 4 × 400 m relay team, this time winning bronze in 3:17.4. In 1928 he became the first British track and field athlete to compete in three Olympics; he reached a 200 m quarterfinal, and retired shortly thereafter.

Butler became the National 440 yards champion after winning the AAA Championships title at the 1919 AAA Championships. The following year in 1920 and also in 1923, he was the highest placed British Athlete in the same event at the Championships and therefore is listed as the British champion for those years.

He also won the British AAA Championships in 220 yd (200 m) in 1926. He also ran the 300 yd (270 m) world record of 30.6 in 1926. In retirement, Butler was a schoolmaster, then an athletics journalist, and a pioneer of filming athletes in action. He contributed to the design of the White City Stadium and worked as the athletics correspondent for The Morning Post until it was merged with The Daily Telegraph in 1937.
