= Athletics at the 1928 Summer Olympics – Men's 1500 metres =

Men's 1500 metres at the Games of the IX Olympiad
- Olympic Athletics
- Venue: Olympic Stadium
- Dates: August 1, 1928 (heats); August 2, 1928 (final)
- Competitors: 44 from 19 nations
- Winning time: 3:53.2 OR

Medalists
1st place, gold medalist(s)		Harri Larva; Finland
2nd place, silver medalist(s)		Jules Ladoumègue; France
3rd place, bronze medalist(s)		Eino Purje; Finland

The men's 1500 metre event at the 1928 Olympic Games took place between August 1 & August 2. Forty-four athletes from 19 nations competed. NOCs were limited to 4 competitors each. The event was won by Harri Larva of Finland, the nation's second consecutive victory in the 1500 metres. France won its first medal in the event since 1900, with Jules Ladoumègue's silver matching the nation's best result.

== Background ==
This was the eighth appearance of the event, which is one of 12 athletics events to have been held at every Summer Olympics. Sixth-place finisher Lloyd Hahn of the United States was the only finalist from the 1924 Games to return. Defending champion Paavo Nurmi of Finland was in Amsterdam, but competed only in longer distances this Games. Finland was still well-represented, however, as Eino Purje and Harri Larva were among the favorites, along with Jules Ladoumègue of France and world-record holder Otto Peltzer of Germany.

Argentina and Yugoslavia each made their first appearance in the event. The United States made its eighth appearance, the only nation to have competed in the men's 1500 metres at each Games to that point.

== Competition format ==
The competition consisted of two rounds, the format used since 1908. As in 1924, there were six semifinals, this time with anywhere between 6 and 9 runners in each, and once again the top two runners in each heat advanced to the final, for a 12-man final race.

== Records ==
These were the standing world and Olympic records (in minutes) prior to the 1928 Summer Olympics.

World record	Otto Peltzer (GER)	3:51.0	Berlin, Germany	11 September 1926
Olympic record	Paavo Nurmi (FIN)	3:53.6	Paris, France	10 July 1924

In the final Harri Larva set a new Olympic record at 3:53.2.

== Schedule ==
Date	Time	Round
Wednesday, 1 August 1928	16:15	Semifinals
Thursday, 2 August 1928	15:30	Final

== Results ==
=== Semifinals ===
The top two runners from each of the six heats advanced to the Final Round.

==== Semifinal 1 ====
Rank	Athlete	Nation	Time	Notes
1	Hans Wichmann	Germany	4:03.0	Q
2	Adolf Kittel	Czechoslovakia	Unknown	Q
3	József Marton	Hungary	Unknown	
4	Luigi Becalli	Italy	Unknown	
5	Guus Zeegers	Netherlands	Unknown	
6	George Hyde	Australia	Unknown	
7	Józef Jaworski	Poland	4:14.0	
8	Séra Martin	France	Unknown	
—	Gerry Coughlan	Ireland	DNS	
—	Joquin Miquel	Spain	DNS	

==== Semifinal 2 ====
Rank	Athlete	Nation	Time	Notes
1	Herbert Böcher	Germany	3:59.6	Q
2	William Whyte	Australia	3:59.9	Q
3	Armas Kinnunen	Finland	4:01.5	
4	Albert Larsen	Denmark	4:01.5	
5	Reidar Jørgensen	Norway	4:01.6	
6	Jack Walter	Canada	Unknown	
—	Frédéric du Hen	Netherlands	DNF	
—	Gyula Belloni	Hungary	DNF	
—	Lloyd Hahn	United States	DNF	
—	Andreas Paouris	Greece	DNS	

==== Semifinal 3 ====
Rank	Athlete	Nation	Time	Notes
1	Eino Purje	Finland	4:00.8	Q
2	Jules Ladoumègue	France	Unknown	Q
3	Stan Ashby	Great Britain	Unknown	
4	Vilém Šindler	Czechoslovakia	Unknown	
5	Serafín Dengra	Argentina	Unknown	
6	Luka Predanić	Yugoslavia	4:27.0	
7	Pete Walter	Canada	Unknown	
8	Jan Zeegers	Netherlands	Unknown	
—	Grigorios Georgakopoulos	Greece	DNS	
—	Gábor Gyulay	Hungary	DNS	

==== Semifinal 4 ====
Rank	Athlete	Nation	Time	Notes
1	Paul Martin	Switzerland	4:00.8	Q
2	Harri Larva	Finland	4:02.0	Q
3	Reg Thomas	Great Britain	Unknown	
4	David Griffin	Canada	Unknown	
5	Leopoldo Ledesma	Argentina	Unknown	
—	Sid Robinson	United States	DNF	
—	Antonios Mangos	Greece	DNS	
—	Georges Baraton	France	DNS	
—	Ömer Besim Koşalay	Turkey	DNS	
—	Robert Masino	Monaco	DNS	

==== Semifinal 5 ====
Rank	Athlete	Nation	Time	Notes
1	Ray Conger	United States	4:02.6	Q
2	Jean Keller	France	4:02.7	Q
3	Edvin Wide	Sweden	Unknown	
4	Otto Peltzer	Germany	Unknown	
5	Alex Docherty	Canada	Unknown	
6	Reggie Bell	Great Britain	Unknown	
—	Vasilios Stavrinos	Greece	DNS	
—	Ciro Chapa	Mexico	DNS	
—	Philippe Coenjaerts	Belgium	DNS	
—	Juichi Nagatani	Japan	DNS	

==== Semifinal 6 ====
Rank	Athlete	Nation	Time	Notes
1	Cyril Ellis	Great Britain	4:01.8	Q
2	Hans-Helmuth Krause	Germany	Unknown	Q
3	Nick Carter	United States	Unknown	
4	Leo Helgas	Finland	4:06.0	
5	Danie Jacobs	South Africa	Unknown	
6	Czesław Foryś	Poland	4:11.5	
7	Wilhelm Effern	Netherlands	Unknown	
—	Jesús Oyarbide	Spain	DNS	
—	Gurbachan Singh	India	DNS	

=== Final ===
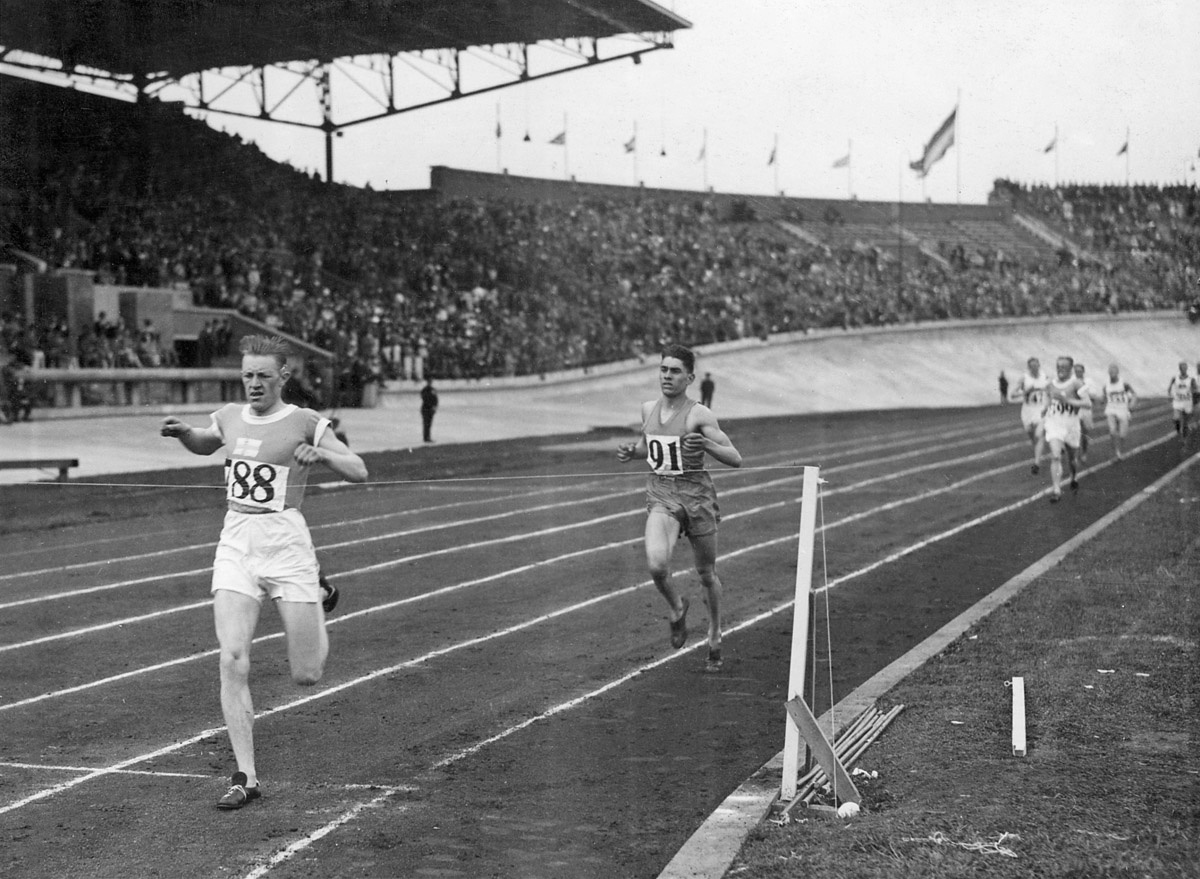
Finish of the 1500 m final: first Harri Larva, second Jules Ladoumègue

Rank	Athlete	Nation	Time	Notes
1st place, gold medalist(s)	Harri Larva	Finland	3:53.2	OR
2nd place, silver medalist(s)	Jules Ladoumègue	France	3:53.8	
3rd place, bronze medalist(s)	Eino Purje	Finland	3:56.4	
4	Hans Wichmann	Germany	3:56.8	
5	Cyril Ellis	Great Britain	3:57.6	
6	Paul Martin	Switzerland	3:58.4	
7	Hans-Helmuth Krause	Germany	3:59.0	
8	Adolf Kittel	Czechoslovakia	4:00.4	
9	William Whyte	Australia	4:00.4	
10	Ray Conger	United States	Unknown	
11	Jean Keller	France	Unknown	
—	Herbert Böcher	Germany	DNF	
