= Jules Ladoumègue =

French middle-distance runner

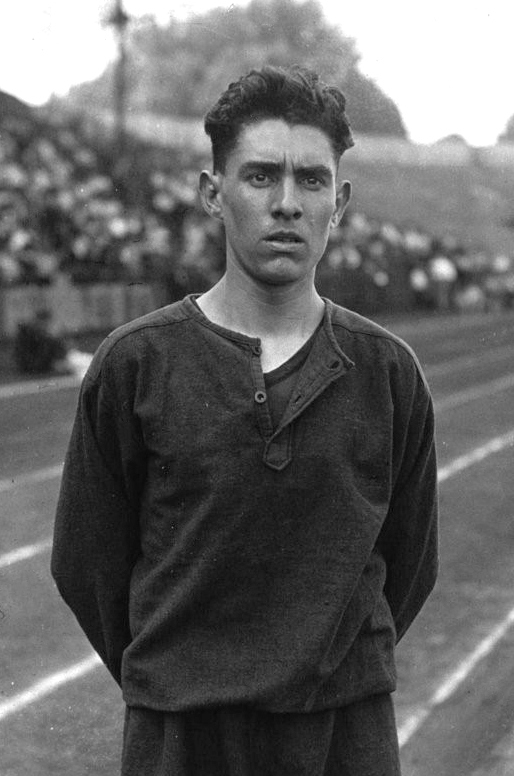
- Jules Ladoumègue in 1928

Personal information
- Born: 10 December 1906 Bordeaux, France
- Died: 2 March 1973 (aged 66) Paris, France
- Height: 1.71 m (5 ft 7 in)
- Weight: 59 kg (130 lb)

Sport
- Sport: Athletics
- Event: 800-5000 m
- Club: Stade français, Paris

Achievements and titles
- Personal best(s): 800 m - 1:52.0 (1928); 1500 m - 3:49.2 (1930); Mile - 4:09.2 (1931); 5000 m - 15:03.2 (1928)
Medal record
Representing France
Olympic Games
Silver medal – second place	1928 Amsterdam	1,500 metres

Jules Ladoumègue (French: [ʒyl ladumɛg]; 10 December 1906 – 2 March 1973) was a French middle-distance runner. He became a running star as the sport enjoyed a huge resurgence at the start of the Great Depression, fueled in large part by newsreel coverage. His career was abruptly cut short when he was banned for life from track for payments he received for several races.

== Early running career ==
Ladoumègue was born at La Bastide, Bordeaux. He made his first impression in the track world by finishing third in the 1926 French 5000 m championship while still a teenager. Later that year, he improved his 5000 m time with a 15:11 3/5 run against the United Kingdom, finishing the year ranked 20th in the event.

Despite his success, Ladoumègue was discouraged by a French track expert who said his long strides were not suited for long distances, so he moved down to the 1500 m in 1927. However, he did not find much success that year, running a best of only 4:03.6 and finishing sixth in the French championships.

In 1928, he started to run for Stade Français under famed coach Charles Poulenard, and his improvement was dramatic. On 3 June, Ladoumègue ran 3:58.0, then 3:55.2 a week later. Two weeks after that, he ran 15:03.2 over 5000 m. Then, on 1 July, he won the Paris championships in 3:54.6, followed by a victory in the French championships in 3:52.2. The latter time ranked Ladoumègue as third-fastest all-time over the distance and a favourite at the 1928 Olympics in Amsterdam.

== 1928 Olympics ==
The Olympic 1500 m final was held on 2 August. In the end, the battle came down to a race between Ladoumègue and two Finnish runners: Eino Purje and Harri Larva. Larva and Purje exchanged leads early on, with Ladoumègue in the pack behind. After 800 m, Ladoumègue chased down the leading Finns and on the backstretch of the final lap, took the lead from Purje. As Purje faded, Larva pursued Ladoumègue. Into the homestretch, Larva pulled even, but Ladoumègue held his ground. Then, with 20 meters remaining, Larva pulled ahead. Ladoumègue, seeing it was hopeless, eased up and finished second.

== World records ==
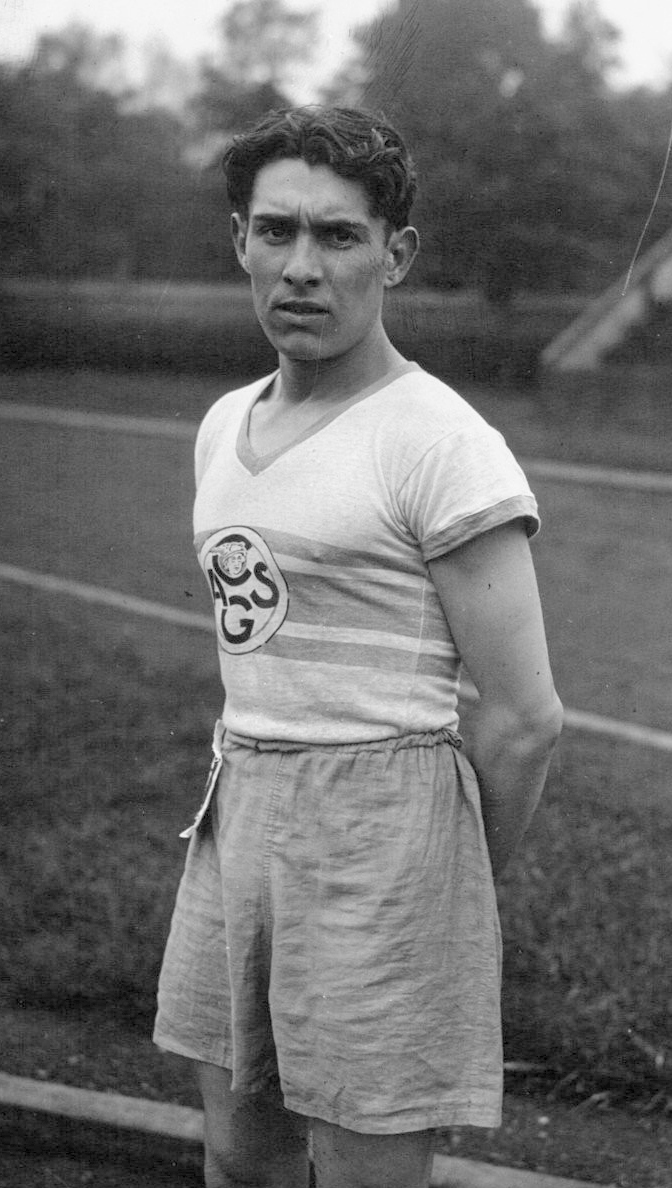
Jules Ladoumègue in 1930

Stung by criticism that he lacked the kick to win close races after his Olympic disappointment, Ladoumègue sought to prove the experts wrong. Accordingly, he ran in several races in 1929 where he allowed the pace to slow, waiting for the homestretch to drive for the finish. But when he tried that strategy against Cyril Ellis on 28 July at Colombes, France, Ellis defeated him 4:04 to 4:04.2. Ladoumègue suffered the same result a week later in Berlin against his Olympic rival Larva.

By 1930, however, it was clear that Ladoumègue could win a race in any manner he chose. On 13 July he ran 3:53.8, then he avenged the humiliation he received the year before from Ellis by defeating him over the mile 4:15.2 to 4:20.2 in London on 2 August. Reg Thomas was second at 4:17.2.

A series of races followed, including a convincing defeat of 1500 m record-holder Otto Peltzer 3:53.7 to 3:59.0. Ladoumègue now felt ready to attempt to break Peltzer's 3:51.0 world record.

The attempt was made 3 October on the 450-metre track at Stade Jean Bouin, near Ladoumègue's home in Paris. He aimed for 500-metre split times of 1:16, 1:17 and 1:17, which would total 3:50, a new world record. Séra Martin and Jean Keller were pace-setters, and included in the field was an Italian then considered to be a mediocre runner - Luigi Beccali.

Keller led the field through 400 m in 58.6 and 500 m in 1:13.4. Sensing he was running too fast, Keller slowed but Ladoumègue, feeling fresh, yelled "Plus vite, plus vite!" Keller hit 800 m in 2:00.4 and dropped out. Martin took over the pace-setting chore, and hit 1000 m in 2:33.0, exactly on schedule. Martin continued for only a few more metres before dropping out. At the bell, Ladoumègue and Beccali were alone. Ladoumègue increased the pace, hitting 1200 m in 3:05.0 - 1.0 seconds faster than Peltzer's record pace, but Ladoumègue feared he lacked Peltzer's kick so he ran hard all the way.

He struggled through the final homestretch, later saying "My legs were like lead in that final lap." He crossed the line and three watches recorded his time as 3:49 1/5, two at 3:49.0. The slower time was taken as the official time, and Ladoumègue not only had the record, he became the first sub-3:50 1500 m runner.

He repeated his record-setting ways by running the 1000 m in 2:23.6 on the same Paris track 19 October.

In 1931, his early season was relatively pedestrian as the fastest 1500 m race he ran was 3:58.0 by July. But on 2 July, he set his third world record, this time in the 2000 m with a time of 5:21.8.

After defeating Thomas 3:53.6 to 3:55.0 over the 1500 m on 2 August, he raced Purje, whose 2000 m record he had broken, over 3/4 mile on 13 September. In an exciting race which saw Ladoumègue catching Purje at the finish, both runners broke the existing world record with a 3:00.6 performance, Ladoumègue winning by a foot.

For his next feat, he decided to attempt the mile record on the same weekend he broke the 1,500 m record the year before - on the first Sunday in October. Running in Stade Jean Bouin in Paris with six other Frenchmen, Ladoumègue followed 800 m runner René Morel as he clocked 60.8 for 440 yards and 2:04.2 for 880 yards. Morel passed 1000 m in 2:34.6, slowed, and Ladoumègue was alone at the bell lap. Ladoumègue hit the 3/4 mile mark at 3:08.0, 1.3 seconds behind the pace Paavo Nurmi ran when he set his record in the mile in 1923. But Ladoumègue had conserved his strength for the final quarter, a strategy which delivered him the 1,500 m record the year before.

At the 1500 m point in the race, Ladoumègue was at 3:52.4, now 0.6 seconds faster than Nurmi. He finished at 4:09.2, a new world record, the first time 4:10 had been broken.

Ladoumègue was now a national hero and a clear favourite to win gold in the 1500 m at the Los Angeles Olympic Games. But the French Federation, to the disgust of the French public, banned him for life because he had allegedly received payoffs for several of his races. His career thus ended.

In 1955 Ladoumègue published an autobiography, entitled Dans ma foulée. He died in Paris, Île-de-France in 1973.

Records
Preceded by (Germany) Otto Peltzer	Men's 1,500m World Record Holder; 5 October 1930 – 17 September 1933	Succeeded by (Italy) Luigi Beccali
Preceded by (Finland) Paavo Nurmi	Men's Mile World Record Holder; 4 October 1931 – 15 July 1933	Succeeded by (New Zealand) Jack Lovelock
Preceded by (Finland) Eino Purje	Men's 2,000m World Record Holder; 2 July 1931 – 4 October 1936	Succeeded by (Hungary) Miklós Szabó
Preceded by (Germany) Otto Peltzer	European Record Holder Men's 1500m 5 October 1930 - 17 September 1933	Succeeded by (Italy) Luigi Beccali
