= Henry Symonds =

Henry or Harry Symonds may refer to:

- Henry Symonds (barrister) (1859–1933), English barrister and numismatist
- Henry Delahay Symonds (1740–1816), English publisher, bookseller and radical
- Henry Herbert Symonds (1885–1958), English Anglican priest, teacher and conservationist
- Henry Alfred Symonds (1924–1994), English member of the British Free Corps
- Harry Symonds (cricketer) (Henry George Symonds, 1889–1945), Welsh cricketer
- Harry Symonds (footballer) (Henry Stace Symonds, 1880–1963), Australian rules footballer

== See also ==
- Henry Simmons (disambiguation)
- Harry L. Symons (1893–1962), Canadian writer
- Harry Simmons (disambiguation)
