= Henry Simmons (disambiguation) =

Henry Simmons (born 1970) is an American actor

Henry Simmons may also refer to:

- Harry Simmons (high jumper) (1911–1944), British Olympic high jumper
- Henry Alexander Kendall Simmons (born 1979), American football player
- Henry Simmons (cricketer) (1871–1934), Barbadian cricketer

== See also ==
- Harry Simmons (disambiguation)
- Henry Simons (disambiguation)
- Henry Symonds (disambiguation)
