= Athletics at the 1928 Summer Olympics – Men's high jump =

Men's high jump at the Games of the IX Olympiad
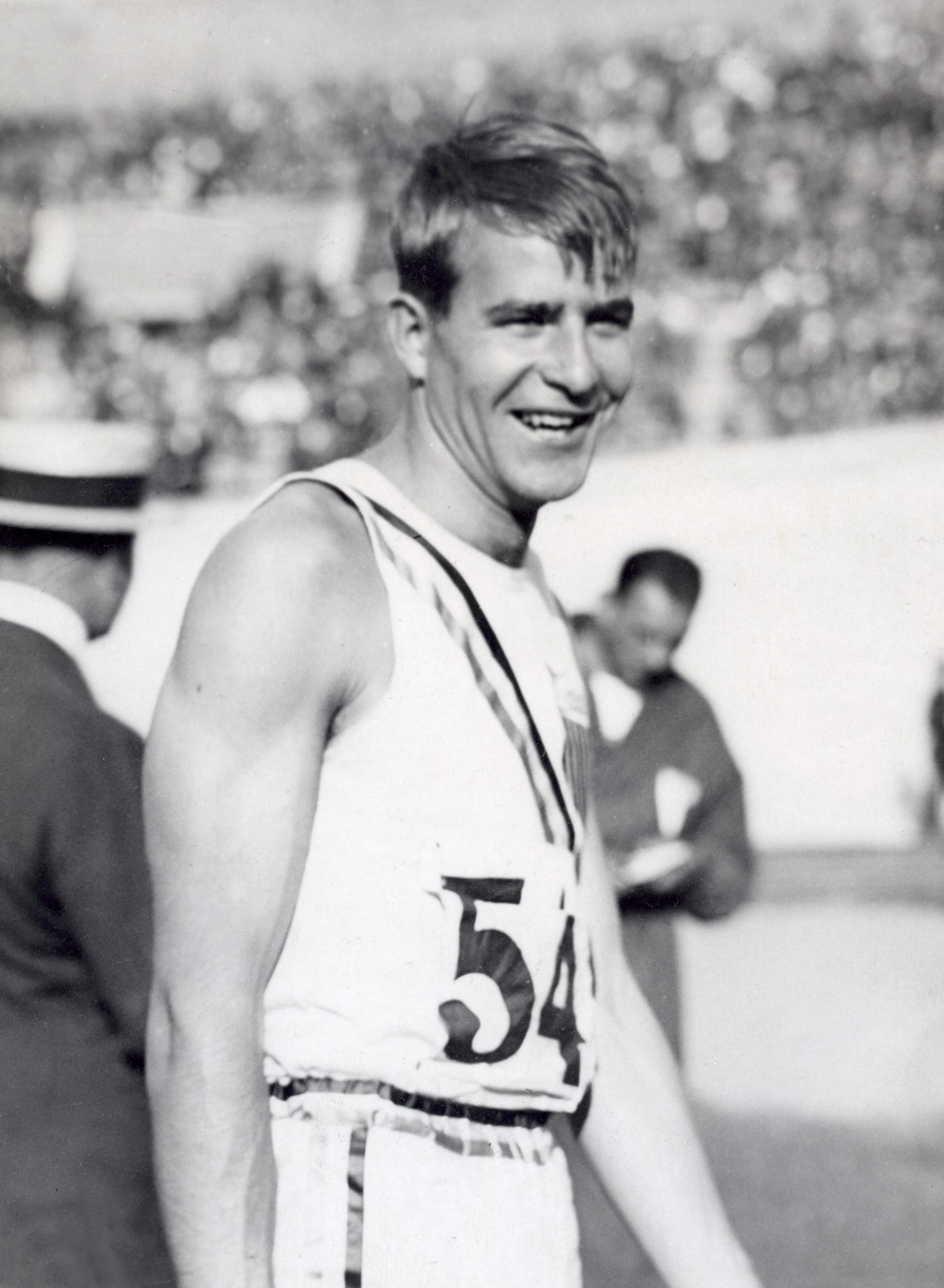
- Bob King
- Venue: Olympic Stadium
- Date: July 29, 1928
- Competitors: 35 from 17 nations
- Winning height: 1.94

Medalists
1st place, gold medalist(s)		Bob King; United States
2nd place, silver medalist(s)		Benjamin Hedges; United States
3rd place, bronze medalist(s)		Claude Ménard; France

Official Video Highlights

The men's high jump event at the 1928 Olympic Games took place July 29. Thirty-five athletes from 17 nations competed. The maximum number of athletes per nation was 4. Bob King won the final with a jump of 1.94 metres. Four other competitors cleared 1.91 metres, and their placement was decided via a jump-off. King's victory was the United States' eighth consecutive victory in the men's high jump; Benjamin Hedges's silver made it the third straight Games in which Americans went 1–2. Claude Ménard earned France's second consecutive bronze medal in the event.

== Background ==
This was the eighth appearance of the event, which is one of 12 athletics events to have been held at every Summer Olympics. The returning finalists from the 1924 Games were gold medalist Harold Osborn of the United States and bronze medalist (and 1920 finalist) Pierre Lewden of France. While Osborn was defending champion and world record holder, his countryman Bob King was undefeated in 1928.

Argentina, Lithuania, the Philippines, Romania, and Turkey each made their debut in the event. The United States appeared for the eighth time, having competed at each edition of the Olympic men's high jump to that point.

== Competition format ==
The competition used the two-round format introduced in 1912. There were two distinct rounds of jumping with results cleared between rounds. The qualifying round had the bar set at 1.60 metres, 1.70 metres, 1.77 metres, and 1.83 metres. All jumpers clearing 1.83 metres in the qualifying round advanced to the final. In the final, the bar was set at 1.70 metres, 1.80 metres, 1.84 metres, 1.88 metres, and then increased by .03 metres at a time. There were jump-offs in the final to resolve ties through sixth place.

== Records ==
These were the standing world and Olympic records (in metres) prior to the 1928 Summer Olympics.

World record	Harold Osborn (USA)	2.03	Urbana, United States	27 May 1924
Olympic record	Harold Osborn (USA)	1.98	Paris, France	7 July 1924

No new world or Olympic records were set during the competition.

== Schedule ==
Date	Time	Round
Sunday, 29 July 1928	16:00	Qualifying; Final

== Results ==
Key

- o = Height cleared
- x = Height failed
- – = Height passed
- r = Retired
- SB = Season's best
- PB = Personal best
- NR = National record
- AR = Area record
- OR = Olympic record
- WR = World record
- WL = World lead
- NM = No mark
- DNS = Did not start
- DQ = Disqualified

=== Qualifying ===
All jumpers clearing 1.83 meters advanced to the final round. Jump sequences are not known.

Rank	Athlete	Nation	1.60	1.70	1.77	1.83	Height	Notes
1	Herbert Adolfsson	Sweden	o	o	o	o	1.83	Q
1	Wolf Boneder	Germany	o	o	o	o	1.83	Q
1	André Cherrier	France	o	o	o	o	1.83	Q
1	Colin Gordon	Great Britain	o	o	o	o	1.83	Q
1	Benjamin Hedges	United States	o	o	o	o	1.83	Q
1	Fritz Huhn	Germany	o	o	o	o	1.83	Q
1	Kornél Késmárki	Hungary	o	o	o	o	1.83	Q
1	Kazuo Kimura	Japan	o	o	o	o	1.83	Q
1	Bob King	United States	o	o	o	o	1.83	Q
1	Fritz Köpke	Germany	o	o	o	o	1.83	Q
1	Pierre Lewden	France	o	o	o	o	1.83	Q
1	Charles McGinnis	United States	o	o	o	o	1.83	Q
1	Claude Ménard	France	o	o	o	o	1.83	Q
1	Mikio Oda	Japan	o	o	o	o	1.83	Q
1	Harold Osborn	United States	o	o	o	o	1.83	Q
1	Harry Simmons	Great Britain	o	o	o	o	1.83	Q
1	Einar Tommelstad	Norway	o	o	o	o	1.83	Q
1	Simeon Toribio	Philippines	o	o	o	o	1.83	Q
19	Carl van Geyzel	Great Britain	o	o	o	x	1.77	
19	Antonios Karyofyllis	Greece	o	o	o	x	1.77	
19	Ioannis Karyofyllis	Greece	o	o	o	x	1.77	
19	Oscar Midtlyng	Norway	o	o	o	x	1.77	
19	Ferenc Orbán	Hungary	o	o	o	x	1.77	
19	Henri Thesingh	Netherlands	o	o	o	x	1.77	
19	Geoffrey Turner	Great Britain	o	o	o	x	1.77	
19	Valerio Vallania	Argentina	o	o	o	x	1.77	
19	Paavo Yrjölä	Finland	o	o	o	x	1.77	
28	Haydar Aşan	Turkey	o	o	x	—	1.70	
28	Frits Bührman	Netherlands	o	o	x	—	1.70	
28	Joop Kamstra	Netherlands	o	o	x	—	1.70	
28	Tiberiu Rusu	Romania	o	o	x	—	1.70	
28	Otto Schöpp	Romania	o	o	x	—	1.70	
33	Adolfas Akelaitis	Lithuania	o	x	—		1.60	
—	Alex Munroe	Canada	o	o	o	x	DSQ	
—	Armas Wahlstedt	Finland	—	—	—	x	No mark	

=== Final ===
Jump sequences are not known. Jump-offs were conducted for 2nd through 5th place and for 6th place.

Rank	Athlete	Nation	1.70	1.80	1.84	1.88	1.91	1.94	Height
1st place, gold medalist(s)	Bob King	United States	o	o	o	o	o	o	1.94
2nd place, silver medalist(s)	Benjamin Hedges	United States	o	o	o	o	o	x	1.91
3rd place, bronze medalist(s)	Claude Ménard	France	o	o	o	o	o	x	1.91
4	Simeon Toribio	Philippines	o	o	o	o	o	x	1.91
5	Harold Osborn	United States	o	o	o	o	o	x	1.91
6	Kazuo Kimura	Japan	o	o	o	o	x	—	1.88
7	André Cherrier	France	o	o	o	o	x	—	1.88
7	Pierre Lewden	France	o	o	o	o	x	—	1.88
7	Charles McGinnis	United States	o	o	o	o	x	—	1.88
7	Mikio Oda	Japan	o	o	o	o	x	—	1.88
11	Herbert Adolfsson	Sweden	o	o	o	x	—		1.84
11	Kornél Késmárki	Hungary	o	o	o	x	—		1.84
11	Fritz Köpke	Germany	o	o	o	x	—		1.84
11	Harry Simmons	Great Britain	o	o	o	x	—		1.84
11	Einar Tommelstad	Norway	o	o	o	x	—		1.84
16	Wolf Boneder	Germany	o	o	x	—			1.80
17	Colin Gordon	Great Britain	o	x	—				1.70
17	Fritz Huhn	Germany	o	x	—				1.70
