= Men's 800 metres European record progression =

The following table shows the European record progression in the men's 800 metres, as ratified by the EAA

== Hand timing ==
Time	Athlete	Nationality	Venue	Date
1:51.6*	Otto Peltzer	Germany	London, England	July 3, 1926
1:50.6	Sera Martin	France	Paris, France	July 14, 1928
1:49.8	Tommy Hampson	United Kingdom	Los Angeles, United States	August 2, 1932
1:48.4	Sydney Wooderson	United Kingdom	Motspur Park, England	August 20, 1938
1:46.6	Rudolf Harbig	Germany	Milan, Italy	July 17, 1939
1:45.7	Roger Moens	Belgium	Oslo, Norway	August 3, 1955
1:44.9	Franz-Josef Kemper	West Germany	Hanover, Germany	August 7, 1966
1:44.9	Walter Adams	West Germany	Stuttgart, Germany	July 16, 1970
1:44.5	Pekka Vasala	Finland	Helsinki, Finland	August 20, 1972
1:43.7	Marcello Fiasconaro	Italy	Milan, Italy	June 27, 1973

(*) Performance timed over 880 yards

== Automatic timing ==
Time	Athlete	Nationality	Venue	Date
1:42.33	Sebastian Coe	United Kingdom	Oslo, Norway	July 5, 1979
1:41.73	Sebastian Coe	United Kingdom	Florence, Italy	June 10, 1981
1:41.73	Wilson Kipketer	Denmark	Stockholm, Sweden	July 7, 1997
1:41.24	Wilson Kipketer	Denmark	Zürich, Switzerland	August 13, 1997
1:41.11	Wilson Kipketer	Denmark	Cologne, Germany	August 24, 1997
