= Ioannis Karyofyllis =

Ioannis Karyofyllis can refer to:

- Ioannis Karyofyllis (scholar), 17th-century Greek scholar
- Ioannis Karyofyllis (athlete) (born 1908), Greek Olympic athlete
- Ioannis Karyofyllis (sailor) (born 1939), Greek Olympic sailor
