= André Cherrier =

French high jumper

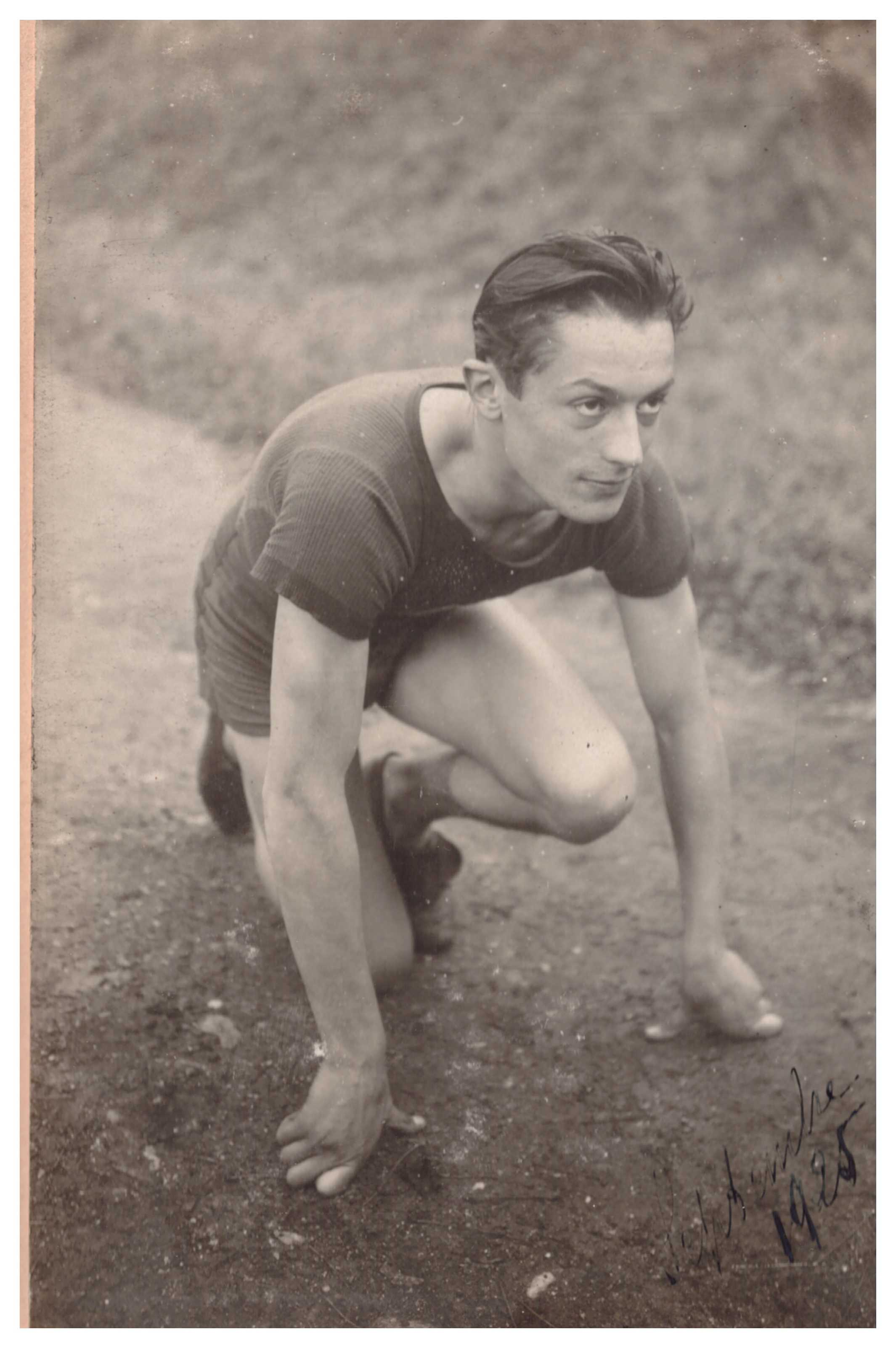

Personal information
- Nationality: French
- Born: 6 January 1905 Paris, France
- Died: 28 July 1979 (aged 74) Bondy, Seine-Saint-Denis, France

Sport
- Sport: Athletics
- Event: High jump
- Club: Stade français, Paris

André Cherrier (6 January 1905 – 28 July 1979) was a French athlete who competed at the 1928 Summer Olympics.

== Career ==
Cherrier finished third behind fellow Frenchman Claude Ménard in the high jump event at the 1928 AAA Championships. Shortly afterwards he represented France at the 1928 Olympic Games in Amsterdam, Netherlands, where he competed in the men's high jump event.
