= Hans Kraus (disambiguation) =

Hans Kraus (1905–1995) was an Austrian rock climber and doctor of sports medicine.

Hans Kraus or Hans Krause may also refer to:

- Hans P. Kraus (1907–1988), Austrian book and manuscript dealer
- Hansi Kraus (born 1952 as "Hans Krause"), German actor

== See also ==
- Hans-Georg Kraus (born 1949), German footballer
- Hans-Helmuth Krause (1905–1944), German Olympic athlete
- Hans-Henrik Krause (1918–2002), Danish actor and film director
