= Stenerud =

Stenerud is a Norwegian surname. Notable people with the surname include:

- Alexander Stenerud (born 1975), Norwegian singer-songwriter
- Harald Stenerud (1897–1976), Norwegian hammer and discus thrower
- Jan Stenerud (born 1942), American football player
