= Stan Ashby =

British middle-distance runner

Stanley Ashby
Personal information
- Nationality: British (English)
- Born: Stanley Trevor Ashby; 31 July 1907 Coventry, Warwickshire, England
- Died: 27 August 1988 (aged 81) Coventry, Warwickshire, England

Sport
- Sport: Middle-distance running
- Event: 1500 metres
- Club: Coventry Godiva Harriers

Stanley Trevor Ashby (31 July 1907 – 27 August 1988) was a British middle-distance runner who competed at the 1928 Summer Olympics.

== Biography ==
Ashby was born on 31 July 1907 in Coventry, Warwickshire, the son of William and Ada Jane Ashby.

At the 1928 Olympic Games, Ashby was one of three British athletes competing in the men's 1500 metres. Although he came third in his heat, a report in the Coventry Evenging Telegraph says "He ran a very good race, gave of his best and was only beaten by two men whose claims to be in the final were overwhelming.".

Ashby finished second behind Cyril Ellis in the 1 mile event at the 1929 AAA Championships.
