= Degland =

Degland is a French surname. Notable people with the surname include:

- Côme-Damien Degland (1787–1856), French physician and zoologist
- Emmanuel Degland (1900–1969), French javelin thrower
