= William Whyte (runner) =

Australian middle-distance runner

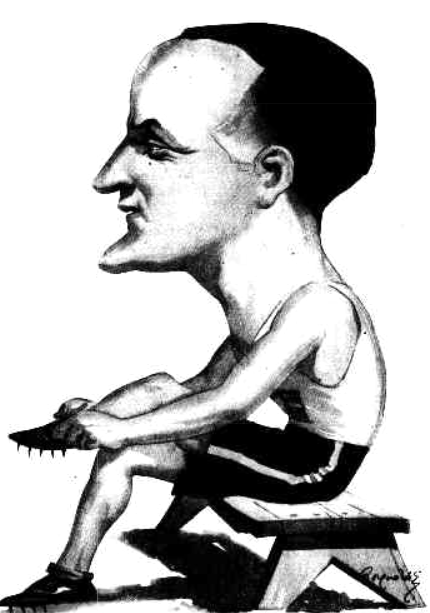
- 1930 caricature by Reynolds

Personal information
- Nationality: Australian
- Born: 16 August 1903 Albert Park, Victoria, Australia
- Died: November 1964 (aged 61)
- Height: 178 cm (5 ft 10 in)
- Weight: 66 kg (146 lb)

Sport
- Sport: Athletics
- Event: middle-distance
- Club: Melbourne Harriers
Medal record
Men's athletics
Representing Australia
British Empire Games
Silver medal – second place	1930 Hamilton	1 mile

William Miller Whyte nicknamed Tickle (16 August 1903 – November 1964) was an Australian athlete who competed in the 1928 Summer Olympics.

== Career ==
Whyte finished third behind Cyril Ellis in the 1 mile event at the British 1928 AAA Championships. Shortly afterwards he represented Australia at the 1928 Olympic Games in Amsterdam, Netherlands, where he finished ninth the 1500 metres event. In the 800 metre competition he was eliminated in the first round.

At the 1930 British Empire Games he won the silver medal in the 1 mile contest. He also participated in the 880 yards event.

He married Alma in November 1927, and they had one daughter, Fay Delores, born in 1928.
