= Auguste Vos =

Belgian shot putter

Personal information
- Nationality: Belgian
- Born: 3 February 1902

Sport
- Sport: Athletics
- Event: Shot put
- Club: RSC Anderlecht

Auguste Vos (born 3 February 1902, date of death unknown) was a Belgian athlete who competed at the 1928 Summer Olympics.

== Biography ==
Vos competed in the men's shot put at the 1928 Summer Olympics.

Vos finished third behind József Daranyi in the shot put event at the 1929 AAA Championships.
