= Ferenc Orbán =

Hungarian high jumper

Personal information
- Nationality: Hungarian
- Born: 6 March 1904 Hódmezővásárhely, Csongrád, Hungary
- Died: 9 July 1989 (aged 85) Los Angeles, California, USA
- Height: 193 cm (6 ft 4 in)
- Weight: 80 kg (176 lb)

Sport
- Sport: Athletics
- Event: High jump
- Club: Kolozsvári Egyetemi AC

Ferenc Orbán (6 March 1904 – 9 July 1989) was a Hungarian athlete who competed at the 1928 Summer Olympics.

== Career ==
Orbán finished third behind Carl Van Geysel in the high jump event at the 1926 AAA Championships.

Orbán competed in the men's high jump at the 1928 Olympic Games.
