= 1928 AAA Championships =

Outdoor track and field competition

- Dates: 6–7 July 1928
- Host city: London, England
- Venue: Stamford Bridge
- Level: Senior
- Type: Outdoor
- Events: 24

The 1928 AAA Championships was the 1928 edition of the annual outdoor track and field competition organised by the Amateur Athletic Association (AAA). It was held from 6 to 7 July 1928 at Stamford Bridge in London, England.

The Championships consisted of 24 events and covered two days of competition. The decathlon was introduced for the first time and the marathon was held from Windsor to Stamford Bridge.

== Results ==
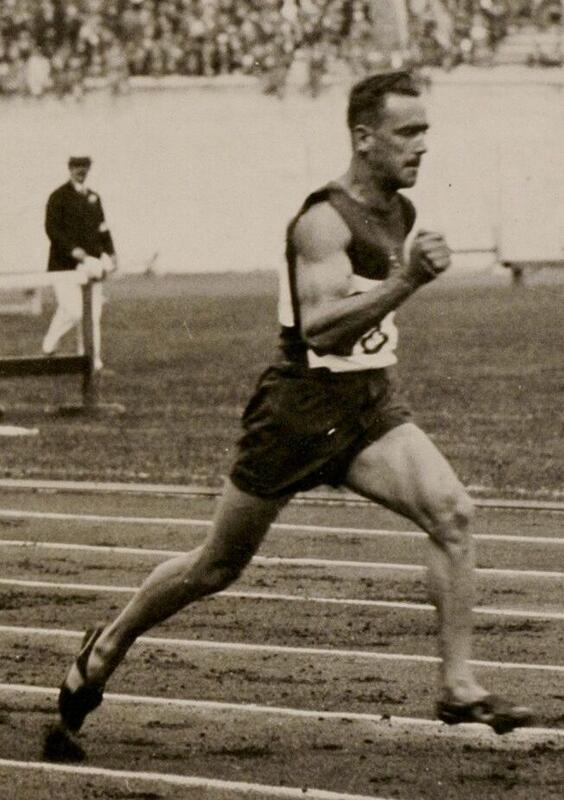
South African Wilfred Legg won the 100 yards

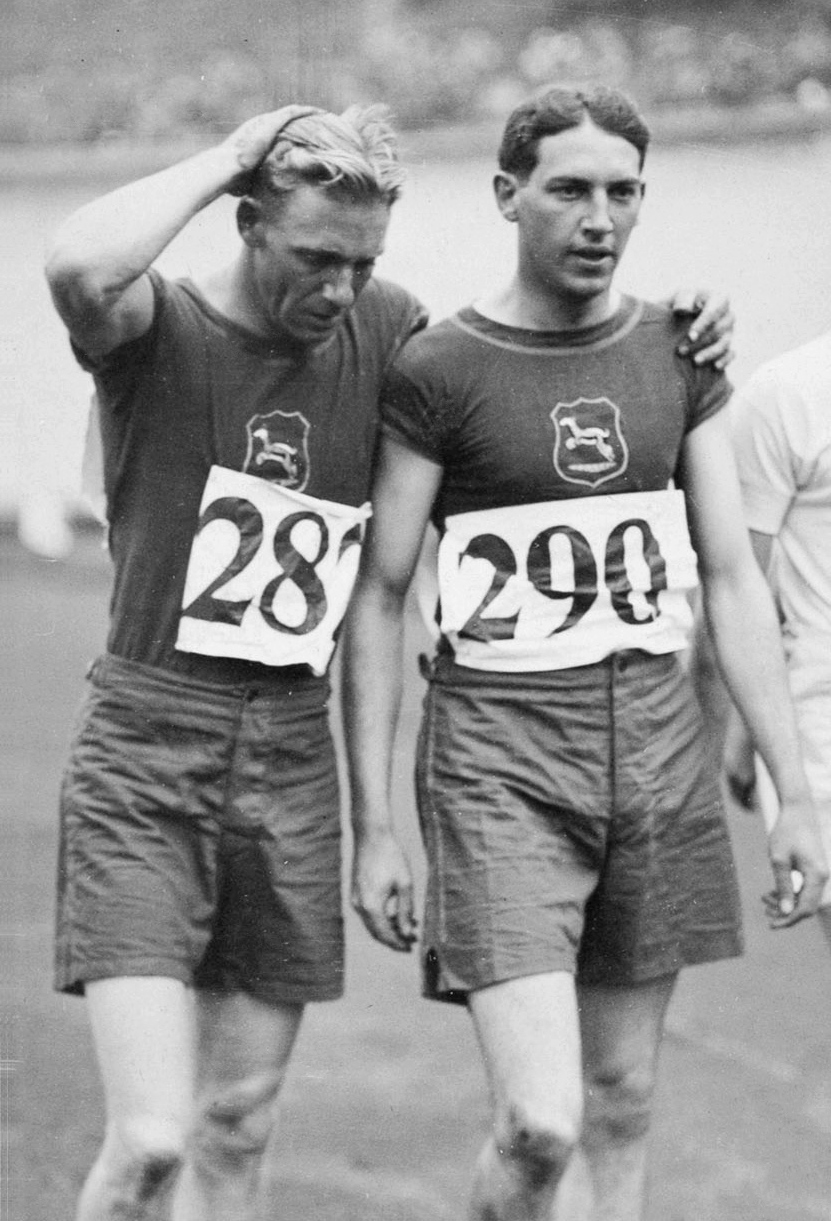
Two more South Africans, Sid Atkinson, winner of the 120 yards hurdles (left) and George Weightman-Smith, second in the javelin (right)

Event	Gold		Silver		Bronze	
100 yards	(South Africa) Wilfred Legg	9.9	(Germany) Helmut Körnig	1 yd	(Germany) Friedrich-Wilhelm Wichmann	inches
220 yards	(Germany) Friedrich-Wilhelm Wichmann	21.7	(Germany) Helmut Körnig	2-4 ft	Walter Rangeley	3 yd
440 yards	Douglas Lowe	50.0	John Rinkel	2 yd	Roger Leigh-Wood	inches
880 yards	Douglas Lowe	1:56.6	(Germany) Hermann Engelhard	1:57.0	Wilfrid Tatham	1:57.6
1 mile	Cyril Ellis	4:20.8	(Wales) Reg Thomas	4:22.4	(Australia) William Whyte	4:22.6
4 miles	Walter Beavers	19:41.6	Arthur Muggridge	19:41.8	Freddie Light	19:54.6
10 miles	Jack Webster	52:16.2	John Beman	52:20.4	Ernest Harper	52:21.4
marathon	Harry Payne	2:34:34.0 NR	(Scotland) Dunky Wright	2:38:09.0	Ernest Harper	2:39:08.0
steeplechase	Jack Webster	10:44.8	Edward Oliver	11:30.0	Vernon Morgan	11:09.0
120y hurdles	(South Africa) Sidney Atkinson	14.7	Frederick Gaby	2 yd	Lord Burghley	
440y hurdles	Lord Burghley	54.0 NR	(Scotland) Thomas Livingstone-Learmonth	55.2	(France) Roger Viel	
2 miles walk	Alf Pope	14:04.8	Cecil Hyde	14:16.2	John Wilson	14:24.6
7 miles walk	Cecil Hyde	55:46.2	Dick Edge	56:12.6	John Wilson	56:35.6
high jump	(France) Claude Ménard	1.905	(Dominion of Ceylon) Carl Van Geysel	1.880	(France) André Cherrier; Harry Simmons	1.854; 1.854
pole jump	(United States) Franklin Kelley	3.83	Fred Housden (United States) Edmund McGill	3.50	n/a	
long jump	(Netherlands) Hannes de Boer	7.21	(Germany) Rudolf Dobermann	7.17	(Australia) Walter Harrison	6.91
triple jump	(Netherlands) Willem Peters	14.91	(Australia) Anthony Winter	14.51	(Netherlands) Jan Blankers	14.32
shot put	(France) Édouard Duhour	14.45	Rex Woods	13.46	(South Africa) Harry Hart	12.93
discus throw	(Germany) Ernst Paulus	44.48	(France) Jules Noel	41.54	Charles Best	35.52
hammer throw	(Republic of Ireland) Bill Britton	46.62	Malcolm Nokes	46.14	(Scotland) John Jackson	37.99
javelin throw	(New Zealand) Stanley Lay	67.90	(South Africa) George Weightman-Smith	61.96	(France) Emmanuel Degland	59.47
decathlon	(South Africa) Harry Hart	6769.825	Howard Ford	5807.79 NR	Donald Hooton	5558.955
440 yards relay	Frankfurter Sportgemeinde Eintracht		Achilles Club		Surrey AC	
Tug of war	London Fire Brigade		Edgware Police			

== See also ==
- 1928 WAAA Championships
