= Gyula Belloni =

Hungarian middle-distance runner

Personal information
- Nationality: Hungarian
- Born: 6 February 1904
- Died: 28 June 1977 (aged 73)

Sport
- Sport: Middle-distance running
- Event: 1500 metres

Gyula Belloni (6 February 1904 – 28 June 1977) was a Hungarian middle-distance runner. He competed in the men's 1500 metres at the 1928 Summer Olympics.
