= Pete Walter =

Personal information
- Nationality: Canadian
- Born: 29 March 1905
- Died: 23 September 1974 (aged 69)

Sport
- Sport: Middle-distance running
- Event: 1500 metres

Pete Walter (29 March 1905 – 23 September 1974) was a Canadian middle-distance runner. He competed in the men's 1500 metres at the 1928 Summer Olympics.
