= Henri Thesingh =

Dutch athletics competitor

Personal information
- Nationality: Dutch
- Born: 4 March 1903
- Died: 8 September 1982 (aged 79)

Sport
- Sport: Athletics
- Event: High jump

Henri Thesingh (4 March 1903 – 8 September 1982) was a Dutch athlete. He competed in the men's high jump at the 1928 Summer Olympics.
