= Friedrich-Wilhelm Wichmann =

German athletics competitor

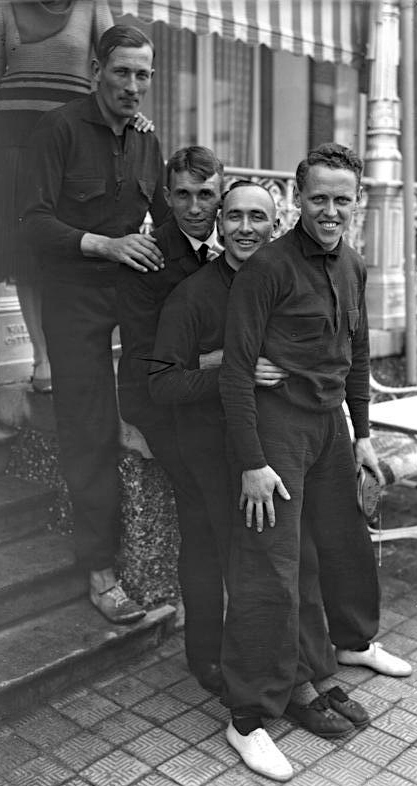
- Wichmann (2nd left) in 1928

Personal information
- Born: 31 August 1901 Hörde, Germany
- Died: 19 November 1974 (aged 73) Korbach, Germany
- Height: 186 cm (6 ft 1 in)
- Weight: 75 kg (165 lb)

Sport
- Sport: Athletics
- Event: Sprint

Achievements and titles
- Personal bests: 100 m – 10.5 (1927); 200 m – 21.2 (1929)

Friedrich-Wilhelm Otto Wichmann (31 August 1901 – 19 November 1974) was a German sprinter who competed at the 1928 Summer Olympics.

== Career ==
Wichmann was part of the German 4 × 100 m relay teams that set four world records in 1928.

Wichmann won the British AAA Championships title in the 220 yards event and third second behind Wilfred Legg in the 100 yards at the 1928 AAA Championships.

Shortly afterwards he represented Germany at the 1928 Olympic Games in Amsterdam, Netherlands, where he competed in the 100 metres event at the 1928 Summer Olympics, but his result is unknown.
