= Fritz Köpke =

German high jumper

Personal information
- Nationality: German
- Born: 21 January 1902 Plathe an der Rega, German Empire
- Died: 18 November 1991 (aged 89) Speyer, Germany

Sport
- Sport: Athletics
- Event: High jump

Fritz Köpke (21 January 1902 – 18 November 1991) was a German athlete. He competed in the men's high jump at the 1928 Summer Olympics.
