= Herbert Adolfsson =

Swedish high jumper

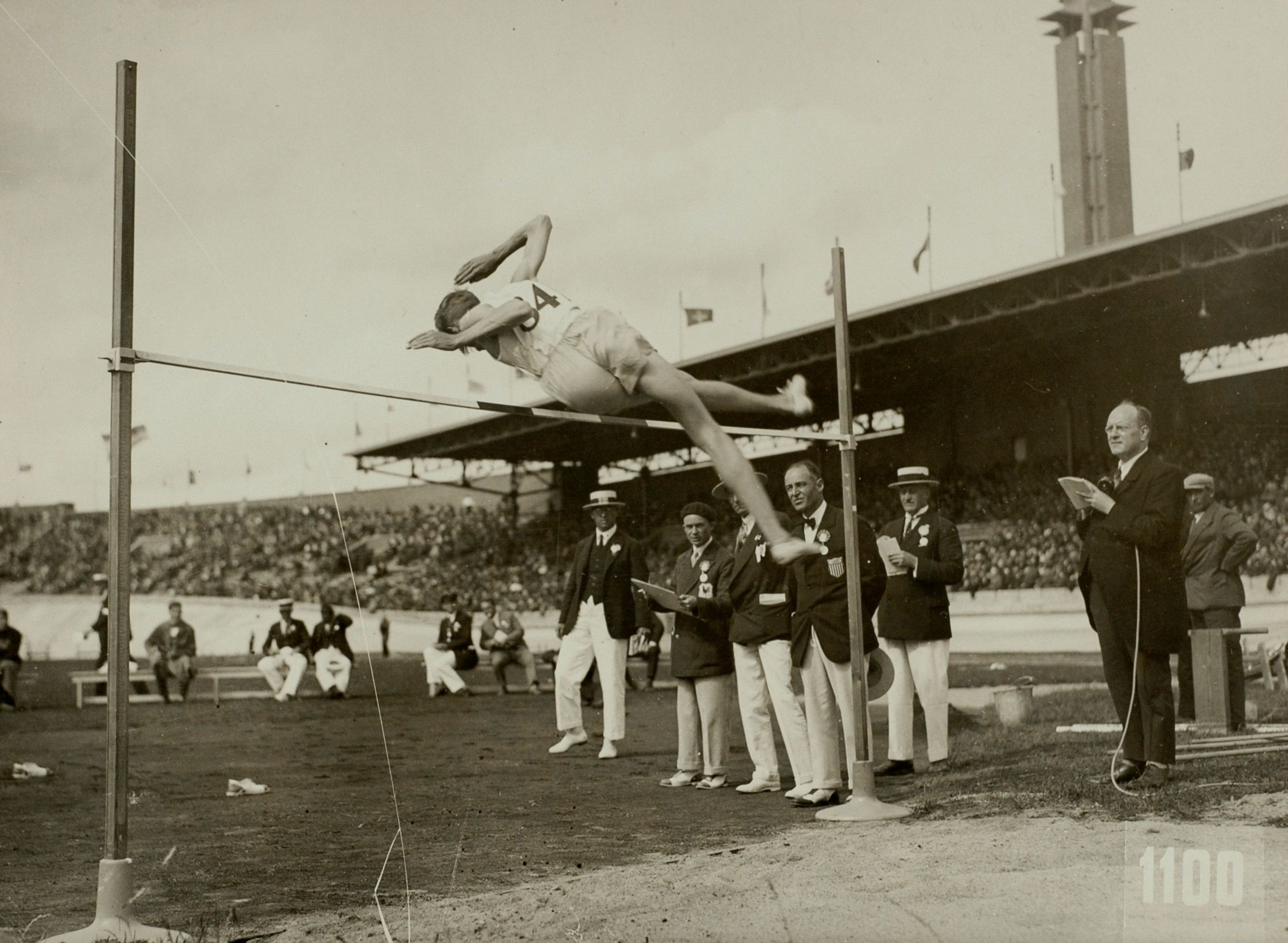
- Herbert Adolfsson in 1928

Personal information
- Full name: Karl Tage Herbert Adolfsson
- Nationality: Swedish
- Born: 16 July 1906 Vena, Sweden
- Died: 7 November 1979 (aged 73) Hultsfred, Sweden
- Height: 82 cm (2 ft 8 in)
- Weight: 72 kg (159 lb)

Sport
- Sport: Athletics
- Event: High jump
- Club: Eksjö GIK

Karl Tage Herbert Adolfsson (16 July 1906 – 7 November 1979) was a Swedish athlete. He competed in the men's high jump at the 1928 Summer Olympics.

Adolfsson won the British AAA Championships title in the high jump event at the 1927 AAA Championships.
