= Carl van Geyzel =

British athlete

Personal information
- Nationality: British / Sri Lankan
- Born: 19 December 1902 Colombo, Ceylon
- Died: 18 January 1971 (aged 68) Lunuwila, Sri Lanka

Sport
- Sport: Athletics
- Event: High jump
- Club: University of Cambridge AC; Achilles Club

Carl Theodore van Geyzel (19 December 1902 – 18 January 1971) was a British and Sri Lankan athlete and cricketer who competed at the 1928 Summer Olympics.

== Career ==
Van Geyzel was educated at in Colombo and later Trinity Hall, Cambridge.

Van Geyzel became the national high jump champion after winning the British AAA Championships title at the 1927 AAA Championships.

The following year in 1928 he finished second behind Claude Ménard in the high jump event at the 1928 AAA Championships. Shortly afterwards he represented Great Britain at the 1928 Olympic Games in Amsterdam, Netherlands, where he competed in the men's high jump at the 1928 Olympics Games.

His Ceylon national record in the high jump stood for more than 25 years.

He also played in two first-class cricket matches in the 1920s, including one for Cambridge University Cricket Club.

== See also ==
- List of Cambridge University Cricket Club players
