= Frits Bührman =

Dutch high jumper

Personal information
- Nationality: Dutch
- Born: 27 August 1904
- Died: 5 February 1930 (aged 25)

Sport
- Sport: Athletics
- Event: High jump

Frits Bührman (27 August 1904 – 5 February 1930) was a Dutch athlete. He competed in the men's high jump at the 1928 Summer Olympics.
