= Fritz Huhn =

German high jumper

Personal information
- Nationality: German
- Born: 26 September 1900
- Died: 10 June 1990 (aged 89)

Sport
- Sport: Athletics
- Event: High jump

Fritz Huhn (26 September 1900 – 10 June 1990) was a German athlete. He competed in the men's high jump at the 1928 Summer Olympics.
