= Luka Predanić =

Yugoslav middle-distance runner

Personal information
- Nationality: Yugoslav
- Born: 11 September 1905
- Died: 8 July 1996 (aged 90)

Sport
- Sport: Middle-distance running
- Event: 1500 metres

Luka Predanić (11 September 1905 – 8 July 1996) was a Yugoslav middle-distance runner. He competed in the men's 1500 metres at the 1928 Summer Olympics.
