= Henry Simons =

Henry Simons may refer to:

- Henry Calvert Simons (1899–1946), American economist
- Henry Simons (footballer) (1887–1956), English footballer

== See also ==
- Henry Simmons (disambiguation)
