= Joop Kamstra =

Dutch high jumper

Personal information
- Nationality: Dutch
- Born: 10 October 1905
- Died: 24 April 1957 (aged 51)

Sport
- Sport: Athletics
- Event: High jump

Joop Kamstra (10 October 1905 – 24 April 1957) was a Dutch athlete. He competed in the men's high jump at the 1928 Summer Olympics.
