= Oscar Midtlyng =

Norwegian high jumper

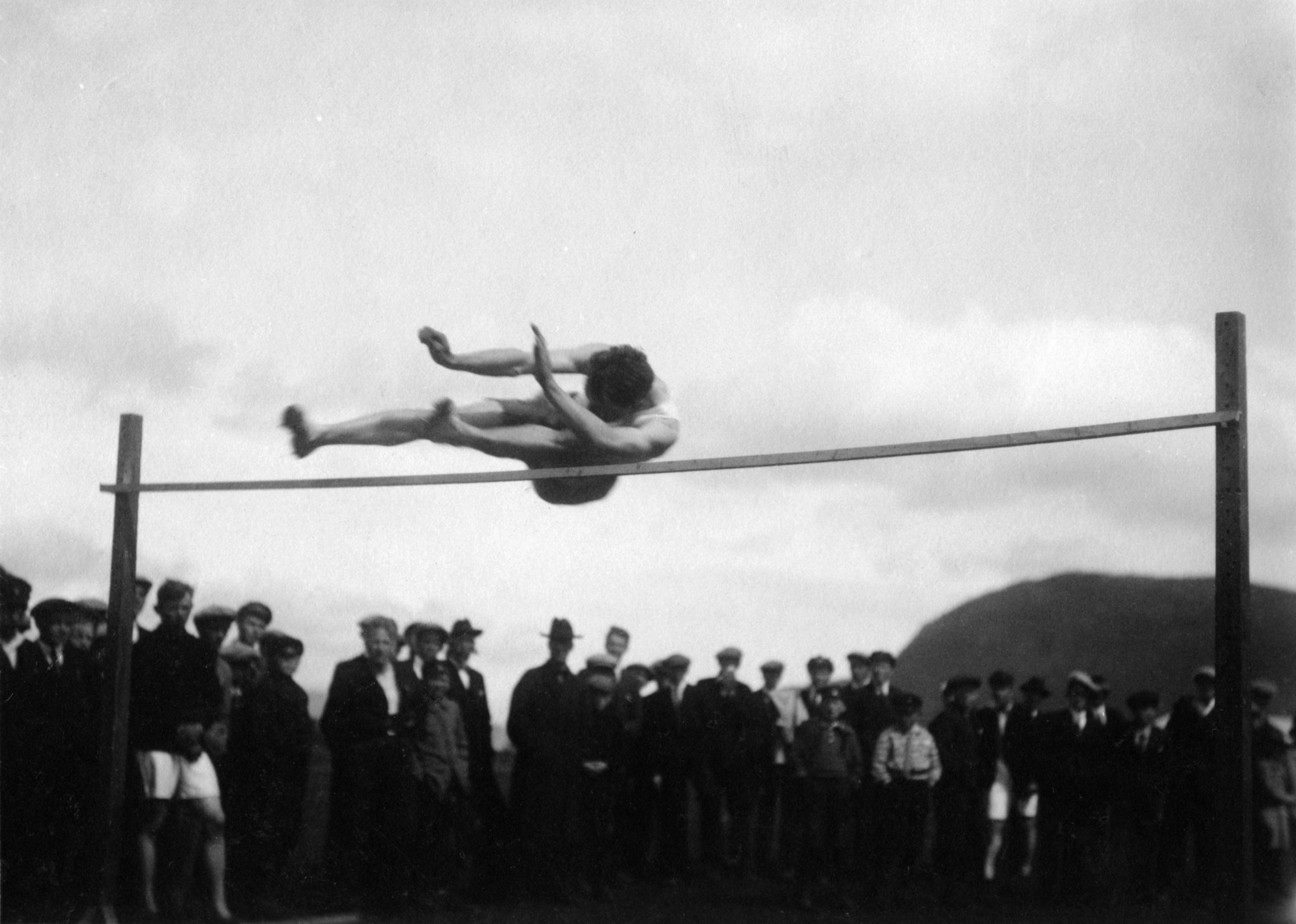

Personal information
- Nationality: Norwegian
- Born: 31 August 1906
- Died: 29 October 1994 (aged 88)

Sport
- Sport: Athletics
- Event: High jump

Oscar Midtlyng (31 August 1906 – 29 October 1994) was a Norwegian athlete. He competed in the men's high jump at the 1928 Summer Olympics.
