= József Marton =

Hungarian middle-distance runner (1907–1974)

Personal information
- Nationality: Hungarian
- Born: 19 March 1907
- Died: 26 December 1974 (aged 67)

Sport
- Sport: Middle-distance running
- Event: 1500 metres

József Marton (19 March 1907 – 26 December 1974) was a Hungarian middle-distance runner. He competed in the men's 1500 metres at the 1928 Summer Olympics.
