= Tommy Hampson =

English athlete (1907-1965)

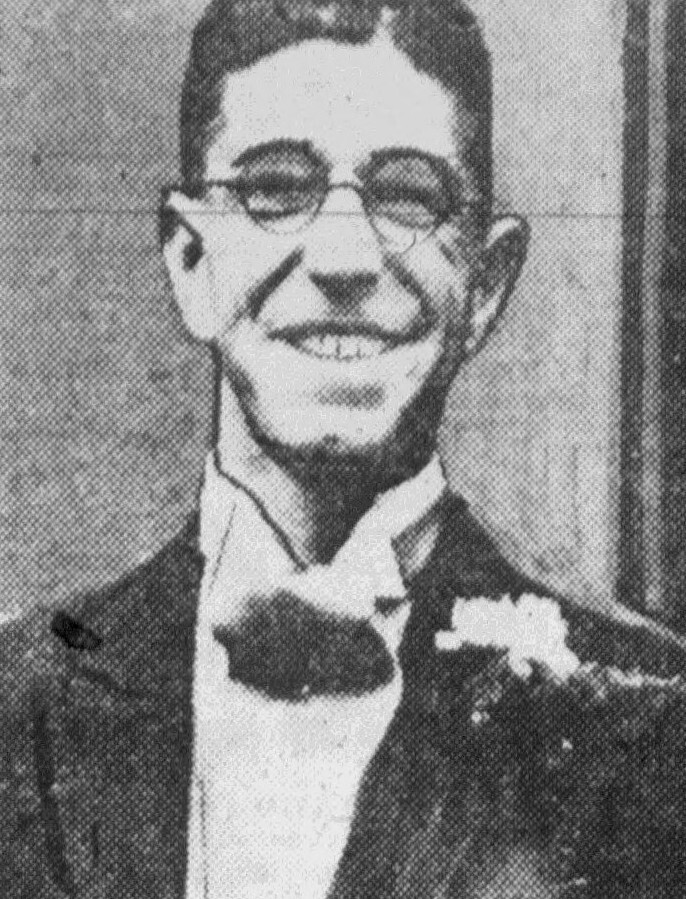
- Hampson in 1933

Personal information
- Nationality: British (English)
- Born: Thomas Hampson; 28 October 1907
- Died: 4 September 1965 (aged 57) Stevenage, Hertfordshire, England
- Resting place: St Mary's Church, Stevenage
- Monuments: Hampson Park, Stevenage
- Spouse: Edith Winnie Hampson

Sport
- Sport: Athletics
- Event: 400m/800m
- Club: University of Oxford AC; Achilles Club
Medal record
Men's athletics
Representing Great Britain
Olympics
Gold medal – first place	1932 Los Angeles	800 metres
Silver medal – second place	1932 Los Angeles	4 × 400 m relay
British Empire Games
Gold medal – first place	1930 Hamilton	880 yards

Thomas Hampson (28 October 1907 – 4 September 1965) was an English athlete, winner of the 800 metres at the 1932 Summer Olympics and the first man to run 800 metres in under 1 minute 50 seconds.

== Biography ==
Hampson, a native of Clapham (London), didn't take up running seriously until the last year of his studies at Oxford University. After completing his education, he became a teacher in 1930 (at St Albans School). That same year, he became the national 880 yards champion after winning the British AAA Championships title at the 1930 AAA Championships.

Also a winner at the inaugural British Empire Games, he retained his title at the 1931 AAA Championships.

Hampson was one of the world's leading runners in the 800 metres and half-mile event and won the 880 yards title again at the 1932 AAA Championships, as well as finishing second behind Crew Stoneley in the 440 yards.

Shortly afterwards he was selected to represent Great Britain at the 1932 Olympic Games in Los Angeles and was one of the favourites for the 800 metre gold. In the final, Hampson fought off Canadian Alex Wilson to break the tape in 1.49.7, a new world record.

He added a second Olympic medal with the British 4 × 400 metres relay team, which came second to the United States. Hampson ended his sports career later that year. Several years later, he left his teaching job to become an educator in the Royal Air Force, a job he kept until after World War II.

In 1954, Hampson moved to Stevenage, Hertfordshire, and joined the Stevenage Development Corporation as Social Relations Officer. He was a warden at the church of St Mary in the town, and after he died at the age of 57, he was buried there. Hampson Park in the town was later named after him.

Records
Preceded by (France) Sera Martin	Men's 800 metres World Record Holder equalled by Ben Eastman (USA) on 1934-06-16; 1932-08-02 – 1936-08-20	Succeeded by (United States) Glenn Cunningham
Preceded by (France) Sera Martin	European Record Holder Men's 800m 2 August 1932 – 19 August 1938	Succeeded by (United Kingdom) Sydney Wooderson
