= Hans Wichmann =

German middle-distance runner

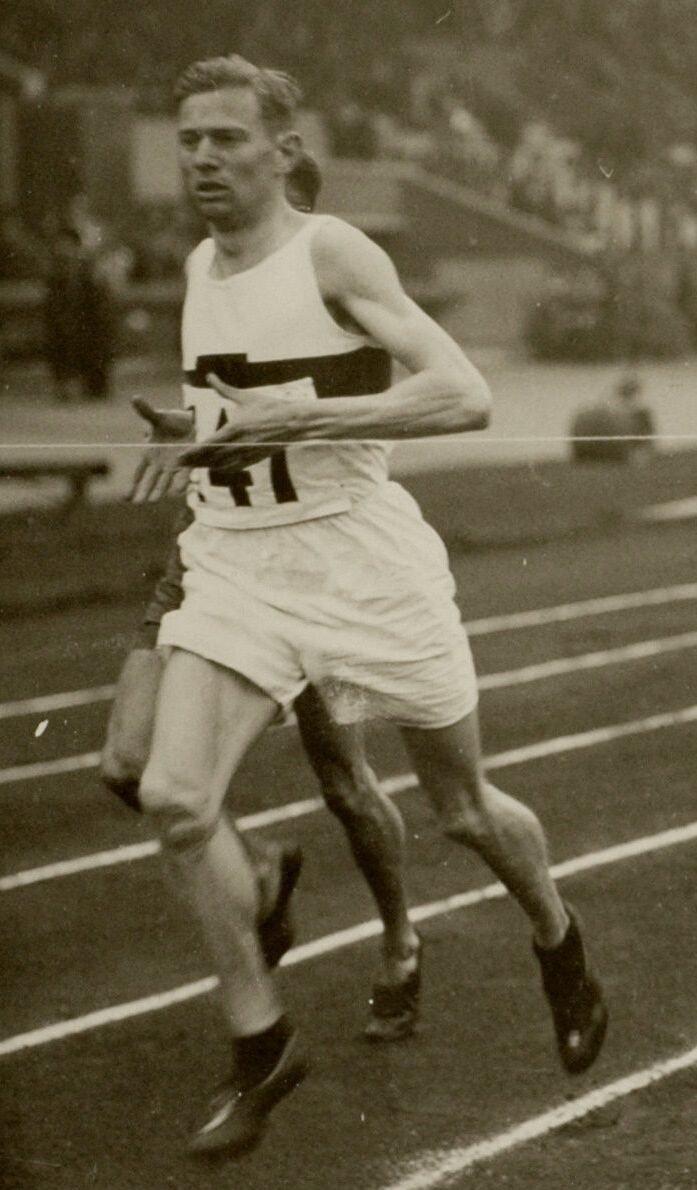
- Hans Wichmann in 1928

Personal information
- Nationality: German
- Born: 28 January 1905
- Died: 23 September 1981 (aged 76)

Sport
- Sport: Middle-distance running
- Event: 1500 metres

Hans Wichmann (28 January 1905 – 23 September 1981) was a German middle-distance runner. He competed in the men's 1500 metres at the 1928 Summer Olympics.
