= Einar Tommelstad =

Norwegian high jumper

Personal information
- Nationality: Norwegian
- Born: 19 January 1909 Oslo, Norway
- Died: 7 November 1983 (aged 74) Oslo, Norway
- Height: 190 cm (6 ft 3 in)
- Weight: 85 kg (187 lb)

Sport
- Sport: Athletics
- Event: high jump
- Club: Oslo IL

Einar Tommelstad (19 January 1909 – 7 November 1983) was a Norwegian high jumper who competed at the Olympic Games. He represented Oslo IL.

== Biography ==
At the 1928 Summer Olympics he finished eleventh in the high jump final with a jump of 1.84 metres. He became Norwegian high jump champion in 1928, and also won the Norwegian championships in pentathlon in 1930.

His personal best jump was 1.92 metres, achieved in July 1928 on Bislett stadion.

Tommelstad finished second behind Kornél Késmárki in the high jump event at the British 1929 AAA Championships.
