= Frédéric du Hen =

Dutch middle-distance runner

Personal information
- Nationality: Dutch
- Born: 27 May 1903 Dordrecht, Netherlands
- Died: 8 April 1992 (aged 88) Dordrecht, Netherlands

Sport
- Sport: Middle-distance running
- Event: 1500 metres

Frédéric Charles du Hen (27 May 1903 – 8 April 1992) was a Dutch middle-distance runner. He competed in the men's 1500 metres at the 1928 Summer Olympics.
