= Czesław Foryś =

Polish middle-distance runner

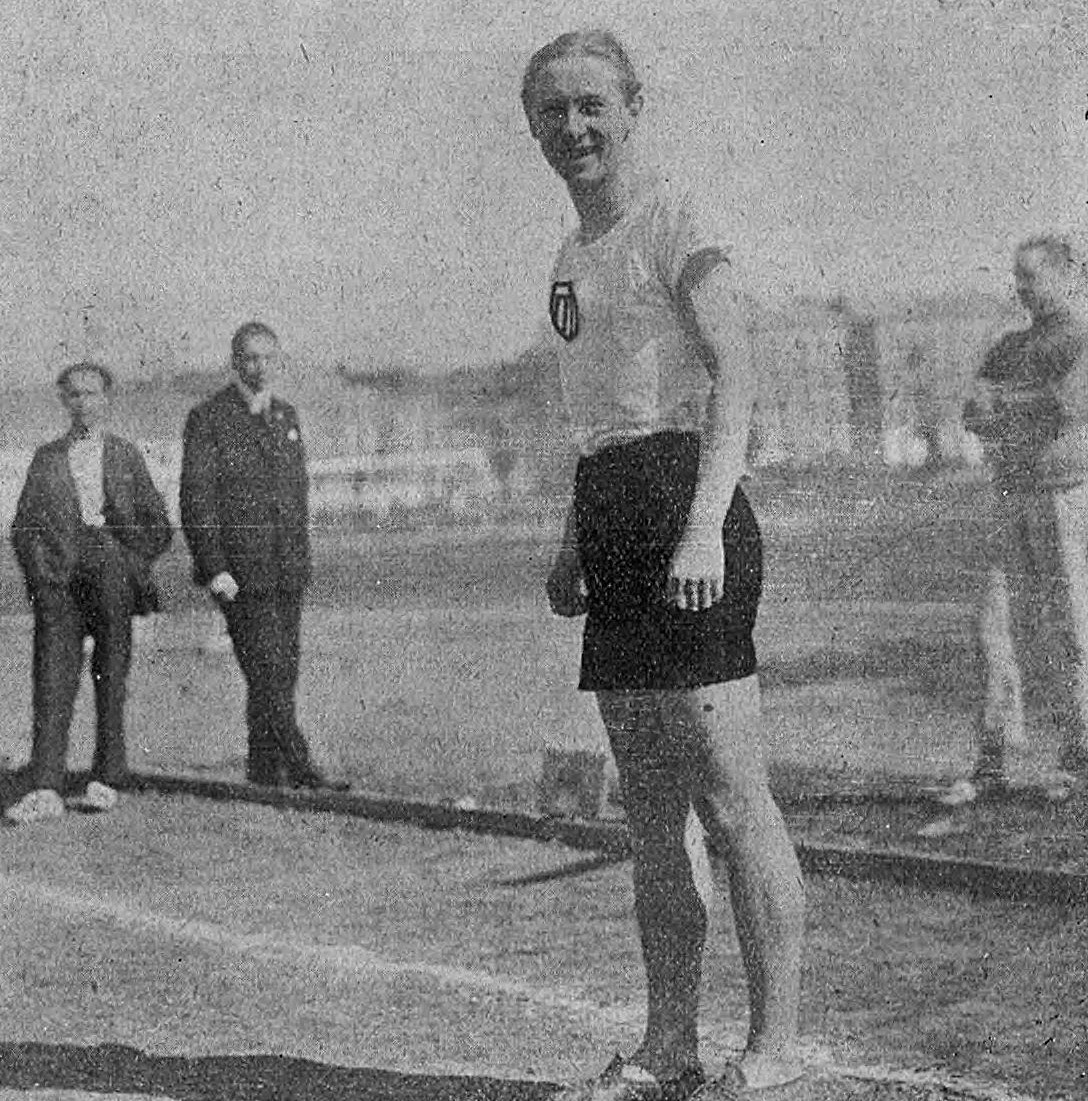
- Foryś in 1925

Personal information
- Nationality: Polish
- Born: 10 May 1905 Bochnia, Austria-Hungary
- Died: 24 February 1966 (aged 60) Warsaw, Poland

Sport
- Sport: Middle-distance running
- Event: 1500 metres

Czesław Foryś (10 May 1905 – 24 February 1966) was a Polish middle-distance runner. He competed in the men's 1500 metres at the 1928 Summer Olympics. He was a law graduate from the University of Warsaw.
