= Wolf Boneder =

German high jumper

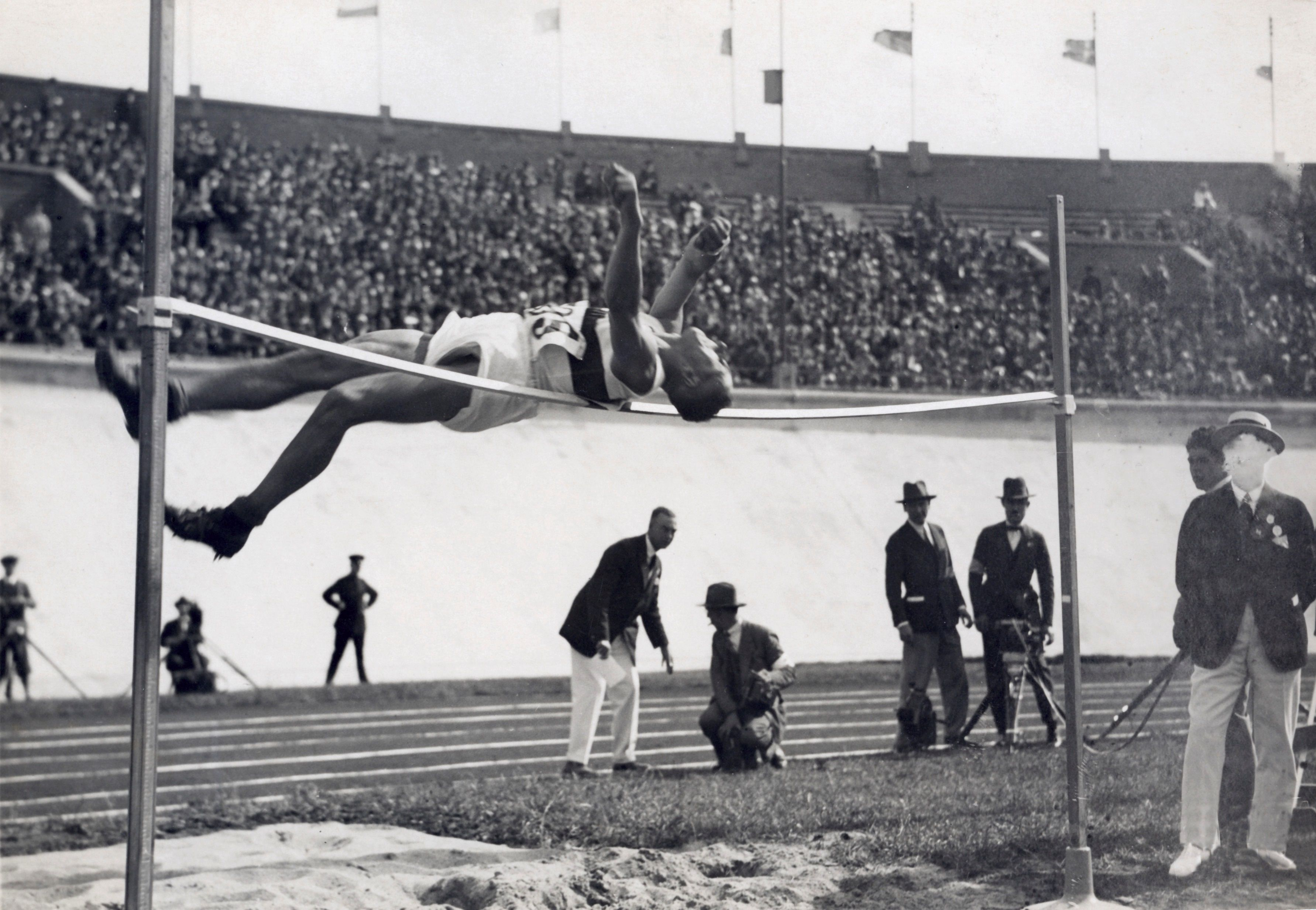
- Wolf Boneder (1928)

Personal information
- Nationality: German
- Born: 20 October 1894
- Died: 13 September 1977 (aged 82)

Sport
- Sport: Athletics
- Event: High jump

Wolf Boneder (20 October 1894 – 13 September 1977) was a German athlete. He competed in the men's high jump at the 1928 Summer Olympics.
