= William Simmons (athlete) =

Personal information
- Nationality: British (English)
- Born: 1903

Sport
- Sport: Athletics
- Event: Sprints
- Club: Polytechnic Harriers

William John Simmons (1903-date of death unknown) was an English athlete.

== Biography ==
Simmons finished second behind Jack London in the 100 yards event at the 1929 AAA Championships.

Simmons competed in the 220 yards at the 1930 British Empire Games for England. He was a salesman at the time of the 1930 Empire Games and lived in St Peter Street, London.
