= Bob King (high jumper) =

American athlete and obstetrician (1906–1965)

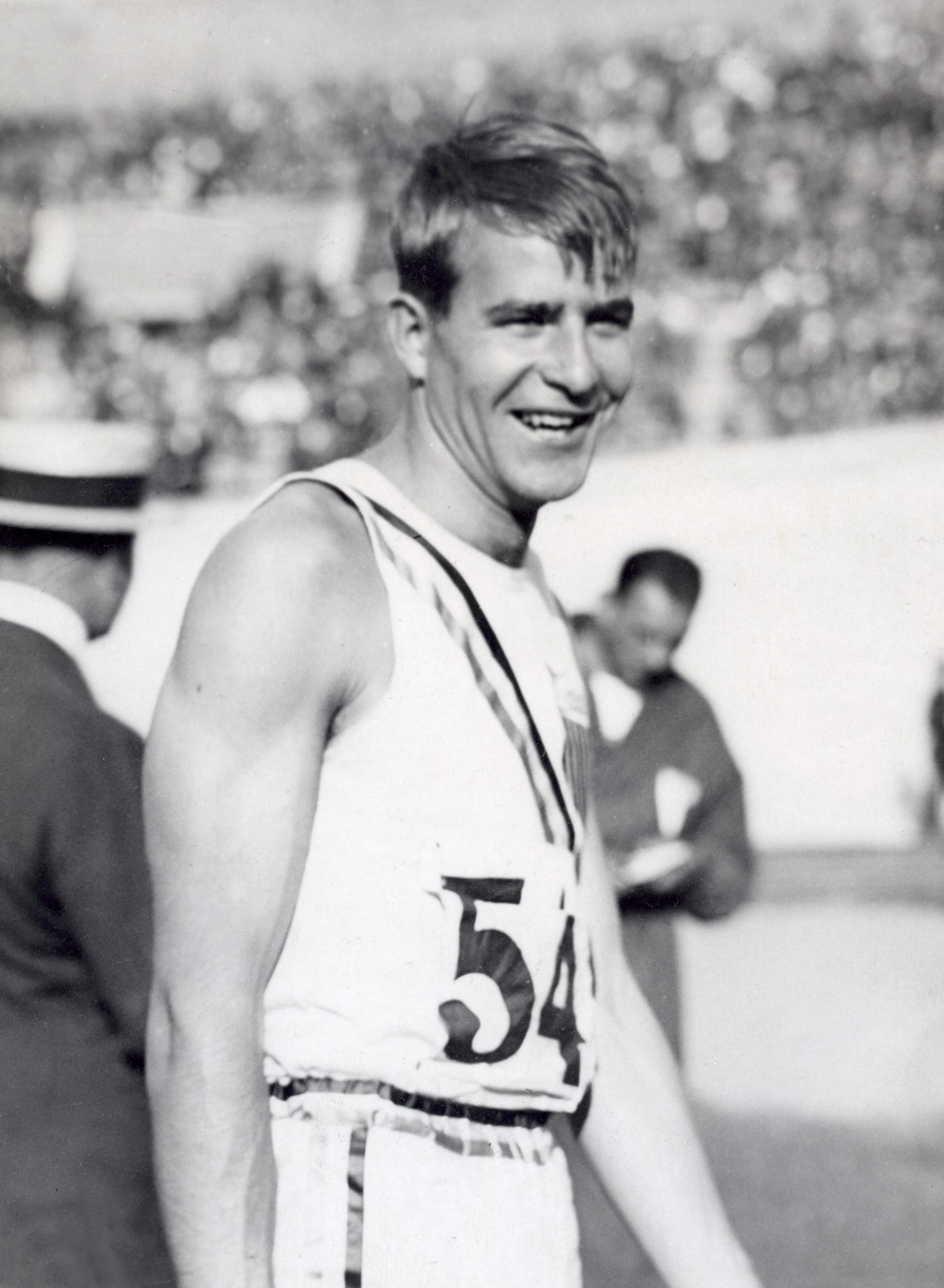
- King at the 1928 Summer Olympics

Personal information
- Full name: Robert Wade King
- Born: June 20, 1906 Los Angeles, California, Un.S.
- Died: July 29, 1965 (aged 59) Walnut Creek, California, U.S.
- Height: 6 ft 3 in (1.90 m)
- Weight: 174 lb (79 kg)

Sport
- Country: United States
- Sport: Athletics
- Event: High jump
- Club: Stanford Cardinal
Medal record
Men's athletics
Representing the United States
Olympic Games
Gold medal – first place	1928 Amsterdam	High jump

Robert Wade King (June 20, 1906 – July 29, 1965) was an American athlete, who won a gold medal in the high jump at the 1928 Summer Olympics with a jump of 1.93 m. His personal best was 1.997 m, achieved earlier that year. After graduating from Stanford University, King studied in a medical school and later became a prominent obstetrician.
