= Leo Helgas =

Finnish middle-distance runner

Personal information
- Nationality: Finnish
- Born: 18 September 1902
- Died: 13 November 1996 (aged 94)

Sport
- Sport: Middle-distance running
- Event: 1500 metres

Leo Helgas (18 September 1902 – 13 November 1996) was a Finnish middle-distance runner. He competed in the men's 1500 metres at the 1928 Summer Olympics.
