= Harry Simmons =

Harry Simmons may refer to:

- Harry Simmons (baseball) (1907–1998), American baseball executive, writer and historian; inductee of the Canadian Baseball Hall of Fame
- Harry Simmons (high jumper) (1911–1944), English high jumper
- Harry Simmons (rugby union) (born 1997), English rugby union player
- Harry Simmons (American football) (died 1990), American football and college basketball coach

== See also ==
- Al Simmons (Aloysius Harry Simmons; 1902–1956), American professional baseball player; inductee of the National Baseball Hall of Fame
- Harold Simmons (1931–2013), American businessman, investor, and philanthropist
- Harold Simmons (folklorist) (1914–1966), Saint Lucian folklorist, artist, historian, and social worker
- Henry Simmons (disambiguation), several people
