= Otto Peltzer =

German middle-distance runner

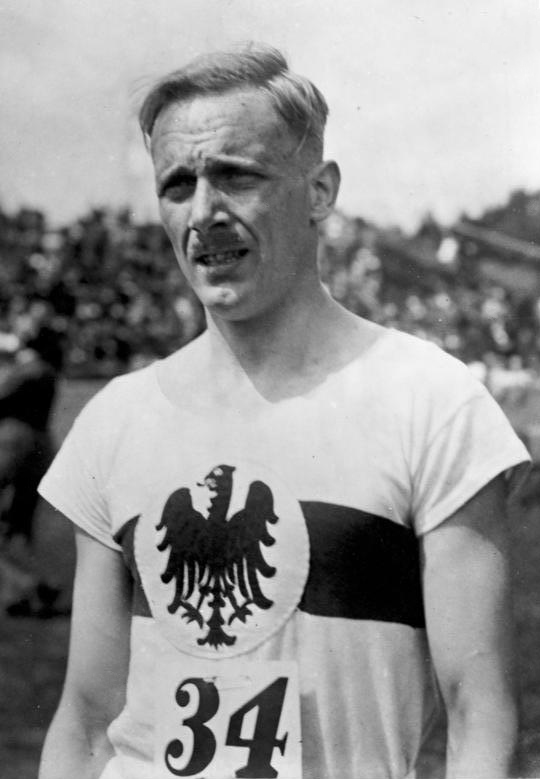
- Peltzer in 1928

Personal information
- Born: 8 March 1900 Drage, Steinburg, Province of Schleswig-Holstein, Kingdom of Prussia, German Empire
- Died: 11 August 1970 (aged 70) Eutin, Schleswig-Holstein, West Germany

Sport
- Sport: Athletics
- Events: 200–1500 m, hurdles

Achievements and titles
- Personal bests: 200 m – 22.1 (1925); 400 m – 48.8 (1925); 800 m – 1:50.9 (1926); 1500 m – 3:51.0 (1926); 400 mH – 54.8 (1927)

Otto Paul Eberhard Peltzer (8 March 1900 – 11 August 1970) was a German middle distance runner who set world records in the 1920s. Over the 800 m Peltzer improved Ted Meredith's long-standing record by 0.3 seconds to 1:51.6 min in London in July 1926. Over the 1000 m he set a world record of 2:25.8 in Paris in July 1927, and over 1500 m Peltzer broke Paavo Nurmi's world record (3:52.6) and set a new one at 3:51.0 in Berlin in September 1926. Peltzer was the only athlete to have held the 800 m and the 1500 m world records simultaneously, until Sebastian Coe matched the feat over fifty years later.

== Biography ==
Born in Ellernbrook-Drage in Holstein, Peltzer overcame childhood ill-health to become a successful athlete, winning his first German championship at age twenty-two. He started university in Munich in 1918, joining the TSV 1860 club, where he was nicknamed "Otto der Seltsame" (Otto the Strange). He continued in Munich, receiving his doctorate in 1925. In 1926 he was one of a group of German athletes invited to the AAA Championships at Stamford Bridge stadium in London, where he won the 800 metres event at the 1926 AAA Championships, beating Britain's Douglas Lowe, who had won the event at the 1924 Olympic Games which, along with the 1920 Games, Germany had been barred from entering. In 1926, a specially arranged 1500 m race between Peltzer, Paavo Nurmi of Finland, Edvin Wide of Sweden and Herbert Bocher of Germany took place in Berlin which was won by Peltzer in a new world record time.

Shortly before the 1928 Olympic Games in Amsterdam, to which German athletes were again allowed to enter with Peltzer elected as team leader, Peltzer was injured in an accident while playing handball. Although he recovered enough to take part in the 800 m heats, he failed to qualify for the final. In 1932 he was team captain, but poor arrangements left the German team trying to run with spiked shoes on the hard Olympic track. Peltzer made the final, but did not finish.

Peltzer was often persecuted for his homosexuality. In 1933 he joined the Nazi Party and the SS. However, in June 1935 he was sentenced to 18 months imprisonment for 'homosexual offences with youths'. He was released early on condition that he would end his involvement in sport, but was rearrested in 1937. After spending time in Denmark, Finland (where he slept rough and contracted bronchitis) and Sweden, he returned to Germany in 1941 having been assured that the charges against him would be dropped. However, he was arrested and sent to KZ Mauthausen, where he remained until the camp was liberated on 5 May 1945.

With homosexuality remaining a criminal offence in 1950s Germany, and Peltzer in conflict with the German Athletic Association (DLV) and Carl Diem, Peltzer's opportunities to coach athletics were limited in Germany. He obtained a commission from a German newspaper to report on the Melbourne Olympics of 1956. After those games, he tried unsuccessfully to get work with various national athletics organisations. He eventually came to India, coached in the national athletics stadium in New Delhi, and founded the Olympic Youth Delhi club, later renamed the Otto Peltzer Memorial Athletic Club in his honour.

Following a heart attack in 1967, Peltzer was persuaded to return to Germany, and was treated in hospital in Holstein. After attending an athletics meeting in Eutin, Schleswig-Holstein, Peltzer collapsed and was found dead on a path towards the car park.

In 2000 the DLV established the Otto Peltzer Medal given to outstanding athletes.

Records
Preceded by (United States) Ted Meredith	Men's 800 metres World Record Holder; 3 July 1926 – 14 July 1928	Succeeded by (France) Séra Martin
Preceded by (Finland) Paavo Nurmi	Men's 1500 metres World Record Holder; 11 September 1926 – 4 October 1930	Succeeded by (France) Jules Ladoumegue
Preceded by —	European Record Holder Men's 800m 3 July 1926 – 14 July 1928	Succeeded by (France) Séra Martin
Preceded by (Finland) Paavo Nurmi	European Record Holder Men's 1500m 11 September 1926 – 4 October 1930	Succeeded by (France) Jules Ladoumegue
