= 1929 AAA Championships =

Outdoor track and field competition

- Dates: 5–6 July 1929
- Host city: London, England
- Venue: Stamford Bridge
- Level: Senior
- Type: Outdoor
- Events: 24

The 1929 AAA Championships was the 1929 edition of the annual outdoor track and field competition organised by the Amateur Athletic Association (AAA). It was held from 5 to 6 July 1929 at Stamford Bridge in London, England.

The Championships consisted of 24 events and covered two days of competition. The marathon was held from Windsor to Stamford Bridge.

== Results ==
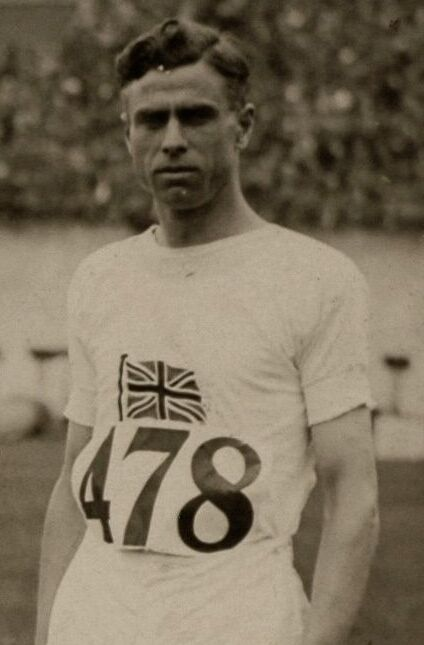
Harry Payne retained his marathon title

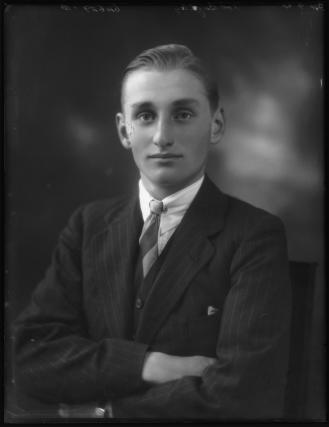
David Cecil (Lord Burghley), winner of the sprint hurdles

Event	Gold		Silver		Bronze	
100 yards	Jack London	10.0	William Simmons	1½ yd	(Italy) Edgardo Toetti	1 ft
220 yards	John Hanlon	21.9	Stanley Engelhart	1½ yd	John Rinkel	1 ft
440 yards	John Hanlon	49.4	(Hungary) László Barsi	6 yd	Laurence Neame	4 yd
880 yards	Cyril Ellis	1:54.6	(Wales) Reg Thomas	1:55.2	Michael Gutteridge	6 yd
1 mile	Cyril Ellis	4:22.0	Stanley Ashby	1 yd	Stan Tomlin	4:28.0
4 miles	Walter Beavers	19:49.4	(Poland) Stanislaw Pietkiewicz	19:54.6	(Scotland) James Wood	20:00.6
10 miles	Ernest Harper	52:15.8	Jack Holden	52:35.0	(Scotland) John Suttie Smith	53:45.2
marathon	Harry Payne	2:30:57.6 ER	(Northern Ireland) Sam Ferris	2:39:12.0	Ernest Leatherland	2:49:22.0
steeplechase	Edward Oliver	10:53.2	Herbert Townsend	11:01.0	Vernon Morgan	11:16.0
120y hurdles	Lord Burghley	15.4	Francis Foley	2 yd	Donald Finlay	6 yd
440y hurdles	(Italy) Luigi Facelli	53.4	Lord Burghley	55.0	Douglas Neame	20 yd
2 miles walk	Alf Pope	13:57.6	Bert Cooper	14:00.2	Cecil Hyde	14:10.0
7 miles walk	Cecil Hyde	53:38.6	Alf Pope	55:17.6	John Reddish	55:47.4
high jump	(Hungary) Kornél Késmárki	1.905	(Norway) Einar Tommelstad	1.854	(Republic of Ireland) Con O'Connor; Alec James	1.803; 1.803
pole jump	Howard Ford	3.58	Fred Housden; Jack Longland (Netherlands) Age van der Zee	3.50; 3.50; 3.50	n/a	
long jump	James Cohen	6.88	(Netherlands) Anton van Welsenses	6.88	(Netherlands) Willem Peters	6.75
triple jump	(Netherlands) Willem Peters	14.22	Harold Langley	13.40	Arthur Gray	13.16
shot put	(Hungary) József Daranyi	14.20	Robert Howland	12.85	(Belgium) Auguste Vos	12.62
discus throw	(Norway) Harald Stenerud	43.54	(Hungary) József Daranyi	41.16	(Republic of Ireland) Tim Healy	40.30
hammer throw	(Republic of Ireland) Bill Britton	47.60	(Republic of Ireland) John McSweeney	45.62	(Norway) Harald Stenerud	43.98
javelin throw	(Hungary) Bela Szepes	66.70	(Belgium) Jules Herremans	56.52	(Scotland) James Dalrymple	53.46
440 yards relay	Polytechnic Harriers		Surrey AC		South London Harriers	
Tug of war (100 st)	London Fire Brigade		B Division MPAC Gerald Road		Luton Borough Police AC; Royal Naval Barracks Portsmouth	
Tug of war (catch weight)	London Fire Brigade		Luton Borough Police AC		B Division MPAC Gerald Road; Monmouthshire Police	

== See also ==
- 1929 WAAA Championships
