= Ben Hedges =

American high jumper (1907–1969)

Olympic medal record

Men's athletics

Representing the United States
Silver medal – second place	1928 Amsterdam	High jump

Benjamin Van Doren Hedges, Jr. (June 8, 1907 – December 31, 1969) was an American athlete who competed mainly in the high jump. He graduated from Princeton University in 1930.

He competed for the United States in the 1928 Summer Olympics held in Amsterdam, Netherlands in the high jump where he won the silver medal, clearing 1.91 meters (6' 3-1/4"). Prior to graduating from Princeton in 1930, Ben Hedges won the IC4A high jump in 1929 With his second place in the 1928 high jump, Hedges is the last Princetonian to have won an Olympic track & field medal. In 1931, Hedges joined Bankers Trust Co. as a personnel administrator and later became executive vice-president of the Big Brother Movement. He was also a Second World War hero, winning 13 Battle Stars and receiving a Presidential Unit Citation for his work in the Pacific as an air combat intelligence officer.

== See also ==
- List of Princeton University Olympians
