= Harald Stenerud =

Norwegian discus and hammer thrower

Personal information
- Nationality: Norwegian
- Born: 10 May 1897 Moss, Viken, Norway
- Died: 5 February 1976 (aged 78) Bergen, Vestland, Norway
- Height: 186 cm (6 ft 1 in)
- Weight: 97 kg (214 lb)

Sport
- Sport: Athletics
- Event: discus/hammer
- Club: TIF Viking, Berge

Harald Stenerud (10 May 1897 – 5 February 1976) was a Norwegian hammer and discus thrower who competed at the Olympic Games. He represented TIF Viking in Bergen.

== Biography ==
At the 1928 Summer Olympics he finished fourth in the discus final with a throw of 45.80 metres (150.3 ft) and sixteenth in the hammer final with a throw of 41.06 metres (134.7 ft). He became Norwegian champion in discus throw in 1928 and 1931, and in hammer throw in the years 1928–1931 and 1933–1935.

His personal best discus throw was 47.20 metres (154.9 ft), achieved in August 1929 at Bislett stadion. A year earlier, on the same field, he had set a career best in hammer throw with 50.39 metres (165.3 ft).

Stenerud won the British AAA Championships title in the discus throw event at the 1929 AAA Championships and finished third behind Bill Britton in the hammer throw event.
