= Wilhelm Effern =

Dutch middle-distance runner

Personal information
- Nationality: Dutch
- Born: 21 January 1907 Vlaardingen, Netherlands
- Died: 28 May 1990 (aged 83) IJmuiden, Netherlands

Sport
- Sport: Middle-distance running
- Event: 1500 metres

Wilhelm Fredrik Effern (21 January 1907 – 28 May 1990) was a Dutch middle-distance runner. He competed for the Netherlands in the men's 1500 metres at the 1928 Summer Olympics.
