= Reggie Bell =

British middle-distance runner (1904–1988)

Personal information
- Nationality: British
- Born: 8 September 1904 Bromley, England
- Died: 13 October 1988 (aged 84) Crawley, England

Sport
- Sport: Middle-distance running
- Event: 1500 metres
- Club: Blackheath Harriers

Reginald Dalton Bell (4 September 1904 – 13 October 1988) was a British middle-distance runner. He competed in the men's 1500 metres at the 1928 Summer Olympics.
