= Ernst Paulus =

German discus thrower

Personal information
- Nationality: German
- Born: 3 January 1897 Marburg, Hessen, Germany
- Died: 12 September 1986 (aged 89) West-Berlin, Berlin, Germany
- Height: 202 cm (6 ft 8 in)
- Weight: 101 kg (223 lb)

Sport
- Sport: Athletics
- Event: discus
- Club: WfL Wetzlar

Ernst Paulus (3 January 1897 – 12 September 1986) was a German athlete who competed in the 1928 Summer Olympics.

== Career ==
Paulus won the British AAA Championships title in the discus throw event at the 1928 AAA Championships. Shortly afterwards he represented Germany at the 1928 Olympic Games in Amsterdam, Netherlands.
