= Alex Docherty =

Canadian middle-distance runner

Personal information
- Full name: Georg Alexander Docherty
- Born: 6 May 2006 Toronto, Ontario, Canada
- Died: 3 November 1973 (aged 69)

Sport
- Sport: Middle-distance running
- Event: 1500 metres

Georg Alexander Docherty (6 May 1904 – 3 November 1973) was a Canadian middle-distance runner. He competed in the men's 1500 metres at the 1928 Summer Olympics.

By that summer, Dochetry's own time in the mile was 9 minutes and 19seconds, recorded during local coverage of his pending return. Dochetry attempted to make another comeback in 1934, and local media at the time alluded to him teaming up with Canada's then-record holder for the mile run Les Wade.
