= Herbert Böcher =

German middle-distance runner

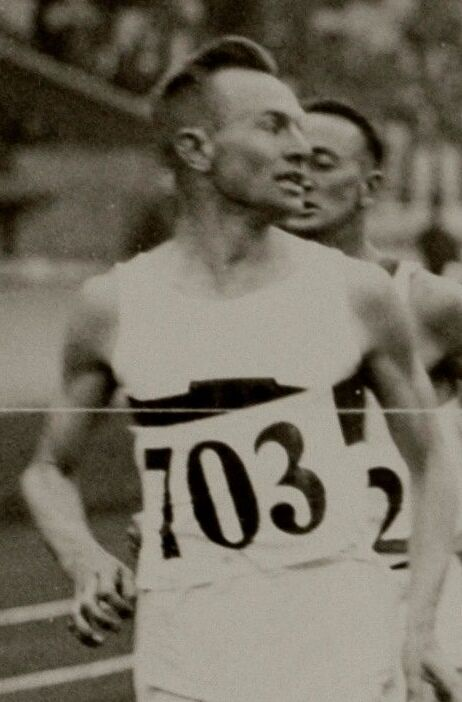
- Herbert Böcher in 1928

Personal information
- Nationality: German
- Born: 22 February 1903 Siegen, Nordrhein-Westfalen, Germany
- Died: 14 January 1983 (aged 79) Koppl, Salzburg, Austria
- Height: 172 cm (5 ft 8 in)
- Weight: 63 kg (139 lb)

Sport
- Sport: Middle-distance running
- Event: 1500 metres
- Club: Teutonia 1899 Berlin

Oskar Herbert Böcher (22 February 1903 – 14 January 1983) was a German middle-distance runner who competed at the 1928 Summer Olympics.

== Career ==
Böcher finished second behind Georges Baraton in the 1 mile event at the 1926 AAA Championships.

Böcher competed in the men's 1500 metres at the 1928 Olympic Games.
