= Kornél Késmárki =

Hungarian high jumper

Personal information
- Nationality: Hungarian
- Born: 28 October 1903 Budapest, Hungary
- Died: 1965 (aged 61–62)
- Height: 185 cm (6 ft 1 in)
- Weight: 77 kg (170 lb)

Sport
- Sport: Athletics
- Event: High jump
- Club: BBTE, Budapest

Kornél Vilmos Késmárki (28 October 1903 – 1965) was a Hungarian athlete who competed at the 1928 Summer Olympics.

== Biography ==
Késmárki competed in the men's high jump at the 1928 Olympics games in Amsterdam.

Késmárki won the British AAA Championships title in the high jump event at the 1929 AAA Championships.
