= Eino Purje =

Finnish middle-distance runner

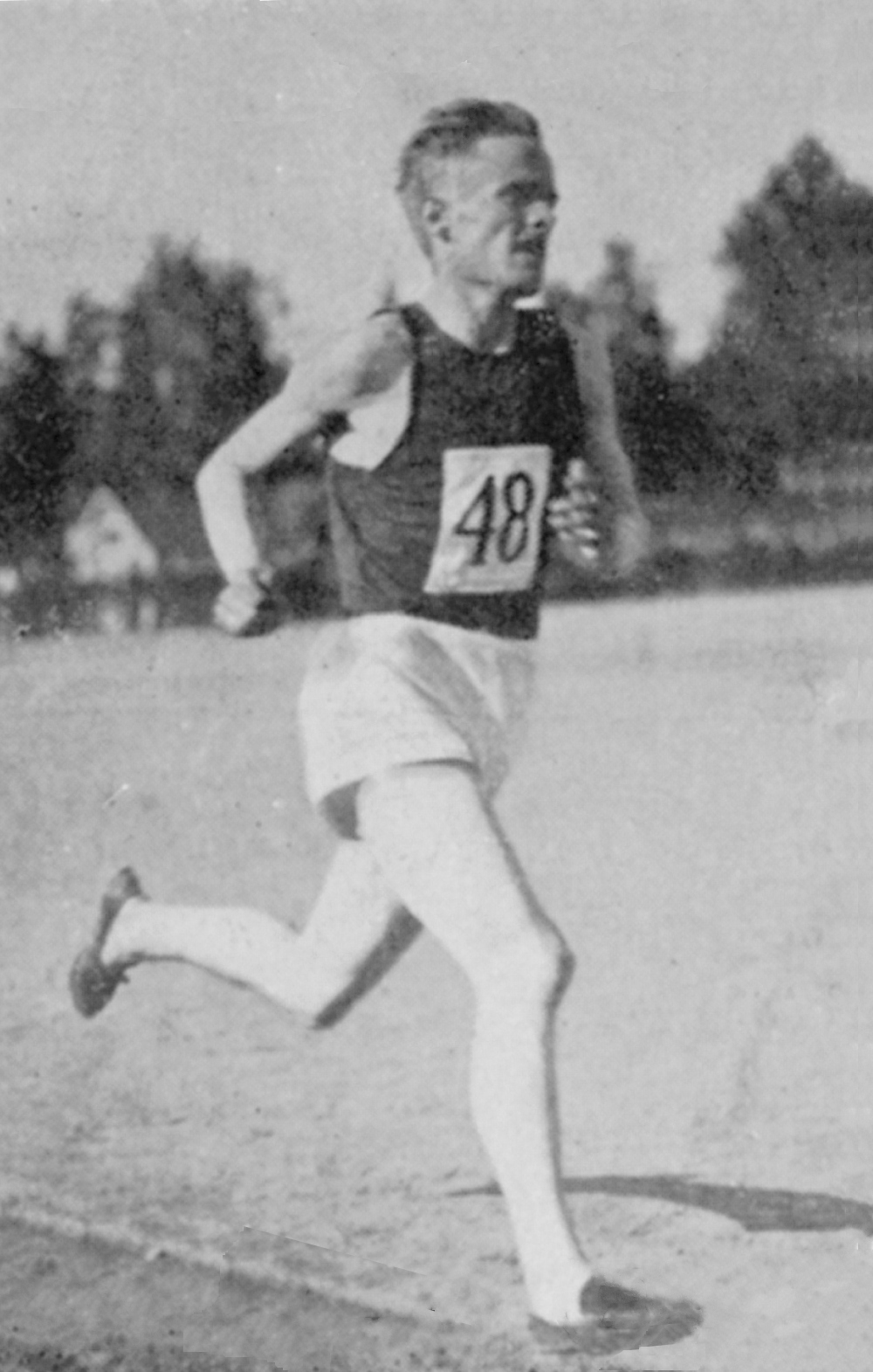
- Eino Purje c. 1930

Personal information
- Born: 21 February 1900 Kymi, Grand Duchy of Finland, Russian Empire
- Died: 2 September 1984 (aged 84) Tervo, Finland
- Height: 1.74 m (5 ft 9 in)
- Weight: 66–68 kg (146–150 lb)

Sport
- Sport: Athletics
- Event: 800–5000 m
- Club: HT, Helsinki

Achievements and titles
- Personal best(s): 800 m – 1:55.2 (1927); 1500 m – 3:53.1 (1928); 5000 m – 14:39.3 (1928)
Medal record
Representing Finland
Olympic Games
Bronze medal – third place	1928 Amsterdam	1500 metres

Eino Alfred Purje (21 February 1900 – 2 September 1984) was a middle-distance runner from Finland, who won the bronze medal in the 1500 metres at the 1928 Summer Olympics. He also reached the finals of the 5000 m race in 1928 and 1500 m event in 1932.
