= Ioannis Karyofyllis (athlete) =

Greek high jumper

Personal information
- Nationality: Greek
- Born: 1908

Sport
- Sport: Athletics
- Event: High jump

Ioannis Karyofyllis (born 1908, date of death unknown) was a Greek athlete. He competed in the men's high jump at the 1928 Summer Olympics.
