= Adolf Kittel =

Czech middle-distance runner

Personal information
- Nationality: Czech
- Born: 4 July 1902

Sport
- Country: Czechoslovakia
- Sport: Middle-distance running
- Event: 800 metres

Adolf Kittel (born 4 July 1902, date of death unknown) was a Czech middle-distance runner. He competed for Czechoslovakia in the men's 800 metres at the 1928 Summer Olympics.
