= József Darányi =

Hungarian shot putter

Personal information
- Nationality: Hungarian
- Born: 28 September 1905 Devecser, Veszprém, Hungary
- Died: 23 December 1990 (aged 850) Veresegyház, Pest, Hungary
- Height: 185 cm (6 ft 1 in)
- Weight: 93 kg (205 lb)

Sport
- Sport: Athletics
- Event: shot put
- Club: MAC, Budapest

József Darányi (28 September 1905 – 23 December 1990) was a Hungarian shot putter who competed in the 1928 Summer Olympics, in the 1932 Summer Olympics, and in the 1936 Summer Olympics.

== Career ==
Darányi broke the world record in both-handed shot put (an event in which the shot was thrown with the right hand and separately with the left hand, and the best results for each hand were added together) on three occasions. He first broke Ralph Rose's world record of 28.00 m in June 1931, achieving a total of 28.04 m (14.80 m/13.24 m). Three months later he improved to 28.67 m (15.43 m/13.24 m). Darányi lost the record to Jack Torrance in 1934, but regained it the following year with a total of 29.46 m (15.77 m/13.69 m), his eventual best.

Darányi finished second behind Georg Brechenmacher in the shot put event at the 1927 AAA Championships. Two years later Darányi won the British AAA title in the shot put event at the 1929 AAA Championships and successfully regained the British AAA Championships shot put title at the 1931 AAA Championships.
