= Henry Simmons (cricketer) =

Barbadian cricketer (1871–1934)

Personal information
- Born: 16 November 1871; Christ Church, Barbados
- Died: 11 July 1934 (aged 62); Christ Church, Barbados
- Batting: Right-handed
- Bowling: Right-arm fast
- Source: Cricinfo, 17 November 2020

Henry Peter Carter Simmons-Anderson (16 November 1871 – 11 July 1934) was a Barbadian cricketer. He played in eleven first-class matches for the Barbados cricket team from 1898 to 1908.
