= Emmanuel Degland =

French javelin thrower

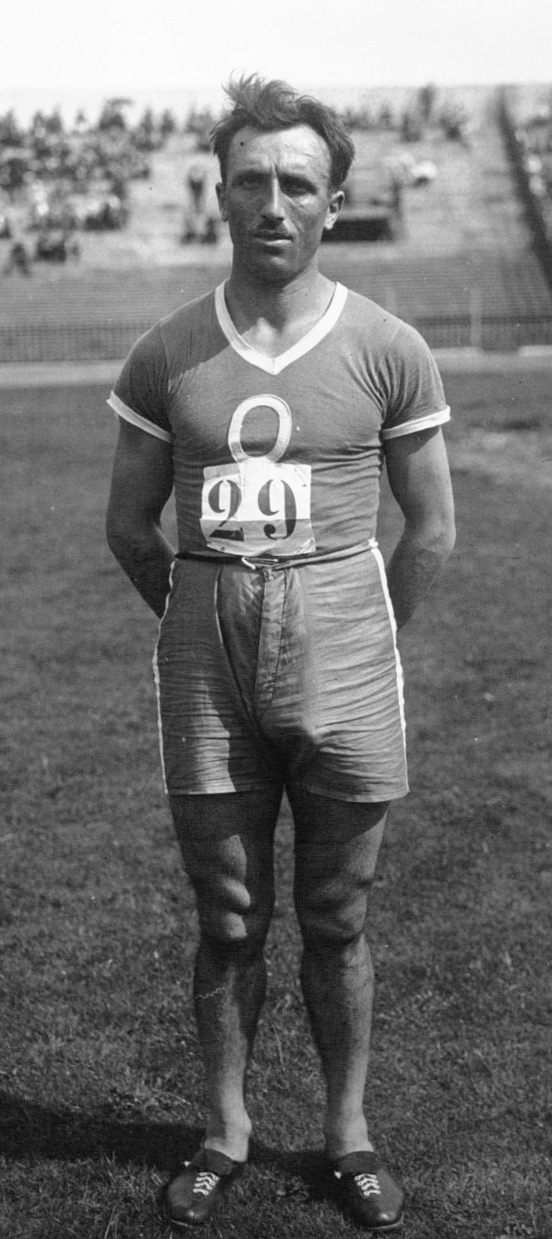
- Emmanuel Degland in 1927

Personal information
- Born: 14 May 1900 Sainte-Marie, Ille-et-Vilaine, France
- Died: 19 May 1969 (aged 69) Sainte-Marie, France
- Height: 1.83 m (6 ft 0 in)
- Weight: 77 kg (170 lb)

Sport
- Sport: Athletics
- Event: Javelin throw
- Club: WH Suresnes; Red Star Olympique, Paris

Achievements and titles
- Personal best: JT – 61.34 m (1928)

Emmanuel Degland (14 May 1900 – 19 May 1969) was a French javelin thrower who competed at two Olympic Games.

== Career ==
Degland competed at the 1924 Summer Olympics and finished in 21st place in the javelin throw.

Degland finished third behind Stanley Lay in the javelin throw event at the 1928 AAA Championships. Shortly afterwards he represented France at the 1928 Olympic Games in Amsterdam, Netherlands, where he finished in 24th place.
