= Reg Thomas (runner) =

Welsh middle-distance runner (1907–1946)

Reg Thomas AFC
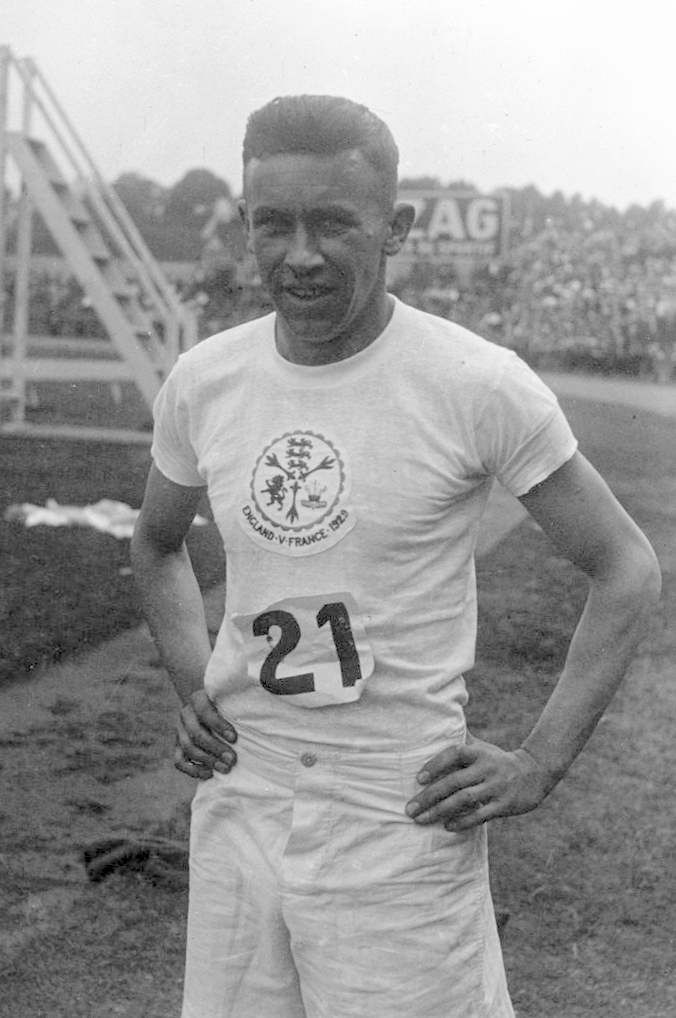
- Reginald Thomas in 1929

Personal information
- Born: 11 January 1907 Pembroke, Pembrokeshire, Wales
- Died: 14 March 1946 (aged 39) Brownshill, Chalford, Gloucestershire, England
- Military career
- Allegiance: United Kingdom
- Branch: Royal Air Force
- Service years: 1940-46
- Rank: Squadron leader
- Conflicts: World War II
- Awards: AFC

Sport
- Sport: Athletics
- Event: 800–5000 m
- Club: Royal Air Force; Milocarian Athletic Club; Newport Harriers

Achievements and titles
- Personal bests: 800 m – 1:53.6 (1929/37); 1500 m – 3:53.5 (1937); 3 miles – 14:53.4 (1935)
Medal record
Representing England
British Empire Games
Gold medal – first place	1930 Hamilton	1 mile
Silver medal – second place	1930 Hamilton	880 yards

Reginald Heber Thomas AFC (11 January 1907 – 14 March 1946) was a Welsh middle-distance runner, who competed at two Olympic Games.

== Biography ==
Thomas finished second behind Cyril Ellis in the 1 mile event at the 1928 AAA Championships. Shortly afterwards he represented Great Britain at the 1928 Olympic Games in Amsterdam, Netherlands, where he eliminated in the first round of the 1500 metres event.

In 1929 Thomas finished second again behind Cyril Ellis at the 1929 AAA Championships but became the national mile champion the following year after winning the British AAA Championships title at the 1930 AAA Championships. Just one month later at the 1930 British Empire Games in Hamilton, Ontario, he won the gold medal in the mile and the silver medal in the 880 yards. He could not compete for Wales because Wales did not have a national athletics association at the time. Welsh track and field athletes could only compete for England in 1930 although Welsh swimmers did compete for their home nation.

In 1931 he broke the 10 year old British record for the mile with 4 mins. 13.4 secs to underline his status as Britain's leading miler and retained his 1-mile AAA title at the 1931 AAA Championships. He went to his second Olympic Games at the Los Angeles 1932 Summer Olympics, again being eliminated from the first round of the 1500 metres event.

At the 1933 AAA Championships, Thomas won his third 1-mile title but did not compete in the 1934 British Empire Games for Wales, because of English objections. He missed the 1936 Summer Olympics because of injury and also in 1936 secured his eighth and last Welsh title.

In 1940, Heber was commissioned in the Royal Air Force. On 8 June 1944 Thomas, now a flight lieutenant, was awarded the Air Force Cross (AFC).

In 1946 he was a squadron leader and was killed piloting an Avro Lancaster bomber; after take-off from RAF Aston Down all the engines failed and the bomber crashed into a nursing home at Brownshill near Chalford. He was buried at Haycombe Cemetery in Bath.
