= Hans-Helmuth Krause =

German middle-distance runner

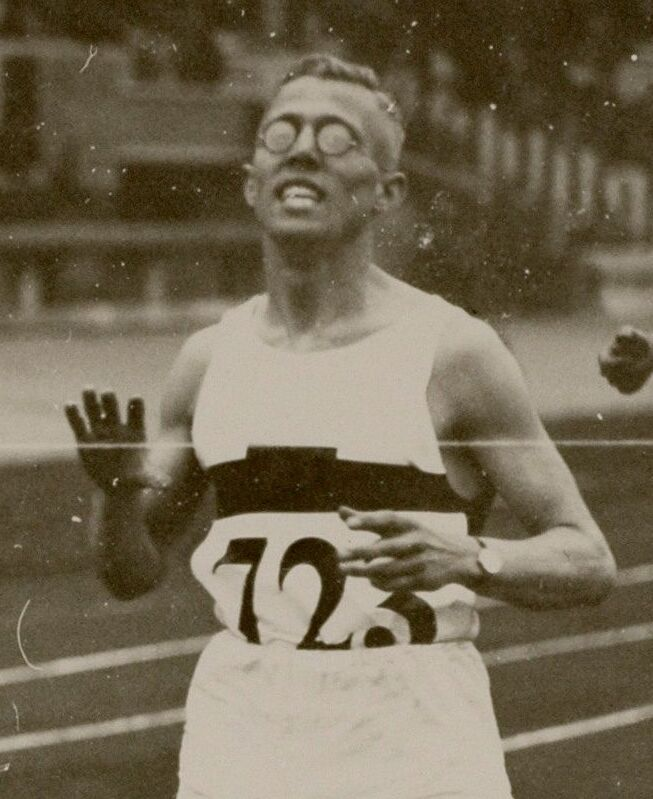
- Helmut Krause in 1928

Personal information
- Nationality: German
- Born: 18 July 1907
- Died: 26 February 1944 (aged 37)

Sport
- Sport: Middle-distance running
- Event: 1500 metres

Hans-Helmuth Krause (18 July 1907 – 26 February 1944) was a German middle-distance runner. He competed in the men's 1500 metres at the 1928 Summer Olympics. He was killed in action during World War II.
