= Harri Larva =

Finnish middle-distance runner

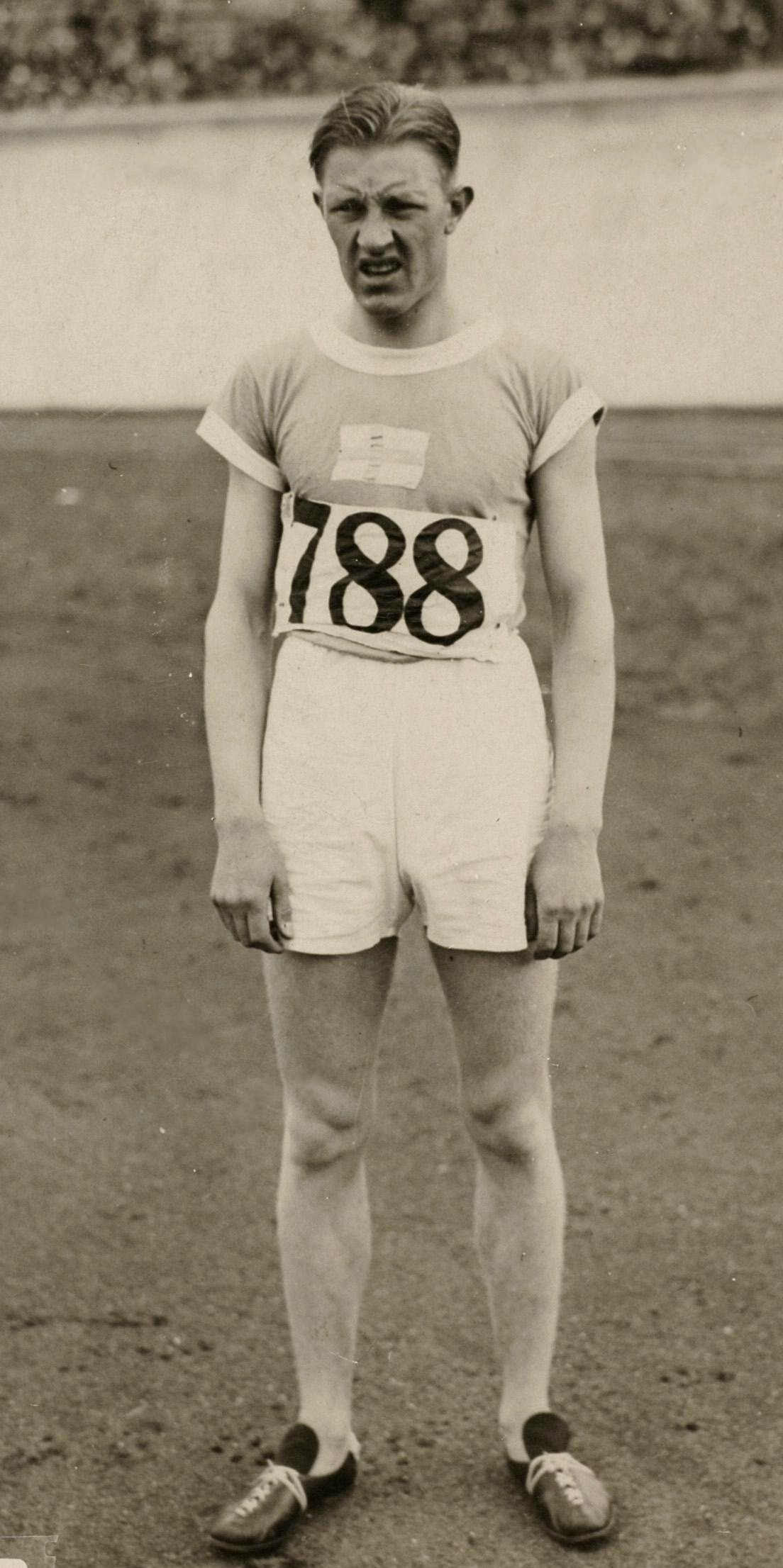
- Harri Larva at the 1928 Olympics

Personal information
- Born: 9 September 1906 Turku, Grand Duchy of Finland, Russian Empire
- Died: 15 November 1980 (aged 74) Turku, Finland
- Height: 1.80 m (5 ft 11 in)
- Weight: 68 kg (150 lb)

Sport
- Sport: Running
- Club: Turun Urheiluliitto, Turku
Medal record
Representing Finland
Olympic Games
Gold medal – first place	1928 Amsterdam	1500 metres

Harry Edvin "Harri" Larva (born Lagerström; 9 September 1906 – 15 November 1980) was a Finnish athlete who won the 1500 m race at the 1928 Summer Olympics. He never excelled in this event nationally and was the Finnish champion in the 800 m in 1928–1930 and 1934. Larva finished 10th in the 1500 m at the 1932 Summer Olympics.

Larva was requested to change his last name in 1928 by Urho Kekkonen, then president of Finnish Athletics Union and later president of Finland, who thought that his birth name Lagerström did not sound Finnish enough.
