= Bill Britton (athlete) =

Irish athletics competitor

Personal information
- Nationality: Irish
- Born: 12 October 1890 Ballydonnell, Mullinahone, County Tipperary, Ireland
- Died: 15 February 1965 (aged 74) Bray, County Wicklow, Ireland

Sport
- Sport: Track and field
- Events: Hammer throw 220 yards 880 yards mile long jump high jump triple jump
- Club: Ballinamore Athletic Club

Achievements and titles
- Personal best: hammer: 49.62 m
Medal record
Men's athletics
Representing Ireland
British Empire Games
Silver medal – second place	1930 Hamilton	hammer

William T. Britton (12 October 1890 – 15 February 1965) was an Irish athlete.

== Biography ==
Britton was born near Mullinahone to a farming family. He attended Coláiste Éamann Rís in Callan and worked as a bank clerk in the Munster and Leinster Bank.

Britton excelled in high jump, long jump, 120 yd hurdles, triple jump and hammer throw, winning Gaelic Athletic Association, National Athletic and Cycling Association and Amateur Athletic Association of England titles.

Britton won the British AAA Championships title in the hammer throw event at the 1928 AAA Championships. He repeated the success at both the 1929 AAA Championships and the 1933 AAA Championships.

The high point of Britton's career was representing Ireland at the 1930 British Empire Games in Hamilton, Canada, where he won silver in the hammer throw with a throw of 153′ 10″ (46.89 m).
