= Harry Symonds (footballer) =

Australian rules footballer

Herb Symonds

Personal information
- Full name: Henry Stace Symonds
- Born: 22 December 1880; Port Albert, Victoria
- Died: 15 May 1963 (aged 82); Hartwell, Victoria
- Original team: Melbourne Trades

Playing career^{1}
Years	Club	Games (Goals)
1907	Melbourne	4 (3)
- ^{1} Playing statistics correct to the end of 1907.

Harry 'Herb' Symonds (22 December 1880 – 15 May 1963) was an Australian rules footballer who played with Melbourne in the Victorian Football League (VFL).
