= Harry Simmons (high jumper) =

British high jumper

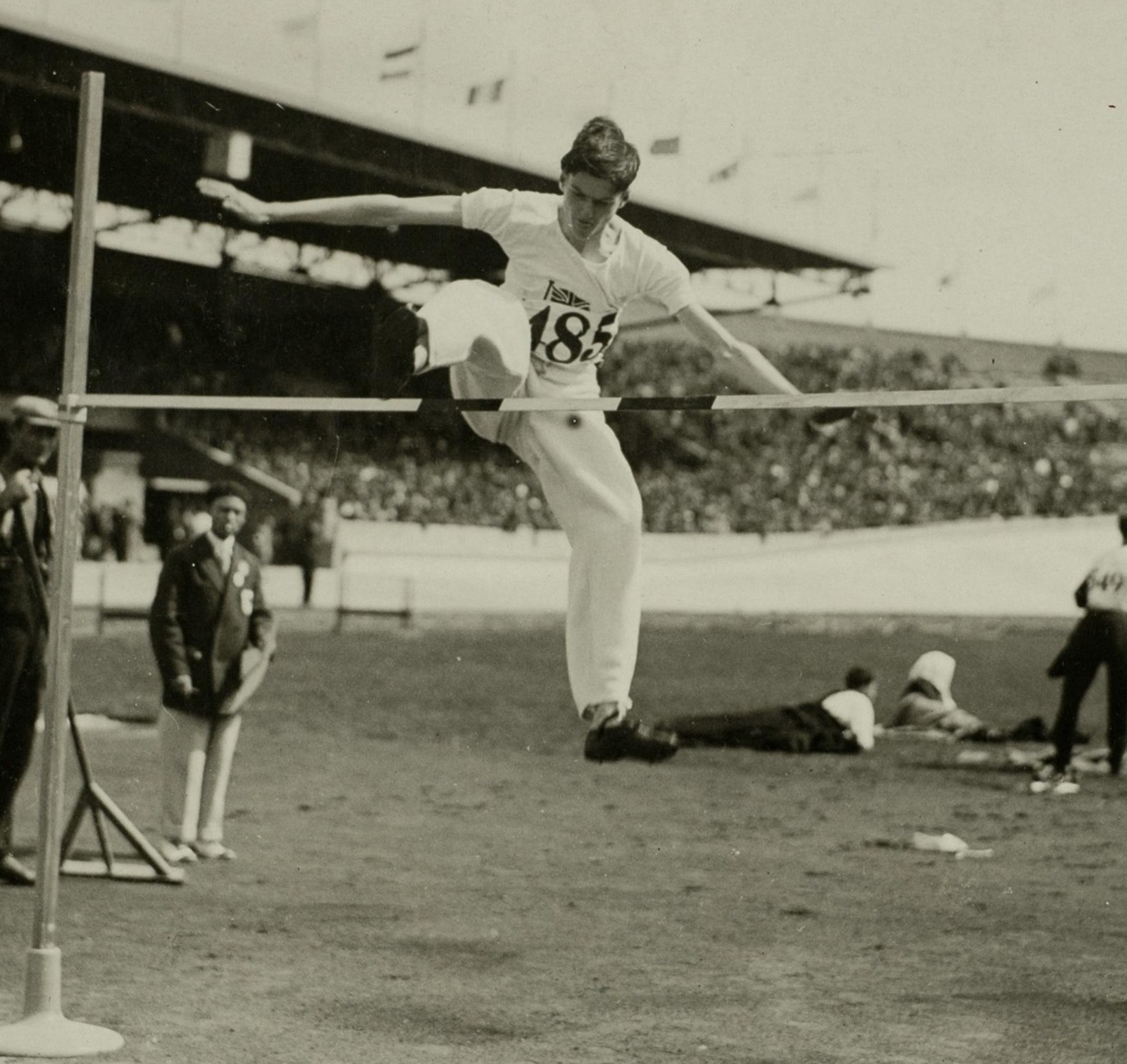
- Simmons at the 1928 Olympics

Personal information
- Born: 21 February 1911 Southampton, England
- Died: 23 March 1944 (aged 33) Hardwick, Northamptonshire, England

Sport
- Sport: High jump
- Club: London Athletic Club; Southampton Amateur Athletic Club

Achievements and titles
- Olympic finals: 1928

Henry Augustus Simmons (21 February 1911 – 23 March 1944) was an English high jumper who competed at the 1928 Summer Olympics.

== Biography ==
In 1927 Simmons a pupil at Taunton School won the Public Schools title. At the age of 17 Simmons competed for the London Athletic Club and finished third behind Claude Ménard in the high jump event at the 1928 AAA Championships. Shortly afterwards he represented Great Britain at the 1928 Summer Olympics in Amsterdam, Netherlands, where he finished in 11th place.

The same year he set a British junior record at 1.86 m. Simmons was a Royal Air Force officer and won the RAF high jump title in 1930, 1932 and 1935.

Simmons served as a wing commander in the Royal Air Force Volunteer Reserve during the Second World War. On 23 March 1944, Simmons died piloting Vickers Wellington LP258, which stalled and crashed near Hardwick, Northamptonshire. Simmons and five other crew members were killed. He is buried at Oxford (Botley) Cemetery.
