= Séra Martin =

French middle-distance runner (1906–1993)

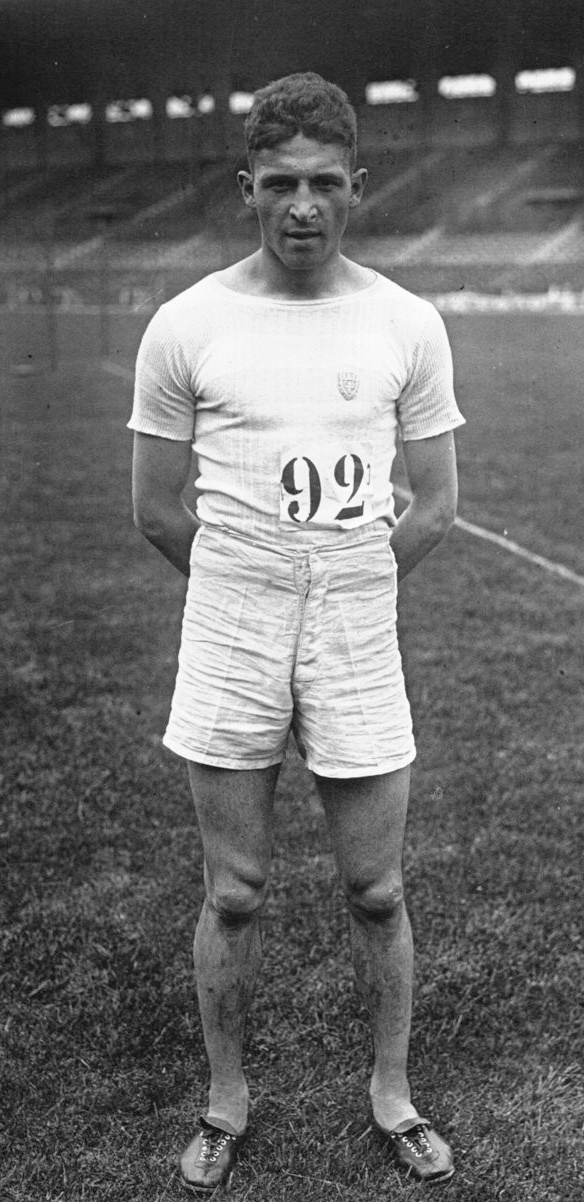
- Séra Martin in 1927

Personal information
- Full name: Séraphin Martin
- Born: 2 July 1906 Nice, France
- Died: 23 April 1993 (aged 86)
- Height: 1.79 m (5 ft 10 in)
- Weight: 68 kg (150 lb)

Sport
- Sport: Athletics
- Events: 800 m, 1500 m
- Club: Stade français, Paris

Achievements and titles
- Olympic finals: 1928, 1932
- Personal bests: 800 m – 1:50.6 (1928); 1500 m – 3:54.6 (1926)

Séraphin "Séra" Martin (2 July 1906 – 23 April 1993) was a French middle-distance runner who set world records in the 800 metres and 1000 metres. He competed at the 1928 and 1932 Olympics and placed sixth and eighth in the 800 metres, respectively.

== Career ==
Martin set a world record at 1000 metres in 1926, running 2:26.8 to break Sven Lundgren's old record of 2:28.6. Two weeks before the 1928 Summer Olympics, Martin ran 800 metres in 1:50.6, breaking Otto Peltzer's world record by a full second. (Note: The qualitative difference between these records was much smaller. Peltzer's time of 1:51.6 was set at 880 yards and was roughly equivalent to 1:50.9 for 800 metres.) This established him as one of the favourites for the Olympics in Amsterdam. He did make the Olympic final, but was never a major factor in the race and finished sixth in a time of 1:54.6, clearly slower than the 1:53.0 he ran in the semi-finals.

Martin finished second behind Tommy Hampson in the 880 yards event at the 1930 AAA Championships.

He returned to the Olympics in 1932, placing eighth with a time of 1:53.6. Martin was one of the pacemakers when Jules Ladoumègue set his world record at 1500 metres.

== Notes ==
Records
Preceded by (Germany) Otto Peltzer	Men's 800 metres World Record Holder; 14 July 1928 – 2 August 1932	Succeeded by (United Kingdom) Tommy Hampson
Preceded by (Sweden) Sven Lundgren	Men's 1000 metres World Record Holder; 30 September 1926 – 18 September 1927	Succeeded by (Germany) Otto Peltzer
