= Cyril Ellis (athlete) =

British middle-distance runner (1904–1973)

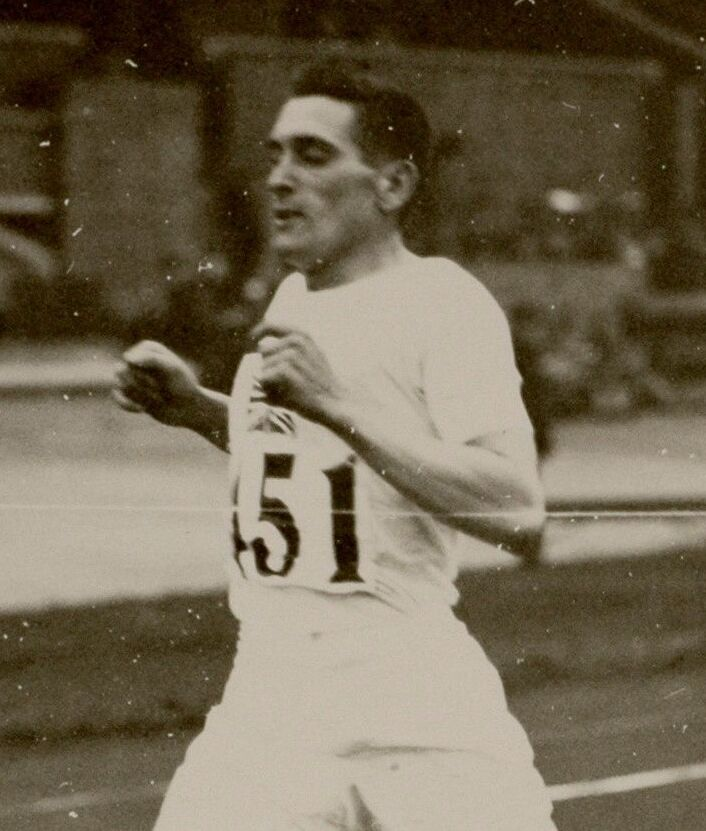
- Cyril Ellis in 1928

Personal information
- Nationality: British (English)
- Born: 23 February 1904 Mansfield, England
- Died: 29 March 1973 (aged 69) Chelmsford, England

Sport
- Sport: Athletics
- Event: Middle-distance running
- Club: Birchfield Harriers

Cyril Ellis (23 February 1904 – 29 March 1973) was a British athlete who competed at the 1924 Summer Olympics and the 1928 Summer Olympics.

== Career ==
At the 1924 Olympic Games in Paris, France, Ellis participated in the 1500 metres event, where he was eliminated in the semi-finals after finishing in 3rd place. The following year Ellis finished second behind Bertram Macdonald in the 1 mile event at the 1925 AAA Championships.

Ellis became the national 1 mile champion after winning the British AAA Championships title at the 1927 AAA Championships and duly retained his title for the next two years at the 1928 AAA Championships and the 1929 AAA Championships.

He competed in a second Olympic Games in 1928, where he won his semi-final and reached the Olympic final, finishing fifth in the 1500 metres.
