= Claude Ménard (athlete) =

French high jumper

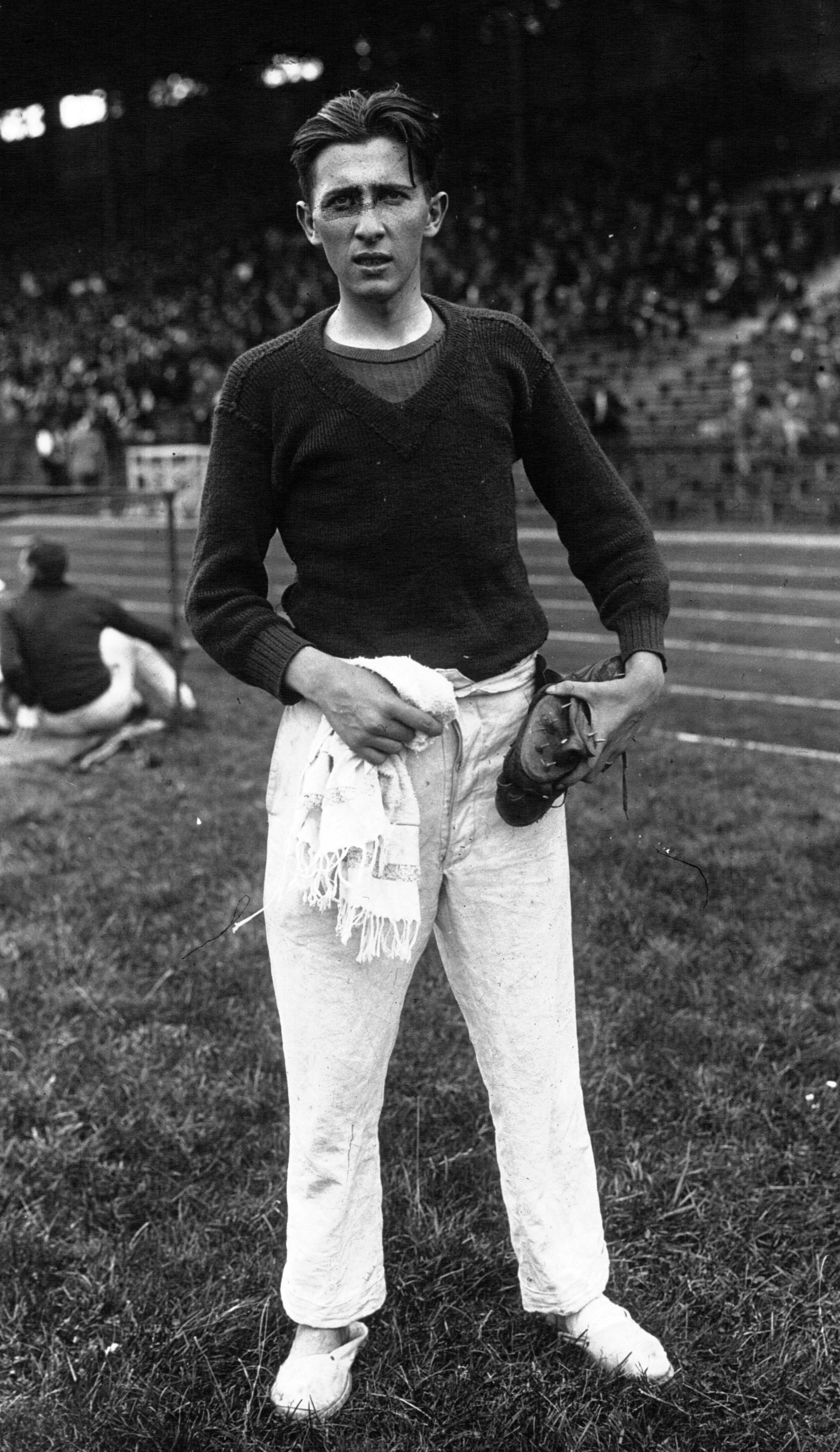
- Claude Ménard in 1926

Personal information
- Born: 14 November 1906 Montrésor, France
- Died: 2 September 1980 (aged 73) Amboise, France
- Height: 1.80 m (5 ft 11 in)
- Weight: 59 kg (130 lb)

Sport
- Sport: Athletics
- Event: High jump
- Club: Stade Français, Paris; Individuel Touraine

Achievements and titles
- Personal best: 1.92 m (1928)
Medal record
Representing France
Olympic Games
Bronze medal – third place	1928 Amsterdam	High jump

Arsène Claude Ménard (14 November 1906 – 2 September 1980) was a French high jumper who competed at the 1928 Summer Olympics.

== Career ==
Ménard won the British AAA Championships title in the high jump event at the 1928 AAA Championships. Shortly afterwards he represented France at the 1928 Olympic Games in Amsterdam, Netherlands, where he won a bronze medal, with a jump of 1.91 m (6 ft 3 in).

He achieved his personal best of 1.92 m (6 ft 3 1/2 in) that same year in Dairen.
