= Athletics at the 1928 Summer Olympics – Men's 4 × 400 metres relay =

Men's 4 × 400 metres relay at the Games of the IX Olympiad
- Venue: Olympic Stadium
- Dates: August 4, 1928 (heats); August 5, 1928 (final)
- Competitors: from 14 nations
- Teams: 14
- Winning time: 3:14.2

Medalists
1st place, gold medalist(s)		George Baird; Fred Alderman; Emerson Spencer; Ray Barbuti	United States
2nd place, silver medalist(s)		Otto Neumann; Harry Werner Storz; Richard Krebs; Hermann Engelhard	Germany
3rd place, bronze medalist(s)		James Ball; Stanley Glover; Phil Edwards; Alex Wilson	Canada

The men's 4 × 400 metres relay event at the 1928 Olympic Games took place between August 4 and August 5.

== Results ==
=== Heats ===
Heat 1

Rank	Country	Time	Athletes	Notes
1	United States	3:21.4	George Baird, Emerson Spencer, Fred Alderman, Ray Barbuti	Q
2	Canada	3:22.0	Alex Wilson, Phil Edwards, Stan Glover, Jimmy Ball	Q
3	Hungary	3:23.2	Mór Gerő, László Magdics, László Barsi, Antal Odri	
4	Poland	3:24.2	Feliks Malanowski, Zygmunt Weiss, Stefan Kostrzewski, Klemens Biniakowski	
5	Belgium		Philippe Coenjaerts, Émile Vercken, François Prinsen, Émile Langenraedt	

Key: Q = Qualified

Heat 2

Rank	Country	Time	Athletes	Notes
1	Germany	3:20.8	Otto Neumann, Richard Krebs, Harry Storz, Hermann Engelhard	Q
2	Sweden	3:21.2	Björn Kugelberg, Bertil von Wachenfeldt, Erik Byléhn, Sten Pettersson	Q
3	Italy	3:22.6	Giacomo Carlini, Luigi Facelli, Guido Cominotto, Ettore Tavernari	
4	Netherlands		Andries Hoogerwerf, Adje Paulen, Harry Broos, Rinus van den Berge	
5	Czechoslovakia		Johann Bartl, Karel Kněnický, Vilém Šindler, Jaroslav Vykoupil	
6	Greece		Stelios Benardis, Renos Frangoudis, Vangelis Moiropoulos, Vasilios Stavrinos	

Key: Q = Qualified

Heat 3

Rank	Country	Time	Athletes	Notes
1	Great Britain	3:20.6	Roger Leigh-Wood, William Craner, John Rinkel, Douglas Lowe	Q
2	France	3:23.0	Georges Krotoff, Joseph Jackson, Georges Dupont, René Féger	Q
3	Mexico	3:23.4	Alfonso García, José Lucílo Iturbe, Jesús Moraila, Víctor Villaseñor	

Key: Q = Qualified

=== Final ===
Rank	Country	Time	Notes
1st place, gold medalist(s)	United States	3:14.2	WR
2nd place, silver medalist(s)	Germany	3:14.8	
3rd place, bronze medalist(s)	Canada	3:15.4	
4	Sweden	3:15.8	
5	Great Britain	3:16.4	
6	France	3:19.4	

Key: WR = World record
