= Athletics at the 1928 Summer Olympics – Men's 400 metres =

Men's 400 metres at the Games of the IX Olympiad
- Venue: Olympic Stadium
- Dates: August 2, 1928 (heats, quarter-finals); August 3, 1928 (semi-finals, final)
- Competitors: 50 from 20 nations
- Winning time: 47.8

Medalists
1st place, gold medalist(s)		Ray Barbuti	United States
2nd place, silver medalist(s)		Jimmy Ball	Canada
3rd place, bronze medalist(s)		Joachim Büchner	Germany

The men's 400 metres was an event at the 1928 Summer Olympics in Amsterdam. Fifty athletes from 20 nations competed. NOCs were limited to 4 competitors each. The event was won by Ray Barbuti of the United States, the first title for the Americans in the event since 1912 and the fifth overall. Jimmy Ball won Canada's first medal in the event, a silver.

== Background ==
This was the eighth appearance of the event, which is one of 12 athletics events to have been held at every Summer Olympics.

None of the finalists from 1924 returned. The world record holder, Emerson Spencer, came in fifth at the U.S. Olympic trials and missed the team. Ray Barbuti won the U.S. trials.

Chile and Greece appeared in the event for the first time. The United States made its eighth appearance in the event, the only nation to compete in it at every Olympic Games to that point.

== Competition format ==
The competition retained the basic four-round format from 1920. The first round had 15 heats, ranging from 2 to 5 athletes. The top two runners in each heat advanced to the quarterfinals. There were 6 quarterfinals of 5 runners each; the top two athletes in each quarterfinal heat advanced to the semifinals. The semifinals featured 2 heats of 6 runners each. The top two runners in each semifinal heat advanced, making a six-man final.

== Records ==
These were the standing world and Olympic records (in seconds) prior to the 1924 Summer Olympics.

World record	Emerson Spencer (USA)	47.0	Palo Alto, United States	12 May 1928
Olympic record	Eric Liddell (GBR)	47.6	Paris, France	11 July 1924

No records were set during this event.

== Schedule ==
Date	Time	Round
Thursday, 2 August 1928	14:00; 16:00	Heats; Quarterfinals
Friday, 3 August 1928	14:00; 16:00	Semifinals; Final

== Results ==
=== Round 1 ===
The top two finishers in each of the 15 heats advanced to the quarterfinals.

==== Heat 1 ====
Rank	Athlete	Nation	Time	Notes
1	Hermon Phillips	United States	49.4	Q
2	Georges Dupont	France	Unknown	Q
3	Zygmunt Weiss	Poland	50.8	
4	Rinus van den Berge	Netherlands	Unknown	
5	Víctor Villaseñor	Mexico	Unknown	

==== Heat 2 ====
Rank	Athlete	Nation	Time	Notes
1	Emil Snider	United States	50.4	Q
2	François Prinsen	Belgium	Unknown	Q

==== Heat 3 ====
Rank	Athlete	Nation	Time	Notes
1	Phil Edwards	Canada	49.8	Q
2	Georges Krotoff	France	50.5	Q
3	Jaroslav Vykoupil	Czechoslovakia	Unknown	
4	Stefan Kostrzewski	Poland	52.2	

==== Heat 4 ====
Rank	Athlete	Nation	Time	Notes
1	John Rinkel	Great Britain	50.2	Q
2	Johann Bartl	Czechoslovakia	Unknown	Q
3	Émile Langenraedt	Belgium	Unknown	
4	Feliks Żuber	Poland	52.6	

==== Heat 5 ====
Rank	Athlete	Nation	Time	Notes
1	Jochen Büchner	Germany	50.2	Q
2	Andries Hoogerwerf	Netherlands	Unknown	Q

==== Heat 6 ====
Rank	Athlete	Nation	Time	Notes
1	Ray Barbuti	United States	49.8	Q
2	Sean Lavan	Ireland	Unknown	Q
3	Louis Lundgren	Denmark	Unknown	
4	Jenő Szalay	Hungary	Unknown	
5	Rudolfo Hannig	Chile	Unknown	

==== Heat 7 ====
Rank	Athlete	Nation	Time	Notes
1	Harry Storz	Germany	50.6	Q
2	Harry Broos	Netherlands	Unknown	Q
3	Joaquín Miquel	Spain	Unknown	

==== Heat 8 ====
Rank	Athlete	Nation	Time	Notes
1	Jimmy Ball	Canada	55.8	Q
2	Roger Leigh-Wood	Great Britain	Unknown	Q

==== Heat 9 ====
Rank	Athlete	Nation	Time	Notes
1	Jesús Moraila	Mexico	1:00.0	Q
2	James Hall	India	Unknown	Q

==== Heat 10 ====
Rank	Athlete	Nation	Time	Notes
1	László Barsi	Hungary	55.6	Q
2	José Lucílo Iturbe	Mexico	Unknown	Q

==== Heat 11 ====
Rank	Athlete	Nation	Time	Notes
1	Joe Tierney	United States	49.8	Q
2	Alex Wilson	Canada	49.9	Q
3	Klemens Biniakowski	Poland	50.8	

==== Heat 12 ====
Rank	Athlete	Nation	Time	Notes
1	René Féger	France	51.4	Q
2	Billy Green	Great Britain	Unknown	Q
3	José Vicente Salinas	Chile	Unknown	

==== Heat 13 ====
Rank	Athlete	Nation	Time	Notes
1	Hermann Geißler	Austria	50.2	Q
2	Adje Paulen	Netherlands	Unknown	Q
3	László Magdics	Hungary	Unknown	
4	Vasilios Stavrinos	Greece	Unknown	
5	Fritz Eyschen	Luxembourg	Unknown	

==== Heat 14 ====
Rank	Athlete	Nation	Time	Notes
1	Otto Neumann	Germany	50.6	Q
2	Fred Macbeth	Canada	Unknown	Q
3	Charles Stuart	Australia	Unknown	
4	Mór Gerő	Hungary	Unknown	

==== Heat 15 ====
Rank	Athlete	Nation	Time	Notes
1	Reinhold Schmidt	Germany	50.0	Q
2	Joseph Jackson	France	50.6	Q
3	John Hanlon	Great Britain	Unknown	
4	Alfonso García	Mexico	Unknown	

=== Quarterfinals ===
The first two finishers in each of the six heats advanced to the semifinal round.

==== Quarterfinal 1 ====
Rank	Athlete	Nation	Time	Notes
1	Hermon Phillips	United States	49.6	Q
2	Georges Krotoff	France	Unknown	Q
3	Billy Green	Great Britain	Unknown	
4	Reinhold Schmidt	Germany	Unknown	
5	James Hall	India	Unknown	

==== Quarterfinal 2 ====
Rank	Athlete	Nation	Time	Notes
1	Ray Barbuti	United States	48.8	Q
2	Alex Wilson	Canada	Unknown	Q
3	Otto Neumann	Germany	Unknown	
4	Georges Dupont	France	Unknown	
5	Jesús Moraila	Mexico	Unknown	

==== Quarterfinal 3 ====
Rank	Athlete	Nation	Time	Notes
1	Jimmy Ball	Canada	49.2	Q
2	René Féger	France	Unknown	Q
3	Euil Snider	United States	Unknown	
4	Andries Hoogerwerf	Netherlands	Unknown	
5	Hermann Geißler	Austria	Unknown	

==== Quarterfinal 4 ====
Rank	Athlete	Nation	Time	Notes
1	Harry Storz	Germany	49.4	Q
2	John Rinkel	Great Britain	Unknown	Q
3	Joseph Jackson	France	Unknown	
4	François Prinsen	Belgium	Unknown	
5	José Lucílo Iturbe	Mexico	Unknown	

==== Quarterfinal 5 ====
Rank	Athlete	Nation	Time	Notes
1	Phil Edwards	Canada	49.2	Q
2	Harry Broos	Netherlands	Unknown	Q
3	Johann Bartl	Czechoslovakia	Unknown	
4	Joe Tierney	United States	Unknown	
5	Sean Lavan	Ireland	Unknown	

==== Quarterfinal 6 ====
Rank	Athlete	Nation	Time	Notes
1	Joachim Büchner	Germany	48.6	Q
2	László Barsi	Hungary	Unknown	Q
3	Roger Leigh-Wood	Great Britain	Unknown	
4	Adje Paulen	Netherlands	Unknown	
5	Fred Macbeth	Canada	Unknown	

=== Semifinals ===
The first three finishers in each of the two heats advanced to the final.

==== Semifinal 1 ====
Rank	Athlete	Nation	Time	Notes
1	Jimmy Ball	Canada	48.6	Q
2	Ray Barbuti	United States	48.8	Q
3	Harry Werner Storz	Germany	49.0	Q
4	László Barsi	Hungary	49.2	
5	Harry Broos	Netherlands	49.9	
6	Georges Krotoff	France	Unknown	

==== Semifinal 2 ====
Rank	Athlete	Nation	Time	Notes
1	Joachim Büchner	Germany	48.6	Q
2	Hermon Phillips	United States	49.1	Q
3	John Rinkel	Great Britain	49.1	Q
4	Alex Wilson	Canada	49.2	
5	René Féger	France	49.6	
6	Phil Edwards	Canada	50.2	

=== Final ===
Rank	Athlete	Nation	Time
1st place, gold medalist(s)	Ray Barbuti	United States	47.8
2nd place, silver medalist(s)	Jimmy Ball	Canada	48.0
3rd place, bronze medalist(s)	Joachim Buchner	Germany	48.2
4	John Rinkel	Great Britain	48.4
5	Harry Werner Storz	Germany	48.8
6	Hermon Phillips	United States	49.0
