= Mexico at the 1928 Summer Olympics =

- IOC code: MEX
- NOC: Mexican Olympic Committee

in Amsterdam
- Competitors: 30 in 6 sports
- Flag bearer: Jesús Aguirre
- Medals: Gold 0 Silver 0 Bronze 0 Total 0

Summer Olympics appearances (overview)
- 1900; 1904–1920; 1924; 1928; 1932; 1936; 1948; 1952; 1956; 1960; 1964; 1968; 1972; 1976; 1980; 1984; 1988; 1992; 1996; 2000; 2004; 2008; 2012; 2016; 2020; 2024

Mexico competed at the 1928 Summer Olympics in Amsterdam, Netherlands. 30 competitors, all men, took part in 18 events in 6 sports.

== Athletics ==
Key

- Note–Ranks given for track events are within the athlete's heat only
- Q = Qualified for the next round
- q = Qualified for the next round as a fastest loser or, in field events, by position without achieving the qualifying target
- NR = National record
- N/A = Round not applicable for the event
- Bye = Athlete not required to compete in round

Track & road events

Athlete	Event	Heat		Quarterfinal		Semifinal		Final	
Athlete	Event	Result	Rank	Result	Rank	Result	Rank	Result	Rank
Francisco Costas	100 m	Unknown	4	did not advance					
Mario Gómez	100 m	Unknown	4	did not advance					
Jesús Moraila	100 m	Unknown	3	did not advance					
Francisco Costas	200 m	Unknown	6	did not advance					
Mario Gómez	200 m	22.5	2 Q	Unknown	2 Q	22.3	5	did not advance	
Alfonso García	400 m	Unknown	4	did not advance					
José Lucílo Iturbe	400 m	Unknown	2 Q	Unknown	5	did not advance			
Jesús Moraila	400 m	1:00.0	1 Q	Unknown	5	did not advance			
Víctor Villaseñor	400 m	Unknown	5	did not advance					
Alfonso García	800 m	Unknown	5	—N/a		did not advance			
José Lucílo Iturbe	800 m	Unknown	5	—N/a		did not advance			
Ciro Chapa	1500 m	did not start		—N/a				did not advance	
Ciro Chapa	5000 m	did not finish		—N/a				did not advance	
Alfonso García; José Lucílo Iturbe; Jesús Moraila; Víctor Villaseñor	4 x 400 metres relay	3:23.4	3	—N/a				did not advance	
Aurelio Terrazas	Marathon	—N/a						2:52:22	32
José Torres	Marathon	—N/a						2:54:00	35

Field events

Athlete	Event	Qualification		Final	
Athlete	Event	Distance	Position	Distance	Position
Francisco Costas	Men's high jump	did not start		did not advance	
Alfonso de Gortari	Men's pole vault	did not start		did not advance	
Alfonso de Gortari	Men's long jump	6.97	16	did not advance	
Jesús Aguirre	Men's shot put	11.33	22	did not advance	
Jesús Aguirre	Men's discus throw	33.21	33	did not advance	
Alfonso de Gortari	Men's discus throw	did not start		did not advance	
Jesús Aguirre	Men's hammer throw	did not start		did not advance	

== Boxing ==
Athlete	Event	Round of 32	Round of 16	Quarterfinals	Semifinals	Final	
Athlete	Event	Opposition Result	Opposition Result	Opposition Result	Opposition Result	Opposition Result	Rank
Alfredo Gaona	Flyweight	Kieffer (LUX); W	Fexis (GRE); W	Cavagnoli (ITA); L	did not advance		5
Fidel Ortiz	Bantamweight	Bye	Tamagnini (ITA); L	did not advance			9
Raúl Talán	Featherweight	Bye	Väkevä (FIN); L	did not advance			9
Carlos Orellana	Lightweight	Bye	Bissett (RHO); L	did not advance			9

== Diving ==
Ranks given are within the heat.

Diver	Event	Semifinals			Final		
Diver	Event	Points	Score	Rank	Points	Score	Rank
Federico Mariscal	3 m springboard	31	81.84	6	did not advance		

== Fencing ==
Athlete	Event	Round 1			Quarterfinals			Semifinals			Final		
Athlete	Event	MW	ML	Rank	MW	ML	Rank	MW	ML	Rank	MW	ML	Rank
Luis Hernández	Men's épée	3	6	7	did not advance								
Pedro Mercado	Men's épée	3	5	5 Q	2	9	12	did not advance					

== Football ==
Summary

Key:

- A.E.T – After extra time.

Team	Event	Prelim.	Round 16	Quarterfinal	Semifinal	Final / BM	
Team	Event	Opposition Score	Opposition Score	Opposition Score	Opposition Score	Opposition Score	Rank
Mexico men's	Men's tournament	Bye	Spain; L 1–7	did not advance			

=== Men's tournament ===
Team roster

Head coach: Alfonso Rojo de la Vega

No.	Pos.	Player	Date of birth (age)	Club
-	GK	Oscar Bonfiglio	5 October 1905 (aged 22)	(Mexican Football Federation) Marte FC
-	FW	Juan Carreño	14 August 1907 (aged 20)	(Mexican Football Federation) Atlante F.C.
-	DF	Hesiquio Cerilla		(Mexican Football Federation) Club América
-	MF	Luis Cerrilla	1 February 1906 (aged 22)	(Mexican Football Federation) Club América
-	FW	Benito Contreras	16 May 1905 (aged 23)	(Mexican Football Federation) Club América
-	GK	Ignacio De La Garza		(Mexican Football Federation) Club América
-	FW	Carlos Garcés	24 December 1900 (aged 27)	(Mexican Football Federation) Club América
-	MF	Emmanuel Guevara	2 February 1902 (aged 26)	(Mexican Football Federation) Deportivo Mexico
-	DF	Rafael Garza Gutiérrez	13 December 1896 (aged 31)	(Mexican Football Federation) Club América
-	MF	Nieves Hernandez	30 October 1901 (aged 26)	(Mexican Football Federation) Club América
-	FW	Adeodato López	1 February 1906 (aged 22)	(Mexican Football Federation) Germania FV
-	FW	Dionisio Mejía	6 January 1907 (aged 21)	(Mexican Football Federation) Atlante F.C.
-	DF	Agustín Ojeda	9 September 1898 (aged 29)	(Mexican Football Federation) Marte FC
-	MF	Fernando Rojas		(Mexican Football Federation) Atlante F.C.
-	FW	Ernesto Sota	11 December 1896 (aged 31)	(Mexican Football Federation) Club América
-	MF	Pedro Suinaga	5 April 1907 (aged 21)	(Mexican Football Federation) Club América
-	FW	Juan Terrazas	5 December 1909 (aged 18)	(Mexican Football Federation) Club América

Round of 16

30 May 1928
14:00

Spain	7–1	Mexico
Regueiro 13', 27'; Yermo 43', 63', 85'; Marculeta 66'; Mariscal 70'	Report	Carreño 76'

Nederlandsch Sportpark, Amsterdam
Attendance: 2,344
Referee: Gabor Boronkay (Hungary)

Consolation tournament, First Round

5 June 1928
14:00

Chile	3–1	Mexico
Subiabre 24', 48', 89'	Report	Sota 15'

Monnikenhuize, Arnhem
Attendance: 5,000
Referee: Johannes Mutters (Netherlands)

== Art competitions ==
Art competitions were part of the Olympic program from 1912 to 1948, but were discontinued due to concerns about amateurism and professionalism.

Competitor	Event	Title	Rank
Ángel Zárraga	Painting	Le But dégagé	Unknown
Ángel Zárraga	Painting	Portrait d'un Footballeur	Unknown
Ángel Zárraga	Painting	Footballeuse blonde	Unknown
Ángel Zárraga	Painting	Footballeuse brune	Unknown
Ángel Zárraga	Painting	Heading	Unknown
Ángel Zárraga	Painting	Footballeur en action	Unknown
Ángel Zárraga	Painting	Joueur nègre	Unknown
Ángel Zárraga	Painting	Plaquage	Unknown
Ángel Zárraga	Painting	Une touche	Unknown
Ángel Zárraga	Painting	Scène de rugby	Unknown
Ángel Zárraga	Painting	Le Ballon	Unknown
Ángel Zárraga	Painting	Athlètes	Unknown
Ángel Zárraga	Painting	La Passe	Unknown
Ángel Zárraga	Painting	Le Départ	Unknown
Ángel Zárraga	Painting	Scène de rugby	Unknown
Ángel Zárraga	Painting	Une touche	Unknown
