= Athletics at the 1926 Central American and Caribbean Games =

The athletics competition in the 1926 Central American and Caribbean Games were held in Mexico City, Mexico.

== Medal summary ==
=== Men's events ===
Event	Gold		Silver		Bronze	
100 metres	Mariano Aguilar; Mexico	11.1A	Francisco Ramírez; Mexico		Mario González; Cuba	
200 metres	Mario Gómez; Mexico	22.2A	Armando "Pepe" Barrientos; Cuba		Francisco Arango; Cuba	
400 metres	Luciano Iturbe; Mexico	49.9A	Luis Estévez; Cuba		José Moraila; Mexico	
800 metres	Luciano Iturbe; Mexico	2:01.4A	Modesto Careaga; Mexico		Darío Álvarez; Cuba	
1500 metres	Modesto Careaga; Mexico	4:22.6A	Francisco Terrazas; Mexico		José Eslava; Mexico	
5000 metres	Eduardo Quintanar; Mexico	17:16.6A	Juan Cortés; Mexico		José Eslava; Mexico	
10,000 metres	Eduardo Quintanar; Mexico	36:02.4A	M.M. Hernández; Mexico		José Nevares; Mexico	
10,000 metres	Tomás Zafiro; Mexico	36:05A	Juventino Guzmán; Mexico		Madardo Sánchez; Mexico	
110 metres hurdles	Armando Díaz; Mexico	16.4A	José Sorzano; Cuba		Dionisio Fuentefría; Cuba	
400 metres hurdles	Armando Díaz; Mexico	57.8A	José María Suárez; Cuba		Ernesto Estévez; Cuba	
4 × 100 metres relay	Mexico; Herminio Ahumada; Mario Gómez; Francisco Ramírez; Mariano Aguilar	43.6A	Cuba; Mario González; Calixto García; Otilio Campuzano; Francisco Arango		Guatemala; Gonzalo Palarea; Ángel Herrera; Víctor Granai; Manuel Padilla	
4 × 400 metres relay	Mexico; Alfonso García; Carlos García; Jesús Moraila; Lucílo Iturbe	3:25.6A	Cuba; Mario González; Francisco Arango; Arturo Ojeda; Luis Estévez		Guatemala; Ángel Herrera; Fernando Murúa; Enrique Asturias; Gonzalo Palarea	
High jump	Alfonso Stoopen; Mexico	1.77A	Francisco Costas; Mexico	1.75A	Juan Alonso; Cuba	1.75A
Pole vault	José Sanjurjo; Cuba	3.43A	Fernando Álvarez; Cuba	3.43A	Juan Figueroa; Mexico	3.38A
Long jump	Alfonso de Gortari; Mexico	6.70A	José Torriente; Cuba	6.53A	Carlos Carranza; Mexico	6.46A
Triple jump	Sergio Macías; Cuba	13.29A	Manuel Montes; Cuba	13.13A	Armando Díaz; Mexico	13.09A
Shot put	Pedro Rodríguez; Cuba	11.65A	Jesús Aguirre; Mexico	11.30A	Ricardo Villar; Cuba	11.30A
Discus throw	Manuel Guzmán; Mexico	35.79A	Miguel Gutiérrez; Cuba	35.46A	Jesús Aguirre; Mexico	34.43A
Hammer throw	Troadio Hernández; Cuba	36.07A	Abel Salazar; Mexico	35.73A	Jesús Aguirre; Mexico	35.43A
Javelin throw	Luis Lewis; Cuba	52.15A	Luis Estévez; Cuba	48.34A	Gustavo Gallardo; Mexico	45.18A

== Medal table ==
Rank	Nation	Gold	Silver	Bronze	Total
1	Mexico (MEX)	15	9	11	35
2	Cuba (CUB)	5	11	7	23
3	Guatemala (GUA)	0	0	2	2
Totals (3 entries)		20	20	20	60
