= Athletics at the 1930 British Empire Games – Men's 4 × 440 yards relay =

Men's 4 × 440 yards relay at the Commonwealth Games

The men's 4 × 440 yards relay event at the 1930 British Empire Games was held on 23 August at the Civic Stadium in Hamilton, Canada.

== Results ==
Rank	Nation	Athletes	Time	Notes
1st place, gold medalist(s)	England	Roger Leigh-Wood, Stuart Townend, David Burghley, Kenneth Brangwin	3:19.4	
2nd place, silver medalist(s)	Canada	Art Scott, Stanley Glover, Jimmy Ball, Alex Wilson	3:19.8e	
3rd place, bronze medalist(s)	South Africa	John Chandler, Wilfred Legg, Werner Gerhardt, Willie Walters	?:??.?	
