= Men's 4 × 400 metres relay world record progression =

The first world record in the 4 × 400 metres for men (athletics) was recognized by the International Amateur Athletics Federation, now known as the International Association of Athletics Federations, in 1912. The IAAF's first record in the event was for a mark set the year before the organization's formation. The men's record has been almost exclusively set by American teams, with one exception by one Jamaican team. To June 21, 2009, the IAAF has ratified 15 world records in the event.

== Records 1912–present ==
The following table shows the world record progression in the men's 4 × 400 metre relay, as ratified by the IAAF. "y" denotes time for 4 × 440 yards (1609 m), ratified as a record for this event.

Time	Auto	Team	Nationality	Location of race	Date	Competition	Participants
3:18.2 y		Irish-American AC	United States	New York City, USA	1911-09-04		Harry Schaaf, Mel Sheppard, Harry Gissing, James Rosenberger
3:16.6		United States	United States	Stockholm, Sweden	1912-06-15		Mel Sheppard, Charles Reidpath, Ted Meredith, Edward Lindberg
3:16.0		United States	United States	Paris, France	1924-07-13		Commodore Cochran, Alan Helffrich, Oliver MacDonald, William Stevenson
3:14.2		United States	United States	Amsterdam, Netherlands	1928-08-05		George Baird, Emerson Spencer, Fred Alderman, Ray Barbuti
3:13.4 y		United States	United States	London, UK	1928-08-11		George Baird, Morgan Taylor, Ray Barbuti, Emerson Spencer
3:12.6 y		Stanford University	United States	Fresno, USA	1931-05-08		Maynor Shore, Alvin Hables, Leslie Hables, Ben Eastman
3:08.2	3:08.14	United States	United States	Los Angeles, USA	1932-08-07		Ivan Fuqua, Ed Ablowich, Karl Warner, Bill Carr
3:03.9	3:04.04	Jamaica	Jamaica	Helsinki, Finland	1952-07-27		Arthur Wint, Leslie Laing, Herb McKenley, George Rhoden
3:02.2	3:02.37	United States	United States	Rome, Italy	1960-09-08		Jack Yerman, Earl Young, Glenn Davis, Otis Davis
3:00.7		United States	United States	Tokyo, Japan	1964-10-21		Ollan Cassell, Mike Larrabee, Ulis Williams, Henry Carr
2:59.6		United States	United States	Los Angeles, USA	1966-07-24		Robert Frey, Lee Evans, Tommie Smith, Theron Lewis
2:56.2	2:56.16	United States	United States	Mexico City, Mexico	1968-10-20		Vincent Matthews, Ron Freeman, Larry James, Lee Evans
2:56.16	-	United States	United States	Seoul, South Korea	1988-10-01		Danny Everett, Steve Lewis, Kevin Robinzine, Butch Reynolds
2:55.74	-	United States	United States	Barcelona, Spain	1992-08-08		Andrew Valmon, Quincy Watts, Michael Johnson, Steve Lewis
2:54.29	-	United States	United States	Stuttgart, Germany	1993-08-22		Andrew Valmon, Quincy Watts, Butch Reynolds, Michael Johnson
2:54.20 (Note: This time was rescinded by the IAAF on 12 August 2008 after relay team member Antonio Pettigrew admitted to using human growth hormone and EPO between 1997 and 2003.)	-	United States	United States	Uniondale, New York	1998-07-22		Jerome Young, Antonio Pettigrew, Tyree Washington, Michael Johnson
