= Athletics at the 1930 British Empire Games – Men's 440 yards hurdles =

Men's 440 yards hurdles at the Commonwealth Games

The men's 440 yards hurdles event at the 1930 British Empire Games was held on 17 August at the Civic Stadium in Hamilton, Canada.

== Medalists ==
Gold	Silver	Bronze
David Burghley; England	Roger Leigh-Wood; England	Douglas Neame; England

== Results ==
=== Heats ===
Qualification: First 3 in each heat (Q) qualify directly for the final.

Rank	Heat	Name	Nationality	Time	Notes
1	1	David Burghley	England	58.0	Q
2	1	Wilfrid Tatham	England	??.?	Q
3	1	John Hickey	Canada	??.?	Q
?	1	George Golding	Australia	??.?	
?	1	Fred Macbeth	Canada	??.?	
?	1	Johannes Viljoen	South Africa	??.?	
1	2	Roger Leigh-Wood	England	58.3	Q
2	2	Walter Connolly	Canada	??.?	Q
3	2	Douglas Neame	England	??.?	Q
?	2	Harry Hart	South Africa	??.?	
?	2	Howard Davies	South Africa	??.?	

=== Final ===
Rank	Name	Nationality	Time	Notes
1st place, gold medalist(s)	David Burghley	England	54.4	
2nd place, silver medalist(s)	Roger Leigh-Wood	England	55.9e	+12 yd
3rd place, bronze medalist(s)	Douglas Neame	England	??.?	
4	Wilfrid Tatham	England	??.?	
5	Walter Connolly	Canada	??.?	
6	John Hickey	Canada	??.?	
