= Hermann Engelhard =

German middle-distance runner

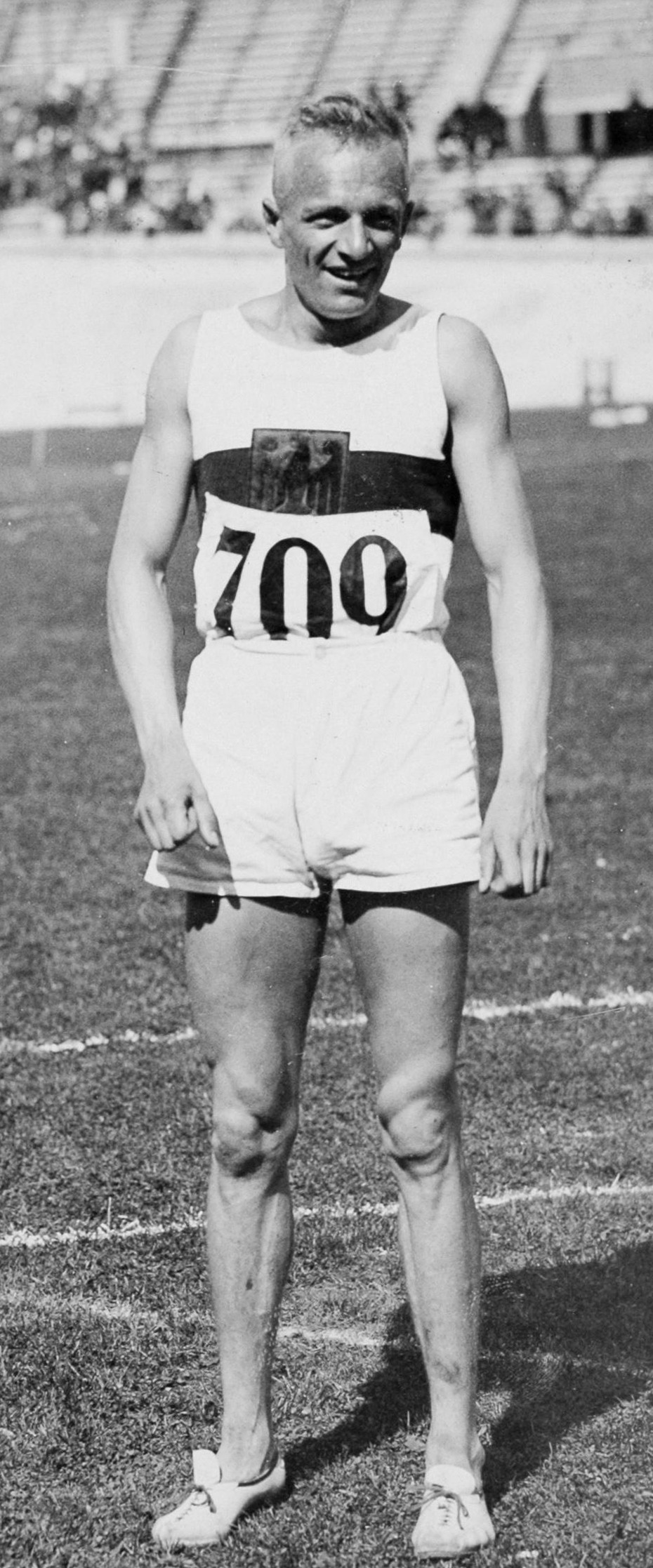
- Hermann Engelhard at the 1928 Olympics

Personal information
- Born: 21 June 1903 Darmstadt, German Empire
- Died: 6 January 1984 (aged 80) Darmstadt, West Germany
- Height: 1.76 m (5 ft 9 in)
- Weight: 65 kg (143 lb)

Sport
- Sport: Athletics
- Events: 400 m, 800 m
- Club: Darmstadt 98

Achievements and titles
- Personal bests: 400 m – 47.6 (1928); 800 m – 1:51.8 (1928)
Medal record
Representing Germany
Olympics
Silver medal – second place	1928 Amsterdam	4 × 400 m relay
Bronze medal – third place	1928 Amsterdam	800 metres

Hermann Engelhard (21 June 1903 – 6 January 1984) was a German middle-distance runner who won two medals at the 1928 Summer Olympics.

== Career ==
Engelhard finished second behind Douglas Lowe in the 880 yards event at the British 1928 AAA Championships.

Shortly afterwards he represented Germany at the 1928 Olympic Games in Amsterdam, Netherlands, where he won a bronze medal in the 800 meters. He also helped the German team of Otto Neumann, Harry Werner Storz and Richard Krebs to win the silver medal in the 4 × 400 m relay.

After retiring from competitions Engelhard worked as an athletics coach in Württemberg and Hessen, along with his wife. He wrote books Leistungsschulung des Mittelstrecklers (How to coach middle distance runners, 1937) and Der Mittelstreckenlauf (Middle distance running, 1950).

== Family ==
Engelhard's brother Richard was an elite long-distance runner in the 1920s. In 1932 Engelhard married Ruth Engelhard, a German runner who set three world records in the 80 m hurdles and 4 × 200 m relay. Their son Bernd and daughter Petra also became short to middle-distance runners.
