= Ray Barbuti =

American football player and sprint runner (1905–1988)

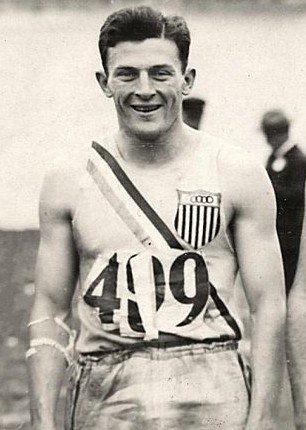

Personal information
- Full name: Raymond James Barbuti
- Born: June 12, 1905 Brooklyn, New York, U.S.
- Died: July 8, 1988 (aged 83) Pittsfield, Massachusetts, U.S.
- Height: 6 ft 0 in (183 cm)
- Weight: 181 lb (82 kg)

Sport
- Sport: Running
- Club: NYAC, New York
Medal record
Athletics
Representing the United States
Olympic Games
Gold medal – first place	1928 Amsterdam	400 metres
Gold medal – first place	1928 Amsterdam	4 × 400 m relay

Raymond James Barbuti (June 12, 1905 – July 8, 1988) was an American football player and sprint runner who won two gold medals at the 1928 Summer Olympics in Amsterdam, Netherlands. Barbuti traveled to Amsterdam to initially only compete for the 400 meter sprint however the US medal position was meek and then US Olympic committee president, Major General Douglas MacArthur insisted after Barbuti won the 400 meter gold that he run in the 4 × 400 meter relay the next day. Barbuti was interrupted by MacArthur during his celebratory evening to start preparing to run the anchor for the event the next day. Barbuti initially, vehemently refused, claiming he would not displace a fellow US runner in search for further medals. However MacArthur was relentless and finally prevailed and history commenced with the team winning the gold.

Raised in Inwood, New York, Barbuti attended Lawrence High School. In 1924, while playing fullback, Barbuti set a New York state high school record, which still stands (2013), scoring eight touchdowns in one game. He attended Syracuse University, where he won the IC4A championship in the 400 m sprint in 1928 in a time of 48.8 seconds. The same year he won the AAU Championship in the 400 m dash in a time of 51.4. He played fullback on the Syracuse football teams of 1926, 1927, and 1928 and was the captain of both the football and athletics teams.

His trainer, Peter Poole, very seldom let him run his two preferred distances, the 200 yd and the 400 yd, in the same competition, so Barbuti chose the 400 m and 4 × 400 m at the 1928 Summer Olympics and won both, setting a world record in the relay at 3:14.2. Next week he set another world record, at 3:13.4 in the 4 × 440 yd relay in London in a match against Great Britain.

During World War II Barbuti served with the US Air Force in the 83rd Bombardment Squadron which was part of the 12th Bombardment Group also known as the Earthquakers. He was awarded the Air Medal and the Bronze Star. While stationed in Gambut, Libya, Barbuti helped to organize the Western Desert Track and Field Championships. The competition was between the 12th Bombardment's track men, members of the RAF, and Australian troops. With Barbuti's talent on the track as a runner and as a coach, the men of the 12th won 1st place in 8 out of 11 events. He retired in the rank of major and became deputy director of the Civil Defense Commission for New York State and director of the New York State Office of Disaster Preparedness. In his spare time he acted as a referee in more than 500 intercollegiate football games.

On December 24, 1957, Barbuti appeared as a "contestant imposter" on the game show To Tell the Truth. This episode is still in existence and was most recently aired by GSN on January 20, 2009. The host was Bud Collyer and the panel consisted of Betsy Palmer, Don Ameche, Kitty Carlisle and Hy Gardner.

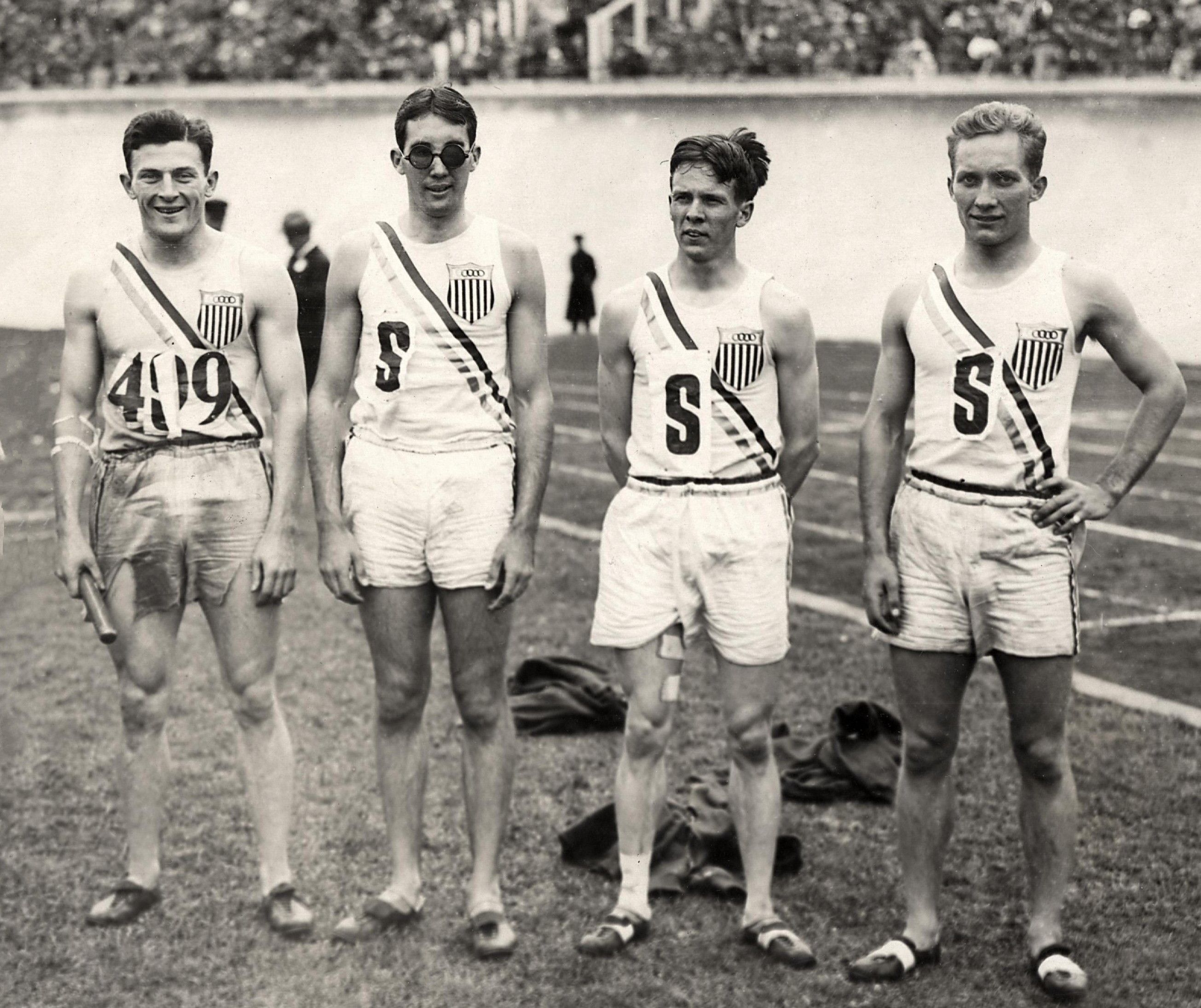
Ray Barbuti, Emerson Spencer, Fred Alderman and George Baird at the 1928 Olympics

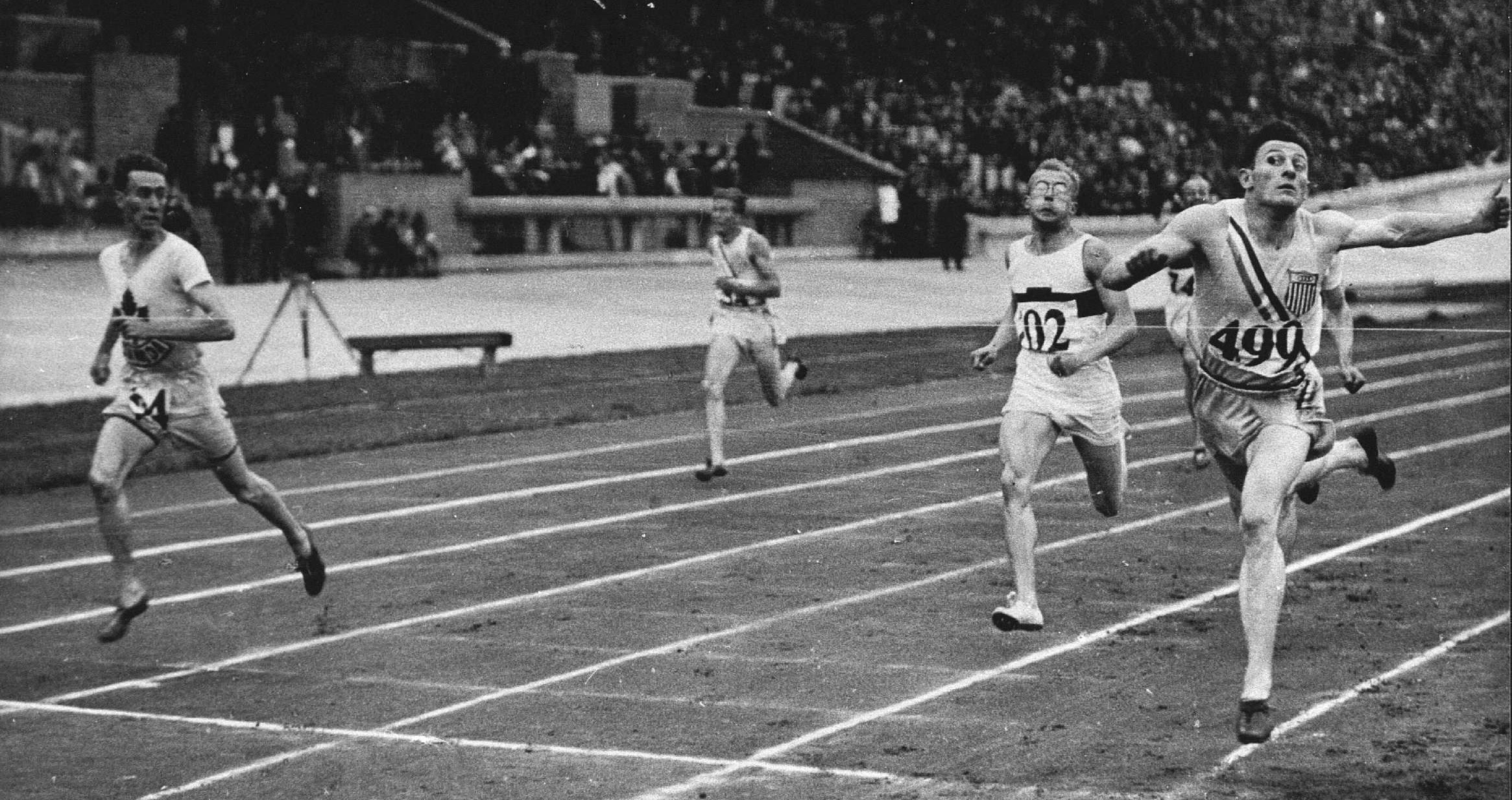
Barbuti (right) winning the 400 m event at the 1928 Olympics
