= Stanley Glover =

Canadian athletics competitor

Medal record

Men's athletics

Representing Canada

Olympic Games
Bronze medal – third place	1928 Amsterdam	4x400 m relay

British Empire Games
Silver medal – second place	1930 Hamilton	4×440 yd relay

Stanley B. Glover (April 18, 1908 – February 23, 1964) was a Canadian athlete who competed in the 1928 Summer Olympics.

He was born in Newcastle-upon-Tyne.

Glover competed for Canada in the 1928 Olympics held in Amsterdam, Netherlands in the 4×400 metre relay where he won the bronze medal with his teammates Alex Wilson, Phil Edwards and Jimmy Ball.

At 1930 Empire Games he won the silver medal with the Canadian team in the 4×440 yards relay event. In the 440 yards competition he was eliminated in the heats.
