= George Baird (sprinter) =

American sprinter

George Baird (athlete)
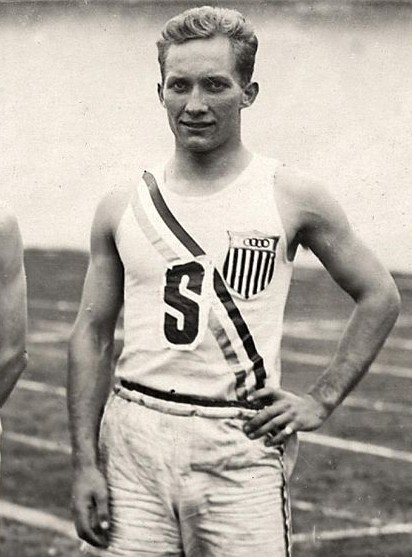
- Baird at the 1928 Olympics

Personal information
- Full name: George Hetzel Baird
- Born: March 5, 1907 Grand Island, Nebraska, United States
- Died: September 4, 2004 (aged 97) Rhinebeck, New York, United States
- Education: University of Iowa ('29, Education); New York University (MA) 1964
- Occupations: Professor of Education, NYU
- Height: 1.75 m (5 ft 9 in)
- Weight: 66 kg (146 lb)
- Spouses: Shirley Sinclair; Dorothea Lawson (1952)
- Children: 2 sons, 1 daughter
- Relatives: Bil Baird, brother Puppeteer

Sport
- Country: USA
- Sport: Track
- Event: 400 m (Quarter mile)
- College team: University of Iowa
- Coached by: George Bresnahan (U. Iowa)
Medal record
Representing the United States
Olympics
Gold medal – first place	1928 Amsterdam	4 × 400 m relay

George Hetzel Baird (March 5, 1907 – September 4, 2004) was an American sprint runner who competed for the University of Iowa, and specialized in the 400 meter run, a distance very close to the quarter mile. He won a gold medal as the leadoff runner in the Men's 4 × 400 m relay at the 1928 Amsterdam Olympics, breaking the relay world record in the process. Baird tried a variety of careers after graduating from the University of Iowa in 1929, which included working at fitness clubs, and as an assistant with his brother Bil's Baird's Marionettes, he later earned a Masters from New York University in 1964. Before retiring from his academic career, he served as a Professor of Education for around two decades at NYU where his courses focused on sports, physical training and coaching.

George Baird was born March 5, 1907 in Grand Island, Nebraska to William Hull Baird and Louise Hetzel Baird. George's father William was a Chemist who oversaw sugarbeet manufacturing facilities. Frequent moves occurred during Geroge's early life, as his father was required to help open manufacturing facilities around America. After a family move, he grew up in Iowa, where he graduated Mason City, Iowa's Mason City High School in 1925. At Mason City High, he captained the track team, and won the state championship in the quarter mile event.

== University of Iowa ==
Baird attended the University of Iowa from 1925-1929 where he competed in track under Head Track Coach George Bresnahan, who led the Iowa track team from 1921-1949. While at the University of Iowa, Baird majored in Education, graduating in 1929. Adept at a variety of distances, George could score in the 50, 75 and 100-yard dashes in collegiate competition. During Baird's tenure with the Iowa track team under Bresnahan, Iowa won the Indoor Big 10 championships in both 1926 and in his Senior year in 1929. By 1928, Baird had won eight consecutive events in dual meets in both outdoor and indoor competition. He held the Big Ten conference quarter mile record by 1928, and was expected to approach a time of 48.1 for the event in the Olympic trials. In his Senior year, he was voted Captain of the Iowa Track Team.

Due to a pulled muscle in March, 1929, Baird was unable to compete in the Spring, 1929 Big Ten Championships.

== 1928 Olympic trials ==
Baird qualified for the 1928 Olympic trials by running the 400 meter event in an Iowa City meet before a large crowd, where he set an American record time of 47.9 seconds, only .5 seconds slower than the standing world record. Though he was cut after the 1928 Olympic trial semi-finals he earned his Olympic berth by placing first in a race held to determine the last two spots on the U.S. 4x400 relay team.

== 1928 Amsterdam Olympics ==
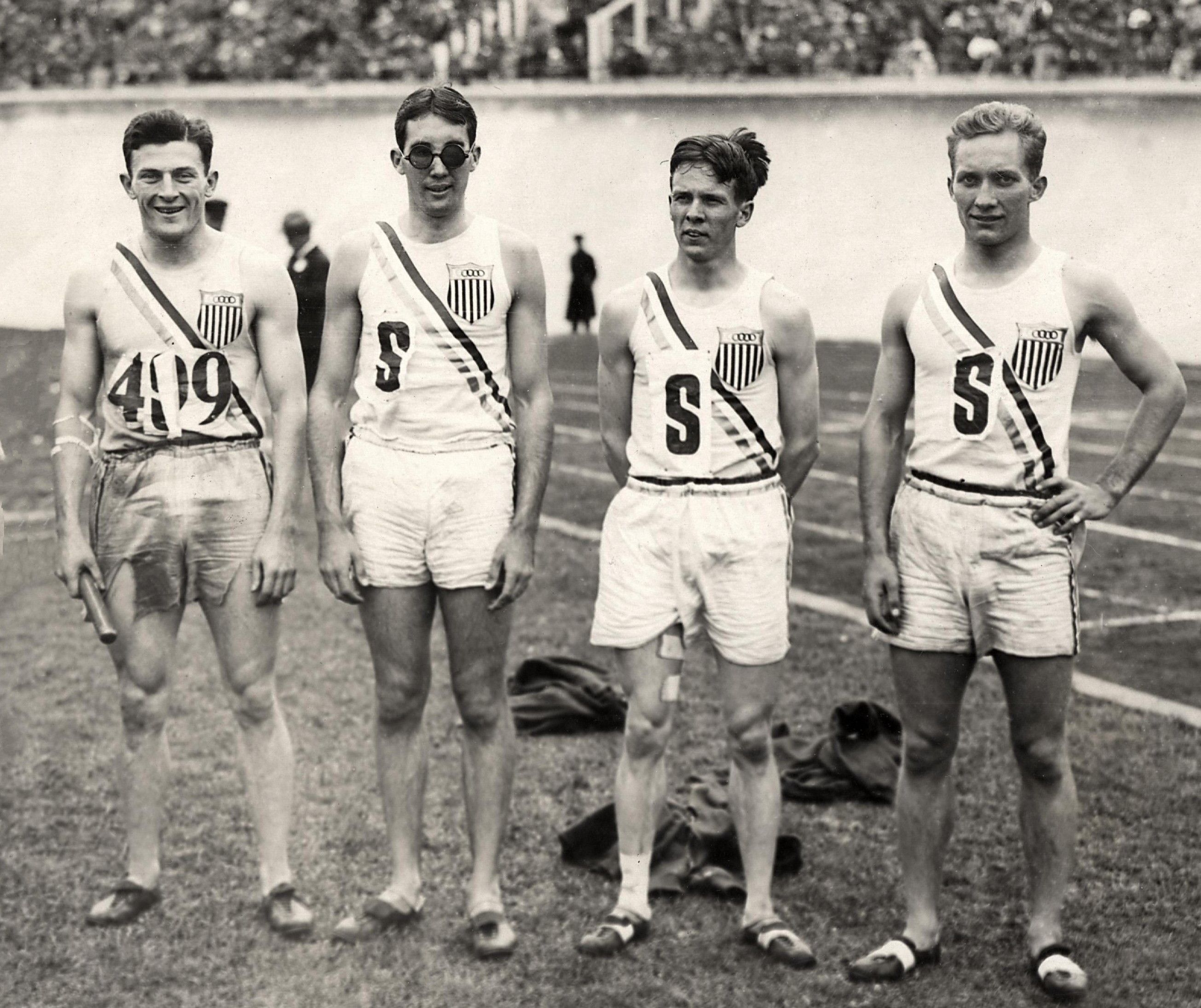
R. Barbuti, E. Spencer, F. Alderman and Baird at 1928 Olympics

On the ship to Amsterdam, Baird met U.S. swimming Olympians Johnny Weismueller and Buster Crabbe, and noted that they had performed in movies. He would later have a career as a performer himself.

In the summer following his Junior year at the University of Iowa, Baird participated in the 1928 Amsterdam Olympics in the Men's 4 × 400 m relay, on August 4-5, where he won a gold medal with the U.S. team, which finished the finals in the combined world record time of 3:14.2. In a close finish, the team from Germany took the silver medal, with a time of 3:14.8, and the team from Canada took the bronze medal with a time of 3:15.4.

As the lead off runner in the 4x400 relay final, Baird helped put the U.S. team in front by three meters, running his leg in a speedy time of 48.8. The American anchor, or fourth place runner, Ray Barbutti lost a little time to the anchor runner from Germany, Hermann Englehard, but the American team was able to hold off the second place German team, winning by .6 of a second. Their 4x400 relay time continued as a world record until the Olympic games in 1932. The 1928 relay team's time of 3:14.2, would not be considered fast by the standards of today but allowances should be made for a number of reasons. In 1928, most races were run on dirt or cinder tracks which were usually considerably slower than today's synthetic tracks, particularly under wet conditions. Cleats weighed as much as 15 ounces, and pierced the track surface to gain traction, often leaving an indentation, reducing the runner's momentum. Despite the considerably faster modern world record set in 1998 of 2:54.20, several track runners have recognized a 3:14.2 as a noteworthy achievement for the conditions faced by Olympic runners in 1928.

A week after the Olympics, Baird helped to set another world record, a combined relay team time of 3:13.4 in the 4 × 440 yard relay in London.

== Careers and education ==
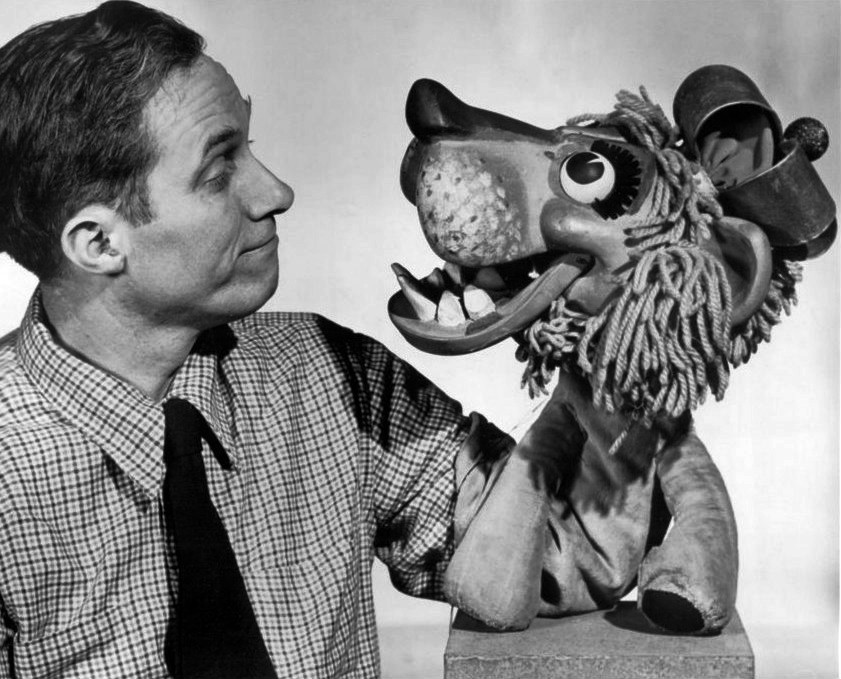
Puppeteer Bil Baird, 1963

After graduating college during the Great Depression's earlier years, he worked a variety of jobs. In an early position, he assisted his brother, well-known marionette artist Bil Baird, as a puppeteer, and worked as a puppeteer's assistant for a number of years. By 1933, George's brother Bil Baird had formed his own successful company, the Baird Marionettes which would perform throughout the U.S., and later produce a few commercials for American corporations. George's work with the Baird Marionettes included performing for live theater, and may have spanned into the 1950's when the company performed for television audiences. Both Baird brothers travelled to India performing with the Baird Marionettes as part of a program for cultural exchange.

Moving to California during the depression years, Baird's many jobs included serving as a movie extra, and working with the Hollywood and Los Angeles Athletic Clubs. His work as an athletics instructor would influence his later role as a Professor at New York University. During the War years, Baird worked in public service with the Civilian corps. During WWII, he served in Camps throughout the United States, where he worked in forestry, logging, building dams, and other government sponsored projects.

=== NYU Professor ===
He later established a career at New York University as an assistant professor of education and completed a Masters Degree at NYU in 1964. In a career of around two decades as a Professor of Education at NYU, he taught courses that included curriculum focusing on physical training, methods for coaching, and sports instruction. Baird remained active in the track and athletic community, and was a member of the Circle of Olympians according to their website. The Circle of Olympians, composed primarily of New Yorkers, campaigned to bring the Olympics to New York City in 2012.

=== Marriages ===
At a ceremony in Somers, New York, Baird married Dorothea Mabel Lawson on September 7, 1952, with the marriage surviving through the remainder of his life. Valuing education, Dorothea was a 1943 graduate of Adelphi College. George had formerly been married to Shirley Sinclair, divorcing in 1951. Dorethea, who died in 2011, had performed secretarial work prior to her marriage to George. Like her husband George, she was dedicated to the philosophy of Theosophy. Theosophy is influenced by Hinduism, Buddhism, and believes life's purpose is the freeing of the spirit and that the soul undergoes reincarnation at death. It stresses brotherhood and social improvement, though it does not have a central dogma to which its followers must conform. It is possible that Bairds early interest in Theosophy may have originated during his trips to India with his brother George, as India houses the theological headquarters of Theosophy in Madras, India, also known as Adyar, Chennai.

In his late life, Baird travelled frequently with his wife Dorothea, perhaps becoming accustomed to changing locations as a result of his early life experiences.

Baird died at 97 at his daughter's home in Hudson Valley in Rhinebeck, New York. He had lived in Armonk, New York for a number of years in his retirement. Prior to the time of his death, he was the oldest living Olympian. He was survived by his wife, the former Dorethea Mabel Lawson, a daughter, two sons, and six grandchildren. Memorial services were held privately, and he was cremated.
