= László Barsi =

László Barsi may refer to:

- László Barsi (runner) (1904–1975), Hungarian sprinter
- László Barsi (weightlifter) (born 1962), Hungarian weightlifter
