= Mario Gómez (athlete) =

Mexican sprinter (1907–1971)

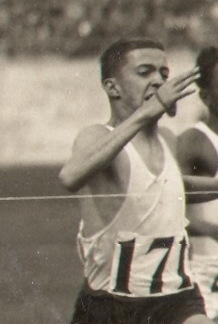

Medal record

Men's athletics

Representing Mexico

Central American and Caribbean Games
Gold medal – first place	1926 Mexico City	200 m
Bronze medal – third place	1930 Havana	200 m

Mario Gómez Daza (19 January 1907 – 14 May 1971) was a Mexican sprinter who competed in the 1928 Summer Olympics. He was born in Mexico City.
