= Joachim Büchner =

German sprinter

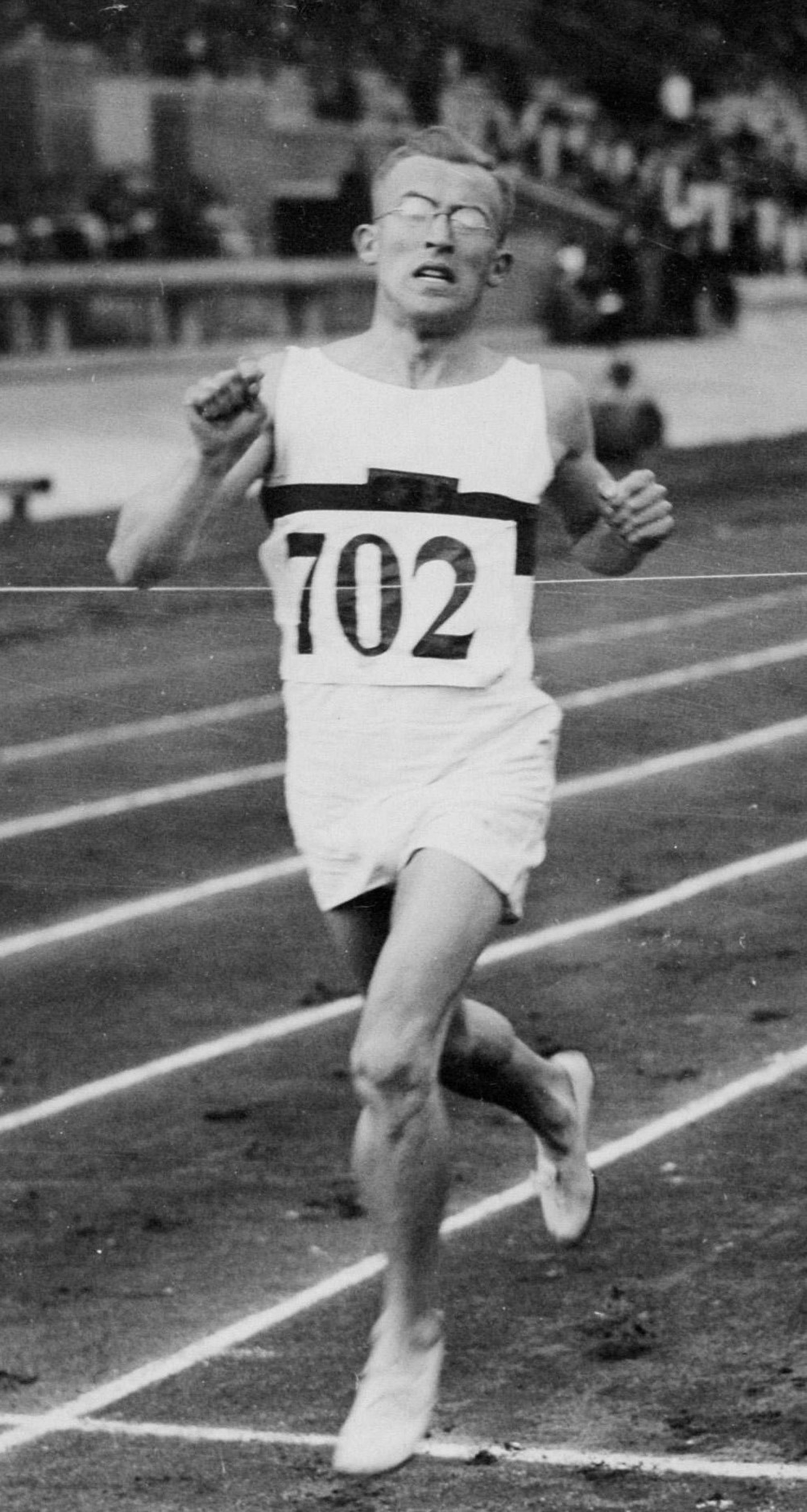
- Joachim Büchner at the 1928 Olympics

Personal information
- Born: 8 April 1905 Altenburg, German Empire
- Died: 22 February 1978 (aged 72) Leverkusen, West Germany
- Height: 1.76 m (5 ft 9 in)
- Weight: 74 kg (163 lb)

Sport
- Sport: Running
- Club: Viktoria Magdeburg; VfB Leipzig

Achievements and titles
- Olympic finals: 1928, 1932
Medal record
Representing Germany
Olympics
| Bronze medal – third place | 1928 Amsterdam | 400 metres |

Joachim Jochen Büchner (8 April 1905 – 22 February 1978) was a German sprint runner who competed at two Olympic Games.

== Career ==
Büchner finished second behind Guy Butler in the 220 yards event at the 1926 AAA Championships.

At the 1928 Summer Olympics in Amsterdam, he won a bronze medal in the 400 metres event. Four years later, he failed to reach the 400 metres final at the next Olympics, and finished in fourth place with the German 4 × 400 m relay team.

He won three national titles in the 400 m in 1927–1929 and finished second in 1925, 1931 and 1932. In 1928 he became the first German athlete to run 400 m within 48 seconds.

Büchner was a graphic designer and advertising consultant. After retiring from competitions, he worked at ASV Köln, first as athletics coach (1947–1950), then treasurer (1962–1969) and later as president (1969–1977). Until his death in 1978 he was a member of the Association of Former Track and Field Athletes of West Germany. Büchner's daughter Christa (born 1931) became a pentathlete.
