= Feliks Malanowski =

Polish sprinter

Personal information
- Nationality: Polish
- Born: 17 May 1906 Płońsk, Congress Poland, Russian Empire
- Died: 5 April 1976 (aged 69)

Sport
- Sport: Sprinting
- Event: 4 × 400 metres relay

Feliks Malanowski (17 May 1906 – 5 April 1976) was a Polish sprinter. He competed in the men's 4 × 400 metres relay at the 1928 Summer Olympics.
