= Jenő Szalay =

Hungarian sprinter

Personal information
- Nationality: Hungarian
- Born: 4 September 1904
- Died: 13 August 1976 (aged 71)

Sport
- Sport: Sprinting
- Event: 400 metres

Jenő Szalay (4 September 1904 – 13 August 1976) was a Hungarian sprinter. He competed in the men's 400 metres at the 1928 Summer Olympics.
