= William Craner =

British sprinter

Walter Craner
Personal information
- Nationality: British
- Born: 17 July 1906
- Died: 12 January 1987 (aged 80)

Sport
- Sport: Sprinting
- Event: 4 × 400 metres relay

William Craner (17 July 1906 – 12 January 1987) was a British sprinter. He competed in the men's 4 × 400 metres relay at the 1928 Summer Olympics.
