= Hermon Phillips =

American sprinter

Hermon Edgar Phillips
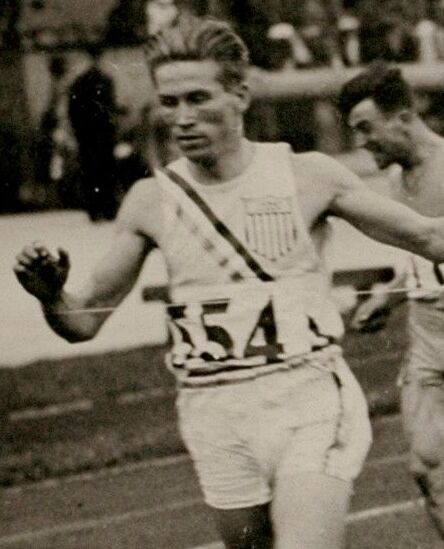

Personal information
- Nationality: American
- Born: August 2, 1903 Rushville, Indiana, United States
- Died: February 16, 1986 (aged 82) Fort Wayne, Indiana, United States

Sport
- Sport: Sprinting
- Event: 400 metres
- College team: Butler University, Indianapolis, IN

Hermon Edgar Phillips (August 2, 1903 – February 16, 1986) was an American sprinter. He competed in the men's 400 metres at the 1928 Summer Olympics.

== Athletic career ==
Herman ran at Butler University from 1925 to 1927 where he was the NCAA national champion in the 440-yards run. He was also the AAU champion in the 440 in 1927.

In the 1928 Summer Olympics in Amsterdam, he won his first round and quarter final heat of the 400m before finishing second in this semi-final and 6th in the final.

Phillips went on to coach track at Butler University from 1927 to 1937 and founded the Butler Realys. He then coached at Purdue University from 1937 to 1945.
