= Antal Odri =

Hungarian sprinter

Personal information
- Nationality: Hungarian
- Born: 25 December 1900
- Died: 15 January 1945 (aged 44)

Sport
- Sport: Sprinting
- Event: 4 × 400 metres relay

Antal Odri (25 December 1900 – 15 January 1945) was a Hungarian sprinter. He competed in the men's 4 × 400 metres relay at the 1928 Summer Olympics.
