= Alfonso de Gortari =

Mexican long jumper (1904–1983)

Personal information
- Full name: Alfonso de Gortari
- Born: 11 January 1904 Morelia, Michoacán, Mexico
- Died: 16 March 1983 (aged 79)
- Height: 1.73 m (5 ft 8 in)
Medal record
Men's athletics
Representing Mexico
Central American and Caribbean Games
Gold medal – first place	1926 Mexico City	Long jump

Alfonso de Gortari (11 January 1904 – 16 March 1983) was a Mexican long jumper who competed in the 1928 Summer Olympics. He was born in Morelia, Michoacán.
