= Ruth Engelhard =

German athletics competitor (1909–1975)

Personal information
- Nationality: German
- Born: 3 January 1909 Lichterfelde (Berlin), Kingdom of Prussia
- Died: 22 October 1975 (aged 66) Darmstadt, Germany
- Occupation: athletics competitor
- Spouse: Hermann Engelhard

Sport
- Event: 80 metres hurdles
Medal record
Representing Germany
1934 Women's World Games
Gold medal – first place	80 metres hurdles

Ruth Engelhard, formerly Ruth Becker (born 3 January 1909, in Lichterfeld – died 22 October 1975, in Darmstadt), was a German track and field athlete and a successful 80 metres hurdler in the 1930s.

== Career ==
At the 1934 Women's World Games on 11 August 1934, in London, she won the 80 metres hurdles in 11.6 seconds, improving the existing world record by one tenth of a second.This record was set under the auspices of the International Women's Sports Federation (FSFI), which organized the Women's World Games separately from the IAAF; this may explain its absence from some later IAAF-focused world record progression lists.

She was also involved in two world records in relay race: on 20 July 1929 she achieved a time of 2:05.3 minutes in the 10 × 100 metres relay. On 26 June 1932, the German national relay team set a world record of 1:45.8 minutes in the 4 × 200 metres relay in Neuhausen. She won four German championships: three times in the 80-meter relay (1929, 1933, and 1934) and once with the 4x100-meter relay team of SV Siemens Berlin in 1934.

She had been married since 1932 to Hermann Engelhard (1903–1984), a track and field athlete and two-time medalist at the 1928 Olympic Games.
