= Reinhold Schmidt =

German sprinter

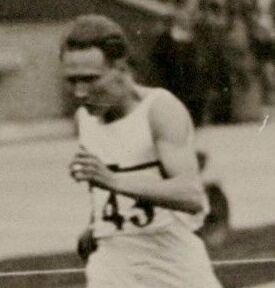
- Reinhold Schmidt in 1928

Personal information
- Nationality: German
- Born: 17 August 1902
- Died: 16 August 1974 (aged 71)

Sport
- Sport: Sprinting
- Event: 400 metres

Reinhold Schmidt (17 August 1902 – 16 August 1974) was a German sprinter. He competed in the men's 400 metres at the 1928 Summer Olympics. Schmidt was also a two-time German national champion in the 1920s, and also was part of the relay team that set a new world record in 1927.
