= Billy Green (sprinter) =

British sprinter

Personal information
- Full name: Arthur William Green
- Nationality: British
- Born: 27 July 1904
- Died: 19 August 1981 (aged 77)

Sport
- Sport: Sprinting
- Event: 400 metres

Arthur William Green (27 July 1904 – 19 August 1981) was a British sprinter. He competed in the men's 400 metres at the 1928 Summer Olympics.
