= Joe Tierney =

American sprinter (1903–2004)

Joseph Paul Tierney (February 8, 1903, in New Haven, Connecticut – April 8, 2004, in Hamden, Connecticut) was an American sprinter. Representing the United States, he ran the 400 metres in the 1928 Olympics. Tierney won his heat in 49.8, but finished fourth in his quarter-final (won in 49.2 by Canadian Phil Edwards, who would become a five time Olympic bronze medalist) and was eliminated.

Running for Holy Cross, Tierney won the 1925 IC4A 440-yard title in 47.9y; the time was his lifetime best and the best in the world that year.

Tierney survived until age 101, one of the few Olympic centenarians.
