= Leonel "Bebito" Smith =

Cuban swimmer (1909–2000)

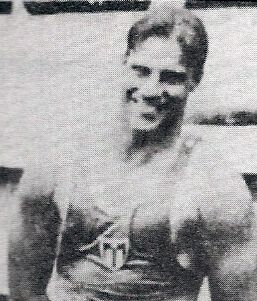
- Taken at the Central American Games in Mexico in 1926

Personal information
- Born: 1909 Varadero, Matanzas, Cuba
- Died: 2000 (aged 90–91) Havana, Cuba
Medal record
Men's swimming
Representing Cuba
Central American and Caribbean Games
Gold medal – first place	1926 Mexico City	400 m freestyle
Gold medal – first place	1926 Mexico City	1500 m freestyle
Gold medal – first place	1926 Mexico City	Relay 4x100 freestyle
Gold medal – first place	1930 Havana	400 m freestyle
Gold medal – first place	1930 Havana	1500 m freestyle
Gold medal – first place	1930 Havana	Relay 4x100 freestyle
Silver medal – second place	1930 Havana	100 m freestyle

Leonel “Bebito” Smith y Polo (1909 in Varadero, Matanzas, Cuba – 2000 in Havana) was a Cuban multiple gold medalist swimmer at the 1926 Central American Games in Mexico City, Mexico and at the 1930 Central American Games (now called the Central American and Caribbean Games) held in Havana, Cuba.

== Biography and career ==
When he was 16 years old (1925), he won the gold medal in the 1500 meter swimming competition at the Varadero Nautical Club, which was considered the national championships in swimming.

The following year (1926), he went to the I Juegos Centroamericanos (1st Central American Games) held in Mexico. He won the gold in the 400 meters (6:06.3) and 1500 meters (26:17.7), as an individual and a gold medal as member of the relay swimming team 4x100, along with Carlos González, Alberto Gou y Gonzalo Silverio.

Four years later (1930), he competed in the II Juegos Centroamericanos (2nd Central American Games) held in Havana. He again won the 400 meters (5:28.6), the 1500 meters (22:22.0), and the relay of 4x100 with Gonzalo Silverio, Cosme Carol and Pablo La Rosa (4:26.2). He also won a silver medal in the 100 meters, just behind his teammate Pablo La Rosa.

A little after the 1930 games he suffered an accident and had to retire from competitive swimming. From then on until just before his death he was a teacher and swimming coach. In the 1950s Smith was the swimming coach at Belen School. The Cuban government in 1999, declared that from then on June 30 would be the Day of the Swimmer in his honor.
