= Georges Dupont =

French sprinter

Personal information
- Nationality: French
- Born: 14 May 1903
- Died: 5 April 1983 (aged 79)

Sport
- Sport: Sprinting
- Event: 400 metres

Georges Dupont (14 May 1903 – 5 April 1983) was a French sprinter. He competed in the men's 400 metres at the 1928 Summer Olympics.
