= James Hall (athlete) =

Indian sprinter

Personal information
- Full name: James Stanton Hall
- Nationality: Indian
- Born: 2 January 1903
- Died: 20 May 1929 (aged 26) Calcutta, British India

Sport
- Sport: Track and field
- Event(s): 100m, 200m, 400m

James Stanton Hall (2 January 1903 – 20 May 1929) was an Indian sprinter. He competed at the 1924 and 1928 Summer Olympics.
