= Francisco Costas =

Mexican sprinter

Personal information
- Born: 21 October 1907 Mexico City, Mexico

Sport
- Sport: Sprinting
- Event: 100 metres
Medal record
Men's athletics
Representing Mexico
Central American and Caribbean Games
Silver medal – second place	1926 Mexico City	High jump

Francisco Costas (born 21 October 1907, date of death unknown) was a Mexican sprinter. He competed in the men's 100 metres at the 1928 Summer Olympics.
