= Mór Gerő =

Hungarian sprinter

Personal information
- Nationality: Hungarian
- Born: 3 June 1903
- Died: 6 March 1979 (aged 74)

Sport
- Sport: Sprinting
- Event: 400 metres

Mór Gerő (3 June 1903 – 6 March 1979) was a Hungarian sprinter. He competed in the men's 400 metres at the 1928 Summer Olympics. During the 1920s, he was also a three-time national champion.
