= Richard Krebs =

German sprinter (1906–1996)

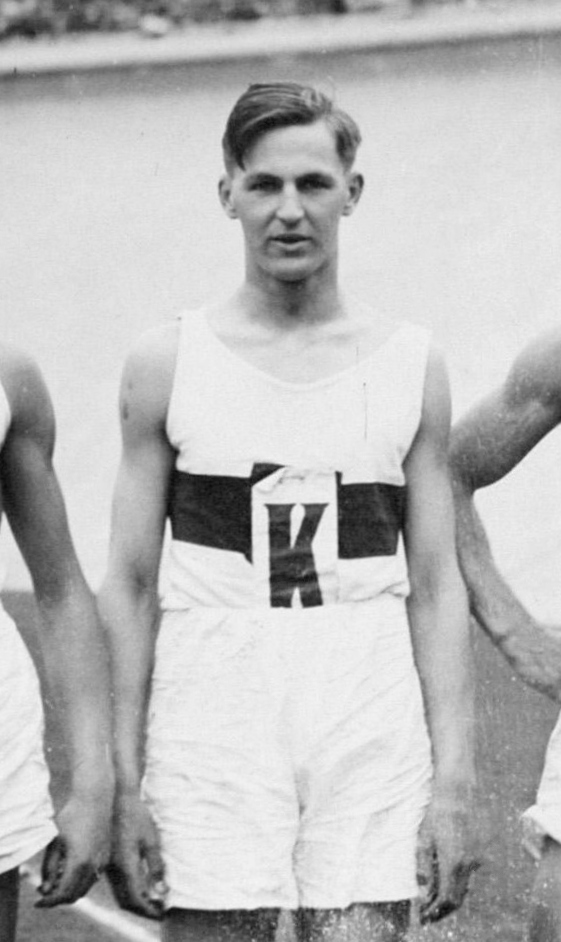
- Krebs at the 1928 Olympics

Personal information
- Born: 30 July 1906 Hamburg, Germany
- Died: 29 June 1996 (aged 89) Hamburg, Germany

Sport
- Sport: Athletics
- Event: 400 m
- Club: Hamburger SV

Achievements and titles
- Personal best: 400 m – 40.1 (1928)
Medal record
Representing Germany
Olympic Games
| Silver medal – second place | 1928 Amsterdam | 4 × 400 m relay |

Richard Krebs (30 July 1906 – 29 June 1996) was a German sprinter who won a silver medal in the 4 × 400 m relay at the 1928 Summer Olympics. This was his only international competition. Domestically he finished third in the 400 m at the 1929 national championships.
