= Ciro Chapa =

Mexican long-distance runner

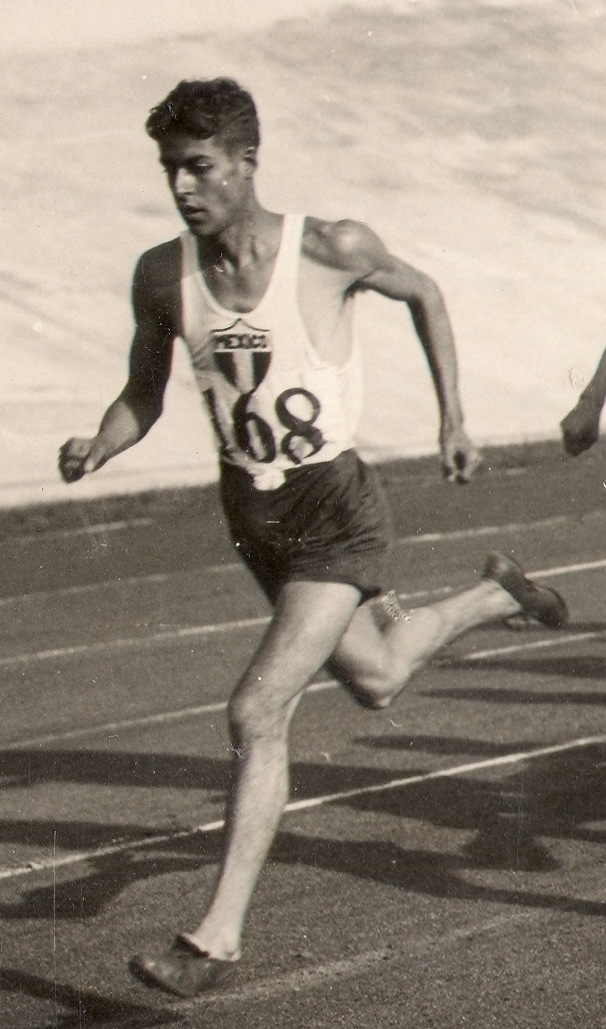
- Ciro Chapa in 1928

Personal information
- Full name: Ciro Chapa Huesca
- Born: 1901 Hidalgo, Mexico

Sport
- Sport: Long-distance running
- Event: 5000 metres

Ciro Chapa (born 1901, date of death unknown) was a Mexican long-distance runner. He competed in the men's 5000 metres at the 1928 Summer Olympics.
