= Douglas Neame =

English hurdler (1901–1988)

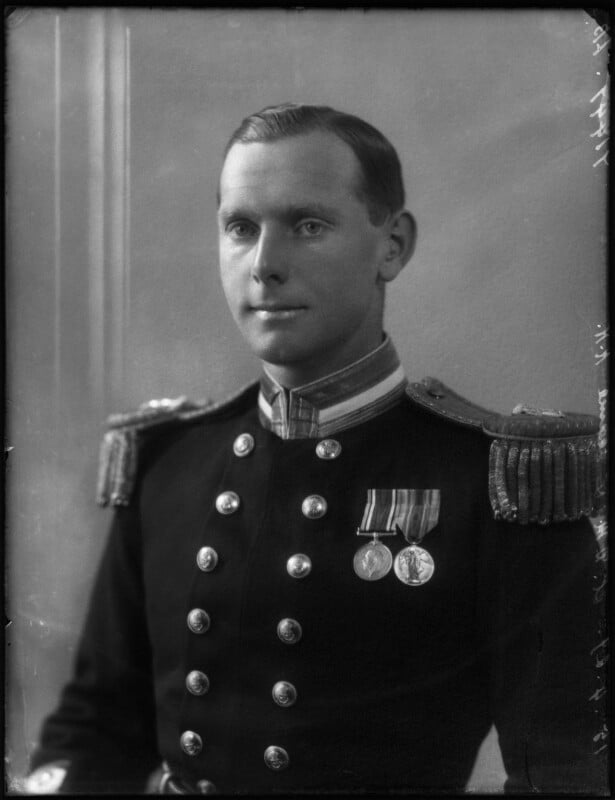
- Neame in 1929

Personal information
- Nationality: English
- Born: Douglas Mortimer Lewes Neame; 9 October 1901 Hanover Square, London, England
- Died: 13 June 1988 (aged 86) Salisbury, England
- Height: 183 cm (6 ft 0 in)
- Weight: 73 kg (161 lb)

Sport
- Sport: Athletics
- Event: hurdles
- Club: University of Cambridge
Medal record
Men's Athletics
Representing England
British Empire Games
Bronze medal – third place	1930 Hamilton	440 yards hurdles

Commodore Douglas Mortimer Lewes Neame DSO* (9 October 1901 – 13 June 1988) was an English track and field athlete who competed at the 1928 Summer Olympics.

== Biography ==
Neame was born in Hanover Square.

At the 1928 Olympic Games in Amsterdam, he was eliminated in the first round of the 110 metre hurdles event.

Neame finished third behind Luigi Facelli in the 440 yards hurdles event at the 1929 AAA Championships.

Shortly before the 1930 British Empire Games in Canada, Neame finished third behind Lord burghley and Facelli in the 440 yards event at the 1930 AAA Championships. At the 1930 British Empire Games he won the bronze medal in the 440 yards hurdles competition.

He carried the Olympic Torch across the English Channel for the 1948 Olympic Games. He died in Salisbury.
