= René Féger =

French sprinter

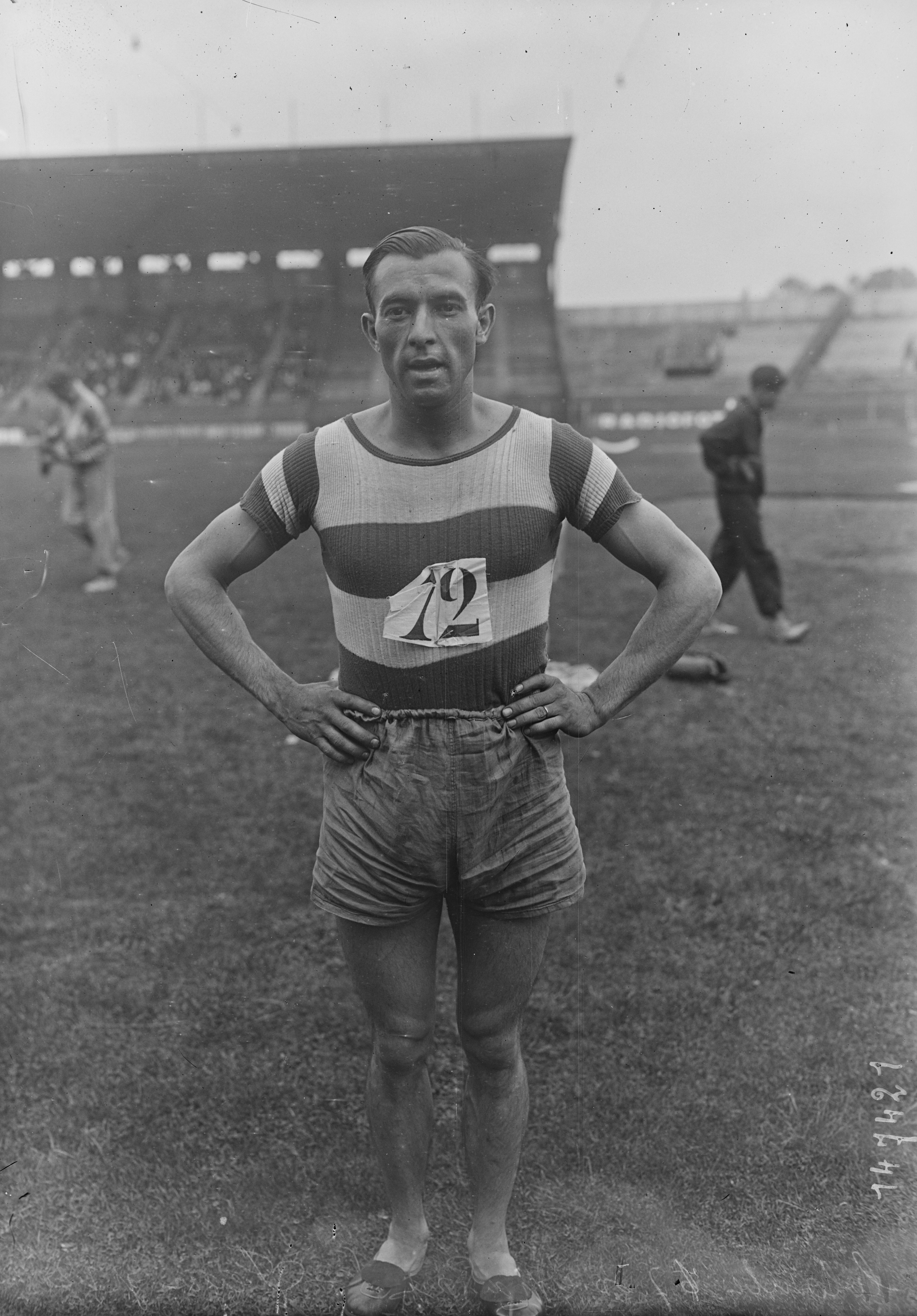
- René Féger in 1930

Personal information
- Nationality: French
- Born: 8 April 1904 Maisons-Laffitte, Yvelines, France
- Died: 30 August 1943 (aged 39) Maisons-Laffitte, Yvelines, France
- Height: 176 cm (5 ft 9 in)
- Weight: 68 kg (150 lb)

Sport
- Sport: Sprinting
- Event: 400 metres/800 metres
- Club: Métropolitain Club Colombes

René Ernest Féger (8 April 1904 – 30 August 1943) was a French sprinter who competed at the 1928 Summer Olympics.

== Career ==
Féger finished third behind Douglas Lowe in the 880 yards event at the 1927 AAA Championships.

Féger competed in the men's 400 metres at the 1928 Olympic Games, where he reached the semi-finals.
