= 1930 Central American and Caribbean Games =

2nd edition of the Central American and Caribbean Games

Central American Sports Games
- Host city: Havana, Cuba
- Edition: 2nd
- Nations: 9 Central American and Caribbean teams
- Athletes: 596
- Events: 44 in 10 sports
- Opening: 15 March 1930
- Closing: 5 April 1930
- Opened by: Dr. Rafael Martínez Ortíz
- Athlete's Oath: Miguel Gutiérrez
- Main venue: Stadium Cervecería Tropical

1930 Central American and Caribbean Games, officially the II Central American Games (Spanish: Juegos Deportivos Centroamericanos), took place in Havana, Cuba, from 15 March to 5 April 1930. Joined by 596 athletes from nine nations, the event was heavily supported by the host nation, which deployed two military cruisers to transport visiting Caribbean delegations.

The Games featured major historic milestones, including the formal integration of football and the debut of female athletes, highlighted by Cuban tennis player María Luisa García Longa becoming the region's first female gold medalist. Individual performances dominated the tournament, including an undefeated 21-bout fencing run by Cuba's Ramón Fonst and record-breaking track sweeps by Panamanian sprinter Reginal Bedford and Mexican distance runner Felipe Jardines. Cuba topped the final medal standings with 30 gold medals, followed by second-place Mexico and third-place Panama.

== History ==
The events were held in Havana, Cuba, from 15 March to 5 April 1930. Cuba supported transportation by deploying two military cruisers, the "Cuba" and the "Patria," to pick up 596 athletes from six of the eight visiting foreign delegations across the Caribbean. The grand opening ceremony took place at the newly constructed La Tropical stadium on 15 March.

Cuban secure titles in athletics, baseball, soccer, fencing, tennis, swimming, and shooting, topping the overall standings with 30 gold medals and 75 total medals. Mexico established itself as the second place (12-18-10) with top ranks in basketball, diving, and volleyball, while Panama finished at third place.Football (soccer) was added right before the 1930 FIFA World Cup.

Ramón Fonst put on a defensive dominance, going undefeated across 21 consecutive bouts to capture individual gold medals in both foil and épée, before a severe ankle injury forced him to withdraw from the saber event after starting with five consecutive 5–0 victories. On the track, Panamanian sprinter Reginal Bedford broke regional records to win both the 200-meter and 400-meter sprints, while Mexican runner Felipe Jardines secured gold in the 5,000 and 10,000 meters.

This marked the debut of female athletes in the tournament's history. Cuban tennis player María Luisa García Longa became the first female gold medalist in regional sports history by winning the women's singles draw at the Vedado Tennis Club, an event contested entirely by six local players due to a lack of international registrations.

Following closing ceremony at the Amadeo Roldán Auditorium, the general assembly awarded the third edition of the games to El Salvador, which eventually hosted the event in 1935 after a one-year structural delay.

== Sports ==
- Athletics
- Baseball
- Basketball
- Diving
- Fencing
- Football
- Shooting
- Swimming
- Tennis
- Volleyball

== Medal table ==
* Host nation (Cuba)

1930 Central American Sports Games medal table
Rank	Nation	Gold	Silver	Bronze	Total
1	Cuba (CUB)*	28	19	21	68
2	Mexico (MEX)	12	18	10	40
3	Panama (PAN)	4	1	5	10
4	Puerto Rico (PUR)	0	3	0	3
5	Costa Rica (CRC)	0	1	1	2
5	Honduras (HON)	0	1	1	2
7	Jamaica (JAM)	0	1	0	1
8	El Salvador (ESA)	0	0	2	2
8	Guatemala (GUA)	0	0	2	2
Totals (9 entries)		44	44	42	130

== See also ==
- Leonel "Bebito" Smith
