= Luis Estévez =

American fashion designer

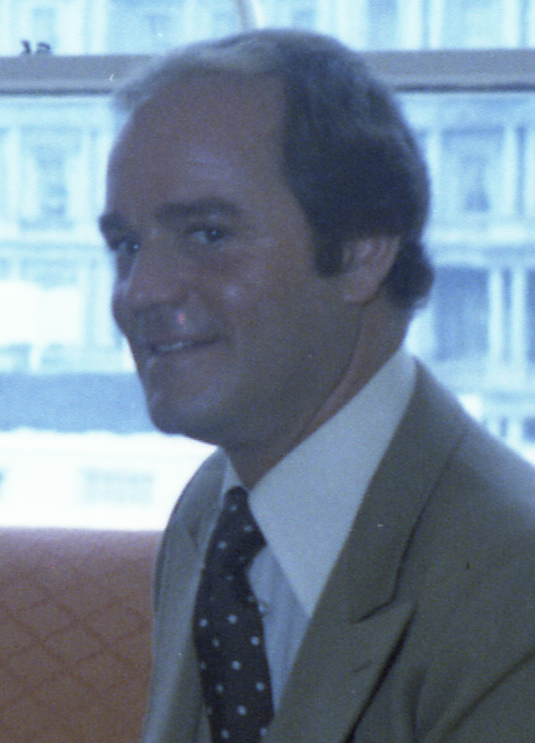
- Estévez in 1975
- Born: Luis Estévez de Gálvez c. 1930; Havana, Cuba
- Died: November 28, 2014 (aged 83–84); Miami, Florida, U.S.
- Other name: Luis Estevez
- Education: University of Havana, Traphagen School of Fashion
- Years active: 1951–1997
- Known for: Grenelle-Estévez, Estévez
- Spouse(s): Betty Dew (1953–1984, div.); Blanche "Skip" Gonzales Hathaway

Luis Estévez (c. 1930 – November 28, 2014) was a Cuban-born American fashion designer and costume designer, active between 1951 until 1997. According to the New York Times, "Luis Estevez always did make a lady look like a vamp", known for his high slits, slinky dresses and dramatic necklines.

Estévez was a founding member of Council of Fashion Designers of America (CFDA).

== Early life and education ==
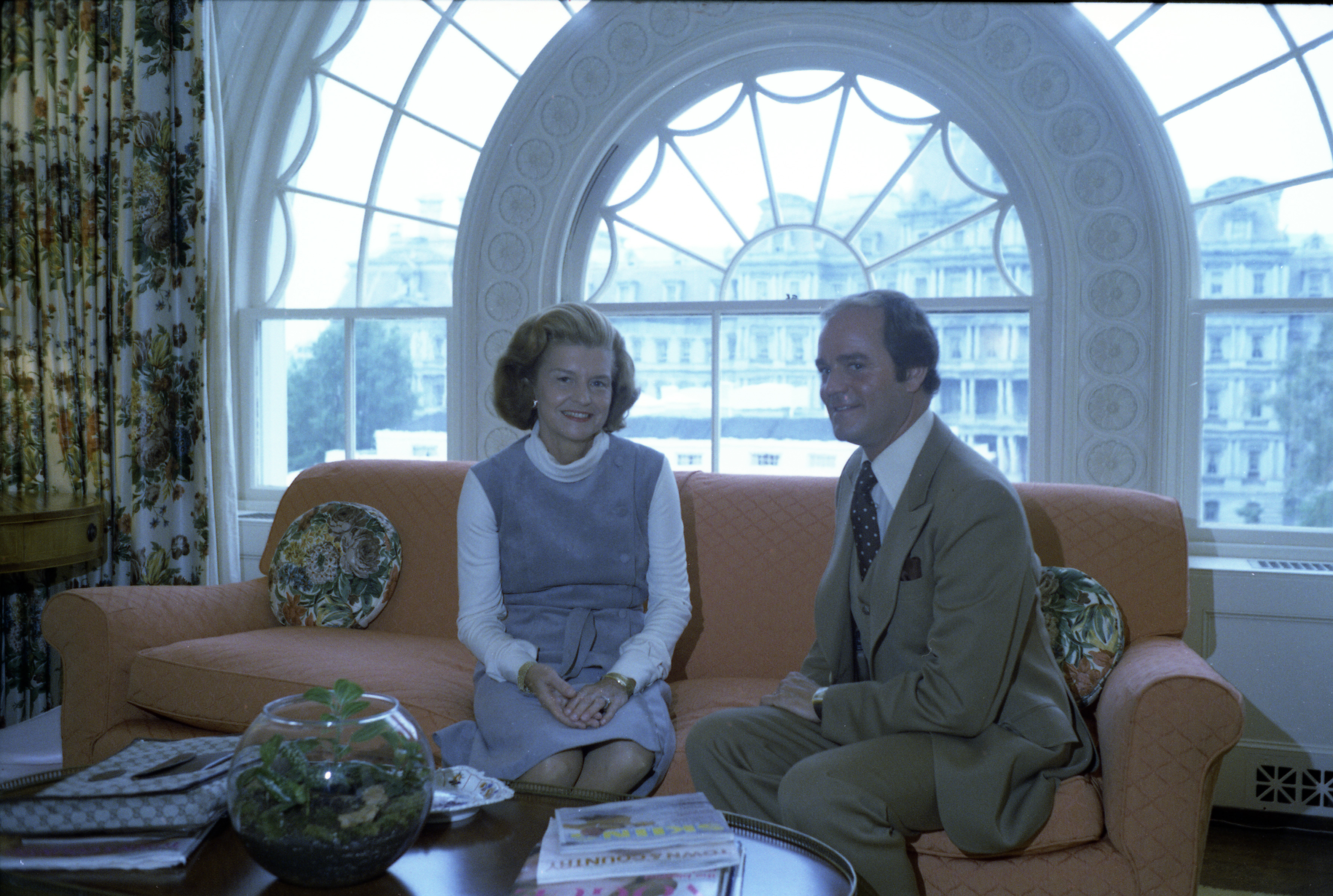
First Lady Betty Ford meeting Luis Estévez in 1975 in the west sitting hall of the White House.

Luis Estévez de Gálvez was born in c.1930 in Havana, Cuba to a wealthy Spanish-Cuban family. His father, Luis "Buffalo" Estévez, was an engineer, his mother, Gloria Cortínas Benítez de Gálvez, was a socialite, and his grandfather was a Cuban sugar magnate. His family had many generations of distinguished relatives and were descend from the De Gálvez family, whom the city of Galveston, Texas was named and from a founder of the city of St. Augustine. His mother frequently had American magazines and adored French haute couture; she encouraged and influenced his love of fashion and drawing.

At age 10, Estévez was sent to Pennsylvania to live with his aunt and her family because multiple kidnapping attempts were made on him in Cuba. He attended college-preparatory school in Delaware at Sanford School, graduating in 1947. He went on to study architecture at the University of Havana, and upon leaving college, moved to New York City. He never graduated from the University of Havana.

In New York City Estévez started to focus on fashion and he attended the Traphagen School of Fashion, graduating in 1951 in costume design. While in school he got a job in window display at the Lord & Taylor department store; the job did not pay much but it gave him experience. His mother, who divorced his father, financially supported Estévez, which allowed him to enjoy New York nightlife and meet New York society, including at the nightclub El Morocco. He started dating Bahamian-American model Betty Dew at this time; she was a regular guest at the El Morocco nightclub.

Lilly Daché, milliner and fashion designer, hired Estévez to create a few designs while he was in school but he realized he was not yet experienced enough in his career and quit that job.

== Career ==
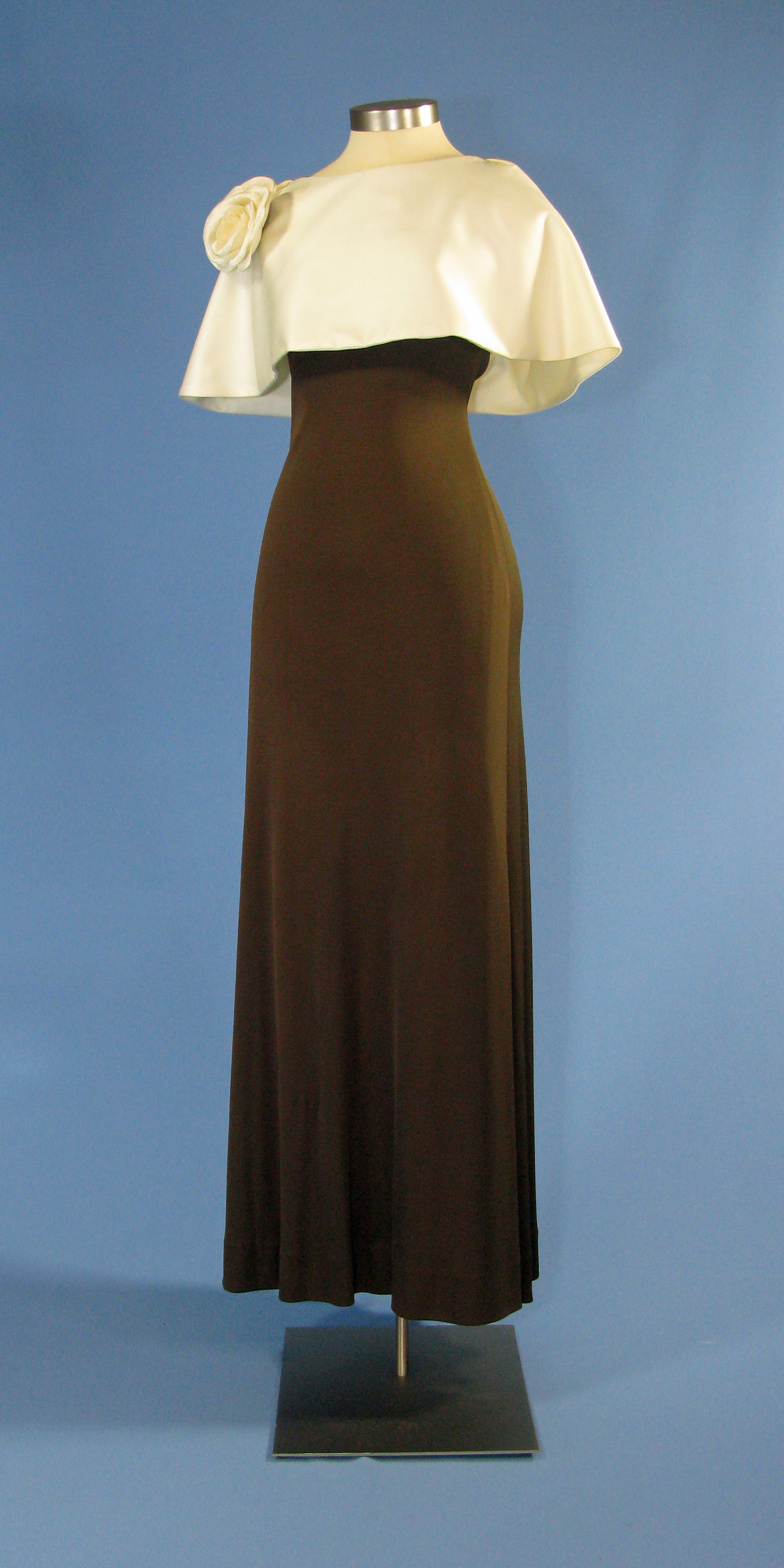
A formal gown with a cape designed by Luis Estévez in 1975, for First Lady Betty Ford.

Estévez and his girlfriend Dew took a 1951 boat trip to France together, where he befriended more established designers including Hubert de Givenchy, Jacques Fath, and French Vogue editor Françoise de Langlade. He got an internship at the house of Jean Patou and the couple stayed in France for one year.

In 1952, Estévez returned to New York City and joined Pat Hartley, a ready-to-wear fashion company. By 1955, Estévez launched his own label Grenelle-Estévez and a ready-to-wear collection with Fred Greenberg, Robert Greenberg and Ben Papell. His signature-style clothing was form-fitting cocktail and evening dresses designed with figure flattering shape, unusual angles, and noticeable necklines. His ready-to-wear clothing was moderately priced when compared to haute couture clothing, making it easy to sell in stores. One year later in 1956, at age 26, he became the youngest designer to win the Coty Award.

Estévez was very popular, and often had celebrities in his social circles. He and Dew built a hillside home in Acapulco, Mexico in 1957, named Le Cumbre. The Acapulco home was a popular party choice in the 1960s for celebrities, politicians, and socialites.

In 1960, Estévez created a black dress based on the John Singer Sargent painting Portrait of Madame X (1884). Dina Merrill modeled the Estévez dress for photographer Milton H. Greene published in Life magazine on 11 January 1960.

In the 1960s and 1970s Estévez designed swimwear for Sea Darlings of California, a Los Angeles-based company. In 1965, he moved to the Hollywood Hills in California, and began working more closely with Hollywood actors and actresses. By 1972, he was designing under a private label with actress Eva Gabor and for Universal Studios designing costumes for film and television. He dressed many important people in his career including Betty Ford, Lynda Bird Johnson, Nancy Reagan, Eva Gabor, Marlene Dietrich, Grace Kelly, Zsa Zsa Gabor, Natalie Wood, Carol Channing, among others. His label Estévez closed in 1968, and he went into working freelance. In the 1970s Estévez also designed men's clothing for Jaymar.

In 1975, Estévez met with Betty Ford in Palm Springs, while she was serving as the First Lady of the United States. Ford and Estévez discussed the creation of a line of clothing for Ford that could later be released as part of his own label, after she wore it. He created many original pieces for Ford, which were publicly worn at many formal events. He primarily worked with private clients starting in 1977.

In the 1980s he opened the Estévez boutique on Melrose Place in Los Angeles, partnering with Allan Carr. The boutique remained open until 1992. After the closure of the boutique he moved to Miami, Florida.

In 1996, Estévez returned to California in Montecito in Santa Barbara County. With a new set of investors, he opened a new boutique which closed within one year due to a legal dispute with the investors. That same year in 1997, he retired from fashion design.

== Death and legacy ==
Estévez died 28 November 2014 in Miami, Florida.

Estévez's work is featured in various public museum collections including the Metropolitan Museum of Art, Gerald R. Ford Presidential Library and Museum, Rhode Island School of Design Museum, Library of Congress, among others.

Estévez's work is said to have influenced designers Michael Kors and Zac Posen.

In 2019, Estévez's work was featured in a group exhibition The Traphagen School: Fostering American Fashion at the Museum at FIT in New York City.

== Personal life ==
In 1953, Estévez married Bahamian-American model Betty Dew. Additionally, he had many affairs with both men and women despite being married to Dew, and was known to have had affairs with fashion designer Halston and actress Ethel Merman. He was open about being bisexual. Estévez and Dew divorced in 1984, after several years of living apart many months out of the year.

For two years in the 1980s, he was married to Blanche "Skip" Gonzales Hathaway. She was the widow of film director Henry Hathaway.

== Awards ==
- 1956 – Winnies, Coty Award
- 1990 – Hispanic Designers', Lifetime Achievement Award, Hispanic Designers Gala.
