= Georges Krotoff =

French sprinter

Personal information
- Nationality: French
- Born: 13 July 1906
- Died: 6 August 1987 (aged 81)

Sport
- Sport: Sprinting
- Event: 400 metres

Georges Krotoff (13 July 1906 – 6 August 1987) was a French sprinter. He competed in the men's 400 metres at the 1928 Summer Olympics.
