= Alex Wilson (Canadian sprinter) =

Canadian sprinter

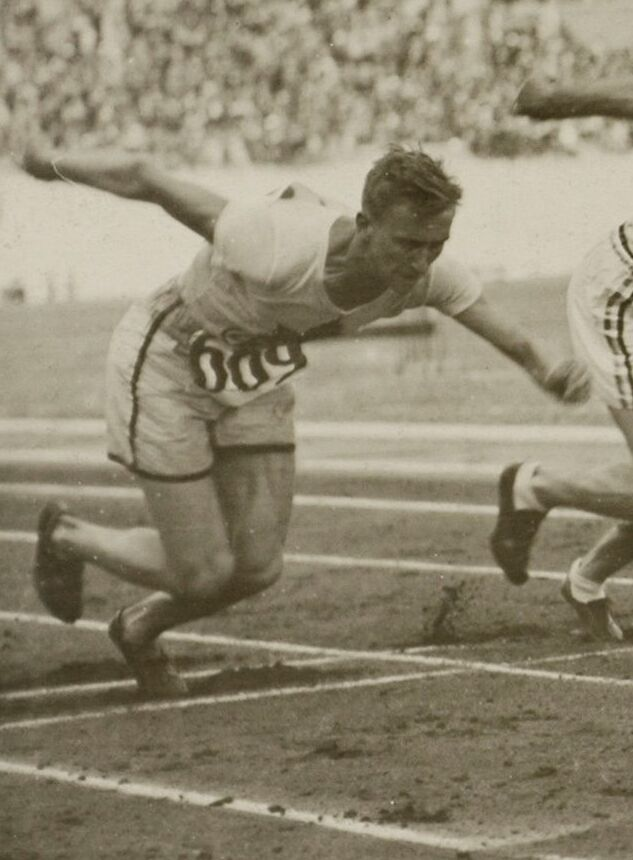

Medal record

Men's athletics

Representing Canada

Olympic Games
Silver medal – second place	1932 Los Angeles	800 m
Bronze medal – third place	1928 Amsterdam	4 × 400 m relay
Bronze medal – third place	1932 Los Angeles	400 m
Bronze medal – third place	1932 Los Angeles	4 × 400 m relay

British Empire Games
Gold medal – first place	1930 Hamilton	440 yd
Silver medal – second place	1930 Hamilton	4 × 440 yd
Bronze medal – third place	1930 Hamilton	880 yd

Alexander S. Wilson (December 1, 1907 – December 9, 1994) was a Canadian sprinter who competed in both the 1928 Summer Olympics and the 1932 Summer Olympics. He was born in Montreal and died in Mission, Texas, United States.

In 1928 he won a bronze medal with the Canadian team in the 4 × 400 metres relay event. In the 400 metre competition as well as in the 800 metre contest he was eliminated in the semi-finals. Four years later, he won the silver medal in the 800 metre event and the bronze medal in the 400 metre competition. With the Canadian team he won another bronze medal in the 4 × 400 metre relay contest.

At the 1930 British Empire Games (now the Commonwealth Games) he won the gold medal in the 440 yards event and the bronze medal in the 880 yards competition. With the Canadian relay team he won the silver medal in the 4 × 440 yards contest. He was a track and field athlete at the University of Notre Dame and the Alex Wilson Invitational was named for him because he went on to coach the track and field team for several decades. At Notre Dame he won the 400 meter NCAA Outdoor Championship in 1932.

Wilson was born in Montreal, Quebec and died in Hidalgo, Texas.

== Awards ==
- Canadian Track Hall of Fame (1954)
- Helms Athletic Foundation Hall of Fame (1967)
- National Collegiate Athletic Association Cross Country Coaches Association National Coach of the Year (1972)
- US Track & Field & Cross Country Coaches Association Hall of Fame (2008)
