= John Rinkel =

English sprinter (1905–1975)

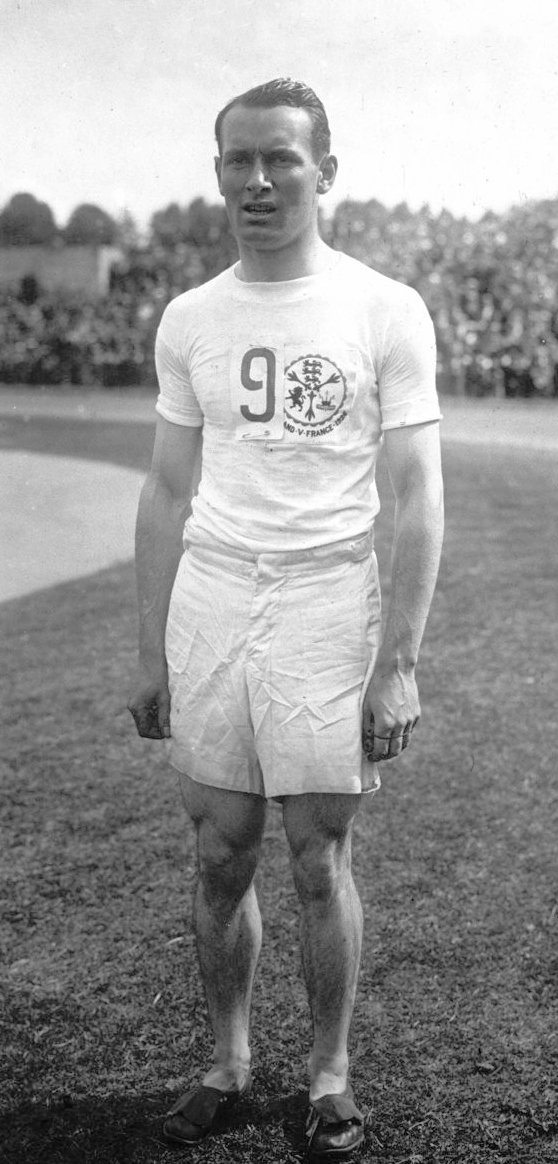
- John Rinkel in 1926

Personal information
- Born: 24 March 1905 Hilversum, Netherlands
- Died: 13 March 1975 (aged 69) Gerrards Cross, Buckinghamshire, England
- Education: University of Cambridge
- Height: 1.83 m (6 ft 0 in)
- Weight: 75 kg (165 lb)

Sport
- Sport: Athletics
- Events: 200 m, 400 m
- Club: University of Cambridge; Achilles Club

Achievements and titles
- Personal bests: 200 m – 21.5e (1928); 400 m – 48.4 (1928)

Jan William Joslin Rinkel also known as John Rinkel (24 March 1905 – 13 March 1975) was an English sprinter who competed at the 1928 Summer Olympics.

== Career ==
Rinkel was educated at Blundell's School and Clare College, Cambridge. He competed in the Oxbridge Sports from 1925 through to 1928.

Rinkel finished second behind Loren Murchison in the 220 yards event at the 1925 AAA Championships. The following year he became the national 440 yards champion after winning the British AAA Championships title at the 1926 AAA Championships. He also finished second in the 440 yards behind Douglas Lowe at the 1928 AAA Championships

After becoming a British citizen in April 1927, Rinkel competed in the 400 metres and 4 × 400 metres relay events at the 1928 Summer Olympics and placed fourth and fifth, respectively. He was a member of the Achilles team that won the AAA medley relay in 1926 and the 4×440 yd relay in 1928–29.
