= Otto Neumann (athlete) =

German sprinter (1902–1990)

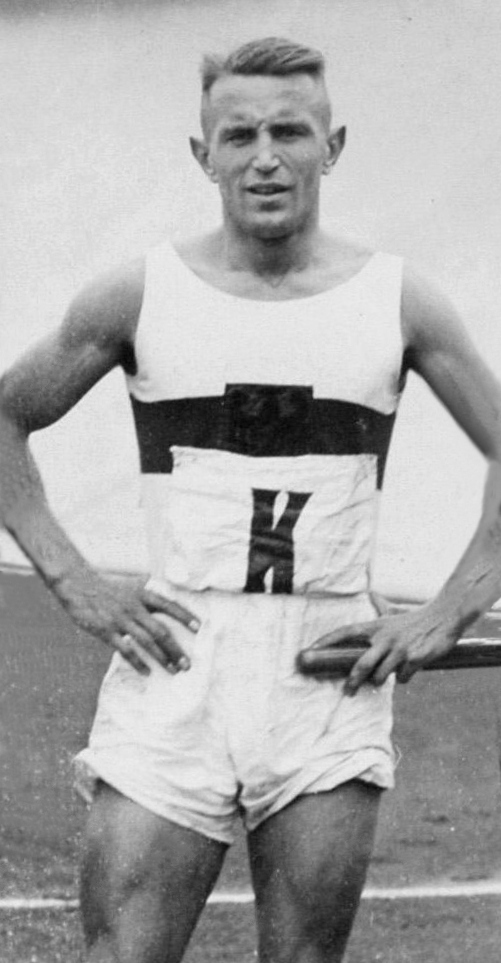
- Neumann at the 1928 Olympics

Personal information
- Born: 28 August 1902 Karlsruhe, German Empire
- Died: 12 April 1990 (aged 87) Mannheim, West Germany
- Height: 178 cm (5 ft 10 in)
- Weight: 71 kg (157 lb)

Sport
- Sport: Athletics
- Events: 200 m, 400 m, 400 m hurdles
- Club: Deutscher Sportclub Berlin

Achievements and titles
- Personal bests: 200 m – 21.9 (1931); 400 m – 47.9e (1928); 400 mH – 55.0 (1928)
Medal record
Representing Germany
Olympic Games
Silver medal – second place	1928 Amsterdam	4 × 400 m relay
Association football career
Managerial career
- Years: Team
- 1936–1937: VfL Neckarau
- 1937–1940: Waldhof Mannheim
- 1940–1941: VfR Mannheim
- 1947–19??: Amicitia Viernheim

Otto Neumann (28 August 1902 – 12 April 1990) was a German sprinter who competed at the 1928 Summer Olympics. He won a silver medal in the 4 × 400 m relay and failed to reach the final of the individual 400 m event.

Neumann won the national titles in 400 m (1922 and 1924), 4 × 400 m relay (1927–28) and 400 m hurdles (1928). Besides running he played four international football matches and then worked as a football coach for SV Waldhof Mannheim and SV Amicitia 09 Viernheim.

In 1939 Neumann graduated with a diploma in physical education. He later became a professor and director of the Institute of Physical Education in Karlsruhe, and an honorary professor at the University of Heidelberg, where in 1950 he founded the basketball club USC Heidelberg. His wife Maria and both sons Fritz and Hannes played basketball. Hannes later became a basketball coach and professor in sports science.
