= Roger Leigh-Wood =

English athlete (1906–1987)

Personal information
- Nationality: British (English)
- Born: 16 August 1906 Paddington, London, England
- Died: 1 March 1987 (aged 80) Alton, England

Sport
- Sport: Athletics
- Event: 440y/400m/hurdles
- Club: University of Oxford AC; Achilles Club
Medal record
Men's Athletics
Representing England
British Empire Games
Gold medal – first place	1930 Hamilton	4×440 yd relay
Silver medal – second place	1930 Hamilton	440 yards hurdles

Roger Leigh-Wood (né Wood, 16 August 1906 – 1 March 1987) was an English athlete who competed for Great Britain in the 1928 Summer Olympics.

== Biography ==
Leigh-Wood was born in Paddington, London. He finished third behind Douglas Lowe in the 440 yards event at the 1927 AAA Championships.

He finished second behind Douglas Lowe again in the 440 yards event at the 1928 AAA Championships. Shortly afterwards he represented Great Britain at the 1928 Olympic Games in Amsterdam, Netherlands, where he was a member of the British relay team which finished fifth in the 4×400 metre relay event. In the 400 metres competition he was eliminated in the quarter-finals.

At the 1930 British Empire Games he won the gold medal with the English team in the 4×440 yards relay contest and the silver medal in the 440 yards hurdles event.

He was High Sheriff of Hampshire in 1964.

He died in Alton.
