= Harry Werner Storz =

German sprinter (1904–1982)

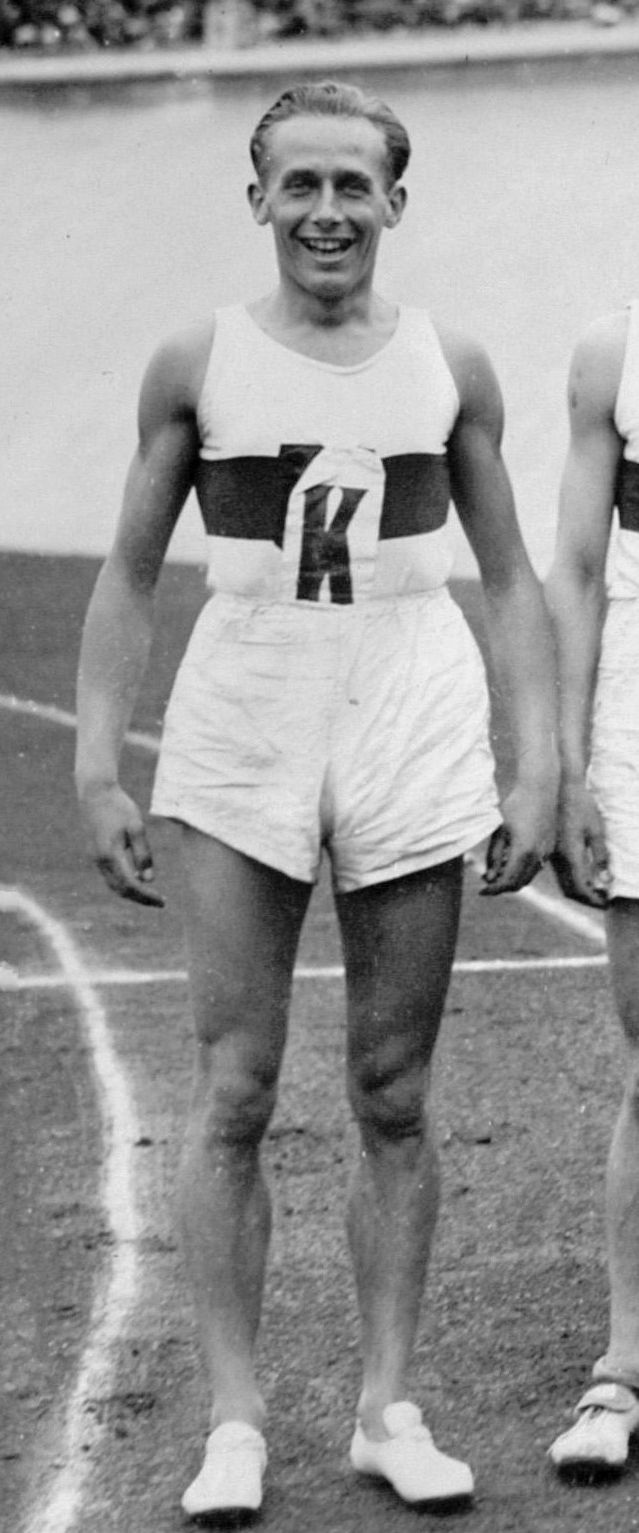
- Storz at the 1928 Olympics

Personal information
- Born: 3 March 1904 Halle (Saale), German Empire
- Died: 13 August 1982 (aged 78) Hamburg, West Germany
- Height: 175 cm (5 ft 9 in)
- Weight: 68 kg (150 lb)

Sport
- Sport: Athletics
- Events: 400 m, long jump
- Club: VfL Halle 1896

Achievements and titles
- Personal bests: 400 m – 48.4 (1928); LJ – 7.34 m (1929)
Medal record
Representing Germany
Olympic Games
Silver medal – second place	1928 Amsterdam	4 × 400 m relay

Harry Werner Storz (3 March 1904 – 13 August 1982) was a German sprinter who competed at the 1928 Summer Olympics. He won a silver medal in the 4 × 400 m relay and finished fifth in the individual 400 m event.
