= Víctor Villaseñor =

Mexican sprinter

Personal information
- Nationality: Mexican
- Born: 23 December 1903
- Died: 9 December 1981 (aged 77)

Sport
- Sport: Sprinting
- Event: 400 metres

Víctor Villaseñor (23 December 1903 – 9 December 1981) was a Mexican sprinter. He competed in the men's 400 metres at the 1928 Summer Olympics.
