= Jesús Aguirre (athlete) =

Mexican shot putter (1902–1954)

Personal information
- Born: 26 July 1902 Santa Bárbara, Chihuahua, Mexico
- Died: 23 April 1954 (aged 51) Coyoacán, Mexico

Sport
- Sport: Athletics
- Event(s): Shot put Discus

Jesús Aguirre (26 July 1902 – 23 April 1954) was a Mexican athlete. He competed in the men's shot put at the 1924 Summer Olympics and the 1928 Summer Olympics.
