= Fred Macbeth =

Canadian sprinter

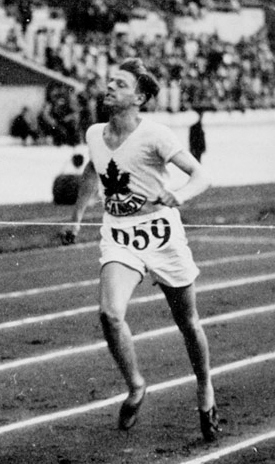
- Fred Macbeth at the 1928 Olympics

Personal information
- Born: December 26, 1909 Hamilton, Ontario, Canada
- Died: September 20, 1986 (aged 76)

Sport
- Sport: Athletics
- Event: 400 m

Achievements and titles
- Personal best: 400 m – 49.0 (1928)

Frederick William Macbeth, Jr. (December 26, 1909 – September 20, 1986) was a Canadian sprinter. He competed in the 400 m event at the 1928 Summer Olympics, but failed to reach the final. At the 1930 British Empire Games, Macbeth was eliminated in the heats of the 220 and 440 yards hurdles.
