= Jimmy Ball (athlete) =

Canadian athlete (1903–1988)

Personal information
- Full name: James Allan Ball
- Born: 7 May 1903 Dauphin, Manitoba, Canada
- Died: 2 July 1988 (aged 85) Victoria, British Columbia, Canada
- Height: 180 cm (5 ft 11 in)
- Weight: 69 kg (152 lb)

Sport
- Sport: Athletics
Medal record
Representing Canada
Olympic Games
Silver medal – second place	1928 Amsterdam	400 metres
Bronze medal – third place	1928 Amsterdam	4x400 m relay
Bronze medal – third place	1932 Los Angeles	4x400 m relay
British Empire Games
Silver medal – second place	1930 Hamilton	4×440 yd relay

James Allan Ball (7 May 1903 – 2 July 1988) was a Canadian sprint runner who competed at the 1928 and 1932 Olympics. He won a bronze medal in the 4 × 400 m relay at both Games. Individually, he finished second in the 400 m in 1928 and was eliminated in the preliminaries in 1932. At the 1930 Empire Games he won a silver medal with the Canadian team in the 4×440 yards relay. He also finished fifth in the 220 yard and in 440 yard races.

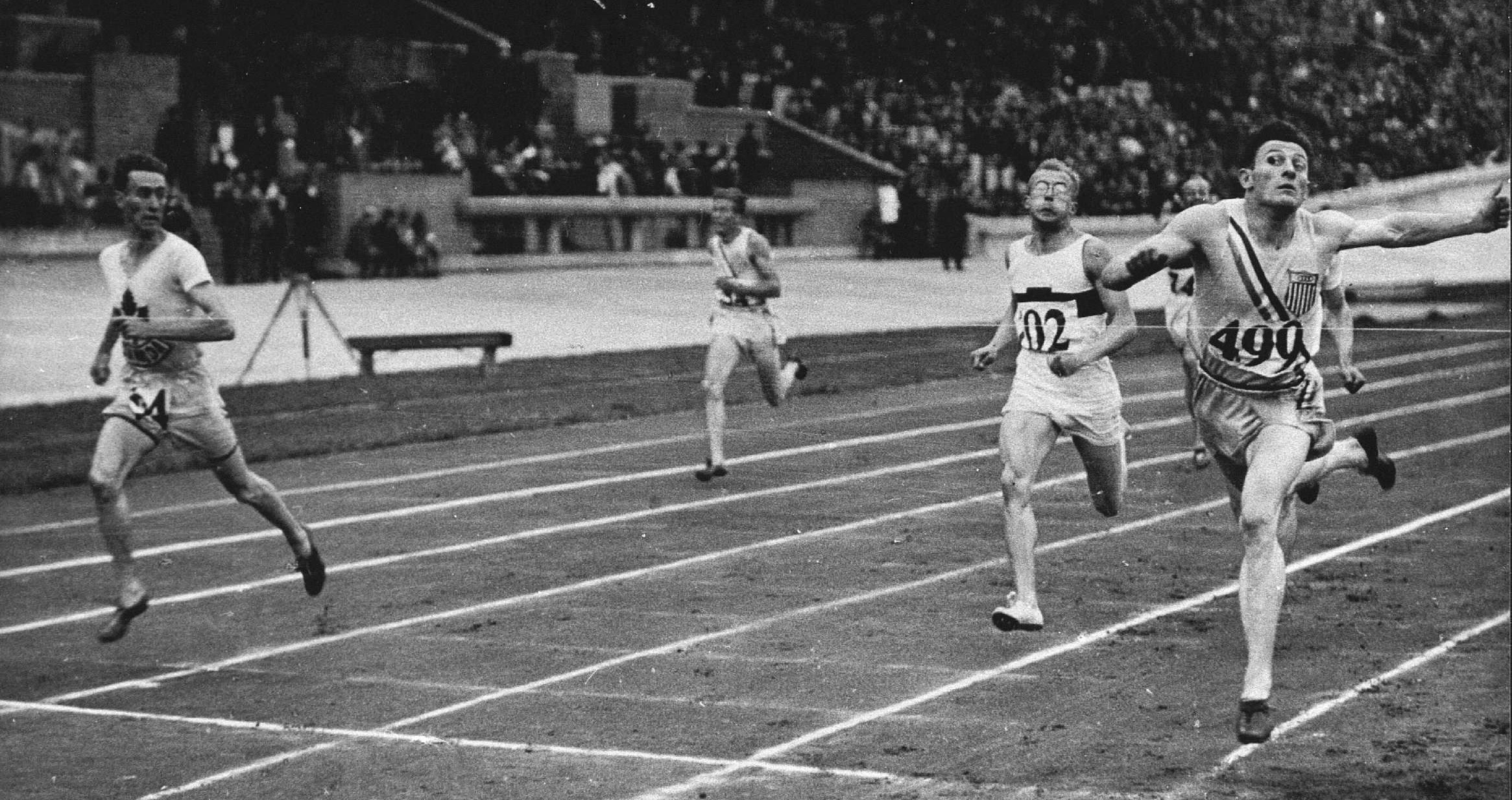
Jimmy Ball finishing second in the 400 m at the 1928 Olympics

Ball had a degree in pharmacy from the University of Manitoba. In 1927 he won national titles in the 440 yards and in the mile relay. Next year he won the Olympic trials setting a national record in the 400 m at 48.6 seconds. He improved that record to 48.0 seconds at the 1928 Games. In 1933 he earned the Norton H. Crowe trophy and won his second national title in the mile relay. He retired in 1935 after winning a third title in this event.

Ball was inducted to Canada’s Sports Hall of Fame in 1959 and to the Manitoba Sports Hall of Fame and Museum in 1980.
