= Fred Alderman =

American sprinter (1905–1998)

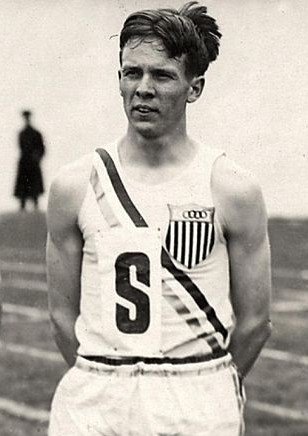
- Alderman at the 1928 Olympics

Personal information
- Born: June 24, 1905 East Lansing, Michigan, United States
- Died: September 15, 1998 (aged 93) Social Circle, Georgia, United States
- Height: 5 ft 9 1/2 in (177 cm)
- Weight: 165 lb (75 kg)

Sport
- Sport: Athletics
- Club: Illinois Athletic Club, Chicago
Medal record
Representing the United States
Olympics
Gold medal – first place	1928 Amsterdam	4 × 400 m relay

Frederick Pitt Alderman (June 24, 1905 – September 15, 1998) was an American sprint runner who won a gold medal in 4 × 400 m relay at the 1928 Summer Olympics. He also won the NCAA Championships in 100 yd (91 m) and 220 yd (200 m) and IC4A Championships in 440 yd (400 m) in 1927.

At the 1928 Olympic trials Alderman set his personal best in the 400 m at 48.0 seconds, but did much worse at the Games, at estimated 49.4 s. He was a member of Sigma Alpha Epsilon while at Michigan State College. In 1992, he was inducted into the initial class of the MSU Athletics Hall of Fame.
