= László Barsi (runner) =

Hungarian sprinter

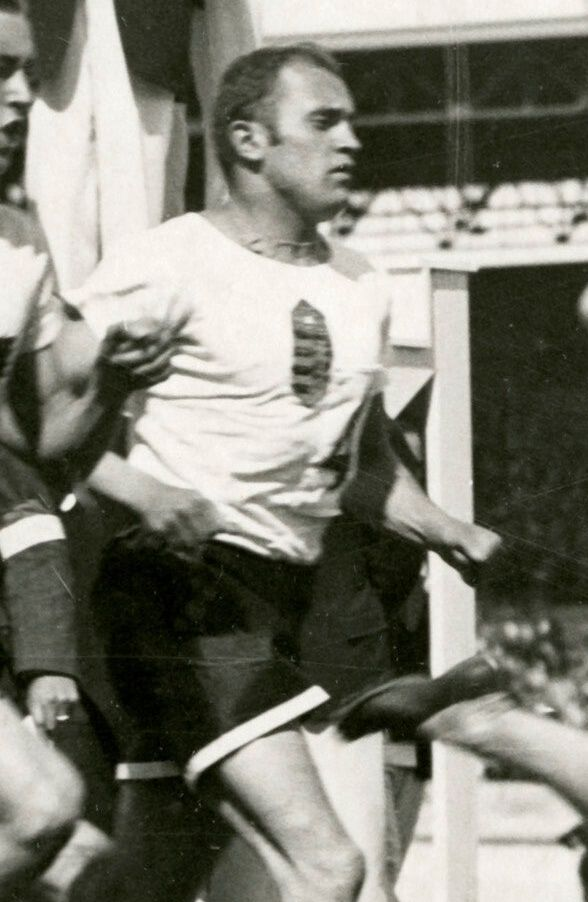
- Barsi in 1928

Personal information
- Nationality: Hungarian
- Born: 21 June 1904 Levice, Hungary
- Died: 8 September 1975 (aged 71) Budapest, Hungary
- Height: 168 cm (5 ft 6 in)
- Weight: 67 kg (148 lb)

Sport
- Sport: Athletics
- Event: 400m
- Club: BBTE, Budapest

László Barsi (21 June 1904 – 8 September 1975) was a Hungarian sprinter who competed in the 1928 Summer Olympics.

== Biography ==
He was born in Levice and died in Budapest. He appeared at the 1928 Olympic Games in Amsterdam. Barsi finished second behind John Hanlon in the 440 yards event at the 1929 AAA Championships and finished second behind Godfrey Rampling in the 440 yards event at the 1931 AAA Championships.
