= 1926 Central American and Caribbean Games =

1st edition of the Central American and Caribbean Games

Central American Sports Games
- Host city: Mexico City, Mexico
- Edition: 1st
- Nations: 3 Central American and Caribbean teams
- Athletes: 271
- Events: 39 in 8 sports
- Opening: 12 October 1926
- Closing: 2 November 1926
- Opened by: Plutarco Elías Calles
- Main venue: Estadio Nacional

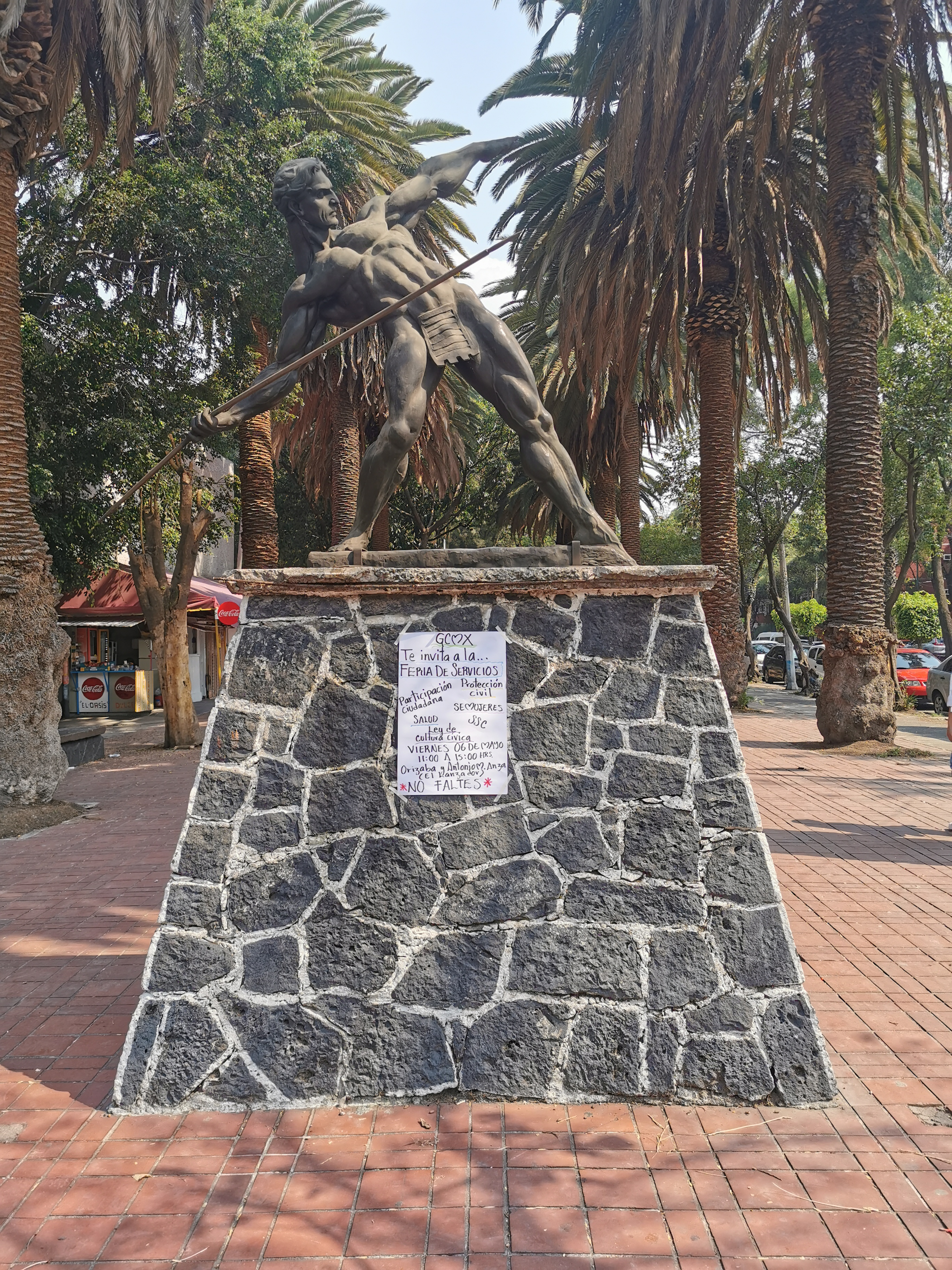
Commemorative sculpture of the 1926 Central American and Caribbean Games, colonia Roma, Mexico City.

The first edition of what is today known as Central American and Caribbean Games (CACGs) were held in Mexico City, Mexico, at Estadio Nacional from 12 October to 2 November 1926.

== History ==
Originally billed as the Central American Sports Games (Spanish: Juegos Deportivos Centroamericanos), the idea for a multi-sport regional event in Central America was formalized by the Central American Congress, an association of regional Olympic committees, on 4 July 1924 in a document stating the goals and rules of the future event.

In its Article 1, the document states that the Games would be open to "Cuba, Colombia, Mexico, Venezuela, the Central American republics and [those] of the Caribbean," that the event would launch in 1926, and that it would be held under the auspices of the International Olympic Committee.

On 16 October 1925, a meeting of sports delegates presided by Moisés Sáenz took place in Mexico City, where they agreed to hold the event's first edition in Mexico's capital the following year, with the opening date set for October 12, set to coincide with the 434th anniversary of Christopher Columbus' discovery of America on his first expedition of 1492. It was also decided that the 2nd edition would be held in 1930 in Havana.

Although 14 countries were eligible to send athletes to the event - and the event's poster printed in advance featured symbols of 10 regional nations (Costa Rica, Cuba, Guatemala, Colombia, Mexico, Panama, Haiti, Venezuela, Honduras, Dominican Republic), only three of these eventually sent athletes to the inaugural event. All the athletes were men, although the regulations had allowed for women to enter volleyball, swimming, and tennis events.

== Sports ==
The games featured 271 male athletes from three countries (Mexico, Cuba and Guatemala), competing in eight sports and 39 events. The number in parentheses next to the sport is the number of medal events per sport.

- Athletics (20)
- Baseball (1)
- Basketball (1)
- Diving (3)
- Fencing (3)
- Shooting (3)
- Swimming (6)
- Tennis (2)

== Nations ==
Three countries took part in the first Central American and Caribbean Games.

- Cuba
- Guatemala
- Mexico

== Medal table ==
* Host nation (Mexico)

1926 Central American Sports Games medal table
Rank	Nation	Gold	Silver	Bronze	Total
1	Mexico (MEX)*	25	24	18	67
2	Cuba (CUB)	14	15	15	44
3	Guatemala (GUA)	0	0	3	3
Totals (3 entries)		39	39	36	114

== See also ==
- Leonel "Bebito" Smith
