= Lucílo Iturbe =

Mexican sprinter (1907–1997)

José Lucílo Iturbe Arechiga (31 October 1907 – May 1997) was a Mexican sprinter who competed in the 1928 Summer Olympics and in the 1932 Summer Olympics. He was born in Zacatecas, Zacatecas.
