= Emerson Spencer =

American sprinter (1906–1985)

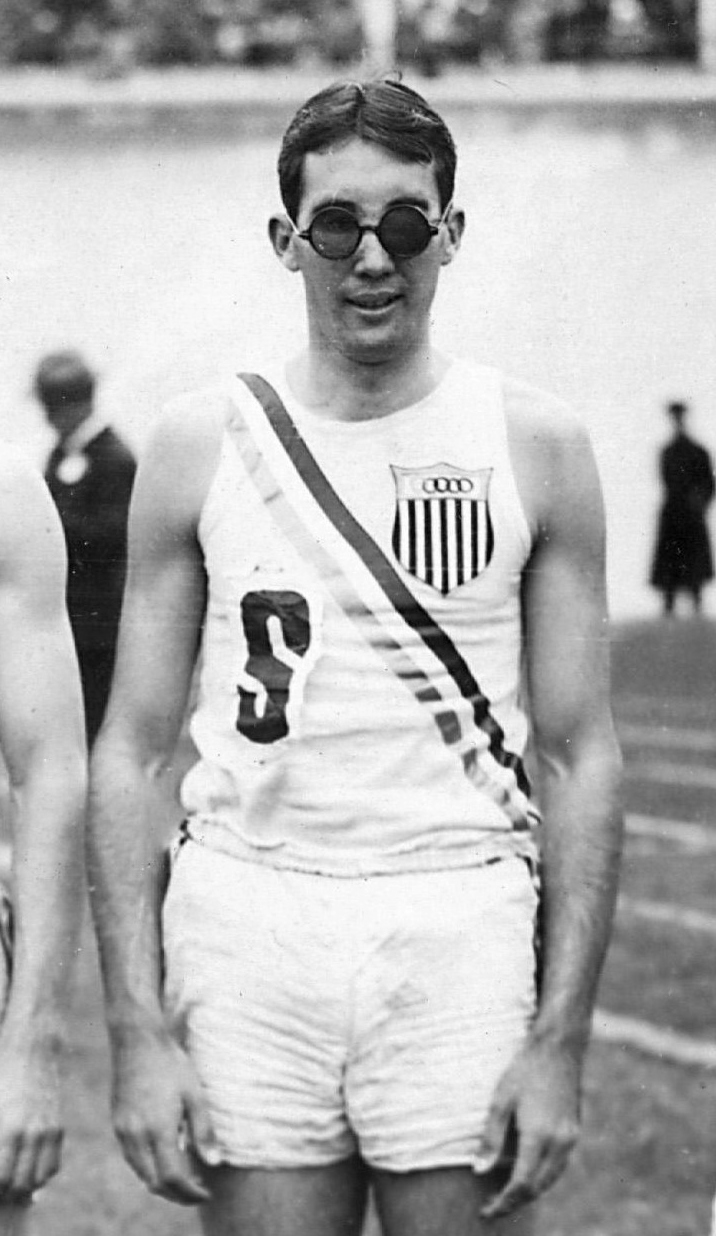
- Emerson Spencer at the 1928 Olympics

Personal information
- Born: October 10, 1906 San Francisco, California, US
- Died: May 15, 1985 (aged 78) Palo Alto, California, US
- Education: Stanford University
- Height: 1.83 m (6 ft 0 in)
- Weight: 72 kg (159 lb)

Sport
- Country: United States
- Sport: Sprinting
- Events: 400 m, 400 m hurdles
- Club: Stanford Cardinal

Achievements and titles
- Personal bests: 400 m – 47.0 (1928); 400 mH – 55.7 (1926)
Medal record
Representing the United States
Olympic Games
Gold medal – first place	1928 Amsterdam	4 × 400 m relay

Emerson Lane "Bud" Spencer (October 10, 1906 – May 15, 1985) was an American sprinter who won a gold medal in the 4 × 400 m relay at the 1928 Summer Olympics, breaking the world record in the process. A week later he helped to set another world record, at 3:13.4 in the 4 × 440 yard relay in London.

Early in his career, Spencer competed in the hurdles in addition to sprinting, finishing second in the 220 yard low hurdles and fourth in the 120 yard high hurdles while running for Modesto High School in Modesto, California at the 1923 CIF California State Meet. In 1924, he was seriously injured in a traffic collision; he completely lost sight in one of his eyes and missed the 1925 track season.

In 1926, Spencer won his first major title, the 1926 AAU junior championships in the 440 yd hurdles. Next year he won the NCAA 440 yd event in 47.7 seconds, which was the world's fastest time that year. In May 1928 he set a world record in the 400 m at 47.0 s, but failed at the Olympic Trials and was only selected for the US team in the relay. After retiring from competitions he worked as the sports editor of The San Francisco News and then as athletics coach at Stanford University, his alma mater.
