= Alfonso García (athlete) =

Mexican sprinter

Alfonso García (born 1906 in Mexico City - date of death unknown) was a Mexican sprinter who competed in the 1928 Summer Olympics.
