= Jesús Moraila =

Mexican sprinter

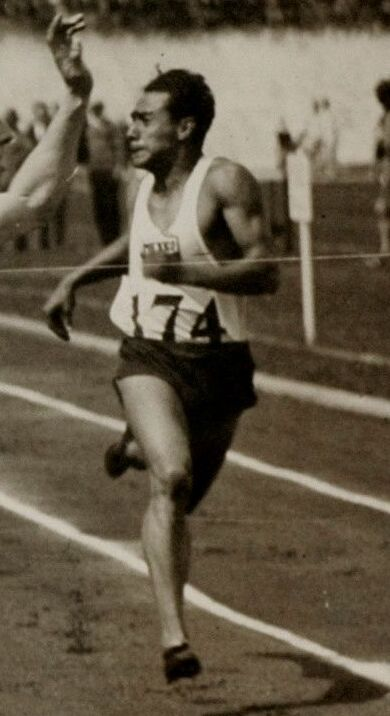
Jesús Moraila in 1928

Jesús Moraila Morales (12 September 1905 – 4 August 1983) was a Mexican sprinter who competed in the 1928 Summer Olympics and in the 1932 Summer Olympics. He was born in Culiacán, Sinaloa.
