= Athletics at the 1930 British Empire Games – Men's 4 × 110 yards relay =

Men's 4 × 110 yards relay at the Commonwealth Games

The men's 4 × 110 yards relay event at the 1930 British Empire Games was held on 23 August at the Civic Stadium in Hamilton, Canada.

== Results ==
Rank	Nation	Athletes	Time	Notes
1st place, gold medalist(s)	Canada	Leigh Miller, Jim Brown, Ralph Adams, John Fitzpatrick	42.2	NR
2nd place, silver medalist(s)	England	John Heap, James Cohen, John Hanlon, Stanley Engelhart	42.7e	+5 yd
3rd place, bronze medalist(s)	South Africa	Werner Gerhardt, Howard Davies, Wilfred Legg, Willie Walters	??.?	+3 yd
	Australia		DNS	
