= Edward Bradbrooke =

English athlete (1906–1994)

Personal information
- Nationality: British (English)
- Born: 8 August 1906 Fenny Stratford, Buckinghamshire, England
- Died: 30 September 1994 (aged 88) Yeovil, Somerset, England

Sport
- Sport: Athletics
- Event: high jump
- Club: Hurstpierpoint; University of Oxford; Achilles Club

Edward R. Bradbrooke (8 August 1906 – 30 September 1994) was an English athlete who represented England at the 1930 British Empire Games and the 1934 British Empire Games and was twice British champion. He was later known as the Reverend Canon Edward Bradbrooke and was rector of Sussex parishes including Slaugham and Graffham.

== Athletic career ==
Bradbrooke attended The Queen's College, Oxford and represented Great Britain.

Shortly before the 1930 British Empire Games in Canada, Bradbrooke finished second behind Colin Gordon in the high jump event at the 1930 AAA Championships and by virtue of being the highest placed British athlete became the British champion.

At 1930 Empire Games he competed for England in the men's high jump. He resided at Wayside in Sutton Courtney at the time and by trade was a leather buyer.

Bradbrooke became the national high jump champion again by virtue of being the highest placed British athlete, when finishing second behind Mihály Bodosi at the 1933 AAA Championships. This led to his selection for England in the White City international match against France on 29 July.

Bradbrooke competed in his second British Empire Games in the men's high jump competition in 1934.

== Priestly career ==
After serving as an army chaplain during the war, on 1 June 1951, Reverend Edward Bradbrooke was inducted as rector of Slaugham parish, where he remained for 15 years. He served the village of Slaugham, known for its 13th-century church, as well as the villages of Handcross, Pease Pottage, and Warninglid, and also became Rural Dean of Cuckfeld in 1958. In 1962, he made international headlines with the quote, "Beer is one of God's gifts", ahead of blessing beer in addition to flowers, fruits, and vegetables during the harvest festival in Slaugham.

In 1966, Bradbrooke and his wife Anne moved to Graffham near Petworth, where he was appointed rector.

== Personal life and death ==
In 1974, Bradbrooke moved from Sussex to the village of Martock near Yeovil to retire, but remained active as an assistant priest in the area.

Bradbrooke was a self-taught painter of watercolour landscapes. His paintings were featured in a calendar to raise funds for the Martock Parish Church and exhibited at a pub along with the artwork of his son in Buckland St Mary.

He died on 30 September 1994.
