= Athletics at the 1930 British Empire Games – Men's long jump =

Men's long jump at the Commonwealth Games

The men's long jump event at the 1930 British Empire Games was held on 23 August at the Civic Stadium in Hamilton, Canada.

== Results ==
Rank	Name	Nationality	Result	Notes
1st place, gold medalist(s)	Len Hutton	Canada	23 ft 7 1/2 in (7.20 m)	
2nd place, silver medalist(s)	Reg Revans	England	22 ft 6 in (6.86 m)	
3rd place, bronze medalist(s)	Johannes Viljoen	South Africa	22 ft 6 in (6.86 m)	
4	Chester Smith	Canada	22 ft 3 1/2 in (6.79 m)	
5	Gordon Smallacombe	Canada	21 ft 8 1/4 in (6.61 m)	
6	Horace Cohen	England	?.??	
7	Francis Foley	England	?.??	
