= Athletics at the 1930 British Empire Games – Men's high jump =

Canadian 1930 high jump event athletics

Men's high jump at the Commonwealth Games

The men's high jump event at the 1930 British Empire Games was held on 21 August at the Civic Stadium in Hamilton, Canada.

== Results ==
Rank	Name	Nationality	Result	Notes
1st place, gold medalist(s)	Johannes Viljoen	South Africa	6 ft 3 in (1.91 m)	
2nd place, silver medalist(s)	Colin Gordon	British Guiana	6 ft 2 in (1.88 m)	
3rd place, bronze medalist(s)	William Stargratt	Canada	6 ft 1 in (1.85 m)	
4	Duncan McNaughton	Canada	?.??	
5	Edward Bradbrooke	England	?.??	
6	Geoffrey Turner	England	?.??	
?	Jack Portland	Canada	?.??	
?	Gordon Smallacombe	Canada	?.??	
?	Reg Revans	England	?.??	
