= Athletics at the 1930 British Empire Games – Men's 220 yards =

Men's 220 yards at the Commonwealth Games

The men's 220 yards event at the 1930 British Empire Games was held on 17 August at the Civic Stadium in Hamilton, Canada.

== Medalists ==
| Gold | Silver | Bronze |
|---|---|---|
| Stanley Engelhart; England | John Fitzpatrick; Canada | Willie Walters; South Africa |

== Results ==
=== Heats ===
Qualification: First 2 in each heat (Q) qualify directly for the final.

| Rank | Heat | Name | Nationality | Time | Notes |
|---|---|---|---|---|---|
| 1 | 1 | Stanley Engelhart | England | 22.0 | Q |
| 2 | 1 | Roy Hamilton | Scotland | ??.? | Q |
| 3 | 1 | Napoleon Bourdean | Canada | ??.? | |
| 4 | 1 | Gerald Halley | Newfoundland | ??.? | |
| ? | 1 | Gregory Power | Newfoundland | ??.? | |
| ? | 1 | Ralph Adams | Canada | ??.? | |
| ? | 1 | Johannes Viljoen | South Africa | ??.? | |
| 1 | 2 | Willie Walters | South Africa | 22.1 | Q |
| 2 | 2 | Jimmy Ball | Canada | ??.? | Q |
| 3 | 2 | John Hanlon | England | ??.? | |
| 4 | 2 | Wilfred Legg | South Africa | ??.? | |
| ? | 2 | George Golding | Australia | ??.? | |
| ? | 2 | William Simmons | England | ??.? | |
| ? | 2 | Joe Eustace | Ireland | ??.? | |
| 1 | 3 | Werner Gerhardt | South Africa | ??.? | Q |
| 2 | 3 | John Fitzpatrick | Canada | ??.? | Q |
| 3 | 3 | Allan Elliot | New Zealand | ??.? | |
| 4 | 3 | Fred Macbeth | Canada | ??.? | |
| ? | 3 | David Belvin | Bermuda | ??.? | |
| ? | 3 | Art Scott | Canada | ??.? | |
| ? | 3 | Henry Higgins | England | ??.? | |
| ? | 3 | Ian Borland | Scotland | ??.? | |

=== Final ===
| Rank | Name | Nationality | Time | Notes |
|---|---|---|---|---|
| 1st place, gold medalist(s) | Stanley Engelhart | England | 21.8 | |
| 2nd place, silver medalist(s) | John Fitzpatrick | Canada | ??.? | |
| 3rd place, bronze medalist(s) | Willie Walters | South Africa | ??.? | |
| 4 | Roy Hamilton | Scotland | ??.? | |
| 5 | Jimmy Ball | Canada | ??.? | |
| 6 | Werner Gerhardt | South Africa | ??.? | |
