= Athletics at the 1930 British Empire Games – Men's 440 yards =

Men's 440 yards at the Commonwealth Games

The men's 440 yards event at the 1930 British Empire Games was held on 21 and 23 August at the Civic Stadium in Hamilton, Canada.

== Medalists ==
Gold	Silver	Bronze
Alex Wilson; Canada	Willie Walters; South Africa	George Golding; Australia

== Results ==
=== Heats ===
Qualification: First 2 in each heat (Q) qualify directly for the final.

Rank	Heat	Name	Nationality	Time	Notes
1	1	George Golding	Australia	49.6	Q
2	1	Alex Wilson	Canada	??.?	Q
3	1	Ian Borland	Scotland	??.?	
4	1	John Hanlon	England	??.?	
5	1	George Bird	England	??.?	
1	2	Herbert Bascombe	Australia	49.4	Q
2	2	Kenneth Brangwin	England	49.5e	Q
3	2	Stanley Glover	Canada	??.?	
4	2	John Hickey	Canada	??.?	
1	3	Willie Walters	South Africa	49.2	Q
2	3	Jimmy Ball	Canada	49.4e	Q
3	3	Phil Edwards	British Guiana	??.?	
4	3	Walter Connolly	Canada	??.?	
	?	Roger Leigh-Wood	England	DNS	
	?	Wilfred Legg	South Africa	DNS	

=== Final ===
Rank	Name	Nationality	Time	Notes
1st place, gold medalist(s)	Alex Wilson	Canada	48.8	
2nd place, silver medalist(s)	Willie Walters	South Africa	48.9e	+1.5 yd
3rd place, bronze medalist(s)	George Golding	Australia	??.?	
4	Kenneth Brangwin	England	??.?	
5	Jimmy Ball	Canada	??.?	
6	Herbert Bascombe	Australia	??.?	
