= Athletics at the 1930 British Empire Games – Men's 120 yards hurdles =

Men's 120 yards hurdles at the Commonwealth Games

The men's 120 yards hurdles event at the 1930 British Empire Games was held on 21 and 23 August at the Civic Stadium in Hamilton, Canada.

== Medalists ==
Gold	Silver	Bronze
David Burghley; England	Howard Davies; South Africa	Fred Gaby; England

== Results ==
=== Heats ===
Qualification: First 3 in each heat (Q) qualify directly for the final.

Rank	Heat	Name	Nationality	Time	Notes
1	1	Johannes Viljoen	South Africa	14.9	Q
2	1	David Burghley	England	??.?	Q, +inches
3	1	Harry Hart	South Africa	??.?	Q
4	1	Howard Baker	Canada	??.?	
1	2	Howard Davies	South Africa	14.7	Q
2	2	Fred Gaby	England	??.?	Q
3	2	Roland Harper	England	??.?	Q
	?	Bill Pierdon	Canada	DQ	
	?	Art Ravensdale	Canada	DQ	
	?	Francis Foley	England	DNS	

=== Final ===
Rank	Name	Nationality	Time	Notes
1st place, gold medalist(s)	David Burghley	England	14.6	
2nd place, silver medalist(s)	Howard Davies	South Africa	14.7e	
3rd place, bronze medalist(s)	Fred Gaby	England	??.?	
4	Johannes Viljoen	South Africa	??.?	
5	Harry Hart	South Africa	??.?	
6	Roland Harper	England	??.?	
