= Athletics at the 1930 British Empire Games – Men's 100 yards =

Men's 100 yards at the 1930 British Empire Games
- Venue: Civic Stadium, Hamilton, Canada
- Dates: 21–23 August
- Competitors: 16 from 8 nations
- Winning time: 9.9

Medalists
gold medal	Percy Williams	Canada
silver medal	Ernie Page	England
bronze medal	John Fitzpatrick	Canada

The Men's 100-yard dash at the 1930 British Empire Games as part of the athletics programme was held at the Civic Stadium.

The event was competed over 3 heats and a final.

== Result ==
=== Heats ===
Qualification: First 2 in each heat (Q) qualify directly for the final.

Rank	Heat	Name	Nationality	Time	Notes
1	1	John Fitzpatrick	Canada	10.0	Q
2	1	Stanley Engelhart	England	10.2e	Q
3	1	Joe Eustace	Ireland		
4	1	Gerald Halley	Newfoundland		
1	2	Percy Williams	Canada	9.6	Q
2	2	Werner Gerhardt	South Africa	9.9e	Q
3	2	Jim Brown	Canada		
4	2	Roy Hamilton	Scotland		
5	2	David Belvin	Bermuda		
1	3	Ernie Page	England	9.7	Q
2	3	Wilfred Legg	South Africa	9.7e	Q
3	3	Allan Elliot	New Zealand		
4	3	Leigh Miller	Canada		
	?	John Heap	England	DNS	
	?	Ian Borland	Scotland	DNS	
	?	Willie Walters	South Africa	DNS	

=== Final ===
Rank	Name	Nationality	Time	Notes
1st place, gold medalist(s)	Percy Williams	Canada	9.9	
2nd place, silver medalist(s)	Ernie Page	England	10.2e	3 yards
3rd place, bronze medalist(s)	John Fitzpatrick	Canada	10.2e	
4	Wilfred Legg	South Africa		
5	Werner Gerhardt	South Africa		
6	Stanley Engelhart	England		
