= Athletics at the 1930 British Empire Games – Men's shot put =

Men's shot put at the Commonwealth Games

The men's shot put event at the 1930 British Empire Games was held on 21 August at the Civic Stadium in Hamilton, Canada.

== Results ==
Rank	Name	Nationality	Result	Notes
1st place, gold medalist(s)	Harry Hart	South Africa	47 ft 10 in (14.58 m)	
2nd place, silver medalist(s)	Robert Howland	England	44 ft 2 in (13.46 m)	
3rd place, bronze medalist(s)	Charles Hermann	Canada	42 ft 7 in (12.98 m)	
4	Abe Zvonkin	Canada	41 ft 5 1/2 in (12.64 m)	
5	Howard Ford	England	40 ft 9 3/4 in (12.44 m)	
6	Kenneth Pridie	England	40 ft 8 1/4 in (12.40 m)	
	Archie Stewart	Canada	??.??	
	John Cameron	Canada	??.??	
	Francis Foley	England	??.??	
