= Musscher =

Musscher or van Musscher is a Dutch surname that may refer to

- Jacob van Musscher (1580–1623), Dutch painter
- Michiel van Musscher (1645–1705), Dutch painter
- Johannes Hendricus van Musscher (1924–1989), Dutch singer known as Johnny Jordaan
- Steef van Musscher (1902–1986), Dutch Olympic triple jumper
