= Athletics at the 1930 British Empire Games – Men's discus throw =

Men's discus throw at the Commonwealth Games

The men's discus throw event at the 1930 British Empire Games was held on 21 August at the Civic Stadium in Hamilton, Canada.

== Results ==
Rank	Name	Nationality	Result	Notes
1st place, gold medalist(s)	Harry Hart	South Africa	135 ft 11 in (41.43 m)	
2nd place, silver medalist(s)	Charles Hermann	Canada	135 ft 3 in (41.22 m)	
3rd place, bronze medalist(s)	Abe Zvonkin	Canada	135 ft 1 in (41.17 m)	
4	Kenneth Pridie	England	128 ft 8 in (39.22 m)	
5	Malcolm Nokes	England	??.??	
6	Howard Ford	England	??.??	
?	George Sutherland	Canada	??.??	
?	Archie Stewart	Canada	??.??	
?	Robert Howland	England	??.??	
