= George Bird =

George Bird may refer to:

- George Bird (baseball) (1850–1940), American Major League Baseball center fielder
- George Bird (coffee planter) (1792–1857), British coffee planter in Ceylon
- George Bird (cricketer) (1849–1930), English cricketer
- George Bird (athlete) (1900–?), English runner
- George E. Bird (1847–1926), justice of the Maine Supreme Judicial Court
- George William Gregory Bird (1916–1997), British physician and medical researcher
- George Bird Grinnell (1849–1938), American anthropologist, historian, naturalist, and writer

== See also ==
- George Byrd (1926–2010), American conductor
