= Geoffrey Turner (athlete) =

British athlete

Personal information
- Nationality: British (english)
- Born: 16 May 1907 Leigh, England
- Died: 2 May 1932 (aged 24) Leigh, England

Sport
- Sport: Athletics
- Event: High jump
- Club: Earlestown Viaduct AC

Achievements and titles
- Personal best: 1.93 (1929)

Ignatius Geoffrey Barker Turner (16 May 1907 – 2 May 1932) was a British athlete who competed at the 1928 Summer Olympics.

== Biography ==
Turner was the high jump champion of the North for five successive years from 1927 to 1931. He was selected by Great Britain to compete at the 1928 Olympics, where he competed in the men's high jump but was eliminated during qualifying.

His personal best of 1.93 metres set in 1929) propelled him to the top of the European rankings and to equal fifth in the world.

Shortly before the 1930 British Empire Games in Canada, Turner finished second behind Colin Gordon in the high jump event at the 1930 AAA Championships. At the 1930 British Empire Games, he finished 6th in the high jump.

He died of sepsis in 1932.
