= Jim Brown (sprinter) =

Canadian sprinter (1909–2000)

Personal information
- Full name: James Ross Brown
- Nickname: Buster
- Born: August 4, 1909 Cranbrook, British Columbia
- Died: July 7, 2000 (aged 90) Edmonton, Alberta
Medal record
Men's Athletics
Representing Canada
British Empire Games
| Gold medal – first place | 1930 Hamilton | 4×110 yards |

James Ross "Buster" Brown (August 4, 1909 – July 7, 2000) was a Canadian athlete who competed in the 1932 Summer Olympics.

In 1932 he was a member of the Canadian relay team which finished fourth in the Olympic 4×100 metres event.

At the 1930 Empire Games he won the gold medal with the Canadian relay team in the 4×110 yards competition. In the 100 yards contest he was eliminated in the heats. He died in Edmonton in 2000 from complication arising from a broken hip, aged 90.

== Competition record ==
| Year | Competition | Venue | Position | Event | Notes |
Representing Canada
| 1930 | British Empire Games | Hamilton, Canada | 3rd (ht 2) | 100 y | NT |
