= Henry Higgins (sprinter) =

British athlete

Personal information
- Nationality: British (English)
- Born: 29 March 1907 London, England

Sport
- Sport: Athletics
- Event: Sprints
- Club: Surrey AC

Henry George Higgins (29 March 1907 – date of death unknown) was an English athlete who competed at the 1930 British Empire Games.

== Biography ==
Higgins was born in London, England, and was a member of the Surrey Athletic Club.

In 1928 he represented Essex at county level against France and won the 100 yards event.

He represented the England team against Scotland in July 1930 before being selected to represent England at the 1930 British Empire Games in Hamilton, Ontario, where he competed in the 220 yards event. At the time of the Games he was a clerk for a tea broker by trade and lived at 25 Cavenham Gardens in Ilford.
