= St Mary's Church, Slaugham =

St Mary's Church
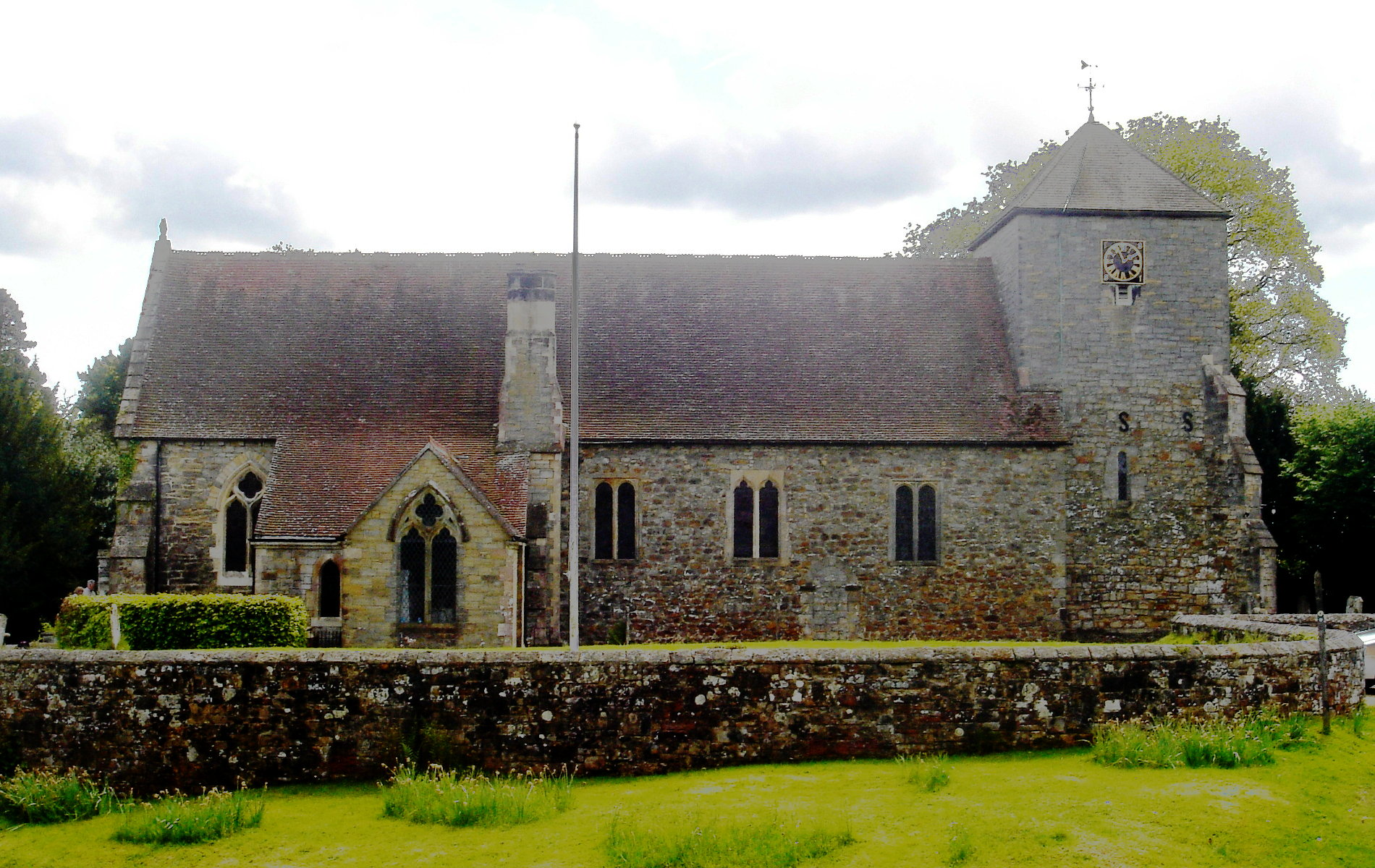
- The church from the north
- St Mary's Church
- 51.0383°N 0.2080°W
- Location: The Green, Slaugham, West Sussex RH17 6AG
- Country: England
- Denomination: Church of England
- Tradition: Open Evangelical
- Website: www.stmarysparish.org.uk

History
- Status: Parish church
- Founded: 12th century
- Dedication: Mary

Architecture
- Functional status: Active
- Heritage designation: Grade II*
- Designated: 10 September 1951
- Style: English Gothic

Administration
- Province: Canterbury
- Diocese: Chichester
- Archdeaconry: Horsham
- Deanery: Rural Deanery of Cuckfield
- Parish: West Weald (Slaugham and Staplefield Common)

St Mary's Church is an Anglican church in the village of Slaugham in Mid Sussex, one of seven local government districts in the English county of West Sussex. The 12th- and 13th-century church, restored in the Victorian era, serves a large rural area of the Sussex Weald, covering three villages (each with current or former chapels of ease of their own) as well as the ancient settlement of Slaugham. It also controlled the church in the market town of Crawley—now one of the area's largest towns—for the first few centuries of its existence. A locally important family built a private chapel in the church in the 17th century, and a series of memorials to deceased family members are considered to be excellent examples of their type. English Heritage has listed the building at Grade II* for its architectural and historical importance.

== History ==
By the time of the Norman Conquest in 1066, the historic county of Sussex was divided into six areas called rapes, each based on a town with a castle. One such division was the Rape of Lewes, which covered a large part of eastern and central Sussex bounded (clockwise from the north) by Surrey, the Rape of Pevensey, the English Channel coast and the Rape of Bramber. The parish of Slaugham, long from north to south but narrow, followed the western boundary of the rape for a long distance. Its manor and village existed in the 11th century: although not mentioned in the Domesday Book of 1086, it was held by William de Warenne's Lewes Priory by 1098 (and possibly from as early as 1091), in common with many manors and estates in central Sussex.

William de Warenne and his wife Gundred supported the construction of churches in the Rape of Lewes, and may have founded a church at Slaugham. No trace of any 11th-century building remains, though, and the existence of a church at that time is a matter of conjecture. The present structure is presumed to be built on top of its foundations. The oldest parts date from the early 12th century and consist of the north wall, a single doorway and other fragmentary remains in the nave, and the font. A chancel would have been built at that time as well to make a simple two-cell church, but no 12th-century fabric survives: it was rebuilt in the early 14th century. Earlier, in the late 13th century, the first stage of the tower had been added at the west end of the church. Its simple entrance door in the west wall is chamfered. The chancel arch, also 13th-century and unusually broad, similarly has chamfering to the walls of the nave. The 13th-century layout of the church was completed when a two-bay south aisle was built in about 1290. It was connected to the nave by means of an unusually wide arcade with chamfered arches. A single lancet window was inserted in the west wall.

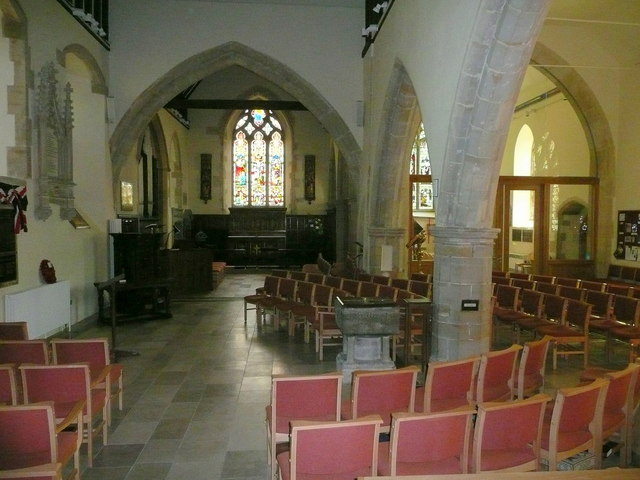
The interior looking towards the east window, showing the wide chancel arch

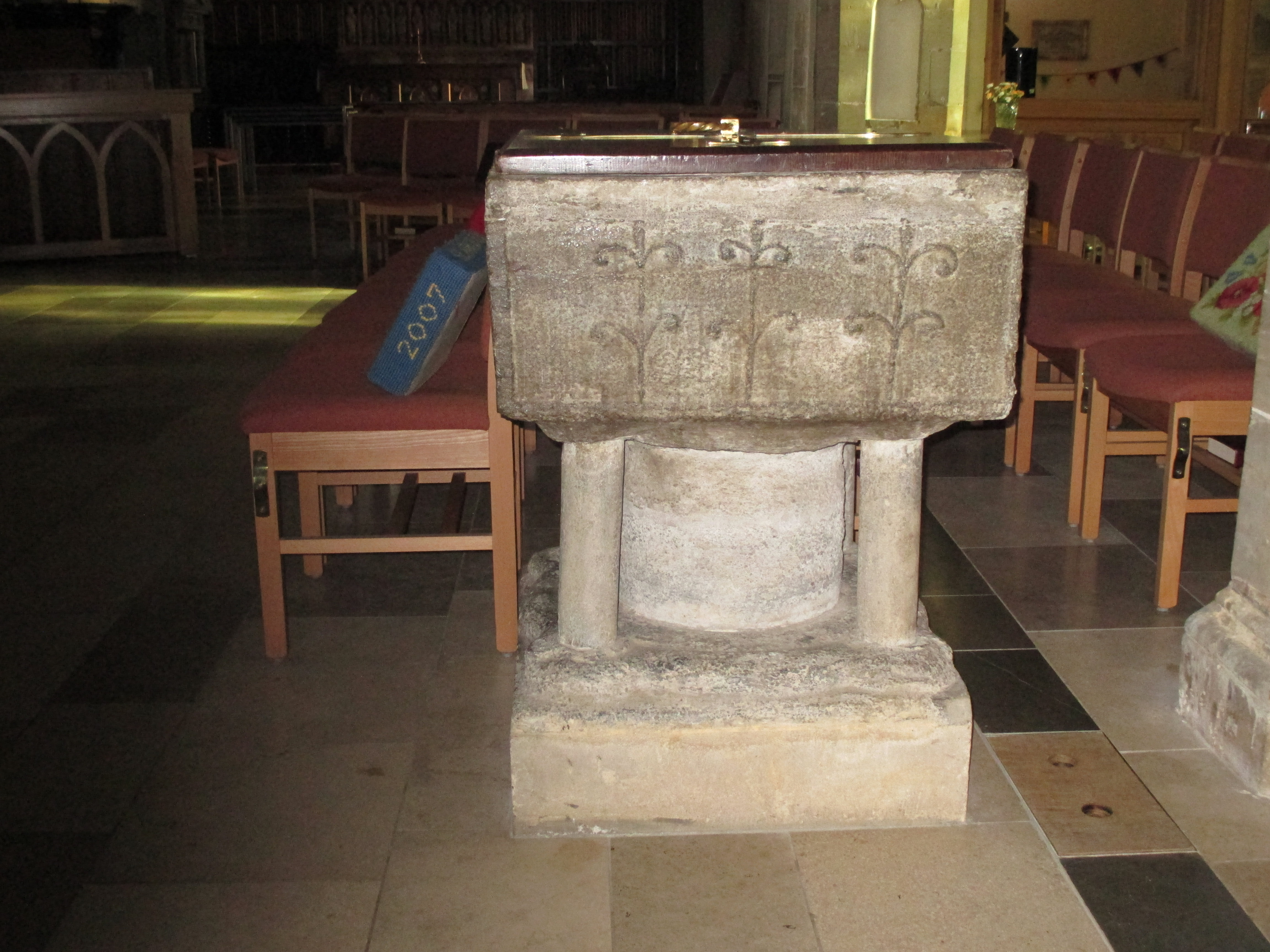
The font

The simple layout was gradually added to over the centuries. The east window in the chancel, in the Decorated Gothic style, dates from the early 14th century. Buttresses were added at the northwest and southwest corners of the tower a century later; and in the 16th century, two square-headed windows were added to the north wall of the nave, flanking the blocked Norman doorway. A major change came in 1613: William Covert, a member of the family who had held the manor of Slaugham since the late 15th century, built a private chapel (the Covert Chapel) on the south side next to the chancel. Its main feature is a memorial of "exceptional quality", considered one of the best in Sussex: it depicts Richard Covert (who died in 1579) kneeling with seventeen other figures representing his wives, sons and daughters. The first letter of each person's name is shown above their head. The intricately carved stone wall-tomb has Corinthian columns, pilasters and a moulded frame, and a straight balustraded top section consisting of an entablature and frieze with carved flowers. Richard Covert himself wears a suit of armour, while his three adult sons have military dress. Both wives are reading prayer books on lecterns. At the top are three funeral helms, two of which bear versions of the Covert coat of arms.

Many churches in Sussex, including Slaugham's, were restored or rebuilt in the Victorian era. Some work had already been carried out on the south aisle in 1827—it was enlarged to hold an extra 200 seats— but most of the work was done between 1857 and 1860 by Gothic Revival architect Joseph Clarke. He added the top section of the tower, widened the south aisle further and removed most of the wall between it and the Covert Chapel (creating an archway instead), added a third bay between the chancel and the Covert Chapel, and built a vestry and organ chamber on the north side. In the west wall of the south aisle, a 13th-century lancet window remains, but Clarke added a rose window. Alterations continued later in the 19th century: a second vestry was built on the north side in 1879, the organ was moved again, and the tower was given a clock-face in 1881. A 17th-century pulpit was donated to the church and installed in 1890.

The churchyard is very large, reflecting the size of the parish. Burials include Catherine Matcham, one of Lord Nelson's sisters; and a table-tomb dated 1615 is one of the oldest such graves in Sussex. There are also wooden graveboards, sometimes used as a cheaper alternative to gravestones, and a pair of gate-like iron grave-markers. The lychgate at the north entrance was erected in 1903. A very broad yew tree, known to be over 600 years old, occupies part of the churchyard behind the church.

Eccentric and bad behaviour by clergy and parishioners was a common theme at Slaugham in earlier centuries. Church attendance was made compulsory after the changes brought about by the English Reformation of the late 16th century, and especially in the early years detailed records would be kept of non-attendance or inappropriate behaviour in church. Ecclesiastical court records show that St Mary's Church was the scene of a violent crime in 1601, when Richard Woods was "charged with breaking Thomas Mutton's head in the churche" [sic]; while on 29 June 1621 another man was found beating his wife instead of attending the Sunday service. In 1857, when Reverend Sergison was the vicar at St Mary's, a disagreement developed over some of the pews. He overcame the problem by paying some boys to enter the church and burn the pews in question. The half-crown bribe was successful in keeping his actions secret until after his death.

St Mary's Church was listed at Grade II* by English Heritage on 28 October 1957. Such buildings are defined as being "particularly important ... [and] of more than special interest". In February 2001, it was one of 54 Grade II* listed buildings, and 1,028 listed buildings of all grades, in the district of Mid Sussex.

== Architecture and fittings ==
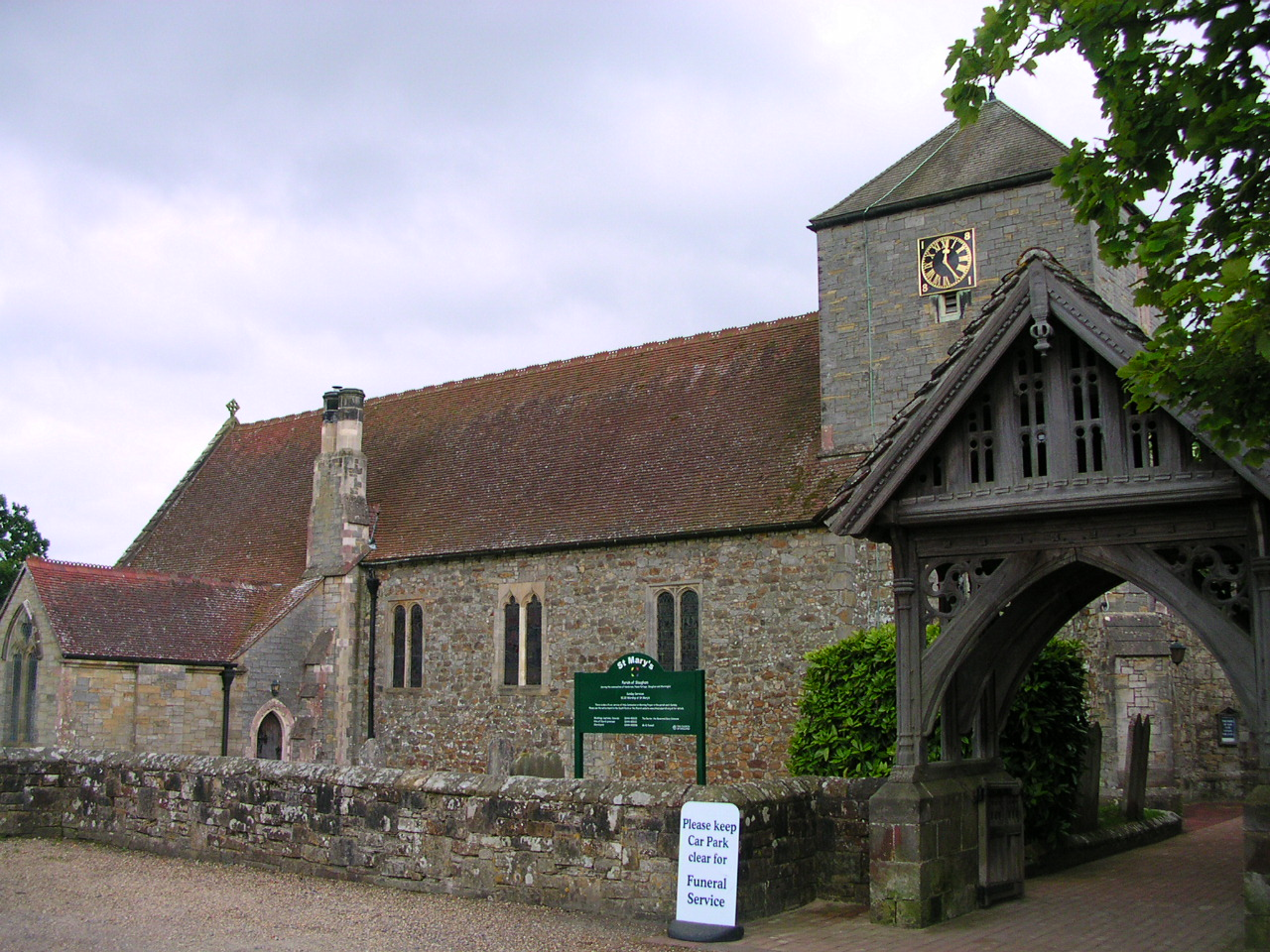
St Mary's Church from the northwest, showing the wooden lychgate at right

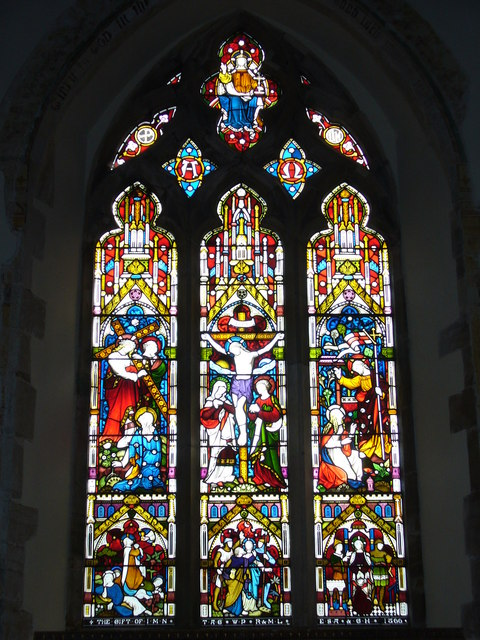
The east window

St Mary's Church does not have a homogeneous external appearance and cannot be attributed to one era: the gradual change and growth of the building over the centuries is more apparent. The plan consists of a west tower with an entrance, chancel with a wide chancel arch, nave with an aisle on the south side, south (Covert) chapel next to the chancel, south porch, two vestries and an organ chamber. Sussex stone rubble is the main building material, although there is some ashlar as well (for instance in the walls of the Covert Chapel). Slates and tiles, some of Horsham stone, are laid on the roofs. The chancel roof retains a single 14th-century tie-beam but has otherwise been renewed.

The east window of the chancel is an early-14th-century lancet with three trefoils. The exterior is hood-moulded. The north wall of the chancel also has a lancet window: this has quatrefoils and ogee headings. The Covert Chapel has three windows, all with pointed-arched heads: that in the east wall has three cinquefoils (five-lobed lights), while the two in the south wall are simpler two-light windows. The nave's north wall has one 19th-century window flanked by two dating from the 16th century and the blocked Norman doorway. All three are simple two-light windows with straight heads. Two windows in the south aisle also date from the Victorian restoration, as does the single window in the west wall. Charles Eamer Kempe designed several stained glass windows for the church in the 1890s.

The tower rises in three stages, of which the lower two are local rubble and the upper (Victorian) part is of ashlar. The horizontal divide can still be discerned. Diagonally splayed buttresses were added at the northwest and southwest corners in the 15th century. Only the lowest and highest storey have windows. There is a single-light trefoiled lancet above the entrance and small round-arched windows in the side wall on the lowest storey; at the top the north wall has a clock and there are 19th-century lancets in the other three faces. This section also holds a ring of eight bells hung for change ringing. There were originally five bells cast in 1773 by Thomas Janaway; two of these remain as the second and third of the present ring of eight, for which the other bells were cast in 1934 by Gillett & Johnston. The tower is topped by a pyramid-style tiled roof.

Memorials and monuments are the principal architectural feature of the church. As well as the 1579 memorial to Richard Covert (designed by a sculptor called Flynton at a cost of £30 (£11,000 in 2025)), the Covert Chapel has a 26-inch (66 cm) brass monument representing John Covert (who died in 1503); it sits below a brass canopy. In the chancel, a recess forms an Easter sepulchre containing brass monuments to an earlier Richard Covert (who died in 1546) and his three wives with a depiction of the Resurrection of Jesus, and next to it a memorial to his granddaughter Jane Covert in a columned surround topped with a pediment. Nelson's sister Catherine Matcham has a wall-mounted memorial in the east end of the chancel.

The interior had 12th-century wall paintings, a common feature of Sussex churches. These do not survive, but illustrations of the scenes (which represented the Passion) exist. One surviving feature from the 12th century is the square font of local marble, which now stands on a modern base but retains many original features including a carved fish design (unique in Sussex), arcades and tendril-style ornamentation. A 15th-century altarpiece was removed from the church and installed in St Laurence's Church in Goring-by-Sea near Worthing when that church was built in the 1930s.

== Parish ==
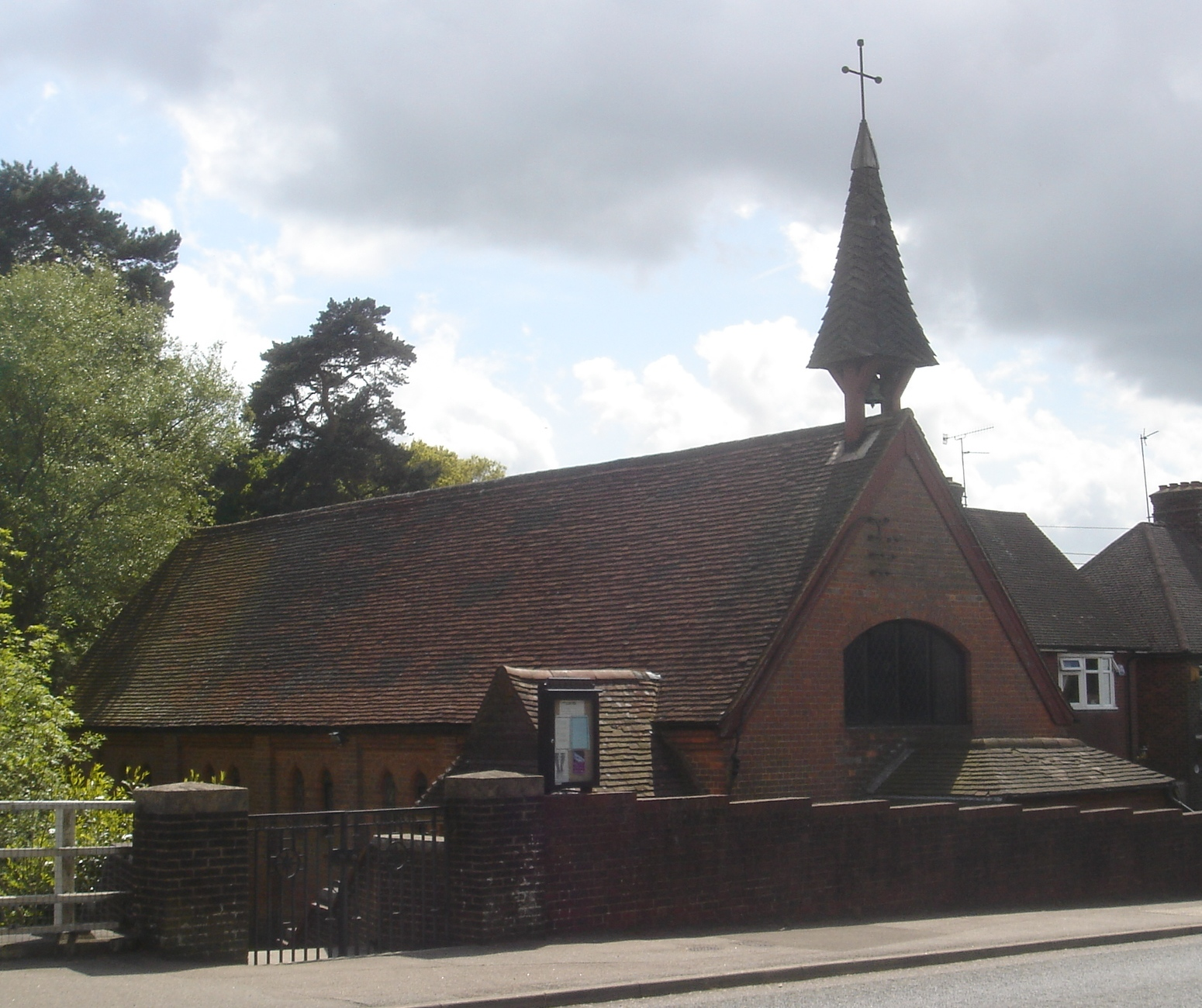
All Saints’ Church, Handcross

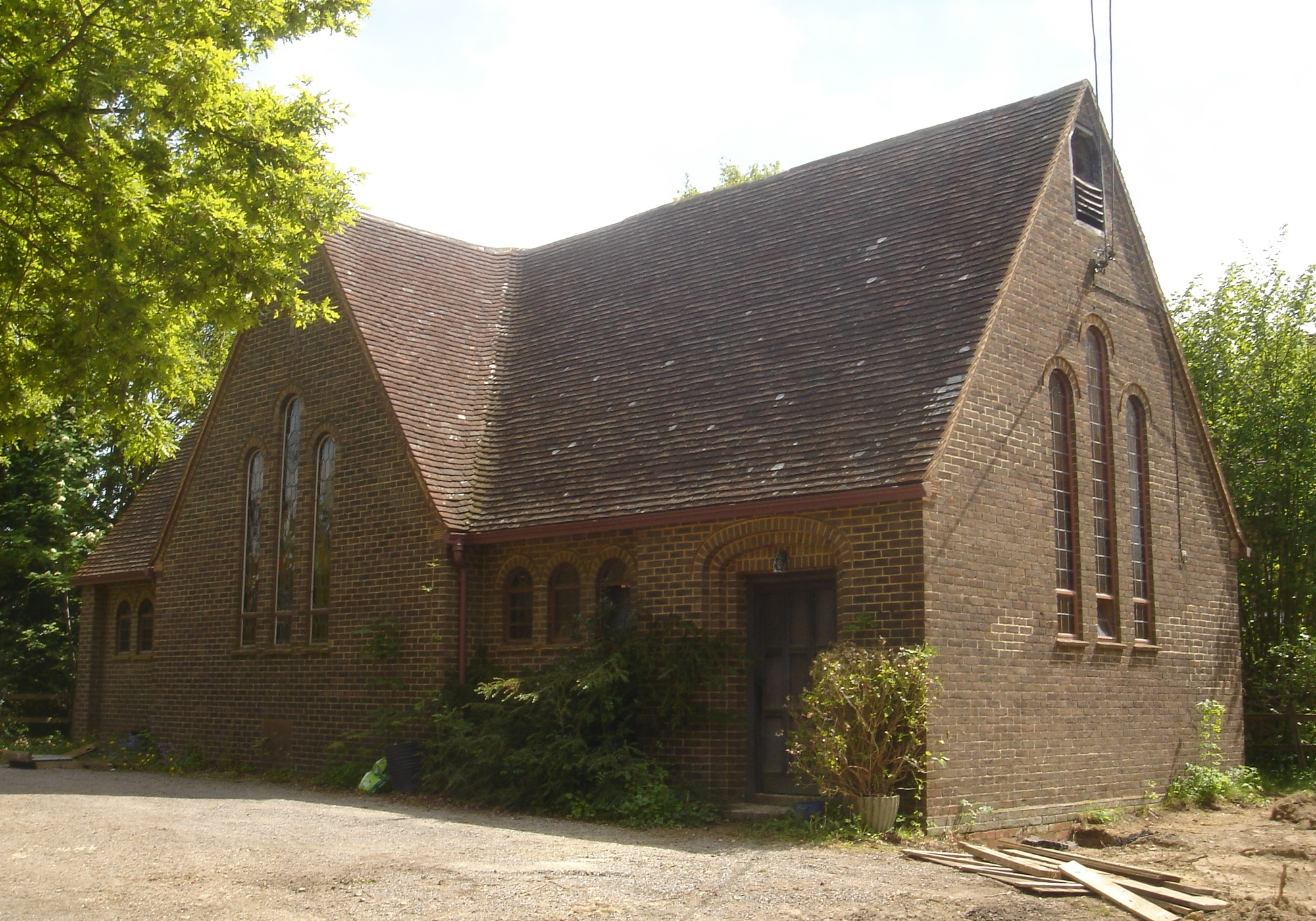
Former St Andrew's Church, Warninglid

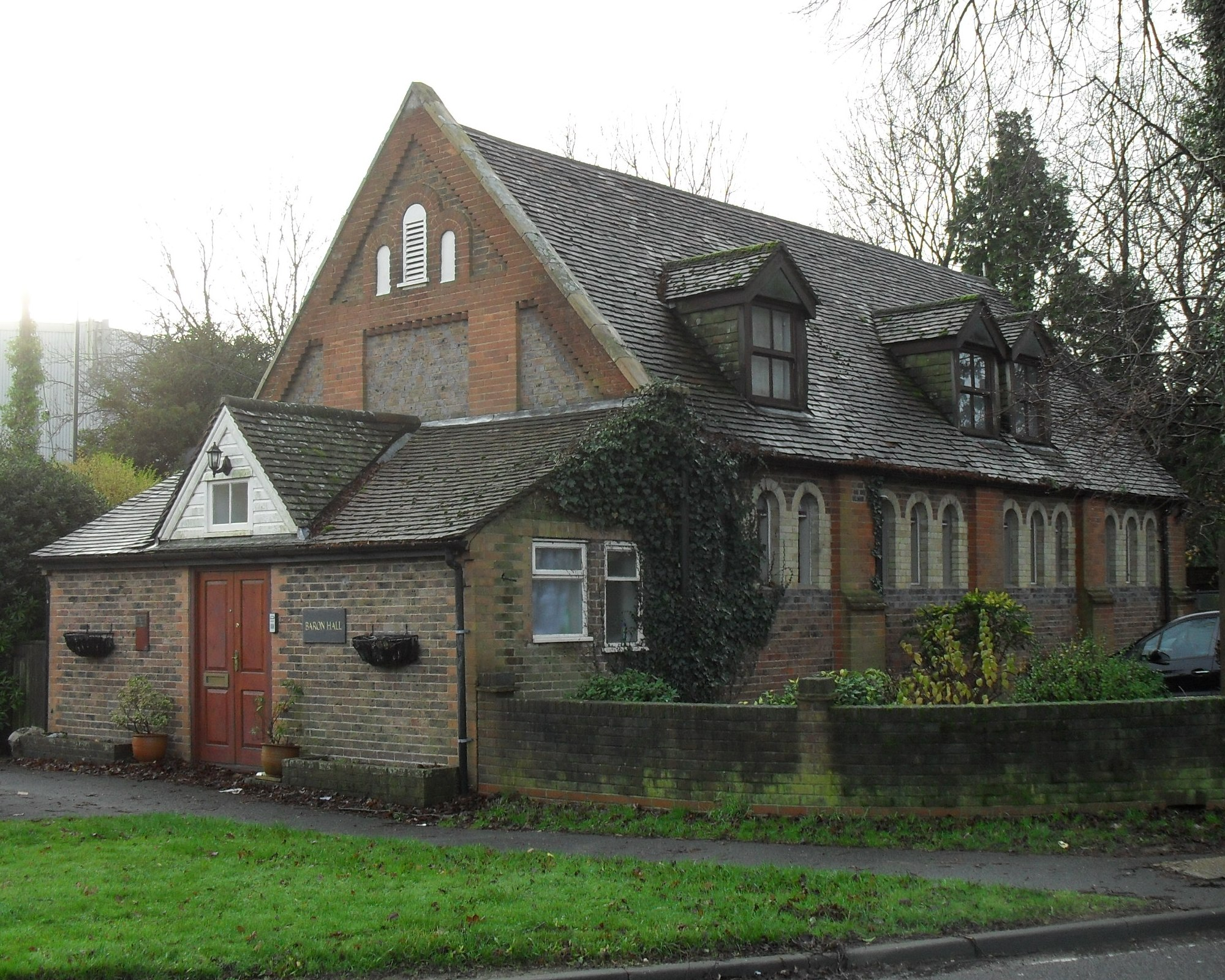
Former Church of the Ascension, Pease Pottage

Slaugham has always been a large parish: it covered 5,482 acres (2,218 ha) in 1940, most of which was sparsely populated Wealden countryside. The three other villages in the parish – Handcross, Pease Pottage and Warninglid – each had their own chapel of ease for Anglican worship, controlled from St Mary's Church; the three buildings survive, but only one is still in religious use.

Handcross is a linear village of mostly Victorian buildings on the old London–Brighton road. All Saints’ Church, at 51.0525°N 0.2023°W on the road to Horsham, is a small structure of red brick with a large, distinctive bell-turret at its west end. When the A23 London–Brighton road was diverted in the late 1950s to run past the village and widened at the same time, the church had to give up some of its land. The tiny building now sits next to an overbridge and overhangs the bypass.

Warninglid, a hamlet with one main street, is 1.25 miles (2 km) south of Slaugham in the south of the parish. Architect Francis G. Troup designed a basic chapel of ease for the community in 1935, about a century after one had first been suggested. The cruciform structure was of brick and had some vividly coloured stained glass by J. Hogan of the firm James Powell and Sons, a long-established London-based stained glass company. The chapel, which cost £1,200 (£74,000 in 2025) and had a tall vaulted interior lit by lancets, was sold in 2009, and Mid Sussex District Council gave planning permission for its conversion into a house. It stands at 51.0206°N 0.2179°W on the road to Cuckfield.

Pease Pottage is a small village on the southern edge of Crawley, separated from it only by the A264 road. A chapel of ease to St Mary's, later called the Church of the Ascension, was granted a licence in 1875. The small Gothic Revival-style building, at 51.0831°N 0.2030°W, has been converted into an office. It has multicoloured brickwork, a bell-turret and round-arched windows.

Crawley, north of Pease Pottage on the London–Brighton road, developed as a market town from 1202, when its market charter was granted. It was just within the Rape of Lewes (the boundary with the Rape of Bramber ran up the middle of the London–Brighton road), and at first lay within Slaugham's parish. Soon after the market was founded, the long-established Poynings family were granted most of the land in the area by the descendants of William de Warenne; and by 1267, they had founded a chapel of ease at Crawley. It later became a chantry for the benefit of the Poynings family, members of which held the manor and lordship of Crawley until 1429 when the last descendant died. The church was later dedicated to St John the Baptist and opened for public worship in the growing town. It remained a daughter church to St Mary's Church at Slaugham until the 16th century, although in practice the relationship lapsed somewhat earlier and St John the Baptist's was effectively an independent parish church. St John the Baptist's Church is still the Anglican parish church of Crawley, and has Grade II* listed status.

The approximate north and east boundaries of Slaugham's present-day parish are the M23 motorway, part of the main railway line between Balcombe and Three Bridges, the B2110 road and the A23 road; on the south and west sides, field boundaries and minor roads form the border with adjacent parishes.

== See also ==
- List of places of worship in Mid Sussex
