= Olle Hallberg =

Swedish long jumper

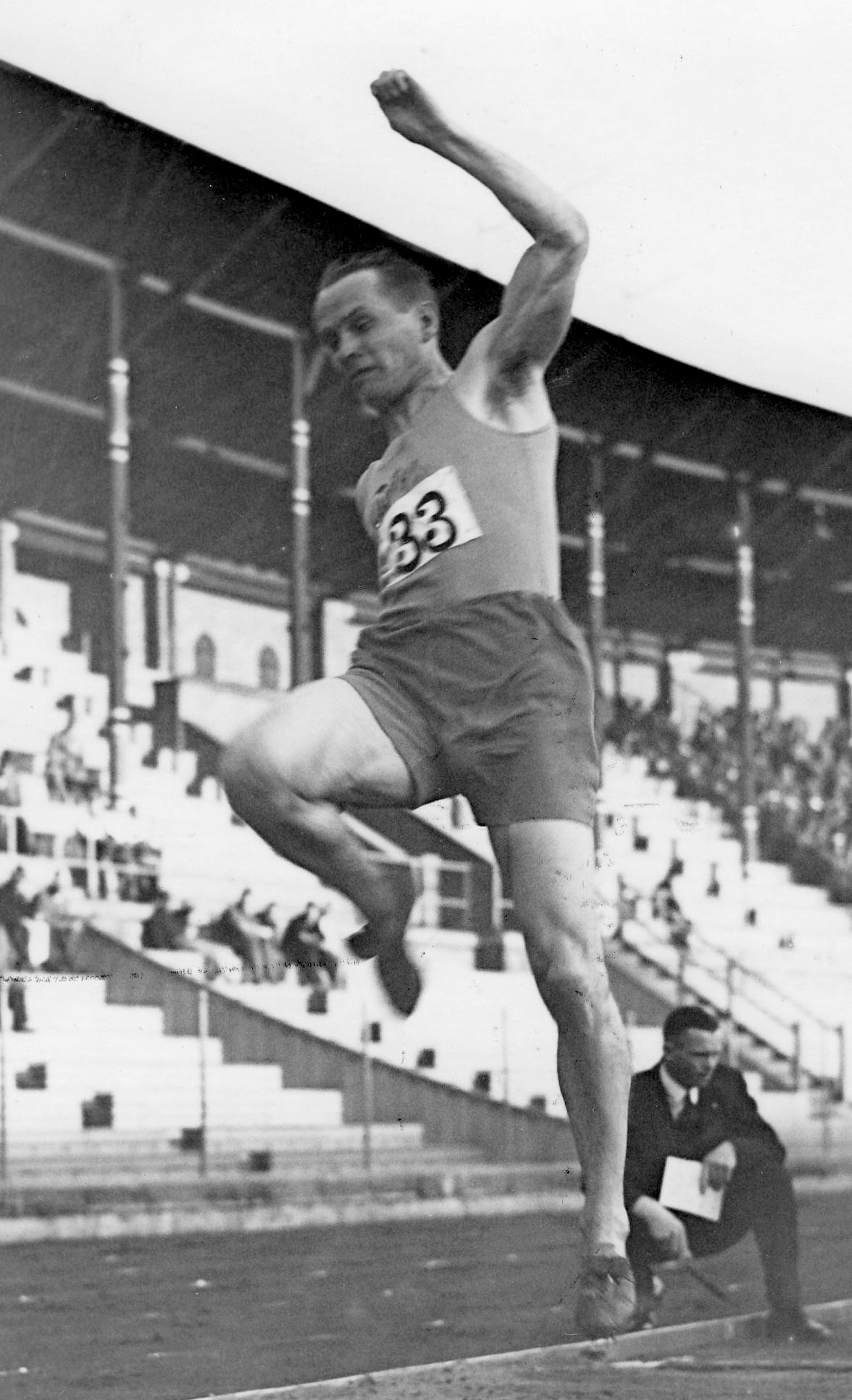

Personal information
- Born: 13 July 1903 Brunflo, Sweden
- Died: 31 January 1996 (aged 92) Östersund, Sweden
- Height: 1.89 m (6 ft 2 in)
- Weight: 73 kg (161 lb)

Sport
- Sport: Athletics
- Event: Long jump
- Club: IF Castor, Östersund

Achievements and titles
- Personal best: 7.51 m (1929)

Olof Hjalmar Hallberg also known as Olle Hallberg (13 July 1903 – 31 January 1996) was a Swedish long jumper who competed at the 1928 Summer Olympics.

== Biography ==
At the 1928 Olympics, he finished in 10th place in the long jump event.

Hallberg won the Swedish title in 1925–30, 1932 and 1934. For some time he shared the Swedish national record of 7.53 m with Erik Svensson, and was a member of Swedish Athletics Association.

Hallberg won the British AAA Championships title in the long jump event at the 1930 AAA Championships.
