= Roy Hamilton (athlete) =

Scottish athlete (c.1907–??)

Personal information
- Nationality: British (Scottish)
- Born: c.1907

Sport
- Sport: Athletics
- Event: Sprints
- Club: The Glasgow Academy AC; Glasgow Harriers

Robert Hamilton known as Roy (c.1907 – date of death unknown) was a track and field athlete from Scotland who competed at the 1930 British Empire Games (now Commonwealth Games).

== Biography ==
Hamilton attended The Glasgow Academy and was a member of their Athletics Club, in addition to being a member of the Glasgow Harriers. He won the 1929 Scottish AAA Championship 220 yards title and the following year he finished runner-up in the 100 and was unplaced in defending his 220 yards title at the 1930 Scottish AAA's.

Leaving Scotland on the Anchor-Donaldson liner Audania, he arrived in Canada as part of the Scottish Empire Games team at the 1930 British Empire Games in Hamilton, Ontario, Canada, where he participated in two events, the 100 yards and the 220 yards. At the time of the Games he was 23 years old and living at 49 Manse Road in Kilsyth and was a veterinary student by profession.

Hamilton became a well-known athlete in Scotland during the 1930s and was also proficient as a golfer.
