= 1930 AAA Championships =

Outdoor track and field competition

- Dates: 4–5 July 1930
- Host city: London, England
- Venue: Stamford Bridge
- Level: Senior
- Type: Outdoor
- Events: 24

The 1930 AAA Championships was the 1930 edition of the annual outdoor track and field competition organised by the Amateur Athletic Association (AAA). It was held from 4 to 5 July 1930 at Stamford Bridge in London, England.

The Championships consisted of 24 events and covered two days of competition. The marathon was held from Windsor to Stamford Bridge.

== Results ==
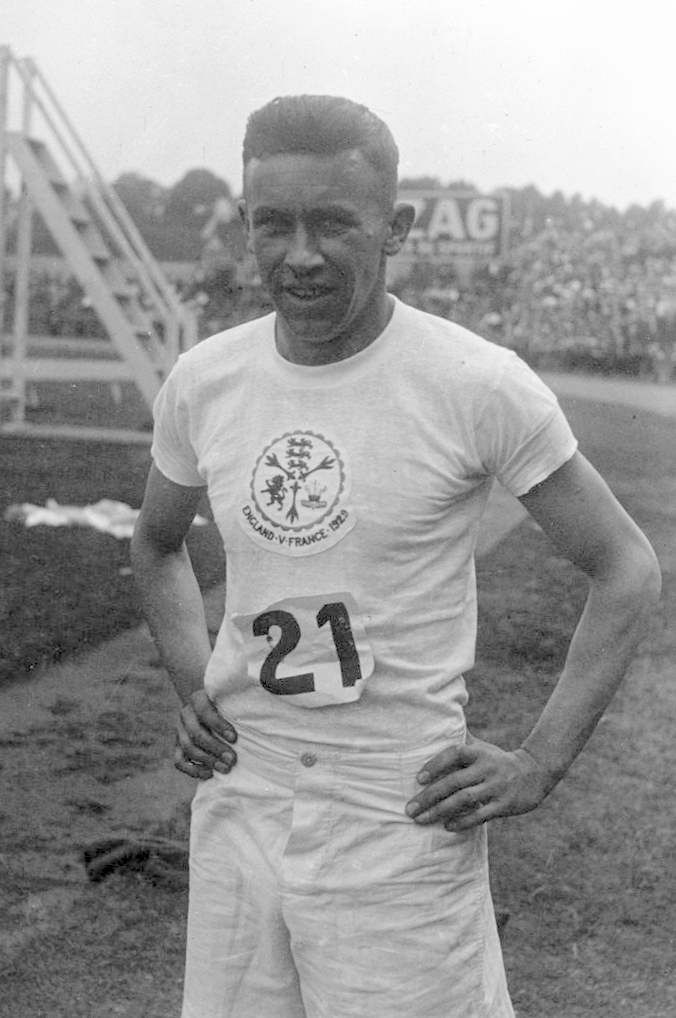
Reg Thomas won the mile

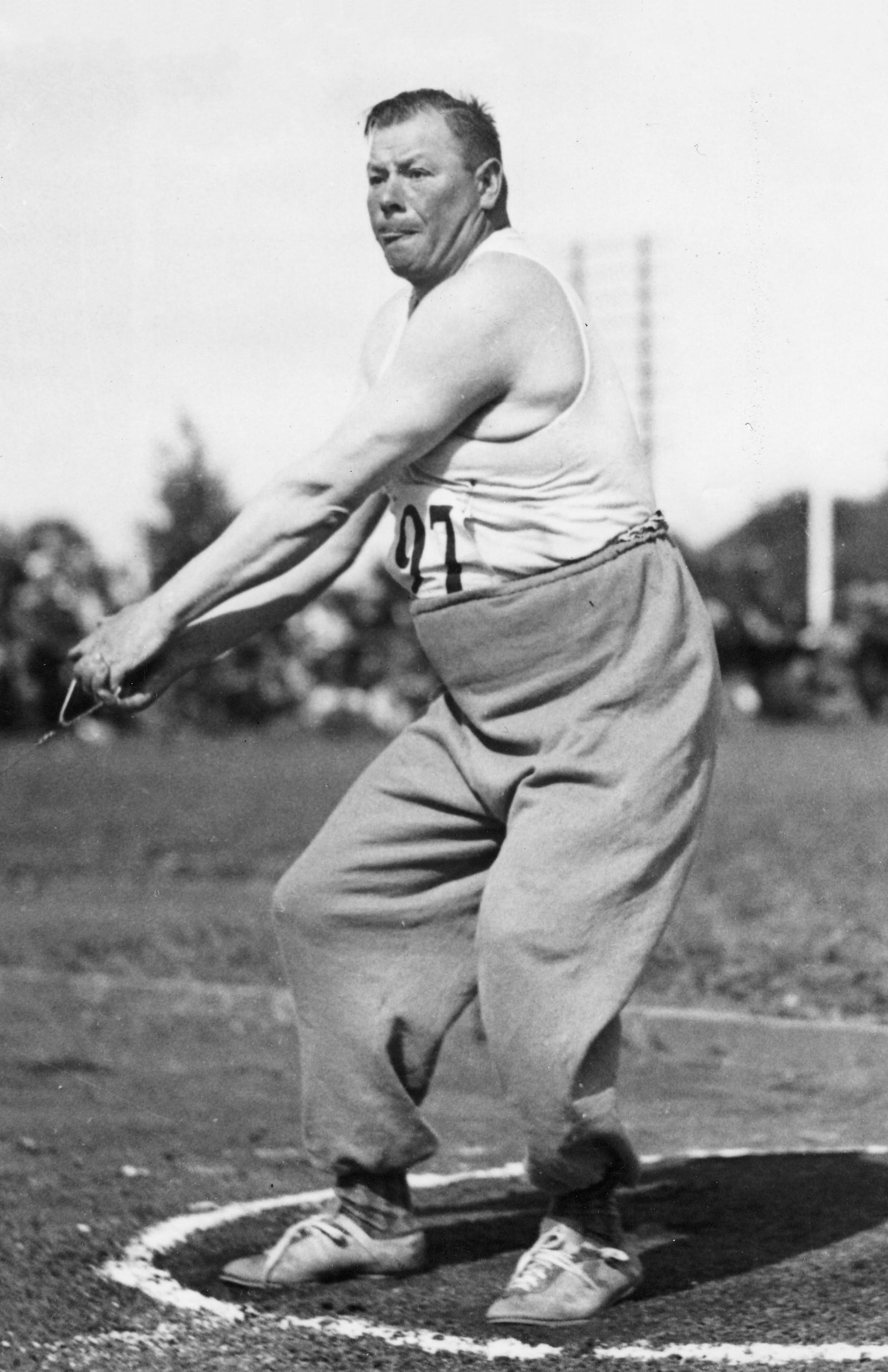
Swede Ossian Skiöld won the hammer throw

Event	Gold		Silver		Bronze	
100 yards	(Netherlands) Christiaan Berger	9.9	(Italy) Edgardo Toetti	inches	Stanley Engelhart	1 yd
220 yards	Stanley Engelhart	22.0	(Netherlands) Christiaan Berger	2½ yd	John Hanlon	1½ yd
440 yards	Kenneth Brangwin	49.8	John Hanlon	2 yd	George Bird	2½ yd
880 yards	Tommy Hampson	1:53.2 NR	(France) Séra Martin	1:54.8	Cyril Ellis	1:55.0
1 mile	(Wales) Reg Thomas	4:15.2	Jerry Cornes	4:18.0	(Italy) Luigi Beccali	20 yd
4 miles	(Finland) Lauri Virtanen	19:36.2	Brian Oddie	20:02.4	(Scotland) James Wood	20:03.6
10 miles	Jack Winfield	53:05.4	Ernest Harper	53:06.4	Thomas Evenson	53:20.0
marathon	(Scotland) Dunky Wright	2:38:29.4	(Finland) Martti Marttelin	2:38:35.0	(Northern Ireland) Sam Ferris	2:41:46.4
steeplechase	George Bailey	10:55.4	Jack Webster	10:58.2	Edward Oliver	11:18.6
120y hurdles	Lord Burghley	15.2	Frederick Gaby	2½ yd	Francis Foley	½ yd
440y hurdles	Lord Burghley	53.8 NR	(Italy) Luigi Facelli	53.8	Douglas Neame	1 yd
2 miles walk	Cecil Hyde	13:56.4	Bert Cooper	14:07.2	(Scotland) George Galloway	
7 miles walk	Cecil Hyde	53:32.6	Albert Plumb	54:01.4	Tommy Green	54:16.4
high jump	(Guyana) Colin Gordon	1.854	Edward Bradbrooke; Geoffrey Turner	1.829; 1.829	n/a	
pole jump	(Sweden) Henry Lindblad (Netherlands) Age van der Zee	3.73	n/a		Bernard Babington Smith	3.66
long jump	(Sweden) Olle Hallberg	7.36	(Netherlands) Hannes de Boer	7.30	(Netherlands) Willem Peters	7.07
triple jump	(Netherlands) Willem Peters	15.10	(Netherlands) Steef van Musscher	14.01	Arthur Gray	13.70
shot put	(France) Jules Noël	13.76	Robert Howland	13.54	Kenneth Pridie	13.10
discus throw	(France) Jules Noël	44.66	(Sweden) Anton Karlsson	43.35	(Norway) Ketil Askildt	41.52
hammer throw	(Sweden) Ossian Skiöld	51.14	(Italy) Armando Poggioli	47.16	Malcolm Nokes	45.62
javelin throw	(Italy) Alberto Dominutti	61.60	(Norway) Karl Granli	58.87	Robert Turner	56.89 NR
440 yards relay	Polytechnic Harriers	43.3-5 sec	Surrey AC	inches	HAV Haarlem	2½ yd
Tug of war (100 st)	Royal Marines Portsmouth		Luton Police		Birchley Rolling Mills; RN Barracks Chatham	
Tug of war (catch weight)	Luton Borough Police		B Div MPAC			

== See also ==
- 1930 WAAA Championships
