= Ralph Adams (sprinter) =

Canadian sprinter (1907–1976)

Medal record

Men's Athletics

British Empire Games
Gold medal – first place	1930 Hamilton	4×110 yards

Ralph Andrew Adams (born July 9, 1907, date of death 1976) was a Canadian athlete who competed in the 1928 Summer Olympics.

He was born in Hamilton, Ontario.

In 1928 he was eliminated in the quarter-finals of the 100 metres event as well as of the 200 metres competition. He was also a member of the Canadian relay team which was disqualified in the final of the 4×100 metres contest.

At the 1930 Empire Games he won the gold medal with the Canadian relay team in the 4×110 yards event. In the 220 yards competition he was eliminated in the heats.

== Competition record ==
Year	Competition	Venue	Position	Event	Notes
Representing Canada
1930	British Empire Games	Hamilton, Ontario	1st heat	220 y	NT
