= George Bird (athlete) =

British athlete (1900–1977)

Personal information
- Nationality: British (English)
- Born: 3 May 1900 London, England
- Died: 30 April 1977 (aged 77)

Sport
- Sport: Athletics
- Event: 440 yards
- Club: Finchley Harriers

George Thomas Bird (3 May 1900 – 30 April 1977) was an English runner.

== Biography ==
Bird served as a 2nd Lieutenant in the Royal Air Force during World War I.

Shortly before the 1930 British Empire Games in Canada, Bird finished third behind Kenneth Brangwin in the 440 yards event at the 1930 AAA Championships.

Bird competed in the 440 yards at the 1930 British Empire Games for England. At the time of the Games, Bird was a clerk by trade and lived at 116 Farmers Road, Kennington, London.
