= Steef van Musscher =

Dutch triple jumper

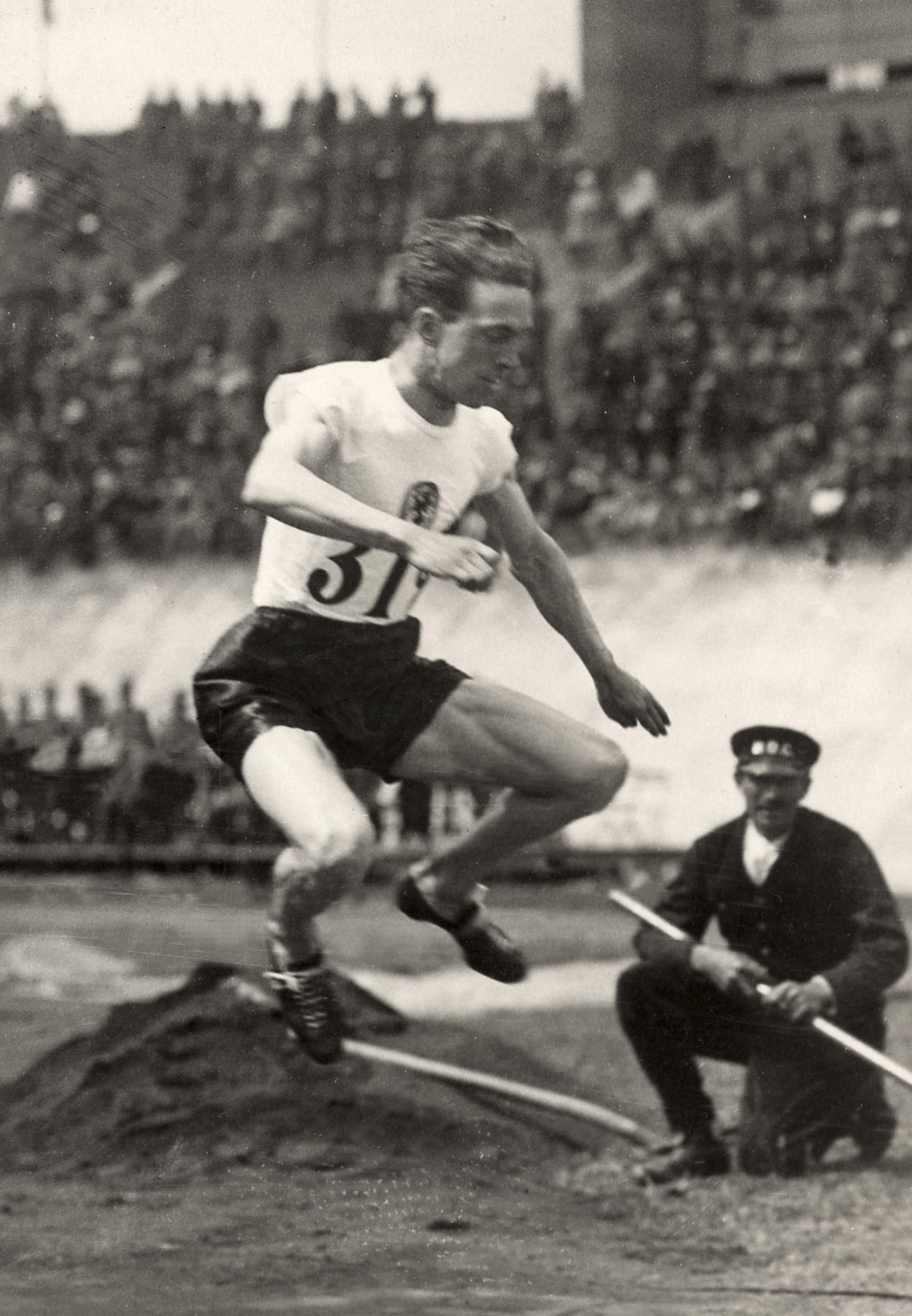
- Steef van Musscher in 1928

Personal information
- Full name: Steven van Musscher
- Born: 26 February 1902 Haarlem, the Netherlands
- Died: 14 May 1986 (aged 84) Rotterdam, the Netherlands

Sport
- Sport: Triple jump
- Club: AV Haarlem

Achievements and titles
- Olympic finals: 1928

Steven van Musscher also known as Steef van Musscher (26 February 1902 – 14 May 1986) was a Dutch triple jumper who competed at the 1928 Summer Olympics.

== Biography ==
At the 1928 Olympic Games, van Musscher finished in 15th place in the triple jump event.

In 1930 he set his personal best jump at 14.13 m. Van Musscher finished second behind fellow Dutchman Willem Peters in the triple jump event at the 1930 AAA Championships.
