= Pease Pottage =

Village in West Sussex, England

Coordinates: 51.0832°N 0.2009°W

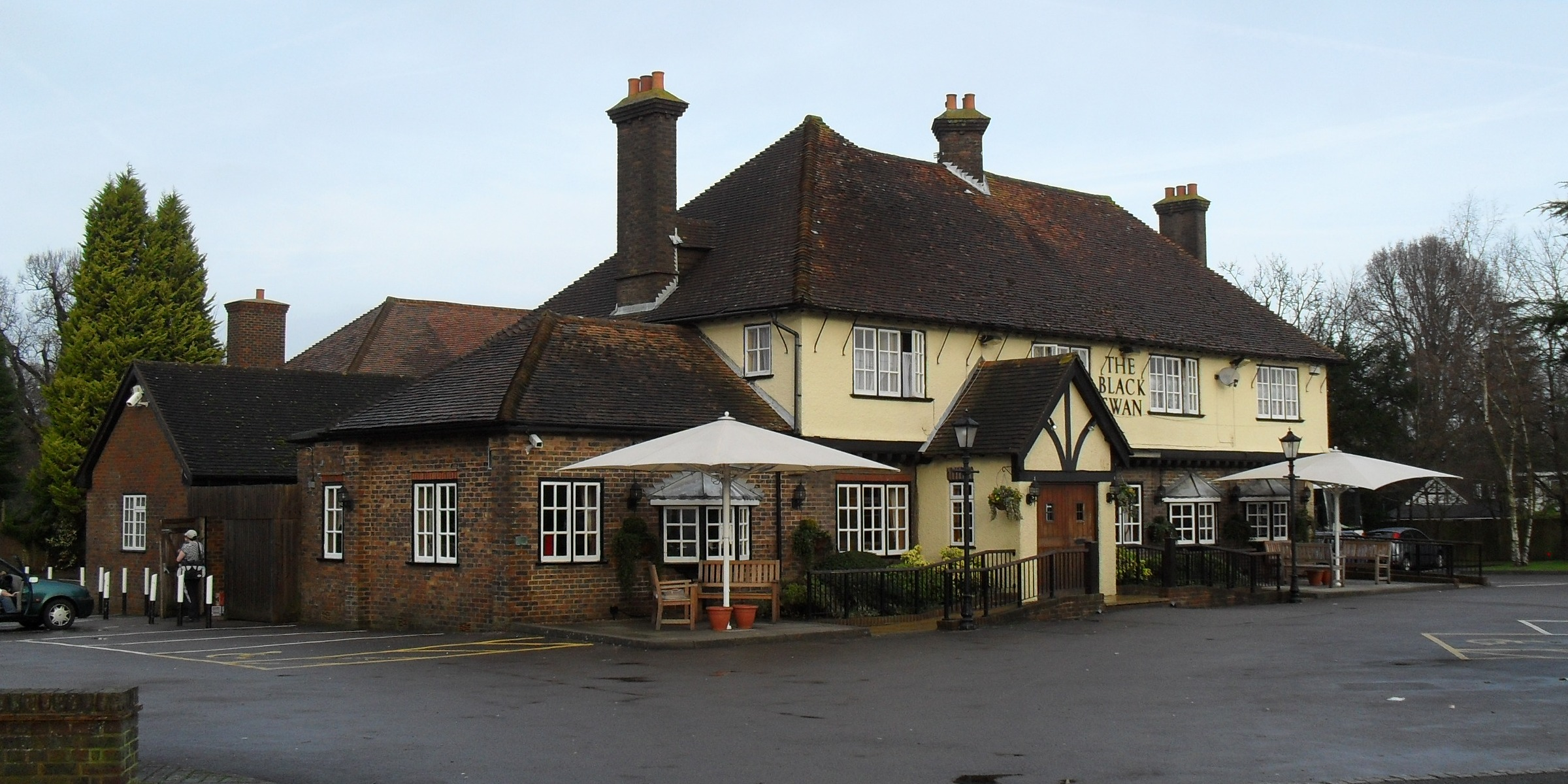
- The Black Swan Inn in the centre of the village

- Location within West Sussex
- Area: 0.9284 km^{2} (0.3585 sq mi)
- Population: 1,691
  - Density: 1,821
- Language: English
- OS grid reference: TQ255325
- Civil parish: Slaugham
- District: Mid Sussex
- Shire county: West Sussex
- Region: South East
- Country: England
- Sovereign state: United Kingdom
- Post town: Crawley
- Postcode district: RH11
- Dialling code: 01293
- Police: Sussex
- Fire: West Sussex
- Ambulance: South East Coast
- UK Parliament: Horsham

Pease Pottage is a village in the Mid Sussex District of West Sussex, England. It lies on the southern edge of the Crawley built-up area, in the civil parish of Slaugham.

The village has a motorway service station, named after the village, which also serves as a local shop for the residents of the village (a footpath was constructed to allow pedestrian access from the village). It is located at the junction of the M23 and the A23 on the London to Brighton road, where the A264 to Horsham joins.

The Church of the Ascension, a chapel of ease to St Mary's Church, Slaugham, opened in 1875, but is no longer in use.

Pease Pottage Radar is about 1/2 mi (0.8 km) west of Pease Pottage and is visible from much of the village. It is an air traffic control radar for NATS and takes advantage of a position 460 feet (140 m) above sea level, some 250 feet (76 m) above the nearby Gatwick Airport.

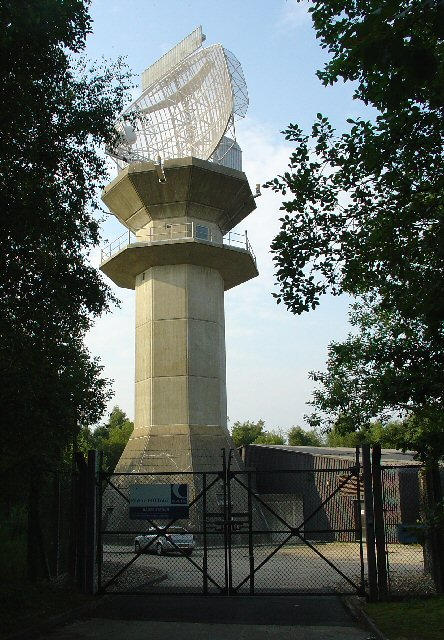
The Pease Pottage radar

== Etymology ==
Pease Pottage is also an old name for pease pudding. It has been said that the village name came from serving this food to convicts either on their way from London to the South Coast or from East Grinstead to Horsham although this seems implausible and it is not clear why convicts would travel along either route. The name Peaspottage Gate first appears on Budgen's Map of Sussex made in 1724 at the southern end of a road from Crawley where it met the Ridgeway, and is on the border of the parishes of Slaugham and Worth. This is prior to the turnpikes (1771), and so was not a toll gate. It was probably a gate between St Leonard's Forest and Tilgate Forest (part of Worth Forest), and probably a reference to soft muddy ground. Many local villages have Gate as part of the name (Tilgate, Colgate, Faygate etc.). The name is not on John Speed's map of 1610 (surveyed in the 1590s). Gate was dropped from the name when the tollgate was removed in 1877.

== Geography and history ==
Pease Pottage is situated on the Forest Ridge of the High Weald. This ridge is formed from the resistant sandstones and thin clays of the Cretaceous Hastings Beds and stretches from Horsham in the west to reach the English Channel coast in the east between Hastings and Rye. The ridge is narrow to the west of Pease Pottage but widens to the east. Wet Weald Clay forms the low ground to the north and south of the ridge. The sandstone provides good drainage and many microliths have been found dating from the Mesolithic Age. The Horsham Culture is believed to have lasted about 2,000 years. Neolithic flints from the South Downs have been found to the east along Parish Lane. To the west are three Bronze Age tumuli.

Pease Pottage lies on an ancient, pre-Roman trackway that ran in an east to west direction along the Forest Ridge from Ashdown Forest through West Hoathly, Turners Hill and Pease Pottage to Horsham. This pre-historic ridgeway pre-dated the predominantly north–south-oriented Roman roads built by the Romans to link the south coast of England to London, and to connect with the strategically important Wealden iron industry, such as the London to Brighton trunk road 5 miles (8.0 km) east of Pease Pottage and Stane Street further to the west. The ridgeway, running as it did in an east–west direction across the Weald, was probably of long-standing importance and of great antiquity. The route can be traced on Ordnance Survey maps and can be discerned on the ground in various places e.g. as an old sunken trackway running through Worth Forest east of Pease Pottage.

The only evidence from Saxon times comes from the political structures. The Middle Saxons extended south from the Thames valley and created the sub-kingdom of Sudergeona (Surrey). The South Saxons populated the south coast. In between was a great forest known as the Andreaswald. The wet Wealden clay and dense undergrowth made this relatively inaccessible except by river, and so the Sussex Rapes were formed along the river valleys. The River Ouse was navigable for small boats from Lewes up to Cuckfield from where higher drier ground and less dense vegetation made progress north easier. Thus the Rape of Lewes extended as far north as modern Crawley. The rapes were sub-divided in hundreds, and the area now known as Pease Pottage was in the Hundred of Buttinghill. Slaugham is first mentioned around 1095 when the tithes were granted to the Priory of St Pancras in Lewes. The church dates from the early 12th century.

The first large scale map of Sussex by Christopher Saxton in 1575 shows Crawley and Slaugham churches, St. Leonard's Forest and Worth Forest, but just white space between them. Speed's map of 1610 (surveyed by John Nordon about 1595) also shows Slawgha and Crawley with the Rape border passing between Schelley Forest on the west and Tylgate Forest on the east. Neither map shows any roads. It is likely that the Ridgeway from Horsham was used as it is the only dry east–west route, but this went south to Handcross then east along High Street (round the headwaters of Standford Brook) to Turners Hill and onwards to East Grinstead. A shorter but wetter (probably impassable in the winter) shortcut developed along Parish Lane crossing Standford Brook at Cinder Banks. This is clearly shown on Budgen's 1724 map which indicates a few buildings at Pease Pottage Gate with Buchan Hill to the west and a road north through Broadfield and Hogs Hill to Crawley. The road south to Handcross is not shown.

Cinder Banks takes its name from a double blast furnace known as Worth Furnace which was producing cannons in 1547 – a double furnace was required to produce enough iron for a cannon. Originally owned by Thomas Howard, 3rd Duke of Norfolk, it passed to Thomas Seymour, 1st Baron Seymour of Sudeley when Norfolk was accused of treason. Seymour suffered the same fate, and an inventory of his property taken in 1550 gives detailed information of the furnace which included 29 guns and six tons of shot. The furnace produced cast iron, some of which was taken north to the Blackwater finery forge (now under Maidenbower) to be converted into wrought iron. The furnace closed in the early 17th century due to a shortage of iron ore and wood. Thomas Seymore in his brief ownership suggested building a new town in the nearby park of Bewbush.

The main route between London and Brighton was further east (in 1756 the London-Brighton stage coach went via East Grinstead and Lewes). A toll road from Crawley north to London was built in the early 18th century, but the road south to Brighton through Pease Pottage was not constructed until 1770. The Ridgeway (today known as Horsham Road and Forest Road) was turnpiked in 1771 being the main Horsham-Crawley road prior to the McAdam Road being built in 1823 (now the old route of the A264 – it would have been extremely wet before it was given a hard surface). There were two London-Brighton coaches a day in each direction in 1797.

In the early 19th century Hon. Thomas Erskine (Lord Chancellor 1806–1807), son of the Earl of Buchan purchased Buchan Hill in the early 19th century and built a house in the fork between the two roads descending from the north end of Grouse Road towards Bewbush and Gossops Green. Although it is widely believed that Buchan Hill was named after his father, the name is on Budgen's map some 80 years earlier. The house is now the home of Cottesmore School. William Cobbett travelled the ridgeway on 31 July 1823., and wrote about it in his Rural Rides:

"...CRAWLEY...go two miles along the road...to Brighton; then you turn to the right [at Pease Pottage] and go over six of the worst miles in England...The first two of these miserable miles go through the estate of Lord ERSKINE. It was a bare heath here and there, in the better parts of it, some scrubby birch. It has been, in part, planted with fir-trees, which are as ugly as the heath was; and, in short, it is a most villainous track."

In Reminiscences of Horsham by Henry Burstow he states that on 4 October 1837 he went to Pease Pottage to see Queen Victoria pass through on her way from London to Brighton. There was "a large archway made of evergreens, with VICTORIA REGINA worked on it in various coloured dahlias".

Pease Pottage would have benefited from the toll roads, but lost the Crawley-Horsham traffic in 1823 with the opening of the new McAdam road through Faygate, and the London and Brighton Railway completed in 1841 which skirted along the eastern boundary of Pease Pottage cutting through Tilgate Forest alongside Standford Brook and through a tunnel under High Street. The Pease Pottage tollgate was removed in 1877. In 1896 on the day after the red flag law expired, 25 cars left London for Brighton, but half had broken down by Crawley. This event is still celebrated in the London to Brighton Veteran Car Run which still goes past Pease Pottage on the first Sunday in November.

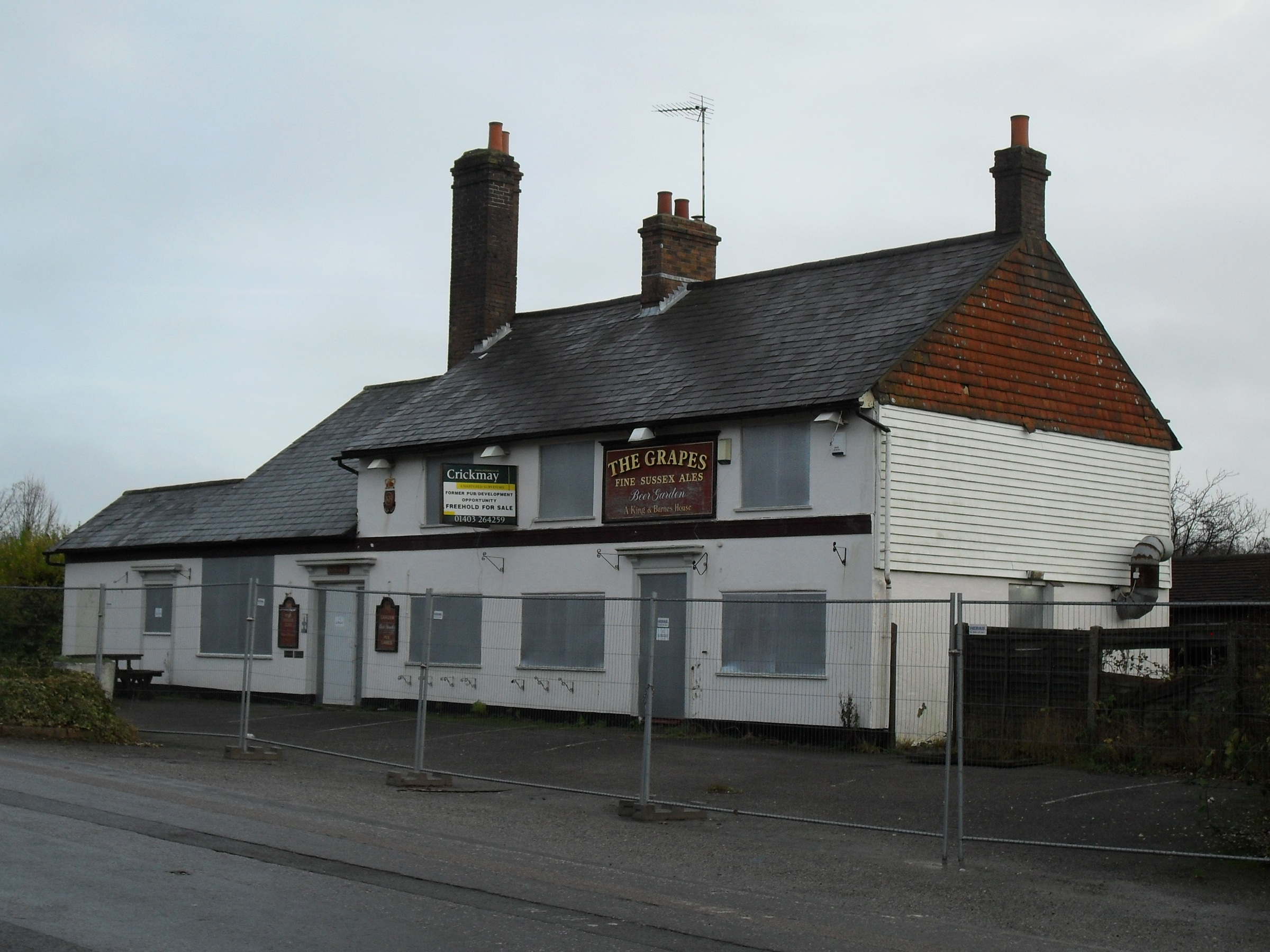
The Grapes Inn pictured in 2009, just before its demolition

The pub dates back to the 19th century. A pond in front of it was filled in 1883. A smithy was next door, and later a shop and a Jet petrol station opposite, with the Busy Bee restaurant behind. The Grapes pub (closed in 2008 and demolished in 2010) was further south, and had a tin church next to it. It was originally the toll house, and the name came from grapes grown in a greenhouse next door.

To the south of Pease Pottage is Tilgate Forest Row which had three shops, a blacksmith and post office. The Pease Pottage cricket field was between here and Pease Pottage (now a car breakers yard). The cricket field was made in 1874, but was ploughed up in 1939 as part of the war effort. It had a London horse-drawn tram as a pavilion. The ground was up to county ground standards.

The next major change to Pease Pottage was the opening of the M23 motorway in 1975 which continued as the A23 road, a two lane dual carriageway south to Handcross with the houses of Tilgate Forest Row facing onto it. The service station was opened in about 1990. The road layout was changed again in the mid-1990s with the A23 moved a few yards west and widened to three lanes. The old southbound carriageway became a new road to Handcross, and another new road was built on the other side of the A23 to Woodhurst. Tilgate Forest Row is now separated from Pease Pottage by ten traffic lanes.

A large number of houses have been built since 1946 when Pease Pottage consisted of a few buildings near the crossroads and a few isolated buildings on the A23. The first development was west along Horsham Road, mainly bungalows. This was followed by modern estates behind the Black Swan and to the west of the old A23 (now Brighton Road South). The last of these was on the site of Hemsleys nursery, south of which are Finches playing fields. Some apartments have been built on the old maintenance deport on the east side of Old Brighton Road North. The northern end of this cul-de-sac is in Crawley and there are now houses along the west side so the gap between Pease Pottage and Crawley has disappeared.

== Commercial activities ==
There are a number of commercial activities in the village, including the large car breakers yard on Brighton Road. Just south of this was the British Airports Authority Management Centre, the site next occupied by the Crawley Forest School opened on 18 September 2009 by Gloria Hunniford. The school was registered as an independent special school and a children's home with Ofsted. The registration was for a mixed provision (i.e. boys and girls) with an age range of 7–18 years and caters for 35 residential and 20-day pupils.

The site is now occupied by the controversial 'Cedars' UK Borders Agency Detention Centre, housing families temporarily before deportation. This was opened as a response to objections to children being held at the Yarl's Wood detention centre.

There are also large warehouses next to the old crossroads, and two small industrial parks – one between Brighton Road and the A23, and the other along Parish Lane. Finally there are some units at the golf driving range on the west of the village and the old Met Office site next door (which is strictly in Colgate).

== Country houses ==
There are two country houses just outside the borders of Pease Pottage, but which have it as a postal address, and are accessed from the village.

The original house at Buchan Hill was built in the early 19th century by Hon. Thomas Erskine (Lord Chancellor in 1806). His father was the Earl of Buchan from which it may have taken its name, although Buchan Hill is named on Richard Budgen's map of 1724, and its name may have attracted him. This house was built in a fork between two roads running north towards Bewbush and Gossops Green. Today the right of way descends along the west branch as far as the site of the old house, turns east across the front of it then north along the east branch. John Jervis Broadwood (a descendant of John Broadwood) occupied it in the 1860s.

The new Buchan House was built in 1883 by Philip Feril Renault Saillard who made his money from a new dye used for ostrich feathers. It was located NE of the original which was subsequently demolished, and had three drives – north, south and east. The latter linked it with the London-Brighton road, and runs along the border between Slaugham and Crawley. It cost £40000. It was designed by the London partnership of Ernest George and Harold Peto, and Sir Edwin Lutyens was also involved. The house was occupied by his daughter after his death in 1915 and subsequently was bought by Upland House School. It was occupied by the Pearl Assurance Company before the Second World War, then housed Canadian Army Officers (there was a Canadian Army Camp north of Horsham Road), since when it has been used by Cottesmore School.

Woodhurst was constructed as a country house in the early 19th century. It was just off the A23, but now is at the southern end of Old Brighton Road South, and is really in Handcross although it cannot be accessed from there. It was owned by Dame Margot Fonteyn and used as a ballet school. During World War 2 it was occupied by the Canadian army and was later used by the NHS as Woodhurst Hospital (there are several postcards of this taken in 1955), and later 55 older people with learning difficulties living in residential care provided by Surrey Oaklands NHS Trust. This closed in 2003, and the site is being developed as a Diagnostic and Treatment Centre and Care Home by Sussex Health Care.

== In popular culture ==
Pease Pottage featured in the 1953 film Genevieve as a very remote village deep in the Sussex countryside.

The fictional Doctor Who character Melanie Jane Bush lived at 36 Downview Crescent before joining the Sixth Doctor as a companion in the 23rd season. The village and its history feature prominently in the audio story The Wrong Doctors.

Pease Pottage was also featured in the 1911 novel The Four Men: A Farrago by Hilaire Belloc as the starting point of a side road.

== Notable people ==
- Albert Cordingley (1871-1939), first-class cricketer
- Edward Thornton (1893-1970), first-class cricketer and military officer
