= Slaugham =

Village and parish in West Sussex, England

Coordinates: 51.0387°N 0.20824°W

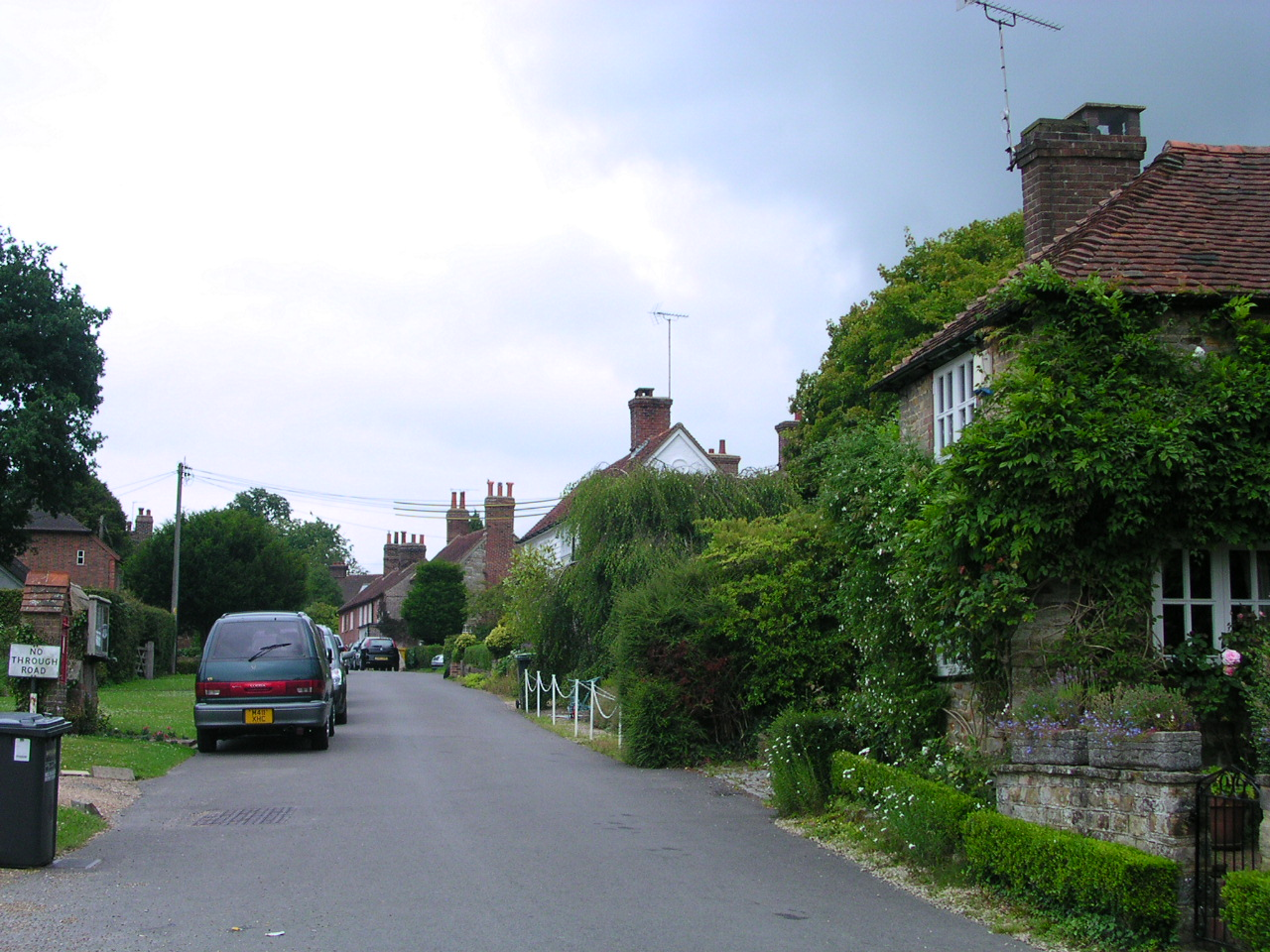

- Location within West Sussex
- Area: 24.32 km^{2} (9.39 sq mi)
- Population: 2,226 2001 Census; 2,769 (2011 Census)
  - Density: 92/km^{2} (240/sq mi)
- OS grid reference: TQ257281
  - London: 32 miles (51 km) N
- Civil parish: Slaugham
- District: Mid Sussex
- Shire county: West Sussex
- Region: South East
- Country: England
- Sovereign state: United Kingdom
- Post town: HAYWARDS HEATH
- Postcode district: RH17
- Post town: CRAWLEY
- Postcode district: RH11
- Dialling code: 01444; 01293
- Police: Sussex
- Fire: West Sussex
- Ambulance: South East Coast
- UK Parliament: Horsham
- Website: http://www.slaughampc.org.uk/

Slaugham (/ˈslæfəm/ or /ˈslɑːfəm/) is a village and civil parish in the Mid Sussex District of West Sussex, England. It is located 7 miles (11 km) to the south of Crawley, on the A23 road to Brighton. The civil parish covers an area of 2,432 hectares (6,010 acres). At the 2001 census it had a population of 2,226 persons of whom 1,174 were economically active. At the 2011 Census the parish included the villages of Handcross and Warninglid and had a population of 2,769. In addition the parish contains the settlement of Pease Pottage.

St Mary's Church is a Grade II* listed building dating mostly from the 12th and 13th centuries and is situated opposite Slaugham's village green. It serves all four villages. Church Covert wood off Staplefied Road is managed by the Woodland Trust.

== Twin towns – sister cities ==
Slaugham en Bocage is twinned with:

- Souleuvre en Bocage, France since 1974

== Bibliography ==
- Swinfen, Warden; Arscott, David (1984). Hidden Sussex. Brighton: BBC Radio Sussex. ISBN 0-9509510-0-5.
