= Ian Borland =

Scottish athlete (1907–1987)

Personal information
- Nationality: British (Scottish)
- Born: 1907 Glasgow, Scotland
- Died: 18 February 1987 (aged 79–80) Argyll, Scotland

Sport
- Sport: Athletics
- Event(s): Sprints, 440y
- Club: Glasgow University AC; Atalanta AC

Ian Howie Borland (1907 – 18 February 1987) was a track and field athlete from Scotland who competed at the 1930 British Empire Games (now Commonwealth Games).

== Biography ==
Borland was educated at Glasgow University and was a member of their athletics club

In 1929 he won the Scottish 440 yards title and the following year in 1930 he won all three of the shorter race distances (100, 220 and 440 yards) at their Glasgow University championships. Borland also represented the Atalanta Club, which was a club consisting of athletes from the Scottish Universities.

He represented the Scottish Empire Games team at the 1930 British Empire Games in Hamilton, Ontario, Canada, participating in two events, the 220 yards and the 440 yards.

At the time of the Games, he was living at 25 Sherbook Avenue in Glasgow and was an apprentice by profession.
