= Tiny Hermann =

Canadian athlete and player of Canadian football (1906–1966)

Profile
- Position: Placekicker

Personal information
- Born: August 25, 1906; Nictaux Falls, Nova Scotia, Canada
- Died: November 30, 1966 (aged 60); Metcalfe, Ontario, Canada
- Listed height: 6 ft 3 in (1.91 m)

Career history
- 1933–40: Ottawa Rough Riders

Awards and highlights
- Grey Cup champion (1940)

Medal record

Representing Canada

Athletics

British Empire Games
Silver medal – second place	1930 Hamilton	Discus
Bronze medal – third place	1930 Hamilton	Shot put

Charles Bismark "Tiny" Hermann (August 25, 1906 – November 30, 1966) was a Canadian sportsperson who competed in athletics and Canadian football. He is a member of the Nova Scotia Sports Hall of Fame.

== Biography ==
Born in Nictaux Falls, Nova Scotia, Hermann attended King's Collegiate School.

Hermann competed in the sport of athletics as a thrower in field events. At the 1930 British Empire Games in Hamilton, Ontario, he was a silver medalist in the discus and finished with bronze in the shot put. He won national titles in the hammer throw, shot put, and discus at the Canadian Championships in 1932.

Employed by the Royal Canadian Mounted Police, Hermann transferred to Ottawa for work and was signed by the Canadian football team the Ottawa Roughriders as a placekicker, debuting in 1933. He became a four-time All-Canadian, was the Big Four's leading scorer in 1937, and featured in the 1940 Grey Cup-winning side.

Hermann was killed in 1966 when a plane he was piloting crashed near Metcalfe, Ontario. He had been travelling to meet business associates in Cornwall and was under the assumption he would be able to land at a nearby airstrip, which it turned out was never completed. Plans were made to land at an alternate airstrip but the plane lost power in the engine due to the fuel supply failing and had to make a forced landing. The plane crashed into a field.
