= Leigh Miller (sprinter) =

Canadian sprinter (1905–1998)

Medal record

Men's Athletics

British Empire Games
Gold medal – first place	1930 Hamilton	4×110 yards

Leigh Miller (August 17, 1905, in Elmsdale, Nova Scotia – May 24, 1998, in Halifax, Nova Scotia) was a Canadian athlete who competed in the 1930 British Empire Games.

At the 1930 Empire Games he won the gold medal with the Canadian relay team in the 4×110 yards event. In the 100 yards competition he was eliminated in the heats.

== Competition record ==
Year	Competition	Venue	Position	Event	Notes
Representing Canada
1930	British Empire Games	Hamilton, Canada	4th (ht 3)	100 y	NT
