= Len Hutton (athlete) =

Canadian athlete (1908–1976)

Medal record

Men's athletics

Representing Canada

British Empire Games
Gold medal – first place	1930 Hamilton	Long jump
Bronze medal – third place	1930 Hamilton	Triple jump

Leonard Hutton (April 13, 1908 – September 29, 1976) was a Canadian athlete who competed in the 1932 Summer Olympics.

He was born in Montreal, Quebec. In 1932 he participated in the long jump event but was unable to set a mark. At the 1930 Empire Games he won the gold medal in the long jump competition and the bronze medal in the triple jump contest. He was a member of the Montreal AAA Winged Wheelers team that won the Grey Cup in 1931.
