= Warninglid =

Village in West Sussex, England

Coordinates: 51.02081°N 0.21921°W

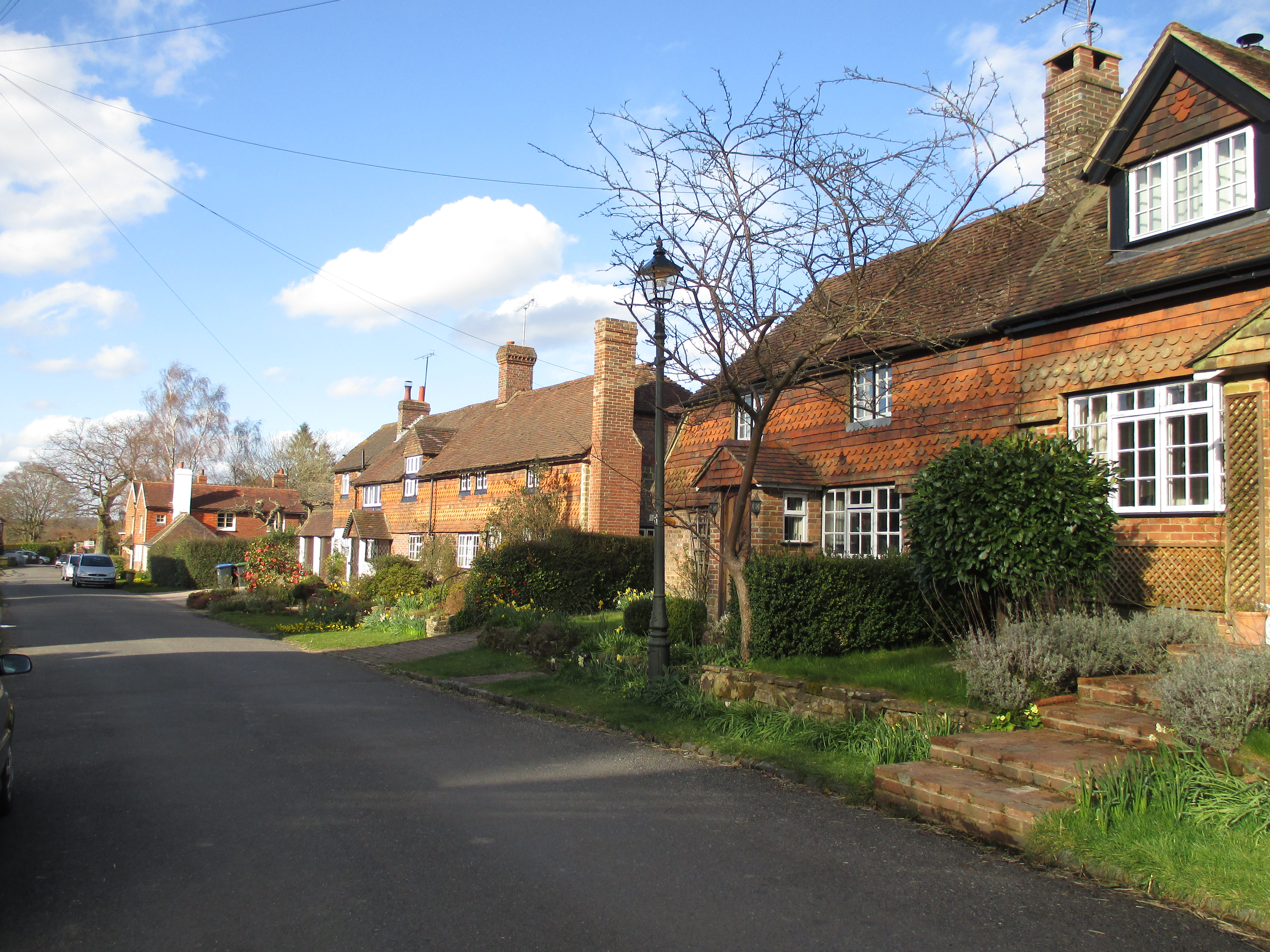
- The Street, Warninglid

- Location within West Sussex
- OS grid reference: TQ250261
- Civil parish: Slaugham
- District: Mid Sussex
- Shire county: West Sussex
- Region: South East
- Country: England
- Sovereign state: United Kingdom
- Post town: HAYWARDS HEATH
- Postcode district: RH17
- Dialling code: 01444
- Police: Sussex
- Fire: West Sussex
- Ambulance: South East Coast
- UK Parliament: Horsham

Warninglid (historically known as Warninglyth and Warningeld) is a small village in the Mid Sussex District of West Sussex, England. It lies on the B2115 road 5.5 miles (8.9 km) west of Haywards Heath. The name Warninglid is believed to originate from two words, Werna and Gelad (meaning "Werna's Path".) It is in the civil parish of Slaugham.

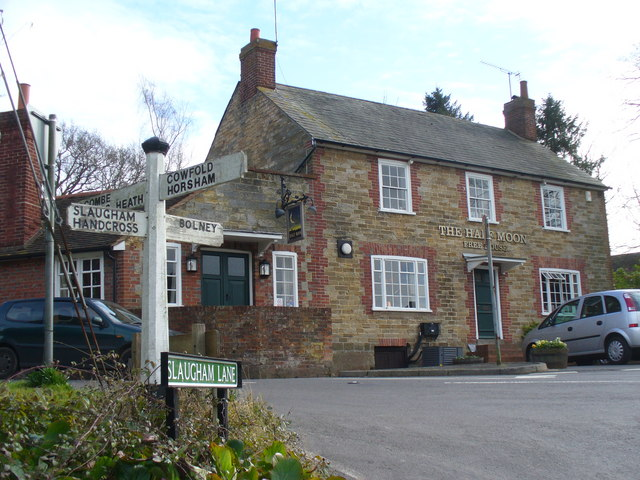
Half Moon pub.

At the centre of the village is a crossroads, and there sits the Half Moon public house. A nearby village - Handcross - provides the post office and convenience store for the locals. Over the last quarter century the village has won the Best-Kept Village competition three times.

There was one school serving Warninglid, namely Warninglid Primary School. The school taught 60 students and was led by Headteacher Marion West.. The school closed in 2021 and has been empty since. It was sold to a developer in 2024, but their identity has not been disclosed..
