= South Africa at the 1930 British Empire Games =

- CGF code: RSA

in Hamilton, Canada
- Medals Ranked 3rd: Gold 6 Silver 4 Bronze 7 Total 17

British Empire Games appearances
- 1930; 1934; 1938; 1950; 1954; 1958; 1962–1990; 1994; 1998; 2002; 2006; 2010; 2014; 2018; 2022; 2026; 2030

South Africa sent 12 athletes to participate at the 1930 British Empire Games in Hamilton, Ontario, Canada, from 16 August to 23 August 1930.
