= Gordon Smallacombe =

Canadian athletics competitor

Medal record

Men's athletics

Representing Canada

British Empire Games
Gold medal – first place	1930 Hamilton	Triple jump

Gordon Smallacombe (10 February 1907 – 1957) was a Canadian track and field athlete who competed in jumping events. A Torontonian based out of the West End YMCA, he was the gold medallist in the triple jump at the 1930 British Empire Games, becoming the inaugural champion in the event with a jump of 14.76 m (48 ft 5 in). It was in fact the very first gold medal won in the history of the British Empire (later Commonwealth) Games. He remains the only Canadian man to win that title. At the games, he also competed in the high jump (failing to record a mark) and in the long jump, taking fifth place with a jump of 6.61 m (21 ft 8 in).

He won three titles at the Canadian Track and Field Championships, being high jump champion in 1929 and double champion in 1930 in the long and triple jump.

== International competitions ==
Year	Competition	Venue	Position	Event	Notes
1930	British Empire Games	Hamilton, Canada	—	High jump	NM
1930	British Empire Games	Hamilton, Canada	5th	Long jump	6.61 m
1930	British Empire Games	Hamilton, Canada	1st	Triple jump	14.76 m GR
