= Werner Gerhardt =

South African sprinter

Medal record

Men's Athletics

Representing South Africa

British Empire Games
Bronze medal – third place	1930 Hamilton	4×110 yards
Bronze medal – third place	1930 Hamilton	4×440 yards

Werner Siegfried Friedeman Gerhardt (3 February 1907 – 1966) was a South African athlete who competed in the 1930 British Empire Games.

At the 1930 Empire Games he won the bronze medal with the South African relay in the 4×110 yards event as well as in the 4×440 yards competition. In the 100 yards contest he finished fifth and in the 220 yards event he finished sixth.

== Competition record ==
Year	Competition	Venue	Position	Event	Notes
Representing South Africa
1930	British Empire Games	Hamilton, Canada	5th	100 y	NT
