= Stanley Engelhart =

English sprinter (1910–1979)

Personal information
- Nationality: British (English)
- Born: 3 February 1910 Selby, England
- Died: 10 September 1979 (aged 69) Selby, England

Sport
- Sport: Athletics
- Event: Sprints
- Club: York Harriers & Athletic Club
Medal record
Men's Athletics
Representing England
British Empire Games
Gold medal – first place	1930 Hamilton	220 yd
Silver medal – second place	1930 Hamilton	4×110 yd

Stanley Eric Engelhart (3 February 1910 – 10 September 1979) was an English athlete who competed at the 1932 Summer Olympics.

== Biography ==
Engelhart was born Selby. He finished second behind John Hanlon in the 220 yards event at the 1929 AAA Championships.

Shortly before the 1930 British Empire Games, Engelhart became the national 220 yards champion after winning the British AAA Championships title and finished third behind Christiaan Berger in the 100 yards event at the 1930 AAA Championships. At the 1930 British Empire Games in Canada, he won the gold medal in the 220 yards contest. He won the silver medal with the English relay team in the 4×110 yards event.

Engelhart finished third behind Fred Reid in the 220 yards event at the 1932 AAA Championships.

Shortly afterwards Engelhart was selected to represent Great Britain at the 1932 Olympic Games in Los Angeles. He was eliminated in the quarter-finals of the 200 metres event after pulling a hamstring. He was also a member of the British relay team which finished sixth in the 4×100 metres competition, video footage shows him running with strapping on his hamstring after his injury in the 200m

== Competition record ==
Year	Competition	Venue	Position	Event	Notes
Representing England
1930	British Empire Games	Hamilton, Canada	6th	100 y	NT
