= Johannes Viljoen =

South African athlete

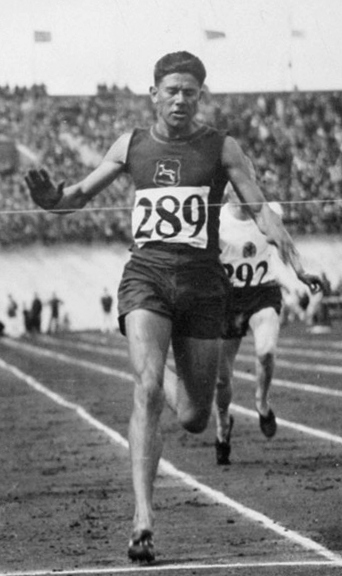
- Viljoen at the 1928 Olympics

Personal information
- Born: 11 January 1904 Hanover, Northern Cape, South Africa
- Died: 3 September 1976 (aged 72) Centurion, Gauteng, South Africa

Sport
- Sport: Athletics
- Event: Decathlon

Achievements and titles
- Personal best(s): 100 yd – 9.8 (1929); 110 mH – 14.6y (1933); LJ – 7.50 m (1929); HJ – 1.905 m (1930)
Medal record
Representing South Africa
British Empire Games
Gold medal – first place	1930 Hamilton	High jump
Bronze medal – third place	1930 Hamilton	Long jump

Johannes Hendrikus "Snaar" Viljoen (11 January 1904 – 3 September 1976) was a South African athlete. He competed at the 1928 Summer Olympics in the long jump, triple jump, 100 meters, 110 meter hurdles and decathlon, but failed to reach the finals.

At the 1930 Empire Games he won the gold medal in the high jump and the bronze medal in the long jump, finishing fourth in the 120 yards hurdles. He also participated in the 220 yards, in the 440 yards hurdles, and in the hammer throw contests. Four years later at the 1934 British Empire Games he reached the 120 yards hurdles final, but did not finish the race.

== Competition record ==
Year	Competition	Venue	Position	Event	Notes
Representing South Africa
1930	British Empire Games	Hamilton, Ontario	1st heat	220 y	NT
