= Howard Davies (hurdler) =

South African hurdler

Medal record

Men's Athletics

Representing South Africa

British Empire Games
Silver medal – second place	1930 Hamilton	120 yd hurdles
Bronze medal – third place	1930 Hamilton	4×110 yards

Howard Quail Davies (28 November 1906 – October 1993) was a South African athlete who competed in the 1930 British Empire Games.

At the 1930 Empire Games, he won the silver medal in the 120 yards hurdles event. He also participated in the 440 yards hurdles competition but was eliminated in the heats. With the South African relay team, he won the bronze medal in the 4×110 yards contest.

He was also an Educator, and has served as 9th Headmaster at Queen's College (Queenstown) from 1940 until 1964.
