= Colin Gordon (athlete) =

British-Guyanese high jumper (1907–1980)

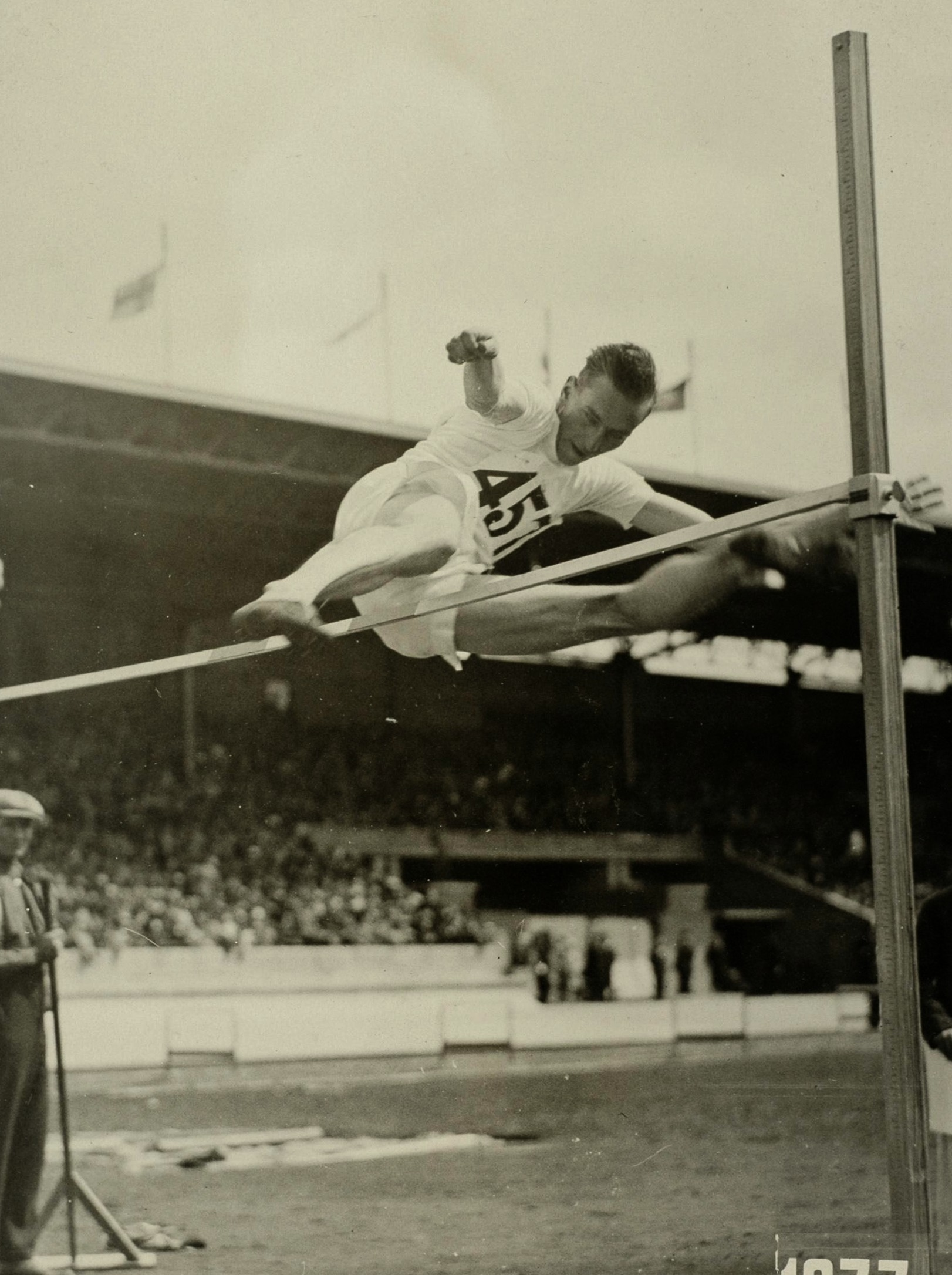
- Colin Gordon at the 1928 Olympics

Personal information
- Nationality: British
- Born: 24 December 1907 Bath Settlement, Mahaica-Berbice, British Guiana
- Died: 22 August 1960 (aged 52) Adelaide, Australia
- Height: 1.91 m (6 ft 3 in)

Sport
- Sport: High jump
- Club: University of Oxford AC; Achilles Club
Medal record
Representing British Guiana
British Empire Games
Silver medal – second place	1930 Hamilton	High jump

Colin Ernest Sutherland Gordon (24 December 1907 – 22 August 1960) was a high jumper from British Guiana (present-day Guyana, who competed for Great Britain at the 1928 Summer Olympics.

== Biography ==
Gordon competed for Great Britain at the 1928 Olympic Games and finished in 17th place.

Shortly before the 1930 British Empire Games in Canada, Gordon became the national high jump champion after winning the British AAA Championships title at the 1930 AAA Championships.

At the 1930 British Empire Games he represented British Guiana and won the silver medal. Gordon was the son of John Richard Colin Gordon, a sugar-planter, and his wife Hilda Sloman.

Gordon worked as a teacher at Trinity College School, Port Hope, Ontario, Canada for a year and in 1931 moved to Geelong Grammar School in Australia. During World War II he served as a Wing Commander with the Royal Australian Air Force. After demobilisation he became Headmaster of St. Peter's College in Adelaide, Australia, where he worked until his death in 1960.
