= Athletics at the 1930 British Empire Games =

Athletics at the 1st British Empire and Commonwealth Games
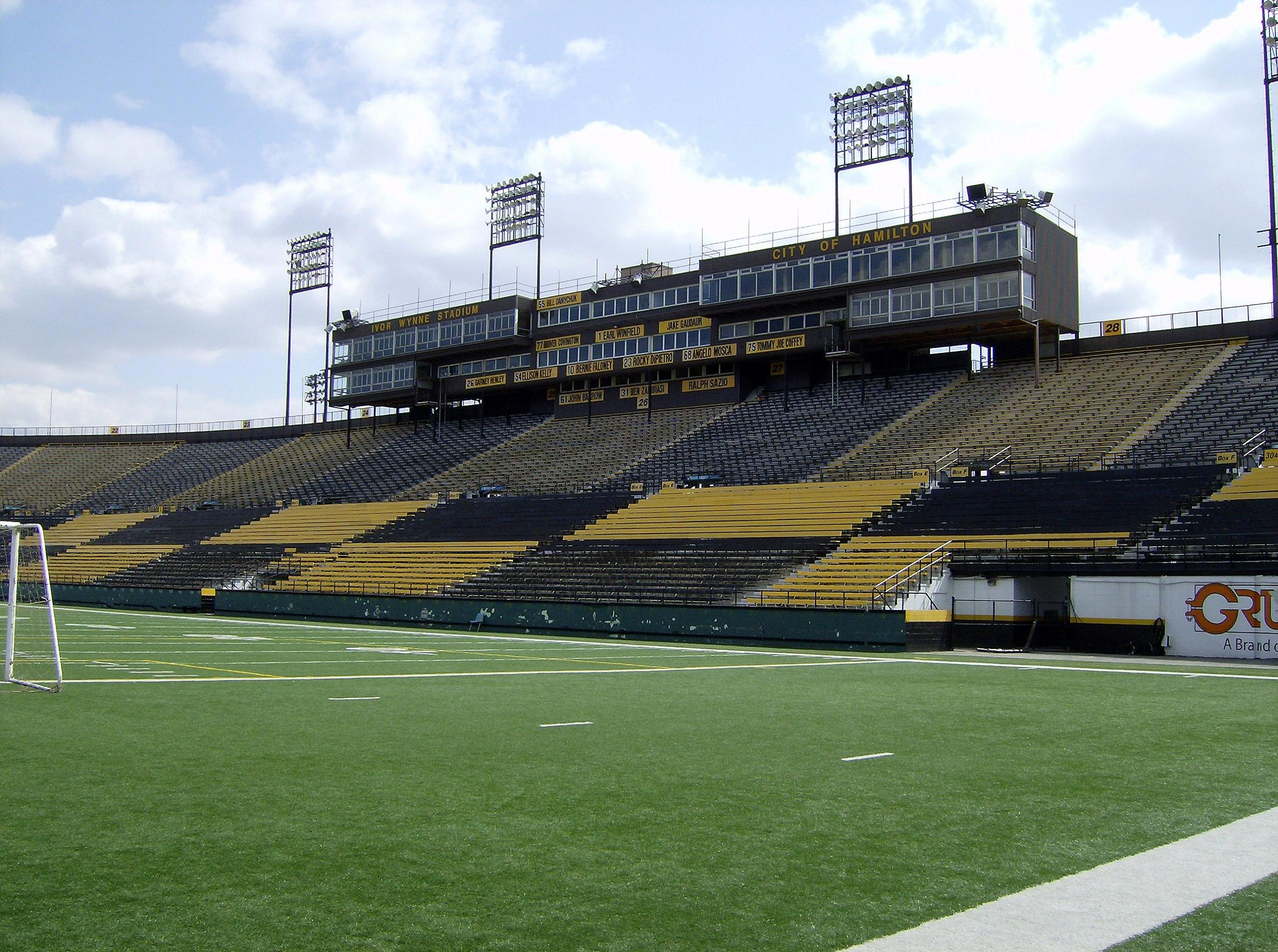
- The now-modernised Civic Stadium in Hamilton
- Dates: 16–23 August 1930
- Host city: Hamilton, Canada
- Venue: Civic Stadium
- Level: Senior
- Events: 21
- Participation: 134 athletes from 10 nations

At the 1930 British Empire Games, the athletics events were held at the Civic Stadium in Hamilton, Ontario, Canada. The programme featured 21 men's events, with all measurements being done in imperial units.

England came away with the most medals in the athletics competition, winning nine gold medals and twenty-five medals overall. The hosts, Canada, were the next most successful and won 19 medals all together, six of which were gold. South Africa were the other nation to take away a large athletics medal haul, having three golds and ten medals in total. Eight nations featured on the medal tally at the first British Empire Games.

South African Harry Hart was highly successful in the throwing events and he came away from the games as the champion in the shot put and discus throw, as well as being the javelin throw bronze medallist. David Burghley took a hurdles double for England, winning both the 110-yard and 440-yard races. Reg Thomas won the mile run and was the 880 yards silver medallist. John Fitzpatrick of Canada won a medal of each colour in the sprinting events, winning his gold with the Canadian 4 × 100 metres relay team. Englishman Reg Revans won silver medals in the horizontal jumps, while Canadian Len Hutton won long jump gold, but only a bronze in the triple jump. Johannes Viljoen of South Africa showed his versatility by winning the high jump and reaching the podium in the long jump as well.

There were no events for women at this edition of the games.

== Medal summary ==
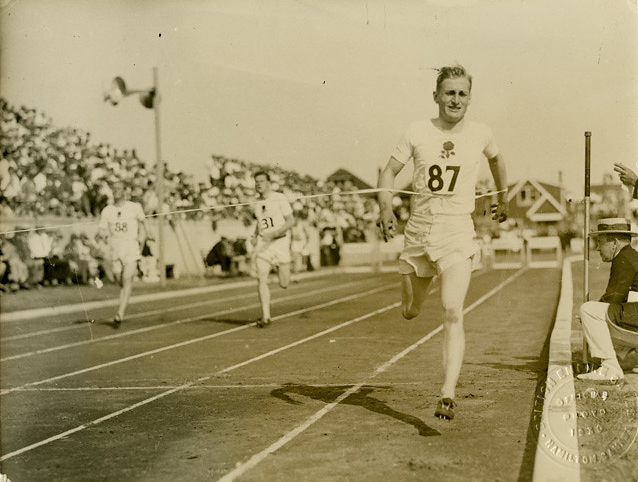
Lord Burghley wins the 440 yards hurdles

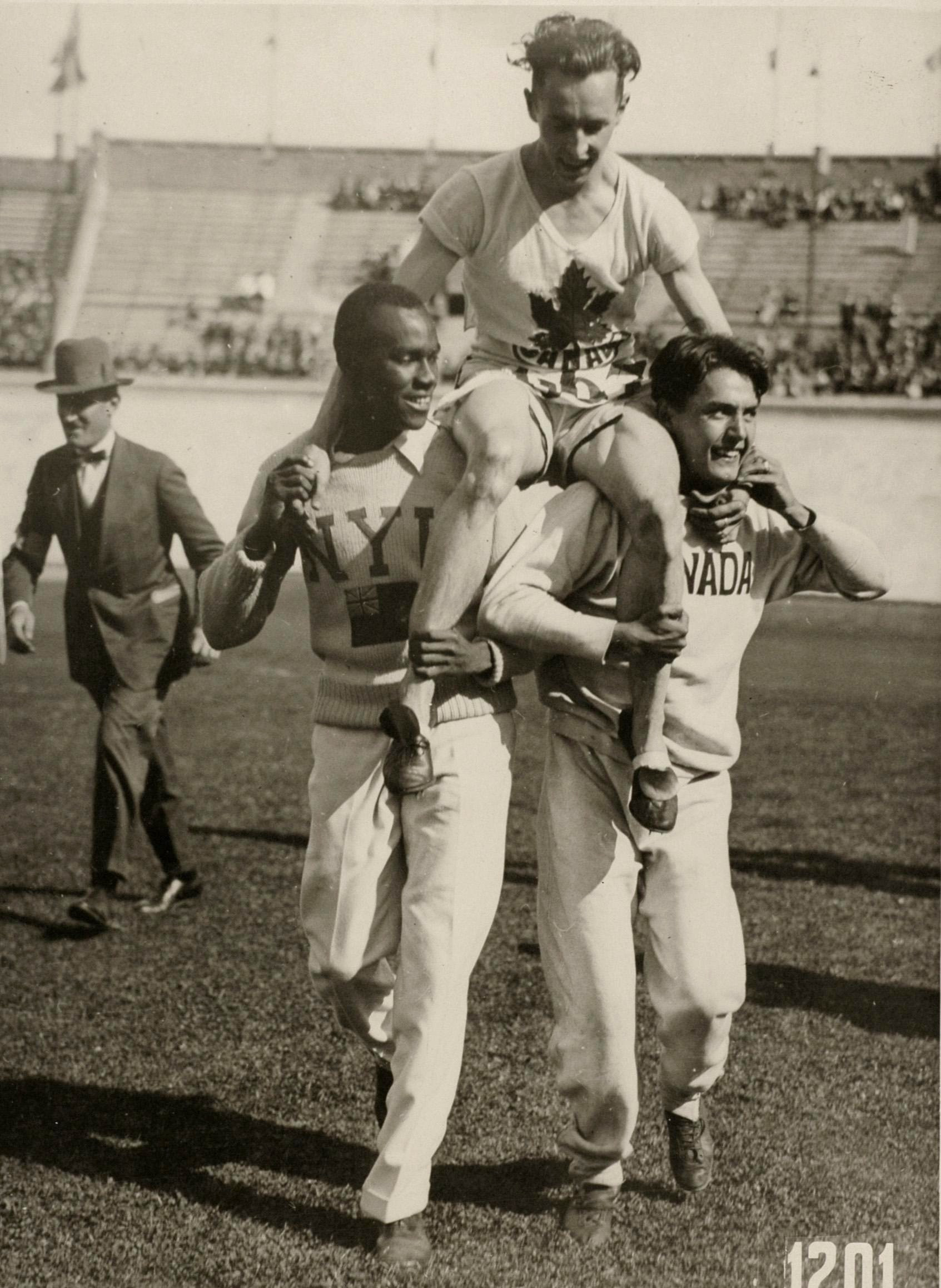
Percy Williams, men's 100 yards champion

Medallists in men's athletics by event, including times, heights and distances
Event	Gold		Silver		Bronze	
100 yards	Percy Williams; Canada	9.9	Ernie Page; England	10.2e	John Fitzpatrick; Canada	10.2e
220 yards	Stanley Engelhart; England	21.8	John Fitzpatrick; Canada		Willie Walters; South Africa	
440 yards	Alex Wilson; Canada	48.8	Willie Walters; South Africa	48.9e	George Golding; Australia	
880 yards	Tommy Hampson; England	1:52.4	Reg Thomas; England	1:55.5e	Alex Wilson; Canada	1:55.6e
1 mile	Reg Thomas; England	4:14.0	William Whyte; Australia	4:17.0e	Jerry Cornes; England	
3 miles	Stan Tomlin; England	14:27.4	Alex Hillhouse; Australia	14:27.6e	Jack Winfield; England	14:29.0e
6 miles	Billy Savidan; New Zealand	30:49.6	Ernie Harper; England	31:01.6e	Tom Evenson; England	
Marathon	Dunky Wright; Scotland	2:43:43	Sam Ferris; England	2:47:13e	Johnny Miles; Canada	2:48:23e
120 yards hurdles	David Burghley; England	14.6	Howard Davies; South Africa	14.7e	Fred Gaby; England	
440 yards hurdles	David Burghley; England	54.4	Roger Leigh-Wood; England	55.9e	Douglas Neame; England	
2 miles steeplechase	George Bailey; England	9:52.0	Alex Hillhouse; Australia	+75 yds (10:04.8 e)	Vernon Morgan; England	
4 × 110 yards relay	Canada; Leigh Miller; Jim Brown; Ralph Adams; John Fitzpatrick	42.2	England; John Heap; James Cohen; John Hanlon; Stanley Engelhart	42.7e	South Africa; Werner Gerhardt; Howard Davies; Wilfred Legg; Willie Walters	
4 × 440 yards relay	England; Roger Leigh-Wood; Stuart Townend; David Burghley; Kenneth Brangwin	3:19.4	Canada; Art Scott; Stanley Glover; Jimmy Ball; Alex Wilson	3:19.8e	South Africa; John Chandler; Wilfred Legg; Werner Gerhardt; Willie Walters	
High jump	Johannes Viljoen; South Africa	6' 3" (1.905 m)	Colin Gordon; British Guiana	6' 2" (1.88 m)	William Stargratt; Canada	6' 1" (1.855 m)
Pole vault	Victor Pickard; Canada	12' 3" (3.73 m)	Howard Ford; England	12' 3" (3.73 m)	Robert Stoddard; Canada	12' 0" (3.655 m)
Long jump	Len Hutton; Canada	23' 7 1/2" (7.20 m)	Reg Revans; England	22' 6" (6.86 m)	Johannes Viljoen; South Africa	22' 6" (6.86 m)
Triple jump	Gordon Smallacombe; Canada	48' 5" (14.755 m)	Reg Revans; England	46' 10 3/4" (14.29 m)	Len Hutton; Canada	45' 7 1/4" (13.90 m)
Shot put	Harry Hart; South Africa	47' 10" (14.58 m)	Robert Howland; England	44' 2" (13.46 m)	Charles Hermann; Canada	42' 7" (12.98 m)
Discus throw	Harry Hart; South Africa	135' 11" (41.425 m)	Charles Hermann; Canada	135' 3" (41.22 m)	Abe Zvonkin; Canada	135' 1" (41.17 m)
Hammer Throw	Malcolm Nokes; England	154' 7" (47.12 m)	Bill Britton; Ireland	153' 10" (46.89 m)	John Cameron; Canada	145' 10" (44.45 m)
Javelin throw	Stan Lay; New Zealand	207' 1 1/2" (63.13 m)	Doral Pilling; Canada	183' 6" (55.93 m)	Harry Hart; South Africa	174' 7" (53.21 m)

== Medal table ==
* Host nation (Canada)

Medals won by nation with totals, ranked by number of golds—sortable
Rank	Nation	Gold	Silver	Bronze	Total
1	England (ENG)	9	10	6	25
2	Canada (CAN)*	6	4	9	19
3	South Africa (SAF)	3	2	5	10
4	New Zealand (NZL)	2	0	0	2
5	Scotland (SCO)	1	0	0	1
6	Australia (AUS)	0	3	1	4
7	British Guiana (BGU)	0	1	0	1
7	(Leinster) Ireland	0	1	0	1
Totals (8 entries)		21	21	21	63

== Participating nations ==
- Australia (5)
- Bermuda (1)
- British Guiana (2)
- Canada (53)
- England (45)
- Ireland (5)
- New Zealand (4)
- Newfoundland (4)
- Scotland (8)
- South Africa (7)
