= Francis Foley (athlete) =

English athletics competitor

Personal information
- Nationality: British (English)
- Born: 26 September 1904 Upton on Severn, Worcestershire, England
- Died: January 1991 (aged 86) South Croydon, England

Sport
- Sport: Athletics
- Events: Long jump, pole vault shot put, 120y hurdles
- Club: Surrey AC

Francis Albert Foley (26 September 1904 – January 1991) was an athlete from England who competed at the British Empire Games (now Commonwealth Games). His name is incorrectly recorded as Fred or Frederick on various websites, although this may have been a nickname that he went by.

== Biography ==
In 1928 Foley won the Army heavyweight boxing championship.

In 1929, Foley a sergeant with the 1st Scots Guards won the Army's 1929 shot put championship He represented England against France and finished second behind David Burghley in the 120 yards hurdles event at the 1929 AAA Championships.

In 1930 Foley impressed when winning over 120 yards hurdles at the annual ROAC meet.

Shortly before the 1930 British Empire Games in Canada, Foley finished third behind Lord Burghley in the 120 yards hurdles event at the 1930 AAA Championships.

A member of the Surrey Athletics Club, he competed in the long jump, pole vault, shot put and 120 yards hurdles at the 1930 British Empire Games for England.

On the official 2 September 1930 passenger list of the 'Duchess of York', that lists all of the athletes arriving in Liverpool from the Montreal port, he is listed as a 27 year old sergeant major in the Scots Guards, living at the battalion's residence in Windsor.

In 1932 Foley, still a member of 1st Battalion Scots Guards, married Gwen King.

Foley was Scots Guards and Queens bodyguard for 27 years, awarded MBE, MSM and RVM.
