= John Hanlon (athlete) =

English sprinter

Personal information
- Nationality: British (English)
- Born: 18 December 1905 Portsmouth, England
- Died: 17 October 1983 (aged 60) Morpeth, England
- Height: 187 cm (6 ft 2 in)
- Weight: 74 kg (163 lb)

Sport
- Sport: Athletics
- Event: 220m/400m
- Club: Birchfield Harriers
Medal record
Men's Athletics
Representing England
British Empire Games
Silver medal – second place	1930 Hamilton	4×110 yards

John Austin Thomas Hanlon (18 December 1905 – 17 October 1983) was an English athlete who competed for Great Britain in the 1928 Summer Olympics.

== Biography ==
Hanlon was born in Portsmouth. In 1928 he was eliminated in the first round of the Olympic 400 metre event.

Hanlon became the national 220 yards champion and the national 440 yards champion after winning the British AAA Championships titles at the 1929 AAA Championships.

Shortly before the 1930 British Empire Games in Canada, Hanlon finished second behind Kenneth Brangwin in the 440 yards event and third behind Stanley Engelhart in the 220 yards at the 1930 AAA Championships. At the 1930 British Empire Games, he won the silver medal with the English relay team in the 4×110 yards competition. In the 220 yards contest and in the 440 yards event he was eliminated in the heats.

Hanlon finished second behind Robin Murdoch in the 220 yards event at the 1931 AAA Championships.

He died in Morpeth, Northumberland.
