= Kenneth Brangwin =

English sprinter (1907–1983)

Personal information
- Nationality: British (English)
- Born: 11 June 1907 Edmonton, London, England
- Died: 25 May 1983 (aged 75) Birmingham, England

Sport
- Sport: Athletics
- Event: 440 yards
- Club: South London Harriers
Medal record
Men's Athletics
Representing England
British Empire Games
Gold medal – first place	1930 Hamilton	4×440 yd relay

Kenneth Colin Brangwin (11 June 1907 – 25 May 1983) was an English sprinter who competed in the 1930 British Empire Games.

== Career ==
Shortly before the 1930 British Empire Games in Canada, Brangwin became the national 440 yards champion after winning the British AAA Championships title at the 1930 AAA Championships.

At 1930 Empire Games he won the gold medal with the English team of Roger Leigh-Wood, Stuart Townend and David Burghley, recording 3:19.4 in the 4 × 440 yards relay final. He also competed in the 440 yards competition where he finished fourth.
