= 1932 United States Olympic trials (track and field) =

1932 United States Olympic trials (track & field)
- Dates: July 15–July 16
- Host city: Stanford, California (men); Evanston, Illinois (women)
- Venue: Stanford Stadium (men); Dyche Stadium (women)
- Level: Senior
- Type: Outdoor

The 1932 United States Olympic trials for track and field were held on July 15 and July 16, 1932 and decided the United States team for the 1932 Summer Olympics in Los Angeles. The trials for men and women were held separately; men competed in Stanford Stadium in Stanford, California, while women competed in Dyche Stadium in Evanston, Illinois. Both meetings also served as the annual United States outdoor track and field championships. For the first time, only the top three athletes in each event qualified for the Olympics; until 1928, every nation had been allowed four entrants per event.

Official world records were set in the men's meet by Jack Keller of Ohio State University in the 110 m hurdles and by Bill Graber of the University of Southern California in the pole vault. The women's meet was dominated by Babe Didrikson of Employers Casualty, who won three of the five Olympic qualifying events and three additional national championship events; Employers Casualty won the women's national team title despite not entering any other athletes.

== Organization ==
The American Olympic Committee (AOC) was responsible for the Olympic selections, while the Amateur Athletic Union (AAU) controlled the national championships. This resulted in a controversy when AOC officials made a late change to the rules for field event qualifying (advancing eight athletes instead of five to the final rounds) without the approval of the AAU. Two athletes (Dick Barber in the long jump and Kenneth Churchill in the javelin throw) won their events after qualifying for the last rounds outside the top five; they were selected for the Olympics, but the AAU did not recognize them as national champions. For the next sixty years the men's Olympic trials and national championships were held separately; they only became a single meet again in 1992.

=== Qualifying ===
As in previous years, athletes qualified for the men's Olympic trials by competing in preliminary and semi-final tryouts; the two major collegiate championship meets (the NCAA championship and the IC4A championship) both had semi-final status. Although the number of preliminary meetings had increased, fewer athletes qualified for the final trials. For the first time, only the top three finishers at the final trials qualified for the Olympic team; up to 1928, each nation had been allowed four entrants per event. For the 4 × 100 meters relay and 4 × 400 meters relay, lower-placed athletes who had not qualified individually were selected; the top finishers from the 100 meters and 400 meters were only named to the relay pools as alternates to substitute in case of injury.

Some events held as part of the national championships did not have Olympic qualifying status (due to those events not being contested at the Olympics), while some Olympic qualifying events were held separately from the trials proper and did not in all cases have national championship status. The marathon team was selected on the basis of three races (the top American finisher from each race qualified), while the 50 km race walk team was selected on the basis of two races. The decathlon team was selected on the basis of one competition, held in Evanston three weeks before the main trials; although held separately, it did double as a national championship.

== Men ==
The men's Olympic trials were held at Stanford Stadium on July 15 and July 16. In track events, hand timing was used as the primary timing method, while Gustavus Kirby's automatic timing device was used secondarily. Official world records were set by Jack Keller in the 110 m hurdles and by Bill Graber in the pole vault. In addition, Joe McCluskey set an unratified world best in the 3000 m steeplechase, and (as nearly all top competitions until then had been only hand-timed) several athletes set world automatic-time bests.

=== Track ===
| Event | First | | Second | | Third | |
|---|---|---|---|---|---|---|
| 100 meters | Ralph Metcalfe | 10.6 | Eddie Tolan | 10.7e | George Simpson | 10.8e |
| 200 meters straight | Ralph Metcalfe | 21.5 | Eddie Tolan | 21.7e | George Simpson | 21.7e |
| 400 meters | Bill Carr | 46.9 | Ben Eastman | 47.1e | James Gordon | 47.4e |
| 800 meters | Edwin Genung | 1:52.6 | Chuck Hornbostel | 1:52.8e | Edwin Turner | 1:52.9e |
| 1500 meters | Norwood Hallowell | 3:52.7 | Frank Crowley | 3:53.3e | Glenn Cunningham | 3:53.8e |
| 5000 meters | Ralph Hill | 14:55.7 | Paul Rekers | 130 yds bh | Daniel Dean | 20 yds bh2 |
| 10,000 meters | Tom Ottey | 32:18.2 | Eino Pentti | 40 yds bh | Lou Gregory | 20 yds bh2 |
| 3000 meter steeplechase | Joe McCluskey | 9:14.5 WB | Walter Pritchard | 20 yds bh | Glen Dawson | 2 yds bh2 |
| 110 meter hurdles | Jack Keller | 14.4 =WR | George Saling | 14.6e | Percy Beard | 14.6e |
| 400 meter hurdles | Joe Healey | 53.9e | Morgan Taylor | 2 yds bh | Glenn Hardin | 53.5 (DQ) |

Metcalfe, Tolan and Simpson qualified for the Olympics in both of the short sprints. Emmett Toppino and Frank Wykoff placed fourth and fifth in the 100 meters, while Bob Kiesel and Hec Dyer took fourth and fifth in the 200 meters; those four were named to the 4 × 100 meters relay. James Johnson, who placed sixth in both events, was suggested for the relay pool by team coach Lawson Robertson but not selected by the AOC. Tolan went on to win a sprint double at the Olympics.

In the 400 meters, the United States had by far the best depth of any country. Ben Eastman, a Stanford runner, had set world records at both 440 yards and 880 yards earlier in 1932, and would have been a leading favorite at both the trials and the Olympics in either the 400 m or the 800 m. He did not compete in the 800 m, and lost to the fast-finishing Carr in the one-lap race; Carr had already beaten him at the 1932 IC4A championships, and would do so again at the Olympics. The athletes who placed fourth to seventh (Ed Ablowich, Ivan Fuqua, Arnold Adams and Karl Warner) were named to the 4 × 400 m relay team; Adams later injured his foot and withdrew from the team, and Carr was used as a substitute.

Eddie Genung won his third consecutive national title in the 800 meters, defeating NCAA champion Hornbostel; the Americans went on to place fourth, fifth and sixth at the Olympics, but the absence of Eastman cost the United States an excellent medal chance. The 1500 meters saw an upset, as the leading favorite, Gene Venzke, only placed fourth and failed to qualify; Venzke had set a world record during the indoor season and an American record outdoors, but had lost his best shape after an injury in training. NCAA champion Cunningham, who had also broken the previous American record in 1932, was an upcoming talent; at the Olympics he was the best American in fourth place, but his best years were still ahead of him.

In the 5000 and 10,000 meters the American teams were relatively weak with the exception of Ralph Hill, who won his race easily; in Los Angeles he took a close silver in a controversial race, as Finland's world record holder Lauri Lehtinen obstructed Hill's attempts to pass him in the final straight.

McCluskey's time in the 3000-meter steeplechase was an unofficial world best; the IAAF did not start ratifying official world records in the steeplechase until 1954. At the Olympics, McCluskey won bronze in an extra-long race after a mistake by the lap counter resulted in the athletes running one additional lap. In the 110 m hurdles, the United States fielded an extremely strong team; Keller, Saling and Beard all set both official and unratified world records during their careers, as did the man in fourth, Johnny Morriss. Keller's winning time, 14,4, equaled the world record; his Kirby time was 14.53, also a world best. The wind reading was -0.2 m/s; Keller's world record was the first to have an official wind reading.

Glenn "Slats" Hardin crossed the finish line in first place in the 400 m hurdles, but was disqualified for running in the wrong lane. As only two other athletes finished the race (the fourth man in the final, Eugene Beatty, fell and failed to finish), the disqualification did not cost Hardin his place on the team. Morgan Taylor had won Olympic gold in 1924 and bronze in 1928; he won his third consecutive medal in Los Angeles, placing third behind Ireland's Bob Tisdall and Hardin.

=== Field ===
| Event | First | | Second | | Third | |
|---|---|---|---|---|---|---|
| High jump | Cornelius Johnson; George Spitz; Bob Van Osdel | 6 ft 6 5/8 in (1.99 m) | | | | |
| Pole vault | Bill Graber | 14 ft 4 3/8 in (4.37 m) WR | Bill Miller | 14 ft 1 5/8 in (4.30 m) | George Jefferson | 13 ft 10 1/4 in (4.22 m) |
| Long jump | Dick Barber | 25 ft 4 3/8 in (7.73 m) | Ed Gordon | 25 ft 3 3/8 in (7.70 m) | Lambert Redd | 25 ft 2 1/8 in (7.67 m) |
| Triple jump | Sidney Bowman | 48 ft 11 1/4 in (14.91 m) | Rolland Romero | 48 ft 10 1/4 in (14.89 m) | Levi Casey | 48 ft 4 3/4 in (14.75 m) |
| Shot put | Leo Sexton | 52 ft 8 in (16.05 m) | Nelson Gray | 50 ft 11 7/8 in (15.54 m) | Harlow Rothert | 50 ft 11 1/2 in (15.53 m) |
| Discus throw | John Anderson | 165 ft 6 3/8 in (50.45 m) | Paul Jessup | 158 ft 4 in (48.26 m) | Henri LaBorde | 158 ft 1/8 in (48.16 m) |
| Hammer throw | Frank Conner | 170 ft 10 3/4 in (52.09 m) | Pete Zaremba | 168 ft 11 3/4 in (51.51 m) | Grant McDougall | 168 ft 2 1/4 in (51.26 m) |
| Javelin throw | Kenneth Churchill | 222 ft 3 5/8 in (67.76 m) | Malcolm Metcalf | 219 ft 7 5/8 in (66.94 m) | Lee Bartlett | 214 ft 2 3/4 in (65.30 m) |

Johnson, Spitz and Van Osdel shared first place (and the national championship) in the high jump. Spitz had set a world record indoors and was generally considered the favorite, but he suffered from on-and-off injuries through the summer of 1932; at the Olympics, his ankle bothered him and he only placed ninth as Van Osdel took silver.

The pole vault competition had the highest quality of any in the world yet; Graber broke both the amateur world record of Lee Barnes and the unofficial professional record of Charles Hoff, while Miller equaled the Barnes record. Four vaulters (Jefferson, Don Zimmerman, Fred Sturdy and Bud Deacon) cleared 13 ft 10 1/4 in; the third and final Olympic spot was decided by a jump-off, in which Jefferson prevailed. The United States dominated pole vault at the time; that the Americans only won gold (Miller) and bronze (Jefferson) at the Olympics was seen as a disappointment.

In the long jump (then still usually called the broad jump), IC4A champion Dick Barber was only seventh after the qualifying rounds and benefited from the late rule change by AOC that allowed athletes in places six to eight to qualify for the final. His winning jump was originally flagged as a foul, but he successfully protested that ruling. Since he would not have qualified for the last three rounds under the AAU's rules, runner-up Ed Gordon won the AAU national championship; Gordon went on to win gold at the Olympics, ahead of NCAA champion Redd.

The triple jump (contemporarily hop, step and jump) resulted in a minor controversy surrounding the third Olympic spot behind Bowman and Romero; 1928 Olympic silver medalist Levi Casey placed third at the trials, but the AOC instead selected Sol Furth, who placed fourth. Why this substitution happened was left unexplained by AOC officials, though they said the reasons were known to Casey; Casey, for his part, stated he did not know why he had been left out of the team.

Both Leo Sexton and Herman Brix, who placed fifth, had exceeded the shot put world record earlier in 1932 with throws of 52 ft 8 5/8 in (16.07 m); those records were never ratified, and Sexton's trials mark equaled the official world record, though it too went unratified. Sexton went on to win Olympic gold in Los Angeles and set an official world record after the Olympics, becoming the first man to reach 53 feet.

Returning Olympian John Anderson was an expected champion in the discus; although Jessup held the world record, he had not been as good as Anderson in 1932. Anderson and LaBorde took gold and silver at the Olympics. Hammer throw champion Frank Conner was also a returning Olympian; at the Olympics he failed to record a valid mark, while trials runner-up Zaremba placed third. Like long jump champion Barber, Kenneth Churchill in the javelin benefited from the AOC's rule change; he was only sixth after the qualifying rounds but came close to breaking James DeMers's American record in the final. The runner-up, Malcolm Metcalf, was recognized as AAU champion.

=== Other qualifying events ===
| Event | Location | First | | Second | | Third | |
|---|---|---|---|---|---|---|---|
| Decathlon | Evanston, Illinois; June 24–25 | James Bausch | 8103 | Wilson Charles | 7378 | Clyde Coffman | 7360 |
| Marathon | Boston, Massachusetts; April 19 | Paul de Bruyn (Germany) | 2:33:36.4 | James Henigan | 2:34:32 | Ville Kyrönen (Finland) | 2:34:55 |
| | Cambridge-Salisbury, Massachusetts; May 28 | Hans Oldag | 2:38:00 | Albert Michelsen | 2:43:45 | Hugo Kauppinen (Finland) | 2:48:00 |
| | Los Angeles, California; June 25 | Albert Michelsen | 2:44:11 | Franklin Suhu | 3:05:14 | Andy Myyra | 3:20e |
| 50 km walk | New York City; June 5 | Ernest Crosbie | 5:30:46 | Bill Chisholm | 5:31:17 | Rudolph Hantke | 5:39:03 |
| | Los Angeles, California; July 3 | Harry Hinkel | 5:12:57 | Michael Pecora | 8 mins bh | Eugene Newton | |

The decathlon tryouts, which doubled as AAU championships, were held in Dyche Stadium in Evanston, Illinois three weeks before the main trials. Jim Bausch, who went on to win Olympic gold with a new world record, was in third place after five events but ran away with the competition on the second day; he excelled particularly in the throws and the pole vault.

Marathon selections were based on three races, including the Boston Marathon; the top American from each of the races (Henigan, Oldag and Michelsen) qualified for the Olympic team. Oldag was a German-born newcomer, and AOC officials had to verify that he had been naturalized and was eligible to represent the United States. Henigan and Michelsen were both returning Olympians. In the 50 km walk, selections were based on two races; the top two from New York (Crosbie and Chisholm) and the winner of Los Angeles (Hinkel) were named to the team, with Los Angeles runner-up Pecora as alternate.

=== Other AAU championship events ===
| Event | First | | Second | | Third | |
|---|---|---|---|---|---|---|
| 220 yd low hurdles | George Saling | 23.6 | Lee Sentman | 4 ft bh | Jimmy Payne | 3 in bh2 |
| 56 pound weight throw | Leo Sexton | 35 ft 2 in (10.72 m) | Frank Conner | 34 ft 4 in (10.46 m) | Pat McDonald | 33 ft 9 1/4 in (10.29 m) |

These non-Olympic events were contested in Stanford Stadium as part of the AAU national championships. McDonald, who placed third in the weight throw, was almost 54 years old; he had won the event at the 1920 Olympics when it was still part of the Olympic program, and was a multiple national champion. He won one more AAU title in 1933, becoming the oldest ever AAU champion.

== Women ==
The women's Olympic trials were held in Dyche Stadium on July 16. The star of the meet was Mildred "Babe" Didrikson, who won three of the five Olympic qualifying events and three of the five additional individual AAU events; she took part in all of the trials events, the only athlete ever to do so. She represented Employers Casualty of Dallas, Texas, who won the women's team championship despite not entering any other athletes; Employers Casualty scored 30 points, while the Illinois Women's Athletic Club placed second with 22 points.

Although some of Didrikson's marks were cited as "world records" in both contemporary and later sources, she did not set any official world records at the 1932 trials; some of her marks were superior to the listed world records, but inferior to still-pending marks by other athletes that were subsequently ratified.

=== Trials ===
| Event | First | | Second | | Third | |
|---|---|---|---|---|---|---|
| 100 meters | Ethel Harrington | 12.3 | Wilhelmina von Bremen | 12.4e | Elizabeth Wilde | 12.4e |
| 80 meter hurdles | Babe Didrikson | 12.1 | Evelyne Hall | 12.1e | Simone Schaller | |
| High jump | Babe Didrikson; Jean Shiley | 5 ft 3 3/16 in (1.60 m) AR | | | Annette Rogers | 5 ft 2 in (1.57 m) |
| Discus throw | Ruth Osburn | 133 ft 3/4 in (40.55 m) AR | Margaret Jenkins | 127 ft 1/2 in (38.72 m) | Lillian Copeland | |
| Javelin throw | Babe Didrikson | 139 ft 3 in (42.44 m) | Nan Gindele | | Gloria Russell | |

The 100 meters was Babe Didrikson's weakest event; she was eliminated in the semi-finals. Harrington, the eventual winner, mistook the finish line in the preliminaries and stopped running too early; although she was eliminated from the AAU championships as a result, she was allowed to run in the final for trials purposes. Von Bremen, who finished second, won the AAU title.

In the 80 m hurdles, Didrikson and Evelyne Hall almost dead-heated, but Didrikson was declared the winner; the same thing happened again at the Olympics. In the high jump, Didrikson and Jean Shiley tied for first, both setting a new American record. Osburn set an American record in the discus throw, winning from Jenkins and the eventual Olympic champion, Copeland; Didrikson, who was relatively unfamiliar with this event, placed fourth. Nan Gindele had set a world record in the javelin four weeks before the trials, but failed to replicate that form at the trials; Didrikson won with a personal best.

=== Other AAU championship events ===
| Event | First | | Second | Third |
|---|---|---|---|---|
| 50 yards | Dorothy Nussbaum | 6.3 | Mary Ladewig | Alice Monk |
| 220 yards | Olive Hasenfus | 26.5 | Marie DeMay | Olive Kruger |
| 4 × 110 yards relay | Illinois Women's AC | 49.4 | Illinois Women's AC B | Tower Grove Quarry AC |
| Long jump | Babe Didrikson | 17 ft 6 1/8 in (5.33 m) | Nellie Todd | Margaret Jordan |
| Shot put | Babe Didrikson | 39 ft 6 1/4 in (12.04 m) | Rena MacDonald | Carolyn Yetter |
| Baseball throw | Babe Didrikson | 272 ft 2 in (82.95 m) | Gloria Russell | Nan Gindele |

These events were not contested at the Olympics, but were part of the AAU national championships. Apart from the relay, the 50 yard and 220 yard dashes were the only events in the 1932 program in which Didrikson did not compete; she won all of the other AAU-only events, though she did not approach her baseball world best of 296 ft (90.22 m) from the 1931 championships.
