= List of male hurdlers =

This is a list of notable male hurdlers (110 m H- 400 m H) since the first Olympic Games in 1896.

This list includes athletes who have been a medalist in the Olympic Games or World championships (indoor and outdoor). Also included are medalists in the IAAF World Cup and WAF events. Other criteria for inclusion include any athlete who held a world record (WR) or was ranked in the top three of their event by Track and Field News magazine (rankings since 1947). Finally, it includes any athlete ranked (by time) in the top three of a hurdles event for any given year since 1980.

Key for abbreviations used: WR is world record, + designates a hand timed result, OG means Olympic champion for given year/s, WC means world champion for the given year/s.

== A ==
- Derrick Adkins USA, 400 m H,
  WC 1995
  OG 400 m H, 1996
- John Akii-Bua UGA, 400 m H,
  OG 1972
  WR 47.82 2 September 1972
- Kriss Akabusi GBR
- Mubarak Al-Nubi QAT
- Hadi Soua'an Al-Somaily KSA
- Henry Amike NGR
- Jeshua Anderson USA
- Steve Anderson USA
- Henry Andrade USA CPV
- Eronilde de Araújo BRA
- Vasyl Arkhypenko URS (UKR)
- Lesley Ashburner USA
- Sydney Atkinson SAF, 110 m H,
  OG 1928
- Dick Attlesey USA, 110 m H
  WR 13.6+ 10 June 1950,
  WR 13.5+ 24 June 1950,

== B ==
- Charles Bacon USA, 400 m H,
  OG 1908,
  WR 55.0+ July 1908
- Falk Balzer GER
- Harold Barron USA
- Percy Beard USA, 110 m H,
  WR 14.4+ 23 June 1932,
  WR 14.3+ 26 July 1934,
  WR 14.2+ 6 August 1934,
- Volker Beck GDR, 400 m H,
  OG 1980
- Jim Bolding USA, 400 m H
- Shaun Bownes RSA
- Bryan Bronson USA
- Arto Bryggare FIN
- David Burghley GBR, 400 m H,
  OG 1928

== C ==
- Lee Calhoun USA, 110 m H,
  OG 1956, 1960
  WR 13.2+ 21 August 1960
- Milt Campbell USA, 110 m H
- Tonie Campbell USA
- James Carter USA
- Alejandro Casañas CUB, 110 m H,
  WR 13.21 21 August 1977
- Frank Castleman USA
- Warren "Rex" Cawley USA, 400 m H,
  OG 1964
  WR 49.1+ 13 September 1964
- David Cecil
- Roy Cochran USA, 400 m H,
  OG 1948
- Wayne Collett USA, 400 m H
- John Collier USA
- Dedy Cooper, 110 m H
- John Cooper GBR
- Mark Crear USA
- Frank Cuhel USA
- Josh Culbreath USA, 400 m H
- Thomas Curtis USA, 110 m H,
  OG 1896
- Cliff Cushman USA

== D ==
- Willie Davenport USA, 110 m H,
  OG 1968 OG;
  WR 13.33 17 October 1968,
  WR 13.2+ 4 July 1969 WR
- Calvin Davis USA
- Glenn Davis USA, 400 m H
  OG 1956, 1960,
  WR 49.5+ 29 June 1956,
  WR 49.2+ 6 August 1958,
- Jack Davis USA, 110 m H,
  WR 13.4+ 22 June 1956
- Anthony Dees USA
- August Desch USA
- Amadou Dia Bâ SEN
- Stéphane Diagana FRA, 400 m H,
  WC 1997
- Harrison Dillard USA, 110 m H,
  OG 1952
- Craig Dixon USA
- Dudley Dorival HAI
- Ladji Doucouré FRA 110 m H
- Guy Drut FRA, 110 m H,
  OG 1976
  WR 13.0+ 22 August 1975
- Juan Carlos Dyrzka ARG, 400 m H
- John Duda LA CITY Champion 1961 180yd low hurdles.

== F ==
- Earl Fee CAN Masters world record holder
- Don Finlay GBR
- Charles Foster USA
- Greg Foster USA, 110 m H,
  WC 1983, 1987, 1991
- Roberto Frinolli ITA, 400 m H

== G ==
- Anier García CUB, 110 m H,
  OG 2000
- John Garrels USA
- Willie Gault USA
- Yevgeniy Gavrilenko URS (BLR)
- John Gibson USA, 400 m H,
  WR 52.6+ 2 July 1927
- Grantley Goulding GBR
- Winthrop Graham JAM

== H ==
- Ervin Hall USA, 110 m H, 13.38 17 October 1968,
  WR 13.2+ 19 June 1969
- Glenn Hardin USA, 400 m H,
  OG 1936
  WR 52.0+ August 1932,
  WR 51.8+ 30 June 1934,
  WR 50.6+ 26 July 1934
- Danny Harris USA
- Martin Hawkins USA
- Alfred Healey GBR
- David Hemery GBR, 400 m H,
  OG 1968
  WR 48.12 15 October 1968
- Gerhard Hennige FRG
- Llewellyn Herbert RSA
- Thomas Hill USA, 110 m H,
  WR 13.2+ 13 June 1970
- Harry Hillman USA, 400 m H,
  OG 1900
- Dick Howard USA

== I ==
- Periklis Iakovakis GRE

== J ==
- Bershawn Jackson USA, 400 m H
  WC 2005
- Colin Jackson GBR, 110 m H,
  WC 1993, 1999
  WR 12.91 20 August 1993
- Helmut Janz FRG, 400 m H 4th place 1960 Olympics
- Tony Jarrett GBR
- Allen Johnson USA, 110 m H,
  WC 1995, 1997, 2001, 2003
  OG 1996
- Hayes Jones USA, 110 m H,
  OG 1964

== K ==
- Igors Kazanovs URS (LAT)
- Naman Keïta FRA
- Jack Keller USA, 110 m H,
  WR 14.4+ 17 July 1932
- Fred Kelly USA, 110 m H,
  OG 1912;
- Aleksandr Kharlov URS (UZB)
- James King USA
- Roger Kingdom USA, 110 m H,
  OG 1984, 1988
  WR 12.92 16 August 1989
- Daniel Kinsey USA, 110 m H,
  OG 1924
- Gary Knoke AUS, 400 m H
- Igor Kovác SVK
- Alvin Kraenzlein USA, 110 m H,
  OG 1900

== L ==
- Rune Larsson SWE
- Martin Lauer FRG, 110 m H,
  WR 13.2+ 7 July 1959
- Robert Leavitt USA, 110 m H,
  OG 1906
- Nick Lee USA, 400 m H
- Blaine Lindgren USA
- Yuriy Lituyev URS (RUS), 400 m H,
  WR 50.4+ September 1953
- John Loaring CAN
- Frank Loomis USA, 400 m H,
  OG 1920
  WR 54.0+ 16 August 1920
- Liu Xiang CHN, 110 m H,
  OG 2004

== M ==
- Ralph Mann USA, 400 m H
- Ruslan Mashchenko RUS, 400 m H
- Samuel Matete ZAM, 400 m H,
  WC 1991
- Ralph Maxwell USA Masters M90 world record
- Willie May USA, 110 m H
- Earl McCullouch USA, 110 m H,
  WR 13.43 June 1967
- Danny McFarlane JAM
- John McLean USA
- Omar McLeod JAM
- Mark McKoy CAN/AUT, 110 m H,
  OG 1992
- Joel McNulty USA, 110 m H
- Anatoliy Mikhailov URS (RUS)
- Aries Merritt USA, 110 m H
- Rod Milburn USA, 110 m H,
  OG 1972
  WR 13.24 2 September 1972
- Fred Moloney USA
- Charles Moore USA, 400 m H,
  OG 1952
- Tom Moore, USA 120 y H
  =WR 14.2h
- Javier Moracho ESP
- Salvatore Morale ITA, 400 m H,
  WR 49.2+ 14 September 1962
- Alvin Moreau USA,
  WR 14.2+ 2 August 1935
- Dinsdale Morgan JAM
- Fabrizio Mori ITA, 400 m H,
  WC 1999
- John Morris USA,
  WR 14.4+ 8 September 1933
- Edwin Moses USA, 400 m H,
  WC 1983, 1987
  OG 1976, 1984
  WR 47.64 25 July 1976,
  WR 47.45 11 June 1977,
  WR 47.13 3 July 1980,
  WR 47.02 31 August 1983
- Thomas Munkelt GDR, 110 m H,
  OG 1980

== N ==
- Jean-Claude Nallet FRA, 400 m H
- Renaldo Nehemiah USA, 110 m H,
  WR 13.16 14 April 1979,
  WR 13.00 6 May 1979,
  WR 12.93 19 August 1981
- John Norton USA, 400 m H,
  WR 54.2+ 26 June 1920
- Aarne Nirk
- Sven Nylander (SWE)

== O ==
- Gary Oakes GBR
- Staņislavs Olijars LAT
- George Orton CAN (USA)
- Eddy Ottoz ITA
- Laurent Ottoz ITA
- Patrick Ottoz ITA

== P ==
- Hansle Parchment JAM
- David Patrick USA 400 m IH 47.75
- Sten Pettersson SWE, 110 m H,
  WR 14.8+ 18 September 1927
  WR 400 m H, 53.8+ 4 October 1925
- Andre Phillips USA, 400 m H,
  OG 1988
- Jack Pierce USA
- George Poage USA
- Fritz Pollard, Jr. USA
- George Porter USA HSR 300 IH 35.32 / 400 IH 49.19
- William Porter USA, 110 m H,
  OG 1948
- Gert Potgieter SA, 400 m H
- Norman Pritchard IND
- Aleksandr Puchkov URS (RUS)

== R ==
- Chris Rawlinson GBR
- Jon Ridgeon GBR, 110 m H
- Ivan Riley USA
- Duane Ross USA

== S ==
- George Saling USA, 110 m H,
  OG 1932
  WR 14.4+ 2 August 1932
- Félix Sánchez DOM, 400 m H,
  WC 2001, 2003
  OG 2004, 2012
- Marcel Schelbert SUI
- Harald Schmid FRG
- Florian Schwarthoff GER
- Fred Schule USA, 110 m H,
  OG 1904
- Harry Schulting NED
- Clyde Scott USA, 110 m H
- Joel Shankle USA
- Arthur Shaw USA
- John Sherwood GBR
- Thaddeus Shideler USA
- Mike Shine USA
- Don Shy USA, 110 m H
- Bengt Sjöstedt FIN, 110 m H,
  WR 14.4+ 5 September 1931
- Vyacheslav Skomorokhov URS, 400 m H
- Forrest Smithson USA, 110 m H,
  OG 1908
  WR 15.0+ 27 July 1908
- Eddie Southern USA
- Don Styron USA still holds WR 21.9 1960 in 200 m and 220y Hurdles

== T ==
- Dai Tamesue JPN
- Jerry Tarr USA, 110 m H
- Henri Tauzin FRA
- Angelo Taylor USA, 400 m H,
  OG 2000
- Morgan Taylor USA, 400 m H,
  OG 1924
  WR 52.0+ July 1928
- Walter Tewksbury USA, 400 m H,
  OG 1896
- Kemel Thompson JAM
- Earl Thomson CAN, 110 m H,
  OG 1920
  WR 14.8+ 18 August 1920
- Bob Tisdall IRL, 400 m H,
  OG 1932
- Reggie Torian USA
- Milan Tosnar CZE
- Forrest "Spec" Towns, 110 m H,
  OG 1936
  WR 14.1+ 19 June 1936,
  WR 14.1+ 6 August 1936,
  WR 13.7+ 27 August 1936
- Terrence Trammell USA
- Jimmy Tremeer GBR
- Alberto Triulzi ARG, 110 m H
- Oleg Tverdokhleb UKR

== U ==
- Sergey Usov URS (EUN)

== V ==
- Emilio Valle CUB
- Geoff Vanderstock USA, 400 m H,
  WR 48.6+ 11 September 1968
- Attie van Heerden RSA
- Erik Vilen FIN

== W ==
- Larry Wade, 110 m H
- Fred Wolcott USA, 110 m H,
  WR 13.7+ 29 June 1941
- James Walker USA, 400 m H
- Nigel Walker GBR
- Frank Waller USA
- James Wendell USA
- George Weightman-Smith RSA,
  WR 14.6+ 31 July 1928
- Eric Wennström SWE, 110 m H,
  WR 14.4+ 25 August 1929
- Duncan White CEY
- Miguel White PHI
- Ron Whitney USA, 400 m H
- Maurice Wignall JAM
- Jerry Wilson USA, 110 m H
- Miroslaw Wodzynski POL, 110 m H
- Joey Woody USA
- Reggie Wyatt USA 300 m IH HSR 35.02 400 m IH 49.46-2010

Karsten Warholm – 45.94 WR 2021

== Y ==
- Kevin Young USA,
  OG 1992
  WC 1993
  WR 46.78 August 1992

== Z ==
- Torrance Zellner, 400 m H
