= Athletics at the 1932 Summer Olympics – Men's 110 metres hurdles =

Men's 110 metres hurdles at the Games of the X Olympiad
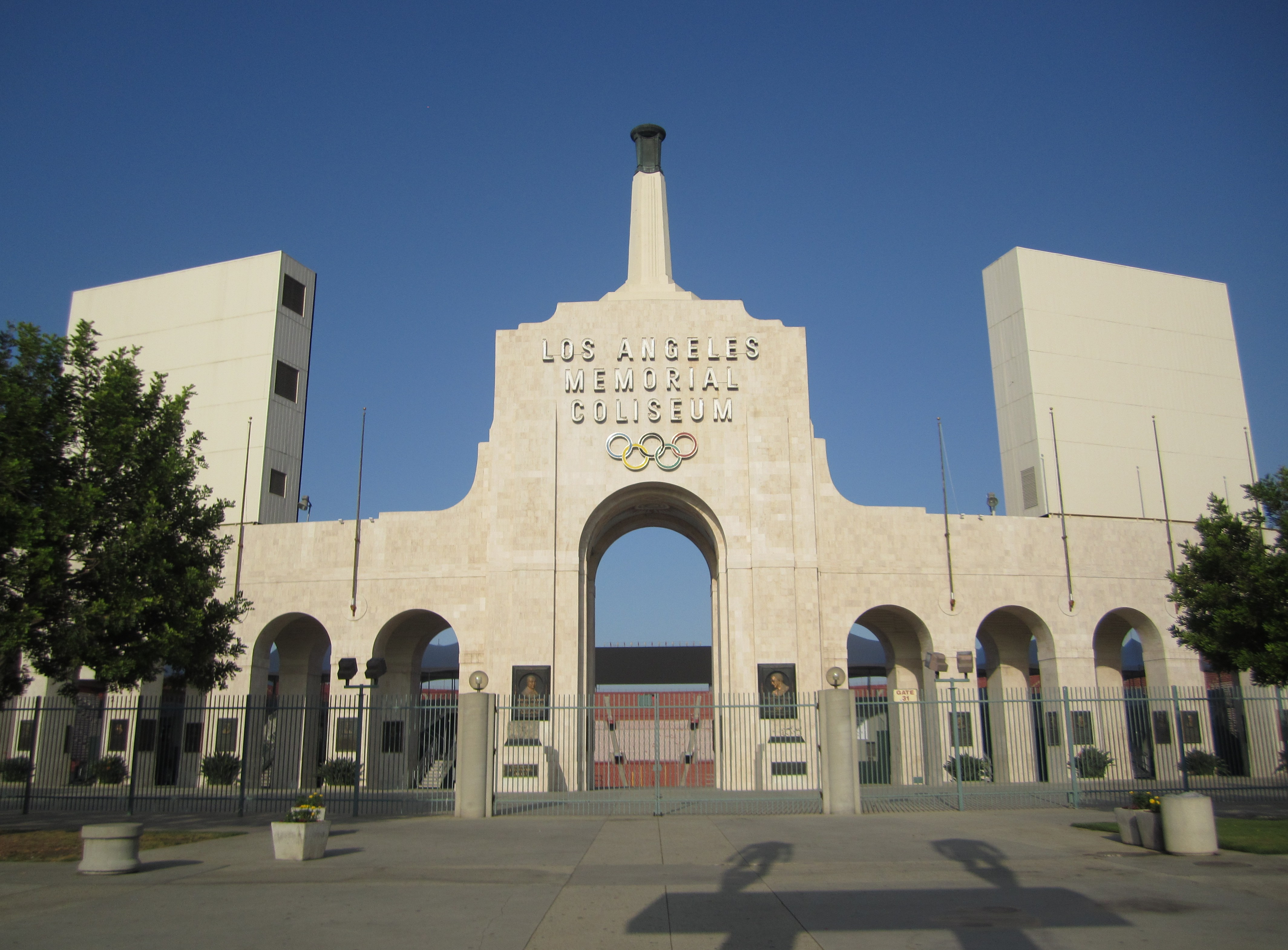
- Entrance to the Los Angeles Memorial Coliseum (2012)
- Venue: Los Angeles Memorial Coliseum
- Dates: August 2, 1932 (round 1 and semifinals); August 3, 1932 (final)
- Competitors: 17 from 10 nations
- Winning time: 14.6

Medalists
1st place, gold medalist(s)		George Saling; United States
2nd place, silver medalist(s)		Percy Beard; United States
3rd place, bronze medalist(s)		Don Finlay; Great Britain

The men's 110 metres hurdles hurdling event at the 1932 Summer Olympics took place on August 2 and August 3 at the Los Angeles Memorial Coliseum. Seventeen athletes from 10 nations competed. The 1930 Olympic Congress in Berlin had reduced the limit from 4 athletes per NOC to 3 athletes. The event was won by George Saling of the United States, the first in a streak of nine victories by the Americans (and the seventh overall gold medal for the United States in the 110 metres hurdles). It initially appeared that the Americans had swept the medals, but film review showed that Don Finlay had come in third over Jack Keller; this gave Great Britain its first medal in the event since 1896.

== Background ==
This was the ninth appearance of the event, which is one of 12 athletics events to have been held at every Summer Olympics. None of the finalists from 1928 returned. Percy Beard and Jack Keller of the United States and Bengt Sjöstedt of Finland each had tied the world record before the Games.

For the first time, no nations made their debut in the 110 metres hurdles. The United States made its ninth appearance, the only nation to have competed in the 110 metres hurdles in each Games to that point.

== Competition format ==
The competition used the three-round basic format introduced in 1908. The first round consisted of four heats, with between 3 and 6 hurdlers each. The top three hurdlers in each heat advanced to the semifinals. The 12 semifinalists were divided into two semifinals of 6 hurdlers each; the top three hurdlers in each advanced to the 6-man final.

== Records ==
These were the standing world and Olympic records (in seconds) prior to the 1932 Summer Olympics.

World record	Eric Wennström (SWE)	14.4	Stockholm, Sweden	25 August 1929
Olympic record	George Weightman-Smith (RSA)	14.6	Amsterdam, Netherlands	31 July 1928

Jack Keller broke the Olympic record in the first semifinal, setting a new time at 14.5 seconds. George Saling bettered it in the second semifinal, dropping the Olympic record to 14.4 seconds—equal to the world record.

== Schedule ==
Date	Time	Round
Tuesday, 2 August 1932	14:30; 16:15	Round 1 Semifinals
Wednesday, 3 August 1932	15:45	Final

== Results ==
=== Round 1 ===
Four heats were held; the fastest three runners advanced to the semifinal round.

==== Heat 1 ====
Rank	Athlete	Nation	Time (hand)	Time (auto)	Notes
1	Percy Beard	United States	14.7	14.80	Q
2	Roland Harper	Great Britain	14.9	—	Q
3	Erwin Wegner	Germany	15.1	—	Q
4	Sylvio Padilha	Brazil	15.4	—	

==== Heat 2 ====
Rank	Athlete	Nation	Time (hand)	Time (auto)	Notes
1	Don Finlay	Great Britain	14.8	14.84	Q
2	George Saling	United States	15.0	—	Q
3	Tatsuzo Fujita	Japan	15.1	—	Q

==== Heat 3 ====
Rank	Athlete	Nation	Time (hand)	Time (auto)	Notes
1	Willi Welscher	Germany	14.8	15.02	Q
2	Bengt Sjöstedt	Finland	14.9	—	Q
3	Bunoo Sutton	India	15.1	—	Q
4	Art Ravensdale	Canada	15.2	—	
5	Antônio Giusfredi	Brazil	15.3	—	
6	Federico Gamboa	Mexico	15.4	—	

==== Heat 4 ====
Rank	Athlete	Nation	Time (hand)	Time (auto)	Notes
1	Jack Keller	United States	14.9	15.01	Q
2	Khristos Mantikas	Greece	15.1	—	Q
3	Lord Burghley	Great Britain	15.1	—	Q
4	Roberto Sánchez	Mexico	15.7	—	

=== Semifinals ===
Two heats were held; the fastest three runners advanced to the final.

==== Semifinal 1 ====
Rank	Athlete	Nation	Time (hand)	Time (auto)	Notes
1	Jack Keller	United States	14.5	14.63	Q, OR
2	Lord Burghley	Great Britain	14.6	—	Q
3	Don Finlay	Great Britain	14.6	—	Q
4	Bunoo Sutton	India	Unknown	—	
5	Bengt Sjöstedt	Finland	Unknown	—	
6	Erwin Wegner	Germany	Unknown	—	

==== Semifinal 2 ====
Mantikas was disqualified for knocking down three hurdles.

Rank	Athlete	Nation	Time (hand)	Time (auto)	Notes
1	George Saling	United States	14.4	14.55	Q, =WR, OR
2	Percy Beard	United States	14.6	—	Q
3	Willi Welscher	Germany	14.8	—	Q
4	Tatsuzo Fujita	Japan	14.8	—	
5	Roland Harper	Great Britain	14.9	—	
—	Khristos Mantikas	Greece	DSQ	—	

=== Final ===
Rank	Athlete	Nation	Time (hand)	Time (auto)
1st place, gold medalist(s)	George Saling	United States	14.6	14.57
2nd place, silver medalist(s)	Percy Beard	United States	14.7	14.69
3rd place, bronze medalist(s)	Don Finlay	Great Britain	14.8	14.74
4	Jack Keller	United States	14.8	14.81
5	Lord Burghley	Great Britain	14.8	14.83
—	Willi Welscher	Germany	DSQ	—
