= Athletics at the 1932 Summer Olympics – Men's 400 metres =

Men's 400 metres at the Games of the X Olympiad
- Venue: Los Angeles Memorial Coliseum
- Dates: August 4, 1932 (heats and quarterfinals); August 5, 1932 (semifinals and final)
- Competitors: 27 from 15 nations
- Winning time: 46.2 WR

Medalists
1st place, gold medalist(s)		Bill Carr; United States
2nd place, silver medalist(s)		Ben Eastman; United States
3rd place, bronze medalist(s)		Alex Wilson; Canada

The men's 400 metres sprint event at the 1932 Olympic Games took place on August 4 and August 5 at the Los Angeles Memorial Coliseum. Twenty-seven athletes from 15 nations competed. The 1930 Olympic Congress in Berlin had reduced the limit from 4 athletes per NOC to 3 athletes. The event was won by Bill Carr of the United States, that nation's second consecutive title and sixth overall in the event (all by different men). Ben Eastman's silver marked the first time countrymen had gone one-two in the event since the United States did it at the first three Olympics (1896, 1900, and 1904, including a podium sweep in 1904).

== Background ==
This was the ninth appearance of the event, which is one of 12 athletics events to have been held at every Summer Olympics. The defending gold medalist, Ray Barbuti of the United States, did not return, but 1928 silver medalist Jimmy Ball of Canada and bronze medalist Joachim Büchner of Germany did. The United States had a strong team, led by Ben Eastman (who had just set the world record at 46.4 seconds) and Bill Carr (who had beaten Eastman at the U.S. Olympic trials and the IC4A championships).

New Zealand appeared in the event for the first time. The United States made its ninth appearance in the event, the only nation to compete in it at every Olympic Games to that point.

== Competition format ==
The competition retained the basic four-round format from 1920. With fewer athletes than previous editions, the first round was reduced to 6 heats (vs. 15 in 1928). Each heat had between 4 and 6 athletes. The top three runners in each heat advanced to the quarterfinals. There were 3 quarterfinals of 6 runners each; the top four athletes in each quarterfinal heat advanced to the semifinals. The semifinals featured 2 heats of 6 runners each. The top two runners in each semifinal heat advanced, making a six-man final.

== Records ==
These were the standing world and Olympic records (in seconds) prior to the 1924 Summer Olympics.

World record	Ben Eastman (USA)	46.4y	Palo Alto, United States	26 March 1932
Olympic record	Eric Liddell (GBR)	47.6	Paris, France	11 July 1924

Bill Carr broke the Olympic record in the semifinals (with a 47.2 second mark) and the world record in the final (officially at 46.2 seconds, auto-timed at 46.28 seconds).

== Schedule ==
Date	Time	Round
Thursday, 4 August 1932	14:30; 16:00	Heats; Quarterfinals
Friday, 5 August 1932	14:30; 16:30	Semifinals; Final

== Results ==
=== Heats ===
Six heats were held; the fastest three runners advanced to the quarterfinal round.

==== Heat 1 ====
Rank	Athlete	Nation	Time	Notes
1	Adolf Metzner	Germany	50.4	Q
2	Seikan Oki	Japan	50.5	Q
3	Alex Wilson	Canada	50.5	Q
4	Kell Areskoug	Sweden	50.7	

==== Heat 2 ====
Rank	Athlete	Nation	Time	Notes
1	Ben Eastman	United States	49.0	Q
2	Joachim Büchner	Germany	49.3	Q
3	Hjalmar Johannessen	Norway	49.5	Q
4	Carlos de Anda	Mexico	49.8	

==== Heat 3 ====
Rank	Athlete	Nation	Time	Notes
1	Börje Strandvall	Finland	49.8	Q
2	Jimmy Ball	Canada	50.0	Q
3	Iwao Masuda	Japan	50.1	Q
4	Sten Pettersson	Sweden	50.2	

==== Heat 4 ====
Rank	Athlete	Nation	Time	Notes
1	Bill Carr	United States	48.8	Q
2	George Golding	Australia	49.0	Q
3	Crew Stoneley	Great Britain	49.1	Q
4	Walter Nehb	Germany	49.4	
5	Khristos Mantikas	Greece	49.6	
6	Manuel Álvarez	Mexico	49.9	

==== Heat 5 ====
Rank	Athlete	Nation	Time	Notes
1	Felix Rinner	Austria	49.2	Q
2	Godfrey Rampling	Great Britain	49.5	Q
3	Willie Walters	South Africa	49.8	Q
4	Stuart Black	New Zealand	49.9	
5	Seiken Cho	Japan	50.0	

==== Heat 6 ====
Rank	Athlete	Nation	Time	Notes
1	James Gordon	United States	50.6	Q
2	Ray Lewis	Canada	50.7	Q
3	Domingos Puglisi	Brazil	50.8	Q
4	Richard Arguello	Mexico	50.9	

=== Quarterfinals ===
Three heats were held; the four fastest runners in each heat advanced to the semifinal round.

==== Quarterfinal 1 ====
Rank	Athlete	Nation	Time	Notes
1	Bill Carr	United States	48.4	Q
2	Willie Walters	South Africa	48.5	Q
3	George Golding	Australia	48.6	Q
4	Alex Wilson	Canada	49.6	Q
5	Domingos Puglisi	Brazil	50.1	
6	Iwao Masuda	Japan	Unknown	

==== Quarterfinal 2 ====
Rank	Athlete	Nation	Time	Notes
1	James Gordon	United States	48.6	Q
2	Godfrey Rampling	Great Britain	48.8	Q
3	Joachim Büchner	Germany	48.9	Q
4	Jimmy Ball	Canada	49.3	Q
5	Hjalle Johannesen	Norway	49.4	
6	Seikan Oki	Japan	Unknown	

==== Quarterfinal 3 ====
Rank	Athlete	Nation	Time	Notes
1	Ben Eastman	United States	48.8	Q
2	Felix Rinner	Austria	48.9	Q
3	Börje Strandvall	Finland	49.0	Q
4	Crew Stoneley	Great Britain	49.1	Q
5	Ray Lewis	Canada	49.1	
6	Adolf Metzner	Germany	49.2	

=== Semifinals ===
Two heats were held; the fastest three runners advanced to the final round.

==== Semifinal 1 ====
Rank	Athlete	Nation	Time	Notes
1	Bill Carr	United States	47.2	Q, OR
2	Alex Wilson	Canada	47.8	Q
3	George Golding	Australia	48.0	Q
4	Godfrey Rampling	Great Britain	48.0	
5	Felix Rinner	Austria	48.8	
6	Joachim Büchner	Germany	49.2	

==== Semifinal 2 ====
Rank	Athlete	Nation	Time	Notes
1	Ben Eastman	United States	47.6	Q
2	Willie Walters	South Africa	48.2	Q
3	James Gordon	United States	48.2	Q
4	Börje Strandvall	Finland	48.4	
5	Crew Stoneley	Great Britain	48.6	
6	Jimmy Ball	Canada	49.0	

=== Final ===
Rank	Lane	Athlete	Nation	Time	Notes
1st place, gold medalist(s)	4	Bill Carr	United States	46.28	WR
2nd place, silver medalist(s)	2	Ben Eastman	United States	46.50	
3rd place, bronze medalist(s)	3	Alex Wilson	Canada	47.4	
4	1	Willie Walters	South Africa	48.2	
5	5	James Gordon	United States	48.2	
6	6	George Golding	Australia	48.8	
