= Athletics at the 1932 Summer Olympics – Men's 4 × 400 metres relay =

Men's 4 × 400 metres relay at the Games of the X Olympiad
- Venue: Los Angeles Memorial Coliseum
- Dates: August 6 and August 7, 1932

Medalists
1st place, gold medalist(s)		Ivan Fuqua; Ed Ablowich; Karl Warner; Bill Carr; United States
2nd place, silver medalist(s)		Crew Stoneley; Tommy Hampson; Lord Burghley; Godfrey Rampling; Great Britain
3rd place, bronze medalist(s)		Ray Lewis; Jimmy Ball; Phil Edwards; Alex Wilson; Canada

The men's 4 × 400 metres relay event at the 1932 Summer Olympics took place on August 6 and August 7 at the Los Angeles Memorial Coliseum.

== Results ==
=== Heats ===
Two heats were held; the fastest three times advanced to the final round.

Heat one

Rank	Name	Nationality	Time	Notes
1	Ivan Fuqua; Ed Ablowich; Karl Warner; Bill Carr	United States	3:11.8	WR, Q
2	Giacomo Carlini; Giovanni Turba; Mario De Negri; Luigi Facelli	Italy	3:22.8	Q
3	Joachim Büchner; Walter Nehb; Adolf Metzner; Otto Peltzer	Germany	3:25.4	Q

Heat Two

Rank	Name	Nationality	Time	Notes
1	Itaro Nakajima; Iwao Masuda; Seikan Oki; Teiichi Nishi	Japan	3:16.8	Q
2	Crew Stoneley; Tommy Hampson; Lord Burghley; Godfrey Rampling	Great Britain	3:21.8	Q
3	Ray Lewis; Jimmy Ball; Phil Edwards; Alex Wilson	Canada	3:21.8	Q
4	Ricardo Arguello; Jesús Moraila; Manuel Álvarez; Carlos de Anda	Mexico	3:28.5	

=== Final ===
Rank	Name	Nationality	Time	Notes
1st place, gold medalist(s)	Ivan Fuqua; Ed Ablowich; Karl Warner; Bill Carr	United States	3:08.14	WR
2nd place, silver medalist(s)	Crew Stoneley; Tommy Hampson; Lord Burghley; Godfrey Rampling	Great Britain	3:11.2	
3rd place, bronze medalist(s)	Ray Lewis; Jimmy Ball; Phil Edwards; Alex Wilson	Canada	3:12.8	
4	Joachim Büchner; Walter Nehb; Adolf Metzner; Otto Peltzer	Germany	3:14.4	
5	Itaro Nakajima; Iwao Masuda; Seikan Oki; Teiichi Nishi	Japan	3:14.6	
6	Giacomo Carlini; Giovanni Turba; Mario De Negri; Luigi Facelli	Italy	3:17.8	

Key: WR = world record
