= Men's 110 metres hurdles world record progression =

The following table shows the world record progression in the men's 110 metres hurdles.

The first world record in the 110 metres hurdles for men (athletics) was recognized by the International Amateur Athletics Federation, now known as the International Association of Athletics Federations, in 1912. The IAAF ratified Forrest Smithson's 15.0 mark set at the 1908 London Olympic Games as the inaugural record.

To June 21, 2009, the IAAF has ratified 39 world records in the event.

== Records 1912–1976 ==
Time	Wind	Auto	Athlete	Nationality	Location of race	Date
15.0			Forrest Smithson	United States	London	25 July 1908
15.0			Harold Barron	United States	Antwerp	17 August 1920
15.0			Earl Thomson	Canada	Antwerp	17 August 1920
14.8			Earl Thomson	Canada	Antwerp	18 August 1920
14.8			Sten Pettersson	Sweden	Stockholm	18 September 1927
14.6			George Weightman-Smith	South Africa	Amsterdam	31 July 1928
14.4			Eric Wennström	Sweden	Stockholm	25 August 1929
14.4			Bengt Sjöstedt	Finland	Helsinki	5 September 1931
14.4			Percy Beard	United States	Cambridge	23 June 1932
14.4	−0.2	14.53	Jack Keller	United States	Palo Alto	17 July 1932
14.4			George Saling	United States	Los Angeles	2 August 1932
14.4			John Morriss	United States	Budapest	12 August 1933
14.4			John Morriss	United States	Turin	8 September 1933
14.3			Percy Beard	United States	Stockholm	26 July 1934
14.2			Percy Beard	United States	Oslo	6 August 1934
14.2			Alvin Moreau	United States	Oslo	2 August 1935
14.1w	2.4		Forrest Towns	United States	Chicago	19 June 1936
14.1	1.3		Forrest Towns	United States	Berlin	6 August 1936
13.7	0.0		Forrest Towns	United States	Oslo	27 August 1936
13.7	0.0		Fred Wolcott	United States	Philadelphia	29 June 1941
13.6	0.9		Richard Attlesey	United States	College Park	24 June 1950
13.5			Richard Attlesey	United States	Helsinki	10 July 1950
13.4	0.0		Jack Davis	United States	Bakersfield	22 June 1956
13.2	1.9	13.56	Martin Lauer	West Germany	Zurich	7 July 1959
13.2	0.0		Lee Calhoun	United States	Bern	21 August 1960
13.2	1.8	13.43	Earl McCullouch	United States	Minneapolis	16 July 1967
13.2	−0.9		Willie Davenport	United States	Zurich	4 July 1969
13.2	0.0	13.24	Rod Milburn	United States	Munich	7 September 1972
13.1	1.1	13.41	Rod Milburn	United States	Zurich	6 July 1973
13.1	1.5		Rod Milburn	United States	Siena	22 July 1973
13.1	1.2		Guy Drut	France	Saint Maur	23 July 1975
13.0	1.8		Guy Drut	France	West Berlin	22 August 1975

== Records 1977–present ==
Ratified
Not ratified
Ratified but later rescinded
Pending ratification

From 1975, the IAAF accepted separate automatically electronically timed records for events up to 400 metres. Starting January 1, 1977, the IAAF required fully automatic timing to the hundredth of a second for these events.

Rod Milburn's 1972 Olympic gold medal victory time of 13.24 was the fastest recorded result to that time.

Time	Wind	Athlete	Nationality	Location of race	Date
13.24	0.0	Rod Milburn	United States	Munich	7 September 1972
13.21	0.6	Alejandro Casañas	Cuba	Sofia	21 August 1977
13.16	1.7	Renaldo Nehemiah	United States	San Jose	14 April 1979
13.00	0.9	Renaldo Nehemiah	United States	Westwood	6 May 1979
12.93	−0.2	Renaldo Nehemiah	United States	Zürich	19 August 1981
12.92	−0.1	Roger Kingdom	United States	Zürich	16 August 1989
12.91	0.5	Colin Jackson	United Kingdom	Stuttgart	20 August 1993
12.91	0.3	Liu Xiang	China	Athens	27 August 2004
12.88	1.1	Liu Xiang	China	Lausanne	11 July 2006
12.87	0.9	Dayron Robles	Cuba	Ostrava	12 June 2008
12.80	0.3	Aries Merritt	United States	Brussels	7 September 2012
12.75	1.0	Ja'Kobe Tharp	United States	Eugene	10 June 2026
