= Ed Ablowich =

American sprinter (1913–1998)

Olympic medal record

Men's athletics

Representing the United States
Gold medal – first place	1932 Los Angeles	4 × 400 m relay

Edgar Allen Ablowich (April 29, 1913 – April 6, 1998) was an American athlete who was a member of the gold medal-winning team in the 4 × 400 m relay at the 1932 Summer Olympics, along with Ivan Fuqua, Karl Warner and Bill Carr.

Born in Greenville, Texas, Ablowich attended the University of Southern California. He ran the second leg for the American 4 × 400 m relay team, which won the gold medal with a new world record of 3:08.2 at the Olympics in Los Angeles, shaving more than three seconds off the world record they set in their preliminary heat. The record stood for 20 years until it was broken by the Jamaican team at the 1952 Summer Olympics in Helsinki. Ablowich later finished third in the 440 m at the 1933 NCAA championships, and second in the 400 m hurdles at the 1934 AAU championships.

After his running career, Ablowich was an associate professor in business at the Air Force Institute of Technology at the University of Wyoming. His son Ron competed as a hurdler at the 1960 Olympic trials while he was a student at Georgia Tech.

Ablowich died in Virginia Beach, Virginia, aged 84.
