= Tatsuzō =

- Gender: Male

Origin
- Origin: Japanese
- Meaning: Different meanings depending on the kanji used

Tatsuzō, Tatsuzo or Tatsuzou (written: 達三, 辰三 or 達蔵) is a masculine Japanese given name. Notable people with the name include:

- Tatsuzo Fujita (藤田 辰三; 1908–?), Japanese hurdler
- Tatsuzō Ishikawa (石川 達三; 1905–1985), Japanese writer
- Tatsuzō Shimaoka (島岡 達三; 1919–2007), Japanese potter
- Sone Tatsuzō (曽禰 達蔵; 1853–1937), Japanese architect
