= 1932 NCAA Track and Field Championships =

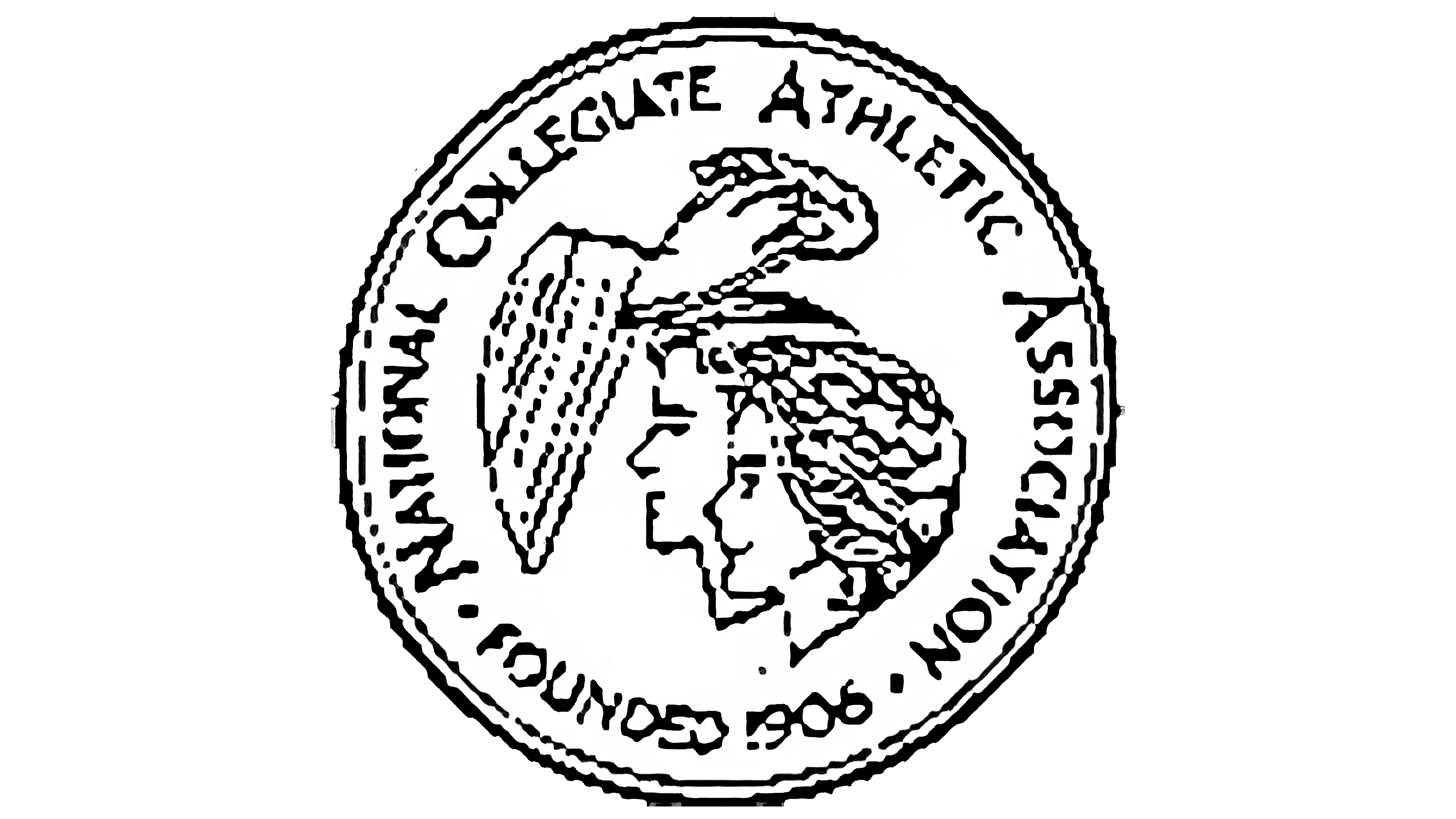
- Team Champion: Indiana (1st title)
- Edition: 11th
- Dates: June 10-11, 1932
- Host city: (Illinois) Chicago, Illinois; University of Chicago
- Venue: Stagg Field

The 1932 NCAA Track and Field Championships was the ninth NCAA track and field championship. The meet was held at Chicago, Illinois in June 1932.

== Team championship ==
1. Indiana - 56 points
2. Ohio State - 49 3/4 points
3. Minnesota - 31 1/2 points
4. Marquette - 23 3/4 points
5. Michigan - 23 points
6. Iowa - 19 points
7. Illinois - 18 1/2 points
8. Oklahoma - 17 points
9. Illinois State - 15 points
10. Georgia - 14 points
10. Kansas - 14 points

== Track events ==
100-yard dash
1. Ralph Metcalfe, Marquette - 9.5 seconds (equals world record)
2. Donald Bennett, Ohio St.
3. Jimmy Johnson, Illinois St. Normal
4. Hudson Hellmich, Illinois
5. Harold Thomton, Minnesota
6. Ralph Pierce, North Dakota

120-yard high hurdles
1. George Saling, Iowa - 14.1 seconds (new world record)
2. John Black, Ohio St.
3. Jack Keller, Ohio St.
4. Charles Scheifley, Minnesota
5. Edward Roden, Wisconsin
6. H. Hinckley Kansas St.

220-yard dash
1. Ralph Metcalfe, Marquette - 20.5 seconds (new world record)
2. Jimmy Johnson, Illinois St. Normal
3. Donald Bennett, Ohio St.
4. Harold Thomton, Minnesota
5. Peyton Glass, Oklahoma Aggies
6. Hudson Hellmich, Illinois

220-yard low hurdles
1. Jack Keller, Ohio St. - 22.7 seconds (new world record)
2. George Saling, Iowa
3. Charles Scheifley, Minnesota
4. C. Mears, Ohio Wesleyan
5. Charles Crouch, Indiana
6. Oliver Duggins, Northwestern

400-meter Hurdles
1. Eugene Beatty, Michigan Normal - 59.9 seconds
2. John Lewis, Detroit City College
3. Clyde Blanchard, Arizona
4. I. Thurston, Iowa
5. C. Mears, Ohio Wesleyan
6. G. Crank, Loyola of Chicago

440-yard dash
1. Alex Wilson, Notre Dame - 48.1 seconds
2. Ivan Fuqua, Indiana
3. R.A. Arnold, Michigan Normal
4. Edwin Russell, Michigan
5. Roger Keast, Michigan St.
6. R. Burns, Butler

880-yard run
1. Charles Hornbostel, Indiana - 1:52.7 (equals NCAA record)
IE Glenn Dawson, Oklahoma
IE E. Gray, Abilene Christian
2. Edwin Turner, Michigan
3. Adolph Schiller, Texas
4. D. Dunkin, Missouri
IE N. Rhodes, Kansas State Teachers (Emporia)
5. Earl Labertew, Iowa St.
6. Lyle Hutton, Illinois St. Normal

One-mile run
1. Glenn Cunningham, Kansas - 4:11.1 (new NCAA record)
2. Henry Brocksmith, Indiana
IE Russell Zaser, Butler
3. Larry Kenney, Purdue
IE D. Smith, Kansas State Teachers (Pittsburg)
4. John Simmons, Abilene Christian
5. Lyle Chapman, Iowa St.
6. Pearson, North Dakota

Two-mile run
1. Charles Shugert, Miami - 9:16.7 (new NCAA record)
2. Henry Brocksmith, Indiana
3. Cloyd Julian, DePaul
4. John Currell, Minnesota
5. Mike Pilbrow, Grinnell
6. William Hill, Michigan

== Field events ==
Broad jump
1. Lambert Redd, Bradley Tech - 25 feet, 6 3/8 inches
2. John Brooks, Chicago
3. Armin Dreusicke, Elmhurst
4. J. Morris, Oklahoma
5. Charles Crouch, Indiana
6. Rowens, Georgia

High jump
IE Willis Ward - 6 feet, 7 1/2 inches
1. Bert Nelson, Butler - 6 feet, 5 3/4 inches
2. Ted Shaw, Wisconsin
IE V. Murphy, Notre Dame
IE R. Schroeder, Kansas State Teachers (Pittsburg)
3. Howard Spencer, Geneva
3. William Newblock, Oklahoma
3. Worth Watkins, Abilene Christian
6. Ralston Russell, Ohio St.
6. D. Windau, Marquette
6. Robert Darling, Notre Dame
6. Nelson Schrier, Western Michigan

Hop, step and jump
1. Lambert Redd, Bradley Tech - 48 feet, 3 1/2 inches
2. Fred H. Meinert, De Paul
3. John Weatherly, Monmouth
4. J. Morris, Oklahoma
5. Portmess, De Paul
6. Charles Crouch, Indiana

Pole vault
1. Bryce Beecher, Indiana - 13 feet, 10 inches
IE Irving Seely, Illinois
2. Dick Schram, Marquette
2. Elton Hess, Minnesota
2. John Wonsowitz, Ohio St.
2. Don Zimmerman, Tulane
2. Jim McKinley, Michigan Normal
2. Ernest Lennignton, Illinois

Discus throw
1. Frank Purma, Illinois - 156 feet, 4 1/4 inches
2. Booker Brooks, Michigan
3. Graham Batchelor, Georgia
4. K. Thornhill, Kansas
5. N. Mountain, Penn College, Oskaloosa, Iowa
6. Alfred Howell, Oklahoma

Javelin
1. George Williams, Hampton Institute - 215 feet, 0 inches
IE Dwight Purvis, Purdue
2. Charles Sample, Arizona
3. Graham Batchelor, Georgia
4. Harold Smith, Ohio St.
5. Ben Marks, Oklahoma
6. Glenn Novotny, Wisconsin

Shot put
1. Hugh Rhea, Nebraska - 52 feet, 5 3/4 inches (new NCAA record)
2. Clarence Munn, Minnesota
3. Alfred Howell, Oklahoma
4. LeRoy Dues, Detroit City College
5. Fred Blanck, Drake
6. Graham Batchelor, Georgia

Hammer throw
1. Grant McDougall, Penn - 159 feet, 9 3/4 inches
2. Noble Biddinger, Indiana
3. Gantt Miller, West Virginia
4. Earl Johnson, Ohio St.
5. Roderick Cox, Michigan
6. William Youngerman, Iowa

== See also ==
- NCAA Men's Outdoor Track and Field Championship
