= Federico Gamboa (athlete) =

Mexican hurdler

Personal information
- Nationality: Mexican

Sport
- Sport: Track and field
- Event: 110 metres hurdles

Federico Gamboa was a Mexican hurdler. He competed in the men's 110 metres hurdles at the 1932 Summer Olympics.
