= George Golding =

Australian runner (1906–1999)

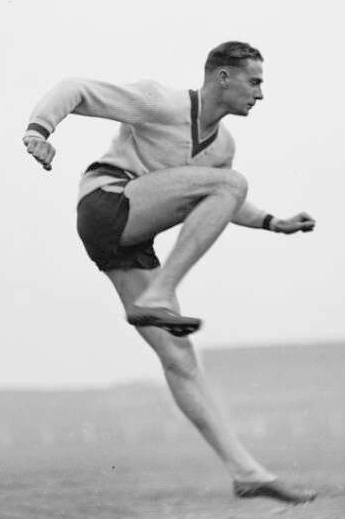
- Golding in the 1930s

Personal information
- Born: 6 May 1906 Forbes, New South Wales, Australia
- Died: 30 August 1999 (aged 93) Manly, New South Wales, Australia
- Height: 187 cm (6 ft 2 in)
- Weight: 80 kg (176 lb)

Sport
- Sport: Athletics
- Event(s): 400 m, 400 m hurdles
- Club: Club Randwick-Kensington, Sydney

Achievements and titles
- Personal best(s): 400 – 47.6y (1930); 400 mH – 53.1 (1932)
Medal record
Representing Australia
British Empire Games
Bronze medal – third place	1930 Hamilton	440 yards

George Augustus Golding (6 May 1906 – 30 August 1999) was an Australian runner who won a bronze medal in the 440 yd event at the 1930 British Empire Games. Together with his future wife Clare Dennis he competed in the 1932 Summer Olympics and placed sixth in the 400 metres; he was eliminated in the semi-finals in the 400 metre hurdles.
