= Ray Lewis (sprinter) =

Canadian sprinter

Medal record

Men's athletics

Representing Canada

Olympic Games
Bronze medal – third place	1932 Los Angeles	4x400 m relay

British Empire Games
Silver medal – second place	1934 London	4×440 yards

Raymond Gray Lewis, CM (October 8, 1910 – November 15, 2003) was a Canadian track and field athlete, and the first Canadian-born black Olympic medalist.

The descendant of African-American slaves, he was born and died in Hamilton, Ontario. Lewis was nicknamed Rapid Ray for his speed on the track. He excelled in the 100, 200, 400 and 800 metre distances in high school and captured seventeen national high school championships (including a record four in one day) while a student at Hamilton's Central Collegiate.

Lewis briefly attended Milwaukee's Marquette University on a scholarship, but returned to Canada after only a semester. He found a position on the Canadian Pacific Railway (CPR) as a porter during the Great Depression, a job he would hold for 22 years. Lewis continued training – often running alongside the CPR train tracks during stopovers on the Canadian Prairies – and won a bronze medal as part of the 4x400 metre relay team at the 1932 Summer Olympics in Los Angeles, California. In the 400 metre event he was eliminated in the quarter-finals.

Two years later he won a silver medal in the mile relay (4×440 yards) at the British Empire Games (later the Commonwealth Games). In the 440 yards competition he was eliminated in the semi-finals. Narrowly missing the cut for Canada's 1936 Olympic team, he ran for two more years before retiring after a bout of pain from shin splints (shin splints had caused Lewis problems in the latter portion of his running career). He received greater recognition later in his life, including the Order of Canada in 2001. In 2002, Canadian author John Cooper wrote his biography, Rapid Ray: The Story of Ray Lewis. The children's book chronicled his youth in Hamilton, as well as his training for the Olympics. A Hamilton Mountain school named in his honour, Ray Lewis Elementary, opened in 2005 and was occasionally visited by his widow Vivienne.
