= Giovanni Turba =

Italian sprinter (1905–1994)

Personal information
- Nationality: Italian
- Born: September 25, 1905 Milan, Italy
- Died: 11 June 1994 (aged 88) Perth, Western Australia
- Height: 1.78 m (5 ft 10 in)
- Weight: 78 kg (172 lb)

Sport
- Country: Italy
- Sport: Athletics
- Event: 400 metres
- Club: Pro Patria Milano

Achievements and titles
- Personal best: 400 m: 49.0 (1933)

Giovanni Turba (25 September 1905 – 11 June 1994) was an Italian sprinter who competed at the 1932 Summer Olympics.

== Olympic results ==
Year	Competition	Venue	Position	Event	Performance	Note
1932	Olympic Games	(United States) Los Angeles	6th	4x400 m relay	3:17.8	

== See also ==
- Italy national relay team
