= Mario De Negri =

Italian sprinter and hurdler (1901–1978)

Personal information
- Nationality: Italian
- Born: 27 November 1901 Chiavari, Italy
- Height: 1.73 m (5 ft 8 in)
- Weight: 73 kg (161 lb)

Sport
- Country: Italy
- Sport: Athletics
- Event: 400 metres
- Club: San Giorgio Genova

Achievements and titles
- Personal best: 400 m: 49.0 (1930)

Mario De Negri (27 November 1901 – 28 January 1978) was an Italian sprinter who competed at the 1932 Summer Olympics.

== Olympic results ==
Year	Competition	Venue	Position	Event	Performance	Note
1932	Olympic Games	(United States) Los Angeles	6th	4 × 400 m relay	3:17.8	

== See also ==
- Italy national relay team
