= Frank Conner (athlete) =

American hammer thrower

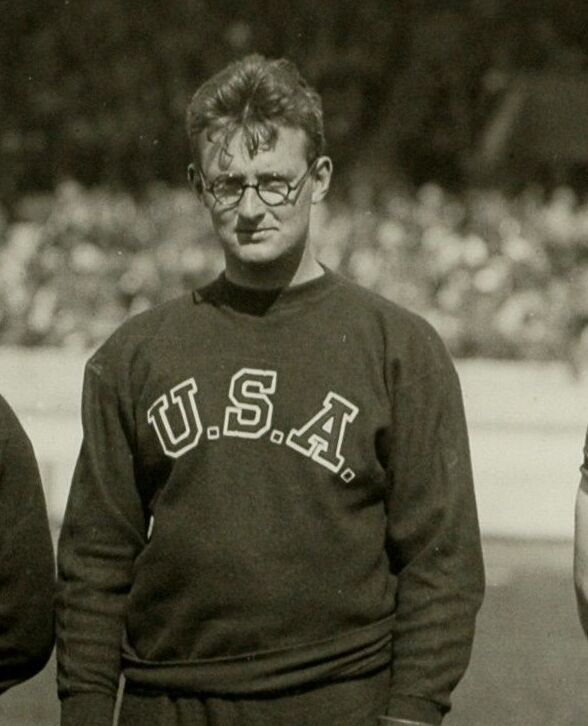
- Frank Conner in 1928

Personal information
- Born: October 6, 1908 Exeter, New Hampshire, United States
- Died: June 22, 1944 (aged 35) Stockton, California, United States

Sport
- Sport: Athletics
- Event: Hammer throw

Frank Norris Conner (October 6, 1908 – June 22, 1944) was an American hammer thrower who competed in the 1928 Summer Olympics and the 1932 Summer Olympics.

== Biography ==
Conner was born in Exeter, New Hampshire on October 6, 1908, and studied at The Hill School and Yale University. He qualified for the 1928 Summer Olympics in Berlin by placing fourth at the U.S. Olympic Trials, throwing 159 ft 6 7/8 in (48.63 m) to edge out former champion Matt McGrath for the last place on the American team. In the Olympic final he placed sixth with 46.75 m (153 ft 4 in).

Throwing for Yale, Conner was IC4A champion in 1930 with a throw of 177 ft 10 3/4 in (54.22 m), his personal best and the best mark in the world that year; he repeated as champion in 1931. He won the 1932 Olympic Trials with a best throw of 170 ft 10 3/4 in (52.09 m), but fouled on all three of his attempts at the Olympics, scoring no mark.

Conner later moved to Stockton, California, where he worked as a farmer. He died of chemical poisoning in 1944.
