= Eric Wennström =

Swedish hurdler

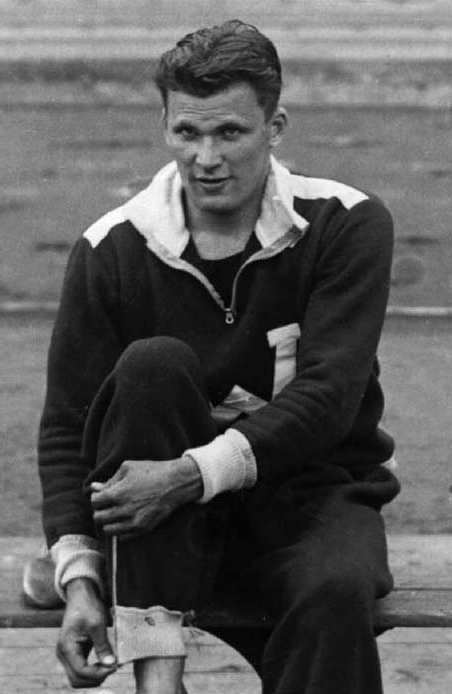

Personal information
- Born: 10 March 1909 Stockholm, Sweden
- Died: 8 October 1990 (aged 81) Stockholm, Sweden

Sport
- Sport: Athletics
- Event: Hurdles
- Club: Westermalms IF

Achievements and titles
- Personal best: 110 mH – 14.4 (1929)

Eric Verner Wennström (10 March 1909 – 8 October 1990) was a Swedish hurdler. He held the 110 m hurdles world record from 1929 to 1934 and competed in the 1928 Summer Olympics.

== Career ==
Wennström became an elite hurdler at a young age, challenging Sweden's established top hurdler Sten Pettersson and winning his first national title in 1927 as an 18-year-old. He represented Sweden at the 1928 Summer Olympics in Amsterdam and nearly qualified for the final, placing third in his semi-final.

Wennström reached his peak in 1929, consistently running under 15 seconds and winning another Swedish national title; finally on 25 August, in a dual meet against Norway at Stockholm, he broke the world record with his time of 14.4. Although a number of other athletes, starting with Earl Thomson in 1920, had run the slightly shorter 120 yd (109.7 m) hurdles in 14.4, Wennström was the first to do so over the metric distance. There were some doubts about the validity of Wennström's mark, with wind assistance and unreliable clocks cited as possible factors in it, but the International Amateur Athletic Federation, responsible for officially ratifying world records, found no problems with the time and accepted it.

Wennström lost his best shape after the 1929 season and never regained it, although he did become Swedish champion for a third and final time in 1931.

Records
Preceded by (South Africa) George Weightman-Smith	World record holder in men's 110 metres hurdles 25 August 1929 – 26 July 1934	Succeeded by (United States) Percy Beard
