= Antônio Giusfredi =

Brazilian hurdler

Personal information
- Born: 19 May 1908 São Paulo, Brazil
- Died: 10 March 1991 (aged 82)

Sport
- Sport: Track and field
- Event: 110 metres hurdles

Antônio Giusfredi (19 May 1908 – 10 March 1991) was a Brazilian hurdler. He competed in the men's 110 metres hurdles at the 1932 Summer Olympics.
