= John Cooper (author) =

Canadian author and corporate communications specialist

John Cooper (born 1958 in Toronto, Ontario) is a Canadian author and corporate communications specialist. Currently a manager for the Ontario Ministry of Transportation, Cooper is also a part-time teacher and freelance business writer. Cooper has also worked as a speechwriter, communications planner, media relations officer, correspondence manager, and publications editor. Cooper has written articles for different publications, including Maclean's magazine, CMA Management, the Toronto Star, and is a former employee of the Liberal newspaper in Richmond Hill, Ontario. Cooper teaches at Centennial College's Corporate Communications and Public Relations program. He currently lives in Whitby, Ontario, where he operates an independent writing and communications firm, Tymelco Communications, doing consulting work for a variety of clients.

== Written work ==
Besides writing articles, Cooper has written several non-fiction books, a novel and one textbook. Stemming from his interest in African-Canadian history, Cooper has written two biographies, one history book for a younger audience, and co-wrote an autobiography. In 1998, he assisted Stanley G. Grizzle with his autobiography My Name's Not George: The Story of the Brotherhood of Sleeping Car Porters in Canada. Following this, he wrote two books based on the life of African-Canadian Olympian Ray Lewis: Shadow Running, aimed at adult audiences and chronicling Lewis' trials as a railway porter, and Rapid Ray: The Story of Ray Lewis, which detailed Lewis' lifelong battles with discrimination and racism, and aimed at a younger preteen audience. In 2005, Cooper wrote Season of Rage: Hugh Burnett and the Struggle for Civil Rights. The young readers' history book examined the reality of racial intolerance in southern Ontario, as well as the efforts and input of many civil rights activists. Cooper wrote a textbook on crisis communications, Crisis Communications in Canada: A Practical Approach. The book uses several real and hypothetical case studies to show college communications students how to handle crisis situations (i.e. with the media, public relations, etc.). His first novel for young adults is entitled The Greyhound.

== Recognition ==
Season of Rage: 2006 selection of the Canadian Children’s Book Centre; 2007 nominee, Red Maple Award, Ontario Library Association; 2008 nominee, Stellar Book Awards.

Rapid Ray: The Story of Ray Lewis: 2004 selection of the Golden Oak Adult Literacy Book Club; 2004 Our Choice starred selection of the Canadian Children’s Book Centre.

== Reading ==
- My Name's Not George, with Stanley G. Grizzle, Umbrella Press, 1998.
- Shadow Running, Umbrella Press, 1999.
- Rapid Ray: The Story of Ray Lewis, Tundra Books, 2002.
- Season of Rage, Tundra Books, 2005.
- Crisis Communications In Canada: A Practical Approach, Centennial College Press, 2007.
- The Greyhound, Dundurn Press, 2011.
- Everything Runs Like a Movie, Dundurn Press, 2013.
