= Bengt Sjöstedt =

Finnish hurdler (1906–1981)

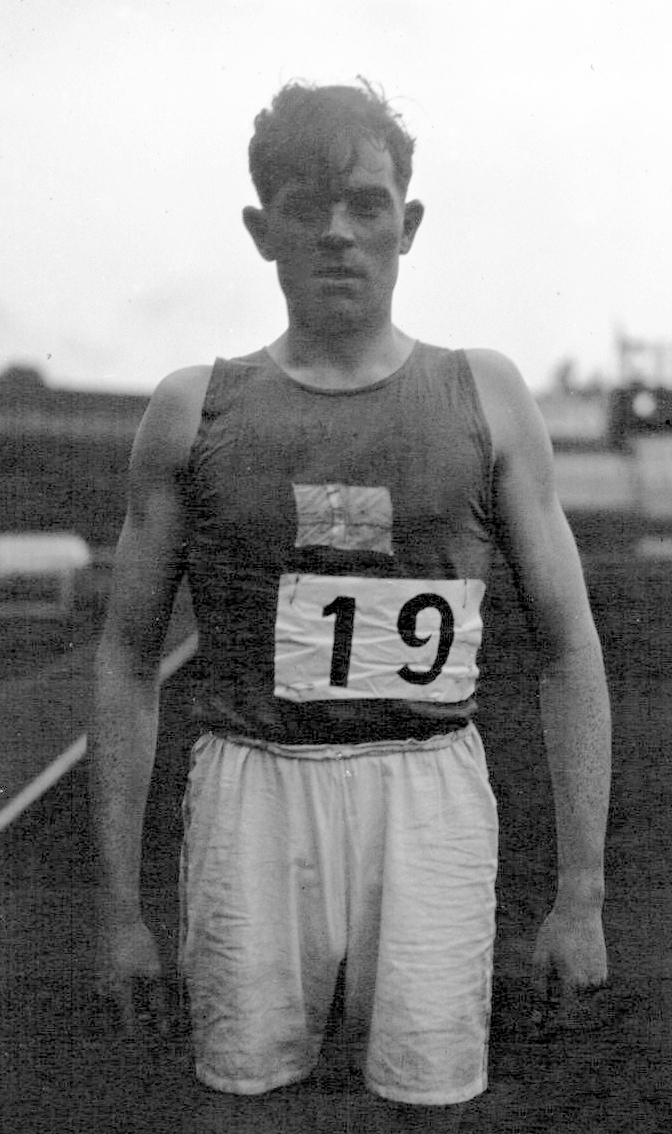
- Sjöstedt in 1932

Personal information
- Born: 2 November 1906 Tenala, Finland
- Died: 16 July 1981 (aged 74) Porvoon maalaiskunta, Finland
- Height: 182 cm (6 ft 0 in)
- Weight: 73 kg (161 lb)

Sport
- Sport: Athletics
- Event: Hurdles
- Club: HIFK, Helsinki

Achievements and titles
- Personal best: 110 mH – 14.4 (1931)

Bengt Olof Albert "Benkku" Sjöstedt (2 November 1906 – 16 July 1981) was a Finnish hurdler. He equalled the world record for 110 m hurdles in 1931 and competed at the 1928 and 1932 Summer Olympics.

== Career ==
Sjöstedt was Finland's first international-level 110 m hurdler. He had a habit of toppling one or two hurdles in most races, which cost him several Finnish records; the rules at the time stated a time was invalid for record purposes if any hurdles were knocked down, although disqualification from the race itself wouldn't result unless three or more hurdles were knocked down.

In 1926 Sjöstedt placed a close second to Erik Wilén at the Finnish championships; later that year he beat Wilén in a time of 15.3, under Wilén's Finnish record of 15.5, but he knocked down hurdles and thus missed out on a new record. In 1927 he won his first national title and placed a close third behind two Swedes, Sten Pettersson and Carl-Axel Christiernsson, at the Finland-Sweden Athletics International; the Swedes were both Olympic finalists from 1924. Sjöstedt's time in that race was 15.0, but again the knock-down rule cost him the Finnish record.

Sjöstedt ran a wind-aided 14.9 at the Finnish tryouts for the 1928 Summer Olympics in Amsterdam and was accordingly selected. At the Olympics he ran 15.0 in his heat and 15.1 in his semi-final; he failed to qualify for the final. Later that year he ran 15.4 in Tampere without knocking down a hurdle, his first official Finnish record.

Sjöstedt stayed in consistent form in 1929 and 1930 before reaching his peak in 1931. He ran 14.6 without toppling hurdles twice that summer, but at the Finland-Sweden International he knocked down three hurdles and was disqualified, leaving the victory for Pettersson. He defeated Pettersson by more than three metres in a rematch at Helsinki on 5 September, equalling the world record with his time of 14.4.

At the 1932 Summer Olympics in Los Angeles Sjöstedt again failed to make the final, placing second in his heat with a time of 14.9 and fifth in his semi-final. He was no longer in his 1931 shape, lacked the consistency of the winning Americans and suffered from sciatica at the Olympics.

Sjöstedt stayed in good shape for several more years after Los Angeles, running 14.6 to defeat Germany's Erwin Wegner and Willi Welscher in a dual meet in 1935. His 1931 time of 14.4 remained the world record until 1934 and the Finnish national record until 1967, when Matti Harri and Antti Lanamäki both ran 14.3. Sjöstedt is the only Finn to have held a world record in a hurdling event.
