= Roland Harper (athlete) =

British hurdler

Personal information
- Nationality: British (English)
- Born: 23 April 1907 Reigate, England
- Died: 24 April 1989 (aged 82) Tunbridge Wells, England

Sport
- Sport: Track and field
- Event: 110 metres hurdles
- Club: University of Oxford AC; Achilles Club

Roland St. George Tristram Harper (23 April 1907 – 24 April 1989) was a British hurdler who competed at the 1932 Summer Olympics.

== Biography ==
Harper was educated at Charterhouse School and Lincoln College, Oxford.

Harper represented England at the 1930 British Empire Games, competing in the 120 yards hurdles. He was an accountant at the time of the 1930 Games.

At the 1932 Olympic Games, he competed in the men's 110 metres hurdles.

Harper finished second behind Don Finlay in the 120 yards hurdles event at the 1933 AAA Championships.

Harper worked at Manchester University as a physical education educator. He became an AAA hurdling instructor at Loughborough in 1935. Harper served with the Royal Artillery during World War II and was also president of the Northern Counties AA and treasurer of the Achilles Club.
