= Jack Keller (hurdler) =

American hurdler

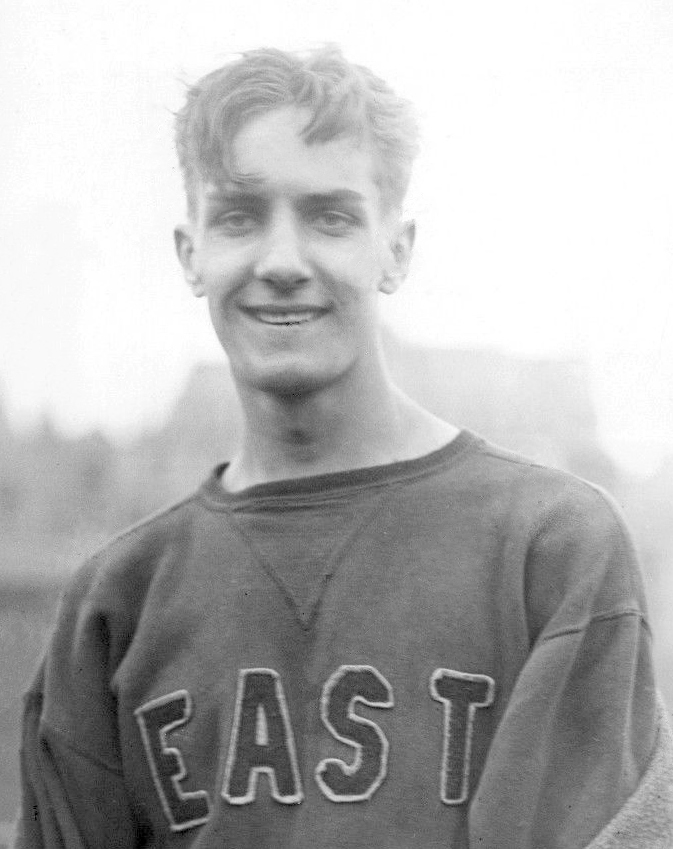
- Keller in 1929

Personal information
- Born: October 23, 1911
- Died: June 3, 1978 (aged 66) Columbus, Ohio, U.S.
- Height: 193 cm (6 ft 4 in)
- Weight: 77 kg (170 lb)

Sport
- Sport: Athletics
- Event: Hurdles
- Club: Ohio State Buckeyes

Achievements and titles
- Personal best: 120 ydH – 14.1 (1933)

John Alton Claude Keller (October 23, 1911 – June 3, 1978) was an American hurdler who set world records in 120 -yard/110-meter and 220-yard events. He won the 110 m hurdles at the 1932 United States Olympic Trials, but narrowly missed out on a medal at the Olympics, placing a close fourth.

== Hurdling career ==
Jack Keller studied at Ohio State University and succeeded sprinter George Simpson as the Ohio State Buckeyes' leading track and field star. As a sophomore in 1931, he won the 220-yard hurdles in 23.5 at the Big Ten conference meet; he was favored in the 120-yard hurdles as well, but was narrowly defeated by Illinois's Lee Sentman in a world-record-equaling 14.4. (Note: Keller himself had run 14.3 several weeks earlier at the Ohio Relays. However, that time wasn't ratifiable as a world record as he had knocked down two hurdles. Although modern rules do not prohibit the toppling of hurdles, those valid in 1931 specified that knocking down any hurdles would make a mark invalid for record purposes and that knocking down three or more hurdles would lead to disqualification.) He then led Ohio State to a second-place finish in the NCAA Championships, winning both the 120-yard hurdles (14.6) and the 220-yard hurdles (23.8) in difficult conditions and tying for the highest points scorer of the meet.

Keller improved in 1932 and won that year's Big Ten 120-yard title in a world-record-breaking 14.0, defeating Iowa's new star George Saling. However, due to wind assistance, this time could not be ratified as a record. Keller and Saling then split the two races at the NCAA Championships on June 11, both running under the respective world records: Saling won the 120-yard hurdles in 14.1 as Keller placed third, while Keller defended his title in the longer race, beating Saling by a step in 22.7 to break Charles Brookins's world record of 23.0. However, neither time was ratified as a world record.

At the Olympic Trials on July 16, Keller again came out on top in the 110-meter hurdles, running 14.4 into a headwind to defeat Saling and the previous year's national champion, Percy Beard. His winning time equaled the world record for the metric hurdles; automatically timed as 14.53, it was the first hurdling record to have been automatically timed. The three Americans were clear favorites for the Olympics and were expected to sweep the medals.

At the Olympics in Los Angeles, Keller easily advanced from the first two rounds, winning his heat in 14.9 and the first semi-final in 14.5, an Olympic record. However, that record only lasted for a few minutes, as the other semi-final was won by Saling in 14.4. In the final, Keller led for the first four hurdles, but hit the fifth hurdle and was caught first by Beard and then the eventual winner, Saling. He was initially thought to have come in third and was presented with the Bronze Medal; however, after review of the Kirby Two-Eyed Camera films, officials determined that Britain's Don Finlay was the bronze medalist, and they asked Keller to give the medal to Finlay.

Saling died in a car accident in April 1933, leaving Keller on top. After watching Keller win the 120-yard hurdles at the 1933 Penn Relays in 14.3, 1920 Olympic champion and former world record holder Earl Thomson called him the "world's greatest hurdler," saying Keller was easily better than he had been. Keller won that year's Big Ten championships in 14.1 (a world record) and 23.5. However, at the NCAA Championships, he fell in his heat in the 120-yard hurdles and failed to qualify for the final; the knee gashes he suffered in that fall also spoiled his performance in the 220-yard hurdles.

Keller retired from hurdling after the 1933 season and became the managing editor of the Columbus, Ohio Citizen Journal. He attempted a brief comeback in 1936.
