= Renaldo Nehemiah =

American football player and hurdler

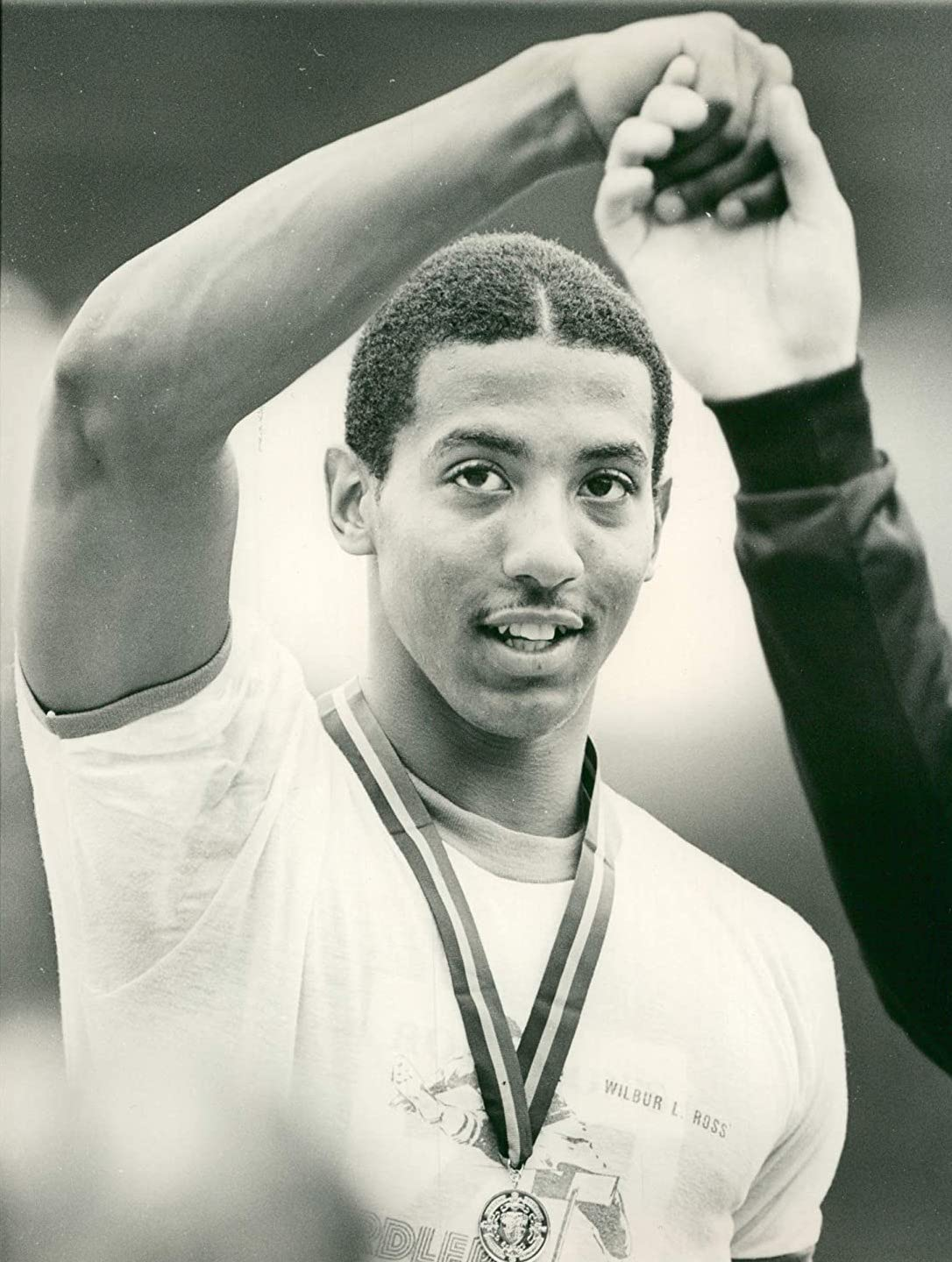
- Nehemiah in 1981

Personal information
- Born: March 24, 1959 (age 67) Newark, New Jersey, U.S.
- Football career

No. 83
- Position: Wide receiver

Personal information
- Listed height: 6 ft 1 in (1.85 m)
- Listed weight: 181 lb (82 kg)

Career information
- High school: Scotch Plains (NJ) Fanwood
- College: Maryland
- NFL draft: 1982: undrafted

Career history
- San Francisco 49ers (1982–1984)

Awards and highlights
- Super Bowl champion (XIX)

Career NFL statistics
- Games played: 40
- Receptions: 43
- Receiving yards: 754
- Receiving touchdowns: 4
- Stats at Pro Football Reference

Sport
- Sport: Athletics
- Events: Sprint, hurdles

Achievements and titles
- Personal bests: 100 m – 10.24 (1979); 200 m – 20.37 (1979); 110 mH – 12.93 (1981)
Medal record
Representing the United States
Pan American Games
Gold medal – first place	1979 San Juan	110 m hurdles
IAAF World Cup
Gold medal – first place	1979 Montreal	110 m hurdles

Renaldo Nehemiah (born March 24, 1959) is a retired American track and field athlete who specialized in the 110 m hurdles. He was ranked number one in the world for four straight years, and is a former world record holder. Nehemiah is the first man to run the event in under 13 seconds. Nehemiah also played pro football in the National Football League (NFL) as a wide receiver for the San Francisco 49ers from 1982 to 1985, before returning to track and field athletics from 1986 to 1991. After retiring from competition, he has worked in sports management.

== Track and field career ==
Nehemiah was nicknamed "Skeets" as a baby because he crawled along the floor so fast. The nickname followed him. He was the national junior champion in 1977, the same year he graduated from Scotch Plains-Fanwood High School in his hometown of Scotch Plains, New Jersey. Nehemiah's high school personal bests were 12.9 in the 110 meter hurdles and 35.8 in the 300 meter hurdles, so much faster than his competitors that his coach had him compete over 39 inch hurdles (collegiate height) and occasionally train over 42 inch hurdles. He was Track and Field News "High School Athlete of the Year" in 1977. The cover was noted for showing Nehemiah in a reflective mood rather than in action as most other T&FN covers. "I always look spaced out at meets, sort of nonchalant," Nehemiah told The New York Times in response. After graduating from Scotch Plains-Fanwood, Nehemiah attended the University of Maryland, where he won three NCAA titles including the 1978-9 NCAA Indoor Championships.

Nehemiah's sophomore year at Maryland proved to be his breakout year. He broke the world record in the 110 meter hurdles twice in two weeks, running 13.16 and then 13.00. He won the 1979 IAAF World Cup and Pan-American Games titles, as well as the second of four U.S. national titles. At the 1979 Penn Relays, Nehemiah anchored UMD's shuttle hurdle relay, 4 × 400 meter relay, and 4 × 200 meter relay, and was named meet MVP. During the relays he recorded an unofficial split of 19.4 seconds in the 4-by-200 meter relay and a 44.3 second split in the 4 × 400 meter relay. Nehemiah described his 400-meter leg as follows:

So, I just ran harder and harder as the noise [of the crowd] got louder. And before I knew it, I could see (Villanova's) Tim Dale and the finish line about 20 meters in front of me. As I was really starting to be overwhelmed by the pain, I dug one more time with all I had, and surged past a fading Dale and believe I won by a couple of meters. [Afterwards] ... I told myself that I would not ever feel that type of pain again in my life. And I never ran another 400-meter again.

— Renaldo Nehemiah

The prohibitive favorite to win the 110-meter hurdles in the 1980 Summer Olympics, he was unable to compete due to a 65-nation boycott of the Games. Nehemiah received one of 461 Congressional Gold Medals created for the athletes. At the 1981 Weltklasse meeting in Zürich, Switzerland, Nehemiah broke the world record for the 110 meter hurdles and became the first person to ever run the race in less than 13 seconds. In an interview, Nehemiah explained his race as less than ideal:

I was way out of control over the first hurdle. Then I floated over the second hurdle, and Greg [Foster] caught me going into the third hurdle. From there, I just ran as fast as I could. It was just one of those things where I was just determined to win. I knew that if I could stay out in front, I could make him make a mistake. He's six-foot-three, so if I'm getting crowded between hurdles, I know he's getting crowded trying to chase me. For the first three hurdles I had too much adrenaline; I couldn't control it, so I had to slow myself down. I knew that, technically, I was a better hurdler, faster between and over the hurdles. That's probably what got me ahead of him. It's a different race when you're chasing someone than when you're being chased.

— Renaldo Nehemiah

World Records
No.	Event	Time	Date	Year	Place
1.	50 m H	6.36	Feb 3	1979	Edmonton
2.	55 m H	6.89	Jan 20	1979	New York
3.	110 m H	13.16	Apr 14	1979	San Jose
4.	110 m H	13.00	May 6	1979	Westwood
5.	50 yd H	5.98	Feb 13	1981	Toronto
6.	110 m H	12.93	Aug 19	1981	Zurich
7.	50 yd H	5.92	Jan 29	1982	Toronto
8.	60 yd H	6.82	Jan 30	1982	Dallas

Pat Connolly, who also coached sprinter Evelyn Ashford, was instrumental in reviving Nehemiah's track career after his short foray in football. Connolly is quoted as saying:

If he had concentrated on athletics he would have matched Harrison Dillard's achievement (double gold in the 100m and 110m hurdles). He clearly could have run under 9.9 in the 100.

— Pat Connolly

She also believed he may have been better suited for the 400 m hurdle event. She is on record as saying:

Based on a 300m I timed in practice, I believe he would still hold the world record in that event (400m hurdles), had he given it a serious try.

— Pat Connolly

Nehemiah won the British AAA Championships title in the 100 metres hurdles event at the 1981 AAA Championships.

=== Track records ===
As of 15 September 2024, Nehemiah holds the following track records for 110 metres hurdles.

Location	Time	Windspeed m/s	Date	Notes
Bern	13.20	+ 1.3	29/08/1979	
Champaign, IL.	12.91	+ 3.5	01/06/1979	
Düsseldorf	13.40	+ 0.2	06/07/1978	
Koblenz	13.04	0.0	26/08/1981	
San Juan	13.20	+ 2.0	11/07/1979	
Syracuse	13.00	+ 3.5	26/07/1981	
Västerås	13.40	+ 0.5	26/06/1979	
Viareggio	13.31	– 0.4	05/08/1981	
Walnut, CA.	13.19	+ 1.5	16/06/1979	
Westwood, CA.	13.00	+ 0.9	06/05/1979	This was the world record for two years.

== Football career ==
Despite never playing football in college, Nehemiah worked out in 1982 for several NFL teams, including the San Francisco 49ers, Pittsburgh Steelers, Washington Redskins, Dallas Cowboys, Philadelphia Eagles, New York Giants and New England Patriots; he signed with the 49ers. During his three years as a wide receiver he caught 43 passes for 754 yards, a 17.5 average, and four touchdowns. Nehemiah was deemed expendable in 1985 when the 49ers drafted Jerry Rice in the first round, and he returned to the track in 1986.

== The Superstars ==
Nehemiah was the only four-time winner of The Superstars, a made-for-television decathlon-style competition broadcast by ABC Sports (and during the late 1980s, NBC Sports). He won the event in 1981, 1982, 1983 and 1986.

== Management ==
He is currently involved with Athletics Managers, a sports management and marketing agency. Clients he has represented have included Allen Johnson, Mark Crear, Justin Gatlin, Sha'Carri Richardson and 2012 400 meter Olympic Gold Medalist Kirani James.

Records
Preceded by (Cuba) Alejandro Casañas	Men's 110m Hurdles World Record Holder; April 14, 1979 – August 16, 1989	Succeeded by (United States) Roger Kingdom
Awards
Preceded by Phil Ford	ACC Athlete of the Year; 1979	Succeeded by Julie Shea
Preceded by Dwayne Evans	Track & Field News High School Boys Athlete of the Year; 1977	Succeeded by Sanya Owolabi
Achievements
Preceded by (United States) Greg Foster	Men's 110m Hurdles Best Year Performance; 1979–1981	Succeeded by (United States) Greg Foster
