= James Gordon (sprinter) =

American sprinter

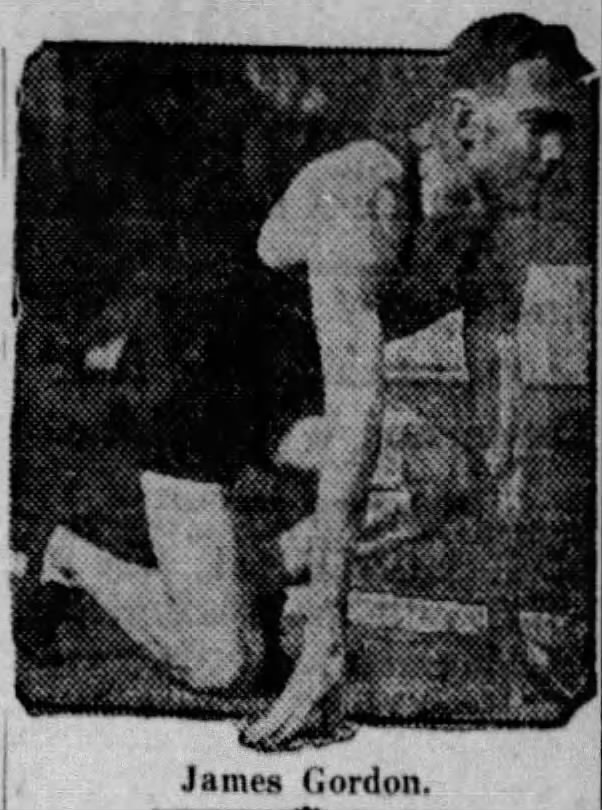

Personal information
- Born: December 27, 1908 Barberton, Ohio, United States
- Died: May 26, 1997 (aged 88) Mount Airy, Ohio, United States

Sport
- Sport: Sprinting
- Event: 400 metres

James "Jimmie" Gordon (December 27, 1908 – May 26, 1997) was an American sprinter. He competed in the men's 400 metres at the 1932 Summer Olympics.

Gordon was from Cleveland, Ohio and competed for the Miami RedHawks track and field begging in the 1928-29 school year. He set a personal best 48.3 seconds over 440 yards in 1991. For his first three years of collegiate competition, he was undefeated in the 440 yards. He achieved All-American honors at the 1931 NCAA Track and Field Championships, placing runner-up in the 440 yards.

Gordon also played for the Miami RedHawks football team. He later coached for the Lehigh Mountain Hawks track and field team and for his alma mater.
