= Iwao Masuda =

Japanese sprinter (born 1914)

Personal information
- Nationality: Japanese
- Born: 25 December 1914 Shizuoka, Japan

Sport
- Sport: Sprinting
- Event: 400 metres

Iwao Masuda (増田 礒, Masuda Iwao; born 25 December 1914, date of death unknown) was a Japanese sprinter. He competed in the men's 400 metres at the 1932 Summer Olympics.
