= Felix Rinner =

Austrian sprinter and Nazi officer (1911–1976)

Personal information
- Nationality: Austrian
- Born: 6 January 1911
- Died: 2 April 1976 (aged 65)

Sport
- Sport: Sprinting
- Event: 200 metres

Felix Rinner (6 January 1911 – 2 April 1976) was an Austrian sprinter and an officer of the Austrian SS.

== Biography ==
Rinner finished third behind Godfrey Rampling in the 440 yards event at the 1931 AAA Championships.

Rinner competed in the men's 200 metres at the 1936 Summer Olympics. Rinner was a ten time national champion across four different sprint events in the 1930s.

When Austria was annexed by Germany, on March 11, 1938, he led a command of 40 armed SS men who forced their way in and occupied the Austrian Federal Chancellery.

In 1941 Rinner was a member of the Austrian SS (Obersturmbannführer) to the SS Panzergrenadier Division “Viking”, was Adjutant to SS leader Ernst Kaltenbrunner (1903-1946, executed by hanging in Berlin for being a major perpetrator of the Holocaust), the commander of the entire Austrian SS, and was involved in the organization of the Gestapo in Austria. From 1945 to 1947 Rinner was interned by the Americans.
