= Ben Eastman =

American middle-distance runner

Olympic medal record

Men's athletics

Representing the USA
Silver medal – second place	1932 Los Angeles	400 metres

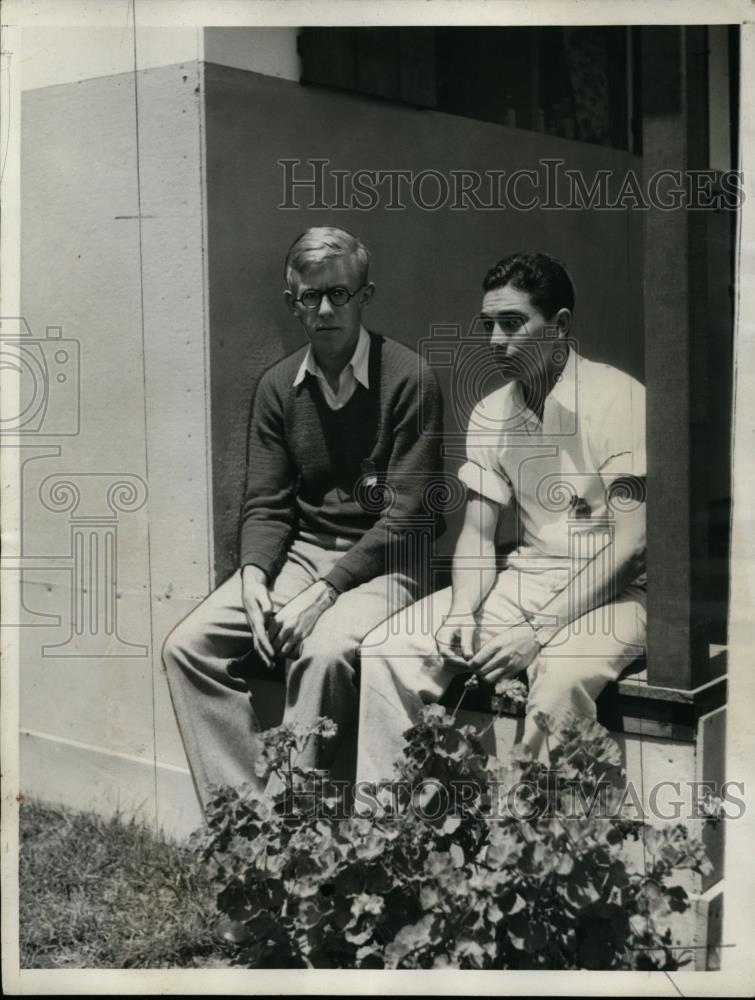
Ben Eastman, left, and Bill Carr at the Olympic Village in 1932

Benjamin Bangs Eastman (July 19, 1911 – October 6, 2002), alias "Blazin' Ben", was an American middle distance runner. He was born in Burlingame, California, and graduated from Stanford University in 1933.

He competed for the United States in the 1932 Summer Olympics held in Los Angeles, United States in the 400 metres where he won the silver medal. He was the U.S. national 800 metres champion in 1934.

Eastman, one of three Americans to hold the world record in both the 400 and 800 meters, was voted into the Track and Field Hall of Fame in 2006. He died in Hotchkiss, Colorado, aged 91.

Records
Preceded by (United States) Emerson Spencer	Men's 400 metres World Record Holder; 1932-03-26 – 1932-08-05	Succeeded by (United States) Bill Carr
Preceded by (United Kingdom) Tommy Hampson	Men's 800 metres World Record Holder equalled the 1:49.8 by Tommy Hampson; 1934-06-16 – 1936-08-20	Succeeded by (United States) Glenn Cunningham
