= Bunoo Sutton =

Indian sprinter

Personal information
- Full name: Mervyn Ernest Sutton
- Nationality: Indian
- Born: 2 June 1909 Jubbulpore, British India
- Died: 20 December 1956 (aged 47)

Sport
- Sport: Sprinting
- Event: 100 metres

Mervyn Ernest "Bunoo" Sutton (2 June 1909 – 20 December 1956) was an Indian sprinter. He competed in the men's 100 metres at the 1932 Summer Olympics.
