= Paul de Bruyn =

German runner (1907–1997)

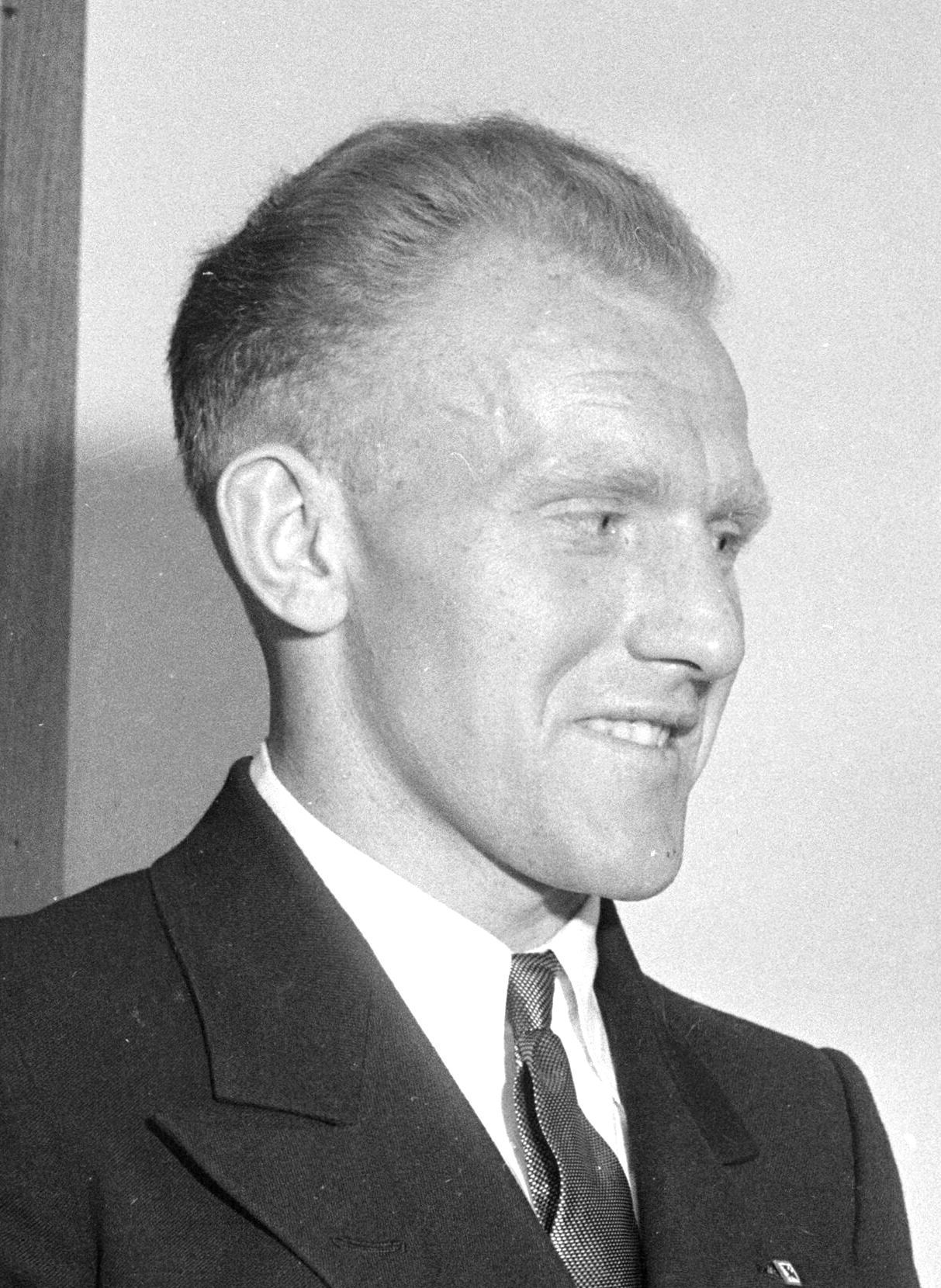
De Bruyn in 1936

Paul de Bruyn (October 7, 1907 – April 5, 1997) was a German athlete.

Born in Weserdeich (Berne, Germany) he became a Navy sailor and settled in New York City, where he started long distance running. He became the first runner from outside North America to win the Boston Marathon in 1932. De Bruyn defeated defending champion Jimmy Henigan in 2:33:36, pulling ahead through the final two miles of the race and winning with a margin of 56 seconds.

De Bruyn went on to participate in the marathons of the 1932 and the 1936 Summer Olympics. He finished 15th in 1932 and gave up at km 35 in 1936. Not fitting into the training regimen of German athletics he returned to the United States, quit road racing, married and became a U.S. citizen. As volunteer at the Navy in World War II, he was severely injured by an exploding ship's propeller in October 1945.

After the war he worked as engineer in New York City. In 1967 he retired and moved to Florida, where he kept himself fit by long hiking tours and swimming. He became an honorary member of the Daytona Beach Track Club and was subsequently commemorated by the Paul deBruyn Memorial 30K road race, which is held annually in New Smyrna Beach, Florida. One year after he was invited to the 100th edition of the Boston Marathon, he died in Daytona Beach, Florida.
