= Bill Carr =

American sprinter (1909–1966)

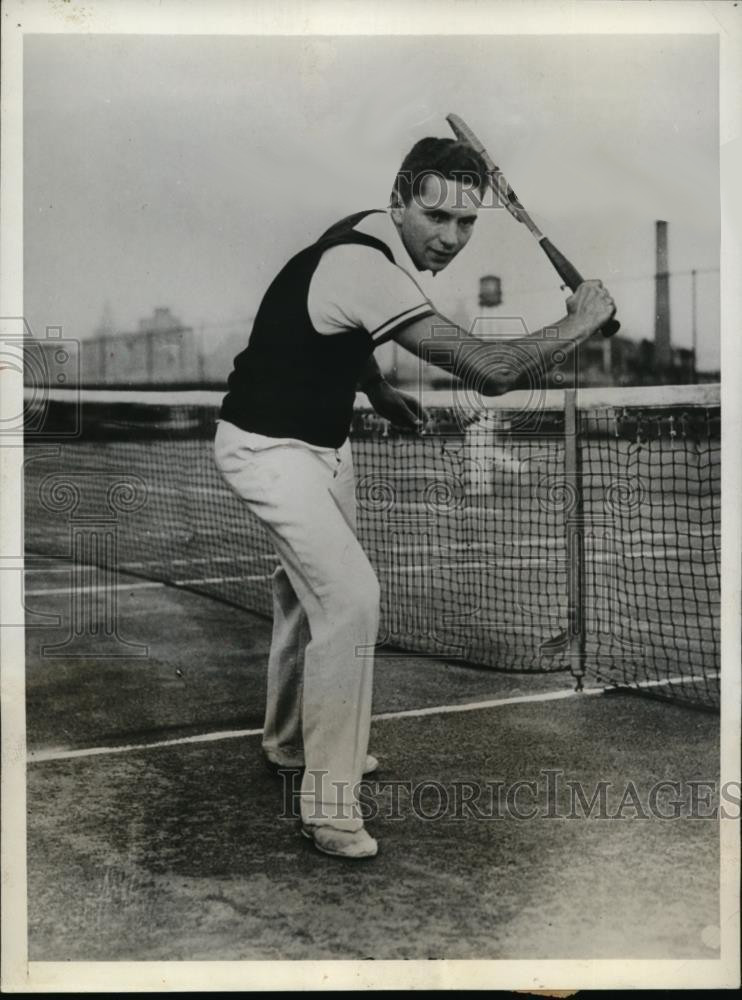
- Carr playing tennis, 1932

Personal information
- Full name: William Arthur Carr
- National team: United States
- Born: October 24, 1909 Pine Bluff, Arkansas, U.S.
- Died: January 14, 1966 (aged 56) Tokyo, Japan
- Education: University of Pennsylvania
- Occupation: corporate executive
- Employer: Prismo Safety Products

Sport
- Sport: outdoor track and field
- University team: Penn Quakers
Medal record
Men's athletics
Representing the United States
Olympic Games
Gold medal – first place	1932 Los Angeles	400 metres
Gold medal – first place	1932 Los Angeles	4 × 400 m relay

William Arthur Carr (October 24, 1909 – January 14, 1966) was an American athlete and double Olympic champion in 1932. Called the "Arkansas flyer," Carr never lost a race during his college and Olympic career.

== Early life and education ==
Carr was born and raised in Pine Bluff, Arkansas. His parents were Ann Holmes and William L. Carr, a traveling salesman with the Mann-Tankersley Drug Co. He received his elementary school education at Lakeside School in Pine Bluff.

He attended Pine Bluff High School in 1925. In his freshman year, he joined the track team because he was too small for basketball or football. He demonstrated skill at jumping, but he broke both ankles leaping over a bar and had resign late in the season.

Carr was recruited back to the high school track team in 1927. He received national attention at the spring state meet in Arkandelphia for his record–making high jump of 6.75 feet and a long jump of 21 feet 4 inches. In addition to winning those two events, he came in second at the 100-yard sprint and 220-yard sprint. In a prior track meet, he had already matched the Arkansas record in the 100-yard event. As a result, national sports writers were calling him the top high school track star in the United States.

A local banker convinced Carr to enroll in the Mercersburg Academy in Mercersburg, Pennsylvania for 1928 in preparation for an Ivy League college. There, he was coached by Jimmy Curran. While he was at Mercersburg, they won the annual inter-scholastic track meet to become state champions. Carr was the Pennsylvania champion in the 100-meter sprint, the 200-meter sprint, and the long jump, setting a state record for the latter. He graduated from Mercersburg in the spring of 1929.

Carr was recruited by the University of Pennsylvania and started there in 1929. He was on the track team and served as its co-captain. At Penn, he was a member of the Fraternity of Delta Psi (St. Anthony Hall) and a member of the Sphinx Senior Society. He was president of the sophomore class and received the Golden Spoon as the "most outstanding, all-around student." For three years, he received the Varsity Club scholarship "for scholastic excellence, character and athletic ability." He graduated from the Wharton School of the University of Pennsylvania in 1933 with a B.S. in economics.

== Track and field ==
At the University of Pennsylvania, Carr was coached by 1904 Olympian Lawson Robertson who called him "the fastest Carr in America." In college, he never lost the 400-meter sprint. He also anchored the 1,600-meter relay team—which also never lost a competition during his college years. His favorite events became the long jump, the 440-yard, and the 880-yard.

He was the 1931 Amateur Athletic Union Indoor national champion in the 300-yards event. At the 1932 Intercollegiate Championships (IC4A) championships in Berkeley California, Carr beat world-record holder Ben Eastman in the 440-yard dash, winning the IC4A 440-yard title for 1932. His time was 47.0 seconds; Eastman's record was 46.4 seconds. Carr was ranked number one in the world at the 400-meters.at the end of the 1932 season.

Several weeks later in Palo Alto, California, Carr again outran Eastman at the 1932 USA Outdoor Championships and 1932 United States Olympic trials (track and field). In addition to making the United States Olympic team, Carr was also a favorite for the 400-meter gold medal at the 1932 Summer Olympics in Los Angeles, California.

On August 4, 1932 in Los Angeles Olympics, Carr placed first in his semi-final 400-meter heat with a time of 47.2 seconds, breaking Eric Liddell’s world record time of 47.6 seconds from the 1924 Summer Olympics. However, Eastman matched Liddell’s record in his semi-final heat, setting up a final Olympic race that The New York Times called the “400-meter race of the century." In the final, Eastman led during most of the race, but Carr emerged victorious in the last 100-meters with a time of 46.2 seconds. He had not only won a gold medal, but he also had set a world record. A few days later, Carr won another gold medal as the anchor of America's 4 × 400-meter relay team. Although not scheduled to complete, he substituted for Arnold Adams who had to withdraw due to an injury. They set a new world record of 3:08.2.

Back at college in 1933, Carr had a "lackluster" performance in the spring season. On January 25, 1933, he announced that he would retire from track after the 1933 season. He said, "I expect to be a member of the United States track and field team that will tour Europe next summer. When the team returns, my uniform and spiked shoes will be put away for good." He planned on retiring so that he could focus on a new career in business.

=== World Records ===
Event	Time	Date	Competition	Record held through	Reference
400-meter	46.20	August 5, 1932	1932 Summer Olympics	1948 (tied)	
1600-meter relay	3.08.20	August 7, 1932	1932 Summer Olympics		

== Honors ==
- In 2008, Carr was inducted into the National Track and Field Hall of Fame.
- Carr was inducted into the Arkansas Sports Hall of Fame in 1962.
- Carr was selected for the Sports Illustrated's All-Time Olympic Team in 1954.
- He was selected as the number one 400-meter runner for 1925-49 by Track & Field News' World Athletes of the Century.
- The Bill Carr Memorial Room at the Pine Bluff Public Library is named in his honor.
- A statue of Carr was installed at Franklin Field of the University of Pennsylvania.
- A statue was dedicated in his honor at Mercersburg Preparatory Academy.
- In 1932, he received a special trophy from his hometown of Pine Bluff, Arkansas.

== Later life ==
On March 18, 1933, Carr was in a car accident that broke both his ankles and his right pelvis. At the time of the two-car accident, he was standing on the car's running board. He was in the hospital for four week and was not able to compete in track again. He had a slight limp as a result of his injuries.

In 1934, Carr started working for the Insurance Company of North America. During World War II, he joined the U.S. Navy, serving as an officer in naval intelligence the Pacific Theater. While there, he met his wife, Rachel Elizabeth Manasseh, in Shanghai, China. She was a lecturer and writer about Oriental art. They had one son, Alain.

After the war, they lived in Japan where he became the Far Eastern general manager of the Insurance Company of North America. Next, he worked for Pan-American World Airways as the general personnel manager. He became the executive director of the International Center for overseas students in Midtown, New York. He then moved to Tokyo, Japan where he was both vice president of Prismo Safety Products, a Pennsylvania highway safety and building equipment company, and the Far East representative of the Potter Brothers, a highway building equipment dealer from New Jersey.

In 1966, Carr died from congestive heart failure in Tokyo at the age of 56. He was buried in Graceland Cemetery in Pine Bluff, Arkansas.
