= Börje Strandvall =

Finnish sprinter

Personal information
- Nationality: Finnish
- Born: 22 January 1909
- Died: 20 July 1987 (aged 78)

Sport
- Sport: Sprinting
- Event: 200 metres

Börje Strandvall (22 January 1909 – 20 July 1987) was a Finnish sprinter. He competed in the men's 200 metres at the 1936 Summer Olympics.
