= Walter Nehb =

German sprinter

Personal information
- Nationality: German
- Born: 3 December 1908
- Died: 6 March 1966 (aged 57)

Sport
- Sport: Sprinting
- Event: 400 metres

Walter Nehb (3 December 1908 – 6 March 1966) was a German sprinter. He competed in the men's 400 metres at the 1932 Summer Olympics.
