= Grant McDougall =

American hammer thrower

Personal information
- Born: October 12, 1910 Duluth, United States
- Died: December 9, 1958 (aged 48) Cleveland, United States

Sport
- Sport: Athletics
- Event: Hammer throw

Grant McDougall (October 12, 1910 – December 9, 1958) was an American athlete. He competed in the men's hammer throw at the 1932 Summer Olympics.

He was the grandson of ship designer Alexander McDougall. Competing for the Penn Quakers track and field team, McDougall won the 1932 NCAA Track and Field Championships in the hammer throw.
