= Seikan Oki =

Japanese sprinter

Personal information
- Nationality: Japanese
- Born: 14 January 1907
- Died: 19 October 2000 (aged 93)

Sport
- Sport: Sprinting
- Event: 400 metres

Seikan Oki (大木 正幹, Ōki Seikan; 14 January 1907 – 19 October 2000) was a Japanese sprinter. He competed in the men's 400 metres at the 1932 Summer Olympics.
