= Hjalmar Johannessen =

Norwegian sprinter (1907–1959)

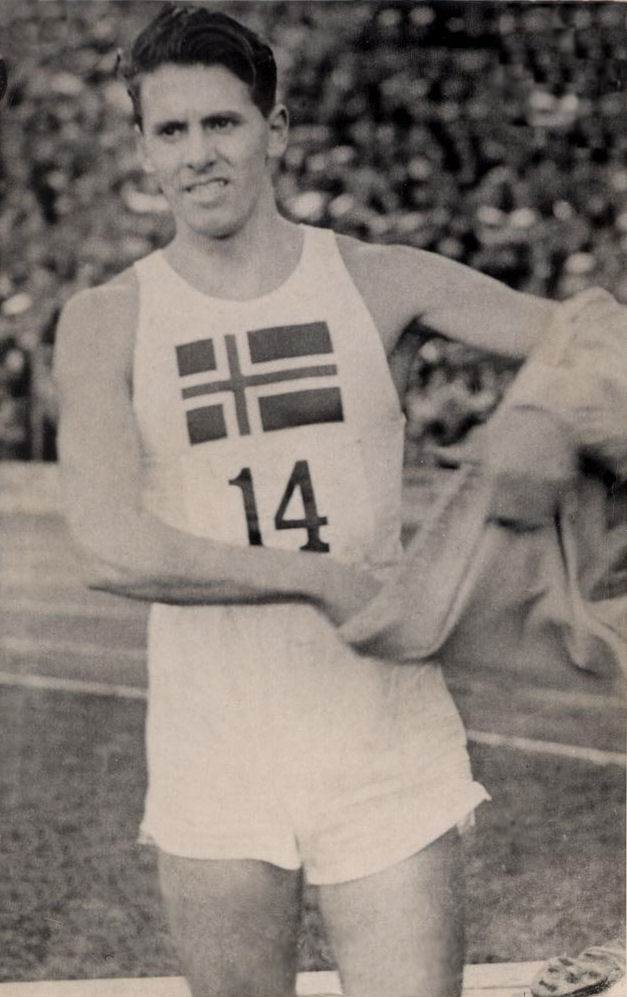

Personal information
- Born: 24 May 1907 Trondheim, Norway
- Died: 19 August 1959 (aged 52) Oslo

Sport
- Sport: Athletics
- Club: SK Freidig

Hjalmar "Hjalle" Johannessen (24 May 1907 – 19 August 1959) was a Norwegian athlete who specialized in the 400 and 800 metres, and later a sports writer. He was born in Trondheim, and as an athlete he represented the local club SK Freidig; later Oslo TF.

== Competition record ==
Year	Competition	Venue	Position	Event	Notes
Representing Norway
1932	1932 Summer Olympics	Los Angeles	Quarterfinal (400 M)	800 meters, 1:54.3 minutes 400 meters, 49.4seconds	
1936	1936 Summer Olympics	Los Angeles	Semi-final (800 M)	800 meters, 1:56.0 minutes	

He became Norwegian 400 metres champion in 1928, 1929, 1930, 1931 and 1935, and 800 metres champion in 1928, 1929, 1931, 1933, 1936 and 1937.

His personal best time was 1:52.1 minutes, achieved in September 1935 in Stockholm. In the 400 metres he had 48.6 seconds, achieved in September 1935 at Bislett stadion.

After retiring he was a sports editor in the newspaper Morgenposten. In 1946 he married Gunvor Høidal from Oslo. The marriage ended in divorce in 1952. He died in 1959.
