= Tatsuzo Fujita =

Japanese hurdler

Personal information
- Nationality: Japanese
- Born: 19 May 1908

Sport
- Sport: Track and field
- Event: 110 metres hurdles

Tatsuzo Fujita (藤田 辰三, Fujita Tatsuzō; born 19 May 1908, date of death unknown) was a Japanese hurdler. He competed in the men's 110 metres hurdles at the 1932 Summer Olympics.

== Career ==
He graduated from the former Tsuyama Junior High School (now Okayama Prefectural Tsuyama Junior and Senior High School).

In 1932, he graduated from the Physical Education Department of Tokyo Higher Normal School.

On May 14, 1932, he set a record of 15.0 seconds in the 110-meters hurdles at the All Japan Intercollegiate Track and Field Championships (a Japanese record and also a Japanese student record), and he matched this record at the Olympic Athletes Farewell Competition on June 22 of the same year.

He competed in the men's 110-meter hurdles at the 1932 Los Angeles Olympics, but was eliminated in the semi-finals.
