= Willi Welscher =

German hurdler

Personal information
- Nationality: German
- Born: 1 August 1906
- Died: 20 February 1987 (aged 80)

Sport
- Sport: Track and field
- Event: 110 metres hurdles

Willi Welscher (1 August 1906 – 20 February 1987) was a German hurdler. He competed in the 110 metres hurdles at the 1932 Summer Olympics and the 1936 Summer Olympics.
