= Karl Warner =

American sprinter (1908–1995)

Personal information
- Full name: Karl DeWitt Warner
- Born: June 23, 1908
- Died: September 5, 1995 (aged 87)
Medal record
Men's athletics
Representing the United States
Olympic Games
Gold medal – first place	1932 Los Angeles	4 × 400 m relay
|}

Karl DeWitt Warner (June 23, 1908 – September 5, 1995) was an American athlete, winner of a gold medal in 4 × 400 m relay at the 1932 Summer Olympics.

At the Los Angeles Olympics, Warner ran the third leg in the American 4 × 400 m relay team, which won the gold medal with a new world record of 3.08.2.

Warner died in Rochester, New York, aged 87.
