= Ivan Fuqua =

American track and field athlete

Olympic medal record

Men's athletics

Representing the United States
Gold medal – first place	1932 Los Angeles	4 × 400 m relay

Ivan William Fuqua (August 11, 1909 – January 14, 1994) was an American athlete, a gold medal winner in the 4 × 400 m relay at the 1932 Summer Olympics in Los Angeles. He was a sophomore at Indiana University and was IU's first Olympic Gold Medalist. Their team set a world record that stood for 20 years. He was inducted into the IU Athletics Hall of Fame in 1988. Fuqua was born in Decatur, Illinois, and graduated from Brazil High School in Brazil, Indiana, where he set multiple track and field school records. He then went on to play football and excel in track and field at Indiana University, Bloomington, Indiana.

== Biography ==
Fuqua was an AAU champion in 400 m in 1933 and 1934. At the Los Angeles Olympics, or Games of the X Olympiad, Fuqua ran the opening leg in the American 4 × 400 m relay team, winning the gold medal - Indiana University's first - with a new world record of 3:08.2.

After graduation, Ivan Fuqua was appointed track coach at Connecticut State (now the University of Connecticut). He entered the Navy during World War II, and was discharged in 1946 with the rank of lieutenant commander. He joined Brown University as a coach. He stayed there as head coach from 1947 until 1973, when he retired. He later became a manager and co-owner of Galilee Beach Club in Rhode Island.

In 1968, he was inducted into the Rhode Island Heritage Hall of Fame. In 1981, Fuqua was inducted into the Brown University Hall of Fame.

Ivan Fuqua died in Providence, Rhode Island at the age of 84.
