= Sten Pettersson =

Swedish hurdler

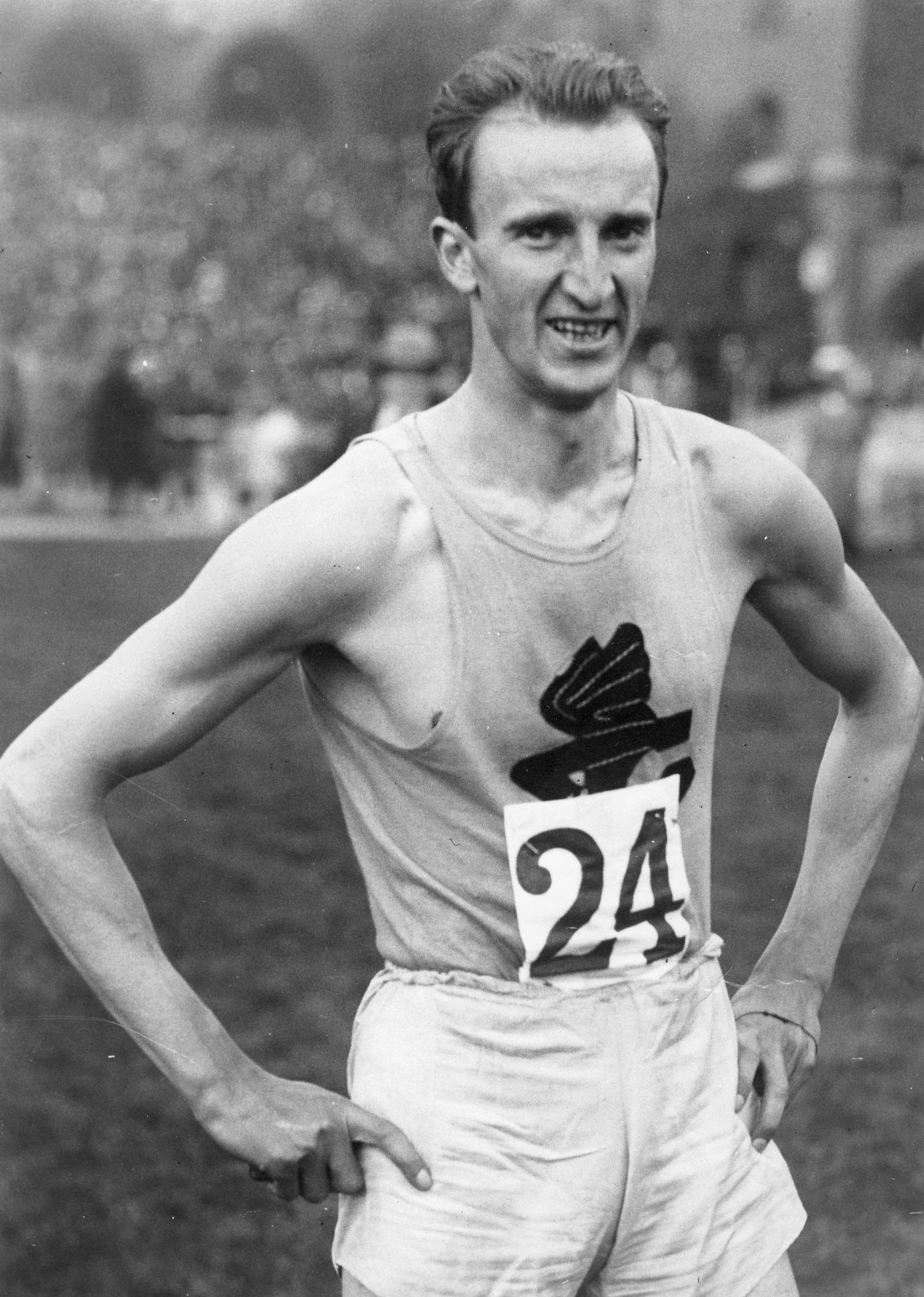
- Sten Pettersson in the 1920's

Personal information
- Born: 11 September 1902 Stockholm, Sweden
- Died: 1 June 1984 (aged 81) Stockholm, Sweden
- Height: 1.90 m (6 ft 3 in)
- Weight: 79 kg (174 lb)

Sport
- Sport: Athletics
- Event(s): 110, 400 m hurdles; 400 m
- Club: IK Göta

Achievements and titles
- Personal best(s): 110 m hurdles – 14.5 (1930); 400 m hurdles – 52.4 (1928); 400 m – 49.5 (1929)
Medal record
Representing Sweden
Olympic Games
Bronze medal – third place	1924 Paris	110 m hurdles

Sten Karl Leopold "Sten-Pelle" Pettersson (11 September 1902 – 1 June 1984) was a Swedish track and field athlete who competed in sprint and hurdling events. He competed at the 1924, 1928 and 1932 Summer Olympics in the 110 and 400 m hurdles and 400 m and 4 × 400 m sprint relay (six events in total). He won a bronze medal in the 110 m hurdles in 1924, and finished fourth in the 400 m hurdles and 4 × 400 m relay in 1928, while failing to reach the finals on other occasions.

Pettersson held two world records, for about a year each, in the 110 m (1927–1928) and 400 m hurdles (1925–1927). In 1925 he became the first recipient of the Svenska Dagbladet Gold Medal.

Awards
Preceded by None	Svenska Dagbladet Gold Medal; 1925	Succeeded by Arne Borg and Edvin Wide
