= George Saling =

American hurdler

Medal record

Men's athletics

Representing the United States

Olympic Games
Gold medal – first place	1932 Los Angeles	110 m hurdles

George J. Saling (July 27, 1909 – April 15, 1933) was an American track and field athlete, winner of 110 m hurdles at the 1932 Summer Olympics.

Saling was born in Memphis, Missouri, but the family moved to Corydon, Iowa when George was three months old. He graduated from Corydon High School in 1927 and was the captain of the basketball team. At the University of Iowa, Saling established himself as a world class hurdler during his senior year, in 1932, winning the NCAA Championships in 110 m hurdles, equaling the Percy Beard's world record of 14.4. At the AAU Championships, Saling lost in 110 m hurdles final to Jack Keller by 4 feet (1.2 m), but won the 200 m hurdles title, thus earning a place in the Olympic team.

At the Los Angeles Olympic Games, Saling beat his chief rival, Percy Beard, in the semi-final by 0.2 seconds and then again in the final by 0.1 seconds.

That would remain his last victory on the track, because George Saling was killed in a car accident in Missouri six months after the Olympic Games, aged only 23.
