= Percy Beard =

American athlete (1908–1990)

Biographical details
- Born: January 26, 1908; Hardinsburg, Kentucky, U.S.
- Died: March 27, 1990 (aged 82); Gainesville, Florida, U.S.

Playing career
- 1926–1929: Alabama Polytechnic Inst.
- Position: Hurdler

Coaching career (HC unless noted)
- 1937–1964: University of Florida

Accomplishments and honors

Championships
- Southeastern Conference (1953, 1956)

Awards
- National Track and Field Hall of Fame; University of Florida Athletic Hall of Fame

Percy Beard
Medal record

Men's track and field

Representing the United States

Olympic Games
Silver medal – second place	1932 Los Angeles	110 metre hurdles

Percy Morris Beard (January 26, 1908 – March 27, 1990) was an American college and international track and field athlete who specialized in the high hurdles event, and won an Olympic silver medal. Beard later became a nationally prominent college track and field coach at the University of Florida.

== Athletic career ==
Percy Beard was born in Hardinsburg, Kentucky in 1908. He became a world-class hurdler at Alabama Polytechnic Institute (now Auburn University) in Auburn, Alabama. After graduating from Auburn with a bachelor's degree in civil engineering in 1929, he later competed for the New York Athletic Club in Amateur Athletic Union (AAU) competition. He set a world record of 14.2 seconds in the 120-yard high hurdles in 1931 and tied the record again in 1934. A seven-time national AAU high hurdles champion, Beard won the silver medal in the 110-meter high hurdles event at the 1932 Summer Olympic Games in Los Angeles, finishing second behind U.S. teammate George Saling.

== Coaching career ==
Following his competition running career, Beard later became the head coach of the Florida Gators track and field at the University of Florida in Gainesville, Florida, serving from 1937 to 1964. Under Beard, the Gators won the Southeastern Conference (SEC) outdoor track and field championship twice and were the runners-up four times. While he was the Gators' head coach, he founded the Florida Relays in 1939, which became one of the country's top collegiate track and field events. He used his Auburn civil engineering background to develop all-weather running tracks and unveiled the first full-scale all-weather track at the 1959 Florida Relays.

== Legacy and honors ==
Beard was a member of the U.S. Track and Field and Cross Country Coaches Association Hall of Fame, and was elected to the United States National Track and Field Hall of Fame in 1981. The University of Florida honored Beard by naming its track and field facility, Percy Beard Track, for him in 1978. He was inducted into the University of Florida Athletic Hall of Fame as an "honorary letter winner" in 1976.

Beard died in Gainesville in 1990; he was 82 years old. He was survived by his wife Sara, and their three sons.

== See also ==
- Florida Gators
- History of the University of Florida
- List of Auburn University people
- List of Olympic medalists in athletics (men)
- List of University of Florida Olympians
- List of University of Florida Athletic Hall of Fame members
- University Athletic Association
