= 4 × 100 metres relay at the Olympics =

4 × 100 metres relay at the Olympic Games

Overview
- Sport: Athletics
- Gender: Men and women
- Years held: Men: 1912–2024; Women: 1928–2024

Olympic record
- Men: Jamaica (Nesta Carter, Michael Frater, Yohan Blake, Usain Bolt) 36.84 (2012)
- Women: United States (Tianna Bartoletta, Allyson Felix, Bianca Knight, Carmelita Jeter) 40.82 (2012)

Reigning champion
- Men: Canada (Aaron Brown (sprinter), Jerome Blake, Brendon Rodney, Andre De Grasse)
- Women: United States (Melissa Jefferson, Twanisha Terry, Gabby Thomas, Sha'Carri Richardson)

The 4 × 100 metres relay at the Summer Olympics is the shortest track relay event held at the multi-sport event. The men's relay has been present on the Olympic athletics programme since 1912 and the women's event has been continuously held since the 1928 Olympic Games in Amsterdam. It is the most prestigious 4 × 100 m relay race at elite level.

The competition has two parts: a first round and an eight-team final. Historically, there has been a semi-final round, but this has been eliminated as selection is now determined by time – the sixteen fastest nations during a pre-Olympic qualification period are entered. Since 1988, teams may enter up to six athletes for the event. Larger nations typically have two reserves runners in the first round in order to preserve the fitness of their top runners for the final. Heat runners of medal-winning teams receive medals even if they did not run in the final.

The Olympic records for the event were both set at the 2012 Olympic Games in London: the Jamaican men's team ran 36.84 seconds and the American women's team won with 40.82 seconds, both of them world records. The men's world record has been broken and equalled at the Olympics on numerous occasions. The record was set at six consecutive editions from 1912 to 1936, then five straight editions from 1956 to 1972. Since then, the men's Olympic final has been won in a world record time in 1984, 1992, and 2012. The women's world record has been similarly linked to the Olympics: the record was broken on the first three occasions it was contested as an Olympic event (1928 to 1936). It was then improved at six successive Olympics from 1952 to 1972. The women's world record at the 2012 Olympic Games ended the forty-year absence of such a feat.

The United States is by far the most successful nation in the event. The country has won the men's race 15 times and the women's race on 12 occasions. The American men were dominant historically, accruing eight straight wins from 1920 to 1956, but have also logged numerous disqualifications (chiefly due to baton pass failures), including five straight from 2008 to 2024 (also in 1912, 1960, and 1988). The American women took four consecutive gold medals from 1984 to 1996. As of 2016, no other country has won more than three golds in the men's or women's event. Jamaica (four wins, nine medals), Canada (three wins, ten medals), Great Britain (two wins, fifteen medals) and the Soviet Union (two wins, eleven medals) are the next most successful nations.

Participants in this event are often competitors in the 100 metres and 200 metres individual Olympic events (and, less commonly, the sprint hurdles). Frank Wykoff and Evelyn Ashford are the most successful athletes in the event, having each won three gold medals. In terms of total career medals, the most successful is Jamaica's Veronica Campbell-Brown with four (one gold and three silvers). Only eight other athletes have won three medals in the event: Marlies Göhr (twice champion), Shelly-Ann Fraser-Pryce (once champion), Aaron Brown (once champion), Brendon Rodney (once champion), Andre De Grasse (once champion), Lyudmila Zharkova, Dina Asher-Smith, and Daryll Neita.

== Medal summary ==
=== Men ===
Games	Gold	Silver	Bronze
1912 Stockholm	Great Britain; David Jacobs; Henry Macintosh; Victor d'Arcy; Willie Applegarth	Sweden; Ivan Möller; Charles Luther; Ture Persson; Knut Lindberg	none awarded
1920 Antwerp	United States; Charley Paddock; Jackson Scholz; Loren Murchison; Morris Kirksey	France; René Lorain; René Tirard; René Mourlon; Émile Ali-Khan	Sweden; Agne Holmström; William Petersson; Sven Malm; Nils Sandström
1924 Paris	United States; Loren Murchison; Louis Clarke; Frank Hussey; Al LeConey	Great Britain; Harold Abrahams; Walter Rangeley; Wilfred Nichol; Lancelot Royle	Netherlands; Jan de Vries; Jaap Boot; Harry Broos; Rinus van den Berge
1928 Amsterdam	United States; Frank Wykoff; James Quinn; Charley Borah; Henry Russell	Germany; Georg Lammers; Richard Corts; Hubert Houben; Helmut Körnig	Great Britain; Cyril Gill; Edward Smouha; Walter Rangeley; Jack London
1932 Los Angeles	United States; Bob Kiesel; Emmett Toppino; Hector Dyer; Frank Wykoff	Germany; Helmut Körnig; Friedrich Hendrix; Erich Borchmeyer; Arthur Jonath	Italy; Giuseppe Castelli; Ruggero Maregatti; Gabriele Salviati; Edgardo Toetti
1936 Berlin	United States; Jesse Owens; Ralph Metcalfe; Foy Draper; Frank Wykoff	Italy; Orazio Mariani; Gianni Caldana; Elio Ragni; Tullio Gonnelli	Germany; Wilhelm Leichum; Erich Borchmeyer; Erwin Gillmeister; Gerd Hornberger
1948 London	United States; Barney Ewell; Lorenzo Wright; Harrison Dillard; Mel Patton	Great Britain; Jack Archer; Jack Gregory; Alastair McCorquodale; Kenneth Jones	Italy; Michele Tito; Enrico Perucconi; Antonio Siddi; Carlo Monti
1952 Helsinki	United States; Dean Smith; Harrison Dillard; Lindy Remigino; Andy Stanfield	Soviet Union; Boris Tokarev; Levan Kalyayev; Levan Sanadze; Vladimir Sukharev	Hungary; László Zarándi; Géza Varasdi; György Csányi; Béla Goldoványi
1956 Melbourne	United States; Ira Murchison; Leamon King; Thane Baker; Bobby Morrow	Soviet Union; Leonid Bartenyev; Boris Tokarev; Yuriy Konovalov; Vladimir Sukharev	United Team of Germany; Lothar Knörzer; Leonhard Pohl; Heinz Fütterer; Manfred Germar
1960 Rome	United Team of Germany; Bernd Cullmann; Armin Hary; Walter Mahlendorf; Martin Lauer	Soviet Union; Gusman Kosanov; Leonid Bartenyev; Yuriy Konovalov; Edvin Ozolin	Great Britain; Peter Radford; David Jones; David Segal; Nick Whitehead
1964 Tokyo	United States; Paul Drayton; Gerry Ashworth; Richard Stebbins; Bob Hayes	Poland; Andrzej Zieliński; Wiesław Maniak; Marian Foik; Marian Dudziak	France; Paul Genevay; Bernard Laidebeur; Claude Piquemal; Jocelyn Delecour
1968 Mexico City	United States; Charles Greene; Mel Pender; Ronnie Ray Smith; Jim Hines	Cuba; Hermes Ramírez; Juan Morales; Pablo Montes; Enrique Figuerola	France; Gérard Fenouil; Jocelyn Delecour; Claude Piquemal; Roger Bambuck
1972 Munich	United States; Larry Black; Robert Taylor; Gerald Tinker; Eddie Hart	Soviet Union; Aleksandr Kornelyuk; Vladimir Lovetskiy; Juris Silovs; Valeriy Borzov	West Germany; Jobst Hirscht; Karlheinz Klotz; Gerhard Wucherer; Klaus Ehl
1976 Montreal	United States; Harvey Glance; Lam Jones; Millard Hampton; Steve Riddick	East Germany; Manfred Kokot; Jörg Pfeifer; Klaus-Dieter Kurrat; Alexander Thieme	Soviet Union; Aleksandr Aksinin; Nikolay Kolesnikov; Juris Silovs; Valeriy Borzov
1980 Moscow	Soviet Union; Vladimir Muravyov; Nikolay Sidorov; Aleksandr Aksinin; Andrey Prokofyev	Poland; Krzysztof Zwoliński; Zenon Licznerski; Leszek Dunecki; Marian Woronin	France; Antoine Richard; Pascal Barré; Patrick Barré; Hermann Panzo
1984 Los Angeles	United States; Sam Graddy; Ron Brown; Calvin Smith; Carl Lewis	Jamaica; Albert Lawrence; Greg Meghoo; Don Quarrie; Ray Stewart	Canada; Ben Johnson; Tony Sharpe; Desai Williams; Sterling Hinds
1988 Seoul	Soviet Union; Viktor Bryzhin; Vladimir Krylov; Vladimir Muravyov; Vitaliy Savin	Great Britain; Elliot Bunney; John Regis; Mike McFarlane; Linford Christie	France; Bruno Marie-Rose; Daniel Sangouma; Gilles Quénéhervé; Max Morinière
1992 Barcelona	United States; Michael Marsh; Leroy Burrell; Dennis Mitchell; Carl Lewis; James Jett*	Nigeria; Oluyemi Kayode; Chidi Imoh; Olapade Adeniken; Davidson Ezinwa; Osmond Ezinwa*	Cuba; Andrés Simón; Joel Lamela; Joel Isasi; Jorge Aguilera
1996 Atlanta	Canada; Robert Esmie; Glenroy Gilbert; Bruny Surin; Donovan Bailey; Carlton Chambers*	United States; Jon Drummond; Tim Harden; Michael Marsh; Dennis Mitchell; Tim Montgomery*	Brazil; Arnaldo da Silva; Robson da Silva; Édson Ribeiro; André Domingos
2000 Sydney	United States; Jon Drummond; Bernard Williams; Brian Lewis; Maurice Greene; Tim Montgomery*; Kenny Brokenburr*	Brazil; Vicente de Lima; Édson Ribeiro; André Domingos; Claudinei da Silva; Cláudio Roberto Souza	Cuba; José Ángel César; Luis Alberto Pérez-Rionda; Ivan García; Freddy Mayola
2004 Athens	Great Britain; Jason Gardener; Darren Campbell; Marlon Devonish; Mark Lewis-Francis	United States; Shawn Crawford; Justin Gatlin; Coby Miller; Maurice Greene; Darvis Patton*	Nigeria; Olusoji Fasuba; Uchenna Emedolu; Aaron Egbele; Deji Aliu
2008 Beijing	Trinidad and Tobago; Keston Bledman; Marc Burns; Emmanuel Callender; Richard Thompson; Aaron Armstrong*	Japan; Naoki Tsukahara; Shingo Suetsugu; Shinji Takahira; Nobuharu Asahara	Brazil; Vicente de Lima; Sandro Viana; Bruno de Barros; José Carlos Moreira
2012 London	Jamaica; Nesta Carter; Michael Frater; Yohan Blake; Usain Bolt; Kemar Bailey-Cole*	Trinidad and Tobago; Richard Thompson; Marc Burns; Emmanuel Callender; Keston Bledman	France; Jimmy Vicaut; Christophe Lemaitre; Pierre-Alexis Pessonneaux; Ronald Pognon
2016 Rio de Janeiro	Jamaica; Asafa Powell; Yohan Blake; Nickel Ashmeade; Usain Bolt; Jevaughn Minzie*; Kemar Bailey-Cole*	Japan; Ryota Yamagata; Shōta Iizuka; Yoshihide Kiryū; Asuka Cambridge	Canada; Akeem Haynes; Aaron Brown; Brendon Rodney; Andre De Grasse; Bolade Ajomale*
2020 Tokyo	Italy; Lorenzo Patta; Marcell Jacobs; Fausto Desalu; Filippo Tortu	Canada; Aaron Brown; Jerome Blake; Brendon Rodney; Andre De Grasse	China; Tang Xingqiang; Xie Zhenye; Su Bingtian; Wu Zhiqiang
2024 Paris	Canada; Aaron Brown; Jerome Blake; Brendon Rodney; Andre De Grasse	South Africa; Bayanda Walaza; Shaun Maswanganyi; Bradley Nkoana; Akani Simbine	Great Britain; Jeremiah Azu; Louie Hinchliffe; Nethaneel Mitchell-Blake; Zharnel Hughes; Richard Kilty*

Note: * Indicates athletes who ran in preliminary rounds and also received medals.

==== Multiple medalists ====
Rank	Athlete	Nation	Olympics	Gold	Silver	Bronze	Total
1	Frank Wykoff	United States	1928–1936	3	0	0	3
2	Loren Murchison	United States	1920-1924	2	0	0	2
2	Harrison Dillard	United States	1948–1952	2	0	0	2
2	Vladimir Muravyov	Soviet Union	1980–1988	2	0	0	2
2	Carl Lewis	United States	1984–1992	2	0	0	2
2	Usain Bolt	Jamaica	2008–2016	2	0	0	2
2	Kemar Bailey-Cole	Jamaica	2012–2016	2	0	0	2
2	Yohan Blake	Jamaica	2012–2016	2	0	0	2
9	Aaron Brown	Canada	2016–2024	1	1	1	3
9	Andre De Grasse	Canada	2016–2024	1	1	1	3
9	Brendon Rodney	Canada	2016–2024	1	1	1	3
12	Michael Marsh	United States	1992–1996	1	1	0	2
12	Dennis Mitchell	United States	1992–1996	1	1	0	2
12	Jon Drummond	United States	1996–2000	1	1	0	2
15	Tim Montgomery	United States	1996–2000	1	1	0	2
15	Maurice Greene	United States	2000–2004	1	1	0	2
15	Keston Bledman	Trinidad and Tobago	2008–2012	1	1	0	2
15	Marc Burns	Trinidad and Tobago	2008–2012	1	1	0	2
15	Emmanuel Callender	Trinidad and Tobago	2008–2012	1	1	0	2
15	Richard Thomson	Trinidad and Tobago	2008–2012	1	1	0	2
15	Jerome Blake	Canada	2020–2024	1	1	0	2
22	Aleksandr Aksinin	Soviet Union	1976–1980	1	0	1	2
23	Helmut Körnig	Germany	1928–1932	0	2	0	2
23	Vladimir Sukharev	Soviet Union	1952–1956	0	2	0	2
23	Boris Tokarev	Soviet Union	1952–1956	0	2	0	2
23	Leonid Bartenev	Soviet Union	1956–1960	0	2	0	2
23	Yuriy Konovalov	Soviet Union	1956–1960	0	2	0	2
23	Darvis Patton	United States	2004–2012	0	2	0	2
29	Walter Rangeley	Great Britain	1924–1928	0	1	1	2
29	Erich Borchmeyer	Germany	1932–1936	0	1	1	2
29	Valeriy Borzov	Soviet Union	1972–1976	0	1	1	2
29	Juris Silovs	Soviet Union	1972–1976	0	1	1	2
29	Edson Ribeiro	Brazil	1996–2000	0	1	1	2
29	André da Silva	Brazil	1996–2000	0	1	1	2
29	Vicente de Lima	Brazil	2000–2008	0	1	1	2
36	Jocelyn Delecour	France	1964–1968	0	0	2	2
36	Claude Piquemal	France	1964–1968	0	0	2	2

==== Medals by country ====
Rank	Nation	Gold	Silver	Bronze	Total
1	United States	15	2	0	17
2	Soviet Union	2	4	1	7
3	Great Britain	2	3	3	8
4	Canada	2	1	2	5
5	Jamaica	2	1	0	3
6	Germany^{[nb]}	1	2	2	5
7	Italy	1	1	2	4
8	Trinidad and Tobago	1	1	0	2
9	Poland	0	2	0	2
9	Japan	0	2	0	2
11	France	0	1	5	6
12	Cuba	0	1	2	3
12	Brazil	0	1	2	3
14	Nigeria	0	1	1	2
14	Sweden	0	1	1	2
16	West Germany	0	1	0	1
16	South Africa	0	1	0	1
18	East Germany	0	0	1	1
18	Hungary	0	0	1	1
18	Netherlands	0	0	1	1
18	China	0	0	1	1

- ^{nb} The German total includes teams both competing as Germany and the United Team of Germany, but not East or West Germany.

=== Women ===
Games	Gold	Silver	Bronze
1928 Amsterdam	Canada; Fanny Rosenfeld; Ethel Smith; Jane Bell; Myrtle Cook	United States; Mary Washburn; Jessie Cross; Loretta McNeil; Betty Robinson	Germany; Rosa Kellner; Leni Schmidt; Anni Holdmann; Leni Junker
1932 Los Angeles	United States; Mary Carew; Evelyn Furtsch; Annette Rogers; Wilhelmina von Bremen	Canada; Mildred Fizzell; Lillian Palmer; Mary Frizzell; Hilda Strike	Great Britain; Eileen Hiscock; Gwendoline Porter; Violet Webb; Nellie Halstead
1936 Berlin	United States; Harriet Bland; Annette Rogers; Betty Robinson; Helen Stephens	Great Britain; Eileen Hiscock; Violet Olney; Audrey Brown; Barbara Burke	Canada; Dorothy Brookshaw; Jeanette Dolson; Hilda Cameron; Aileen Meagher
1948 London	Netherlands; Xenia Stad-de Jong; Netti Witziers-Timmer; Gerda van der Kade-Koudijs; Fanny Blankers-Koen	Australia; Shirley Strickland; June Maston; Betty McKinnon; Joyce King	Canada; Viola Myers; Nancy Mackay; Diane Foster; Patricia Jones
1952 Helsinki	United States; Mae Faggs; Barbara Jones; Janet Moreau; Catherine Hardy	Germany; Ursula Knab; Maria Sander; Helga Klein; Marga Petersen	Great Britain; Sylvia Cheeseman; June Foulds; Jean Pickering; Heather Armitage
1956 Melbourne	Australia; Shirley Strickland de la Hunty; Norma Croker; Fleur Mellor; Betty Cuthbert	Great Britain; Anne Pashley; Jean Scrivens; June Foulds; Heather Armitage	United States; Mae Faggs; Margaret Matthews; Wilma Rudolph; Isabelle Daniels
1960 Rome	United States; Martha Hudson; Lucinda Williams; Barbara Jones; Wilma Rudolph	United Team of Germany; Martha Langbein; Anni Biechl; Brunhilde Hendrix; Jutta Heine	Poland; Teresa Wieczorek; Barbara Sobotta; Celina Jesionowska; Halina Richter
1964 Tokyo	Poland; Teresa Ciepły; Irena Kirszenstein; Halina Górecka; Ewa Kłobukowska	United States; Willye White; Wyomia Tyus; Marilyn White; Edith McGuire	Great Britain; Janet Simpson; Mary Rand; Daphne Arden; Dorothy Hyman
1968 Mexico City	United States; Barbara Ferrell; Margaret Bailes; Mildrette Netter; Wyomia Tyus	Cuba; Marlene Elejarde; Fulgencia Romay; Violetta Quesada; Miguelina Cobián	Soviet Union; Lyudmila Zharkova; Galina Bukharina; Vera Popkova; Lyudmila Samotyosova
1972 Munich	West Germany; Christiane Krause; Ingrid Mickler-Becker; Annegret Richter; Heide Rosendahl	East Germany; Evelin Kaufer; Christina Heinich; Bärbel Struppert; Renate Stecher	Cuba; Marlene Elejarde; Carmen Valdés; Fulgencia Romay; Silvia Chivás
1976 Montreal	East Germany; Marlies Oelsner; Renate Stecher; Carla Bodendorf; Bärbel Eckert	West Germany; Elvira Possekel; Inge Helten; Annegret Richter; Annegret Kroniger	Soviet Union; Tatyana Prorochenko; Lyudmila Maslakova; Nadezhda Besfamilnaya; Vera Anisimova
1980 Moscow	East Germany; Romy Müller; Bärbel Wöckel; Ingrid Auerswald; Marlies Göhr	Soviet Union; Vera Komisova; Lyudmila Maslakova; Vera Anisimova; Natalya Bochina	Great Britain; Heather Oakes; Kathy Smallwood-Cook; Beverley Goddard; Sonia Lannaman
1984 Los Angeles	United States; Alice Brown; Jeanette Bolden; Chandra Cheeseborough; Evelyn Ashford	Canada; Angela Bailey; Marita Payne; Angella Taylor-Issajenko; France Gareau	Great Britain; Simmone Jacobs; Kathy Smallwood-Cook; Beverley Callander; Heather Oakes
1988 Seoul	United States; Alice Brown; Sheila Echols; Florence Griffith Joyner; Evelyn Ashford; Dannette Young*	East Germany; Silke Möller; Kerstin Behrendt; Ingrid Auerswald; Marlies Göhr	Soviet Union; Lyudmila Kondratyeva; Galina Malchugina; Marina Zhirova; Natalya Pomoschnikova; Maia Azarashvili*
1992 Barcelona	United States; Evelyn Ashford; Esther Jones; Carlette Guidry; Gwen Torrence; Michelle Finn*	Unified Team; Olga Bogoslovskaya; Galina Malchugina; Marina Trandenkova; Irina Privalova	Nigeria; Beatrice Utondu; Faith Idehen; Christy Opara-Thompson; Mary Onyali-Omagbemi
1996 Atlanta	United States; Gail Devers; Inger Miller; Chryste Gaines; Gwen Torrence; Carlette Guidry*	Bahamas; Eldece Clarke; Chandra Sturrup; Savatheda Fynes; Pauline Davis-Thompson; Debbie Ferguson*	Jamaica; Michelle Freeman; Juliet Cuthbert; Nikole Mitchell; Merlene Ottey; Gillian Russell*; Andria Lloyd*
2000 Sydney	Bahamas; Savatheda Fynes; Chandra Sturrup; Pauline Davis-Thompson; Debbie Ferguson; Eldece Clarke-Lewis*	Jamaica; Tayna Lawrence; Veronica Campbell; Beverly McDonald; Merlene Ottey; Merlene Frazer*	United States; Chryste Gaines; Torri Edwards; Nanceen Perry; ~~Marion Jones~~^{[nb]} Passion Richardson*
2004 Athens	Jamaica; Tayna Lawrence; Sherone Simpson; Aleen Bailey; Veronica Campbell; Beverly McDonald*	Russia; Olga Stulneva; Yuliya Tabakova; Irina Khabarova; Larisa Kruglova	France; Véronique Mang; Muriel Hurtis-Houairi; Sylviane Félix; Christine Arron
2008 Beijing	Belgium; Kim Gevaert; Élodie Ouédraogo; Hanna Mariën; Olivia Borlée	Nigeria; Halimat Ismaila; Oludamola Osayomi; Agnes Osazuwa; Gloria Kemasuode; Ene Franca Idoko*	Brazil; Rosemar Coelho Neto; Lucimar de Moura; Thaissa Presti; Rosângela Santos
2012 London	United States; Tianna Madison; Allyson Felix; Bianca Knight; Carmelita Jeter; Jeneba Tarmoh*; Lauryn Williams*	Jamaica; Shelly-Ann Fraser-Pryce; Sherone Simpson; Veronica Campbell-Brown; Kerron Stewart; Samantha Henry-Robinson*; Schillonie Calvert*	Ukraine; Olesya Povh; Khrystyna Stuy; Mariya Ryemyen; Yelyzaveta Bryzhina
2016 Rio de Janeiro	United States; Tianna Bartoletta; Allyson Felix; English Gardner; Tori Bowie; Morolake Akinosun*	Jamaica; Christania Williams; Elaine Thompson; Veronica Campbell-Brown; Shelly-Ann Fraser-Pryce; Simone Facey*; Shashalee Forbes*	Great Britain; Asha Philip; Desirèe Henry; Dina Asher-Smith; Daryll Neita
2020 Tokyo	Jamaica; Briana Williams; Elaine Thompson-Herah; Shelly-Ann Fraser-Pryce; Shericka Jackson; Natasha Morrison*; Remona Burchell*	United States; Javianne Oliver; Teahna Daniels; Jenna Prandini; Gabrielle Thomas; English Gardner*; Aleia Hobbs*	Great Britain; Asha Philip; Imani Lansiquot; Dina Asher-Smith; Daryll Neita
2024 Paris	United States; Melissa Jefferson; Twanisha Terry; Gabrielle Thomas; Sha'Carri Richardson	Great Britain; Dina Asher-Smith; Imani Lansiquot; Amy Hunt; Daryll Neita; Bianca Williams*; Desirèe Henry*	Germany; Alexandra Burghardt; Lisa Mayer; Gina Lückenkemper; Rebekka Haase; Sophia Junk*

Note: * Indicates athletes who ran in preliminary rounds and also received medals.

- ^{nb} Note: Marion Jones was stripped of all her Olympic medals.
- In 2008 the Russian team of Evgeniya Polyakova, Aleksandra Fedoriva, Yulia Gushchina, and Yuliya Chermoshanskaya were initially awarded the gold medals. However, the medals were rescinded in 2016 following disqualification of Chermoshanskaya for use of performance-enhancing drugs.

==== Multiple medalists ====
Rank	Athlete	Nation	Olympics	Gold	Silver	Bronze	Total
1	Evelyn Ashford	United States	1984–1992	3	0	0	3
2	Marlies Göhr	East Germany	1976–1988	2	1	0	3
3	Annette Rogers	United States	1932–1936	2	0	0	2
3	Alice Brown	United States	1984–1988	2	0	0	2
3	Carlette Guidry	United States	1992–1996	2	0	0	2
3	Gwen Torrence	United States	1992–1996	2	0	0	2
3	Tianna Bartoletta	United States	2012–2016	2	0	0	2
3	Allyson Felix	United States	2012–2016	2	0	0	2
9	Veronica Campbell-Brown	Jamaica	2000–2016	1	3	0	4
10	Shelly-Ann Fraser-Pryce	Jamaica	2012–2020	1	2	0	3
11	Shirley Strickland	Australia	1948–1956	1	1	0	2
11	Wyomia Tyus	United States	1964–1968	1	1	0	2
11	Annegret Richter	West Germany	1972–1976	1	1	0	2
11	Renate Stecher	East Germany	1972–1976	1	1	0	2
11	Ingrid Auerswald	East Germany	1980–1988	1	1	0	2
11	Eldece Clarke-Lewis	Bahamas	1996–2000	1	1	0	2
11	Pauline Davis-Thompson	Bahamas	1996–2000	1	1	0	2
11	Debbie Ferguson	Bahamas	1996–2000	1	1	0	2
11	Savatheda Fynes	Bahamas	1996–2000	1	1	0	2
11	Chandra Sturrup	Bahamas	1996–2000	1	1	0	2
11	Tayna Lawrence	Jamaica	2000–2004	1	1	0	2
11	Beverly McDonald	Jamaica	2000–2004	1	1	0	2
11	Sherone Simpson	Jamaica	2004–2012	1	1	0	2
11	Elaine Thompson-Herah	Jamaica	2016-2020	1	1	0	2
11	Gabrielle Thomas	United States	2020-2024	1	1	0	2
26	Mae Faggs	United States	1952–1956	1	0	1	2
26	Teresa Ciepły	Poland	1956–1960	1	0	1	2
26	Halina Górecka	Poland	1956–1960	1	0	1	2
26	Wilma Rudolph	United States	1956–1960	1	0	1	2
26	Chryste Gaines	United States	1996–2000	1	0	1	2
31	Lyudmila Zharkova	Soviet Union	1968–1980	0	1	2	3
31	Dina Asher-Smith	Great Britain	2016–2024	0	1	2	3
31	Daryll Neita	Great Britain	2016–2024	0	1	2	3
34	Eileen Hiscock	Great Britain	1932–1936	0	1	1	2
34	June Foulds	Great Britain	1952–1956	0	1	1	2
34	Marlene Elejarde	Cuba	1968–1972	0	1	1	2
34	Fulgencia Romay	Cuba	1968–1972	0	1	1	2
34	Vera Anisimova	Soviet Union	1976–1980	0	1	1	2
34	Galina Malchugina	Soviet Union; Unified Team	1988–1992	0	1	1	2
34	Merlene Ottey	Jamaica	1996–2000	0	1	1	2
34	Desirèe Henry	Great Britain	2016–2024	0	1	1	2
34	Imani Lansiquot	Great Britain	2020–2024	0	1	1	2
43	Beverley Goddard	Great Britain	1980–1984	0	0	2	2
43	Heather Oakes	Great Britain	1980–1984	0	0	2	2
43	Kathy Smallwood-Cook	Great Britain	1980–1984	0	0	2	2
43	Asha Philip	Great Britain	2016–2020	0	0	2	2

==== Medals by country ====
Rank	Nation	Gold	Silver	Bronze	Total
1	United States	12	2	2	16
2	Jamaica	2	3	1	6
3	East Germany	2	2	0	4
4	Canada	1	2	2	5
5	Australia	1	1	0	2
5	Bahamas	1	1	0	2
5	West Germany	1	1	0	2
8	Poland	1	0	1	2
9	Belgium	1	0	0	1
9	Netherlands	1	0	0	1
11	Great Britain	0	3	6	9
12	Germany^{[nb]}	0	3	2	5
13	Soviet Union	0	1	3	4
14	Cuba	0	1	1	2
14	Nigeria	0	1	1	2
16	Russia	0	1	0	1
16	Unified Team	0	1	0	1
18	Brazil	0	0	1	1
18	France	0	0	1	1
18	Ukraine	0	0	1	1

- ^{nb} The German total includes teams both competing as Germany and the Unified Team of Germany, but not East or West Germany.

== Finishing times ==
=== Top ten fastest Olympic times ===
Fastest men's times at the Olympics
Rank	Time (sec)	Nation	Athletes	Games	Round	Date
1	36.84 (WR)	Jamaica (JAM)	Nesta Carter, Michael Frater, Yohan Blake, Usain Bolt	2012	Final	11 August
2	37.27	Jamaica (JAM)	Asafa Powell, Yohan Blake, Nickel Ashmeade, Usain Bolt	2016	Final	19 August
3	37.39	Jamaica (JAM)	Nesta Carter, Michael Frater, Yohan Blake, Kemar Bailey-Cole	2012	Heats	10 August
4	37.40	United States (USA)	Michael Marsh, Leroy Burrell, Dennis Mitchell, Carl Lewis	1992	Final	8 August
5	37.47	United States (USA)	Christian Coleman, Fred Kerley, Kyree King, Courtney Lindsey	2024	Heats	8 August
6=	37.50	Italy (ITA)	Lorenzo Patta, Marcell Jacobs, Eseosa Desalu, Filippo Tortu	2020	Final	6 August
6=	37.50	Canada (CAN)	Aaron Brown, Jerome Blake, Brendon Rodney, Andre De Grasse	2024	Final	9 August
8	37.57	South Africa (RSA)	Bayanda Walaza, Shaun Maswanganyi, Bradley Nkoana, Akani Simbine	2024	Final	9 August
9	37.60	Japan (JPN)	Ryota Yamagata, Shota Iizuka, Yoshihide Kiryu, Asuka Cambridge	2016	Final	19 August
10=	37.61	United States (USA)	Jon Drummond, Bernard Williams, Brian Lewis, Maurice Greene	2000	Final	30 September
10=	37.61	Great Britain (GBR)	Jeremiah Azu, Louie Hinchliffe, Nethaneel Mitchell-Blake, Zharnel Hughes	2024	Final	9 August

Fastest women's times at the Olympics
Rank	Time (sec)	Nation	Athletes	Games	Round	Date
1	40.82 (WR)	United States (USA)	Tianna Madison, Allyson Felix, Bianca Knight, Carmelita Jeter	2012	Final	11 August
2	41.01	United States (USA)	Tianna Bartoletta, Allyson Felix, English Gardner, Tori Bowie	2016	Final	19 August
3	41.02	Jamaica (JAM)	Briana Williams, Elaine Thompson-Herah, Shelly-Ann Fraser-Pryce, Shericka Jackson	2020	Final	6 August
4	41.36	Jamaica (JAM)	Christania Williams, Elaine Thompson, Veronica Campbell-Brown, Shelly-Ann Fraser-Pryce	2016	Final	19 August
5	41.41	Jamaica (JAM)	Shelly-Ann Fraser-Pryce, Sherone Simpson, Veronica Campbell-Brown, Kerron Stewart	2012	Final	11 August
6	41.45	United States (USA)	Javianne Oliver, Teahna Daniels, Jenna Prandini, Gabrielle Thomas	2020	Final	6 August
7	41.55	Great Britain (GBR)	Asha Philip, Imani-Lara Lansiquot, Dina Asher-Smith, Daryll Neita	2020	Heats	5 August
8	41.60	East Germany (GDR)	Romy Müller, Bärbel Wöckel, Ingrid Auerswald, Marlies Göhr	1980	Final	1 August
9	41.64	United States (USA)	Tianna Madison, Jeneba Tarmoh, Bianca Knight, Lauryn Williams	2012	Heats	10 August
10	41.65	United States (USA)	Alice Brown, Jeanette Bolden, Chandra Cheeseborough, Evelyn Ashford	1984	Final	11 August
