= Athletics at the 1928 Summer Olympics – Men's 4 × 100 metres relay =

Men's 4 × 100 metres relay at the Games of the IX Olympiad
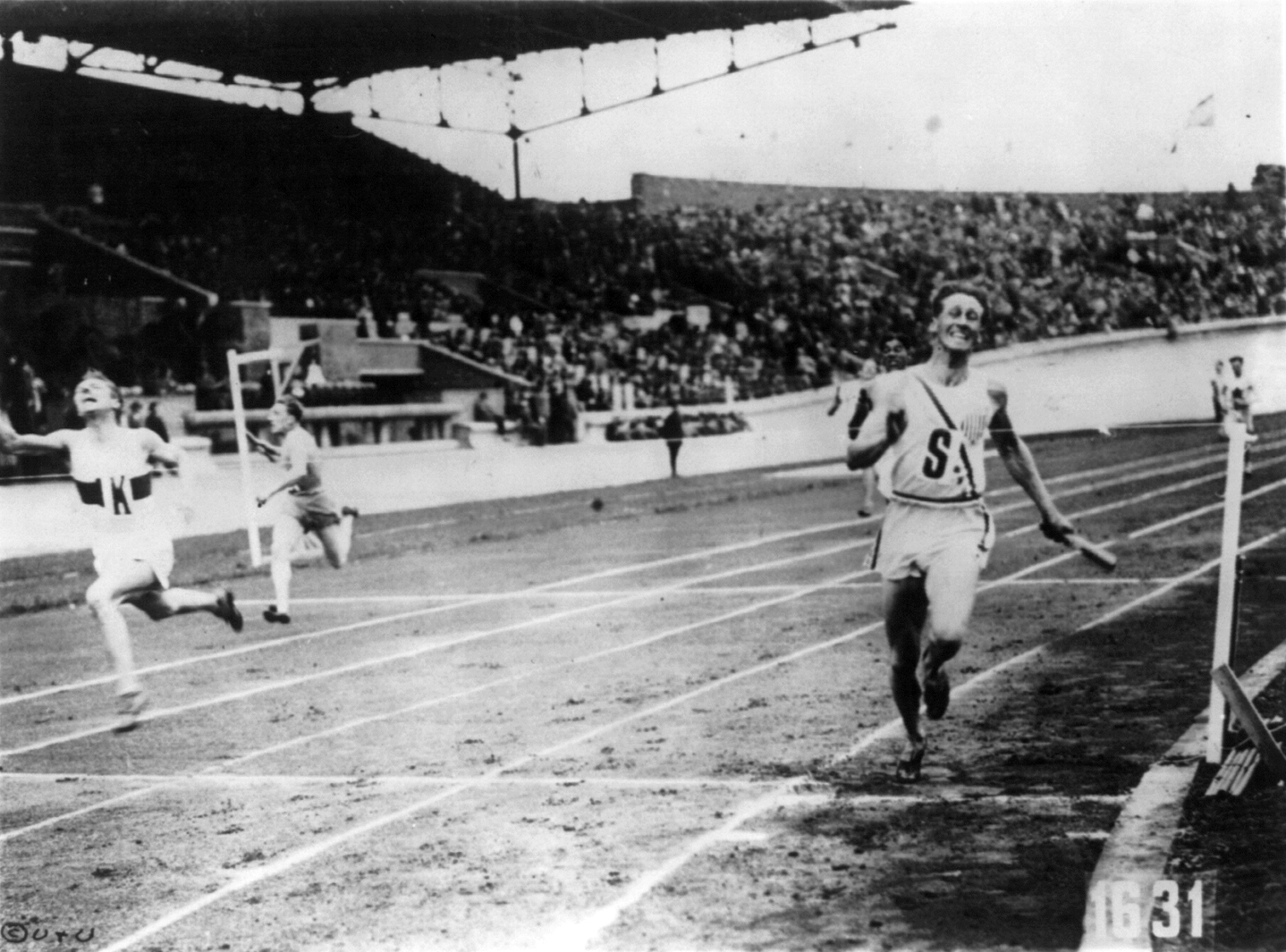
- Henry Russell (right) crossing the finish line in the final
- Venue: Olympic Stadium
- Dates: August 4, 1928 (heats); August 5, 1928 (final)
- Competitors: from 13 nations
- Teams: 13
- Winning time: 41.0

Medalists
1st place, gold medalist(s)		Frank Wykoff; James Quinn; Charles Borah; Henry Russell	United States
2nd place, silver medalist(s)		Georg Lammers; Richard Corts; Hubert Houben; Helmut Körnig	Germany
3rd place, bronze medalist(s)		Cyril Gill; Edward Smouha; Walter Rangeley; Jack London	Great Britain

The men's 4 × 100 metres relay event at the 1928 Olympic Games took place between August 4 & August 5.

== Results ==
=== Heats ===
Heat 1

Rank	Country	Athletes	Time	Notes
1	Canada	Ralph Adams, Johnny Fitzpatrick, Buck Hester, Percy Williams	42.2	Q
2	Great Britain	Cyril Gill, Teddy Smouha, Walter Rangeley, Jack London	43.5	Q
3	Italy	Giuseppe Castelli, Franco Reyser, Edgardo Toetti, Enrico Torre		
4	Greece	Vangelis Moiropoulos, Konstantinos Petridis, Angelos Lambrou, Renos Frangoudis	44.0	
5	Spain	Juan Serrahima, Diego Ordóñez, Fernando Muñagorri, Enrique de Chávarri		

Key: Q = Qualified

Heat 2

Rank	Country	Athletes	Time	Notes
1	France	André Cerbonney, Gilbert Auvergne, André Dufau, André Mourlon	41.8	Q
2	Germany	Georg Lammers, Richard Corts, Hubert Houben, Helmut Körnig		Q
3	Belgium	Paul Brochart, Fred Zinner, Adolphe Groscol, Willy Dujardin		

Key: Q = Qualified

Heat 3

Rank	Country	Athletes	Time	Notes
1	United States	Frank Wykoff, Jimmy Quinn, Charley Borah, Hank Russell	41.2	Q
2	Switzerland	Emmanuel Goldsmith, Willy Weibel, Willy Tschopp, Hans Niggl	42.6	Q
3	Japan	Iwao Aizawa, Seishichi Inuma, Shigetoshi Osawa, Chuhei Nanbu		
4	Turkey	Semih Türkdoğan, Şinasi Şahingiray, Haydar Aşan, Mehmet Ali Aybar		
	Hungary	Ferenc Gerő, János Paizs, István Sugár, István Raggambi		DSQ

Key: DSQ = Disqualified, Q = Qualified

=== Final ===
Rank	Country	Athletes	Time	Notes
1st place, gold medalist(s)	United States	Frank Wykoff, Jimmy Quinn, Charley Borah, Hank Russell	41.0	=WR
2nd place, silver medalist(s)	Germany	Georg Lammers, Richard Corts, Hubert Houben, Helmut Körnig	41.2	
3rd place, bronze medalist(s)	Great Britain	Cyril Gill, Teddy Smouha, Walter Rangeley, Jack London	41.8	
4	France	André Cerbonney, Gilbert Auvergne, André Dufau, André Mourlon	42.0	
5	Switzerland	Emmanuel Goldsmith, Willy Weibel, Willy Tschopp, Hans Niggl	42.6	
	Canada	Ralph Adams, Johnny Fitzpatrick, Buck Hester, Percy Williams		DSQ

Key: DSQ = Disqualified, =WR = Equalled world record
