= Dufau =

Dufau is a French surname. Notable people with the surname include:

- André Dufau (1905–1990), French sprinter
- Clémentine-Hélène Dufau (1869–1937), French artist
- Jean-Pierre Dufau (born 1943), French politician
- Jenny Dufau (1878–1924), French opera singer
- Julien Dufau (1888–1916), French rugby union player
- Loïc Dufau (born 1989), French footballer
- Pierre Dufau (1908–1985), French architect
