= Percy Williams (sprinter) =

Canadian sprinter

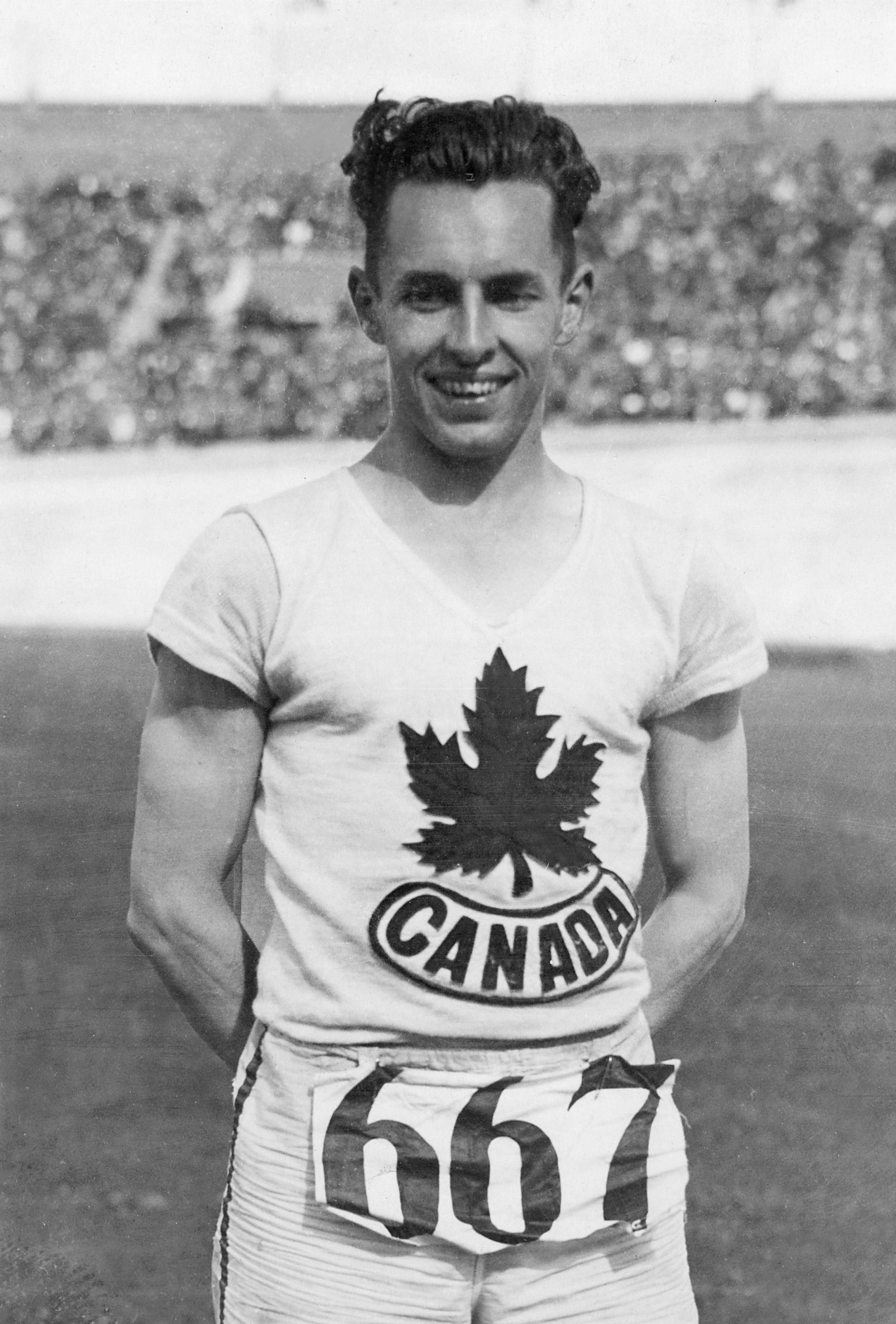
- Percy Williams at the 1928 Olympics

Personal information
- Born: May 19, 1908 Vancouver, British Columbia, Canada
- Died: November 29, 1982 (aged 74) Vancouver, British Columbia, Canada
- Height: 1.70 m (5 ft 7 in)
- Weight: 56 kg (123 lb)

Sport
- Sport: Sprint running
- Club: Vancouver Athletic Club
Medal record
Representing Canada
Olympic Games
Gold medal – first place	1928 Amsterdam	100 metres
Gold medal – first place	1928 Amsterdam	200 metres
British Empire Games
Gold medal – first place	1930 Hamilton	100 yards

Percy Alfred Williams (May 19, 1908 – November 29, 1982) was a Canadian athlete, winner of the 100 and 200 metres races at the 1928 Summer Olympics and a former world record holder for the 100 metres sprint.

== Early life ==
Williams was the only child of Frederick Williams, who was originally from England, and Charlotte Rhodes, who hailed from St. John's, Newfoundland. At the age of 15, Williams suffered from rheumatic fever and was advised to avoid strenuous physical activities. However, as his high school required participation in athletic competitions, he started training in sprint in 1924 and by 1927 became a local champion.

== Olympic competition ==
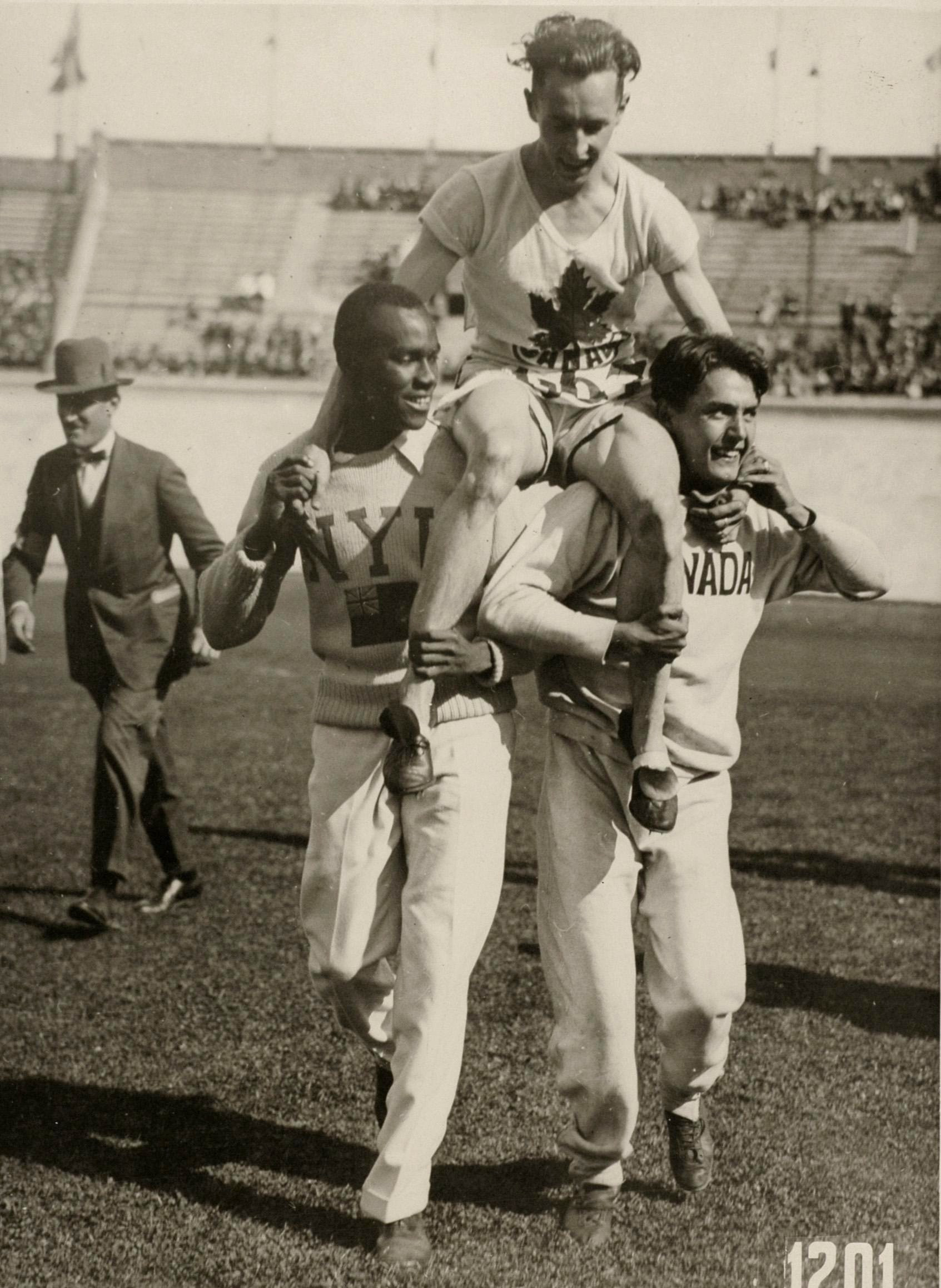
Williams hoisted aloft by Phil Edwards (left) and Brant Little after winning the 100 metres at the 1928 Olympics.

At the 1928 Olympic trials, Williams won the 100 and 200 metres races, equaling the Olympic 100 metres record of 10.6 seconds.

To earn his travel ticket for the trials, Williams and his volunteer coach, Bob Granger, worked as waiters and dishwashers in a railroad dining car, and Vancouver track fans raised the money to pay Granger's transatlantic ship passage to the 1928 Olympics.

In the second round of the 100 metres at Amsterdam, Williams again equaled the Olympic record with a time of 10.6 seconds and did the same in his semi-final, but placed second to Bob McAllister. The final opened with two false starts, first by Wilfred Legg and then one by Frank Wykoff. Williams took the lead off the start and never relinquished it, winning the gold over Jack London with Georg Lammers third. Williams then won the 200 metres two days later, coming from behind to overtake Helmut Körnig, who had led out of the bend. It was Williams' eighth race in four days and he was the first non-American to complete the sprint double. Williams was also part of the Canadian team which was disqualified in the final of the 4 × 100 metre relay contest.

Williams's victories were front-page news in Canada and he returned a national hero, feted by enormous crowds across the country. An estimated 25,000 people turned out to welcome him at the Canadian Pacific Railway station at the foot of Granville Street in Vancouver. Williams was met off the train by Mayor L. D. Taylor and Premier Simon Fraser Tolmie. They bundled him and Granger into cars and paraded them through the confetti-filled city. The event was broadcast live by reporters with microphones stationed along the route.

Williams showed that his success was not an accident, setting a World Record at the Canadian Track and Field Championships at Varsity Stadium in Toronto in 1930. He then won the 100 yard dash at the inaugural British Empire Games (now known as the Commonwealth Games) in Hamilton, Ontario, but tore the tendons in his upper left leg around the 70 yard mark and never made a full comeback. At the 1932 Summer Olympics in Los Angeles, he was eliminated in the semi-finals of the 100 metre event. With the Canadian team he finished fourth in the 4 × 100 metre relay competition. Subsequently, Williams stopped running and became an insurance agent.

== Later life and death ==
In August 1940, Williams joined the Non-Permanent Active Militia, his occupation listed as "Salesman" and religion as "C of E" (Church of England). He also served as a civilian pilot during World War II, ferrying aircraft around the country for Canadian Airways, then became a civilian flight instructor with the Royal Canadian Air Force.

In 1971, after his former mentor's death, Williams was asked how much credit was due to Granger for his Olympic success. "Offhand, I'd say 100 percent," Williams answered.

In the mid-1960s, he donated his two gold medals from the 1928 Olympics to the BC Sports Hall of Fame, saying he wanted them to be seen and remembered. In 1980, they were stolen never to be found again; gold prices at the time were at historic highs and it was suspected the medals had been melted down. It was said at that time Williams simply shrugged off the loss and no replacements were ever issued. In 2023 the stolen medals were replaced by newly minted replicas, recreated by the International Olympic Committee at the request of Williams family, who then rededicated them to B.C. Sports Hall of Fame.

In later years, Williams grew bitter about his sporting experiences, culminating in being the only living Canadian Olympic gold medalist who refused the federal government's invitation to attend the 1976 Summer Olympics in Montreal.

In 1979, he was made an Officer of the Order of Canada.

Williams, who never married, lived with his mother, Dot, until her death in 1980, at the age of 92. After that, he lived on alone and suffered from terrible arthritic pain.

A keen collector of guns, Williams shot himself in the head with a shotgun he had been awarded in 1928 as a prize for his Olympic feat. His suicide was a major surprise to everyone and no note was left. He was interred at Masonic Cemetery of British Columbia, Burnaby, Canada.

== Awards and recognition ==
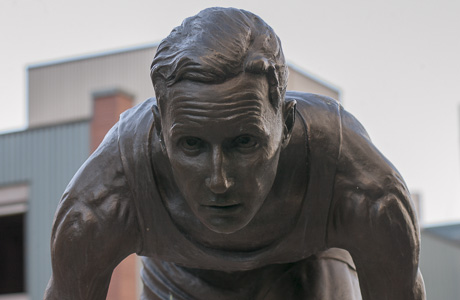
A close up of the statue of Williams which is located outside BC Place stadium in Vancouver.

In 1950, Williams was proclaimed by a Canadian press poll as Canada's greatest track athlete of the first half of the century, which was later updated in 1972 to declare him Canada's all-time greatest Olympic athlete.

Percy Williams Junior Public School located in Toronto, Ontario, is named after Williams.

In 1996, Canada Post released a postage stamp of Percy Williams as part of its "Sporting Heroes" series.

Outside the BC Sports Hall of Fame at BC Place is a life-sized statue of Williams, crouched in a sprinter's stance.

== Competition record ==
Year	Competition	Venue	Position	Event	Notes
Representing Canada
1930	British Empire Games	Hamilton, Canada	1st	100 y	9.9

== See also ==
- List of Canadian sports personalities

== External links and further reading ==
- short film of Percy Williams at the 1928 Summer Olympics (olympics.com)
- Neil Duncanson, The Fastest Men on Earth: The Story of the Men's 100 Metre Champions, HarperCollinsWillow, 1988
- Percy Williams at Find a Grave
- Percy Williams: an on-line collection of photos and memorabilia
