= 1927 AAA Championships =

Outdoor track and field competition

- Dates: 1–4 July 1927
- Host city: London, England
- Venue: Stamford Bridge
- Level: Senior
- Type: Outdoor
- Events: 23

The 1927 AAA Championships was the 1927 edition of the annual outdoor track and field competition organised by the Amateur Athletic Association (AAA). It was held from 1 to 4 July 1927 at Stamford Bridge in London, England.

The Championships consisted of 23 events and covered three days of competition. The marathon was held in Fallowfield, Manchester on 30 July.

== Results ==
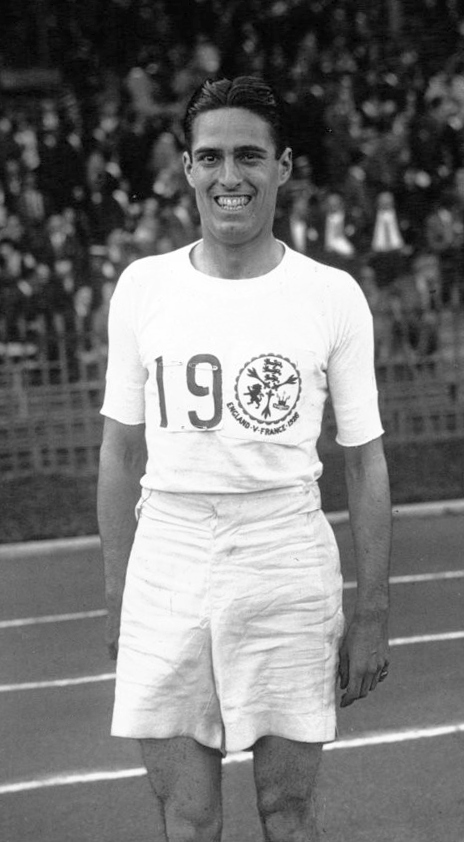
Douglas Lowe won the 440 and 880 yards events

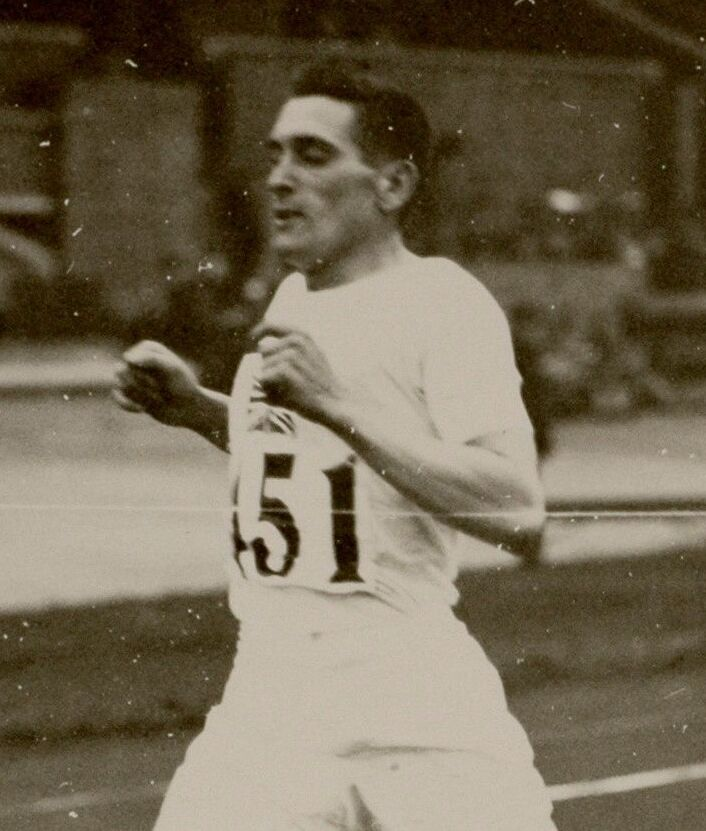
Cyril Ellis won the mile race

Event	Gold		Silver		Bronze	
100 yards	(Germany) Helmut Körnig	10.1	(Germany) Hubert Houben	1 ft	Harold Hodge	1½-2 yd
220 yards	(Germany) Hubert Houben	21.8	Guy Butler	inches	(Germany) Jokob Schuller	2 yd
440 yards	Douglas Lowe	48.8	(Italy) Alfredo Gargiullo	5-6 yd	Roger Leigh-Wood	inches
880 yards	Douglas Lowe	1:54.6	(Wales) Cecil Griffiths	1:56.8	(France) René Feger	2 yd
1 mile	Cyril Ellis	4:17.0	(Germany) Herbert Böcher	4:18.2	(France) Séra Martin	2 yd
4 miles	(Sweden) Bror Ohrn	19:40.8	Charles Frith	19:42.4	Brian Oddie	60 yd
10 miles	Ernest Harper	52:21.2	George Constable	54:26.2	Louis Payne	55:23.2
marathon	(Northern Ireland) Sam Ferris	2:48:46.4	Tom Heeley	3:00:22.4	C. E. Mitchell	3:02:13.6
steeplechase	Jack Webster	11:06.0	Edward Oliver	10:59.6	H. Blades	100 yd
120y hurdles	Frederick Gaby	14.9 NR	(South Africa) George Weightman-Smith	1 yd	(Sweden) Sten Pettersson	
440y hurdles	Lord Burghley	54.2 WR	(Scotland) Thomas Livingstone-Learmonth	55.2	(Italy) Luigi Facelli	55.4
2 miles walk	Alf Pope	14:21.6	Albert Fletcher	8 yd	C. C. Coulson	10 yd
7 miles walk	Wilf Cowley	55:46.4	L. G. Sandy	56:25.0	Edward Presland	56:59.0
high jump	(Sweden) Herbert Adolfsson	1.829	(Republic of Ireland) Con O'Connor; Jack London (Dominion of Ceylon) Thomas Tweed	1.803	n/a	
pole jump	(Sweden) Henry Lindblad	3.81	(Denmark) Henry Petersen	3.66	(Hungary) Janos Karlovits	3.66
long jump	(Germany) Rudolf Dobermann	7.31	(Sweden) Eric Svensson	7.28	(Netherlands) Willem Peters	7.28
triple jump	(Netherlands) Willem Peters	15.47	(Sweden) Eric Svensson	14.92	(Hungary) Elemér Somfay	14.25
shot put	(Germany) Georg Brechenmacher	14.18	(Hungary) József Darányi	14.16	(Germany) Ernst Söllinger	13.62
discus throw	(Hungary) Kálmán Marvalits	44.40	(Hungary) Kalman Egri	43.76	(Germany) Hans Hoffmeister	42.30
hammer throw	(Sweden) Ossian Skiöld	50.30	Malcolm Nokes	49.31	(Germany) Josef Mang	42.71
javelin throw	(Hungary) Béla Szepes	64.80	(Norway) Olav Sunde	62.12	(Denmark) Svend Gjorling	55.96
1 mile relay	Achilles Club	3m 19.2-5 sec	Surrey AC	50 yd	Herne Hill	
Tug of war	M Division Met Police		London Fire Brigade		n/a	

== See also ==
- 1927 WAAA Championships
