= Shigetoshi =

- Gender: Male

Origin
- Origin: Japanese
- Meaning: Different meanings depending on the kanji used

Shigetoshi (written: 茂利, 滋利, 繁俊, 重憲 or 重俊) is a masculine Japanese given name. Notable people with the name include:

- Shigetoshi Hasebe (長谷部 茂利; born 1971), Japanese footballer
- Shigetoshi Hasegawa (長谷川 滋利; born 1968), Japanese baseball player, writer and television personality
- Shigetoshi Miyazaki (died 1942), Imperial Japanese Air Force officer
- Shigetoshi Osawa (大沢 重憲), Japanese sprinter
- Shigetoshi Tashiro (田代 繁俊; born 1939), Japanese sport shooter
- Yoshihara Shigetoshi (吉原 重俊; 1845–1887), Japanese businessman and banker
