= Hubert Houben =

German sprinter (1898–1956)

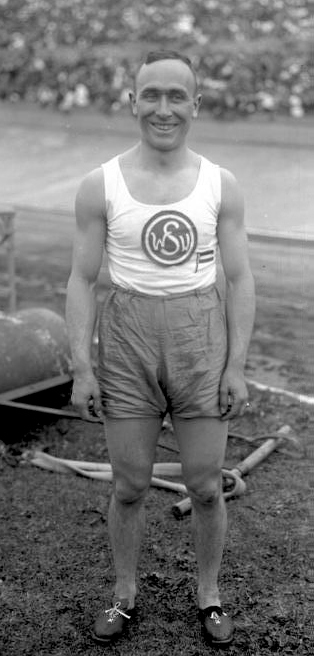
- Hubert Houben in 1924

Personal information
- Born: 24 February 1898 Goch, German Empire
- Died: 9 November 1956 (aged 58) Krefeld, West Germany
- Height: 169 cm (5 ft 7 in)
- Weight: 67 kg (148 lb)

Sport
- Sport: Athletics
- Event: Sprint
- Club: TuS Bochum

Achievements and titles
- Personal bests: 100 m – 10.4 (1927); 200 m – 21.1 (1928)
Medal record
Representing Germany
Olympic Games
Silver medal – second place	1928 Amsterdam	4 × 100 m relay

Hubert Houben (24 February 1898 – 9 November 1956) was a German sprinter who competed at the 1928 Summer Olympics. He won a silver medal in the 4 × 100 m relay, together with Georg Lammers, Richard Corts and Helmut Körnig, and failed to reach the final of individual 100 m event.

== Biography ==
Houben played football and trained in gymnastics and swimming before changing to sprint running. On 16 August 1924 he won the 100 m event at the Germany-United States meet, defeating Olympic champions Loren Murchison and Charley Paddock. He missed the 1924 Olympics, as Germany was banned from those Games because of its role in World War I. In the 4 × 100 m relay final at the 1928 Olympics the German team was leading the race, but Houben and Körnig had to slow down to avoid a faulty exchange. That relay team set a world record later in 1928. Houben did not compete at the 1936 Olympics, but was invited as a guest of honor.

Houben won the British AAA Championships title in the 220 yards event and finished second behind fellow German Helmut Körnig in the 100 yards event at the British 1927 AAA Championships.

During his career Houben won 9 national sprint titles and set 10 world and 14 European records. He took jobs of a bank employer, sports journalist, and a city hall official, and also ran his sporting goods shop. He died from throat cancer aged 58. The Hubert-Houben-Arena in Krefeld and the Hubert-Houben-Stadium in Goch carry his name.

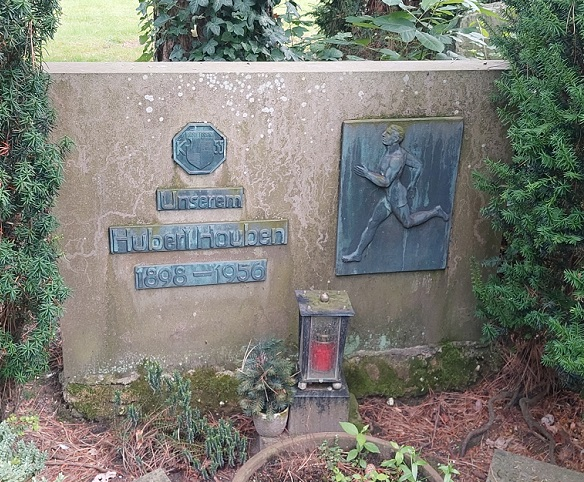
Gravesite Hubert Houben Krefeld
