= Richard Corts =

German sprinter (1905–1974)

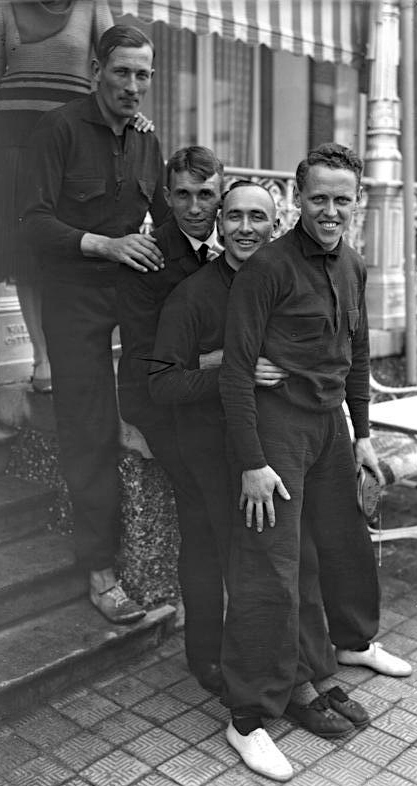
- Corts (right) in 1928

Personal information
- Born: 16 July 1905 Remscheid, German Empire
- Died: 7 August 1974 (aged 69) Remscheid, West Germany
- Height: 177 cm (5 ft 10 in)
- Weight: 68 kg (150 lb)

Sport
- Sport: Athletics
- Event: Sprint
- Club: Deutscher Sportclub Berlin

Achievements and titles
- Personal bests: 100 m – 10.4 (1928); 200 m – 21.8 (1925)
Medal record
Representing Germany
Olympic Games
| Silver medal – second place | 1928 Amsterdam | 4 × 100 m relay |

Richard Corts (16 July 1905 – 7 August 1974) was a German sprinter who competed at the 1928 Summer Olympics.

== Career ==
At the 1928 Olympic Games, Corts won a silver medal in the 4 × 100 m relay, together with Georg Lammers, Hubert Houben and Helmut Körnig, and failed to reach the final of individual 100 m event.

Corts won the national 100 m title in 1925 and 1928. He set a European record over 100 m in 1925 (10.5) and equaled the world record of 10.4 in 1928. He was part of the German 4 × 100 m relay team that set a world record at 40.8 in 1928. Corts won the British AAA Championships title in the 100 yards event at the 1926 AAA Championships.

Corts retired from athletics in 1930. After completing professional studies in Helsinki for two years, he took over his father's knife factory (Josua Corts) in his native Remscheid. He committed suicide at the age of 69.
