= Haydar Aşan =

Turkish–American sprinter (1906–1996)

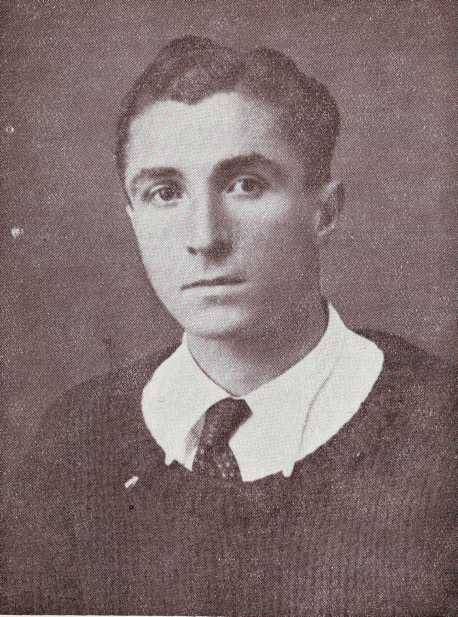

Personal information
- Nationality: Turkish / American
- Born: 16 April 1906 Istanbul
- Died: 29 February 1996 (aged 89) California

Sport
- Sport: Sprinting; High jump Pole vault Football
- Events: 4 × 100 metres relay - 1928 Summer Olympics, 1st place Athletics - 1933 Balkan Athletics Championship, 2nd place Athletics - 1931 & 1932 Balkan Athletics Championship
- College team: Fenerbahce, Galatasaray, Duke University
- Club: Galatasaray

Haydar Aşan (16 April 1906 – 29 February 1996) was a Turkish-American Olympic sprinter. He competed in the men's 4 × 100 metres relay at the 1928 Summer Olympics.

He also competed as a high jumper, pole vaulter, and professional football player. As a teenager he competed in local athletic championships and began amateur boxing. In 1924, at age 18 he joined the professional Fenerbahçe football team, a year later he changed to the Galatasaray football team and stayed there for ten years. In 1931 and 1932, Aşan won second place in the Balkan Athletics Championships. In 1933, he won first place, which was the first time in history Turkey won the gold medal in athletics at the Balkan Athletics Championships. In 1938, he moved to the United States and studied graduate school at Duke University. He played on the school's soccer team and became an American citizen. Haydar married an American veteran nurse and had two daughters.
