= Wu Zhiqiang =

Wu Zhiqiang, may refer to:

- Wu Zhiqiang (engineer) (born 1960), Chinese engineer, member of the Chinese Academy of Engineering
- Wu Zhiqiang (sprinter) (born 1994), Chinese sprinter
