= Kálmán Marvalits =

Hungarian discus thrower

Personal information
- Nationality: Hungarian
- Born: 29 July 1901 Nagykanizsa, Zala, Hungary
- Died: 1 January 1982 (aged 80) Siófok, Somogy, Hungary
- Height: 186 cm (6 ft 1 in)
- Weight: 90 kg (198 lb)

Sport
- Sport: Athletics
- Event: Shot put
- Club: NTE, Budapest/BTC, Budapest

Kálmán Marvalits (29 July 1901 – 1 January 1982) was a Hungarian athlete who competed in the 1924 Summer Olympics and in the 1928 Summer Olympics.

== Career ==
Marvalits won the British AAA Championships title in the discus throw event at the 1927 AAA Championships.
