= István Sugár (athlete) =

Hungarian sprinter

Personal information
- Nationality: Hungarian
- Born: 12 October 1904
- Died: 19 March 1991 (aged 86)

Sport
- Sport: Sprinting
- Event: 4 × 100 metres relay

István Sugár (12 October 1904 –19 March 1991) was a Hungarian sprinter. He competed in the men's 4 × 100 metres relay and the 200 metres at the 1928 Summer Olympics.
