= Seishichi Inuma =

Japanese sprinter

Personal information
- Nationality: Japanese
- Born: 27 July 1907
- Died: 1 October 1973 (aged 66)

Sport
- Sport: Sprinting
- Event: 4 × 100 metres relay

Seishichi Inuma (井沼 清七, Inuma Seishichi; 27 July 1907 – 1 October 1973) was a Japanese sprinter. He competed in the men's 4 × 100 metres relay at the 1928 Summer Olympics.
