= Hans Hoffmeister =

German discus thrower (1901–1980)

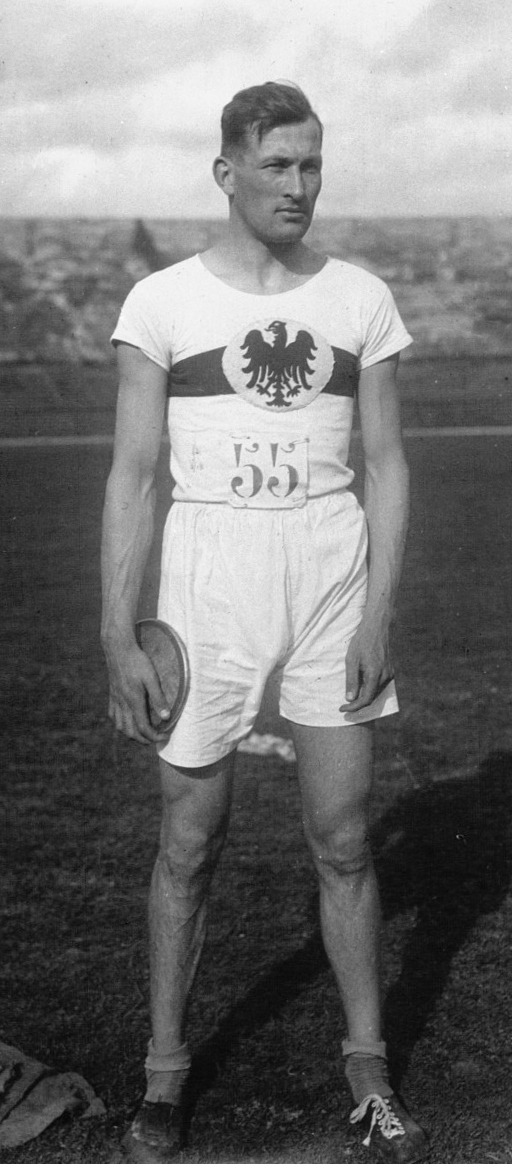
- Hoffmeister in 1927

Personal information
- Born: 17 March 1901 Münster, German Empire
- Died: 9 January 1980 (aged 78) Altenberge, West Germany
- Height: 196 cm (6 ft 5 in)
- Weight: 93 kg (205 lb)

Sport
- Sport: Athletics
- Event(s): Discus throw, javelin throw
- Club: Sportclub 08 Münster

Achievements and titles
- Personal best(s): DT – 48.77 m (1928); JT – 63.06 m (1928)

Heinrich Bernhard Karl Hoffmeister (17 March 1901 – 9 January 1980) was a German discus thrower who set a world record at 48.77 m in 1928. He showed much worse results at the 1928 Summer Olympics (best throw 39.17 m) and placed 25th.

== Career ==
Hoffmeister won the national discus title in 1926, 1930 and 1931, and finished second in javelin in 1927. Next year he won the Irish discus and javelin titles. Hoffmeister was a graphic artist and drew portraits and cartoons of many German athletes at the 1928 Olympics. He later worked for German daily newspapers.

Hoffmeister finished third behind Patrick Bermingham in the discus throw event at the British 1926 AAA Championships and finished third behind Koloman Marvalits in the discus event at the 1927 AAA Championships.
