= Henry Russell (athlete) =

American sprinter (1904–1986)

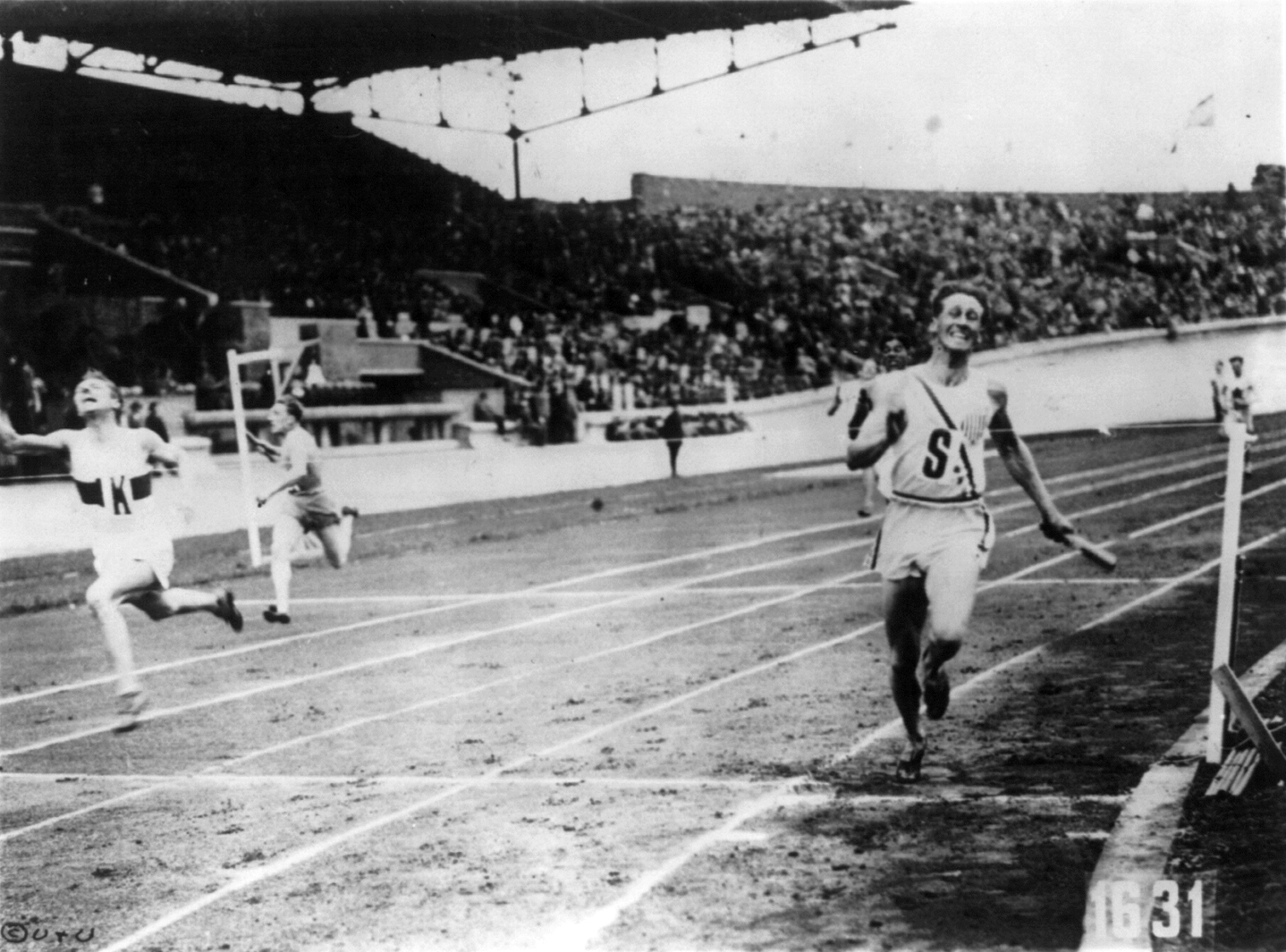
- Russell crossing the finish line at the 1928 Olympics

Medal record

Men's athletics

Representing the United States

Olympic Games
| Gold medal – first place | 1928 Amsterdam | 4 × 100 m relay |

Henry Argue Russell (December 15, 1904 – November 9, 1986) was an American track and field athlete, winner of the gold medal in the 4 × 100 m relay at the 1928 Summer Olympics.

A Cornell University student, Henry Russell won the IC4A championships in 100 yd (91 m) in 1926 and in 220 yd (200 m) in 1925 and 1926. Russell was elected to the Sphinx Head Society during his senior year.

At the Amsterdam Olympics, Russell reached the semifinals in 100 m and ran the anchoring leg in the American 4 × 100 m relay team, which equalled the world record of 41.0 s, in the final.

Henry Russell died at 81 in West Chester, Pennsylvania.
