= Shigetoshi Osawa =

Japanese sprinter

Personal information
- Nationality: Japanese
- Born: 1905

Sport
- Sport: Sprinting
- Event: 4 × 100 metres relay

Shigetoshi Osawa (大沢 重憲, Ōsawa Shigetoshi; 2 January 1905, date of death unknown) was a Japanese sprinter. He competed in the men's 4 × 100 metres relay at the 1928 Summer Olympics.
