= James Quinn (athlete) =

American sprinter (1906–2004)

Medal record

Men's athletics

Representing the United States

Olympic Games
Gold medal – first place	1928 Amsterdam	4 × 100 m relay

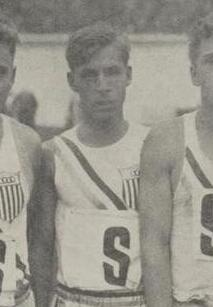
James Quinn in 1928

James F. Quinn (September 9, 1906 – July 12, 2004) was an American athlete, winner of gold medal in 4 × 100 m relay at the 1928 Summer Olympics.

As a student of College of the Holy Cross, James Quinn won the IC4A 100 yd (91 m) title in 1928.

At the Olympic Games in Amsterdam, Quinn ran the second leg in the American 4 × 100 m relay team, which won the gold medal with a world record of 41.0.

James Quinn died in Cranston, Rhode Island, aged 97.
