= Wu Zhiqiang (engineer) =

Chinese engineer

- 吴志强
- Born: 1 August 1960 (age 66); Shanghai, China
- Education: Tongji University; Technische Universität Berlin
- Scientific career
- Fields: Urban planning
- Workplaces: Tongji University

Chinese name
- Simplified Chinese: 吴志强
- Traditional Chinese: 吳志強
Transcriptions
Standard Mandarin
- Hanyu Pinyin: Wú Zhìqiáng

Wu Zhiqiang (born 1 August 1960) is a Chinese engineer who is a counsellor for Shanghai Municipal Government, a former vice president of Tongji University, and an academician of the Chinese Academy of Engineering.

== Biography ==
Wu was born in Shanghai, on 1 August 1960. He received his Bachelor of Engineering degree and Master of Engineering degree from Tongji University in 1982 and 1982, respectively. After graduating in 1985, he stayed at the university and worked as an instructor. In April 1988, he pursued advanced studies in Germany, earning Doctor of Engineering degree from Technische Universität Berlin in 1994. After university, he was recruited by the Berlin Institute of City and Architecture as a senior researcher.

Wu returned to China in 1996 and continued to teach at Tongji University. In June 1996, he was appointed deputy dean of the School of Architecture and Urban Planning, rising to dean in 2003. After this office was terminated in September 2009, he became assistant to the president, serving until September 2011. He moved up the ranks to become vice president in October 2011. He also served as chief planner for Shanghai World Expo and Qingdao International Horticultural Exposition. In July 2021, he was hired by the Shanghai Municipal Government as a counsellor.

== Views ==
Wu developed the concept of "eco+" as part of his efforts to advocate for sustainable development centered on ecological principles. "Eco+" resonates with the harmonious society slogan articulated by Hu Jintao. The concept found favor with the Chinese state.

== Honours and awards ==
- Academician of the Royal Swedish Academy of Engineering Sciences
- Fellow of the American Institute of Architects
- Fellow of the German Academy of Science and Engineering
- 27 November 2017 Member of the Chinese Academy of Engineering (CAE)
