= Edward Smouha =

British sprinter (1908–1992)

Personal information
- Nationality: British (English)
- Born: 17 December 1909 Chorlton-cum-Hardy, England
- Died: 1 April 1992 (aged 82) Geneva, Switzerland

Sport
- Sport: Athletics
- Event: Sprinter
- Club: University of Cambridge AC; Achilles Club
Medal record
Men's athletics
Representing Great Britain
Olympic Games
| Bronze medal – third place | 1928 Amsterdam | 4x100 m relay |

Edward Ralph Smouha OBE (17 December 1908 – 1 April 1992) was a British track and field athlete who competed at the 1928 Summer Olympics.

== Biography ==
Smouha was born at Chorlton-cum-Hardy, one of the nine children of Rosa Ades and Joseph Smouha. His father was an Iraqi Jew born in Baghdad who emigrated to Manchester, England, and became a successful cotton manufacturer. He later drained swampland outside Alexandria, Egypt to create a new suburb, Smouha City.

He competed for Great Britain in the 1928 Summer Olympics held in Amsterdam, Netherlands in the 4 x 100 metre relay where he won the bronze medal with his teammates Cyril Gill, Walter Rangeley and Jack London.

He studied at Magdalene College, Cambridge from 1926 to 1929, and later served in the 1940s as Wing Commander in the No. 216 Group of the Royal Air Force.

He was awarded the Order of the British Empire by Queen Elizabeth II in the 1973 Birthday Honours for his services to the British community in Geneva.

In numerous media sources, he has been attributed the name Ellis, causing confusion. Ellis Smouha was in fact his older brother.

Smouha's family included other athletes: his son Brian sprinted for Great Britain in the early 1960s, and his grandson James Espir competed for Britain in middle-distance events in the late 1970s and early 1980s. With a time of 3 minutes 56.7 seconds, Espir is reckoned to be the fastest Jewish miler of all time.
