= Cyril Gill =

British sprinter (1902–1989)

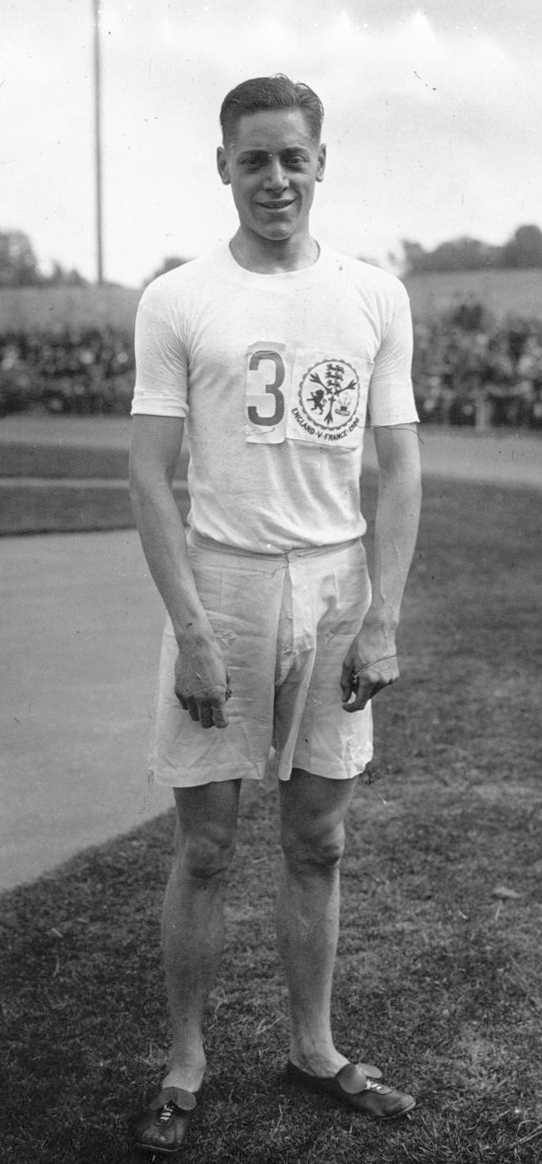
- Cyril Gill in 1926

Personal information
- Born: 21 April 1902 Holland Park in London, Great Britain
- Died: 1 September 1989 (aged 87) Jersey

Sport
- Sport: Athletics
- Events: 100 m, 200 m
- Club: Polytechnic Harriers, London

Achievements and titles
- Personal bests: 100 m – 10.8 (1926); 200 m – 21.8ye (1928)
Medal record
Representing United Kingdom
Olympic Games
Bronze medal – third place	1928 Amsterdam	4×100 m relay

Cyril William Gill (21 April 1902 – 1 September 1989) was a British sprinter who competed at the 1928 Summer Olympics in Amsterdam, the Netherlands. He won a bronze medal in the 4 × 100 m relay, together with Edward Smouha, Walter Rangeley and Jack London, and failed to reach the finals of the 100 m and 200 m events.
