= Clémentine-Hélène Dufau =

French painter

Clementine-Hélène Dufau
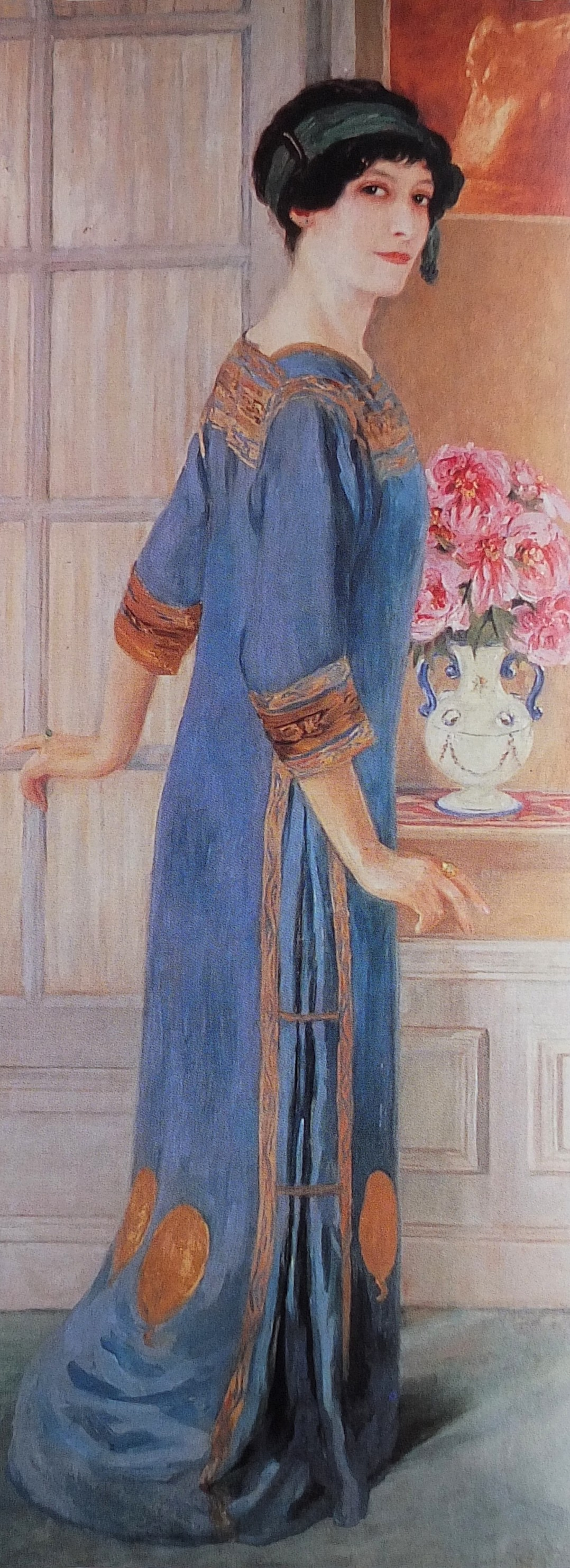
- Self-portrait (1911)
- Born: 18 August 1869; Quinsac, Gironde, France
- Died: 18 March 1937 (aged 67); Paris, France
- Known for: Painting

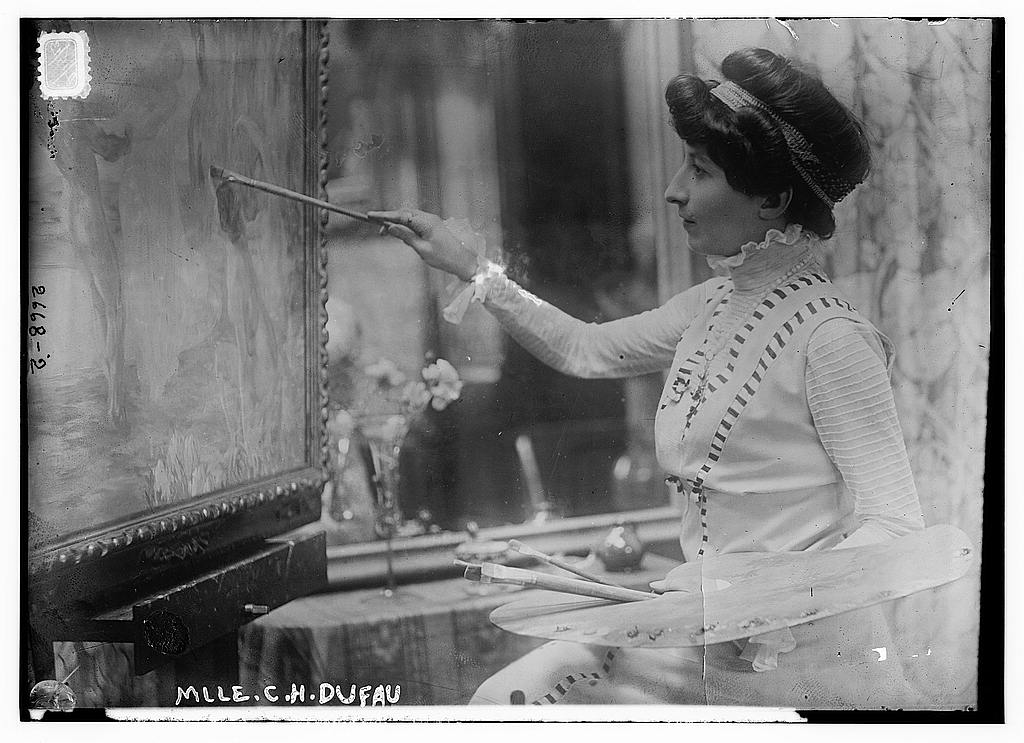
Dufau at work.

Clementine-Hélène Dufau (18 August 1869, Quinsac - 18 March 1937, Paris) was a French painter decorative artist, poster designer and illustrator.

== Biography ==
Clémentine-Hélène Dufau was born into a Gironde family through her mother, née Dumézil. Her father was an entrepreneur of Basque ancestry who made a fortune during a trip to Cuba and married the daughter of a vineyard owner when he returned. That vineyard, Le Château de Clauzel, is still in business.

She was in poor health as a child and had to spend many hours in bed, during which she began to draw. After her sisters were all married, she wanted to study art. Her parents decided to sell their interest in the vineyard and moved to Paris with her in 1888.

She enrolled at the Académie Julian; studying with William Bouguereau and Tony Robert-Fleury. In 1895, she exhibited at the Salon des Artistes Français and was awarded the Marie Bashkirtseff prize for her painting, L'Amour de l'Art. As a result, she began to receive orders for advertising posters, beginning with one for the Bal des Increvables at the Casino de Paris, followed by one to announce the launching of La Fronde, a journal founded by Marguerite Durand in 1897. The following year, she became a member of the Société des Artistes Français and obtained a scholarship to study in Spain. Back in Paris, she exhibited the works she had produced and received excellent critical acclaim.

By 1905, she was a well-established artist; working with Edmond Rostand and decorating his "Villa Arnaga" in Cambo-les-Bains. Her mother's sudden death plunged her into solitude and she developed what she herself described as a mad passion for Edmond's youngest son Maurice, who was a teenager and openly gay. This tormented relationship lasted for several years.

=== Later career ===
Named a Knight of the Legion of Honour in 1909, her career continued to expand. She received a commission from the government for decorations at new additions to the Sorbonne (panels Astronomy and Mathematics and Radioactivity and Magnetism) and portraits of numerous personalities. In 1911, she built a villa in Basque Country, but had to sell it in 1926 when her financial situation began to deteriorate. She set up a studio in Antibes, facing the sea. It was later occupied by other artists; notably Nicolas de Staël and the sculptor, Abel Chrétien, both of whom died there.

She became an adept of René Guénon and a passionate admirer of the young Krishnamurti. In 1932, she wrote Les Trois Couleurs de la Lumière, in which she expounded her esoteric vision of art. In addition to Guénon, she was inspired by the theories of the aesthetician, Charles Henry, and the gnostic, Paul-François-Gaspard Lacuria (1806-1890), author of The Harmonies of Being. Her work was also part of the painting event in the art competition at the 1932 Summer Olympics. She denounced violence against women and launched an appeal for gender equality.

She finally had to leave Antibes and rent her workshop. She returned to Paris and exhibited at the Salon of the Société des femmes artistes modernes. In 1937, she died of stomach cancer and was buried at the Cimetière parisien de Thiais, in the section for indigents. It is only since the 1990s that her work has been rediscovered.

== Selected works ==
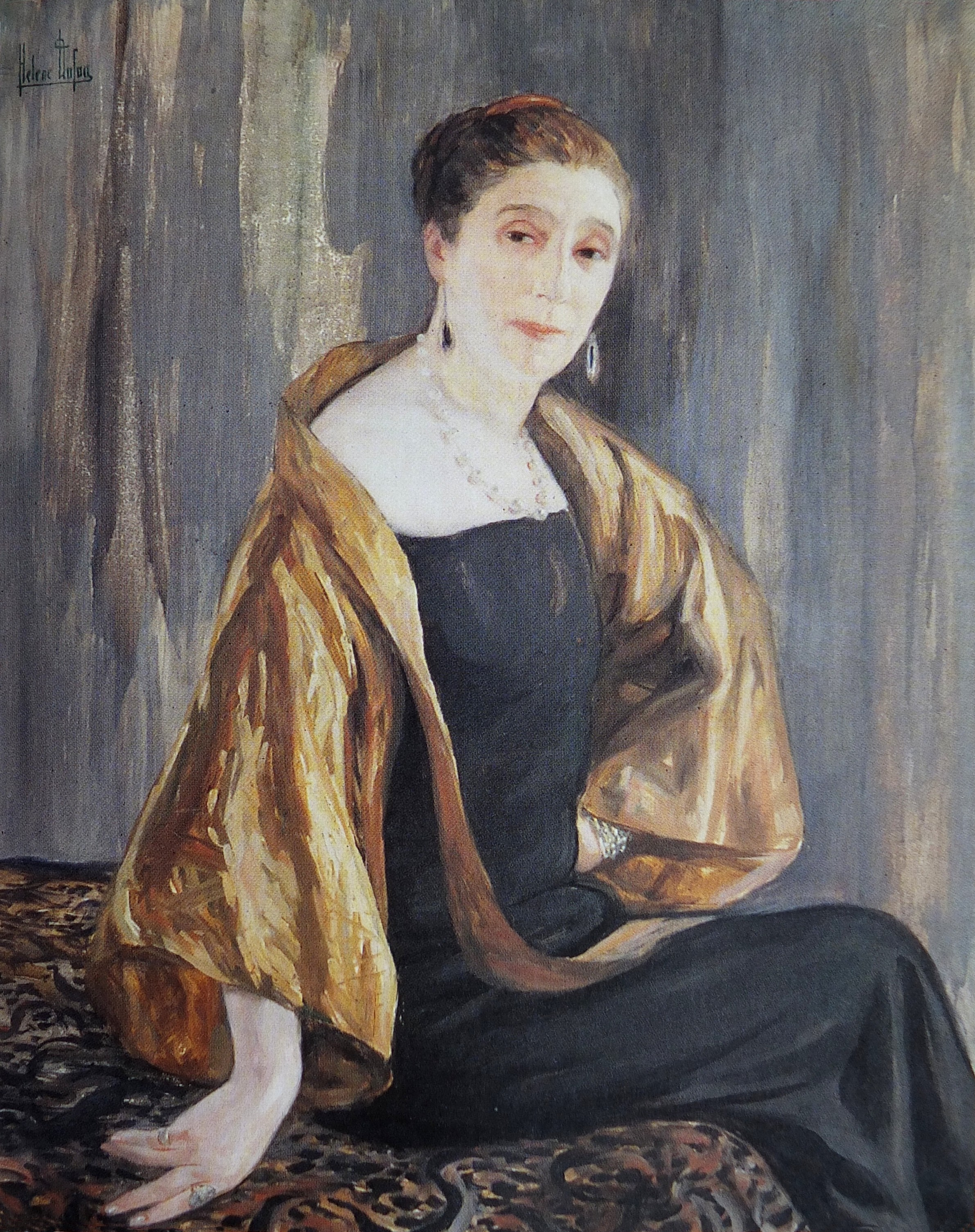
Portrait of Jeanne Lanvin, 1925

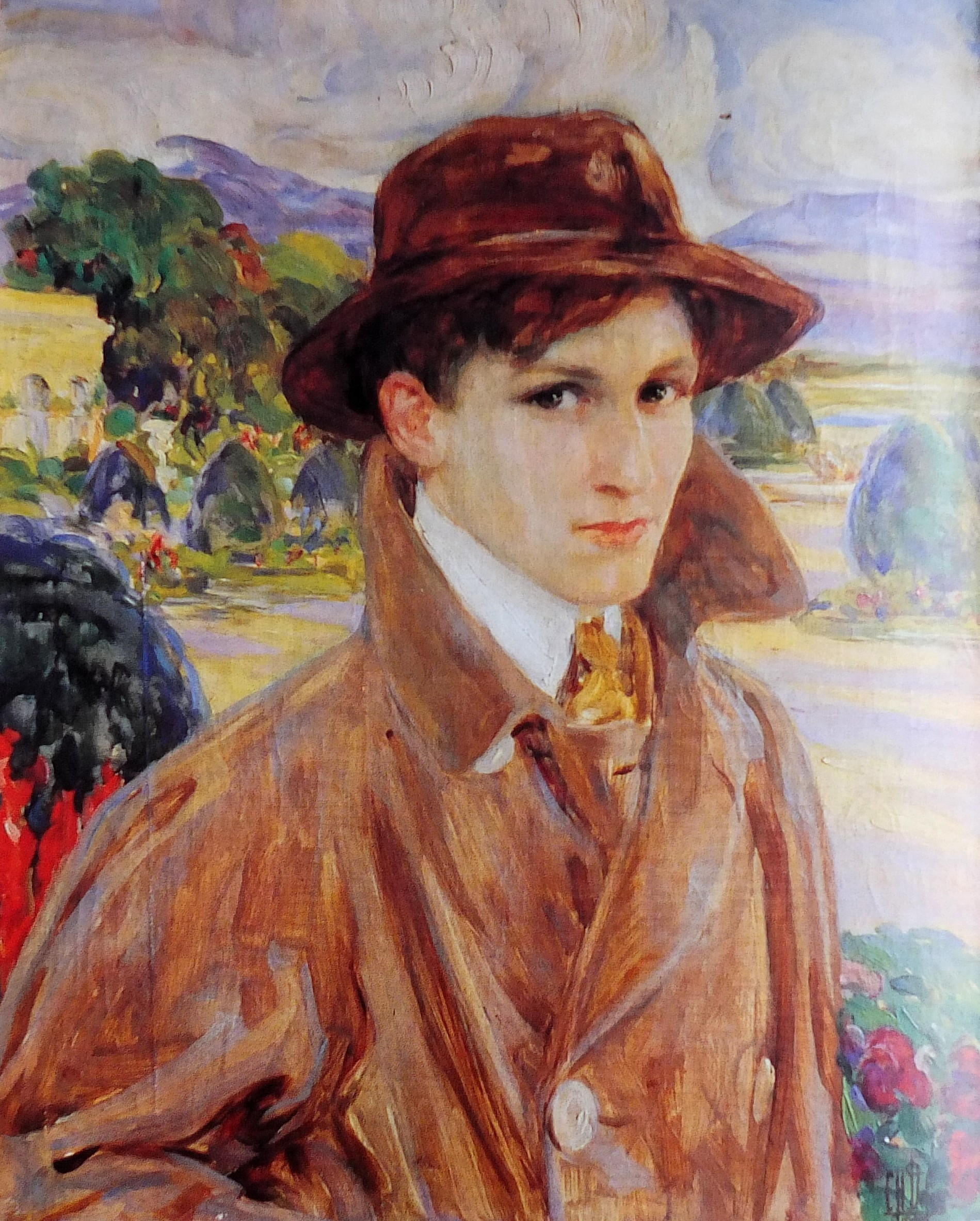
Portrait of Maurice Rostand, 1909

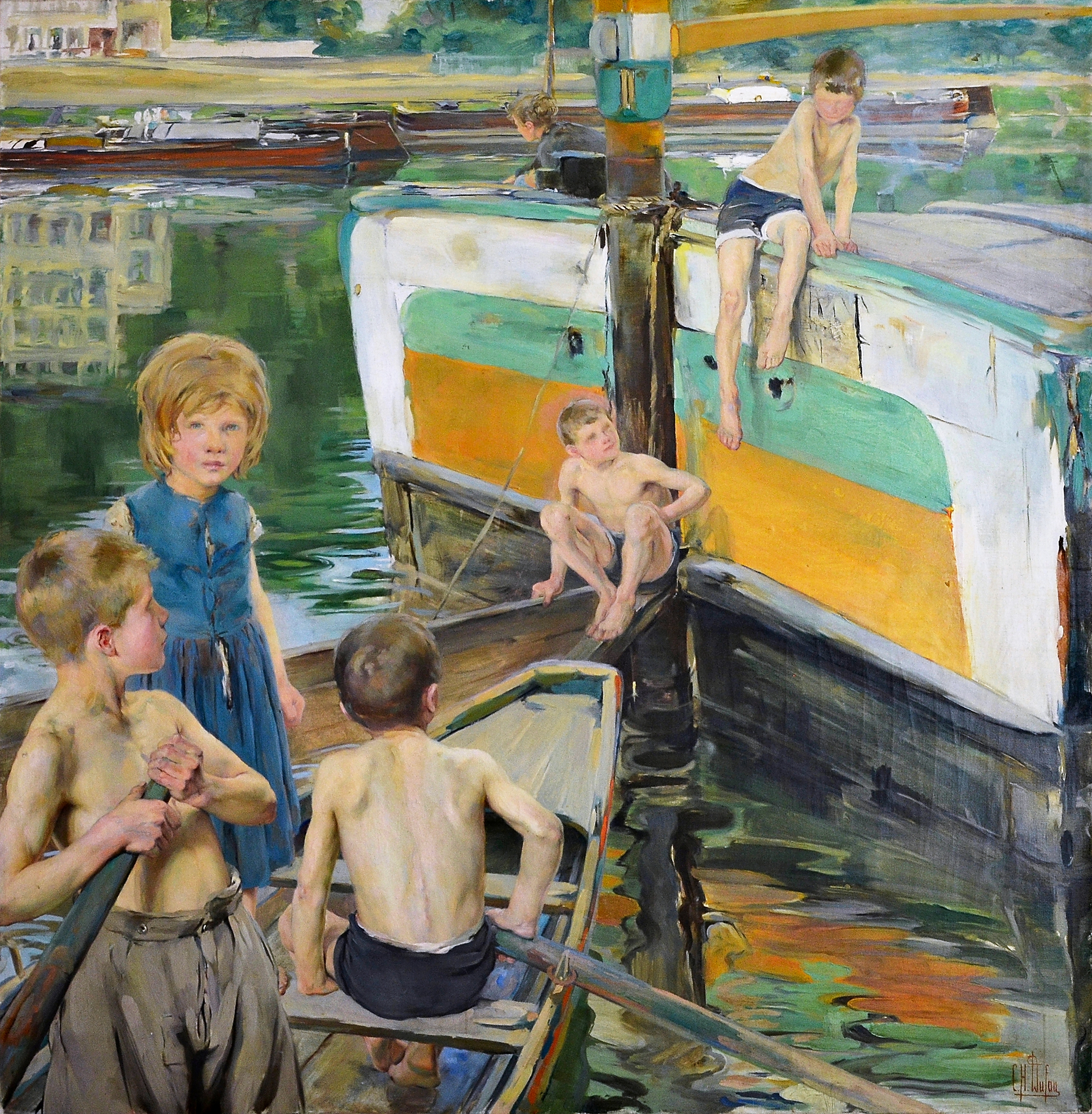
Bargemen's Children, 1898

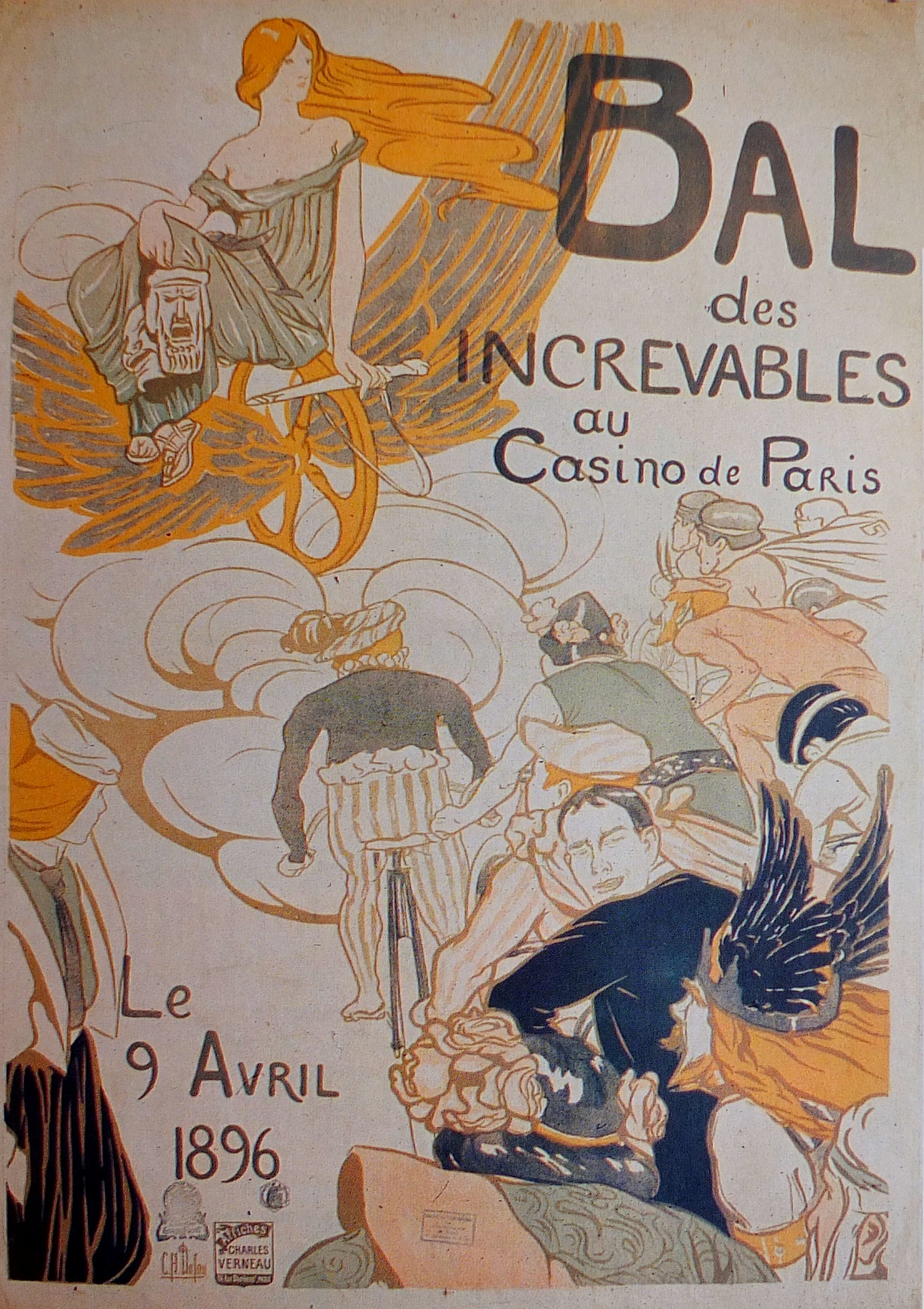
Poster for the Casino-de-Paris, 1896

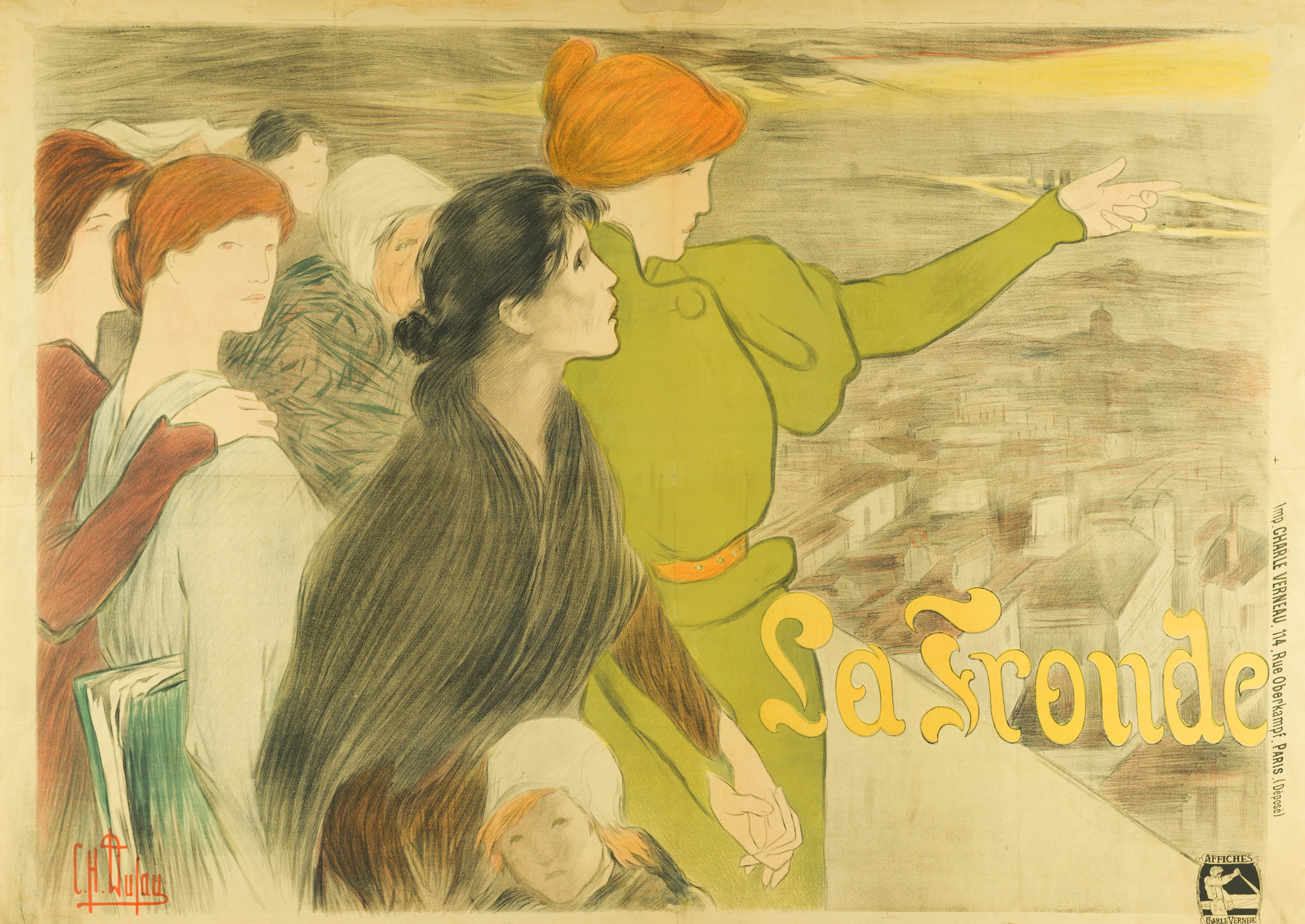
Advertising poster for "La Fronde", 1898

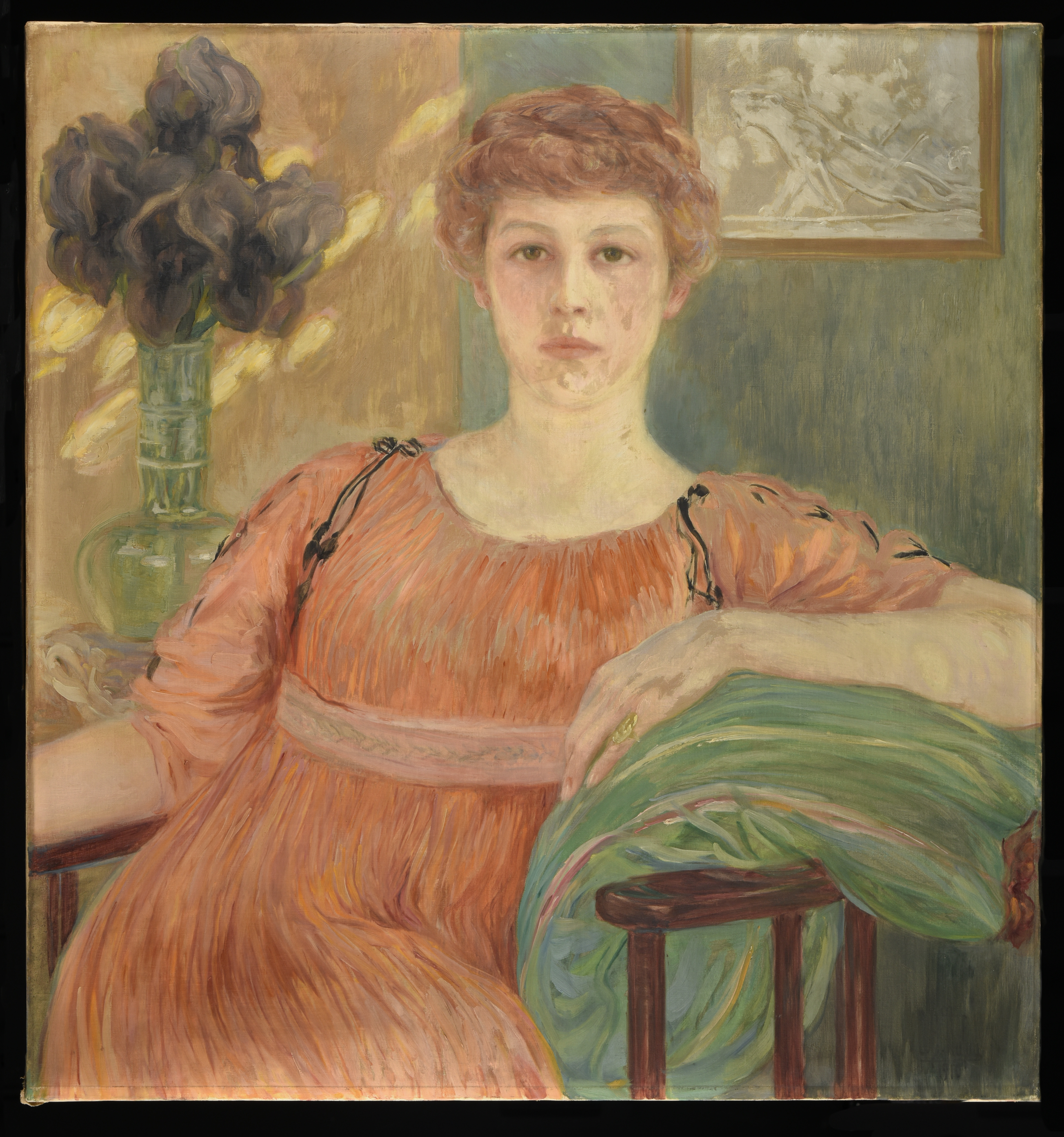
Madame Pol Neveu, 1910, Museum of Fine Arts, Reims

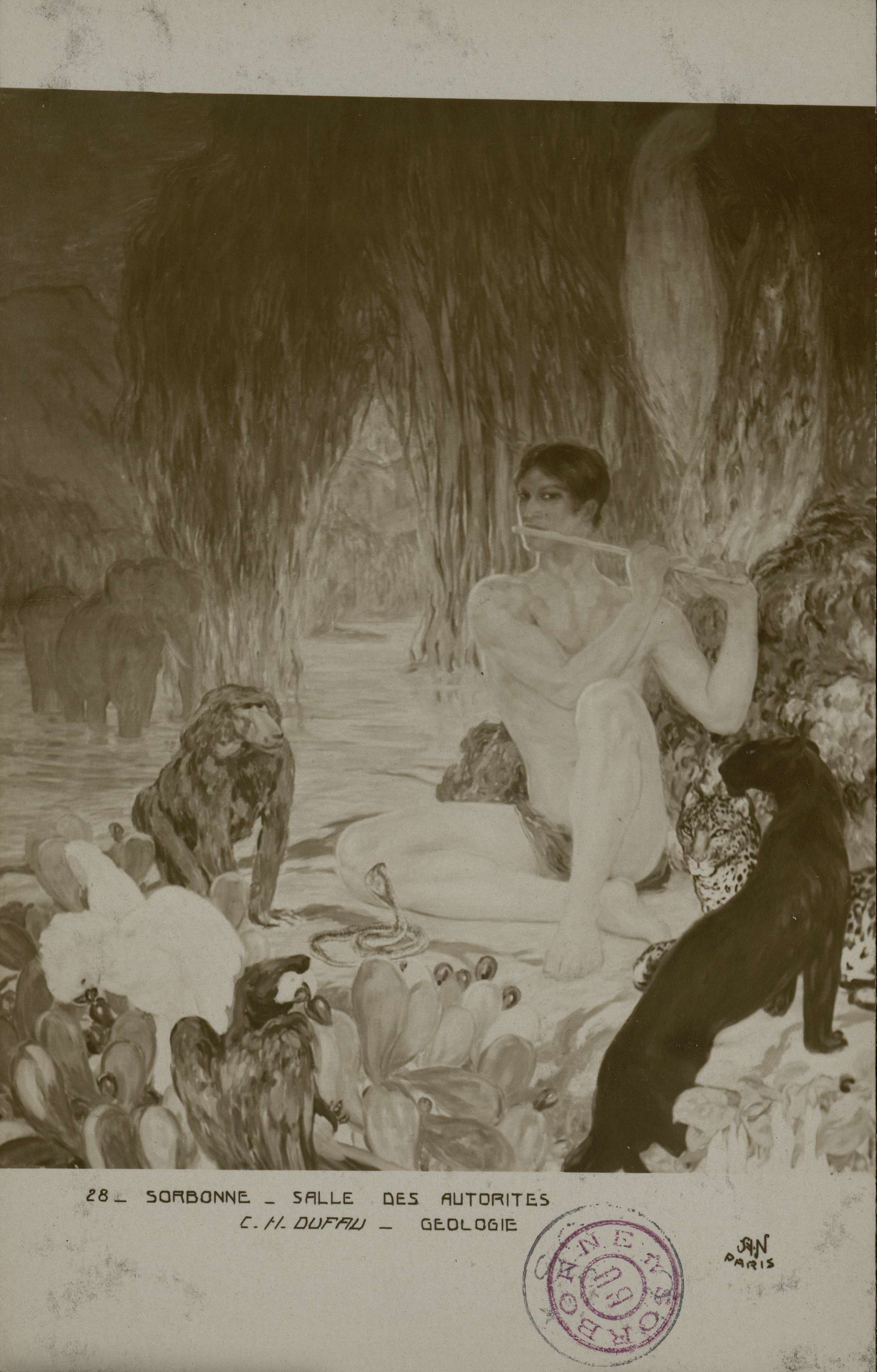
Postcard by Dufau

== Sources ==
- Elmar Stolpe: Dufau, Hélène. In: Allgemeines Künstlerlexikon. Die Bildenden Künstler aller Zeiten und Völker (AKL). Vol.30, Saur, Munich 2001, ISBN 3-598-22770-1, pgs.267–269.
- H. Vollmer: Dufau, Clémentine Hélène. In: Ulrich Thieme, Felix Becker, Allgemeines Lexikon der Bildenden Künstler von der Antike bis zur Gegenwart. Vol.10, E. A. Seemann, Leipzig 1914, pg.82–83.
