= Willy Tschopp =

Swiss sprinter

Personal information
- Nationality: Swiss
- Born: 3 September 1905
- Died: 5 November 1987 (aged 82)

Sport
- Sport: Sprinting
- Event: 100 metres

Willy Tschopp (3 September 1905 – 5 November 1987) was a Swiss sprinter. He competed in the men's 100 metres at the 1928 Summer Olympics.
