= Diane Foster =

Diane Foster may refer to:

- Diane Foster (sprinter)
- Diane Foster (curler)

== See also ==
- Dianne Foster, Canadian actress
