= Charley Borah =

American athlete

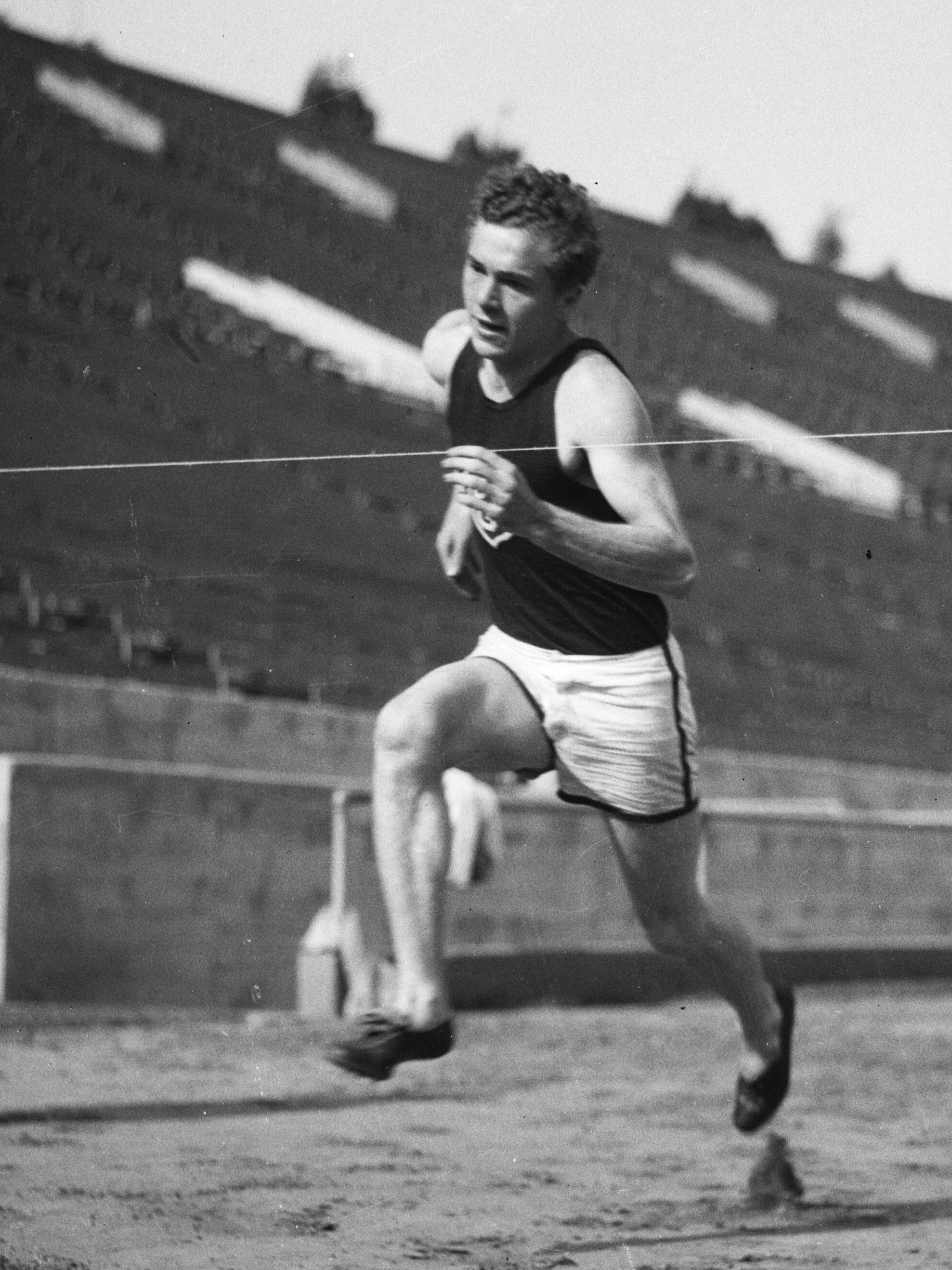
- Borah in 1928

Medal record

Men's athletics

Representing the United States

Olympic Games
Gold medal – first place	1928 Amsterdam	4 × 100 m relay

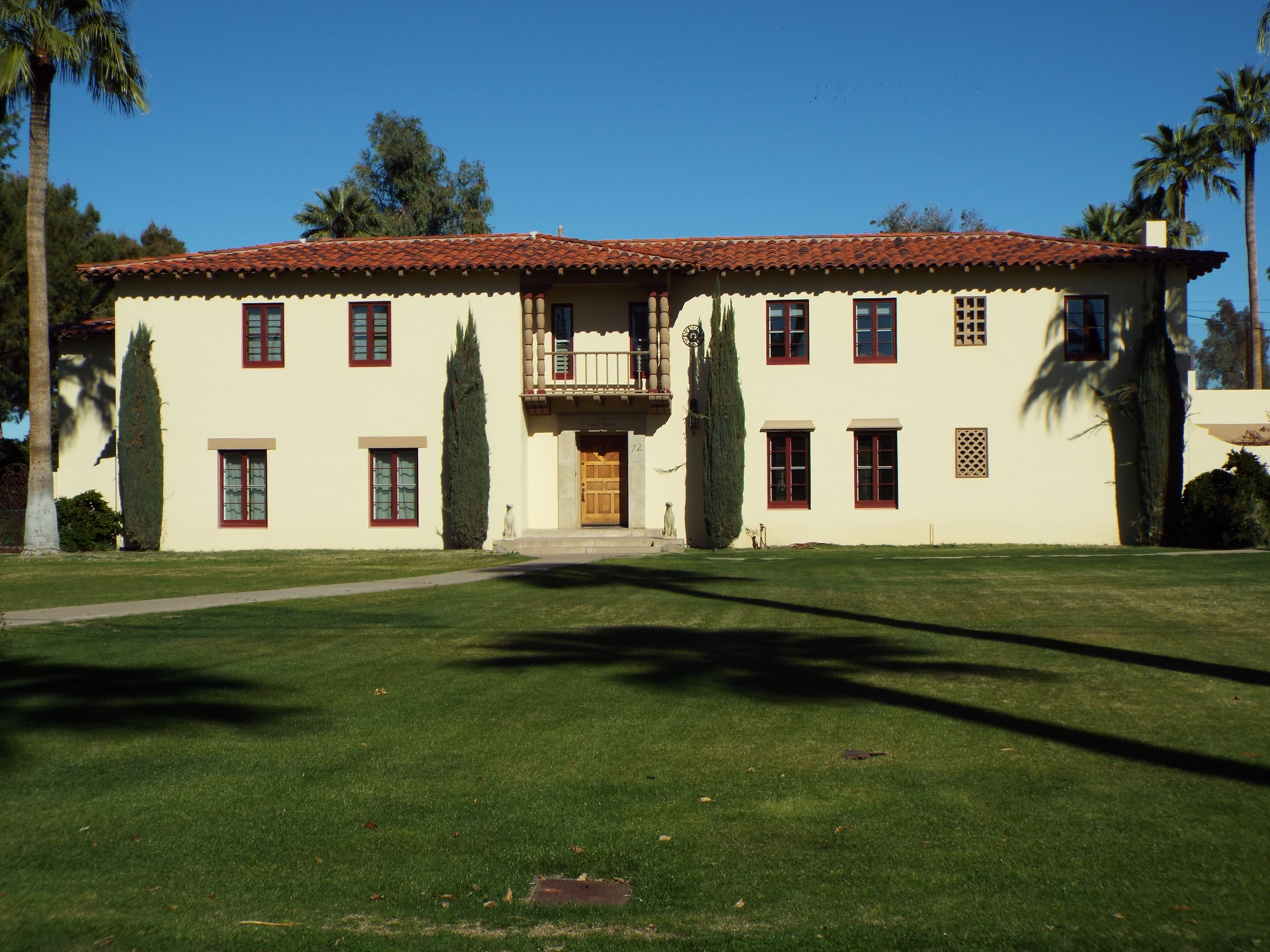
The Borah house in Phx, listed in the NRHP

Charles Edward Borah (November 11, 1905 – April 11, 1980) was an American athlete, winner of gold medal in the 4 × 100 m relay at the 1928 Summer Olympics.

A Phillips Academy, Andover graduate, Borah won the AAU championships in 100 yd in 1926, 220 yd in 1927, and 200 m in 1928. As a University of Southern California student, Borah won the IC4A championships in both 100 yd and 220 yd in 1927. He also equalled Charley Paddock's world record in 100 yd of 9.6 on two occasions, in 1926 and 1927. At the Amsterdam Olympics, Borah reached the quarterfinals in 100 m and ran the third leg in the American 4 × 100 m relay team, which equalled the world record of 41.0 in the final. He died in Phoenix, Arizona in 1980.
