= Georg Lammers =

German sprinter (1905–1987)

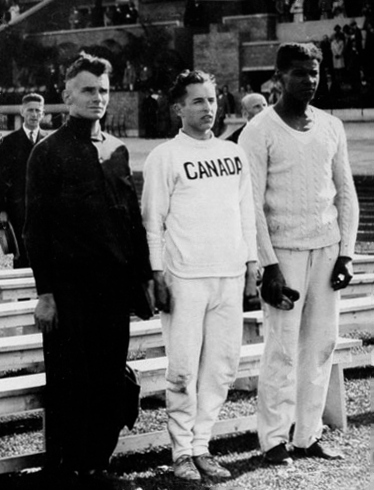
- Lammers (left) at the 1928 Olympics

Personal information
- Born: 14 April 1905 Burhave, German Empire
- Died: 17 March 1987 (aged 81) Butjadingen, West Germany
- Height: 178 cm (5 ft 10 in)
- Weight: 84 kg (185 lb)

Sport
- Sport: Athletics
- Events: 100 m, 200 m
- Club: PSV Berlin

Achievements and titles
- Personal bests: 100 m – 10.4 (1928); 200 m – 21.5 (1927)
Medal record
Representing Germany
Olympic Games
Silver medal – second place	1928 Amsterdam	4 × 100 m relay
Bronze medal – third place	1928 Amsterdam	100 m

Georg Lammers (14 April 1905 – 17 March 1987) was a German sprinter who competed at the 1928 Summer Olympics. He won a silver medal in the 4 × 100 m relay, together with Richard Corts, Hubert Houben and Helmut Körnig, and a bronze in the individual 100 m event.

During his career Lammers won eight national titles and set 13 world records. After retiring from competitions he worked as a bank clerk, then as a policeman and finally as a superintendent. He was one of the founders of the “Vereinigung alter Leichtathleten” (Association of Former Athletes) and of police sport in Germany after World War II. His daughter Senta competed in sprint at the national level.
