= Walter Rangeley =

English sprinter (1903–1982)

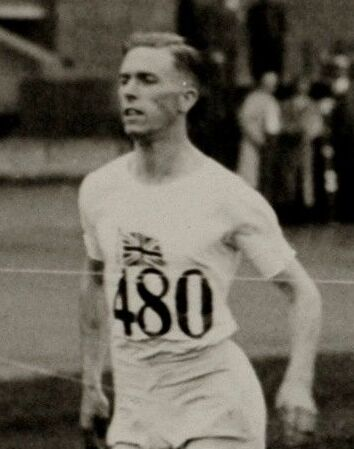

Personal information
- Nationality: British
- Born: 14 December 1903 Salford, England
- Died: 16 March 1982 (aged 78) Mold, Wales

Sport
- Sport: Athletics
- Event: Sprints
- Club: Salford Harriers
Medal record
Men's athletics
Representing Great Britain
Olympic Games
Silver medal – second place	1924 Paris	4×100 m relay
Silver medal – second place	1928 Amsterdam	200 m
Bronze medal – third place	1928 Amsterdam	4×100 m relay
Representing England
British Empire Games
Gold medal – first place	1934 London	4×110 yd relay
Bronze medal – third place	1934 London	220 yd

Walter Rangeley (14 December 1903 – 16 March 1982) was an English athlete who competed mainly in the sprints.

== Career ==
Rangeley was born in Salford. He competed for Great Britain in the 1924 Summer Olympics held in Paris, France, in the 4×100 metre relay where he won the silver medal with his teammates Harold Abrahams, Wilfred Nichol and Lancelot Royle. In the 100 metres event he was eliminated in the quarter-finals.

Rangeley finished third behind Loren Murchison in the 100 yards event at the 1925 AAA Championships.

At the Olympic Games in 1928 held in Amsterdam Rangeley won a silver medal in the 200 metres. He also joined with a new relay team consisting of teammates Cyril Gill, Edward Smouha and Jack London which won the bronze medal in the 4×100 metres competition. In the 100 metres event he was eliminated in the quarter-finals again.

After not participating in the 1932 Games his final Olympic appearance was in 1936 when he was a member of the British relay team which was eliminated in the first round of the 4×100 metre relay contest.

At the 1934 British Empire Games he won the bronze medal in the 220 yards event. He also won the gold medal with the English relay team in the 4×110 yards competition.

He died in Glyndŵr, Wales.
