= André Dufau =

French sprinter

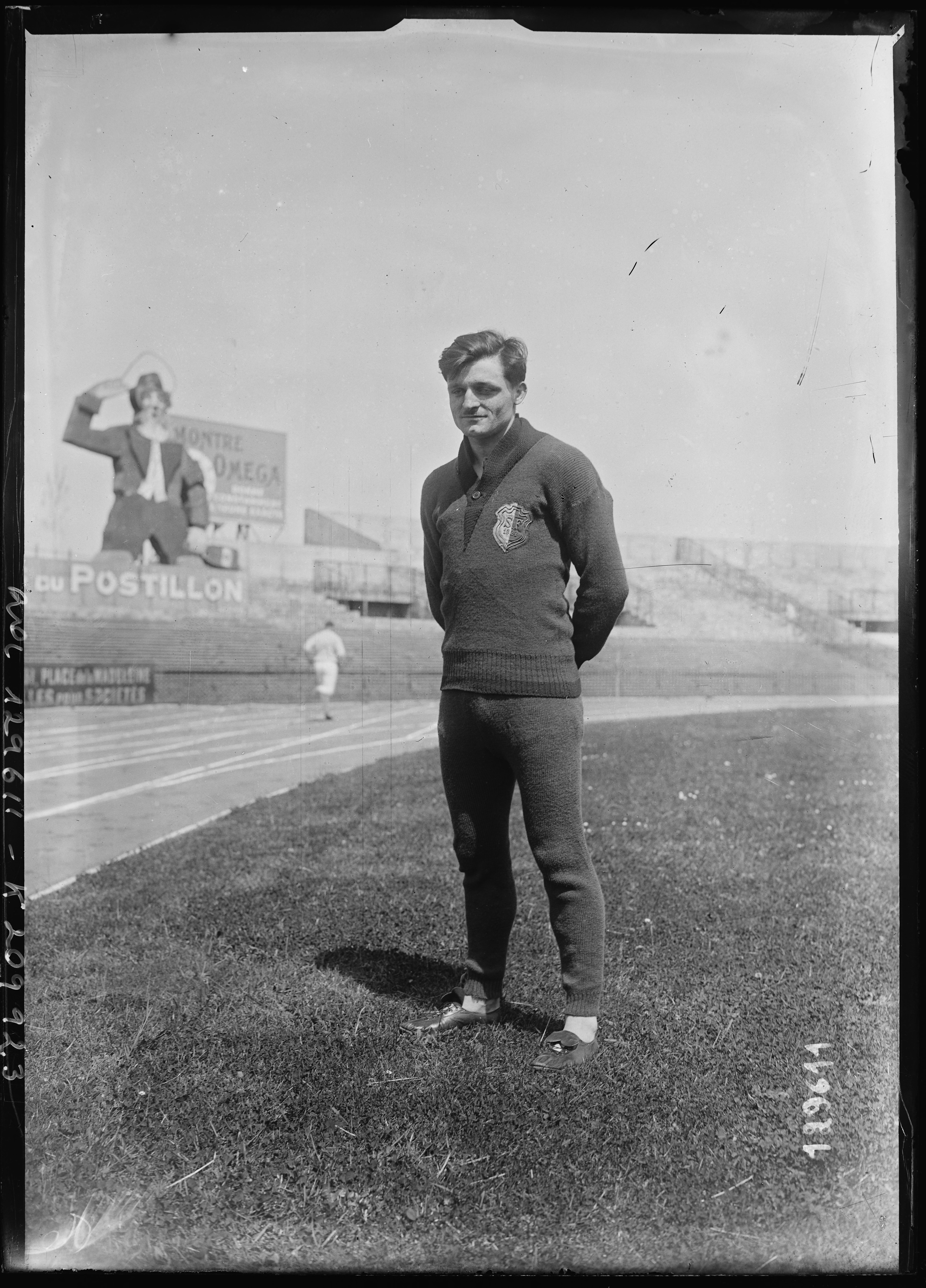

Personal information
- Born: 8 August 1905 Arras, France
- Died: 31 August 1990 (aged 85) Neuilly-sur-Seine, France

Sport
- Country: France
- Sport: Sprinting
- Event: 100 metres

André Dufau (8 August 1905 – 31 August 1990) was a French sprinter. He competed in the men's 100 metres at the 1928 Summer Olympics.
