= Jack London (athlete) =

British sprinter

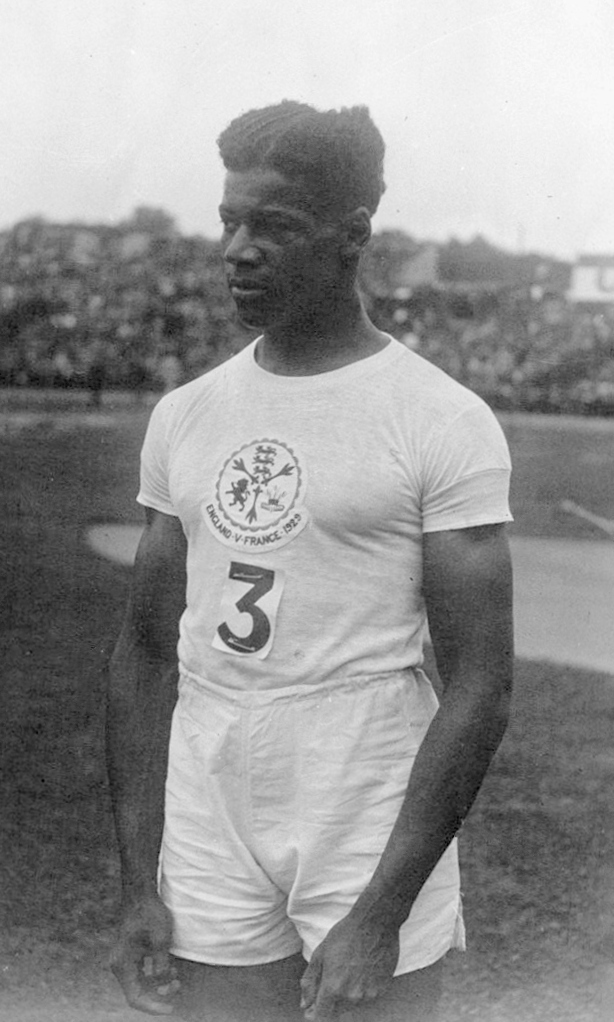
- Jack London in 1929

Personal information
- Born: 13 January 1905 Georgetown, British Guiana
- Died: 2 May 1966 (aged 61) London, England, United Kingdom
- Height: 1.83 m (6 ft 0 in)
- Weight: 75 kg (165 lb)

Sport
- Sport: Athletics
- Events: 100 m, 200 m, high jump
- Club: Polytechnic Harriers
- Coached by: Sam Mussabini, Albert Hill

Achievements and titles
- Personal bests: 100 m – 10.6 (1928); 200 m – 22.2 (1928); HJ – 1.88 m (1927)
Medal record
Representing Great Britain
Olympic Games
Silver medal – second place	1928 Amsterdam	100 metres
Bronze medal – third place	1928 Amsterdam	4×100 m relay

John Edward London (13 January 1905 – 2 May 1966) was a British athlete who competed mainly in the 100 metres. Born in British Guiana, now Guyana, he won a silver and a bronze medal at the 1928 Summer Olympics in Amsterdam. He was the second Black British Olympian to win a medal for Great Britain (after Harry Edward, at the 1920 Antwerp Olympics), and the third to represent Great Britain at the Olympics (the first being wrestler Louis Bruce).

== Early life ==
London was born in Demerara, British Guiana (now Guyana). His father was John Edward London who worked as a school teacher and church minister and later as a medical practitioner. His mother was named Beatrice Annie. They moved to England where John Edward London Snr. was studying medicine. He later returned to British Guiana to practice, while Beatrice and John Edward Jnr. remained in England. They lived with Beatrice's sister in Newcastle-upon-Tyne, at Lily Crescent, in the Jesmond area of the city. When John Edward Snr. died in 1922 London was living in Birmingham, and later moved to London.

== Sporting career ==
In London studied at the Regent Street Polytechnic, where he joined the Polytechnic Harriers and was coached by Sam Mussabini. He was elected captain of the sports club in October 1922. He was an early adopter of starting blocks rather than digging footholds in the cinder tracks. He ran the 100 metres in 10.7 seconds to win the race at a competition between England and France at Stamford Bridge in July 1927, and then won both the 100 metres and the 200 metres at a competition in Paris in October 1927.

London competed for Great Britain in the 1928 Summer Olympics held in Amsterdam, Netherlands. After equalling the Olympic 100 metres record of 10.6 seconds in the semi-final, he won the silver medal in the 100 metres final, behind Canadian Percy Williams. He then won the bronze medal in the 4×100 metres relay with his teammates Cyril Gill, Edward Smouha and Walter Rangeley, behind the teams of the US and Germany. He was awarded the Polytechnic Harriers's S. A. Mussabini memorial medal (Mussabini having died in 1927) and the Studd Trophy in 1928.

He was later coached by Albert Hill. In July 1929, he became the first British sprinter to win the Amateur Athletic Association's 100 yards title since Harold Abrahams in 1924 and was also awarded the Prince Hassan Pacha 100 yards Challenge Cup. As well as competing as a sprinter he was also a leading British high jumper in this period. His athletic career was curtailed by a leg injury in 1930. He joined a 4×100 metre relay for England against Germany in 1931, but was not selected for the 1932 Summer Olympics in Los Angeles.

== Post-sporting life ==
After he retired from athletics, he became an entertainer, playing piano in the original cast of the Noël Coward's musical Cavalcade at the Theatre Royal, Drury Lane in 1931. He also appeared in Will Hay's Gainsborough Pictures comedy Old Bones of the River in 1938 playing the character of M'Bapi.

He married Joyce Bonita at Marylebone register office in 1930, where his profession was recorded as "pianist". He was later divorced and remarried in 1938 to Agnes Downham.

With athletics journalist Joe Binks, he co-wrote an athletics coaching manual in 1948, The Way to Win on Track and Field, but the book was not a commercial success.

He later worked as a porter at St Pancras Hospital, and died suddenly from a subarachnoid haemorrhage.
