= Helmut Körnig =

German sprinter (1905–1972)

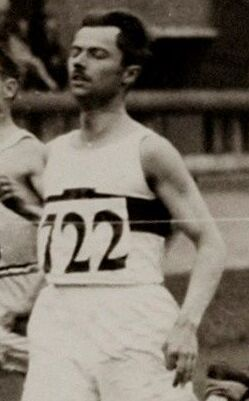
- Körnig at the 1928 Olympics

Personal information
- Born: 12 September 1905 Glogau, German Empire
- Died: 5 March 1972 (aged 66) Dortmund, West Germany
- Height: 175 cm (5 ft 9 in)
- Weight: 66 kg (146 lb)

Sport
- Sport: Athletics
- Events: 100 m, 200 m
- Club: SC Charlottenburg, Berlin

Achievements and titles
- Personal bests: 100 m – 10.4 (1926); 200 m – 20.9 (1932)
Medal record
Representing Germany
Olympic Games
Silver medal – second place	1928 Amsterdam	4 × 100 m relay
Bronze medal – third place	1928 Amsterdam	200 metres
Silver medal – second place	1932 Los Angeles	4 × 100 m relay

Helmut Körnig (12 September 1905 – 5 March 1972) was a German sprinter who competed at the 1928 and 1932 Summer Olympics. He won an individual bronze medal in the 200 m in 1928 and two team medals in the 4 × 100 m relay at both Olympics.

== Biography ==
Körnig won national titles in the 100 m (1926, 1927 and 1930), 200 m (1926–28 and 1930), and 4 × 100 m relay (1927 and 1929–30). He set 16 indoor and 14 outdoor world records. Körnig won the British AAA Championships title in the 100 yards event at the 1927 AAA Championships. A typhoid fever ended his career in early 1934.

Körnig finished second behind Wilfred Legg in the 100 yards and second behind Friedrich-Wilhelm Wichmann in the 220 yards at the British 1928 AAA Championships. Shortly afterwards he represented Germany at the 1928 Olympic Games in Amsterdam, Netherlands.

Körnig had a degree in law and worked as a journalist for Berliner Tageblatt and as an assistant director for the German film company Universum Film AG. After World War II he headed the film, radio and picture division of the Federal Executive Committee of the Federation of German Trade Unions DGB in Düsseldorf. In the 1950s he became the manager of the Westfalenhallen venue in Dortmund. He initiated construction of an indoor athletic hall in the Westphalia Park, which was named Helmut Körnig Hall after his death in 1973.
