= 1928 Weltklasse Zürich =

- Organisers: FC Zürich (Athletic section)
- Edition: 1st
- Date: 12 August 1928
- Host city: Zürich, Switzerland
- Venue: Letzigrund
- Level: Senior
- Type: Outdoor track and field

The 1928 Weltklasse Zürich (Original: Internationales Leichtathletik-Meeting in Zürich) was an outdoor track and field meeting in Zürich, Switzerland.

== Results international ==
=== 100 m international ===
==== Heat 1 ====
Place	Athlete	Nation	Club	Time	Notes
1	Jakob Schüller	Germany	Krefeld	10.9	Q
2	Rud. Mägli	Switzerland	FC Grenchen	11.0	Q
3	Enrico Torre	Italy	Firenze		
4	Alfred Sutter	Switzerland	FC Zürich		

==== Heat 2 ====
Place	Athlete	Nation	Club	Time	Notes
1	Rudi Dobermann	Germany	Köln	11.0	Q
2	Emmanuel Goldsmith	Switzerland	FC Zürich	11.2	Q
3	Silvio Cator	Haiti			
4	Carl Sautter	Switzerland	St. Gallen		

==== Final ====
Place	Athlete	Nation	Club	Time	Notes
1st place, gold medalist(s)	Jakob Schüller	Germany	Krefeld	10.8 MR	
2nd place, silver medalist(s)	Rudi Dobermann	Germany	Köln	11.2	
3rd place, bronze medalist(s)	Rud. Mägli	Switzerland	FC Grenchen		
4	Emmanuel Goldsmith	Switzerland	FC Zürich		
5	Adolf Meier	Switzerland	FC Zürich		

=== 200 m international ===
Place	Athlete	Nation	Club	Time	Notes
1st place, gold medalist(s)	Jakob Schüller	Germany	Krefeld	22.4 MR	
2nd place, silver medalist(s)	Carl Sautter	Switzerland	St. Gallen	23.0	
3rd place, bronze medalist(s)	Willy Weibel	Switzerland	FC Zürich		
4	Moritz Straub	Switzerland	FC Zürich		

=== 400 m international ===
Place	Athlete	Nation	Club	Time	Notes
1st place, gold medalist(s)	Ettore Tavernari	Italy	Modena	49.9 MR	
2nd place, silver medalist(s)	W. Goldfarb	Switzerland	GG Bern (DE)	50.3	
3rd place, bronze medalist(s)	Josef Imbach	Switzerland	Genf	50.4	
4	F Rammelmeyer	Switzerland	GG Bern (DE)		

=== 800 m international ===
Place	Athlete	Nation	Club	Time	Notes
1st place, gold medalist(s)	Ettore Tavernari	Italy	Modena	1:59 MR	
2nd place, silver medalist(s)	W. Goldfarb	Switzerland	GG Bern (DE)	2:01.7	
3rd place, bronze medalist(s)	Emil Zaugg	Switzerland	FC Zürich	2:01.7	
4	Max Rüegg	Switzerland	FC Zürich		
5	Attinger	Switzerland	Affoltern		
6	Severin Meier	Switzerland	Baden		
DNS	Adriaan Paulen	Netherlands			

=== 5000 m international ===
Place	Athlete	Nation	Club	Time	Notes
1st place, gold medalist(s)	Paavo Nurmi	Finland	Abo	15:18.3 MR	
2nd place, silver medalist(s)	H. Wehrli	Switzerland	Küttigen	15:45.6	300 m Handicap
3rd place, bronze medalist(s)	A. Amrein	Switzerland	Luzern	15:35.2	250 m Handicap
4	Willi Boltze	Germany	Hamburg	15:45.6	
5	G Nydegger	Switzerland	Lausanne		250 m Handicap
?	Schäfer				250 m Handicap
?	Gaschen				250 m Handicap
?	Ries				250 m Handicap
?	Widmer				300 m Handicap

=== 4×100 m international ===
Place	Mannschaft	Athleten	Nation	Time	Notes
1st place, gold medalist(s)	International	Schneider; Enrico Torre; Jakob Schüller; Rudi Dobermann	Switzerland; Italy; Germany; Germany	43.2 MR	
2nd place, silver medalist(s)	FC Zürich I (Olympic Swiss team)	Emmanuel Goldsmith; Willy Weibel; Adolf Meier; Sutter	Switzerland	43.4	
3rd place, bronze medalist(s)	Switzerland	R Mägli; K. Sautter; Rammelmeyer; Josef Imbach	Switzerland		
4	FC Zürich II		Switzerland		

=== Longjump international ===
Place	Athlete	Nation	Club	Mark	Notes
1st place, gold medalist(s)	Silvio Cator	Haiti		7.37 m MR	
2nd place, silver medalist(s)	Rudi Dobermann	Germany	Köln	7.04 m	
3rd place, bronze medalist(s)	Adolf Meier	Switzerland	FC Zürich	6.69 m	
4	Sutter	Switzerland	FC Zürich	6.82 m	
5	Plüss	Switzerland	Gretzenbach	6.73 m	
6	Enrico Torre	Italy	Firenze	6.66 m	

=== Discus throw international ===
Place	Athlete	Nation	Club	Mark	Notes
1st place, gold medalist(s)	Albino Pighi	Italy	Verona	43.90 m MR	
2nd place, silver medalist(s)	Werner Nüesch	Switzerland	FC Zürich	38.16 m	
3rd place, bronze medalist(s)	A. Villinger	Germany	Waldshut	36.14 m	
4	Ad Schacke	Switzerland	FC Zürich	34.60 m	
DNS	Ernst Paulus	Germany			injured

=== Shot put international ===
Place	Athlete	Nation	Club	Mark	Notes
1st place, gold medalist(s)	Albino Pighi	Italy	Verona	13.64 m MR	
2nd place, silver medalist(s)	A. Villinger	Germany	Waldshut	13.30 m	
3rd place, bronze medalist(s)	Werner Nüesch	Switzerland	FC Zürich	12.94 m	
4	Adolf Meier	Switzerland	FC Zürich	11.30 m	

== Results national ==
=== 100 m-Final national ===
==== Preliminary heat 1 ====
Place	Athlete	Club	Time	Notes
1	W Hahn	Oerlikon	11.5	Q
2	H Brugger	Oerlikon	12.0	Q
3	K Humbel	Flawil		

==== Preliminary heat 2 ====
Place	Athlete	Club	Time	Notes
1	Konrad Zander	FC Young Fellows Zurich	11.8	Q
2	Werner Job	Birmensdorf	12.0	Q

==== Preliminary heat 3 ====
Place	Athlete	Club	Time	Notes
1	Moritz Straub	FC Zürich	11.8	Q
2	Walter Dischler	FC Zürich	12.0	Q
3	Moritz Epstein	FC Young Fellows Zurich		

==== Intermediate heat 1 ====
Place	Athlete	Club	Time	Notes
1	W Hahn	Oerlikon	11.5	Q
2	Konrad Zander	FC Young Fellows Zurich	11.7	Q
3	Walter Dischler	FC Zürich	12.1	

==== Intermediate heat 2 ====
Place	Athlete	Club	Time	Notes
1	H Brugger	Oerlikon	11.5	Q
2	Moritz Straub	FC Zürich		Q
3	Werner Job	Birmensdorf		Q

==== Final ====
Place	Athlete	Club	Time	Notes
1st place, gold medalist(s)	Moritz Straub	FC Zürich	11.4	
2nd place, silver medalist(s)	Konrad Zander	FC Young Fellows Zurich	11.7	
3rd place, bronze medalist(s)	W Hahn	Oerlikon		
4	H Brugger	Oerlikon		
5	Werner Job	Birmensdorf		

=== 200 m-Final national ===
Place	Athlete	Club	Time	Notes
1st place, gold medalist(s)	W. Goldfarb	GG Bern (DE)	22.8	
2nd place, silver medalist(s)	Hans Niggli	FC Zürich	23.6	
3rd place, bronze medalist(s)	Konrad Zander	FC Young Fellows Zurich		
4	Alfred Krieg	FC Young Fellows Zurich		

=== 400 m-Final national ===
==== Preliminary heat 1 ====
Place	Athlete	Club	Time	Notes
1	Max Rüegg	FC Zürich	54.8	Q
2	Zollinger		54.9	Q
3	E Sahli	FC Blue Stars Zürich		

==== Preliminary heat 2 ====
Place	Athlete	Club	Time	Notes
1	Herman Zulauf	Horgen	55.0	Q
2	Emil Ammann	FC Zürich	55.4	Q
3	Kaspar Humbel	Flawil	DNF	

==== Final ====
Place	Athlete	Club	Time	Notes
1st place, gold medalist(s)	Herman Zulauf	Horgen	53.8	
2nd place, silver medalist(s)	Emil Ammann	FC Zürich	54.0	
3rd place, bronze medalist(s)	Max Rüegg	FC Zürich		
4	Zollinger			

=== 1500 m national ===
Place	Athlete	Club	Delay	Notes
1st place, gold medalist(s)	Emil Zaugg	FC Zürich	4:22.4	
2nd place, silver medalist(s)	Max Stahel	FC Zürich	4:29.0	
3rd place, bronze medalist(s)	Severin Meier	Baden	4:37.5	
4	Max Reisdorf	FC Zürich	4:38.4	
5	Attinger	Affoltern		

=== 5000 m national ===
Place	Athlete	Club	Delay	Notes
1st place, gold medalist(s)	Hans Wehrli	Küttigen	16:36.6	
2nd place, silver medalist(s)	Werner Kohler	Küttigen	17:14.0	
3rd place, bronze medalist(s)	Henri Jaton	FC Young Fellows Zurich	17:39.2	
4	B Leonhard	Oerlikon	17:39.2	
5	Hans Schweiger	FC Blue Stars Zürich	17:50.8	
6	Gustav Keiser	FC Zürich	17:52.5	

=== 400 m hurdles national ===
Place	Athlete	Club	Time	Notes
1st place, gold medalist(s)	Schneider	FC Biel	56.4 NR/MR	
2nd place, silver medalist(s)	Herman Zulauf	Horgen	60.7	
3rd place, bronze medalist(s)	Ferdinand Stingelin	FC Zürich		
4	Stauber	BSC Old Boys		

=== Long jump national ===
Place	Athlete	Club	Mark	Notes
1st place, gold medalist(s)	H Brugger	Oerlikon	6.48 m	
2nd place, silver medalist(s)	E Kaiser	FC Blue Stars Zürich	6.25 m	
3rd place, bronze medalist(s)	K Humbel	Flawil	6.05 m	
4	H Doelker	FC Young Fellows Zurich	5.93 m	
5	E Rihs	Züricher Sportclub	5.90 m	

=== High jump national ===
Place	Athlete	Club	Mark	Notes
1st place, gold medalist(s)	Stauber	BSC Old Boys	1.75 m	
2nd place, silver medalist(s)	Hans Rütschi	Basel	1.725 m	
3rd place, bronze medalist(s)	A Weilenmann	Basel	1.70 m	

=== Discus throw national ===
Place	Athlete	Club	Mark	Notes
1st place, gold medalist(s)	A Schacke	FC Zürich	35.40 m	
2nd place, silver medalist(s)	E Kaiser	FC Blue Stars Zürich	34.15 m	
3rd place, bronze medalist(s)	Gottlieb Binder	FC Zürich	31.90 m	
4	Ad Rysler	FC Young Fellows Zurich	28.35 m	

=== Javelin throw national ===
==== Preliminary ====
Place	Athlete	Club	Time	Notes
1	J Würth	TV Steinach	51.26 m	Q
2	Ad Schacke	FC Zürich	48.73 m	Q
3	Leonh. Leonhard	Winterthur	48.13 m	Q
4	A Fegblé	FC Young Fellows Zurich	41.27 m	
5	A Weilenmann	Basel	40.85 m	
6	Gottlieb Binder	FC Zurich	39.70 m	

==== Final ====
Place	Athlete	Club	Mark	Notes
1st place, gold medalist(s)	J Würth	TV Steinach	54.77 m	
2nd place, silver medalist(s)	Ad Schacke	FC Zürich	49.30 m	
3rd place, bronze medalist(s)	L Leonhard	Winterthur	49.09 m	
4	A Villinger	(Germany) Waldshut	46.90 m	
