= Athletics at the 1928 Summer Olympics – Men's long jump =

Men's long jump at the Games of the IX Olympiad
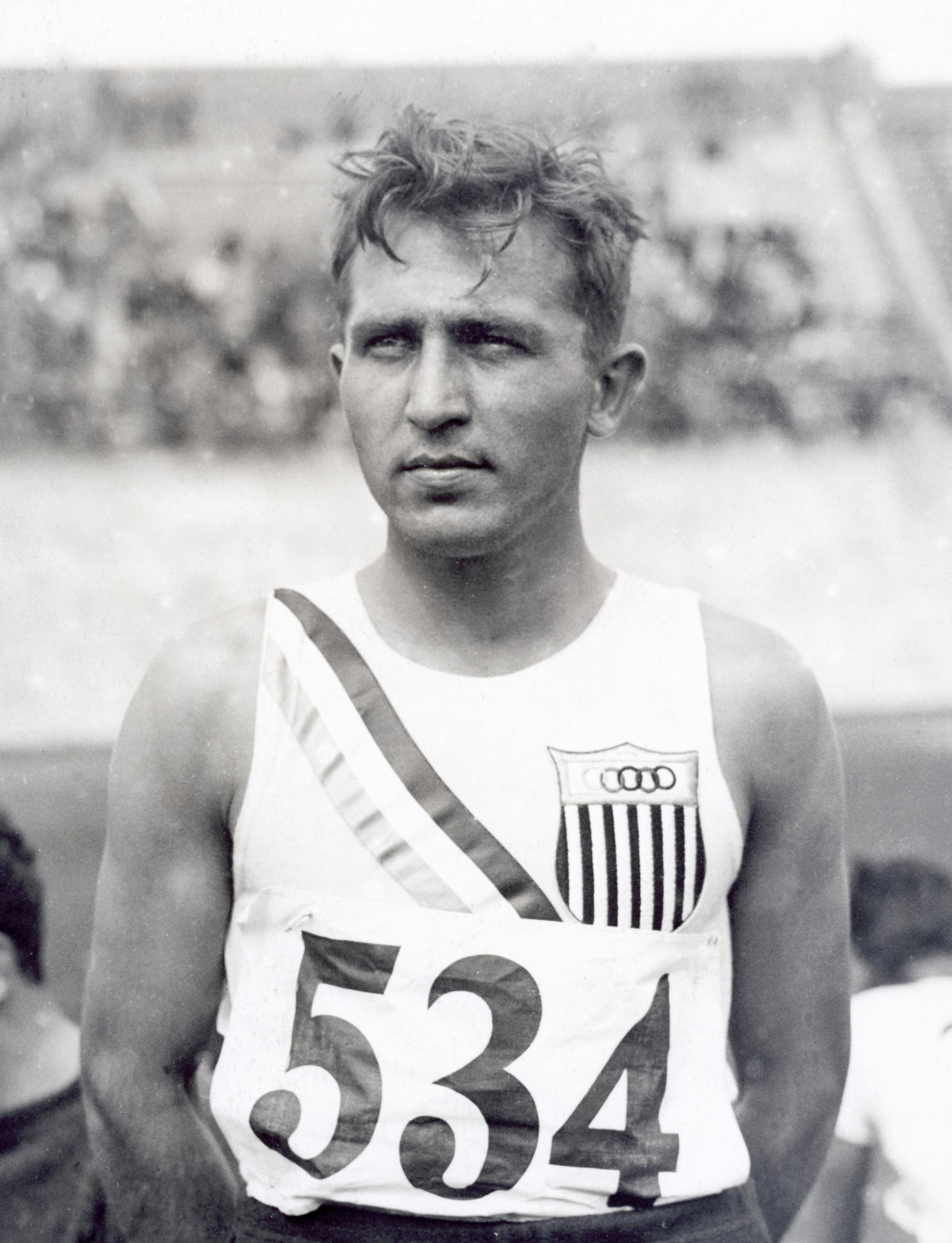
- Ed Hamm in July 1928
- Venue: Olympic Stadium
- Date: July 31, 1928
- Competitors: 41 from 23 nations
- Winning distance: 7.73

Medalists
1st place, gold medalist(s)		Ed Hamm; United States
2nd place, silver medalist(s)		Silvio Cator; Haiti
3rd place, bronze medalist(s)		Al Bates; United States

The men's long jump event was part of the track and field athletics programme at the 1928 Summer Olympics. The competition was held on Tuesday, July 31, 1928. Forty-one long jumpers from 23 nations competed. The maximum number of athletes per nation was 4. The event was won by Ed Hamm of the United States, the nation's second consecutive and seventh overall victory in the event. Silvio Cator earned Haiti's first medal in the event by taking silver.

== Background ==
This was the eighth appearance of the event, which is one of 12 athletics events to have been held at every Summer Olympics. The returning finalists from the 1924 Games were the defending champion, DeHart Hubbard of the United States, and fourth-place finisher Vilho Tuulos of Finland. Hubbard had an ankle injury, however. Ed Hamm had set the world record at the 1928 AAU championship and was the "heavy favorite."

Chile, Denmark, Ireland, South Africa, and Spain each made their first appearance in the event. The United States appeared for the eighth time, the only nation to have long jumpers at each of the Games thus far.

== Competition format ==
The 1928 format continued to use the two-round format used in 1900 and since 1908, with the six-man finals introduced in 1920. Instead of having ties all advance (as in 1924), the next-best jump was used to break ties. Each jumper had three jumps in the qualifying round; finalists received an additional three jumps, with qualifying round jumps still counting if the final jumps were not better.

== Records ==
These were the standing world and Olympic records (in metres) prior to the 1928 Summer Olympics.

World record	Ed Hamm (USA)	7.90	Cambridge, United Kingdom	7 July 1928
Olympic record	Robert LeGendre (USA)	7.765(*)	Paris, France	7 July 1924

(*) Robert LeGendre set the Olympic record in the 1924 pentathlon contest

== Schedule ==
Date	Time	Round
Tuesday, 21 July 1928		Qualifying; Final

== Results ==
The best six long jumpers qualified for the final. Two jumpers, Hannes de Boer and Ed Gordon, tied for sixth place, but only de Boer advanced to the final as his second best jump (6.96) was better than the second best jump of Gordon (6.57). The jumping order is not available and the jumping series are only available for the best six jumpers. The final was held on the same day and started at 2 p.m. No jumper was able to improve his qualification width.

Rank	Group	Athlete	Nation	Qualification				Final			
Rank	Group	Athlete	Nation	1	2	3	Result	4	5	6	Result
1st place, gold medalist(s)	1	Ed Hamm	United States	?	7.73	7.68	7.73	7.68	7.66	—	7.73
2nd place, silver medalist(s)	1	Silvio Cator	Haiti	X	7.50	7.58	7.58	7.20	7.22	X	7.58
3rd place, bronze medalist(s)	2	Al Bates	United States	7.40	X	X	7.40	6.79	6.92	6.75	7.40
4	2	Willi Meier	Germany	7.35	7.39	7.05	7.39	X	7.27	7.23	7.39
5	1	Erich Köchermann	Germany	7.35	7.16	7.25	7.35	7.05	X	6.85	7.35
6	4	Hannes de Boer	Netherlands	7.32 / 6.96			7.32	X	X	X	7.32
7	3	Ed Gordon	United States	7.32 / 6.57			7.32	did not advance			
8	3	Eric Svensson	Sweden	?	?	?	7.29	did not advance			
9	4	Chūhei Nambu	Japan	?	?	?	7.25	did not advance			
10	2	Olle Hallberg	Sweden	?	?	?	7.18	did not advance			
11	4	DeHart Hubbard	United States	?	?	?	7.11	did not advance			
11	3	Mikio Oda	Japan	?	?	?	7.11	did not advance			
11	4	Ville Tuulos	Finland	?	?	?	7.11	did not advance			
14	1	Erling Aastad	Norway	?	?	?	7.07	did not advance			
15	3	Helmut Schlöske	Germany	?	?	?	6.99	did not advance			
16	4	Alfonso de Gortari	Mexico	?	?	?	6.97	did not advance			
17	1	Toon van Welsenes	Netherlands	?	?	?	6.96	did not advance			
18	4	Rudi Dobermann	Germany	?	?	?	6.91	did not advance			
18	2	Toimi Tulikoura	Finland	?	?	?	6.91	did not advance			
20	3	Gijs Lamoree	Netherlands	?	?	?	6.87	did not advance			
21	1	Paddy Anglim	Ireland	?	?	?	6.81	did not advance			
22	4	Adolf Meier	Switzerland	?	?	?	6.80	did not advance			
23	3	Lajos Balogh	Hungary	?	?	?	6.79	did not advance			
24	2	Imre Fekete	Hungary	?	?	?	6.77	did not advance			
25	2	Virgilio Tommasi	Italy	?	?	?	6.76	did not advance			
25	3	Enrico Torre	Italy	?	?	?	6.76	did not advance			
27	4	Charles Alzieu	France	?	?	?	6.70	did not advance			
28	1	Jacques Flouret	France	?	?	?	6.64	did not advance			
29	3	Konstantinos Petridis	Greece	?	?	?	6.63	did not advance			
30	4	Hermann Brügmann	Denmark	?	?	?	6.62	did not advance			
31	4	Arild Lenth	Norway	?	?	?	6.60	did not advance			
32	3	Reg Revans	Great Britain	?	?	?	6.58	did not advance			
33	2	Zdzisław Nowak	Poland	?	?	?	6.57	did not advance			
34	1	Óscar Alvarado	Chile	?	?	?	6.51	did not advance			
34	1	Gaston Médécin	Monaco	?	?	?	6.51	did not advance			
36	1	Tibor Püspöki	Hungary	?	?	?	6.45	did not advance			
37	2	Dalip Singh	India	?	?	?	6.45	did not advance			
38	3	Johannes Viljoen	South Africa	?	?	?	6.44	did not advance			
39	2	James Cohen	Great Britain	?	?	?	6.39	did not advance			
40	1	Alfred Sutter	Switzerland	?	?	?	6.23	did not advance			
41	4	Fernando Labourdette-Liaresq	Spain	?	?	?	6.16	did not advance			
—	—	Sid Atkinson	South Africa	DNS							
—	—	Stelios Benardis	Greece	DNS							
—	—	Pierre Dinard	France	DNS							
—	—	Walter Harrison	Australia	DNS							
—	—	Akilles Järvinen	Finland	DNS							
—	—	Kalle Järvinen	Finland	DNS							
—	—	Robert Loiseau	France	DNS							
—	—	Elemér Somfay	Hungary	DNS							
—	—	Nick Winter	Australia	DNS							
