= Toon van Welsenes =

Dutch athletics competitor

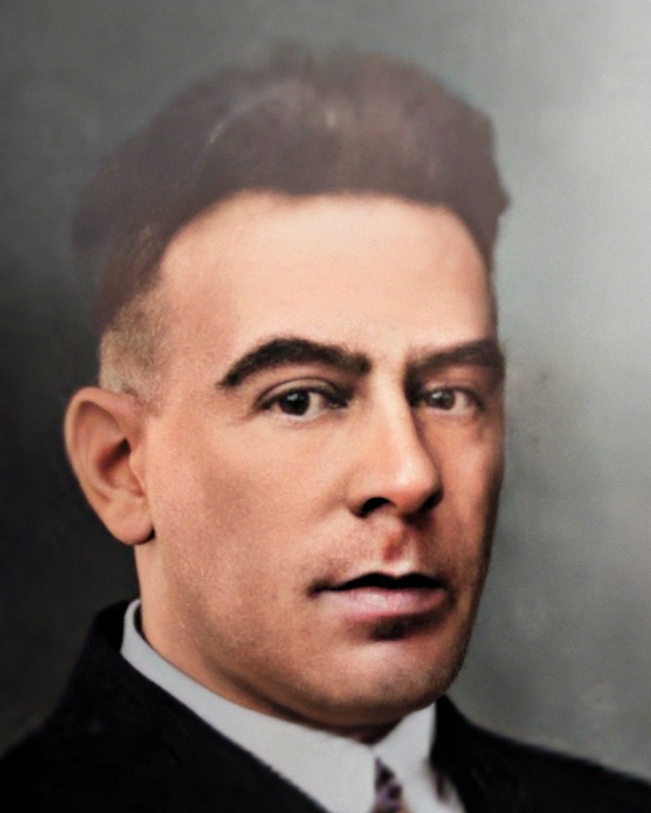

Personal information
- Nationality: Dutch
- Born: 7 October 1903 Haarlem, Noord-Holland, Netherlands
- Died: 2 July 1974 (aged 70) Haarlem, Noord-Holland, Netherlands

Sport
- Sport: Athletics
- Event: Long jump
- Club: AV Haarlem

Anton van Welsenes also known as Toon van Welsenes (7 October 1903 – 2 July 1974) was a Dutch athlete who competed at thee 1928 Summer Olympics.

== Biography ==
In 1928, van Welsenes competed in the men's long jump at his home Olympic Games in Amsterdam.

Van Welsenes finished second behind James Cohen in the long jump event at the 1929 AAA Championships and finished third behind fellow Dutchman Hannes de Boer in the long jump event at the 1931 AAA Championships.
