= Dick Barber =

American long jumper

Richard Alvah Barber (July 24, 1910 – May 22, 1983) was an American long jumper. Barber won the long jump at the 1932 United States Olympic Trials and qualified for the 1932 Summer Olympics, where he played fifth. He was IC4A long jump champion in 1931 and 1932.

== Career ==
Barber became a successful long jumper at Long Beach Polytechnic High School, winning the 1928 California state high school championship with a meeting record jump of 23 ft 5 1/4 in (7.14 m). After graduating from high school he entered the University of Southern California, where he was coached by Dean Cromwell. In 1929, his freshman year, he placed fourth at the national championships with a jump of 23 ft 5 1/2 in (7.15 m) and won the national junior title. (Note: "Junior" here doesn't refer to the current definition of athletes aged under 20; rather, the junior championships were open to athletes of any age, but the winners of major collegiate, national and international championship meets were ineligible.) He was one of the favorites at the 1930 IC4A championships, but failed to qualify for the final. At the other major collegiate meet of the year, the NCAA championships, Barber placed third behind Ed Gordon and Ed Hamm with a jump of 24 ft 2 1/4 in (7.37 m). USC Trojans were team champions in both meets.

Barber won the 1931 IC4A long jump title with a leap of 25 ft 3 1/2 in (7.71 m), which was a new meeting record; USC successfully defended its team title in a close battle against Stanford. At the NCAA meet Barber only jumped 24 ft 9 1/4 in (7.55 m) and placed third behind Gordon and Lamoine Boyle, but he was still named the top collegiate All-American. Barber injured his leg in a minor meet in March 1932 and missed the early part of the 1932 season, but returned in top form and jumped 25 ft 4 in (7.72 m) in Fresno on May 14. USC did not compete in the 1932 NCAA meet, but both the Trojans as a team and Barber individually successfully defended their IC4A titles.

At the 1932 Olympic Trials, Barber only placed seventh in the qualification, and normally only the top five qualified for the final. However, at the last moment the United States Olympic Committee decided to allow eight finalists instead of five; Barber thus qualified for the final, and jumped his personal best, 25 ft 4 3/8 in (7.73 m), to win the trials ahead of Gordon and Lambert Redd. Although the Trials doubled as the AAU (national) championships, Barber is not considered the 1932 AAU champion as the rule change only applied to the Trials and he would not have been a finalist under AAU rules; instead, Gordon became the national champion. As Trials champion, Barber was one of the favorites for the Olympics in Los Angeles, but in the Olympic final he only reached 24 ft 3 in (7.39 m) and placed fifth.

In addition to long jumping, Barber played for the Trojans football team starting in late 1931, and was a member of the 1931 and 1932 national championship teams.
