= Athletics at the 1932 Summer Olympics – Men's long jump =

Men's long jump at the Games of the X Olympiad
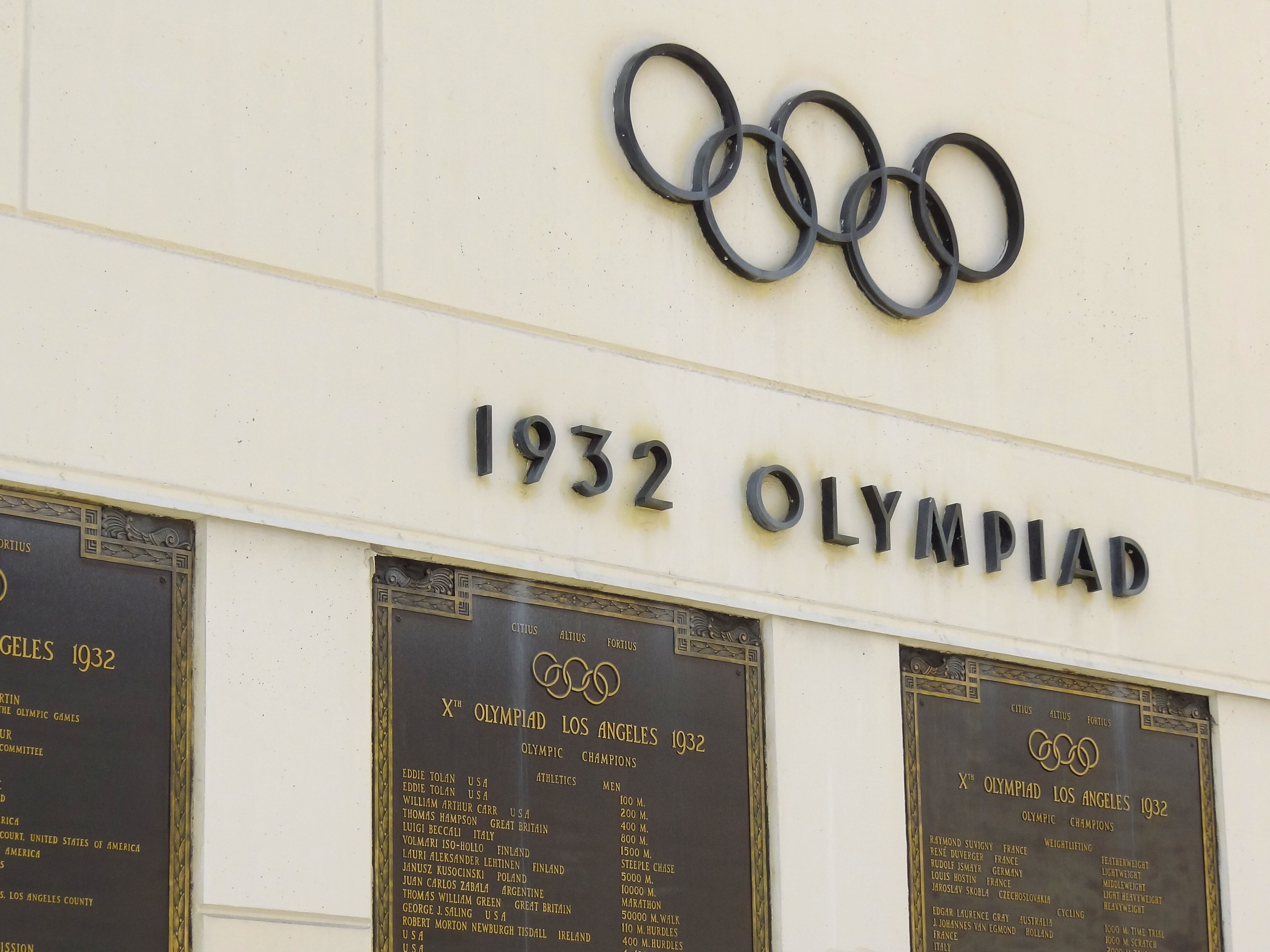
- Plaque commemorating the 1932 Olympics
- Venue: Los Angeles Memorial Coliseum
- Date: August 2, 1932
- Competitors: 12 from 9 nations
- Winning distance: 7.64

Medalists
1st place, gold medalist(s)		Ed Gordon; United States
2nd place, silver medalist(s)		Lambert Redd; United States
3rd place, bronze medalist(s)		Chuhei Nanbu; Japan

The men's long jump event at the 1932 Olympic Games took place August 2. Twelve athletes from 9 nations competed. The 1930 Olympic Congress in Berlin had reduced the limit from 4 athletes per NOC to 3 athletes. The event was won by Ed Gordon of the United States, the nation's third consecutive and eighth overall victory in the long jump.

== Background ==
This was the ninth appearance of the event, which is one of 12 athletics events to have been held at every Summer Olympics. The returning finalists from the 1928 Games were silver medalist Silvio Cator of Haiti and fifth-place finisher Erich Köchermann of Germany. Chūhei Nambu of Japan had broken the world record in 1931. Home nation favorites were Dick Barber (Olympic trials winner) and Ed Gordon (AAU champion).

Argentina and Brazil each made their first appearance in the event. The United States appeared for the ninth time, the only nation to have long jumpers at each of the Games thus far.

== Competition format ==
With a small field, the 1932 competition used a single round. All jumpers had six jumps.

== Records ==
These were the standing world and Olympic records (in metres) prior to the 1928 Summer Olympics.

World record	Chūhei Nambu (JPN)	7.98	Tokyo, Japan	27 October 1931
Olympic record	Robert LeGendre (USA)	7.765(*)	Paris, France	7 July 1924

(*) Robert LeGendre set the Olympic record in the 1924 pentathlon contest

== Schedule ==
Date	Time	Round
Tuesday, 2 August 1932	14:30	Final

== Results ==
Rank	Athlete	Nation	Final						
Rank	Athlete	Nation	1	2	3	4	5	6	Result
1st place, gold medalist(s)	Ed Gordon	United States	7.64	7.00	7.43	X	X	X	7.64
2nd place, silver medalist(s)	Lambert Redd	United States	X	7.60	X	7.39	X	7.49	7.60
3rd place, bronze medalist(s)	Chūhei Nambu	Japan	7.45	X	X	7.32	7.39	X	7.45
4	Erik Svensson	Sweden	7.27	7.24	7.41	7.06	—	—	7.41
5	Dick Barber	United States	Unknown						7.39
6	Naoto Tajima	Japan	Unknown						7.15
7	Héctor Berra	Argentina	Unknown						6.66
8	Clóvis Raposo	Brazil	Unknown						6.43
9	Silvio Cator	Haiti	Unknown						5.93
10	Esteban Crespo	Mexico	Unknown						5.83
11	Erich Köchermann	Germany	Unknown						5.75
12	Len Hutton	Canada	DNS						
—	João da Costa	Brazil	DNS						
—	Wolrad Eberle	Germany	DNS						
—	Kenkichi Oshima	Japan	DNS						
—	Nikolaos Papanikolaou	Greece	DNS						
—	Rafael Pérez	Cuba	DNS						
—	Onni Rajasaari	Finland	DNS						
—	Hermenegildo del Rosso	Argentina	DNS						
—	Hans-Heinrich Sievert	Germany	DNS						
—	József Szabó	Hungary	DNS						
—	Carlos Woebcken	Brazil	DNS						
