= Unia Tarnów =

Unia Tarnów can refer to:

- Unia Tarnów (basketball)
- Unia Tarnów (football)
- Unia Tarnów (handball)
- Unia Tarnów (motorcycle speedway)
- Unia Tarnów (sports club)
