= Athletics at the 1928 Summer Olympics – Men's triple jump =

Men's triple jump at the Games of the IX Olympiad
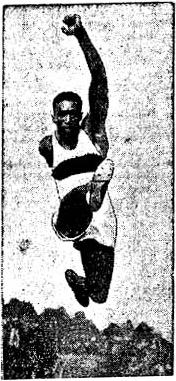
- Mikio Oda jumping
- Venue: Olympic Stadium
- Date: August 2, 1928
- Competitors: 24 from 13 nations
- Winning distance: 15.21

Medalists
1st place, gold medalist(s)		Mikio Oda	Japan
2nd place, silver medalist(s)		Levi Casey	United States
3rd place, bronze medalist(s)		Vilho Tuulos	Finland

Official Video

The men's triple jump event at the 1928 Olympic Games took place on August 2. Twenty-four athletes from 13 nations competed. The maximum number of athletes per nation was 4. The event was won by Mikio Oda of Japan, the nation's first medal in the men's triple jump. Levi Casey put the United States on the podium for the first time since 1924, with his silver. Vilho Tuulos of Finland took bronze, the first man to win a third medal in the event (gold in 1920, bronze in 1924).

== Background ==
This was the eighth appearance of the event, which is one of 12 athletics events to have been held at every Summer Olympics. Returning finalists from the 1924 Games were gold medalist Nick Winter of Australia, bronze medalist Vilho Tuulos and fourth-place finisher Väinö Rainio of Finland, and sixth-place finisher Mikio Oda of Japan. Oda was the favorite this time, winning the 1923, 1925 and 1927 Far East Championships; Tuulos was still a strong contender.

Denmark and New Zealand each made their first appearance in the event. The United States competed for the eighth time, having competed at each of the Games so far.

== Competition format ==
The competition was described as two rounds at the time, but was more similar to the modern divided final. All athletes received three jumps initially. The top six after that received an additional three jumps to improve their distance, but the initial jumps would still count if no improvement was made.

== Records ==
These were the standing world and Olympic records (in metres) prior to the 1928 Summer Olympics.

World record	Nick Winter (AUS)	15.525	Paris, France	12 July 1924
Olympic record	Nick Winter (AUS)	15.525	Paris, France	12 July 1924

No new world or Olympic records were set during the competition.

== Schedule ==
Date	Time	Round
Thursday, 2 August 1928		Qualifying; Final

== Results ==
The six best scores advanced to the final round. Three additional rounds were jumped in the final; the results of the qualifying rounds carried over.

Rank	Athlete	Nation	1	2	3	4	5	6	Distance
1st place, gold medalist(s)	Mikio Oda	Japan	15.02	15.13	15.21	X	14.30	X	15.21
2nd place, silver medalist(s)	Levi Casey	United States	14.13	14.53	14.93	X	X	15.17	15.17
3rd place, bronze medalist(s)	Vilho Tuulos	Finland	X	14.13	14.73	14.97	15.09	15.11	15.11
4	Chūhei Nambu	Japan	14.75	14.35	15.01	X	14.21	15.00	15.01
5	Toimi Tulikoura	Finland	14.37	14.53	14.70	14.34	X	14.62	14.70
6	Erkki Järvinen	Finland	14.63	14.65	14.23	14.06	X	X	14.65
7	Wim Peters	Netherlands	14.55			did not advance			14.55
8	Väinö Rainio	Finland	14.41			did not advance			14.41
9	Sidney Bowman	United States	14.35			did not advance			14.35
9	Jan Blankers	Netherlands	14.35			did not advance			14.35
11	Lloyd Bourgeois	United States	14.28			did not advance			14.28
12	Nick Winter	Australia	14.15			did not advance			14.15
13	Gijs Lamoree	Netherlands	14.08			did not advance			14.08
14	Imre Fekete	Hungary	14.07			did not advance			14.07
15	Steef van Musscher	Netherlands	13.93			did not advance			13.93
16	Alex Munroe	Canada	13.87			did not advance			13.87
17	Konstantinos Petridis	Greece	13.83			did not advance			13.83
18	Hermann Brügmann	Denmark	13.82			did not advance			13.82
19	Theo Phelan	Ireland	13.73			did not advance			13.73
20	Bob Kelley	United States	13.64			did not advance			13.64
21	Arild Lenth	Norway	13.39			did not advance			13.39
22	Ferenc Molnár	Hungary	13.36			did not advance			13.36
23	Wilfrid Kalaugher	New Zealand	12.94			did not advance			12.94
24	Johannes Viljoen	South Africa	12.49			did not advance			12.49
