= Anglim =

Anglim is a surname. Notable people with the surname include:

- Mário Roberto Emmett Anglim (1922–1973), American Roman Catholic bishop
- Paule Anglim (1923–2015), Canadian gallerist, art dealer and curator
- Philip Anglim (born 1953), American actor
- Paddy Anglim (1906–1954), Jumped the Long Jump for Ireland in the 1928 Olympics in Amsterdam

Anglim is also a modern Hebrew term for English-speaking primarily American Jews - either immigrants to Israel living in closed English-speaking communities, or as a temporary population of visitors to the country during Jewish festivals.
