= List of Moonlighting episodes =

The cover of the Moonlighting: The Complete Seasons One to Five Region 2 DVD box set (18 discs)

Moonlighting is an American comedy-drama television show created in 1985 by writer Glenn Gordon Caron. It centers on Maddie Hayes (Cybill Shepherd), a former model who loses most of her financial assets due to her accountant's embezzlement but unexpectedly finds that she owns a detective agency. She teams up with cocky, chauvinistic investigator David Addison (Bruce Willis) to run the agency and becomes embroiled in various unusual cases. The show's other regular characters are Agnes DiPesto (Allyce Beasley), the agency's receptionist, and Herbert Viola (Curtis Armstrong), one of the agency's investigators, who was introduced in the third season and became a featured character in the fourth season. The show mixes drama, comedy and romance, and often incorporates fantasy sequences or breaks the fourth wall.

The series premiered on ABC in the United States with a feature-length pilot episode on March 3, 1985. The series lasted 5 seasons, but only 66 episodes were produced, a low figure for American television, for which a full season normally includes at least 22 episodes. The show became notorious for failing to have a new episode ready to air each week, due to on-set problems including script issues and friction between actors and producers. Most episodes aired on Tuesday nights, although when the show returned in April 1989 after a two-month hiatus, the remaining episodes aired on Sunday nights.

During its early years, the series was popular with viewers and broke into the top ten of the Nielsen ratings in its third season. When Maddie and David ended more than two years of sexual tension by sleeping together in that season's highly publicized penultimate episode, "I Am Curious… Maddie", it drew an audience of 60 million viewers. The show was also a critical hit, receiving 16 Emmy Award nominations in 1986. Ratings declined, however, in the later seasons, and the show was canceled in 1989.

== Series overview ==
Season	Episodes	Originally released	
Season	Episodes	First released	Last released
1	7	March 3, 1985	April 2, 1985
2	18	September 24, 1985	May 13, 1986
3	15	September 23, 1986	May 5, 1987
4	14	September 29, 1987	March 22, 1988
5	13	December 6, 1988	May 14, 1989

== Episodes ==
=== Season 1 (1985) ===
No. overall	No. in season	Title	Directed by	Written by	Original release date	Viewers (millions)	Rating/share (households)
1	1	"Pilot"	Robert Butler	Glenn Gordon Caron	March 3, 1985	15.54	18.3/28
2	2	"Pilot"	Robert Butler	Glenn Gordon Caron	March 3, 1985	15.54	18.3/28
After being stripped of most of her financial assets by her embezzling accountant, former model Maddie Hayes discovers that she owns a number of money-losing businesses that were maintained as tax write-offs, including City of Angels detective agency. She decides to sell off the agency, to the dismay of David Addison, the wisecracking investigator who has been running it. David attempts to persuade her that the business has a future and should be kept open. Maddie accidentally comes into possession of a wristwatch that holds the clue to the location of a cache of smuggled Nazi diamonds. The pair retrieve the diamonds, but both the jewels and the criminal who was seeking them end up falling from the clock tower where the gems had been concealed. The pilot, originally presented on The ABC Sunday Night Movie, was split into two episodes for syndication.
3	3	"Gunfight at the So-So Corral"	Peter Werner	Michael Petryni	March 5, 1985	11.50	13.6/23
Maddie arrives for her first day of work at the renamed Blue Moon agency to find there are no cases on the books, so David poaches one from a rival agency. The detectives set out to find their client's missing son, but find out that he is a contract killer (Gary Graham). Unbeknownst to them, their client (Pat Corley) is also a hired killer and they are caught in the middle as the two men meet for a shoot-out. Tim Robbins also appears in this episode.
4	4	"Read the Mind… See the Movie"	Burt Brinckerhoff	Joe Gannon	March 12, 1985	9.08	10.7/19
Blue Moon is hired to provide security at a company run by one of Maddie's friends, which has been plagued by information leaks and sabotage. The company's main competitor claims that he is getting his inside information from a psychic. David and Maddie discover that the father of Maddie's friend also visits the psychic and conclude that he is selling company secrets, however the case turns out not to be that clear cut.
5	5	"The Next Murder You Hear"	Peter Werner	Peter Silverman	March 19, 1985	10.10	11.9/21
Maddie and David investigate the on-air shooting of a radio talk-show host. Although David thinks the case will be great publicity for the agency, Maddie is unsure whether to take it when she learns that the host was having an affair with a married woman. The host soon turns up alive, having faked his own death to keep the affair from his lover's husband who is also his ultimate boss. The husband / boss is then murdered. Both the host and his mistress hire Blue Moon to prove their innocence, whilst Maddie and David disagree over who they believe might actually have committed the murder.
6	6	"Next Stop Murder"	Kevin Connor	Ali Marie Matheson & Kerry Ehrin	March 26, 1985	11.72	13.9/24
The agency's ditzy receptionist, Agnes DiPesto, wins a place on a "murder mystery train" hosted by a famous writer of mystery stories. Maddie and David take her to the station and find themselves trapped on the train as well. While the train is in motion, the writer is murdered and the Blue Moon trio find that every one of the passengers had a motive. The episode concludes with a showdown atop the moving train.
7	7	"The Murder's in the Mail"	Peter Werner	Maryanne Kasica & Michael Scheff	April 2, 1985	13.58	16.0/27
David and Maddie do some moonlighting of their own for a debt collection agency when Blue Moon is short of money. They discover that one of the debtors has been killed, but when they return with the police, the body has disappeared and a completely different man is at the scene claiming to be the client. This leads the duo to become involved in an assassination plot and in order to save the suspected victim, whom they know is a Chinese man with a mole on his nose, they must get into a formal dinner event where their successful effort to prevent the murder culminates in a huge food fight amongst all the event's attendees.

=== Season 2 (1985–1986) ===
No. overall	No. in season	Title	Directed by	Written by	Original release date	Viewers (millions)	Rating/share (households)
8	1	"Brother, Can You Spare a Blonde?"	Peter Werner	Glenn Gordon Caron	September 24, 1985	15.12	17.6/27
David's brother Richie (Charles Rocket) arrives in town, spending money extravagantly and flirting with Maddie, which makes David jealous. Richie found $100,000 under the hood of his car, but refuses to go to the police as he is sure the money is "dirty". The money belongs to a drug dealer, who corners the Blue Moon team. However, the team scatters the money over a third floor mall balcony. This is the first episode of the series in which David and Maddie break the fourth wall, welcoming the audience back for the second season at the start of the episode.
9	2	"The Lady in the Iron Mask"	Christopher Leitch	Roger Director	October 1, 1985	14.86	17.3/26
David and Maddie are hired by a woman in a veil to track down an ex-boyfriend who threw acid on her face in a fit of anger. She claims she wants to give him another chance, but shortly after they find him, he is killed. The investigators discover that the person who actually hired them was an impostor and must find the real killer, leading to a chaotic chase scene in which everyone is wearing the same dress and veil.
10	3	"Money Talks, Maddie Walks"	Christian I. Nyby II	Kerry Ehrin & Ali Marie Matheson	October 8, 1985	16.06	18.7/27
Maddie learns that her ex-accountant has bought a new life in Argentina with the money he stole from her. She is determined to travel there and confront him, against David's advice. When she travels there, David follows her. The finale involves a poker game in which Maddie stakes everything she owns against the accountant's money. David convinces her to fold but then realises she had a winning hand.
11	4	"The Dream Sequence Always Rings Twice"	Peter Werner	Debra Frank & Carl Sautter	October 15, 1985	16.66	19.4/28
This episode is a tribute to 1940s film noir, shot mostly in black and white on location at the Aquarius Theater, called "Flamingo Cove" in the show. Maddie and David learn of a murder committed at a 1940s night club. Each dreams the role of the convicted murderer and the circumstances leading to the crime, but each dream sequence is coloured by the bias of the dreamer. Cybill Shepherd performs the big band songs "Blue Moon" and "I Told Ya I Love Ya, Now Get Out". Orson Welles introduces the episode, his last performance before his death; the episode aired six days after his death. In 1997, TV Guide ranked this episode No. 34 on its list of the 100 Greatest Episodes.
12	5	"My Fair David"	Will Mackenzie	Bruce Franklin Singer	October 29, 1985	16.49	19.2/29
After walking in on an office limbo party, Maddie bets David that he will not be able to act like a mature adult for one week. If he loses, he must fire two employees, whereas if she loses she must limbo in front of all the staff. David loses the bet, but Maddie lets him off the hook. The duo are also involved in a case surrounding the kidnapping of a concert pianist. Moonlighting was preempted by the third game of the 1985 World Series on October 22, 1985.
13	6	"Knowing Her"	Peter Werner	Jeff Reno & Ron Osborn	November 12, 1985	15.20	17.7/26
Maddie takes a wealthy female client (Dana Delany) who wants to retrieve a stolen locket. David, who used to date the client, begins to suspect that her estranged husband is threatening her when she has a series of apparent accidents. The client shoots her husband during a confrontation and it looks like self-defense, but Maddie is not convinced.
14	7	"Somewhere Under the Rainbow"	Peter Crane	S : Frank Dandridge; S/T : Debra Frank & Carl Sautter	November 19, 1985	14.95	17.4/25
A woman is being chased by several men, and hires the agency to protect her. She claims to be a leprechaun and that the men are after her pot of gold. Maddie does not want to take the case, as she believes the woman needs psychiatric help, but David gets her involved anyway. The "pot of gold" turns out to be loot stolen from a bank in Ireland by the woman's father many years earlier.
15	8	"Portrait of Maddie"	Peter Werner	Kerry Ehrin & Ali Marie Matheson	November 26, 1985	15.03	17.5/25
An artist paints a portrait of Maddie, whom he has never met, and then commits suicide. Maddie buys the painting and presents it to the artist's brother, only for him to also die, leading the police to suspect her of foul play. It transpires that the artist and his brother were part of a gang who stole a valuable painting, and their surviving accomplice is convinced that the portrait of Maddie holds a clue to where it is hidden.
16	9	"Atlas Belched"	Christian I. Nyby II	Roger Director	December 10, 1985	16.41	19.1/28
David takes a case from a young executive (Mark Linn-Baker), who has lost his boss's prized Rolodex containing the contact details of a number of celebrities. When the detectives assist him in tracking it down, he attempts to hold it hostage. Meanwhile, Maddie sells the agency to a wealthier rival firm, which upsets David, who announces his intention to start up his own agency. Maddie realizes she has made a mistake and convinces her rival to give the agency back to her.
17	10	"Twas the Episode Before Christmas"	Peter Werner	Glenn Gordon Caron	December 17, 1985	16.84	19.6/30
A man named Joseph is murdered by criminals he testified against and his wife, Mary, leaves her baby in Agnes' apartment. She enlists Maddie and David to help find the baby, and encounters "the three kings" (three FBI agents all called King). The baby's mother eventually turns up at Blue Moon, but Agnes and the baby are gone, and are eventually found at Maddie's house being held at gunpoint. The episode ends with the cast, crew, and their families singing a Christmas carol to the viewers.
18	11	"The Bride of Tupperman"	Will MacKenzie & Christian I. Nyby II	Jeff Reno & Ron Osborn	January 14, 1986	15.63	18.2/26
A wealthy but lonely man hires the detectives to find him a suitable wife. Although Maddie initially does not want to take the case as Blue Moon is not a dating agency, they eventually decide to go their separate ways, each finding a candidate based on their own ideals. The client seems to choose the woman selected by David, but then it transpires that not only did he choose both women, but that he was already married. When they attempt to confront him, they find the woman chosen by David dead and the client in the hospital, which leads them to discover his true scheme.
19	12	"North by North DiPesto"	Christopher Hibler	Debra Frank & Carl Sautter	January 21, 1986	18.55	21.6/31
Agnes is looking for some excitement in her life, so Maddie and David give her their tickets to a top industry banquet. This leads to her involvement in an espionage operation which sees her kidnapped and interrogated. She manages to escape to a laundry, and discovers that it is being used by spies to hide stolen plans. Her adventures lead her to conclude that she is happy with her life after all.
20	13	"In God We Strongly Suspect"	Will Mackenzie	Scott Spencer Gordon	February 11, 1986	16.92	19.7/29
David and Maddie are hired to watch over the body of an escape artist. He threatened that he would come back from the dead and kill his widow. The detectives spend the night in the morgue, but in the morning the corpse has disappeared, and soon afterwards the widow is found dead. Maddie and David discover that the escape artist is in fact still alive and involved in a diamond heist, during which he seemingly dies again.
21	14	"Every Daughter's Father is a Virgin"	Christopher Hibler	Bruce Franklin Singer	February 18, 1986	16.24	18.9/28
Maddie's parents, Alex and Virginia (Robert Webber and Eva Marie Saint), pay her a visit, and Virginia confides that she thinks her husband is having an affair. Maddie asks David to follow her father, hoping that he will discover that this is untrue, but David discovers that Alex is indeed seeing another woman. Maddie cannot bring herself to tell her mother but instead launches a furious attack on her father, who later tells her that he has ended the affair and it will never happen again.
22	15	"Witness for the Execution"	Paul Krasny	Jeff Reno & Ron Osborn	March 11, 1986	17.61	20.5/31
An elderly and very sick man tells Maddie and David that he wishes to die, but that if he kills himself his life insurance policy will not pay out. He has therefore hired someone to murder him and wants the sleuths to witness the act. Maddie refuses to handle the case, but David gets involved anyway and ends up being framed for the man's murder. He resolves to escape the law by going on the run, but ultimately returns home, unaware that Maddie has solved the case and cleared his name. This episode contains the first non-imaginary kiss between the two leads.
23	16	"Sleep Talkin' Guy"	Christopher Hibler	Debra Frank & Carl Sautter	April 1, 1986	18.12	21.1/32
David becomes famous when he solves several big cases in quick succession. Maddie is impressed, unaware that he is using information passed to him by a prostitute with a mobster client who talks in his sleep about people who are due to be killed. Everything is going well for David until he is told that he is the next person to be killed. He ends up in a fistfight with the mobster and gets punched by Maddie when she learns the truth about his source.
24	17	"Funeral for a Door Nail"	Allan Arkush	S : Jonathan Lemkin; T : Jeff Reno & Ron Osborn and Charles H. Eglee	April 29, 1986	16.41	19.1/30
Depressed after the apparent death of his wife but unable to bring himself to commit suicide, a man decides to hire a hitman to kill him. After realizing she is in fact still alive, he hires Blue Moon to find her and stop the hitman but, unexpectedly, the client dies anyway, leading to an investigation into his shady lawyer. Maddie also invites David to attend a wedding with her. He says he would be delighted, which makes her uncomfortable, and he is disappointed when they have to cancel due to the case.
25	18	"Camille"	Peter Werner	Roger Director	May 13, 1986	16.58	19.3/30
Conwoman Camille Brand (Whoopi Goldberg) becomes a national hero after accidentally preventing the assassination of a politician. David and Maddie decide to cash in on the publicity by giving her a job. A crooked policeman (Judd Nelson) spends much of the episode pursuing and attempting to arrest Camille. The episode ends with an extended sequence in which the characters wander right off the show's set into other parts of the studio, and several members of the show's production crew appear on camera as part of the plot resolution.

=== Season 3 (1986–1987) ===
No. overall	No. in season	Title	Directed by	Written by	Original release date	Viewers (millions)	Rating/share (households)
26	1	"The Son Also Rises"	Allan Arkush	Jeff Reno & Ron Osborn	September 23, 1986	21.76	24.9/38
David's father (Paul Sorvino) visits the agency and tells his son that he is getting married and wants him to be best man. David is shocked to find that the bride-to-be is a woman with whom he once spent an "unforgettable" night of passion, which makes him very uncomfortable and causes friction between father and son. After a heart-to-heart talk at the wedding, David is surprised to learn that she does not remember him at all.
27	2	"The Man Who Cried Wife"	Christian Nyby	Kerry Ehrin	September 30, 1986	22.20	25.4/38
A man hires Blue Moon to find his wife. He is certain that he killed her during an argument, but the day after he buried her in the woods, she started harassing him with threatening phone calls. After an argument about whether or not to deal with a man who would strike his wife, Maddie and David trace the woman, but during a car chase she seemingly drives over a cliff and dies again. This episode introduces the character MacGillicuddy.
28	3	"Symphony in Knocked Flat"	Paul Lynch	Dale Gelineau & Pauline Miller	October 21, 1986	18.09	20.7/30
Following an argument about their respective expectations from a date, David challenges Maddie to provide a "fun" evening out, while he provides her with a "fine" one. He promises to take her to the theater but is only able to obtain tickets from a scalper, which gets the duo involved in an assassination plot. The episode culminates with David being forced to take the place of one of the participants in a boxing match promoted by Don King, who makes a guest appearance. The Temptations also make a short appearance at the beginning of the episode.
29	4	"Yours, Very Deadly"	Christian Nyby	Roger Director	October 28, 1986	20.89	23.9/37
A married woman who has been writing to an unknown admirer hires Maddie and David to find him and tell him that she cannot continue the correspondence. Both the woman and the anonymous letter writer are killed in an apparent murder/suicide, but the Blue Moon team unmasks the real killer. This episode introduces new character Herbert Viola, a temp clerk on whom Agnes has a ferocious crush, and who would become part of the featured cast in the fourth season.
30	5	"All Creatures Great and… Not So Great"	Christian Nyby	S : Eric Blakeney, Gene Miller; S/T : Charles H. Eglee	November 11, 1986	22.55	25.9/38
A Catholic priest hires Blue Moon to find a woman he has fallen in love with during confession, even though he does not know her name, or what she looks like. The detectives trace the woman and are surprised to find her apparently happily married, contradicting what the priest said. When she seemingly commits suicide, Maddie and David are convinced that she has actually been murdered.
31	6	"Big Man on Mulberry Street"	Christian Nyby	Karen Hall	November 18, 1986	21.50	24.6/37
The episode commences with Maddie and David having a huge fight when David shows up late and disheveled for a morning meeting with a client. Then, Maddie is shocked to discover that David was once married when he tells her that his former brother-in-law has died and that he must go to New York for the funeral. The episode includes a lengthy dance number set to Billy Joel's song "Big Man on Mulberry Street", in which Maddie dreams of the relationship between David and his ex-wife. She follows him to New York and discovers that, although he had told her the truth when he said he caught his wife in bed with someone else, he had neglected to mention that it was another woman.
32	7	"Atomic Shakespeare"	Will Mackenzie	Ron Osborn & Jeff Reno	November 25, 1986	16.43	18.8/29
A teenage Moonlighting fan is forced by his mother to do his homework rather than watch the show. He imagines the regular characters enacting a version of William Shakespeare's play The Taming of the Shrew in period costume and setting but in the style of an episode of the show. Bruce Willis performs the song "Good Lovin'", originally recorded by The Young Rascals. In 2009, TV Guide ranked this episode No. 48 on its list of the 100 Greatest Episodes.
33	8	"It's a Wonderful Job"	Ed Sherin	Debra Frank & Carl Sautter	December 16, 1986	22.81	26.1/39
This episode is a homage to the classic movie It's a Wonderful Life. Maddie is forcing the Blue Moon employees to work over Christmas because a client's court case has been moved up to December 28th; after getting flack from David and all the employees she wishes she had never kept the agency open. Her guardian angel obliges and shows her how things would have turned out if she had closed it down. Everyone else has become wealthy and successful thanks to not being tied to the agency, but Maddie has had "a very bad year" and commits suicide. Ultimately Maddie decides that she is glad she kept the agency open. The episode ends with Maddie and David sharing a passionate kiss and wishing "to all a good night".
34	9	"The Straight Poop"	Jay Daniel	Glenn Gordon Caron	January 6, 1987	18.70	21.4/31
Gossip columnist Rona Barrett arrives at Blue Moon to investigate why there is no new episode, and why David and Maddie are unable to get along with each other. This acts as a framework for a clip show. The episode ends with Maddie and David promising that there will be a new episode next week.
35	10	"Poltergeist III – Dipesto Nothing"	Christopher Hibler	Karen Hall & Charles Eglee	January 13, 1987	19.23	22.1/32
Herbert is hired full-time and put to work on cases. Agnes is jealous of his increasing status at Blue Moon, and, when Maddie and David decline to take on the case of a woman who wants proof that her house is haunted, she takes it on herself. The haunting turns out to have been engineered by the family doctor, looking to profit from oil found on the site of the house.
36	11	"Blonde on Blonde"	Jay Daniel	Kerry Ehrin	February 3, 1987	20.71	23.7/35
Maddie reveals to David that she feels frustrated and would consider having a one-night stand with any man she meets, which upsets David. He follows her to a club, but mistakenly ends up tailing a different girl and becomes implicated in a murder. After a night in police custody he resolves to tell Maddie that he loves her, but when he arrives at her house in the early hours of the morning, another man (Mark Harmon) answers the door and states that Maddie is asleep.
37	12	"Sam & Dave"	Sam Weisman	S : Karen Hall, Ron Osborn and Jeff Reno; T : Charles Eglee & Roger Director	February 10, 1987	22.64	25.9/38
Starts with a cameo by Jeff Jarvis. The detectives are hired by a woman who wants to know if her lover is "falling back in love" with his wife. David learns that the man he met at Maddie's house is her former boyfriend, a well-educated and highly erudite astronaut called Sam Crawford. When Maddie refuses to break a date with Sam in order to take part in a stakeout, David interrupts their dinner saying he needs to talk to Maddie about an emergency but he is not able to say what he plans before Sam returns to the table. David gets drunk, and makes a fool of himself after which Sam takes him home and then sleeps with Maddie.
38	13	"Maddie's Turn to Cry"	Allan Arkush	S : Charles H. Eglee and Karen Hall; T : Roger Director, Jeff Reno & Ron Osborn	March 3, 1987	18.62	21.3/31
Maddie is torn between her feelings for Sam and David, whom she accuses of being jealous. Sam asks Maddie to marry him. In the middle of the night, Maddie leaves her house to visit David asking what he had wanted to tell her so urgently the other night. In a continuation of the case from the previous episode, the detectives investigate an apparent suicide which turns out to be a murder, leading to a chase in a bowling alley to catch the villains after which both David and Maddie say they had a great time catching the criminals.
39	14	"I Am Curious… Maddie"	Allan Arkush	S : Ron Osborn, Karen Hall, Roger Director and Charles H. Eglee; T : Glenn Gordon Caron & Jeff Reno	March 31, 1987	25.78	29.5/44
Sam is upset that Maddie has not given an answer to his proposal. She and David row about her relationships with the two men, and Sam and David brawl in a parking garage. Maddie ultimately decides that she is not ready for marriage, and returns home to tell Sam, and thinking the man lying in her bed with his head turned down is Sam, gives a statement about why she cannot marry him including stating she loves both him and David. After the statement, the man turns over and it turns out to be David who tells Maddie that Sam has left for good. After an argument, they end up making love. In 1996, TV Guide included this episode as part of its 100 Most Memorable moments in TV History, ranking it number 77.
40	15	"To Heiress Human"	Sam Weisman	Kerry Ehrin	May 5, 1987	18.35	21.0/33
Maddie and David both feel awkward after finally spending a night together. She wants them to make a pact that "last night never happened", but he refuses and ultimately they end up sleeping together again. They are also involved in the case of an heiress whose father disapproves of her boyfriend. When the father is apparently killed, both his daughter and her boyfriend claim to have committed the crime in an attempt to save the other.

=== Season 4 (1987–1988) ===
No. overall	No. in season	Title	Directed by	Written by	Original release date	Rating/share (households)
41	1	"A Trip to the Moon"	Allan Arkush	Glenn Gordon Caron	September 29, 1987	25.9/40
After a month of sleeping with David, Maddie wonders where the relationship is heading. She fears that they do not actually have a relationship as all they do is sleep together. David attempts to woo her with a proper date but they end up arguing. She says they need to get out of each other's lives, and the episode ends with her catching an airplane. This episode features three fantasy sequences, one in which Maddie receives relationship advice from Dr. Joyce Brothers, one in which David receives similar counselling from Ray Charles, and one in which the regulars take the roles of the leads in The Honeymooners.
42	2	"Come Back Little Shiksa"	Allan Arkush	Jeff Reno & Ron Osborn	October 6, 1987	21.8/34
Maddie arrives at her parents' house in Chicago, and they are immediately suspicious that she has turned up unannounced and cannot tell them how long she plans to stay. David is hired by a man (John Goodman) who wishes to locate a former one-night stand. When he tracks her down she tells him she is on the run from her husband, a hitman. This episode features a fantasy sequence in which Maddie and David are depicted in claymation.
43	3	"Take a Left at the Altar"	Sam Weisman	Karen Hall	October 13, 1987	21.0/32
Maddie has been gone for two weeks and David is waiting endlessly for a phone call from her. In her absence, he teams up with Herbert try to find a man who failed to show up for his wedding. His jilted bride's brother wants to pay him to go through with the wedding, but it transpires he was already married. The following day, the runaway groom is found dead, and Blue Moon's client is the chief suspect. David writes Maddie a letter which ends "this is all crap, I'm miserable and want you to come home."
44	4	"Tale in Two Cities"	Allan Arkush	Charles Eglee & Roger Director	November 3, 1987	19.9/31
Maddie's parents throw a party in an attempt to cheer her up, but this just makes her angry. David continues to brood in Los Angeles. He and Herbert, who thinks he has lost Agnes to another man, go out on the town and take two women home. Herbert decides that he cannot go through with it because of his love for Agnes, but David spends the night with his date, which only makes him more depressed. Maddie discovers she is pregnant, but when she calls David to tell him, he is out. She tells Agnes, but instructs her not to tell David. Moonlighting was preempted by the third game of the 1987 World Series on October 20, 1987.
45	5	"Cool Hand Dave (Part 1)"	Allan Arkush	Charles Eglee & Roger Director	November 17, 1987	19.2/30
Agnes lets slip to Herbert that Maddie is pregnant. Despite promising not to let David know, Herbert tells him anyway. David races to the airport intent on booking a flight to Chicago, but finds himself tricked into swapping places with a convict on his way to prison. The guards refuse to believe that he is not the prisoner, and he ends up in solitary confinement. To be continued…
46	6	"Cool Hand Dave (Part 2)"	Allan Arkush	Charles Eglee & Roger Director	December 1, 1987	20.7/32
David is still in prison and nobody knows where he is, including network executives, who begin auditioning a replacement. He uses a secret tunnel to reach a telephone and call Chicago, but only speaks to Maddie's mother. He discovers the illegal activities of a prison warder, who is about to kill him when a riot starts, allowing David to escape. The episode features a lengthy musical number performed by the prisoners in the style of "When I Was a Lad" from Gilbert and Sullivan's H.M.S. Pinafore.
47	7	"Father Knows Last"	Allan Arkush	Kerry Ehrin	December 15, 1987	18.8/28
David returns to Blue Moon to find repossession agents clearing out the furniture, and the staff about to walk out having not been paid. Maddie's father finds out about her pregnancy and goes to see David in Los Angeles to persuade him to "do the right thing". David points out that the baby might not be his, and they row about his apparent lack of responsibility. He catches up with Mr Hayes at the airport and gives an impassioned speech about how much he loves Maddie. Mr Hayes apologizes and loans him the money to buy new furniture. David returns to the office with the furniture and a book on preparing for fatherhood.
48	8	"Los Dos DiPestos"	Gerald Perry Finnerman	Doug Steinberg	January 5, 1988	19.1/29
Agnes's mother (Imogene Coca) arrives in Los Angeles for a visit, fresh from a holiday in Mexico. She has brought back an apparently worthless souvenir but is being pursued by various unsavoury characters who are prepared to kill to get their hands on it. Agnes and Herbert investigate the case. Cybill Shepherd does not appear in this episode.
49	9	"Fetal Attraction"	Allan Arkush	S : Ron Osborn, Jeff Reno & Kerry Ehrin; T : Charles H. Eglee and Roger Director	January 19, 1988	18.8/28
David is preparing for fatherhood and finds a partner (Brooke Adams) to attend Lamaze classes with him. She begins to develop feelings for him, which he seems to reciprocate. Maddie finds out about David's dedication to fatherhood and makes preparations to return to Los Angeles to attempt to work things out.
50	10	"Tracks of My Tears"	Paul Krasny	S : Debra Frank and Kerry Ehrin; T : Judith Kahan	February 2, 1988	21.4/32
Maddie travels back to Los Angeles by train, still unsure whether or not she and David should resume their relationship. She meets Walter Bishop (Dennis Dugan) on the way and tells him all about her troubles. When she returns to the office, David is angry at first but later tells her that he missed her and that he wants to start over. She tells him that when the train stopped in Las Vegas, she and Walter got married on the spur of the moment. She also tells him that the baby is not his. Pat Boone appears as a future version of David in a dream sequence.
51	11	"Eek! A Spouse!"	Artie Mandelberg	S : Roger Director, Kerry Ehrin & Jeff Reno; T : Ron Osborn and Charles H. Eglee	February 9, 1988	19.5/28
Maddie is surprised and angry to find that David is not upset about her marriage, and he eventually reveals that it is because he does not believe she really is married. When he becomes convinced that she is, he attempts to test her to prove her love for Walter. Although he is unconvinced, he makes her put her wedding ring on, to prove things are not "just like old times" any more. Meanwhile, the detectives are hired by a woman to pay her husband's mistress to leave town. The husband confronts his wife and is shot dead, seemingly in self-defence. Herbert unravels the true complexity of the case, while Maddie and David are busy arguing.
52	12	"Maddie Hayes Got Married"	Paul Krasny	Charles Eglee & Roger Director	March 1, 1988	17.4/26
David finally meets Walter, and accuses Maddie of being ashamed of him. Maddie denies this and says she wishes she'd had a lavish church wedding to prove her commitment to everyone. David organises such a wedding, inviting the whole office. He takes Terri, his former Lamaze partner, to the wedding, during which she goes into labor. During a chaotic hospital scene, Terri and Walter accuse Maddie and David of being madly in love with each other. They deny it and fight, yelling that they hate each other, but ultimately end up in a passionate kiss.
53	13	"Here's Living With You, Kid"	Artie Mandelberg	S : Roger Director, Charles H. Eglee & Kerry Ehrin; T : Jeff Reno and Ron Osborn	March 15, 1988	14.7/23
This is the only episode in which neither Bruce Willis nor Cybill Shepherd appear. The focus is instead on Herbert, who has been charged with guarding a new experimental species of grapefruit from corporate espionage. He asks Agnes to move in with him, but she insists she is not ready. His disappointment leads to two dream sequences, parodies of Casablanca and the movies of Rudolph Valentino, in both of which she rejects him totally. At the end of the episode, however, she admits her love for him and agrees to move in.
54	14	"And the Flesh Was Made Word"	Paul Krasny	Kerry Ehrin	March 22, 1988	18.4/29
Blue Moon is hired by a businessman to find the woman that his partner is infatuated with, which turns out to be his wife. Maddie and Walter have their marriage annulled, leading to celebration in the office, but David is initially unsure how he feels about it. Ultimately he decides to try to start over with Maddie, and they schedule dinner, Lamaze class, and a "talk" every Tuesday at 9pm (the timeslot in which the programme aired). The script for this episode came up short due to a writers' strike, so the remaining time is padded out with an ad-libbed musical number.

=== Season 5 (1988–1989) ===
No. overall	No. in season	Title	Directed by	Written by	Original release date	U.S. viewers (millions)	Rating/share (households)
55	1	"A Womb With a View"	Jay Daniel	Glenn Gordon Caron & Charles Eglee	December 6, 1988	26.8	17.9/27
Maddie's unborn baby (Bruce Willis) receives a visit from an angel who has arrived to prepare him for his birth by showing him his parents and the world. The baby is upset by his parents' fighting, but the angel assures him that they care about each other. When he is shown the evil in the world, the baby says he does not want to be born, but the angel explains the purpose of life to him. Maddie begins to miscarry, and the angel tells the unborn baby that he is not now destined to be born to these parents, but that he'll be born into another family, possibly on Growing Pains or The Cosby Show.
56	2	"Between a Yuk and a Hard Place"	Dennis Dugan	Kerry Ehrin	December 13, 1988	26.2	17.5/27
In the wake of her miscarriage, Maddie throws herself into her work, while David plans a lengthy trip out of town. The detectives are hired by a woman who thinks her husband may be concealing the fact that he has been married before. It transpires that his previous wife died and he was tried for her murder. He was acquitted, but later confessed that he had in fact done it. Then his current wife is killed and he confesses to the murder, but Maddie proves his innocence. Maddie and David finally confront their feelings over the miscarriage after being stuck overnight in an elevator.
57	3	"The Color of Maddie"	Artie Mandelberg	Barbara Hall	December 20, 1988	23.7	16.0/25
A woman comes to Blue Moon wondering if the man with whom she is living is really her husband. He went missing ten years ago, but has now returned, yet she is not sure it is the same man. He seemingly dies in an explosion, and David finds out that he was an escaped prisoner who was wanted in five states. The detectives received a reward check for the information on him and plan to give it to his wife, but then she is killed and her husband turns out not to be dead after all. David is annoyed when Maddie insists that they are "pals" and says he knows her better than she will admit.
58	4	"Plastic Fantastic Lovers"	Allan Arkush	Jerry Stahl	January 10, 1989	23.4	16.5/25
Blue Moon is hired by a victim of botched plastic surgery, who wants the detectives to find some "dirt" on the surgeon so that he can ruin him. David and Maddie find that the surgeon usually treats women, making them "perfect" and then having affairs with them. They debate whether their own relationship was ever more than superficial. At the end of the episode they nearly kiss once again but stop short.
59	5	"Shirts and Skins"	Artie Mandelberg	Roger Director	January 17, 1989	22.2	15.4/24
Maddie agrees to take on the case of a female worker who shot her boss after she was fired for refusing to sleep with him. At the same time, David takes on the case of the boss. This leads to the office dividing along gender lines, with the men pursuing one side of the case and the women the other. The end credits are accompanied by bloopers from previous episodes.
60	6	"Take My Wife, For Example"	Dennis Dugan	James Kramer	February 7, 1989	19.1	13.5/19
A famously fierce divorce lawyer known as "The Barracuda" has a crisis of conscience and hires Blue Moon to help save a marriage. It transpires that the wife is in fact sleeping with the husband's business partner, who is then killed and the husband accused of his murder. Maddie buys David a car, which he hates, but it is totaled during a chase scene. He uses the insurance money to buy her a necklace and she responds with a passionate kiss.
61	7	"I See England, I See France, I See Maddie's Netherworld"	Paul Krasny	Chris Ruppenthal	February 14, 1989	17.5	12.4/19
A man comes to the agency in an attempt to hire a bodyguard, but abruptly dies in Maddie's office. His friend arrives looking for him and reveals that they have won the lottery, and he has only half the winning ticket. This turns out to be a red herring, as various parties are actually after secret naval plans encoded in a tattoo on the dead man's body. In a surreal dream sequence, Maddie finds herself in the afterlife, with David as the Grim Reaper. The Kipper Kids appeared in this scene as a pair of gravediggers. After this episode, the show went on hiatus for two months.
62	8	"Those Lips, Those Lies"	Dennis Dugan	James Kramer & Chris Ruppenthal	April 2, 1989	10.6	6.9/11
David's brother, Richie, arrives with his new girlfriend (Rita Wilson) and asks a favor from David and Maddie. His girlfriend's business partner embezzled all her money and he wants them to get it back, but David is reluctant to work for free. It transpires that Richie's girlfriend ran a prostitution ring, and is only using him to gain revenge on her former partner for taking all her girls and clients. The cast perform the opening title song, as Al Jarreau, who sang the actual theme song, was allegedly unaware that the series had moved timeslot.
63	9	"Perfetc"	Gerald Perry Finnerman	S : Jeff Reno & Ron Osborn; T : James Kramer, Chris Ruppenthal & Jerry Stahl	April 9, 1989	9.5	6.2/10
A dying man hires Blue Moon to help prove that he committed the "perfect crime." David is intrigued and thinks it will be good publicity, but Maddie does not want to get involved. It transpires that not only is the client not dying, but that he did not actually commit the crime he claims credit for.
64	10	"When Girls Collide"	Dennis Dugan	S : Charles Eglee; T : Merrill Markoe; S/T : Leo Tecate	April 16, 1989	8.8	6.0/10
Maddie's cousin Annie (Virginia Madsen) arrives in Los Angeles. David takes the two women out dancing and ends up sleeping with Annie. This leads to an argument with Maddie, who informs David that Annie is married and says he only got involved with Annie to make her jealous. The storyline continues in the episode "Eine Kleine Nacht Murder", but the episodes were broadcast out of sequence. This episode features a cameo appearance by Bruce Willis's then-wife Demi Moore.
65	11	"In 'n Outlaws"	Christopher Welch	Marc Abraham	April 23, 1989	8.8	5.9/10
Agnes misses Herbert's family reunion when she is called for jury duty. She is the only juror convinced of the defendant's innocence, and the jury is now sequestered until a verdict can be agreed. Herbert is desperate to ensure that Agnes makes it to the reunion so sets out to solve the case himself.
66	12	"Eine Kleine Nacht Murder"	Jay Daniel	Barbara Hall	April 30, 1989	8.6	6.4/11
Maddie witnesses a murder and is placed under police protection, but David thinks her bodyguard is crooked and is planning to kill her himself. Annie moves in with David, largely because of the discomfort their relationship is causing Maddie. David goes to Maddie's house to convince her to try to flee from the bad guys, only for a SWAT team to show up and severely damage the house.
67	13	"Lunar Eclipse"	Dennis Dugan	Ron Clark	May 14, 1989	8.6	5.7/10
Annie's husband Mark arrives in town and she wants to tell him about her and David, but David is unsure. Mark comes to believe that she is having an affair with Herbert. David engineers a scenario in which Annie catches him with another woman, prompting her to leave town with her husband. Herbert and Agnes get married, but the wedding ends in a brawl and everyone spends the night in jail. Maddie and David learn that Moonlighting has been cancelled when they return to the office and it is in the process of being dismantled by studio staff. They confront a producer, who tells them that "romance is a fragile thing" and that theirs is over. They rush to a church in an attempt to get married, but the priest refuses to marry them and they are left alone to reminisce. The series ends with a montage of flashbacks.
