= Clóvis Raposo =

Brazilian long jumper

Personal information
- Nationality: Brazilian
- Born: 30 May 1909
- Died: 3 May 1963 (aged 53)

Sport
- Sport: Athletics
- Event: Long jump

Clóvis Raposo (30 May 1909 – 3 May 1963) was a Brazilian athlete. He competed in the men's long jump at the 1932 Summer Olympics in Los Angeles, finishing in eighth place.
