= Zdzisław Nowak =

Polish athletics competitor

Personal information
- Nationality: Polish
- Born: 10 January 1906 Tarnów, Austria-Hungary
- Died: 26 June 1996 (aged 90) Tarnów, Poland

Sport
- Sport: Athletics
- Event: Long jump
- Club: Unia Tarnów

Zdzisław Antoni Nowak (10 January 1906 – 26 June 1996) was a Polish athlete (high jumper and long jumper). He competed in the men's long jump at the 1928 Summer Olympics.
