= Fernando Labourdette-Liaresq =

Personal information
- Full name: Fernando Labourdette-Liaresq Bonnecaze
- Nationality: Spanish
- Born: 2 December 1905

Sport
- Sport: Athletics
- Event: Long jump

Fernando Labourdette-Liaresq Bonnecaze (born 2 December 1905, date of death unknown) was a Spanish athlete. He competed in the men's long jump at the 1928 Summer Olympics.
