= Bob Kelley (triple jumper) =

American triple jumper

Personal information
- Nationality: American
- Born: July 17, 1897
- Died: May 24, 1965 (aged 67)

Sport
- Sport: Athletics
- Event: Triple jump

Bob Kelley (July 17, 1897 – May 24, 1965) was an American athlete. He competed in the men's triple jump at the 1928 Summer Olympics.
