= Al Bates =

American long jumper

Olympic medal record

Men's athletics

Representing the United States
Bronze medal – third place	1928 Amsterdam	Long jump

Alfred Hilborn Bates (April 24, 1905 – June 9, 1999) was an American athlete from Philadelphia Pennsylvania, who competed mainly in the long jump.

Bates won the IC4A indoor and outdoor long jump titles in 1927 and 1928, his winning mark of 24-10¾ (7.59) in the 1928 outdoor meet being the best of his career and remained the best mark in Penn State history until 1984.

He competed in the long jump for the United States in the 1928 Summer Olympics held in Amsterdam, Netherlands, winning the bronze medal with a jump of 7.40 meters. The Olympic gold medal went to USA's Ed Hamm (7.73m), whom Bates had beaten at the final trials; Haitian Silvio Cator (7.58m) won silver.

== See also ==
- List of Pennsylvania State University Olympians
