= Gijs Lamoree =

Dutch athlete

Personal information
- Nationality: Dutch
- Born: 3 October 1903 Schoonhoven, Netherlands
- Died: 13 October 1966 (aged 63) Leiden, Netherlands

Sport
- Sport: Athletics
- Events: Long jump Triple jump

Gijs Lamoree (3 October 1903 – 13 October 1966) was a Dutch athlete. He competed in the men's long jump and the men's triple jump at the 1928 Summer Olympics.
