= Erkki Järvinen =

Finnish triple jumper

Personal information
- Nationality: Finnish
- Born: 15 October 1904
- Died: 9 June 1991 (aged 86)

Sport
- Sport: Athletics
- Event: Triple jump

Erkki Järvinen (15 October 1904 – 9 June 1991) was a Finnish athlete. He competed in the men's triple jump at the 1928 Summer Olympics.
