= Helmut Schlöske =

German long jumper

Personal information
- Nationality: German
- Born: 27 June 1904
- Died: 9 October 1944 (aged 40)

Sport
- Sport: Athletics
- Event: Long jump

Helmut Schlöske (27 June 1904 – 9 October 1944) was a German athlete. He competed in the men's long jump at the 1928 Summer Olympics. He was killed in action during World War II.

In 1928, he achieved his personal best of 7.41 meters and, based on this performance, participated in the Olympic Games in Amsterdam along with Rudolf Dobermann, Erich Köchermann, and Willi Meier. There, he was unable to replicate this distance. While Meier and Köchermann advanced to the final of the top six with jumps of 7.39 meters and 7.35 meters, respectively, Helmut Schlöske didn't even surpass the 7-meter mark, managing only 6.99 meters, just ahead of the fourth German competitor, Rudolf Dobermann (6.91 meters). This placed him 15th overall, with the American Ed Hamm taking the victory.

Helmut Schlöske never placed in the long jump at the German Championships. However, he did win the German Championship in 1927 with the Charlottenburg 4x100-meter relay team.
