= Imre Fekete =

Hungarian athlete

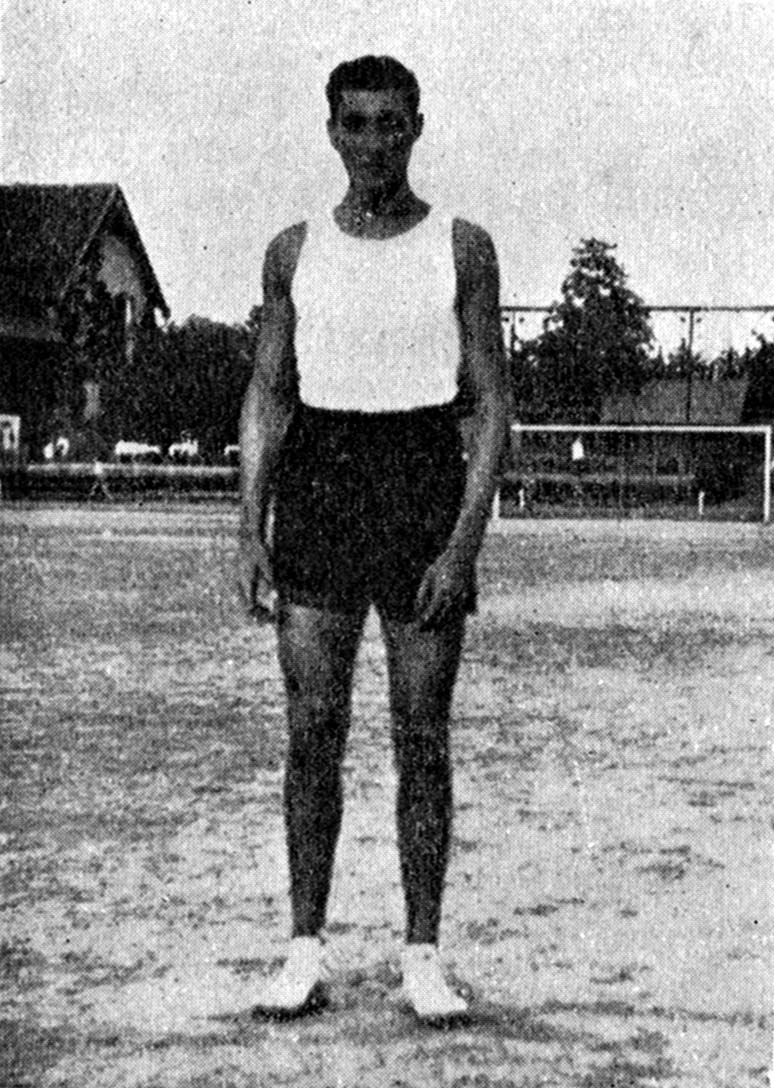

Personal information
- Nationality: Hungarian
- Born: 1 October 1906
- Died: 30 April 1945 (aged 38)

Sport
- Sport: Athletics
- Events: Long jump Triple jump

Imre Fekete (1 October 1906 – 30 April 1945) was a Hungarian athlete. He competed in the men's long jump and the men's triple jump at the 1928 Summer Olympics.
