= Willi Meier =

German long jumper

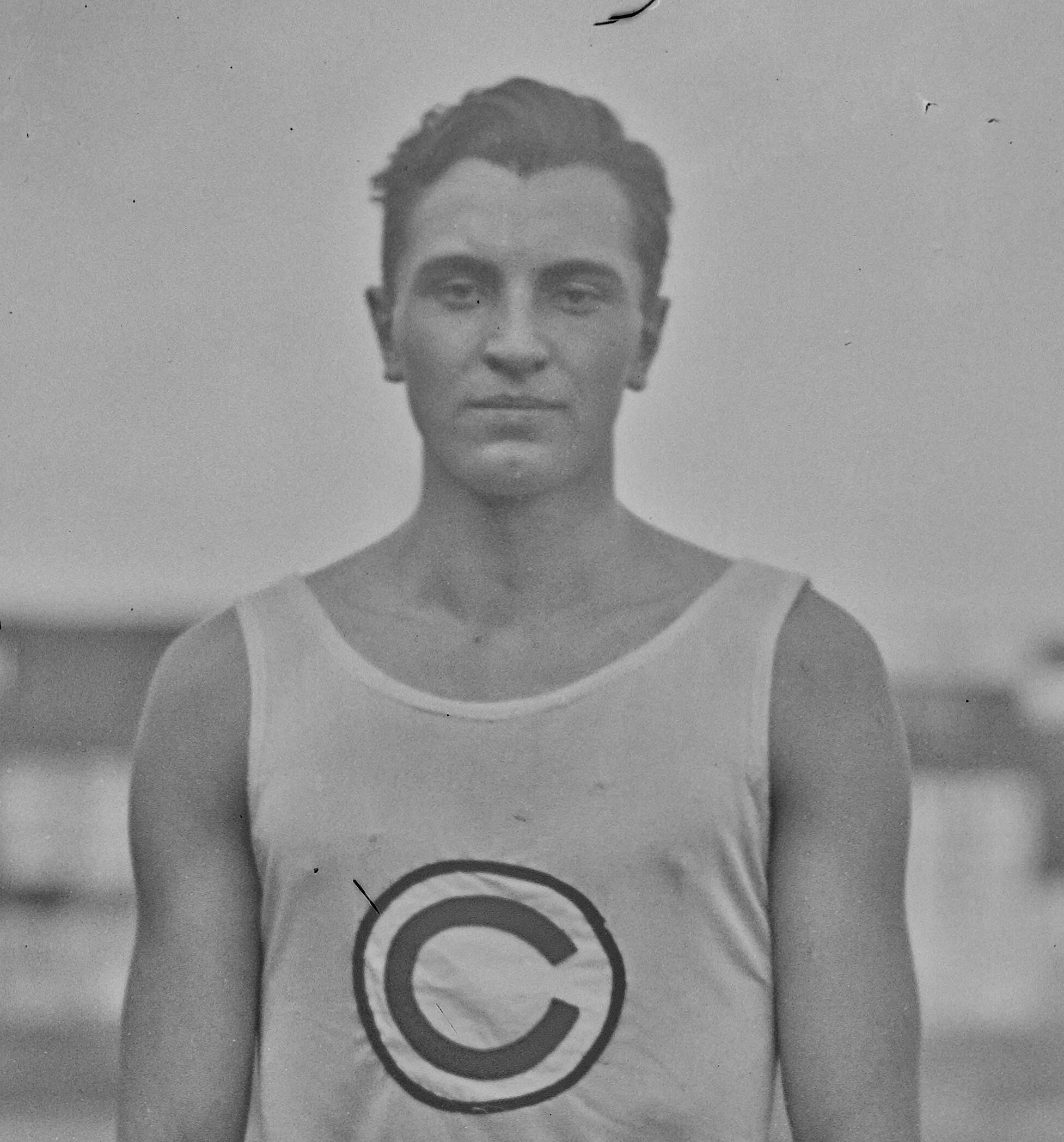
- Willi Meier in 1928

Personal information
- Nationality: German
- Born: 13 April 1907
- Died: 19 March 1979 (aged 71)

Sport
- Sport: Athletics
- Event: Long jump

Willi Meier (15 April 1907 – 19 March 1979) was a German athlete. He competed in the men's long jump at the 1928 Summer Olympics.
