= Esteban Crespo (athlete) =

Mexican long jumper

Personal information
- Full name: Esteban Crespo Najares
- Born: 13 April 1911 Tepic, Mexico

Sport
- Sport: Athletics
- Event: Long jump

Esteban Crespo (born 13 April 1911, date of death unknown) was a Mexican athlete. He competed in the men's long jump at the 1932 Summer Olympics.
