= Lloyd Bourgeois =

American triple jumper

Personal information
- Born: January 24, 1903 New Orleans, United States
- Died: September 19, 1968 (aged 65)

Sport
- Sport: Athletics
- Event: Triple jump

Lloyd Bourgeois (January 24, 1903 – September 19, 1968) was an American athlete. He competed in the men's triple jump at the 1928 Summer Olympics.
