= Weltklasse Zürich =

Swiss track and field invitational event

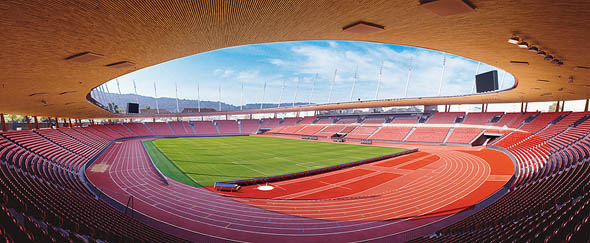
- The host stadium – Letzigrund
- Date: August – September
- Location: Zürich, Switzerland
- Event type: Track and field
- World Athletics Cat.: GW/DF
- Established: 12 August 1928; 98 years ago
- Website: Diamond League Zürich
- 2026 Weltklasse Zürich

Weltklasse Zürich (English: World Class Zurich) is an annual, invitation-only, world-class track and field meeting at the Letzigrund in Zürich, Switzerland, generally held at the end of August or beginning of September. Previously one of the IAAF Golden League events, it now serves as a final of the Wanda Diamond League, alongside Memorial Van Damme between 2010 and 2019. In 2021 and 2022, Weltklasse Zürich served as the sole final of the Diamond League, and this is also planned for 2025 and 2027. So far, 27 world records have been set at Weltklasse Zürich. In 1988, Carl Lewis won the 100-meter duel against Ben Johnson. The time of 9.93 seconds was upgraded to a world record a year later, following Johnson's doping case.

One of the first large-scale international athletics events (outside the Summer Olympics), it is sometimes referred to as the one-day Olympics. With a budget of about ten million Swiss francs, Weltklasse Zürich ranks among the most expensive events in athletics. Every year, it draws around 25,000 fans to Letzigrund Stadium, with competitions broadcast in up to 135 countries. Since 2014, Christoph Joho and Andreas Hediger have led the organization as co-directors.

Weltklasse Zürich first took place on 12 August 1928. In the beginning, the meeting was nicknamed by the public the "Nurmi meeting" after the most admired and celebrated participant at the time, Paavo Nurmi. On 21 June 1960, on the Letzigrund track, Armin Hary became the first human to run the 100 m dash in 10.0 seconds.

UBS has supported Weltklasse Zürich as its main sponsor since 1981. Other sponsors are Vaudoise Assurances, Migros, Le Gruyère Switzerland, Medica, Omega, Swiss, Lexus, Erdgas and Puma.

== History ==
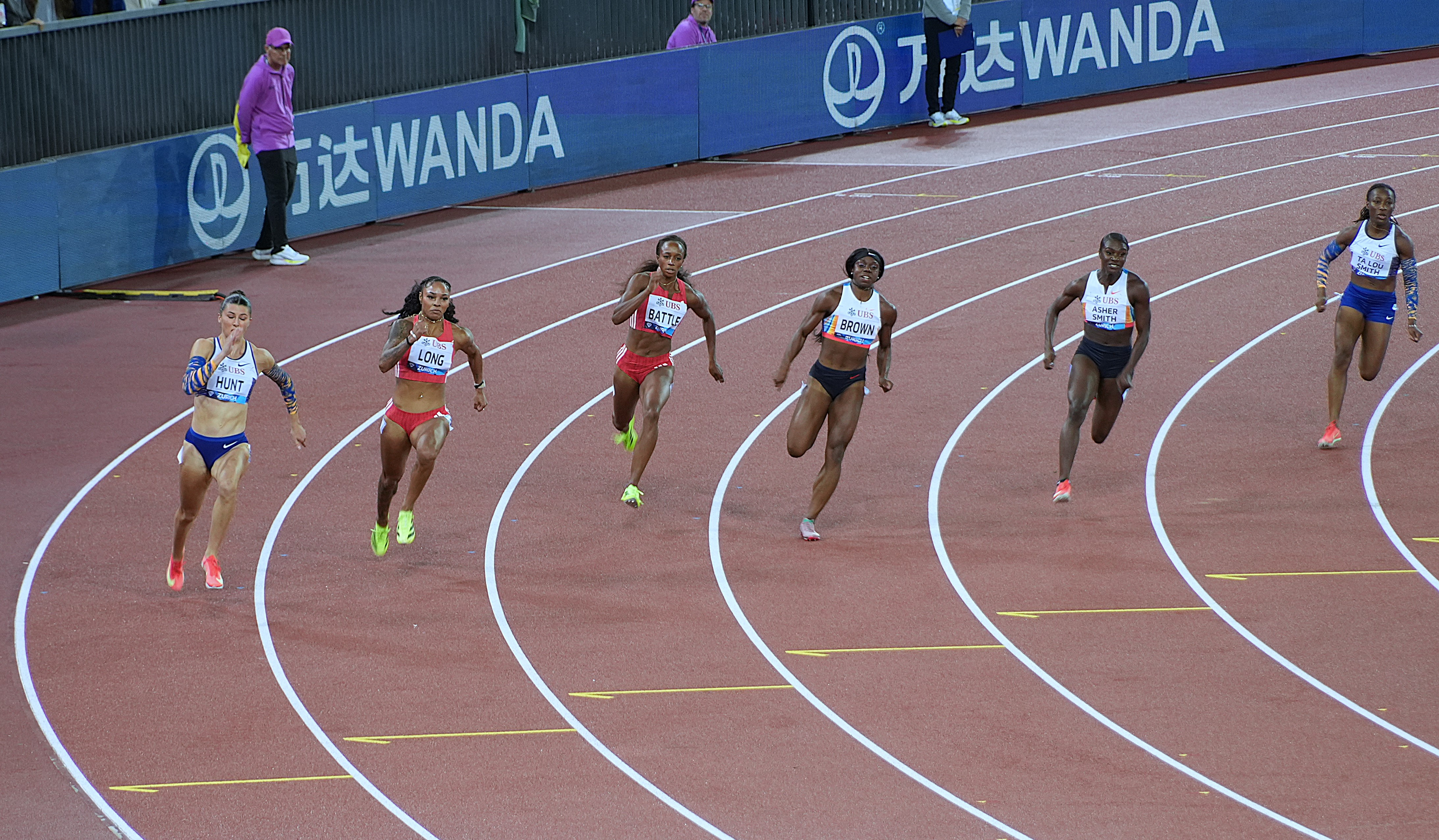
Wanda Diamond League - Zurich 2025

The meeting was conceived in 1924 by the athletic section of the FC Zürich which became the Leichtathletik Club Zürich in 1934, and was first held at the Letzigrund on a dirt track on 12 August 1928 as the Internationales Leichtathletik-Meeting in Zürich. Since 1935 it also became known as the "American Meeting", similar to the Bislett Games, and this continued into the 1950s. A notable hiatus occurred after the 1952 meeting until the rebuilt Letzigrund Stadium opened in 1958, although a meeting had still been planned for August 1954. The name "Weltklasse Zürich" was adopted in 1959. The meet would not be held regularly on an annual basis until 1973, and the Weltklasse introduced electronic timing the following year.

During 2020 the COVID-19 pandemic prevented Weltklasse Zürich from taking place, instead an event called Inspiration Games was held.

== Track surface ==
The first surface was made of dirt in 1928, and the first synthetic track surface in Europe was installed in 1968. The number of lanes was increased to eight in the early 1970s which forced the Weltklasse to be put on hold for two years for the construction to take place.

The current surface at the Letzigrund Stadium was developed in 2014 by the Swiss company CONICA. The new surface was installed in June 2014 at a cost of 800,000 CHF and was paid for by the city of Zurich, which owns Letzigrund Stadium.

== Editions ==
Some of the earliest editions were bilateral matches that are not counted among the 29 "Internationales" and Weltklasse meetings organized from 1928 til 1977.

Weltklasse Zürich editions
Ed.	Meeting	Series	Date	Ref.
	1928 Internationales Leichtathletik-Meeting		12 Aug 1928	
	1929 Internationales Leichtathletik-Meeting		13 Aug 1929	
	1932 Internationales Leichtathletik-Meeting		3 Sep 1932	
	1934 Internationales Leichtathletik-Meeting		12 Aug 1934	
	1935 Internationales Leichtathletik-Meeting		8 Aug 1935	
	1937 Internationales Leichtathletik-Meeting		29 Aug 1937	
	1939 Internationales Leichtathletik-Meeting		13 Aug 1939	
	1946 Internationales Leichtathletik-Meeting		18 Jul 1946	
	1947 Internationales Leichtathletik-Meeting		5 July 1947	
	1948 Internationales Leichtathletik-Meeting		21 Aug 1948	
	1949 Internationales Leichtathletik-Meeting		21 Aug 1949	
	1951 Internationales Leichtathletik-Meeting		19 Jun 1951	
	1951 Internationales Leichtathletik-Meeting		28 Jul 1951	
	1952 Internationales Leichtathletik-Meeting		12 Aug 1952	
	1958 Internationales Leichtathletik-Meeting		1 Jul 1958	
	1958 Internationales Leichtathletik-Meeting		17 Jul 1958	
1st	1959 Weltklasse Zürich		7 Jul 1959	
2nd	1960 Weltklasse Zürich		21 Jun 1960	
3rd	1961 Weltklasse Zürich		27 Jun 1961	
4th	1962 Weltklasse Zürich		10 Jul 1962	
5th	1963 Weltklasse Zürich		2 Jul 1963	
6th	1964 Weltklasse Zürich		23 Jun 1964	
7th	1965 Weltklasse Zürich		29 Jun 1965	
8th	1966 Weltklasse Zürich		30 Jun 1966	
9th	1967 Weltklasse Zürich		4 Jul 1967	
10th	1968 Weltklasse Zürich		2 Jul 1968	
11th	1969 Weltklasse Zürich		4 Jul 1969	
12th	1970 Weltklasse Zürich		3 Jul 1970	
13th	1973 Weltklasse Zürich		6 Jul 1973	
14th	1974 Weltklasse Zürich		16 Aug 1974	
15th	1975 Weltklasse Zürich		20 Aug 1975	
16th	1976 Weltklasse Zürich		18 Aug 1976	
17th	1977 Weltklasse Zürich		24 Aug 1977	
18th	1978 Weltklasse Zürich		16 Aug 1978	
19th	1979 Weltklasse Zürich		15 Aug 1979	
20th	1980 Weltklasse Zürich		13 Aug 1980	
21st	1981 Weltklasse Zürich		19 Aug 1981	
22nd	1982 Weltklasse Zürich		18 Aug 1982	
23rd	1983 Weltklasse Zürich		24 Aug 1983	
24th	1984 Weltklasse Zürich		22 Aug 1984	
25th	1985 Weltklasse Zürich	1985 IAAF Grand Prix	21 Aug 1985	
26th	1986 Weltklasse Zürich	1986 IAAF Grand Prix	13 Aug 1986	
27th	1987 Weltklasse Zürich	1987 IAAF Grand Prix	19 Aug 1987	
28th	1988 Weltklasse Zürich	1988 IAAF Grand Prix	17 Aug 1988	
29th	1989 Weltklasse Zürich	1989 IAAF Grand Prix	16 Aug 1989	
30th	1990 Weltklasse Zürich	1990 IAAF Grand Prix	15 Aug 1990	
31st	1991 Weltklasse Zürich	1991 IAAF Grand Prix	7 Aug 1991	
32nd	1992 Weltklasse Zürich	1992 IAAF Grand Prix	19 Aug 1992	
33rd	1993 Weltklasse Zürich	1993 IAAF Grand Prix	4 Aug 1993	
34th	1994 Weltklasse Zürich	1994 IAAF Grand Prix	17 Aug 1994	
35th	1995 Weltklasse Zürich	1995 IAAF Grand Prix	16 Aug 1995	
36th	1996 Weltklasse Zürich	1996 IAAF Grand Prix	14 Aug 1996	
37th	1997 Weltklasse Zürich	1997 IAAF Grand Prix	13 Aug 1997	
38th	1998 Weltklasse Zürich	1998 IAAF Golden League	12 Aug 1998	
39th	1999 Weltklasse Zürich	1999 IAAF Golden League	11 Aug 1999	
40th	2000 Weltklasse Zürich	2000 IAAF Golden League	11 Aug 2000	
41st	2001 Weltklasse Zürich	2001 IAAF Golden League	17 Aug 2001	
42nd	2002 Weltklasse Zürich	2002 IAAF Golden League	16 Aug 2002	
43rd	2003 Weltklasse Zürich	2003 IAAF Golden League	15 Aug 2003	
44th	2004 Weltklasse Zürich	2004 IAAF Golden League	6 Aug 2004	
45th	2005 Weltklasse Zürich	2005 IAAF Golden League	19 Aug 2005	
46th	2006 Weltklasse Zürich	2006 IAAF Golden League	18 Aug 2006	
47th	2007 Weltklasse Zürich	2007 IAAF Golden League	7 Sep 2007	
48th	2008 Weltklasse Zürich	2008 IAAF Golden League	29 Aug 2008	
49th	2009 Weltklasse Zürich	2009 IAAF Golden League	28 Aug 2009	
50th	2010 Weltklasse Zürich	2010 Diamond League	18–19 Aug 2010	
51st	2011 Weltklasse Zürich	2011 Diamond League	7–8 Sep 2011	
52nd	2012 Weltklasse Zürich	2012 Diamond League	29–30 Aug 2012	
53rd	2013 Weltklasse Zürich	2013 Diamond League	28–29 Aug 2013	
54th	2014 Weltklasse Zürich	2014 Diamond League	28 Aug 2014	
55th	2015 Weltklasse Zürich	2015 Diamond League	2–3 Sep 2015	
56th	2016 Weltklasse Zürich	2016 Diamond League	31 Aug, 1 Sep 2016	
57th	2017 Weltklasse Zürich	2017 Diamond League	23–24 Aug 2017	
58th	2018 Weltklasse Zürich	2018 Diamond League	29–30 Aug 2018	
59th	2019 Weltklasse Zürich	2019 Diamond League	28–29 Aug 2019	
	2020 Inspiration Games	2020 Diamond League	9 Jul 2020	
60th	2021 Weltklasse Zürich	2021 Diamond League	8–9 Sep 2021	
61st	2022 Weltklasse Zürich	2022 Diamond League	7–8 Sep 2022	
62nd	2023 Weltklasse Zürich	2023 Diamond League	30–31 Aug 2023	
63rd	2024 Weltklasse Zürich	2024 Diamond League	4–5 Sep 2024	
64th	2025 Weltklasse Zürich	2025 Diamond League	27–28 Aug 2025	
65th	2026 Weltklasse Zürich	2026 Diamond League	26–27 Aug 2026	

== World records ==
Over the course of its history, numerous world records have been set at Weltklasse Zürich.

World records set at the Weltklasse Zürich
Year	Event	Record	Athlete	Nationality
1959	200 m hurdles (bend)	22.5 h (+1.2 m/s)	Martin Lauer	West Germany
1959	120 yd hurdles	13.2 h (+1.9 m/s) / 13.56	Martin Lauer	West Germany
1959	110 m hurdles	13.2 h (+1.9 m/s) / 13.56	Martin Lauer	West Germany
1960	100 m	10.0 h	Armin Hary	West Germany
1969	110 m hurdles	13.2 h	Willie Davenport	United States
1973	110 m hurdles	13.1 h	Rod Milburn	United States
1975	Discus throw	70.20 m	Faina Melnik	Soviet Union
1979	1500 m	3:32.1 h	Sebastian Coe	United Kingdom
1980	1500 m	3:52.47	Tatyana Kazankina	Soviet Union
1981	Mile	3:48.53	Sebastian Coe	United Kingdom
1981	110 m hurdles	12.93 (−0.2 m/s)	Renaldo Nehemiah	United States
1984	100 m	10.76 (+1.7 m/s)	Evelyn Ashford	United States
1985	Mile	4:16.71	Mary Slaney	United States
1988	400 m	43.29	Harry ("Butch") Reynolds	United States
1989	110 m hurdles	12.92 (−0.1 m/s)	Roger Kingdom	United States
1991	4 × 100 m relay	37.67	Michael Marsh; Leroy Burrell; Dennis Mitchell; Carl Lewis	United States
1992	3000 m steeplechase	8:02.08	Moses Kiptanui	Kenya
1995	5000 m	12:44.39	Haile Gebrselassie	Ethiopia
1995	3000 m steeplechase	7:59.18	Moses Kiptanui	Kenya
1996	Mile	4:12.56	Svetlana Masterkova	Russia
1997	800 m	1:41.24	Wilson Kipketer	Denmark
1997	3000 m steeplechase	7:59.08	Wilson Boit Kipketer	Kenya
1997	5000 m	12:41.86	Haile Gebrselassie	Ethiopia
2006	100 m	9.77 (+1.0 m/s)	Asafa Powell	Jamaica
2009	Pole vault	5.06 m	Yelena Isinbayeva	Russia
2026	400 m hurdles	45.80	Alison dos Santos	Brazil
2026	100 m hurdles	12.09	Masai Russell	United States

== Meeting records ==
=== Men ===
Men's meeting records of the Weltklasse Zürich
Event	Record	Athlete	Nationality	Date	Meet	Ref.
100 m	9.76 (+1.4 m/s)	Yohan Blake	Jamaica	30 August 2012	2012	
200 m	19.52 (−0.6 m/s)	Noah Lyles	United States	8 September 2022	2022	
400 m	43.29	Harry ("Butch") Reynolds	United States	17 August 1988	1988	
800 m	1:41.24	Wilson Kipketer	Denmark	13 August 1997	1997	
1500 m	3:26.45	Hicham El Guerrouj	Morocco	12 August 1998	1998	
Mile	3:45.19	Noureddine Morceli	Algeria	16 August 1995	1995	
3000 m	7:27.43	Parker Wolfe	United States	27 August 2026	2026	
5000 m	12:41.86	Haile Gebrselassie	Ethiopia	13 August 1997	1997	
110 m hurdles	12.92 (−0.1 m/s)	Roger Kingdom	United States	16 August 1989	1989	
110 m hurdles	12.92 (+0.3 m/s)	Cordell Tinch	United States	28 August 2025	2025	
400 m hurdles	45.80 WR	Alison dos Santos	Brazil	27 August 2026	2026	
3000 m steeplechase	7:56.54	Saif Saeed Shaheen	Qatar	18 August 2006	2006	
3000 m steeplechase	7:53.17 X	Brahim Boulami	Morocco	16 August 2002	2002	
High jump	2.40 m	Charles Austin	United States	7 August 1991	1991	
Pole vault	6.25 m (outdoor)	Armand Duplantis	Sweden	27 August 2026	2026	
Pole vault	5.92 m (indoor) (Note: Competition held at Zurich's main train station)	Shawnacy Barber	Canada	2 September 2015	2015	
Long jump	8.65 m (−0.5 m/s) DLR	Juan Miguel Echevarría	Cuba	29 August 2019	2019	
Triple jump	17.80 m (+0.1 m/s)	Christian Taylor	United States	1 September 2016	2016	
Shot put	23.23 m (outdoor) DLR	Joe Kovacs	United States	7 September 2022	2022	
Shot put	22.03 m (indoor)	Ryan Whiting	United States	28 August 2013	2013	
Discus throw	71.12 m	Virgilijus Alekna	Lithuania	11 August 2000	2000	
Hammer throw	83.24 m	Andrey Abduvaliyev	Uzbekistan	17 August 1994	1994	
Javelin throw	94.42 m (old design)	Uwe Hohn	East Germany	21 August 1985	1985	
Javelin throw	92.28 m (current design)	Raymond Hecht	Germany	14 August 1996	1996	
4 × 100 m relay	37.45 DLR	Trell Kimmons; Wallace Spearmon; Tyson Gay; Michael Rodgers	United States	19 August 2010	2010	

=== Women ===
Women's meeting records of the Weltklasse Zürich
Event	Record	Athlete	Nationality	Date	Meet	Ref.	Video
100 m	10.65 (+0.6 m/s)	Elaine Thompson-Herah	Jamaica	9 September 2021	2021		
100 m	10.65 (−0.8 m/s)	Shelly-Ann Fraser-Pryce	Jamaica	8 September 2022	2022		
200 m	21.66 (−1.0 m/s)	Merlene Ottey	Jamaica	15 August 1990	1990		
400 m	48.70	Salwa Eid Naser	Bahrain	28 August 2025	2025		
800 m	1:53.70 DLR	Audrey Werro	Switzerland	27 August 2026	2026		
1000 m	2:32.70	Jolanta Januchta	Poland	19 August 1981	1981		
1500 m	3:52.47	Tatyana Kazankina	Soviet Union	13 August 1980	1980		
Mile	4:12.56	Svetlana Masterkova	Russia	14 August 1996	1996		
3000 m	8:22.34	Almaz Ayana	Ethiopia	3 September 2015	2015		
5000 m	14:09.52	Beatrice Chebet	Kenya	5 September 2024	2024		
100 m hurdles	12.09 (±0.0 m/s) WR	Masai Russell	United States	27 August 2026	2026		
400 m hurdles	52.13	Anna Cockrell	United States	27 August 2026	2026		
3000 m steeplechase	8:55.29	Ruth Jebet	Bahrain	24 August 2017	2017		
High jump	2.05 m	Mariya Lasitskene	ANA	8 September 2021	2021		
Pole vault	5.06 m (outdoor) WR	Yelena Isinbayeva	Russia	28 August 2009	2009		
Pole vault	4.91 m (indoor)	Nina Kennedy	Australia	30 August 2023	2023		
Long jump	7.39 m (+0.3 m/s)	Heike Drechsler	East Germany	21 August 1985	1985		
Triple jump	15.48 m (+0.3 m/s)	Yulimar Rojas	Venezuela	9 September 2021	2021		
Shot put	20.31 m (outdoor)	Lijiao Gong	China	29 August 2019	2019		
Shot put	20.98 m (indoor)	Valerie Adams	New Zealand	28 August 2013	2013		
Discus throw	70.20 m	Faina Melnik	Soviet Union	20 August 1975	1975		
Javelin throw	70.40 m (old design)	Petra Felke	East Germany	13 August 1986	1986		
Javelin throw	69.57 m (current design)	Christina Obergföll	Germany	8 September 2011	2011		
4 × 100 m relay	41.60	Sherone Simpson; Natasha Morrison; Elaine Thompson; Shelly-Ann Fraser-Pryce	Jamaica	3 September 2015	2015		

== See also ==
- Athletissima
- Spitzen Leichtathletik Luzern
