= Arild Lenth =

Norwegian long and triple jumper

Arild Lenth (20 November 1904 – 28 March 1972) was a Norwegian long jumper and triple jumper.

His personal best long jump was 7.18 metres, achieved in July 1928 on Bislett stadion. In August 1928 at the same stadium he jumped 14.11 metres in the triple jump, another career best. At the 1928 Summer Olympics he competed in the long and triple jump. In the long jump he achieved 6.60 metres and failed to reach the final; in the triple jump he achieved 13.39 metres and again failed to reach the final. He became Norwegian champion in the long jump in 1928 and 1929, representing Hamar IL. He also won the national bronze medal in 1927. He became Norwegian triple jump champion once, in 1928. He did not hold the triple jump club record in Hamar IL, as Lauritz G. Bryhn had jumped 14.28 metres in 1921.

Lenth chaired the club Hamar IL from 1946 to 1947. Together with Guri Bakke (1910–1989) he had the son Borger Arildssøn Lenth (b. 1937), a jurist and banker.
