= Theo Phelan =

Irish triple jumper

Personal information
- Full name: Theobald Denis Phelan
- Nationality: Irish
- Born: 12 September 1908
- Died: 7 April 1970 (aged 61)

Sport
- Sport: Athletics
- Events: Triple jump, 100m hurdles
- Club: UCD

Achievements and titles
- Personal bests: Triple jump: 14.25m (Dublin, 1928) 110m hurdles: 15.2 (Alexandria, 1935)
Medal record
Representing Ireland
Tailteann Games
Gold medal – first place	1932 Dublin	110 metres hurdles

Theo Phelan (12 September 1908 – 7 April 1970) was an Irish athlete. He competed in the men's triple jump at the 1928 Summer Olympics.
