= Alex Munroe =

Canadian athletics competitor

Personal information
- Nationality: Canadian
- Born: 14 August 1908
- Died: 3 October 1987 (aged 79) near Pickering, Ontario, Canada

Sport
- Sport: Athletics
- Events: Triple jump High jump

Alexander Wood Munroe (14 August 1908 – 3 October 1987) was a Canadian athlete. He competed in the men's triple jump and the men's high jump at the 1928 Summer Olympics.
