= Levi Casey (athlete) =

American triple jumper (1904–1983)

Medal record

Men's athletics

Representing the United States

Olympic Games
Silver medal – second place	1928 Amsterdam	Triple jump

Levi Burnside "Lee" Casey (October 19, 1904 – April 1, 1983) was an American athlete who competed mainly in the triple jump. He was born in Vienna, Illinois.

He competed for the United States in the 1928 Summer Olympics held in Amsterdam, Netherlands in the Triple jump where he won the silver medal.
