= Charles Alzieu =

French long jumper

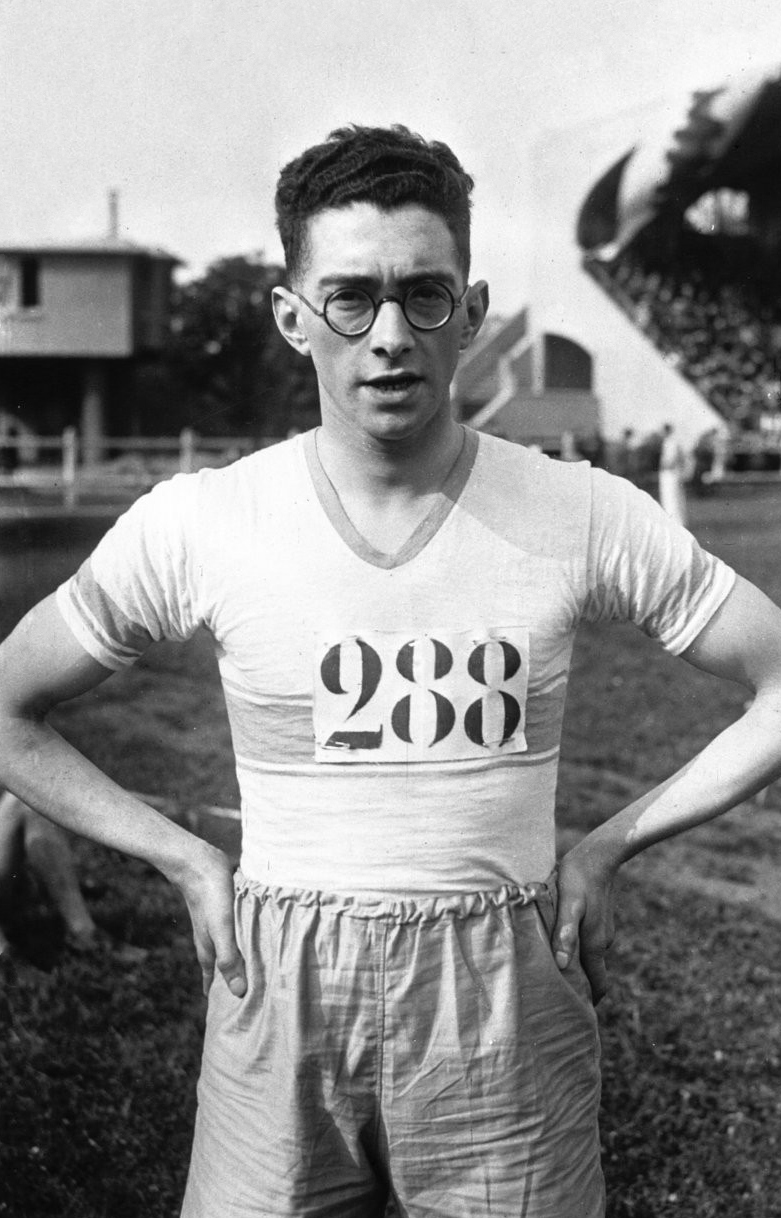
- Alzieu in 1928

Personal information
- Born: 6 November 1904 Elbeuf, France
- Died: 14 September 1963 (aged 58) Bordeaux, France

Sport
- Sport: Athletics
- Event: Long jump
- Club: CASG Bordeaux

Achievements and titles
- Personal best: 7.06 m (1929)

Charles Alzieu (6 November 1904 – 14 September 1963) was a French long jumper. He competed at the 1928 Summer Olympics and finished 27th.
