= Willy Weibel =

Swiss sprinter

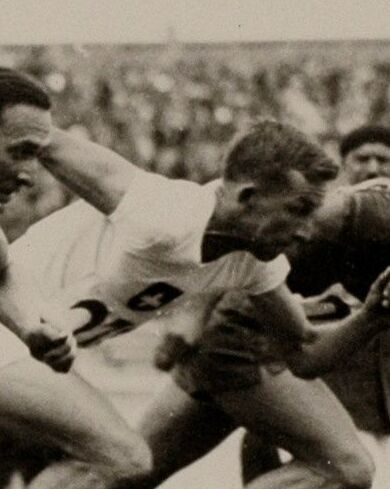
- Willy Weibel in 1928

Personal information
- Nationality: Swiss
- Born: 21 September 1906
- Died: April 1990 (aged 83)

Sport
- Sport: Sprinting
- Event: 100 metres

Willy Weibel (21 September 1906 – April 1990) was a Swiss sprinter. He competed in the men's 100 metres at the 1928 Summer Olympics.
