= Lambert Redd =

American long jumper (1908–1986)

Olympic medal record

Men's athletics

Representing the United States
Silver medal – second place	1932 Los Angeles	Long jump

Charles Lambert Redd (February 18, 1908 – February 1, 1986) was an American athlete, who competed mainly in the long jump. Redd competed for the United States in the 1932 Summer Olympics held in Los Angeles, where he won the silver medal in the long jump.

Representing the Bradley Braves, Redd won the long jump and triple jump at the 1932 NCAA Track and Field Championships. He also played football and basketball for Bradley.
