= Werner Nüesch =

Swiss athlete

Personal information
- Nationality: Swiss
- Born: 1904
- Died: 1954 (aged 49–50)

Sport
- Sport: Athletics
- Event(s): Shot put Discus

Werner Nüesch (1904 – 1954) was a Swiss athlete. He competed in the men's shot put at the 1924 Summer Olympics and the 1928 Summer Olympics.
