= Jakob Schüller =

German sprinter

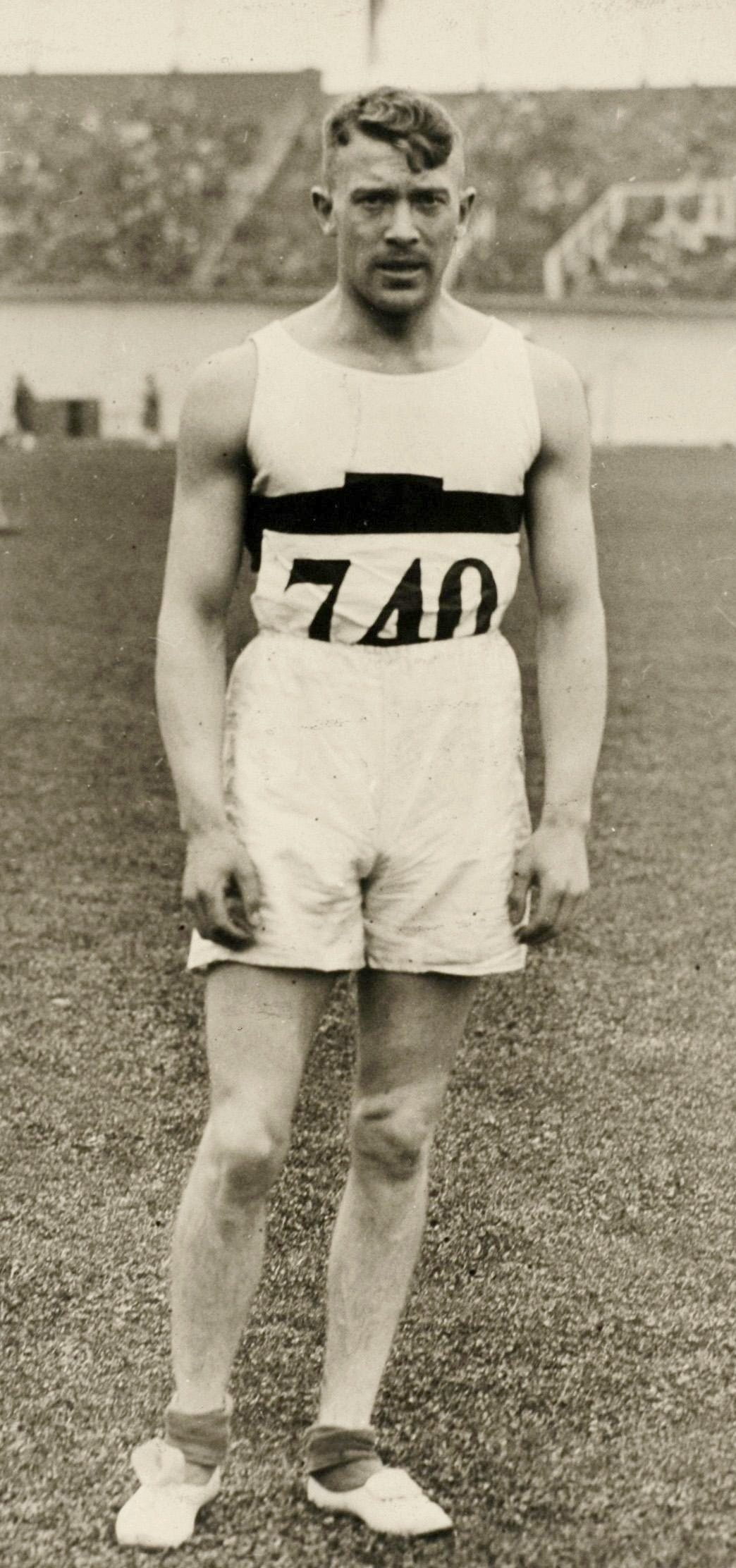
- Jakob Schüller at the 1928 Olympics

Personal information
- Born: 26 June 1905 Duisburg, Germany
- Died: 22 January 1944 (aged 38)
- Height: 1.77 m (5 ft 10 in)
- Weight: 72 kg (159 lb)

Sport
- Sport: Running
- Club: KTSV Preussen 1855, Krefeld

Achievements and titles
- Olympic finals: 1928

Jakob Schüller (26 June 1905 – 22 January 1944) was a German sprint runner. He competed at the 1928 Olympics in the 200 m and finished in sixth place. He was killed in action during World War II.
