= Emmanuel Goldsmith =

Swiss sprinter (1909–1990)

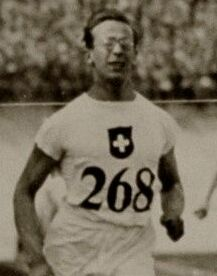
- Emmanuel Goldsmith in 1928

Personal information
- Nationality: Swiss
- Born: 21 October 1909
- Died: 29 December 1990 (aged 81)

Sport
- Sport: Sprinting
- Event: 100 metres

Emmanuel Goldsmith (21 October 1909 – 29 December 1990) was a Swiss sprinter. He competed in the men's 100 metres at the 1928 Summer Olympics.
