= Unia Tarnów (sports club) =

Unia Tarnów was a Polish multi-sports club, based in Tarnów, Poland, whose legacy is continued by several separate club still carrying the same name.

The club was stablished in 1928 as a football club, which continues to play to this day, and athletics club. The club is best known for its motorcycle speedway team, founded in 1957, becoming independent in 2001. Over time many sections of the club have become independent entities in their own right but keeping the historical name. Since the last re-organisation in 2010 all sections of the club had become independent with the exception of the football and athletics sections. By 2013 only the football club was left and had therefore de facto ceased to exist as a multi-sports club. The football club did however create a futsal section in 2019.

== Sections ==
=== Athletics ===
The athletics was one of the founding sections of the club in 1928, dating its roots to before that. In the inaugural year the country was represented by its athlete Zdzisław Nowak at the Olympic Games in Paris. After restructuring in 2010 it was one of only two sections (the other was football) left in the club. The section was sold to a state school in 2013.

=== Association football ===
The football section currently plays in the fourth tier of the Polish football league.

=== Basketball ===
The basketball section has produced many well-known players such as Jarosław Jechorek, Radosław Hyży, William Brantley, Toree Morris, Marcin Stokłosa, Wojciech Majchrzak, Bartosz Sarzało, Iwo Kitzinger, Wojciech Żurawski, Lewis Lofton, Chaz Carr, Dražen Tomić, Łukasz Seweryn, Brandun Hughes, Michael Ansley, Piotr Szczotka, Adrian Małecki and Piotr Szybilski.

=== Fencing ===
The fencing section came into existence when the local club dating back to 1955 joined the parent club Unia in 1961. The section was disbanded in 1976 due to cost-cutting, although attempts to carry on the legacy of the club under different names as an independent club lasted until 1983.

=== Futsal ===
Unia also has a futsal team administered by the football section of the club. Founded in 2019, it is the youngest section of the club.

=== Handball ===
It was founded in 1960 as an independent youth club. Between 1978-2010 the club was part of the parent sports club. It reverted to the "Unia" name in 2021 but remained a separate club.

=== Motorcycle speedway ===
The motorcycle speedway section are the most successful section of the club, having been multiple time champions.

=== Swimming ===
The swimming section was active as an independent club since re-organisation of the parent club in 2010, but only lasted until 2012 before dropping the historic name. Between 1969-1979 the section in total; broke 153 national records, won 236 nation championship medals, of which 101 were gold; and won 3 medals at the Universiade.
