= Alfred Sutter =

Swiss long jumper

Personal information
- Nationality: Swiss
- Born: 20 May 1906

Sport
- Sport: Athletics
- Event: Long jump

Alfred Sutter (born 20 May 1906, date of death unknown) was a Swiss athlete. He competed in the men's long jump at the 1928 Summer Olympics.
