= Väinö Rainio =

Finnish long and triple jumper

Personal information
- Nationality: Finnish
- Born: 30 April 1896
- Died: 28 July 1979 (aged 83)

Sport
- Sport: Athletics
- Event(s): Long jump Triple jump

Väinö Rainio (30 April 1896 – 28 July 1979) was a Finnish athlete. He competed at the 1924 Summer Olympics and the 1928 Summer Olympics.
