= Ed Gordon (long jumper) =

American long jumper

Olympic medal record

Men's athletics

Representing the United States
Gold medal – first place	1932 Los Angeles	Long jump

Edward Lansing Gordon Jr. (July 1, 1908 – September 5, 1971) was an American athlete, who competed mainly in the long jump.

He was born in Jackson, Mississippi, and died in Detroit, Michigan.

Gordon was a student-athlete and graduated from the University of Iowa. At Iowa, Gordon was also an accomplished high jumper, finishing runner-up in that event at the 1929 NCAA Track and Field Championships.

At the 1928 Summer Olympics, he finished seventh in the long jump competition.

He competed for the United States in the 1932 Summer Olympics held in Los Angeles, United States, where he won the gold medal in the long jump.

His son Edward Lansing Gordon III is the current host of Our World with Black Enterprise and has worked for BET, CBS News, NBC News, and NPR.
