= James Cohen =

British athlete (1906–1958)

Personal information
- Nationality: British (English)
- Born: 6 May 1906 Southwark, England
- Died: 14 March 1958 (aged 51) Westminster, London England

Sport
- Sport: Athletics
- Event: long jump
- Club: University of Cambridge AC; Achilles Club
Medal record
Men's Athletics
Representing England
British Empire Games
Silver medal – second place	1930 Hamilton	4×110 yards

Horace James Cohen (6 May 1906 – 14 March 1958) was an English athlete who competed at the 1928 Summer Olympics.

== Biography ==
Cohen was educated at Trinity Hall, Cambridge.

At the 1928 Olympic Games in Amsterdam. he finished 39th in the Olympic long jump event.

Cohen became the national long jump champion after winning the British AAA Championships title at the 1929 AAA Championships.

At the 1930 British Empire Games he won the silver medal with the English relay team in the 4×110 yards competition. In the long jump contest he finished sixth.

He died in Westminster.
