= Paddy Anglim =

Irish long jumper

Personal information
- Nationality: Irish
- Born: 6 September 1904 Rosegreen, Tipperary, Ireland
- Died: 3 March 1954 (aged 49)
- Height: 172 cm (5 ft 8 in)
- Weight: 64 kg (141 lb)

Sport
- Sport: Athletics
- Event: Long jump
- Club: Clonmel Athletic and Cycling Club

Achievements and titles
- Personal bests: 7.47m (Tipperary, 1934)

Paddy Anglim (6 September 1904 – 3 March 1954) was an Irish athlete who competed at the 1928 Summer Olympics.

== Biography ==
At the 1928 Olympic Games in Amsterdam, Anglim competed in the men's long jump finishing in 21st place.

Anglim finished second behind Robert Evans in the long jump event at the British 1932 AAA Championships.
