= Vilho Tuulos =

Finnish athletics elite competitor (1895–1967)

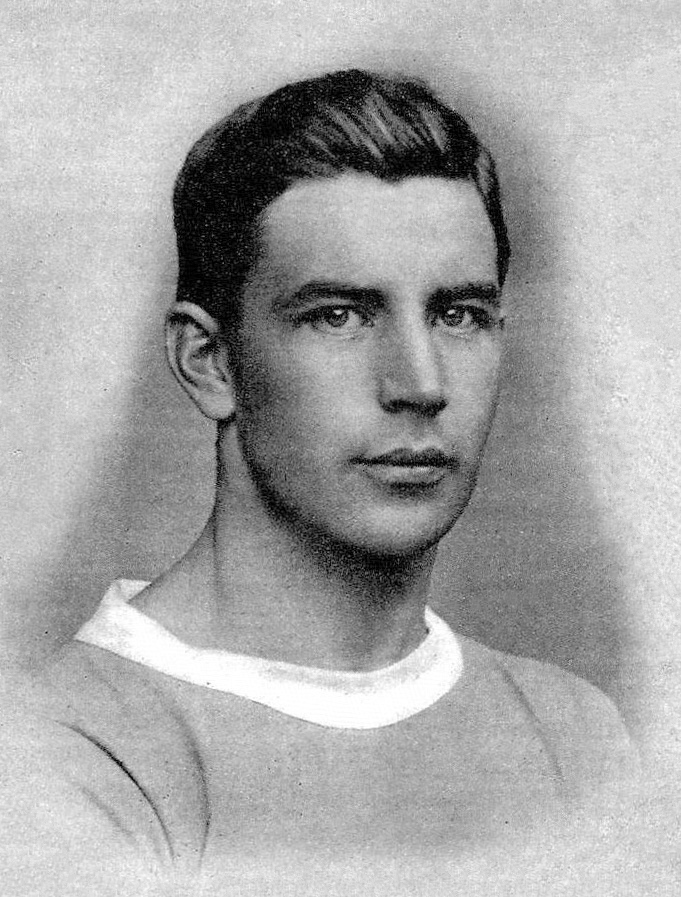
- Vilho Tuulos in 1920

Personal information
- Born: 26 March 1895 Tampere, Grand Duchy of Finland, Russian Empire
- Died: 2 September 1967 (aged 72) Tampereen, Finland
- Height: 183 cm (6 ft 0 in)
- Weight: 77 kg (170 lb)

Sport
- Sport: Athletics
- Events: Long jump, triple jump
- Club: Tampereen Pyrintö

Achievements and titles
- Personal bests: LJ – 7.31 m (1923); TJ – 15.48 m (1923)
Medal record
Representing Finland
Olympic Games
Gold medal – first place	1920 Antwerp	Triple jump
Bronze medal – third place	1924 Paris	Triple jump
Bronze medal – third place	1928 Amsterdam	Triple jump

Vilho "Ville" Immanuel Tuulos (26 March 1895 – 2 September 1967) was a Finnish triple jumper and long jumper, who won a gold medal at the 1920 Summer Olympics in Antwerp.

== Career ==
At the 1920 Olympic Games, Tuulos won a gold medal in the triple jump. The 14.50-meter jumps he made during the qualifying round were counted for the main event and were enough for the win.

Tuulos won the British AAA Championships title in the triple jump event and finished third behind Charles Hoff in the long jump event at the 1922 AAA Championships.

Tuulos won bronze medals at the 1924 and 1928 Olympics. In the long jump, his best result was a fourth place at the 1924 Olympics.

Tuulos improved the European record in triple jump twice: on 20 July 1919 in Tampere with a result of 15.30 meters and on 6 July 1923 in Borås with 15.48 metres. The latter result stayed as the European record for over sixteen years, until Kaare Strøm jumped 15.49 metres in 1939.

Tuulos also won 12 Finnish titles, nine in the triple jump (1919–25, 1927–28), two in the long jump (1921, 1923), and one in the high jump (1923).

Tuulos was the uncle of the Olympic figure skater Kalle Tuulos. He died in Tampere, aged 72.
