= Rudi Dobermann =

German athletics competitor

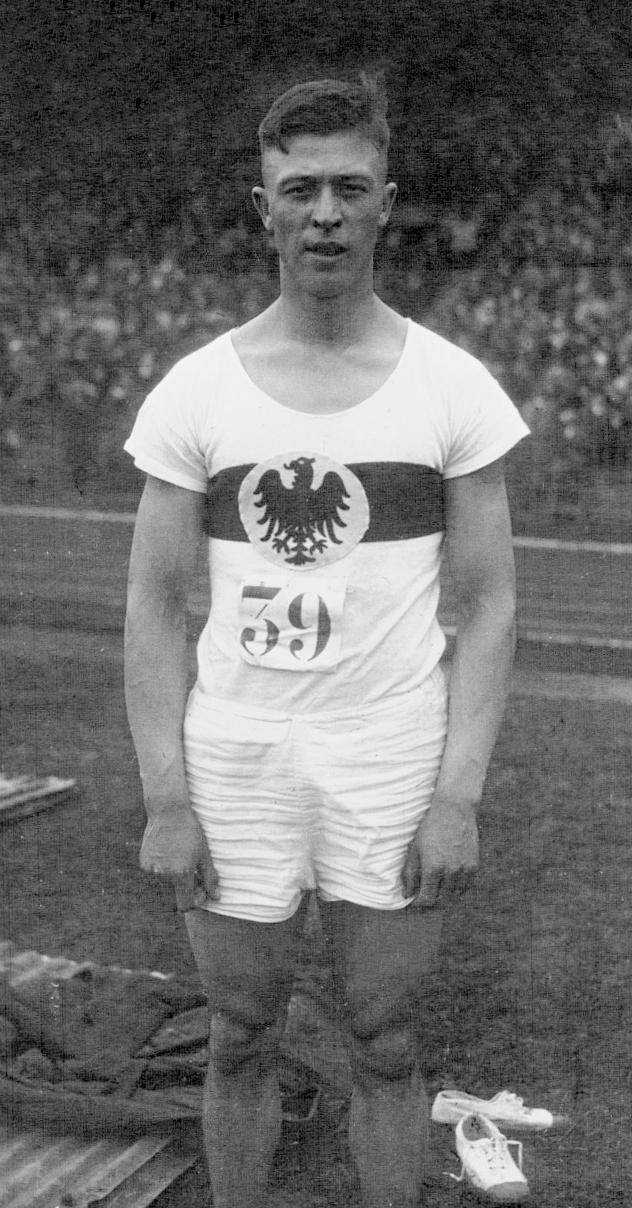
- Dobermann in 1927

Personal information
- Born: 14 December 1902 Iserlohn, Germany
- Died: 1 November 1979 (aged 76) São Paulo, Brazil
- Height: 181 cm (5 ft 11 in)
- Weight: 72 kg (159 lb)

Sport
- Sport: Athletics
- Events: Long jump, shot put, sprint
- Club: Sportclub Köln-Marienburg

Achievements and titles
- Personal bests: LJ – 7.64 m (1928); SP – 14.80 m (1930); 100 m – 10.7 (1926)

Rudolf Dobermann (14 December 1902 – 1 November 1979) was a German athlete. He competed in the long jump at the 1928 Summer Olympics and finished 18th. His club was the Marienburger SC of Cologne.

== Biography ==
Dobermann first trained in gymnastics and then changed to athletics, winning the German long jump title in 1925–1927; he finished third in the shot put in 1930.

Dobermann won the British AAA Championships title in the long jump event at the 1927 AAA Championships.

He set a European record at 7.64 m in 1928. In 1930 he immigrated to São Paulo, Brazil, where he first worked as a coach with the German School (Escola Allemã), with which he won the state college athletics championships (campeonato collegial de athletismo) of 1931. He was also one of the three coaches for the athletes of the state of São Paulo which participated in the Latin-American Championships (or Games) of the same year. From 1934 he was a coach and official with the Brazilian Athletics Confederation. Later he became a businessman.
