= Hannes de Boer =

Dutch long jumper (1899–1982)

Personal information
- Nationality: Dutch
- Born: 2 December 1899 Hollum, Friesland, Netherlands
- Died: 2 April 1982 (aged 81) Rijswijk, Zuid-Holland, Netherlands

Sport
- Sport: Athletics
- Event: long jump
- Club: Te Werve, Rijswijk

Hannes de Boer (2 December 1899 – 2 April 1982) was a Dutch long jumper. He took part in the Olympic Games of 1924 and 1928. He finished in sixth place in 1928, jumping a distance of 6.32m.

== Biography ==
De Boer was born in Hollum, on the West Frisian island of Ameland. He won six Dutch national titles in the long jump and set six Dutch records. The longest jump, 7.37m reached in 1928, would only be broken in 1951.

De Boer was also a member of the Dutch 4 x 100 metres relay team that set a national record in 1926. This record was broken in 1934 by a relay team that included Chris Berger and Tinus Osendarp.

He won the British AAA Championships title in the long jump event at the 1928 AAA Championships and the 1931 AAA Championships. Shortly after the 1928 AAAs, he represented the Netherlands at his second Olympic Games in Amsterdam, Netherlands.

He worked as an office clerk, but later became a cameraman for Dutch cinema newsreels. He died in Rijswijk, near The Hague, in 1982.

== Honours ==
- Dutch national long jump title: 6

1925, 1926, 1927, 1928, 1929, 1930

== Dutch national records ==
Event	Distance	Date	Location
Long jump	7.04m	27 July 1924	Dordrecht
Long jump	7.18m	19 July 1925	Haarlem
Long jump	7.215m	8 August 1926	Haarlem
Long jump	7.30m	7 August 1927	Haarlem
Long jump	7.32m	30 August 1931	Rijswijk
Long jump	7.37m *	6 July 1928	London
