= Enrico Torre =

Italian sprinter

Personal information
- Nationality: Italian
- Born: 7 October 1901 Bagni di Lucca, Italy
- Died: 31 May 1975 (aged 73) Italy

Sport
- Country: Italy
- Sport: Athletics
- Event(s): Sprint; Long jump
- Club: Cantoni Coats Lucca

Achievements and titles
- Personal bests: 100 m: 10.9 (1924); Long jump: 7.13 m (1927)

Enrico Torre (7 October 1901 – 31 May 1975) was an Italian sprinter and long jumper. Torre participated at two editions of the Summer Olympics (1924 and 1928).

== National titles ==
Enrico Torre has won three time the individual national championship.

- 1 win on 200 metres (1925)
- 1 win on Long jump (1927)
- 1 win on Pentathlon (1934)

== See also ==
- 200 metres winners of Italian Athletics Championships
