= Carl Sautter =

American screenwriter

Carl Sautter (April 29, 1948 - February 23, 1993) was a writer born in the United Kingdom.

Sautter wrote for television series including Trapper John, M.D. on CBS, Moonlighting on ABC and Beverly Hills, 90210 on FOX. He also contributed to Hanna-Barbera's Jetsons: The Movie.

== Biography ==
A graduate of Pomona (Claremont Colleges), Sautter started his professional life with a Coro Foundation scholarship in urban planning in Pasadena, California. It was during the time of government largess through President Lyndon Johnson's Poverty Program, and Carl was instrumental in creating the foundation for many nonprofit government/private programs in housing, child welfare, community organization--the results of many of which are still operative in the San Gabriel Valley. About five years into this, he became inspired to write a script for a television comedy, "Three's Company." Which was terrible. He took the rejection well--and decided screenwriting was a skill he could master. He did, but it took seven years of failure before his writing career took off. Cognizant of the difficulties other writers have in breaking into the entertainment industry, Sautter shared his knowledge, instructing screenwriting workshops, including Selling to Hollywood, the New Writers Awards (sponsored by NBC), the Hawaii International Film Festival, and more.

With encouragement from his classes, he wrote a book, "How To Sell Your Screenplay," published by New Chapter Press (New York) in 1988; a paperback edition was published in 1992.

Sautter's last major project was as writer and story advisor for the 1993 Italian television series Lucky Luke, based on a French comic book character. The series featured a largely American cast but was never broadcast in the United States.

Carl Sautter died at his home in West Hollywood on February 23, 1993, at the age of 44. He was a huge fan and occasional judge of professional figure skaters; at his memorial, he was honored by the 1979 World Champions Tai Babilonia and Randy Gardner, who skated to "You Are The Wind Beneath My Wings."

In the mid-1990s, the Scriptwriter's Network created the Carl Sautter Memorial Screenwriting Competition as well as the Producer's Outreach Program for Television.
