= Adolf Meier =

Swiss athlete

Personal information
- Nationality: Swiss
- Born: 12 February 1902
- Died: 10 January 1949 (aged 46)

Sport
- Sport: Athletics
- Event(s): Long jump Decathlon

Adolf Meier (12 February 1902 – 10 January 1949) was a Swiss athlete. He competed at the 1924 Summer Olympics and the 1928 Summer Olympics.
