= Erich Köchermann =

German long jumper

Personal information
- Nationality: German
- Born: 21 May 1904
- Died: 21 July 1964 (aged 60)

Sport
- Sport: Athletics
- Event: Long jump

Erich Köchermann (21 May 1904 – 21 July 1964) was a German athlete. He competed in the men's long jump at the 1928 Summer Olympics and the 1932 Summer Olympics.
