= Czechoslovakia at the 1928 Summer Olympics =

- IOC code: TCH
- NOC: Czechoslovak Olympic Committee

in Amsterdam
- Competitors: 70 in 14 sports
- Flag bearer: Josef Effenberger
- Medals Ranked 14th: Gold 2 Silver 5 Bronze 2 Total 9

Summer Olympics appearances (overview)
- 1920; 1924; 1928; 1932; 1936; 1948; 1952; 1956; 1960; 1964; 1968; 1972; 1976; 1980; 1984; 1988; 1992

Other related appearances
- Bohemia (1900–1912); Czech Republic (1994–pres.); Slovakia (1994–pres.)

Czechoslovakia competed at the 1928 Summer Olympics in Amsterdam, Netherlands. 70 competitors (69 men and 1 woman) took part in 51 events in 14 sports.

== Medalists ==
Medal	Name	Sport	Event	Date
Gold	František Ventura	Equestrian	Individual jumping	August 12
Gold	Ladislav Vácha	Gymnastics	Men's parallel bars	August 9
Silver	Jan Heřmánek	Boxing	Men's middleweight	August 11
Silver	Josef Effenberger, Jan Gajdoš, Jan Koutný, Emanuel Löffler, Bedřich Šupčík, Ladislav Tikal, Ladislav Vácha, Václav Veselý	Gymnastics	Men's team all-around	August 10
Silver	Ladislav Vácha	Gymnastics	Men's rings	August 8
Silver	Emanuel Löffler	Gymnastics	Men's vault	August 10
Silver	Jindřich Maudr	Wrestling	Men's Greco-Roman bantamweight	August 4
Bronze	Emanuel Löffler	Gymnastics	Men's rings	August 8
Bronze	Jaroslav Skobla	Weightlifting	Men's +82.5 kg	July 29

== Aquatics ==
=== Diving ===
2 divers, both men, represented Czechoslovakia in 1928. It was the nation's 2nd appearance in the sport. Both men competed only in the 3 metre springboard event; neither reached the final. Balasz placed 4th in his semifinal group, just missing the top 3 needed to advance.

Diver	Event	Semifinals			Final		
Diver	Event	Points	Score	Rank	Points	Score	Rank
Julius Balasz	Men's 3 m board	20	139.24	4	did not advance		
Josef Nasvadba	Men's 3 m board	38	102.48	8	did not advance		

=== Swimming ===
One male swimmer represented Czechoslovakia in 1928. It was the nation's 3rd appearance in the sport, in which it had competed each time it appeared at the Games. Antoš had been a member of the 1924 team as well. He placed 3rd in the preliminary heats in both of his events, not advancing to the semifinals in either.

Swimmer	Event	Heat		Semifinal		Final	
Swimmer	Event	Time	Rank	Time	Rank	Time	Rank
Václav Antoš	Men's 400 m freestyle	5:39.8	3	did not advance			
Václav Antoš	Men's 1500 m freestyle	22:43.0	3	did not advance			

=== Water polo ===
Czechoslovakia competed in water polo for the third time in 1928. The team was defeated by Great Britain in the first round.

Summary

Team	Event	Round of 16	Quarterfinal	Semifinal	Final / BM	
Team	Event	Opposition Score	Opposition Score	Opposition Score	Opposition Score	Rank
Czechoslovakia men's	Men's tournament	Great Britain; L 4–2	did not advance			9

==== Men's tournament ====
Team roster

Head coach:

No.	Pos.	Player	DoB	Age	Caps	Club	Tournament games	Tournament goals
	GK	Josef Bušek	28 August 1901	26	?		1	0
		Kurt Epstein	21 January 1904	22	?		1	0
		František Getreuer			?		1	0
		Hugo Klempfner			?		0	0
		J. Kroc			?		0	0
		A. Novotny			?		0	0
		Michal Schmuck	9 January 1909	19	?		1	0
		František Schulz			?		1	1
		Pavol Steiner	29 March 1908	20	?		1	0
		Ladislav Švehla			?		1	0
		Josef Tomášek			?		0	0

Round of 16

4 August 1928	OR p. 807	Czechoslovakia	2–4	Great Britain	Amsterdam; Referees: J.A. Ruddy (USA)
4 August 1928	OR p. 807	Scoring by half: 0–1, 2–3			Amsterdam; Referees: J.A. Ruddy (USA)

== Athletics ==
11 athletes, all men, represented Czechoslovakia in 1928. It was the nation's 3rd appearance in the sport, in which Czechoslovakia had competed each time it appeared at the Games. Kittel's 8th place in the men's 1500 metres was the best result for Czechoslovak athletes in Amsterdam.

Track and road events

Athlete	Event	Heat		Quarterfinal		Semifinal		Final	
Athlete	Event	Result	Rank	Result	Rank	Result	Rank	Result	Rank
Johann Bartl	Men's 100 metres	Unknown	3	did not advance					
Karel Kněnický	Men's 100 metres	11.3	3	did not advance					
Jaroslav Vykoupil	Men's 100 metres	Unknown	2 Q	Unknown	6	did not advance			
Johann Bartl	Men's 200 metres	Unknown	5	did not advance					
Karel Kněnický	Men's 200 metres	Unknown	2 Q	Unknown	5	did not advance			
Jaroslav Vykoupil	Men's 200 metres	Unknown	3	did not advance					
Johann Bartl	Men's 400 metres	Unknown	2 Q	Unknown	3	did not advance			
Jaroslav Vykoupil	Men's 400 metres	Unknown	3	did not advance					
Adolf Kittel	Men's 800 metres	—N/a		1:59.6	4	did not advance			
Vilém Šindler	Men's 800 metres	—N/a		1:57.0	3 Q	Unknown	7	did not advance	
Adolf Kittel	Men's 1500 metres	—N/a				Unknown	2 Q	4:00.4	8
Vilém Šindler	Men's 1500 metres	—N/a				Unknown	4	did not advance	
Jozef Koščak	Men's 5000 metres	—N/a				15:42.0	8	did not advance	
Karel Nedobitý	Men's 5000 metres	—N/a				DNF	–	did not advance	
Karel Nedobitý	Men's 10,000 metres	—N/a						Unknown	17
Otakar Jandera	Men's 110 metres hurdles	—N/a		Unknown	2	Unknown	6	did not advance	
Johann Bartl	Men's 4 × 400 metres relay	—N/a				Unknown	5	did not advance	
Karel Kněnický	Men's 4 × 400 metres relay	—N/a				Unknown	5	did not advance	
Vilém Šindler	Men's 4 × 400 metres relay	—N/a				Unknown	5	did not advance	
Jaroslav Vykoupil	Men's 4 × 400 metres relay	—N/a				Unknown	5	did not advance	
Alois Krof	Men's marathon	—N/a						2:43:18	16
František Zyka	Men's marathon	—N/a						2:52:42	33

Field events

Athlete	Event	Qualification		Final	
Athlete	Event	Distance	Position	Distance	Position
František Douda	Men's shot put	13.12	14	did not advance	
František Douda	Men's discus throw	41.19	20	did not advance	

== Boxing ==
3 boxers, all men, represented Czechoslovakia in 1928. It was the nation's debut appearance in the sport. Jan Heřmánek won the silver medal in the middleweight class; the other two boxers each lost their first bout.

Boxer	Event	Round of 32	Round of 16	Quarterfinals	Semifinals	Final / Bronze match	
Boxer	Event	Opposition Result	Opposition Result	Opposition Result	Opposition Result	Opposition Result	Rank
Tomáš Pötsch	Men's lightweight	Stephen Halaiko (USA); L KO	did not advance				17
František Nekolný	Men's welterweight	Bye	Galataud (FRA); L points	did not advance			9
Jan Heřmánek	Men's middleweight	Bye	Georges Pixius (LUX); W points	Harry Henderson (USA); W points	Fred Mallin (GBR); W points	Piero Toscani (ITA); L points	2nd place, silver medalist(s)

== Cycling ==
Four cyclists, all men and all road cyclists, represented Czechoslovakia in 1928. It was the nation's 3rd appearance in the sport, in which Czechoslovakia had competed each time the nation appeared at the Games. Honig had the best time of the team, placing 39th in the individual road race. The combined score of the top 3 placed them 11th among the 15 competing nations.

=== Road cycling ===
Cyclist	Event	Time	Rank
Ladislav Brůžek	Men's road race	5:54:07	59
Antonín Honig	Men's road race	5:27:45	39
Antonín Perič	Men's road race	5:34:30	46
Josef Šídlo	Men's road race	5:34:30	46
Antonín Honig	Men's team road race	16:36:45	11
Antonín Perič	Men's team road race	16:36:45	11
Josef Šídlo	Men's team road race	16:36:45	11

== Equestrian ==
9 equestrians, all men, competed for Czechoslovakia in 1928. It was the nation's 2nd appearance in the sport. Czechoslovakia was one of 5 nations to have the maximum 3 riders in each event. František Ventura won gold in the individual jumping, Czechoslovakia's first equestrian medal. Emanuel Thiel, who had had the nation's best result in 1924 at 6th in the individual dressage, bettered his own performance to 5th in 1928.

=== Dressage ===
Equestrian	Horse	Event	Final	
Equestrian	Horse	Event	Score	Rank
Jaroslav Hanf	Elegán	Dressage	201.70	17
Otto Schöninger	Ex	Dressage	210.28	10
Emanuel Thiel	Loki	Dressage	225.96	5
Jaroslav Hanf	Elegán	Team dressage	642.18	5
Otto Schöninger	Ex	Team dressage	642.18	5
Emanuel Thiel	Loki	Team dressage	642.18	5

=== Eventing ===
Equestrian	Horse	Event	Final	
Equestrian	Horse	Event	Score	Rank
Josef Charous	Engadin	Eventing	1844.44	16
Josef Seyfried	Ekul	Eventing	DNF	–
František Statečný	Fesák	Eventing	DNF	–
Josef Charous	Engadin	Team eventing	1844.44	12
Josef Seyfried	Ekul	Team eventing	1844.44	12
František Statečný	Fesák	Team eventing	1844.44	12

=== Jumping ===
Equestrian	Horse	Event	Final			1st re-ride		2nd re-ride	
Equestrian	Horse	Event	Time	Penalties	Rank	Penalties	Rank	Penalties	Rank
Rudolf Popler	Denk	Jumping	DQ		–	did not advance			
Josef Rabas	Daghestan	Jumping	2:14	22.5	41	did not advance			
František Ventura	Eliot	Jumping	1:34	0	1	0	1	0	1st place, gold medalist(s)
Rudolf Popler	Denk	Team jumping	DQ		–	—N/a			
Josef Rabas	Daghestan	Team jumping	DQ		–	—N/a			
František Ventura	Eliot	Team jumping	DQ		–	—N/a			

== Fencing ==
Seven fencers, six men and one woman, represented Czechoslovakia in 1928. It was the nation's 3rd appearance in the sport, in which Czechoslovakia had competed each time it participated in the Games. It was the first time Czechoslovakia had a female fencer, Jarmila Chalupová. Chalupová had the most individual success of any Czechoslovak fencer in 1928, reaching the semifinals.

Fencer	Event	Round 1		Quarterfinals		Semifinals		Final	
Fencer	Event	Result	Rank	Result	Rank	Result	Rank	Result	Rank
Jan Černohorský	Men's épée	4 wins	7	did not advance					
František Kříž	Men's épée	3 wins	7	did not advance					
Josef Jungmann	Men's épée	3 wins	6 Q	5 wins	8	did not advance			
Miroslav Beznoska	Men's team épée	1–1	2 Q	1–1	2 Q	1–2	3	did not advance	
Jan Černohorský	Men's team épée	1–1	2 Q	1–1	2 Q	1–2	3	did not advance	
Martin Harden	Men's team épée	1–1	2 Q	1–1	2 Q	1–2	3	did not advance	
Josef Jungmann	Men's team épée	1–1	2 Q	1–1	2 Q	1–2	3	did not advance	
František Kříž	Men's team épée	1–1	2 Q	1–1	2 Q	1–2	3	did not advance	
Jan Tille	Men's team épée	1–1	2 Q	1–1	2 Q	1–2	3	did not advance	
Jarmila Chalupová	Women's foil	—N/a		5 wins	2 Q	1 win	7	did not advance	

== Gymnastics ==
Bohumil Mořkovský, bronze medalist on Vault and 13th-place finisher in the Individual All-Around at the previous Olympics in Paris, died on July 16, 1928, less than a month before he could make a repeat Olympic appearance. 8 gymnasts, all men, represented Czechoslovakia in 1928. It was the nation's 3rd appearance in the sport as well as the Games. The team took the silver medal, 6.375 points behind Germany, with Ladislav Vácha having the best individual all-around result at 9th place. Vácha also won gold in the parallel bars and silver in the rings. Emanuel Löffler took two apparatus medals as well, the silver in the vault and bronze in the rings.

=== Artistic gymnastics ===
Gymnast	Event	Score	Rank
Josef Effenberger	Men's all-around	238.875	14
Jan Gajdoš	Men's all-around	240.625	13
Jan Koutný	Men's all-around	225.250	31
Emanuel Löffler	Men's all-around	227.625	28
Bedřich Šupčík	Men's all-around	233.250	20
Ladislav Tikal	Men's all-around	217.750	37
Ladislav Vácha	Men's all-around	242.500	10
Václav Veselý	Men's all-around	242.875	9
Josef Effenberger	Men's team all-around	1712.250	2nd place, silver medalist(s)
Jan Gajdoš	Men's team all-around	1712.250	2nd place, silver medalist(s)
Jan Koutný	Men's team all-around	1712.250	2nd place, silver medalist(s)
Emanuel Löffler	Men's team all-around	1712.250	2nd place, silver medalist(s)
Bedřich Šupčík	Men's team all-around	1712.250	2nd place, silver medalist(s)
Ladislav Tikal	Men's team all-around	1712.250	2nd place, silver medalist(s)
Ladislav Vácha	Men's team all-around	1712.250	2nd place, silver medalist(s)
Václav Veselý	Men's team all-around	1712.250	2nd place, silver medalist(s)
Josef Effenberger	Men's horizontal bar	55.50	9
Jan Gajdoš	Men's horizontal bar	51.25	33
Jan Koutný	Men's horizontal bar	52.25	31
Emanuel Löffler	Men's horizontal bar	54.00	16
Bedřich Šupčík	Men's horizontal bar	54.25	14
Ladislav Tikal	Men's horizontal bar	46.75	50
Ladislav Vácha	Men's horizontal bar	54.75	12
Václav Veselý	Men's horizontal bar	52.00	32
Josef Effenberger	Men's parallel bars	52.25	15
Jan Gajdoš	Men's parallel bars	53.75	4
Jan Koutný	Men's parallel bars	52.25	31
Emanuel Löffler	Men's parallel bars	52.50	14
Bedřich Šupčík	Men's parallel bars	53.75	4
Ladislav Tikal	Men's parallel bars	50.50	24
Ladislav Vácha	Men's parallel bars	56.50	1st place, gold medalist(s)
Václav Veselý	Men's parallel bars	50.25	25
Josef Effenberger	Men's pommel horse	54.00	10
Jan Gajdoš	Men's pommel horse	54.00	10
Jan Koutný	Men's pommel horse	42.75	56
Emanuel Löffler	Men's pommel horse	52.00	17
Bedřich Šupčík	Men's pommel horse	51.50	19
Ladislav Tikal	Men's pommel horse	45.50	49
Ladislav Vácha	Men's pommel horse	47.00	45
Václav Veselý	Men's pommel horse	46.50	47
Josef Effenberger	Men's rings	52.00	22
Jan Gajdoš	Men's rings	54.25	8
Jan Koutný	Men's rings	52.50	18
Emanuel Löffler	Men's rings	56.50	3rd place, bronze medalist(s)
Bedřich Šupčík	Men's rings	54.75	6
Ladislav Tikal	Men's rings	48.75	41
Ladislav Vácha	Men's rings	57.50	2nd place, silver medalist(s)
Václav Veselý	Men's rings	52.75	15
Josef Effenberger	Men's vault	25.125	46
Jan Gajdoš	Men's vault	27.375	12
Jan Koutný	Men's vault	26.750	26
Emanuel Löffler	Men's vault	28.500	2nd place, silver medalist(s)
Bedřich Šupčík	Men's vault	19.000	78
Ladislav Tikal	Men's vault	26.250	32
Ladislav Vácha	Men's vault	27.125	18
Václav Veselý	Men's vault	26.375	30

== Modern pentathlon ==
Three pentathletes represented Czechoslovakia in 1928. It was the nation's 2nd appearance in the sport. Růžička had the best finish for Czechoslovakia to date, placing 30th.

Pentathlete	Event	Shooting	Swimming	Fencing	Running	Equestrian	Total	
Pentathlete	Event	Rank	Rank	Rank	Rank	Rank	Score	Rank
Kamil Gampe	Men's individual	37	30	37	37	9	150	37
Rudolf Růžička	Men's individual	21	25	19	28	34	127	30
Josef Schejbal	Men's individual	34	36	13	31	30	144	35

== Rowing ==
1 rower competed for Czechoslovakia in 1928. It was the nation's 2nd appearance in the sport, and 1st since 1920. Josef Straka, whose son would compete in the Olympics in 1972 and 1976, reached the third round in the single sculls before being eliminated.

Rower	Event	Round 1		Repechage 1		Round 2		Repechage 2		Round 3		Semifinals		Final	
Rower	Event	Time	Rank	Time	Rank	Time	Rank	Time	Rank	Time	Rank	Time	Rank	Time	Rank
Josef Straka	Men's single sculls	8:05.2	1 Q	Bye		8:36.4	1 Q	Bye		8:04.8	2	did not advance			

== Sailing ==
A single male sailor represented Czechoslovakia in 1928. It was the nation's 2nd appearance in the sport. Winter finished 18th in the preliminary round standings, not advancing to the final.

Dinghy

Sailor	Event	Preliminary series				Net points	Prelim rank	Final series				Net points	Final rank
Sailor	Event	1	2	3	4	Net points	Prelim rank	1	2	3	4	Net points	Final rank
Rudolf Winter	12' Dinghy	10	10 RET	6	8	34	18	did not advance					

== Weightlifting ==
Six weightlifters, all men, represented Czechoslovakia in 1928. It was the nation's third appearance in the sport, in which Czechoslovakia had competed each time it appeared at the Olympics. Skobla, who had placed 8th in light heavyweight (−82.5 kg) in 1924, won the bronze medal in heavyweight (+82.5 kg) this time. This matched the nation's best-ever result in the sport to date.

Lifter	Event	Press		Snatch		Clean & Jerk		Total	Rank
Lifter	Event	Result	Rank	Result	Rank	Result	Rank	Total	Rank
Josef Vacek	Men's −60 kg	80	5	82.5	4	100	13	262.5	8
Josef Matějček	Men's −67.5 kg	82.5	7	77.5	13	107.5	11	265	11
Jan Kostrba	Men's −75 kg	80	16	85	12	115	9	280	11
Bohumil Sýkora	Men's −75 kg	70	20	85	12	115	9	270	17
Václav Pšenička	Men's −82.5 kg	100	1	105	3	130	6	335	5
Jaroslav Skobla	Men's +82.5 kg	100	8	107.5	4	147.5	2	357.5	3rd place, bronze medalist(s)

== Wrestling ==
Six wrestlers, all men, represented Czechoslovakia in 1928. All six competed in the Greco-Roman discipline. It was the nation's 3rd appearance in the sport as well as the Games. Jindřich Maudr won the nation's first Olympic medal in wrestling, taking silver in the bantamweight after reaching a de facto gold medal final against the German Leucht.

Greco-Roman

Athlete	Event	Round 1	Round 2	Round 3	Round 4	Round 5	Round 6	Round 7	Rank
Athlete	Event	Opposition Result	Opposition Result	Opposition Result	Opposition Result	Opposition Result	Opposition Result	Opposition Result	Rank
Jindřich Maudr	Men's bantamweight	Andersen (DEN); W Decision 1pt	Kamel (EGY); W Fall 1pt	van Maaren (NED); W Decision 2pts	Gozzi (ITA); W Decision 3pts	Lindelöf (SWE); W Fall 3pts	Leucht (GER); L Fall 6pts	—N/a	2nd place, silver medalist(s)
František Kratochvíl	Men's featherweight	Egeberg (NOR); W Decision 1pt	Väli (EST); L Fall 4pts	Kárpáti (HUN); L Decision 7pts	did not advance				13
Vladimír Vávra	Men's lightweight	Sperling (GER); W Fall 0pts	Mumenthaler (SUI); W Fall 0pts	Borges (DEN); W Fall 0pts	Yalaz (TUR); L Fall 3pts	Keresztes (HUN); L Fall 6pts	did not advance		5
František Hala	Men's middleweight	Papp (HUN); L Decision 3pts	Frantz (LUX); W Fall 3pts	Johansson (SWE); W Fall 3pts	Kokkinen (FIN); L Fall 6pts	did not advance		—N/a	6
Josef Vávra	Men's light heavyweight	Juhasz (YUG); W Decision 1pt	Szalay (HUN); L Decision 4pts	Appels (BEL); L Fall 7pts	did not advance			—N/a	9
Josef Urban	Men's heavyweight	Colpaert (BEL); W Fall 0pts	Simonis (NED); W Fall 0pts	Donati (ITA); W Fall 0pts	Svensson (SWE); L Fall 3pts	Wiesberger (AUT); L Decision 6pts	Did not advance	—N/a	5
