= Athletics at the 1928 Summer Olympics – Men's 200 metres =

Men's 200 metres at the Games of the IX Olympiad
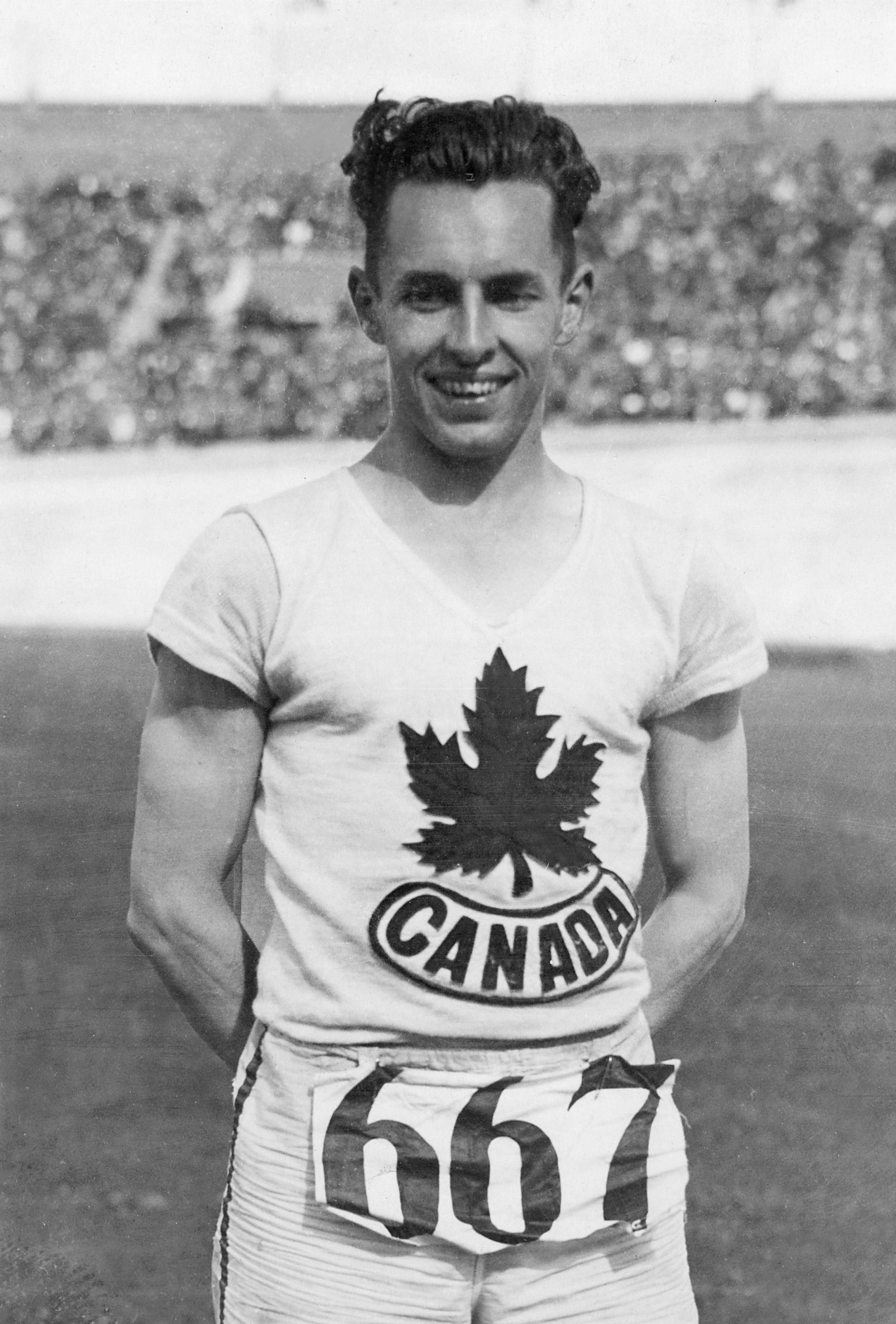
- Percy Williams
- Venue: Olympic Stadium
- Dates: July 31, 1928 (heats and quarterfinals); August 1, 1928 (semifinals and final)
- Competitors: 59 from 29 nations
- Winning time: 21.8

Medalists
1st place, gold medalist(s)		Percy Williams; Canada
2nd place, silver medalist(s)		Walter Rangeley; Great Britain
3rd place, bronze medalist(s)		Helmut Körnig; Germany

The men's 200 metres was an event at the 1928 Summer Olympics in Amsterdam. It was held on 31 July and 1 August 1928 at the Olympic Stadium. There were 59 competitors from 29 nations. Nations had been limited to 4 athletes each since 1920. The event was won by 0.1 seconds by Percy Williams of Canada, the nation's second victory in the event (after 1908). The win broke a streak of three victories by the United States; with no Americans on the podium, the nation's six-Games medal streak was broken as well. Walter Rangeley of Great Britain took silver, giving Great Britain a four-Games medal streak in the event. Germany earned its first men's 200 metres medal with Helmut Körnig's bronze.

== Background ==
This was the seventh appearance of the event, which was not held at the first Olympics in 1896 but has been on the program ever since. Two of the six finalists from the 1924 Games returned: gold medalist Jackson Scholz and two-time silver medalist Charley Paddock, both of the United States. Scholz was a slight favorite, but the Americans had not won any medals in the 100 metres earlier in Amsterdam and the winner of that event, Canada's Percy Williams, was a strong contender for a double in this event.

Lithuania and Romania each made their debut in the event. The United States made its seventh appearance, the only nation to have competed at each edition of the 200 metres to date.

== Competition format ==
The competition used the four round format introduced in 1920: heats, quarterfinals, semifinals, and a final. There were 15 heats of between 2 and 6 runners each, with the top 2 men in each advancing to the quarterfinals. The quarterfinals consisted of 6 heats of 5 athletes each; the two fastest men in each heat advanced to the semifinals. There were 2 semifinals, each with 6 runners. In that round, the top three athletes advanced. The final had 6 runners. The races were run on a now-standard 400 metre track.

== Records ==
Prior to this competition, the existing world and Olympic records were as follows:

World record				
Olympic record	Archie Hahn (USA)	21.6	St. Louis, United States	31 August 1904

No new world or Olympic records were set during the competition. Helmut Körnig tied the Olympic record in the last quarterfinal.

== Schedule ==
Date	Time	Round
Friday, 31 July 1928	14:50; 17:15	Heats; Quarterfinals
Saturday, 1 August 1928	14:00; 15:50	Semifinals; Final

== Results ==
=== Heats ===
15 heats were held; the fastest two in each heat advanced to Round Two.

==== Heat 1 ====
Rank	Athlete	Nation	Time	Notes
1	Henry Cumming	United States	22.4	Q
2	André Mourlon	France	Unknown	Q
3	André Théard	Haiti	Unknown	
4	Willy Weibel	Switzerland	Unknown	
5	Diego Ordóñez	Spain	Unknown	
6	Ladislau Peter	Romania	Unknown	

==== Heat 2 ====
Rank	Athlete	Nation	Time	Notes
1	Björn Kugelberg	Sweden	22.4	Q
2	Maurice Degrelle	France	Unknown	Q
3	Donald Cullen	Ireland	Unknown	
4	Renos Frangoudis	Greece	Unknown	

==== Heat 3 ====
Rank	Athlete	Nation	Time	Notes
1	John Fitzpatrick	Canada	22.8	Q
2	Jimmy Carlton	Australia	22.8	Q
3	Juan Serrahima	Spain	Unknown	
4	Ronald Burns	India	Unknown	
5	Alejandro Hannig	Chile	Unknown	

==== Heat 4 ====
Rank	Athlete	Nation	Time	Notes
1	Jakob Schüller	Germany	22.0	Q
2	Rinus van den Berge	Netherlands	Unknown	Q
3	François Prinsen	Belgium	Unknown	
4	Hans Niggl	Switzerland	Unknown	

==== Heat 5 ====
Rank	Athlete	Nation	Time	Notes
1	Charlie Paddock	United States	22.2	Q
2	Mario Gómez	Mexico	22.5	Q
3	Anselmo Gonzaga	Philippines	22.7	
4	Adolphe Groscol	Belgium	23.8	

==== Heat 6 ====
Rank	Athlete	Nation	Time	Notes
1	Jackson Scholz	United States	22.2	Q
2	Ralph Adams	Canada	22.5	Q
3	Iwao Aizawa	Japan	22.6	
4	Sean Lavan	Ireland	22.9	

==== Heat 7 ====
Rank	Athlete	Nation	Time	Notes
1	Charley Borah	United States	25.0	Q
2	Hermann Schlöske	Germany	25.0	Q

==== Heat 8 ====
Rank	Athlete	Nation	Time	Notes
1	André Cerbonney	France	22.2	Q
2	Paul Brochart	Belgium	Unknown	Q
3	Ferenc Gerő	Hungary	Unknown	
4	James Hall	India	Unknown	
5	Johann Bartl	Czechoslovakia	Unknown	
6	Francisco Costas	Mexico	Unknown	

==== Heat 9 ====
Rank	Athlete	Nation	Time	Notes
1	Wilfred Legg	South Africa	22.4	Q
2	Alberto Barucco	Argentina	Unknown	Q
3	Haris Šveminas	Lithuania	Unknown	
—	George Hester	Canada	DSQ	

==== Heat 10 ====
Rank	Athlete	Nation	Time	Notes
1	Helmut Körnig	Germany	23.4	Q
2	Karel Knenicky	Czechoslovakia	Unknown	Q
3	Jean Moulin	Luxembourg	Unknown	

==== Heat 11 ====
Rank	Athlete	Nation	Time	Notes
1	Guy Butler	Great Britain	22.8	Q
2	Jérôme Mannaert	France	Unknown	Q
3	Juan Bautista Pina	Argentina	Unknown	

==== Heat 12 ====
Rank	Athlete	Nation	Time	Notes
1	Hermann Geißler	Austria	22.4	Q
2	Giuseppe Castelli	Italy	Unknown	Q
3	Aubrey Burton-Durham	South Africa	Unknown	
4	Angelos Lambrou	Greece	Unknown	

==== Heat 13 ====
Rank	Athlete	Nation	Time	Notes
1	Walter Rangeley	Great Britain	22.0	Q
2	Harry Broos	Netherlands	Unknown	Q
3	Willy Dujarin	Belgium	Unknown	
4	José de Lima	Portugal	Unknown	

==== Heat 14 ====
Rank	Athlete	Nation	Time	Notes
1	Percy Williams	Canada	22.6	Q
2	Jack Hambidge	Great Britain	Unknown	Q
3	Jaroslav Vykoupil	Czechoslovakia	Unknown	

==== Heat 15 ====
Rank	Athlete	Nation	Time	Notes
1	Cyril Gill	Great Britain	22.2	Q
2	Howard Kinsman	South Africa	Unknown	Q
3	Edgardo Toetti	Italy	Unknown	

=== Quarterfinals ===
Six heats were held; the fastest two finishers in each heat advanced to the semi-finals.

==== Quarterfinal 1 ====
Rank	Athlete	Nation	Time	Notes
1	Jakob Schüller	Germany	22.0	Q
2	Henry Cumming	{{dab=athlete|USA|1928 Summer}}	Unknown	Q
3	Ralph Adams	Canada	Unknown	
4	Hermann Geißler	Austria	Unknown	
5	Jack Hambidge	Great Britain	Unknown	

==== Quarterfinal 2 ====
Rank	Athlete	Nation	Time	Notes
1	Wilfred Legg	South Africa	21.8	Q
2	Cyril Gill	Great Britain	Unknown	Q
3	Hermann Schlöske	Germany	Unknown	
4	Rinus van den Berge	Netherlands	Unknown	
5	André Mourlon	France	Unknown	

==== Quarterfinal 3 ====
Rank	Athlete	Nation	Time	Notes
1	Charlie Paddock	United States	21.8	Q
2	Björn Kugelberg	Sweden	Unknown	Q
3	André Cerbonney	France	Unknown	
4	Guy Butler	Great Britain	Unknown	
5	Harry Broos	Netherlands	Unknown	

==== Quarterfinal 4 ====
Rank	Athlete	Nation	Time	Notes
1	Jackson Scholz	United States	21.8	Q
2	Walter Rangeley	Great Britain	21.9	Q
3	Paul Brochart	Belgium	Unknown	
4	Maurice Degrelle	France	Unknown	
5	Karel Knenicky	Czechoslovakia	Unknown	

==== Quarterfinal 5 ====
Rank	Athlete	Nation	Time	Notes
1	John Fitzpatrick	Canada	22.0	Q
2	Mario Gómez	Mexico	Unknown	Q
3	Alberto Barucco	Argentina	Unknown	
4	Jérôme Mannaert	France	Unknown	
5	Howard Kinsman	South Africa	Unknown	

==== Quarterfinal 6 ====
Rank	Athlete	Nation	Time	Notes
1	Helmut Körnig	Germany	21.6	Q, =OR
2	Percy Williams	Canada	21.8	Q
3	Charley Borah	United States	21.8	
4	Jimmy Carlton	Australia	22.0	
5	Giuseppe Castelli	Italy	22.2	

=== Semifinals ===
The fastest three runners from each of the two heats advanced to the Final Round.

==== Semifinal 1 ====
Rank	Athlete	Nation	Time	Notes
1	Percy Williams	Canada	22.0	Q
2	Walter Rangeley	Great Britain	22.0	Q
3	Jakob Schüller	Germany	22.1	Q
4	Charley Paddock	United States	22.1	
5	Mario Gómez	Mexico	22.3	
—	Wilfred Legg	South Africa	DNF	

==== Semifinal 2 ====
Rank	Athlete	Nation	Time	Notes
1	Helmut Körnig	Germany	21.8	Q
2	Jackson Scholz	United States	21.9	Q
3	John Fitzpatrick	Canada	22.0	Q
4	Henry Cumming	United States	22.1	
5	Cyril Gill	Great Britain	22.3	
6	Björn Kugelberg	Sweden	22.6	

=== Final ===
Helmut Körnig and Jackson Scholz finished so close that the judges could not determine who was third and who fourth.

The judges called it a dead heat and called for a run-off. Scholz declined to participate, resulting in Körnig being awarded the bronze medal: the film of the race confirmed that Körnig finished third.

Rank	Athlete	Nation	Time
1st place, gold medalist(s)	Percy Williams	Canada	21.8
2nd place, silver medalist(s)	Walter Rangeley	Great Britain	21.9
3rd place, bronze medalist(s)	Helmut Körnig	Germany	21.9
4	Jackson Scholz	United States	21.9
5	John Fitzpatrick	Canada	22.1
6	Jakob Schüller	Germany	22.2
