= Athletics at the 1928 Summer Olympics – Men's 100 metres =

Men's 100 metres at the Games of the IX Olympiad
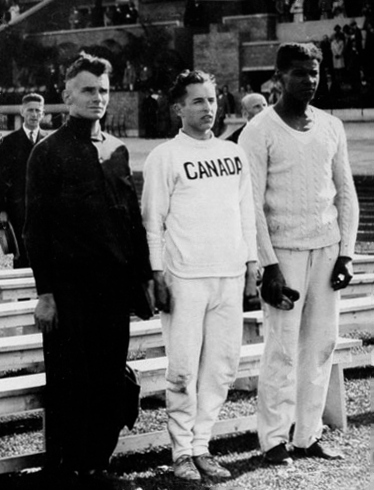
- Georg Lammers, Percy Williams and Jack London
- Venue: Olympic Stadium; Amsterdam, Netherlands
- Dates: 29 July 1928 (heats, quarterfinals); 30 July 1928 (semifinals, final)
- Competitors: 76 from 32 nations
- Winning time: 10.8 seconds

Medalists
1st place, gold medalist(s)		Percy Williams	Canada
2nd place, silver medalist(s)		Jack London	Great Britain
3rd place, bronze medalist(s)		Georg Lammers	Germany

The men's 100 metres sprint event at the 1928 Summer Olympics in Amsterdam, Netherlands, were held at the Olympic Stadium on Sunday, 29 July and Monday, 30 July. Eighty-one runners entered, though ultimately seventy-six runners from 32 nations competed. NOCs were limited to 4 competitors each. The event was won by Percy Williams of Canada, taking the nation's first men's 100 metres gold medal. Jack London of Great Britain took silver, marking the third consecutive Games that Great Britain had a medalist in the event. Georg Lammers won bronze, Germany's first medal in the event since 1896. For the first time in modern Olympic history, the United States won no medals in the event.

== Background ==
This was the eighth time the event was held, having appeared at every Olympics since the first in 1896. None of the 1924 finalists competed (bronze medalist Arthur Porritt entered, but did not start). Notable entrants included Frank Wykoff, winner of the U.S. Olympic trials and one of the favourites in a field that was considered to be wide-open; Great Britain's Jack London, and Germany's Georg Lammers.

Cuba, Lithuania, and Romania were represented in the event for the first time. The United States was the only nation to have appeared at each of the first eight Olympic men's 100 metres events.

== Competition format ==
The event retained the four round format from 1920 and 1924: heats, quarterfinals, semifinals, and a final. There were 16 heats, of 3–6 athletes each, with the top 2 in each heat advancing to the quarterfinals. The 32 quarterfinalists were placed into 6 heats of 5 or 6 athletes. Again, the top 2 advanced. There were 2 heats of 6 semifinalists, this time with the top 3 advancing to the 6-man final.

== Records ==
These are the standing world and Olympic records (in seconds) prior to the 1928 Summer Olympics.

World record	10.4	(United States) Charlie Paddock	Redlands, California (USA)	April 23, 1921
Olympic Record	10.6	(United States) Donald Lippincott	Stockholm (SWE)	July 6, 1912
Olympic Record	10.6	(United Kingdom) Harold Abrahams	Paris (FRA)	July 6/7 1924

Percy Williams equalized the standing Olympic record with 10.6 seconds in the fourth heat of the second round. In the first semifinal, Williams, Robert McAllister, and Wilfred Legg all equalized the record.

== Results ==
=== First round ===
Sixteen heats were held, the two fastest of each qualified for the second round.

==== Heat 1 ====
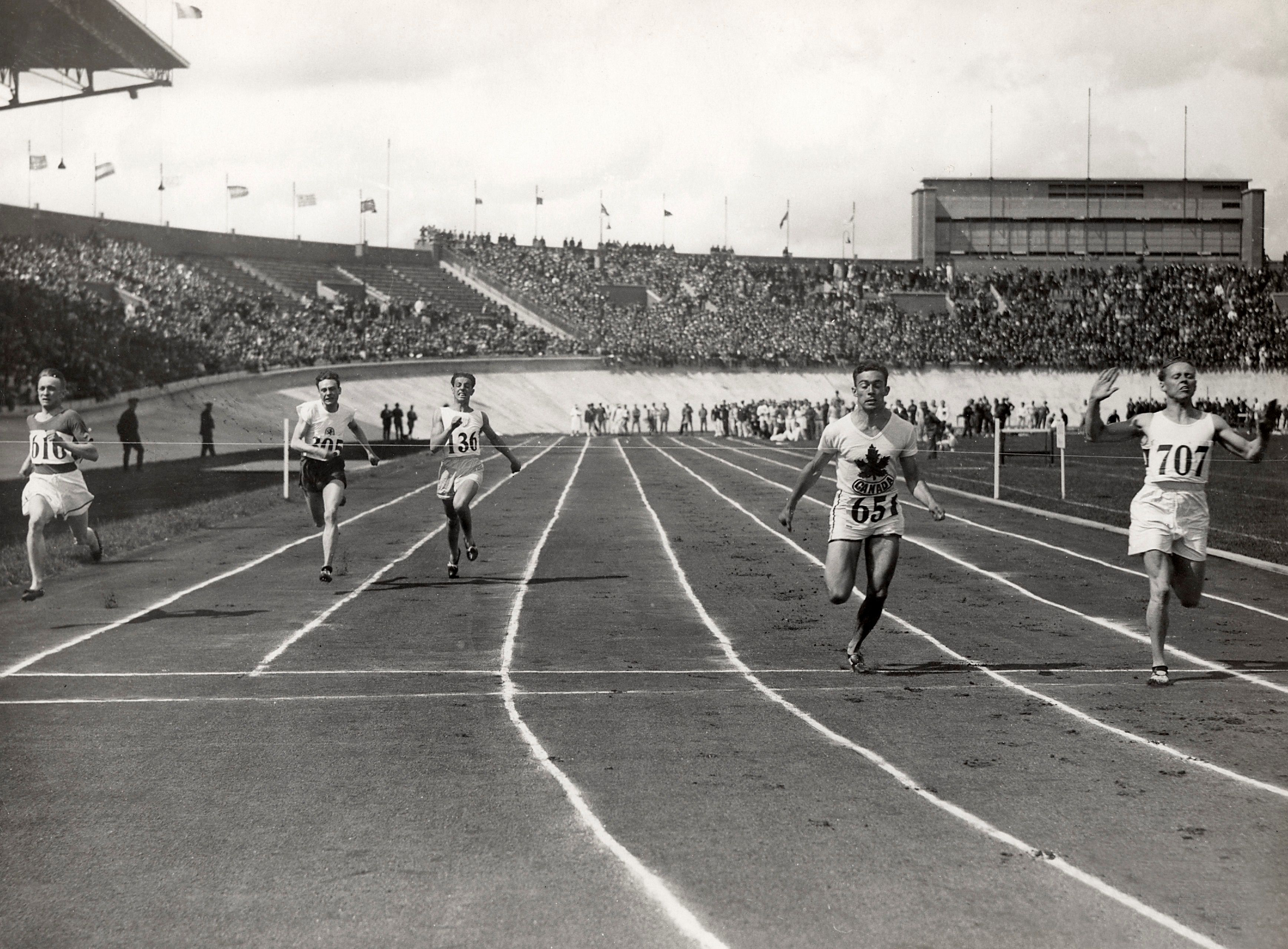
Heat 1: Willy Dujardin, Wilhelm Hennings, Angelos Lamprou, John Fitzpatrick, Richard Corts

Rank	Athlete	Nation	Time	Notes
1	John Fitzpatrick	Canada	11.0	Q
2	Richard Corts	Germany	11.0	Q
3	Willy Dujardin	Belgium	11.2	
4	Wilhelm Hennings	Netherlands	11.4	
5	Angelos Lambrou	Greece	11.4	

==== Heat 2 ====
Rank	Athlete	Nation	Time	Notes
1	Sydney Atkinson	South Africa	11.2	Q
2	André Mourlon	France	11.3	Q
3	Jesús Moraila	Mexico	Unknown	
4	Franco Reyser	Italy	Unknown	
—	Friedrich-Wilhelm Wichmann	Germany	DNS	

==== Heat 3 ====
Rank	Athlete	Nation	Time	Notes
1	Frank Wykoff	United States	11.0	Q
2	Paul Brochart	Belgium	Unknown	Q
3	Jaap Boot	Netherlands	Unknown(*)	
4	Mario Gómez Daza	Mexico	Unknown	
5	Konstantinos Petridis	Greece	Unknown	
6	Fernando Muñagorri	Spain	Unknown	

(*) Some sources credit the third place to Gómez Daza and list Boot in fourth. (The official report did not show the ranking.)

==== Heat 4 ====
Rank	Athlete	Nation	Time	Notes
1	Ferenc Gerő	Hungary	10.8	Q
2	Aubrey Burton-Durham	South Africa	Unknown	Q
3	Willy Weibel	Switzerland	11.4	
4	Diego Ordóñez	Spain	11.4	
5	John Heap	Great Britain	Unknown	
6	Eduardo Albe	Argentina	Unknown	

==== Heat 5 ====
Rank	Athlete	Nation	Time	Notes
1	Jack London	Great Britain	10.8	Q
2	George Hester	Canada	Unknown	Q
3	Ladislau Peter	Romania	Unknown	
4	Francisco Costas	Mexico	Unknown	
5	Mehmet Ali Aybar	Turkey	Unknown	

==== Heat 6 ====
Rank	Athlete	Nation	Time	Notes
1	Juan Bautista Pina	Argentina	11.0	Q
2	Ralph Adams	Canada	Unknown	Q
3	Edgardo Toetti	Italy	Unknown	
4	Iwao Aizawa	Japan	Unknown	
5	Semih Türkdoğan	Turkey	Unknown	

==== Heat 7 ====
Rank	Athlete	Nation	Time	Notes
1	Wilfred Legg	South Africa	11.0	Q
2	Cyril Gill	Great Britain	11.0	Q
3	Rodolfo Wagner	Chile	Unknown	
—	Sándor Hajdú	Hungary	DNS	
—	Giuseppe Castelli	Italy	DNS	

==== Heat 8 ====
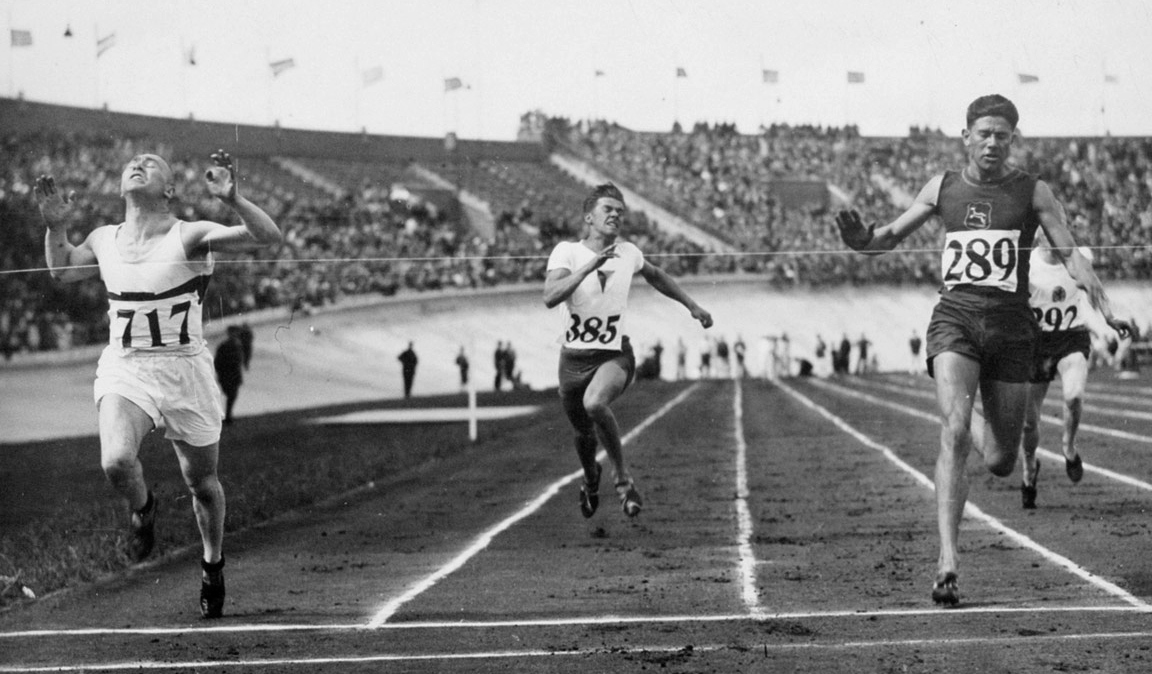
Heat 8: Hubert Houben, Karel Kněnický, Johannes Viljoen

Rank	Athlete	Nation	Time	Notes
1	Hubert Houben	Germany	11.0	Q
2	Johannes Viljoen	South Africa	11.0	Q
3	Karel Kněnický	Czechoslovakia	11.3	
4	Dolf Benz	Netherlands	11.4	

==== Heat 9 ====
Rank	Athlete	Nation	Time	Notes
1	Georg Lammers	Germany	10.8	Q
2	André Théard	Haiti	Unknown	Q
3	János Paizs	Hungary	Unknown	
4	Leo Jørgensen	Denmark	Unknown	
5	Jean Moulin	Luxembourg	Unknown	
6	Renos Frangoudis	Greece	Unknown	

==== Heat 10 ====
Rank	Athlete	Nation	Time	Notes
1	Walter Rangeley	Great Britain	11.0	Q
2	Rinus van den Berge	Netherlands	11.1	Q
3	Johann Bartl	Czechoslovakia	Unknown	
4	Şinasi Şahingiray	Turkey	Unknown	

==== Heat 11 ====
Rank	Athlete	Nation	Time	Notes
1	István Raggambi	Hungary	11.0	Q
2	Jimmy Carlton	Australia	11.1	Q
3	Alberto Barucco	Argentina	Unknown	
4	Óscar Alvarado	Chile	Unknown	
5	Juan Serrahima	Spain	Unknown	
6	Ronald Burns	India	Unknown	

==== Heat 12 ====
Rank	Athlete	Nation	Time	Notes
1	Percy Williams	Canada	11.0	Q
2	Jaroslav Vykoupil	Czechoslovakia	Unknown	Q
3	André Dufau	France	Unknown	
4	José de Lima	Portugal	Unknown	
5	Haris Šveminas	Lithuania	Unknown	

==== Heat 13 ====
Rank	Athlete	Nation	Time	Notes
1	José Barrientos	Cuba	11.0	Q
2	André Cerbonney	France	Unknown	Q
3	Fred Zinner	Belgium	Unknown	
-	Arthur Porritt	New Zealand	DNS	

==== Heat 14 ====
Rank	Athlete	Nation	Time	Notes
1	Claude Bracey	United States	11.0	Q
2	Gilbert Auvergne	France	11.1	Q
3	Hermann Geißler	Austria	11.2	
4	Risto Mattila	Finland	11.3	
5	Emmanuel Goldsmith	Switzerland	11.5	
6	George Schmit	Luxembourg	12.2	

==== Heat 15 ====
Rank	Athlete	Nation	Time	Notes
1	Henry Russell	United States	11.0	Q
2	Denis Cussen	Ireland	Unknown	Q
3	Willy Tschopp	Switzerland	Unknown	
4	Adolphe Groscol	Belgium	Unknown	

==== Heat 16 ====
Rank	Athlete	Nation	Time	Notes
1	Bob McAllister	United States	10.8	Q
2	Anselmo Gonzaga	Philippines	Unknown	Q
3	Enrique de Chávarri	Spain	Unknown	
4	Frédéric Eyschen	Luxembourg	Unknown	
5	H. Enis	Turkey	DNS	

=== Quarterfinals ===
Six heats were held, the two fastest of each qualified for the semifinals.

==== Quarterfinal 1 ====
Rank	Athlete	Nation	Time	Notes
1	Wilfred Legg	South Africa	10.8	Q
2	John Fitzpatrick	Canada	Unknown	Q
3	Ferenc Gerő	Hungary	Unknown	
4	Rinus van den Berge	Netherlands	Unknown	
5	Denis Cussen	Ireland	Unknown	
6	Jaroslav Vykoupil	Czechoslovakia	Unknown	

==== Quarterfinal 2 ====
Rank	Athlete	Nation	Time	Notes
1	Robert McAllister	United States	10.8	Q
2	Richard Corts	Germany	11.0	Q
3	Cyril Gill	Great Britain	Unknown	
4	István Raggambi	Hungary	Unknown	
5	Aubrey Burton-Durham	South Africa	Unknown	
6	André Cerbonney	France	Unknown	

==== Quarterfinal 3 ====
Rank	Athlete	Nation	Time	Notes
1	Henry Russell	United States	10.8	Q
2	Hubert Houben	Germany	Unknown	Q
3	Gilbert Auvergne	France	Unknown	
4	George Hester	Canada	Unknown	
5	Sydney Atkinson	South Africa	Unknown	

==== Quarterfinal 4 ====
Rank	Athlete	Nation	Time	Notes
1	Percy Williams	Canada	10.6	Q, =OR
2	Jack London	Great Britain	10.8	Q
3	André Théard	Haiti	Unknown	
4	André Mourlon	France	Unknown	
5	José Barrientos	Cuba	Unknown	

==== Quarterfinal 5 ====
Rank	Athlete	Nation	Time	Notes
1	Frank Wykoff	United States	10.8	Q
2	Juan Bautista Pina	Argentina	Unknown	Q
3	Johannes Viljoen	South Africa	Unknown	
4	Anselmo Gonzaga	Philippines	Unknown	
5	Jimmy Carlton	Australia	11.0	

==== Quarterfinal 6 ====
Rank	Athlete	Nation	Time	Notes
1	Claude Bracey	United States	10.8	Q
2	Georg Lammers	Germany	Unknown	Q
3	Walter Rangeley	Great Britain	Unknown	
4	Ralph Adams	Canada	Unknown	
5	Paul Brochart	Belgium	Unknown	

=== Semifinals ===
Two semifinals were held, the three fastest of each qualified for the final.

==== Semifinal 1 ====
Rank	Athlete	Nation	Time	Notes
1	Robert McAllister	United States	10.6	Q, =OR
2	Percy Williams	Canada	10.6	Q, =OR
3	Wilfred Legg	South Africa	10.6	Q. =OR
4	Hubert Houben	Germany	10.7	
5	Claude Bracey	United States	10.8	
6	Juan Bautista Pina	Argentina	11.0	

==== Semifinal 2 ====
Rank	Athlete	Nation	Time	Notes
1	Jack London	Great Britain	10.6	Q, =OR
2	Georg Lammers	Germany	10.7	Q
3	Frank Wykoff	United States	10.7	Q
4	Henry Russell	United States	10.8	
5	Richard Corts	Germany	10.8	
6	John Fitzpatrick	Canada	10.9	

=== Final ===
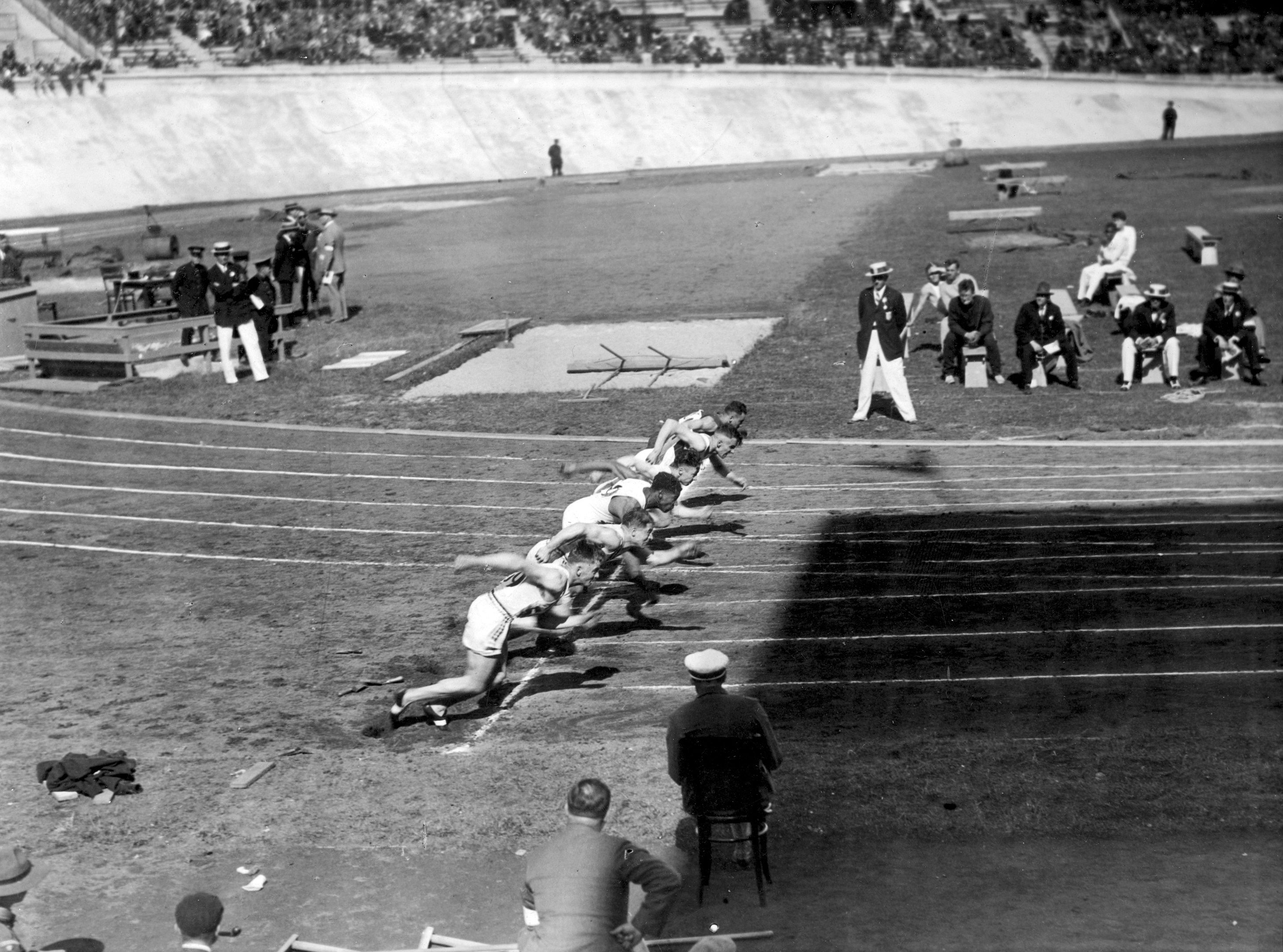
Final 100 m

There were two false starts, by Legg and Wykoff. Once the final successfully started, Williams took the early lead and never relinquished it.

Rank	Athlete	Nation	Time
1st place, gold medalist(s)	Percy Williams	Canada	10.8
2nd place, silver medalist(s)	Jack London	Great Britain	10.9
3rd place, bronze medalist(s)	Georg Lammers	Germany	10.9
4	Frank Wykoff	United States	11.0
5	Wilfred Legg	South Africa	11.0
6	Robert McAllister	United States	11.0
