= Muñagorri =

Muñagorri is a Spanish surname. Notable people with the surname include:

- Fernando Muñagorri (1907–1959), Spanish sprinter
- José Antonio Muñagorri (1794–1841), Spanish politician and military man
- José María Muñagorri (1902–1968), Spanish footballer
- Pedro Muñagorri (born 1965), Spanish chef and sommelier
