= José Barrientos =

Cuban sprinter (1904–1945)

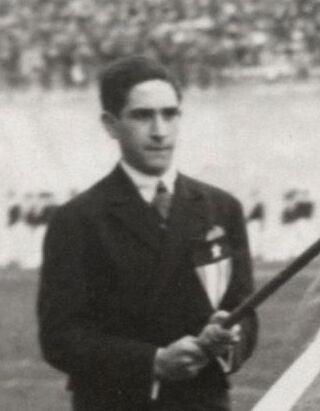
- Barrientos in 1928

Personal information
- Nationality: Cuban
- Born: José Eduardo Barrientos Schweyer; 18 March 1904 Matanzas, Cuba
- Died: 27 September 1945 (aged 41) Straits of Florida

Sport
- Sport: Sprinting
- Event: 100 metres

José Eduardo Barrientos Schweyer (18 March 1904 – 27 September 1945) was a Cuban sprinter. As a sprinter, he equaled the world record for the men's 100 metres in 1927. For the 1928 Summer Olympics, he competed for the Cuban team in the same event. After his death in 1945 from an aviation accident, the Barrientos Memorial athletics meeting was inaugurated in honor of him.

== Biography ==
José Eduardo Barrientos Schweyer was born on 18 March 1904 in Matanzas, Cuba. His brother, Armando Barrientos, was a former sprinter and fencer who competed at the 1948 Summer Olympics.

Competing in the men's 100 metres, Barrientos ran the distance at a competition held in March 1927 in a personal best-setting time of 10.4 seconds. This equaled the world record at the time and made him rank first in the world rankings. The following month, he recorded a time of 9.9 seconds in a 100-yard race held in Gainesville, Florida, United States, setting a record for the fastest completion of that race in the state.

For the 1928 Summer Olympics held in Amsterdam, Barrientos was selected to compete for the Cuban team. He competed in the heats of the men's 100 metres on 29 July in the thirteenth preliminary heat against two other athletes. He recorded a time of 11 seconds, placing first in the heat, and qualified for the quarterfinals. The quarterfinals were held on the same day, where he competed in the fourth round. He finished with an estimated time of 11 seconds and was recorded as fifth, though footage had shown him beating another competitor. Nevertheless, he did not qualify for the semifinals. He was also entered in the men's 200 metres but did not start in the event.

On 27 September 1945, Barrientos was involved in an aviation accident along the Straits of Florida and died at the age of 41. The Barrientos Memorial athletics meeting was inaugurated the following year in honor of him, with the competition often serving as the Cuban Athletics Championships.
