= Sidlo =

Sidlo, Sidło (Polish), Šídlo/Šidlo (Czech/Slovak feminine: Šídlova/Šidlova) are West Slavic surnames. Notable people with these surnames include:

- Janusz Sidło (1933–1993), Polish javelin thrower
- Josef Šídlo, Czech cyclist
