= Henry Cumming =

Henry Cumming may refer to:

- Henry Harford Cumming (1799–1866), American businessman
- Henry Cumming (athlete) (1905–1945), American sprinter
- Henry John Cumming (1771–1856), British Army general

== See also ==
- Henry J. B. Cummings (1831–1909), lawyer, Civil War officer, editor and publisher
