= George Schmit =

Luxembourgish sprinter

Personal information
- Nationality: Luxembourgish
- Born: 17 August 1904
- Died: 27 September 1978 (aged 74)

Sport
- Sport: Sprinting
- Event: 100 metres

George Schmit (17 August 1904 – 27 September 1978) was a Luxembourgish sprinter. He competed in the men's 100 metres at the 1928 Summer Olympics.
