= Frédéric Eyschen =

Luxembourgish sprinter (1902–1960)

Personal information
- Nationality: Luxembourgish
- Born: 18 December 1902
- Died: 30 May 1960 (aged 57)

Sport
- Sport: Sprinting
- Event: 100 metres

Frédéric Eyschen (18 December 1902 – 30 May 1960) was a Luxembourgish sprinter. He competed in the men's 100 metres at the 1928 Summer Olympics. He also played football as a forward, and appeared three times for the Luxembourg national team.
