= Leo Jørgensen =

Danish sprinter

Personal information
- Nationality: Danish
- Born: 29 January 1903
- Died: 1 December 1968 (aged 65)

Sport
- Sport: Sprinting
- Event: 100 metres

Leo Jørgensen (29 January 1903 – 1 December 1968) was a Danish sprinter. He competed in the men's 100 metres at the 1928 Summer Olympics.
