= Jérôme Mannaert =

French sprinter

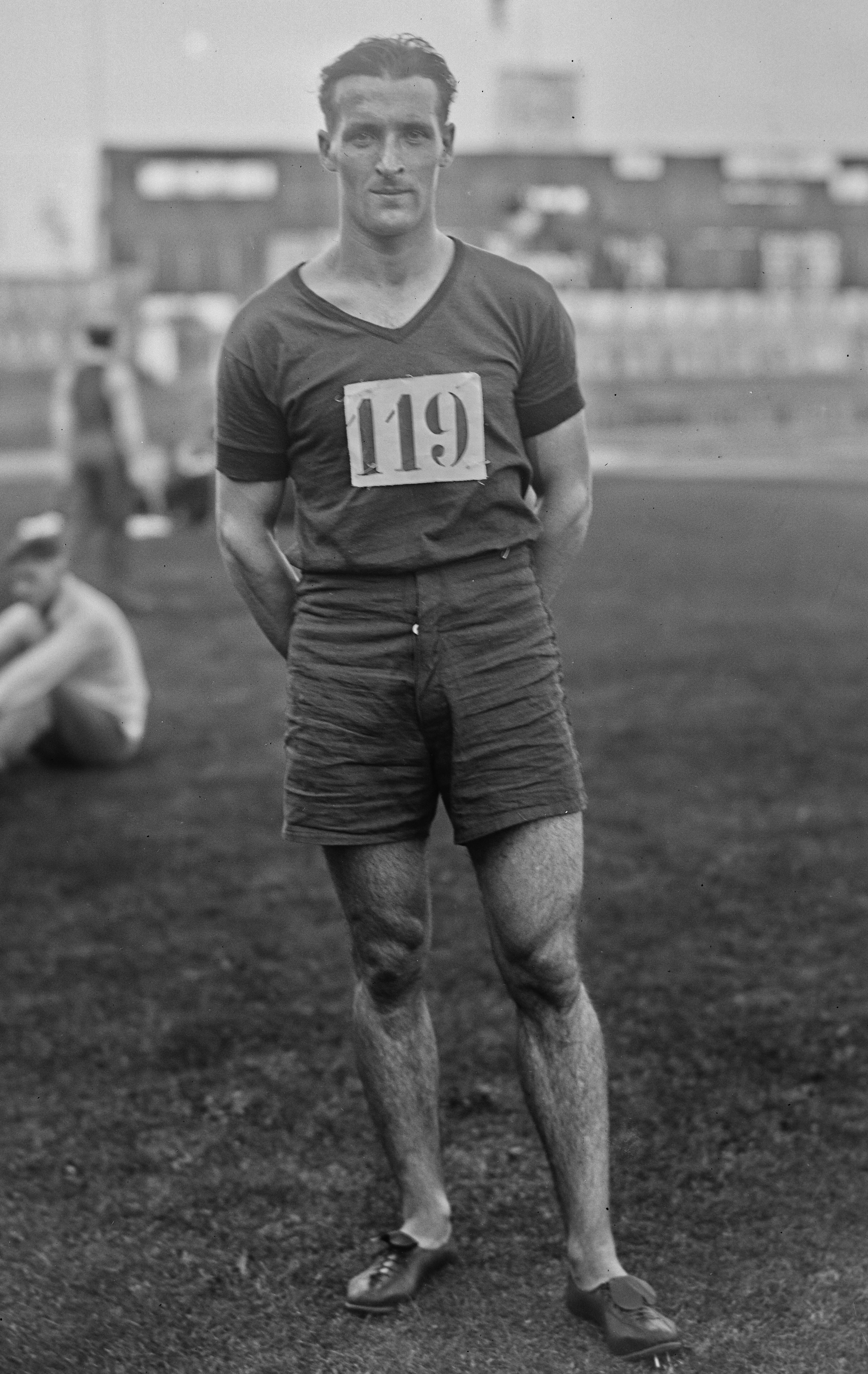

Personal information
- Nationality: French
- Born: 22 February 1902
- Died: 1967 (aged 64–65)

Sport
- Sport: Sprinting
- Event: 200 metres

Jérôme Mannaert (22 February 1902 – 1967) was a French sprinter. He competed in the men's 200 metres at the 1928 Summer Olympics.
