= Wilfred Legg =

South African sprinter

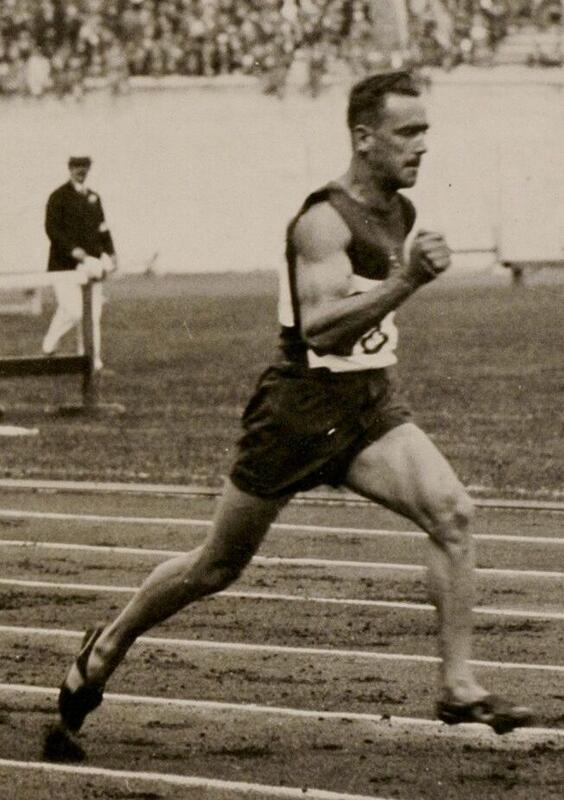

Personal information
- Nationality: South African
- Born: 3 November 1906 Robertson, Western Cape, South Africa
- Died: 15 October 1973 (aged 66) South Africa
- Height: 175 cm (5 ft 9 in)
- Weight: 68 kg (150 lb)

Sport
- Sport: Athletics
- Event: Sprinting
Medal record
Men's Athletics
Representing South Africa
British Empire Games
| Bronze medal – third place | 1930 Hamilton | 4×110 yards |
| Bronze medal – third place | 1930 Hamilton | 4×440 yards |

Wilfred Beauchamp Legg also known as Billie Legg (3 November 1906 – 15 October 1973) was a South African athlete who competed in the 1928 Summer Olympics.

== Biography ==
Legg was born in Robertson, Western Cape. He won the British AAA Championships title in the 100 yards event at the 1928 AAA Championships.

Shortly afterwards he represented South Africa at the 1928 Olympic Games in Amsterdam, Netherlands, where he finished fifth the Olympic 100 metres event. In the 200 metres competition he was eliminated in the semi-finals.

At the 1930 British Empire Games he was a member of the South African relay team which won the bronze medal in the 4×110 yards contest as well as in the 4×440 yards event. In the 100 yards competition he finished fourth and in the 220 yards contest he was eliminated in the heats.

== Competition record ==
| Year | Competition | Venue | Position | Event | Notes |
Representing South Africa
| 1930 | British Empire Games | Hamilton, Canada | 4th | 100 y | NT |
