= Josef Rabas =

Czech equestrian

Personal information
- Nationality: Czechoslovak
- Born: 17 July 1898; Čečovice, Austria-Hungary
- Died: 30 June 1965 (aged 66); Horšovský Týn, Czechoslovakia

Sport
- Sport: Equestrian

Josef Rabas (17 July 1898 – 30 June 1965) was a Czechoslovak equestrian. He competed at the 1924 Summer Olympics and the 1928 Summer Olympics.
