= István Raggambi =

Hungarian sprinter

Personal information
- Nationality: Hungarian
- Born: 8 February 1905
- Died: 9 December 1961 (aged 56)

Sport
- Sport: Sprinting
- Event: 100 metres

István Raggambi (8 February 1905 – 9 December 1961) was a Hungarian sprinter. He competed in the men's 100 metres at the 1928 Summer Olympics.
