= Björn Kugelberg =

Swedish sprinter (1905–1980)

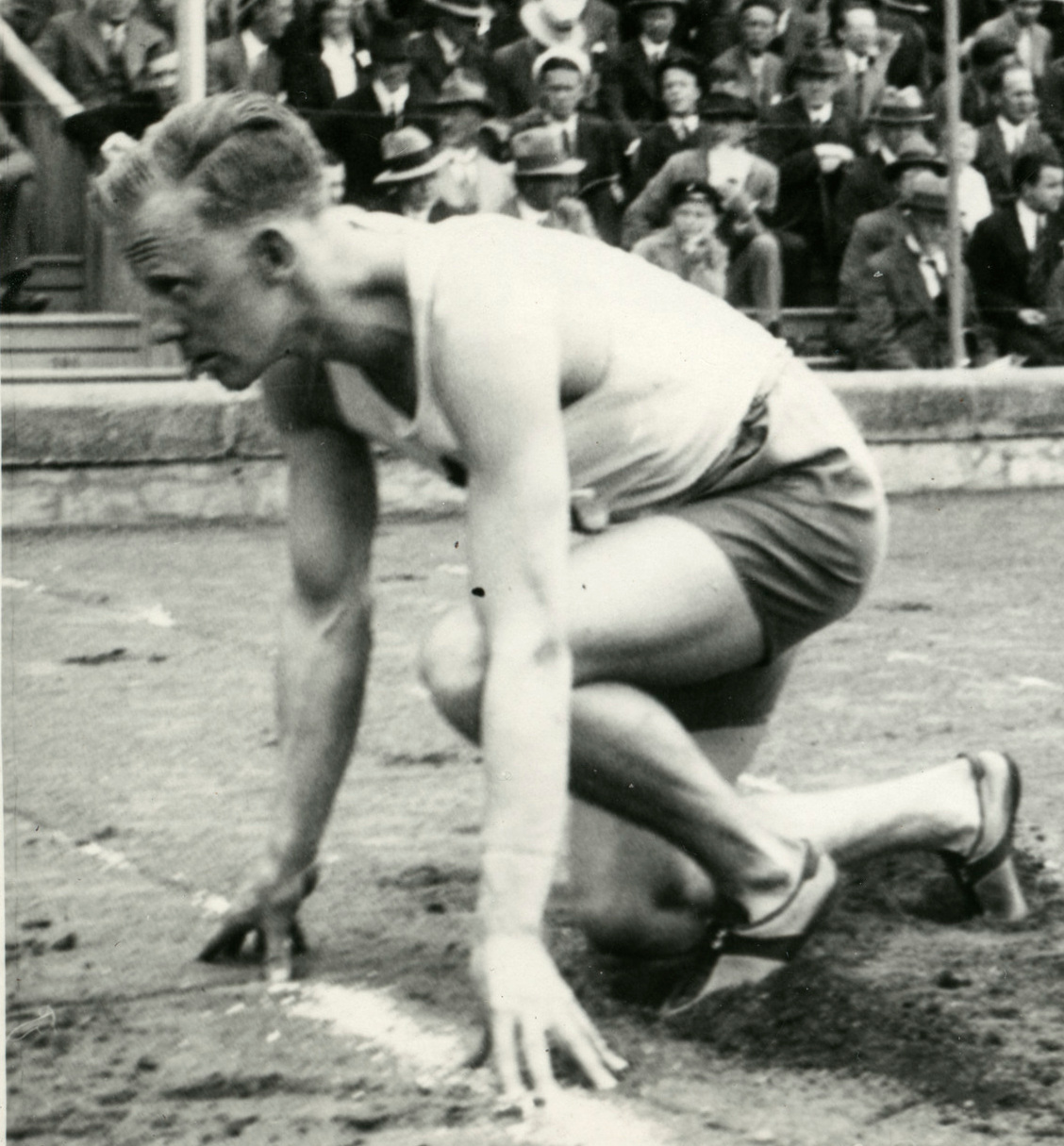
- Kugelberg in 1931

Personal information
- Nationality: Swedish
- Born: 9 February 1905 Karlskrona, Sweden
- Died: 27 October 1980 (aged 75) Helsingborg, Sweden

Sport
- Sport: Athletics
- Event: 100–400 m
- Club: IFK Malmö

Achievements and titles
- Personal bests: 100 m – 10.6 (1929); 200 m – 21.9 (1928); 400 m – 49.2 (1931)

Björn Fredrik Arvid Kugelberg (9 February 1905 – 27 October 1980) was a Swedish sprinter. He competed in the 200 m and 4 × 400 m events at the 1928 Summer Olympics and placed fourth in the relay.
