= Cuba at the 1928 Summer Olympics =

- IOC code: CUB
- NOC: Cuban Olympic Committee

in Amsterdam
- Competitors: 1 in 1 sport
- Flag bearer: José Barrientos
- Medals: Gold 0 Silver 0 Bronze 0 Total 0

Summer Olympics appearances (overview)
- 1900; 1904; 1908–1920; 1924; 1928; 1932–1936; 1948; 1952; 1956; 1960; 1964; 1968; 1972; 1976; 1980; 1984–1988; 1992; 1996; 2000; 2004; 2008; 2012; 2016; 2020; 2024

Cuba competed at the 1928 Summer Olympics in Amsterdam, Netherlands. The only competitor was Jose Eduardo Barrientos Schweyer (1904–1945) who was 24 years old when he competed in the Men's 100 metres. He reached the second round where he finished fifth in the fourth heat. He is known as "El Relampago del Caribe" (Caribbean's Thunder).

== Athletics ==
Key

- Note–Ranks given for track events are within the athlete's heat only
- Q = Qualified for the next round

Men
Track & road events

Athlete	Event	Heat		Quarterfinal		Semifinal		Final	
Athlete	Event	Result	Rank	Result	Rank	Result	Rank	Result	Rank
José Barrientos	100 m	11.0	1 Q	Unknown	5	did not advance			
