= Cerekvice nad Loučnou =

- Municipality
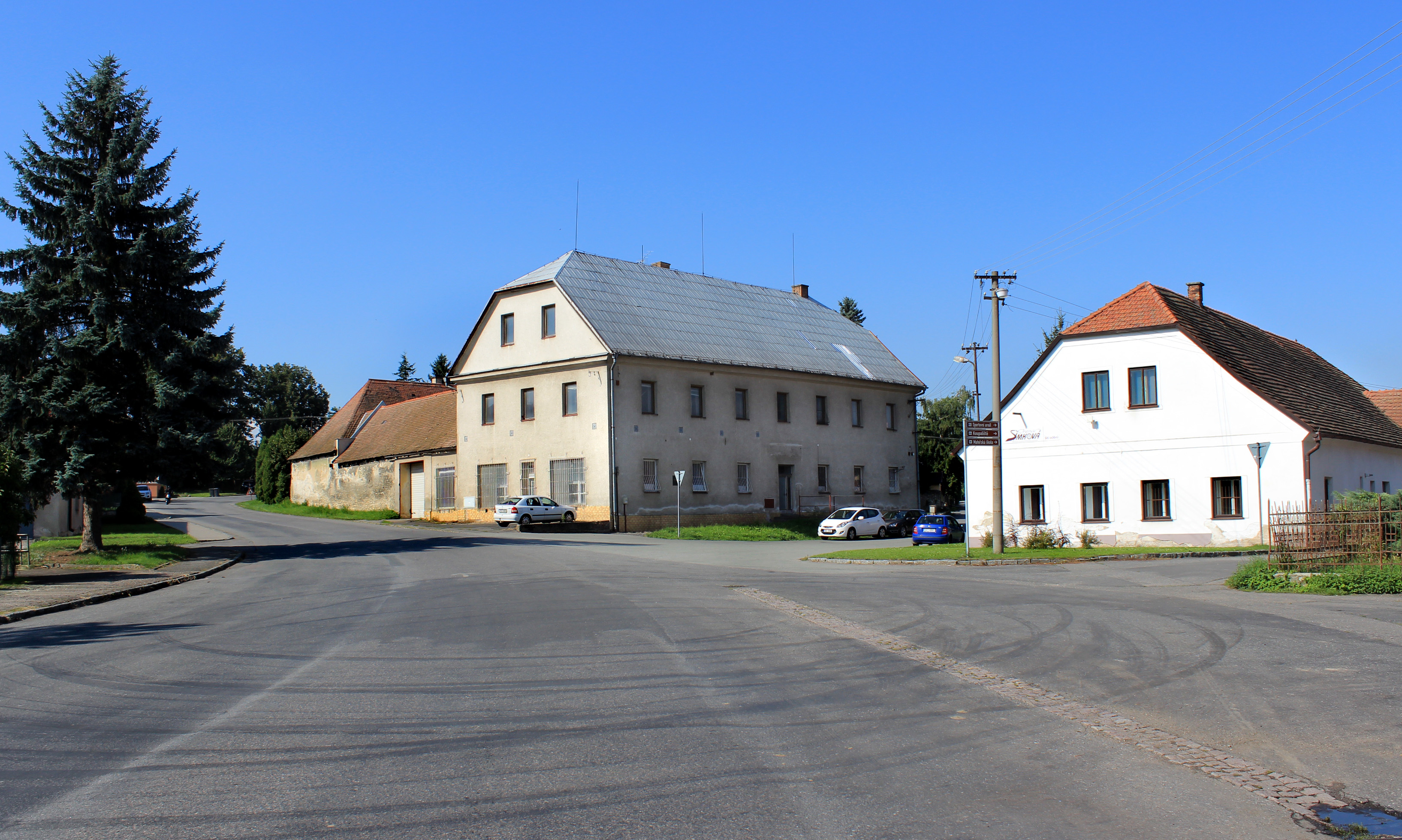
- Centre of Cerekvice nad Loučnou

- Flag Coat of arms

- Location in the Czech Republic
- Coordinates: 49°53′56″N 16°12′55″E
- Country: Czech Republic
- Region: Pardubice
- District: Svitavy
- First mentioned: 1167

Area
  - Total: 8.29 km^{2} (3.20 sq mi)
- Elevation: 294 m (965 ft)

Population (2026-01-01)
  - Total: 889
  - Density: 107/km^{2} (278/sq mi)
- Time zone: UTC+1 (CET)
  - Summer (DST): UTC+2 (CEST)
- Postal codes: 569 53, 570 01
- Website: www.cerekvice.eu

Cerekvice nad Loučnou is a municipality and village in Svitavy District in the Pardubice Region of the Czech Republic. It has about 900 inhabitants.

Cerekvice nad Loučnou lies approximately 25 kilometres (16 mi) north-west of Svitavy, 35 km (22 mi) south-east of Pardubice, and 131 km (81 mi) east of Prague.

== Administrative division ==
Cerekvice nad Loučnou consists of two municipal parts (in brackets population according to the 2021 census):

- Cerekvice nad Loučnou (678)
- Pekla (95)

== Demographics ==
Historical population
Year	Pop.	±%
1869	737	—
1880	894	+21.3%
1890	982	+9.8%
1900	1,033	+5.2%
1910	1,143	+10.6%
1921	1,137	−0.5%
1930	1,069	−6.0%
1950	829	−22.5%
1961	837	+1.0%
1970	817	−2.4%
1980	773	−5.4%
1991	826	+6.9%
2001	798	−3.4%
2011	819	+2.6%
2021	773	−5.6%
Source: Censuses
