= Dolf Benz =

Dutch sprinter

Personal information
- Nationality: Dutch
- Born: 15 September 1908 Amsterdam, Netherlands
- Died: 14 December 1988 (aged 80) The Hague, Netherlands

Sport
- Sport: Sprinting
- Event: 100 metres

Dolf Benz (15 September 1908 – 14 December 1988) was a Dutch sprinter. He competed in the men's 100 metres at the 1928 Summer Olympics.
