= Jiřice (Pelhřimov District) =

- Municipality
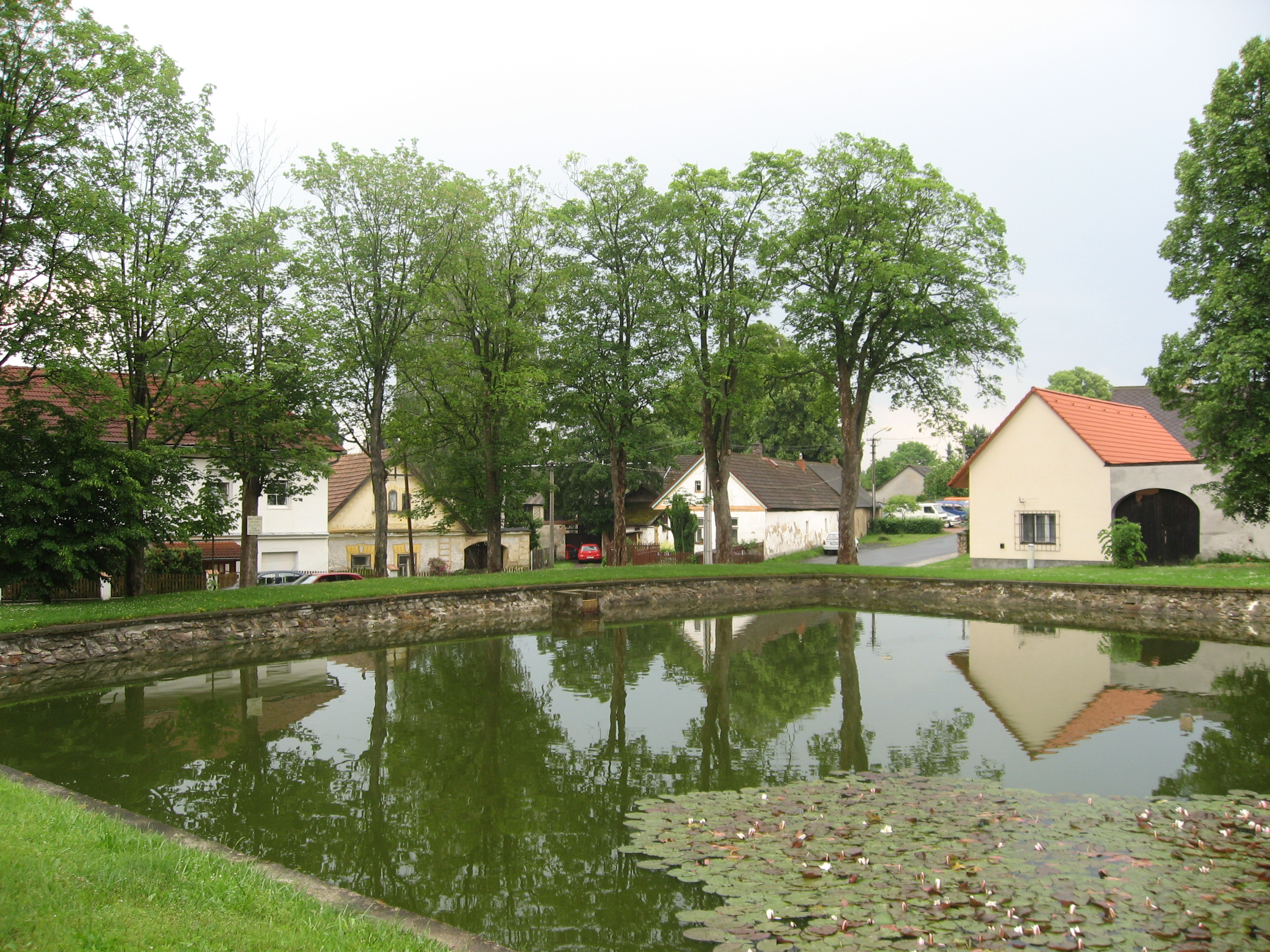
- Pond in the centre of Jiřice

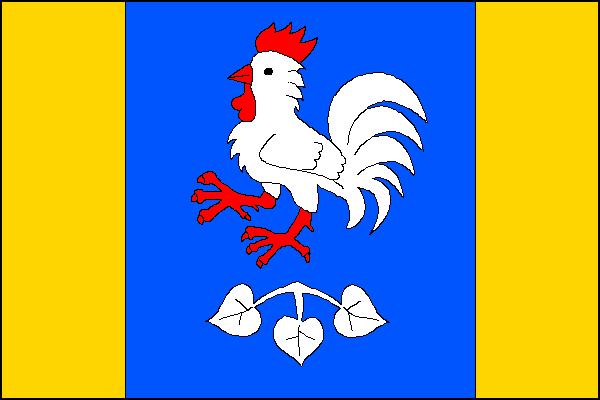
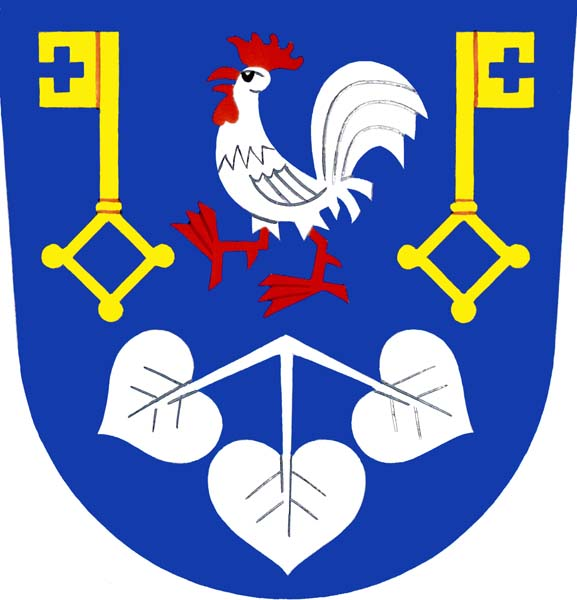
- Flag Coat of arms

- Location in the Czech Republic
- Coordinates: 49°33′12″N 15°19′6″E
- Country: Czech Republic
- Region: Vysočina
- District: Pelhřimov
- First mentioned: 1226

Area
  - Total: 13.57 km^{2} (5.24 sq mi)
- Elevation: 560 m (1,840 ft)

Population (2026-01-01)
  - Total: 948
  - Density: 69.9/km^{2} (181/sq mi)
- Time zone: UTC+1 (CET)
  - Summer (DST): UTC+2 (CEST)
- Postal code: 396 01
- Website: www.obec-jirice.cz

Jiřice is a municipality and village in Pelhřimov District in the Vysočina Region of the Czech Republic. It has about 900 inhabitants.

== Administrative division ==
Jiřice consists of three municipal parts (in brackets population according to the 2021 census):

- Jiřice (804)
- Močidla (17)
- Speřice (111)

== Etymology ==
The name Jiřice is derived from the personal name Jiří, meaning "the village of Jiří's people".

== Geography ==
Jiřice is located about 15 kilometres (9 mi) northeast of Pelhřimov and 25 km (16 mi) northwest of Jihlava. It lies in the Křemešník Highlands. The highest point is at 599 m (1,965 ft) above sea level. The municipal territory is rich in small fishponds.

== History ==
The first written mention of Jiřice is in a papal bull of Pope Honorius III from 1226, where the village is documented as a property of the monastery in Želiv. The village developed most rapidly in the second half of the 19th century, when the textile industry in the neighbouring town of Humpolec was developing and new workers were coming to the region.

== Demographics ==
Historical population

Year	Pop.	±%
1869	867	—
1880	955	+10.1%
1890	987	+3.4%
1900	994	+0.7%
1910	952	−4.2%

Year	Pop.	±%
1921	1,087	+14.2%
1930	937	−13.8%
1950	1,017	+8.5%
1961	781	−23.2%
1970	749	−4.1%

Year	Pop.	±%
1980	633	−15.5%
1991	608	−3.9%
2001	670	+10.2%
2011	862	+28.7%
2021	932	+8.1%

Source: Censuses

== Transport ==
The D1 motorway from Prague to Brno runs through the municipality.

== Sights ==
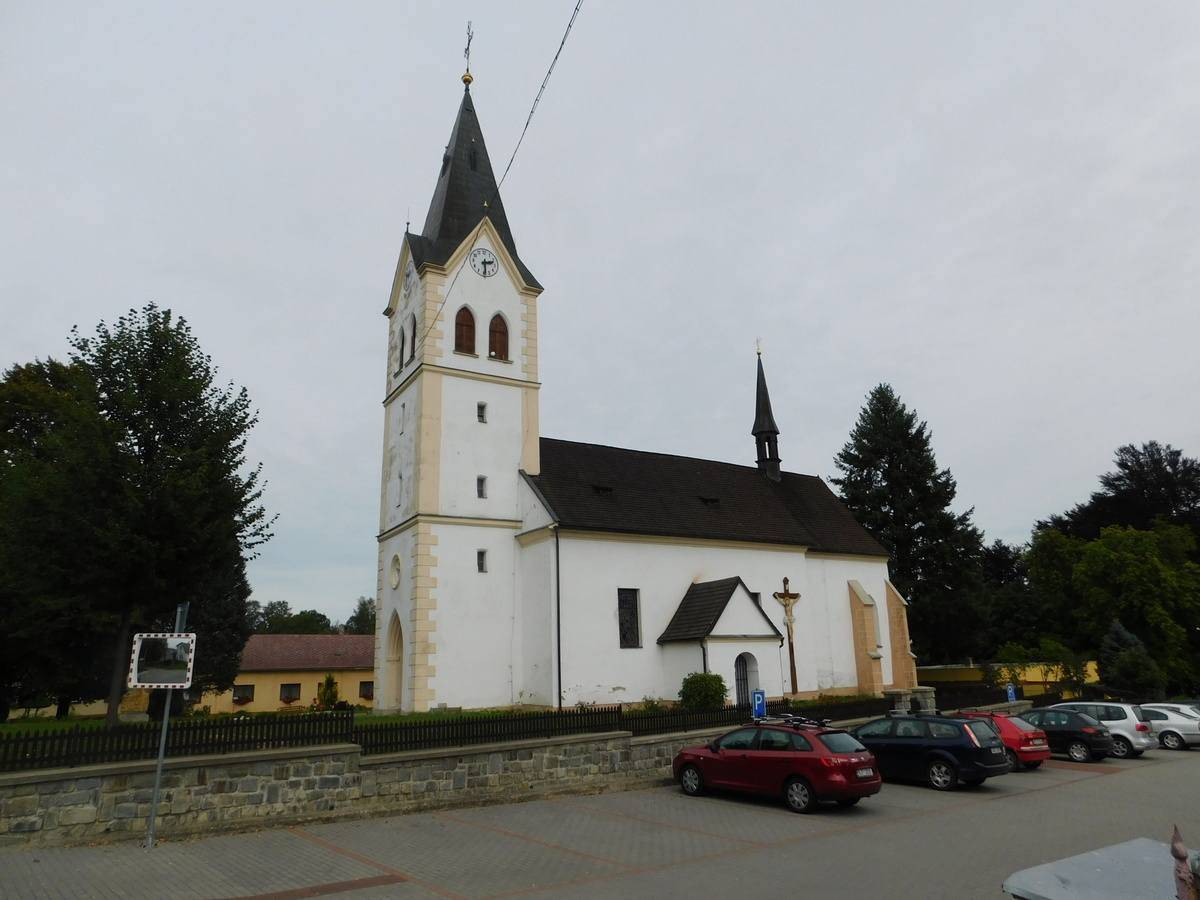
Church of Saint James the Great

The main landmark of Jiřice is the Church of Saint James the Great. It was originally a Gothic church, first mentioned in 1350. It was rebuilt and extended in 1650, 1772 and 1803. In 1905, the church was modified in the neo-Gothic style and the tower was added.

== Notable people ==
- Otto Schöniger (1889–1958), equestrian
