= Donald Cullen =

Irish sprinter

Personal information
- Nationality: Irish
- Born: 14 May 1908
- Died: 30 November 1976 (aged 68)

Sport
- Sport: Sprinting
- Event: 200 metres

Donald Cullen (14 May 1908 – 30 November 1976) was an Irish sprinter. He competed in the men's 200 metres at the 1928 Summer Olympics.
