= Gilbert Auvergne =

French sprinter (1905–1976)

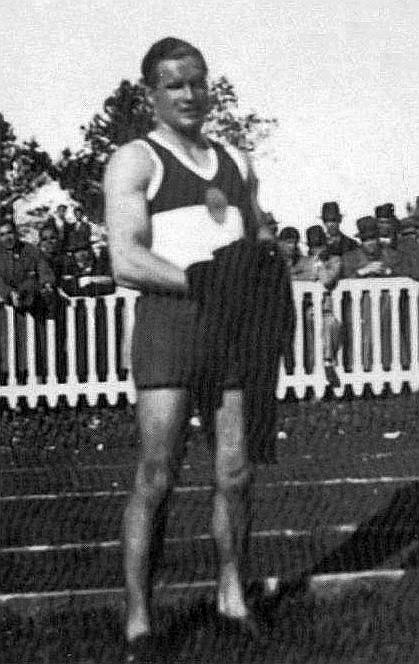
- Gilbert Auvergne in 1932.

Personal information
- Nationality: French
- Born: 17 December 1905 Nice, France
- Died: 24 September 1976 (aged 70) Antibes, France

Sport
- Sport: Sprinting
- Event: 100 metres

Gilbert Auvergne (17 December 1905 – 24 September 1976) was a French sprinter. He competed in the men's 100 metres at the 1928 Summer Olympics.
