= Risto Mattila (athlete) =

Finnish sprinter

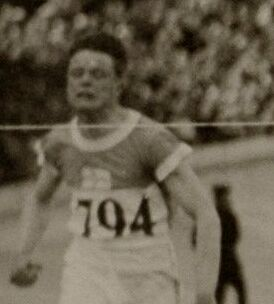
- Risto Mattila in 1928

Personal information
- Nationality: Finnish
- Born: 15 August 1909
- Died: 3 March 1990 (aged 80)

Sport
- Sport: Sprinting
- Event: 100 metres

Risto Mattila (15 August 1909 – 3 March 1990) was a Finnish sprinter. He competed in the men's 100 metres at the 1928 Summer Olympics.
