= Jack Hambidge =

British sprinter

Personal information
- Nationality: British
- Born: John Henry Hambidge; 22 June 1907
- Died: June 1994

Sport
- Sport: Sprinting
- Event: 200 metres

Jack Hambidge (22 June 1907 – June 1994) was a British sprinter. He competed in the men's 200 metres at the 1928 Summer Olympics.
