= Denis Cussen =

Irish sprinter

Personal information
- Born: 19 July 1901 Newcastle West, County Limerick, Ireland
- Died: 15 December 1980 (aged 79) Richmond, London, England
- Education: Blackrock College; Trinity College Dublin

Sport
- Sport: Athletics and rugby union
- Event: 100 metres

Rugby union career
- Position: Wing
International career
Years	Team	Apps	(Points)
1921–1927	Ireland	15	(15)
- Correct as of 17 January 2022

Denis Cussen (19 July 1901 – 15 December 1980) was an Irish sprinter, rugby union player and doctor. He competed in the men's 100 metres at the 1928 Summer Olympics.

== Early life and education ==
Born in Newcastle West, County Limerick in Ireland, Cussen was educated locally before attending Blackrock College in Dublin. He played rugby union while at Blackrock College and won several Leinster Schools Rugby Senior Cups with the school. He entered Trinity College Dublin in 1919 and, after studying medicine, qualified as a doctor in 1925.

== Rugby ==
Playing as a winger, Cussen made his debut for Ireland in 1921. He won fifteen caps for the country between 1921 and 1927, scoring five tries, including two in victory over England in 1926. After moving to London, he represented the Barbarians and St Mary's Hospital, London.

== Athletics ==
As a sprinter and jumper, Cussen won Irish titles in the 100 yards, 220 yards and long jump. His 1928 Irish record of 9.8 seconds for 100 yards equalled the world record on grass. He represented Ireland at the 1928 Amsterdam Olympics.

== Later life and death ==
Denis Cussen practised medicine in London and was later a medical adviser to Shell Oil. According to his biography in the Dictionary of Irish Biography, he was a "pioneer in the new speciality of physical medicine" and was one of the founders of the British Association of Sport and Medicine. Based in London in later life, Denis Cussen died at his home in Richmond on 15 December 1980.
