= Hermann Schlöske =

German sprinter

Personal information
- Nationality: German
- Born: 24 June 1905
- Died: 6 January 1991 (aged 85)

Sport
- Sport: Sprinting
- Event: 200 metres

Hermann Schlöske (24 June 1905 – 6 January 1991) was a German sprinter. He competed in the men's 200 metres at the 1928 Summer Olympics.
