= Bob McAllister (athlete) =

American sprinter

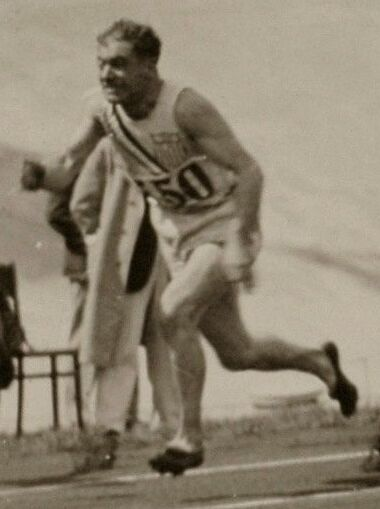
- Bob McAllister in 1928

Personal information
- Born: July 7, 1899 New York City, United States
- Died: October 22, 1962 (aged 63) Hollywood, Florida, United States

Sport
- Sport: Sprinting
- Event: 100 metres

Bob McAllister (July 7, 1899 – October 22, 1962) was an American sprinter. He competed in the men's 100 metres at the 1928 Summer Olympics. McAllister was known as The Flying Cop, after his profession as a New York City police officer.
