= Jaroslav Hanf =

Czech equestrian

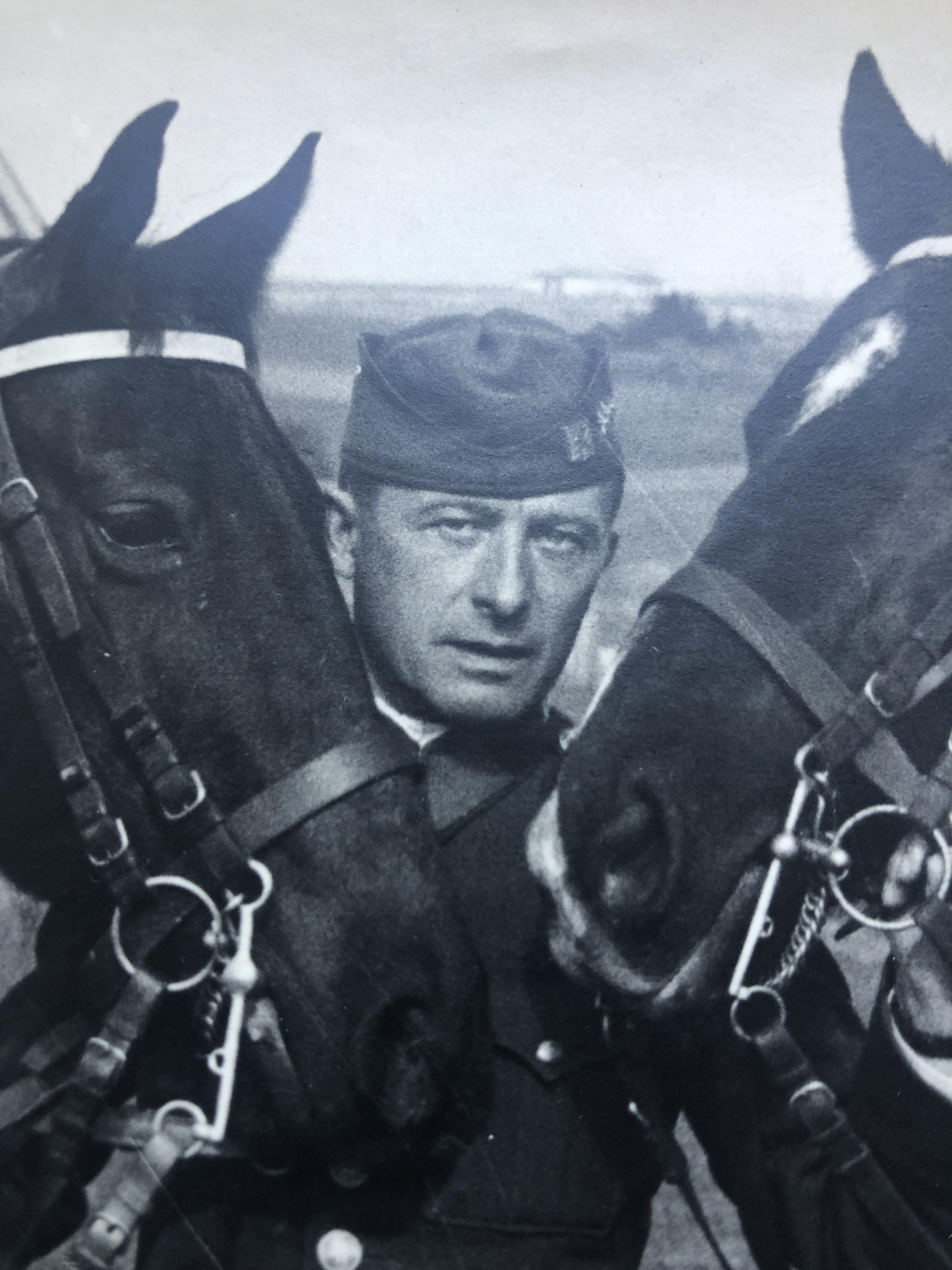

Personal information
- Nationality: Czechoslovak
- Born: 19 February 1888 Vacenovice, Austria-Hungary
- Died: 21 February 1958 (aged 70)

Sport
- Sport: Equestrian

Jaroslav Hanf (19 February 1888 – 21 February 1958) was a Czechoslovak equestrian. He competed at the 1924 Summer Olympics and the 1928 Summer Olympics.
