= Čečovice =

- Municipality
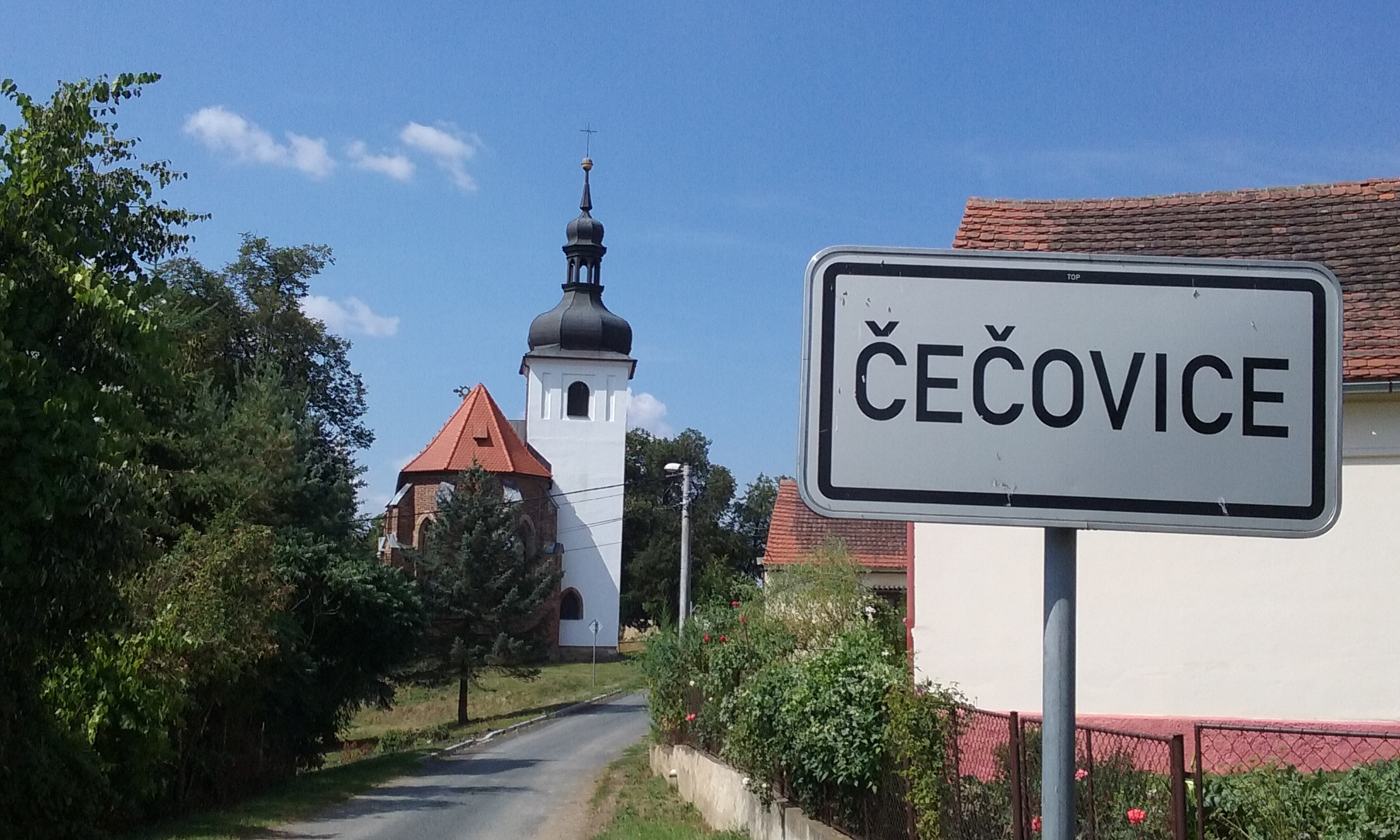
- Entrance to Čečovice

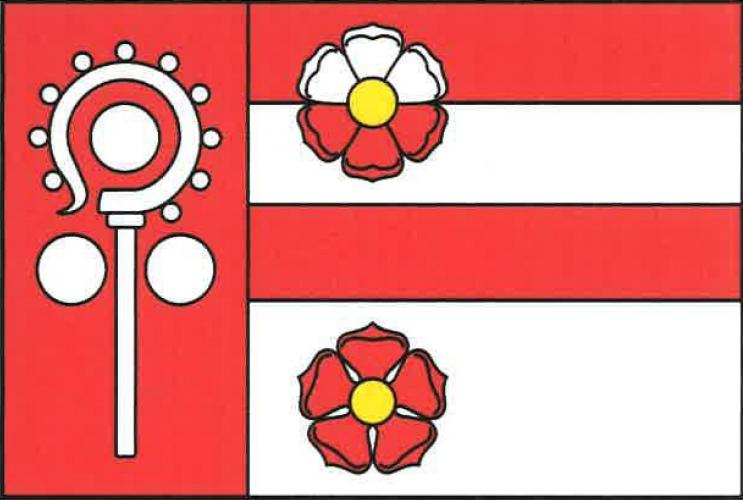
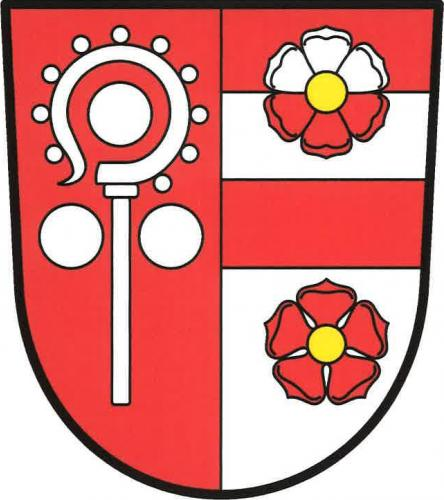
- Flag Coat of arms

- Location in the Czech Republic
- Coordinates: 49°35′7″N 13°1′18″E
- Country: Czech Republic
- Region: Plzeň
- District: Plzeň-South
- First mentioned: 1355

Area
  - Total: 4.55 km^{2} (1.76 sq mi)
- Elevation: 404 m (1,325 ft)

Population (2026-01-01)
  - Total: 101
  - Density: 22.2/km^{2} (57.5/sq mi)
- Time zone: UTC+1 (CET)
  - Summer (DST): UTC+2 (CEST)
- Postal code: 345 62
- Website: www.cecovice.cz

Čečovice is a municipality and village in Plzeň-South District in the Plzeň Region of the Czech Republic. It has about 100 inhabitants.

Čečovice lies approximately 27 km (17 mi) south-west of Plzeň, and 110 km (68 mi) south-west of Prague.

== History ==
The first written mention of Čečovice is from 1355.

From 1 January 2021, Čečovice is no longer a part of Domažlice District and belongs to Plzeň-South District.

== Demographics ==
Historical population
Year	Pop.	±%
1869	305	—
1880	328	+7.5%
1890	250	−23.8%
1900	304	+21.6%
1910	332	+9.2%
1921	362	+9.0%
1930	334	−7.7%
1950	135	−59.6%
1961	112	−17.0%
1970	119	+6.2%
1980	67	−43.7%
1991	79	+17.9%
2001	68	−13.9%
2011	88	+29.4%
2021	95	+8.0%
Source: Censuses
