= Jarmila Chalupová =

Czech fencer

Personal information
- Nationality: Czechoslovak
- Born: 26 March 1903 Vsetín, Austria-Hungary
- Died: 15 March 1988 (aged 84)

Sport
- Country: Czechoslovakia
- Sport: Fencing

Jarmila Chalupová (26 March 1903 – 15 March 1988) was a Czech Olympic fencer. She competed in the women's foil event at the 1928 Summer Olympics.

Chalupová married American Jerry Francis Vokral and emigrated to the United States in the 1930s. She represented a club in Philadelphia and became an American citizen in 1936.
