= Miroslav Beznoska =

Czech fencer

Sport
- Sport: Fencing

Miroslav Beznoska was a Czech fencer. He competed in the team épée event at the 1928 Summer Olympics.
