= Fernando Muñagorri =

Spanish sprinter

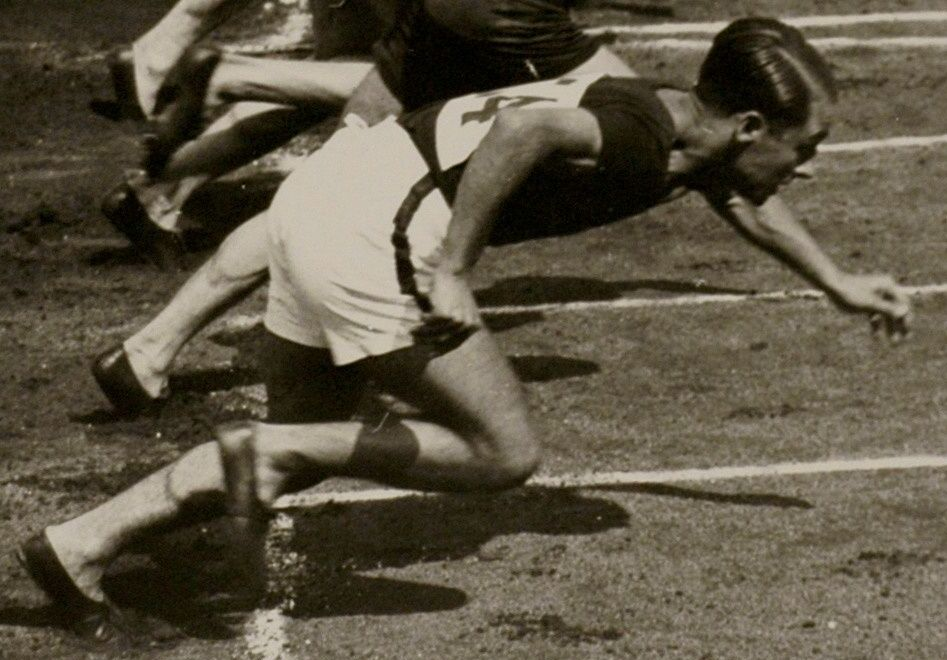
- Fernando Muñagorri in 1928

Personal information
- Nationality: Spanish
- Born: 3 August 1907
- Died: 10 November 1959 (aged 52)

Sport
- Sport: Sprinting
- Event: 100 metres

Fernando Muñagorri (3 August 1907 – 10 November 1959) was a Spanish sprinter. He competed in the men's 100 metres at the 1928 Summer Olympics.
