= Josef Matějček =

Czech weightlifter

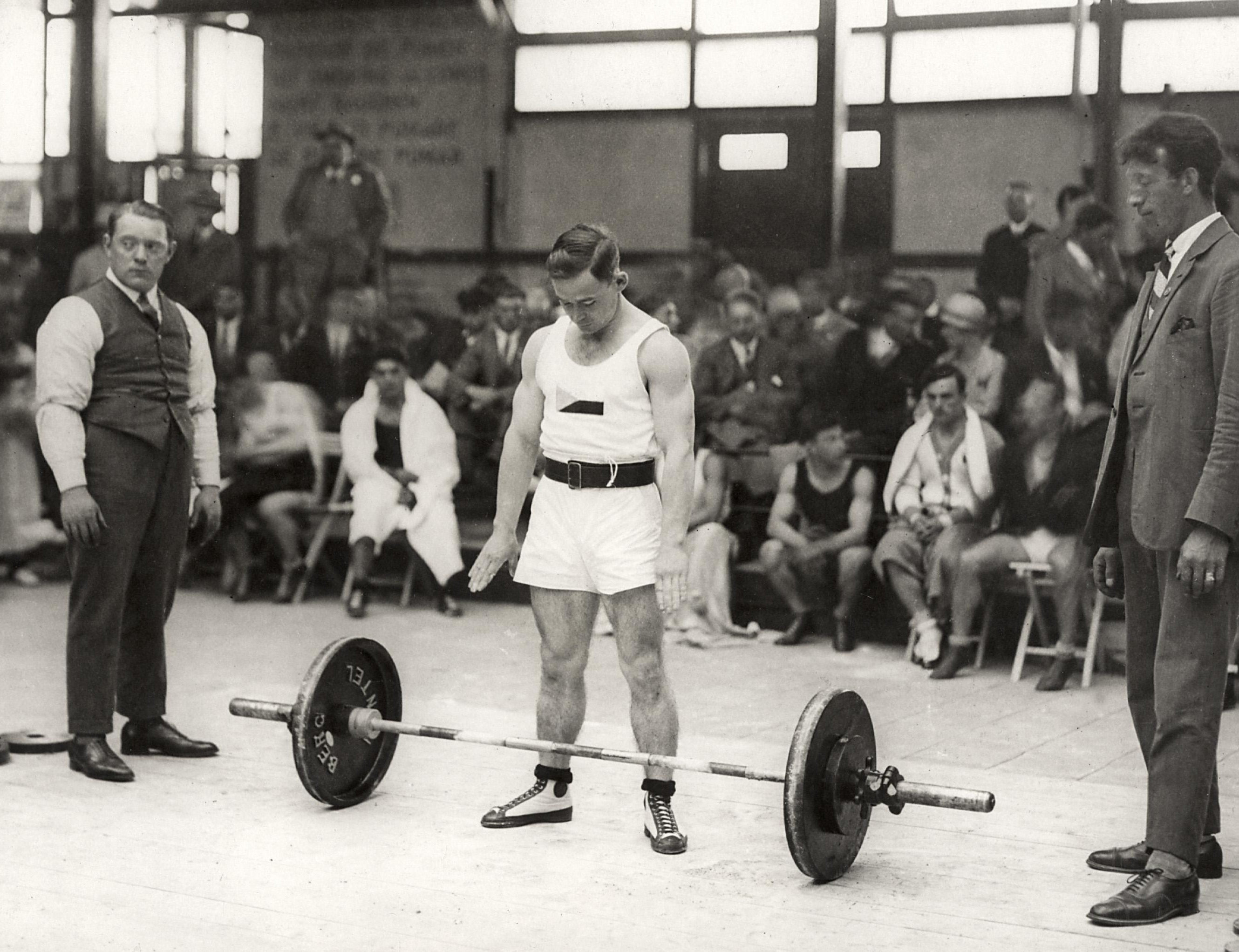
- Josef Matějček at the 1928 Olympics

Personal information
- Born: 1901 Czechoslovakia
- Died: unknown

Sport
- Sport: Weightlifting

Josef Matějček (1901–?) was a weightlifter from Czechoslovakia. He competed at the 1928 Summer Olympics in the lightweight category and finished in 11th place. In the 1930s–1940s he worked as a national weightlifting coach and sports functionary.
