= Otto Schöniger =

Czech equestrian

Personal information
- Nationality: Czech
- Born: 28 December 1889 Jiřice, Bohemia, Austria-Hungary
- Died: July 1958 Prague, Czechoslovakia

Sport
- Sport: Equestrian

Otto Schöniger (28 December 1889 – July 1958) was a Czech equestrian. He competed for Czechoslovakia at the 1924 Summer Olympics, the 1928 Summer Olympics and the 1936 Summer Olympics.
