= Jean Moulin (athlete) =

Luxembourgish sprinter

Personal information
- Nationality: Luxembourgish
- Born: 15 March 1905 Luxembourg City, Luxembourg
- Died: 2 October 1988 (aged 83)

Sport
- Sport: Sprinting
- Event: 100 metres

Jean Moulin (French pronunciation: [ʒɑ̃ mulɛ̃]; 15 March 1905 – 2 October 1988) was a Luxembourgish sprinter. He competed in the men's 100 metres at the 1928 Summer Olympics.
