= Iwao Aizawa =

Japanese sprinter (1906–1945)

Personal information
- Nationality: Japanese
- Born: 29 August 1906 Kanazawa, Ishikawa, Empire of Japan
- Died: October 1945 (aged 39) New Bilibid Prison, Muntinlupa, Commonwealth of the Philippines

Sport
- Sport: Sprinting
- Event: 100 metres

Iwao Aizawa (相沢 巌夫, Aizawa Iwao; 29 August 1906 – October 1945) was a Japanese sprinter. He competed in the men's 100 metres at the 1928 Summer Olympics. He served during World War II, and died in New Bilibid Prison after the war from malaria.
