= Aubrey Burton-Durham =

South African sprinter

Personal information
- Nationality: South African
- Born: 21 August 1906 Johannesburg, Transvaal Colony
- Died: 5 October 1959 (aged 53)

Sport
- Sport: Sprinting
- Event: 100 metres

Aubrey Burton-Durham (21 August 1906 – 5 October 1959) was a South African sprinter. He competed in the men's 100 metres contest at the 1928 Summer Olympics.
