= Emanuel Thiel =

Czech equestrian

Personal information
- Nationality: Czech
- Born: 1 May 1883; Rhede, Germany
- Died: 2 August 1944 (aged 61); Rhede, Germany

Sport
- Sport: Equestrian

Emanuel Thiel (1 May 1883 – 2 August 1944) was a Czechoslovak equestrian. He competed at the 1924 Summer Olympics and the 1928 Summer Olympics.
