= Václav Veselý =

Czechoslovak gymnast (1900–1941)

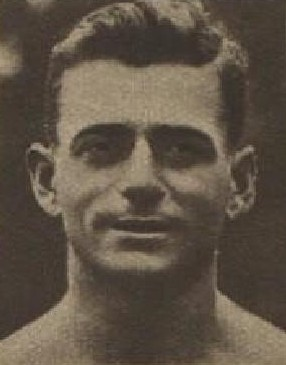

Personal information
- Born: 13 August 1900 Jinonice, Austria-Hungary
- Died: 10 December 1941 (aged 41) Řeporyje, Czechoslovakia

Gymnastics career
- Discipline: Men's artistic gymnastics
- Country represented: Czechoslovakia
Medal record
Men's artistic gymnastics
Representing Czechoslovakia
Olympic Games
| Silver medal – second place | 1928 Amsterdam | Team |

Václav Veselý (13 August 1900, in Jinonice – 10 December 1941, in Řeporyje) was a Czechoslovak gymnast who competed in the 1928 Summer Olympics.
