= Henry Cumming (athlete) =

American sprinter (1905–1945)

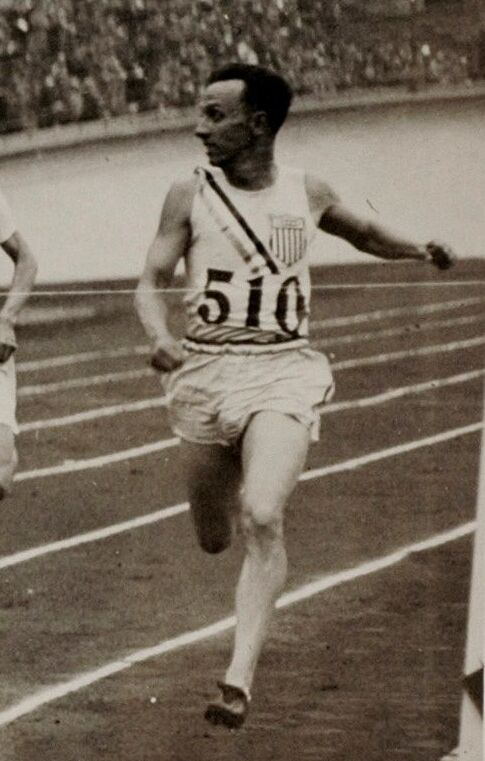
- Cumming in 1928

Personal information
- Born: September 5, 1905 Augusta, Georgia, United States
- Died: May 10, 1945 (aged 39) Florence, Italy

Sport
- Sport: Sprinting
- Event: 200 metres

Henry Cumming (September 5, 1905 – July 10, 1945) was an American sprinter. He competed in the men's 200 metres at the 1928 Summer Olympics.

Cumming commissioned in 1941 as a major in the military intelligence section of the United States Army during World War II, later rising to colonel, serving abroad in Morocco and Italy, dying of polio in Florence on 10 July 1945.
