= Jan Koutný (gymnast) =

Czech gymnast (1897–1976)

- Koutný at the 1924 Summer Olympic Games in Paris, France, cropped from Czechoslovak team photo

Personal information
- Born: 24 June 1897 Vyškov, Austria-Hungary
- Died: 18 July 1976 (aged 79) Prague, Czechoslovakia

Gymnastics career
- Discipline: Men's artistic gymnastics
- Country represented: Czechoslovakia
Medal record
Representing Czechoslovakia
Olympic Games
Men's Gymnastic
Silver medal – second place	1924 Paris	Vault
Silver medal – second place	1928 Amsterdam	Team all-around

Jan Koutný (24 June 1897 – 18 July 1976) was a Czech gymnast who competed for Czechoslovakia in the 1924 Summer Olympics and in the 1928 Summer Olympics. He was born in Vyškov and died in Prague.

In 1924, he won a silver medal in the vault competition. At the 1924 Summer Olympics he also participated in the following events:

- Rings - seventh place
- Individual all-around - eleventh place
- Parallel bars - eleventh place
- Sidehorse vault - twelfth place
- Pommel horse - 22nd place
- Rope climbing - 24th place
- Horizontal bar - 35th place
- Team all-around - did not finish

Four years later, he was a member of the Czechoslovak gymnastic team, which won the silver medal.
