= Ronald Burns (athlete) =

Indian sprinter

Personal information
- Nationality: Indian
- Born: 9 October 1903 Bengal, British India
- Died: 7 June 1985 (aged 81) Perth, Australia

Sport
- Sport: Sprinting
- Event: 100 metres

Ronald Bertram Chesney Burns (9 October 1903 – 7 June 1985) was an sprinter from India. He competed in the men's 100 metres at the 1928 Summer Olympics.
