= Juan Serrahima =

Spanish sprinter

Personal information
- Full name: Juan Serrahima Bofill
- Other names: Joan Serrahima i Bofill
- Nationality: Spanish
- Born: 29 June 1905 Barcelona, Spain
- Died: 11 October 1959 (aged 52) Barcelona, Spain

Sport
- Sport: Sprinting
- Event: 100 metres

Juan Serrahima (29 June 1905 – 11 October 1959) was a Spanish sprinter. He competed in the men's 100 metres at the 1928 Summer Olympics. He was a lawyer.

== Athletic Career ==
- Men's 100 Metres
- Men's 200 Metres
- Mens 4A 100 Metres Relay

== See also ==
- 100 metres
