= Wilhelm Hennings =

Dutch sprinter

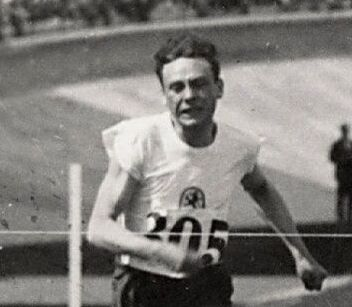
- Hennings at the 1928 Olympics

Personal information
- Born: 20 August 1905 Amsterdam, the Netherlands
- Died: 24 September 1991 (aged 86) Soest, the Netherlands

Sport
- Sport: Athletics
- Event: Sprint
- Club: AAC, Amsterdam

Wilhelm Marie "Wim" Hennings (20 August 1905 – 24 September 1991) was a Dutch sprinter. He competed in the 100 m event at the 1928 Summer Olympics, but failed to reach the final.
