= Vilém Šindler =

Czech middle-distance runner

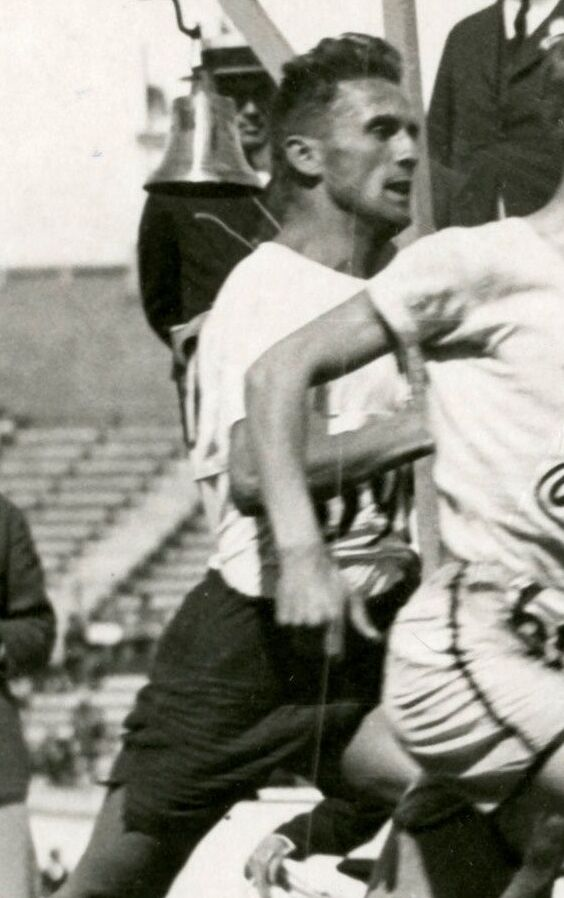
- 1928 Olympics

Personal information
- Nationality: Czech
- Born: 23 November 1903 Nová Bystřice, Austria-Hungary
- Died: 10 May 1982 (aged 78) Brno, Czechoslovakia

Sport
- Sport: Middle-distance running
- Event(s): 800 metres, 1500 metres

Vilém Šindler (23 November 1903 – 10 May 1982) was a Czech middle-distance runner. He competed in both the 800 metres and the 1500 metres at the 1924 Summer Olympics and the 1928 Summer Olympics.
