= Johann Bartl =

Czech sprinter

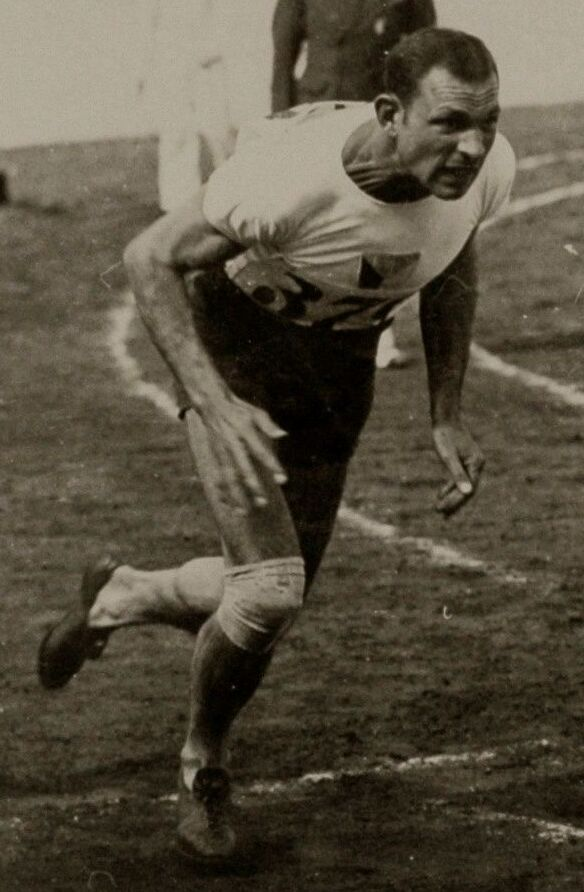
- Johann Bartl in 1928

Personal information
- Nationality: Czech
- Born: 31 July 1905
- Died: between 1939 and 1945

Sport
- Sport: Sprinting
- Event: 100 metres

Johann Bartl (born 31 July 1905, died between 1939 and 1945) was a Czechoslovak sprinter. He competed in the men's 100 metres at the 1928 Summer Olympics.
