= Jaroslav Vykoupil =

Czech sprinter

Personal information
- Nationality: Czech
- Born: 2 February 1898 Šardičky, Moravia, Austria-Hungary
- Died: 21 October 1976 (aged 78) Prague, Czechoslovakia

Sport
- Sport: Sprinting
- Event: 100 metres

Jaroslav Vykoupil (2 February 1898 – 21 October 1976) was a Czech sprinter. He competed for Czechoslovakia in the men's 100 metres at the 1928 Summer Olympics.
