= Josef Šídlo =

Czech cyclist

Personal information
- Full name: Josef Šídlo

Cycling career
- Sport: Cycling

Josef Šídlo (1909 - May 3, 1978) was a Czechoslovsk cyclist. He competed in the individual and team road race events at the 1928 Summer Olympics.
