= Karel Kněnický =

Czech sprinter (1908–1995)

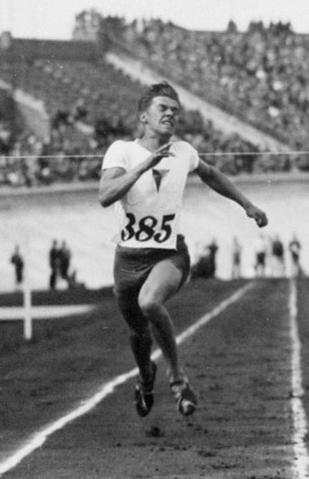
- Kněnický at the 1928 Olympics

Personal information
- Born: 30 March 1908 Prague, Bohemia, Austria-Hungary
- Died: 9 April 1995 (aged 87) Prague, Czech Republic
- Height: 176 cm (5 ft 9 in)
- Weight: 72 kg (159 lb)

Sport
- Sport: Athletics
- Event: Sprint
- Club: VS Praha

Achievements and titles
- Personal best(s): 100 m – 10.8d (1928); 200 m – 22.0 (1935); 400 m – 49.1 (1934)

Karel Kněnický (30 March 1908 – 9 April 1995) was a Czech sprinter. He competed for Czechoslovakia at the 1928 and 1936 Summer Olympics in five 100 m – 400 m events in total, but failed to reach the finals.
