= Cowan (surname) =

Cowan is a surname of both Scottish-Irish and English origins.

== As a Scottish or Irish surname ==
The name Cowan is first seen in the historical record in the UK and Ireland among Briton people in the Scottish and English borderlands. It derives from the old Gaelic MacEoghain or MacEoin (the "mac" prefix meaning "son of") or the Gaelic given name Eoghan. Alternate Anglicized spellings in Scotland include Cowen and Kewon. Similar names with the same derivation in Ireland and Northern Ireland are Coen, Coan, and Coyne, as well as McKeown and McKeon (the Irish prefix "mc" having the same meaning as the Scottish Gaelic "mac").

== Notable people with the surname ==
- Adeline May Cowan, Scottish botanist
- Aileen H. Cowan (1926–2024), Canadian painter and sculptor
- Andrew Cowan (disambiguation), several people
- Austin M. Cowan (1885–1949), Justice of the Kansas Supreme Court
- Barry Cowan (broadcaster), journalist and broadcaster
- Barry Cowan (tennis), former tennis player
- Bernard Cowan (1922–1990), Canadian actor, producer, and writer
- Cathy A. Cowan, American economist and social scientist
- Charles Cowan (1801–1889), Scottish politician and papermaker
- Charles Cowan (cricketer) (1883–1958), Welsh-born English cricketer and naval officer
- Charley Cowan (1938–1998), American football player
- Cindy Cowan, Movie producer
- Claire Cowan, New Zealand composer
- Clyde Cowan, co-discoverer of the neutrino
- Darcy Rivers Warren Cowan, Australian medical practitioner
- David Tennant Cowan (1996–1983), British World War II general known as "Punch" Cowan
- Denys Cowan (born 1961), American comic book artist and television producer
- Donald Cowan (1914–2002), American university president
- Easton Cowan (born 2005), Canadian ice hockey player
- Ed Cowan (born 1982), Australian cricketer
- Edith Cowan (1861–1932), first female member of an Australian parliament
- Edgar Cowan (1815–1885), former U.S. Senator from Pennsylvania
- Elliot Cowan (born 1976), actor
- Ernest Cowan (1882–1955), Western Australian politician
- Ethel Mary Vaughan Cowan (1868–1943), Australian medical doctor
- Glenn Cowan (1952–2004), American table tennis player, involved in Ping Pong Diplomacy
- Harry Cowan (1893–1974), Scottish footballer
- Hector Cowan (1863–1941), American, member of College Football Hall of Fame
- Hendy Cowan (born 1943), Western Australian politician
- Henry Cowan (1862–1932), British politician
- Henry Kenneth Cowan (1900–1971), a British medical practitioner
- Hugh Cowan (1867–1943), a former Canadian church minister, historian, author and editor
- James Alexander Cowan (1901–1978), son of Hugh Cowan, was a Canadian writer and a well known public relations consultant
- James Cowan (author) (1942–2018), Australian author
- James Cowan (British Army officer) (born 1964) Major General, British Army
- James Cowan (South Australian politician) (1848–1890)
- James Cowan (New Zealand writer) (1870–1943)
- James Cowan (sport shooter) (1856–1943), British sport shooter
- James Cowan (footballer) (1868–1918), Scottish footballer
- James Cowan (English cricketer) (born 1989)
- James Cowan (Scottish cricketer) (born 1929)
- Jean Hunter Cowan, Scottish artist
- Jeff Cowan (born 1976), ice hockey player
- Jeremy Cowan (1923–2013), British historian
- Jerome Cowan (1897–1972), actor
- Jimmy Cowan (footballer) (1926–1968), Scottish footballer
- Jimmy Cowan (rugby league) (born 1975), Scottish rugby league footballer
- Jimmy Cowan (born 1982), New Zealand rugby union footballer
- Joe Cowan (born 1984), American football player
- John Cowan (born 1953), American soul music and progressive bluegrass vocalist and bass guitar player
- John Cowan (RAN officer) (born 1957), Australian navy officer
- John Cowan (sheriff), Lord Mayor of London
- John Cowan (South Australian politician)
- John Lancelot Cowan, South Australian politician
- John Macqueen Cowan (1892–1960), Scottish botanist
- John W. Cowan, American programmer involved with Unicode and Lojban
- Joyce Cowan, New Zealand midwifery educator
- Lee Cowan, American news correspondent
- Lawrence Cowan (1858–1933), American politician, lawyer, and businessman
- Louise Cowan (1916–2015), American literary critic and teacher
- Michael Cowan (cricketer) (1933–2022), English cricketer
- Michael L. Cowan (1944–2023), Surgeon General of the United States Navy
- Nelson Cowan, American researcher in psychology, specialized in working memory
- Patrick Cowan, American football player
- Peter Chalmers Cowan (1849–1930), civil engineer
- Philip R. Cowan (fl. 1960s), recipient of the Bronze Wolf Award
- Rachel Cowan (1941–2018), American rabbi
- Ralph Wolfe Cowan (1931–2018), American artist
- Ralph Cowan (politician) (1902–1990), Canadian politician
- Ralph Cowan (cricketer) (born 1960), English cricketer
- Ralph Cowan (footballer), Scottish footballer
- Reed Cowan, American journalist
- Richard Cowan (bass-baritone) (1957–2015), American operatic bass-baritone
- Richard Cowan (cannabis activist), a leader of NORML and proponent of the decriminalization of marijuana
- Richard Cowan (soldier), posthumous recipient of the Medal of Honor
- Riki Cowan (born 1963), New Zealand rugby union player
- Rob Cowan (born 1948), English music broadcaster and writer
- Robert Cowan (governor), Governor of Bombay from 1729 to 1734
- Samuel Cowan (born 1941), British general
- Samuel Cowan (historian) (1835–1914), Scottish historian
- Sidney Cowan (1897–1916), Irish military aviator
- Thomas Cowan (South Australian politician)
- Thomas F. Cowan, New Jersey State Senator and Assemblyman
- Tim Cowan, American football player
- Tom Cowan (born 1969), Scottish footballer
- Tom Cowan (filmmaker) (born 1942), Australian filmmaker
- Tommy Cowan (born 1946), Reggae producer and singer
- Walter Cowan (1871–1956), Royal Navy admiral who saw service in both WWI and WWII
- William "Mo" Cowan (born 1969), U.S. Senator from Massachusetts

== See also ==
- James Cowan (disambiguation)
- John Cowan (disambiguation)
- Thomas Cowan (disambiguation)
- William Cowan (disambiguation)
- Cowen (surname)
