= James Cowan =

James, Jim, or Jimmy Cowan may refer to:

== Law and politics ==
- James Cowan (Ontario politician) (1803–1900), Canadian politician
- James Cowan (Scottish politician) (1816–1895), Scottish MP
- James Cowan (Manitoba physician) (1831–1910), Canadian politician in Manitoba
- James Cowan (South Australian politician) (1848–1890)
- James R. Cowan (1858–1911), American politician in New York
- James Cowan (Manitoba politician) (1914–1997), Canadian politician in Manitoba
- Jim Cowan (born 1942), Canadian senator from Nova Scotia

== Sports ==
- James Cowan (sport shooter) (1856–1943), British sport shooter
- James Cowan (footballer) (1868–1918), Scottish footballer
- Jimmy Cowan (footballer) (1926–1968), Scottish footballer
- James Cowan (Scottish cricketer) (born 1929)
- Jimmy Cowan (rugby league) (born 1975), Scottish rugby league footballer
- Jimmy Cowan (born 1982), New Zealand rugby union footballer
- James Cowan (English cricketer) (born 1989)

== Others ==
- James Cowan (New Zealand writer) (1870–1943), New Zealand writer
- James Alexander Cowan (1901–1978), Canadian writer and public relations consultant
- James Cowan (author) (1942–2018), Australian author
- James Cowan (bishop) (born 1952), Anglican bishop of Columbia
- James Cowan (British Army officer) (born 1964)

== See also ==
- Cowan (surname)
