= Lois Ann Fairley =

Canadian nurse

Lois Ann Fairley RN
- Born: Lois Ann Cowan; July 6, 1931; Toronto, Ontario, Canada
- Died: July 19, 2007 (aged 76); Windsor, Ontario, Canada
- Occupations: Nurse, Patient care advocate, Ontario labour leader, Community Service activist
- Years active: 1955–1993
- Employer: Hôtel-Dieu Grace Hospital
- Organization: Ontario Nurses Association
- Spouse: Henry William Grant Fairley (m. 1955–2007)
- Children: Grant D. Fairley; Brian M. Fairley; John A. Fairley
- Parent(s): James Alexander Cowan and Grace Fenwick Williams
- Relatives: Charles Frederick Williams (Great grandfather); Frederick George H. Williams (Grandfather); Hugh Cowan (Grandfather); John Fitzpatrick (Uncle)

Lois Ann Fairley, RN (née Cowan; July 6, 1931 – July 19, 2007) was a Canadian nurse, a patient care advocate, an Ontario labour leader, and a community service activist.

== Personal life ==
Lois Ann Fairley was born on July 6, 1931, in Toronto, Ontario, Canada to James Alexander Cowan, and Grace Fenwick Williams. She was the granddaughter of the Canadian Presbyterian minister and historian, Hugh Cowan. She was also the granddaughter of Canadian journalist and historian, Fred Williams; the great-granddaughter of the Victorian era war correspondent, writer, and newspaper editor Charles Williams; and the niece of Olympic athlete John Fitzpatrick.

She graduated as a registered nurse at the Grace Hospital and worked there from 1955 until her retirement in 1993. She married Henry William Grant Fairley, a Windsor police officer, on June 25, 1955.

== Career ==
=== Nursing ===
Fairley worked as a registered nurse in her 38 years of nursing career at the Grace Hospital in Windsor, Ontario, Canada from 1955 to 1993. Grace Hospital was founded as a general hospital in 1920. It was closed in 1996 and merged with Hotel-Dieu Hospital. She was noted by her colleagues for her ongoing support for nurses. She was said to be "the heart and soul of nursing in Windsor." She served as a head nurse for various departments in Grace hospital and acted as mentor to student nurses from St. Clair College and The University of Windsor nursing programmes, and was vocal about the workplace issues such as salary and benefits she knew nurses deserved. She was a founding member of the Ontario Nurses Association October 13, 1973.

In October 1975, Bernice Hicks became the President and Fairley was elected as the Ontario Nurses Association President-elect. In November 1976, Fairley became president of the Ontario Nurses Association. In January 1977, the Ontario Nurses Association and the Ontario Hospital Association agree that "province-wide bargaining is desirable." During her presidency, the pivotal declaration on the importance of nurses in patient care is released. The ONA Health Review is entitled "Let Us Take Care" and achieves widespread and positive media coverage for nurses in the profession. 120,000 copies are distributed in the first-printing. "The public and media respond with calls with more money for mental health programs, a halt to the decline in health care and an end to abuse in hospitals." Nursing gains a positive reputation in the public. Her term is ended in November 1977 and she was replaced by the next Ontario Nurses Association President Sharon Thompson. Fairley also served as a member of the Board of Directors of the Registered Nurses' Association of Ontario. She served from 1984 to 1986 as the RNAO member-at-large for socio-economic welfare. She also championed "Project Turnabout", a support group to help nurses struggling with drug and/or alcohol addictions.

== Recognition ==
Following her death in 2007, an award for nurses was named after her, the Lois A. Fairley Nurse of the Year Community Service Award. The award was given to nurses in Windsor and Essex area in recognition for the care and compassion to patients, and contributions to the field of nursing. The award is given by the Windsor – Essex Chapter of the Registered Nurses' Association of Ontario.

Lois A. Fairley Nursing Award recipients since 2008
Year	Recipient	Organization	Reference
2026	Spenser Dionne	Windsor Regional Hospital	
2025	Marisa Smith	Windsor Regional Hospital	
2024	Anna Dudok	Huron Lodge Long-term Care	
2023	Mary Cunningham	Windsor Regional Hospital	
2022	Nurses who came out of retirement during the pandemic	N/A	
2021	All the Nurses of Windsor and Essex County during the COVID-19 pandemic	N/A	
2020	All the Nurses of Windsor and Essex County during the COVID-19 pandemic	N/A	
2019	Barb Deter	Windsor Essex County Health Unit	
2018	Douglas Mercer	Windsor Regional Hospital	
2017	Francoise Stanutz	The Hospice of Windsor-Essex County	
2016	Marylynn Holzel	Windsor Regional Hospital	
2015	Rita Di Biase	Windsor Regional Hospital	
2014	Eva Lewis	Leamington District Memorial Hospital	
2013	Shauna Carter	Hotel-Dieu Grace Hospital	
2012	Ursula DeBono	Windsor Regional Hospital	
2011	Carole Gill	The Hospice of Windsor-Essex County	
2010	Terry Johnston	Windsor Regional Cancer Clinic	
2009	Georgina Kelly	Hotel-Dieu Grace Hospital	
2008	Linda Moroun	Windsor Regional Hospital	

== Death ==
She died at the age of 76 on July 19, 2007, at the Hospice Village in Windsor, Ontario, Canada after succumbing to cancer. Her resting place is at the Greenlawn Memorial Gardens in Oldcastle, Ontario.
