= John Cowan (disambiguation) =

John Cowan (born 1952) is an American musician.

John Cowan may also refer to:

== Politics and law ==
- John Cowan, Lord Cowan (1798–1878), senator of the College of Justice in Scotland
- Sir John Cowan, 1st Baronet, of London (1774–1842), Lord Mayor of London
- John Cowan (Newfoundland politician) (1847–1927), politician in Newfoundland
- John F. Cowan (1858–1917), North Dakota lawyer, politician, attorney general, and judge
- Sir John Cowan (Australian politician) (1866–1953), Australian politician
- John Lancelot Cowan (1893–1971), Australian politician
- John Cowan (Georgia politician) (1975–), Georgia politician

== Science and medicine ==
- John Black Cowan (1828–1896), professor of medicine at the University of Glasgow
- John Cowan (physician) (fl. 1870s), American physician and phrenologist
- John Macqueen Cowan (1892–1960), Scottish botanist

== Sports ==
- John Cowan (footballer, born 1870) (1870–1937), Scottish footballer
- Johnnie Cowan (1913–1993), American baseball player
- John Cowan (footballer, born 1949), Northern Ireland international footballer

== Others ==
- Sir John Cowan, 1st Baronet, of Beeslack (1814–1900), Scottish philanthropist
- Sir John Cowan (steel merchant) (1844–1929), Scottish iron and steel merchant
- John Cowan (photographer) (1929–1979), British fashion photographer
- John Cowan (RAN officer) (born 1957), Australian navy officer
- John W. Cowan, American computer programmer

== See also ==
- Jon Cowan, American television producer and writer
- Jack Cowan (1927–2000), footballer
- Jack D. Cowan (1933–2025), British mathematician and theoretical neuroscientist
- John Cowans (1862–1921), British Army officer
- John K. Cowen (1844–1904), American railroad executive and congressman
- Cowan (surname)
- Cowan (disambiguation)
