= Hugh Cowan =

Canadian minister (1867–1943)

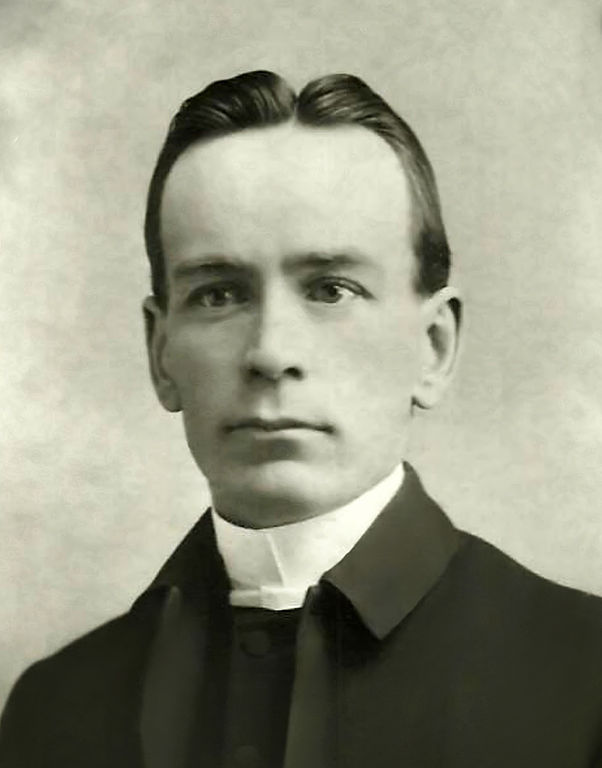
- Born: Hugh Cowan; May 20, 1867; Bentinck, Ontario, Canada
- Died: April 19, 1943 (aged 75); Owen Sound, Ontario, Canada
- Education: Queen's Theological College (Bachelor of Divinity); Knox College – Toronto (Master of Arts); Manitoba College (Bachelor of Arts)
- Occupations: Church Minister, author, editor, historian
- Spouse: Jean Eloise Wood (1899–1943)
- Children: Among others: James Alexander Cowan and Grace Edith Cowan (married to John Fitzpatrick)
- Parent(s): John Cowan; Mary McLean
- Relatives: Lois Ann Fairley (Granddaughter)

Rev. Hugh Cowan (May 20, 1867 – April 19, 1943) was a Presbyterian Church in Canada and later United Church of Canada minister, author, editor and historian.

== Background ==
Hugh Cowan was born on May 20, 1867, in Bentinck, Ontario, Canada to John Cowan and Mary McLean both of whom were born in Scotland.

In 1893, he finished his Bachelor of Arts degree in Manitoba College. He pursued his Master of Arts at Knox College, Toronto in 1896. He later pursued his Bachelor of Divinity degree at Kingston, Ontario's Queen's Theological College and graduated in 1905.

During Cowan's first ministry at Rutherford Presbyterian Church in Dawn-Euphemia, he met Jean Eloise Wood. They were married on October 31, 1899, in London, Ontario.

Hugh Cowan and Jean Eloise Wood had three daughters and six sons.

== Career ==
=== Church ministry ===
Cowan was ordained by the Chatham Presbytery of the Presbyterian Church in Canada on August 17, 1897.

Cowan served as a pastor in Oakdale United Church (formerly known as Oakdale Presbyterian Church), and Rutherford Presbyterian Church in Lambton County from 1897 to 1900, in St. Andrew's Presbyterian Church in North Easthope and Shakespeare Presbyterian Church in Shakespeare, Perth County, Ontario from 1900 to 1905, a minister in charge of St. Paul's Presbyterian Church in Harwhich Township, Kent County, Ontario, Bethel Presbyterian Church, and The Ridge Presbyterian Church from 1905 to 1913, in Haynes Ave. Church in St. Catharines from 1914 to 1916, Chalmer's Presbyterian Church in Toronto from 1919 to 1921, and in High Park Presbyterian Church in 1922.

From 1925 to 1937, in various congregations of the United Church of Canada, he served as a minister at Bethel United Church near Chatham, Ontario, as a pastor at MacLennan, Desbarats and Portlock near Sault Ste. Marie, and Sault Suburban Church area charge in Sault Ste. Marie.

Cowan retired in 1937.

=== Other ===
He authored numerous books during his time. One was Canadian Achievement in the Province of Ontario, where he wrote about the achievements of the Canadian people in Detroit River District, Essex county, Windsor, and the whole province of Ontario. The book was recently republished on April 9, 2012, as Ontario and the Detroit Frontier 1701–1814. Another book on Chatham, Ontario including Kent County and Lambton County includes information on the Underground Railway as well as the early history of the communities in the area. The book was created as part of the Canadian Achievement in the Province of Ontario but currently only exists in a galley proof in The Chatham Public Library.

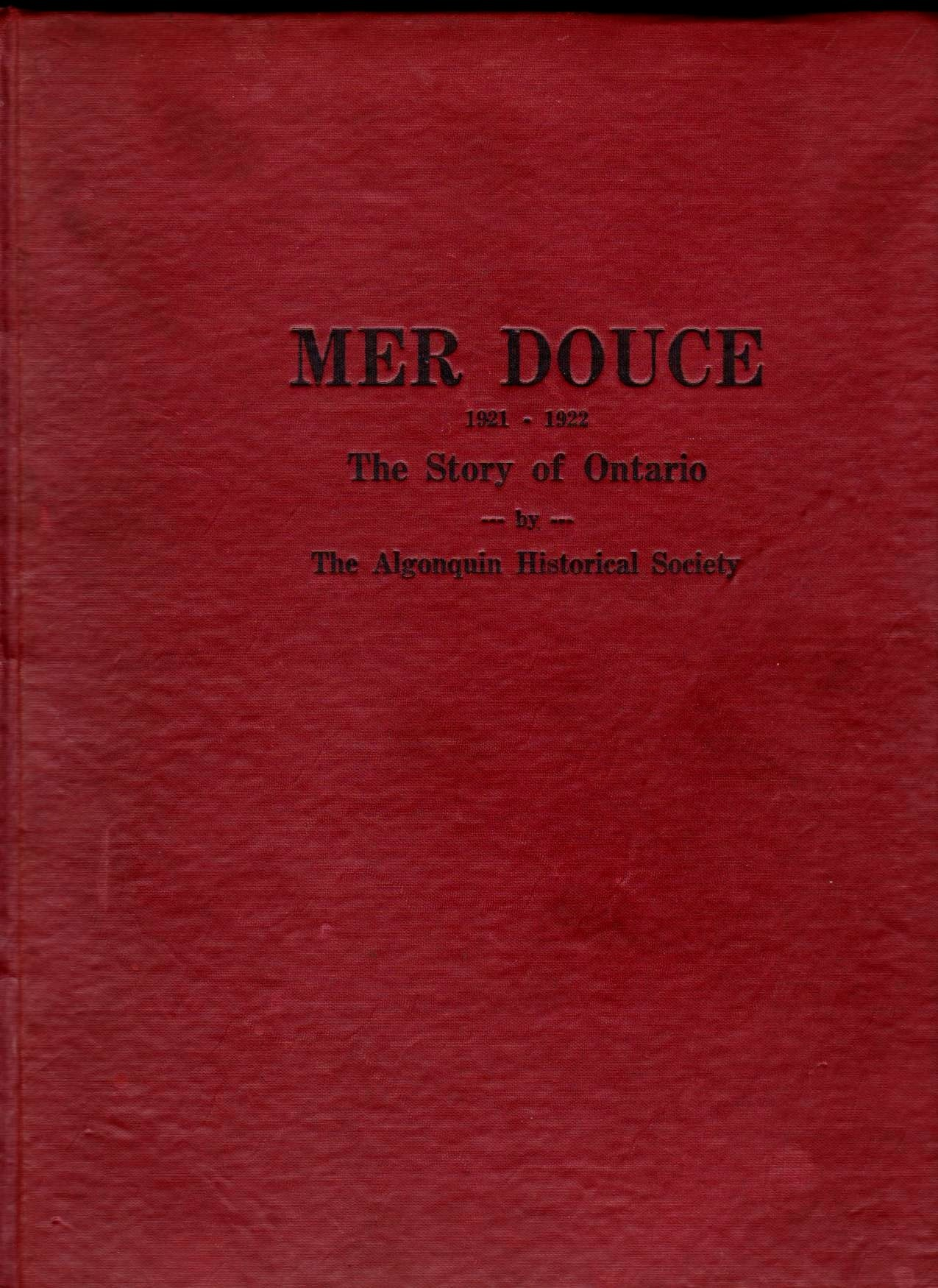
Mer Douce, a book by Cowan which details the history and life in Ontario.

Another of his histories was Gold and Silver Jubilee, Sault Ste. Marie, Canada, incorporated a town, 1887, a city, 1912 detailing the history of Sault Ste. Marie, that includes illustration of its port and map of the city. Mer Douce was an historical magazine later published in book form, that includes articles of history and life in the Georgian Bay, Manitoulin Island, Parry Sound and other communities of Ontario. It is considered an important historical reference in the region.

He also wrote a fictional book entitled La Cloche. The Story of Hector MacLeod and His Misadventures in the Georgian Bay and the La Cloche Districts is an adventure tale of a United Loyal Empire Loyalist set in Georgian Bay, Ontario of what was then Upper Canada. The book was recently republished on April 3, 2014, under the title The Misadventures of Hector MacLeod: In the Georgian Bay and the La Cloche Districts.

Cowan also served as the managing editor of Algonquin Historical Society of Canada.

Hugh Cowan also published a book reflecting the progress of Christianity over his years of ministry and some of the major questions he encountered. It was published in 1937 and was entitled The Great Drama of Human Life. The book was recently republished on January 30, 2014, under its original title.

== Death ==
Cowan died at the General and Marine Hospital in Owen Sound, Ontario on April 19, 1943, at the age of 73. His resting place is at the Greenwood Cemetery in Owen Sound, Ontario.

== See also ==
- List of Canadian historians
