= Cowan =

Cowan or Cowans may refer to:

== Places ==
=== Australia ===
- Cowan, New South Wales
- Cowan Creek, a waterway to the north of Sydney, Australia
- Division of Cowan, a federal division of the Australian House of Representatives, in Western Australia
- Hundred of Cowan, a cadastral division in South Australia

=== Canada ===
- Cowan, Manitoba

=== United States ===
- Cowan, California
- Cowan, Indiana
- Cowan, Pennsylvania
- Cowan, Tennessee
- Cowans Brook, a stream in Minnesota

== Other uses ==
- Cowan (surname), a surname
- EML Admiral Cowan (M313), a Sandown-class minehunter of the Estonian Navy

== See also ==
- Cowen (disambiguation)
- Parkinson Cowan, a brand of cooking appliances
- Rich & Cowan, UK book publishing company
