= Fred Williams (journalist) =

English–Canadian journalist, writer and historian

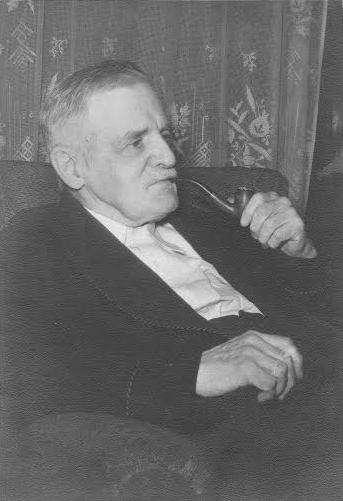
- Born: Frederick George Hilary Williams; January 13, 1863; Clapham, London, United Kingdom
- Died: June 16, 1944 (aged 81); Toronto, Ontario, Canada
- Resting place: St. James Cemetery, Toronto, Ontario, Canada
- Citizenship: Canadian
- Occupations: Journalist, writer, and historian
- Years active: 1882–1944
- Organization: Parliamentary Press Gallery
- Spouse: Aley Mary Shonfeld
- Children: Rupert Fenwick Williams, and Grace Fenwick Williams (married to James Alexander Cowan)
- Parents: Charles Frederick Williams; Georgina Gould Ward
- Relatives: Joan Alisten Meuser, Lois Ann Fairley, and James Douglas Cowan (Grandchildren)
- Awards: North West Canada Medal

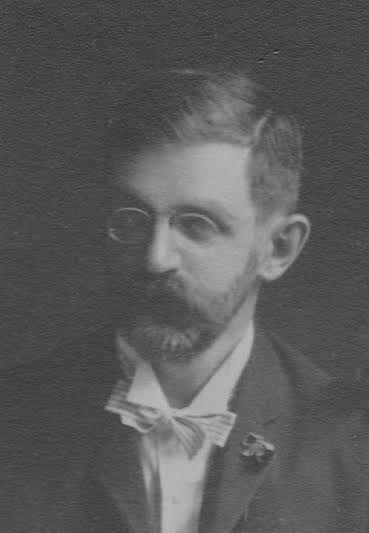
A young Fred Williams.

Frederick George Hilary Williams (January 13, 1863, in Clapham, London, United Kingdom – June 16, 1944, in Toronto, Ontario, Canada) was an English–Canadian journalist, writer, and historian.

== Background ==
Fred Williams was the son of the respected war correspondent and journalist Charles Frederick Williams, and of Georgina Gould Ward.

== Career ==
=== Newspaper ===
Fred Williams began his newspaper career in January 1882 at the age of 19 serving first at the Montreal Herald and later at the Montreal Gazette. His career in journalism would span more than sixty years. He also served The Montreal Star, The Toronto News, The Ottawa Free Press, The Victoria Colonist, The Vancouver Sun, The Toronto Mail and Empire, and The Globe and Mail. He went to Australia as a reporter from 1893–1896. He served as a city editor, telegraph editor, news editor, editorial writer as well as a reporter. He became a freelance writer in 1918 with a syndicated column on Canadian history.

Williams also covered Canadian federal politics as a member of the Canadian Parliamentary Press Gallery in Ottawa for 25 years and served on its executive. He knew Sir John A. Macdonald, Canada's first Prime Minister, Sir Wilfrid Laurier, and all the eminent men who were their colleagues and successors. On June 6, 1891, Williams was the reporter on duty who was first reported the death of Prime Minister MacDonald. The two greatest speeches he ever heard were both by Canadian Prime Minister Laurier given in the Canadian Parliament. The first was a tribute to Prime Minister MacDonald on the occasion of his death. The second was in praise of Queen Victoria following her death in 1901. His work in the Canadian Parliamentary Press Gallery was recognized as he left the Ottawa Free Press for British Columbia in 1912 at a farewell party that included an engraved gold handled silk umbrella and valuable case of pipes.

By the end of his career in journalism that spanned 62 years, he was referred to as the "grand old man of journalism."

=== Canadian history ===
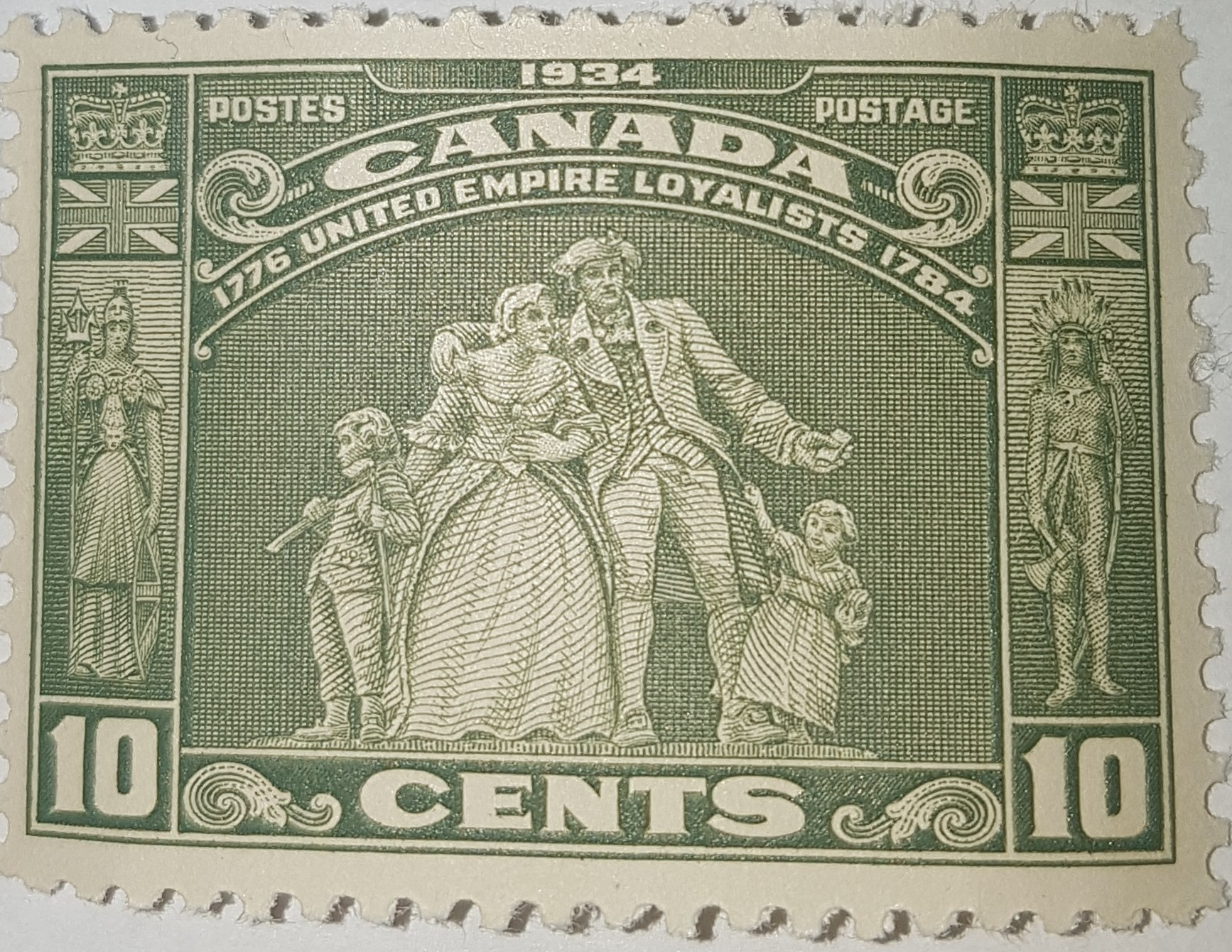
The 1934 Canadian 10-cent stamp featuring the 150th anniversary of the United Empire Loyalists being established in Canada.

One of his contributions to a popular understanding of Canadian history was his regular series of articles reviewing events that occurred on particular dates in Canada's story. Through these articles, he was said to have done more than any other individual to make Canadians "history conscious" through his care to provide an authentic and accurate portrayal of events. The series first began with the Toronto Mail and Empire newspaper with a daily feature entitled "Do You Know?" This series was eventually syndicated and quoted across the continent. The Montreal Gazette remarked, "Day by day Mr. Williams delves into the history of this country bringing to light finer details of the past than our present histories contain. He goes into the byways of forgotten places, breathes life into the character of an earlier age and keeps before us historical dates we are too apt to forget." He also had a syndicated column through the Toronto Daily Star known as "Lest We Forget" that also recounted Canadian history. Williams gave historical talks to encourage an appreciation of Canadian history and was enjoyed as a speaker.

In 1934, a Canadian 10-cent stamp featuring the 150th anniversary of the United Empire Loyalists being established in Canada was the result of William's suggestion. Williams was referred to as "the brilliant Ontario historian." This stamp was awarded fourth place among the postage stamp designs of 1934 by a world consensus of philatelists.

Currently, his article on the death of John Crooks of the War of 1812 is featured on the Ontario War of 1812 history website.

=== Author ===
Williams and his wife Aley Mary Shonfeld Williams co-authored The Canadian Book of Days in 1924.

=== Others ===
Williams also served as a gunner with the Montreal Garrison Artillery that was sent in 1885 to combat the North-West Rebellion in Manitoba. He fought in the battles of Fish Creek, Cut Knife, and Batoche. He received the North West Canada Medal for his service. Their trip constituted the first passenger train trip from Montreal to Winnipeg.

Fred Williams first learned of the death of his father, Charles Williams, the famous war correspondent, on the wire service he was monitoring at his newspaper in Toronto, Ontario, Canada.

== Death ==
Williams died on June 16, 1944, at his home in Toronto, Ontario, Canada at the age of 81. The funeral was held at St. James Cathedral in Toronto and was led by the Dean of Toronto and rector, C. E. Riley. In attendance at the funeral of Fred Williams were the leading publishers and journalists of Canada. Among the honorary pallbearers were J.E. Atkinson, Main Johnson and Russell Fox of The Toronto Star; George McCullagh, Hector Charlesworth, J. V. McAree and A. A. McIntosh of The Globe and Mail, C. O. Knowles of the Evening Telegram; B. K. Sandwell, Saturday Night magazine; H. Napier Moore and Lieut.-Col. J. B. Maclean, Macleans Publications; C. H. Carpenter, the Montreal Gazette; E. Norman Smith, the Ottawa Journal; Floyd S. Chalmers, the Financial Post; and F. D. J. Smith, formerly with the Mail and Empire. At his funeral, he was referred to as "the dean of Canadian journalists" and "the grand old man of journalism." One newspaper in its obituary described him as someone who "stood alone" in his field whose "friends were legion." He was buried at St. James Cemetery in Toronto, Ontario with military honours.
