= List of Harlequin Romance novels released in 1954 =

This is a list of Harlequin Romance novels released in 1954. (Main index: List of Harlequin Romance novels)

== Releases ==
Number	Title	Author	Date	Citations
# 265	The Paw In The Bottle	Raymond Marshall	1954	
# 266	Catalina	W. Somerset Maugham	1954	
# 267	I'll Bury My Dead	James Hadley Chase	1954	
# 268	The Unholy Woman	Jean Plaidy	1954	
# 269	Queen Jezebel	Jean Plaidy	1954	
# 270	Fighting Buckaroo	Paul Evan Lehman	1954	
# 271	Mind Your Manners	Claire Wallace	1954	
# 272	The Fabulous Nell Gwynne	Lozania Prole	1954	
# 273	Holy Deadlock	A. P. Herbert	1954	
# 274	Lost Valley	Al Cody	1954	
# 275	Hell's Horseman	William Hopson	1954	
# 276	Conflict	E. V. Timms	1954	
# 277	Lady Of China Street	Mark Corrigan	1954	
# 278	The Bait And The Trap	George Challis	1954	
# 279	Crime On My Hands	Carl G. Hodges	1954 (Note: Reprinted)	
# 280	The Nut Brown Maid	Philip Lindsay	1954	
# 281	Outlaw Deputy	Murray Leinster	1954	
# 282	Frozen Frontier	Walter W. Liggett	1954	
# 283	A Body For A Blonde	Ken Mcleod	1954	
# 284	Calling Nurse Blair	Lucy Agnes Hancock	1954	
# 285	Texas Outlaw	Al Cody	1954	
# 286	Colonel Blood	Max Peacock	1954	
# 287	Gina	George Albert Glay	1954 (Note: Reprint from 1949)	
# 288	Bright Path To Adventure	Gordon Sinclair	1954	
# 289	The Black Donnellys	Thomas P. Kelley	1954	
# 290	The Violent Years	E. V. Timms	1954	
# 291	Heart Of Asia	Roy Chapman Andrews	1954	
# 292	Nurse Barlow	Lucy Agnes Hancock	1954	
# 293	Mona	M. Coates Webster	1954	
# 294	Girls in White	Rona Randall	1954 (Note: Reprinted)	
# 295	Lost House	Frances Shelley Wees	1954 (Note: Reprinted)	
# 296	Half-Caste	Eric Baume	1954	
# 297	The Vice Merchants	Reed McCary	1954	
# 298	Pride's Fancy	Thomas H. Raddall	1954	
# 299	Copper	Lieut. Tom McGrath	1954	
# 300	Mallory	Raymond Marshall	1954	
# 301	Mary Read, Buccaneer	Philip Rush	1954	
# 302	The Nurse	Lucy Agnes Hancock	1954	
# 303	Captain Gentleman	Verne Fletcher	1954	
# 304	High Saddle	William Hopson	1954	
# 305	Out Of The Night	Robert O. Saber	1954	
# 306	Fabian Of The Yard	Robert Fabian	1954	
# 307	The Cage	Sydney Horley	1954	
# 308	Doctor Paul	Bette Allan	1954	
# 309	Notched Guns	William Hopson	1954	
# 310	Why Pick On Me?	Raymond Marshall	1954	
# 311	Convicted	David Goodis	1954	
# 312	The Seeker	Thomson Burtis	1954	
# 313	Hospital Nurse	Lucy Agnes Hancock	1954	
# 314	Forbidden	Lois Bull	1954	
# 315	The Black Eagle	Thomson Burtis	1954	
# 316	This Way For A Shroud	James Hadley Chase	1954	
# 317	Blondes' Requiem	Raymond Marshall	1954	
# 318	The Half-Breed	M. Constantin-Weyer	1954	
# 319	Woman Doctor	Dorothy Pierce Walker	1954	
# 320	The Deathless Amazon	John Russell Fearn	1954	
# 321	London After Dark	Robert Fabian	1954	
# 322	The Web	Sydney Horler	1954	
