= Public service announcement =

Message in the public interest communicated widely

HHS public service announcement
A PSA from the U.S. Department of Health and Human Services regarding H1N1 prevention.

A public service announcement (PSA) is a message in the public interest disseminated by the media without charge to raise public awareness and change behavior. Oftentimes these messages feature unsettling imagery, ideas or behaviors that are designed to startle or even scare the viewer into understanding the consequences of undergoing a particular harmful action or inaction. For example, a PSA may show imagery of drug users before and after their addiction, or realistic skits of domestic violence situations, as well as explain the importance of avoiding such choices. In the UK, they are generally called a public information film (PIF); in Hong Kong, they are known as an announcement in the public interest (API).

== History ==
The earliest public service announcements (in the form of moving pictures) were made before and during the Second World War years in both the UK and the US.

In the UK, amateur actor Richard Massingham set up Public Relationship Films Ltd in 1938 as a specialist agency for producing short educational films for the public. In the films, he typically played a bumbling character who was slightly more stupid than average and often explained the message of the film by demonstrating the risks if it were ignored. The films covered topics such as how to cross the road, how to prevent the spread of diseases, how to swim, and how to drive without causing the road to be unsafe for other users. During the war, he was commissioned by the UK Ministry of Information to produce films for the war effort. Massingham began to produce longer films, for both private companies and the Government, after the War.

In the US, the Ad Council (initially called the War Advertising Council) was set up in 1941, when America entered World War II. It began implementing on a massive scale the idea of using advertising to influence American society on a range of fronts. Its first campaigns focused on the country's needs during World War II, such as encouraging the American public to invest their savings in government bonds.

== In different countries ==
=== United Kingdom ===
After the war, PIFs were used to educate the public on a broader range of issues. In the UK, they were produced for the Central Office of Information (COI), and again by private contractors, which were usually small film companies, such as Richard Taylor Cartoons. They were supplied to broadcasters free of charge for use at any time. Their utility as a cost-free means to fill the gaps in commercial breaks left by unsold advertising airtime has led to their regular usage since the 1960s.

=== United States ===
The most common topics of PSAs are health and safety, such as the multimedia "Emergency Preparedness & Safety Tips On Air and Online" talk radio campaign. A typical PSA is part of a public awareness campaign to inform or educate the public about an issue such as obesity or compulsive gambling.

One of the earliest television public service announcements came in the form of Smokey Bear whose "Only you can prevent forest fires" campaign ran for decades. Other common early themes were traffic safety, especially safe crossing, wearing seat belts and not driving drunk, and the dangers of cigarette smoking.

A charitable organization may enlist the support of a celebrity for a PSA; examples include actress Kathryn Erbe telling people to be green and Crips gang leader Stanley Williams speaking from prison to urge youths not to join gangs or commit crimes.

Some television shows featuring very special episodes made PSAs after the episodes. For example, Law & Order: Special Victims Unit talked about child abduction in one episode, with a PSA about child abduction airing after the episode. After My Sister Sam was canceled in 1988, surviving cast members Pam Dawber, Joel Brooks, Jenny O'Hara, and David Naughton were reunited to film a PSA for the Center to Prevent Handgun Violence on gun control after the murder of their co-star, Rebecca Schaeffer, who was gunned down by a crazed fan on July 18, 1989, at Schaeffer's apartment in Los Angeles.

During the 1980s, many American cartoon shows contained PSAs at the end of their shows to satisfy federal regulations that required programming for children to be educational. Examples include the closing moral segments at the end of He-Man and the Masters of the Universe, the "Knowing is Half the Battle" epilogues in G.I. Joe: A Real American Hero, The Transformers, Jem, M.A.S.K., Inspector Gadget, and the "Sonic Says" segments from Adventures of Sonic the Hedgehog.

PSAs are used as placeholders for unsold commercials.

=== China ===
China's first PSA was published in 1986, which was about saving water (title: "请君注意，节约用水", lit. 'Please note: Conserve water.') and was made and broadcast on Guiyang television. In Hong Kong, terrestrial television networks have been required since National Day 2004 to preface their main evening news broadcasts with a minute-long announcement in the public interest, which plays the Chinese National Anthem in Mandarin over various patriotic montages. (Note: Examples from 2009 and 2012.)

=== Malaysia ===
PSAs in Malaysia were produced in two mediums, namely messages and songs. Filem Negara Malaysia (FNM) became the early pioneers of PSAs from its establishment in 1946 until its merger with the National Film Development Corporation Malaysia (FINAS) in 2013. PSAs produced by FNM have topics such as dengue fever, drug addiction, environmental pollution, road safety and electricity usage. Governmental agencies such as the Ministry of Health have produced PSAs to promote their Healthy Lifestyle Campaign, which was held annually from 1991 to 2013, with the "Utamakan Kesihatan" ("Choose Health") logo appearing at the end of their ads, most notably PSAs about AIDS.

PSAs on road safety were produced by the Ministry of Transport, particularly on accidents amongst motorcyclists and alcohol consumption amongst drivers. Some of their ads also use the "Anda Mampu Mengubahnya" ("You Can Make a Difference") slogan and also use some of the famous actors and actresses, including the late Adibah Noor and Nabil Ahmad. Ministry of Science, Technology and the Environment also produces PSAs focusing on environmental pollution, most notably the 1994 PSA entitled "Hentikan Pencemaran" ("Stop the Pollution"). PSAs on corruption and bribery were produced by the Malaysian Anti-Corruption Agency (now the Malaysian Anti-Corruption Commission). Most of these PSAs were aired on Radio Televisyen Malaysia (RTM) and TV Pendidikan between the 1990s and 2000s. Private TV networks like TV3 have also produced in-house PSAs, covering topics such as not downloading pirated content, some of which feature actress and infotainer, Janna Nick; and domestic violence which features actress Eyra Hazali.

There was a series of animated PSAs that was made by Filem Negara Malaysia from 2008 till 2013, which is also commonly known as "Pak Abu PSAs" and was frequently shown on Malaysian TV channels.

In 2021, the Malaysian government produced a series of PSAs known as "Lindung Diri, Lindung Semua" ("Protect Yourself, Protect All"). The PSAs cover information about COVID-19 vaccines and the benefits of vaccination. The series also features the Prime Minister of Malaysia at that time, Muhyiddin Yassin.

== Festivals and contests ==
IAA Responsibility Awards is an annual international festival of public service announcements, held by the International Advertising Association since 2008.

== See also ==
- Public affairs (broadcasting)
- Public relations
- Public information film
- Propaganda techniques
