= John Fitzpatrick (athlete) =

Canadian sprinter (1907–1989)

John Richardson Fitzpatrick
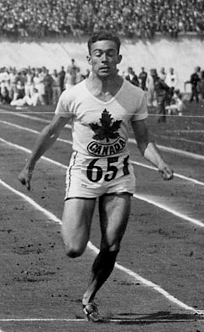
- John Fitzpatrick at the 1928 Olympics

Personal information
- Full name: John Richardson Fitzpatrick
- Nickname: Johnny Fitzpatrick
- Born: March 21, 1907 Toronto, Ontario, Canada
- Died: July 9, 1989 (aged 82) Toronto, Ontario, Canada
- Education: Engineering (1933); University of Toronto
- Occupation(s): Athlete, engineer, inventor
- Height: 5 ft 9 in (175 cm)
- Weight: 132 lb (60 kg)
- Spouse: Grace Edith Cowan

Sport
- Country: Canada
- Sport: Track and field (1927–1930), Canadian football (1928–1932)
- Event: Sprint
- University team: Toronto Varsity Blues
- League: Interprovincial Rugby Football Union (IRFU)
- Club: Hamilton Olympic Club
- Team: Hamilton Tigers

Achievements and titles
- Olympic finals: 1928 Summer Olympics: Men's 200 m: Fifth place
- Personal best(s): 100 m – 10.6 (1930); 200 m – 21.7e (1928)
Medal record
Representing Canada
British Empire Games
Gold medal – first place	1930 Hamilton	4×110 yards
Silver medal – second place	1930 Hamilton	220 yards
Bronze medal – third place	1930 Hamilton	100 yards
- Updated on January 2, 2015

John Richardson Fitzpatrick (March 21, 1907 – July 9, 1989) was a Canadian athlete who competed in the 1928 Summer Olympics.

== Background ==
Fitzpatrick was born on March 21, 1907, in Toronto, Ontario, Canada to John Duncan Fitzpatrick and Agnes Elizabeth Willson.

While enrolled at the University of Toronto, he was a member of the intercollegiate championship team in 1927. He completed a degree in engineering at the University of Toronto, graduating in 1933. In 1934, he married Grace Cowan, the daughter of Hugh Cowan and the sister of James Alexander Cowan, in Toronto. They had two sons, John McGillivray Fitzpatrick and Murray Alan Stuart Fitzpatrick.

== Career ==
After serving briefly with the Royal Canadian Mounted Police, he went on to work at Shell Canada researching diesel engines and fuels. A career in sales followed with construction companies in Toronto and Hamilton. In the early 1960s, Fitzpatrick worked for the Ontario's Ministry of Highways, rising to the position of deputy chief of the equipment section.

=== Athlete ===
Fitzpatrick raced out of the Hamilton Olympic Club. He played with the Hamilton Tigers as a senior member in 1926 and 1928, wherein they won the Grey Cup. In the same year, he was able to become part of Canada's Olympic track and field team. He competed in the 100 meters where he finished fifth place and in the 200 meter race where he finished as a semifinalist. He was also a member of the Canadian relay team where they competed in the 4 x 100 meter relay; they were disqualified. In 1930, he won Canada's first medal at the inaugural 1930 British Empire Games held in Hamilton.

When he entered the university, he was considered an important member of the University of Toronto Varsity Blues from 1929 to 1932. During his last year with the Varsity Blues, they were able to win the Yates Cup. He was also a leading member of intercollegiate track championship teams from 1927 to 1930. Within those three years, he won 10 medals wherein 7 of which are gold.

In 1932 to 1933, he served in the University of Toronto Men's Athletic Directorate.

== Competition record ==
Year	Competition	Venue	Position	Event	Notes
Representing Canada
1930	British Empire Games	Hamilton, Canada	3rd	100 y	10.2

=== Inventor ===
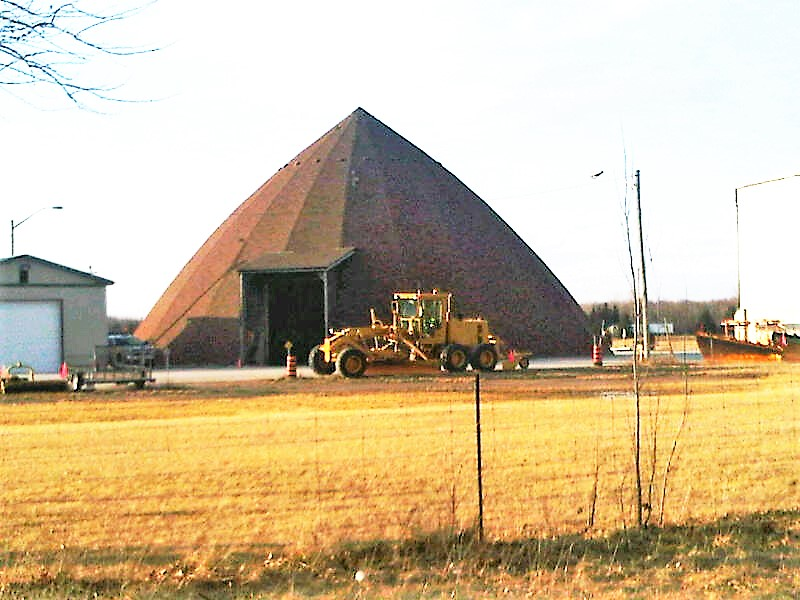
A Fitzpatrick Dome.

John Fitzpatrick invented a structure known as the Fitzpatrick Dome to store large quantities of road sand/salt mixtures used to treat roads in winter when ice and snow make driving hazardous. The igloo type design was helpful in areas where snowfall would otherwise accumulate on a flat-roof structure. The dome is a 20-sided conical shell 100 feet in diameter and 50 feet in height. As it is prefabricated, larger or smaller domes can be erected simply by adding or deleting rings.

The first test structure was built in 1968 at a cost of C$17,000. The result was so successful that between 1968 and 1978, approximately 200 structures were erected in Ontario. John Fitzpatrick was granted a patent in 1972 for the invention. These structures continue to be used in Canada and internationally.

While serving at the Ministry of Transportation in Ontario in the 1970s, John Fitzpatrick devised a bubbling system used in the St. Lawrence River to prevent ice from forming in the winter. The formation of ice had hindered ferries from connecting the people of the Frontenac Islands to the mainland. The invention pumps compressed air through a network of perforated pipes at the river bottom that run between the docks and along the routes of the ferries. The bubbles hinder ice from forming which allows the ferries to function regularly in the winter.

== Death ==
Fitzpatrick died on July 9, 1989, in Toronto at the age of 82. His resting place is at the Sanctuary Park Cemetery in Toronto.
