= Mary Jolliffe =

Canadian theatre and performing arts publicist

Mary Irene Patricia Jolliffe
- Born: November 11, 1923; Chengdu, Sichuan, China
- Died: October 29, 2014 (aged 90); Toronto, Ontario, Canada
- Education: Bachelor of Arts (B.A.) in Philosophy and English
- Alma mater: University of Toronto
- Occupations: Theatre and performing arts publicist
- Parent(s): Rev. Richard Orlando Jolliffe; Selina Matilda Dunfield
- Relatives: John Jolliffe; Alice Jolliffe; Charles Jolliffe; Grace Jolliffe (wife of James Alexander Cowan); William Jolliffe
- Awards: Member of the Order of Canada, Silver Ticket Award

Mary Irene Patricia Jolliffe, C.M. (November 11, 1923 – October 29, 2014), was a Canadian theatre and performing arts publicist.

== Early life ==
Jolliffe was born in Chengdu, Sichuan, China, on November 11, 1923, and was the youngest of six children. Her parents were Methodist and later United Church of Canada missionaries.

After graduating from a Canadian missionary school in West China in 1945, Jolliffe then crossed the seas to attend the University of Toronto. By 1949, she had earned her Bachelor of Arts (B.A.) degree in English and Philosophy.

== Career ==
Following graduation from the University of Toronto, Mary returned to China, as a teacher with the United Church of Canada Overseas Mission at the Canadian School in West China. In addition to being the matron of the school, she taught Grades 5 to 8. She stayed two years before taking a high school teaching position in Welland, Ontario.

Mary Jolliffe's brother-in-law, James Alexander Cowan, was a leading Canadian public relations specialist. Cowan had been approached by Canadian theatre legend Dora Mavor Moore to assist in the creation of the Stratford Shakespeare Festival and to advise on a public relations strategy. At Cowan's urging, Jolliffe went to an interview with the Festival's general manager, Tom Patterson. She was hired. With Cowan's mentoring and her remarkable talents, Jolliffe served in the position for seven seasons. Her work was instrumental in successfully establishing the Festival's reputation in its early years.

After leaving Stratford, she went to Minnesota's Guthrie Theater. Following that, she was the advance publicist of the Metropolitan Opera touring company and later as the personal publicist for opera impresario Rudolf Bing, the powerful general manager of the Metropolitan Opera.

She went on to serve in public relations and communications positions from the inception, as well as during the ongoing operations, of such major Canadian arts activities as the Charlottetown Festival, the World Festival of Expo '67, the National Arts Centre, the Canada Council, the National Ballet of Canada, the O'Keefe Centre, the St. Lawrence Centre for the Arts in Toronto and the Ontario Arts Council.

== Honours ==
Jolliffe was appointed as a Member of the Order of Canada in 1985 and received the Silver Ticket Award in 1988.

The Mary Jolliffe Fund was established by the Ontario Arts Foundation in her honour as an arts publicist.

The 2015 production of Oedipus Rex at the Stratford Festival was dedicated to the memory of Mary Jolliffe as the Festival's first Publicity Director. When the play was first produced at Stratford in 1954, Mary Jolliffe was the publicist.

== Other ==
She was a founding member of the Performing Arts Lodge (PAL) and one of its first tenants in Toronto.
