= London Press Club =

Members' club in London, England

Coordinates: 51°30′54.35″N 0°6′25.87″W

The London Press Club was established in 1882 as a London gentlemen's club. For much of its history, it occupied premises in Wine Office Court, near Fleet Street. It still exists today, as a society for journalists, but no longer offers club facilities, which ended with its leaving Wine Office Court in 1986.

It was founded with an inaugural dinner at Anderton's Hotel, on Fleet Street, on 22 October 1882, presided over by the prominent journalist and cartoonist George Augustus Sala. The club is a founder member of the European Federation of Press Clubs. It has traditionally been considered much less formal, and even quite raucous, compared to most traditional London gentlemen's clubs – as exemplified by the club being the first to do away with a requirement for gentlemen to wear ties, in the early 1960s.

Notable members have included Lord Beaverbrook, John Jacob Astor, 1st Baron Astor of Hever, editor of the Weekly Dispatch Charles John Tibbits, artist and cartoonist Arthur Moreland and the showbusiness journalist Peter Dacre.

== See also ==
- List of London's gentlemen's clubs
- Charles Frederick Williams, founder of the London Press Club
