= William Cowan =

William Cowan may refer to:

- William Cowan (footballer) (1900–1979), English footballer
- William Cowan (football manager) (1892–1964), Scottish football manager in Spain
- William Cowan (fur trader) (1818–1902), of the Hudson's Bay Company
- William Cowan (politician) (1825–1899), reeve of North Gower Township, Ontario
- William Henry Cowan (1862–1932), Scottish politician
- W. Maxwell Cowan (William Maxwell Cowan, 1931–2002), South African neuroscientist
- Mo Cowan (William Maurice Cowan, born 1969), U.S. Senator from Massachusetts
- William Cowan (engineer) (1823–1898)
- Bill Cowan (born 1943), security expert
- Bill Cowan (tennis) (born 1959), Canadian tennis player
- Billy Cowan (born 1938), retired baseball player
- Billy Cowan (footballer) (1896–?), Scottish footballer

== See also ==
- Cowan (surname)
