= Richard Taylor (cartoonist) =

Canadian cartoonist (1902–1970)

- Born: 1902; Fort William, Ontario, Canada
- Died: 1970 (aged 67–68); Bethel, Connecticut, United States
- Other names: Ric
- Occupation: Cartoonist
- Known for: Cartoons in The New Yorker

Richard Taylor (1902–1970) was a Canadian cartoonist best known for his cartoons in the magazine The New Yorker. He also contributed to The Saturday Evening Post, Collier's, Esquire (magazine), and Playboy. He signed his work R.Taylor. An unsigned obituary in the New York Times reported that "Mr. Taylor satirized the foibles, follies and self-delusions of those who considered themselves worldly wise and self-possessed." Canadian comics historian John Bell called Taylor "one of the greatest New Yorker cartoonists".

Taylor was born in 1902 in Fort William, Ontario, in Canada. In the 1920s, he contributed to Toronto-based publications; he contributed for a year to Toronto Telegram newspaper, from 1927 to the University of Toronto's humour magazine The Goblin, and the Communist Party of Canada newspaper The Worker. Aside from cartooning, he produced commercial art and in his spare time painted. His watercolors were displayed in several museums, including the Metropolitan Museum of Art and the Museum of Modern Art. In 1935, The New Yorker began publishing his work, and he thereafter moved to the United States, where there were more opportunities for better pay for cartoonists. He married Maxine MacTavish in Toronto, Ontario and they had no children Taylor died in West Redding, Connecticut, in the United States in 1970 of prostate cancer. The National Gallery of Canada has been gifted the vast majority of his lifetime's works.

== Books ==
• The Better Taylors: An Album Of Cartoons By Richard Taylor, Richard Taylor, Random House, 1944

• Introduction to Cartooning: A Practical Instruction Book, R. Taylor, Watson-Guptill, 1947

• Fractured French, Illustrated by R. Taylor, collected by F.S. Pearson 2d, Doubleday & Company, 1950

• Compound Fractured French, Illustrated by R. Taylor, collected by F.S. Pearson 2d, Doubleday & Company, 1951

• By The Dawn’s Ugly Light: A Pictorial Study of the Hangover, by R. Taylor, Henry Holt and Company, 1953

• Fractured French, Illustrated by R. Taylor, collected by F.S. Pearson 2d, Perma Books, 1956

• R. Taylor's Wrong Bag: 95 Cartoons, Simon and Schuster, 1961

== Works cited ==
- Bell, John (2006). Invaders from the North: How Canada Conquered the Comic Book Universe. Toronto: Dundurn Press. ISBN 978-1-55002-659-7.
- Current Biography staff (1941). "Richard Thompson". Current Biography. H. W. Wilson Company. p. 854.
- Lerner, Loren R.; Williamson, Mary F. (1991). Art and architecture in Canada: a bibliography and guide to the literature to 1981. University of Toronto Press. ISBN 978-0-8020-5856-0.
- Mouly, Françoise; Weschler, Lawrence (2000). Covering the New Yorker: cutting-edge covers from a literary institution. Abbeville Press. ISBN 9780789206572.
