= Thomas Cowan =

Thomas Cowan may refer to:

- Tam Cowan (born 1969), Scottish media personality
- Thomas Cowan (South Australian politician) (1839–1890), South Australian politician
- Thomas F. Cowan (1927–2010), American politician from New Jersey
- Tom Cowan (born 1969), Scottish footballer
- Tom Cowan (director) (born 1942), Australian filmmaker
- Thomas William Cowan (1840–1926), British beekeeper
- Thomas Cowan (broadcaster) (1884–1969), radio announcer
- Thomas Cowan (alternative medicine practitioner), a conspirationist and former medical doctor
- Thomas Cowan (Minnesota politician) (1821-1863), American politician from Minnesota
- Thomas Cowan (runner) (born 2005), New Zealand middle-distance runner

== See also ==
- Cowan (surname)
