= Cowen =

Cowen may refer to:

- Cowen (surname)
- Cowen, West Virginia, in the United States
- Cowen Group, the holding company for Cowen and Company, LLC, a U.S.-based Investment Bank

== See also ==
- Cowan (disambiguation)
