= Andrew Cowan (disambiguation) =

Andrew Cowan (1936–2019) was a Scottish rally driver

Andrew Cowan or Andy Cowan may also refer to:

- Andrew Cowan (soldier) (1841–1919), American soldier
- Andrew Cowan (writer) (born 1960), English writer
- Andy Cowan, American writer and script consultant
- Andy Cowan (musician) (born 1952), Australian musician
