= Bentinck Township, Ontario =

Coordinates: 44.222°N 80.947°W

Bentinck was a township of Grey County, Ontario, Canada from 1850 to 2000. In 2000 it ceased to formally exist as it was amalgamated with other municipalities into the Township of West Grey. Although it is no longer formally a township, local sideroads and concessions (and thus, local addresses) are still all named after the defunct township.
