= Harry Cowan =

Scottish footballer (1893–1974)

Personal information
- Full name: Henry Cowan
- Date of birth: 5 December 1893
- Place of birth: Rutherglen, Scotland (Note: Cowan was raised in Eastfield, a small community in Lanarkshire situated between Cambuslang and Rutherglen (nowadays a suburb connecting them), with both towns being quoted as his hometown in sources as a result.)
- Date of death: c. 1974 (aged 80–81)
- Place of death: United States
- Positions: Full back; centre half

Senior career*
Years	Team	Apps	(Gls)
1916–1924	Clyde	265	(3)
1924–1925	Dunfermline Athletic	35	(0)
1925–1927	New Bedford Whalers	76	(1)
1927	Hartford Americans	9	(0)
1927	New York Nationals	3	(0)
1928	Fall River	4	(0)
1928–1929	Pawtucket Rangers	5	(0)
1929–1931	New Bedford Whalers	8	(0)
Total		405	(4)
- * Club domestic league appearances and goals

Henry Cowan (5 December 1893 – 1974) was a Scottish footballer who played for Clyde and Dunfermline Athletic in his native country and for several clubs – primarily the New Bedford Whalers – in the United States, mainly as a full back. Reports from the time indicate that he was deaf and/or mute.

== Career ==
=== Scotland ===
Raised in Eastfield, South Lanarkshire, Cowan began his known senior career with local club Clyde in 1916 (he was around 22 years old and it is likely he played for other clubs earlier, but this is unconfirmed). He was ever-present in his first season at Shawfield Stadium – 38 league appearances – and continued to feature regularly for the club throughout the duration of World War I (when many competitions were suspended but the Scottish Football League continued for public morale), suggesting that he was employed in a reserved occupation in addition to being a sportsman, although his later marriage and travel documentation listed him as a dyer outwith football so it may have been his hearing impairment which excused him from active service. A match report from October 1918 stated that Cowan "was again a dominating personality at pivot" in a victory over Hearts.

His eight years at Clyde also included reaching three finals of the Glasgow Cup, all ending in defeat (twice losing out to Celtic and once to Rangers after a replay, in which Cowan conceded a penalty kick for handball which resulted in the only goal). His spell at the club ended at the same time as their relegation from the top division in 1923–24, ending an 18-year run in the top division. A benefit match was played for him against Rangers in March 1924 to recognise his long service.

=== United States ===
Cowan moved on to Dunfermline Athletic for one season before heading to the United States, aged 31, to play in the American Soccer League. (Note: Although by no means a new development, the timing of his departure coincided almost exactly with the Scottish Football Association hierarchy meeting to discuss the "American menace", as they described the exodus of players crossing the Atlantic for a new challenge with attractive wages, in many cases circumventing the 'retain or transfer' system in Britain by which a club could hold on to registered players whom they did not intend to utilise until another club paid a nominated transfer fee, without having to pay them; however this was only applicable to the Scottish and English leagues, and moving abroad (Ireland was also a popular choice) was at times the only career continuation option available to out-of-favour players with a high transfer price and no bidders for their services.)

Initially he was with the New Bedford Whalers, playing regularly for two seasons and winning the Lewis Cup in 1926. He then had short spells with other clubs: he began 1927–28 with the Hartford Americans before they were withdrawn from the league, then played a few matches each for the New York Nationals and the Fall River – he was not involved in the later stages of the Nationals' winning run in the 1928 National Challenge Cup. In 1928–29 he played for J. & P. Coats who changed identity mid-season to become the Pawtucket Rangers. By now at the veteran stage, he returned to the Whalers in 1929 and played a handful of games for them, likely as an emergency stand-in, over the next two seasons, a somewhat chaotic period known as the 'soccer wars', featuring several disputes, teams resigning and rival leagues being created, coinciding with the Great Depression which brought about the end of the system altogether a few years later.

== Personal life ==
His son of the same name was born in Scotland but grew up in New Bedford and became an American citizen in order to serve in the US Air Force during World War II; he was killed in action in 1944.
