= Cathy A. Cowan =

Economist

Cathy A. Cowan, an economist, works for the National Health Statistics Group with the Office of the Actuary at the Centers for Medicare & Medicaid Services (CMS). For 25 years, she investigated the historical state-based and national estimations of capital spent on health care within the United States. Cowan specializes in health financing, private health insurance, out of pocket spending and the health costs of businesses, households and the government. Similarly, she enjoys looking into comparing the health expenditure data with the household surveys along with international comparisons. Her education was expanded upon with a bachelor's degree in business at Indiana University Bloomington and a master's degree in the University of South Carolina. In one particular study, Cathy A. Cowan, who was working as a business analyst at Health Care Financing Administration, concluded that the government and businesses each paid about a third of health care costs throughout the 1980s, along with an equal share from patients. During a news conference, the economist claimed that the national growth of health-care spending was slightly faster in 2006 than 2005 due to a 6.7 percent increase from a 6.5 percent growth. In fact, in 2006, expenditures reached $2.1 trillion, which is similar to $7000 a person in the United States. As a part of the World Health Organization, she was selected as the chair of the Global Health Expenditure Database's Technical Advisory Group. Cowan's fame was expanded when she was recognized as one of the world's most influential scientific minds. Some of her well known works include “National Health Expenditures, "Business, Households and Government: Health Care Spending", "Burden of Health Care Costs", "Reconciling Medical Expenditure Estimates from the MEPS and NHE”, and “Out-of-pocket health care expenditures, by insurance status, 2007-10".

== Selected works ==
- Levit, Katherine; Lazenby, Helen; Cowan, Cathy; Letsch, Suzanne (1996). "National Health Expenditures". Health Care Financing Review. 13 (1). Washington, D.C.: Dept. of Health, Education, and Welfare, Health Care Financing Administration: 29–54. PMC 4193227. PMID 10114934.
- Cowan, Cathy A; Braden, Bradley R; McDonnell, Patricia A; Sivarajan, Lekha (1996). "Data View: Business, Households, and Government: Health Spending, 1994". Health Care Financing Review. 17 (4). Washington, D.C: Dept. of Health, Education, and Welfare, Health Care Financing Administration: 157.
- Cowan, Cathy A; Braden, Bradley R (1997). "Business, Households, and Government: Health Care Spending, 1995". Health Care Financing Review. 18 (3). Washington, D.C.: Dept. of Health, Education, and Welfare, Health Care Financing Administration: 195–206. PMC 4194499. PMID 10170349.
- Cowan, Cathy A; McDonnell, Patricia A; Levit, Katharine R; Zezzal, Mark A (2002). "Burden of Health Care Costs: Businesses, Households, and Governments, 1987-2000". Health Care Financing Review. 23 (3). Washington, D.C.: Department of Health, Education, and Welfare, Health Care Financing Administration: 131–59. PMC 4194768. PMID 12500353.
- Sing, Merrile; Banthin, Jessica S.; Selden, Thomas M.; Cowan, Cathy A.; Keehan, Sean P. A. (2006). "Reconciling Medical Expenditure Estimates from the MEPS and NHEA, 2002". 28 (1). Washington, D.C: Dept. of Health, Education, and Welfare, Health Care Financing Administration: 25–40.
- Catlin, MK; Poisal, JA; Cowan, CA (January 2015). "Out-of-pocket health care expenditures, by insurance status, 2007-10". Health Affairs. 34 (1). Bethesda, Maryland: Millwood: 1111–1116. doi:10.1377/hlthaff.2014.0422. PMID 25561651.
