= Charles Frederick Williams =

Scottish-Irish writer, journalist and war correspondent

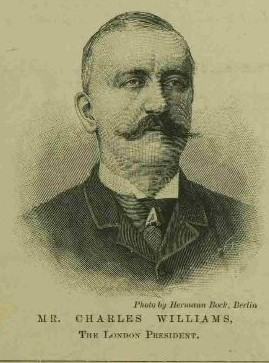
- Portrait of Charles Frederick Williams, London President, The Institute of Journalists, from The Illustrated London News, 30 September 1893 issue.
- Born: Charles Frederick Williams; 4 May 1838; Coleraine, Ireland
- Died: 9 February 1904 (aged 65); Brixton, London, England, United Kingdom
- Education: Belfast Academy
- Occupations: Writer, journalist, war correspondent
- Known for: Former President and Founder of the London Press Club, Former Chairman of the London District of the Institute of Journalists
- Notable work: The Armenian Campaign: A Diary of the Campaign on 1877, in Armenia and Koordistan; Notes on the Operations in Lower Afghanistan, 1878–9, with Special Reference to Transport
- Spouse: Georgina Gould Ward
- Children: Frederick George Hilary Williams; Francis Austin Ward Williams
- Relatives: Joan Alisten Meuser (great granddaughter), Lois Ann Fairley (great granddaughter), and James Douglas Cowan (great grandson)

Charles Frederick Williams (4 May 1838 – 9 February 1904) was a Scottish-Irish writer, journalist, and war correspondent.

== Early life ==
Charles Williams was born on 4 May 1838 in Coleraine, Ireland. He claimed to be descended on his father's side from Worcestershire yeomen living in the parishes of Tenbury and Mamble. On his mother's side he descended from Scottish settlers who planted Ulster in 1610. Williams was educated at Belfast Academy in Belfast under Dr. Reuben John Bryce and at a Greenwich private school under Dr. Goodwin. Later on, he went to Southern United States for his health and took part in a filibustering expedition to Nicaragua, where he saw some hard fighting and reportedly won the reputation of a blockade-runner. Williams was separated from his party and was lost in the forest for six days. Fevered, he discovered a small boat and managed to return to the nearest British settlement. He served in the London Irish Rifles and had the rank of Sergeant.

== Career ==
=== Journalist and war correspondent ===
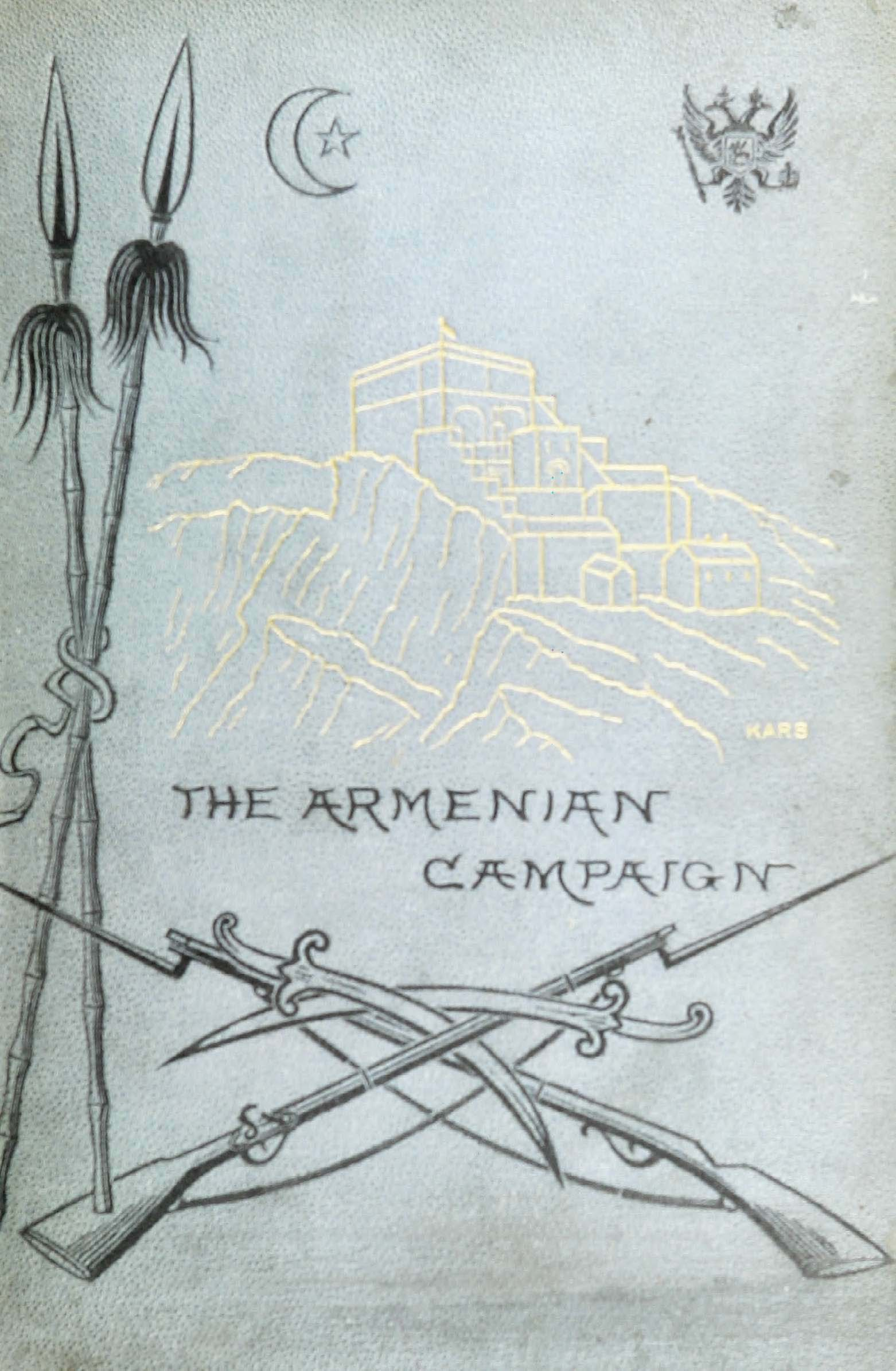
Book cover of The Armenian Campaign: A Diary of the Campaign of 1877, in Armenia and Koordistan.

He returned to England in 1859, where he became a volunteer, and a leader writer for the London Evening Herald. In October 1859, he had begun a connection with The Standard which had lasted until 1884. From 1860 until 1863, he worked as a first editor for the London Evening Standard; and from 1882 until 1884, as editor of The Evening News.

Williams was best known for being a war correspondent. He was described as an admirable war correspondent, a daring rider as well as writer. For The Standard, he was at the headquarters of the Armée de la Loire, a French army, during the Franco-Prussian War in 1870. He was also one of the first correspondents in Strasbourg, where the French forces were defeated. In the summer and autumn of 1877, he was a correspondent to Ahmed Muhtar Pasha who commanded the Turkish forces in Armenia during the Russo-Turkish War of 1877 and 1878. Williams remained constantly at the Turkish front, and his letters were the only continuous series that reached England. In 1878, he published this series in a revised and extended form as The Armenian Campaign: A Diary of the Campaign on 1877, in Armenia and Koordistan, which was a large accurate record of the war, even though it was pro-Turkish. From Armenia, he followed Muhtar Pasha to European Turkey and described his defence of the lines of Constantinople against the Imperial Russian Army. Williams was with General Mikhail Skobelev at the headquarters of the Imperial Russian Army when the Treaty of San Stefano was signed in March 1878. He reported this at the Berlin Congress.

At the end of 1878, he was in Afghanistan reporting the war, and in 1879 published the Notes on the Operations in Lower Afghanistan, 1878–9, with Special Reference to Transport.

In the autumn of 1884, representing the Central News Agency of London, Williams also joined the Gordon Relief Expedition, a British mission to relieve in Major-General Charles George Gordon in Khartoum, Sudan. His was the first dispatch to tell of the loss of Gordon. While in Sudan, he quarrelled with Henry H. S. Pearse of The Daily News, who later unsuccessfully sued him. After leaving The Standard in 1884, he worked with the Morning Advertiser, but later worked with the Daily Chronicle as a war correspondent. He was the only British correspondent to be with the Bulgarian Army under Prince Alexander Joseph of Battenberg during the Serbo-Bulgarian War in November 1885. In the Greco-Turkish War of 1897, he was attached to the Greek forces in Thessaly. His last war reporting was on Herbert Kitchener's Sudanese campaign of 1898. His health did not permit his advance to South Africa, but he was still able to London a diary of the South African War for The Morning Leader.

In 1887, Williams met with then United States General of the Army, General Philip Sheridan in Washington, D.C. to update the general on European affairs and the prospects of upcoming conflicts.

=== Politics ===
He once tried to bid once as a Conservative Party candidate for the House of Commons representative of Leeds West, a borough in Leeds, West Yorkshire, during the 1885 General Election. He was failed to win the seat against Liberal candidate Herbert Gladstone. He once served as the Chairman of the London district of the Institute of Journalists from 1893 to 1894. He founded the London Press Club where he also served as its president from 1896 to 1897.

=== Military service ===
Williams was wounded three times in action. He was shot in the leg in Egypt in 1885 during General Buller's retreat from Gubat to Korti.

Williams was a member of the 1st Surrey Rifles, a volunteer unit of the British Army; a member of the London Irish Volunteers; and was a known marksman.

=== Lectures ===
Williams is said to have possessed a voice of thunder and expressed with terrific energy. He conducted a lecture tour of the United States where he described the six campaigns, illustrated by limelight photographs. His audience in Brooklyn, New York was described by The New York Times as highly delighted by his lecture about the hardships and adventures. His presentation was "a feast for the eyes and ears and was highly appreciated by the large audience assembled." He later toured England, Scotland, and Ireland speaking about his then seven campaigns.

=== African expeditions ===
A friend of explorer Henry Morton Stanley, Williams gave him a compass that had been on a number of his expeditions. Stanley took it with him to Africa and it now is on display at the Royal Museum of Central Africa in Belgium.

=== Author ===
Williams also wrote fiction, including his book "John Thaddeus Mackay," a tale about religious tolerance and understanding. With the sanction of Commander in Chief, Field Marshal Viscount Wolseley, Williams edited a book "Songs for Soldiers for the March The Camp and the Barracks" to improve morale and relieve boredom. Included in the book are a number of songs that he composed. He also wrote about ecclesiastical questions, and contributed articles and stories to different periodicals.

Williams was a strong adherent to Garnet Wolseley's military views and policy, and had considerable military knowledge. He had also published military subjects in several publications such as the United Service Magazine, the National Review, and other periodicals. In 1892, he published Life of Sir H. Evelyn Wood, which was controversial as he defended the actions of Wood after the Battle of Majuba Hill in 1881. In 1902, he published a pamphlet, entitled Hush Up, in which he protested against the proposed limited official inquiry to the South African War and called for an investigation.

=== Others ===
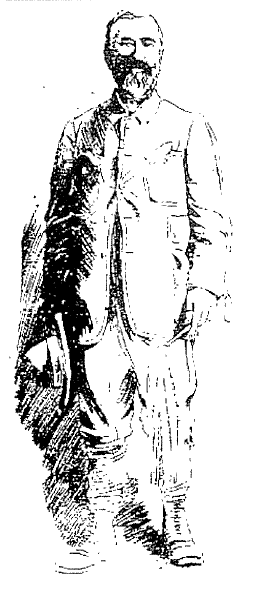
A sketch of Charles Frederick Williams.

Early in his career, Charles Williams shared an office with friend and colleague Robert Gascoyne-Cecil, who would later become Lord Salisbury, Prime Minister of Great Britain. They had a standing tradition of always sending out for two beers with payment alternating between each man. Many years later, Williams was in the lobby of the House of Lords. Lord Salisbury approached him with outstretched hand and asked, "By the way, Mr. Williams, whose turn is it to stand the beer?"

In 1884, the steamer carrying Williams and colleague Frederic Villiers of The Graphic overturned in the Nile River. Their rescue led Williams to later commission a unique ivory and gold mitre for the Bishop of London as a thank-offering to God for his safe return from Khartoum.

In Rudyard Kipling's play, The Light that Failed, the character of Mr. Nilghai, the war correspondent, was based on Charles Williams.

Williams received a personal invitation from King Edward VII to attend the funeral of his mother, Queen Victoria.

Both of Williams' sons became journalists. Frederick was a noted parliamentary reporter, writer, and historian in Canada. Francis Austin Ward Williams practiced journalism in Sydney, Australia.

== Published works ==
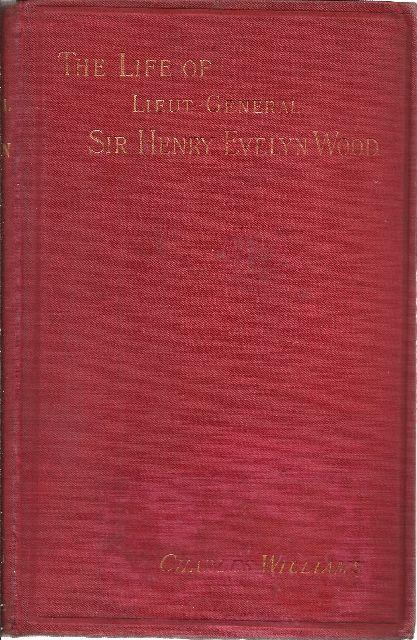
Book cover of The Life of Sir Lieut-General Evelyn Wood by Charles Williams.

The following are the publications of Charles Frederick Williams:

- The Armenian Campaign: A Diary of the Campaign of 1877, in Armenia and Koordistan (1877)
- Notes on the Operations in Lower Afghanistan, 1878-9, with Special References to Transport (1879)
- John Thaddeus Mackay (1889)
- "How We Lost Gordon" (Fortnightly Review, May 1895)
- The Thessalian Campaign (1897)
- The Life of Sir Lieut-General Evelyn Wood
- England's Defences
- Songs for Soldiers
- Army Reform
- Hushed Up, a Criticism on the South African Campaign
- Numerous articles in the United Services Magazine and other publications

== Recognition ==
In the Nile Campaign of 1884 until 1885 application was made to the War Office with the support of the Commander in Chief Lord Wolseley for medals for Willams and correspondent Bennet Burleigh. Williams had been twice requested to take command of some of the men by senior officers on the spot. The Secretary of War was unable to grant the recognition under the rules of the day but wrote a letter saying that he regretted that this must be his decision.

Williams was a recipient of the Queen's Sudan Medal, an award given to British and Egyptian forces which took part in the Sudan campaign between 1896 and 1898.

Field Marshal Garnet Wolseley recognized the contributions of Charles Williams on the battlefield. Wolesely said in a speech that from "Charles Williams, he had at various times received the greatest possible help in the field."

== Death ==
Charles Williams died in Brixton, London on 9 February 1904; he was buried in Nunhead Cemetery of London. His son, journalist Fred Williams, first learned of his father's death on the wire service he was monitoring at his newspaper in Toronto, Ontario, Canada.

His funeral was well attended by the press as well as members of the military including Field Marshal Sir Evelyn Wood. Colleague Henry Nevison wrote a long reflection on Charles Williams. It included, "On the field he possessed a kind of instinctive sense of what was going to happen. When I went to big field-days with him he was already an elderly man, and much broken down with the hardships of a war correspondent's life; but he invariably appeared at the critical place exactly at the right moment, and I once heard the Duke of Connaught, who was commanding, say, 'When I see Charlie Williams shut up his telescope, I know it's all over.'... "And now he is gone, with his rage, his generosity, his innocent pride, his faithful championship of every friend, and his memories of so many a strange event. His greatest joy was to encourage youth to follow in his steps, and the world is sadder and duller for his going."

== See also ==
- Garnet Wolseley, 1st Viscount Wolseley
- Nile Expedition
- London Evening Standard
- Greco-Turkish War (1897)
