= The Goblin (magazine) =

Canadian comedic magazine

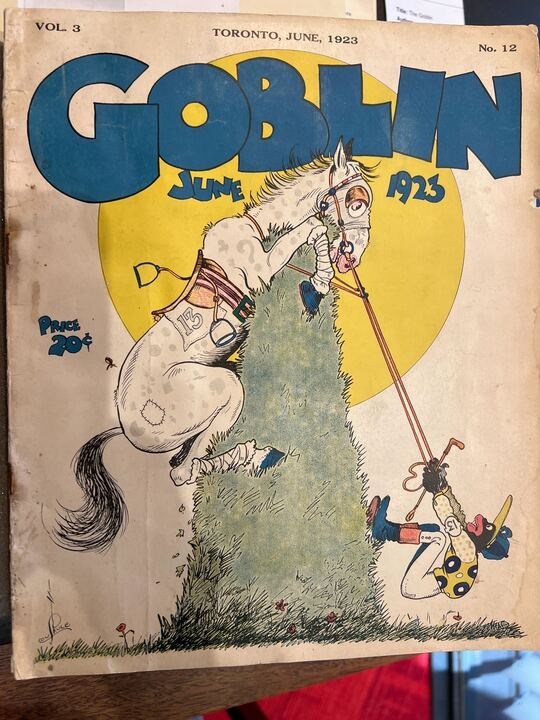
- The Cover of the June 1923 issue of The Goblin, a Canadian Humorous Magazine.
- Country: Canada
- Province: Ontario
- City: Toronto
- Publication Type: Monthly (Every Month)
- OCLC: OCLC 231859789

The Goblin was a Canadian humour magazine based in Toronto, Ontario. It was self-published from February of 1921 to May of 1929, and was originally started by students of the University of Toronto, although had no connection with University anymore by 1928.

It primarily contained satire, caricature, and literary criticism, as well as various art from individuals such as Lou Skuce, Jimmy Frise, Lawson Wood, Jack Maclaren, Russ Fisher, Walter Schmidt, and Syd Law, with other contributions by James Alexander Cowan (the first editor-in-chief) and Stephen Leacock.

The magazine's initial price was 20 cents, but in 1925 its price was increased to 25 cents for the remainder of its publication. The magazine ran until volume 9, issue 9, after which it was replaced with The New Goblin.
