= Cowans Brook =

Stream in Minnesota, U.S.

Coordinates: 46°14′45″N 93°12′36″W

Cowans Brook is a stream in Aitkin and Kanabec counties, Minnesota, in the United States. Cowans Brook was named for a lumberjack.

== See also ==
- List of rivers of Minnesota
