= Frances Shelley Wees =

American-Canadian educator and writer

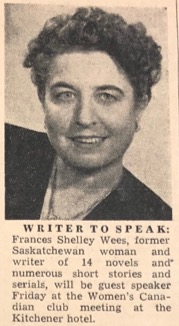
- Frances Shelley Wees from Saskatchewan, shares her story at the Regina Women's Canadian Club at the Kitchener Hotel.
- Born: April 29, 1902; Gresham, Oregon
- Died: November 27, 1982 (aged 80)
- Education: University of Alberta
- Occupation: Writer
- Spouse: Wilfred Rusk Wees

Frances Shelley Wees (April 29, 1902 – November 27, 1982) was an American-Canadian educator and writer.

== Life ==
Wees was born in Gresham, Oregon and later moved to Saskatoon where she attended normal school. She began teaching when she was seventeen. Wees received a BA from the University of Alberta; during this time, she wrote her first novel which remained unpublished.

Having always been a writer, one of Wees' early manuscripts was found by her husband who later typed it and sent it to a New York publisher. This novel ended up selling 50,316 copies. She went on to write more than two dozen mystery and romance novels including The Maestro Murders in 1931. She also published readers for primary school and contributed serial fiction, poems and articles to various publications.

Wees was a director for Chautauquas in Canada for approximately 8 years during the 1920s. During the 1930s, she worked in public relations in Toronto. During World War II, she led the national clothing drive for the United Nations Relief and Rehabilitation Administration.

She also published readers for primary school and contributed serial fiction, poems and articles to various publications. One of the recurring characters in her novels was psychologist Dr. Jonathan Merrill. Merrill would aid the police in solving the crime. The character was based on her friend and public relations pioneer, James Alexander Cowan.

== Family ==
In 1924, she married Wilfred Rusk Wees; the couple had two children, Margarita and Timothy. In 1933, the couple moved to Toronto where Dr. Wees began studying psychology at the University of Toronto; he later accepted a teaching position at the university. The family owned two homes whilst living in Toronto, one in the city and one 35 miles out. During the war, Dr. Wees became head of the personnel selection for the Canadian Army overseas and later became director of training for Veteran's Affairs.

She spent 30 years in Stouffville, Ontario before moving to Denman Island in British Columbia in 1981. Wees died there at the age of 80.
