= North West Canada Medal =

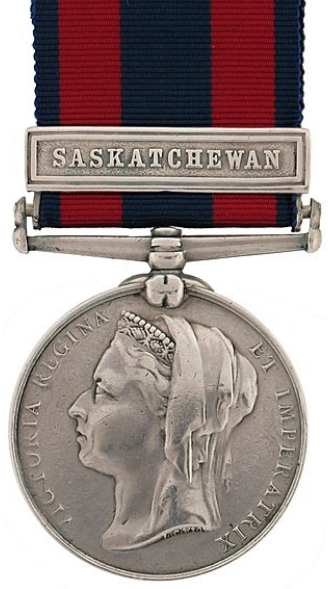
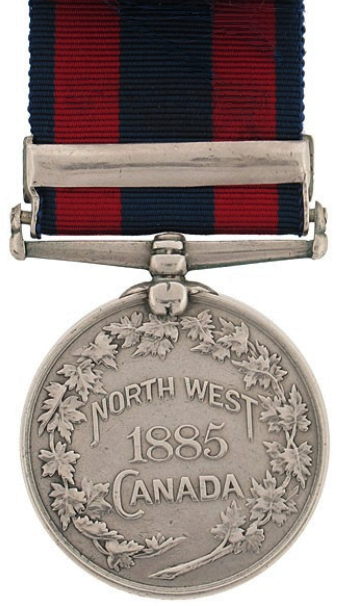
- Obverse and reverse of the medal
- Type: Campaign medal
- Country: Canada
- Presented by: Queen Victoria
- Eligibility: Canadian local forces, attached British Army officers and members of the North-West Mounted Police
- Campaign: North-West Rebellion
- Clasps: Saskatchewan
- Established: 18 September 1885

Highlights
- Total: 5,650
- Ribbon bar of the medal

The North West Canada Medal is a British campaign medal issued to the soldiers, volunteers, and North-West Mounted Police (NWMP) personnel who participated in putting down the North-West Rebellion in 1885.

== Eligibility ==
The medal was established by the Canadian government in September 1885 after consultation between the governor general of Canada and the British secretary of state for the colonies.

It was awarded to those who took part in the suppression of the North-West Rebellion of 1885 and who served west of Port Arthur, Ontario. Recipients included a number of volunteers, including the crew of the steamer Northcote for service at the Battle of Batoche, and members of the Prince Albert Volunteers for service at the Battle of Duck Lake. Initially, members of the NWMP were not eligible. However, a Canadian order in council of 13 December 1886 recommended that the NWMP receive the medal, this being accepted by the British government on 16 February 1887. A total of 920 medals were then awarded to the NWMP.

No British Army units took part, although seventeen British Army officers were attached to Canadian units.

All those who received the medal, except for members of the NWMP, also received a grant of 320 acres (130 ha) of land, or scrip of $80 in lieu. During the 1930s, surviving NWMP recipients were each granted $300.

== Appearance ==
The medal is a circular, silver and 1 7/16 inches (37 mm) in diameter. The obverse, designed by Leonard Charles Wyon, bears an effigy of Queen Victoria, facing left and wearing a diadem and veil. Around the edge is the inscription "Victoria Regina et Imperatrix" (Latin for 'Victoria Queen and Empress'). The reverse, designed by Thomas Brock, has the inscription "North West 1885 Canada" in three lines surrounded by a wreath of maple leaves.

The medal is suspended from a ribbon in slate grey 1 1/4 inches (32 mm) wide, with crimson 1/4-inch (6 mm) stripes, 1/8 inch (3 mm) from each edge.

The clasp "Saskatchewan" was awarded to those present at any of the four main encounters during the rebellion; Fish Creek, Batoche, Cut Knife, and Frenchman's Butte. Approximately 1,760 medals were awarded with the clasp. A number of veterans of the Battle of Batoche added an unofficial "Batoche" clasp to their medal.

Medals were issued unnamed, although many recipients had their name and unit engraved on the rim.
