= Hôtel-Dieu Grace Healthcare =

Coordinates: 42.28541°N 83.06374°W

- Erie St. Clair LHIN
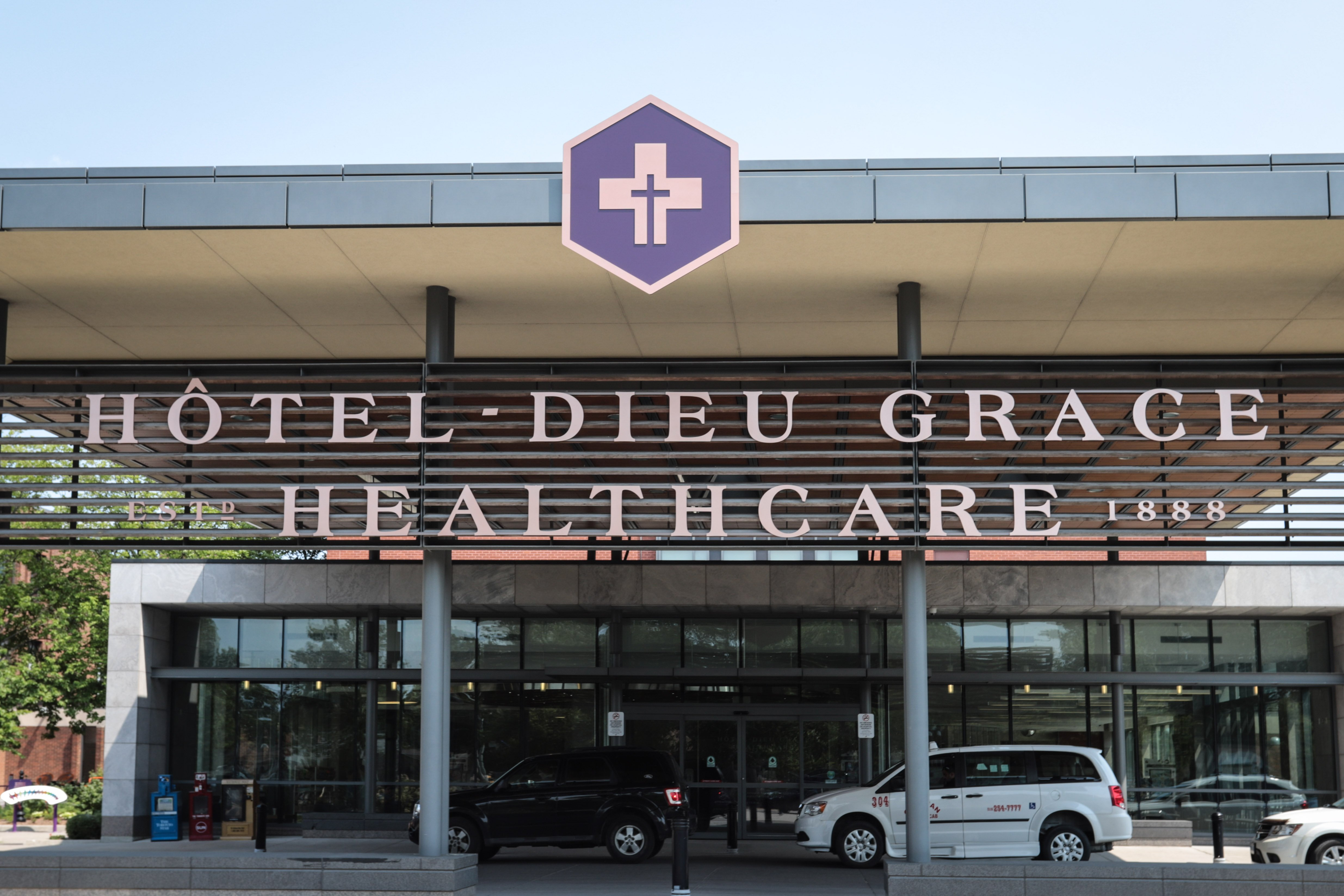

Geography
- Location: 1453 Prince Rd; Windsor, Ontario; N9C 3Z4 Canada

Organisation
- Care system: Medicare
- Type: Post-Acute and Mental Health

Services
- Emergency department: no
- Beds: 313

History
- Founded: 1888

Links
- Website: www.hdgh.org

Hôtel-Dieu Grace Healthcare is a 313-bed regional provider of post-acute care services in Windsor-Essex. This includes all programs and services at the Prince Road campus such as complex care, palliative care, regional rehabilitation, cardiac wellness, bariatric services, specialized mental health and addictions, and children's mental health.

== History ==
The Hôtel-Dieu Grace Hospital was created by an agreement between two hospitals to share services. In 1991, the CEOs of the hospitals began meeting to discuss the options. An agreement was signed two years later on December 1, 1993, and after about three years of discussions and planning, the alliance went into effect as of April 1, 1994.

=== Hôtel-Dieu of St. Joseph Hospital ===
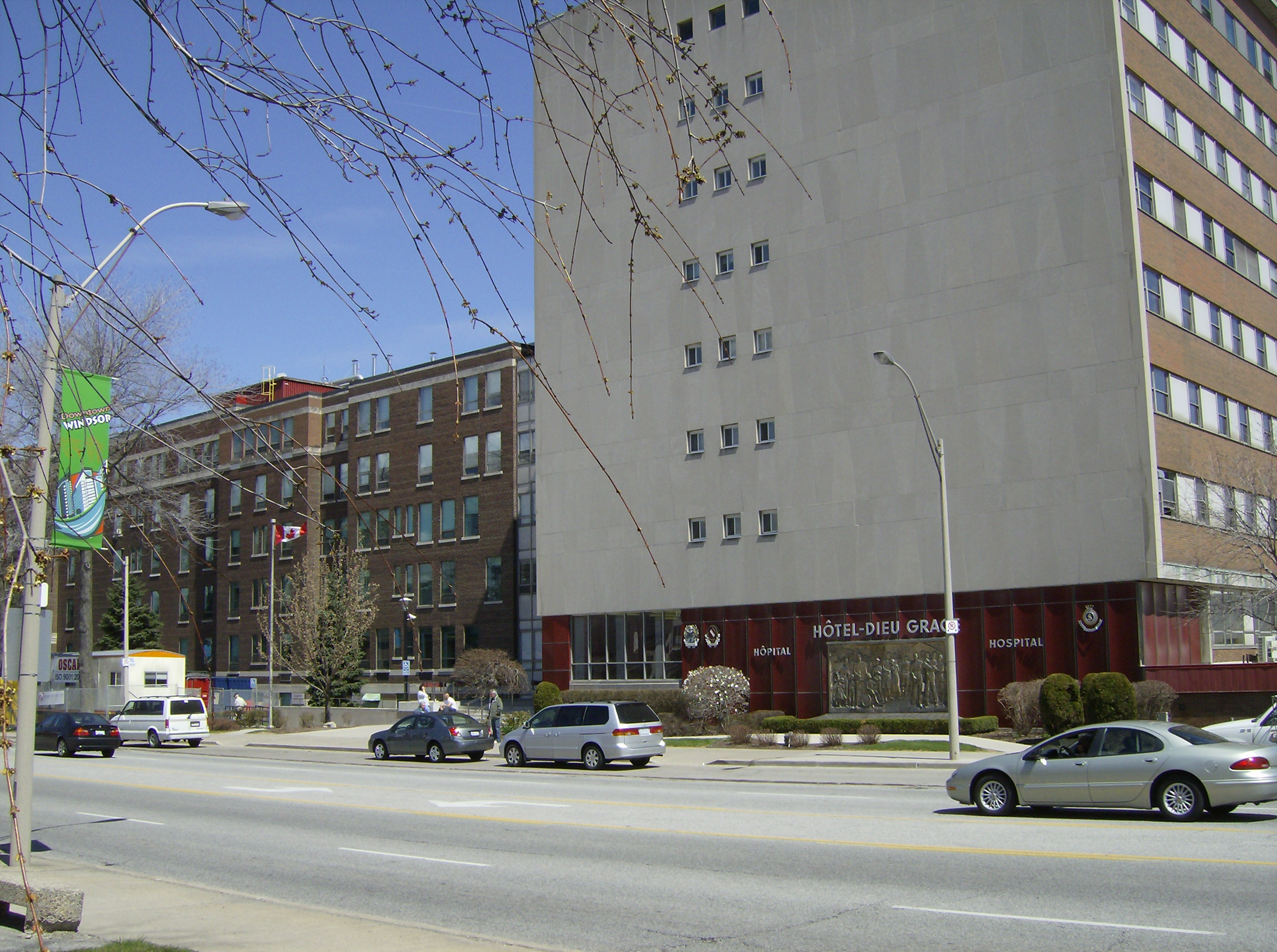
Hôtel-Dieu Grace Hospital in downtown Windsor

Hôtel-Dieu of St. Joseph Hospital is the oldest hospital in Windsor, Ontario. It was founded in 1888 by Dean James Theodore Wagner, pastor of St. Alphonsus Parish, and five sisters from the Religious Hospitallers of St. Joseph (RHSJ), who came from Hôtel-Dieu de Montréal on September 14, 1888.

Dean J.T. Wagner had become concerned for the black people who had migrated from the southern United States to his parish, particularly the children in the community. The families had come from the rural American South for the industrial jobs. The children were excluded from white schools and had no school of their own. In addition, many had become orphans. Dean J.T. Wagner organized a mission for black people and sent letters asking for donations.

One of these letters reached Mother Bonneau, the R.H.S.J. Superior in Montréal. She was so moved that she sent Wagner $2.50 (equivalent to $94 in 2025) and wrote that if he were considering building a hospital in Windsor, her order would be happy to help.

Construction on the hospital began on October 10, 1888; it was officially blessed October 15, 1889 and was completed February 1890. The original 1888 building was a three-story brick building built in the Norman architecture style with three turrets. An orphanage and school for black children was also opened on the site in 1890 and was run by the RHSJ. After four years, the school was discontinued because of low enrollment.

Over the years Hôtel-Dieu of St. Joseph Hospital was renovated and expanded several times, adding more beds as the need arose. Additional beds were added in 1910, 1927, 1938, 1952, and 1962. In 1963 the original 1888 building was demolished.

=== Salvation Army Grace Hospital ===
Windsor's second hospital was created in 1918 when the Salvation Army converted the former Ellis home at Crawford and London Street to fill the need for more hospital beds in Windsor. The Grace Hospital was originally supposed to be a maternity hospital, like others the Salvation Army had founded in Canada. The need for a second general hospital was so great that the plans were changed.

The original building (the former Ellis home) had a capacity for only 28 beds, by 1922 the hospital added a second wing to increase the capacity to 122 beds. Over the years, other wings were built, including a South Wing (1942) and a North Wing (1945). After a fire destroyed a large portion of the hospital on June 6, 1960, approval was obtained to build a new five-story high, air-conditioned wing, which was officially opened in September 1966. After this wing was built, all that remained of the original Ellis home was its central door.

An additional expansion and renovation project was approved in February 1980. The West Wing was officially opened in March 1985. The Grace site was officially closed February 1, 2004, and demolition of the Grace Hospital buildings began in March 2013 following removal of asbestos.

=== Realignment of Hospital Services ===
In October 2013, Hôtel-Dieu Grace Hospital and Windsor Regional Hospital realigned hospital services within the City of Windsor. Hôtel-Dieu Grace Hospital took over operations of Windsor Regional Hospital's Tayfour Campus on Prince Road and Windsor Regional Hospital took over operations of Hôtel-Dieu Grace Hospital's downtown location on Ouellette Ave. Windsor Regional Hospital's Metropolitan Campus on Tecumseh Road was unaffected.

Hôtel-Dieu Grace Hospital was renamed Hôtel-Dieu Grace Healthcare.
