= James Alexander Cowan =

Canadian writer and public relations consultant

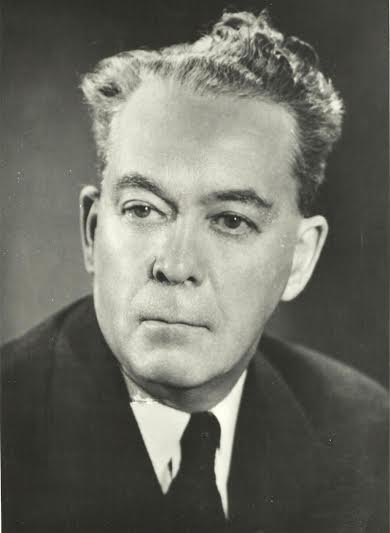
- Born: October 27, 1901; Shakespeare, Ontario, Canada
- Died: September 9, 1978 (aged 76); Bracebridge, Ontario, Canada
- Resting place: Gravenhurst, Ontario, Canada
- Other names: Jimmy Cowan, Jamie Cowan, JAC
- Education: University of Toronto
- Spouses: Grace Williams (m. 1924 – w. 1940); Grace Jolliffe (m. 1941 – d. 1963); Mary Welsman (m. 1963 – 1988)
- Children: Joan Alisten Meuser; Lois Ann Fairley; James Douglas Cowan; Catherine Lee Bailey
- Parent(s): Hugh Cowan; Jean Eloise Wood

James Alexander Cowan (October 27, 1901 – September 9, 1978) was a Canadian writer and a public relations consultant.

== Background ==
James Alexander Cowan was born in Shakespeare, Ontario, Canada on October 27, 1901, to Rev. Hugh Cowan and Jean Eloise Wood.

He attended the University of Toronto.

He was employed at the Toronto Star, where he made friends with Ernest Hemingway.

Cowan married Grace Fenwick Williams, daughter of Frederick George Hilary Williams and granddaughter of Charles Frederick Williams. (They later divorced.) The wedding took place on January 12, 1924, at Ernest Hemingway's Cedarville Mansions in Toronto. Hemingway also served as Cowan's best man and the host of the wedding. Hemingway is noted to be one of Cowan's close friends at Toronto Star. Hemingway gave Cowan a copy of his first published book entitled Three Stories and Ten Poems. The gift by Hemingway was a first edition from a printing of 300. It includes a signature by Ernest Hemingway and Hemingway's personal inscription for Cowan; the inscription reads as follows:

"This book is the property of James Cowan—he is not responsible for it—nor did he buy it. It was presented to him by the author."

— Ernest Hemingway, Three Stories and Ten Poems (1923)

Cowan's copy of the book is sufficiently valuable to be currently priced at a hundred twenty-five thousand US dollars.

Cowan had many jobs before becoming a writer and public relations consultant. During World War I, he worked stevedoring and as a guard at an arms plant. He also was an advance man for a vaudeville troupe called The Dumbbells who toured Canada and the United States.

In 1941, Cowan married Grace Jolliffe. They divorced in 1963. In 1963, he married Mary Welsman, daughter of Canadian conductor and musician Frank Welsman.

== Career ==
=== Writer ===
James A. Cowan was one of the founding members of The Goblin in 1921. He was its first editor-in-chief. The magazine was the best-selling magazine in Canada during its publication. With its success, many writers contributed to the magazine including Stephen Leacock, Gregory Clark, Nunnaly Johnson, Bruce Hutchison, and Leslie McFarlane, the original author of The Hardy Boys. The Goblin ceased publication after its Volume 9 no. 9 issue and was continued by The New Goblin.

Cowan worked as a feature writer and editor at the Toronto Star in his early 20s. He also wrote feature articles for Maclean's magazine, a newsweekly news magazine, reporting on Canadian politics, pop culture, and current events, and writing commentaries. One notable commentary was about the state of Canadian national cinema. He also contributed to The Canadian Magazine. After Maclean's magazine, he wrote satires for Esquire.

Prior to the outbreak of war between Japan and the U.S. in 1941, Cowan was approached by the Japanese government to produce a pro-Japanese newspaper in North America. He turned down the offer.

=== PR specialist ===
Cowan was one of the most notable public relations specialists in Canada. In 1930, he opened the first public relations firm, Editorial Services Limited, in the country.

As a press relations specialist, he was involved in Brewer's Warehousing, International Nickel, Revenue Properties, Steeprock Iron Mines' and Canada Steamship Lines' press relations in Canada. He also served as an advisor to politicians and political parties in Canada, and to United States President Franklin D. Roosevelt from 1935 to 1939. Cowan served as the Director for Press Relations for Rank Films of Great Britain where he also assisted British actors Alec Guinness, Laurence Olivier, John Mills, Deborah Kerr, Trevor Howard, Jean Simmons, Stewart Granger, Basil Rathbone, Michael Redgrave and Leslie Howard.

In a featured section of the Marketing Magazine written by Dean Walker, Cowan was named as the phantom Canadian of Press Relations.

Cowan was, as one writer described him, the "acknowledged master mind of the public-relations business" at age 44. At age 60, another article headlined that he was the "Dean of Canada's PR Men." The article noted that, "When Cowan picks up that telephone, it seems he can reach almost any level of business, government, or the communications industry. His clients include some of Canada's most intriguing enterprises and his relationship with many of them stays unknown." The writer referred to him being known as a "grey eminence" in the international business world.

==== Stratford Festival ====
Cowan was one of the founding fathers of the Stratford Festival in Stratford, Ontario, in the early 1950s. Canadian theater legend Dora Mavor Moore approached Cowan to advise on the public relations strategy for the project and to assist in creating connections with the theater community in Great Britain. He introduced Moore and Tom Patterson to Leonard Brockington who was then the President of the Rank Organization. That led to the Rank team assisting the Stratford committee in setting a realistic budget. Rank also contributed about 25% of the initial financing of the Stratford Festival. Key to the first season was having a well known performer to headline the season. Rank's London office arranged for Alec Guinness to be released from a picture commitment to enable him to come to Stratford for the first season. As a public relations specialist, James Cowan had the concept to create Stratford not only as an event but as a destination. Cowan also believed that it was critical to have a very strong pre-season ticket sales rather than trying to build the project gradually. His strategy included launching the plays like a movie premier, something he knew well as the North American public relations director for Rank Films and the Odeon Theaters. James Cowan and his friend John Frame provided the first year's pre-season opening campaign as a donation. Cowan convinced his sister-in-law Mary Jolliffe to be Stratford's first publicist. She had just left her career as a teacher. With Cowan's mentoring and her remarkable talents, Jolliffe served successfully in the position for seven seasons. The first season was so successful that a great number skeptical Stratford citizens who had delayed purchasing tickets were disappointed as the season was sold out. As the great Canadian playwright Merrill Denison later commented on Cowan's role in the Stratford story, "Jimmy Cowan? He helped to organize the whole thing."

=== Community service ===
He also served as the Canadian Cancer Society's first national campaign chairman and as a member of the national board for 18 years.

Cowan was recognized for his community service and was awarded the Queen Elizabeth II Coronation Medal in 1953.

=== Others ===
Cowan served as a personal and corporate advisor to Cyrus Eaton of Chesapeake and Ohio Railway. He was elected the first president of the Canadian Film Institute in 1951 until 1962. He was also one of the founding board members of CTV Television Network in Canada and one of the people behind Expo '67.

He was also a promoter of British films like Henry V, and other Shakespearian films to North America, and Canada.

Cowan loved nature. His love of nature included a number of conservation projects including his work helping to secure Canadian support of the Quetico-Superior Foundation to preserve the boundary waters area that created the largest international wilderness preserve in the world.

He also had a great interest in promoting adult education and literacy. He worked with the Canadian Association for Adult Education led by J. R. Kidd of the Ontario Institute for Studies in Education on many different projects.

The prolific mystery novelist, Frances Shelley Wees, based one of her recurring sleuths on her friend, James A. Cowan. Prior to becoming a novelist, she was also in the public relations world. Her novel's mystery was often solved by "Dr. Jonathan Merrill with the aid of his pretty young sister. Dr. Merrill is a psychologist who lectures at University of Toronto and acts as consultant to the Toronto police." Bruce Byrnes, in a 1957 Toronto Telegram book review of Wees' book, Murder in Muskoka, "But most readers are likely to make the wrong guess about Dr. Merrill, the hero of the piece. He does have a real-life model — not a detective, psychologist or anyone connected with police work, but a Toronto public relations man (who is in on the secret)." In 1955, Wees inscribed a copy of, "M'Lord I Am Not Guilty" to Cowan and confirmed the secret identity. She wrote, "for JAC - alias Jonathan Merrill with apologies for an insufficiently valuable characterization."

== Death ==
Cowan died on September 9, 1978, at Bracebridge, Ontario, and was buried at the Mickle Cemetery in Gravenhurst, Ontario.
