= Charles Cowan (cricketer) =

Welsh-born English cricketer

Charles Frederick Roy Cowan DSO JP DL (18 September 1883 – 22 March 1958) was a Welsh-born English cricketer who played first-class cricket in 27 matches for Warwickshire between 1909 and 1921, and in two matches for armed forces cricket teams in 1919. He was born at Glangrwyney, Crickhowell, Brecknockshire and died in hospital at Leamington Spa, Warwickshire.

Cowan was an amateur right-handed middle-order or opening batsman whose appearances in regular cricket were restricted by his career in the Royal Navy. He was educated at the Britannia Royal Naval College at Dartmouth, Devon, passing out in 1899. As a naval cadet, he was posted to HMS Crescent and then in 1902 as an acting sub-lieutenant to HMS Revenge, a pre-Dreadnought battleship. The following year he was deployed as a full sub-lieutenant to the depot ship HMS Orion, based in Malta, for operation on the torpedo boat destroyer HMS Seal and he was still there when promoted to full lieutenant in 1905. At the start of 1907, still lieutenant, he was sent to the newly commissioned HMS Hibernia, flagship of the North Atlantic Fleet, and then in 1911 he was posted to the refitted HMS Cumberland. By the end of the First World War, Cowan had reached the rank of Commander and was in charge of HMS Nairana, a converted ferry used to launch seaplanes which was deployed off the northern coast of Russia during the North Russia Campaign of UK involvement in the Russian Civil War. In retirement in 1928, he was promoted from the rank of Commander to Captain.

== Cricket career ==
The announcement in The Times of Cowan's forthcoming marriage in June 1911 indicates that his family was at that stage living at Stratford-upon-Avon and he therefore qualified to play cricket for Warwickshire by residence; he also played club cricket for Leamington Cricket Club. He played first-class cricket for the first time in a single match in 1909, appeared in five more games in 1910 and then played six times in Warwickshire's unexpected County Championship-winning season of 1911. In these games, his single innings of more than 50 came against Lancashire in 1911, when he made an unbeaten 51. Naval duties and war then meant he disappeared from first-class cricket for eight seasons, but he reappeared for Warwickshire in the 1919 season and, although the county had one of its worst-ever seasons, finishing bottom of the County Championship, Cowan had some individual success as a batsman, though his highest innings of the year came in a first-class match for a combined Army and Navy side against a "Demobilised Officers XI", when he made 67 not out. There were further matches for Warwickshire in 1920 and 1921, when he occasionally captained the county side; in the match against Hampshire in 1920, he made 78 as an opening batsman and this was his highest first-class score, though it was of little avail in the face of a Hampshire first innings of 616 and Warwickshire lost by an innings.

Though Cowan did not play first-class cricket after 1921, he resumed his association with Warwickshire on his retirement from the Royal Navy, acting as captain of the second eleven in the Minor Counties Championship in the early 1930s and in other second eleven matches after Warwickshire had dropped out of the Minor Counties, through to 1936. He was also honorary treasurer of the Warwickshire club from 1942 until shortly before his death.

Outside cricket, he was a Justice of the Peace and a Deputy Lieutenant of Warwickshire.
