= Rachel Cowan =

Rabbi and founder of Institute for Jewish Spirituality (1941–2018)

- Born: Rachel Ann Brown; May 29, 1941; Princeton, New Jersey, U.S.
- Died: August 31, 2018 (aged 77); Manhattan, New York, U.S.
- Education: Bryn Mawr College; Hebrew Union College-Jewish Institute of Religion
- Known for: Founder of Institute for Jewish Spirituality; Creator of Jewish healing service
- Spouse: Paul Cowan (m. 1965; died 1988)
- Children: 2

Rachel Cowan (May 29, 1941 – August 31, 2018) was a rabbi, leader, and spiritual innovator who founded the Institute for Jewish Spirituality. She helped interfaith families find more welcoming community in Jewish ritual life and was the mother of the "Jewish Healing" movement.

== Early life and education ==
Rachel Ann Brown was born May 29, 1941 in Princeton, NJ to Arthur A. Brown, a mathematician who could trace his ancestry to the Mayflower and Margaret Warren Brown, whose roots went back to Puritan days and who worked to create children's school libraries in the Boston public schools. She was the oldest of four children, grew up in Wellesley, Massachusetts and was brought up in the Unitarian Church and Quaker tradition. She attended Bryn Mawr College majoring in sociology. After college she and her sister Connie joined the Freedom Riders, tutoring Black children in newly integrated schools. It was during this time that she met her future husband Paul Cowan, who was from a midwestern assimilated Jewish family and later became a writer and reporter for the Village Voice. They spent time in Mississippi registering Black voters and later after they married in 1965 served in the Peace Corps in Ecuador.

== Career ==
In 1968, the Cowans moved to Manhattan’s Upper West Side becoming involved in the 1970s Jewish revival in their neighborhood and were active in their synagogue Ansche Chesed. During this time Ansche Chesed housed five small congregations but had no rabbi. Realizing rabbis could enhance lifecycle events and provide counseling some members pursued ordination including Cowan, who converted to Judaism in 1980.

Rachel Cowan and her husband became advocates for interfaith couples, co-authoring the book Mixed Blessings: Overcoming the Stumbling Blocks in an Interfaith Marriage (1988). She traveled the country to speak with communities about how to integrate non-Jewish members of interfaith families into synagogue life.

Paul was diagnosed with leukemia in September 1987 and died a year later. Rachel and her Jewish feminist friends lamented the scarcity of Jewish spiritual care resources for those facing serious illness and their families. While Christian communities had well-established models of spiritual healing services and other faith-based healing rituals, Jewish communal offerings were limited to hospital chaplains, a few hospices, rabbinic visits to the seriously ill, and the traditional practices of bikur holim and communal prayers for healing. They recognized a deep and widespread need for Jewish spiritual and communal resources dedicated to healing, especially beyond medical settings.

In 1989, Cowan completed her rabbinic studies at the Hebrew Union College-Jewish Institute of Religion. From 1990 to 2003 she served as the program director for the Jewish Life program at the Nathan Cummings Foundation. Pioneering efforts to integrate spiritual practices to support those who were suffering from illness or personal loss, she co-founded the Jewish Healing Center in 1990. Utilizing a combination of traditional texts, secular literature, mental health methodologies, and insights from other faith traditions, healing services were created which encompassed elements such as songs, psalms, chants, ritual immersions in a mikvah, and meditation sessions.

Cowan founded and served as the Executive Director (2004-2011) for the Institute for Jewish Spirituality (IJS), which offers retreats and programs for rabbis, cantors, Jewish educators, and lay leaders combining Jewish wisdom with contemplative practices like meditation and mindfulness. Rabbi Lisa Goldstein, who succeeded Cowan at IJS from 2011 to 2019, noted "she was always a seeker, and things happened in her life to which the Jewish community had no adequate response". In 2015, Cowan co-wrote Wise Aging: Living with Joy, Resilience, & Spirit which focused on religious and spiritual approaches to aging.

== Personal life and death ==
Rachel and Paul Cowan married in 1965 and had two children.

Rachel Cowan's final years were marked by her battle with glioblastoma, an aggressive form of brain cancer. She died on August 31, 2018, less than a week after John McCain died of the same disease. About a year before she died, she recorded a video asking members of Congress to preserve Medicare, urging them to talk to their constituents whose lives were in their hands.
