= James Cowan (Scottish cricketer) =

Scottish cricketer (1929–2022)

Personal information
- Full name: James Ferguson Cowan
- Born: 17 May 1929; Penicuik, Midlothian, Scotland
- Died: 8 September 2022 (aged 93); Midlothian, Scotland
- Batting: Left-handed

Domestic team information
- Years: Team
- 1960–1962: Scotland

Career statistics
Competition	First-class
Matches	3
Runs scored	52
Batting average	6.00
100s/50s	–/–
Top score	18
Catches/stumpings	1/–
- Source: Cricinfo, 29 June 2022

James Ferguson Cowan (17 May 1929 – 8 September 2022) was a Scottish first-class cricketer.

Cowan was born in May 1929 at Penicuik, Midlothian. He was educated at George Watson's College, before matriculating to the University of Edinburgh. A club cricketer for Watsonians Cricket Club, Cowan made his debut for Scotland in first-class cricket against Ireland at Paisley in 1960. He played two further first-class matches for Scotland, both against Warwickshire at Edgbaston on Scotland's 1961 and 1962 tours of England. In his three first-class matches, Cowan scored 52 runs at an average of 10.40, with a highest score of 18. He died in Midlothian on 8 September 2022, at the age of 93.
