= James Cowan (English cricketer) =

English cricketer (born 1989)

Personal information
- Full name: James Daniel Cowan
- Born: 17 August 1989 (age 37); Cambridge, Cambridgeshire, England
- Batting: Left-handed
- Bowling: Left-arm medium-fast

Domestic team information
- Years: Team
- 2010–2011: Cambridgeshire
- 2011–2013: Cambridge MCCU

Career statistics
Competition	First-class
Matches	2
Runs scored	26
Batting average	6.50
100s/50s	–/–
Top score	11
Balls bowled	276
Wickets	5
Bowling average	33.40
5 wickets in innings	–
10 wickets in match	–
Best bowling	2/29
Catches/stumpings	–/–
- Source: Cricinfo, 19 July 2019

James Daniel Cowan (born 17 August 1989) is an English former first-class cricketer.

Cowan was born at Cambridge in August 1989. He was educated at Swavesey Village College, before going up to Anglia Ruskin University. While studying at Anglia Ruskin, he made two appearances in first-class cricket for Cambridge MCCU against Middlesex in 2011 and 2013. He scored 26 runs in his two matches, as well as taking 5 wickets with his left-arm medium-fast bowler, with best figures of 2 for 29. In addition to playing first-class cricket, he also played minor counties cricket for Cambridgeshire in 2010 and 2011, making three appearances in the Minor Counties Championship and two appearances in the MCCA Knockout Trophy.
