= John Cowan (RAN officer) =

John Joseph Cowan
- Born: 23 July 1957 (age 69); Penticton, British Columbia, Canada
- Military career
- Allegiance: Canada; Australia
- Branch: Royal Canadian Navy (1976–96); Royal Australian Navy (1996–)
- Service years: 1976 – present
- Rank: Captain
- Commands: HMAS Choules; HMAS Sirius; HMAS Cerberus; STS Young Endeavour
- Conflicts: International Force for East Timor; Operation Sharp Guard
- Awards: Conspicuous Service Cross; Canadian Forces' Decoration

Captain John Joseph Cowan CSC, CD (born 23 July 1957) is a Royal Australian Navy (RAN) officer. Cowan originally joined the Royal Canadian Navy (RCN) in 1976 as an ordinary seaman boatswain, eventually being commissioned as an officer in 1988, but transferred to the RAN in 1996. He was the commissioning Commanding Officer of HMAS Choules (2011–12).

== Early life ==
Cowan was born on 23 July 1957 in Penticton, British Columbia. He joined the Navy League Cadet Corps in his youth and, at age 13, transferred to the Royal Canadian Sea Cadets (RCSC). During his time in the RCSC he spent time onboard CCGS Quadra and later HMC Ship's Terra Nova and Yukon.

== Service history ==
=== Royal Canadian Navy ===
John joined the Royal Canadian Navy as an ordinary seaman boatswain in 1976. He is qualified as a surface warfare specialist. He was deployed as part of the Canadian response and support to Operation Sharp Guard for the blockade of the former Yugoslavia. He qualified as a navigator during his seaman officer training course.

He spent the majority of his career as sea serving mainly with the Maritime Forces Pacific. He retired from the Royal Canadian Navy on 7 July 1996 after 13 years service.

=== Royal Australian Navy ===
John joined the Royal Australian Navy on 8 July 1996, retaining his commission and qualification as a ships navigator. He served as the navigator onboard HMA Ship's Brisbane and Tobruk.

John commanded HMAS Sirius from December 2008 until May 2010 and took command of HMAS Choules for its commissioning for April 2011 until December 2012.

Military offices
Preceded by Newly commissioned	Commanding Officer HMAS Choules; April 2011 – December 2012	Succeeded by Commander Ashley Papp
