= Shakespeare, Ontario =

Shakespeare
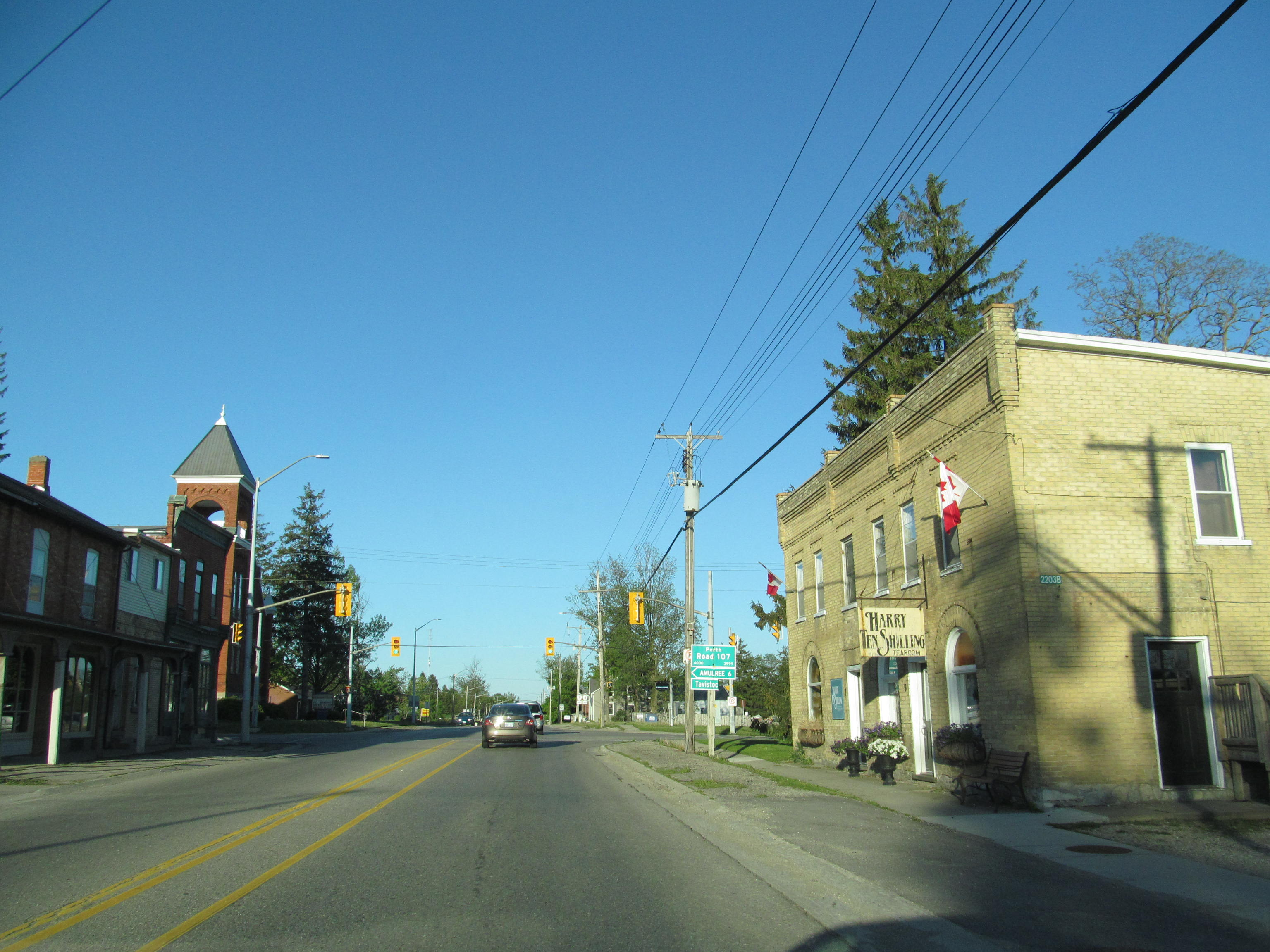
- Motto: Where Antique and Unique Meet
- Location of Shakespeare in Ontario
- Coordinates: 43°22′9″N 80°50′12″W
- Country: Canada
- Province: Ontario
- County: Perth
- Municipality: Perth East
- Founded: 1832
- Founder: David Bell
- Named for: William Shakespeare

Area
  - Total: 36.53 km^{2} (14.10 sq mi)
- Elevation: 374 m (1,227 ft)

Population
  - Total: 750
  - Density: 4.4/km^{2} (11/sq mi)
- Time zone: UTC-5 (EST)
  - Summer (DST): UTC-4 (EDT)
- Postal code: N0B 2P0
- Area codes: 519, 226

Shakespeare is a village and designated place within the municipality of Perth East in Perth County, Ontario, Canada. Shakespeare is located on the Highway 7/8, just east of Stratford and west of the Kitchener/Waterloo Region.

== History ==
Shakespeare was founded in 1832 by David Bell, a Scottish emigrate from Dumfriesshire, Scotland and was previously known as Bell's Corner. The name was changed to Shakespeare in 1852 when Alexander Mitchell suggested naming the town after his favourite playwright.

== Demographics ==
In the 2021 Census of Population conducted by Statistics Canada, Shakespeare had a population of 160 living in 71 of its 103 total private dwellings, a change of −5.9% from its 2016 population of 170. With a land area of 36.53 km^{2} (14.10 sq mi), it had a population density of 4.4/km^{2} (11.3/sq mi) in 2021.

== Events ==
Every year Shakespeare celebrates the community with its own holiday, called Field day, which is celebrated on the second Saturday of June. The event begins with the annual Fireman's Breakfast at the Shakespeare Optimist Hall, followed by a soap box derby, baseball games in the morning and a themed parade at 1 pm. Throughout the day there are free, fun events for children including races, games, and jumpy castles. In the evening, the town gathers for the Shakespeare Community Athletic Association (SCAA) Fish Fry and Dance. Shakespeare celebrated its 70th Field day in 2017, the theme was Canada's 150th - through the decades.
