= 1983–84 VfL Bochum season =

VfL Bochum
1983–84 season
- President: Ottokar Wüst
- Head Coach: Rolf Schafstall
- Stadium: Ruhrstadion
- Bundesliga: 15th
- DFB-Pokal: First Round
- Top goalscorer: League: Christian Schreier (18); All: Christian Schreier (18)
- Highest home attendance: 32,000 (vs FC Bayern Munich, 24 September 1983; Borussia Dortmund, 28 April 1984)
- Lowest home attendance: 12,000 (vs SV Waldhof Mannheim, 11 February 1984)
- Average home league attendance: 19,117
Home colours	Away colours	Third colours

The 1983–84 VfL Bochum season was the 46th season in club history.

== Matches ==
=== Legend ===
Win Draw Loss

=== Bundesliga ===
13 August 1983 1	VfL Bochum	1–0	Kickers Offenbach	Bochum
15:30	Kuntz 73'			Stadium: Ruhrstadion; Attendance: 16,000; Referee: Volker Huster (Lahnstein)

20 August 1983 2	SV Werder Bremen	5–2	VfL Bochum	Bremen
15:30	Meier 13', 57'; Neubarth 47'; Völler 52', 78'		Kuntz 40'; Pater 75'	Stadium: Weserstadion; Attendance: 18,000; Referee: Peter Correll (Heilbronn)

23 August 1983 3	VfL Bochum	3–1	Eintracht Braunschweig	Bochum
20:00	Schreier 41'; Knüwe 43'; Kuntz 75'		Worm 34'	Stadium: Ruhrstadion; Attendance: 15,000; Referee: Hans-Peter Dellwing (Trier)

31 August 1983 4	SV Waldhof Mannheim	3–3	VfL Bochum	Ludwigshafen am Rhein
18:30	Walter 2', 7'; Hein 85'		Schulz 20'; Knüwe 64'; Kuntz 89'	Stadium: Südweststadion; Attendance: 30,000; Referee: Franz-Josef Hontheim (Trier)

3 September 1983 5	VfB Stuttgart	4–2	VfL Bochum	Stuttgart
15:30	Corneliusson 50', 84', 86'; Müller 78'		Benatelli 18'; Oswald 60'	Stadium: Neckarstadion; Attendance: 19,000; Referee: Friedrich Retzmann (Pinneberg)

10 September 1983 6	VfL Bochum	0–4	Borussia Mönchengladbach	Bochum
15:30			Lienen 62', 87'; Mill 65'; Matthäus 79' (pen.)	Stadium: Ruhrstadion; Attendance: 19,000; Referee: Werner Föckler (Bad Dürkheim)

17 September 1983 7	1. FC Köln	3–0	VfL Bochum	Cologne
15:30	Fischer 1', 43'; Littbarski 73'			Stadium: Radrennbahn Müngersdorf; Attendance: 7,000; Referee: Hans-Heinrich Barnick (Schenfeld)

24 September 1983 8	VfL Bochum	3–1	FC Bayern Munich	Bochum
15:30	Schulz 8', 76'; Oswald 57'		K.-H. Rummenigge 90'	Stadium: Ruhrstadion; Attendance: 32,000; Referee: Volker Roth (Salzgitter)

30 September 1983 9	1. FC Nürnberg	3–1	VfL Bochum	Nuremberg
20:00	Heck 52', 73'; Lottermann 90'		Schreier 31'	Stadium: Städtisches Stadion; Attendance: 16,000; Referee: Wolf-Günter Wiesel (Ottbergen)

15 October 1983 10	VfL Bochum	4–1	Eintracht Frankfurt	Bochum
15:30	Oswald 8'; Woelk 47'; Kuntz 48'		Kroth 56'	Stadium: Ruhrstadion; Attendance: 15,000; Referee: Udo Horeis (Hamburg)

22 October 1983 11	Hamburger SV	2–1	VfL Bochum	Hamburg
15:30	Kaltz 57' (pen.); Hartwig 86'		Žugčić 31'	Stadium: Volksparkstadion; Attendance: 16,000; Referee: Dieter Michel (Augsburg)

29 October 1983 12	VfL Bochum	4–1	1. FC Kaiserslautern	Bochum
15:30	Schulz 37'; Schreier 44', 45' (pen.); Kuntz 61'		Brehme 32'	Stadium: Ruhrstadion; Attendance: 16,000; Referee: Robert Walz (Waiblingen)

4 November 1983 13	Borussia Dortmund	1–1	VfL Bochum	Dortmund
20:00	Eggeling 9'		Schreier 45'	Stadium: Westfalenstadion; Attendance: 30,000; Referee: Dieter Stäglich (Bonn)

12 November 1983 14	VfL Bochum	2–2	Bayer 05 Uerdingen	Bochum
15:30	Schreier 67'; Schulz 83'		Funkel 38'; Herget 84'	Stadium: Ruhrstadion; Attendance: 20,000; Referee: Karl-Josef Assenmacher (Fischenich)

26 November 1983 15	Bayer 04 Leverkusen	3–0	VfL Bochum	Leverkusen
15:30	Hörster 57'; Vöge 76'; Cha 86'			Stadium: Ulrich-Haberland-Stadion; Attendance: 7,800; Referee: Wilfried Heitmann (Drentwede)

2 December 1983 16	VfL Bochum	2–3	Arminia Bielefeld	Bochum
20:00	Schulz 29'; Hupe 40' (o.g.)		Pagelsdorf 12', 85'; Pohl 82'	Stadium: Ruhrstadion; Attendance: 15,000; Referee: Manfred Neuner (Leimen)

10 December 1983 17	Fortuna Düsseldorf	1–1	VfL Bochum	Düsseldorf
15:30	Wenzel 72'		Schreier 59'	Stadium: Rheinstadion; Attendance: 14,500; Referee: Siegfried Brehm (Kemmern)

21 January 1984 18	Kickers Offenbach	2–2	VfL Bochum	Offenbach am Main
15:30	Hofeditz 15'; Michelberger 81'		Woelk 21' (pen.); Bönighausen 35'	Stadium: Stadion am Bieberer Berg; Attendance: 8,000; Referee: Gerhard Theobald (Neunkirchen)

28 January 1984 19	VfL Bochum	3–3	SV Werder Bremen	Bochum
15:30	Kuntz 18'; Schreier 35', 58'		Žugčić 75' (o.g.); Neubarth 76'; Völler 87'	Stadium: Ruhrstadion; Attendance: 19,000; Referee: Winfried Walz (Waiblingen)

4 February 1984 20	Eintracht Braunschweig	3–1	VfL Bochum	Braunschweig
15:30	Zavišić 5'; Studzizba 47'; Keute 84'		Schreier 66'	Stadium: Eintracht-Stadion; Attendance: 16,000; Referee: Heinz Werner (Auersmacher)

11 February 1984 21	VfL Bochum	1–0	SV Waldhof Mannheim	Bochum
15:30	Woelk 48' (pen.)			Stadium: Ruhrstadion; Attendance: 12,000; Referee: Friedrich Retzmann (Pinneberg)

21 April 1984 22	VfL Bochum	0–1	VfB Stuttgart	Bochum
15:30			Müller 9'	Stadium: Ruhrstadion; Attendance: 25,000; Referee: Franz-Josef Hontheim (Trier)

25 February 1984 23	Borussia Mönchengladbach	4–2	VfL Bochum	Mönchengladbach
15:30	Bruns 28'; Rahn 49'; Mill 75', 81'		Schreier 5'; Woelk 41' (pen.)	Stadium: Bökelbergstadion; Attendance: 11,540; Referee: Walter Eschweiler (Euskirchen)

10 March 1984 24	VfL Bochum	2–3	1. FC Köln	Bochum
15:30	Schreier 56' (pen.), 88'		Fischer 57'; Hartmann 59'; Willmer 87'	Stadium: Ruhrstadion; Attendance: 14,000; Referee: Rüdiger Wuttke (Oberhausen)

17 March 1984 25	FC Bayern Munich	5–1	VfL Bochum	Munich
15:30	M. Rummenigge 7'; Pflügler 9'; Hoeneß 14', 73'; K.-H. Rummenigge 44'		Schreier 89'	Stadium: Olympiastadion; Attendance: 15,000; Referee: Peter Gabor (West Berlin)

24 March 1984 26	VfL Bochum	2–0	1. FC Nürnberg	Bochum
15:30	Lameck 65'; Schreier 73'			Stadium: Ruhrstadion; Attendance: 14,000; Referee: Hans-Joachim Osmers (Bremen)

31 March 1984 27	Eintracht Frankfurt	1–0	VfL Bochum	Frankfurt am Main
15:30	Falkenmayer 80'			Stadium: Waldstadion; Attendance: 16,500; Referee: Karl-Heinz Tritschler (Freiburg)

6 April 1984 28	VfL Bochum	1–1	Hamburger SV	Bochum
20:00	Oswald 38'		Wuttke 63'	Stadium: Ruhrstadion; Attendance: 30,000; Referee: Dieter Niebergall (Ramsbach)

13 April 1984 29	1. FC Kaiserslautern	2–0	VfL Bochum	Kaiserslautern
20:00	Nilsson 75'; Allofs 87'			Stadium: Betzenbergstadion; Attendance: 13,080; Referee: Winfried Walz (Waiblingen)

28 April 1984 30	VfL Bochum	2–2	Borussia Dortmund	Bochum
15:30	Schreier 21'; Kühn 33'		Wegmann 48'; Rüssmann 57'	Stadium: Ruhrstadion; Attendance: 32,000; Referee: Dieter Pauly (Rheydt)

4 May 1984 31	Bayer 05 Uerdingen	1–2	VfL Bochum	Krefeld
20:00	Sackewitz 67'		Oswald 45'; Bönighausen 53'	Stadium: Grotenburg-Stadion; Attendance: 11,000; Referee: Volker Roth (Salzgitter)

12 May 1984 32	VfL Bochum	2–1	Bayer 04 Leverkusen	Bochum
15:30	Oswald 32'; Kree 73'		Vöge 85'	Stadium: Ruhrstadion; Attendance: 13,000; Referee: Siegfried Brehm (Kemmern)

19 May 1984 33	Arminia Bielefeld	2–1	VfL Bochum	Bielefeld
15:30	Grillemeier 53' (pen.); Schnier 77' (pen.)		Pater 78'	Stadium: Alm; Attendance: 8,000; Referee: Karl-Heinz Tritschler (Freiburg)

26 May 1984 34	VfL Bochum	6–1	Fortuna Düsseldorf	Bochum
15:30	Kühn 17'; Schulz 54'; Bönighausen 56'; Schreier 61', 85'; Gothe 63'		Bommer 60'	Stadium: Ruhrstadion; Attendance: 18,000; Referee: Peter Correll (Heilbronn)

=== DFB-Pokal ===
26 August 1983 R1	Alemannia Aachen	1–0	VfL Bochum	Aachen
	Rombach 52'			Stadium: Tivoli; Attendance: 8,000; Referee: Dieter Pauly (Rheydt)

== Squad ==
=== Squad and statistics ===
==== Squad, appearances and goals scored ====
No.	Pos	Nat	Player	Total		Bundesliga		DFB-Pokal	
No.	Pos	Nat	Player	Apps	Goals	Apps	Goals	Apps	Goals
	FW	(West Germany) FRG	Frank Benatelli	15	1	15	1	0	0
	DF	(West Germany) FRG	Siegfried Bönighausen	33	3	32	3	1	0
	MF	(West Germany) FRG	Andreas Bordan	0	0	0	0	0	0
	DF	(West Germany) FRG	Bernd Gerber	5	0	4	0	1	0
	DF	(West Germany) FRG	Hermann Gerland	8	0	7	0	1	0
	DF	(West Germany) FRG	Florian Gothe	18	1	18	1	0	0
	MF	(West Germany) FRG	Peter Grünberger	7	0	7	0	0	0
	FW	(West Germany) FRG	Günter Habig	0	0	0	0	0	0
	FW	(West Germany) FRG	Frank Islacker	0	0	0	0	0	0
	DF	(West Germany) FRG	Heinz Knüwe	34	2	33	2	1	0
	MF	(West Germany) FRG	Dieter Kramer	0	0	0	0	0	0
	DF	(West Germany) FRG	Martin Kree (since 13 April 1984)	8	1	7	1	1	0
	FW	(West Germany) FRG	Detlef Krella	7	0	7	0	0	0
	MF	(West Germany) FRG	Michael Kühn	19	2	18	2	1	0
	FW	(West Germany) FRG	Stefan Kuntz	33	8	32	8	1	0
	MF	(West Germany) FRG	Michael Lameck	35	1	34	1	1	0
	GK	(West Germany) FRG	Reinhard Mager	3	0	3	0	0	0
	MF	(West Germany) FRG	Walter Oswald	33	6	32	6	1	0
	FW	(West Germany) FRG	Stefan Pater	27	2	27	2	0	0
	FW	(West Germany) FRG	Christian Schreier	34	18	33	18	1	0
	MF	(West Germany) FRG	Frank Schulz	35	7	34	7	1	0
	DF	(West Germany) FRG	Lothar Woelk	32	4	31	4	1	0
	MF	(West Germany) FRG	Reinhold Zagorny	3	0	3	0	0	0
	DF	(Socialist Federal Republic of Yugoslavia) YUG	Ivan Žugčić	22	1	22	1	0	0
	GK	(West Germany) FRG	Ralf Zumdick	32	0	31	0	1	0

=== Transfers ===
==== Summer ====
In:

No.	Pos.	Nation	Player
—	DF	FRG	Siegfried Bönighausen (from Borussia Dortmund)
—	DF	FRG	Bernd Gerber (from VfR Bürstadt)
—	DF	FRG	Florian Gothe (from VfL Bochum II)
—	MF	FRG	Peter Grünberger (from FC Bayern Munich)
—	FW	FRG	Günter Habig (from 1. FC Köln youth)
—	FW	FRG	Stefan Kuntz (from Borussia Neunkirchen)
—	MF	FRG	Frank Schulz (from SC Westfalia Herne)

Out:

No.	Pos.	Nation	Player
—	FW	SWE	Thomas Andersson (to Vasalunds IF)
—	DF	FRG	Dieter Bast (to Bayer 04 Leverkusen)
—	MF	FRG	Ulrich Bittorf (to Bayer 04 Leverkusen)
—	DF	FRG	Michael Jakobs (to FC Schalke 04)
—	MF	FRG	Wolfgang Patzke (to Bayer 04 Leverkusen)
—	DF	FRG	Bernd Storck (to Borussia Dortmund)

==== Winter ====
In:

No.	Pos.	Nation	Player
—	DF	FRG	Martin Kree (from VfL Bochum II)

Out:

No.	Pos.	Nation	Player

== VfL Bochum II ==
No.	Pos	Nat	Player	Total		Oberliga Westfalen	
No.	Pos	Nat	Player	Apps	Goals	Apps	Goals
			Block	16	1	16	1
	MF	(West Germany) FRG	Frank Bornemann	22	2	22	2
	MF	(West Germany) FRG	Dirk Bremser	1	0	1	0
			Bülles	18	3	18	3
	GK	(West Germany) FRG	Markus Croonen	31	0	31	0
	MF	(West Germany) FRG	Dirk Darmstädter	34	2	34	2
	MF	(West Germany) FRG	Michael Eggert	18	5	18	5
			Friedrich	4	0	4	0
	DF	(West Germany) FRG	Florian Gothe	1	0	1	0
	MF	(West Germany) FRG	Frank Heinemann	33	2	33	2
	FW	(West Germany) FRG	Helmut Horsch	3	0	3	0
	MF	(West Germany) FRG	Günter Koslowski	32	3	32	3
	DF	(West Germany) FRG	Martin Kree	23	5	23	5
			Mortier	1	1	1	1
	GK	(West Germany) FRG	Detlef Müller	5	0	5	0
	DF	(West Germany) FRG	Heinz Niggemeier	26	2	26	2
	FW	(West Germany) FRG	Siegfried Riemann	25	14	25	14
			Rohde	11	0	11	0
	MF	(West Germany) FRG	Peter Russok	27	5	27	5
			Sebastian	5	0	5	0
	FW	(West Germany) FRG	Alfons Sikora	16	0	16	0
			Siredas	15	1	15	1
	MF	(West Germany) FRG	Klaus Zagorny	32	2	32	2
	MF	(West Germany) FRG	Reinhold Zagorny	31	12	31	12
