= Gothe (disambiguation) =

Gothe may refer to:

== Surnames ==
- Amon Göth (1908–1946), Austrian Nazi commandant of Kraków-Płaszów concentration camp and executed war criminal
- Bror Geijer Göthe (1892 – 1949) a Swedish artist, a painter and textile artist
- Dieter Göthe former East German slalom canoeist
- Erik Gustaf Göthe (1779 – 1838) a Swedish sculptor
- Florian Gothe (born 1962) a retired German football defender
- Jurgen Gothe (1944 - 2015) a Canadian radio host
- Odd Christian Gøthe (1919 - 2002) a Norwegian civil servant and politician
- Staffan Göthe (born 1944) a Swedish playwright, actor and director

== Places ==
- Gothe, a village in Karnataka, India.

== See also ==
- Goethe (surname)
- Goth (disambiguation)
- Gotha
- Goda (disambiguation)
