= Goethe (surname) =

Goethe (also Göthe and Gœthe) is a German surname. It is best known for Johann Wolfgang von Goethe (1749–1832). It belongs to the group of surnames derived from given names, in this case given names in Got-, in most cases likely Gottfried (cf. Götz). Variants of the surname include Göth, Goeth and Göthke, Götke.

The name is comparatively rare; the German phonebook (as of 2013) has 176 entries for Göthe and 168 entries for Goethe; 179 entries for Göth and 28 entries for Goeth; 11 entries for Götke and 2 entries for Göthke.

== List of people with the surname ==
Members of Johann Wolfgang von Goethe's family bearing the surname:

- his great-grandfather, Hans Christian Göthe (fl. 1650s), a blacksmith of Kannawurf, Thuringia, married Sibylla Werner
- his grandfather Friedrich Georg Göthe (6 September 1657 – 10 November 1730), lived in Lyon but in 1685 with the suspension of the Edict of Nantes was forced to move to Frankfurt.
- his parents, Johann Caspar Goethe (29 July 1710 – 25 May 1782) and Catharina Elisabeth Goethe, née Textor (19 February 1731 – 13 September 1808)
- his wife (m. 1806) and former mistress Christiane von Goethe (1765–1816) née Vulpius
- their son August von Goethe (born out of wedlock 25 December 1789, died 28 October 1830), and his wife Ottilie von Goethe, née von Pogwisch (31 October 1796 – 26 October 1872).

Other people called Goethe, Göthe, Gothe or Göth:

- Amon Göth (1908-1946), SS functionary
- Bror Geijer Göthe (1892–1949), Swedish artist
- Charles Goethe (1875–1966), American activist
- Dieter Göthe (fl. 1950s), East German slalom canoer
- Erik Gustaf Göthe (1779–1838) Swedish sculptor
- Florian Gothe (born 1962) retired German football defender
- Franz Goethe (1881–1921), German artist
- Johann Friedrich Eosander von Göthe (1669–1728) — German Late-Baroque architect
- Jurgen Gothe (1944–2015) Canadian radio host
- Matthias Goethe (1827–1876) German-Australian pastor
- Odd Christian Gøthe (1919–2002) Norwegian civil servant and politician
- Oliver Goethe (born 2004) Danish-German racing driver
- Staffan Göthe (born 1944) Swedish playwright, actor and director

== See also ==
- Goethe (disambiguation)
- Gothe (disambiguation)
- Goth (surname)
