= Gunnar Jansson (athlete) =

Swedish hammer thrower

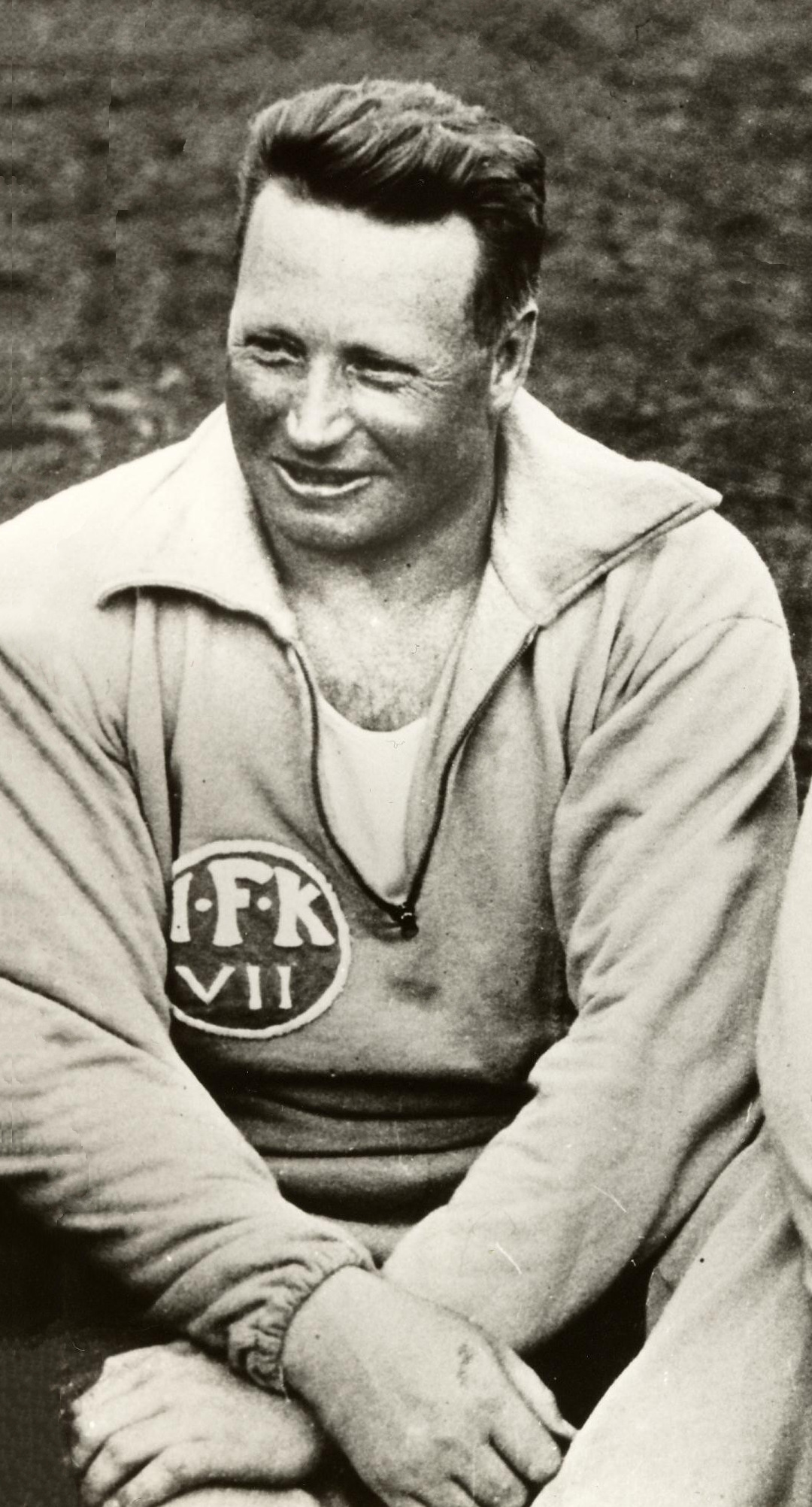

Personal information
- Born: 13 October 1897 Fellingsbro, Sweden
- Died: 15 December 1953 (aged 56) Eskilstuna, Sweden
- Height: 1.89 m (6 ft 2 in)
- Weight: 108 kg (238 lb)

Sport
- Sport: Athletics
- Event: Hammer throw
- Club: IFK Eskilstuna

Achievements and titles
- Personal best: 53.41 m (1935)
Medal record
Men's athletics
Representing Sweden
European Championships
Bronze medal – third place	1934 Turin	Hammer throw

Johan Gunnar Jansson (13 October 1897 – 15 December 1953) was a Swedish hammer thrower who competed at two Olympic Games.

== Biography ==
Jansson finished second behind fellow Swede Ossian Skiöld in the hammer throw event at the 1931 AAA Championships.

He competed at the 1932 Summer Olympics, finishing in 7th in the hammer throw event. Jansson won a bronze medal at the 1934 European Championships before going to his second Olympic Games, finishing 12th in the hammer throw event at the 1936 Summer Olympics. Jansson held Swedish titles in the hammer throw in 1931, 1933–35 and 1937 and in the weight throw in 1929–31, 1933–35, 1937 and 1938.
