= Goth (surname) =

Goth, Göth (also Goeth) or Góth is a surname of German and Hungarian origin.

The German-language surname is a variant of Goethe (also Göthe), which belongs to the group of surnames derived from given names, in this case given names in Got-, in most cases likely Gottfried (cf. Götz). The name is comparatively rare; the German phonebook (as of 2013) has 179 entries for Göth and 28 entries for Goeth.

== Notable people with the surname ==
Goth

- Elisabeth Goth, American horse breeder and businesswoman
- Marie Goth (1887–1975), American painter
- Mia Goth (born 1993), English actress and model

Göth or Goeth

- Amon Göth (1908–1946), Austrian Nazi commandant of Kraków-Płaszów concentration camp and executed war criminal
  - Jennifer Teege (née Göth; born 1970), daughter of Monika Hertwig
    - Monika Hertwig (née Göth; born 1945), daughter of Amon Göth and subject of the 2006 documentary Inheritance
- Eduard Göth (1898–1944), Austrian teacher and resistance fighter against the Nazi regime
- Georg Göth (1803–1873), Austrian historian and naturalist
- Martin Göth (born 1957), German composer
- Ottilie Goeth (1836–1926), German-American author

Góth

- Móric Góth (1873–1944), Hungarian painter, father of Sárika Góth
- Sándor Góth (1869–1946), Hungarian actor and director
- Sárika Góth (1880–1953), Hungarian-Dutch painter, daughter of Móric Góth

== Fictional characters ==
- Goth family, characters in The Sims video game franchise
  - Bella Goth, a member of the family

== See also ==
- Goethe (surname)
- Goth (disambiguation)
