= Athletics at the 1928 Summer Olympics – Men's hammer throw =

Olympic athletics event

Men's hammer throw at the Games of the IX Olympiad
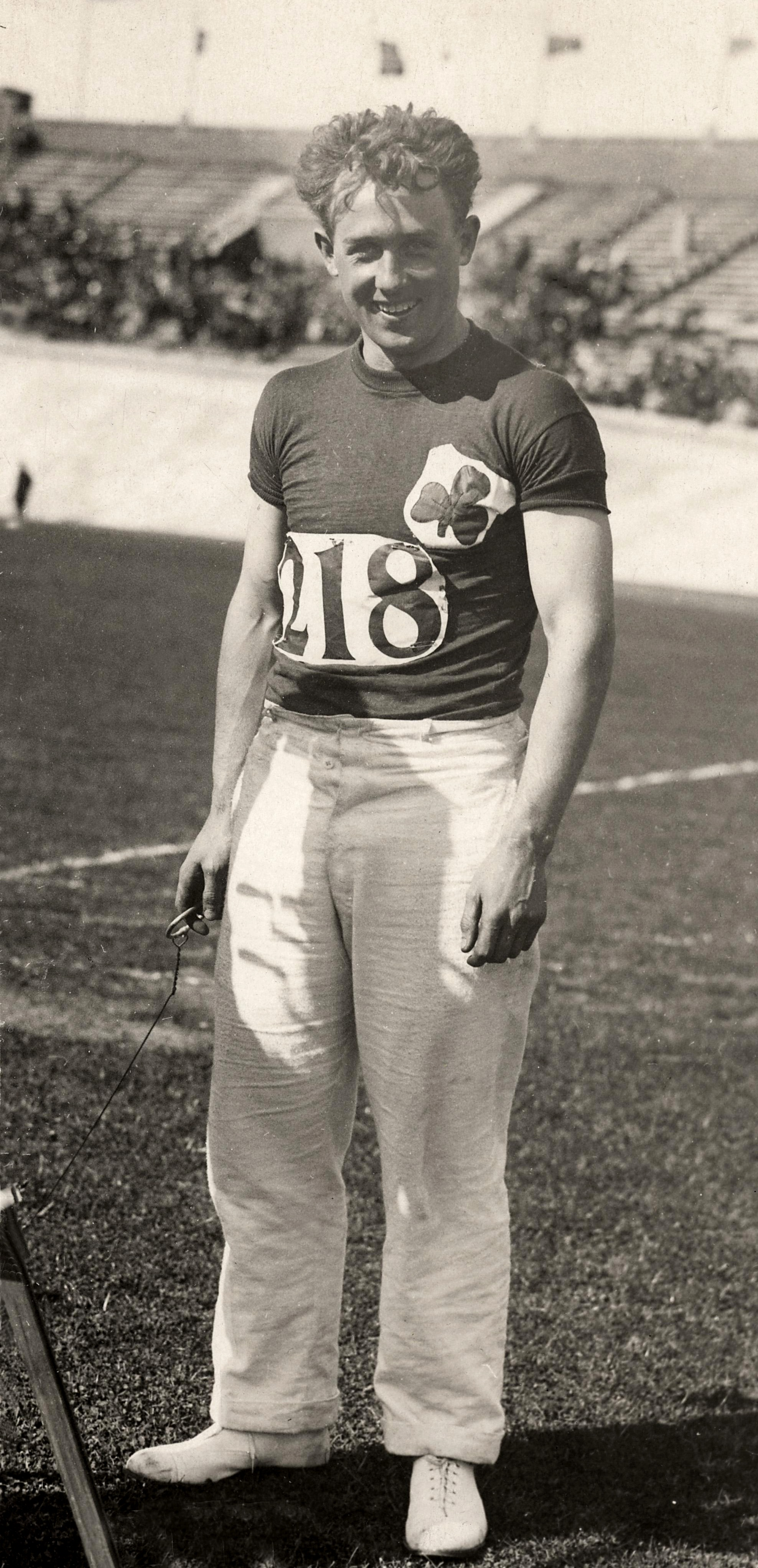
- Pat O'Callaghan
- Venue: Olympic Stadium
- Date: July 30, 1928
- Competitors: 16 from 11 nations
- Winning distance: 51.39

Medalists
1st place, gold medalist(s)		Pat O'Callaghan; Ireland
2nd place, silver medalist(s)		Ossian Skiöld; Sweden
3rd place, bronze medalist(s)		Edmund Black; United States

The men's hammer throw event was part of the track and field athletics programme at the 1928 Summer Olympics. The competition was held on Monday, July 30, 1928. Sixteen hammer throwers from eleven nations competed. The maximum number of athletes per nation was 4. The event was won by Pat O'Callaghan of Ireland, the first gold medal for the nation at the Olympics since it started competing independently in 1924 and the first time the event was won by a non-American (though five of the previous six winners had been born in Ireland before emigrating to the United States). Ossian Skiöld of Sweden took silver, the nation's second medal in the event after another silver in 1920. The Americans, who had earned a gold medal and at least one other medal in each of the previous six hammer throw competitions, took only a bronze this time, with Edmund Black finishing third.

== Background ==
This was the seventh appearance of the event, which has been held at every Summer Olympics except 1896. Three of the six finalists from the 1924 Games returned: bronze medalist Malcolm Nokes of Great Britain, fourth-place finisher Erik Eriksson of Finland, and fifth-place finisher Ossian Skiöld of Sweden. Also returning was 1920 silver medalist (and 1912 finalist and 1924 seventh-place finisher) Carl Johan Lind of Sweden.

Three-time medalist Matt McGrath, then 51 years old, tried to compete again but finished fifth at the U.S. trials to barely miss making the team.

Argentina, Chile, Ireland, Japan, and Norway each made their debut in the event. The United States appeared for the seventh time, the only nation to have competed at each appearance of the event to that point.

== Competition format ==
The competition continued to use the divided-final format used since 1908, with results carrying over between "rounds". Each athlete received three throws in the qualifying round. The top six men advanced to the final, where they received an additional three throws. The best result, qualifying or final, counted.

== Records ==
These were the standing world and Olympic records (in metres) prior to the 1928 Summer Olympics.

World record	Patrick Ryan (USA)	57.77	New York City, United States	17 August 1913
Olympic record	Matt McGrath (USA)	54.74	Stockholm, Sweden	14 July 1912

No new world or Olympic records were set during the competition.

== Schedule ==
Date	Time	Round
Thursday, 28 July 1928	14:00	Qualifying; Final

== Results ==
The best six throwers qualified for the final. The throwing order and the throwing series are not available. The final was held on the same day.

Rank	Athlete	Nation	Qualifying	Final	Distance
1st place, gold medalist(s)	Pat O'Callaghan	Ireland	47.49	51.39	51.39
2nd place, silver medalist(s)	Ossian Skiöld	Sweden	51.29	Unknown	51.29
3rd place, bronze medalist(s)	Edmund Black	United States	49.03	Unknown	49.03
4	Armando Poggioli	Italy	46.96	48.37	48.37
5	Donald Gwinn	United States	47.15	Unknown	47.15
6	Frank Conner	United States	46.75	Unknown	46.75
7	Federico Kleger	Argentina	46.61	Did not advance	46.61
8	Ricardo Bayer	Chile	46.34	Did not advance	46.34
9	Erik Eriksson	Finland	46.22	Did not advance	46.22
10	Henk Kamerbeek	Netherlands	46.02	Did not advance	46.02
11	Malcolm Nokes	Great Britain	45.37	Did not advance	45.37
12	Kenneth Caskey	United States	44.80	Did not advance	44.80
13	Camillo Zemi	Italy	44.47	Did not advance	44.47
14	Carl Johan Lind	Sweden	44.46	Did not advance	44.46
15	Yoshio Okita	Japan	44.41	Did not advance	44.41
16	Harald Stenerud	Norway	41.06	Did not advance	41.06
