= Athletics at the 1932 Summer Olympics – Men's hammer throw =

Olympic athletics event

Men's hammer throw at the Games of the X Olympiad
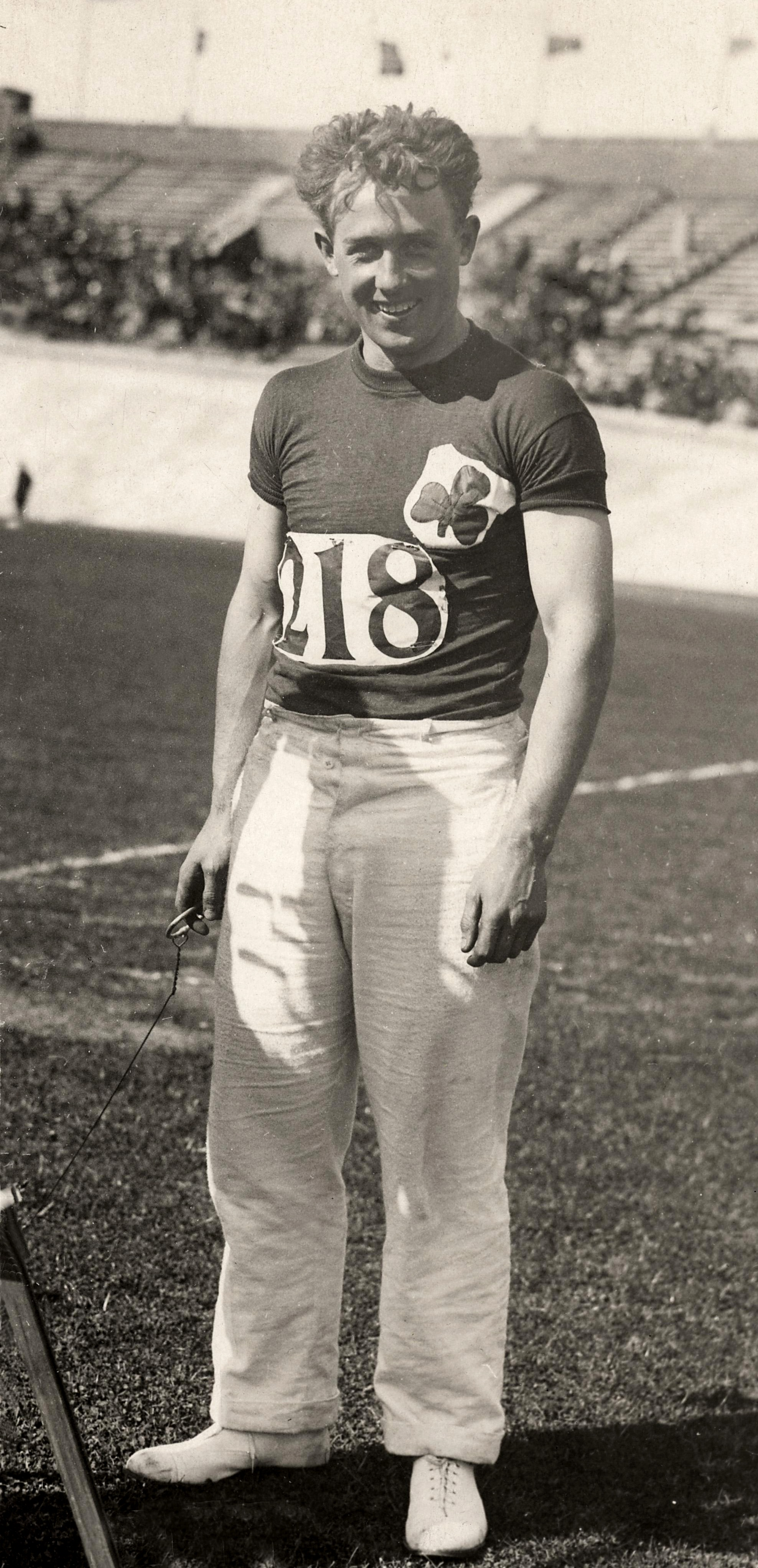
- Pat O'Callaghan (1928)
- Venue: Los Angeles Memorial Coliseum
- Date: August 1, 1932
- Competitors: 14 from 9 nations
- Winning distance: 53.92

Medalists
1st place, gold medalist(s)		Pat O'Callaghan; Ireland
2nd place, silver medalist(s)		Ville Pörhölä; Finland
3rd place, bronze medalist(s)		Pete Zaremba; United States

The men's hammer throw event at the 1932 Olympic Games took place August 1. There were 14 competitors from 9 nations. The 1930 Olympic Congress in Berlin had reduced the limit from 4 athletes per NOC to 3 athletes. The event was won by Pat O'Callaghan of Ireland, repeating as Olympic champion. O'Callaghan was the third man to win multiple hammer throw medals and the second (after three-time champion John Flanagan) to repeat as gold medalist. His victory also made 7 of the first 8 Olympic hammer throw competitions won by Irish-born athletes; in addition to O'Callaghan's two victories for Ireland, five of the United States' wins were by Irish-American throwers. Ville Pörhölä took silver for Finland's first medal in the event. Peter Zaremba extended the United States' medal streak to eight Games with his bronze.

== Background ==
This was the eighth appearance of the event, which has been held at every Summer Olympics except 1896. Four of the six finalists from the 1928 Games returned: gold medalist Pat O'Callaghan of Ireland, silver medalist Ossian Skiöld of Sweden, fourth-place finisher Armando Poggioli of Italy, and sixth-place finisher Frank Conner of the United States. Another prominent competitor was Ville Pörhölä of Finland, the 1920 shot put gold medalist. Pörhölä and O'Callaghan were the favorites.

Mexico made its debut in the event. The United States appeared for the eighth time, the only nation to have competed at each appearance of the event to that point.

== Competition format ==
The competition continued to use the divided-final format used since 1908, with results carrying over between "rounds". Each athlete received three throws in the qualifying round. The top six men advanced to the final, where they received an additional three throws. The best result, qualifying or final, counted.

== Records ==
These were the standing world and Olympic records (in metres) prior to the 1932 Summer Olympics.

World record	Patrick Ryan (USA)	57.77	New York City, United States	17 August 1913
Olympic record	Matt McGrath (USA)	54.74	Stockholm, Sweden	14 July 1912

No new world or Olympic records were set during the competition.

== Schedule ==
Date	Time	Round
Monday, 1 August 1932	14:30	Qualifying; Final

== Results ==
Rank	Athlete	Nation	1	2	3	4	5	6	Distance
1st place, gold medalist(s)	Pat O'Callaghan	Ireland	47.76	52.21	50.87	51.81	51.85	53.92	53.92
2nd place, silver medalist(s)	Ville Pörhölä	Finland	51.27	52.27	X	X	50.86	51.76	52.27
3rd place, bronze medalist(s)	Peter Zaremba	United States	50.33	47.67	50.16	X	X	X	50.33
4	Ossian Skiöld	Sweden	49.25	47.95	48.39	47.84	48.08	48.75	49.25
5	Grant McDougall	United States	48.36	49.02	X	49.12	X	48.79	49.12
6	Federico Kleger	Argentina	42.57	45.77	48.33	X	X	47.79	48.33
7	Gunnar Jansson	Sweden	47.33	X	47.79	did not advance			47.79
8	Armando Poggioli	Italy	44.25	45.47	46.90	did not advance			46.90
9	Fernando Vandelli	Italy	X	43.42	45.16	did not advance			45.16
10	Yuji Nagao	Japan	43.41	X	X	did not advance			43.41
11	Francisco Dávila	Mexico	37.07	41.61	X	did not advance			41.61
12	Masayoshi Ochiai	Japan	X	38.70	41.00	did not advance			41.00
13	Carmine Giorgi	Brazil	35.49	36.45	X	did not advance			36.45
—	Frank Conner	United States	X	X	X	did not advance			NM
