= Jaroslav Eliáš =

Czech athlete

Personal information
- Born: 14 January 1906 Chotutice, Bohemia, Austria-Hungary
- Died: 1 March 1962 (aged 56) Prague, Czechoslovakia

Sport
- Sport: Athletics
- Event: Hammer throw

Jaroslav Eliáš (14 January 1906 – 1 March 1962) was a Czech hammer thrower. He competed for Czechoslovakia in the men's hammer throw at the 1936 Summer Olympics.

Eliáš finished 10th in the hammer throw at the 1934 European Athletics Championships. He won the 1945 Czechoslovak Athletics Championships hammer throw with a mark of 44.50 m and placed at 12 other high-level Czech athletics championships.

Eliáš competed for the Slavia Praha athletics club.
