= Goth culture =

Goth culture may refer to:

- Goths § Culture
- Goth subculture

== See also ==
- Goth (disambiguation)
- Gothic religion (disambiguation)
