= Fernando Vandelli =

Italian hammer thrower (1907–1977)

Personal information
- Nationality: Italian
- Born: 5 April 1907 Modena, Italy
- Died: 13 July 1977 (aged 70) Modena, Italy
- Height: 170 cm (5 ft 7 in)
- Weight: 80 kg (176 lb)

Sport
- Country: Italy
- Sport: Athletics
- Event: Hammer throw
- Club: La Fratell
Medal record
Men's athletics
Representing Italy
European Championships
Silver medal – second place	1934 Turin	Hammer throw

Fernando Giuseppe Maria Vandelli (5 April 1907 – 13 July 1977) was an Italian hammer thrower who competed at the 1932 Summer Olympics.

== Biography ==
Vandelli finished third behind Ossian Skiöld in the hammer throw event at the British 1931 AAA Championships.

At the 1932 Olympic Games in Los Angeles, he finished in 9th place men's hammer throw. He won a silver medal at the 1934 European Championships.

Vandelli won four national championships at individual senior level.

- Italian Athletics Championships
  - Hammer throw: 1931, 1932, 1933, 1934
