= Peter Zaremba =

Peter Zaremba may refer to:

- Peter Zaremba (musician), lead singer of The Fleshtones
- Peter Zaremba (hammer thrower) (1908–1994), American Olympic athlete
