= 1934 European Athletics Championships – Men's hammer throw =

Men's hammer throw at the European Athletics Championships

The men's hammer throw at the 1934 European Athletics Championships was held in Turin, Italy, at the Stadio Benito Mussolini on 8 September 1934.

== Medalists ==
Gold	Ville Pörhölä; Finland
Silver	Fernando Vandelli; Italy
Bronze	Gunnar Jansson; Sweden

== Results ==
=== Final ===
8 September

Rank	Name	Nationality	Result	Notes
1st place, gold medalist(s)	Ville Pörhölä	Finland	50.34	CR
2nd place, silver medalist(s)	Fernando Vandelli	Italy	48.69	
3rd place, bronze medalist(s)	Gunnar Jansson	Sweden	47.85	
4	Ossian Skiöld	Sweden	47.42	
5	Sulo Pärni	Finland	46.83	
6	Armando Poggioli	Italy	46.57	
7	Koit Annamaa	Estonia	45.42	
8	Rudolf Seeger	Germany	44.52	
9	Petar Goic	Yugoslavia	44.03	
10	Jaroslav Eliás	Czechoslovakia	41.85	
11	Jaroslav Knotek	Czechoslovakia	39.58	

== Participation ==
According to an unofficial count, 11 athletes from 7 countries participated in the event.

- Czechoslovakia (2)
- Estonia (1)
- Finland (2)
- Germany (1)
- Italy (2)
- Sweden (2)
- Yugoslavia (1)
