= Gothic religion =

Gothic religion may refer to:

- Gothic paganism
- Gothic Christianity

== See also ==
- Gothic (disambiguation)
- Goth culture (disambiguation)
