= Götz =

Götz or Goetz (German pronunciation: [ɡœts]) is a German name, in origin a hypocorism of Gottfried. It remains in use as a short form of Gottfried, but it has also become a surname.

== Surnames ==
Goetz

- Alphonse Goetz (1865-1934), French chess master
- Arturo Goetz (1844-1914), Argentine actor
- Benjamin Eliakim Goetz (died 1798), English rabbi
- Bernhard Goetz, New York City's "subway vigilante"
- Curt Goetz, Swiss-German writer and actor
- E. Ray Goetz, an American composer, lyricist, and theatrical producer
- Eric Goetz, yacht builder
- Henri Goetz, the French-American Surrealist painter and etcher
- Hermann Goetz, German composer
- Hermann Goetz (art historian), German scholar and museum director
- Hermann Götz (politician) (1914–1987), German politician
- Jaden Goetz, Canadian actor
- James B. Goetz, American politician
- John Goetz, baseball player
- Judith Goetz (born 1983), Austrian literature and political science scholar
- Kimi Goetz (born 1994), American speed skater
- Leo Goetz, German painter
- Louise Götz, actress
- Magdalena Żernicka-Goetz, Polish biologist
- Meg Goetz, the first woman reading clerk of the U.S. House of Representatives
- Peter Michael Goetz, actor
- Ruth Goetz, American playwright, screenwriter, and translator
- Ruth Goetz (German screenwriter), German screenwriter
- William Goetz, the American film producer

Götz

- Franz Götz, multiple people
- Hans Götz (1919–1943), German fighter pilot
- Johann Nikolaus Götz (1721–1781), German religious figure, writer and translator
- Karl Otto Götz (1914–2017), German artist
- Leon Götz (1892–1970), New Zealand politician
- Maximilian Götz (born 1986), German racing driver
- Paul Götz, German astronomer
- Rainald Götz, German writer
- Ralph Götz, president of the German Rugby Federation
- Simone Götz (born 1969), Swiss politician and oenologist

== Given name ==
Götz
- Pronunciation: [ɡœts]
- Gender: Male
- Language: German

Origin
- Region of origin: Germany

Other names
- Derived: Gottfried

- Götz von Berlichingen (Gottfried von Berlichingen, 1480–1562), Franconian mercenary and poet
- Götz Briefs (Gottfried Anton Briefs, 1889–1974), German Catholic social ethicist, social philosopher, and political economist
- Götz Friedrich (1930–2000), German film and theater director
- Götz George (1938–2016), German actor
- Götz Werner (1944–2022), German businessman
- Götz Aly (b. 1947), German journalist and historian
- Götz Alsmann (b. 1957), German musician and entertainer
- Götz Spielmann (b. 1961), Austrian film director
- Götz Otto (b. 1967), German actor
- Götz Kubitschek (born 1970), German political activist

== See also ==
- Goetz Collection, Munich
- Goetz, Wisconsin, a small town
- Goethe (surname)
- Götz (company), a German doll manufacturer
