= Fahlcrantz =

Fahlcrantz is a Swedish surname. Notable people with the name include:

- Carl Johan Fahlcrantz (1774–1861), Swedish painter
- Christian Eric Fahlcrantz (1780–1866), Swedish theologian and author
- Greta Fahlcrantz (1889–1978), Swedish painter and sculptor
