= Kenneth Caskey =

American hammer thrower

Personal information
- Born: June 23, 1904 Port Jervis, United States
- Died: April 29, 1993 (aged 88) Harrisburg, United States

Sport
- Sport: Athletics
- Event: Hammer throw

Kenneth Caskey (June 23, 1904 – April 29, 1993) was an American athlete. He competed in the men's hammer throw at the 1928 Summer Olympics.
