= Masayoshi Ochiai =

Japanese hammer thrower

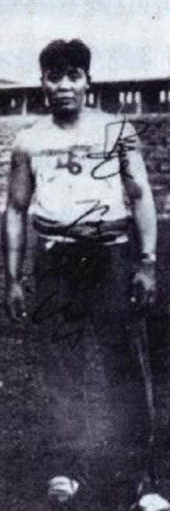

Personal information
- Nationality: Japanese
- Born: 3 June 1910 Shimane, Japan
- Died: December 1939 (aged 29)

Sport
- Sport: Athletics
- Event: Hammer throw

Masayoshi Ochiai (3 June 1910 – December 1939) was a Japanese track and field athlete. He competed in the men's hammer throw at the 1932 Summer Olympics. He was killed in action during World War II.
