= Yuji Nagao =

Japanese hammer thrower

Personal information
- Nationality: Japanese
- Born: 27 May 1907 Aomori, Japan

Sport
- Sport: Athletics
- Event: Hammer throw

Yuji Nagao (born 27 May 1907, date of death unknown) was a Japanese track and field athlete. He competed in the men's hammer throw at the 1932 Summer Olympics.
