= Carmine Giorgi =

Brazilian hammer thrower

Personal information
- Born: 16 October 1910 São Paulo, Brazil
- Died: 1 February 1965 (aged 54)

Sport
- Sport: Athletics
- Event: Hammer throw

Carmine Giorgi (16 October 1910 – 1 February 1965) was a Brazilian athlete. He competed in the men's hammer throw at the 1932 Summer Olympics.
