= Märtha Gahn =

Swedish textile artist

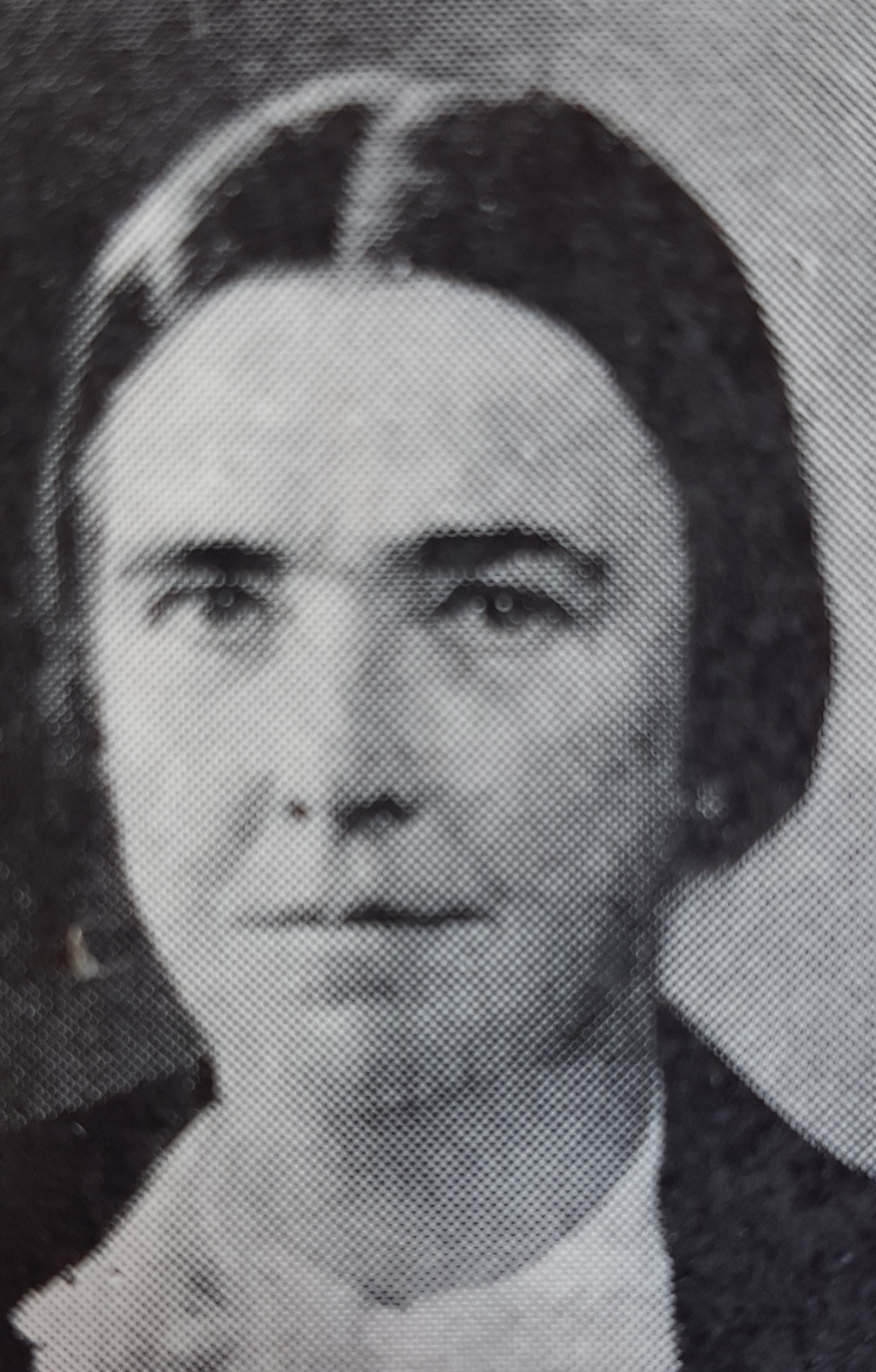
Märtha Fredrique Gahn

Märtha Fredrique Gahn (Fellingsbro, 30 September 1881 – 17 October 1973) was a Swedish textile artist. Together with Elsa Flensburg, Bror Geijer Göthe and Märtha Hjortzberg-Reuterswärd, she was one of the founders of the "Ateljé Handtryck" textile workshop in 1915. In 1935 she became head of the Libraria studio, which produced ecclesiastical textiles for the Church of Sweden. Gahn's work may be found in the collections of the Nationalmuseum the Röhsska Museum, and the Nordic Museum.

A portrait of Gahn by Greta Fahlcrantz is currently in the portrait collection of Gripsholm Castle.
