= 1931 AAA Championships =

Outdoor track and field competition

- Dates: 3–4 July 1931
- Host city: London, England
- Venue: Stamford Bridge
- Level: Senior
- Type: Outdoor
- Events: 24

The 1931 AAA Championships was the 1931 edition of the annual outdoor track and field competition organised by the Amateur Athletic Association (AAA). It was held from 3 to 4 July 1931 at Stamford Bridge in London, England.

After 19 consecutive years at Stamford Bridge, it would be the last time that the venue hosted the championships. The Championships consisted of 24 events and covered two days of competition. The marathon was held from Windsor to Stamford Bridge.

The steeplechase event saw the number of hurdles standardised and the pole jump was renamed the pole vault.

== Results ==
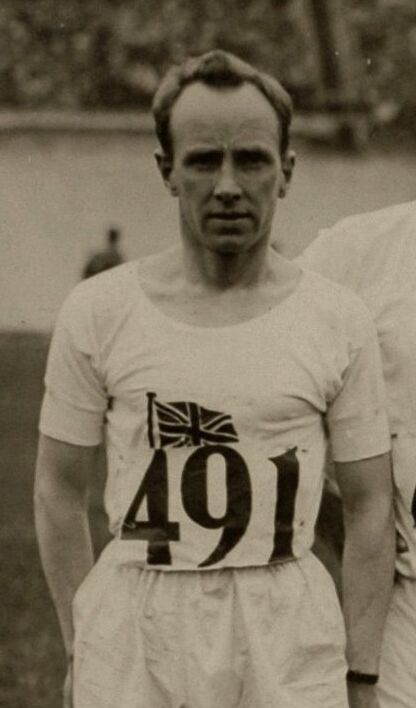
Scotsman Dunky Wright retained his marathon title

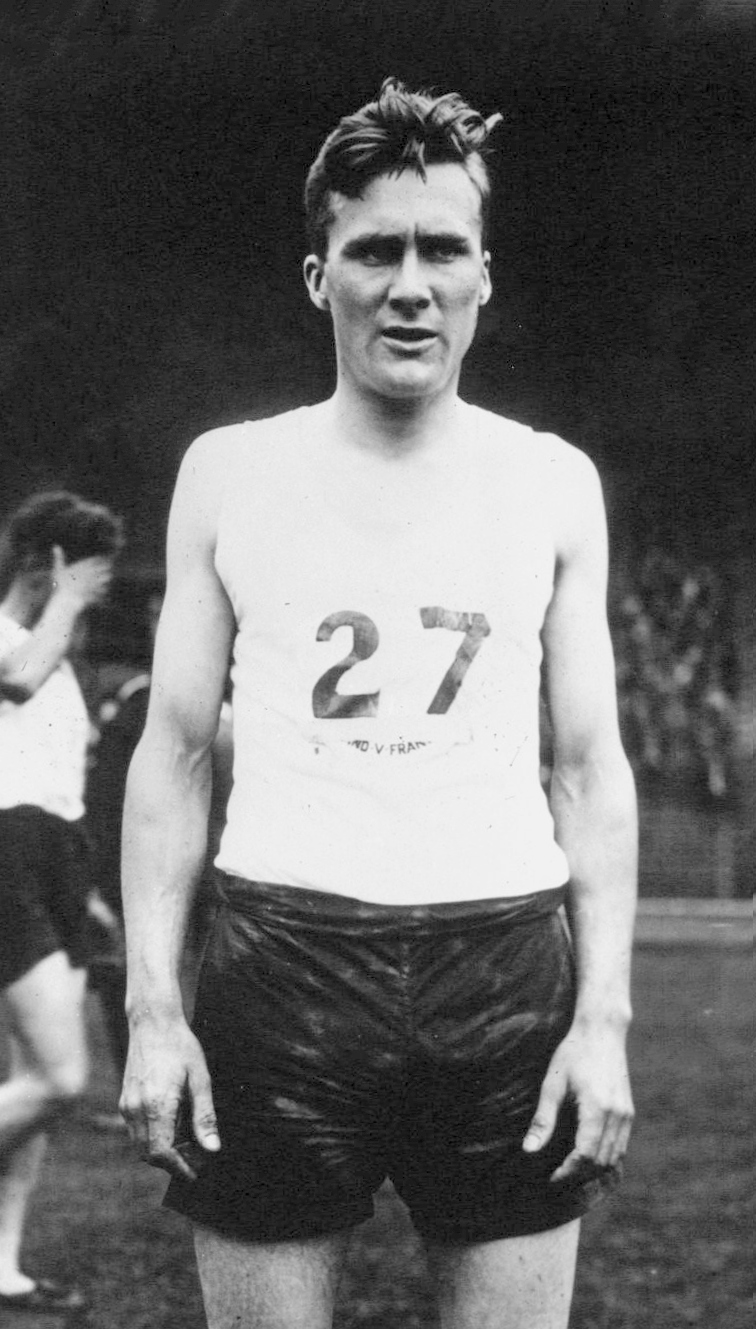
Tom Evenson won the steeplechase

Event	Gold		Silver		Bronze	
100 yards	Ernie Page	10.0	(Scotland) Fred Reid	inches	(Italy) Edgardo Toetti	inches
220 yards	(Scotland) Robin Murdoch	22.5	John Hanlon	inches	(Czechoslovakia) Andrej Engel	
440 yards	Godfrey Rampling	48.6	(Hungary) Laszlo Barsi	49.6	(Austria) Felix Rinner	50.0
880 yards	Tommy Hampson	1:54.8	Stuart Townend	1:56.4	(Germany) Otto Peltzer	1:56.7
1 mile	(Wales) Reg Thomas	4:16.4	Cyril Ellis	4:20.6	(Norway) Reidar Jørgensen	4:21.0
4 miles	Alec Burns	19:49.4	(Scotland) James Wood	20:00.0	(Scotland) Robert Sutherland	20:07.4
10 miles	Jack Winfield	54:34.4	Thomas Evenson	54:41.4	John Potts	54:48.4
marathon	(Scotland) Dunky Wright	2:49:54.2	Stan Smith	2:50:09.4	Henry Clarke	2:54:06.4
steeplechase	Thomas Evenson	10:36.4	George Bailey	10:39.0	Sidney Binfield	
120y hurdles	Lord Burghley	14.8	Donald Finlay	½ yd	(Norway) Holger Albrechtsen	1 ft
440y hurdles	(Italy) Luigi Facelli	54.4	(Sweden) Johan Areskoug	3-5 yd	Lord Burghley	1 yd
2 miles walk	Alf Pope	13:52.6	Bert Cooper	13:57.8	(Latvia) Janis Dalins	14:10.0
7 miles walk	(Italy) Ugo Frigerio	53:32.0	(Latvia) Janis Dalins	53:40.0	Alf Pope	54:09.0
high jump	Arthur Gray	1.829	(Guyana) Colin Gordon & Alec James (shared silver)			1.803
pole vault	(Sweden) Henry Lindblad	3.88	(Netherlands) Age van der Zee	3.81	Laurence Bond	3.66
long jump	(Netherlands) Hannes de Boer	7.21	(Italy) Arturo Maffei	7.06	(Netherlands) Anton van Welsenses	6.98
triple jump	(Netherlands) Jan Blankers	14.22	(Netherlands) Willem Peters	14.16	Harold Langley	13.43
shot put	(Hungary) József Daranyi	15.23	(Czechoslovakia) František Douda	15.16	Kenneth Pridie	13.46
discus throw	(Hungary) Endre Madarász	43.10	(Austria) Emil Janausch	42.30	Kenneth Pridie	38.74
hammer throw	(Sweden) Ossian Skiöld	51.36	(Sweden) Gunnar Jansson	48.83	(Italy) Fernando Vandelli	46.84
javelin throw	(Norway) Olav Sunde	60.76	(South Africa) Willem Hertzog	53.13	Stanley Wilson	53.03
440 yards relay	Achilles Club	43.3–5sec	Blackheath Harriers		Polytechnic Harriers	
Tug of war (100 st)	Royal Marines Portsmouth		Luton Borough Police		Willesden Loco; RN Barracks Chatham	
Tug of war (catch weight)	Royal Marines Portsmouth		London Fire Brigade			

== See also ==
- 1931 WAAA Championships
