= Edmund Black =

American hammer thrower

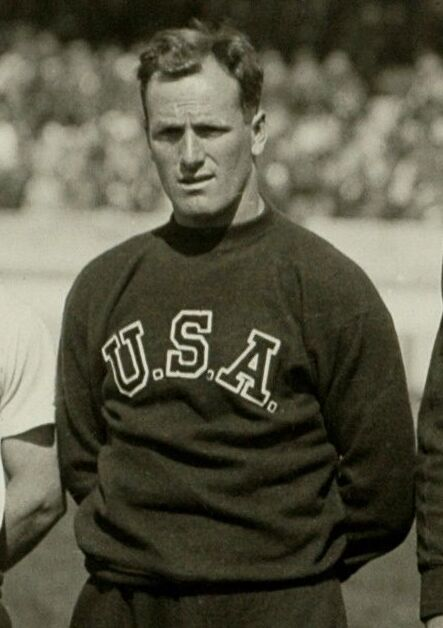

Medal record

Men's athletics

Representing the United States
Bronze medal – third place	1928 Amsterdam	Hammer throw

Edmund Franklin Black (May 3, 1905 – October 22, 1996) was an American athlete who competed mainly in the hammer throw.

He competed for the United States in the 1928 Summer Olympics held in Amsterdam, Netherlands in the hammer throw where he won the bronze medal.
