= Gothic =

Gothic or Gothics may refer to:

== People and languages ==
- Goths or Gothic people, a Germanic people
  - Gothic language, an extinct East Germanic language spoken by the Goths
  - Gothic alphabet, an alphabet used to write the Gothic language
  - Gothic (Unicode block)
- Geats, sometimes called Goths, a large North Germanic tribe who inhabited Götaland

== Arts and entertainment ==
=== Genres and styles ===
- Gothic art, a style of medieval art
- Gothic architecture, an architectural style
- Gothic fiction, a loose literary aesthetic of fear and haunting
- Gothic rock, a style of rock music
- Goth subculture, developed by fans of gothic rock

=== Gaming ===
- Gothic (series), a video game series
  - Gothic (video game), 2001
  - Gothic 1 Remake, 2026 remake of the 2001 video game

=== Music ===
- Symphony No. 1 (Brian), or "The Gothic", Havergal Brian
- Gothic (Paradise Lost album), 1991
- Gothic (Nox Arcana album), 2015

=== Other uses in arts and entertainment ===
- Gothic (film), a 1986 British psychological horror film
- Batman: Gothic, a 1990 comic book story arc
- "Gothic", a 2010 episode of TV series QI (Series G)

== Typography ==
- Blackletter, or Gothic script, Gothic minuscule or Gothic type (like $\mathfrak{Abcdefg}$)
- Sans-serif or Gothic typefaces (like Abcde)
  - East Asian Gothic typeface, the "sans-serif" equivalent for East Asian writing systems

== Other uses ==
- Gothic, Colorado, U.S., a ghost town
- Gothic F.C., a football club in Norwich, England
- Gothic (moth), a species of nocturnal moth
- Gothics, a mountain in the Great Range of the Adirondacks in New York state, U.S.
- SS Gothic, the name of several steamships

== See also ==
- Goth (disambiguation)
- Gothic Line, a World War II defensive line
- Gothic plate armour, in the 15th century
- Gothic Revival architecture, or neo-Gothic
- Gothic script (disambiguation)
- Gothic War (disambiguation)
- New Gothic, a contemporary art movement
