= Ville Pörhölä =

Athletics competitor (1897–1964)

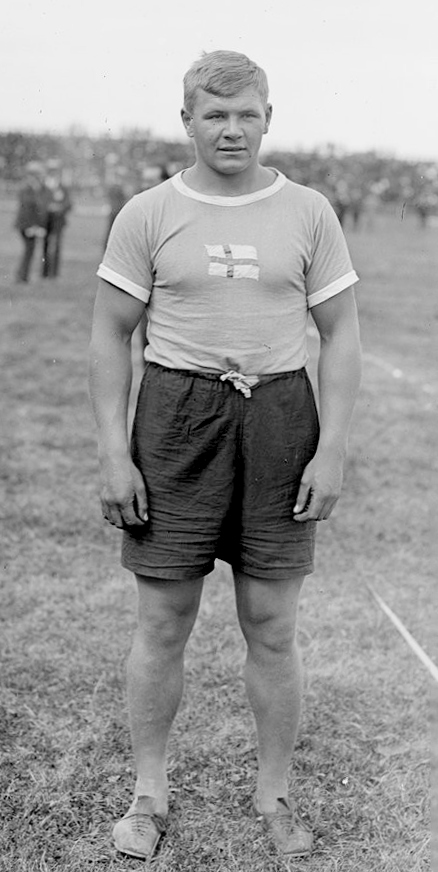
- Ville Pörhölä in 1920

Personal information
- Full name: Frans Wilhelm Pörhölä
- Born: 24 December 1897 Alatornio, Finland
- Died: 28 November 1964 (aged 66) Oulu, Finland
- Height: 1.82 m (6 ft 0 in)
- Weight: 90–105 kg (198–231 lb)

Sport
- Sport: Athletics
- Events: Shot put, discus throw, hammer throw
- Club: Oulun Pyrintö, Oulu; Kuopion Urheilu-Veikot, Kuopio; Kajaanin Kipinä, Kajaani

Achievements and titles
- Personal bests: SP – 14.87 m (1925); DT – 41.48 m (1920); HT – 53.77 m (1931)
Medal record
Men's athletics
Representing Finland
Olympic Games
Gold medal – first place	1920 Antwerp	Shot put
Silver medal – second place	1932 Los Angeles	Hammer throw
European Championships
Gold medal – first place	1934 Turin	Hammer throw

Frans Wilhelm "Ville" Pörhölä (originally Horneman, 24 December 1897 – 28 November 1964) was a Finnish athlete who competed in shot put, discus throw, hammer throw and weight throw.

== Biography ==
Pörhölä won the gold medal in shot put at the 1920 Summer Olympics. He also competed in discus throw, finishing eighth, and in weight throw, where he finished ninth. He later focused on work, leaving his sports career behind. He re-emerged on the sports scene as a hammer thrower in 1929, and later won Olympic silver in 1932 and European champion in 1934. At his last Olympics in 1936, he finished 11th.

Nationally, Pörhölä won eight Finnish titles: in standing triple jump in 1922, in shot put in 1929–31, and in hammer throw in 1934–35. He also won the British AAA Championships title in the triple jump event at the 1922 AAA Championships. His trademark was wearing a cap in competitions.

After retiring from competitions, Pörhölä worked for a large Finnish timber company, eventually becoming its managing director. He also served as president of the Sports Federation of Lapland in 1946–50.

Pörhölä originated from the island of Röyttä, near Tornio, and was known in Finland as Röyttän karhu ("The Bear from Röyttä").
