= Vereinigung der Vertragsfußballspieler =

German professional footballer's union

- Abbreviation: VDV
- Founded: 15 June 1987; 39 years ago
- Headquarters: Gelsenkirchen, Germany
- Website: www.spielergewerkschaft.de

The Vereinigung der Vertragsfußballspieler e. V. (VDV) is the professional footballer's union in Germany. As of 2026, it has approximately 1400 members playing in the German professional leagues. Junior footballers at the beginning of their professional careers can also be members from the age of fifteen. Footballers who have been playing abroad or have retired can remain members.

== History ==
The union was founded on 15 June 1987 in Offenbach am Main by the former professional footballers Benno Möhlmann, Ewald Lienen and Frank Pagelsdorf, together with colleagues including Guido Buchwald, Florian Gothe, Charly Körbel and Bruno Labbadia. The goal of the union was to work in the interest of the players. Especially important at that time were work and contract conditions, the independence of players, and the democratisation of German professional football. In general, the goal is to give footballers a common voice towards clubs and associations.

== Presidents ==
- 1987–1992: Benno Möhlmann
- 1992–1994: Stefan Lottermann
- 1994–1996 Jürgen Rollmann
- 1996–1997 Benno Möhlmann (Note: Möhlmann was later named honorary president of the VDV.)
- 1997–1999: Jürgen Sparwasser
- 1999–present: Florian Gothe

== Awards ==
Voted by professional footballers in the union, the VDV Silver Boot is awarded to the best player of the season, the VDV Silver Arrow is awarded to the best newcomer of the season, while the VDV Silver Bench is awarded to the best coach of the season.

=== Silver Boot (Player of the Season) ===
==== 1998–2003 ====
Year	Player	Club	Ref.
1998	(Germany) Oliver Kahn	Bayern Munich	
1999	(Germany) Lothar Matthäus	Bayern Munich	
2000	(Germany) Mehmet Scholl	Bayern Munich	
2001	(Germany) Oliver Kahn	Bayern Munich	
2003	(Brazil) Giovane Élber	Bayern Munich	

==== 2006–present ====
Season	Player	Club	Ref.
2005–06	(Germany) Miroslav Klose	Werder Bremen	
2006–07	(Brazil) Diego	Werder Bremen	
2007–08	(France) Franck Ribéry	Bayern Munich	
2008–09	(Brazil) Grafite	VfL Wolfsburg	
2009–10	(Netherlands) Arjen Robben	Bayern Munich	
2010–11	(Turkey) Nuri Şahin	Borussia Dortmund	
2011–12	(Germany) Marco Reus	Borussia Mönchengladbach	
2012–13	(Poland) Robert Lewandowski	Borussia Dortmund	
2013–14	(Germany) Marco Reus	Borussia Dortmund	
2014–15	(Belgium) Kevin De Bruyne	VfL Wolfsburg	
2015–16	(Gabon) Pierre-Emerick Aubameyang	Borussia Dortmund	
2016–17	(Poland) Robert Lewandowski	Bayern Munich	
2017–18	(Poland) Robert Lewandowski	Bayern Munich	
2018–19	(Germany) Marco Reus	Borussia Dortmund	
2019–20	(Poland) Robert Lewandowski	Bayern Munich	
2020–21	(Poland) Robert Lewandowski	Bayern Munich	
2021–22	(France) Christopher Nkunku	RB Leipzig	
2022–23	(England) Jude Bellingham	Borussia Dortmund	
2023–24	(Germany) Florian Wirtz	Bayer Leverkusen	
2024–25	(Germany) Florian Wirtz	Bayer Leverkusen	
2025–26	(France) Michael Olise	Bayern Munich	

=== Silver Arrow (Newcomer of the Season) ===
Season	Player	Club	Ref.
2009–10	(Germany) Thomas Müller	Bayern Munich	
2010–11	(Germany) Mario Götze	Borussia Dortmund	
2011–12	(Austria) David Alaba	Bayern Munich	
2012–13	(Germany) Max Kruse	SC Freiburg	
2013–14	(Germany) André Hahn	FC Augsburg	
2014–15	(Germany) Leroy Sané	Schalke 04	
2015–16	(Germany) Julian Weigl	Borussia Dortmund	
2016–17	(France) Ousmane Dembélé	Borussia Dortmund	
2017–18	(Jamaica) Leon Bailey	Bayer Leverkusen	
2018–19	(England) Jadon Sancho	Borussia Dortmund	
2019–20	(Canada) Alphonso Davies	Bayern Munich	
2020–21	(England) Jude Bellingham	Borussia Dortmund	
2021–22	(Germany) Florian Wirtz	Bayer Leverkusen	
2022–23	(France) Randal Kolo Muani	Eintracht Frankfurt	
2023–24	(Germany) Deniz Undav	VfB Stuttgart	
2024–25	(Germany) Nick Woltemade	VfB Stuttgart	
2025–26	(Ivory Coast) Yan Diomande	RB Leipzig	

=== Silver Bench (Coach of the Season) ===
Season	Coach	Club	Ref.
2009–10	(Netherlands) Louis van Gaal	Bayern Munich	
2010–11	(Germany) Jürgen Klopp	Borussia Dortmund	
2011–12	(Switzerland) Lucien Favre	Borussia Mönchengladbach	
2012–13	(Germany) Jupp Heynckes	Bayern Munich	
2013–14	(Germany) Markus Weinzierl	FC Augsburg	
2014–15	(Germany) Dieter Hecking	VfL Wolfsburg	
2015–16	(Germany) Thomas Tuchel	Borussia Dortmund	
2016–17	(Germany) Julian Nagelsmann	TSG Hoffenheim	
2017–18	(Germany) Jupp Heynckes	Bayern Munich	
2018–19	(Austria) Adi Hütter	Eintracht Frankfurt	
2019–20	(Germany) Hansi Flick	Bayern Munich	
2020–21	(Austria) Adi Hütter	Eintracht Frankfurt	
2021–22	(Germany) Christian Streich	SC Freiburg	
2022–23	(Switzerland) Urs Fischer	Union Berlin	
2023–24	(Spain) Xabi Alonso	Bayer Leverkusen	
2024–25	(Denmark) Bo Henriksen	Mainz 05	
2025–26	(Belgium) Vincent Kompany	Bayern Munich	

=== Team of the Season ===
==== 2008–09 ====
Position	Player	Club
Goalkeeper	(Germany) Robert Enke	Hannover 96
Defenders	(Germany) Andreas Beck	TSG Hoffenheim
Defenders	(Brazil) Lúcio	Bayern Munich
Defenders	(Croatia) Josip Šimunić	Hertha BSC
Defenders	(Germany) Philipp Lahm	Bayern Munich
Midfielders	(Bosnia and Herzegovina) Zvjezdan Misimović	VfL Wolfsburg
Midfielders	(Brazil) Zé Roberto	Bayern Munich
Midfielders	(France) Franck Ribéry	Bayern Munich
Midfielders	(Brazil) Diego	Werder Bremen
Forwards	(Brazil) Grafite	VfL Wolfsburg
Forwards	(Germany) Mario Gómez	VfB Stuttgart

==== 2009–10 ====
Position	Player	Club
Goalkeeper	(Germany) Manuel Neuer	Schalke 04
Defenders	(Germany) Philipp Lahm	Bayern Munich
Defenders	(Finland) Sami Hyypiä	Bayer Leverkusen
Defenders	(Germany) Mats Hummels	Borussia Dortmund
Defenders	(Germany) Dennis Aogo	Hamburger SV
Midfielders	(Netherlands) Arjen Robben	Bayern Munich
Midfielders	(Germany) Bastian Schweinsteiger	Bayern Munich
Midfielders	(Germany) Toni Kroos	Bayern Munich
Midfielders	(Germany) Thomas Müller	Bayern Munich
Forwards	(Bosnia and Herzegovina) Edin Džeko	VfL Wolfsburg
Forwards	(Germany) Stefan Kießling	Bayer Leverkusen

==== 2010–11 ====
Position	Player	Club
Goalkeeper	(Germany) Manuel Neuer	Schalke 04
Defenders	(Germany) Philipp Lahm	Bayern Munich
Defenders	(Serbia) Neven Subotić	Borussia Dortmund
Defenders	(Germany) Mats Hummels	Borussia Dortmund
Defenders	(Germany) Marcel Schmelzer	Borussia Dortmund
Midfielders	(Netherlands) Arjen Robben	Bayern Munich
Midfielders	(Turkey) Nuri Şahin	Borussia Dortmund
Midfielders	(Chile) Arturo Vidal	Bayer Leverkusen
Midfielders	(Germany) Mario Götze	Borussia Dortmund
Forwards	(Senegal) Papiss Cissé	SC Freiburg
Forwards	(Germany) Mario Gómez	Bayern Munich

==== 2011–12 ====
Position	Player	Club
Goalkeeper	(Germany) Marc-André ter Stegen	Borussia Mönchengladbach
Defenders	(Poland) Łukasz Piszczek	Borussia Dortmund
Defenders	(Brazil) Dante	Borussia Mönchengladbach
Defenders	(Germany) Mats Hummels	Borussia Dortmund
Defenders	(Germany) Philipp Lahm	Bayern Munich
Midfielders	(Germany) Marco Reus	Borussia Mönchengladbach
Midfielders	(Austria) David Alaba	Bayern Munich
Midfielders	(France) Franck Ribéry	Bayern Munich
Midfielders	(Japan) Shinji Kagawa	Borussia Dortmund
Forwards	(Germany) Mario Gómez	Bayern Munich
Forwards	(Netherlands) Klaas-Jan Huntelaar	Schalke 04

==== 2012–13 ====
Position	Player	Club
Goalkeeper	(Germany) Manuel Neuer	Bayern Munich
Defenders	(Germany) Philipp Lahm	Bayern Munich
Defenders	(Germany) Mats Hummels	Borussia Dortmund
Defenders	(Brazil) Dante	Bayern Munich
Defenders	(Austria) David Alaba	Bayern Munich
Midfielders	(Germany) Mario Götze	Borussia Dortmund
Midfielders	(Germany) Bastian Schweinsteiger	Bayern Munich
Midfielders	(Germany) İlkay Gündoğan	Borussia Dortmund
Midfielders	(France) Franck Ribéry	Bayern Munich
Forwards	(Croatia) Mario Mandžukić	Bayern Munich
Forwards	(Poland) Robert Lewandowski	Borussia Dortmund

==== 2013–14 ====
Position	Player	Club
Goalkeeper	(Germany) Manuel Neuer	Bayern Munich
Defenders	(Germany) Philipp Lahm	Bayern Munich
Defenders	(Germany) Mats Hummels	Borussia Dortmund
Defenders	(Brazil) Dante	Bayern Munich
Defenders	(Austria) David Alaba	Bayern Munich
Midfielders	(Netherlands) Arjen Robben	Bayern Munich
Midfielders	(Spain) Thiago	Bayern Munich
Midfielders	(France) Franck Ribéry	Bayern Munich
Midfielders	(Germany) Marco Reus	Borussia Dortmund
Forwards	(Croatia) Mario Mandžukić	Bayern Munich
Forwards	(Poland) Robert Lewandowski	Borussia Dortmund

==== 2014–15 ====
Position	Player	Club
Goalkeeper	(Germany) Manuel Neuer	Bayern Munich
Defenders	(Portugal) Vieirinha	VfL Wolfsburg
Defenders	(Brazil) Naldo	VfL Wolfsburg
Defenders	(Germany) Jérôme Boateng	Bayern Munich
Defenders	(Spain) Juan Bernat	Bayern Munich
Midfielders	(Netherlands) Arjen Robben	Bayern Munich
Midfielders	(Switzerland) Granit Xhaka	Borussia Mönchengladbach
Midfielders	(Austria) David Alaba	Bayern Munich
Midfielders	(Belgium) Kevin De Bruyne	VfL Wolfsburg
Forwards	(Germany) Alexander Meier	Eintracht Frankfurt
Forwards	(Poland) Robert Lewandowski	Bayern Munich

==== 2015–16 ====
Position	Player	Club
Goalkeeper	(Germany) Manuel Neuer	Bayern Munich
Defenders	(Germany) Philipp Lahm	Bayern Munich
Defenders	(Germany) Mats Hummels	Borussia Dortmund
Defenders	(Germany) Jérôme Boateng	Bayern Munich
Defenders	(Austria) David Alaba	Bayern Munich
Midfielders	(Armenia) Henrikh Mkhitaryan	Borussia Dortmund
Midfielders	(Chile) Arturo Vidal	Bayern Munich
Midfielders	(Brazil) Douglas Costa	Bayern Munich
Midfielders	(Germany) Thomas Müller	Bayern Munich
Forwards	(Gabon) Pierre-Emerick Aubameyang	Borussia Dortmund
Forwards	(Poland) Robert Lewandowski	Bayern Munich

==== 2016–17 ====
Position	Player	Club
Goalkeeper	(Germany) Manuel Neuer	Bayern Munich
Defenders	(Germany) Philipp Lahm	Bayern Munich
Defenders	(Germany) Mats Hummels	Bayern Munich
Defenders	(Germany) Niklas Süle	TSG Hoffenheim
Defenders	(Austria) David Alaba	Bayern Munich
Midfielders	(France) Ousmane Dembélé	Borussia Dortmund
Midfielders	(Spain) Thiago	Bayern Munich
Midfielders	(Sweden) Emil Forsberg	RB Leipzig
Midfielders	(Guinea) Naby Keïta	RB Leipzig
Forwards	(Gabon) Pierre-Emerick Aubameyang	Borussia Dortmund
Forwards	(Poland) Robert Lewandowski	Bayern Munich

==== 2017–18 ====
Position	Player	Club
Goalkeeper	(Germany) Sven Ulreich	Bayern Munich
Defenders	(Germany) Joshua Kimmich	Bayern Munich
Defenders	(Brazil) Naldo	Schalke 04
Defenders	(Germany) Mats Hummels	Bayern Munich
Defenders	(Germany) Philipp Max	FC Augsburg
Midfielders	(Colombia) James Rodríguez	Bayern Munich
Midfielders	(Guinea) Naby Keïta	RB Leipzig
Midfielders	(Spain) Javi Martínez	Bayern Munich
Midfielders	(Jamaica) Leon Bailey	Bayer Leverkusen
Forwards	(Germany) Thomas Müller	Bayern Munich
Forwards	(Poland) Robert Lewandowski	Bayern Munich

==== 2018–19 ====
Position	Player	Club
Goalkeeper	(Hungary) Péter Gulácsi	RB Leipzig
Defenders	(Germany) Joshua Kimmich	Bayern Munich
Defenders	(Japan) Makoto Hasebe	Eintracht Frankfurt
Defenders	(Germany) Niklas Süle	Bayern Munich
Defenders	(Germany) Nico Schulz	TSG Hoffenheim
Midfielders	(Belgium) Axel Witsel	Borussia Dortmund
Midfielders	(England) Jadon Sancho	Borussia Dortmund
Midfielders	(Germany) Marco Reus	Borussia Dortmund
Midfielders	(Germany) Kai Havertz	Bayer Leverkusen
Forwards	(Serbia) Luka Jović	Eintracht Frankfurt
Forwards	(Poland) Robert Lewandowski	Bayern Munich

==== 2019–20 ====
Position	Player	Club
Goalkeeper	(Germany) Manuel Neuer	Bayern Munich
Defenders	(Austria) David Alaba	Bayern Munich
Defenders	(Canada) Alphonso Davies	Bayern Munich
Defenders	(Germany) Mats Hummels	Borussia Dortmund
Defenders	(Morocco) Achraf Hakimi	Borussia Dortmund
Midfielders	(Germany) Kai Havertz	Bayer Leverkusen
Midfielders	(Germany) Joshua Kimmich	Bayern Munich
Midfielders	(England) Jadon Sancho	Borussia Dortmund
Forwards	(Norway) Erling Haaland	Borussia Dortmund
Forwards	(Poland) Robert Lewandowski	Bayern Munich
Forwards	(Germany) Timo Werner	RB Leipzig

==== 2020–21 ====
Position	Player	Club
Goalkeeper	(Germany) Manuel Neuer	Bayern Munich
Defenders	(Canada) Alphonso Davies	Bayern Munich
Defenders	(Austria) David Alaba	Bayern Munich
Defenders	(France) Dayot Upamecano	RB Leipzig
Defenders	(Germany) Mats Hummels	Borussia Dortmund
Midfielders	(Serbia) Filip Kostić	Eintracht Frankfurt
Midfielders	(Germany) Thomas Müller	Bayern Munich
Midfielders	(Germany) Joshua Kimmich	Bayern Munich
Midfielders	(Germany) Leon Goretzka	Bayern Munich
Forwards	(Poland) Robert Lewandowski	Bayern Munich
Forwards	(Norway) Erling Haaland	Borussia Dortmund

==== 2021–22 ====
Position	Player	Club
Goalkeeper	(Netherlands) Mark Flekken	SC Freiburg
Defenders	(Germany) David Raum	TSG Hoffenheim
Defenders	(Germany) Nico Schlotterbeck	SC Freiburg
Defenders	(Germany) Niklas Süle	Bayern Munich
Defenders	(Germany) Joshua Kimmich	Bayern Munich
Midfielders	(Czech Republic) Patrik Schick	Bayer Leverkusen
Midfielders	(England) Jude Bellingham	Borussia Dortmund
Midfielders	(France) Christopher Nkunku	RB Leipzig
Midfielders	(Germany) Florian Wirtz	Bayer Leverkusen
Forwards	(Poland) Robert Lewandowski	Bayern Munich
Forwards	(Norway) Erling Haaland	Borussia Dortmund

==== 2022–23 ====
Position	Player	Club
Goalkeeper	(Switzerland) Gregor Kobel	Borussia Dortmund
Defenders	(Croatia) Joško Gvardiol	RB Leipzig
Defenders	(Netherlands) Matthijs de Ligt	Bayern Munich
Defenders	(France) Dayot Upamecano	Bayern Munich
Defenders	(Netherlands) Jeremie Frimpong	Bayer Leverkusen
Midfielders	(Canada) Alphonso Davies	Bayern Munich
Midfielders	(Germany) Joshua Kimmich	Bayern Munich
Midfielders	(Germany) Jamal Musiala	Bayern Munich
Midfielders	(England) Jude Bellingham	Borussia Dortmund
Forwards	(France) Randal Kolo Muani	Eintracht Frankfurt
Forwards	(Germany) Niclas Füllkrug	Werder Bremen

==== 2023–24 ====
Position	Player	Club
Goalkeeper	(Switzerland) Gregor Kobel	Borussia Dortmund
Defenders	(Spain) Álex Grimaldo	Bayer Leverkusen
Defenders	(Germany) Jonathan Tah	Bayer Leverkusen
Defenders	(Germany) Waldemar Anton	VfB Stuttgart
Defenders	(Netherlands) Jeremie Frimpong	Bayer Leverkusen
Midfielders	(Germany) Jamal Musiala	Bayern Munich
Midfielders	(Switzerland) Granit Xhaka	Bayer Leverkusen
Midfielders	(Germany) Florian Wirtz	Bayer Leverkusen
Midfielders	(Netherlands) Xavi Simons	RB Leipzig
Forwards	(Guinea) Serhou Guirassy	VfB Stuttgart
Forwards	(England) Harry Kane	Bayern Munich

==== 2024–25 ====
Position	Player	Club
Goalkeeper	(Germany) Finn Dahmen	FC Augsburg
Defenders	(Germany) Nico Schlotterbeck	Borussia Dortmund
Defenders	(Germany) Jonathan Tah	Bayer Leverkusen
Defenders	(France) Dayot Upamecano	Bayern Munich
Defenders	(Germany) Joshua Kimmich	Bayern Munich
Midfielders	(Switzerland) Granit Xhaka	Bayer Leverkusen
Midfielders	(Germany) Jamal Musiala	Bayern Munich
Midfielders	(Germany) Florian Wirtz	Bayer Leverkusen
Midfielders	(Germany) Nadiem Amiri	Mainz 05
Forwards	(England) Harry Kane	Bayern Munich
Forwards	(France) Michael Olise	Bayern Munich

==== 2025–26 ====
Position	Player	Club
Goalkeeper	(Germany) Manuel Neuer	Bayern Munich
Defenders	(Germany) Nico Schlotterbeck	Borussia Dortmund
Defenders	(France) Dayot Upamecano	Bayern Munich
Defenders	(Germany) Jonathan Tah	Bayern Munich
Midfielders	(Spain) Álex Grimaldo	Bayer Leverkusen
Midfielders	(Germany) Joshua Kimmich	Bayern Munich
Midfielders	(Austria) Konrad Laimer	Bayern Munich
Forwards	(Colombia) Luis Díaz	Bayern Munich
Forwards	(Germany) Deniz Undav	VfB Stuttgart
Forwards	(France) Michael Olise	Bayern Munich
Forwards	(England) Harry Kane	Bayern Munich
