= Siegfried Bönighausen =

German footballer

Personal information
- Full name: Siegfried Bönighausen
- Date of birth: 20 March 1955 (age 71)
- Place of birth: Gladbeck, West Germany
- Height: 1.78 m (5 ft 10 in)
- Position: Midfielder

Youth career
- Bonner SC
- –1974: FC Schalke 04

Senior career*
Years	Team	Apps	(Gls)
1974–1976	FC Schalke 04 II		
1976–1980	Rot-Weiß Essen	114	(13)
1980–1983	Borussia Dortmund	44	(2)
1983–1987	VfL Bochum	48	(3)
- * Club domestic league appearances and goals

Siegfried Bönighausen (born 20 March 1955) is a retired German football midfielder.

== Career ==
=== Statistics ===
Club performance			League		Cup		Continental		Total	
Season	Club	League	Apps	Goals	Apps	Goals	Apps	Goals	Apps	Goals
West Germany			League		DFB-Pokal		Europe		Total	
1974–75	FC Schalke 04 II	Landesliga Westfalen			—		—			
1975–76	FC Schalke 04 II	Landesliga Westfalen			—		—			
1976–77	Rot-Weiß Essen	Bundesliga	25	1	5	1	—		30	2
1977–78	Rot-Weiß Essen	2. Bundesliga	33	4	3	0	—		36	4
1978–79	Rot-Weiß Essen	2. Bundesliga	31	6	1	0	—		32	6
1979–80	Rot-Weiß Essen	2. Bundesliga	25	2	2	0	—		27	2
1980–81	Borussia Dortmund	Bundesliga	1	0	0	0	—		1	0
1981–82	Borussia Dortmund	Bundesliga	11	0	1	0	—		12	0
1982–83	Borussia Dortmund	Bundesliga	32	2	3	0	2	0	37	2
1983–84	VfL Bochum	Bundesliga	32	3	1	0	—		33	3
1984–85	VfL Bochum	Bundesliga	16	0	1	0	—		17	0
1985–86	VfL Bochum	Bundesliga	0	0	0	0	—		0	0
1986–87	VfL Bochum	Bundesliga	0	0	0	0	—		0	0
Total	West Germany				17	1	2	0		
Career total					17	1	2	0		
