= Chotutice =

- Municipality
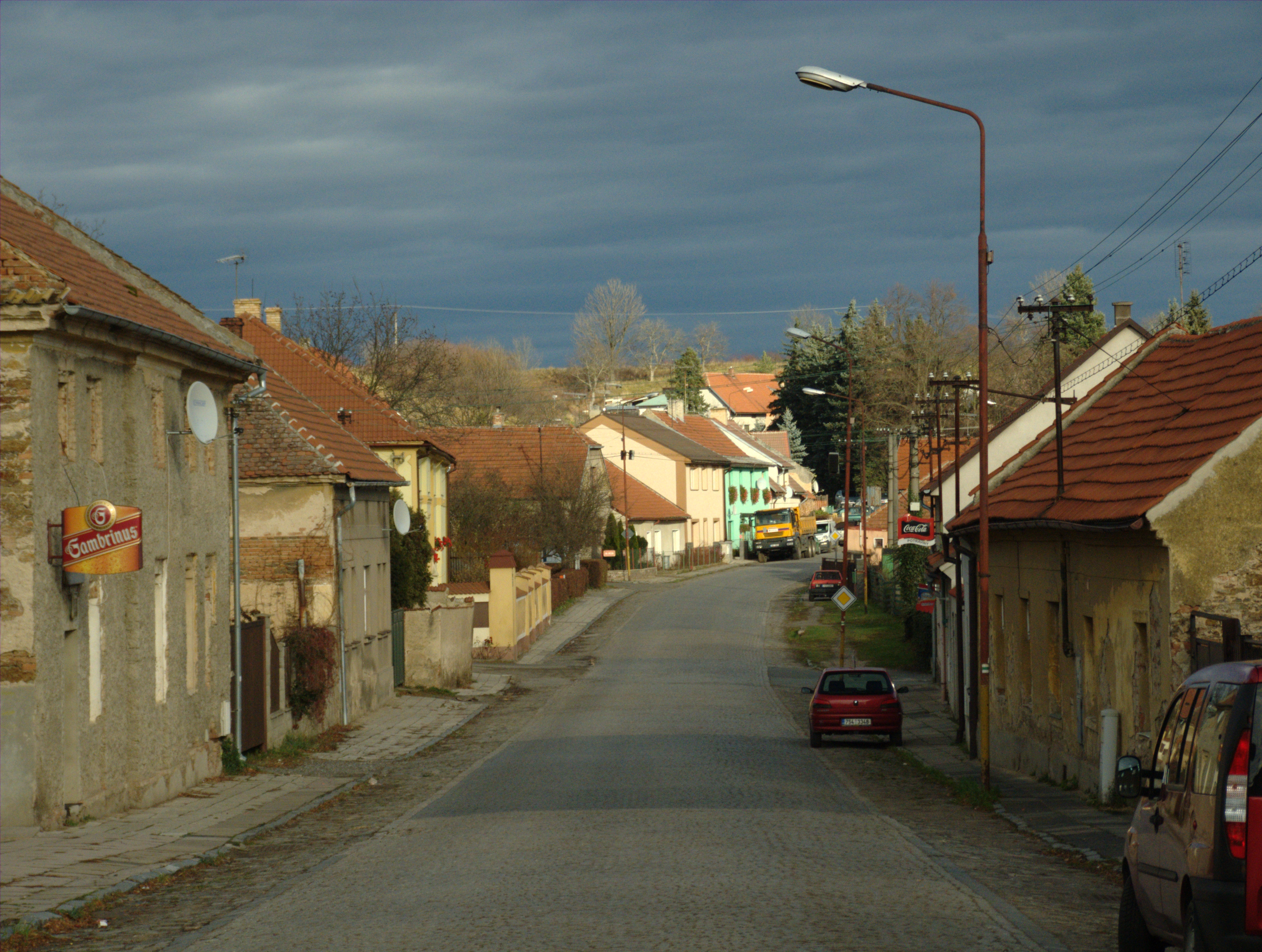
- Main street

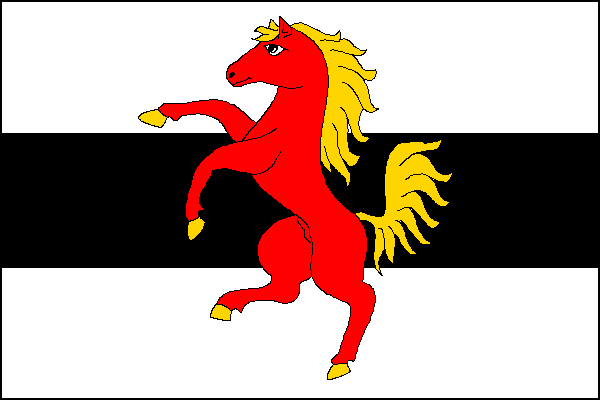
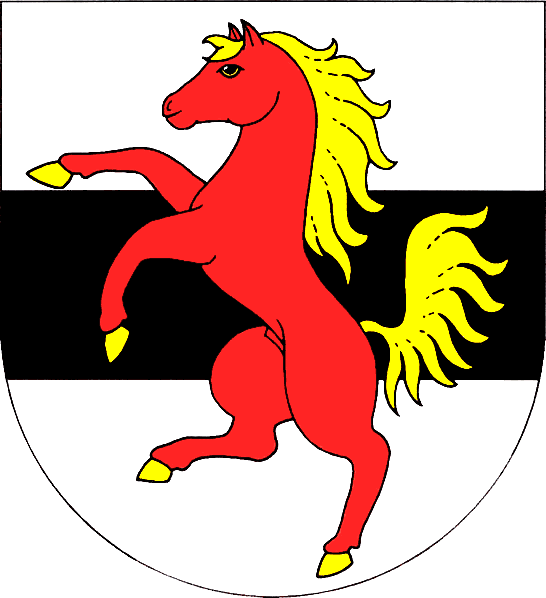
- Flag Coat of arms

- Location in the Czech Republic
- Coordinates: 50°4′12″N 14°59′24″E
- Country: Czech Republic
- Region: Central Bohemian
- District: Kolín
- First mentioned: 1100

Area
  - Total: 3.86 km^{2} (1.49 sq mi)
- Elevation: 207 m (679 ft)

Population (2026-01-01)
  - Total: 500
  - Density: 130/km^{2} (340/sq mi)
- Time zone: UTC+1 (CET)
  - Summer (DST): UTC+2 (CEST)
- Postal code: 281 03
- Website: www.chotutice.cz

Chotutice is a municipality and village in Kolín District in the Central Bohemian Region of the Czech Republic. It has about 500 inhabitants.

== History ==
The first written mention of Chotutice is from 1100.

== Demographics ==
Historical population
| Year | Pop. | ±% |
|---|---|---|
| 1869 | 655 | — |
| 1880 | 737 | +12.5% |
| 1890 | 775 | +5.2% |
| 1900 | 805 | +3.9% |
| 1910 | 836 | +3.9% |
| 1921 | 780 | −6.7% |
| 1930 | 687 | −11.9% |
| 1950 | 629 | −8.4% |
| 1961 | 642 | +2.1% |
| 1970 | 628 | −2.2% |
| 1980 | 579 | −7.8% |
| 1991 | 473 | −18.3% |
| 2001 | 448 | −5.3% |
| 2011 | 510 | +13.8% |
| 2021 | 491 | −3.7% |
Source: Censuses
