= Greta Fahlcrantz =

Swedish painter and sculptor

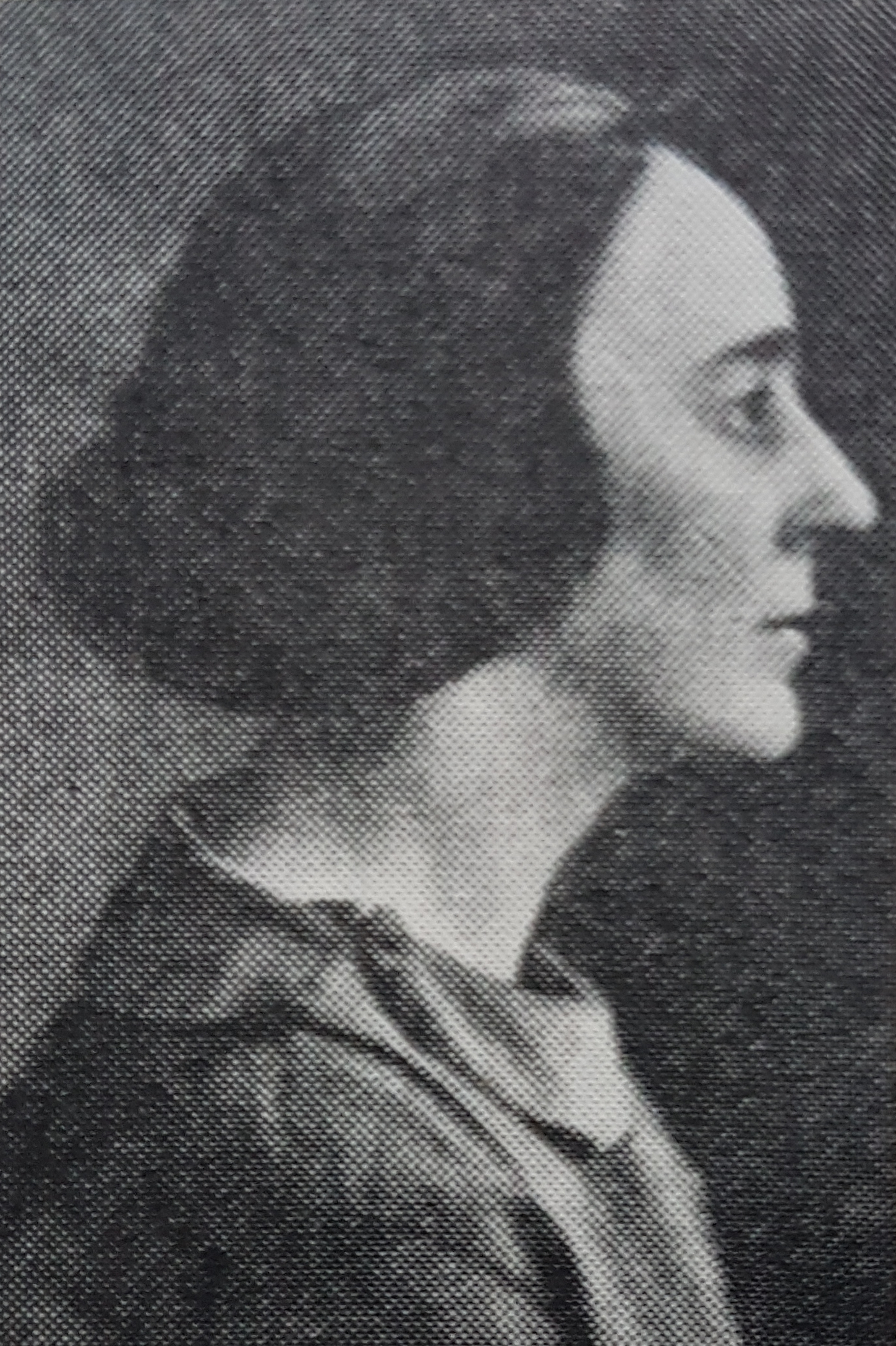
Greta Fahlcrantz

Greta Amalia Fahlcrantz Lindberg (Stockholm, April 3, 1889 – Stockholm, March 13, 1978) was a Swedish painter and sculptor.

Daughter of actor Herman Grip and Ada Fallstedt, Fahlcrantz studied with Carl Wilhelmson and married lawyer Hugo Fahlcrant in 1912. The marriage failed in 1919, the same year in which she began study with André Lhote. In 1921 she married the journalist Helge Lindberg, with whom she had three children. She lived in Uppsala and Gothenburg, and was active as a teacher as well as an artist. Eventually she moved back to Stockholm. During her career Fahlcrantz was active primarily as a portraitist, but she also modeled some busts, reliefs and other sculptural style molds during her career. She is represented in the collection of the Nationalmuseet.

A portrait by Fahlcrantz of Märtha Gahn, painted in 1920, is in the portrait collection of Gripsholm Castle.
