= Günter Habig =

German footballer

Personal information
- Full name: Günter Habig
- Date of birth: 7 December 1964 (age 61)
- Position: Forward

Senior career*
Years	Team	Apps	(Gls)
1983–1984	VfL Bochum	0	(0)
1984–1986	Alemannia Aachen	42	(3)
- * Club domestic league appearances and goals

Günter Habig (born 7 December 1964) is a retired German football forward. He is the son of Ernst-Günter Habig.
