= Erik Eriksson (athlete) =

Finnish hammer thrower (1897–1975)

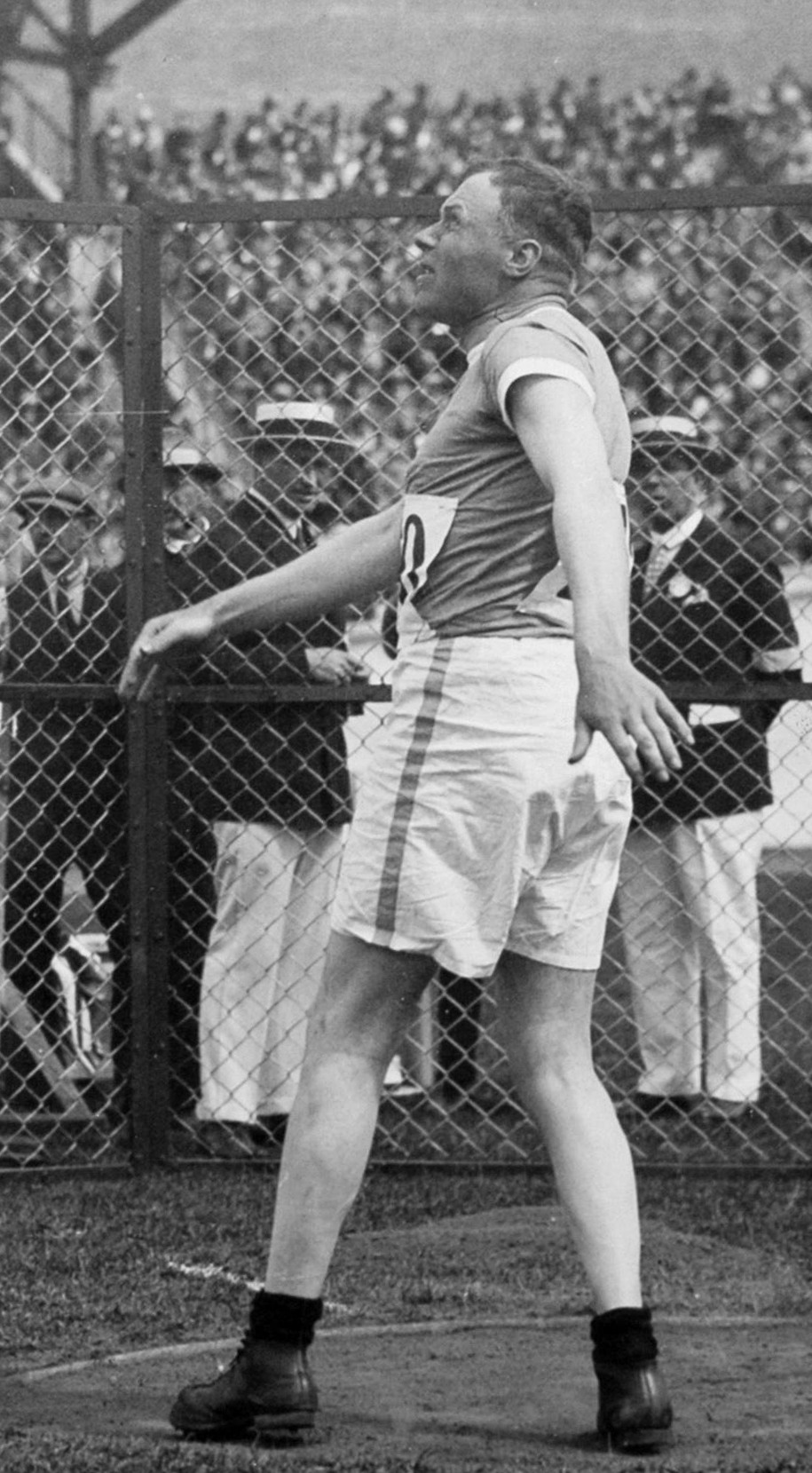
- Erik Eriksson at the 1928 Olympics

Personal information
- Born: 12 June 1897 Dragsfjärd, Finland
- Died: 21 May 1975 (aged 77) Helsinki, Finland
- Height: 1.86 m (6 ft 1 in)
- Weight: 83 kg (183 lb)

Sport
- Sport: Hammer throw
- Club: Kiffen, Helsinki

Achievements and titles
- Olympic finals: 1928

Erik Gideon Eriksson (12 June 1897 – 21 May 1975) was a Finnish hammer thrower. He competed at the 1924 and 1928 Olympics, finishing in fourth and ninth place, respectively. He achieved his personal best of a 50.36 m throw in 1931, but retired before the 1932 Olympics.
