= Judith Goetz =

Austrian literature and political science scholar (born 1983)

Judith Goetz (born June 10, 1983, in Vienna) is an Austrian literature and political science scholar, gender researcher, political illustrator and right-wing extremism expert.

== Life ==
Goetz studied Romance Studies, Comparative Literature and Political Science at the Klagenfurt, Vienna and Buenos Aires from 2001 to 2010. Her diploma thesis entitled "Books against Forgetting" was dedicated to Carinthian Slovenian literature on resistance and persecution in the context of Holocaust autobiography.

During her studies, Goetz was a consultant for feminist politics at the Federal Representation of the Austrian Students' Union. From 2012, she was a lecturer at the Graz, Klagenfurt, Salzburg and Vienna. In 2016/2017 she was a consultant for political education at the Green Education Workshop. From 2017 to 2021, Goetz was employed as a university assistant at the Chair of Didactics of Civic Education at the Center for Teacher Education at the University of Vienna, in 2022 she moved to the teaching and research area of social and extracurricular civic education at the Institute of Educational Science at the University of Innsbruck.

Her research focuses on feminist theory, gender-reflective perspectives on right-wing extremism, antifeminism, memorial politics, culture of remembrance and antisemitism. Among other things, she deals with girls' organizations, antifeminism among fraternities and the Turquoise-Blue Government, the gender images and policies of the Identitarians and the communication and media strategies of the Identitarians.

Goetz is a member of the editorial board of Context XXI and the LICRA (League against Racism and Anti-Semitism) and since 2018 also a member of the Austrian Society for Political Science. As a member of the Ideologies and Politics of Inequality Research Group (FIPU), she was involved in the book Right-Wing Extremism - Volume 1: Developments and Analysis published in 2014. In it, she took a critical look at the protests against the WKR Ball in Vienna under the title Ausgetanzt! in addition to the follow-up volumes from 2016 (Rechtsextremismus - Band 2: Prävention und politische Bildung) and 2019 (Rechtsextremismus - Band 3: Geschlechterreflektierte Perspektiven), Goetz is the author and (co-)editor of the fourth volume of the research group Rechtsextremismus - Band 4: Herausforderungen für den Journalismus. Together with Helga Amesberger, Brigitte Halbmayr and Dirk Lange, she also edited the 2021 anthology Continuities of the Stigmatization of 'Asociality': Perspectives of Socially Critical Political Education, for which she wrote several articles.

In 2004, Goetz ran as the KPÖ's top candidate in the Carinthian state elections.
