= Peter Zaremba (hammer thrower) =

American hammer thrower (1908–1994)

Olympic medal record

Men's athletics

Representing the United States
Bronze medal – third place	1932 Los Angeles	Hammer throw

Peter Timothy Zaremba (April 7, 1908 – September 17, 1994) was an American athlete who competed mainly in the hammer throw. He was born and raised in the Pittsburgh area steel town of Aliquippa, Pennsylvania. He competed for the United States in the 1932 Summer Olympics held in Los Angeles, United States in the hammer throw where he won the bronze medal. He graduated from NYU with an engineering degree, where he was an All-American for the NYU Violets track and field team.
