= Jarosław Studzizba =

Polish footballer (1955–2025)

Personal information
- Date of birth: 28 October 1955
- Place of birth: Nysa, Poland
- Date of death: 26 June 2025 (aged 69)
- Position: Midfielder

Youth career
- Polonia Nysa

Senior career*
| Years | Team | Apps | (Gls) |
| –1973 | Polonia Nysa | | |
| 1973–1974 | Odra Opole | 7 | (0) |
| 1974–1976 | Górnik Zabrze | 33 | (1) |
| 1976–1977 | Polonia Bytom | 29 | (4) |
| 1978 | Polonia Warsaw | | |
| 1979–1981 | Lechia Gdańsk | 53 | (10) |
| 1981–1984 | Eintracht Braunschweig | 59 | (9) |
| 1984–1986 | Austria Salzburg | 27 | (6) |
| 1987–1988 | KFC Winterslag | 24 | (0) |
| 1988–1989 | KSC Hasselt | 20 | (0) |
| 1991–1992 | FC Neeroeteren | | |
| 1992–1994 | KVK Wellen | | |
- * Club domestic league appearances and goals

Jarosław Studzizba (28 October 1955 – 26 June 2025) was a Polish professional footballer who played as a midfielder. He played in the top national leagues in Poland, Germany, Austria and Belgium.

== Biography ==
Born in Nysa, Studzizba began playing football with his local team Polonia Nysa. In 1973 he joined Odra Opole, making his debut in the I liga, Poland's top division. After Odra were relegated at the end of the season he joined Górnik Zabrze. He made his Górnik debut on 28 September 1978, playing in the defeat against Gwardia Warsaw. He made 33 league appearances while at Górnik, also appearing in the UEFA Cup. Afterwards he had spells with Polonia Bytom and Polonia Warsaw, before finding himself at Lechia Gdańsk. He made his Lechia debut on 18 March 1979, playing 13 times in the league for Lechia that season. Over the span of two and a half seasons Studzizba made 53 league appearances and scored 10 goals for Lechia.

Studzizba and his family then moved to Germany, staying with his wife's family. While in Germany he played with Eintracht Braunschweig, playing in the Bundesliga for the club. He made 51 appearances and scored 9 goals in the German top division. He next move was to Austria, playing with Austria Salzburg. In his first season he made 27 appearances in the Austrian first division, playing in the second tier with the club after they suffered relegation. After his two seasons in Austria he moved to Belgium, firstly playing with KFC Winterslag, the team that would later become Genk. Spells with KSC Hasselt, FC Neeroeteren and KVK Wellen followed, with Studzizba retiring from playing in 1994.

Studzizba died on 26 June 2025, at the age of 69.
