= Fellingsbro =

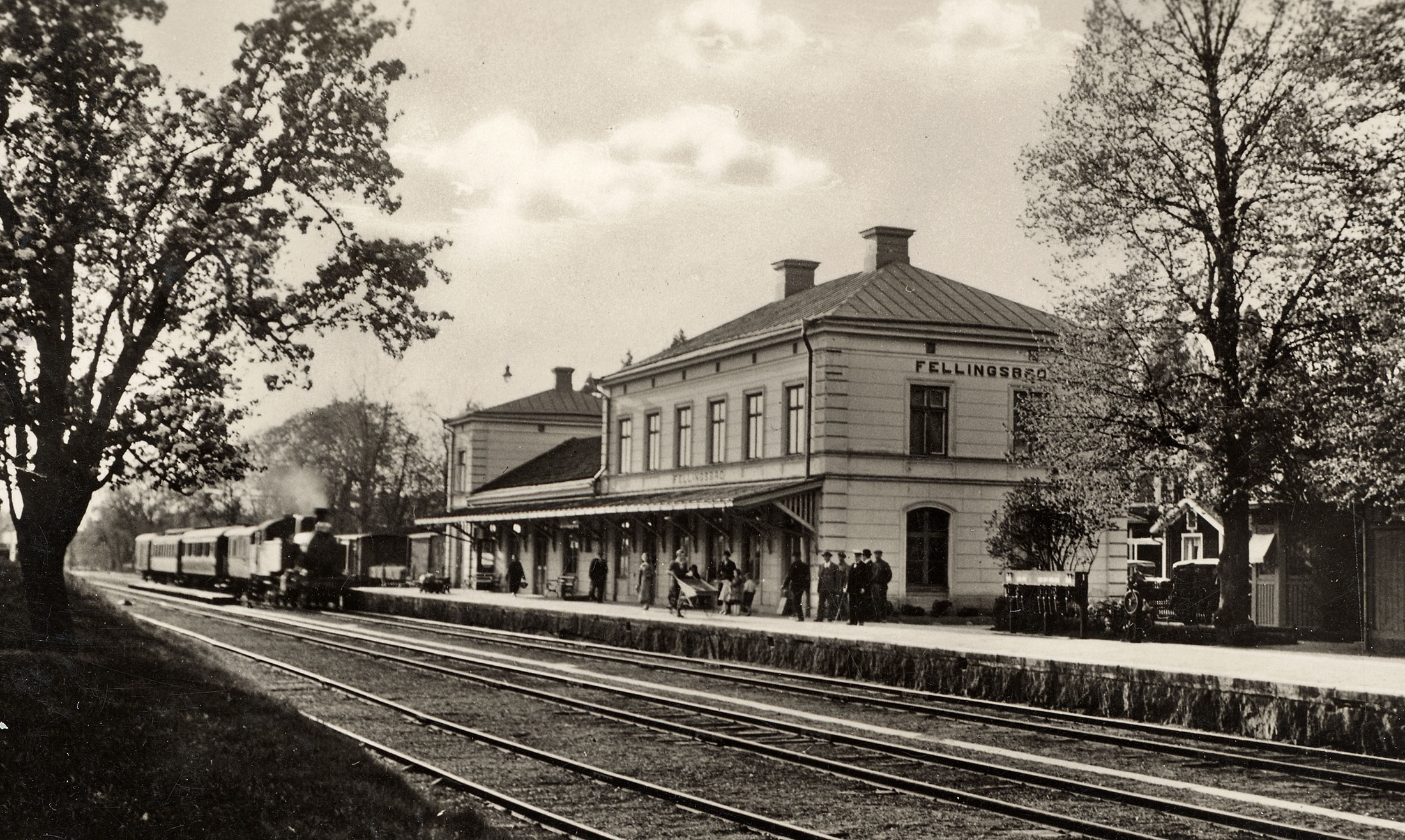
- Fellingsbro railway station in the 1930s.

- Location within Örebro Location within Sweden
- Coordinates: 59°26′N 15°36′E
- Country: Sweden
- Province: Västmanland
- County: Örebro County
- Municipality: Lindesberg Municipality
- First mentioned: 1331

Area
  - Total: 2.30 km^{2} (0.89 sq mi)

Population (31 December 2010)
  - Total: 1,384
  - Density: 600/km^{2} (1,600/sq mi)
- Time zone: UTC+1 (CET)
  - Summer (DST): UTC+2 (CEST)

Fellingsbro (Swedish: [fɛlɪŋsˈbruː], locally [ˈfɛ̌lːsbrʊ]) is a locality and a parish situated in Lindesberg Municipality, Örebro County, Sweden with 1,384 inhabitants in 2010. It is home to the Fellingsbro folk high school.

== History ==
The parish of Fellingsbro is mentioned already in 1331 as Parochia Fælansbro, but the first parish church was probably built already in the 12th century. In the late 16th and early 17th centuries many small ironworks were built at the rivers that are running from north to south in the parish. The main product at these ironworks were bar iron. Most of the people were employed in this small scale iron industry and in the rather extensive farming up until the late 19th century when most of the ironworks were closed. Some of the ironworks were then transformed into paper mills.

In 1857 a railroad between Örebro and Arboga was built and a station in Fellingsbro was opened some kilometres east of the parish church. A new urban area with shops and small mechanical industries soon grew up around this railroad station. This urban area was called Fellingsbro after the name of the parish. It became a municipality of its own in 1911, but was again united with the rest of the parish in 1957 and in 1971 Fellingsbro Municipality was incorporated into Lindesberg Municipality.

Fellingsbro folkhögskola was established in 1915, but was rebuilt in 1976 after a fire burned down the original building.

Notable natives of Fellingsbro include the textile artist Märtha Gahn.

=== Population history ===
Year	Inhabitants in Fellingsbro parish
1700	4 802
1800	4 590
1850	6 383
1900	7 075
1950	5 575 (896 in the urban area)
2008	3 691 (about 1485 in the urban area)

== Riksdag elections ==
While historically the Fellingsbro district leaned centre-right, that changed from 1988 onwards and since then voted for the Social Democratic coalitions for multiple consecutive elections following 1994. As a result of the leftward shift of the Centre Party in 2018, the village voted to the left of the Lindesberg Municipality as a whole for the first time.

Year	%	Votes	V	S	MP	C	L	KD	M	SD	NyD	Left	Right
1973	92.2	2,245	2.0	39.9		36.1	7.5	1.2	13.0			41.9	56.6
1976	92.8	2,327	1.8	39.7		36.1	6.9	0.8	14.6			41.4	57.6
1979	91.0	2,318	2.8	40.6		29.8	6.9	1.2	18.4			43.4	55.1
1982	90.9	2,365	3.1	43.3	1.5	26.3	4.3	1.9	19.4			46.4	50.0
1985	90.2	2,317	3.7	42.5	1.8	23.0	9.8		19.1			46.2	51.9
1988	86.2	2,177	4.5	42.2	4.1	22.8	8.3	3.2	14.8			50.8	45.9
1991	85.0	2,156	3.9	37.8	3.3	18.9	5.8	7.7	15.7		6.8	41.7	48.0
1994	87.4	2,194	5.5	45.5	5.1	18.3	3.8	4.1	16.7		0.7	56.1	42.9
1998	81.5	1,953	12.1	36.7	4.8	15.2	2.2	10.7	17.3			53.6	45.2
2002	81.1	1,857	7.2	41.6	3.9	19.5	7.2	7.0	11.4	1.7		52.7	45.2
2006	78.8	1,759	4.9	40.4	2.7	19.8	3.2	4.5	19.0	3.1		48.0	46.6
2010	83.4	1,622	5.0	38.0	4.4	12.9	4.1	4.5	23.0	7.4		47.4	44.5
2014	86.3	1,660	3.7	35.4	3.5	13.4	2.3	3.3	16.4	19.2		42.7	35.5
2018	85.7	1,609	4.6	30.9	3.0	11.4	2.5	6.8	14.6	24.4		50.0	48.2
