= Peter Grünberger =

German footballer

Personal information
- Full name: Peter Grünberger
- Date of birth: 20 November 1962
- Date of death: 6 May 2021 (aged 58)
- Position: Midfielder

Senior career*
Years	Team	Apps	(Gls)
1981–1983	FC Bayern Munich	2	(0)
1983–1984	VfL Bochum	7	(0)
1984–1985	Union Solingen	7	(0)

International career
1979	West Germany U-16	4	(1)
1979	West Germany U-18	1	(0)
- * Club domestic league appearances and goals

Peter Grünberger (20 November 1962 – 6 May 2021) was a German football midfielder.
