= Bernd Gerber =

German footballer

Personal information
- Full name: Bernd Gerber
- Date of birth: 21 December 1961 (age 64)
- Height: 1.84 m (6 ft 1/2 in)
- Position: Defender

Senior career*
Years	Team	Apps	(Gls)
–1982	1. FC Kaiserslautern II		
1980–1982	1. FC Kaiserslautern	1	(0)
1980–1982	VfR Bürstadt		
1983–1984	VfL Bochum	4	(0)
1984–1987	Blau-Weiß 90 Berlin	82	(3)
1987–1990	SpVgg Bayreuth	60	(5)
- * Club domestic league appearances and goals

Bernd Gerber (born 21 December 1961) is a German former football defender.
