= Christian Schreier =

German footballer (born 1959)

Personal information
- Date of birth: 4 February 1959 (age 67)
- Place of birth: Castrop-Rauxel, West Germany
- Height: 1.75 m (5 ft 9 in)
- Position: Midfielder

Youth career
- –1977: SuS Merklinde

Senior career*
Years	Team	Apps	(Gls)
1977–1978	SV Castrop-Rauxel		
1978–1981	TuS Paderborn-Neuhaus		
1981–1984	VfL Bochum	98	(35)
1984–1991	Bayer Leverkusen	203	(63)
1991–1992	Fortuna Düsseldorf	30	(8)
1992–1994	TuS Paderborn-Neuhaus		
1994–1996	Rot-Weiss Essen	70	(14)
1996–1998	FC Wegberg-Beeck		

International career
1984	West Germany	1	(0)
1984–1988	West Germany Olympic	22	(6)
1986	West Germany B	1	(0)

Managerial career
- Vorwärts Kornharpen (assistant)
- 1. FC Saarbrücken (assistant)
- 2002–2004: FC Schönberg 95
- 2004–2006: MSV Neuruppin
- 2006–2007: Union Berlin
- 2010–2011: TV Jahn Hiesfeld
Medal record
Representing West Germany
Men's Football
Bronze medal – third place	1988 Seoul	Team competition
- * Club domestic league appearances and goals

Christian Schreier (born 4 February 1959) is a German former professional footballer and the general manager of SC Paderborn. He played as a midfielder, most notably with VfL Bochum and Bayer Leverkusen, and won one cap for West Germany, in 1984. His biggest successes came in 1988, when he won the UEFA Cup and an Olympic bronze Medal.
