= Elisabeth Goth =

American horse breeder, horse exhibitor and businesswoman

- Occupation: Businesswoman, horse breeder/exhibitor
- Discipline: Saddle seat
- Born: 1964/1965
- Major wins/Championships: Ladies Five-Gaited Gelding World's Championship in 2014; Reserve Five-Gaited World's Grand Championship in 2015; Reserve Five-Gaited World's Grand Championship in 2016; Fine Harness World's Grand Championship in 2017; Amateur Five-Gaited World's Champion of Champions in 2017
- Lifetime achievements: Vice President of United States Equestrian Federation; Board member of American Saddlebred Horse Association

Honors
- Lurline Roth Sportsmanship Award; ASHA Breeder of the Year in 2012; 2015 Equestrian of the Year; A. J. Cronin Trophy

Significant horses
- Bravo Blue, Lady Mandolin, Fox Grape's The Tiger Lily, Here Comes the Boom

Elisabeth Goth (born 1964/1965) is an American horse breeder, horse exhibitor, and businesswoman. She owns Elisabeth Goth, LLC in Kentucky and raises, shows and sells American Saddlebreds. She has won multiple awards and Championships in the horse industry. She is the vice president of the United States Equestrian Federation.

== Early life and family ==
Goth was born in 1964 or 1965 to Bettina Bancroft and Michael Goth. She had a younger brother named Michael who died at a young age, making her an only child. When her mother died in 1996, she inherited 800,000 shares of stock in Dow Jones, the company that publishes The Wall Street Journal. The company was owned by the Bancroft family for 105 years before they sold it to Rupert Murdoch in 2007. Goth was one of the Bancroft family members who supported selling Dow Jones, reasoning that the family had neglected the company for years and it would do better under new management.

Goth is married to a businessman named Chelberg, who works part time in Prague. She lives in Lebanon, Kentucky.

== Horses ==
Goth was involved with horses from a young age and considered them a constant in her life, since her parents' relationship was often strained, before they ultimately divorced, and they moved across the United States multiple times. Her grandparents owned hunt seat and show jumping horses, her great-aunt had American Saddlebreds, and another relative had Hackneys. Goth herself began riding horses at the age of four, when her parents signed her up for lessons with Bill Gobie of Rancho Santa Fe, California. At seven years old she began taking lessons at Bobbin Hollow Equestrian Center in Amherst, Massachusetts. She got her first horse, a Morgan mare, at the age of 10 and began showing her in small horse shows.

In 1986, Goth focused on American Saddlebreds. She purchased Visser Stables, located at Versailles, Kentucky, and a number of horses. She owns over 20 broodmares.

In 2000, Goth was awarded the Lurline Roth Sportsmanship Award.

In 2007, Goth sponsored the Junior Exhibitor Driving Challenge in the American Royal Horse Show. The purpose of challenge was to promote fine harness driving among youth. In 2012 she was American Saddlebred Horse Association (ASHA) Breeder of the Year.

Goth and the horse Bravo Blue won the Ladies Five-Gaited Gelding World's Championship in 2014's World's Championship Horse Show.

Goth had major accomplishments in 2015. She won Championships in multiple horse shows and was named United States Equestrian Federation Equestrian of the Year. She was also given the C. J. Cronin Trophy. Additionally, she and Bravo Blue won the Reserve Five-Gaited World's Grand Championship. In 2016, Goth won the Reserve Five-Gaited World's Grand Championship on the mare Fox Grape's The Tiger Lily.

In 2017, Goth's three-gaited mare Lady Mandolin was ridden by Kate Harvey Codeanne in the ASHA Triple Crown Challenge. It consisted of a competition between riders who had previously won the Saddle Seat Equitation Triple Crown. Codeanne and Lady Mandolin won.

In the same year, Goth won two titles in the World's Championship Horse Show. Riding her previous reserve winner Fox Grape's The Tiger Lily, she won Amateur Five-Gaited World's Champion of Champions, while driving Here Comes the Boom she took the Fine Harness World's Grand Championship. Goth is the vice president of the United States Equestrian Federation and is on the board of the American Saddlebred Horse Association.
