= Gothic script =

Gothic typeface

Fraktur, a blackletter typeface

"Old English", a blackletter typeface

Century Gothic, a sans-serif typeface

These samplers are provided to assist visitors to identify more easily the desired article, as picture is more helpful than just the text.

Gothic script, letters, text, typeface or font may refer to:

- Gothic alphabet, the Greek-derived writing system of the Gothic language
- Visigothic script, a script style used by the Visigoths in Iberia for writing Latin
- Gothic script (palaeography), a family of handwriting scripts that originally developed from Caroline minuscule in Western Europe in the late 11th century
  - Blackletter, an ornate calligraphic style of Gothic script
    - Fraktur, a form of Blackletter
    - Schwabacher, a form of Blackletter
- Sans-serif, or gothic, a typographical style without serif decorations. In typography, this is the meaning usually associated with the term gothic type, for example Century Gothic.
  - East Asian Gothic typeface, a Chinese, Japanese or Korean typographical style without serifs or analogous decorations

== See also ==
- Script typeface
- Gothic revival - a style of architecture that often included ornamental letters cut in a blackletter-like style
  - Display typeface - typefaces used for titles (such as on buildings) rather than for running text,
