= Franz Götz =

Franz Götz may refer to:

- Franz Götz (composer) (1755–1815), Bohemian composer and violinist
- Franz Götz (politician) (born 1945), German politician
- Franz Götz (pilot) (1913–1980), German Luftwaffe fighter ace
