= Goth =

Goth or Goths may refer to:

- Goths, a Germanic people

== Arts and entertainment ==
- Gothic rock or goth, a style of rock music
- Goth subculture, developed by fans of gothic rock
- Goth (2003 film), an American horror film
- Goth (2008 film), a Japanese drama film
- Goth (novel), by Otsuichi, 2003
- Goths (album), by the Mountain Goats, 2017
- Goth (comics), a demon appearing in DC Comics

== People ==
- Goth (surname), or Göth, or Góth, including a list of people with the name
- The Goth, nickname of Thoby Stephen (1880–1906)

== Other uses ==
- Goth (village), a word meaning village in Sindhi language
- Gothic alphabet (ISO 15924 code: Goth)
- Goths, pubs in Scotland run under the Gothenburg Public House System

== See also ==
- Gothic (disambiguation)
- Gotra, in Hindu culture, considered to be equivalent to lineage
