= Bror Geijer Göthe =

Swedish artist (1892–1949)

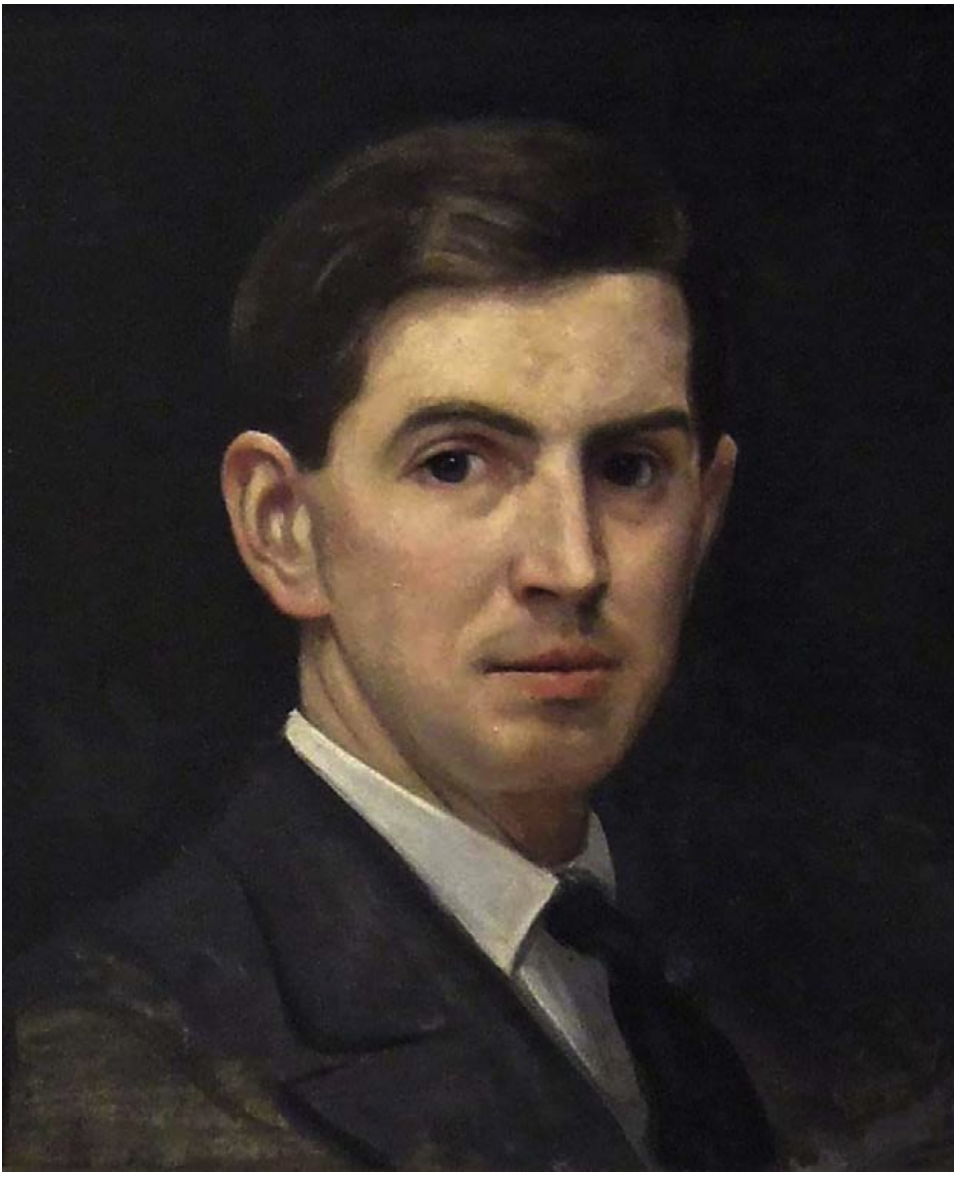
Göthe in 1940

Bror Geijer Göthe (1892–1949) was a Swedish artist, painter and textile artist who revived late medieval methods.

== Life ==
He was born in the Stockholm parish of Maria Magdalena in 1892 and grew up in the suburb of Djursholm outside the city.

Bror Geijer Göthe was called von Geijer after his mother and was the youngest of five children who were raised by his father Georg Göthe and a maid called Hanna after their mother died in 1896.

Göthe grew up in an environment full of aristocrat families such as the Follins, Hamiltons and Lilliehööks. His godfather was the Swedish poet, novelist, essayist and idealist philosopher Viktor Rydberg.

== Works ==
Göthe was a recognized painter and a textile artist. He was, together with Elsa Flensburg, Märtha Gahn and Märtha Hjortzberg-Reuterswärd, one of the founders of "Ateljé Handtryck", 1915, which was a textile workshop producing textiles based on late medieval manufacturing. Göthe was also a co-worker in "Libraria Konsthantverk AB", which was the Swedish Church’s committee connected to the textile industry. His works indicate that he was strongly influenced by the Middle Ages, frequently depicting religious scenes or ornamental compositions. However, his earliest works had Chinese roots.

The significance of Bror Geijer Göthe's art was the innovative way of using the technique of embroidery in art. The way he combined as well as introduced new possibilities for interpreting and enjoying Christian art from the Middle Ages was important for the survival of medieval contemporary art. Because of this, he is, without any doubt, a role model in Swedish sacred textile art. Medieval art could once more be appreciated and could explain some fundamental aspects about the Christian Church. His art can be described as an Art Nouveau-inspired religious pieces and he followed two different paths in his artistic life; one with a strong personal character presentation where the naturalistic or the plastic characters are central on the composition of the piece and, the other path was focusing on the beauty of Art and can nearly be described as strictly decorative.
