= Armando Poggioli =

Italian hammer and discus thrower

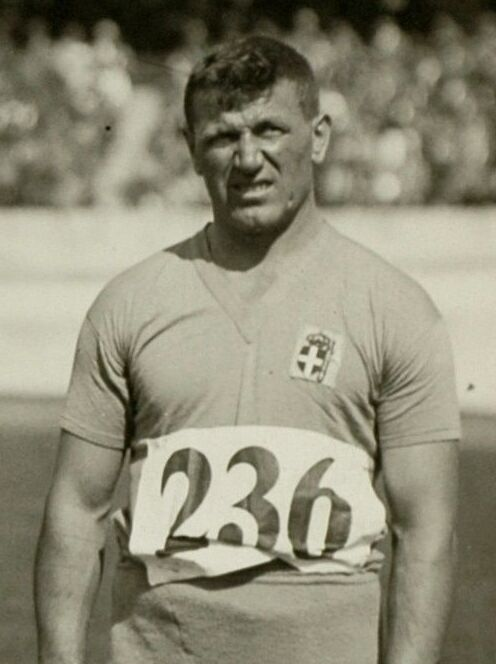
- Armando Poggioli in 1928

Personal information
- Nationality: Italian
- Born: 14 June 1888 Modena, Italy
- Died: 10 January 1967 (aged 78) Modena, Italy
- Height: 170 cm (5 ft 7 in)
- Weight: 80 kg (176 lb)

Sport
- Country: Italy
- Sport: Athletics
- Events: Discus throw Hammer throw
- Club: SG Panaro

Armando Remigio Maria Poggioli (14 June 1888 – 10 January 1967) was an Italian discus thrower and hammer thrower who competed at three Olympic Games.

== Career ==
Poggioli represented Italy at the 1924 Summer Olympics, finishing 25th in the men's discus throw.

Poggioli finished third behind Malcolm Nokes in the hammer throw event at the 1926 AAA Championships but won his first Italian national title at senior level in the hammer during 1926.

He secured three more national hammer titles in 1927, 1928 and 1929 before going to a second Olympic Games in 1928 Summer Olympics, where he narrowly missed claiming a medal after throwing 48.37 and finishing fourth in the Olympic hammer final.

He would go on to win a fifth national title in 1930 and finished second behind Ossian Skiöld in the hammer throw event at the British 1930 AAA Championships.

He later appeared at a third Olympic Games at the 1932 Summer Olympics.
