= Odd Christian Gøthe =

Norwegian civil servant and politician

Odd Christian Gøthe (30 December 1919 – 23 September 2002) was a Norwegian civil servant and politician for the Labour Party.

== Education and career ==
by education, and was head of economics in the Norwegian Confederation of Trade Unions from 1947 to 1952. He served as state secretary in the Ministry of Finance from 1952 to 1955, in the cabinet Torp, and in the Ministry of Industry from 1955 to 1958 in the third cabinet Gerhardsen. After this, he worked as deputy under-secretary of state in the Ministry of Industry from 1958 to 1975. From 1975 to 1986 he served as state negotiator. He published a number of books.
