= Erik Gustaf Göthe =

Swedish sculptor (1779–1838)

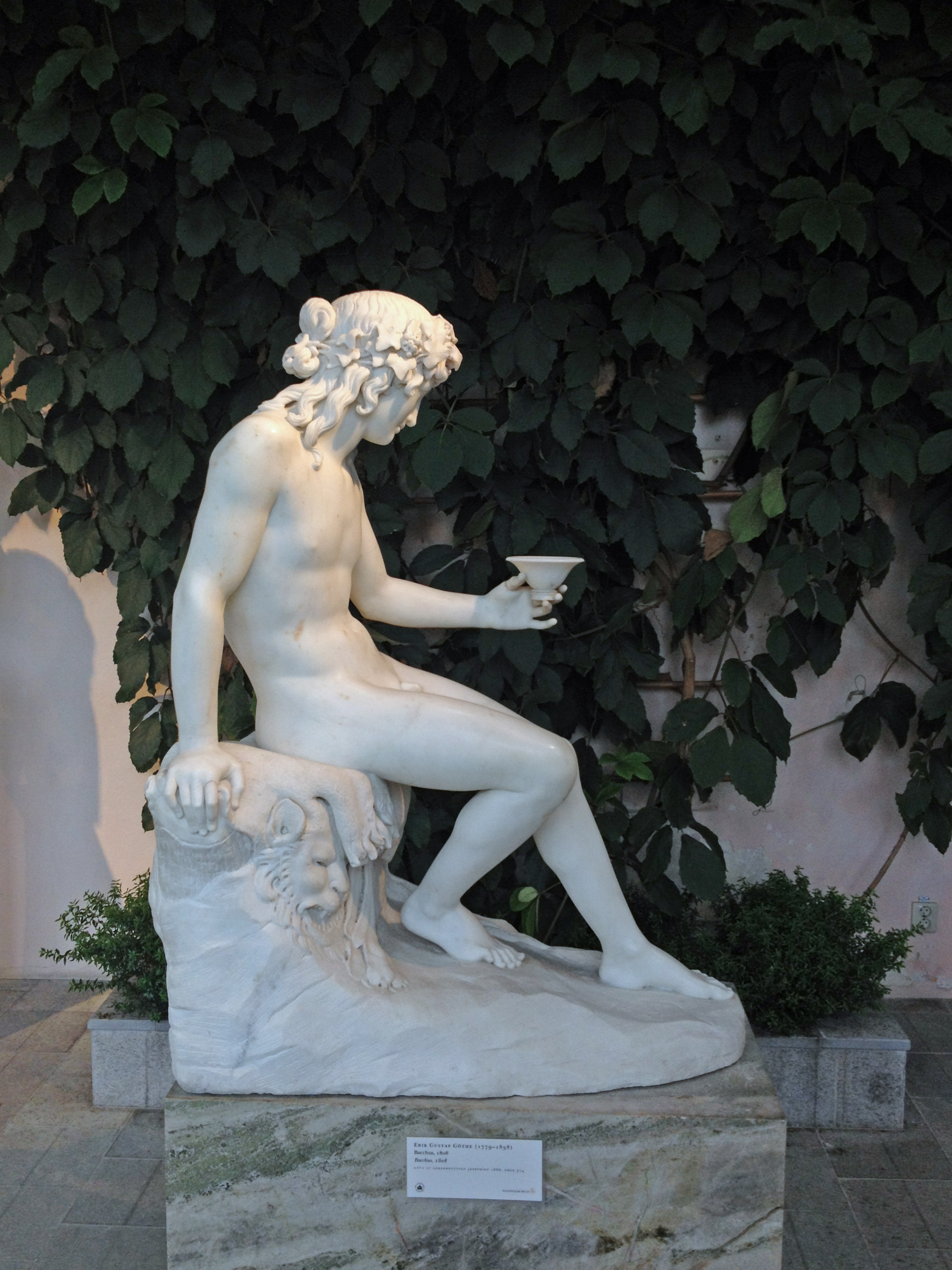
Seated Bacchus by Erik Gustaf Göthe, Rosendal Palace, 1808

Erik Gustaf Göthe (26 July 1779 – 29 November 1838) was a Swedish sculptor.

Göthe had initially planned to become an architect, but went on to train as a sculptor for, among others, Johan Tobias Sergel. After completing training at the Academy of Arts in 1803 he traveled to Italy and studied under Antonio Canova. Returning to Sweden in 1810, he completed a monument to the murdered Axel von Fersen the Younger, but did not attract any major success.

He completed Seated Bacchus outside Rosendal Palace on Djurgården in Stockholm. Other works were Charles XIII of Sweden's statue in the King's Garden which was unveiled in November 1821 on the anniversary of Crown Prince Charles XIV John of Sweden adoption, and the pulpit in St. Jacob's Church in 1828. He was appointed in 1812 to the Academy as a member, and became a professor in 1837. After a stay in Saint Petersburg, where he executed a seated colossal statue of Catherine the Great, he was appointed member of the city's art academy. His last work was the new spire of cast iron for the Riddarholm Church.
