= Ossian Skiöld =

Swedish hammer thrower

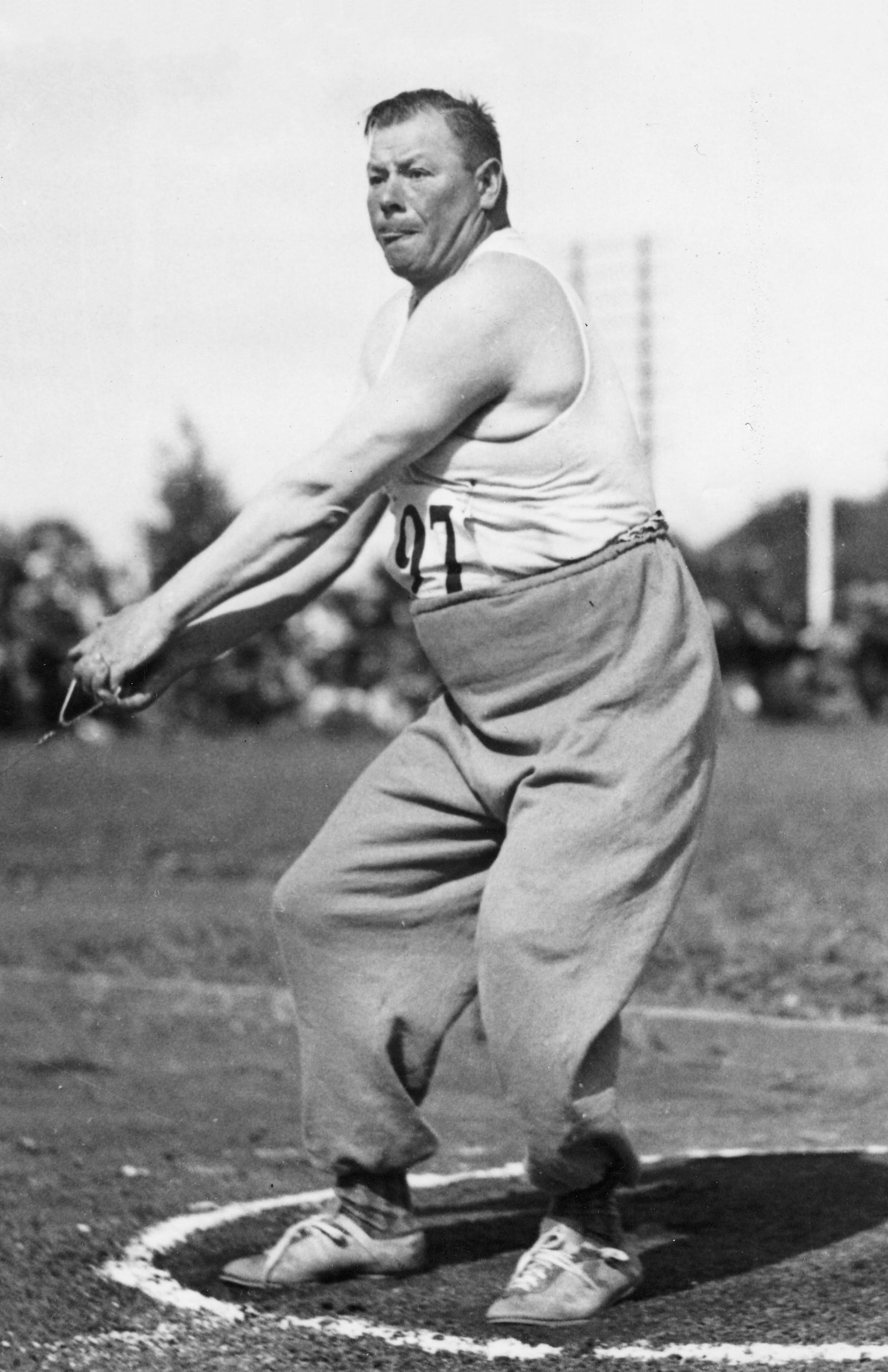

Personal information
- Born: 22 June 1889 Appuna, Sweden
- Died: 22 August 1961 (aged 72) Bålsta, Sweden
- Height: 1.88 m (6 ft 2 in)
- Weight: 110 kg (240 lb)

Sport
- Sport: Athletics
- Event: Hammer throw
- Club: IFK Eskilstuna

Achievements and titles
- Personal best: 53.85 m (1927)
Medal record
Representing Sweden
Olympic Games
Silver medal – second place	1928 Amsterdam	Hammer throw

Ossian Esaias Skiöld (22 June 1889 – 22 August 1961) was a Swedish hammer thrower who competed at three Olympic Games.

== Biography ==
Skiöld's first Olympics were the 1924 Summer Olympics, where he finished fifth in the men's hammer throw. In 1927 Skiöld won the British AAA Championships in the hammer throw event at the 1927 AAA Championships

He competed at his second Olympics in 1928 and secured a silver medal in the hamnmer throw behind Pat O'Callaghan. Skiöld repeated the feat of winning the British AAA hammer title at the 1930 AAA Championships and the 1931 AAA Championships.

Skiöld's final Olympics was the 1932 Summer Olympics in Los Angeles and was just outside of the medal podium after finishing fourth in the hammer event. He also placed fourth at the 1934 European Championships. Skiöld was policeman by profession.
