= Florian Gothe =

German footballer

Personal information
- Full name: Florian Gothe
- Date of birth: 9 August 1962 (age 64)
- Place of birth: Bochum, West Germany
- Height: 1.83 m (6 ft 0 in)
- Position: Defender

Youth career
- –1978: SV Blau-Weiss Weitmar 09
- 1978–1981: VfL Bochum

Senior career*
Years	Team	Apps	(Gls)
1981–1983	VfL Bochum II		
1983–1985	VfL Bochum	27	(1)
1985–1988	Rot-Weiß Oberhausen	93	(12)
1988–1991	1. FC Saarbrücken	76	(3)
- * Club domestic league appearances and goals

Florian Gothe (born 9 August 1962 in Bochum) is a retired German football defender. and current president of the Vereinigung der Vertragsfußballspieler (VDV).

== Career ==
Gothe, who started playing football at the age of eight at Post SV Bochum, played a total of 196 games in the Bundesliga and 2. Bundesliga between 1983 and 1991, in which he scored 16 goals.

In 1999, the former VfL Bochum professional was elected President of the Vereinigung der Vertragsfußballspieler (VDV) to succeed Jürgen Sparwasser. Under his leadership, the organization was able to emerge from what was then an existential crisis. When he was re-elected in 2006, he was unanimously confirmed in office.

In November 2009, Gothe appeared publicly when, in connection with the suicide of the German soccer goalkeeper Robert Enke, he spoke out in favour of greater support for soccer players in overcoming personal psychological problems.

== Miscellaneous ==
In addition to his career as a soccer player, he successfully completed his law studies and now works as a notary in Solingen. In addition, Florian Gothe is an honorary judge at the DFB Federal Court.
