= Deaths in March 1995 =

The following is a list of notable deaths in March 1995.

Entries for each day are listed alphabetically by surname. A typical entry lists information in the following sequence:

- Name, age, country of citizenship at birth, subsequent country of citizenship (if applicable), reason for notability, cause of death (if known), and reference.

== March 1995 ==
=== 1 ===
- Edmund Fisher, 56, British publisher, cancer.
- Walter Anderson, 84, British trade unionist.
- Fred J. Borch, 84, American businessman who was chairman and CEO of General Electric.
- Eugenio Corecco, 63, Swiss Catholic bishop, cancer.
- Simon C. Dik, 54, Dutch linguist.
- Jackie Holmes, 74, American racecar driver.
- Georges J. F. Köhler, 48, German biologist, heart attack.
- Vladislav Listyev, 38, Russian journalist, murdered.
- Ferdinand Lundberg, 89, American journalist.
- Herb Meadow, 83, American television producer and writer, heart attack.
- Emil Petru, 55, Romanian football player and Olympian (1964).
- Hugh Auchincloss Steers, 32, American painter, AIDS-related complications.
- César Rodríguez Álvarez, 74, Spanish football forward and manager.

=== 2 ===
- Suzanne Bastid, 88, French professor of law.
- David Davis, 93, New Zealand cricketer.
- Henry Felsen, 78, American writer.
- Vivian MacKerrell, 50, British actor, esophageal cancer.
- Ray Moore, 68, American Major League Baseball player.

=== 3 ===
- Rafael Aguilar, 65, Ecuadorian ballet dancer and choreographer.
- Vincent L. Broderick, 74, United States District Judge, cancer.
- Al Christy, 76, American actor, advertising executive, and radio and television announcer.
- Nikhil Ghosh, 76, Indian musician, teacher and writer.
- Humphry Greenwood, 67, English ichthyologist.
- Sheikh Anwarul Haq, 77, Pakistani jurist and an academic.
- Howard W. Hunter, 87, American President of the Church of Jesus Christ of Latter-day Saints, prostate cancer.
- Lyman Kirkpatrick, 77, inspector general and executive director of the CIA.
- Douglas Stewart, 75, American film editor (The Right Stuff, Invasion of the Body Snatchers, The Great Northfield, Minnesota Raid), Oscar winner (1984).
- Jean Thureau, 67, French Olympic hurdler (1952).
- Pierre Tisseyre, 85, French-Canadian lawyer, journalist, writer and Quebec literary editor.
- Đàm Quang Trung, 73, Vietnamese general in the People's Army of Vietnam.

=== 4 ===
- Eden Ahbez, 86, American songwriter and recording artist, traffic collision.
- Fred Bergdinon, 88, Canadian ice hockey player (Boston Bruins).
- Bernhard Greulich, 92, German athlete and Olympian (1936).
- Iftekhar, 75, Indian actor.
- James Bryan McMillan, 78, American district judge (United States District Court for the Western District of North Carolina).
- Vira Misevych, 49, Soviet/Russian equestrian and Olympic champion (1980).
- Dan Păltinișanu, 43, Romanian footballer.
- Peggy Solomon, 86, American bridge player.
- Matt Urban, 75, United States Army lieutenant colonel and one of the most decorated soldiers of World War II.
- Andrzej Wołkowski, 82, Polish ice hockey player and Olympian (1936).
- Gloria Wood, 71, American singer and voice actress.

=== 5 ===
- Jalal Agha, 49, Indian actor and director in Bollywood films, heart attack.
- Frieda Belinfante, 90, Dutch freedom fighter during World War II, cellist, and orchestra conductor, cancer.
- Henry Benson, Baron Benson, 85, British accountant.
- Juan Guerrero Burciaga, 65, United States District Judge.
- Gregg Hansford, 42, Australian motorcycle and touring car racer, racing accident.
- Roy Hughes, 84, American baseball player.
- Marguerite Kelsey, 86, British artists' model.
- Roger MacBride, 65, American lawyer, political figure, writer, and television producer.
- Nancy O'Neil, 83, Australian-born British actress.
- Vivian Stanshall, 51, English comedian, writer, artist, broadcaster, and musician, domestic fire.
- Erwin Verstegen, 24, Dutch Olympic archer (1992).

=== 6 ===
- Franco Bertinetti, 71, Italian fencer and Olympic gold medalist (1952, 1956).
- Gabriel Bracho, 79, Venezuelan artist.
- Noël de Mille, 85, Canadian Olympic rower (1932).
- Barbara Kwiatkowska-Lass, 54, Polish actress, stroke.
- Moturi Satyanarayana, 93, Indian independence activist.
- Delroy Wilson, 46, Jamaican ska, rocksteady and reggae singer, cirrhosis.

=== 7 ===
- John J. Allen Jr., 95, American politician, member of the United States House of Representatives (1947-1959).
- Henry Bichel, 83, Australian rugby league footballer.
- Don Cook, 74, American journalist.
- Ivan Craig, 83, Scottish actor.
- Harold W. Hannold, 83, American Republican Party politician.
- Róża Herman, 93, Polish chess player.
- Najib Kilani, 63, Egyptian poet and novelist.
- John Lambert, 68, British composer and music educator.
- B. N. B. Rao, 85, Indian surgeon, medical academic, researcher, and writer.
- Norman Rosten, 82, American poet, playwright, and novelist.
- Paul-Émile Victor, 87, French ethnologist and explorer.
- Kazimierz Wiłkomirski, 94, Polish cellist, composer and conductor.

=== 8 ===
- Manuel Escobar, 70, Salvadorian Olympic sailor (1968).
- Naomi Feinbrun-Dothan, 94, Russian-Israeli botanist.
- Geoff Frood, 88, Australian rules footballer.
- Rudolf Geigy, 92, Swiss biologist, assisted suicide.
- Junpei Gomikawa, 78, Japanese novelist.
- Paul Horgan, 91, American novelist and historian.
- Ike Lozada, 54, Filipino comedian, actor and TV host, heart attack.
- John Ormond, 89, New Zealand businessman and farmer.
- Sooranad Kunjan Pillai, 83, Indian writer, literary critic, and scholar of the Malayalam language.
- Ingo Schwichtenberg, 29, German drummer, suicide.
- William Elwood Steckler, 81, American district judge (United States District Court for the Southern District of Indiana).

=== 9 ===
- Ian Ballantine, 79, American publisher, heart attack.
- Edward Bernays, 103, Austrian-born American propagandist.
- Bill Cassidy, 54, Scottish football player and manager.
- Cedric Elmes 85, New Zealand cricketer.
- Yisrael Galil, 71, Israeli firearm designer.
- Paco Jamandreu, 75, Argentine fashion designer and actor, heart attack.
- Ricardo Mañé, 47, Uruguayan mathematician.
- Robert Sheats, 79, United States Navy Master Diver.

=== 10 ===
- Rigmor Andersen, 91, Danish designer, educator and author.
- Fred Davis, 77, American gridiron football player (Washington Redskins, Chicago Bears).
- Doris Duranti, 77, Italian film actress.
- John F. Gerry, 69, American district judge (United States District Court for the District of New Jersey).
- Wilhelm Heckmann, 97, German concert and easy listening musician.
- Russell Keays, 81, Canadian politician, member of the House of Commons of Canada (1958-1962, 1965-1968).
- David D. Keck, 91, American botanist.
- Alexander Hyatt King, 83, English musicologist, bibliographer, and music librarian of the British Library and British Museum.
- Ovidi Montllor, 53, Spanish singer and actor, esophageal cancer.
- Mattityahu Peled, 71, Israeli public figure.
- Irene Tedrow, 87, American actress, stroke.
- Michal Tučný, 48, Czech singer and songwriter, cancer, liver cancer.
- Dicky Zulkarnaen, 55, Indonesian actor.

=== 11 ===
- Antonio León Amador, 85, Spanish football player.
- Rein Aun, 54, Soviet Estonian decathlete and Olympic medalist (1964, 1968).
- Jean Bayard, 97, French Olympic rugby player (1924).
- Bobby Ewer, 90, Australian rules footballer.
- Alf Goullet, 103, Australian cyclist.
- Carlos Albán Holguín, 64, Colombian lawyer and politician.
- Wilfred Jacobs, 75, first Governor-General of Antigua and Barbuda.
- Ernest Kabushemeye, Burundian politician and the Minister for Mines and Energy, assassinated.
- Don Lane, 59, Australian politician and minister.
- Don Manno, 79, American baseball player (Boston Bees/Braves).
- Jean-Pierre Masson, 76, Canadian film and television actor.
- Herb McCracken, 95, American football player and coach.
- Gérard Pasquier, 66, French Olympic alpine skier (1956), and curler.
- Lotte Rausch, 81, German stage and film actress.
- María Rosa Salgado, 65, Spanish actress.
- James Scott-Hopkins, 73, British Conservative politician.
- Myfanwy Talog, 50, Welsh actress, breast cancer.
- Väinö Valve, 99, Finnish general and navy commander.
- Karl Österreicher, 72, Austrian conductor and music teacher.

=== 12 ===
- Mija Aleksić, 71, Serbian actor.
- Dumitru Almaș, 86, Romanian journalist, novelist, historian, writer and professor.
- Madis Aruja, 59, Estonian conservationist, geographer and ski-orienteer.
- Juanin Clay, 45, American actress and director.
- Jørgen Jensen, 55, Danish Olympic wrestler (1960, 1964).
- Jack Mowat, 86, Scottish football referee.
- Rick Muther, 59, American racing driver.

=== 13 ===
- Mieczysław Balcer, 88, Polish football player.
- Leon Day, 78, American baseball Hall of Fame player, heart attack.
- Jonas C. Greenfield, 68, American scholar of Semitic languages.
- Odette Hallowes, 82, French intelligence officer.
- William Hulse, 74, American middle-distance runner.
- Abdul Ali Mazari, 48-49, Afghan warlord and politician, executed by the Taliban.

=== 14 ===
- Dennis Bell, 46, American journalist Pulitzer Prize winner, pneumonia.
- Frank Blair, 79, broadcast journalist for NBC News who was news anchor of Today.
- Alessandro Cutolo, 95, Italian academic, television presenter, actor and historian.
- William Alfred Fowler, 83, American physicist.
- Georges Gschwind, 85, Swiss Olympic rower (1936).
- John Peters Humphrey, 89, Canadian legal scholar, jurist, and human rights advocate.
- Charlie Letchas, 79, American baseball player (Philadelphia Phillies, Washington Senators).
- Hughie Price, 86, Australian rules footballer.
- Ed Roberts, 56, American activist.
- Gerard Victory, 73, Irish composer.
- W. Arthur Winstead, 91, American politician, member of the United States House of Representatives (1943-1965).

=== 15 ===
- Bhupinder Singh Brar, 68, Indian politician.
- Milo Calhoun, 54, Jamaican boxer who won the British Commonwealth middleweight title.
- Florence Chadwick, 76, American long-distance swimmer and first woman to swim the English Channel in both directions.
- Wolfgang Harich, 71, East German philosopher and journalist.
- Carlos Menem Jr., 26, Argentine rally driver, helicopter crash.
- Fred Mulley, 76, British politician, barrister and economist.
- Silvio Oltra, 37, Argentine racing driver, helicopter crash.
- Steve Sharkey, 76, American basketball player (Syracuse Nationals).

=== 16 ===
- John Cavosie, 87, American football player (Portsmouth Spartans).
- Albert Hackett, 95, American dramatist and screenwriter.
- Paul Kipkoech, 32, Kenyan long-distance runner and Olympian (1984).
- Simon Fraser, 15th Lord Lovat, 83, British Commando during World War II and nobleman.
- Art Mollner, 82, American basketball player and Olympian (1936).
- Heinrich Sutermeister, 84, Swiss composer.

=== 17 ===
- Amiraslan Aliyev, 34, Azerbaijan military officer and National Hero of Azerbaijan, killed in action.
- Al Alvarez, 82, American basketball player.
- Rick Aviles, 42, American actor (Ghost, Carlito's Way, The Stand), AIDS-related complications.
- Paul Backman, 74, Finnish cyclist and Olympian (1948, 1952).
- Donald Baverstock, 71, British television producer and executive.
- Vladimir Bunchikov, 92, Russian baritone.
- Helen Christie, 80, British actress.
- Seymour Clark, 92, English cricketer.
- Theresa Clay, 84, English entomologist.
- Flor Contemplacion, 42, Filipina domestic worker executed in Singapore for murder, hanged.
- Estálin, 72, Spanish screenwriter and film director, liver cancer.
- Pedro J. González, 99, Mexican activist, musician and radio personality.
- Arthur Highland, 83, American competition swimmer and Olympian (1936).
- Julius Janowsky, 64, Austrian Olympic diver (1952).
- Rovshan Javadov, 43, Azerbaijani Armed Forces officer and politician.
- Muriel Kauffman, 78, American civic leader and philanthropist.
- Ahmad Khomeini, 49, Iranian politician and son of Ayatollah Ruhollah Khomeini, heart attack.
- Ronnie Kray, 61, British criminal and twin brother of Reggie Kray, heart attack.
- Robert Monroe, 79, American radio broadcasting executive.
- Sunnyland Slim, 88, American blues pianist, kidney failure.
- Howard Thomas, 90, Canadian wrestler and Olympian (1932, 1936).
- Jimmy Uchrinscko, 94, American baseball player (Washington Senators).

=== 18 ===
- Sadri Alışık, 69, Turkish actor.
- Gé Dekker, 90, Dutch Olympic swimmer (1924).
- Merv Harvey, 76, Australian cricketer.
- James H. Howard, 81, United States Air Force general and recipient of the Medal of Honor.
- Vern Huffman, 80, American gridiron football player (Detroit Lions).
- Hugh Kelsey, 69, Scottish bridge player and writer.
- Pengiran Ahmad Raffae, 87, Malaysian politician.
- Fred Ramsey, 80, American writer on jazz and record producer.
- Gerry Shaw, 52, Canadian football player.
- Eric Winkler, 75, Canadian politician.

=== 19 ===
- Stan Ackermans, 58, Dutch mathematician.
- Nike Ardilla, 19, Indonesian singer, actress, and model, traffic accident.
- Trevor Blokdyk, 59, South African motorcycle speedway rider and Formula One driver.
- Walter F. Boone, 97, United States Navy admiral.
- Max Braithwaite, 83, Canadian novelist.
- Tony Chachere, 89, American businessman and chef.
- Len Harris, 70, Australian rules footballer.
- Wolfgang Plath, 64, German musicologist.
- Jürgen Schütz, 55, German football player.
- Gerard Tebroke, 45, Dutch long-distance runner and Olympian (1980), brain haemorrhage.
- Yasuo Yamada, 62, Japanese voice actor (Lupin III), complications from a brain hemorrhage.

=== 20 ===
- Michael Arattukulam, 84, first bishop of the Roman Catholic Diocese of Alleppey.
- Russell Braddon, 74, Australian writer of novels, biographies and TV scripts.
- Thomas J. Grasso, 32, American double murderer, execution by lethal injection.
- Harry Jones, 72, Welsh cricketer.
- James Kilfedder, 66, Northern Ireland unionist politician.
- Sidney Kingsley, 88, American dramatist.
- Werner Liebrich, 68, German football player, heart failure.
- Luis Saslavsky, 91, Argentine film director, screenwriter and film producer.
- Big John Studd, 47, American professional wrestler, lymphoma cancer.
- Víctor Ugarte, 68, Bolivian football player.

=== 21 ===
- Paul Callaway, 85, American organist and conductor.
- William Henderson, 77, South African cricketer.
- Amir H. Jamal, 73, Tanzanian politician and diplomat.
- Connie Kreski, 48, American model and actress, lung cancer.
- Étienne Martin, 82, French sculptor.
- Francis E. Merritt, 74, American college football player (Army Cadets) and athletics director (Air Force Falcons).
- Tony Monopoly, 50, Australian cabaret singer and actor.
- Bob Morton, 51, Australian rules footballer.
- Wedell Østergaard, 70, Danish Olympic cyclist (1952).
- Robert Urquhart, 72, Scottish character actor.
- James Bud Walton, 73, American businessman and co-founder of Walmart.

=== 22 ===
- Robert Beauchamp, 71-72, American figurative painter and arts educator, prostate cancer.
- Jack Eastwood, 87, Canadian Olympic figure skater (1928).
- James G. Horsfall, 90, American biologist, plant pathologist, and agriculturist.
- Huang Jiqing, 90, Chinese geologist.
- Peter Woods, 64, British journalist, cancer.

=== 23 ===
- Qadeeruddin Ahmed, 85-86, Pakistani jurist and former Governor of Sindh province.
- Alan Barton, 41, British singer and member of the duo Black Lace, traffic accident.
- Shakti Chattopadhyay, 61, Indian poet and writer.
- Davie Cooper, 39, Scottish football player, brain haemorrhage.
- Alfons Deloor, 84, Belgian racing cyclist.
- Vladimir Ivashov, 55, Soviet/Russian actor, heart attack.
- Jerry Lester, 85, American comedian, singer and performer, Alzheimer's disease.
- Hal Mooney, 84, American composer and arranger.
- Irving Shulman, 81, American author and screenwriter, Alzheimer's disease.
- Sam Thomson, 83, Scottish sportsman.
- Lou Zhicen, 75, Chinese pharmacognosist and educator.

=== 24 ===
- Chet Mutryn, 74, American gridiron football player (Buffalo Bills, Baltimore Colts).
- Joseph Needham, 94, British biochemist, historian, and sinologist, Parkinson's disease.
- Carlo Pavesi, 71, Italian fencer and Olympian (1952, 1956, 1960).
- Henri Xhonneux, 49, Belgian film director and screenwriter.

=== 25 ===
- James Samuel Coleman, 68, American sociologist.
- James Gardner, 87, British designer.
- John Hugenholtz, 80, Dutch designer of race tracks and cars, traffic collision.
- Stuart Milner-Barry, 88, British chess player, chess writer, and codebreaker during World War II.
- Hugh Wade, 93, American politician.

=== 26 ===
- John Bright, 86, American biblical scholar.
- Raúl Cascaret, 32, Cuban wrestler and Olympian (1980).
- Belgin Doruk, 58, Turkish film actress.
- Eazy-E, 30, American rapper and record producer, complications from AIDS.
- Frans Mahn, 61, Dutch cyclist.
- Vladimir Maksimov, 64, Russian writer.
- Alejandro Morera, 85, Costa Rican football player.
- Ko Takamoro, 87, Japanese football player.

=== 27 ===
- René Allio, 70, French film and theater director.
- John F. Blake, 72, American intelligence official who was Deputy Director of the Central Intelligence Agency.
- Paul Brinegar, 77, American actor (Rawhide, Lancer, High Plains Drifter), pulmonary emphysema.
- Albert Drach, 92, Austrian-Jewish writer who won the Georg Büchner Prize in 1988.
- Margita Figuli, 85, Slovak prose writer, translator and children's author.
- Maurizio Gucci, 46, Italian businessman and the one-time head of the Gucci fashion house, homicide.
- Tony Lovink, 92, Dutch diplomat.
- Chet Nichols Jr., 64, American baseball player (Boston/Milwaukee Braves, Boston Red Sox, Cincinnati Reds).
- Imre Nyéki, 66, Hungarian swimmer and Olympic medalist (1948, 1952).

=== 28 ===
- Fred Backway, 81, Australian rules footballer.
- Julian Cayo-Evans, 57, Welsh political activist.
- Mogens Ellegaard, 60, Danish accordionist.
- Hanns Joachim Friedrichs, 68, German journalist, lung cancer.
- Louis Gilliéron, 85, Swiss Olympic field hockey player (1936).
- Billy Green, 85, Australian rules footballer.
- William Hayter, 88, British diplomat, ambassador to the Soviet Union, and Warden of New College, Oxford.
- Jim Hovey, 72, Australian rules footballer.
- Jack Jennings, 71, Australian politician.
- Hari Dev Joshi, 73, Indian freedom fighter and politician.
- Ana Mariscal, 71, Spanish film actress, director, screenwriter and film producer.
- Hugh O'Connor, 32, American actor (In the Heat of the Night), suicide.
- Albert Pratz, 80, Canadian violinist, conductor, and composer.
- Steve Stonebreaker, 56, American gridiron football player (Minnesota Vikings, Baltimore Colts, New Orleans Saints), suicide.
- Harold M. Weintraub, 49, American scientist, brain tumor.

=== 29 ===
- Robert Breusch, 87, German-American number theorist.
- Harindra Dave, 64, Indian poet, journalist, playwright and novelist.
- Allan Fjeldheim, 76, Norwegian pair skater and Olympian (1948).
- Richard F. Gallagher, 85, American baseball, basketball and American football coach and administrator.
- Antony Hamilton, 42, English–Australian actor, model and dancer, pneumonia.
- Milton Horn, 88, Russian American sculptor and artist.
- Carl Jefferson, 75, American jazz record producer.
- Jimmy McShane, 37, Irish singer and front-man of band Baltimora, AIDS.
- Mort Meskin, 78, American comic book artist.
- Terry Moore, 82, American baseball player (St. Louis Cardinals), and manager, and coach.
- Donald Morrow, 86, Canadian politician.
- Katherine Squire, 92, American actress.
- John Terry, 81, British film financier and lawyer.
- Pops Yoshimura, 72, Japanese motorcycle tuner and race team owner, cancer.

=== 30 ===
- Arkadiusz Bachur, 33, Polish Olympic equestrian (1992).
- Rozelle Claxton, 82, American jazz pianist.
- Marcus Ervine-Andrews, 83, Irish officer in the British Army and recipient of the Victoria Cross.
- Paul Grubenthal, 62, Austrian Olympic gymnast (1952).
- Charles Irving, 70, British politician.
- William Kooistra, 68, American Olympic water polo player (1952, 1956).
- Tony Lock, 65, English cricket player.
- Willem Peters, 91, Dutch triple jumper and Olympian (1924, 1928, 1932).
- Paul A. Rothchild, 59, American record producer, lung cancer.
- John Lighton Synge, 98, Irish mathematician and physicist.

=== 31 ===
- Robert Annis, 66, American soccer player and Olympian (1948).
- Gustaf Adolf Boltenstern Jr., 90, Swedish officer and horse rider and Olympian (1932, 1948, 1952, 1956).
- Max Brüel, 67, Danish architect and jazz musician.
- Roberto Juarroz, 69, Argentine poet.
- Ryogo Kubo, 75, Japanese mathematical physicist.
- Leo W. Morgan, 81, Australian rules footballer.
- Kazuo Noda, 86, Japanese swimmer and Olympian (1924, 1928).
- Rudy Rutherford, 70, American jazz saxophonist and clarinetist.
- Selena, 23, American singer, murdered.
- Madeleine Sologne, 82, French actress.
- Carl Story, 78, American bluegrass musician.
- Kim Yong-shik, 81, South Korean lawyer and diplomat.
