= William Rowe (athlete) =

American hammer thrower (1913–1938)

William John Alfred Rowe (May 27, 1913 – April 20, 1938) was an American hammer thrower. He was United States champion in 1936 and placed fifth in the 1936 Summer Olympics.

== Athletic career ==
Rowe studied at Rhode Island State College, where Fred Tootell, former Olympic hammer throw champion, served as track and field coach. Rhode Island alumni led America in the hammer and weight throws in the mid-1930s; apart from Rowe, Tootell's star pupils included Henry Dreyer and Irving Folwartshny. At 5 ft 11 in (183 cm) and 175 lbs (79 kg), Rowe was small for a heavy thrower; his teammate, "Shorty" Folwartshny, was 6 ft 6 in (198 cm) tall and weighed 225 lbs (102 kg) as a sophomore. Rowe missed much of the 1935 season due to an injury, but his best mark that year, 173 ft 10 in (52.98 m), still placed him third among Americans behind Dreyer and Chester Cruikshank.

In the 1936 IC4A championships Rowe only placed third behind Folwartshny and Anton Kishon, throwing 162 ft 7/8 in (49.39 m); in addition, he placed fourth in his second event, the discus throw. At that year's national championships Rowe turned the tables and won the hammer title with a best mark of 175 ft 7 in (53.51 m), defeating both Folwartshny and defending champion Dreyer by more than eight feet. At the Olympic Trials, which were held separately later that summer, Rowe threw 171 ft 9 1/2 in (52.36 m) and lost to Dreyer by two inches; he qualified for the Olympic team, together with Dreyer and Don Favor. In Berlin Rowe qualified for the Olympic final and placed fifth with a throw of 51.66 m (169 ft 5 47/64 in); he was the best of the Americans.

Rowe never won the IC4A hammer title, which in 1937 again went to Folwartshny; however, he did win that year's IC4A discus title with a throw of 148 ft 7 1/2 in (45.28 m).

== Death ==
Rowe died in New York Post-Graduate Hospital on April 20, 1938, having been hospitalized since the previous week "suffering from mysterious growths under both armpits".
