= Irving Folwartshny =

American hammer thrower and weight thrower (1914–1994)

Irving Henry "Shorty" Folsworth (born Folwartshny; March 16, 1914 – July 27, 1994) was an American hammer thrower and weight thrower. He was a seven-time United States champion and briefly held the indoor world record in men's weight throw.

== Biography ==
Like his fellow hammer thrower Don Favor, Irving Folwartshny was an alumnus of Deering High School in Portland, Maine. Subsequently, he studied at Rhode Island State College, where Fred Tootell, 1924 Olympic hammer throw champion, was track and field coach; Tootell's other pupils included Henry Dreyer and Bill Rowe, both of whom also became national hammer throw champions.

Folwartshny placed fourth in the 35-lb weight throw at the 1935 national indoor championships, but his breakthrough year was 1936, his sophomore year at Rhode Island, when his results improved rapidly. At the 1936 indoor championships he won the weight throw with a heave of 58 ft 1 1/2 in (17.71 m), defeating Dreyer and Pete Zaremba and breaking Dreyer's world record by four and a half inches; as a world record Folwartshny's throw was short-lived, as Dreyer threw 58 ft 4 1/2 in (17.79 m) only seven days later; but as a championship record it lasted until 1951.

During the 1936 outdoor season Folwartshny repeatedly threw the hammer over 170 ft (52 m), smashing his 1935 best of 156 ft (48 m). He won the IC4A hammer championship with a throw of 172 ft 9 3/8 in (52.66 m), ahead of Bates's Anton Kishon and Rowe. At the national championships Folwartshny threw 167 ft 1/4 in (50.90 m) and took second behind Rowe; like his fellow Rhode Island throwers Rowe and Dreyer, he was one of the favorites to qualify for the American Olympic team. The Olympic Trials, however, were held separately from the national championships for the first time since 1924; at the Trials, Dreyer and Rowe took first and second, but the third and final Olympic spot went to Don Favor as Folwartshny only managed 157 ft 3 1/4 in (47.93 m) and placed sixth.

In 1937 Folwartshny won his second national indoor weight throw title with a throw of 57 ft 4 3/4 in (17.49 m), again defeating Dreyer. He also won the IC4A indoor weight throw and successfully defended his outdoor IC4A hammer title. In addition, he became national (AAU) outdoor champion for the first time, throwing the hammer 173 ft 7 5/8 in (52.92 m) and beating runner-up Bill Lynch by seven feet.

In 1938 Folwartshny repeated as AAU and IC4A weight throw champion indoors and reached his peak as a hammer thrower outdoors. He won his third consecutive IC4A hammer title with a throw of 178 ft 9 3/4 in (54.50 m), then the second-best mark in IC4A history behind his own coach, Fred Tootell, who had thrown 181 ft 6 1/2 in (55.33 m) when he won in 1923. Folwartshny also repeated as AAU hammer champion, throwing 179 ft 3 in (54.64 m) in that meet; it was the best throw at the national championships since Pat Ryan's meeting record of 183 ft 3 3/4 in (55.87 m) from 1914. After the American season Folwartshny toured Europe with a number of other athletes; he set his personal best of 56.17 m (184.3 ft) 3 3/8 in) in Osnabrück on August 21, although he still only placed second to Germany's reigning Olympic champion Karl Hein.

Like Dreyer before him, Folwartshny represented the New York Athletic Club after graduating from Rhode Island State. Dreyer dethroned him as indoor weight throw champion in 1939, and Folwartshny also lost his outdoor hammer title that year, only placing fourth with a throw of 169 ft 9 3/4 in (51.75 m) as Chester Cruikshank won. Folwartshny never regained the weight throw championship, but did win the hammer title again in 1941, throwing 175 ft 6 1/8 in (53.49 m) and defeating the previous year's champion, fellow Maine native Stanley Johnson, by almost three feet. Folwartshny anglicized his surname to Folsworth before the 1944 national indoor championships, where he took second behind Dreyer in the weight throw. As Folsworth, he won the AAU hammer title for a fourth and final time in 1946, throwing 169 ft 8 in (51.71 m); it was the eleventh consecutive time he had placed in the top four. The streak ended that year, however, as he no longer placed in 1947; Folsworth retired from competition before the 1948 season, not pursuing selection for the Olympics in London.

Folsworth earned his living as a construction engineer, and as sales engineer and corporate vice president of Grinding Inc. in Connecticut.

=== Size ===
Despite his nickname "Shorty", Folwartshny was tall and bulky even by the standards of heavy throwers, and the press described him as a "giant". Listed as 6 ft 6 in (198 cm) and 225 pounds (102 kg) as a collegiate sophomore in 1936, Folwartshny continued to bulk up, weighing 262 pounds (119 kg) by 1947. The Association of Track and Field Statisticians gives his height as 200 cm (6 ft 7 in).

== Legacy ==
Folsworth was inducted in the University of Rhode Island Athletic Hall of Fame in 1973, in the same class as Rowe and Dreyer, and in the Maine Sports Hall of Fame in 1981, in the same class as Favor.

Records
| Preceded by (United States) Henry Dreyer | World record holder in men's 35-lb indoor weight throw 22 February 1936 – 29 February 1936 | Succeeded by (United States) Henry Dreyer |
