= Saint-Pé =

Saint-Pé may refer to:

== People ==
- Robert Saint-Pé (1899-1988), French athlete

== Places ==
- Saint-Pé-d'Ardet, a commune in southwestern France
- Saint-Pé-de-Bigorre, a commune southwestern France
- Saint-Pé-de-Bigorre station, a railway station in the commune of Saint-Pé-de-Bigorre
- Saint-Pé-de-Léren, a commune in southwestern France
- Saint-Pé-Delbosc, a commune in southwestern France
- Saint-Pé-Saint-Simon, a commune in southwestern France
