= Niles Perkins =

American athlete and physician (1919–1971)

Niles Lee Perkins, Jr. (July 1, 1919 – April 25, 1971) was an American athlete and physician. Perkins was United States champion in men's 35-lb weight throw in 1940 and held the weight throw indoor world record for nine years. He was also a good hammer thrower and football player.

== Biography ==
=== Early life and athletic career ===
Perkins was born in Augusta, Maine on July 1, 1919. He became an athlete at Cony High School in Augusta, setting a school record in the hammer and playing tackle on the football team. For one year he attended Governor Dummer Academy, where he threw the 12-pound high school hammer 201 feet in training (the national high school record was 196 feet) and was named 1938's top high school hammer thrower in the United States.

After graduating from high school Perkins went to Bowdoin College; his track coach at Bowdoin was Jack Magee, whose previous pupils included 1924 Olympic hammer throw champion Fred Tootell. At the 1939 national (AAU) junior championships Perkins placed third in the hammer and second in the 56-pound weight throw; both were won by Stan Johnson, a fellow Maine thrower. Perkins also continued to play football; he was noted as a good field goal kicker, and in one game against Colby College he scored Bowdoin's only points in a 6-0 win with his two field goals.

At the 1940 national indoor championships Perkins won the 35-lb weight throw, throwing 56 ft 1 1/2 in (17.10 m) and defeating former champions Henry Dreyer and Irving Folwartshny. Two weeks later, on March 8, 1940, Perkins threw 58 ft 7 1/2 in (17.86 m) and broke Dreyer's world record by three inches; Perkins held the world record for almost nine years, until Jim Scholtz broke it in the 1949 IC4A indoor championships. In training Perkins reportedly threw over 59 feet, and 61 feet on a fouled throw.

After two years at Bowdoin Perkins switched to the University of Maine to study engineering, and his athletic career trailed off; although he attempted to defend his indoor weight throw title at the 1941 championships, he was no longer one of the favorites, and only placed fifth as Dreyer regained the title.

=== Later life ===
In 1941 Perkins got a job as a machinist for Bath Iron Works, staying with the company until 1944 and becoming its production and planning supervisor. During the last years of World War II he served in the United States Navy, but started suffering from serious health problems, including meningitis and poliomyelitis. After recovering and receiving his discharge from the Navy in 1945 Perkins embarked on a new career as a physician, returning to Bowdoin for a one-year pre-medical course and then enrolling at Tufts University School of Medicine. He served as assistant track and field coach at both schools while studying; at Tufts, he coached Tom Bane and Bob Backus, both of whom also set indoor world records in the weight throw.

After completing his internship at the Maine General Hospital Perkins returned to Bath Iron Works, this time as an industrial physician; he also worked as a private practitioner. In 1955 he became full-time mill physician for the Oxford Paper Company. Later, he moved to Portland, where he specialized in cardiology and internal medicine; in 1965, he received the A. H. Robins Award for outstanding community service by a Maine physician. He was instrumental in the creation of the Penobscot Bay Medical Center, and became its first executive director.

Perkins drowned in the Miramichi River in New Brunswick, Canada on April 25, 1971 while on a fishing trip. His canoe capsized, and in heavy clothes in the cold water he was unable to swim to safety; although he was presumed to have drowned, his fate was not known with certainty until his body was found washed up on the shore in Blackville, New Brunswick some time later.

After Perkins's death, the Penobscot Bay Medical Center named its ambulatory care unit and library after him. Perkins was posthumously inducted in the Maine Sports Hall of Fame in 1982.

Records
Preceded by (United States) Henry Dreyer	World record holder in men's 35-lb indoor weight throw 8 March 1940 – 26 February 1949	Succeeded by (United States) James Scholtz
