= Athletics at the 1936 Summer Olympics – Men's hammer throw =

Olympic athletics event

Men's hammer throw at the Games of the XI Olympiad
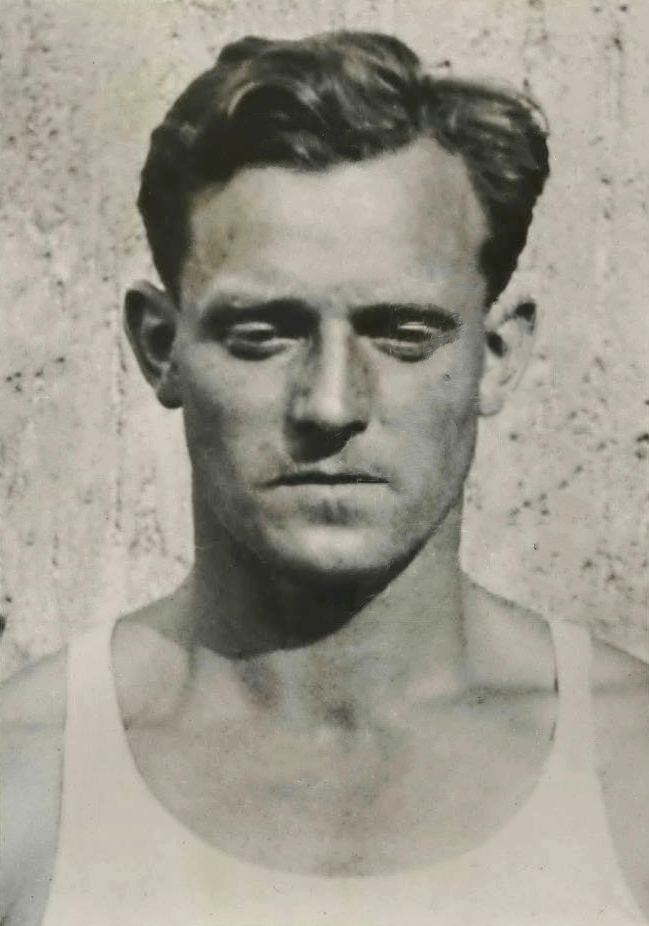
- Karl Hein
- Venue: Olympiastadion
- Date: August 3, 1936
- Competitors: 27 from 16 nations
- Winning distance: 56.49 OR

Medalists
1st place, gold medalist(s)		Karl Hein; Germany
2nd place, silver medalist(s)		Erwin Blask; Germany
3rd place, bronze medalist(s)		Fred Warngård; Sweden

The men's hammer throw event was part of the track and field athletics programme at the 1936 Summer Olympics. The competition took place on August 3, 1936, with 27 competitors from 16 nations. The maximum number of athletes per nation had been set at 3 since the 1930 Olympic Congress. The final was won by Karl Hein of Germany. The silver medal went to Erwin Blask, also of Germany. They were the first medals for Germany in the event; Germany was also the first country other than the United States to have two medalists in the event in the same Games. Fred Warngård of Sweden took bronze. The United States' eight-Games medal streak in the hammer throw was snapped, with the Americans' best result being William Rowe's fifth place.

== Background ==
This was the ninth appearance of the event, which has been held at every Summer Olympics except 1896. One of the six finalists from the 1932 Games returned: silver medalist Ville Pörhölä of Finland, who had also won the shot put in 1920. Two-time defending champion Pat O'Callaghan of Ireland would have competed and been favored to match John Flanagan's three gold medals, but disputes over the status of sport governing bodies on the island of Ireland resulted in the Olympic Federation of Ireland boycotting the 1936 Games.

Austria, Czechoslovakia, Estonia, Greece, and Yugoslavia each made their debut in the event. The United States appeared for the ninth time, the only nation to have competed at each appearance of the event to that point.

== Competition format ==
The competition introduced a true two-round format, with the qualifying round completely separate from the divided final (though the official report describes the competition as having three phases, with the final being a "semi-finals" and "final"). In qualifying, each athlete received three attempts; those recording a mark of at least 46.00 metres advanced to the final. The results of the qualifying round were then ignored. Finalists received three throws each, with the top six competitors receiving an additional three attempts. The best distance among those six throws counted.

== Records ==
These were the standing world and Olympic records (in metres) prior to the 1936 Summer Olympics.

World record	Patrick Ryan (USA)	57.77	New York City, United States	17 August 1913
Olympic record	Matt McGrath (USA)	54.74	Stockholm, Sweden	14 July 1912

Erwin Blask set a new Olympic record with 55.04 metres in his second throw of the final. Fred Warngård beat the old record in his fourth throw, but was still behind Blask. Karl Hein won the gold medal with a new Olympic record throw of 56.49 metres in his last throw of the competition.

== Schedule ==
Date	Time	Round
Monday, 2 August 1936	9:00; 15:00	Qualifying; Final

== Results ==
=== Qualifying ===
Rank	Athlete	Nation	Distance	Notes
1–17	Isao Abe	Japan	>= 46.00	Q
1–17	Koit Annamaa	Estonia	>= 46.00	Q
1–17	Anton Barticevic	Chile	>= 46.00	Q
1–17	Erwin Blask	Germany	>= 46.00	Q
1–17	Giovanni Cantagalli	Italy	>= 46.00	Q
1–17	Henry Dreyer	United States	>= 46.00	Q
1–17	Donald Favor	United States	>= 46.00	Q
1–17	Bernhard Greulich	Germany	>= 46.00	Q
1–17	Karl Hein	Germany	>= 46.00	Q
1–17	Sulo Heino	Finland	>= 46.00	Q
1–17	Gunnar Jansson	Sweden	>= 46.00	Q
1–17	Gustaf Alfons Koutonen	Finland	>= 46.00	Q
1–17	Evert Linné	Sweden	>= 46.00	Q
1–17	Ville Pörhölä	Finland	>= 46.00	Q
1–17	William Rowe	United States	>= 46.00	Q
1–17	Fred Warngård	Sweden	>= 46.00	Q
1–17	Joseph Wirtz	France	>= 46.00	Q
18–27	Christos Dimitropoulos	Greece	<46.00	
18–27	Norman Drake	Great Britain	<46.00	
18–27	Jaroslav Eliáš	Czechoslovakia	<46.00	
18–27	Pedro Goić	Yugoslavia	<46.00	
18–27	Hans Houtzager	Netherlands	<46.00	
18–27	Emil Janausch	Austria	<46.00	
18–27	Jaroslav Knotek	Czechoslovakia	<46.00	
18–27	Eiichiro Matsuno	Japan	<46.00	
18–27	Assis Naban	Brazil	<46.00	
18–27	Milan Stepišnik	Yugoslavia	<46.00	

=== Final ===
Rank	Athlete	Nation	1	2	3	4	5	6	Distance	Notes
1st place, gold medalist(s)	Karl Hein	Germany	52.13	52.44	X	54.70	54.85	56.49 OR	56.49	OR
2nd place, silver medalist(s)	Erwin Blask	Germany	52.55	55.04 OR	X	54.10	54.48	X	55.04	
3rd place, bronze medalist(s)	Fred Warngård	Sweden	52.05	52.98	54.03	54.83	53.30	50.61	54.83	
4	Gustaf Alfons Koutonen	Finland	X	50.01	51.90	49.11	49.91	X	51.90	
5	William Rowe	United States	51.53	51.04	49.29	50.32	51.66	X	51.66	
6	Donald Favor	United States	50.78	50.02	51.01	48.48	50.33	47.71	51.01	
7	Bernhard Greulich	Germany	50.19	X	50.61	Did not advance			50.61	
8	Koit Annamaa	Estonia	48.77	49.54	50.46	Did not advance			50.46	
9	Henry Dreyer	United States	49.81	X	50.42	Did not advance			50.42	
10	Sulo Heino	Finland	49.93	47.15	48.30	Did not advance			49.93	
11	Ville Pörhölä	Finland	45.35	X	49.89	Did not advance			49.89	
12	Gunnar Jansson	Sweden	49.21	48.49	49.28	Did not advance			49.28	
13	Isao Abe	Japan	47.40	41.83	49.01	Did not advance			49.01	
14	Evert Linné	Sweden	X	47.25	47.61	Did not advance			47.61	
15	Giovanni Cantagalli	Italy	45.21	47.42	45.08	Did not advance			47.42	
16	Joseph Wirtz	France	X	44.82	45.69	Did not advance			45.69	
17	Anton Barticevic	Chile	X	43.02	45.23	Did not advance			45.23	
