= 1938 European Athletics Championships – Men's hammer throw =

Men's hammer throw at the European Athletics Championships

The men's hammer throw at the 1938 European Athletics Championships was held in Paris, France, at Stade Olympique de Colombes on 4 September 1938.

== Medalists ==
Gold	Karl Hein; Germany
Silver	Erwin Blask; Germany
Bronze	Oscar Malmbrandt; Sweden

== Results ==
=== Final ===
4 September

Rank	Name	Nationality	Result	Notes
1st place, gold medalist(s)	Karl Hein	Germany	58.77	CR
2nd place, silver medalist(s)	Erwin Blask	Germany	57.34	
3rd place, bronze medalist(s)	Oscar Malmbrandt	Sweden	51.23	
4	Gösta Hannula	Finland	49.84	
5	Joseph Wirtz	France	48.75	
6	Silvio Nido	Switzerland	46.68	
7	Jussi Anttalainen	Finland	44.59	
8	Robert Saint-Pé	France	42.61	

== Participation ==
According to an unofficial count, 8 athletes from 5 countries participated in the event.

- Finland (2)
- France (2)
- Germany (2)
- Sweden (1)
- Switzerland (1)
