= Jack Magee =

American track and field coach

John Joseph Magee (January 12, 1883 – January 1, 1968) was an American track and field coach. He was head coach at Bowdoin College from 1913 to 1955 and assistant coach of the United States Olympic track and field team in 1924, 1928 and 1932.

== Biography ==
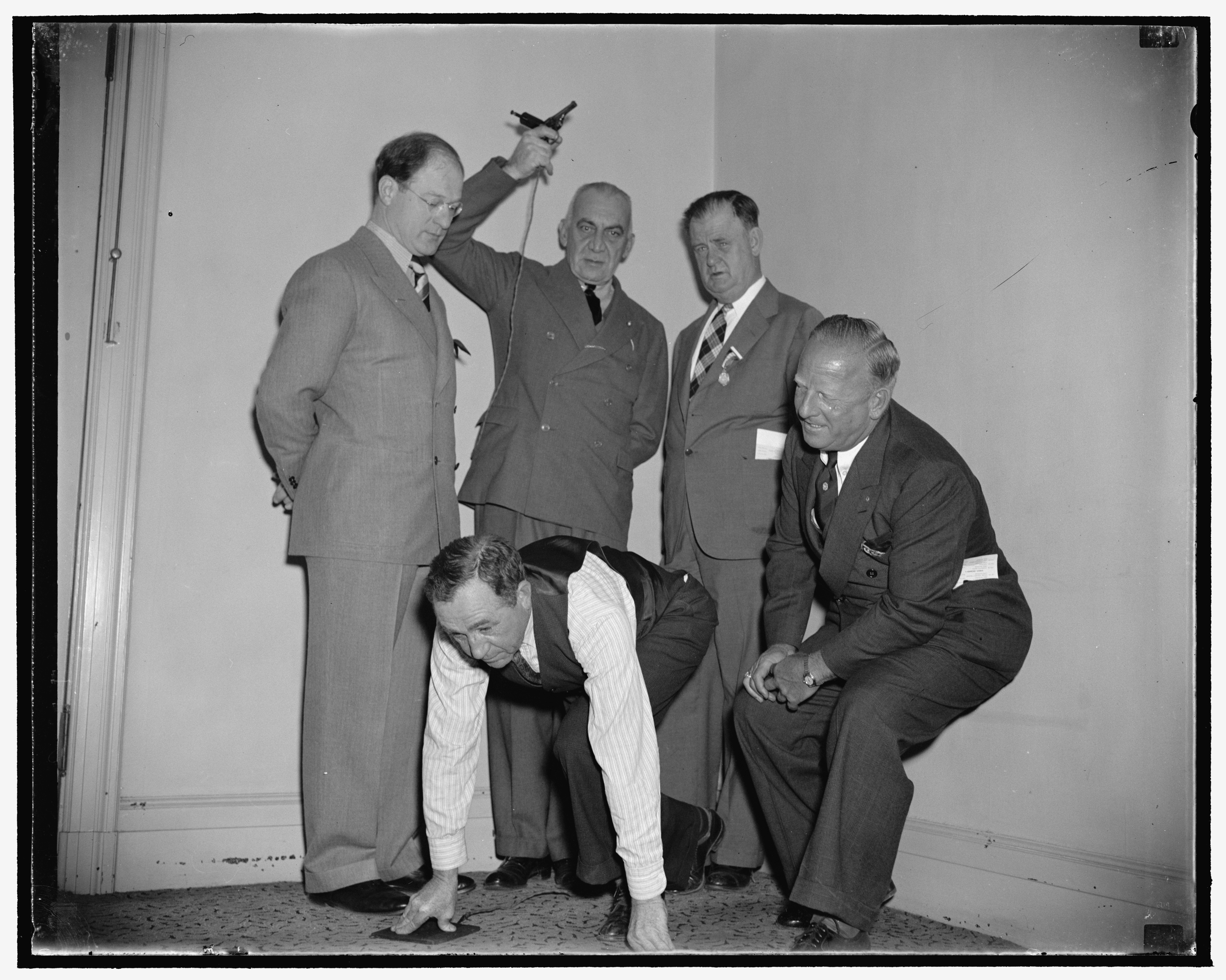
Magee kneeling

Magee was born in Newark, New Jersey, on January 12, 1883, but grew up in East Boston, where he was a sprinter in school. He briefly coached at Powder Point School in Duxbury, Massachusetts before moving to Bowdoin College in 1913. Magee was in charge of the Bowdoin track team for the following forty-two years, with some interruptions; in 1918 he received a year's leave of absence to train the American army in France, and was wounded during his time there.

Magee's Bowdoin teams won the New England championship four times and the Maine state championship twenty times. His most successful pupil was 1924 Olympic hammer throw champion and long-time Rhode Island track head coach Fred Tootell; other top athletes coached by Magee at Bowdoin included weight throw world-best holder Niles Perkins and 1934 IC4A high hurdles champion Phil Good. Magee coached the American national team in dual meets against the British Empire in 1932 and 1933, as well as on tours of the Far East (1934) and Scandinavia (1937). He served as an assistant coach on the U.S. Olympic track and field teams of 1924, 1928 and 1932; he was also with the team in 1920, but was not one of the official assistant coaches that year. Magee lobbied for an American boycott of the 1936 Olympics, held in Nazi Germany; he turned down the opportunity to be an Olympic team coach again as a protest after the decision not to boycott was made.

Magee was one of the founders of the Maine branch of the Amateur Athletic Union (AAU); he was elected vice president of the national AAU in 1932 and re-elected the following year. He also served as president of the Association of College Track Coaches of America and was a long-time member of the Maine State Boxing Commission. After his retirement in 1955 Magee was named emeritus director of track and field at Bowdoin; he died in Brunswick, Maine on January 1, 1968, aged 84.

== Legacy ==
Magee was inducted in the Helms Hall of Fame in 1949. The track at Bowdoin's Whittier Field stadium is named after Magee, as is Jack Magee's Pub & Grill on the Bowdoin campus.
