= Erwin Blask =

German hammer thrower (1910–1999)

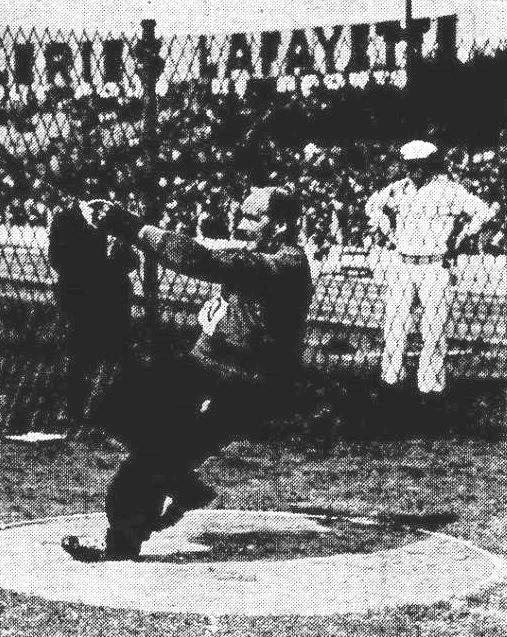
- Blask in 1938

Personal information
- Born: 20 March 1910 Friedrichsheyde, East Prussia
- Died: 6 February 1999 (aged 88) Frankfurt, Germany
Medal record
Men's athletics
Representing Germany
Olympic Games
Silver medal – second place	1936 Berlin	Hammer throw
European Championships
Silver medal – second place	1938 Paris	Hammer throw

Erwin Blask (March 20, 1910 – February 6, 1999) was a German athlete who competed mainly in the hammer throw event. He won the silver medal for Germany at the 1936 Summer Olympics.

== Biography ==
Blask was born in Friedrichsheyde, East Prussia (today Gajrowskie, Poland)

At the 1936 Olympic Games in Berlin, Blask won the silver medal in the men's hammer throw competition behind his fellow German Karl Hein.

Blask finished second behind Karl Hein again in the hammer throw event at the British 1937 AAA Championships.

He died in Frankfurt am Main.

Records
Preceded by (United States) Pat Ryan	Men's Hammer World Record Holder; 27 August 1938 – 14 July 1948	Succeeded by (Hungary) Imre Németh
