= Greulich =

Greulich is a surname of German origin. Notable people with the surname include:

- Augustus Greulich (1813-1893), German-born American politician
- Bernhard Greulich (1902–1995), German athlete
- Billy Greulich (born 1991), British footballer
- Helmut Greulich (1923-1993), German politician (SPD)
- Hermann Greulich (1842-1925), Swiss politician
