= Sulo =

Sulo may refer to:

== People ==
- Sulo (singer) (born 1969), Swedish vocalist and songwriter
- Sulo Aittoniemi (1936–2016), Finnish politician
- Sulo Bärlund (1910–1986), Finnish shot putter
- Sulo Cederström (1903–1944), Finnish sports shooter
- Sulo Heino (1908–1996), Finnish athlete
- Sulo Jääskeläinen (1890–1942), Finnish skier
- Sulo Ketola (born 2007), Finnish footballer
- Sulo Leppänen (1916–2015), Finnish wrestler
- Sulo Nurmela (1908–1999), Finnish cross-country skier
- Sulo Parkkinen (1930–2013), Finnish football player
- Sulo Salmi (1914–1984), Finnish gymnast
- Sulo Salo (1909–1995), Finnish football player
- Sulo Suorttanen (1921–2005), Finnish politician
- Sulo Teittinen (1882–1964), Finnish politician
- Sulo Vaattovaara (born 1967), Swedish football player

== Other ==
- Sulo (company), a German/French environmental technology company, formerly Plastic Omnium Environment, a division of OPmobility
