= Los Lobos del Este de Los Angeles =

Los Lobos del Este de Los Angeles (Just another band from East L.A.)

Studio album by Los Lobos
- Released: 1978
- Recorded: 1977
- Studio: D&B Studios, Burbank, California; Associated Recorders, Hollywood, California
- Genre: Latin rock; chicano rock; Tex-Mex
- Length: 39:25
- Label: New Vista Production; Hollywood (Reissue)
- Producer: Luis R. Torres, David Sandoval, Los Lobos del Este de Los Angeles

Los Lobos chronology
Los Lobos del Este de Los Angeles (Just another band from East L.A.) (1978)	...And a Time to Dance (1983)

Alternative cover
- 2000 Hollywood Records reissue

Professional ratings
Review scores
Source	Rating
AllMusic	3/5 stars
Rolling Stone	2.5/5 stars
The New Rolling Stone Album Guide	3/5 stars

Los Lobos del Este de Los Angeles (Just another band from East L.A.) is the debut album by the American band Los Lobos, at the time known as Los Lobos del Este de Los Angeles. It was self-released by the band in early 1978 and features mostly traditional Mexican folk music. The album was recorded live to 16-track and represented the band's live repertoire at the time, which included their original song, "Flor de Huevo", an instrumental written by guitarist David Hidalgo. It was reissued on CD in 2000 by Hollywood Records with one bonus track.

== Track listing ==
No.	Title	Writer(s)	Length
1.	"El Canelo" (son jarocho)	Jacinto Gatica	3:47
2.	"El Pescado Nadador" (ranchera)	Antonio Rosas, Miguel Aceves Mejía	2:43
3.	"Sabor a Mí" (bolero)	Álvaro Carrillo	3:51
4.	"Flor de Huevo" (son locos)	David Hidalgo	1:54
5.	"Cielito Lindo" / "Cielito Lindo Huasteco" (canción mexicana / son huasteco)	Quirino Mendoza y Cortés / Elpidio Ramírez	3:44
6.	"La Iguana" (son jarocho)	Gatica	3:21
7.	"El Cuchipe" (canción boliviana)	Eduardo Gómez Bueno	2:21
8.	"Imploración" (bolero ranchero)	Mario Camacho	2:33
9.	"Guantanamera" (guajira)	Joseíto Fernández, José Martí	4:48
10.	"La Feria de las Flores" (ranchera)	Chucho Monge	2:42
11.	"Maria Chuchena" (son jarocho)	Bueno, Ismael Orozco	3:57

2000 CD-reissue bonus track
No.	Title	Writer(s)	Length
12.	"El Bon Bon de Elena" (plena)	Rafael Cepeda	3:39

== Personnel ==
Los Lobos del Este de Los Angeles

- David Hidalgo – guitar, requinto romantico, requinto jarocho, mandola, tres, cuatro, violin, percussion, lead vocals (5, 11)
- Cesar Rosas – guitar, mandolin, jarana, requinto romantico, lead vocals (1–3, 6–8, 10–12)
- Conrad Lozano – bass, guitarrón, lead vocals (9)
- Louie Pérez – guitar, jarana, charango, vihuela, percussion

Additional musicians

- Charlie Tovar – congas, percussion (3, 9)

Production

- Luis R. Torres – producer
- David Sandoval – producer, photography
- Los Lobos del Este de Los Angeles – producer, instrumental arrangements
- Patrick Flynn – engineer
- Mark Fleisher – engineer, mixing
- Edward W. Randell Jr. – graphics
- Mary Pérez – photography
- Rudy Rodriquez – photography
- Kevin Bartley – remastering (2000 reissue)
- Cesar Rosas – photography, remix (12), remastering (2000 reissue)
- Brian Soucy – remix (12)
