= Donald Favor =

American hammer thrower

Donald Emerson Favor (February 16, 1913 – November 13, 1984) was an American hammer thrower. He was national champion in 1934 and placed sixth at the 1936 Summer Olympics.

== Career ==
Representing the University of Maine, Favor won the hammer throw at the 1934 IC4A championships, throwing 170 ft 9 in (52.04 m) and narrowly defeating Rhode Island State's Henry Dreyer. At the NCAA championships later that summer Favor placed third, losing to Dreyer and 1932 Olympic bronze medalist Peter Zaremba (who had been third in the IC4A meet), but at the national (AAU) championships Favor again defeated both Zaremba and Dreyer, throwing 163 ft 5 3/4 in (49.82 m) for his first and only national title.

After completing his studies Favor became a teacher at his former high school, Deering High in Portland, Maine, but he continued throwing. He did not enter the 1936 Olympic season as a favorite to qualify for the American team, but at the Eastern Tryouts, a semi-final qualifying meet, he threw 177 ft 4 in (54.05 m), which was his personal best. At the final Olympic Trials Favor threw 167 ft 6 in (51.05 m) and placed third behind Dreyer and another Rhode Islander, Bill Rowe; he qualified for the Olympics by less than eight inches, his margin over Chester Cruikshank, who placed fourth.

At the Olympics in Berlin Favor qualified for the final, where he threw 51.01 m (167 ft 4 11/16 in) and placed sixth. He was the second-best American, behind Rowe but ahead of Dreyer.
