= Eiichiro =

- Gender: Male

Origin
- Origin: Japanese
- Meaning: Different meanings depending on the kanji used

Eiichiro, Eiichirō, Eiichirou or Eiichiroh (written: 英一郎, 栄一郎 or 瑛一郎) is a masculine Japanese given name. Notable people with the name include:

- Eiichiro Azuma, American historian
- Eiichiro Komatsu (小松 英一郎; born 1974), Japanese scientist
- Eiichiro Funakoshi (船越 英一郎; born 1960), Japanese actor and television personality
- Eiichirō Hasumi (羽住 英一郎; born 1967), Japanese film director
- Ishida Eiichirō (石田 英一郞; 1903–1968), Japanese folklorist and ethnologist
- Eiichiro Matsuno (松野 栄一郎; born 1914), Japanese hammer thrower
- Eiichiro Oda (尾田 栄一郎; born 1975), Japanese manga artist
- Eiichiro Ozaki (尾崎 瑛一郎; born 1984), Japanese footballer
- Eiichiro Washio (鷲尾 英一郎; born 1977), Japanese politician
