= Karl Hein =

Karl Hein may refer to:

- Karl Hein (athlete) (1908–1982), German hammer thrower
- Karl Hein (footballer) (born 2002), Estonian footballer
