= Fred Warngård =

Swedish athlete

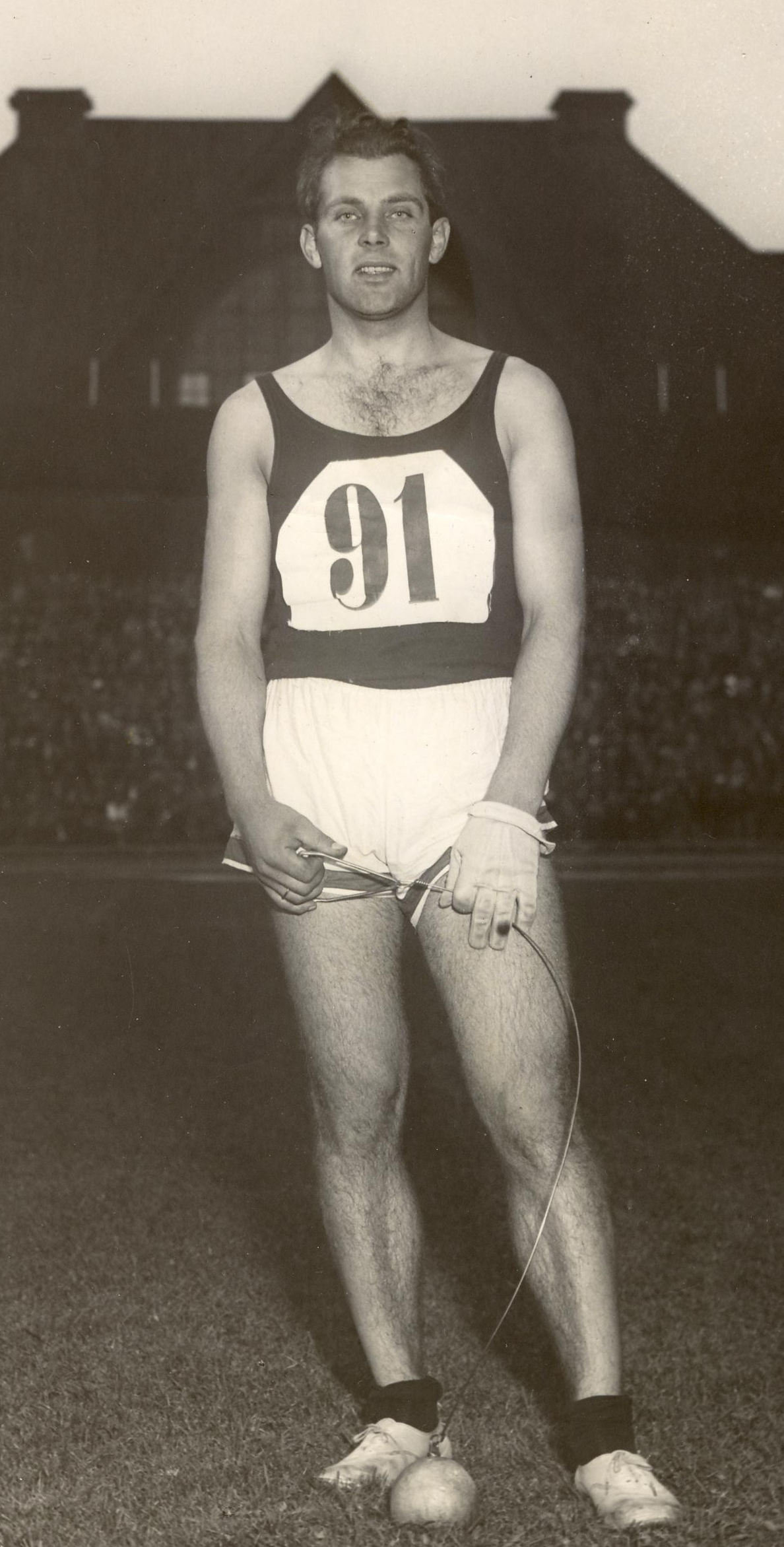

Personal information
- Born: 9 May 1907 Västra Ingelstad, Sweden
- Died: 23 May 1950 (aged 43) Malmö, Sweden

Sport
- Sport: Athletics
- Event: Hammer throw
- Club: Malmö AI

Achievements and titles
- Personal best: 54.83 m (1936)
Medal record
Representing Sweden
Olympic Games
Bronze medal – third place	1936 Berlin	Hammer throw

Oskar Alfred Daniel "Fred" Warngård (9 May 1907 – 23 May 1950) was a Swedish hammer thrower. He won a bronze medal at the 1936 Summer Olympics setting a national record at 54.83 m.

== Biography ==
Warngård held the national titles in the hammer throw (1936 and 1938) and weight throw (1936 and 1939). He was a criminal detective by profession.

Warngård won the British AAA Championships title in the hammer throw event at the 1935 AAA Championships.
