= John Murdoch (athlete) =

Canadian athlete

Personal information
- Nationality: Canadian
- Born: 25 September 1885 Aberdeenshire, Great Britain
- Died: 7 November 1939 (aged 54) Vancouver, Canada

Sport
- Sport: Athletics
- Event: Hammer throw

John Murdoch (25 September 1885 – 7 November 1939) was a Canadian athlete. He competed in the men's hammer throw at the 1924 Summer Olympics.
