= Chester Cruikshank =

American track and field athlete and military officer

Chester "Chet" Cruikshank (May 25, 1913 – November 1970) was an American track and field athlete. Cruikshank was national champion in men's hammer throw in 1939 and 1942 and national junior champion in 1935; he was also a good discus thrower. During World War II he rose to the rank of lieutenant colonel and was awarded the Distinguished Service Cross for his actions in the Battle of Anzio.

== Athletic career ==
Cruikshank became a top track athlete at Ault High School and remained so at Colorado State University. His main events were the hammer throw and the discus throw, but he also competed in other events, including shot put and high jump. In addition, he played as an end on the Colorado State Rams football team, winning conference football titles in 1933 and 1934.

At the 1933 NCAA championships Cruikshank placed second in the hammer throw, throwing 155 ft 11 1/4 in (47.52 m) and losing to Roderick Cox of Michigan by only an inch and a half. At the national (AAU) championships later that summer Cruikshank threw 160 ft 6 7/8 in (48.94 m) and finished as the top American; however, he still only placed second to Olympic champion Pat O'Callaghan of Ireland, who was also taking part and won the title. In the 1934 NCAA meet Cruikshank threw the hammer 163 ft 10 3/4 in (49.95 m), but lost to Henry Dreyer, Pete Zaremba and Donald Favor; the top five all threw well beyond the previous year's winning mark. In the discus Cruikshank placed sixth.

Cruikshank set his personal discus best, 160.45 feet (48.90 m), in May 1935; it was also a Rocky Mountain Conference record, but only briefly, as Hugh Cannon broke it the following week. Cruikshank was allowed to compete in the 1935 NCAA championships, even though he was in his fourth year of collegiate track and field competition; at the time, collegiate eligibility was normally limited to three years per sport, and Cruikshank had been taking part in varsity track meets since his freshman year. He was a leading favorite in the hammer throw, but despite throwing 159 ft 10 1/4 in (48.72 m) he lost to Anton Kishon of Bates by almost nine feet and took second. In the discus he placed seventh. At the 1935 AAU championships Cruikshank won the junior hammer title; in the senior competition, he threw 165 ft 6 1/2 in (50.45 m) and placed second to Dreyer.

Cruikshank entered the 1936 season as one of the favorites to qualify for the American team for the Olympics in Berlin, but at that summer's Olympic Trials his best throw of 166 ft 10 5/8 in (50.87 m) was only good enough for fourth place. He lost to Donald Favor, who got the third and final Olympic spot, by less than eight inches. Cruikshank won his first national senior hammer title in the 1939 championships, throwing 174 ft 1 1/2 in (53.07 m). At the 1940 championships he threw 176 ft 3 1/4 in (53.72 m), which was and would remain his personal best, but he still only placed third behind Stanley Johnson and Bob Bennett. Cruikshank won his second national title in 1942 while on leave from the U.S. Army, throwing 173 ft 8 1/2 in (52.94 m) and beating defending champion Irving Folwartshny by more than five feet.

Due to World War II Cruikshank missed the national championships of 1943 and 1944, but he returned in 1945 and immediately placed fourth despite not having trained much during the war years; the low quality of that year's competition helped, as he only needed to throw 147 ft 9 1/2 in (45.04 m), the lowest fourth-place mark since 1926. He continued competing for several more years, placing in the top six at the national championships in every year until 1948; he also placed sixth, with a throw of 161 ft 5 3/4 in (49.22 m), at the 1948 Olympic Trials.

Cruikshank was inducted into the Colorado State University Athletics Hall of Fame in 1995 for his achievements in football and track and field.

== Military career ==
Cruikshank joined the military through Colorado State University's Reserve Officers' Training Corps program, serving in the Colorado Army National Guard before it was federalized. During World War II he originally served in the 157th Infantry Regiment, formed out of the Colorado National Guard, and later in the 180th Infantry Regiment; he first saw action in Italy in the summer of 1943 as a major of the 180th Infantry. In the Battle of Anzio in 1944 Cruikshank led his battalion as a lieutenant colonel, earning a Distinguished Service Cross for his actions in the battle. Cruikshank also earned both the Bronze Star and the Silver Star during the war.
