= Anton Barticevic =

Chilean hammer thrower

Personal information
- Nationality: Chilean
- Born: 2 May 1906

Sport
- Sport: Athletics
- Event: Hammer throw

Anton Barticevic (born 2 May 1906, date of death unknown) was a Chilean athlete. He competed in the men's hammer throw at the 1936 Summer Olympics.
