= Karl Jensen (athlete) =

Danish athletics competitor

Personal information
- Nationality: Danish
- Born: 21 September 1898
- Died: 28 July 1928 (aged 29)

Sport
- Sport: Athletics
- Events: Discus throw Hammer throw

Karl Jensen (21 September 1898 – 28 July 1928) was a Danish athlete. He competed in the men's discus throw and the men's hammer throw at the 1924 Summer Olympics.
