= Los Madrugadores =

Los Madrugadores (English: "The Dawn Risers") were a popular Spanish-language musical group based in Los Angeles, California during the early 1930s.

Originally a duo of brothers Victor and Jesus Sanchez, the group became a trio after adding musician and radio personality Pedro J. González and eventually adding Fernando Linares to its lineup. One of the most successful acts in its genre, the group recorded over 200 songs for a variety of recording companies, including U.S. giants RCA Victor, Columbia, and Decca as well as niche and subsidiary companies such as Vocalion, RCA label Bluebird, Imperial, and Tricolor.
