= Gustaf Alfons Koutonen =

Finnish hammer thrower

Personal information
- Nationality: Finnish
- Born: 17 August 1910 Helsinki, Finland
- Died: 8 July 1977 (aged 66) Helsinki, Finland

Sport
- Sport: Athletics
- Event: Hammer throw

Gustaf Alfons Koutonen (17 August 1910 – 8 July 1977) was a Finnish athlete. He competed in the men's hammer throw at the 1936 Summer Olympics.
