= Pierre Zaïdin =

French hammer thrower

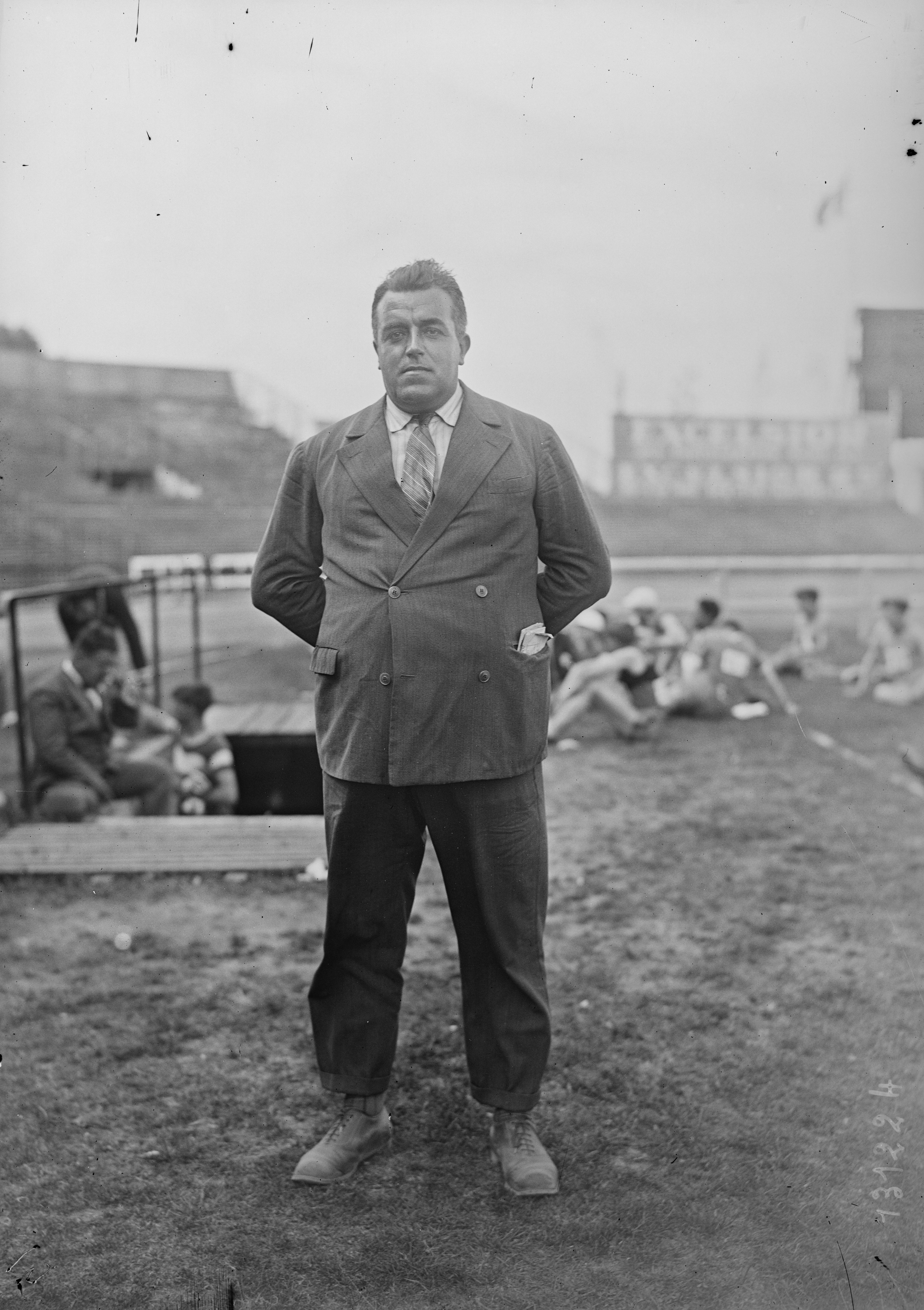

Personal information
- Full name: Pedro Santiago "Pierre" Zaïdin
- Nationality: French
- Born: 26 May 1893 Coscojuela de Fantova, El Grado, Huesca, Spain
- Died: 2 October 1956 (aged 63) Boujan-sur-Libron, Hérault, France

Sport
- Sport: Athletics
- Event: Hammer throw

Pierre Zaïdin (26 May 1893 – 2 October 1956) was a French athlete. He competed in the men's hammer throw at the 1924 Summer Olympics.
