= Gajrowskie =

- Village
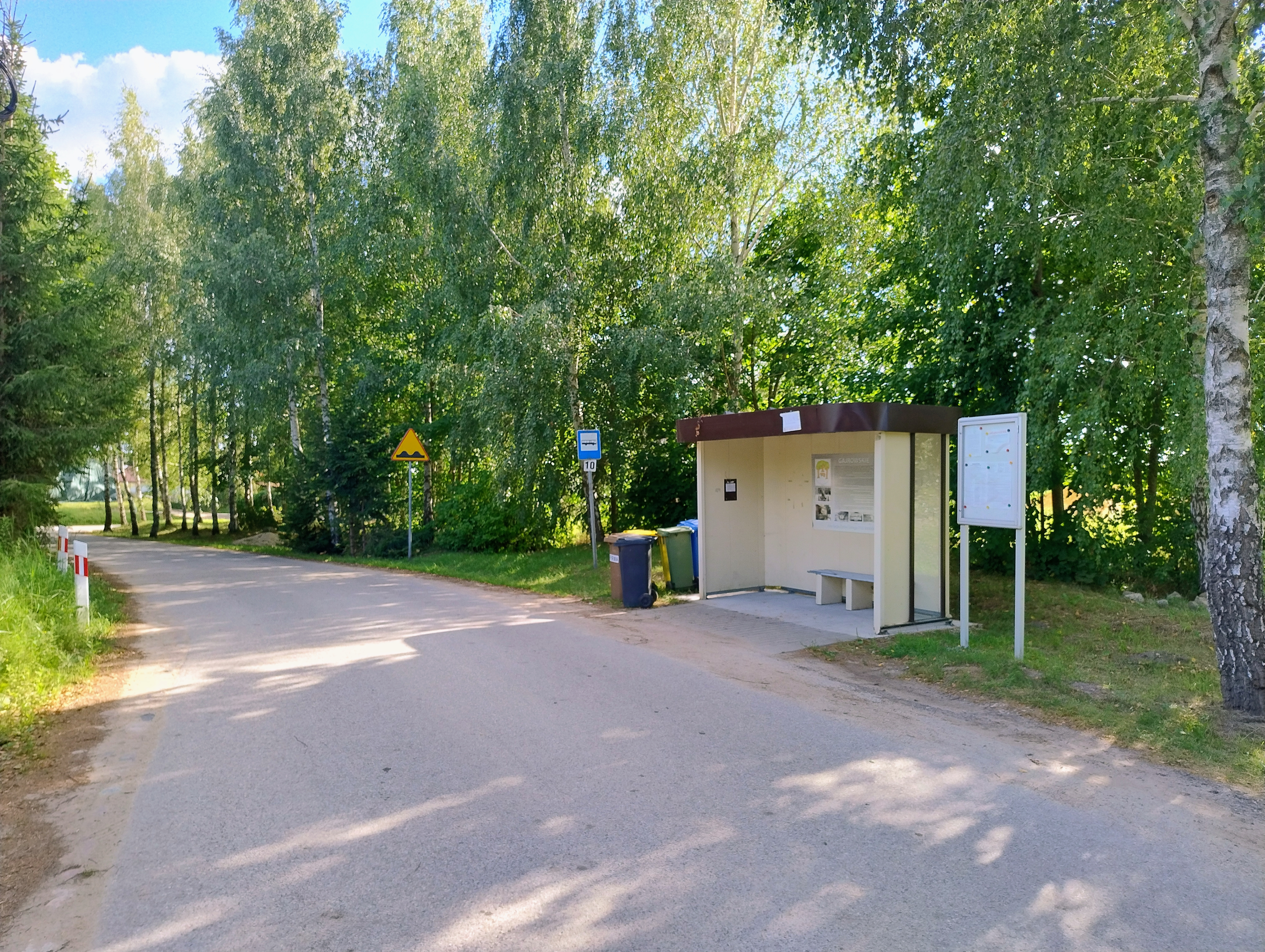

- Location within Poland
- Coordinates: 54°3′N 22°12′E
- Country: Poland
- Voivodeship: Warmian-Masurian
- County: Giżycko
- Gmina: Wydminy
- Time zone: UTC+1 (CET)
  - Summer (DST): UTC+2 (CEST)
- Vehicle registration: NGI

Gajrowskie [ɡai̯ˈrɔfskʲɛ] (German: Friedrichsheyde, 1938–1945: Friedrichsheide) is a village in the administrative district of Gmina Wydminy, within Giżycko County, Warmian-Masurian Voivodeship, in north-eastern Poland. It is located in the region of Masuria.

== History ==
In the past, the village was also known in Polish as Gajrówka and Gerejówki.

On 16 February 1946, it was the site of the Battle of Gajrowskie, the largest battle between Polish anti-communist partisans and communist forces in Masuria.

== Notable residents ==
- Erwin Blask (1910-1999), German athlete
