= Montaut–Bétharram station =

Railway station in Montaut, France

Coordinates: 43°07′36″N 0°11′53″W

Montaut-Bétharram is a railway station serving Montaut and Lestelle-Bétharram, Nouvelle-Aquitaine, France. The station is located on the Toulouse – Bayonne railway line. The station is served by TER (local) services operated by the SNCF.

== Train services ==
The station is served by regional trains towards Bordeaux, Bayonne, Pau and Tarbes.

Preceding station	TER Nouvelle-Aquitaine	Following station
Coarraze-Nay towards Bordeaux	52	Saint-Pé-de-Bigorre towards Tarbes
Coarraze-Nay towards Bayonne	53	Saint-Pé-de-Bigorre towards Tarbes
