= Evert Linné =

Swedish hammer thrower

Personal information
- Nationality: Swedish
- Born: 1 September 1910 Eskilstuna, Sweden
- Died: 14 December 1969 (aged 59) Borås, Sweden

Sport
- Sport: Athletics
- Event: Hammer throw

Evert Linné (1 September 1910 – 14 December 1969) was a Swedish athlete. He competed in the men's hammer throw at the 1936 Summer Olympics.
