= Whittier Field =

Outdoor stadium of Bowdoin College in Brunswick, Maine

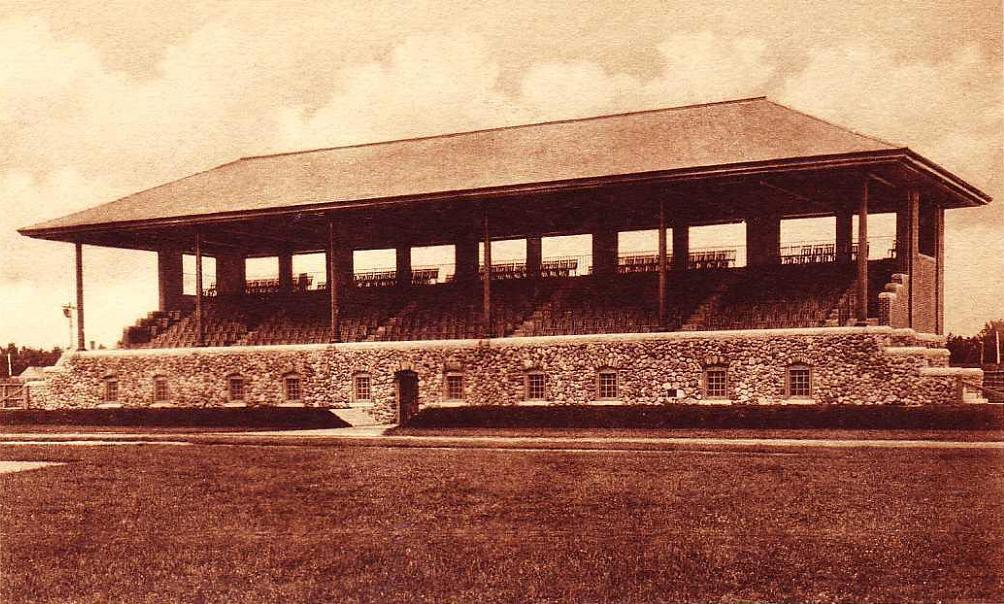
- Hubbard Grandstand, at Whittier Field
- Interactive map of Whittier Field
- Location: Brunswick, Maine, U.S.
- Coordinates: 43°54′29.25″N 69°57′18.37″W
- Owner: Bowdoin College
- Operator: Bowdoin College
- Capacity: 9,000

Construction
- Opened: October 1896 (field); June 1904 (grandstand)

Tenant
- Bowdoin Polar Bears football

Whittier Field is the outdoor stadium of Bowdoin College. Located in Brunswick, Maine, it is the field for Bowdoin football, Bowdoin outdoor track and field, and the Maine Distance Festival. The Whittier Field Athletic Complex was added to the National Register of Historic Places in June 2017.

== Whittier Athletic Field ==
Designed by and named for Bowdoin College alumnus and professor Frank N. Whittier, the field opened on October 3, 1896, with a football game between Bowdoin and Maine State College (now the Black Bears of the University of Maine). Whittier's interest in athletics also led him to help with the design and construction of the new Sargent Gymnasium and Hyde Athletic Building (now known as the Smith Union).

== Hubbard Grandstand ==
The Hubbard Grandstand was designed and built in 1903. The original grandstands are 122 feet long, 37 feet wide and seat nearly 600 people. The Grandstand was dedicated on June 22, 1904. Total capacity of all the seating is 9,000. It was designed in the Shingle Style.

== Jack Magee Track ==
The track around the field was built in 1970 as a tribute to Bowdoin coach Jack Magee, who retired in 1955. The six lane all-weather track was renovated during the summer of 2005 with a grant from the Nike corporation.

=== Olympic history ===
The Magee Track was the site of a 1972 Olympic Training Camp that brought American Olympic athletes including Steve Prefontaine to Bowdoin for the summer before the Munich Olympics.

The track was the home track for Joan Benoit Samuelson, a 1981 Bowdoin graduate and the 1984 Olympic Gold Medal Marathon champion.
