= Henry Dreyer =

American athlete (1911–1986)

Henry Francis Dreyer (February 2, 1911 – May 27, 1986) was an American athlete. He competed in the 1936 and 1948 Summer Olympics as a hammer thrower; his other strong event was the non-Olympic weight throw, in which he broke the world record several times. Between the two events and counting both outdoors and indoors, he won twenty United States championships.

== Sports career ==
=== Early career and 1936 Olympics ===
Dreyer won his first national title in 1934, winning the 35 lb weight throw at that year's AAU indoor championships with a throw of 53 ft 8 in (16.35 m). Representing Rhode Island State College, he also won the 1934 indoor IC4A weight throw title, throwing 55 ft 2 1/4 in (16.82 m), a world record. At that summer's NCAA championships he won the hammer throw, throwing 169 ft 8 3/8 in (51.73 m) and defeating 1932 Olympic bronze medalist Pete Zaremba; only Fred Tootell, the 1924 Olympic champion and Dreyer's coach, had ever thrown farther at the NCAA meet.

In 1935 Dreyer broke his own world record in the 35-pound indoor weight throw with 57 ft 9 in (17.60 m) and repeated as national champion in the event. He also won his first national outdoor title, winning the hammer throw with 168 ft 8 1/2 in (51.42 m). The previous week he had thrown 181 ft 5 3/16 in (55.30 m) at the New England championships in Newport, the best throw in the world that year.

On 29 February 1936 he threw the indoor weight 58 ft 4 1/2 in (17.79 m), regaining the world record from Irving Folwartshny, who had thrown 58 ft 1 1/2 in (17.71 m) at the national championships the previous week. He only placed third in the hammer at that year's national championships, losing to two other Rhode Island State alumni, William Rowe and Folwartshny. However, at the Olympic Trials, which were held separately the following week, he threw 171 ft 11 1/2 in (52.41 m) and won by two inches over Rowe, qualifying for the Olympics in Berlin. He placed ninth at the Olympics, throwing 165 ft 5 in (50.42 m). ÷—–143+305*70

=== Championship streak and 1948 Olympics ===
Dreyer won no national titles in 1937 or 1938, finishing second to Folwartshny in the indoor weight throw in both years. He regained the indoor weight throw title in 1939; in 1940 he finished second to Niles Perkins, but won the outdoor 56-pound weight throw for the first time, throwing 35 ft 6 in (10.82 m). He won seven consecutive national titles in the indoor weight throw from 1941 to 1947, a streak that remained unparalleled until Lance Deal won eight times in a row starting in 1989. Dreyer also won the outdoor weight throw in 1945 and the hammer throw in 1943, 1944 and 1945.

Dreyer's indoor weight throw streak ended in the Olympic year of 1948, when he placed third as Bob Bennett won and Sam Felton took second. However, he regained the outdoor title; his throw of 41 ft 2 5/8 in (12.56 m) exceeded Matt McGrath's old world record of 40 ft 5 3/8 in (12.32 m) from 1911, but the implement used was found to have been too light. He also qualified for his second Olympics in the hammer throw, placing third at the national championships (again behind Bennett and Felton) and second at the final Olympic Trials in Evanston, where he threw 173 ft 4 3/4 in (52.85 m) and defeated Felton. At the Olympics in London Dreyer finished ninth, just as he had twelve years before; this time his best throw was 168 ft 6 3/8 in (51.37 m), three feet better than in Berlin.

=== Later career ===
In 1949 Dreyer successfully defended his outdoor weight throw title. He also set his personal hammer best of 183 ft 3 in (55.87 m) and placed second to Felton at the national championships with 175 ft 6 1/2 in (53.50 m). Track & Field News ranked him eighth among the world's hammer throwers that year, the only time he made the top ten as the rankings were first compiled in 1947.

Dreyer reached career-best form with the 56-pound outdoor weight in 1951; at the Metropolitan championships in June he threw 41 ft 7 1/2 in (12.68 m), again breaking the world record and now legitimately, although as the IAAF didn't recognize official weight throw world records it was only ratified as an American record. He also won the national championship, throwing 41 ft 6 3/4 in (12.66 m), a meeting record. In the hammer throw he placed second to Felton, throwing 182 ft 8 1/4 in (55.68 m), his best mark ever at the national championships. He won a final national title with the 56-pound weight in 1952, throwing 40 ft 3 1/8 in (12.27 m). His attempt to qualify for a third Olympic Games was not successful as, although he threw 173 ft 3 1/2 in (52.82 m) at the 1952 Olympic Trials, it was only good enough for sixth place.
