= Koit Annamaa =

Estonian hammer thrower

Personal information
- Nationality: Estonian
- Born: 16 September 1912 Tartu, Kreis Dorpat, Governorate of Livonia, Russian Empire
- Died: 1 November 1970 (aged 58) Tallinn, then part of Estonian SSR, Soviet Union

Sport
- Sport: Athletics
- Event: Hammer throw

Koit Annamaa (16 September 1912 – 1 November 1970) was an Estonian athlete. He competed in the men's hammer throw at the 1936 Summer Olympics.
