= Pedro J. González =

Mexican American activist, singer, songwriter, guitarist and radio personality

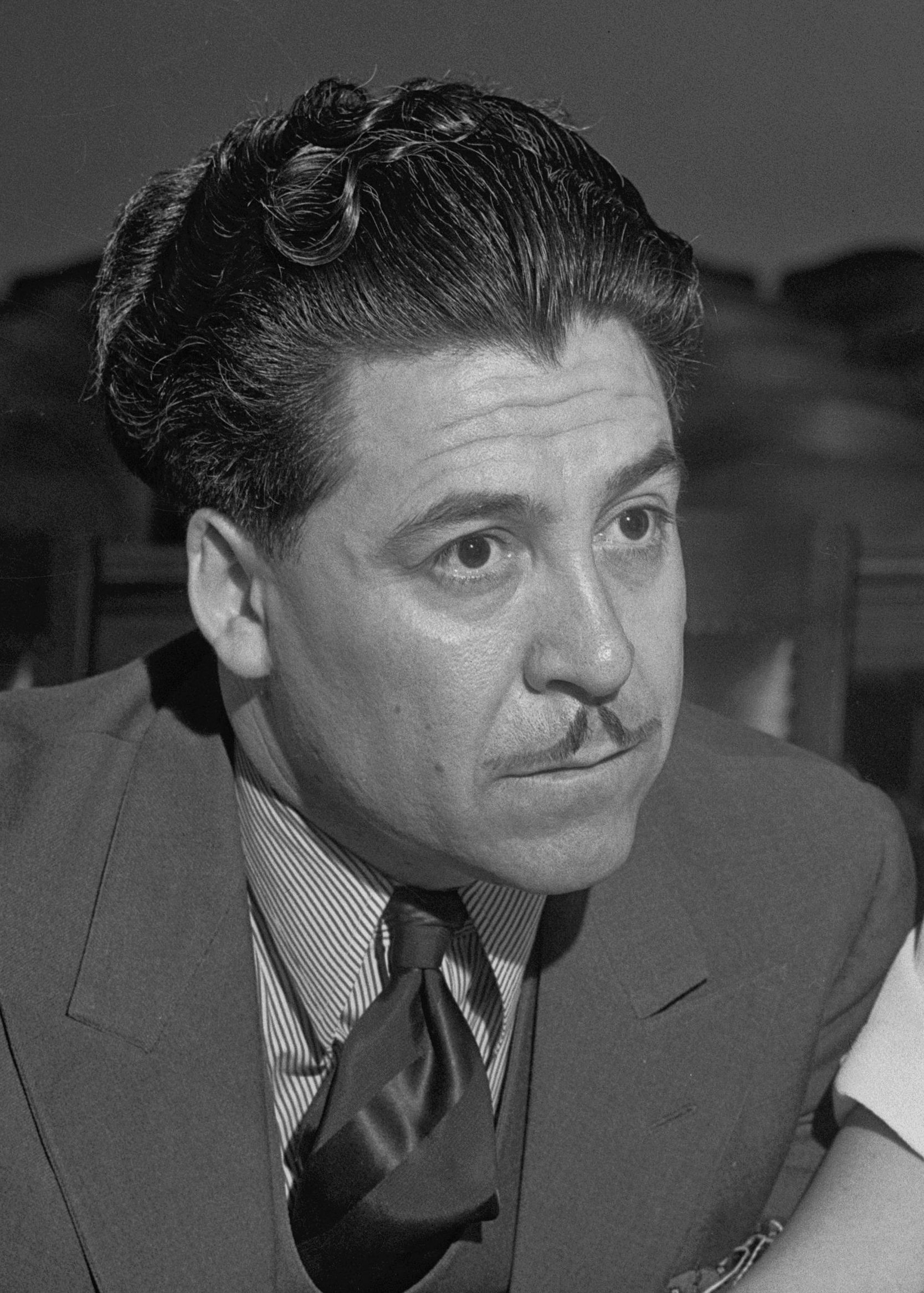
- González in 1935
- Born: Pedro José González Ramos; April 28, 1895; Carrizal, Chihuahua, Mexico
- Died: March 17, 1995 (aged 99); Lodi, California, U.S.
- Occupations: singer; radio host; activist
- Spouse: Maria Salcido (m. 1917)
- Children: 7

Pedro J. González (April 28, 1895 – March 17, 1995) was a Mexican activist, singer, songwriter, guitarist and radio personality. He hosted one of the first Spanish radio broadcasts in California and in the U.S. Through his popular broadcasts, González had strong political influence in the Hispanic community in Los Angeles, which he used to advocate against the mass repatriation of Mexicans and Mexican Americans in the U.S. under Herbert Hoover. González also came to be known for his band, Los Madrugadores, whose songs were played on his radio broadcast.

González would be imprisoned under false charges due to this political influence, his court case politicizing the Mexican and Mexican American community on the issue of discriminatory law-enforcement practices. Despite the attempt to silence him, González was able to achieve prison reform by organizing the first major strike at San Quentin State Prison. After being released from prison on the condition that he be repatriated, he and his wife settled in Tijuana, Mexico where he actively advocated for the land rights of veterans of the Mexican Revolution and started another radio broadcast show. Once he was given access back to the U.S., he moved closer to his family with his wife in California and advocated for Mexican and Mexican American rights in the U.S. until his death at age 99.

== Early life ==
González was born and raised in the small village of Carrizal, Chihuahua, Mexico. His mother was a school teacher who valued education. As a result, González attended school in cities along the border such as Ciudad Juárez, Chihuahua and El Paso, Texas. González aspired to be a telegraph operator, as he was fascinated with the technology. Once González had to leave school since he could not afford to continue, he would, therefore, take up work as a telegraph operator. In fact, starting at age 14 (from 1909 - 1914), González was a telegraph operator for the Ferrocarriles Nacionales de México (Mexican National Railroads).

In 1914, González encountered the División del Norte, which was being led by Pancho Villa at the time. Villa's men arrested González as they were under the assumption that he had shared information about the division with Villa's enemies. Villa gave González two options: work under Villa as a telegraph operator for the División del Norte or be executed; González chose the first option without hesitation. As he traveled with seven other operators, his duties also involved rounding up cattle with Villa's men, which would be used to barter for supplies across the border in the U.S. While he was with the División del Norte, González reportedly composed many corridos with the other soldiers, exhibiting his love for music.

During his time working for Villa, González and some of Villa's men were also captured by the Mexican army in the pro-Villa town of Camargo, Chihuahua, Mexico and were going to be executed. They were saved when school children ran in front of González and the soldiers before they could be executed, a delay organized by a local school teacher. This allowed them to send a telegram to the governor to receive a pardon. Later, he met and danced with one of the children who saved him, María Salcido (who was 14 at the time), who later became his wife.

Following the Battle of Columbus (1916), Villa became unpopular in the U.S. and in Mexico, which led to a manhunt for Villa and consequently, the death of many soldiers who followed Villa. Due to Villa no longer being recognized as the official leader of Mexico, and the chaos that followed that change, González would leave his position in the División del Norte in 1916.

In 1917, after leaving the Northern Division, González moved to Texas and temporarily sorted mail at a train station in El Paso. Later, across the border in Ciudad Juárez, González would take up work as a telegraph operator. In the 1920s, González fled Ciudad Juárez with his wife and his children due to one of the many battles of the Mexican Revolution. In 1921, he would return to work for the Ferrocarriles Nacionales de México. In 1923, he came back to El Paso, Texas, where he worked as a telegraph operator with the Mexico North Western Railway.

== Life in Los Angeles ==
Three years later, he left El Paso and moved with his family to Los Angeles, California where the economy was booming. He found work as a longshoreman on the docks in San Pedro, Los Angeles. While working as a longshoreman, González and the other workers were not allowed to sing as they loaded and unloaded cargo from ships at the docks. However, one day, González began singing unconsciously and although the workers had been warned that they would lose their job if they did so, González was neither reprimanded nor fired. Instead, González earned a reputation as a singer among his fellow workers. González, as a result, tried to audition as a singer for radio station KMPC's popular live radio. However, the station manager denied him simply because he sang in Spanish. Not discouraged, González got involved in radio through ads, opening a once untapped source of local radio.

=== Music, activism, and political influence on radio ===
In the 1920s, many U.S. companies tried to broaden their audience by appealing to the Mexican population by advertising their products in Spanish. After struggling to find a radio station that would accept him, González saw an ad from a music house owned by Mauricio Caulderón in LA, who hired him. González thus became a paid ad-reader for Spanish language ads. After a few months, he became independent and began writing ads for Mexican products. Later, he landed a 4 a.m. to 6 a.m. time slot for his own show on an independent station operated by a man named Don Pedro who identified as Mexican. González quickly became highly recognized within the Spanish-speaking community through the radio station on KMPC, reaching hundreds of thousands of people as far as Texas, especially Mexican laborers.

==== Music and culture ====
His program consisted of Los Madrugadores (The Dawn Risers), who premiered on KMPC in December, 1929. This wake-up radio show was broadcast live from Teatro Hidalgo in Mexican Barrio. It was aimed at the growing Latino/a community, and specifically the Mexican labor community who worked early hours, throughout the Southwest. Los Madrugadores became one of the most prominent groups amongst Mexican artists in LA during the 1930s. In regards to their music, they catered to the musical tastes of the Mexican community in the form of corridos and canción mexicana. González aired live music, including romantic ballads that he sang alongside Los Madrugadores. These included classics such as "Sonora Querida" and “Mañanitas Tapatías” which were recorded and released by the Columbia Records label. Their content was based in the band members' first-hand knowledge of the working class in LA, explaining their popularity in the working class and labor communities. For instance, González started as a longshoreman and the two other founding members of Los Madrugadores, Victor and Jesus Sánchez, had been farm workers. Los Madrugadores soon became a popular entertainment group at gatherings of both Mexicans and white Americans. In fact, they became an attraction at the city's white social and politically elite events. As his radio show and Los Madrugadores gained popularity, González became a cultural icon, essentially helping to preserve Mexican language and culture in the Southwest during a time of extreme hostility towards immigrants in the 1920s and 1930s.

==== Popularity and influence ====
In addition to the music he played for his widespread audience, ranging from across California, to Arizona, to northern Mexico, González also used his platform to talk about a wide range of topics. From broadcasts about injustices towards Mexicans and issues concerning Mexican workers in Southern California, to advertisements of local businesses and publicizing local job listings. In one case in 1929, González organized a collection for donations that would go towards paying for the burial of a Mexican woman, María González. María González had been raped and murdered in Los Angeles, and due to her family being in poverty, her body was to be cremated, as the cost for a proper burial was too expensive. Listeners of González's broadcast were able to raise $152.97 (equivalent to about $2,200 today) to help María González's family with the burial cost.

Another example of his influence within the Mexican and Mexican American labor community is when González told his listeners that workers were needed to help clear land at a given location in LA. To his own surprise, about 200 laborers with shovels and axes showed up in order to help. After receiving calls of complaints from white Americans about the broadcast causing a disturbance in their neighborhoods, the police arrived at the scene. Perceiving this gathering as an uprising, they begin to arrest some of the workers. These arrests were overseen by District Attorney Buron Fitts who further explained to González about other complaints the police had received about the sound of the Spanish-language radio in the morning. This event marked the start of when González began to be seen negatively and as a threat by the LA police and Fitts.

==== Activism against Mexican repatriation and mass incarceration ====
Due to the Great Depression in the 1930s, Mexican immigrants and Mexican Americans were scapegoats for the stagnant economy. Consequently, the 1930s saw thousands of Mexican immigrants incarcerated due to the passage of legislation that criminalized unauthorized entry into the U.S. The Secretary of Labor under President Herbert Hoover, William N. Doak, launched a campaign of repatriation (see Mexican Repatriation) that targeted illegal Mexicans in the U.S. "Sweeps" were conducted, which involved agents of the United States Border Patrol of the Immigration and Naturalization Service surrounding an area, such as a farm or factory and in some cases a Latino neighborhood, public park or public transportation, where many potential Mexican immigrants were suspected to be. The agents would then demand identification, and arrest those who could not provide the necessary papers. Due to the scale and surprise factor of the repatriation sweeps, many legal Mexican Americans were also deported or incarcerated under the charge of being illegal immigrants.

As about half a million Mexican immigrants and Mexican Americans were deported under these repatriation policies, González was one of the few people who extensively reported on the repatriation and warned the Mexican community of the raids. "They say that this government campaign is to secure jobs for North American citizens. It's a trick. It isn't true. It's really nothing more than a racist attack against all Mexicans. We are neither illegals nor undesirables," said González in one of his broadcasts. He was also vocal about his criticism of Buron Fitts' anti-Mexican sentiment. Additionally, he used his corridos to protest these situations.

His popularity and influence over the Mexican and Mexican American community further alarmed government officials. As a result, he was also unjustly incarcerated like many Mexican American people at the time, with his release from prison depending on the very policy of repatriation he had protested.

== Arrest and life in prison ==
By 1933, González started being perceived as a threat to the Anglo establishments in LA. Specifically, the Los Angeles Police Department had begun to notice the impact González's early morning radio show had on the Latino/a community. As a result, Los Angeles authorities attempted to have González's broadcast cancelled several times. District Attorney Buron Fitts was one notable figure that was especially concerned about González's political power as he told the press: "What if this madman, troublesome as he is, and on top that a Villista, a telegraphist for Villa, what if he starts telling all the Mexicans... to rise up with a bottle of gasoline, at a certain hour, and start burning all the Americans' houses. What an incredible conflict could develop just because of this despicable man." Fitts wanted González off the air and asked that his broadcasting license be revoked on the basis that González lied on his application. However, González was able to prove that he was not guilty of that charge or any illegal activities related to his broadcasting or otherwise, and thus no legal action could be taken to satisfy Fitts's request. This led the LA police to try to find ways to have González arrested and imprisoned, after the unsuccessful attempt to take him off the air. The LA police's attempts to have González convicted included accusations of child neglect, kidnapping, and transportation of minors. When brought before a judge, González was able to convince the judge of his innocence, thus the cases related to those charges were dismissed.

However, in 1934, González was accused of statutory rape for supposedly having sex with two under-aged teenagers. Although González denied the accusation, the judge decided to hold González for trial regarding the accusation. The testimony of sixteen year-old Dora Versus during the court proceeding claimed that González had raped her.

González's court case drew large Mexican and Mexican American crowds and received extensive coverage in Spanish language publications like La Opinión, which included several pictures of González entering the court with his family, listening to the jury's decision, and crowds waiting to get inside the courtroom.

With the jury determining his innocence being composed of Anglo-Americans, González was not looked upon favorably and was found guilty and sentenced to 50 years in prison at the San Quentin State Prison. He was offered probation if he pled guilty, which González refused to do.

=== The "Corrido de Pedro J. González" ===
While González was imprisoned, the remaining members of Los Madrugadores composed a corrido about González. The corrido, in two parts, told of González's popularity, his experiences, his romantic life, and more, as seen in the following sample of the lyrics:

Señores oigan la historia que refiere este corrido

Gentlemen hear the history that this corrido refers to

De un cantador muy famoso de muchos muy bien querido

Of a very famous singer, dearly loved by many

Aprendan bien estos versos no los echen en el olvido

Learn these verses well, don't let them be forgotten

Es Pedro J. González de quien vamos a cantar

It's Pedro J. González of who we will sing of

El anunciador de radio que se hizo más popular con sus bonitas canciones

The radio announcer that was made more popular with his pretty songs

Supo a todos conquistar

He knew how to win everyone over

El pueblo con simpatía lo haría sentir un hermano

The town with sympathy made him feel like a brother

Por escuchar sus programas se levantaban temprano a oír a Pedro González con su guitarra en la mano

To listen to his programs they got up early to hear Pedro González with his guitar in his hand

El siguiente día formaron Los Madrugadores

The following day they formed Los Madrugadores

y por miles se contaron todos sus admiradores

And for miles all of his admirers were told

De todas partes venían a oír a sus cantadores

From every part they came to hear his singers

Las mujeres no faltaban a diario a sus oficinas

The women were never missing daily at their offices

Pasando dedicatorias a hermanas, tías y sobrinas

Passing dedications to sisters, aunts, and nieces

La mayor parte a sus novios y otros hasta sus vecinas

The majority to their boyfriends and others even to their neighbors

=== Life in prison and prison reform ===
At San Quentin, prison conditions were cramped with thousands of Mexican immigrants being imprisoned. Other American prison conditions made life difficult for the incarcerated Mexican immigrants. At the time, letters that were written from the prison, and received by the prison had to be in English. While incarcerated, González acted as a translator for fellow Mexican inmates, that only spoke and read Spanish. He also assisted those inmates as a "de facto liaison".

While imprisoned, González was disgusted by the way in which officials punished the inmates. He felt that the forms of punishments used on inmates were similar to those "used 500 years ago." González himself was forced to stand in "a tank filled with excrement and sewage" during one such punishment. After experiencing the horrible treatment inmates were subjected to, González organized a hunger strike. He aimed to not only make punishments less inhumane, he also demanded that he and other Mexican prisoners be given the "right to write and receive letters in Spanish" and have "Mexican cultural events". About 10,000 inmates at San Quentin were involved in this hunger strike, which left officials no choice but to make changes to the system.

== Release and life after prison ==
Soon after his imprisonment, the young woman González was found guilty of raping recanted her testimony, stating that she had been pressured by the Los Angeles Police Department and the district attorney's office to provide that testimony. The judge refused to accept her affidavit and González remained in prison. Meanwhile, defense committees working towards González's release were created in California as well as in southwest and northern Mexico. Additionally, two Mexican Presidents made appeals for his release, supporting the defense committees in California. González, along with other prisoners, contacted the Mexican Consul, requesting to be included in the deportation and repatriation movements of the 1930s, citing that it was better to be deported to Mexico than to stay in prison in the United States. The Mexican Consul in Los Angeles—referencing to González's request for deportation and alluding to González's prominence for Mexicans north of the border—appealed for his release. Throughout this time, protests were being organized by González's wife, Maria, as well as his friends, family, and fans.

As pressure mounted through a combination of these advocacy initiatives, the California State Parole Board agreed to release González in 1940, on the condition that he be deported to Mexico. There are accounts of sizable crowds gathering at the train station to bid farewell to him in Los Angeles. González would later recall the event in an interview: "My wife was there. Everybody went to see me all day long; from seven in the morning. I had guards; I had my guitar; everybody stopped to say hi, crying. Since they knew I was leaving [the U.S.], well, they put up their children to kiss me... There was a moment when they asked me to sing a song. I said 'Sure, why not?' And the guards says 'You can't sing.' [González says] 'So what are you going to do? Throw me in jail again? I just got out of there! Throw me wherever you want, but I'm going to sing'... So I started to sing... and I satisfied them."

=== Life and Activism in Tijuana, Mexico ===
After being deported to Mexico, González and his family settled in Tijuana, Mexico. González was instrumental in developing the radio broadcasting industry in Tijuana, as he had been in California. He also created another group of Los Madrugadores, which would also have their work broadcast by González.

During this time, González was a strong advocate for veterans of the Mexican Revolution. In fact, he led the formation of a national organization, which recognized and fought for the rights of these veterans. This organization was able to get veterans health and pension benefits as well as land grants in the form of ejidos.

=== Return to the U.S. ===
Due to opposition he had faced from politicians and land speculators in Tijuana, González and his wife moved back to California in 1973. This also allowed them to live closer to their children, who were all U.S. citizens. It is unclear when he was granted access back to the US. He continued to support Mexican veterans and the civil rights of Mexicans and Mexican Americans until his death on March 17, 1995, in Lodi, California.

== Legacy and popular culture ==
González's work did not receive much recognition until the release of the documentary, Ballad of an Unsung Hero, which was directed by Isaac Artenstein and produced by Emmy award-winning filmmaker and producer, Paul Espinosa. Aired in 1984, it covered his life and included interviews with an 88 year old González and his 80 year old wife, María, with rare footage.

Artenstein also directed a feature-length documentary film on González's life, Break of Dawn, in 1988. It focuses on his life and achievements in Los Angeles as well as his time and activism in prison. González was played by Mexican actor, Óscar Chávez, and his wife, María, was played by Mexican actress, María Rojo.

His legacy lives as the mayors of Los Angeles and San Diego proclaimed a Pedro J. González Day in 1985.

== Discography ==
- Pedro J. González and Los Madrugadores (Arhoolie CD 7035)
