= Eiichiro Matsuno =

Japanese hammer thrower (born 1914)

Personal information
- Nationality: Japanese
- Born: 5 September 1914

Sport
- Sport: Athletics
- Event: Hammer throw

Eiichiro Matsuno (松野 栄一郎, Matsuno Eiichirō; born 5 September 1914, date of death unknown) was a Japanese track and field athlete. He competed in the men's hammer throw at the 1936 Summer Olympics.
