= Saint-Pé-de-Bigorre station =

Railway station in Saint-Pé-de-Bigorre, France

Coordinates: 43°06′05″N 0°09′42″W

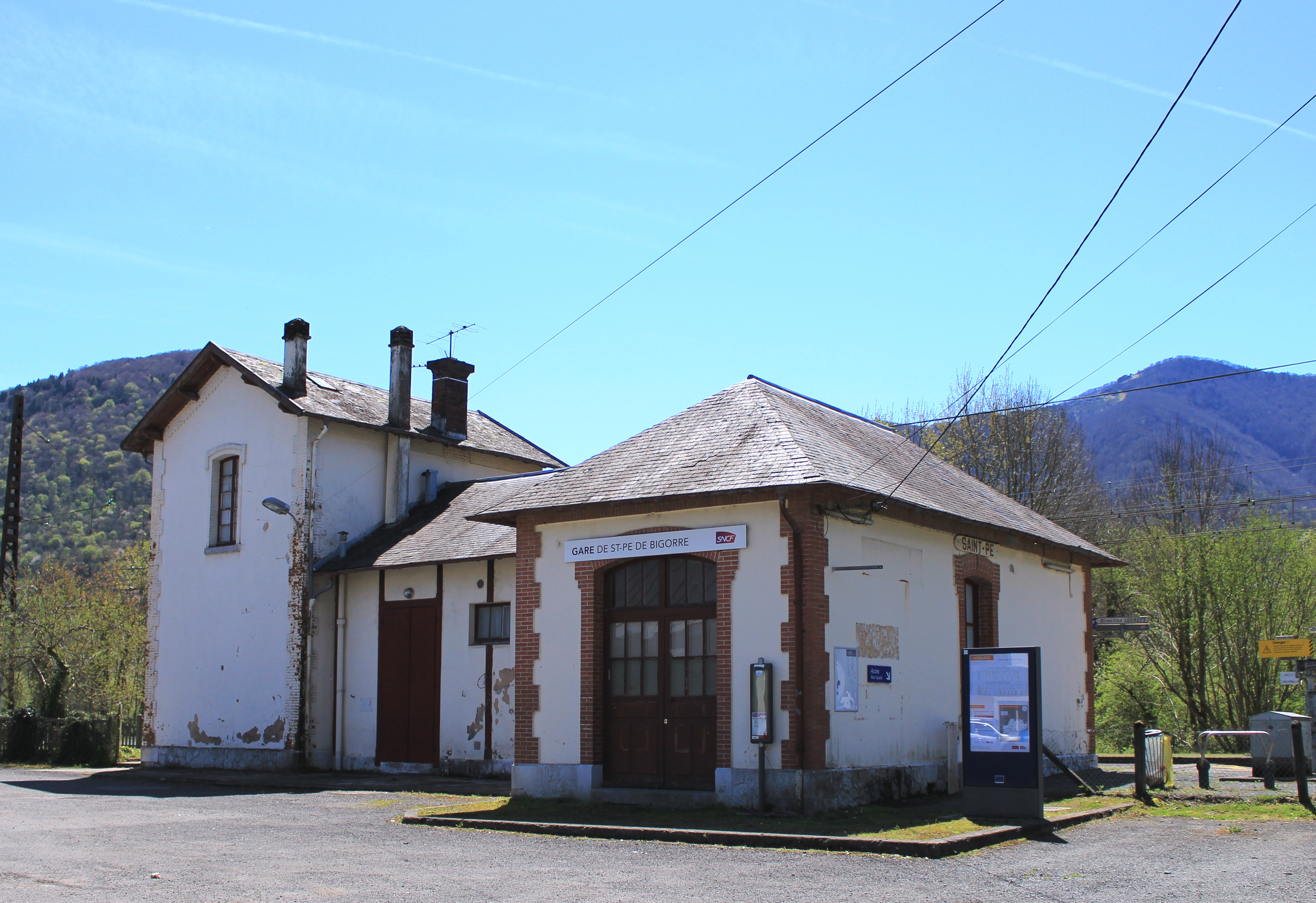
The station in April 2018

Saint-Pé-de-Bigorre is a railway station in Saint-Pé-de-Bigorre, Occitanie, France. The station is on the Toulouse–Bayonne railway line. The station is served by TER (local) services operated by the SNCF.

== Train services ==
The station is served by regional trains towards Bordeaux, Bayonne, Pau and Tarbes.

Preceding station	TER Nouvelle-Aquitaine	Following station
Montaut-Bétharram towards Bordeaux	52	Lourdes towards Tarbes
Montaut-Bétharram towards Bayonne	53	Lourdes towards Tarbes
