= Isao Abe =

Japanese hammer thrower

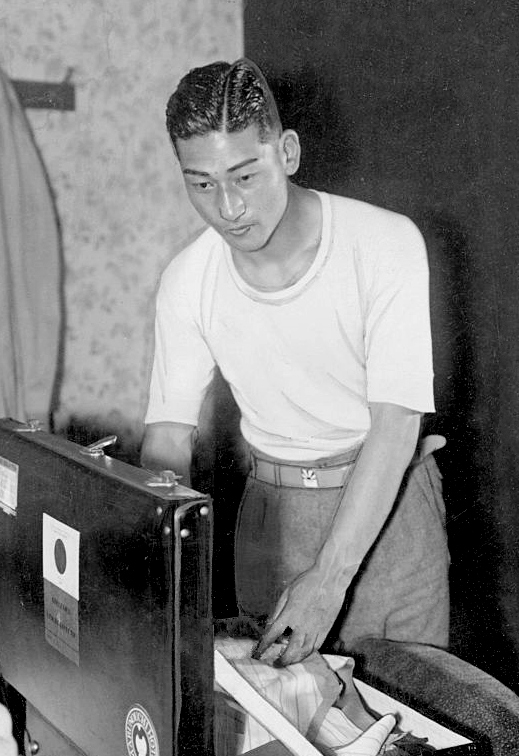
- Isao Abe at the 1936 Olympics

Personal information
- Born: February 18, 1912
- Died: February 15, 1980 (aged 67)
- Education: Chuo University
- Height: 1.77 m (5 ft 10 in)
- Weight: 75 kg (165 lb)

Sport
- Sport: Hammer throw

Isao Ko Abe (阿部 功, February 18, 1912 – February 15, 1980) was a Japanese hammer thrower. He competed at the 1936 Summer Olympics and finished in 13th place.

After his athletic retirement, he joined the Ministry of Railways.
