= Don Cook (journalist) =

American journalist

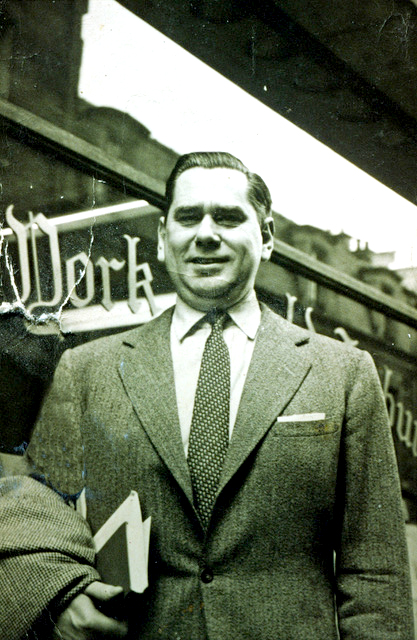
- Born: August 8, 1920; Bridgeport, Connecticut, U.S.
- Died: March 7, 1995 (aged 74); Philadelphia, Pennsylvania, U.S.
- Occupation: Journalist

Don Cook (August 8, 1920 — March 7, 1995) was one of the longest-serving, full-time, Paris-based American foreign correspondents of the twentieth century. He worked for the New York Herald Tribune (1943–1964) and the Los Angeles Times (1964–1989) consecutively for 46 years. His career spanned the close of World War II in Europe and the creation of today's Germany, the creation of the North Atlantic Treaty Organization, the crises in Berlin, and the Ronald Reagan-Mikhail S. Gorbachev summits. Cook also wrote several books on history, current affairs and biography. Cook also contributed articles on diplomacy, foreign policy and nuclear disarmament for American and British magazines, among them Atlantic and Foreign Affairs.

== Early life ==
Cook was born August 8, 1920, in Bridgeport, Connecticut, and grew up in Philadelphia, Pennsylvania.

== Early career ==
His career began at St. Petersburg Times in Florida where he was a copy boy. He was then hired by TransRadio Press Service in Philadelphia and subsequently moved to its national office Washington, D.C. In 1943, the New York Herald Tribune hired him to cover the treasury and the White House and then sent him to London.

== Diplomatic correspondent ==
In 1965, he joined the Los Angeles Times in Paris as Bureau Chief and remained there for the next 23 years. In the 1970s, Cook moved into the role of European diplomatic correspondent covering the complex Soviet-US nuclear disarmament talks, and the creation of the European Union and the single currency. When the Iranian revolution broke out in 1979, Cook followed Ayatollah Khomeini from his exile in Paris to Tehran. He covered the early days of the fighting and the fall of the Shah until his colleague, Los Angeles Times Middle East correspondent Joe Alex Morris Jr., who had been on vacation, could get there. Hours after Cook left for Rome, Morris was killed by a sniper's bullet.

== Later years ==
Cook retired in 1989 after 45 years abroad, and moved back to his hometown, Philadelphia, where he died at home in 1995. He was a member of the Century Club in New York City, and the Garrick and Lansdowne Clubs in London. Cook was married to Cherry Mitchell Cook, who died in 1983. They had seven children: Christopher Cook, Jennifer Thompson, Adrienne Garreau, Deborah Prosser, Caron Merrill, Danielle Cook, and Dominique Cook.

== Publications ==
- Fighting Americans of today
- Tough Little Army: A Correspondent's Dispatch on the Surprising Strength of Israel
- Floodtide In Europe (1963) GP Putnam
- The Warlords: Eisenhower. With Lord Michael Carver (1976) Little Brown
- Ten Men and History (1981) Doubleday
- Charles De Gaulle, A Biography (1985) GP Putnam
- Forging The Alliance (1989) Secker & Warburg
- The Long Fuse, How England Lost The American Colonies. (1996) Grove/Atlantic
