= Joseph Wirtz =

French hammer thrower

Personal information
- Nationality: French
- Born: 5 January 1912 Teterchen, France
- Died: 12 September 1991 (aged 79) Boulay-Moselle, France

Sport
- Sport: Athletics
- Event: Hammer throw

Joseph Wirtz (5 January 1912 – 12 September 1991) was a French athlete. He competed in the men's hammer throw at the 1936 Summer Olympics.
