= Geoff Frood =

Australian rules footballer, born 1906

Personal information
- Full name: Geoff Frood
- Born: 13 March 1906
- Died: 8 March 1995 (aged 88)
- Original team: Old Caulfield Grammarians

Playing career^{1}
Years	Club	Games (Goals)
1930	Melbourne	1 (2)
- ^{1} Playing statistics correct to the end of 1930.

Geoff Frood (13 March 1906 – 8 March 1995) was an Australian rules footballer who played with Melbourne in the Victorian Football League (VFL).
