= Athletics at the 1924 Summer Olympics – Men's hammer throw =

Olympic athletics event

Men's hammer throw at the Games of the VIII Olympiad
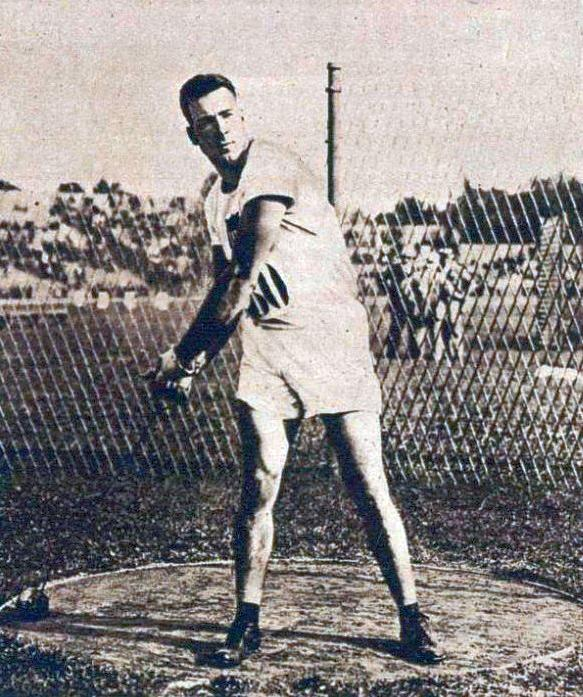
- Fred Tootell competing
- Venue: Stade Olympique Yves-du-Manoir
- Date: July 10, 1924
- Competitors: 15 from 10 nations
- Winning distance: 53.295

Medalists
1st place, gold medalist(s)		Fred Tootell; United States
2nd place, silver medalist(s)		Matt McGrath; United States
3rd place, bronze medalist(s)		Malcolm Nokes; Great Britain

The men's hammer throw event was part of the track and field athletics programme at the 1924 Summer Olympics. The competition was held on Thursday, July 10, 1924. 15 hammer throwers from ten nations competed. The maximum number of athletes per nation was 4. The event was won by Fred Tootell of the United States, the nation's sixth consecutive victory in the event; the Americans would not win again until 1956. Tootell was the first of the winners to have been born in the United States; the previous winners had all been Irish-American. Fellow American Matt McGrath, the 1908 silver medalist and 1912 champion, took silver once again; he was the second man (after triple gold medalist John Flanagan) to earn three medals in the hammer throw. Malcolm Nokes earned Great Britain's first medal in the event with his bronze.

== Background ==
This was the sixth appearance of the event, which has been held at every Summer Olympics except 1896. Two of the finalists from the 1920 Games returned: silver medalist (and 1912 finalist) Carl Johan Lind of Sweden and fifth-place finisher Matt McGrath of the United States. McGrath had finished second in 1908 and won in 1912; he had injured himself in the 1920 competition and finished fifth despite not getting to make all of his allotted throws. He had been a top thrower since 1907, overlapping John Flanagan at the end of Flanagan's prime for a titanic battle in the 1908 Games, before spending two decades sharing top honors with Patrick Ryan. Ryan had retired earlier in 1924, leaving the young (21 years old to McGrath's 47) Fred Tootell as the primary challenger to McGrath.

Brazil, France, Italy, and the Netherlands each made their debut in the event. The United States appeared for the sixth time, the only nation to have competed at each appearance of the event to that point.

== Competition format ==
The competition continued to use the divided-final format used since 1908, with results carrying over between "rounds". Each athlete received three throws in the qualifying round. The top six men advanced to the final, where they received an additional three throws. The best result, qualifying or final, counted.

== Records ==
These were the standing world and Olympic records (in metres) prior to the 1924 Summer Olympics.

World record	Patrick Ryan (USA)	57.77	New York City, United States	17 August 1913
Olympic record	Matt McGrath (USA)	54.74	Stockholm, Sweden	14 July 1912

No new world or Olympic records were set during the competition.

== Schedule ==
Date	Time	Round
Thursday, 10 July 1924	14:00	Qualifying; Final

== Results ==
The best six throwers qualified for the final. The throwing order and the throwing series are not available.

Rank	Athlete	Nation	Qualifying	Final	Distance
1st place, gold medalist(s)	Fred Tootell	United States	50.600	53.295	53.295
2nd place, silver medalist(s)	Matt McGrath	United States	47.075	50.840	50.840
3rd place, bronze medalist(s)	Malcolm Nokes	Great Britain	48.875	Unknown	48.875
4	Erik Eriksson	Finland	47.975	48.740	48.740
5	Ossian Skiöld	Sweden	45.075	45.285	45.285
6	James McEachern	United States	44.935	45.225	45.225
7	Carl Johan Lind	Sweden	44.785	Did not advance	44.785
8	John Murdoch	Canada	42.480	Did not advance	42.480
9	Jack Merchant	United States	41.455	Did not advance	41.455
10	Robert Saint-Pé	France	36.270	Did not advance	36.270
11	Karl Jensen	Denmark	36.265	Did not advance	36.265
12	Pierre Zaïdin	France	36.155	Did not advance	36.155
13	Camilio Zemi	Italy	35.000	Did not advance	35.000
14	Octávio Zani	Brazil	33.895	Did not advance	33.895
—	Henk Kamerbeek	Netherlands	NM	Did not advance	NM

== Sources ==
- Official Report
- Wudarski, Pawel (1999). "Wyniki Igrzysk Olimpijskich" (in Polish).
