= Saint-Pé-de-Bigorre =

- Commune
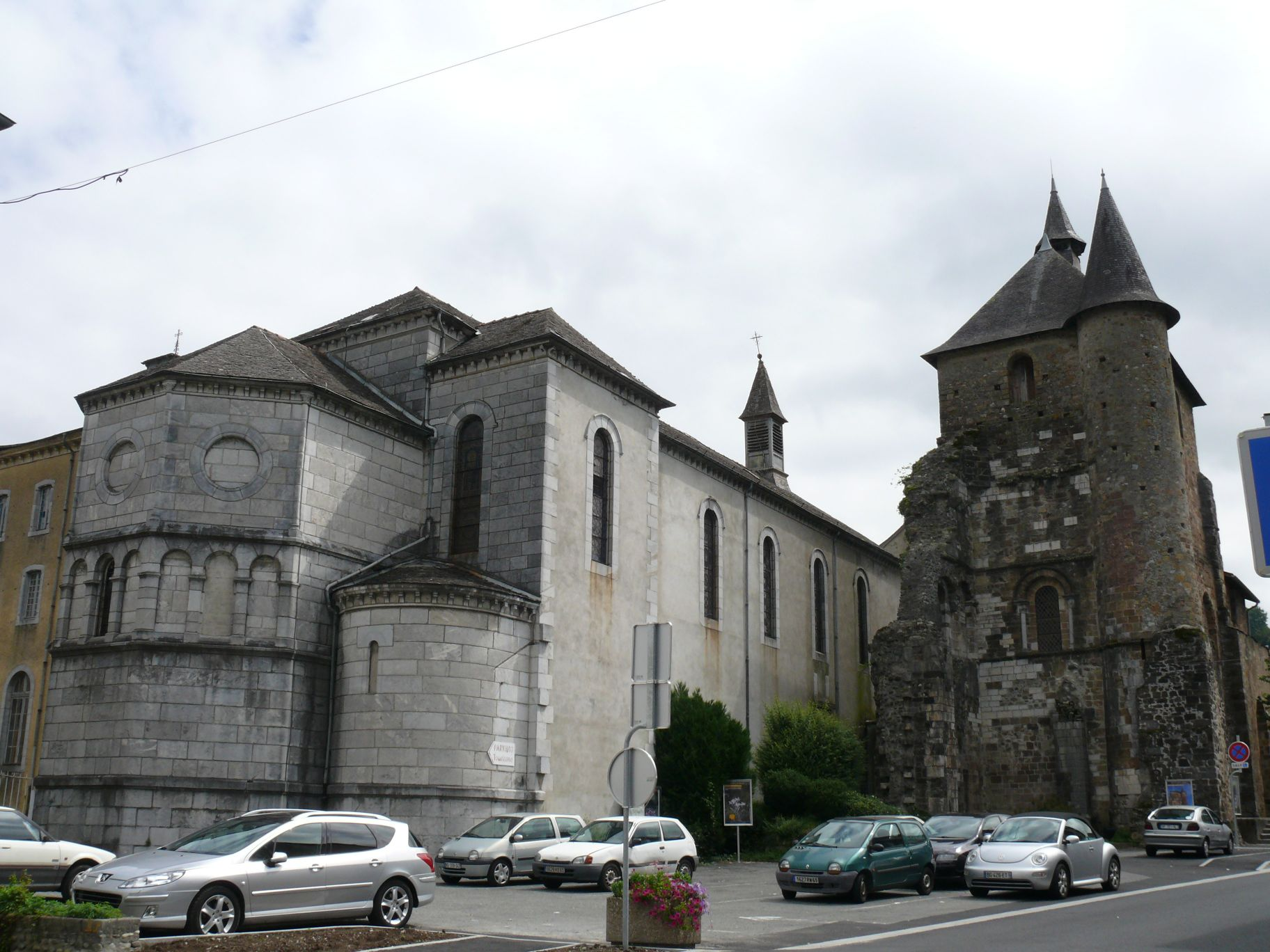
- The church of Saint-Pierre

- Coat of arms
- Location of Saint-Pé-de-Bigorre
- Location within France Location within Occitanie
- Coordinates: 43°06′10″N 0°09′29″W
- Country: France
- Region: Occitania
- Department: Hautes-Pyrénées
- Arrondissement: Argelès-Gazost
- Canton: Lourdes-1
- Intercommunality: CA Tarbes-Lourdes-Pyrénées

Government
  - Mayor (2020–2026): Jean-Claude Beaucoueste
- Area^{1}: 43.44 km^{2} (16.77 sq mi)
- Elevation: 333 m (1,093 ft)
- Highest elevation: 1,527 m (5,010 ft)
- Lowest elevation: 308 m (1,010 ft)
- Population (2023): 1,144
  - Density: 26.34/km^{2} (68.21/sq mi)
- Time zone: UTC+01:00 (CET)
  - Summer (DST): UTC+02:00 (CEST)
- INSEE/Postal code: 65395 /65270
- ^{1} French Land Register data, which excludes lakes, ponds, glaciers > 1 km^{2} (0.386 sq mi or 247 acres) and river estuaries.

Saint-Pé-de-Bigorre (before 1962: Saint-Pé) is a commune in the Hautes-Pyrénées department in south-western France. Saint-Pé-de-Bigorre station has rail connections to Bayonne, Bordeaux, Tarbes and Pau.

== See also ==
- Communes of the Hautes-Pyrénées department
