= Sulo Heino =

Finnish hammer thrower

Personal information
- Nationality: Finnish
- Born: 14 December 1908 Tuusula, Grand Duchy of Finland
- Died: 24 April 1996 (aged 87) Helsinki, Finland

Sport
- Sport: Athletics
- Event: Hammer throw

Sulo Heino (14 December 1908 – 24 April 1996) was a Finnish athlete. He competed in the men's hammer throw at the 1936 Summer Olympics.
