= Giovanni Cantagalli =

Italian hammer thrower (1914–2008)

Personal information
- Nationality: Italian
- Born: 11 January 1914 Mantua
- Died: 2 September 2008 (aged 94) Panama

Sport
- Country: Italy
- Sport: Athletics
- Event: Hammer throw
- Club: ASSI Giglio Rosso

Achievements and titles
- Personal best: Hammer throw: 48.76 (1936).

Giovanni Cantagalli (11 January 1914 – 2 September 2008) was an Italian hammer thrower who competed at the 1936 Summer Olympics.

== Biography ==
After World War II he emigrated with his wife to Panama where he worked as a neuropsychiatrist. He died in 2008, aged 94.

== National titles ==
- Italian Athletics Championships
  - Hammer throw: 1935, 1936, 1937, 1938
