= Sam Thomson (sportsman, born 1911) =

Scottish footballer

Personal information
- Full name: Samuel Johnstone Thomson
- Date of birth: 27 May 1911
- Place of birth: Johnstone, Renfrewshire, Scotland
- Date of death: 23 March 1995 (aged 83)
- Place of death: Paisley, Renfrewshire, Scotland
- Position: Centre half

Senior career*
Years	Team	Apps	(Gls)
1935–1942	Queen's Park	24	(0)

International career
1937	Scotland Amateurs	1	(0)
- Cricket career
Cricket information
- Batting: Right-handed
- Bowling: Leg break googly
Domestic team information
- Years: Team
- 1938–1951: Scotland
Career statistics
Competition	First-class
Matches	4
Runs scored	75
Batting average	15.00
100s/50s	–/–
Top score	21*
Balls bowled	453
Wickets	17
Bowling average	14.47
5 wickets in innings	1
10 wickets in match	–
Best bowling	5/54
Catches/stumpings	3/–
- Source: Sam Thomson at Cricinfo
- * Club domestic league appearances and goals

Samuel Johnstone Thomson (27 May 1911 – 23 March 1995) was a Scottish amateur sportsman who played football and cricket.

== Sporting career ==
=== Football ===
Thomson played as a centre half in the Scottish League for Queen's Park from 1935 to 1942 and was capped by Scotland at amateur level.

=== Cricket ===
Thomson was a club cricketer for Ferguslie Cricket Club. He made his debut for Scotland in first-class cricket against Ireland at Glasgow in July 1938, with him making a further appearance the following month against Yorkshire at Harrogate as part of Scotland's tour of England. Following the Second World War, he resumed playing first-class cricket for Scotland, making two further appearances. The first came in 1946 against Ireland, while the second came in 1951 against Warwickshire on Scotland's tour of England. In four first-class matches, Thomson scored 75 runs with a highest score of 21 not out. It was as a leg break googly bowler that Thomson had an impact, taking 17 wickets at an average of 14.47; he took one five wicket haul, with figures of 5 for 54 on debut against Ireland.

== Personal life ==
Thomson was born at Johnstone in May 1911. He was educated at Camphill Secondary School, before matriculating to the University of Glasgow. After graduating, he became a schoolteacher. During the Second World War, he was an emergency commission in the Royal Air Force Volunteer Reserve as a pilot officer on probation in March 1943. In September of the same year, he was promoted to flight officer on probation. Thomson died at Paisley in March 1995.
