= Hughie Price =

Australian rules footballer, born 1908

Personal information
- Full name: Hughes Davies Price
- Born: 29 July 1908; Pyramid Hill, Victoria
- Died: 14 March 1995 (aged 86); Myrtleford, Victoria

Playing career^{1}
Years	Club	Games (Goals)
1929	North Melbourne	3 (1)
1931	St Kilda	1 (0)
Total		4 (1)
- ^{1} Playing statistics correct to the end of 1931.

Hughes Davies Price (29 July 1908 – 14 March 1995) was an Australian rules footballer who played with North Melbourne and St Kilda in the Victorian Football League (VFL).

Price later served in the Royal Australian Navy during World War II.
