= Robert Saint-Pé =

French hammer thrower

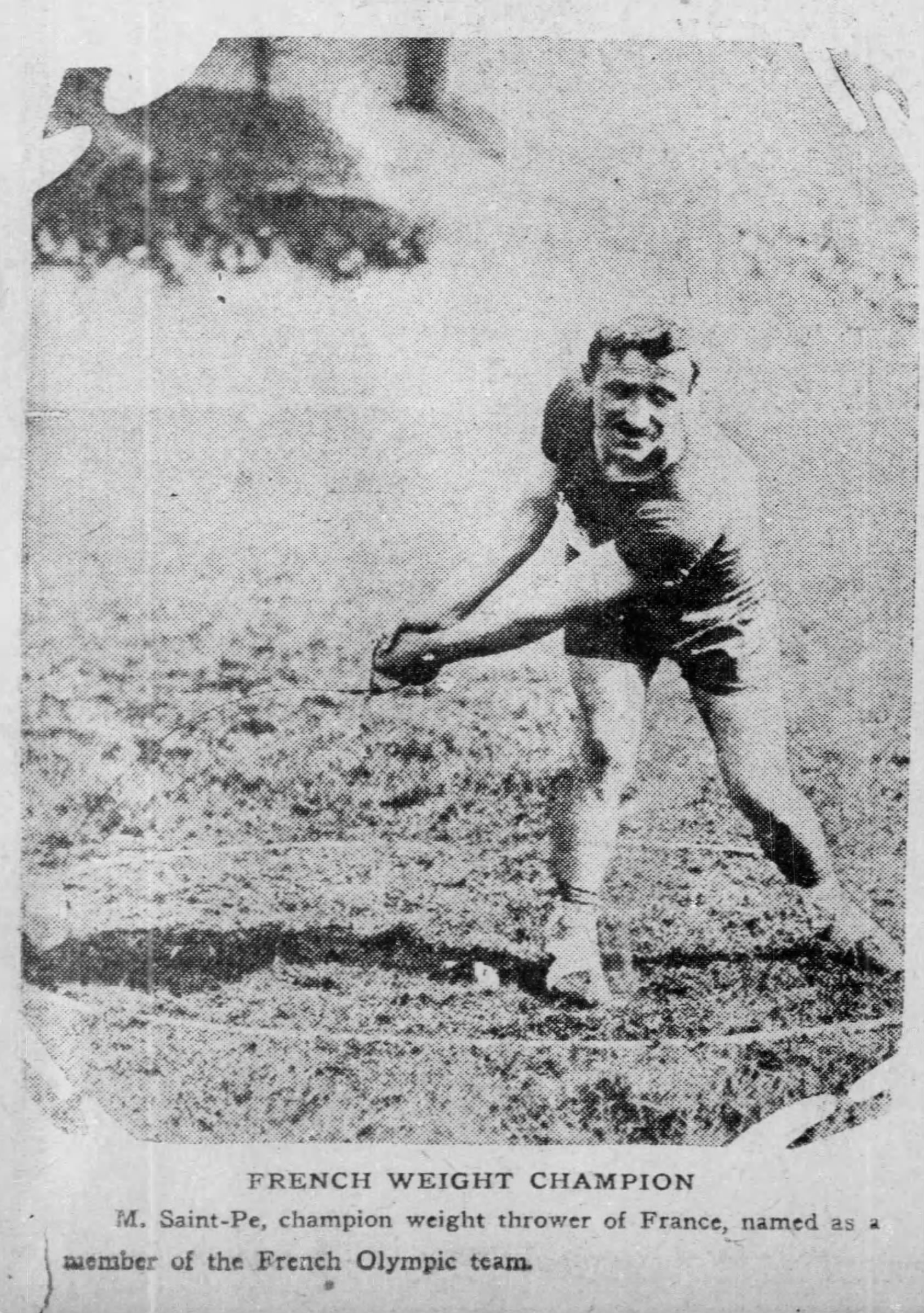
- Saint-Pé in 1924.

Personal information
- Nationality: French
- Born: 16 July 1899 Bordeaux, France
- Died: 13 June 1988 (aged 88) Mont-de-Marsan, France

Sport
- Sport: Athletics
- Event: Hammer throw

Robert Saint-Pé (16 July 1899 – 13 June 1988) was a French athlete. He competed in the men's hammer throw at the 1924 Summer Olympics.
