= Canción sentimental mexicana =

The canción sentimental mexicana is a Mexican stylized song, commonly accompanied by guitar or piano. The lyrics of songs are typically of a poetic and romantic nature, in free prose. Popular composers were Manuel Ponce and Tata Nacho.
