= Bernhard Greulich =

German hammer thrower

Personal information
- Nationality: German
- Born: 4 December 1902 Mannheim, German Empire
- Died: 4 March 1995 (aged 92) Mannheim, West Germany

Sport
- Sport: Athletics
- Event: Hammer throw

Bernhard Greulich (4 December 1902 – 4 March 1995) was a German athlete. He competed in the men's hammer throw at the 1936 Summer Olympics in Berlin and finished seventh. He has also won five national titles in weight throw, hammer throw and power triathlon, which consists of, hammer throw, weight throw, and stone put. He was also an avid gymnast and field hockey player, living in Mannheim.
