= Karl Hein (athlete) =

German hammer thrower

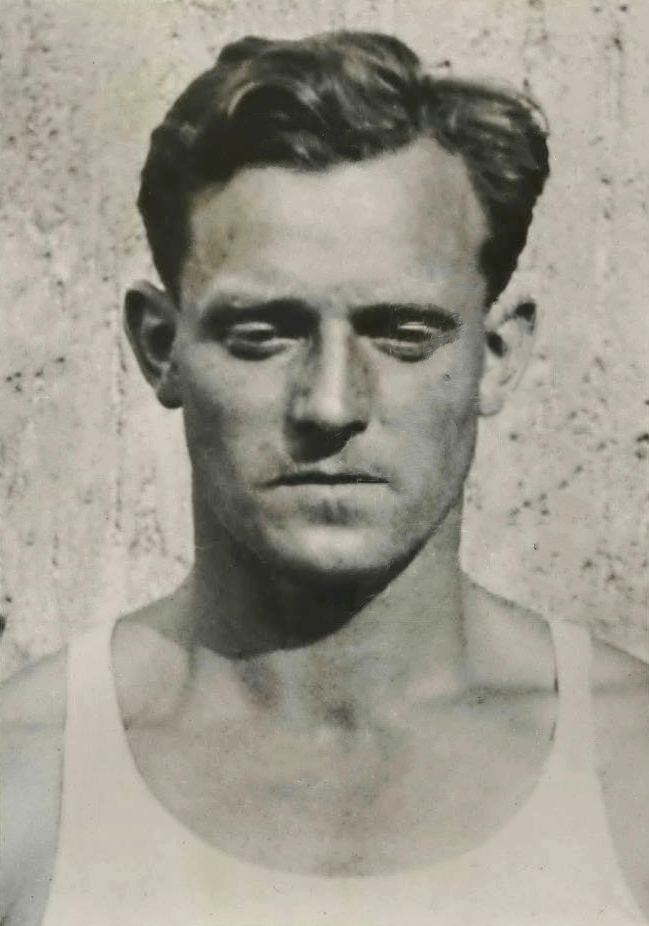
- Hein in 1936

Personal information
- Born: 11 June 1908 Hamburg, German Empire
- Died: 10 July 1982 (aged 74) Hamburg, West Germany
- Height: 179 cm (5 ft 10 in)
- Weight: 103 kg (227 lb)

Sport
- Sport: Athletics
- Event: Hammer throw
- Club: SV St. Georg, Hamburg

Achievements and titles
- Personal best: 58.77 (1938)
Medal record
Men's athletics
Representing Germany
Olympic Games
Gold medal – first place	1936 Berlin	Hammer throw
European Championships
Gold medal – first place	1938 Paris	Hammer throw

Karl Hein (11 June 1908 – 10 July 1982) was a German hammer thrower who won a gold medal at the 1936 Summer Olympics.

== Biography ==
By the early 1930s Hein had married and retired from athletics. He resumed competing after watching a film about the 1932 Olympics, winning the national championships in 1936–38.

At the 1936 Olympic Games in Berlin, Hein won the gold medal in the men's hammer throw competition.

Hein won the British AAA Championships title in the hammer throw event at the 1937 AAA Championships and in 1938 he set two world records and won the European title.

He won the German national championships in 1946–47 and placed second in 1956. In 1962 he was awarded the Rudolf-Harbig-Gedächtnispreis.

Hein died from a stroke aged 74. His son Karl-Peter also competed in the hammer throw, at national level.
