= IC4A =

Annual track and field competition

IC4A Championships (Intercollegiate Association of Amateur Athletes of America) is an annual men's competition held at different colleges every year. Association was established in 1875, the competition (started in 1876) served as the top level collegiate track and field meeting in the United States, prior to the establishment the National Collegiate Athletic Association's championships in 1921. The IC4A one of the oldest annual track meets in the United States. Currently, the Eastern College Athletic Conference serves as the administrative unit controlling the IC4A brand.

The IC4A or ICAAAA body (Intercollegiate Association of Amateur Athletes of America) body controls the track and field contests between the colleges known as the "IC4A." Colleges and universities eligible to compete at the IC4A Championships are those in the New England and Mid-Atlantic States, north and inclusive of Maryland and Delaware. Additionally, teams whose schedules include predominantly teams from that region are also eligible, make the de facto limits of the region reach as far south as North Carolina and as far west as West Virginia. The sobriquet "IC4A" only applies to NCAA Division I competition; men's cross country and track competitions hosted by the ECAC for Division II or III are referred to as ECAC meets. The IC4A and its women's counterpart, the ECAC Division I Championships, are so-called "super-conference" meets, in that schools belong to other conferences as their primary championship conference, like the Atlantic 10, Big East, Ivy League or Northeast Conference.

The IC4A cross country championships had their 104th running in the fall of 2012 and is always held at Van Cortlandt Park in Bronx, New York. Following the success of the outdoor meeting, an indoor championships was created in 1921. In both indoor and outdoor track, the top eight finishers in each event or relay earn the honorary designation of "All-East," while in cross country the designation is extended to the top-25 finishers.

== Events ==
1876 the outdoor events included 100 yard, 440 yard, 880 yard, mile, 120 yard hurdles, HJ, LJ, SP, and Walk. These events have evolved over the years.

=== Indoor ===
1. 60m Dash
2. 200m Dash
3. 400m Dash
4. 500m Run
5. 800m Run
6. 1,000m Run
7. Mile Run
8. 3,000m Run
9. 5,000m Run
10. 55m Hurdles
11. 4 × 400 m Relay
12. 4 × 800 m Relay
13. Distance Medley Relay
14. High Jump
15. Pole Vault
16. Long Jump
17. Triple Jump
18. Shot Put
19. 35-lbs Weight Throw
20. Heptathlon

=== Outdoor ===
1. 100m Dash
2. 200m Dash
3. 400m Dash
4. 800m Run
5. 1,500m Run
6. 3,000m Steeplechase
7. 5,000m Run
8. 10,000m Run
9. 110m Hurdles
10. 400m Hurdles
11. 4 × 100 m Relay
12. 4 × 400 m Relay
13. 4 × 800 m Relay
14. High Jump
15. Pole Vault
16. Long Jump
17. Triple Jump
18. Shot Put
19. Discus
20. Hammer Throw
21. Javelin
22. Decathlon

== Resources ==
- Eastern College Athletic Conference
- Outdoor IC4A Champions from 1876 to 1942 at GBR Athletics
- IC4A/ECAC History - 1876-Present
