= Fred Tootell =

American hammer thrower (1902–1964)

Medal record

Representing the United States

Olympic Games
Gold medal – first place	1924 Paris	Hammer throw

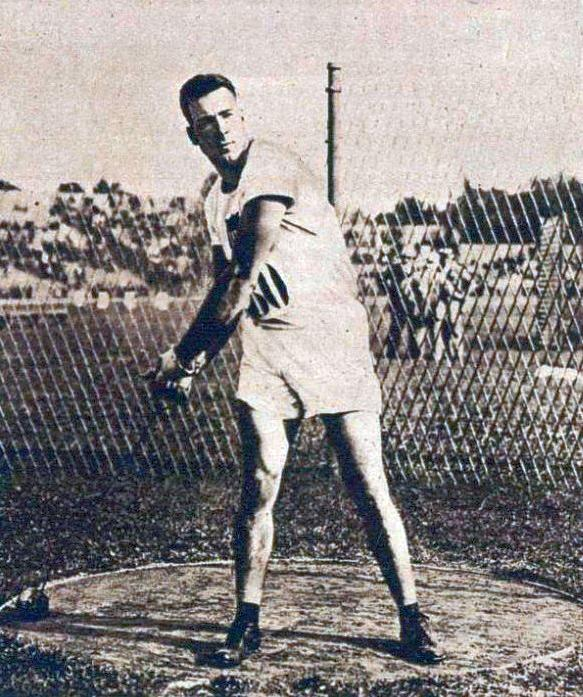
Fred Tootell, la champion olympique du lancer du marteau, en 1924.

Frederick Delmont Tootell (September 9, 1902 – September 29, 1964) was an American athlete who competed mainly in the hammer throw. He competed for the United States in the 1924 Summer Olympics held in Paris in the hammer throw where he won the gold medal. While participating the Olympics, Tootell was affiliated with the Boston Athletic Association.

Tootell was born in Lawrence, Massachusetts and died in Wakefield, Rhode Island. Tootell graduated from Bowdoin College in 1923, where he played American football as a tackle and competed as a hammer thrower, and enrolled at Tufts University School of Medicine to maintain his eligibility for the 1924 Olympics. After Irish-born athletes had won the gold in the hammer throw for the United States for five straight Olympics, Tootell became the first American-born athlete to do so.

Beginning in 1925, he began a 39-year-long affiliation with the University of Rhode Island. He was professor of physical education, and coached the tennis, track, and cross country teams. Between 1953 and 1962, Tootell served as the university's athletic director. The school's Tootell Physical Education Center was named for him, and his home, the Tootell House, in Kingston, Rhode Island is on the National Register of Historic Places. Tootell was posthumously elected to the Rhode Island Heritage Hall of Fame in 1968.

He married Anne Parsons in 1926. After they divorced in 1935, Tootell married Lucy Rawlings Tootell.
