= Deaths in October 1995 =

The following is a list of notable deaths in October 1995.

Entries for each day are listed alphabetically by surname. A typical entry lists information in the following sequence:

- Name, age, country of citizenship at birth, subsequent country of citizenship (if applicable), reason for notability, cause of death (if known), and reference.

== October 1995 ==
=== 1 ===
- Aditya Vikram Birla, 51, Indian industrialist, prostate cancer.
- Einer Boberg, 59–60, Danish-Canadian speech pathologist.
- René Cloke, 90, British illustrator and watercolorist.
- Margaret Gorman, 90, American beauty queen and 1st Miss America.
- Marcel Noual, 83, French Olympic swimmer (1932).
- Felipe Rivera, 24, Chilean tennis player, traffic collision.
- Henry P. Smith III, 84, American politician, member of the United States House of Representatives (1965–1975).
- Ady Stefanetti, 52, Luxembourgian Olympic gymnast (1964).

=== 2 ===
- John Ayers, 42, American National Football League offensive lineman (San Francisco 49ers, Denver Broncos), liver cancer.
- Otto Chr. Bastiansen, 77, Norwegian chemist.
- Hajir Darioush, 57, Iranian film maker.
- Helmut Degen, 84, German composer.
- Elizabeth Jane Lloyd, 67, British artist and teacher.
- Ben Meier, 77, American politician.

=== 3 ===
- Col Austen, 74, Australian rules footballer.
- Orlando Aloysius Battista, 78, Canadian chemist and writer.
- John Chickerneo, 78, American football player (New York Giants).
- Kevin Commins, 67, South African cricketer.
- Plinio Corrêa de Oliveira, 86, Brazilian intellectual and activist.
- George Hoskins, 78, Australian rules footballer.
- Štefan Jačiansky, 65, Slovak football manager.
- Nippy Jones, 70, American baseball player (St. Louis Cardinals, Philadelphia Phillies, Milwaukee Braves).
- Elena Quiroga, 73, Spanish writer.
- Francis O. Schmitt, 91, American biologist and professor.
- M. P. Sivagnanam, 89, Indian freedom fighter and politician.
- Gene Smith, 83, American baseball player.
- Leon Surmelian, 89, Armenian-American author.
- Charles L. Veach, 51, American astronaut (STS-39, STS-52), cancer.

=== 4 ===
- Fabio Albarelli, 52, Italian competitive sailor and Olympic medalist (1968, 1976).
- Matt Armstrong, 83, Scottish footballer.
- Woody Bledsoe, 73, American mathematician, computer scientist, and educator, amyotrophic lateral sclerosis.
- Else Brems, 87, Danish contralto.
- Arturo García Buhr, 89, Argentine actor and film director, suicide.
- Dean Roden Chapman, 73, American mechanical engineer with NASA.
- Fred Fehl, 89, American photographer.
- John L. Greene, 82, American screenwriter (My Favorite Martian).
- Masood Rana, 57, Pakistani film playback singer.
- Eu Chooi Yip, 76, Malaysian politician and Singaporean activist.

=== 5 ===
- Walter Edwin Arnoldi, 77, American aeronautical engineer.
- Karl Johan Baadsvik, 85, Norwegian-Canadian Olympic skier (1936).
- Arthur Barbosa, 87, English artist.
- Lillian Fuchs, 93, American viola player, composer and teacher.
- Linda Gary, 50, American voice actress (He-Man and the Masters of the Universe, She-Ra and the Princesses of Power, Spider-Man).
- Dick Jurgens, 85, American bandleader.
- Pin Malakul, 91, Thai educator and politician.
- Abdurehim Ötkür, 72, Uyghur author and poet.

=== 6 ===
- Michael Allen, 62, English cricketer.
- Paul Baize, 94, French pediatrician and amateur astronomer.
- Karl Band, 94, German architect.
- Eileen Cassidy, 63, Irish Fianna Fáil politician.
- Benoît Chamoux, 34, French Alpinist, disappeared during climb.
- Hughie Charles, 88, English songwriter and impresario.
- José Antonio de Armas Chitty, 86, Venezuelan historian, poet, biographer and researcher.
- Peter Kirkpatrick, 79, British rower and Olympian (1948).
- Iván Mándy, 76, Hungarian writer.
- Anthony Newlands, 70, British actor.

=== 7 ===
- Ya'akov Arnon, 82, Israeli economist and government official.
- Mikhail Butkevich, 69, Soviet/Russian theatre director and drama professor at the Russian Academy of Theatre Arts.
- Roberto Cabrera, 81, Chilean footballer.
- Ralph Churchfield, 77, American basketball player.
- Gérard de Vaucouleurs, 77, French astronomer.
- Emanuele Del Vecchio, 61, Brazilian football forward.
- Gabriele Kröcher-Tiedemann, 44, German far-left militant, cancer.
- Louis Meyer, 91, American Hall of Fame race car driver.
- Olga Taussky-Todd, 89, Austrian and later Czech-American mathematician.
- Harley A. Wilhelm, 95, American chemist.

=== 8 ===
- Erich Brost, 91, German journalist and publisher.
- John Cairncross, 82, Scottish civil servant and Soviet spy during World War II.
- Alvaro Cartei, 84, Italian painter and ceramist.
- William D. Hutchinson, 63, American politician and judge (United States Court of Appeals for the Third Circuit).
- Christopher Keene, 48, American conductor and director of the New York City Opera, AIDS.
- Jim Little, 57, Australian rules footballer.
- Kentarō Ogawa, 61, Japanese baseball player.
- Olavi Salsola, 61, Finnish middle-distance runner and Olympian (1956).
- Patric Walker, 64, American-British astrologer.
- Geoffrey Warnock, 72, English philosopher and Vice-Chancellor of Oxford University.

=== 9 ===
- Kamal Bose, 80, Indian cinematographer.
- Sagramor de Scuvero Brandão, 74, Brazilian actress and radio personality.
- Henry W. Clune, 105, American writer and journalist.
- Alec Douglas-Home, 92, Prime Minister of the United Kingdom.
- Zaim Imamović, 34, Bosnian commander, killed in action.
- Luis López, 26, Mexican Olympic gymnast (1992).
- Marja Obrębska, 91, Polish painter.
- Kukrit Pramoj, 84, Thai politician and 13th Prime Minister of Thailand, diabetes.
- John A. Scali, 77, American journalist and diplomat.

=== 10 ===
- Fateh Chand Badhwar, 94–95, Indian civil servant.
- Doug Cline, 57, American football player (Houston Oilers, San Diego Chargers).
- Robert Finch, 70, American politician, heart attack.
- Ed Gill, 100, American baseball player (Washington Senators).
- Paolo Gucci, 64, Italian businessman and fashion designer.
- Carl Barton Huffaker, 81, American biologist, ecologist and agricultural entomologist.
- Allan Jacobsen, 79, Australian rules footballer.
- Lars Näsman, 52, Finnish football player and coach.
- Doug Russell, 84, American gridiron football player (Chicago Cardinals, Cleveland Rams).

=== 11 ===
- Isolde Ahlgrimm, 81, Austrian harpsichordist and fortepianist.
- Donald Beckford, 88, Jamaican cricketer.
- Graciela Amaya de García, 100, Mexican feminist and labour organizer.
- Huang Yijun, 80, Chinese conductor and composer.
- Jeff York, 83, American actor (Old Yeller, The Postman Always Rings Twice, The Alaskans).

=== 12 ===
- Eleanor Aller, 78, American cellist.
- Harald Barlie, 58, Norwegian Greco-Roman wrestler and Olympian (1960, 1964, 1968, 1972).
- George Blaikie, 80, Australian author and journalist.
- Gary Bond, 55, English actor (Joseph and the Amazing Technicolor Dreamcoat, Anne of the Thousand Days, Wake in Fright) and singer, AIDS-related complications.
- Adolf Flubacher, 94, Swiss footballer and Olympian (1928).
- David McLean, 73, American actor, lung cancer.
- Edmundo Ohaco, 69, Chilean Olympic hurdler (1952).
- Hans Wärmling, 52, Swedish musician and songwriter, drowned.

=== 13 ===
- John Tyler Caldwell, 83, American academic and professor of political science.
- Geoffrey Chung, 44, Jamaican musician, recording engineer, and record producer, liver failure.
- Albert Dubreucq, 71, French footballer and coach.
- Michael Lah, 83, Slovenian-American animator.
- Henry Roth, 89, American novelist and short story writer.
- Béla Varga, 92, Hungarian Catholic priest and politician.
- Jean Weber, 89, French film actor.
- Herbert Weißbach, 93, German actor, cabaret artist, and voice actor.

=== 14 ===
- John R. P. French, 82, American psychologist.
- William Fritz, 81, Canadian sprinter and Olympian (1936).
- Robert Howell Hall, 73, American judge.
- Gunvor Hofmo, 74, Norwegian writer.
- Edith Pargeter, 82, English author.
- Helen Vlachos, 83, Greek journalist and anti-junta activist.
- Karl Widmark, 84, Swedish sprint canoeists.

=== 15 ===
- Akhat Bragin, 42, Ukrainian businessman, bomb attack.
- Marco Campos, 19, Brazilian racing driver, racing accident.
- Claudine Chomat, 80, French communist militant and member of the resistance during World War II.
- Marco Gavelli, 80, Italian Olympic wrestler (1936, 1948).
- Thelma Griffith Haynes, 82, Canadian-American Major League Baseball executive.
- Augusto Larrabure, 83, Peruvian Olympic sports shooter (1948).
- Eugenia Rusin, 62, Polish Olympic shot putter (1960).
- Bengt Åkerblom, 28, Swedish ice hockey player.

=== 16 ===
- Richard Caldicot, 87, British actor.
- Günther Happich, 43, Austrian football midfielder.
- Jimmie Lewallen, 76, American stock car racing driver, cancer.
- Augustine Martin, 59, Irish academic, writer, broadcaster and literary critic.
- Joe Pearce, 85, Australian rugby player and coach.
- Thoogudeepa Srinivas, 52, Indian film actor.
- Joe Szekely, 70, American baseball player (Cincinnati Redlegs).
- John Walker, 88, American art curator.

=== 17 ===
- Wal Alexander, 71, Australian rules footballer.
- Mike Brittain, 32, American basketball player (San Antonio Spurs).
- Peter Hinchliff, 66, South African Anglican priest and academic.
- Fachtna O'Donovan, 74, Irish sportsperson.
- Oza Tétrault, 87, Canadian politician, member of the House of Commons of Canada (1968–1974).
- Pál Zolnay, 67, Hungarian film director, screenwriter and actor.

=== 18 ===
- Claudio Brook, 68, Mexican actor, stomach cancer.
- Franco Fabrizi, 79, Italian actor, cancer.
- Ada Lois Sipuel Fisher, 71, American lawyer and civil rights activist.
- Edward Griffiths, 66, British politician.
- Lloyd Guenther, 88, American Olympic speed skater (1932).
- Bryan Johnson, 69, English singer and actor.
- Tommy Lyttle, 56, Irish Ulster loyalist and paramilitary, heart attack.
- William Mackey, 80, Canadian Catholic priest and Jesuit educator, sepsis.
- Ted Sturgis, 82, American jazz bassist.
- Ted Whiteaway, 66, British racing driver.

=== 19 ===
- Don Cherry, 58, American jazz trumpeter, liver cancer.
- Don Faurot, 93, American college football player and coach (Missouri Tigers).
- Norman Jones, 71, Canadian-born Bermudian Olympic sailor (1960).
- Kumari Naaz, 51, Indian film actress.
- Harilaos Perpessas, 88, Greek composer.
- Jaroslav Rudnyckyj, 84, Ukrainian-Canadian linguist, lexicographer, author and publicist.
- Don Williams, 59, Australian rules football player.

=== 20 ===
- George Allen, 67, Australian rules footballer.
- Eric Birley, 89, British historian and archaeologist.
- William D. Campbell, 88, American leader of the international Scouting movement.
- Riccardo Carapellese, 73, Italian football manager and player.
- Jack Rose, 83, American screenwriter.
- Christopher Stone, 53, American actor, heart attack.
- John Tonkin, 93, Australian politician.

=== 21 ===
- Maxene Andrews, 79, American singer and actress and member of The Andrews Sisters.
- Jesús Blasco, 75, Spanish comic book author.
- José Ignacio Cabrujas, 58, Venezuelan playwright and theater director, heart attack.
- Harold I. Cammer, 86, American lawyer who co-founded the National Lawyers Guild.
- Manuel Vázquez Gallego, 65, Spanish cartoonist.
- Linda Goodman, 70, American astrologer and poet, diabetes.
- Nancy Graves, 55, American sculptor, painter, and printmaker, ovarian cancer.
- Sverre Hansen, 76, Norwegian actor.
- Hans Helfritz, 93, German composer and photographer.
- Shannon Hoon, 28, American singer-songwriter, drug overdose.
- Egidio Massaria, 70, Italian Olympic swimmer (1952).
- Vada Pinson, 57, American baseball player and coach, stroke.
- Abel Salazar, 78, Mexican actor, producer and director, Alzheimer's disease.
- Anatoly Shelyukhin, 65, Soviet cross-country skier and Olympian (1956, 1960).

=== 22 ===
- Kingsley Amis, 73, English author (Lucky Jim, Jake's Thing, The Old Devils).
- Bob Campiglio, 87, American football player (Staten Island Stapletons, Boston Redskins).
- Mario Costa, 91, Italian actor, director and screenwriter.
- Simone Gallimard, 77, French editor and publisher, cancer.
- Frank Jordan, 90, Australian cricketer.
- Ralph Whitlock, 81, British farmer, conservationist, writer, and broadcaster.
- Mary Wickes, 85, American actress (White Christmas, Sister Act, The Hunchback of Notre Dame), complications following surgery.

=== 23 ===
- Bert Bandstra, 73, American politician, member of the United States House of Representatives (1965–1967).
- Johnny Bookman, 63, American gridiron football player (New York Giants, Dallas Texans, New York Titans).
- Helen Gilbert, 80, American film actress and musician.
- Don Pendleton, 67, American author of fiction and non-fiction books.

=== 24 ===
- Marion Adnams, 96, English painter, printmaker and draughtswoman.
- Jan Bartosik, 47, Polish Olympic sailor (1980).
- Syed Abuzar Bukhari, Pakistani scholar and president of Majlis-e-Ahrar-ul-Islam.
- Émile Jonassaint, 82, Haitian jurist and politician (1994).
- Hermann Langbein, 83, Austrian communist resistance fighter and historian.
- Lyman Linde, 75, American baseball player (Cleveland Indians).
- Andrés Aguilar Mawdsley, 71, Venezuelan lawyer and diplomat (b. 1924)
- Anna Wood, 15, Australian teenager, drug overdose.
- Ronnie Selby Wright, 87, Scottish Church of Scotland minister.

=== 25 ===
- Agha Saadat Ali, 66, Pakistani cricketer.
- François Brousse, 82, French philosophy professor and poet.
- Noel Crump, 78, New Zealand freestyle swimmer.
- Kenneth Dadzie, 65, Ghanaian diplomat and 1st African Secretary-General of UNCTAD.
- Gavin Ewart, 79, British poet.
- Robert Grieve, 84, Scottish civil servant and planner.
- David Healy, 66, American actor.
- Bernhard Heiliger, 79, German artist.
- Jan Hoffman, 89, Polish pianist and music educator.
- Milt Laurent, 93, American baseball player.
- Alan Lavers, 83, English cricketer.
- Viveca Lindfors, 74, Swedish actress, arthritis.
- Bobby Riggs, 77, American tennis player, prostate cancer.
- B. F. Sisk, 84, American politician, member of the United States House of Representatives (1955–1979).
- Miljenko Smoje, 72, Croatian writer and journalist, lung cancer.
- Peter Stallard, 80, British colonial governor.

=== 26 ===
- Kumbha Ram Arya, 81, Indian politician.
- Georgia Neese Clark Gray, 97, first woman Treasurer of the United States.
- Hamilton E. Holmes, 54, American orthopedic physician, heart failure.
- Wilhelm Freddie, 86, Danish painter.
- Fylymon Kurchaba, 81, Ukrainian Greek Catholic hierarch, auxiliary bishop of Lviv (since 1985).
- Henry Latulippe, 82, Canadian politician, member of the House of Commons of Canada (1962–1974).
- Jim Morgan, 71, Australian rules footballer.
- Thomas Francis Murphy, 89, American district judge (United States District Court for the Southern District of New York).
- John Sangster, 66, Australian jazz composer, arranger and multi-instrumentalist.

=== 27 ===
- André Berge, 93, French physician and psychoanalyst.
- Marta Colvin, 87–88, Chileán sculptor.
- Jacques Heurgon, 92, French historian and classical philologist.
- Mumtaz Mufti, 90, Pakistani writer.
- Stan Renehan, 65, American Olympic sailor (1956).
- Richard Ryder, 53, American actor, AIDS-related complications.
- John Scaife, 86, Australian cricketer.
- Slobodan Selenić, 62, Serbian writer, literary critic, and academic, cancer.

=== 28 ===
- Fouad Abdulhameed Alkhateeb, 69–70, Saudi Arabian ambassador, author, and businessman.
- Chingiz Babayev, 31, Azerbaijani officer and National Hero of Azerbaijan, killed in action.
- Thomas Bellew, 52, Irish politician.
- Julien Bertheau, 85, French actor.
- Edward Drabiński, 83, Polish football player and manager.
- Morris Williams, 71, Australian politician.

=== 29 ===
- Robert Boeser, 68, American Olympic ice hockey player (1948).
- Fred Gerbic, 63, New Zealand politician.
- Jean Heather, 74, American actress.
- Minna Lederman, 99, American editor and writer on music and dance.
- Al Niemiec, 84, American baseball second basemen and shortstop (Boston Red Sox, Philadelphia Athletics).
- Pierre Hornus, 87, French footballer
- Terry Southern, 71, American screenwriter (Dr. Strangelove, Easy Rider, Saturday Night Live) and author.
- Jimmy Swan, 81, American country musician.

=== 30 ===
- Louis Abolafia, 54, American artist and social activist, drug overdose.
- Paolo Alatri, 77, Italian historian and Marxist politician.
- Anastasios Balkos, 79, Greek Army lieutenant general and conservative politician.
- Stephen Bekassy, 88, Hungarian-born American film actor.
- Virginia Bradford, 95, American actress.
- Brian Easdale, 86, British composer of orchestral, choral and film music.
- Paul Ferris, 54, English film composer and actor, suicide.
- Doug Oldershaw, 80, American football player (New York Giants).
- Ermanno Pignatti, 74, Italian weightlifter and Olympian (1952, 1956).
- David M. Schneider, 76, American cultural anthropologist.

=== 31 ===
- Royal B. Allison, 76, United States Air Force lieutenant general, cancer.
- Word Baker, 72, American theatre director.
- Caroline Bammel, 55, English historian, classicist, and academic, cancer.
- Glenn Berry, 90, American Olympic gymnast (1928).
- Alan Bush, 94, British composer, pianist, and conductor.
- Jim Campbell, 71, American baseball executive (Detroit Tigers).
- Rosalind Cash, 56, American actress (The Omega Man, General Hospital, Klute), cancer.
- Derek Enright, 60, British Labour politician.
- Hans Grieder, 93, Swiss Olympic gymnast (1924, 1928).
- Dr. Hepcat, 82, American blues pianist, singer, and baseball commentator.
- Lou Levy, 84, American music publisher.
- Joel Mason, 83, American NFL football player (Chicago Cardinals, Green Bay Packers), and NBL basketball player.
- Mario Napolitano, 85, Italian chess master.
- Henry Percy, 11th Duke of Northumberland, 42, British peer, neurological disorder.
- Bill Rowling, 67, 30th Prime Minister of New Zealand, cancer.
