= 1995 in film =

The year 1995 in film involved many major film events. The highly anticipated sequel Die Hard with a Vengeance was the year's biggest box-office hit, and Braveheart won the Academy Award for Best Picture.

== Highest-grossing films ==
The top 10 films released in 1995 by worldwide gross are as follows:

Highest-grossing films of 1995
Rank	Title	Distributor	Worldwide gross
1	Die Hard with a Vengeance	20th Century Fox	$366,101,666
2	Toy Story	Buena Vista	$361,958,736 (Note: Excluding the gross from subsequent re-releases.)
3	Apollo 13	Universal	$355,237,933
4	GoldenEye	MGM	$352,194,034
5	Pocahontas	Buena Vista	$346,079,773
6	Batman Forever	Warner Bros.	$336,529,144
7	Seven	New Line	$327,311,859
8	Casper	Universal	$287,928,194
9	Waterworld	Universal	$264,218,220
10	Jumanji	Sony / TriStar	$262,797,249

=== Box office records ===
- The Batman franchise became the fifth film franchise to gross $1 billion with the release of Batman Forever.
  - Batman Forever is released in theaters and surpasses Jurassic Park for scoring the highest-opening weekend of all time, generating a total of $52.8 million.

=== Film records ===
- Dilwale Dulhania Le Jayenge, released this year, has been running in theatres in India for 30 years, making the longest running film in cinema history

=== Context ===
The theatrical box office of 1994 achieved record grosses, with nine films earning more than $100 million and the highest attendance (1.29 billion) since 1960 (1.3 billion). By 1995, however, the average cost of making and marketing a film had doubled since 1990, reaching $50.4 million, making turning a profit more difficult. The rising salary cost of actors was a contributing factor; studios vied to secure popular actors such as Harrison Ford, Jim Carrey, Tom Cruise, and Arnold Schwarzenegger who could generally guarantee a minimum level of box-office success and held broad appeal outside of the United States and Canada. If notable stars were unavailable, studios were forced to pay exorbitant salaries for less-well-known stars and pay other cast lower salaries to offset costs. In 1995, theatrical box-office revenue was falling; the first quarter was about $90 million lower than the same period in 1994. Markets outside of the U.S. and Canada were growing, accounting for 41% of a film's total revenue—including theatrical and home media profits—and outperformed the U.S. and Canadian box offices for the first time in 1994. Anticipated films such as Batman Forever, Crimson Tide, and Pocahontas were scheduled for release alongside Waterworld, the most-expensive film of its time.

== Events ==
- March 13 – The Dogme 95 movement is officially announced in Paris by Danish directors Lars von Trier and Thomas Vinterberg.
- April 10 – Matsushita Electric Industrial Co. sells 80% of MCA Inc., owner of Universal Pictures, to Seagram Company for $7 billion.
- May 12 – Crimson Tide is released, kicking off the Summer box office season with critical and commercial success.
- May 19 – Die Hard with a Vengeance is released in theaters and becomes the year's highest-grossing film (Toy Story overtook it in re-releases in 2009).
- May 24 – Braveheart is released to critical and commercial success. Directed by and starring Mel Gibson, it will go on to win 5 Academy Awards, including Best Picture and Best Director.
- May 27 – Actor Christopher Reeve (1952–2004) injured his spinal cord after falling off his horse in an equestrian competition. The injury paralysed him from the shoulders down, and he depended on a ventilator to breathe.
- June 10 – Pocahontas has the largest premiere ever for a film, premiering in Central Park, New York City, with an audience of 100,000 and free admission. The film received mixed reviews but was a commercial success at the worldwide box office.
- June 16 – Batman Forever is released in theaters and scores the highest-opening weekend of all time, generating a total of $52.8 million.
- November – Carolco Pictures files for Chapter 11 bankruptcy protection.
- November 17 – After a six-year hiatus, the James Bond film series resumes with the successful GoldenEye with Pierce Brosnan as James Bond.
- November 22 – Toy Story is released, marking the first feature-length film created completely using computer-generated imagery. Toy Story was both a commercial and critical success, and is considered by film historians as a significant turning point in film history.
- December 22 – Cutthroat Island is released and becomes one of the biggest box-office bombs of all time. Its massive failure caused Carolco Pictures to cease operations.
- unknown date – Trash Video, a Finnish independent film production company is established.

== Awards ==
Category/Organization	53rd Golden Globe Awards January 21, 1996		1st Critics' Choice Awards January 22, 1996	Producers, Directors, Screen Actors, and Writers Guild Awards	68th Academy Awards March 25, 1996	49th BAFTA Awards April 23, 1996
Category/Organization	Drama	Musical or Comedy	1st Critics' Choice Awards January 22, 1996	Producers, Directors, Screen Actors, and Writers Guild Awards	68th Academy Awards March 25, 1996	49th BAFTA Awards April 23, 1996
Best Film	Sense and Sensibility	Babe	Sense and Sensibility	Apollo 13	Braveheart	Sense and Sensibility
Best Director	Mel Gibson; Braveheart			Ron Howard; Apollo 13	Mel Gibson; Braveheart	Michael Radford; The Postman
Best Actor	Nicolas Cage; Leaving Las Vegas	John Travolta; Get Shorty	Kevin Bacon; Murder in the First	Nicolas Cage; Leaving Las Vegas		Nigel Hawthorne; The Madness of King George
Best Actress	Sharon Stone; Casino	Nicole Kidman; To Die For		Susan Sarandon; Dead Man Walking		Emma Thompson; Sense and Sensibility
Best Supporting Actor	Brad Pitt; 12 Monkeys		Kevin Spacey; The Usual Suspects; Ed Harris; Apollo 13	Ed Harris; Apollo 13	Kevin Spacey; The Usual Suspects	Tim Roth; Rob Roy
Best Supporting Actress	Mira Sorvino; Mighty Aphrodite			Kate Winslet; Sense and Sensibility	Mira Sorvino; Mighty Aphrodite	Kate Winslet; Sense and Sensibility
Best Screenplay, Adapted	Emma Thompson; Sense and Sensibility			Emma Thompson; Sense and Sensibility		John Hodge; Trainspotting
Best Screenplay, Original	Emma Thompson; Sense and Sensibility			Randall Wallace; Braveheart	Christopher McQuarrie; The Usual Suspects	
Best Original Score	A Walk in the Clouds; Maurice Jarre		N/A	N/A	The Postman; Luis Bacalov	
Best Original Song	"Colors of the Wind"; Pocahontas		N/A	N/A	"Colors of the Wind"; Pocahontas	N/A
Best Foreign Language Film	Les Misérables		The Postman	N/A	Antonia	The Postman

Palme d'Or (Cannes Film Festival):

Underground (Podzemlje), directed by Emir Kusturica, Yugoslavia

Golden Lion (Venice Film Festival):

Cyclo (Xích lô), directed by Anh Hung Tran, Vietnam / France

Golden Bear (Berlin Film Festival):

The Bait (L'appât), directed by Bertrand Tavernier, France

People's Choice Award (Toronto International Film Festival):

Antonia's Line, directed by Marleen Gorris, Netherlands

== 1995 films ==
=== By country/region ===
- List of American films of 1995
- List of Argentine films of 1995
- List of Australian films of 1995
- List of Bangladeshi films of 1995
- List of British films of 1995
- List of Canadian films of 1995
- List of French films of 1995
- List of Hong Kong films of 1995
- List of Indian films of 1995
  - List of Hindi films of 1995
  - List of Kannada films of 1995
  - List of Malayalam films of 1995
  - List of Marathi films of 1995
  - List of Tamil films of 1995
  - List of Telugu films of 1995
- List of Japanese films of 1995
- List of Mexican films of 1995
- List of Pakistani films of 1995
- List of Russian films of 1995
- List of South Korean films of 1995
- List of Spanish films of 1995

=== By genre/medium ===
- List of action films of 1995
- List of animated feature films of 1995
- List of avant-garde films of 1995
- List of crime films of 1995
- List of comedy films of 1995
- List of drama films of 1995
- List of horror films of 1995
- List of science fiction films of 1995
- List of thriller films of 1995
- List of western films of 1995

== Births ==
- January 5 – Whindersson Nunes, Brazilian YouTuber and actor
- January 7
  - Jessica Darrow, American actress and singer
  - Leslie Grace, American singer, songwriter and actress
- January 9 – Nicola Peltz, American actress
- January 13
  - Natalia Dyer, American actress
  - Eros Vlahos, English-Greek actor and comedian
- January 17 – Indya Moore, American actor
- January 24
  - Dylan Everett, Canadian actor
  - Callan McAuliffe, Australian actor
- January 30 – Danielle Campbell, American actress
- February 2 – Tom Blyth, English actor
- February 7 – Tom Glynn-Carney, English actor and singer
- February 10
  - Archie Madekwe, English actor
  - Adeline Rudolph, Hong Kong actress
- February 28 – Madisen Beaty, American actress
- March 4 – Bill Milner, English actor
- March 7 – Haley Lu Richardson, American actress
- March 19 - Philip Daniel Bolden, American actor
- March 20 – Samantha Weinstein, Canadian actress (died 2023)
- March 21 – RJ Cyler, American actor
- March 22 – Nick Robinson, American actor
- March 23 – Victoria Pedretti, American actress
- March 30 – Simone Ashley, English actress
- April 1 – Logan Paul, American pro wrestler, actor, and YouTuber
- April 10 - Ian Nelson, American actor
- April 17
  - Phoebe Dynevor, English actress
  - Paulie Litt, American former actor and producer
- April 18 – Virginia Gardner, American actress
- April 19 – Patrick Gibson, Irish actor
- April 24 – Ludmilla, Brazilian singer-songwriter and actress
- May 3
  - Katie Chang, American actress
  - Emma Seligman, Canadian film director and screenwriter
- May 4
  - Alex Lawther, English actor
  - Shameik Moore, American actor, singer and rapper
- May 5 – Devon Gearhart, American actor
- May 11 – Shira Haas, Israeli actress
- May 12 – Sawyer Sweeten, American child actor (died 2015)
- May 13 – Taylor John Smith, American actor
- May 25
  - Brandon Perea, American actor
  - Rei Ami, South Korean-American singer and rapper
- May 28 – Jacob Kogan, American actor
- June 4 – Gustav Lindh, Swedish actor
- June 5 – Troye Sivan, Australian singer-songwriter and actor
- June 6 – Jack Kilmer, American actor
- June 8 – Harumi Sato, Japanese actress and dancer
- June 19 – Blake Woodruff, American actor
- June 20 – Geraldine Viswanathan, Australian actress
- June 22 – Micheál Richardson, Irish-American actor
- July 4 – Post Malone, American rapper
- July 9 – Georgie Henley, English actress
- July 11 – Blu Hunt, American actress
- July 12 – Mason Alexander Park, American actor
- August 4 – Bruna Marquezine, Brazilian actress
- August 6 – Amy Forsyth, Canadian actress
- August 7
  - Sasha Calle, American actress
  - Josha Stradowski, Dutch actor
- August 9 – Justice Smith, American actor
- August 18 – Alexa Davies, Welsh actress
- August 20 – Liana Liberato, American actress
- August 22 – Dua Lipa, English singer and actress
- August 26 – Gracie Dzienny, American actress
- September 4 – Lola Tash, Canadian former actress
- September 5 - Caroline Sunshine, American former actress
- September 12 – Ryan Potter, American actor
- September 13 - Robbie Kay, British actor
- September 19 – Rachel Sennott, American actress
- September 20 – Sammi Hanratty, American actress
- September 22 – Juliette Goglia, American actress
- September 27 - Daeg Faerch, American actor and singer-songwriter
- September 29 – Sasha Lane, American actress
- October 3
  - Ayo Edebiri, American comedian, writer, producer and actress
  - Hailey McCann, former American child actress
- October 13 – Park Ji-min, Korean singer, songwriter and dancer
- October 24 – Ashton Sanders, American actor and model
- November 1 - Ishaan Khatter, Indian actor
- November 2 – Brandon Soo Hoo, American actor and martial artist
- November 3 – Alice Wegmann, Brazilian actress
- November 6 – John Owen Lowe, American writer, producer and actor
- November 7 – Sophia Ali, American actress
- November 9 – Finn Cole, English actor
- November 15 – Amy James-Kelly, British Actress
- November 17 – Zach Barack, American actor, singer and comedian
- November 22 – Katherine McNamara, American actress
- November 23 – Austin Majors, American actor (died 2023)
- November 27
  - Ricardo Hoyos, Canadian actor
  - Jamila Velazquez, American singer and actress
- November 29
  - Liv Hewson, Australian actor
  - Laura Marano, American actress, singer
- December 5 – Hadley Robinson, American actress
- December 13 – Emma Corrin, British actor
- December 25 – Charlee Fraser, Australian actress
- December 26 – Lola Petticrew, Northern Irish actor
- December 27
  - Laurence Belcher, English actor
  - Timothée Chalamet, American and French actor
- December 29 – Ross Lynch, American actor, singer, dancer
- December 30 – Kim Tae-hyung, Korean singer, songwriter and dancer

== Deaths ==
Month	Date	Name	Age	Country	Profession	Notable films
January	2	Nancy Kelly	73	US	Actress	The Bad Seed; Jesse James
January	2	Frances E. Williams	89	US	Actress	Lying Lips; The Jerk
January	4	Dorothy Granger	82	US	Actress	The Dentist; When the Daltons Rode
January	7	Ted Tetzlaff	91	US	Cinematographer	Notorious; My Man Godfrey
January	9	Peter Cook	57	UK	Actor	The Princess Bride; Bedazzled
January	10	Roy Ashton	85	Australia	Makeup Artist	Dracula; The Private Life of Sherlock Holmes
January	11	Onat Kutlar	58	Turkey	Producer, Screenwriter	A Season in Hakkari
January	12	Kay Aldridge	77	US	Actress	Daredevils of the West; Down Argentine Way
January	21	John Halas	82	UK	Animator, Director	Animal Farm; Heavy Metal
January	24	Edward Colman	89	US	Cinematographer	Mary Poppins; The Absent-Minded Professor
January	25	John Smith	63	US	Actor	Circus World; Hot Rod Girl
January	25	William Sylvester	72	US	Actor	2001: A Space Odyssey; Devil Doll
January	26	Gordon Oliver	84	US	Actor	Seven Days Ashore; The Spiral Staircase
January	26	Pat Welsh	79	US	Actress	E.T. the Extra-Terrestrial; Return of the Jedi
January	27	Robert Totten	57	US	Director	The Quick and the Dead; The Wild Country
January	31	George Abbott	107	US	Director	Damn Yankees; The Pajama Game
February	2	Phillip Borsos	41	Australia	Director	The Grey Fox; Bethune: The Making of a Hero
February	2	Donald Pleasence	75	UK	Actor	Halloween; The Great Escape
February	2	Willard Waterman	80	US	Actor	The Apartment; Mystery Street
February	4	Abel Santa Cruz	79	Argentina	Screenwriter	Al Compás de tu Mentira; The Age of Love
February	5	Doug McClure	59	US	Actor	The Enemy Below; The Land That Time Forgot
February	8	Rachel Thomas	89	UK	Actress	The Proud Valley; Under Milk Wood
February	9	David Wayne	81	US	Actor	The Andromeda Strain; Adam's Rib
February	14	Michael V. Gazzo	71	US	Actor	The Godfather Part II; A Hatful of Rain
February	16	Lois Wilde	87	US	Actress	Undersea Kingdom; The Singing Cowboy
February	19	John Howard	81	US	Actor	The Philadelphia Story; Bulldog Drummond's Secret Police
February	21	Robert Bolt	79	UK	Screenwriter, Director	Lawrence of Arabia; Doctor Zhivago
February	21	Calder Willingham	72	US	Screenwriter	The Graduate; Paths of Glory
February	22	Ed Flanders	60	US	Actor	The Exorcist III; MacArthur
February	22	Nicholas Pennell	56	UK	Actor	Battle of Britain; Isadora
February	23	John Paul	73	UK	Actor	Cromwell; Doomwatch
February	24	John J. Carney	54	UK	Actor	A Clockwork Orange; Top Secret!
February	26	Jack Clayton	73	UK	Director	Room at the Top; The Pumpkin Eater
February	27	Ann Ayars	76	US	Singer, Actress	The Tales of Hoffmann; Dr. Kildare's Victory
March	1	Herb Meadow	83	US	Screenwriter	The Strange Woman; The Master of Ballantrae
March	3	Al Christy	76	US	Actor	When Harry Met Sally...; In Cold Blood
March	3	Douglas Stewart	75	US	Film Editor	The Right Stuff; Invasion of the Body Snatchers
March	5	Nancy O'Neil	83	Australia	Actress	Twelve Good Men; There Was a Young Man
March	10	Irene Tedrow	87	US	Actress	The Cincinnati Kid; Foul Play
March	12	Juanin Clay	45	US	Actress	WarGames; The Legend of the Lone Ranger
March	15	Albert Hackett	95	US	Screenwriter	It's a Wonderful Life; Father of the Bride
March	17	Rick Aviles	42	US	Actor	Ghost; Waterworld
March	20	Big John Studd	47	US	Actor	Harley Davidson and the Marlboro Man; Micki & Maude
March	21	Robert Urquhart	73	UK	Actor	The Dogs of War; The Curse of Frankenstein
March	27	Paul Brinegar	77	US	Actor	High Plains Drifter; Maverick
March	29	Antony Hamilton	42	UK	Actor	Nocturna: Granddaughter of Dracula; Jumpin' Jack Flash
April	4	Priscilla Lane	79	US	Actress, Singer	Saboteur; Arsenic and Old Lace
April	12	Philip H. Lathrop	82	US	Cinematographer	The Pink Panther; They Shoot Horses, Don't They?
April	13	Allan Scott	88	US	Screenwriter	So Proudly We Hail!; Imitation of Life
April	14	Burl Ives	85	US	Actor, Singer	Cat on a Hot Tin Roof; East of Eden
April	15	Gilbert Moses	52	US	Director	Willie Dynamite; The Fish That Saved Pittsburgh
April	16	Cy Endfield	80	US	Director, Screenwriter	Zulu; Night of the Demon
April	16	Arthur English	75	UK	Actor	Are You Being Served?; The Boys in Blue
April	16	Alfred Ryder	79	US	Actor	True Grit; Invitation to a Gunfighter
April	21	Tessie O'Shea	82	UK	Actress	Bedknobs and Broomsticks; The Russians Are Coming, the Russians Are Coming
April	25	Art Fleming	70	US	Actor	MacArthur; Airplane II: The Sequel
April	25	Alexander Knox	88	Canada	Actor, Screenwriter, Director	Sister Kenny; The Longest Day
April	25	Ginger Rogers	83	US	Actress, Dancer	Top Hat; Kitty Foyle
April	27	Katherine DeMille	83	Canada	Actress	Charlie Chan at the Olympics; Unconquered
April	30	Christopher Chadman	47	US	Choreographer	The Muppets Take Manhattan; Scenes from a Mall
April	30	Michael Graham Cox	57	UK	Actor	A Bridge Too Far; The Lord of the Rings
May	2	Edwin Blum	88	US	Screenwriter	Stalag 17; The Canterville Ghost
May	2	Don Brockett	65	US	Actor	The Silence of the Lambs; Flashdance
May	2	Michael Hordern	83	UK	Actor	Cleopatra; Gandhi
May	11	John Philips	80	UK	Actor	Quadrophenia; Becket
May	12	Arthur Lubin	96	US	Director	Phantom of the Opera; Rhubarb
May	13	Alan Maley	64	UK	Visual Effects Artist, Matte Painter	Raiders of the Lost Ark; The Spy Who Loved Me
May	15	Eric Porter	67	UK	Actor	The Day of the Jackal; Nicholas and Alexandra
May	18	Elisha Cook Jr.	91	US	Actor	Shane; The Maltese Falcon
May	18	Alexander Godunov	45	Russia	Actor, Dancer	Die Hard; Witness
May	18	Elizabeth Montgomery	62	US	Actress	Johnny Cool; The Court-Martial of Billy Mitchell
May	19	Hans Jürgen Kiebach	64	Germany	Production Designer, Art Director	Cabaret; For the First Time
May	22	Robert Flemyng	83	UK	Actor	Funny Face; The Man Who Never Was
May	25	Alice Day	89	US	Actress	Hot Curves; The Lady from Nowhere
May	25	Dany Robin	68	France	Actress	Topaz; Don't Lose Your Head
May	26	Tony Azito	46	US	Actor	The Addams Family; Moonstruck
May	26	Friz Freleng	89	US	Animator, Director, Producer	The Pink Panther; The Looney Looney Looney Bugs Bunny Movie
May	27	Severn Darden	65	US	Actor	The President's Analyst; Vanishing Point
May	28	Daniela Rocca	57	Italy	Actress	Divorce, Italian Style; Esther and the King
June	3	Dilys Powell	93	UK	Film Critic	None; critiqued films for The Sunday Times
June	5	Patricia Dane	75	US	Actress	Grand Central Murder; Johnny Eager
June	6	Savely Kramarov	60	Russia	Actor	2010: The Year We Make Contact; Moscow on the Hudson
June	7	Joseph Tomelty	84	Ireland	Actor	A Night to Remember; Moby Dick
June	10	Bruno Lawrence	54	UK	Actor	The Quiet Earth; Spotswood
June	14	Jack Chertok	88	US	Producer	The Conspirators; The Strange Woman
June	14	Timothy Scott	57	US	Actor	Butch Cassidy and the Sundance Kid; Footloose
June	15	Charles Bennett	95	UK	Screenwriter	The Man Who Knew Too Much; The Big Circus
June	17	Clarence Greene	81	US	Screenwriter	D.O.A.; Pillow Talk
June	18	Arthur Howard	85	UK	Actor	Moonraker; Steptoe and Son
June	20	Julian Blaustein	82	US	Producer	The Day the Earth Stood Still; Bell, Book and Candle
June	23	Emile Santiago	96	US	Costume Designer	The Robe; The Big Country
June	27	Yoni Chen	41	Israel	Actor	The Band; Dizengoff 99
June	29	Roy Rowland	84	US	Director	Our Vines Have Tender Grapes; Hit the Deck
June	29	Lana Turner	74	US	Actress	The Bad and the Beautiful; The Postman Always Rings Twice
June	30	Gale Gordon	89	US	Actor	Don't Give Up the Ship; Speedway
July	1	Wolfman Jack	57	US	Actor	American Graffiti; Motel Hell
July	2	John C. Higgins	87	Canada	Screenwriter	Raw Deal; T-Men
July	4	Eva Gabor	76	Hungary	Actress	Gigi; The Rescuers
July	12	Gordon Flemyng	61	UK	Director	Dr. Who and the Daleks; The Split
July	17	Harry Guardino	69	US	Actor	Dirty Harry; Any Which Way You Can
July	26	Eleanore Griffin	91	US	Screenwriter	Boys Town; Imitation of Life
July	27	Miklós Rózsa	88	Hungary	Composer	Spellbound; Ben-Hur
July	30	Alfredo Giannetti	71	Italy	Screenwriter, Director	Divorce Italian Style; 1870
July	31	Genevieve Tobin	95	US	Actress	One Hour with You; The Petrified Forest
August	1	Phyllis Brooks	80	US	Actress	Little Miss Broadway; In Old Chicago
August	1	Esther Muir	92	US	Actress	A Day at the Races; Fury
August	2	Al Adamson	66	US	Director	Dracula vs. Frankenstein; Black Samurai
August	2	Lillian Bronson	92	US	Actress	In the Good Old Summertime; Spencer's Mountain
August	2	Janet Ward	70	US	Actress	Fail Safe; Night Moves
August	3	Ida Lupino	77	UK	Actress, Director	High Sierra; They Drive by Night
August	7	David Begelman	73	US	Studio Executive	
August	8	Carol Hughes	85	US	Actress	Flash Gordon Conquers the Universe; Gold Mine in the Sky
August	9	Peter Carew	72	US	Actor	Scent of a Woman; Blue Velvet
August	10	Donald Bisset	84	UK	Actor	Warlords of Atlantis; Ragtime
August	11	Phil Harris	91	US	Actor	The Jungle Book; The High and the Mighty
August	11	Howard Koch	93	US	Screenwriter	Casablanca; Sergeant York
August	16	Walter Cartier	71	US	Actor	Day of the Fight; Somebody Up There Likes Me
August	17	Helen Christie	80	UK	Actress	Rasputin the Mad Monk; Lust for a Vampire
August	18	Dick Hogan	77	US	Actor	Rope; Action in the North Atlantic
August	18	James Maxwell	66	US	Actor	Otley; Far from the Madding Crowd
August	19	Danny Arnold	70	US	Screenwriter	The Caddy; The War Between Men and Women
August	21	Nanni Loy	69	Italy	Director, Screenwriter	The Four Days of Naples; Café Express
August	24	Gary Crosby	62	US	Actor	Girl Happy; Mardi Gras
August	27	Mary Beth Hughes	75	US	Actress	The Ox-Bow Incident; The Great Profile
August	29	Frank Perry	65	US	Producer, Director	Mommie Dearest; David and Lisa
August	31	Mildred Coles	75	US	Actress	Lady Scarface; Play Girl
August	31	David Farrar	87	UK	Actor	Black Narcissus; Solomon and Sheba
August	31	Carmen Mathews	84	US	Actress	Sounder; A Rage to Live
September	1	Benay Venuta	84	US	Actress	Annie Get Your Gun; Bullets Over Broadway
September	5	John Megna	42	US	Actor	To Kill a Mockingbird; Smokey and the Bandit II
September	6	Ralph Rosenblum	69	US	Film Editor	Annie Hall; The Producers
September	9	Ron Talsky	60	US	Costume Designer	The Three Musketeers; The Deep
September	9	Keith Wayne	50	US	Actor	Night of the Living Dead
September	10	Derek Meddings	64	UK	Visual Effects Artist	Batman; Superman
September	12	Jeremy Brett	61	UK	Actor	My Fair Lady; War and Peace
September	12	Tom Helmore	91	UK	Actor	Vertigo; The Time Machine
September	14	Eiji Okada	74	Japan	Actor	Hiroshima mon amour; Woman in the Dunes
September	17	Grady Sutton	89	US	Actor	Alice Adams; The Bank Dick
September	29	Susan Fleetwood	51	UK	Actress	Clash of the Titans; Young Sherlock Holmes
October	5	Linda Gary	50	US	Voice Actress	Pinocchio and the Emperor of the Night; Happily Ever After
October	6	Anthony Newlands	69	UK	Actor	Room at the Top; Scream and Scream Again
October	9	Armin Ganz	47	US	Production Designer	Bull Durham; Tucker: The Man and His Dream
October	11	Jeff York	83	US	Actor	The Postman Always Rings Twice; Johnny Tremain
October	12	Gary Bond	55	UK	Actor	Zulu; Anne of the Thousand Days
October	15	Claudio Brook	68	Mexico	Actor	Alucarda; Licence to Kill
October	20	Christopher Stone	53	US	Actor	Cujo; The Howling
October	21	Maxene Andrews	79	US	Singer, Actress	Buck Privates; In the Navy
October	21	Jack Rose	83	Poland	Screenwriter	Houseboat; A Touch of Class
October	22	Mary Wickes	85	US	Actress	White Christmas; Sister Act
October	25	David Healy	66	US	Actor	Patton; Labyrinth
October	25	Viveca Lindfors	74	Sweden	Actress	The Way We Were; Stargate
October	29	Jean Heather	79	US	Actress	Double Indemnity; Going My Way
October	29	Terry Southern	71	US	Screenwriter	Dr. Strangelove; Easy Rider
October	30	Brian Easdale	86	UK	Composer	Peeping Tom; The Red Shoes
October	30	Paul Ferris	54	UK	Composer	Witchfinder General; The Creeping Flesh
October	31	Rosalind Cash	56	US	Actress	The Omega Man; The New Centurions
November	3	John Orchard	66	UK	Actor	Bedknobs and Broomsticks; The Thomas Crown Affair
November	4	Paul Eddington	68	UK	Actor	The Devil Rides Out; The Amazing Mr. Blunden
November	4	Eddie Egan	65	US	Actor	The French Connection; Prime Cut
November	6	Aneta Corsaut	62	US	Actress	The Blob; The Toolbox Murders
November	7	John Patrick	90	US	Screenwriter	The Shoes of the Fisherman; Some Came Running
November	9	Alessandro Cicognini	89	Italy	Composer	Bicycle Thieves; Umberto D.
November	9	Robert O. Cook	92	US	Sound Engineer	The Jungle Book; Mary Poppins
November	10	Arthur Loew Jr.	69	US	Producer	The Affairs of Dobie Gillis; Penelope
November	12	Robert Stephens	64	UK	Actor	The Prime of Miss Jean Brodie; The Private Life of Sherlock Holmes
November	13	Ralph Blane	81	US	Composer, Lyricist	Meet Me in St. Louis; Good News
November	21	Dorothy Jeakins	81	US	Costume Designer	The Sound of Music; True Grit
November	22	Ronald Kinnoch	85	UK	Producer, Screenwriter	Village of the Damned; Devil Doll
November	23	Louis Malle	63	France	Director	Atlantic City; Elevator to the Gallows
November	24	Jeffrey Lynn	86	US	Actor	A Letter to Three Wives; The Roaring Twenties
December	3	Jimmy Jewel	85	UK	Actor	The Krays; American Friends
December	3	Joseph Vásquez	33	US	Director, Screenwriter	Hangin' with the Homeboys; Street Hitz
December	4	Robert Parrish	79	US	Director, Actor	Casino Royale; Fire Down Below
December	6	Robert Phalen	58	US	Actor	Halloween; Starman
December	7	Harry Cordwell	73	UK	Set Decorator	Empire of the Sun; Victor Victoria
December	7	Kathleen Harrison	103	UK	Actress	Scrooge; Cast a Dark Shadow
December	8	George J. Lewis	91	US	Actor	Casablanca; Shane
December	9	Vivian Blaine	74	US	Actress, Singer	Guys and Dolls; State Fair
December	10	Paul Lohmann	69	US	Cinematographer	Nashville; Silent Movie
December	11	Arthur Mullard	85	UK	Actor	Morgan – A Suitable Case for Treatment; Chitty Chitty Bang Bang
December	17	Lexie Bigham	27	US	Actor	Seven; Dave
December	18	Ross Thomas	69	US	Screenwriter	Hammett; Bad Company
December	19	Jack Hively	85	US	Director, Film Editor	Father Takes a Wife; The Saint in Palm Springs
December	20	Madge Sinclair	57	Jamaica	Actor	Coming to America; The Lion King
December	22	Butterfly McQueen	84	US	Actress	Gone with the Wind; The Mosquito Coast
December	23	Patric Knowles	84	UK	Actor	The Adventures of Robin Hood; How Green Was My Valley
December	25	Dean Martin	78	US	Singer, Actor	Ocean's 11; Rio Bravo
December	26	Geoffrey Drake	83-84	??	Production Designer	The Guns of Navarone; Jason and the Argonauts
December	30	Doris Grau	71	US	Actress, Script Supervisor	Babe; The Distinguished Gentleman
December	30	Richard Hornung	45	US	Costume Designer	Barton Fink; Miller's Crossing

== Film debuts ==
- Jon Abrahams – Kids
- Casey Affleck – To Die For
- Adewale Akinnuoye-Agbaje – Congo
- Michael Bay (director) – Bad Boys
- Drake Bell – Drifting School
- Camilla Belle – A Little Princess
- Connie Britton – The Brothers McMullen
- Edward Burns – The Brothers McMullen
- Scott Caan – A Boy Called Hate
- Fulvio Cecere – Assassins
- Emmanuelle Chriqui – The Donor
- Enrico Colantoni – Money Train
- Rachael Leigh Cook – The Baby-Sitters Club
- Jennifer Coolidge – Love and Happiness
- David Cross – Destiny Turns on the Radio
- Rosario Dawson – Kids
- Peter Dinklage – Living in Oblivion
- John Doman – Die Hard with a Vengeance
- Colman Domingo – Timepiece
- Jeffrey Donovan – Throwing Down
- Minnie Driver – Circle of Friends
- Michael Clarke Duncan – Friday
- Peter Facinelli – Angela
- John Farley – Tommy Boy
- Kevin Farley – Tommy Boy
- Colin Farrell – Frankie Starlight
- Will Ferrell – Criminal Hearts
- Leo Fitzpatrick – Kids
- Tommy Flanagan – Braveheart
- Shawn Hatosy – Home for the Holidays
- Jessica Hecht – Joe's Rotten World
- Natasha Henstridge – Species
- Aldis Hodge – Die Hard with a Vengeance
- Hassan Johnson – Clockers
- Tamala Jones – How to Make an American Quilt
- Keira Knightley – Innocent Lies
- Johnny Knoxville – Desert Blues
- David Koechner – It's Now... or NEVER!
- Jared Leto – How to Make an American Quilt
- Ken Leung – Pictures of Baby Jane Doe
- Ruby Lin – School Days
- Chad Lindberg – Born to be Wild
- Eric Mabius – Welcome to the Dollhouse
- Norm Macdonald – Billy Madison
- Heather Matarazzo – Welcome to the Dollhouse
- James McAvoy – The Near Room
- Debra Messing – A Walk in the Clouds
- Dina Meyer – Johnny Mnemonic
- Ivana Miličević – Children of the Corn III: Urban Harvest
- Jay Mohr – For Better or Worse
- Nicole Ari Parker – The Incredibly True Adventure of Two Girls in Love
- Paula Jai Parker – Friday
- Amanda Peet – Animal Room
- Mekhi Phifer – Clockers
- Ryan Phillippe – Crimson Tide
- Geoff Pierson – Two Bits
- Franka Potente – After Five in the Forest Primeval
- James Purefoy – Feast of July
- Jeremy Renner – National Lampoon's Senior Trip
- Giovanni Ribisi – Mind Ripper
- Emilio Rivera – My Family
- Paul Rudd – Clueless
- Peter Sarsgaard – Dead Man Walking
- Steve Schirripa – Casino
- Élie Semoun – The Three Brothers
- Chloë Sevigny – Kids
- Brendan Sexton III – Welcome to the Dollhouse
- Michael Sheen – Othello
- Ethan Suplee – Mallrats
- Saïd Taghmaoui – La Haine
- Charlize Theron – Children of the Corn III: Urban Harvest
- James Van Der Beek – Angus
- Dominic West – Richard III
- Johnny Whitworth – Bye Bye Love
- Rumer Willis – Now and Then
