= Allan Jacobsen =

Allan Jacobsen may refer to:

- Allan Jacobsen (rugby union) (born 1978), Scottish rugby union player
- Allan Jacobsen (cyclist) (born 1955), Danish cyclist
- Allan Jacobsen (Australian footballer) (1916–1995), Australian rules footballer
