= Trash =

Trash may refer to:

- Garbage, unwanted or undesired waste material
  - Litter, material discarded in inappropriate places
  - Municipal solid waste, unwanted or undesired waste material generated in a municipal environment

It may also refer to:

== Arts, entertainment, and media ==
=== Art ===
- Trash art, artworks created from discarded objects

=== Films, TV, videogames ===
- "Trash", a video game term
- Trash (1970 film), an American film
- Trash (2011 film), a Canadian drama film
- Trash (2014 film), a British film
- "Trash" (Firefly), an episode of the TV series
- Trash (video game), a multiplayer real-time strategy
- Trash TV, a form of television programming considered to be tasteless and unprofessional
- Trash Video, a Finnish film production company
- Z movie, a low-budget exploitation movie category

=== Literature ===
- Trash (comics), a Marvel Comics organisation
- Trash (manga), a manga created by Sanami Matoh
- Trash (novel), a 2010 novel by Andy Mulligan
- Trash: Short Stories, a 1988 publication by Dorothy Allison

=== Music ===
==== Bands ====
- Trash (band), a British band also known as White Trash

==== Albums ====
- Trash (The Stalin album), the first full-length album by Japanese hardcore punk group The Stalin
- Trash (Alice Cooper album), a 1989 album by singer Alice Cooper

==== Songs ====
- "Trash" (New York Dolls song), a 1973 song by the New York Dolls
- "Trash" (Roxy Music song), a 1979 song by Roxy Music from Manifesto
- "Trash" (Suede song), the leading single of Suede's Coming Up album
- "Trash", a song by Berlin from Count Three & Pray
- "Trash", a song by Robin Gibb from Sesame Street Fever
- "Trash", a song by Korn from Issues
- "Trash", a song by Morrissey from Live in Dallas
- "Trash", a song by The Doll, 1977
- "Trash", a song by The Whip

== Brands and enterprises ==
- Trash (nightclub), a popular London indie–electroelectro nightclub run by Erol Alkan from 1997 until 2007
- Trash and Vaudeville, clothing vendors

== Other uses ==
- Trash (computing), a way in which operating systems dispose of unwanted files. Called a "Recycle Bin" on Microsoft Windows
- Junk food
- Trash Doves, viral Facebook meme

== See also ==
- Recycle bin
- Trash bag
- Trash can
- Trash culture
- Trash talk
- White trash (disambiguation)
