= Kim Young-kwang (footballer, born 1983) =

South Korean footballer (born 1983)

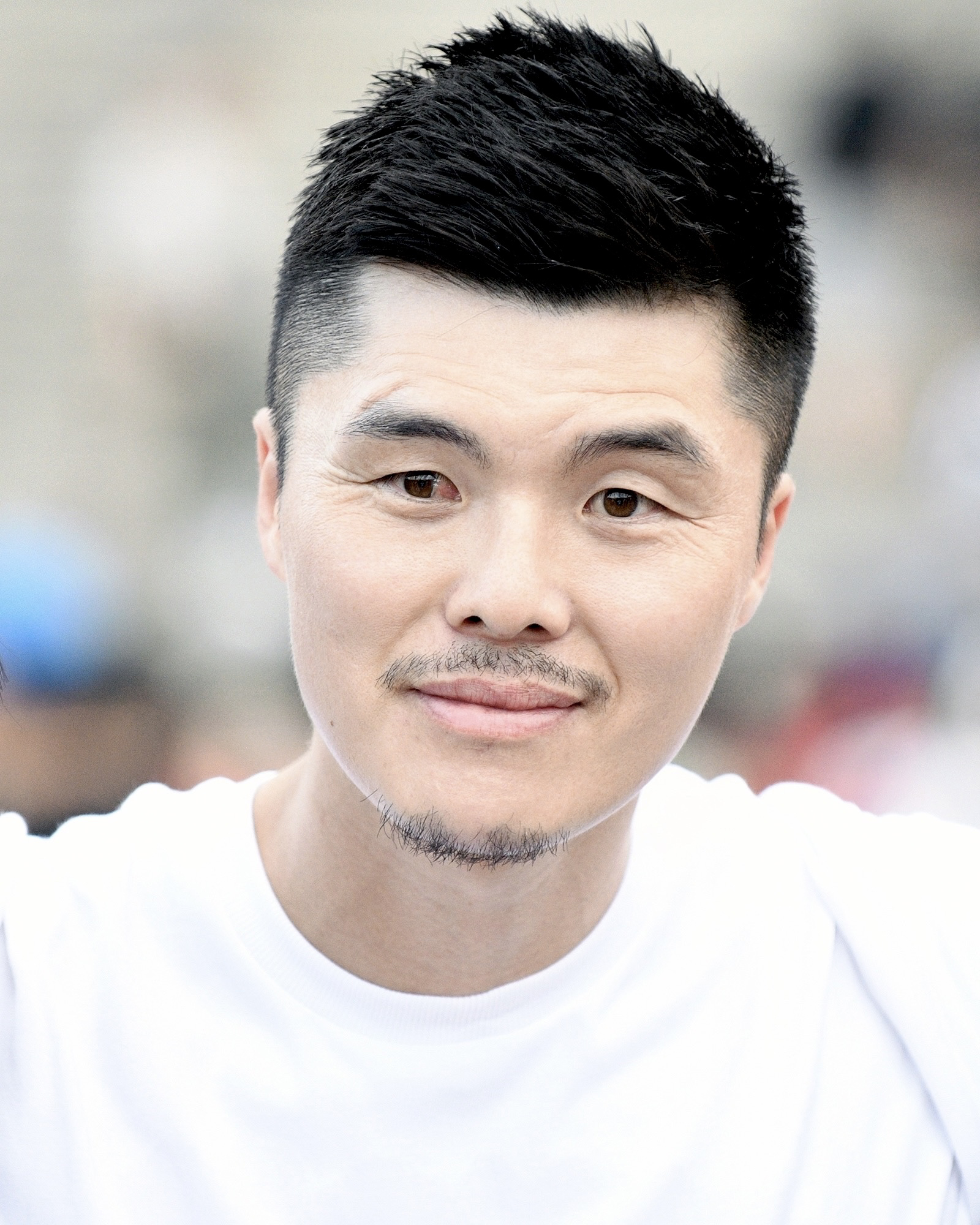
- Kim in 2024

Personal information
- Date of birth: 28 June 1983 (age 43)
- Place of birth: Goheung, South Jeolla, South Korea
- Height: 1.83 m (6 ft 0 in)
- Position: Goalkeeper

Youth career
- Hanlyo University

Senior career*
Years	Team	Apps	(Gls)
2002–2006	Chunnam Dragons	64	(0)
2007–2014	Ulsan Hyundai	163	(0)
2014	→ Gyeongnam FC (loan)	32	(0)
2015–2019	Seoul E-Land	148	(0)
2020–2023	Seongnam FC	95	(0)

International career
1998	South Korea U17	7	(0)
2002–2003	South Korea U20	23	(0)
2003–2006	South Korea U23	31	(0)
2004–2012	South Korea	17	(0)
- * Club domestic league appearances and goals as of 22 October 2022

- Kim Young-kwang
- Hangul: 김영광
- Hanja: 金永光
- RR: Gim Yeonggwang
- MR: Kim Yŏnggwang

Kim Young-kwang (Korean: 김영광; born 28 June 1983) is a South Korean retired footballer who played as a goalkeeper.

== Club career ==
Kim's club career spanned 21 years.

== International career ==
He was part of the South Korea 2004 Olympic football team, who finished second in Group A, making it through to the next round, before being defeated by silver medal winners Paraguay. He also capped for South Korea U-20 team at 2003 FIFA World Youth Championship. He was part of the Korean squad for the 2006 FIFA World Cup.

== Controversy ==
Kim Young-kwang sparked controversy after engaging in road rage while driving his vehicle. The incident occurred because a taxi traveling straight did not yield to him as he attempted to merge into traffic by turning right. Netizens criticized Kim Young-kwang with comments such as, "Athletes are trash... They should have been discarded once they were done with sports.," and "You brainless idiot who reeks of a rotten sewer."

== Club career statistics ==
As of 10 February 2011

Club performance			League		Cup		League Cup		Continental		Total	
Season	Club	League	Apps	Goals	Apps	Goals	Apps	Goals	Apps	Goals	Apps	Goals
South Korea			League		KFA Cup		League Cup		Continental		Total	
2002	Chunnam Dragons	K League 1	0	0	0	0	0	0	—			
2003	Chunnam Dragons	K League 1	11	0	0	0	—		—		11	0
2004	Chunnam Dragons	K League 1	22	0	1	0	0	0	—		23	0
2005	Chunnam Dragons	K League 1	22	0	3	0	10	0	—		35	0
2006	Chunnam Dragons	K League 1	10	0	4	0	3	0	—		17	0
2007	Ulsan Hyundai	K League 1	26	0	3	0	10	0	—		39	0
2008	Ulsan Hyundai	K League 1	25	0	3	0	8	0	—		36	0
2009	Ulsan Hyundai	K League 1	28	0	1	0	4	0	5	0	38	0
2010	Ulsan Hyundai	K League 1	27	0	1	0	1	0	—		29	0
2011	Ulsan Hyundai	K League 1	28	0	4	0	6	0	—		38	0
2012	Ulsan Hyundai	K League 1	32	0	4	0	-	-	10	0	46	0
2013	Ulsan Hyundai	K League 1	6	0	0	0	-	-	-	-	6	0
2014	Gyeongnam FC	K League 1	33	0	1	0	-	-	-	-	34	0
2015	Seoul E-Land FC	K League 2	38	0	2	0	-	-	-	-	40	0
2016	Seoul E-Land FC	K League 2	39	0	2	0	-	-	-	-	41	0
2017	Seoul E-Land FC	K League 2	36	0	0	0	-	-	-	-	36	0
2018	Seoul E-Land FC	K League 2	36	0	0	0	-	-	-	-	36	0
2019	Seoul E-Land FC	K League 2	34	0	0	0	-	-	-	-	34	0
2020	Seongnam FC	K League 1	23	0	1	0	-	-	-	-	24	0
2021	Seongnam FC	K League 1	38	0	0	0	-	-	-	-	38	0
2022	Seongnam FC	K League 1	32	0	0	0	-	-	-	-	32	0
2023	Seongnam FC	K League 2	17	0	2	0	-	-	-	-	19	0
Total	South Korea		563	0	32	0	42	0	15	0	652	0
Career total			533	0	32	0	42	0	15	0	652	0

== International clean sheets ==
Results list South Korea's goal tally first.

#	Date	Venue	Opponent	Result	Competition
1	14 February 2004	Ulsan, South Korea	Oman	5–0	Friendly match
2	20 March 2005	Dubai, UAE	Burkina Faso	1–0	Friendly match
3	1 June 2006	Oslo, Norway	Norway	0–0	Friendly match
4	16 August 2006	Taipei, Chinese Taipei	Chinese Taipei	3–0	2007 AFC Asian Cup qualification
5	5 September 2008	Seoul, South Korea	Jordan	1–0	Friendly match
6	11 October 2008	Suwon, South Korea	Uzbekistan	3–0	Friendly match

Korea Republic national team
Year	Apps	Goals
2004	3	0
2005	2	0
2006	6	0
2007	0	0
2008	2	0
2009	1	0
2010	0	0
2011	0	0
2012	3	0
Total	17	0

== Honours ==
Ulsan Hyundai

- AFC Champions League (1): 2012
