= Trashed =

Trashed may refer to:

- Trashed (album), an album by the punk rock group Lagwagon
- "Trashed" (Black Sabbath song), 1983
- "Trashed" (Skin song), 2003
- Trashed (game show), an American television series
- Trashed (film), a 2012 film
- Trashed (comic book), a 2015 comic by Derf Backderf

== See also ==
- Trash (disambiguation)
