= George Allen (footballer, born 1928) =

Australian rules footballer

Personal information
- Full name: George Arthur Allen
- Born: 20 April 1928
- Died: 20 October 1995 (aged 67)
- Original team: Port Melbourne (VFL)
- Height: 175 cm (5 ft 9 in)
- Weight: 72 kg (159 lb)

Playing career^{1}
Years	Club	Games (Goals)
1946–1948	South Melbourne	16 (11)
- ^{1} Playing statistics correct to the end of 1948.

George Arthur Allen (20 April 1928 – 20 October 1995) was an Australian rules footballer who played for the South Melbourne Football Club in the Victorian Football League (VFL).
