= Trash Doves =

Internet meme from 2016

Trash Doves is an Internet meme which originated from a sticker set designed in 2016, which feature a large-eyed purple pigeon in various situations. The most notable sticker of the set is an animated GIF of the bird vigorously thrashing its head up and down. Shortly after its debut on Facebook in January 2017, the purple dove sticker set quickly became a viral subject of edited parodies and image macros on social media.

In August 2019, creator Syd Weiler published an article recounting the experience, noting that the intense period of viral fame included harassment and intellectual property infringement and led to depression. Having taken time to reflect and heal, she released a new set of stickers called "LOVE, TRASH DOVES."

== History ==
=== Origin and release ===
Syd Weiler, a Sarasota, Florida-based artist and Adobe Creative resident, first made her dove sticker set for the iOS App Store in September 2016. Weiler described her visit to Minneapolis as inspiration for the illustrations, stating, "I was sitting by a pond ... and there were just pigeons everywhere, I had never thought about pigeons before. They're funny little birds. They have really shiny, colorful, almost rainbow-y feathers, but then they bob around and waddle and beg for food. They're like doves but they eat trash."

Weiler streamed the entire process of creating the stickers on her Twitch channel. The sticker set's illustrations feature a purple pigeon in various situations. Shortly after her Twitch stream, the stickers were released onto the iOS10 iMessage Sticker store.

In December 2016, Facebook approached Weiler, asking to license the dove artwork for her Messenger app. It officially made its Facebook debut on January 31, 2017, which included the animated sticker of a head banging pigeon. On Facebook, the stickers are used in the same way emojis are used, either through the Messenger app or on a comment section. The stickers are also available on Telegram.

=== Virality and use as a meme ===
On February 7, 2017, a Thai Facebook page posted a video that included a fusion of the headbanging dove from the sticker set, and a dancing cat. The video garnered over 3.5 million views in just a few days. Weiler responded to the video stating, "I thought it was really funny. At that point, there's not much I can do about it but laugh." In Thailand, the usage of the meme was described by Sarasota's local media as "a sort of cultural joke". The Thai newspaper Khao Sod also noted that the Thai word for "bird", "nok", is also used to describe someone who is "hopelessly single or suffering from unrequited love", adding to its humor. Over the following weekend, the headbanging bird began to spread to English-language users, who spammed Facebook comment sections with the sticker.

The meme found its way outside of Facebook, being used on other social media websites such as YouTube, in addition to the online comment sections of news outlets such as the New York Times. Some Internet users have created Trash Dove fan art, as well as reworked the image of the head banging dove into other memes, such as Salt Bae.

Similarly to Pepe the Frog, some users of the imageboard 4chan began to propose that the purple dove become a symbol of the alt-right, producing images of the dove combined with Nazi iconography, and interpreting it as a reincarnation of the Egyptian god Thoth dubbed "Pek" (a pun of the Egyptian god Kek, who was associated with Pepe). It was noted that "Like a lot of things on 4chan, it's hard to tell if this whole thing is satirical. The most likely case is that, like the white supremacist tendencies on the site, it started out as a joke but eventually turned real. Posters on liberal Facebook groups are alarmed by the bird spam—most of which is totally innocent, carried out by mainstream Facebook 'normies'—and have decided that any use of the bird is subtle fascist propaganda."

== Reception ==
When the sticker set was propelled to its meme status in February 2017, it was generally met with positive reception. Weiler commented, "The cultural crossover is totally unanticipated, but it's bringing a lot of joy," adding "I'm all about the positive. I created these to make people smile, so whenever I see people sharing Trash Dove I get really excited. I'm glad people can appropriate that." However, Weiler has also expressed, "I'm a quiet homebody – I like to sit at my desk and draw, and play video games. Overnight, I was flooded with attention, and that has only sped up for five days now [...], I'm amazed at how mean people can be to someone they've never met, because of something silly online. I didn't ask for or sign up for any of this, but many people are blaming me, and I've even received some threats."

Kaitlyn Tiffany of The Verge opined that the birds in the sticker set are "cuties". Shortly after the meme rose to popularity, Madison Malone Kircher of New York Magazine detailed, "since it's been about a week since Trash Dove rose to internet fame, the backlash cycle has already begun. People are starting to get irritated by the endless stream of reply comments consisting solely of Trash Doves, and some are even proposing a ban [from Facebook]."
