= Robert Boeser =

American ice hockey player

- Born: June 30, 1927 Minneapolis, MN, USA
- Died: October 29, 1995 (aged 68)
- Position: Centre
- National team: United States
- Playing career: 1947–1958

Robert Raymond Boeser (June 30, 1927 – October 29, 1995) was an American ice hockey player who competed in ice hockey at the 1948 Winter Olympics.

Boeser was a member of the American ice hockey team which played eight games, but was disqualified, at the 1948 Winter Olympics hosted by St. Moritz, Switzerland.
