= List of Marathi films of 1995 =

A list of films produced by the Marathi language film industry based in Maharashtra in the year 1995.

== 1995 Releases ==
A list of Marathi films released in 1995.

Film	Director	Cast	Release Date	Producer	Notes	Source
Doghi	Sumitra Bhave, Sunil Sukthankar	Sadashiv Amrapurkar, Uttara Baokar, Renuka Daftardar		National Film Development Corporation of India		
Aai	Mahesh Manjrekar	Arun Badshandey, Sunil Barve, Subhash Daatar		Ashmi Films		
Bangarwadi	Amol Palekar	Chandrakant Kulkarni, Upendra Limaye, Chandrakant Mandhre		National Film Development Corporation of India	National Film Award for Best Feature Film in Marathi in 1995	
Limited Manuski	Jayoo Patwardhan, Nachiket Patwardhan	Abiv, Pramila Bedekar, Vandana Handa		National Film Development Corporation of India		
Jamla Ho Jamla	Purshottam Berde	Ashok Kumar, Sunil Barve, Laxmikant Berde, Durga Jasraj	March 1995 (India)		The only Marathi film to have Starred legendary actor Ashok Kumar.	
Sukhi Sansarachi 12 Sutre	Anil Baindur	Asawari Joshi, Pradeep Patwardhan, Ashok Saraf				
Zakhmi Kunku	Ramesh Gangane	Alka Kubal, Deepjyoti Naik, Ashok Shinde		Everest Entertainment		
