= Jim Little =

Australian rules footballer

Personal information
- Full name: Jim Little
- Born: 18 April 1938
- Died: 8 October 1995 (aged 57)
- Original team: Tooleybuc
- Height: 191 cm (6 ft 3 in)
- Weight: 87 kg (192 lb)

Playing career^{1}
Years	Club	Games (Goals)
1959	North Melbourne	7 (2)
- ^{1} Playing statistics correct to the end of 1959.

Jim Little (18 April 1938 – 8 October 1995) was an Australian rules footballer who played with North Melbourne in the Victorian Football League (VFL).
