= Jim Morgan (Australian rules footballer) =

Australian rules footballer

Personal information
- Full name: Jim Morgan
- Born: 28 February 1924
- Died: 26 October 1995 (aged 71)
- Original team: Ringwood
- Height: 188 cm (6 ft 2 in)
- Weight: 83 kg (183 lb)

Playing career^{1}
Years	Club	Games (Goals)
1947	Hawthorn	8 (1)
- ^{1} Playing statistics correct to the end of 1947.

Jim Morgan (28 February 1924 – 26 October 1995) was an Australian rules footballer who played with Hawthorn in the Victorian Football League (VFL).
