= Adolf Flubacher =

Swiss footballer

Personal information
- Date of birth: 6 December 1900
- Date of death: 12 October 1995 (aged 94)
- Position: Forward

International career
Years	Team	Apps	(Gls)
1928	Switzerland	2	(0)

Adolf Flubacher (6 December 1900 – 12 October 1995) was a Swiss footballer. He played in two matches for the Switzerland national football team in 1928. He was also part of Switzerland's squad for the football tournament at the 1928 Summer Olympics, but he did not play in any matches.
