= François Brousse =

French philosopher (1913–1995)

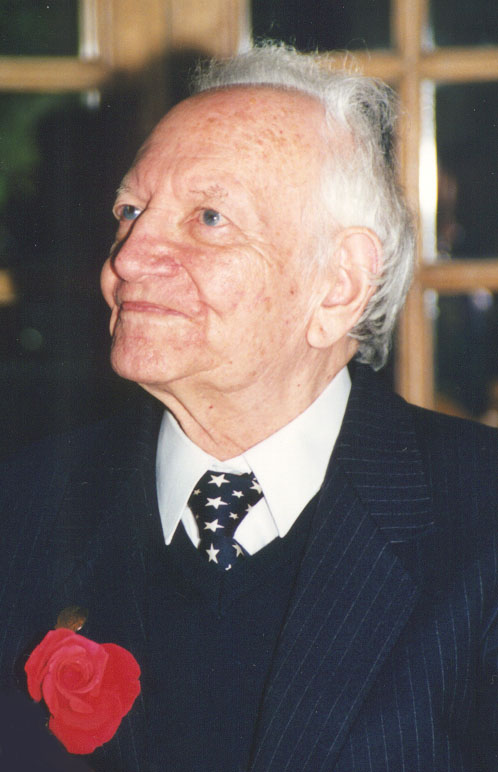
- Photo of François Brousse (1994)
- Born: 7 May 1913; Perpignan, France
- Died: 25 October 1995 (aged 82); Paris, France
- Occupations: Professor of Philosophy; French Writer; Poet; Metaphysician

François Brousse (7 May 1913 – 25 October 1995) was a philosophy professor who had mainly taught in the Languedoc-Roussillon region and is the author of some 80 works including poetry, essays (metaphysical, astronomical, historical and esoteric), novels, plays and storybooks. He was a pioneer of the philosophy cafes that were popping up almost everywhere in France at the end of the 20th century. Brousse was born in Perpignan, France and died in Clamart, France.

== Works ==
In his approximately 40 poetry books, François Brousse embodies the role of a poet. In a radio broadcast (1957), he described this role as being the "gardener of humanity": "Since then, I believe in the civilizing mission poets have. He scatters seeds of beauty, admiration, enthusiasm and love in humanity's collective subconscious. These seeds grow slowly and through them, we can witness a soul's development, the only true type of advancement existing".

In addition to his interest in writing, he was well known in the city of Perpignan for hosting informal meetings in public areas, cafes, herbal stores and special groups, such as the Groupe de la Quatrième Dimension 1950 (The Fourth Dimension Group) and the Association France-Inde 1953. He also contributed to numerous regional magazines such as Madeloc, Sources Vives, Agni, Conflent, Tramontane and so forth.

His knowledge and talent as an orator was visible in conferences that became more frequent after 1963. First held in Prades, then in Perpignan and they finally spread around France, Geneva (Switzerland, 1990) and Tell el-Amarna (Egypt, 1992).

The subjects touched upon in these conferences, which were usually announced in the local press, principally addressed the goal he had given himself in 1945, "One of my earthly missions will be to not only impart the keys to Hugolian esotericism but also the mysteries of Saint John and the secrets of Nostradamus."

Seen as an unclassifiable and colorful character from the city, he described himself as "a quiet man." He explained, "I prefer to meditate rather than meet people and be in crowds. I only want to be read because I have an important message to communicate. […] My mission is to relight the blazing flame of poetry, metaphysics and perfection."

The daily French local papers, L'Indépendant, Midi Libre, La Dépêche du Midi as well as other regional and national news sources dedicated at least two hundred and fifty articles to him whereas periodical journals came out with more than three hundred other sources concerning him in some way or another.

== "1923–1938" Auroral Poetry ==
=== Fantasies (1923–1928) ===
The only child of a French family from Perpignan, François Brousse had a studious and secretive youth. "Already mastering the subtleties of the French language and composing verses, he wrote his first poem 'Soir,’ (Night) 'most likely at the age of ten.'" With extraordinary virtuoso, he also began his first book entitled Fantasies, which he dedicated to his "beloved parents," and finished at the age of fifteen. He had a strong taste for literature, especially poetry with five hundred poems, about three thousand verses, three thousand new ones in prose, and some forty drawings and paintings found within Fantasies.

=== The Tales of the Pigeon and the Source – Jasmine (1927) ===
At the age of fourteen, he wrote The Tales of the Pigeon and the Source, which touched on "love leading to voluntary self-sacrifice in terms of accepting suffering and the death of one’s beloved" It was followed by a swordsman novel, Jasmine that occurred at the time of King Louis XIV and the Revocation of the Edict of Nantes (1685).

=== Auroral or Where my Fairy Lives (1928) ===
To begin to understand what François Brousse saw as "Auroral poetry" (Title of Book VIII), we must first address the poem, "Auroral or Where My Fairy Lives" (date of completion, April 1928). " 'Divine Poetry,’ shows the young poet the works of Ronsard, La Fontaine, Victor Hugo, Leconte de Lisle by a woman with blond hair through air bound travels. The poet asks, "Which of these four beings must I imitate?" The goddess answers, "You will decide for yourself. "

"Art needs to be free,

The infiniteness of all the heavens,

Eternity must vibrate

To its capricious impulses."

The deeper meaning of this long poem (916 verses) is that everything dies but is also reborn, "animals, humans and plants," and even suns: "Yes, the immortal star has been killed! / But the Infinite gives it life again. " There is an idea of permanent creation and perpetual rebirth in a collision of merging worlds. At the end of his life, François Brousse confides in the presence of his friends :

"When I was a child, my father had asked me:

What do you want to create?

I answered him :

Auroral Poetry.

He told me :

That is extremely ambitious. You think the Dawn didn’t exist before your Poetry ?

And I told him that the Dawn is perpetually renewed. He told me I was right and he would help me at the bottom of the abyss after he had entered the infinite, the absolute and the eternal."

=== A Sip of poetry (1928) ===
From all his sources of inspiration and admiration, at a very young age François Brousse finally chose his favorite poet after some hesitation: Victor Hugo. This choice was apparent in the prologue of Une Gorgée de Poésie (A Sip of Poetry) written from May to August 1928. It was an anthology dedicated to Victor Hugo specifying the presence of a seed of poetry within every soul and that "a being without poetry is a being without a soul […] incapable of superhuman feelings."

=== The Poetry of Victor Hugo (c. 1935) ===
In his early writings, François Brousse analyzed the works of Victor Hugo. Brousse reviewed several of Hugo's publications, including Odes et Ballades (Odes and Ballads), Les quatre Vents de l’Esprit (The Four Winds of the Spirit), Le Pape (The Pope), La Pitié suprême (Supreme Mercy), Religions et Religion (Religions and Religion), L’Âne (The Donkey), Toute la Lyre (The Whole Lyre), Dernière Gerbe (Last Gleanings) but he said that the most well written are Les Contemplations (Contemplations), La Légende des siècles (The Legend of the Ages), La Fin de Satan (The End of Satan) and Dieu (God).

Brousse's early notebooks contain personal reflections on his goals as a writer. One specific entry uses a story about a statue to describe his commitment to protecting the reputation of great artists:

"When Death places her skeleton hand upon her eyelids, the grateful country makes her grandiose funerals and builds her a statue made of bronze and gold. But a few envious mosquitoes, filled with venom, come and circle around the statue, harassing the giant dreaming under the luminous sky with their miniature stingers. A child passed by. He was an adolescent filled with joy and pride from the glory of Titan, his ancestor. He saw the hideous crowd jeering in the face of the powerful statue. With an indignant and serene gesture, he drove away the revolting whirlwind and kneeled before the great statue, which had been insulted. I will be this child."

In this passage, the "child" represents Brousse's belief that a new generation of poets must defend the work of those who came before them. He argued that society needs poets to provide inspiration, later stating that "a people without poets are an earth without a sky."

=== The Gods (1930–1932) – The Giants (1932–1938) ===
During his last two years at the Collège de Perpignan (Perpignan Middle School) (1930–1932), François Brousse finished a collection of thirty-five poems entitled Les Dieux (The Gods) and started a series of sonnets on Les Colosses (The Giants), presented here by Jean-Pierre Wenger in his biography, François Brousse l’Enlumineur des mondes (François Brousse, The Enlightener of Worlds :

This anthology builds upon a source of inspiration already begun at an earlier time with mythology – mainly Greek – and with Egyptian, Cambodian, Biblical and Hindu traditions. These sonnets bathe their strophes in these unearthly dimensions where humanity’s universal saga is expressed. The reader is transported into the domain of pure ideas made so real that he or she forgets everything else. He simultaneously began "Les Colosses" with the geniuses who civilized humanity: Homer, Aeschylus and Virgil whose enormous physical builds had a distinct influence on the people. It is made up of fifty-seven sonnets. No conquerors are present. Although antique Greece was the author’s preference, he nevertheless did not neglect the Biblical saga with Isaiah and Ezekiel, to which he would subsequently dedicate his studies. Also amongst Les Colosses are some Latin heroes like Tacitus, Juvenal and Virgil who were already ranked in Victor Hugo’s Hall of Humanity in "La Préface de Cromwell" (Cromwell’s Preface) .

=== Julien (1935) – Ganelon (c. 1935) ===
At the Montpellier College of Arts and Languages, where he had registered in 1932, Brousse embarked upon writing two epics: Julien (750 verses, finished 14 April 1935) which recounts a few events in the life of the Roman emperor, Flavius Claudius Julianus (331–363), also known under the name, Julian the Apostate; and most likely Ganelon (2060 verses) about the legendary Song of Roland and Ganelon's betrayal. Roland died in an apotheosis-like destiny while giving his blood "to save the universe" in order to keep the flame of Wisdom and Freedom lighted.

=== The Lotus Queen – The Awakenings of Lazare (1936) ===
"In March 1936 (or November 1937), Brousse started working for the French National Education System first as a Boarding School Supervisor, then as part of the adjunct faculty and from 1940, taught philosophy and literature in the Languedoc-Roussillon region until he retired in 1975. He also brought exposure to the science of cosmography (1955, 1962)."

In March 1936, Hitler broke the Locarno Pact and reoccupied the Rhineland areas, which has been demilitarized. François Brousse foretold of great upheaval to come in "La Reine du lotus, "(The Lotus Queen) which he classified amongst the major poems of his book: "A Tower is rising, "the Triumphant Babel," with powerful walls whose blocks are "kneaded with bones." We can see one of the "Tours de la Nuit" (Night Towers). This work is a study foretelling the collapse of dictatorships., a crystallization of bleak dogmatisms crushing human aspirations towards perfection. It is the totalitarian dream and will of power obliterating love."

In addition, on 10 August 1936, François finished "Les Réveils de Lazare", a prophetic study based on some of Victor Hugo's writings [Les Châtiments (Castigations) and La Légende des siècles (The Legend of Ages)], under the alias "Charles Amazan." Here, he touches on the unification of Austria and Germany, the tragic end of Mussolini, the final fall of Nazism, the breakdown of Anglo-Saxon colonialism and the future democratic nature of the United States and Europe.

== "1938" - Meeting Cajzoran Ali ==
After five years studying at the University of Montpellier for a teaching degree in Language and Philosophy, he started working for the French National Education System. In 1938, life events led him to meet Cajzoran Ali, a thirty-five-year-old North-American woman who had published a book about Yoga in New York ten years earlier entitled Divine Posture Influence upon Endocrine Glands.

François Brousse recounts this unusual meeting in Béziers and Montpellier in his book Isis-Uranie. It marked a decisive moment in his life due to the significance of the knowledge he gained, amongst which were unknown Upanishads, the vast panorama in which current humanity – the Fifth Race – resides in a line of evolution soaring through past and future millenniums.

Another revelation from the Yogini to the young poet was the Tarot of India and Egypt, a collection of twenty-four figurines or archetypes representing the twenty-four principle cycles, planets, religions, philosophies, methods and eternal masters in world history. "Poetic inspiration, dreams, madness and also fantasy, folklore, mythology and religion are reflections of these universal archetypes that we find in all peoples and that seem to have sprung up miraculously in perfect harmony, order and parallelism […].

== "1938"- The Earth Poem ==
The Poème de la Terre (Earth Poem) – 35 sonnets dedicated to the living Earth – was the first book published by François Brousse. This was a brilliant breakthrough into 20th century literature for the inspired poet. The work is epic in its Homerian strength, reminiscent of exploding comets and spewing lava, and recounts the chaotic steps of the Universe’s Origins, the birth of the Earth and its amazing separation. On rock-hard marble, he etched opinions, which he would hold throughout his life about the ultimate purpose of life with sonnets like, "Les réincarnations," (Reincarnations) "Les génies," (The Geniuses) and "L’idée de Dieu" (The Idea of God). The author himself comments about "Reincarnations": "Such a sonnet holds doctrines discovered by sages from all religions and is the pure diamond of Truth. The transmigration of souls, the law of Karma, which spans the universes and finally the infinite progress of an indestructible being in a limitless life...". "

What more is there to say about Le Poème de la Terre? I hear the echoing voice of Antoine Orliac who just yesterday, talking to me and placing a hand on François Brousse’s shoulder said, "Finally, here is a true poet! (Albert Janicot, magazine Madeloc, no. 37, Perpignan, October 1955)

== "1939–1949" - Historical studies ==
Leaning on Victor Hugo’s texts, in May 1939 he published "Les Tours de la nuit" (The Night Towers) in the magazine Astrosophie. Here, he announced the fall of the fascist dictatorships and did so four months before France and England went to war against Hitler.

Between 1947 and 1948, a series of articles entitled "Le secret des tombes royales" (The Secret of the Royal Graves) appeared in the magazine Destins (Paris). They related to France's history and discussed the 1,000 and 300 year cycles François Brousse spoke about, which had stuck a chord with the French, European and international public from the second half of the 20th century and the beginning of the 21st century, its critical period being the ± 4 years around 2015.

In 1949, he finished another historical study called, "La Prophétie des papes, miroir du monde" (The Prophecy of Popes, the Mirror of the World).

== "1942" - Lamennais and Universal Christianity ==
Lamennais et le christianisme universel (Lamennais and Universal Christianity) (Ed. Le Scorpion, Paris, 1963). This philosophical essay corresponds to François Brousse's memory on Raison individuelle et Raison générale chez Lamennais (Lamennais' Individual and Popular Reason). In May 1942 he successfully finished his studies started many years earlier in Montpellier and obtained the Diplôme d’Études Supérieures de Philosophie et Lettres (Master's degree in Philosophy and Language).

Brousse reveals the strengths, weaknesses, and this remarkable genius' duality of life and thought. He clearly reproduced the meaning and value of the ideal that set the genius alight. This book contains numerous ideas and it reflects the author's interest in the subject.

== "1952"- Fourth Dimension Poetry ==
In the 17 July 1952 newspaper edition of Sud-Ouest (Bordeaux, France), an article by R. Cahisa called, "À l’inconscient surréaliste substituant le surconscient, François Brousse, philosophe et conteur, fonde le groupe de la Quatrième Dimension. (Surrealist unconsciousness substituting for super-consciousness, François Brousse, philosopher and storyteller, founds the Forth Dimension Group). Brousse is portrayed as a person who is, "svelte and thin with strong prescription glasses. This kind, patient and optimistic vegetarian who believes in homeopathy, the afterlife, metempsychosis and who admires Hindu philosophy and Gandhi – who let himself die of hunger – could be said to have his head in the clouds or even on trans-Plutonian planets."

The thinker had detailed views on surrealism and science :

"[...] Einstein spent time in the Forth Dimension. A mistake, says Brousse. The Forth Dimension is a supernatural world radiating beyond time, space and the material world. In order to reach this supernatural world, true inner discipline is necessary. All thoughts of hate must be eliminated, enthusiasm and a sense of aestheticism must be cultivated, dreams must be analyzed and metaphysical thought must be stimulated."

"Rejecting drugs and their associated disorders, despair and degeneration, as a writer, Brousse only reveals this famous Forth Dimension to investigation by scientific experts to then make it available to all by placing it in the domain of inspiration.

Three keys are necessary to open the doors to the sanctuary of this supernatural world, guiding us to the Forth Dimension: purification, meditation and contemplation.

Purifying the body, soul and spirit, particularly through vegetarianism, nonviolence and practicing Buddhist blessings of wishing happiness to all beings in every direction – North, South, East, West, the nadir, zenith and within our primordial being. François Brousse’s stance was, "We must be completely vegetarian. If we cannot do so, we will never know the ultimate Truth. This is an absolute truth that I am telling you here…"

Meditating on the great sacred textures, humanity's heritage.

Contemplating artistic masterpieces from Rembrandt, Michelangelo, Mozart, Hugo and others, thus immersing ourselves in universal Beauty and spiritual escape.

The remainder of the article primarily addresses the soul. "Humans reincarnate on a planet until they attain supreme Wisdom. At that time, they move beyond the wheel of reincarnation and enter into eternal Joy. [...] This is the destiny of all souls after more or less transformation."

He gives this Group a Fourth Dimension Manifesto. A number of poems edited between 1950 and 1970 thereby drew their inspiration, amongst which were Les Pèlerins de la nuit (The Night Pilgrims) that won the "Grand Prix d’Honneur aux Jeux floraux du Genêt d’Or" (a literary prize) in Perpignan.

== "1966–1989" - The God of philosophers ==
In his books like his discourse, Brousse's metaphysics branch out from philosophical deism dear to Voltaire, which states :

"The universe encumbers me and I cannot imagine

This clock existing with no clockmaker."

It admits to an existing Principle of consciousness, the infinite, eternity, the absolute, the source of the Being and the Merit where "for lack of a greater name, we say God". It clarifies the human journey by affirming the existence of an immortal soul that incarnates from body to body under the sovereign law of Karma until it is able to identify with the entire cosmos in a process of Wisdom, Love, Power, Joy and Beauty.

"To bloom, to wither, and flower again

Is the destiny of Eve’s children.

Their crowd passes like a dream

It is the burning spark of sapphires"

It follows the idea that eternal hell does not exist but is rather, the invention of religion and all beings are called, chosen and will ultimately be saved. Should human beings eternally be punished in the name of a cruel God for a short-lived mistake? François Brousse's God is not like the Religious Gods but the philosopher's Gods that follow reason and wisdom. He thus reaffirms the great idea of Justice or Karma advocated by the Hindus and Ancient Greek philosophers, always holding the possibility of being transformed at any point in time. The God of philosophers is an impeccably just god, "But the most beautiful sapphire of his immense richness / Is to hold the infiniteness of Clemency."

According to Brousse, three forces govern the universe: Freedom, Fatality and Providence." Human beings reap what they sow. It is up to the individual to follow the paths of grace by intelligently using free will. "Providence is God’s smile when he looks upon humankind and shows the paths to a glorious life."

For François Brousse, suffering is therefore not the law of the world but, alas, a sometimes necessary form of purification. "Pain teaches us and thought transforms us." To help this slow journey of souls towards Happiness, Magicians shape human history and form what Brousse calls Aggartha.

"To push towards the threshold of an ineffable world,

Human pilgrims walking slowly,

Archangels use their grandiose energy

Carrying nations upon their adorable wings."

After a period of rigorous analysis started in his youth, his thoughts revealed the illusion of time, space and cause, which was synthesized in "L’illusion de l’illusion" (The Illusion of Illusion). His idealistic outlook joins Berkeley's, not seeing any reality in tangible, sensitive matter. François Brousse also came to this conclusion and for him, matter was only an insubstantial appearance; only the human spirit could give him a reality.

== "1989–1995" The transfinite Poet ==
From 1985 to 1990 a new style of poetry arrived and was called "Transfinite," a word already used by the German mathematician, Georg Cantor (1845–1918). For the poet, "the Transfinite is the union of the finite and infinite in a transcendent synthesis : Its domain is Illumination." Poetry is a path, a type of ascension to the most ideal metamorphosis for night pilgrims and a true initiatory path that transforms a person enamored with beauty into transcendent exaltation.

"I rise amongst the stars

The hurricane blows in my sailed canvas

I enjoy fatal destinations."

This period was exceptionally fertile with poetic inspiration, which combines ethereal expression, purified until transparency and symbolic lucidity in areas where human experience draws silent.

His poetic creativity increased vertiginously and for good reason while writing on average two to three poems a day and more than 400 pages of text in a few months: La Rosée des constellations (Dew of the Constellations) (1991), Les Transfigurations (Transfigurations) (1992), Le Baiser de l’archange (The Kiss of the Archangel) (1993), Le Frisson de l’aurore (The Shiver of Dawn) (1993), Les Miroitements de l’Infini (The Shimmering Infinite) (1994), L’Homme aux semelles de tempête (The Man with Wandering Feet) (1995), Rencontre avec l’Être (Meeting with the Being) (1995); and the post-mortem publications with La Roseraie des fauvettes (The Warbler's Rose Garden) (1997), L’Idéale Métamorphose (The Ideal Metamorphosis) (1998), Le Sourire de l’Astre (The Star's Smile) (1998), Le Refrain de l’Absolu (The Chorus of the Absolute) (2000).

In Le Pas des songes (Following Dreams) (2001) is a collection of about two hundred of François Brousse's final poems amongst more than five thousand others written between the ages of 10 and 83.

DOVES

Doves, oh white doves,

Fluttering on the tombs,

Come drink from the pavement crevasses

A sidereal light.

The dead are not in the night,

They are rising to the dazzling heavens

And are traveling from awakening to awakening

Until the unfathomable sun.

They watch as all flee

Like the waters' foam

And savor, blessed lovers,

The embraces of the transfinite.

One of the last poems he wrote in his life brought much concern about the future of humanity and his extreme lucidity tinged with hope and remaining open to all possibilities :

"There is not much more time

To restore humankind

But this illustrious mission

Crosses all our paths."

(September 24, 1995)

== Public Events and Activities from or about François Brousse ==
=== Conferences given by François Brousse (1951–1995) ===
Brousse's conferences began in the autumn of 1951 (magazine Madeloc, No. 14, November 1951, Perpignan) and concerned astronomy. They became more frequent during his sojourn in Prades (1961–1965) when opening a series on the Apocalypse (1961–1981), a theme about which he had aimed to disseminate new knowledge after 1945 [(L’Avenir des peuples) (The Future of the People)]. They particularly inspired the publication of Commentaires sur l’Apocalypse de saint Jean, t.1 (Commentaries on Saint John's Apocalypse) vol. 1 [Ed. La Licorne Ailée (The Winged Unicorn), Clamart, 2001].

From 1975 he dedicated a few conferences (1976–1978 in Prades and Perpignan) to his encounters with beings having left a mark on his life: Zorah – ou Cajzoran Ali – (Zorah or Cajzoran Ali) (1938), le Comte de Saint-Germain (The Tale of Saint-Germain) (1966), Apollonius de Tyane (The Apollonius of Tyana) (1927). He studied other historical figures who he classified amongst the prophets of humanity like Rama, Jesus, Plotin, Ulrich of Mayence, etc.

Prophesy, a phenomenon that fascinated Brousse from 1934 after discovering Nostradamus, is widely approached by bringing in archetypes from the "Tarot" (1972), la Grande Pyramide (The Great Pyramid) (1977), books like Asia Mysteriosa (1976), lore such as the prophecies from Roi du Monde (The King of the World) (1978), secret societies like l’Ordre Polaire (The Order of the Polar Star) (1976) and the Esséniens (Essenes) (1977).

In 1979 and 1980, Brousse greatly speaks about Philippe of Lyon [L’Évangile de Philippe de Lyon (Philippe of Lyon's Gospel), Ed. La Licorne Ailée, 1994], Nostradamus, and the great prophecies (three lectures on La Prophétie des Papes (The Prophecy of the Popes), Padre Pio, etc.) and in June 1979, he gave his first lecture in Paris on "La communication des sens et de l’esprit," (Communication of the Senses and the Spirit).

From 1980 he published and publicly talked about his journeys to Wesak every year during the month of May. From 1982 to 1984, he focused on the Proverbs of Solomon (more than eighteen lectures in Prades) in front of an audience captivated by his psychological finesse. He would present regularly in Paris but was also solicited in other cities in France such as Nîmes, Agde, Toulouse, Poitiers, Montpellier and Strasbourg.

His lectures (1984–1990) touching on "astrosophy" (wisdom of the stars), a word formerly used by F. Root-Wheler (1929) but to which François Brousse attributed deep importance as cycles or cosmic eras through which souls travel [L'astrosophie ou la science divine des étoiles, (Astrosophy or the Divine Science of the Stars) Ed. Dervy-Livres, Paris, 1989].

In 1985, his preferred subject was Initiation and a century necessity, Victor Hugo. In 1986–1987 it changed to Halley's comet, Egypt (four conferences), the Fourth Dimension, the Age of Aquarius and also seven conferences on religion. Brousse also dedicated numerous topics to the Occident's great initiates (1986–1989): Pythagoras, Plato, Rosenkreutz, Paracelsus, Hugo and more while reserving a special place for Akhenaton after 1976 (at least seven lectures).

After his last lecture in Perpignan in October 1990, he held his thoughts from the Parisian public until his final appearance at "Le Manifeste de la Quatrième Dimension" (The Fourth Dimension Manifesto) in June 1995. From these numerous talks and lectures, a collection of 430 titles remains.

=== François Brousse and France-Inde (1952–1963) ===
THE FRANCE-INDE MAGAZINE

The magazine France-Inde was first published in February 1951 by an association with the same name, which was created in 1948 in Pierrefitte (around Paris) and chaired by Gopaljee Samboo. This magazine was distributed from February 1951 (No. 1) to 1975 (No. 100), quarterly or biannually and was sponsored by an Honor Committee with J.-P. Sartre, Sanghor, and G. Duhamel amongst others (1954). The Oriental scholar, Jean Herbert, wrote a few articles on Hindu spirituality for the magazine.

About ten poems, just as many articles and roughly fifteen summaries of François Brousse's work appeared in France-Inde.

THE FRANCE-INDE COMMITTEE IN PERPIGNAN

"The mission of the France-Inde association is to develop cultural relations between two great nations and the beautiful province of Roussillon will be one of the first to partake in the resurgence of Indianism."

In June 1952, Brousse and C. Van Dyck created the France-Inde Committee in Perpignan, linked to the national France-Inde Association. From 1953 to 1963 nine public conferences were organized in this framework with lecturers such as Lanza del Vasto (16 November 1955) – the heir to Gandhi and Vinoba – and the French Catalan hatha-yogi from Banyuls, Lucien Ferrer."

The France-Inde Committee of Perpignan released its first publication, Agni, in 1953 (magazine Agni, Perpignan, No. 1-24, 1953–1960).

"Charles Amazan, Georges Zaclaz and Suryananda – the many pseudonyms of Brousse – were in this publication along with poems, metaphysical texts and essays on great minds like Jesus, Rama, Hugo, Pythagoras, Ganesha and Thalès de Milet. A few articles or reports appeared in the French papers "L’Indépendant" and "Midi Libre" recounting public conferences organized by France-Inde of Perpignan. This mainly quarterly magazine flourished for seven years, until its twenty-fourth publication."

=== François Brousse, the Poet with a hundred Faces (1954) ===
In 1954, under the title, François Brousse le poète aux cent visages [(François Brousse, the Poet with a Hundred Faces) (Ed. Labau, Perpignan)], René Espeut, for whom "Brousse's poetry continually streams into the vapors of transcendent esoterism" published the first study dedicated to Brousse's poetic works.

A broadcast discussion, entitled François Brousse, l'Alchimiste du Rêve (François Brousse, the Alchemist of Dreams), dedicated to the poet's last book accompanied the study exalting the complete works of Brousse (J. D., magazine Tramontane, Perpignan, No. 370, July–August 1954).

=== Hommage to Brousse (1960) ===
On 25 October 1960 Claude Van Dyck honored the poet in Perpignan at the "Maison du Prisonnier" with a conference called "Sous le signe de la Poésie, de la Science et de la Philosophie, François Brousse, astronome, poète et métaphysicien" (Through Poetry, Science and Philosophy, François Brousse, the Astronomer, Poet and Metaphysician). The third part of this conference was published in the magazine, Sources Vives (Perpignan, No. 18, Winter 1961).

Claude Van Dyck, a friend of François Brousse since 1951, gave four other similar conferences in homage to François Brousse. The last to date was in Paris on 25 May 1982, and was called "Le génie de François Brousse, sous le triple signe de l’Astronomie, de la Poésie, de la Philosophie" (The genius of François Brousse through the tree disciplines of Poetry, Science and Philosophy) with Arthur Conte (who became the representative of the Oriental Pyrenees) giving the introduction and closing. A. Conte, a historian and novelist who saw François Brousse as "passionate about the great mysteries of thought, inspiration, illumination and the universe," awarded him the "plume d’or" (The Golden Pen Award).

=== The Awakening of Individualism (May 1968) ===
In May 1968, François Brousse as philosophy professor wrote a jarring article that came out in L’Indépendant (Perpignan) on 1 June 1968 and was called "Le Réveil de l’Individualisme" (The Awakening of Individualism). In this composition, he rejected all idols and fiercely defended the right and necessity to be free and happy :

"The rise of this earthquake is due to the awakening of the buried giant: individualism. For half a century, we have heard the totalitarian creeds scolding the people, making obedience the ultimate virtue of the nation. 'Lower your head, slave, and you will be happy. Eat your fare, follow the Government's rules, worship idols and forget your dignity as a free individual!’ The youth responded "No" to this demeaning actuality [...].

Respect for practical people must replace the adoration of bloodthirsty, abstract idols rising from capitalism, Marxism, religion and concepts of God or the Devil! Evidently, freedom designed in this manner becomes the unbreakable axis of evolution. A great purifying wind will carry economic or professional feudal systems away. I am particularly thinking of the "Ordre National des Médecins" (French Medical Association), which is a remnant of the Nazi occupation and dictates over all medical practitioners, preventing them from freely healing their patients and restricts rapidly expanding independent research. [...] Neither science nor realism is enough to make people happy. We were aiming for well-being but lacked joy and lost our freedom."

The Ordre des Médecins with Georges Baillat, the President of its Departmental Counsel, did not delay in publishing their response in the 6 June 1968 edition of L’Indépendant (Perpignan).

=== François Brousse on Radio Waves (1981–1989) ===
François Brousse's name was first transmitted on 19 May 1953, when René Espeut delivered a radio conference, "François Brousse l’alchimiste du rêve," from the antennas of "Radiodiffusion Nationale" (the French National Radio) mainly drawing from Brousse's book, Les Pèlerins de la nuit (The Night Pilgrims) (René Espeut, François Brousse le poète aux cent visages, Ed. Labau, Perpignan, 1954).

In the beginning of January 1979, Brousse participated in the broadcast aired daily by France-Inter "Tout finit par être vrai, une émission qui sort de l’ordinaire," (Everything turns out to be true, a show stepping out of the ordinary) hosted by Henri Gougaud and Jacques Pradel (newspaper L’Indépendant, Perpignan, 8 January 1979).

From 1983, Brousse more frequently appeared on radio interviews, mainly on local channels like "Radio Force 7" and "Radio Cap de la Hève" (Le Havre, 1983), "Radio Midi Soleil" (Perpignan, 1983), "Radio Évasion" (Paris, 1985) and "Radio Bonheur" (Paris, 1986) to whom he spoke during the Salon des Médecines Douces (Alternative Medicine Exposition) and claimed, "the greatest remedy for all illness is poetry."

In 1987, along with Martine Roussard, who directed the weekly radio show, "Conseil en numérologie," (Numerology Advice), Brousse was invited to do an interview by "Radio Bonheur" in January. Later in June, he was asked to come back to answer questions from the listeners about a show on the "Mysteries of the Caribbean."

In 1988 Brousse also appeared on the radio station, "Ici et Maintenant" (93,6 MHz) for live interviews on subjects such as religion, freedom and the immortality of the soul. He later came back for the December 1989 show "Science et conscience" where he drew from the philosophies of Pythagoras, Plato, Plotinus etc. Finally, the last burst of François Brousse's poetry was presented on this radio station from March 1990 to November 1990 with "Chants dans l'azur" (Songs in the Blue Sky) for twenty minutes every month.

=== Public Homage to Brousse, the Roussillon poet (1982–2005) ===
At 9 PM on 12 January 1982, the Municipal Theater of Perpignan was showing a play inspired by one of Brousse's poetic works, "Nourished by the secret of the Being's Dimensions and Mysteries". Eleven aspiring actors rehearsed for four months under Josy Llop from the Dramatic Arts Conservatory of Perpignan. "The play did not go unnoticed and was covered by six articles in L’Indépendant and three in Midi Libre" "The city of Perpignan knew how to honor a poet and a thinker".

During a commemoration honoring the ten years after the Roussillon poet died, on 25 October 2005 (at the Centro Espagnol, Perpignan, 9 PM) Josy Llop embarked on a new play, "Le Livre des Secrets" (The Book of Secrets) with eight students from the CNR (the National Conservatory of the Region). The students who were from Perpignan, brilliantly interpreted the thoughts and poems of François Brousse and were accompanied by the soft and calming guitar of Francisco Ortiz.

=== The Press Perpignan (1981–1995) ===
Serious historical research done by Jean-Pierre Wenger in libraries around France (La Bibliothèque Nationale de France à Paris (The National Library of France in Paris), la Bibliothèque municipale de Perpignan (The Municipal Library of Perpignan), les Archives départementales des Pyrénées Orientales (The Departmental Archives of the Pyrenees), les Archives nationals (The National Archives), etc.) ensured the contributions of an author like François Brousse would never be forgotten from the literary stage of the 20th century :

36 magazines were thus able to release about 320 articles concerning him in some manner and 14 newspapers spoke about him in some 240 articles. Other factors to take into consideration are the eighty books published by the author to this day, a substantial amount of unedited manuscripts, not counting the 400 conferences given around France throughout his life and many other recordings. This all exemplifies the prolific dimensions of this inexhaustible character.

Its proof is when, in 1986 the press in Perpignan became especially interested in François Brousse and consecrated at least four consistent articles with evocative titles :

o "François Brousse, un sage de bonne compagnie" (François Brousse, a Friendly Sage) (Jacques Queralt, L’Indépendant, Perpignan, 19 August 1986)

o "L’étoile filante de l’ésotérisme" (The Shooting Star of Esoterism) (Unnamed author, Midi Libre, Perpignan, 31 October 1986)

o "François Brousse l’anarchiste-idéaliste" (François Brousse, the Anarchist-Idealist (Midi Libre, Perpignan, 9 November 1986)

o "François Brousse, philosophe et visionnaire" (François Brousse, Philosopher and Visionary) (Midi Libre, Perpignan, 25 December 1986)

"Must we still introduce François Brousse? […] Endowed with a phenomenal memory and level of knowledge, Brousse furthermore separates himself from traditional clairvoyance by this fundamental difference: No consultation office, no speculations about the future. François Brousse goes about like Greek philosophers from many centuries ago. Always surrounded by a loyal entourage, he preaches, makes statements and answers questions. Amongst the privileged meeting areas are cafes, tearooms and reception halls in the largest hotels in Perpignan. But his most certain and consistent meeting point called "le Cénacle" is located on the ground floor of 8, rue de la Lanterne in Perpignan. In this place, parables are decrypted from the Bible and books by Hugo, considered by the master as the greatest visionary of the modern era." (magazine Midi Libre, Perpignan, 25 December 1986)

Other articles were found and presented during the Exposition François Brousse, la presse et son œuvre (François Brousse, the Press and his Work) at the Perpignan multimedia library (December 2006 – January 2007) amongst which were :

o "Le philosophe sur la terrasse" (Philosopher on the Terrace) (magazine L’Indépendant, Perpignan, 26 August 1981)

o "François Brousse un philosophe prolifique" (François Brousse, a Bountiful Philosopher) (magazine L’Indépendant, Perpignan, 22 April 1992)

o "La philosophie dans la rue" (Street Philosophy) (magazine L’Indépendant, Perpignan, 7 November 1990)

o "François Brousse n’est plus" (François Brousse is No Longer) (magazine L’Indépendant, Perpignan, 2 November 1995)

How could an individual such as François Brousse, so well known and acknowledged in Perpignan, slip through the holed net of the national press during the internationalization of the media? The documentary François Brousse un sage de bonne compagnie (François Brousse, the Friendly Sage) attempts to give elements of these answers. Far from fame, calculated smiles and handshakes, he would not rest until his entourage had understood his only wish was to be read. May be he believed after all in "La force du livre" (The Power of Books)? Uninterested by himself, François Brousse dedicated his book to Perfection and Universal Life. He tried "to use the last years of his life to awaken individual consciousness."

== Innovative facets of François Brousse's thought ==
=== Studies on astronomy ===
In 1940 In La Cosmogonie des Pa Koua (The Cosmogony of Pakuas), Liou Tse Houa pictures the existence of a planet called "Proserpine" about 6 billion miles from the Sun, beyond Pluto. In May 1948, François Brousse wrote an article in the magazine Destins (Paris, No. 27) called "Pluton et les planètes transplutoniennes" (Pluto and the Transplutonian Planets) in which he suggests the existence of four transplutonian planets : Proserpine, Minerva, Juno and Vesta. This hypothesis is based on the law of Camille Flammarion : "All periodic comets have their aphelion neighboring the orbit of a planet." [Flammarion C., Astronomie Populaire (Popular Astronomy), Book IV, Ch. IX].

The above astronomical discoveries made these two seekers partially correct because a celestial body filed under the name "2003 UB 313" or "Xena" was discovered in 2005 by the American Michael Brown from negatives dating from 2003 (Jean-François Augereau, "Le système solaire s'enrichit de trois nouvelles planetes, (The Solar System Finds Three New Planets)" newspaper Le Monde, Paris, August 18, 2006).

In 1955, four subsequent articles by Brousse appeared in L’Indépendant (Perpignan): "L’astronomie des origines à nos jours," (Original Astronomy in our Times) a wide fresco of astronomical discoveries and "À la recherche de mondes nouveaux"(Seeking New Worlds) where he developed his own hypotheses.

Furthermore, Brousse was not indifferent to news of UFOs that the press diffused between 1952 and 1954. More than fifteen articles on the subject appeared in the newspaper L’Indépendant. "Non identified flying objects, as the Americans say, furrowed our atmosphere before the noses of officials. This significant event shook up the people." (Brousse, "Soucoupes volantes à travers les âges", (Flying Saucers Throughout the Ages) newspaper Midi Libre, Perpignan, January 4, 1955). In his article, he considers life on Mars as plausible : "Is there life on Mars? Why not ?" (Newspaper L’Indépendant Perpignan, November 30, 1954). The possibility of life on another planet in the Solar System is approached in La Lune fille et mère de la Terre (The Moon, Daughter and Mother of the Earth with advanced explanations to understand the mysterious lunar relief (magazine Sources Vives, Perpignan, No. 5, April 1958).

In 1958, still following the law of Flammarion, Brousse enlarged the planetary family with two "trônes de ténèbres" (seats of darkness), Bacchus and Hercules, respectively 33.9 and 79.5 billion miles from the Sun (magazine Agni, Perpignan, No. 18, Winter 1958). With flourishing growth, in 1960, he suggested the existence of a new planet named "Flora" 18.6 billion miles from the Sun in his book De Pythagore à Camille Flammarion (From Pythagoras to Camille Flammarion) (magazine Sources Vives, Perpignan, No. 14, Winter 1960). The text builds on his previous writings and follows a hypothesis developed in 1952 by the Italian seismologist Bendandi.

Still mentally agile at the end of his life, he enlarged the Solar System to 24 planets whose distances and revolutions are specified in La Trinosophie de l’Étoile polaire (The Polar Star Trinosophia) (Ed. La Licorne Ailée, Clamart, 1990, pp. 29–30). He took into account links to nuclear magic numbers and the 24 arcana of the Tarot.

=== Pythagorean Revelations / Scientific Lucidity ===
If there is one book by François Brousse that should be read, it is Une Torche aux astres allumée (A Torch Lighted by the Stars). Through its pertinent revelations, it is about the life and the mysteries of Pythagoras.

From the first lines in the first chapter we learn that Pythagoras had the "invaluable honor" of revealing "the idea of the transmigration of souls, the key to the world." We also learn that this was a "fundamental truth" to the Hellenes people and to "Empedocles, Aeschylus, Plato, Virgil, Ovid, Porphyry and Lamblichus, who all drank deeply from this eternal source of truth. The sage Pherecydes, a visionary philosopher, was his master; he went in search of the Truth in Egypt where he experienced the "midnight sun and the face of Hermes"; he met Ezekiel in Chaldea, a titanic effusion of these "two poles of the world"; that he explored "the secret sanctuaries of India" where he "met the true sages who were perfected men"; and that finally, "he wanted to visit the sages of the Occident, the Druids with golden scythes" holding "the sayings of Ogmios."

We also learn that Pythagoras incarnated as Aetalide, the son of Mercury and guider of souls, Euphorbus a Trojan hero, Hermotimus of Clazomenae, and Pyrrhus, a fisherman from Delos, fascinated by this "sacred island".

In Une Torche aux astres allumée, François Brousse questions the fundamentals of science at that time : The impossibility of a particle to go as fast and even less likely, to go faster than the speed of light. Yet, this impassable threshold was obliterated in 1996 : "Modern physics holds the speed of light as an insurmountable barrier. A German laboratory has nevertheless succeeded in making a particle travel 4.7 times faster than the speed of light."

After having anticipated this stage, François Brousse mentions the following step in the same book : "Once having passed the wall of light, Time and Matter change dimensions. Time, after having reached the zero point, reverses its trajectory and goes back into the past. It enters into a collection of negative numbers. It leaves the future and quiets in destruction. Antimatter is precisely matter in a reversed time line." His perspicuous idea furthermore proposes an audacious string of changes: "Matter transforms into energy, energy into desire, desire into thought and thought into eternity."

=== Parallel Worlds ===
In addition to reincarnation and metempsychosis, coexists the concept of parallel lives : In the depths of immensity, there are "Earths" with different rotation speeds in the billions of solar systems similar to our own and inhabited with populations similar to us. On these parallel Earths and amongst these peoples are different forms of Me. They are different and yet connected to my multiple being, living their parallel lives. I have a much desired job that is not manifested in your world; I live in the country of my choice, I marry another companion, I meet the famous painters who I admire, I partake in unthinkable expeditions, I have access to long disappeared books and so on. By doing so, every wish that is born manifests in one of these parallel worlds at that very moment.

There are at least two purposes of parallel lives tied, according to François Brousse, to the number 777. Firstly, multiple lives on multiple dimensions help eliminate any frustration when we manage to feel it deeply by satisfying our desires in other dimensions. Is this a cheep consolation? "Why would you want it to be expensive?" replies François Brousse.

By considering life in dimension rather than in length, "past lives" are no longer successive but simultaneous. In a planet rotating slower than our own, this parallel life occurs in what we consider our past. Likewise, if the speed of the parallel planet's rotation is faster than ours, then this parallel life is considered as our future. Someone with a sharp mind could thus explain premonitory dreams and signs as communication from this so-called "future" world to our so-called "present" world.

Parallel worlds are a way to access the fourth dimension and push our "Here and Now" consciousness to consider "Everywhere and Forever." It considers the soul to be One and Many and can be compared to a totem pole with 777 juxtaposed faces or better yet, a building with 777 stories, each level occupied by 777 "Me’s". "Reality is narrow and possibility is immense," Alphonse de Lamartine would say. François Brousse responded, "I am not something real and isolated but all possibilities realized."

=== Victor Hugo, the unrecognized Prophet ===
From the age of fifteen, François Brousse admired Victor Hugo to whom he dedicated the opuscule La Poésie de Victor Hugo (Victor Hugo's Poetry). After, he discovered the greatness of Victor Hugo who foresaw the First World War particularly with two noteworthy phrases : "Verdun, premier rempart de la France alarmée" (Verdun, the first ramparts of an alarmed France); "Enseignons à nos fils à creuser des tranchées" (Teach our sons to dig in the trenches).

His in-depth research of Hugo's book allowed him to publish the article, "Les Tours de la nuit" (Night Tours) in the May 1939 edition of the magazine Astrosophie. In this article, he announces the fall of the fascist dictators. It was easy for him to recognize the führer Adolf Hitler: "[…] A man with the eyes of a wolf, nothing to him but his mustache […] " in the capturing snapshots Victor Hugo gives in "La Vision de Dante" within La Légende des siècles (The Legend of Ages), where a monstrous despot is described in vivid images.

To complete this historical background, in Les Châtiments, the diatribe entitled "Ad Majoram Dei Gloriam" appeared and the threefold Pétainiste slogan "Work, Family, Patrimony" joined with: "Priests, we will write upon a brilliant flag/ Order, Religion, Property, Family."

In his essay Les Secrets kabbalistiques de Victor Hugo, which pertinently touches on the poet's intimate notes, François Brousse describes Victor Hugo as a "Prodigious character, a centaur of the infinite, Janus of the incredible world, a siren in the ocean of skies and a tetramorph sphinx lying on the brink of chasms. This unfathomable master appears as such, where all rivers of inspiration cross with the turmoil of glory and rapture."

=== Cycles and Prophecies ===
The cyclical nature of events regulates human life, people, humanities and the cosmos. This cycle connects with the idea of successive lives through which humans fully attain their ultimate ideal in the domains of Wisdom, Love and Beauty and when accomplished, marks the end of their return to Earth.

The cycles regulate the atom's vortex and the massive take-off of galaxies. [...] History, like all subject areas, follows the law of rhythm. Man breathes. Humanity, which is a Big Man, also breathes. To know the breaths of History is to hold the keys of the future. This is the sign of true prophets from Daniel to Hugo and Nostradamus. [François Brousse, Nostradamus ressuscité (Nostradamus Resuscitated), vol. 2, Ed. La Licorne Ailée, Clamart, p. 62]

François Brousse came into the arena of prophesy in May 1939 with the article "Les tours de la nuit" in the magazine Astrosophie (Nice, No. 5). This article was the result of his enthusiastic reflections on prophetic texts by Hugo describing the second world conflict, its outcome and the fall of Fascism.

In 1940–1945, his constant focus on Nostradamus led to the discovery of historical cycles that not only confirm his previous conclusions but also specify the year of the war's ending in 1945.

Using the pseudonym Charles Amazan, François Brousse put the great prophecy and hope of Victor Hugo into his own words in 1945 concerning the building of Europe, which he supported [L’Avenir des peuples (The Future of Humanity), Perpignan].

Still concerning the subject of cycles his article, "Le secret des tombes royales," appeared in the magazine Destins (Paris, No. 16-27, May 1947 – May 1948). It explains humanity's future throughout the history of the kings of France with a very critical period around 2015.

Are cycles a force from which we cannot be released ? The answer depends :

A man who is alone is free; he can confront the strength of the stars. But a nation, race or group is always enslaved and endures the whims of the heavens. Free will can scarcely delay fatal catastrophes by a few years. Nevertheless, a lucid government driven by sincere pacifism can circumvent the fire. In this case, the passionate warrior agonizes in colonial rule rather than setting the world aflame. (François Brousse, magazine Destins, Paris, No. 14, March 1947).

In 1949, he wrote La Prophétie des papes (The Prophesy of Popes), which would remain unpublished for about thirty years until 1981. In his eyes, the reduced number of popes in the future would confirm the next end of humanity. In 1965, he came out with Les Clés de Nostradamus (The Keys of Nostradamus) (magazine Sources Vives, No. 32, Perpignan) in which he announced the departure of General Charles de Gaulle in 1969, four years beforehand.

His fascination with prophesies drove him to examine a large number of dark texts like the prophesies of Brother Johannes, Saint Odile (1940), Isaïe (1967), Plaisance (1967), Saint Kosmas de l’Étolie, Padre Pio (Conference in Perpignan, 1979), the secret of Fatima (1977, 1980), etc., of which some commentaries appear in La septième Erreur de l’humanité (The Seventh Error of Humanity) (Ed. La Licorne Ailée, Clamart, 1991).

At the beginning of the 1980s, he added numerology to the concept of cycles by using the "theosophical sum" of an ordinary year to obtain an original prophetic method. Thus during the winter of every year he had the pleasure of creating prophesies for the coming year. These were sometimes published in the newspaper Midi Libre (Perpignan: 30 December 1985, 27 December 1986 and 4 February 1987), in the magazine L’Inconnu (Paris, No. 117, February 1986) and others.

François Brousse forcefully protested the ambient pessimism foreshadowing a world war for 1983–1984 (magazine L’Inconnu, Paris, 1980 – magazine Paris-Match, Paris, 1982). He also opposed erroneous interpretations of Nostradamus [("Le Pape sera-t-il assassiné à Lyon ?" (Will the Pope be assassinated in Lyon?) in Le Monde inconnu, Paris, No. 75, Sept]. 1986). Finally, he surprisingly announced the year of his own death twenty-three years before its arrival.

=== Yearly Celebration of Wesak ===
In 1981–1995, François Brousse published accounts of experiences he had had during the spiritual Buddhist celebrations of Wesak in the month of May marking the three main events of Buddha's life (birth, awakening and death).

In addition to the twenty-four wise men – held in humanity's collective memory of civilization and who work under the arm of Sanat Kumara not from the physical but spiritual and astral dimensions of the Himalayas – all those who are able to travel there in spirit are present. Amida Bouddha – one of the stars of the Buddhist Pantheon – also manifests to deliver a universal message.

=== Amalekite Astrology ===
Taking into consideration the precession of the equinoxes, François Brousse recommended a new type of astrology called "Amalekite astrology" in which the Sun of two signs retrogrades. It is further described in Dan Languillier's book, Alpheratz le Navire des étoiles (Alpheratz, the Star Navigator).

=== The Tree of Life and Eternity ===
"The Kabala, a science of universal analogies, the golden and steel links between letters, numbers, ideas, constellations, planets, colors, sounds, flavors, smells, touch, and geometric shapes unfurls a forest of pillars both colossal and magic like a Hindu temple. […] If Hebrew is magnificent, Sanskrit is superhuman, Greek is sublime, Latin is divine and French receives the reflection of the Sun of suns in the wonderful lake of its linguistic essence."

From then on François Brousse developed a type of French gematria where every letter corresponds to a number. According to the normal scale set by custom and taken from the depth of cosmic thought: A = 1; B = 2, etc. "To obtain the number of a word, we must add all the letters to reach the secret sum or the occult murmur. At this point we can see a correspondence with twenty-two major arcana of the Tarot, a book with wondrous pages."

=== Polar Yoga ===
During special circumstances in 1938, 1953 and 1966 François Brousse channeled a collection of methods linking meditations, breathing techniques and visualizations. He brought them together in Le Yoga polaire (The Polar Yoga) in which he explains unsuspected powers. "Through all of these methods, we can, and I repeat, go beyond the entire wheel of our incarnations in one life and soar towards attaining immortality, which burns all our karma and takes us up to the infinite glory of the divine dimension. We must discover our-Self within ourselves"

== Literary works ==
François Brousse's literary work can be found in the Bibliothèque nationale de France (the National Library of France in Paris) and all of his books are available from La Licorne Ailée association.

Editions de la Licorne Ailée was founded in 1982 to promote and distribute the work of François Brousse. Older versions of his work before 1982 were generally reedited by Éditions de la Licorne Ailée and if not mentioned otherwise, this edition house also edited works after 1982.

=== POETRY ===
Older works were compiled and reedited in Œuvres poétiques t. I (Poetic Works vol. 1) in 1986:

Le Poème de la Terre (Earth Poem) (1938)

La Tour de cristal (The Cristal Tower) (1939)

Chants dans le ciel (Cries in the Sky) (1940)

À l’Ombre de l’Antéchrist – Poèmes écrits sous l’occupation allemande (At the Shadow before Christ – Poems written under German Occupation) (1945)

Le Rythme d’or (The Golden Rhythm) (1951)

Les Pèlerins de la nuit (The Night Pilgrims) (1953)

L’Enlumineur des mondes (The Enlightener of Worlds) (1954)

La Harpe aux cordes de Lune (The Harp with Moonlight Chords) (1957)

L’éternel Reflet (Eternal Reflection) (1963)

Hymne à la Joie (Hymn to Joy)(1964)

Works from 1970 to 1975 compiled and reedited in Œuvres poétiques t. II (Poetic Works vol. 2) in 1988 :

Voltiges et vertiges – Sonnets psychédéliques (Flutters and Vertigo) (1970)

De l’autre Cygne à l’Un (From the Other Swan to One) (1973)

Murmures magiques (Magical Murmurs) (1975)

Rama aux yeux de lotus bleu (Rama with Lotus Blue Eyes) (1952; 1983)

L’Angélus des rêves (The Angelus of dreams) (1978; 1989)

Ivresses et sommeils (Drunkenness and Sleep) (1980; 1989)

Au Royaume des oiseaux et des licornes (The Kingdom of Birds and Unicorns) (1982)

Orphée au front serein (Serene Orpheus) (1984)

L’Aigle blanc d’Altaïr (The White Eagle of Altaïr) (1987)

Le Graal d’or aux mille soleils (The Golden Grail of a Thousand Suns) (1989)

La Rosée des constellations (Dew of the Constellations) (1991)

Les Transfigurations (Transfigurations) (1992)

Le Baiser de l’Archange (The Kiss of the Archangel) (1993)

Le Frisson de l’aurore (The Shiver of Dawn) (1993)

Les Miroitements de l’Infini (The Shimmering Infinite) (1994)

Le Chant cosmique de Merlin (Merlin's Cosmic Song) (1995)

L’Homme aux semelles de tempête (The Man with Wandering Feet) (1995)

Poèmes de mon lointain matin (Poems of my faraway morning) (1995)

Rencontre avec l’Être (Meeting with the Being) (1995)

La Roseraie des fauvettes (The Warbler's Rosary) (1997)

L’idéale Métamorphose (The Ideal Metamorphosis) (1998)

Le Sourire de l’astre (The Star's Smile) (1998)

Fantaisies (Fantasies) (2000)

Le Refrain de l’Absolu (The Chorus of the Absolute) (2001)

Le Pas des songes (Following Dreams) (2001)

Vers l’Ailleurs – Anthologie poétique (Towards the Beyond – a Poetic Anthology) (2005)

Les Jardins de la Reine Jeanne (Queen Jeanne's Gardens) (2006)

Le Rire des dieux (The Laughing of the Gods) (2006)

Vie lyrique (Lyric Life) (2006)

La Mort du mahatma Gandhi (The Death of Mahatma Gandhi) (Éditions de la Neuvième Licorne, 2008)

=== ESSAY ===
Unless otherwise mentioned, all the below cited works were published or reedited by Éditions de la Licorne Ailée. The first date gives the first edition and the next date gives the second edition.

La Chute de l’aigle allemand (The Fall of the German Eagle) (Imp. Sinthe et Co., Perpignan, 1944)

L’Avenir des peuples – Étude sur les destinées du monde (The Future of Humanity – Study on the World's Destiny) (Imp. Sinthe et Co., Perpignan, 1945)

Le Secret des tombes royales (The Secret of the Royal Tombs) (1947; 1991)

Ezéchiel, mage chaldéen (Ezechiel, the Chaldean Magician (1955; reedited in Les Secrets kabbalistiques de la Bible in 1987)

La Lune, fille et mère de la Terre (The Moon, Daughter and Mother of the Earth) (1958; 1992)

Antoine Orliac, Poète martiniste (Antoine Orliac, the Martinist Poet) (magazine Sources Vives, No. 8, Perpignan, Nov. 1958)

De Pythagore à Camille Flammarion (From Pythagoras to Camille Flammarion) (1960; 1991)

Une Torche aux astres allumée (A Torch lighted by the stars) (1961; 1989)

Lamennais et le christianisme universel (Lamennais and Universal Christianity) (1963)

Sub Rosa, pensées sans entrave (Sub Rosa, Thoughts with no Limits) (1964)

Les Clés de Nostradamus (The Keys to Nostradamus) [1965; reedited in Nostradamus ressuscité, t. II (Nostradamus resuscitated, vol. 2) in 1997]

Les Secrets kabbalistiques de la Bible (The Kabalistic Secrets of the Bible) (1968; 1987)

Zoroastre, l’Apôtre du Soleil (Zoroaster, the Apostle of the Sun) (1972; 1989)

L’Ordre de l'Étoile polaire et Celui qui vient [(The Order of the Polar Star and the Next to Arrive) 1974; reedited in La Trinosophie de l'Étoile polaire (The Polar Star Trinosophia) in 1990]

Isis-Uranie [(Isis and Urania) 1976; reedited in La Trinosophie de l'Étoile polaire (The Polar Star Trinosophia) in 1990]

Le double Infini [(The double Infinite) (1977; reedited in La Trinosophie de l'Étoile polaire (The Polar Star Trinosophia) in 1990]

René Espeut, biologiste et poète (Rene Espeut, Biologist and Poet) (magazine Sources Vives, No. 34, Perpignan, Winter 1979)

La Prophétie des papes, miroir du monde (The Prophecy of Popes, the Mirror of the World) (1981)

Les Visiteurs des millénaires – Le Comte de Saint-Germain, t. I (Millennium Visitors – The Tale of Saint-Germain vol. 1) (1982; 1990)

La Trinosophie de l'Étoile polaire (The Polar Star Trinosophia) (1984; 1990)

Les Secrets kabbalistiques de Victor Hugo (The Kabalistic Secrets of Victor Hugo) (1985)

Les Secrets kabbalistiques de la Bible (The Kabalistic Secrets of the Bible) (1987)

L’Astrosophie, la science divine des étoiles (Astrophy, the Divine Science of the Stars) (Éditions Dervy-livre, Paris, 1989)

La septième Erreur de l’humanité (The Seventh Error of Humanity) (1991)

L’Arbre de vie et d’éternité, une nouvelle forme de Kabbale (The Tree of Life and Eternity, a New Form of Kabbalism) (1992)

Le Livre des révélations, t. I et II (The Book of Revelations, vol. 1 and 2) (1992)

Les Mystères d’Apollon (The Mysteries of Apollo) (1992)

La Coupe d’Ogmios (Ogmios' Cup) (1993)

L’Évangile de Philippe de Lyon (The Gospels of Philippe de Lyon) (1994)

Par le Soupirail du rêve (Through the Cellar Window of Dreams) (1996)

Nostradamus ressuscité [(Nostradamus Resuscitated) book I (vol. 1) (1996), book II (vol. 2) (1997), book III (vol. 3) (1998)]

Le Yoga polaire (The Polar Yoga) (1997)

Dans la Lumière ésotérique (In Esoteric Light) (1999)

Commentaires sur l’Apocalypse de saint Jean, t. I (Commentaries on Saint John's Apocalypse) (2001)

Bulletin du Maître polaire – Cours de Métaphysique (A Polar Master's Guide, a Metaphysical Course) – 1992–1993 (éd. 2001); 1993–1994 (éd. 2002); 1994–1995 (éd. 2003); 1995–1996 (éd. 2004); 1996–1997 (éd. 2005); 1997–1998 (éd. 2006); 1998–1999 (éd. 2007); 1999–2000 (éd. 2008)

Le Manifeste de la Quatrième Dimension (The Fourth Dimension Manifesto) (Éditions de la Neuvième Licorne, 2008)

Poésie, langage de l'âme (Poetry, Language of the Soul) (Éditions de la Neuvième Licorne, 2008)

=== NOVELS ===
Péhadrita parmi les étoiles (Pehadrita in the stars) (1983)

L’Abeille de Misraïm (Misraim's Bee) (1986)

Contes du gouffre et de l’infini (Tales of Chasms and the Infinite) (1988)

== Cultural Aspects ==
=== Biography ===
François Brousse l’Enlumineur des mondes (François Brousse, The Enlightener of Worlds) by Jean-Pierre Wenger, Ed. Danicel productions, Saint-Cloud, 2005. This biography required over five years of research and made it possible to communicate the worth of this author's contribution to twentieth century literature.

=== The poetry of François Brousse on stage (1982–2009) ===
Conservatoire National de Région de Perpignan (National Conservatory of the Perpignan Region)

o Montage poétique (Poetic Assembly) (1982): 1 interpretation in Perpignan – Staging by Josy Llop-Borrelli

o Le Livre des secrets (The Book of Secrets) (2005–2006): 2 interpretations in Perpignan – Staging by Josy Llop-Borrelli

Production of La Licorne Ailée (92 140, Clamart)

o Histoire d’une âme (History of a Soul) (1985–1988): 7 interpretations in Paris, Boulogne-sur-Mer and Perpignan

o Le Chant intérieur (The Inner Song) (1987): 1 interpretation in Paris

o Devant l’Éternité du Nil (Before the Eternity of the Nile) (1988–1998): 7 interpretations in Paris, Minieh-Égypte, Druyes-sur-Yonne and Montpellier

o Les Maîtres de l’âme (Masters of the Soul) (1989) : 1 interpretation in Paris

o Rama aux yeux de lotus bleu (Rama with the Lotus Blue Eyes) (1993–1996): 4 interpretations in Paris and surrounding areas

o Mahatma Gandhi (Mahatma Gandhi) (2008–2009): 2 interpretations in Perpignan and Castelnau-le-Lez – Staging by Jean-Jacques Charrière

Production of La Compagnie Artistique Soleil (38 000, Grenoble)

o Cœur d’une âme (The Heart of a Soul) (1988) : 1 interpretation in Perpignan

o Voyage à travers le temps et les arts (Journey through time and art) (1988) : 2 interpretations in Grenoble

o Poèmes et danses sacrés du ciel et de la Terre (Poems and Sacred Dances of the Sky and Earth) (1990) : 1 interpretation in Perpignan

o Akh-en-Aton, pharaon soleil (Akh-en-Aton, the Sun Pharaoh) (1991–1994) : 4 interpretations in Grenoble and Montpellier

Production of La Compagnie de l’Étoile (75 014, Paris)

o La Vénus de Milo (Milo's Venus) (1997–2005) : 17 interpretations in Paris, Villefranche-sur-Saône, Montpellier and Avignon (Festival OFF 1997) – Staging by Jean-Jacques Charrière

o Le Poème de la Terre (Earth Poem) (1999–2000) : 14 interpretations in Paris, Montpellier and Avignon (Festival OFF 1999) – Staging by Jean-Jacques Charrière

o Les Pages de l’amour (The Pages of Love) (1999–2000): 4 interpretations in Paris, Montpellier and Lyon) – Staging by Zahia Lebtahi

o Regard d’ange (The Look of an Angel) (2000–2001) : 11 interpretations in Paris – Staging by Thierry Devaye

o Le Chant cosmique de Merlin (Merlin's Cosmic Song) (2005) : 1 interpretation in Paris

o La Mésaventure de Méphistophélès (Mephistophele's Misfortune) (2006–2007) : 21 interpretations in Perpignan and Paris – Staging by Jean-Jacques Charrière

o Gandhi, l’astre des sages (Gandhi, the Star of the Sages) (2007–2008) : 19 interpretations in Paris and Avignon (Festival OFF 2008) – Staging by Elisabeth Martin-Chabot

=== Commemoration of October 2005 ===
The Compagnie de l’Étoile organized a commemoration at the Centro Espagnol of Perpignan on 25 and 26 October 2005, on François Brousse's inspiration at the ten-year anniversary of his death (25 October 1995). This event was covered by the press in Perpignan and commemorated the Roussillonnais philosopher with a documentary François Brousse évoqué par ses amis (François Brousse from the Eyes of his Friends), a François Brousse Exposition, his works and the press, numerous conferences, talks, impromptu poetry and the appearance of a biography, François Brousse l'Enlumineur des Mondes (François Brousse, the Enlightener of Worlds).

=== François Brousse, his Work and the Press ===
François Brousse, son œuvre et la presse (François Brousse, his Work and the Press) (Production of La Compagnie de l’Étoile) was the exposition, which took place at the Médiathèque de Perpignan (Multimedia Library of Perpignan) from Dec. 2006 – Jan. 2007 on this vivid character, "one amongst the 500 others who had significance to the Roussillon region" according to La Semaine du Roussillon (No. 500, Nov. 2005).

=== Filmography ===
François Brousse évoqué par ses amis (François Brousse in the Eyes of his Friends), a 45-minute documentary directed by Thomas Harlay and produced by La Compagnie de l’Étoile, Suresnes, 2005. Its first screening appeared in 2005 at the Centro Espagnol of Perpignan during the ten-year commemoration of François Brousse's death.

François Brousse un sage de bonne compagnie (François Brousse, the Friendly Sage), an 80-minute documentary directed by Thomas Harlay and produced by La Compagnie de l’Étoile, Paris, 2009. First appearance during the Exposition of François Brousse, his work and the press at the Médiathèque de Perpignan in December 2006. The film was finalized in April 2009.

A DVD of François Brousse un sage de bonne compagnie (Made available the fourth quarter of 2009), contains these two films.
