= Alan Lavers =

English cricketer

Personal information
- Full name: Alan Braden Lavers
- Born: 6 September 1912; Melbourne, Australia
- Died: 25 October 1995 (aged 83); Aberdeen, Scotland
- Batting: Right-handed
- Role: Batsman

Domestic team information
- Years: Team
- 1937–1953: Essex

Career statistics
Competition	FC
Matches	26
Runs scored	734
Batting average	17.06
100s/50s	0/0
Top score	42*
Balls bowled	984
Wickets	13
Bowling average	38.23
5 wickets in innings	0
10 wickets in match	0
Best bowling	4/68
Catches/stumpings	6/0
- Source: Cricinfo, 20 July 2013

Alan Lavers (6 September 1912 – 25 October 1995) was an English cricketer. He played for Essex between 1937 and 1953.
