= White Trash =

White trash is an American pejorative term for poor white people, especially in rural areas.

White trash may also refer to:

- White Trash (film), American title of Luis Buñuel's film The Young One (1960)

== Books ==
- White Trash (novel), John King (2002)
- White Trash, a novel by Alexandra Allred (2016)
- White Trash: Moronic Inferno, a comic by Gordon Rennie
- White Trash: The 400-Year Untold History of Class in America, a book by historian Nancy Isenberg

== Music ==
=== Bands ===
- White Trash (Scottish band), a British pop group
- White Trash (American band), an American funk metal band
- Edgar Winter's White Trash, an American R&B band

=== Songs ===
- "White Trash", a 1983 song by the Argentine band Sumo
- "White Trash", a song by Orchestral Manoeuvres in the Dark from their 1984 album Junk Culture
- "White Trash", a 1995 song by Southern Culture on the Skids
- "White Trash", a song on the Junior Senior album D-D-Don't Stop the Beat
- "White Trash", the debut single by New Zealand band Steriogram
- "White Trash", a single released in 2008 by electro-industrial band Funker Vogt
- "White Trash", a Miranda Lambert song on her 2019 album Wildcard_(Miranda_Lambert_album)
- "White Trash (2nd Generation)", a song by Bad Religion from their 1981 album How Could Hell Be Any Worse?

== See also ==
- Poor White Trash, a 2000 film by Michael Addis
- Poor White Trash, alternate release title of the 1957 film Bayou
- White Trash with Money, a 2006 Toby Keith album
- White Trash Cooking, a 1986 cookbook by Ernest Matthew Mickler
- Po' White Trash, a 1900 play by Evelyn Greenleaf Sutherland
