= Allan Jacobsen (Australian footballer) =

Australian rules footballer, born 1916

Personal information
- Full name: Alan Nicholas Jacobsen
- Born: 18 August 1916; Footscray, Victoria
- Died: 10 October 1995 (aged 79)
- Original team: Scotch College
- Height: 188 cm (6 ft 2 in)
- Weight: 87 kg (192 lb)

Playing career^{1}
Years	Club	Games (Goals)
1939, 1945	Footscray	30 (27)
- ^{1} Playing statistics correct to the end of 1945.

Alan Nicholas Jacobsen (18 August 1916 – 10 October 1995) was an Australian rules footballer who played for the Footscray Football Club in the Victorian Football League (VFL).
