= Trash Video =

Finnish film production company

Trash Video is a Finnish independent film production company in Tampere, Hervanta. The company was established in 1995.

Known for their sense of humour, Trash Video produces films in a wide range of genres, including zombie comedy sci-fi / horror films, sitcom parody series, Spaghetti Westerns, post-apocalyptic action, and crime films. Videospace website describes the company as "one of the most renowned Finnish independent movie production teams". Using a lean team and minimal budgets, their films embrace blood, bad language, and violence, with frequent references to Hervanta.

== Individual films ==
- Blood Money (1995)
- Troubled Man (1995)
- Horrors of the cabin (1996)
- Space butchers (1996)
- Tough guys (1996)
- Tough guys 2: Revenge (1997)
- Hervanta Homicide (1998)
- Virpoja (1998)
- The last drunken (1998)
- Hervanta Homicide 2000 (1999)
- Santa Murder (2000)
- Trap (2001)
- Jack and the red cosmos (2001)
- Hervanta fury (2001)
- Skewed Curve (2002)
- Hervanta Man (2003)
- Jack Steel vs. Army (2004)
- Nato Commando (2005)
- Slag Hammer (2009)
- The last battle of Venus (2010)

== Party Jacks series ==
- Celebration Jacks: Tuparit (2000)
- Celebration Jacks: Cousin Boy (2001)
- Celebration Jacks: Snow housewarming (2002)
- Celebration Jacks: Tiger's Eye (2003)
- Celebration Jacks: Juhlakalu (2004)
- Celebration Jacks - Season 1 (2008) (13 episodes)

== Action series ==
- Action Hervanta (1999)
- Warriors of Action for Hervanta (1999)
- Summer of Action (2000)
- Action Armageddon (2001)
- Unknown Action (2002)
- Insane Action (2003)
- Action Interactive (2005)
