= Deaths in May 2004 =

The following is a list of notable deaths in May 2004.

Entries for each day are listed alphabetically by surname. A typical entry lists information in the following sequence:

- Name, age, country of citizenship at birth, subsequent country of citizenship (if applicable), reason for notability, cause of death (if known), and reference.

== May 2004 ==
=== 1 ===
- Ejler Bille, 94, Danish artist.
- Paul Carbutt, 53, English cyclist and Olympian (1976).
- Vladimir Chernyshov, 52, Russian volleyball player and Olympic champion (1976, 1980).
- Shimon Even, 68, Israeli computer science researcher.
- Ram Prakash Gupta, 80, Indian politician.
- Felix Haug, 52, Swiss pop musician (Double), heart attack.
- László Karácson, 85, Hungarian army officer and Olympic modern pentathlete (1948).
- Larkin Kerwin, 79, Canadian physicist.
- Lojze Kovačič, 75, Slovene writer.
- Jean-Jacques Laffont, 57, French economist, cancer.
- John Howland Rowe, 85, American archaeologist and anthropologist.

=== 2 ===
- Moe Burtschy, 82, American Major League Baseball player (Philadelphia/Kansas City Athletics), heart attack.
- Duncan Carse, 91, English explorer and actor.
- Nelson Gidding, 84, American screenwriter, congestive heart failure.
- Paul Guimard, 83, French writer.
- John Hammersley, 84, British mathematician.
- Sahar Helal, 35, Egyptian Olympic synchronized swimmer (1984).
- Allan Lindberg, 85, Swedish Olympic pole vaulter (1948).
- Hyam Maccoby, 80, Jewish-British scholar and dramatist.
- Russ Morrow, 80, American football player (Brooklyn Dodgers).
- Tony Poeta, 71, Canadian professional ice hockey player (Chicago Black Hawks).

=== 3 ===
- Anthony Ainley, 71, British actor (Doctor Who), cancer.
- Andrew Cavendish, 11th Duke of Devonshire, 84, British aristocrat and politician.
- Ken Downing, 86, English racing driver.
- Darrell Johnson, 75, American MLB catcher and manager, cancer.
- Volus Jones, 90, American animator.
- Gilbert Lani Kauhi, 66, American actor and comedian, diabetes.
- James Mace, 52, American historian, professor, and researcher.
- Lygia Pape, 77, Brazilian visual artist, sculptor, and filmmaker.
- Derrick Robins, 89, English cricket player and sports promoter.
- Vladimir Terebilov, 88, Soviet judge and politician.
- Gennady Voronin, 69, Soviet Russian Olympic speed skater (1960).

=== 4 ===
- John Amberg, 75, American football player (New York Giants).
- Coxsone Dodd, 72, Jamaican reggae pioneer, heart attack.
- Tage Frid, 88, Danish woodworker, complications of Alzheimer's disease.
- Hugh Gillin, 78, American actor (Back to the Future Part III).
- Torsten Hägerstrand, 87, Swedish geographer, inventor of time geography.
- Guy Million, 71, French cyclist.
- Boris Petrovsky, 95, Soviet and Russian general surgeon.
- David Reimer, 39, Canadian gender-reassignment victim, suicide by gunshot.
- Erik Smith, 73, German-British music producer.
- Jean-Pierre Vigier, 84, French theoretical physicist.

=== 5 ===
- Thea Beckman, 80, Dutch author of children's books (Crusade in Jeans).
- Georgia Campbell, 77, American baseball player.
- John Cornforth, 66, English architectural historian.
- José Maceda, 87, Filipino composer and ethnomusicologist.
- Kate Mundt, 74, Danish film actress.
- Ritsuko Okazaki, 44, Japanese singer-songwriter and author, sepsis.
- František Sláma, 80, Czech chamber music performer.

=== 6 ===
- Virginia Capers, 78, American actress (Raisin, Lady Sings the Blues, Ferris Bueller's Day Off), Tony winner (1974), pneumonia.
- Joseph Calvitt Clarke Jr., 83, American district judge (United States District Court for the Eastern District of Virginia).
- Pepper Gomez, 77, American professional wrestler and bodybuilder, gastritis.
- Kjell Hallbing, (aka Louis Masterson), 69, Norwegian author of westerns.
- Philip Kapleau, 91, American teacher of Zen Buddhism.
- Barney Kessel, 80, American jazz guitarist and studio musician, brain cancer.
- Thanasis Kingley, 75-76, Greek footballer.
- James A. Krumhansl, 84, American physicist.
- Joe Lafata, 82, American baseball player (New York Giants).
- Charlotte Thiele, 85, German actress.
- Daniel Thompson, 69, American poet.

=== 7 ===
- Nick Berg, 26, American businessman and hostage, beheaded by Abu Musab al-Zarqawi in Iraq.
- Joseph Crespo, 79, French rugby player.
- Douglas John Foskett, 85, British librarian.
- Oliver David Jackson, 84, Australian army officer.
- William J. Knight, 74, American Vietnam War combat pilot, astronaut and politician, leukemia.
- Waldemar Milewicz, 48, Polish war journalist, killed in Iraq.

=== 8 ===
- Kumao Aochi, 89, Japanese Olympic middle-distance runner (1936).
- Lewis Caine, 39, Australian organised crime figure, murdered during the Melbourne gangland killings.
- António Champalimaud, 86, Portuguese banker and industrialist.
- Valentin Ezhov, 83, Soviet and Russian screenwriter and playwright, stroke.
- Quentin Hughes, 84, British architect and army officer.
- Tuts McBride, 87, American baseball player.
- Robert P. Multhauf, 84, American science historian, curator, and author.
- John Peel, 91, British politician, MP for Leicester South East (1957–1974).
- Ronnie Robinson, 53, American basketball player (Memphis Tigers, Utah Stars, Memphis Tams/Sounds).

=== 9 ===
- Laxmi Chhaya, 56, Indian actress, dancer and teacher, cancer.
- Tommy Farrell, 82, American film and television actor.
- Brenda Fassie, 39, South African singer, AIDS-related complications.
- Alan Gewirth, 91, American philosopher and author, cancer.
- Akhmad Kadyrov, 52, Chechen politician, President of Chechnya, land mine explosion.
- Alan King, 76, American comedian and actor, lung cancer.
- Lylian Lecomte-Guyonneau, 82, French Olympic fencer (1952).
- Wayne McLeland, 79, American baseball player (Detroit Tigers).
- Olive Osmond, 79, American matriarch of the Osmond singing family.
- Sido L. Ridolfi, 90, American politician.
- Walter H. Stockmayer, 90, American chemist and university teacher.
- Percy M. Young, 91, British musicologist.

=== 10 ===
- Orvar Bergmark, 73, Swedish football player and manager.
- Knut Brogaard, 69, Norwegian footballer.
- Ray Ferritto, 75, American mobster associated with the Cleveland and Los Angeles crime families.
- Phil Gersh, 92, American talent and literary agent.
- Eric Kierans, 90, Canadian economist and politician.
- Portland Mason, 55, British-American child actress and writer.
- Dale Meinert, 70, American football player (Oklahoma A&M Cowboys, Chicago/St. Louis Cardinals).
- Ershad Sikder, 49, Bangladeshi politician, criminal, and serial killer, executed.
- Ibsen Sørensen, 90, Danish Olympic rower (1936).
- Dennis Wilshaw, 78, English international footballer, heart attack.

=== 11 ===
- Mick Doyle, 63, Irish rugby union player and coach, traffic collision.
- Danny McLennan, 79, Scottish football player and coach.
- Abdul Reza Pahlavi, 79, Iranian royal and member of the Pahlavi dynasty.
- Ku Sang, 84, Korean poet.
- Hans Senger, 78, Austrian Olympic alpine skier (1952).
- Alf Valentine, 74, West Indian cricket player.
- John Whitehead, 55, American R&B artist, shot.
- Giorgos Zongolopoulos, 101, Greek sculptor, painter and architect.

=== 12 ===
- Álvaro Cardoso, 90, Portuguese football player.
- Syd Hoff, 91, American children's author and cartoonist.
- John LaPorta, 84, American jazz clarinetist, composer and educator, stroke.
- Dave Piontek, 69, American professional basketball player (Rochester / Cincinnati Royals, St. Louis Hawks, Chicago Packers).
- John Robson, 54, English footballer, multiple sclerosis (MS).
- Alexander Skutch, 99, American naturalist, writer, and ornithologist.

=== 13 ===
- Kjell Bækkelund, 74, Norwegian classical pianist.
- Magnar Estenstad, 79, Norwegian cross-country skier and Olympic silver medalist (1952).
- Bergfrid Fjose, 89, Norwegian politician.
- Muhammad Nawaz, 79, Pakistani Olympic javelin thrower (1956, 1960).
- Carlo Scarascia-Mugnozza, 84, Italian politician.
- Evon Z. Vogt, 86, American cultural anthropologist.

=== 14 ===
- Rudi Arndt, 77, American politician.
- Rip Coleman, 72, American baseball player (New York Yankees, Kansas City Athletics, Baltimore Orioles).
- Günter Gaus, 74, German journalist and commentator.
- Jesús Gil, 71, Spanish businessman and politician, controversial owner of Atlético Madrid football club, stroke.
- Bill Hoffman, 86, American baseball player (Philadelphia Phillies).
- Jack Holland, 56, Irish journalist, novelist, and poet, cancer.
- Torsten Johansson, 84, Swedish tennis player.
- Anna Lee, 91, British-American actress, pneumonia.
- Lu Leonard, 77, American actress (Annie, Micki & Maude, Jake and the Fatman), heart attack.
- Shaun Sutton, 84, British television executive.

=== 15 ===
- Gloria E. Anzaldúa, 61, American writer, academic and feminist, diabetes.
- Hans Bild, 83, German footballer.
- Jack Bradbury, 89, American animator (Pinocchio, Bambi, Fantasia) and comic book artist, kidney failure.
- Marius Constant, 79, Romanian-French composer and conductor.
- Gill Fox, 88, American political cartoonist, comic book artist, and animator.
- Henrique Frade, 69, Brazilian football player.
- William H. Hinton, 85, American writer, and marxist, author of Fanshen: A Documentary of Revolution in a Chinese Village.
- Narciso Ibáñez Menta, 91, Spanish actor, cardiovascular disease.
- Tatsuya Mihashi, 80, Japanese actor.
- Robert K. Morgan, 85, American US Air Force pilot, former pilot of the Memphis Belle, injuries from a fall.
- Clint Warwick, 63, British bass guitarist (The Moody Blues), hepatitis.

=== 16 ===
- Riccardo Brengola, 87, Italian violinist and professor.
- June Carroll, 87, American lyricist, singer and actress.
- Jim Colclough, 68, American gridiron football player (Boston Patriots).
- Simone Del Duca, 91, French businesswoman and philanthropist.
- Peter Hill-Norton, Baron Hill-Norton, 89, British Royal Navy Admiral of the Fleet.
- Kamala Markandaya, 80, Indian novelist and journalist.
- Marika Rökk, 90, Egyptian-German actress, heart attack.
- Billy Stone, 78, American professional football player (Bradley University, Baltimore Colts, Chicago Bears).
- June Taylor, 86, American television dancer and choreographer.

=== 17 ===
- Marjorie Courtenay-Latimer, 97, South African naturalist and museum official.
- Willem Endstra, 51, Dutch real state businessman, shot.
- Gunnar Graps, 52, Estonian rock singer and percussionist, heart attack.
- Ken Mudford, 81, New Zealand Grand Prix motorcycle road racer.
- Buster Narum, 63, American baseball player (Baltimore Orioles, Washington Senators).
- Jørgen Nash, 84, Danish poet and performance artist.
- Tony Randall, 84, American actor (Pillow Talk, The Odd Couple, Inherit the Wind), Emmy winner (1975), pneumonia.
- James Armstrong Richardson, 82, Canadian member of House of Commons, Minister of Supply and Services, Minister of National Defence.
- Cathy Rosier, 59, French model and actress, aneurysm.
- Heidi Sager, 64, German-born Australian canoeist (1960).
- Ezzedine Salim, 60–61, Iraqi politician, president of the Iraqi Governing Council.
- Georges Wengler, 85, Luxembourgian Olympic gymnast (1948).
- Enrique Zobel, 77, Filipino businessman, pilot, and polo player.

=== 18 ===
- Çetin Alp, 56, Turkish singer, heart attack.
- Arnold Orville Beckman, 104, American inventor, industrialist and philanthropist.
- John Maxwell Cowley, 81, Australian-American physicist and academic.
- Heinrich Isser, 76, Austrian bobsledder and Olympian (1956).
- Edgar Jones, 84, American football player (Chicago Bears, Cleveland Browns).
- Elvin Jones, 76, American jazz drummer, John Coltrane Quartet of the 1960s, heart attack.
- Lincoln Kilpatrick, 72, American actor, lung cancer.
- Hyacinthe Thiandoum, 83, Senegalese Roman Catholic Cardinal, Archbishop of Dakar.

=== 19 ===
- Mary Dresselhuys, 97, Dutch actress and comedian.
- Jack Eckerd, 91, American businessman.
- Haruhiko Kindaichi, 91, Japanese linguist and a scholar of kokugogaku.
- Melvin J. Lasky, 84, American journalist, intellectual and anti-communist.
- Robert David MacDonald, 74, Scottish playwright, translator and theatre director.
- Arnold Moore, 90, American blues artist.
- John Naka, 89, American horticulturist, teacher, author, and master bonsai cultivator.
- E. K. Nayanar, 87, Indian politician, three-time Chief Minister of Kerala, India, heart attack.
- Carl Raddatz, 92, German stage and film actor.
- Elvio Romero, 77, Paraguayan poet.
- Leonid Shcherbakov, 77, Russian triple jumper and Olympic silver medalist (1952, 1956).

=== 20 ===
- Gary Ballman, 63, American gridiron football player.
- Lúcio de Castro, 93, Brazilian Olympic pole vaulter (1932).
- Sophie Charlotte Ducker, 95, German-Australian botanist.
- Stanisław Gronkowski, 82, Polish actor.
- Len Murray, 81, British trade union leader, pneumonia.
- Claire Wilbur, 70, American actress and Academy Award-winning producer of short films, lung cancer.

=== 21 ===
- Jean-Pierre Blanc, 62, French film director and screenwriter, cancer.
- Proinsias Mac Cana, 77, Academic and Celtic scholar.
- June Cochran, 62, American model and beauty queen.
- Gunnar Dahlen, 86, Norwegian football player and Olympian (1952).
- Rick Henderson, 76, American jazz alto saxophonist and arranger.
- Toshikazu Kase, 101, Japanese civil servant and diplomat, heart attack.
- Steve Trapilo, 39, American football player (Boston College, New Orleans Saints).
- Gene Wood, 78, American television personality and announcer of game shows, lung cancer.

=== 22 ===
- Richard Biggs, 44, American actor (Babylon 5, Days of Our Lives, Strong Medicine), aortic dissection.
- Samuel Curtis Johnson, Jr., 76, American businessman, fourth generation president of SC Johnson company.
- Zinovy Korogodsky, 77, Russian theater director and academic.
- Peter Masak, 46, Canadian-American engineer and glider pilot, creator of the Masak Scimitar, glider crash.
- Boris Pavlov, 57, Soviet Russian weightlifter and Olympian (1972).
- Alexandr Savko, 37, Belarusian wrestler and Olympian (1996), heart attack.
- Juhani Vellamo, 92, Finnish weightlifter and Olympian (1948, 1952).
- Mikhail Voronin, 59, Russian gymnast, double Olympic champion (1968, 1972), cancer.

=== 23 ===
- Adele Leigh, 75, English operatic soprano, heart attack.
- Ramon Margalef, 85, Spanish biologist and ecologist.
- Trudy Marshall, 84, American actress, lung cancer.
- Harry Preston, 72, Canadian Olympic field hockey player (1964).
- Maxime Rodinson, 89, French historian, sociologist and orientalist.

=== 24 ===
- Scoop Gillespie, 42, American football player (Pittsburgh Steelers).
- Ya'akov Grundman, 64, Polish-Israeli football player and manager, cancer.
- Prentice Marshall, 77, American district judge, bladder cancer.
- Henry Ries, 86, American photographer, known for his photos of the 1948 Berlin Air Lift.
- Milton Shulman, 90, Canadian author, film and theatre critic.
- Edward Wagenknecht, 104, American literary critic and teacher.
- Lee Won-woo, 45, South Korean basketball player and Olympian (1988).

=== 25 ===
- Nikolai Chernykh, 72, Soviet and Russian astronomer.
- David Dellinger, 88, American antiwar activist, member of Chicago Eight.
- Antonia Ivanova, 74, Bulgarian grandmaster chess player.
- Nicholas Luard, 66, British writer and politician.
- Robert P. Sharp, 92, American geomorphologist and expert on the geology of Earth and Mars.
- Roger Williams Straus, Jr., 87, American publisher (Farrar, Straus and Giroux).
- Brooke Wilberger, 19, American student.

=== 26 ===
- Robert Chapman, 81, New Zealand political scientist and historian.
- Gino de Pellegrín, 77, Argentine Olympic alpine skier (1948, 1952).
- Rewata Dhamma, 74, Burmese Theravada Buddhist monk and scholar.
- Sir Donald Cameron of Lochiel, 93, Scottish landowner and a financier.
- Ignacio Mendoza, 95, Mexican Olympic sports shooter (1960).
- Viktor Pilchin, 64, Soviet Russian Olympic sailor (1960, 1964, 1968).

=== 27 ===
- Umberto Agnelli, 69, Italian industrialist, head of Fiat, lymphoma.
- Denis ApIvor, 88, British composer.
- Patience Cleveland, 73, American actress (Donnie Darko, Psycho III, General Hospital), cancer.
- René Grün, 71, Luxembourgian Olympic boxer (1960).
- Ladislav Hecht, 94, Czechoslovak tennis player.
- Jack Losch, 69, American football player (Green Bay Packers).
- Alfonso Marina, 73, American soccer player and Olympian (1956).
- Jim Marshall, 63, British Labour MP, heart attack.
- Mikhail Postnikov, 76, Soviet mathematician, known for his work in algebraic and differential topology.
- Sigrid Lorenzen Rupp, 61, German-American architect, stomach cancer.
- Ronald Smith, 82, British classical pianist and teacher.
- Werner Tübke, 74, German painter.

=== 28 ===
- Michael Alison, 77, British Privy Council member, minister and MP.
- Theo Allenbach, 79, Swiss Olympic skier (1948).
- Gerald Anthony, 52, American actor (One Life to Live, Another World, Wiseguy), suicide.
- Thore Börjesson, 79, Swedish Olympic rower (1952).
- Vittore Branca, 90, Italian philologist, literary critic, and academic.
- Harvey Brooks, 88, American physicist.
- Francis Brunn, 81, German juggler.
- Josie Carey, 73, American lyricist, host of children's show "Children's Corner".
- Jean-Philippe Charbonnier, 82, French photographer.
- Robert Kennedy, 88, British Olympic high jumer (1936).
- Jerzy Klempel, 51, Polish Olympic handball player (1976, 1980), and coach.
- Irene Manning, 91, American actress and singer (Yankee Doodle Dandy), heart failure.
- Catherine Dean May, 90, American politician, member of the United States House of Representatives (1959-1971).

=== 29 ===
- Lawrence Rosario Abavana, 84, Ghanaian politician and teacher.
- Anjuman Ara Begum, 62, Bangladeshi vocalist, pneumonia.
- Sven Borrman, 70, Swedish Olympic weightlifter (1960).
- Barry Brown, 42, Jamaican reggae singer, head trauma following fall.
- Zebedy Colt, 74, American actor, musician, and adult film director.
- Archibald Cox, 92, American lawyer, Watergate special prosecutor.
- Samuel Dash, 79, American lawyer, chief counsel to the House Judiciary Committee during the Watergate scandal, heart failure.
- Magne Havnå, 40, Norwegian professional boxer and Olympian (1984), boating accident.
- Jack Rosenthal, 72, British television dramatist, multiple myeloma.
- Forrest Tucker, 83, American career criminal.
- Ivica Šerfezi, 68, Croatian pop singer, stomach cancer.

=== 30 ===
- Fenner Albert Chace, 95, American carcinologist.
- Raymond M. Clausen, Jr., 56, American marine, Medal of Honour recipient, liver failure.
- Alfred Coppel, 82, American author.
- Gérard de Sède, 82, French author.
- Ross Kite, 73, Australian rugby league footballer.
- Rafał Kurmański, 21, Polish speedway rider, suicide by hanging.
- Jose Paala Salazar, 67, Filipino Roman Catholic prelate.
- Nizamuddin Shamzai, 51, Pakistani Sunni Islamic scholar, assassinated.
- Ed Stanczak, 82, American basketball player (Anderson Packers, Boston Celtics).
- Klavdiya Tochonova, 82, Soviet Olympic shot putter (1952).

=== 31 ===
- Lionel Abrahams, 76, South African novelist, poet, critic, and publisher.
- Dunstan Anderson, 33, American football player (Atlanta Falcons, Miami Dolphins).
- Pierre Duval, 71, French-Canadian operatic tenor.
- Gunnar Hansen, 87, Norwegian Olympic boxer (1948).
- Stanislav Otáhal, 90, Czech Olympic middle-distance runner (1936).
- Artimus Parker, 52, American professional football player (Philadelphia Eagles, New York Jets).
- Robert Quine, 61, American punk rock guitarist, suicide by heroin overdose.
- Étienne Roda-Gil, 62, French songwriter, screenwriter and anarchist, stroke.
