= Athletics at the 1934 British Empire Games – Men's 880 yards =

Men's 880 yards at the Commonwealth Games

The men's 880 yards event at the 1934 British Empire Games was held on 5 and 6 August at the White City Stadium in London, England.

== Medalists ==
Gold	Silver	Bronze
Phil Edwards; British Guiana	Willie Botha; South Africa	Hamish Stothard; Scotland

== Results ==
=== Heats ===
Qualification: First 2 in each heat (Q) qualify directly for the final.

Rank	Heat	Name	Nationality	Time	Notes
1	1	Phil Edwards	British Guiana	1:58.4	Q
2	1	Jack Cooper	England	1:58.8e	Q, +3 yd
3	1	Jim Alford	Wales	?:??.?	
4	1	Wilton Lander	Australia	?:??.?	
?	1	Don Williams	Bermuda	?:??.?	
	1	Ray Lewis	Canada	DNS	
1	2	John Powell	England	1:56.2	Q
2	2	Willie Botha	South Africa	?:??.?	Q, +2 yd
3	2	Les Wade	Canada	?:??.?	
4	2	Michael Gutteridge	England	?:??.?	
5	2	Robert Graham	Scotland	?:??.?	
6	2	G. Crispin	Southern Rhodesia	?:??.?	
1	3	Hamish Stothard	Scotland	1:56.0	Q
2	3	Jerry Sampson	Canada	1:57.0e	Q, +8 yd
3	3	Clifford Whitehead	England	?:??.?	
4	3	Geoff Broadway	New Zealand	?:??.?	
	3	John Addison	Canada	DNS	

=== Final ===
Rank	Name	Nationality	Time	Notes
1st place, gold medalist(s)	Phil Edwards	British Guiana	1:54.2	
2nd place, silver medalist(s)	Willie Botha	South Africa	1:55.5e	+8 yd
3rd place, bronze medalist(s)	Hamish Stothard	Scotland	1:55.6e	+1 yd
4	John Powell	England	?:??.?	
5	Jerry Sampson	Canada	?:??.?	
6	Jack Cooper	England	?:??.?	
