= Harry Williamson (athlete) =

American middle-distance runner (1913–2000)

Personal information
- Full name: Harry Webb Williamson
- Born: July 11, 1913 High Point, North Carolina, U.S.
- Died: April 8, 2000 (aged 86) Charlotte, North Carolina, U.S.
- Education: University of North Carolina at Chapel Hill
- Spouse: Mildred Beasley
- Children: 1

Harry Webb Williamson (July 11, 1913 – April 8, 2000) was an American middle-distance runner. Originally viewed more as a miler, he made the Olympic final at 800 meters in 1936. He was a native of High Point, North Carolina.

== Career ==
Williamson attended High Point High School in High Point, North Carolina. In 1930, he won the NCHSAA state championship in the mile.

Representing the North Carolina Tar Heels, he was the 1934 Southern Conference champion at both 880 yards and the mile. At the NCAA championships he placed fourth in the mile; as an upcoming talent, he was viewed as one of America's brightest hopes for the 1936 Summer Olympics. In 1935 he placed second in the NCAA championship mile, losing by inches to Emporia State's Archie San Romani as both were timed in 4:19.1.

At the 1936 Olympic Trials, however, Williamson opted for the 800 meters. He was up against world record holder and world leader Ben Eastman, NCAA and national champion Charles Beetham, returning Olympian Chuck Hornbostel and the eventual Olympic champion, John Woodruff. Woodruff ran a very fast 1:49.9 in the semi-finals and was followed home by Abraham Rosenkrantz and Eastman; Williamson qualified as third from the other, slower semi-final, won by Ross Bush. In the final, Williamson and Bush led the way for the first lap. Early in the second lap, Beetham collided with Marmaduke Hobbs, losing his chances; at almost exactly the same time, Rosenkrantz moved to the front. He was then passed by Woodruff and Hornbostel. Williamson closed with a fast sprint; while he failed to catch Woodruff or Hornbostel, he overtook Rosenkrantz at the very end, clinching the third and final Olympic spot in a time of 1:51.4.

At the Olympics in Berlin Williamson won his heat. He also won in his semi-final, making his move in the backstretch to pass 1932 bronze medalist Phil Edwards of Canada. In the final he finished sixth.
