= Athletics at the 1930 British Empire Games – Men's 880 yards =

Men's 880 yards at the Commonwealth Games

The men's 880 yards event at the 1930 British Empire Games was held on 17 and 21 August at the Civic Stadium in Hamilton, Canada.

== Medalists ==
Gold	Silver	Bronze
Tommy Hampson; England	Reg Thomas; England	Alex Wilson; Canada

== Results ==
=== Heats ===
Qualification: First 4 in each heat (Q) qualify directly for the final.

Rank	Heat	Name	Nationality	Time	Notes
1	1	John Chandler	South Africa	1:56.8	Q
2	1	Reg Thomas	England	?:??.?	Q
3	1	Michael Gutteridge	England	?:??.?	Q
4	1	Percy Pickard	Canada	?:??.?	Q
5	1	Herbert Bascombe	Australia	?:??.?	
6	1	Brant Little	Canada	?:??.?	
?	1	Russell MacDougall	Australia	?:??.?	
?	1?	W. Dickson	Ireland	?:??.?	
1	2	Tommy Hampson	England	1:55.6	Q
2	2	Alex Wilson	Canada	?:??.?	Q
3	2	Phil Edwards	British Guiana	?:??.?	Q
4	2	Stuart Townend	England	?:??.?	Q
?	2	William Whyte	Australia	?:??.?	
?	2	W. Johnson	Canada	?:??.?	
?	2	M. O'Malley	Ireland	?:??.?	
?	2	Tom Riddell	Scotland	?:??.?	
?	2	George Golding	Australia	DNF	

=== Final ===
Rank	Name	Nationality	Time	Notes
1st place, gold medalist(s)	Tommy Hampson	England	1:52.4	
2nd place, silver medalist(s)	Reg Thomas	England	1:55.5e	+20 yd
3rd place, bronze medalist(s)	Alex Wilson	Canada	1:55.6e	
4	John Chandler	South Africa	?:??.?	
5	Phil Edwards	British Guiana	?:??.?	
6	Stuart Townend	England	?:??.?	
7	Michael Gutteridge	England	?:??.?	
8	Percy Pickard	Canada	?:??.?	
