= 1934 European Athletics Championships – Men's 800 metres =

Men's 800 metres at the European Athletics Championships
- Venue: Stadio Benito Mussolini
- Location: Turin
- Dates: 8 September (heats); 9 September (final)
- Competitors: 12 from 10 nations
- Winning time: 1:52.0

Medalists
gold medal	Miklós Szabó	Hungary
silver medal	Mario Lanzi	Italy
bronze medal	Wolfgang Dessecker	Germany

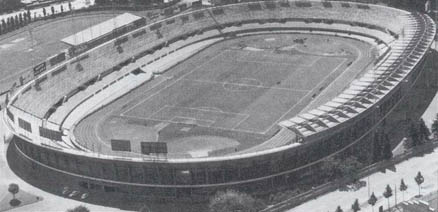
The "Benito Mussolini" Municipal Stadium in Turin.

The men's 800 metres at the 1934 European Athletics Championships was held in Turin, Italy, at the Stadio Benito Mussolini on 8 and 9 September 1934.

== Results ==
=== Final ===
9 September

Rank	Name	Nationality	Time	Notes
1st place, gold medalist(s)	Miklós Szabó	Hungary	1:52.0	NR
2nd place, silver medalist(s)	Mario Lanzi	Italy	1:52.0	
3rd place, bronze medalist(s)	Wolfgang Dessecker	Germany	1:52.2	
4	Eric Ny	Sweden	1:52.4	
5	Erik Wennberg	Sweden	1:53.1	
6	Kazimierz Kucharski	Poland	1:53.4	NR
7	Raymond Petit	France	1:54.0	
8	Pierre Hemmer	Luxembourg	1:55.8	NR
9	Jean Keller	France	NT	

=== Heats ===
8 September

==== Heat 1 ====
Rank	Name	Nationality	Time	Notes
1	Erik Wennberg	Sweden	1:58.7	Q
2	Miklós Szabó	Hungary	1:58.9	Q
3	Pierre Hemmer	Luxembourg	1:59.1	Q
4	Ademar Jürlau	Estonia	1:59.2	

==== Heat 2 ====
Rank	Name	Nationality	Time	Notes
1	Wolfgang Dessecker	Germany	1:57.0	Q
2	Kazimierz Kucharski	Poland	1:57.5	Q
3	Jean Keller	France	1:57.6	Q
4	Evzen Rosický	Czechoslovakia	1:57.8	

==== Heat 3 ====
Rank	Name	Nationality	Time	Notes
1	Mario Lanzi	Italy	1:51.8	Q
2	Eric Ny	Sweden	1:53.0	Q
3	Raymond Petit	France	1:55.3	Q
4	Georg Puchberger	Austria	1:57.0	

== Participation ==
According to an unofficial count, 12 athletes from 10 countries participated in the event.

- Austria (1)
- Czechoslovakia (1)
- Estonia (1)
- France (2)
- Germany (1)
- Hungary (1)
- Italy (1)
- Luxembourg (1)
- Poland (1)
- Sweden (2)
