= 1938 European Athletics Championships – Men's 800 metres =

Men's 800 metres at the European Athletics Championships

The men's 800 metres at the 1938 European Athletics Championships was held in Paris, France, at Stade Olympique de Colombes on 3 and 4 September 1938.

== Medalists ==
Gold	Rudolf Harbig; Germany
Silver	Jacques Lévèque; France
Bronze	Mario Lanzi; Italy

== Results ==
=== Final ===
4 September

Rank	Name	Nationality	Time	Notes
1st place, gold medalist(s)	Rudolf Harbig	Germany	1:50.6	CR, NR
2nd place, silver medalist(s)	Jacques Lévèque	France	1:51.8	
3rd place, bronze medalist(s)	Mario Lanzi	Italy	1:52.0	
4	Sjabbe Bouman	Netherlands	1:52.3	NR
5	Bertil Andersson	Sweden	1:53.0	
6	Tauno Peussa	Finland	1:55.5	
7	Paul Faure	France	NT	
8	Lennart Nilsson	Sweden	NT	
9	Paul Minder	Switzerland	NT	
	Gusztáv Harsányi	Hungary	DNF	

=== Heats ===
3 September

==== Heat 1 ====
Rank	Name	Nationality	Time	Notes
1	Mario Lanzi	Italy	1:53.6	Q
2	Jacques Lévèque	France	1:54.1	Q
3	Lennart Nilsson	Sweden	1:54.2	Q
4	Francis Handley	Great Britain	1:55.0	

==== Heat 2 ====
Rank	Name	Nationality	Time	Notes
1	Rudolf Harbig	Germany	1:54.3	Q
2	Bertil Andersson	Sweden	1:54.9	Q
3	Paul Faure	France	1:55.2	Q
4	Ferenc Temesvári	Hungary	1:55.4	
5	Alfred Baldwin	Great Britain	1:56.6	
6	Emil Goršek	Yugoslavia	2:01.4	
7	Charles Stein	Luxembourg	NT	

==== Heat 3 ====
Rank	Name	Nationality	Time	Notes
1	Sjabbe Bouman	Netherlands	1:56.8	Q
2	Tauno Peussa	Finland	1:57.7	Q
3	Gusztáv Harsányi	Hungary	1:58.4	Q
4	Paul Minder	Switzerland	1:58.6	Q
5	Eraldo Colombo	Italy	1:58.8	
6	Antonio Calado	Portugal	1:58.8	
7	Wacław Gąssowski	Poland	2:02.0	

== Participation ==
According to an unofficial count, 18 athletes from 13 countries participated in the event.

- Finland (1)
- France (2)
- Germany (1)
- Hungary (2)
- Italy (2)
- Luxembourg (1)
- Netherlands (1)
- Poland (1)
- Portugal (1)
- Sweden (2)
- Switzerland (1)
- Great Britain (2)
- Yugoslavia (1)
