= Brogaard =

Brogaard is a surname. Notable people with the surname include:

- Berit Brogaard (born 1970), Danish–American philosopher
- Knut Brogaard (1935–2004), Norwegian footballer
- Mia Brogaard (born 1981), Danish footballer
- Tonny Brogaard (born 1984), Danish footballer
