= Verhaert =

Verhaert is a surname. Notable people with the surname include:

- Piet Verhaert (1852–1908), Belgian painter
- Jean Verhaert (1908–1999), Belgian sprinter
- Joseph Verhaert (1927–1999), Belgian racing cyclist
