= Pierre Hemmer =

Pierre Hemmer may refer to:

- Pierre Hemmer (athlete)
- Pierre Hemmer (entrepreneur)
