= Francisco Valdés (disambiguation) =

Francisco Valdés (Francisco Valdés Muñoz, 1943–2009) was a Chilean footballer and manager.

Francisco Valdés may also refer to:

- Francisco Valdés Cuadra (fl. 1920s), Chilean politician and farmer
- Francisco Valdés Cuevas (1851–1929), Chilean farmer and politician
- Francisco Valdés Subercaseaux (1908–1982), Chilean prelate of the Roman Catholic Church, proposed for beatification
- Francisco Valdés Vergara (1854–1916), Chilean politician and historian

== See also ==
- Francisco Váldez (1900–1974), Peruvian middle-distance runner
