= Aochi =

Aochi (written: 青地) is a Japanese surname. Notable people with the surname include:

- Kumao Aochi (青地 球磨男, 1914–2004), Japanese middle-distance runner
- Seiji Aochi (青地 清二, 1942–2008), Japanese ski jumper
- Aochi Shigetsuna (青地 茂綱, died 1570), Japanese samurai
