= Athletics at the 1932 Summer Olympics – Men's 800 metres =

Men's 800 metres at the Games of the X Olympiad
- Venue: Los Angeles Memorial Coliseum
- Dates: August 1 and August 2, 1932
- Competitors: 21 from 11 nations
- Winning time: 1:49.7 WR

Medalists
1st place, gold medalist(s)		Tommy Hampson; Great Britain
2nd place, silver medalist(s)		Alex Wilson; Canada
3rd place, bronze medalist(s)		Phil Edwards; Canada

The men's 800 metres middle distance event at the 1932 Summer Olympics took place on August 1 and August 2 at the Los Angeles Memorial Coliseum. Twenty-one athletes from 11 nations competed. The 1930 Olympic Congress in Berlin had reduced the limit from 4 athletes per NOC to 3 athletes. The event was won by Tommy Hampson, the fourth consecutive British victory (it would be the last in the streak) and fifth overall British title in the 800 metres. Canada won its first two 800 metres medals with silver (Alex Wilson) and bronze (Phil Edwards).

== Background ==
This was the ninth appearance of the event, which is one of 12 athletics events to have been held at every Summer Olympics. None of the medalists from 1928 returned, but three finalists did: fourth-place finisher Phil Edwards of Canada, sixth-place finisher Séra Martin of France, and eighth-place finisher Jean Keller of France. American Ben Eastman would have been favored in the event, but he ran only in the 400 metres in Los Angeles. The field was otherwise "considered open."

New Zealand appeared in the event for the first time. Great Britain and the United States each made their eighth appearance, tied for the most among all nations.

== Competition format ==
With only 21 athletes, the three-round format introduced in 1912 was impractical. Only two rounds were held, still with the nine-man final introduced in 1920. There were three semifinals with 7 athletes each; the top three runners in each semifinal advanced to the nine-man final.

== Records ==
These were the standing world and Olympic records (in minutes) prior to the 1932 Summer Olympics.

World record	Séra Martin (FRA)	1:50.6	Paris, France	14 July 1928
Olympic record	Douglas Lowe (GBR)	1:51.8	Amsterdam, Netherlands	31 July 1928

Tommy Hampson broke the world record in the final, setting the new record at 1:49.7.

== Schedule ==
Date	Time	Round
Monday, 1 August 1932	16:30	Semifinals
Tuesday, 2 August 1932	15:45	Final

== Results ==
=== Semifinals ===
Three heats were held; the fastest three runners in each advanced to the final round.

==== Semifinal 1 ====
Rank	Athlete	Nation	Time	Notes
1	Edwin Genung	United States	1:54.8	Q
2	Phil Edwards	Canada	1:55.1	Q
3	Jack Powell	Great Britain	1:55.6	Q
4	Don Evans	New Zealand	1:56.6	
5	Paul Martin	Switzerland	1:58.4	
6	Nestor Gomes	Brazil	2:00.5	
—	Jean Keller	France	DNF	

==== Semifinal 2 ====
Rank	Athlete	Nation	Time	Notes
1	Chuck Hornbostel	United States	1:52.4	Q
2	Alex Wilson	Canada	1:52.5	Q
3	Otto Peltzer	Germany	1:53.6	Q
4	Hjalle Johannesen	Norway	1:54.3	
5	Hermenegildo del Rosso	Argentina	1:54.9	
6	René Morel	France	1:55.2	
7	José Lucílo Iturbe	Mexico	1:55.6	

==== Semifinal 3 ====
Rank	Athlete	Nation	Time	Notes
1	Tommy Hampson	Great Britain	1:53.0	Q
2	Séra Martin	France	1:53.2	Q
3	Edwin Turner	United States	1:54.0	Q
4	Eddie King	Canada	1:54.4	
5	Max Danz	Germany	1:58.9	
6	Domingos Puglisi	Brazil	1:59.4	
7	Miguel Vasconcelos	Mexico	2:00.0	

=== Final ===
Rank	Athlete	Nation	Time	Notes
1st place, gold medalist(s)	Tommy Hampson	Great Britain	1:49.8	WR
2nd place, silver medalist(s)	Alex Wilson	Canada	1:49.9	
3rd place, bronze medalist(s)	Phil Edwards	Canada	1:51.5	
4	Edwin Genung	United States	1:51.7	
5	Edwin Turner	United States	1:52.5	
6	Chuck Hornbostel	United States	1:52.7	
7	Jack Powell	Great Britain	1:53.0	
8	Séra Martin	France	1:53.6	
9	Otto Peltzer	Germany	1:55.0	
