= 1931 NCAA Track and Field Championships =

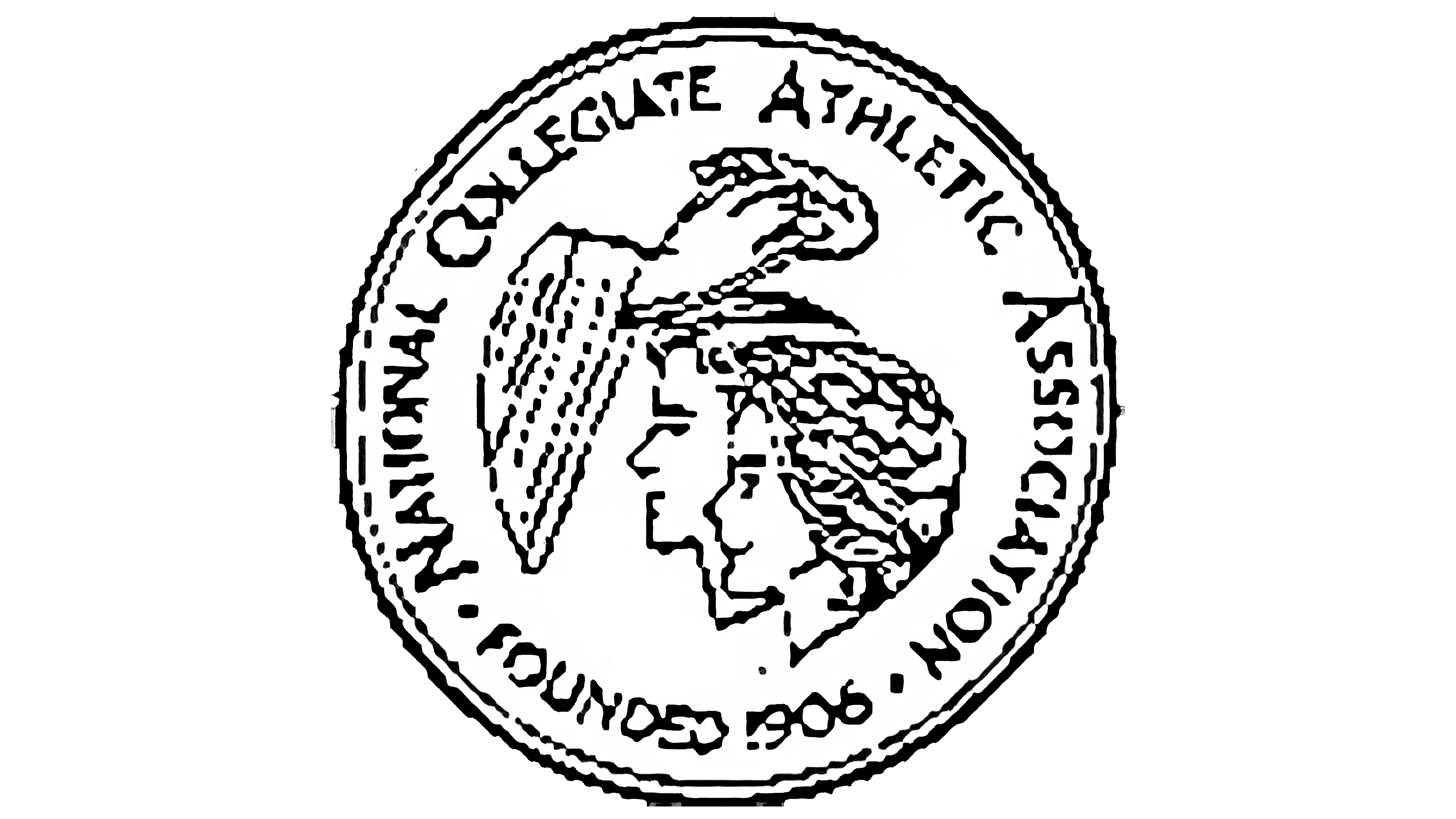
- Team Champion: USC (3rd title)
- Edition: 10th
- Dates: June 5-6, 1931
- Host city: (Illinois) Chicago, Illinois; University of Chicago
- Venue: Stagg Field
- Events: 14

The 1931 NCAA Track and Field Championships was the ninth NCAA track and field championship. The meet was held at Stagg Field in Chicago, Illinois in June 1931. Athletes from 80 universities and colleges participated in the meet.

== Team championship ==
1. Southern California - 77-1/7 points (NCAA record)
2. Ohio State - 31-1/7 points
3. Illinois - 28 points
4. Iowa - 26-1/7 points
5. Indiana - 26 points
6. Wisconsin - 23¾ points
7. Michigan - 20 points
8. Iowa St. - 16 points
8. Miami (Ohio) - 16 points
10. Michigan State - 14 points
10. Oregon - 14 points

== Track events ==
100-yard dash
1. Frank Wykoff, USC - 9.6 seconds
2. Eddie Tolan. Michigan
3. Emmett Toppino, Loyola (New Orleans)
4. George "Dee" Hutson, Denison
5. Jesse Fazekas, Ohio St.
6. Peyton Glass, Oklahoma Aggies

120-yard high hurdles
1. Jack Keller, Ohio St. - 14.6 seconds
2. Jimmy Hatfield, Indiana
3. Bob Hager, Iowa St.
4. Ken Yarger, Michigan St.
5. Charles Scheifley, Minnesota
6. Bill Stokes, USC

220-yard dash
1. Eddie Tolan, Michigan - 21.5 seconds
2. Peyton Glass, Oklahoma Aggies
3. George "Dee" Hutson, Denison
4. Jesse Fazekas, Ohio St.
5. Roy Delby, USC
6. Tierney, Marquette

220-yard low hurdles
1. Jack Keller, Ohio St. - 23.8 seconds
2. Bill Carls, USC
3. Brownlee, Duke
4. James Cave, Illinois
5. Jimmy Hatfield, Indiana
6. Eugene Beatty, Michigan Normal

440-yard dash
1. Victor Willams, USC - 48.3 seconds
2. James Gordon, Miami
3. Art Woessner, USC
4. Arnold, Michigan Normal
5. Talbot Hartley, Washington
6. John McCague, Union

880-yard run
1. Dale Letts, Chicago - 1:53.5
2. Alex Wilson, Notre Dame
3. Edwin Genung, Washington
4. Bill Bloor, Ohio St.
5. Edwin Turner, Michigan
6. Elmer Gray, Abilene Christian

One-mile run
1. Ray Putnam, Iowa St. - 4:18.0
2. Ralph Hill, Oregon
3. Glen Dawson, Oklahoma
4. Pearson, North Dakota
5. Prichard, Hamilton
6. Joe Spivak, Butler

Two-mile run
1. Clark Chamberlin, Michigan St. - 9:23.0
2. Charles Shugert, Miami
3. Clifford Watson, Indiana
4. Henry Brocksmith, Indiana
5. George Wright, Wisconsin
6. Mike Pilbrow, Grinnell

== Field events ==
Broad jump
1. Edward Gordon, Iowa 24 feet, 11¾ inches
2. Lamoine Boyle, Penn
3. Dick Barber, USC
4. Donald Gray, Nebraska
5. Clifford Mell, Oklahoma
6. Bert Hoiston, Ohio St.

High jump
1. Darrell Jones, Ball St. - 6 feet, 3¾ inches
2. Milton Ehrlich, Kansas Aggies
3. Will Brannan, USC
3. Ted Shaw, Wisconsin
3. Jack Stewart, Alabama Poly
6. Jim Stewart, USC
6. Bert Nelson, Butler
6. Ralston Russell, Ohio St
6. Edward Gordon, Iowa
6. Cam Hackle, Minnesota
6. Nelson Schrier, Western St. Teachers
6. Bob Schroeder, Kansas St. Teachers

Pole vault
1. Bill Graber, USC 13 feet, 10 inches
1. Verne McDermont, Illinois
1. Tom Warne, Northwestern
4. Clyde Coffman, Kansas
4. Don Zimmerman, Tulane
4. Ralph Lovshin, Wisconsin
4. Ralph Johnson, Notre Dame

Discus throw
1. Bob Hall, USC 152 feet, 7½ inches
2. Frank Purma, Illinois
3. Ed Moeller, Oregon
4. Greg Kabat, Wisconsin
5. Gerboth, Milwaukee St. Teachers
6. Wesley Youngerman, Iowa

Javelin
1. Ken Churchill, California 215 feet, 0 inches
2. Elmo Nelson, Iowa
3. Homer Hein, Washington St.
4. Lee Weldon, Iowa
5. Ken McKenzie, USC
6. Sam Robinson, Alabama Poly

Shot put
1. Bob Hall, USC 49 feet, 9 inches
2. Sammy Behr, Wisconsin
3. Hugh Rhea, Nebraska
4. Clarence Munn, Minnesota
5. LeRoy Dues, College of City of Detroit
6. Percy Burk, Rice Institute

Hammer throw
1. Ivan Dyekman, Colorado Aggies 162 feet, 1½ inches
2. Otto Hills, Illinois
3. Noble Biddinger, Indiana
4. Arthur Frisch, Wisconsin
5. Wesley Youngerman, Iowa
6. Elgar Mathies, Iowa

== See also ==
- NCAA Men's Outdoor Track and Field Championship
