= Mario Lanzi =

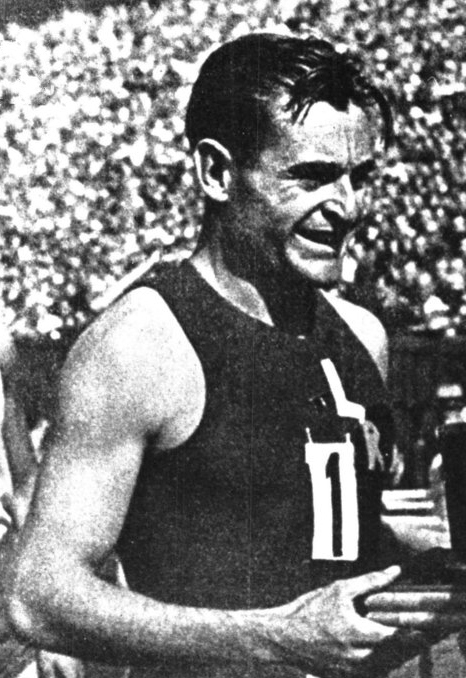
- Lanzi in 1936

Personal information
- Nationality: Italian
- Born: 10 October 1914 Castelletto sopra Ticino, Italy
- Died: 21 February 1980 (aged 65) Schio, Italy
- Height: 1.80 m (5 ft 11 in)
- Weight: 76 kg (168 lb)

Sport
- Country: Italy
- Sport: Athletics
- Event: Middle-distance running
- Club: G. S. Baracca

Achievements and titles
- Personal bests: 400 m: 46.7 (1939); 800 m: 1:49.0 (1939)
Medal record
Men's athletics
Representing Italy
Olympic Games
Silver medal – second place	1936 Berlin	800 m
European Championships
Silver medal – second place	1934 Turin	800 m
Bronze medal – third place	1938 Paris	800 m

Mario Lanzi (10 October 1914 – 21 February 1980) was an Italian athlete in the 1930s who specialised in the 800 metres and also competed over 400 metres.

== Biography ==
Lanzi was born at Castelletto sopra Ticino, in the province of Novara (Piedmont).

He won the silver medal at the 1936 Summer Olympics in Berlin over 800 m, finishing behind John Woodruff. In his native Italy Lanzi was without any serious rival. However, Lanzi lost the 800 m final at the 1938 European Championships in Athletics to Rudolf Harbig. Lanzi was famous for confusing his opponents by starting 800 m races like a sprinter.

Lanzi died at Schio (Veneto), where he had worked as coach, in 1980.

== National titles ==
Lanzi won 13 individual Italian national championship titles, 5 at 400 metres and 8 at 800 metres.

- 400 metres: 1937, 1940, 1941, 1942, 1943
- 800 metres: 1934, 1935, 1936, 1938, 1939, 1942, 1943, 1946
