= High Point Central High School =

American public school in North Carolina

Location
- 801 Ferndale Blvd; High Point, North Carolina 27262; United States

Information
- Type: Public
- Established: 1927 (99 years ago)
- School district: Guilford County Schools
- CEEB code: 341850
- Principal: Mike Hettenbach
- Teaching staff: 78.42 (FTE)
- Grades: 9–12
- Enrollment: 1,007 (2023–2024)
- Student to teacher ratio: 12.84
- Campus type: Urban
- Colors: Navy, Maroon, and White
- Slogan: "Roll Bison"
- Mascot: Bison
- Newspaper: Pointer (no longer in publication)
- Yearbook: Pemican
- Website: hpcentralhs.gcsnc.com

High Point Central High School is a public high school located in High Point, North Carolina. The school has a population of approximately 1,237 (2020–2021) students in 9th–12th grades. The school's offerings include Advanced Placement classes and the International Baccalaureate degree program.

== History ==
The High Point City Schools were established in 1897, but there was not a distinct high school until "High Point High School" was founded in 1926. The current building was erected in 1927, on what was formerly the High Point city fair grounds, and is the oldest high school in Guilford County.

The school building is an example of Gothic architecture, with three floors and four towers. Charles F. Thomlinson was the chairman of the school board when High Point High School was built. He was the first person to have a vision for what High Point High School should be like. In 1927, T. Wingate Andrews (Superintendent of High Point City Schools) presided over the dedication of the building. In 1968, High Point's William Penn High School closed. In response to that, a new second high school, T. Wingate Andrews High School would open, ending High Point's era of school segregation.

High Point High School was renamed "High Point Central High School" around 1962, and is so named today.

== Campus ==
=== Building ===
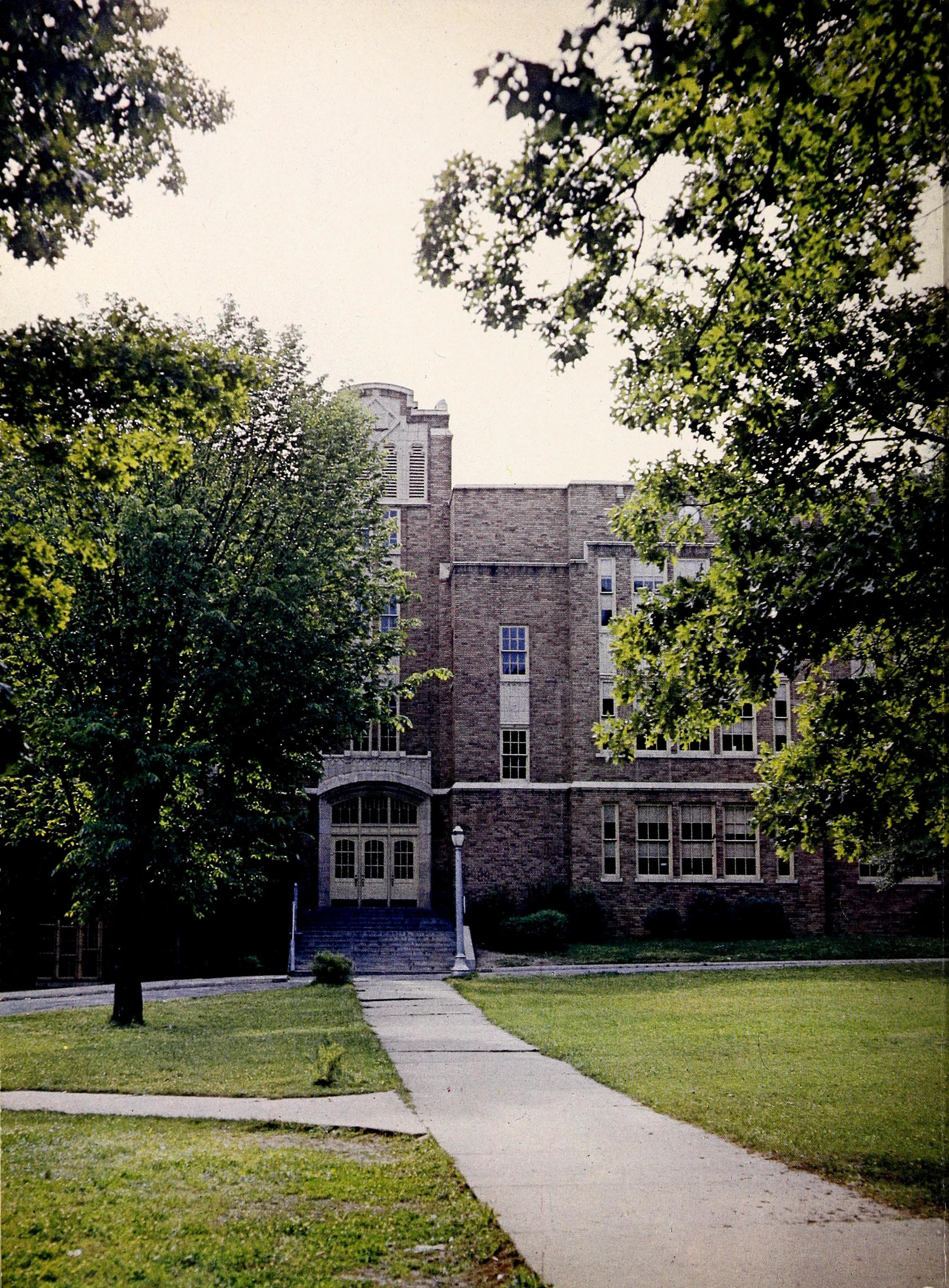
One of the building's entrances, circa 1960

The current building was completed in 1927 and designed by Greensboro architect Harry Barton, in Collegiate Gothic style. The building was considered the grandest educational building in the state and was modern for its time. The building was decorated in tapestry brick with terracotta architectural ornamentation. The halls on the interior of the building had tile and terrazzo floors, intricate plaster moldings and ceiling medallions with cherubs, fine woodworking and custom cabinetry.

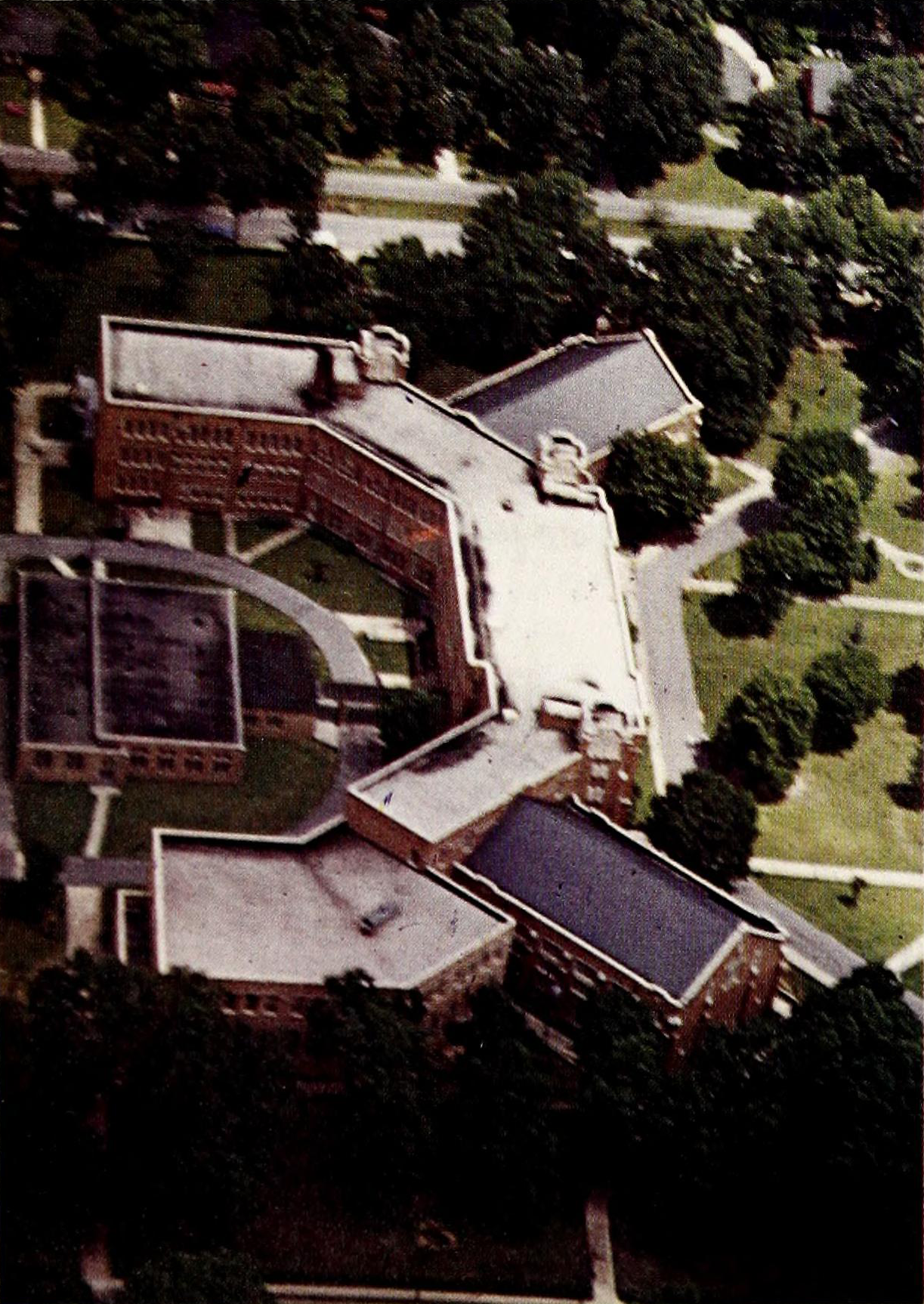
The school's main building from above, circa 1962

High Point High School was also outfitted with modern technological innovations for its time including a central vacuum system, and an innovative heating and air conditioning system. The three Gothic entrance towers, each four stories high, held an ice bin. Large fans circulated the cool air from the ice bins throughout the school. The melted water was intended to be used in the several water fountains throughout the campus.

=== Grounds ===
The grounds of High Point High School were landscaped by prominent landscape architect Earl S. Draper, who had also designed the High Point suburb of Emerywood. The campus had a network of sidewalks, complemented by oak trees and shrubbery. The campus also had hedges surrounding the eastern and northern boundaries of the campus along Ferndale Boulevard and the sports field. A driveway for cars and buses ran along the front of the school and was cased by a grand gateway built of tapestry brick, and cast stone ornamentation. Sadly, much of the cast stone ornamentation was lost over the years to vandalism. The sports ground originally included a tennis court, baseball field, and a track and field. Over the years, it has grown to include a large gymnasium and an expanded tennis court.

=== Additions ===
In 1957, a new gymnasium was built on the sports ground, while a new cafeteria building was built in the rear courtyard of the main building. In 1962, a three-story addition was added to the northwestern section of the school. This addition provided numerous classrooms and two modern science laboratories: a chemistry lab and a physics lab. In 1975, new windows were installed to replace the energy inefficient ones. The elegant gothic carved doors and transoms were gradually removed from the buildings main entrance in favor of new metal doors from 1977 to 1981.

High Point Central High School was extensively renovated in 2002. A new air conditioning system was installed after several heat waves occurred during the previous years, while the original radiators were scrapped. The ornate plaster ceilings were removed on all floors except for the first floor hallway in front of the theater in favor of drop-down foam ceiling tiles. In 2003, a red awning was installed over the entrance of tower four. An aluminum covered walkway was also installed to provide shelter to the elementary students walking from the neighboring Tomlinson Montessori School, to the cafeteria for their lunch. In the late 2000s Tomlinson Montessori vacated their school building and High Point Central moved several classes to the building. The academy at Central now occupies the Tomlinson Building. In 2010, funds were appropriated for the construction of a new addition and renovations to the 1957 gymnasium. The addition of a new cafeteria was completed in 2017, and a new media center now occupies the old cafeteria building.

== Academics ==
High Point Central High is home to an International Baccalaureate program and Advanced Placement program. These programs offer students courses and college credit. Honors courses and College preparation courses are also offered as well. High Point Central High School's IB program is the only IB program offered in High Point and was established in 1995. AP courses have been offered at High Point Central since the 1970s.

== Notable alumni ==
- Heather Bergsma — American speed skater, bronze medalist at the 2018 Winter Olympics in women's team pursuit, gold medalist at World Sprint and World Single Distances Championships
- James Betterson — former NFL running back
- James H. Burnley IV — politician and lawyer
- Tamara Clark — American track and field sprinter, gold medalist at 2023 World Championships in the women's 4×100 metres relay
- Dick Culler — former MLB shortstop
- Butch Estes — men's college basketball head coach
- Anthony Dean Griffey — opera singer
- J. D. Hayworth — conservative political commentator, author, and former Representative of Arizona's 5th and 6th congressional districts
- Ray Hayworth — former MLB catcher, 1935 World Series champion with the Detroit Tigers
- Sammy Johnson — former NFL running back
- The Lucas Bros — Academy Award-nominated writers and producers of Judas and the Black Messiah
- Jenn Lyon — actress
- Germaine Pratt — NFL linebacker
- Tony Shaver — men's college basketball head coach
- Corbin Waller — former professional soccer player
- Tim Ward — NFL defensive end, Super Bowl LIV champion with the Kansas City Chiefs
- Drew Weaver — professional golfer, played on the PGA Tour
- Harry Williamson — American middle-distance track runner, made the Olympic final of the 800 metres at the 1936 Summer Olympics
