= Erik Wennberg =

Swedish middle-distance runner

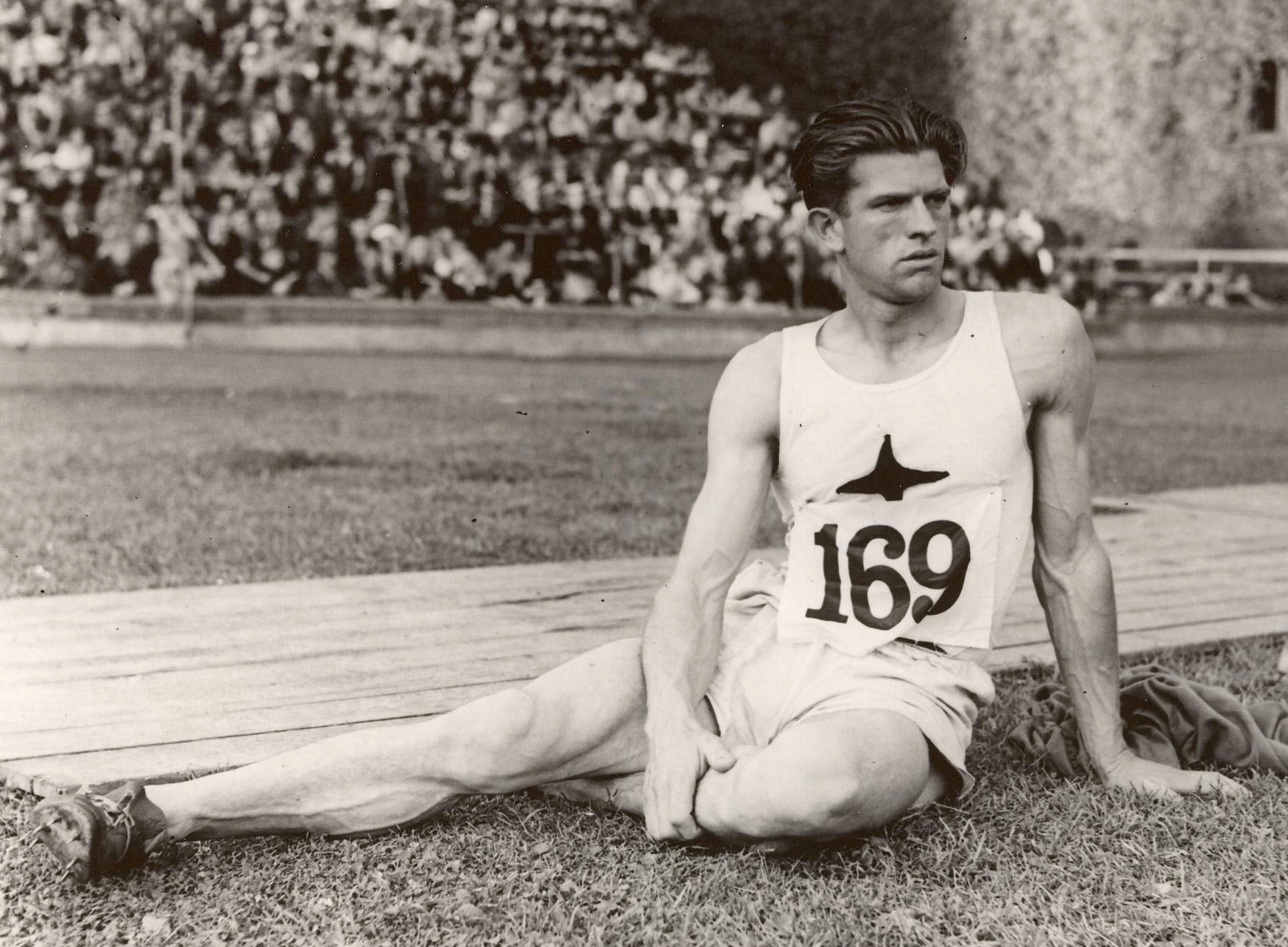

Personal information
- Born: 28 March 1910 Trelleborg, Sweden
- Died: 1982 (aged 71–72)

Sport
- Sport: Athletics
- Events: 800 m, 1500 m
- Club: IFK Trelleborg

Achievements and titles
- Personal bests: 800 m – 1:52.7 (1934); 1500 m – 3:55.3 (1934)

Erik Wennberg (28 March 1910 – 1982) was a Swedish middle-distance runner who won the national 800 m title in 1934 and 1935. He placed fifth in this event at the 1934 European Championships.
