= Edwin Genung =

American middle-distance runner

Edwin Bernard Genung (February 15, 1908 - May 2, 1986) was an American middle-distance runner. He placed 4th in the 800 meters at the 1932 Summer Olympics.

== Career ==
As a sophomore at the University of Washington, Genung was NCAA champion in 1929 at 880 yards. Although he failed to win at the NCAA meet again (he placed third as a senior in 1931), he did win the national championship in both 1930 and 1931, breaking the meeting record both times. In 1932 the national championships in Stanford doubled as the Olympic Trials and Genung won for the third time, beating that year's NCAA winner Charles Hornbostel. Genung thus qualified for the Olympics in Los Angeles, where he won his heat to make it to the final; in the final, he finished just out of medals in fourth place.
