= Carlos Marcenaro =

Peruvian middle-distance runner

Personal information
- Full name: Carlos Marcenaro Hidalgo
- Born: 12 August 1912 Lima, Peru
- Died: 20 August 1988 (aged 76)

Sport
- Sport: Middle-distance running
- Event: 800 metres

Carlos Marcenaro Hidalgo (12 August 1912 – 20 August 1988) was a Peruvian middle-distance runner. He competed in the men's 800 metres at the 1936 Summer Olympics.
