= Ab Conway =

Canadian middle-distance runner

Personal information
- Full name: Charles Abbott Conway
- Born: 7 October 1914 Moose Jaw, Saskatchewan, Canada
- Died: 10 March 2001 (aged 86)

Sport
- Sport: Middle-distance running
- Event: 800 metres

Charles Abbott "Ab" Conway (7 October 1914 – 10 March 2001) was a Canadian middle-distance runner. He competed in the men's 800 metres at the 1936 Summer Olympics.
