= Toshinao Tomie =

Japanese middle-distance runner

Personal information
- Nationality: Japanese
- Born: 15 August 1910 Itoigawa, Niigata, Japan

Sport
- Sport: Middle-distance running
- Event: 800 metres

Toshinao Tomie (富江 利直, Tomie Toshinao; born 15 August 1910) was a Japanese middle-distance runner. He competed in the men's 800 metres at the 1936 Summer Olympics.
