= René Soulier =

French middle-distance runner

Personal information
- Born: 29 September 1911 La Bourboule, France
- Died: 22 May 1991 (aged 79) Cébazat, France
- Height: 185 cm (6 ft 1 in)
- Weight: 71 kg (157 lb)

Sport
- Country: France
- Sport: Athletics (middle-distance running)
- Event: 800 metres

René Soulier (29 September 1911 – May 22, 1991) was a French middle-distance runner. He competed in the men's 800 metres at the 1936 Summer Olympics.
