= Ewald Mertens =

German middle-distance runner (1909–1965)

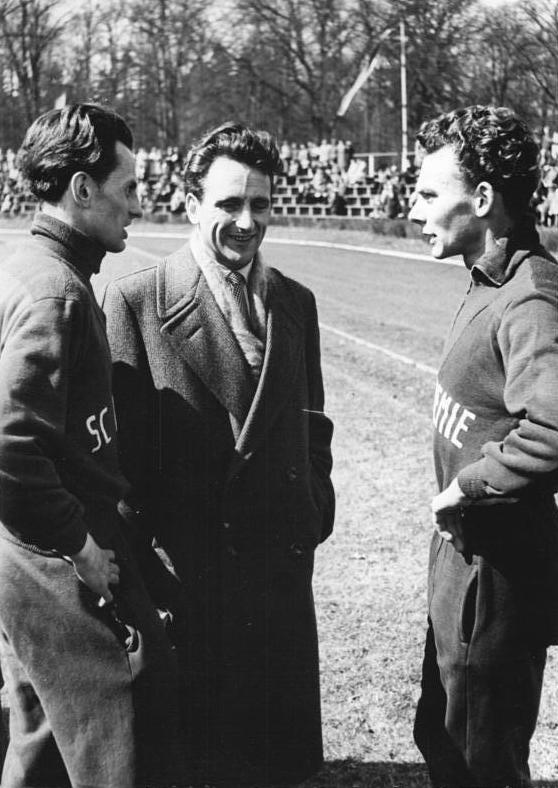
- Mertens (center) as trainer

Personal information
- Nationality: German
- Born: 24 September 1909
- Died: 7 February 1965 (aged 55) East Berlin

Sport
- Sport: Middle-distance running
- Event: 800 metres

Ewald Mertens (24 September 1909 – 7 February 1965) was a German middle-distance runner. He competed in the men's 800 metres at the 1936 Summer Olympics. He was awarded an Honoured Master of Sport. He died in a hospital in Berlin after a long illness.
