= Tom Riddell =

Scottish athlete

Personal information
- Nationality: British (Scottish)
- Born: 1905
- Died: 1998 (aged 92)

Sport
- Sport: Athletics
- Event: Middle distance
- Club: Shettleston Harriers

Thomas M. Riddell (1905 – 1998) was a track and field athlete from Scotland who competed at the 1930 British Empire Games (now Commonwealth Games).

== Biography ==
Riddell became the British champion over 880 yards in 1926 due to being the highest placed British athlete at the 1926 AAA Championships, when he finished third behind Frenchman Georges Baraton.

Riddell was a member of the Shettleston Harriers Athletics Club and won the 1 mile title at the 1930 Scottish AAA Championships.

Leaving Scotland on the Anchor-Donaldson liner Audania, he arrived in Canada and represented the Scottish Empire Games team at the 1930 British Empire Games in Hamilton, Ontario, Canada, participating in one event, 880 yards.

Riddell successfully retained his mile title at the 1931 Scottish AAAs and at the 1934 Scottish AAA Championships he won the 1 mile title for the seventh time and fifth in succession. He was living in Belfast at this time.

He was selected for the 1932 Olympic Games but he had to decline due to work commitments.
