= Athletics at the 1936 Summer Olympics – Men's 800 metres =

Men's 800 metres at the Games of the XI Olympiad
- Venue: Olympiastadion: Berlin, Germany
- Dates: August 2, 1936 (heats); August 3, 1936 (semifinals); August 4, 1936 (final)
- Competitors: 42 from 23 nations
- Winning time: 1:52.9 WR

Medalists
1st place, gold medalist(s)		John Woodruff; United States
2nd place, silver medalist(s)		Mario Lanzi; Italy
3rd place, bronze medalist(s)		Phil Edwards; Canada

The men's 800 metres event at the 1936 Summer Olympic Games took place between August 2 and August 4. Forty-two athletes from 23 nations competed. The maximum number of athletes per nation had been set at 3 since the 1930 Olympic Congress. The final was won by American John Woodruff.

Woodruff's win broke a streak of four British victories in the 800 metres and started a streak of four American victories. (Great Britain missed the podium entirely.) It was the United States' first title in the event since 1912, and fourth overall. Mario Lanzi's silver was Italy's second medal in the event, after another silver in 1908. Phil Edwards repeated his bronze performance from 1932, becoming the third man to win a second medal in the 800 metres.

== Summary ==
With all runners starting from a crouch position, in the middle of the straightaway, the only returning medalist from 1932, Phil Edwards, rushed to the lead. Down the backstretch he was joined by John Woodruff, who was among the favorites to win the race despite his inexperience. For the second day in a row, the German home crowd was seeing two black North Americans leading a final after Jesse Owens and Ralph Metcalfe winning the 100 metres. Along the home stretch, Kazimierz Kucharski came along the outside, with Brian MacCabe in tow, effectively boxing Woodruff on the rail. Sensing the danger, Woodruff slowed, dropping to sixth place but giving himself free running room. With a long relaxed stride, the tall Woodruff ran around the outside and past Edwards into the lead. Heading into the final turn, Edwards again accelerated into the lead, but Woodruff stayed with him as both separated from Kucharski and Chuck Hornbostel. With the trailers struggling, a path down the rail opened up for Mario Lanzi to run past them on the inside. Through the turn, Edwards was unable to break Woodruff. Coming off the turn, it was Woodruff's long stride that took the advantage over the smaller Edwards. Now it was Edwards who was struggling as Woodruff pulled away with only half the straightaway to the finish. Lanzi seized the opportunity to run past Edwards on the outside, but there was no time to run after Woodruff.

== Background ==
This was the 10th appearance of the event, which is one of 12 athletics events to have been held at every Summer Olympics. Three finalists from 1932 returned: bronze medalist Phil Edwards of Canada (who was also the fourth-place finisher in 1928), sixth-place finisher Chuck Hornbostel of the United States, and seventh-place finisher Jack Powell of Great Britain. Along with Edwards, Rudolf Harbig of Germany and John Woodruff of the United States were the favorites.

Peru and Yugoslavia appeared in the event for the first time. Great Britain and the United States each made their ninth appearance, tied for the most among all nations.

== Competition format ==
There were again enough competitors to return to the three-round format introduced in 1912 (after a two-round version in 1932). There were six first-round heats, each with between 6 and 8 athletes; the top four runners in each heat advanced to the semifinals. There were three semifinals with 8 athletes each; the top three runners in each semifinal advanced to the nine-man final.

== Records ==
These were the standing world and Olympic records (in minutes) prior to the 1936 Summer Olympics.

World record	Ben Eastman (USA)	1:49.8y	Princeton, United States	16 June 1934
Olympic record	Tommy Hampson (GBR)	1:49.7	Los Angeles, United States	2 August 1932

No world or Olympic records were set during the competition.

== Schedule ==
Date	Time	Round
Sunday, 2 August 1936	16:00	Round 1
Monday, 3 August 1936	17:15	Semifinals
Tuesday, 4 August 1936	17:45	Final

== Results ==
=== Round 1 ===
The fastest four runners in each of the six heats advanced to the semifinal round.

==== Heat 1 ====
Rank	Athlete	Nation	Time	Notes
1	Phil Edwards	Canada	1:53.7	Q
2	Chuck Hornbostel	United States	1:53.7	Q
3	Jean Verhaert	Belgium	1:54.3	Q
4	Ferenc Temesvári	Hungary	1:55.0	Q
5	Pierre Hemmer	Luxembourg	1:56.3	
6	Rudolf Harbig	Germany	1:56.8	
7	Francisco Váldez	Peru	Unknown	
8	Stavros Velkopoulos	Greece	Unknown	
—	Erik Wennberg	Sweden	DNS	

==== Heat 2 ====
Rank	Athlete	Nation	Time	Notes
1	Harry Williamson	United States	1:56.2	Q
2	Ab Conway	Canada	1:56.2	Q
3	Pat Boot	New Zealand	1:56.6	Q
4	Emil Hübscher	Austria	1:57.3	Q
5	Emil Goršek	Yugoslavia	1:59.5	
6	Carlos Marcenaro	Peru	2:00.8	
—	Abu Al-Yazid El-Halawani	Egypt	DNS	
—	René Morel	France	DNS	
—	Ossi Teileri	Finland	DNS	

==== Heat 3 ====
Rank	Athlete	Nation	Time	Notes
1	Brian MacCabe	Great Britain	1:54.5	Q
2	Raymond Petit	France	1:54.8	Q
3	Hjalmar Johannessen	Norway	1:54.9	Q
4	Ewald Mertens	Germany	1:55.1	Q
5	Clarke Scholtz	South Africa	1:57.6	
6	Toshinao Tomie	Japan	1:59.9	
7	Stanislav Otáhal	Czechoslovakia	Unknown	
8	Gyan Bhalla	India	Unknown	
—	Fritz Sollberger	Switzerland	DNS	

==== Heat 4 ====
Rank	Athlete	Nation	Time	Notes
1	Gerald Backhouse	Australia	1:57.7	Q
2	Miklós Szabó	Hungary	1:57.8	Q
3	John Woodruff	United States	1:58.7	Q
4	Frank Handley	Great Britain	1:58.9	Q
5	Evžen Rošický	Czechoslovakia	1:59.5	
6	Paul Martin	Switzerland	2:00.0	
7	Charles Stein	Luxembourg	Unknown	
—	Francisc Nemeș	Romania	DNS	
—	Eric Ny	Sweden	DNS	

==== Heat 5 ====
Rank	Athlete	Nation	Time	Notes
1	Jack Powell	Great Britain	1:56.0	Q
2	Mario Lanzi	Italy	1:56.1	Q
3	Franz Eichberger	Austria	1:56.3	Q
4	József Vadas	Hungary	1:56.5	Q
5	Willie Botha	South Africa	1:57.0	
6	Grigorios Georgakopoulos	Greece	1:57.3	
7	Jack Liddle	Canada	Unknown	
—	Miguel Castro	Chile	DNS	
—	Luis Pratsmasó	Spain	DNS	

==== Heat 6 ====
Rank	Athlete	Nation	Time	Notes
1	Juan Carlos Anderson	Argentina	1:55.1	Q
2	Kazimierz Kucharski	Poland	1:55.7	Q
3	Wolfgang Dessecker	Germany	1:56.0	Q
4	René Soulier	France	1:56.1	Q
5	William Lindeque	South Africa	1:56.4	
6	Kumao Aochi	Japan	1:56.8	
—	Jia Lianren	Republic of China	DNS	
—	Karlo Nikhazi	Yugoslavia	DNS	
—	Enrique Piferrer	Spain	DNS	

=== Semifinals ===
The fastest three runners in each of the three heats advanced to the final round.

==== Semifinal 1 ====
Rank	Athlete	Nation	Time	Notes
1	John Woodruff	United States	1:52.7	Q
2	Kazimierz Kucharski	Poland	1:54.7	Q
3	Juan Carlos Anderson	Argentina	1:54.8	Q
4	Miklós Szabó	Hungary	1:55.1	
5	Wolfgang Dessecker	Germany	1:55.3	
6	Franz Eichberger	Austria	1:56.2	
7	Pat Boot	New Zealand	Unknown	
8	Frank Handley	Great Britain	Unknown	

==== Semifinal 2 ====
Rank	Athlete	Nation	Time	Notes
1	Harry Williamson	United States	1:53.1	Q
2	Gerald Backhouse	Australia	1:53.2	Q
3	Phil Edwards	Canada	1:53.2	Q
4	Jack Powell	Great Britain	1:54.8	
5	Ewald Mertens	Germany	1:54.9	
6	René Soulier	France	1:56.8	
7	Emil Hübscher	Austria	Unknown	
8	József Vadas	Hungary	Unknown	

==== Semifinal 3 ====
Rank	Athlete	Nation	Time	Notes
1	Chuck Hornbostel	United States	1:53.2	Q
2	Mario Lanzi	Italy	1:54.1	Q
3	Brian MacCabe	Great Britain	1:55.4	Q
4	Raymond Petit	France	1:55.7	
5	Ab Conway	Canada	1:55.9	
6	Hjalmar Johannessen	Norway	1:56.0	
7	Ferenc Temesvári	Hungary	Unknown	
8	Jean Verhaert	Belgium	Unknown	

=== Final ===
Rank	Athlete	Nation	Time
1st place, gold medalist(s)	John Woodruff	United States	1:52.9
2nd place, silver medalist(s)	Mario Lanzi	Italy	1:53.3
3rd place, bronze medalist(s)	Phil Edwards	Canada	1:53.6
4	Kazimierz Kucharski	Poland	1:53.8
5	Chuck Hornbostel	United States	1:54.6
6	Harry Williamson	United States	1:55.8
7	Juan Carlos Anderson	Argentina	Unknown
8	Gerald Backhouse	Australia	Unknown
9	Brian MacCabe	Great Britain	Unknown
