= Franz Eichberger (athlete) =

Austrian middle-distance runner

Personal information
- Nationality: Austrian
- Born: 26 March 1913
- Died: 31 December 2004 (aged 91)

Sport
- Sport: Middle-distance running
- Event: 800 metres

Franz Eichberger (26 March 1913 – 31 December 2004) was an Austrian middle-distance runner. He competed in the men's 800 metres at the 1936 Summer Olympics.
