= Nestor Gomes (athlete) =

Brazilian middle-distance runner (1909–??)

Personal information
- Born: 7 September 1909 São Paulo, Brazil

Sport
- Sport: Middle-distance running
- Event: 800 metres

Nestor Gomes (born 7 September 1909, date of death unknown) was a Brazilian middle-distance runner. He competed in the men's 800 metres at the 1932 Summer Olympics.
