= Miguel Vasconcelos =

Mexican middle-distance runner

Personal information
- Born: 10 January 1910 Mexico City, Mexico
- Died: 2 November 1993 (aged 83) Mexico City, Mexico

Sport
- Sport: Middle-distance running
- Event: 800 metres

Miguel Vasconcelos (10 January 1910 – 2 November 1993) was a Mexican middle-distance runner. He competed in the men's 800 metres at the 1932 Summer Olympics.
