= Emil Hübscher =

Austrian middle-distance runner 1912–1958

Emil Franz Hübscher
Personal information
- Nationality: Austrian
- Born: 3 September 1912 Vienna, Austria
- Died: 25 February 1958 (aged 45) Vienna, Austria

Sport
- Sport: Middle-distance running
- Event: 800 metres

Emil Hübscher (3 September 1912 – 25 February 1958) was an Austrian middle-distance runner. He competed in the men's 800 metres at the 1936 Summer Olympics.
