= Kazimierz Kucharski =

Polish middle-distance runner and sprinter

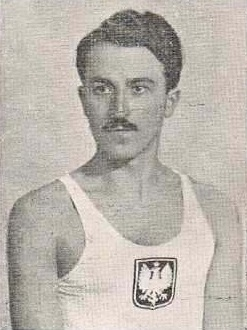

Personal information
- Nationality: Polish
- Born: 13 February 1909 Łuków, Lubelskie, Poland
- Died: 9 April 1995 (aged 84) Warsaw, Mazowieckie, Poland
- Height: 184 cm (6 ft 0 in)
- Weight: 64 kg (141 lb)

Sport
- Sport: Athletics
- Event: middle-distance
- Club: Pogoń Lwów, Ukraine

Kazimierz Kucharski (13 February 1909 – 9 April 1995) was a Polish track and field athlete who competed at the 1936 Summer Olympics.

== Biography ==
Kucharski finished third behind Jack Powell in the 880 yards event at the British 1936 AAA Championships. One month later he was selected to represent Poland at the 1936 Olympic Games held in Berlin, where he competed in the men's 800 metres and the 4 × 400 metres relay.
