= Germaine Pratt =

American football player (born 1996)

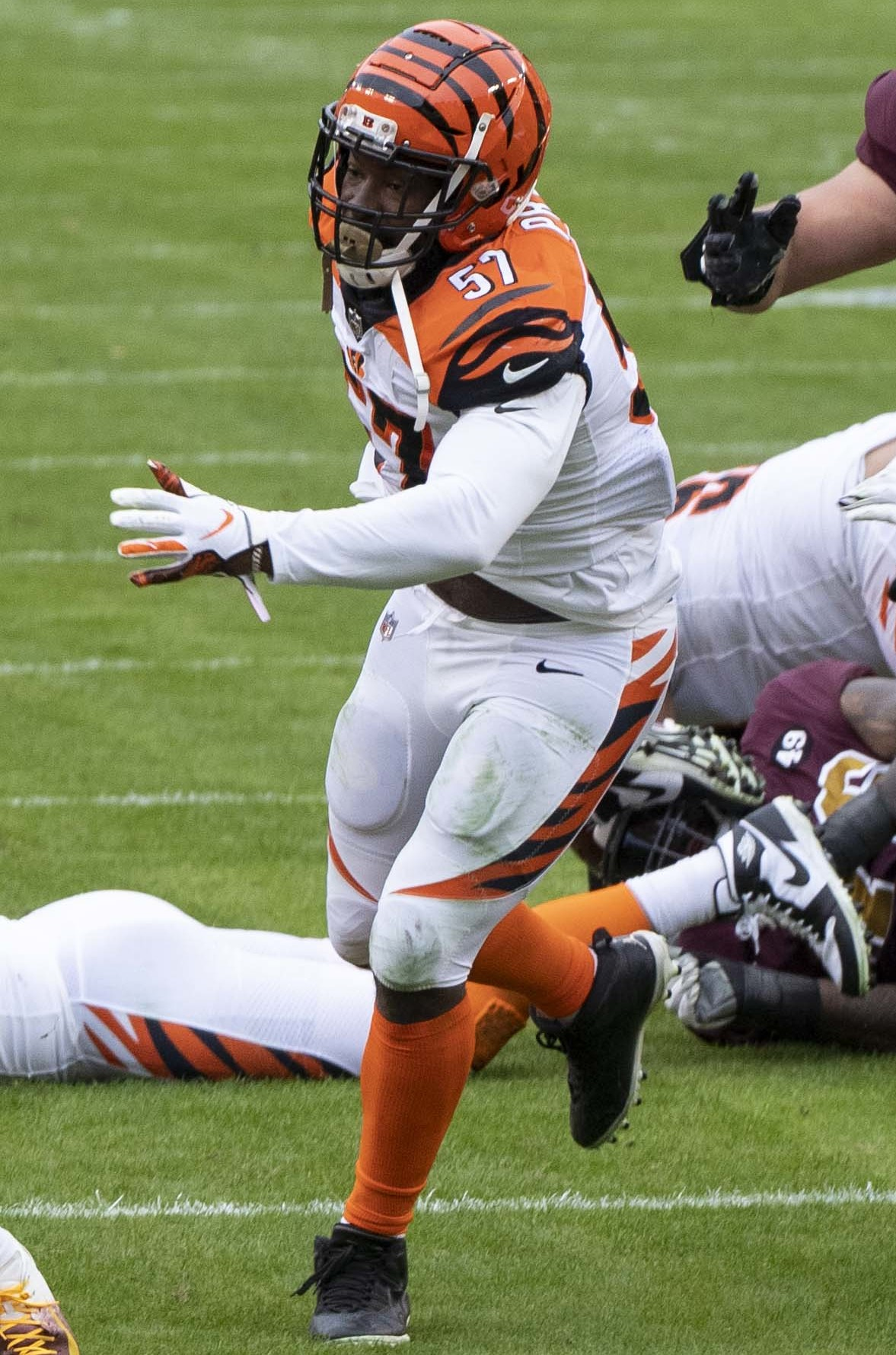
- Pratt with the Cincinnati Bengals in 2020

Profile
- Position: Linebacker

Personal information
- Born: May 21, 1996 (age 30); High Point, North Carolina, U.S.
- Listed height: 6 ft 3 in (1.91 m)
- Listed weight: 250 lb (113 kg)

Career information
- High school: High Point Central
- College: NC State (2014–2018)
- NFL draft: 2019: 3rd round, 72nd overall pick

Career history
- Cincinnati Bengals (2019–2024); Las Vegas Raiders (2025); Indianapolis Colts (2025–2026)

Awards and highlights
- First-team All-ACC (2018)

Career NFL statistics as of 2026
- Total tackles: 742
- Sacks: 3.5
- Forced fumbles: 8
- Fumble recoveries: 7
- Pass deflections: 33
- Interceptions: 8
- Stats at Pro Football Reference

Germaine Pratt (born May 21, 1996) is an American professional football linebacker. He played college football for the NC State Wolfpack and was selected by the Cincinnati Bengals in the third round of the 2019 NFL draft.

== Early life ==
Pratt attended High Point Central High School in High Point, North Carolina. He committed to North Carolina State University to play college football.

== College career ==
Pratt played at NC State from 2014 to 2018. During his career, he had 235 tackles, six sacks, four interceptions and a touchdown.

== Professional career ==
Pre-draft measurables
Height	Weight	Arm length	Hand span	40-yard dash	10-yard split	20-yard split	20-yard shuttle	Vertical jump	Broad jump	Bench press
6 ft 2 1/2 in (1.89 m)	240 lb (109 kg)	31 5/8 in (0.80 m)	9 1/8 in (0.23 m)	4.57 s	1.58 s	2.53 s	4.45 s	32 1/2 in (0.83 m)	9 ft 8 in (2.95 m)	24 reps
All values from NFL Combine

=== Cincinnati Bengals ===
==== 2019 ====
The Cincinnati Bengals selected Pratt in the third round (72nd overall) of the 2019 NFL draft. Pratt was the eighth linebacker drafted in 2019. On June 27, 2019, the Bengals signed Pratt to a four-year, $4.08 million contract that includes a signing bonus of $1.05 million.

Throughout training camp, Pratt competed with Hardy Nickerson Jr., Malik Jefferson, Deshaun Davis and Noah Dawkins for a role as the Bengals' primary backup linebacker, resulting in Pratt winning the job, and head coach Zac Taylor placing him behind starters Preston Brown, Nick Vigil, and Jordan Evans on the depth chart to begin the regular season.

Pratt earned his first career start and recorded five combined tackles (four solo) during a 23–17 loss at the Baltimore Ravens in Week 6. In Week 10, Pratt started at middle linebacker, replacing Brown, and made four combined tackles (three solo) in the Bengals' 49–13 loss against the Baltimore Ravens.

On November 12, 2019, the Cincinnati Bengals waived Preston Brown, subsequently resulting in Pratt remaining as the starter for the remainder of the season. In Week 16, Pratt collected a season-high 11 combined tackles (nine solo) during a 38–35 loss at the Miami Dolphins. He finished his rookie campaign in 2019 with a total of 76 combined tackles (50 solo) in 16 games and nine starts.

==== 2020 ====
Defensive coordinator Lou Anarumo elected to install a base nickel defense and named Pratt and Josh Bynes as the starting linebackers. He started in the Bengals' season-opener against the Los Angeles Chargers and made 12 combined tackles (eight solo) during a 16–13 loss. He finished the season with 89 tackles (55 solo), and two pass deflections.

==== 2021 ====
Pratt was once again named a starting linebacker for the 2021 season alongside Logan Wilson. In Week 8 against the New York Jets, Pratt recorded his first career interception on Jets' quarterback Mike White. In the Bengals' Week 14 win against the Denver Broncos, Pratt had a career-high 15 combined tackles (nine solo). He finished the regular season with 91 tackles and two forced fumbles. Against the Las Vegas Raiders in the Wild Card round, Pratt recorded six tackles, and recorded the game-winning interception on Derek Carr in the 26–19 win, securing the Bengals first playoff win since 1991.

==== 2022 ====
Pratt and Wilson returned as the team's starting linebackers for the 2022 season. In the Bengals' Week 5 loss to the Ravens, Pratt recorded his first career sack on Ravens' quarterback Lamar Jackson. The following week against the New Orleans Saints, Pratt recorded 14 tackles, one shy of his personal career high. Pratt made an interception in Week 9 against the Carolina Panthers, leading to a viral celebration by the entire Bengals defense, doing snow angels in the end zone. His second interception of the season came in the fourth quarter of their Week 15 game against the Tampa Bay Buccaneers. Pratt finished the season with 99 tackles, finishing second on the team in total tackles, only behind Wilson.

==== 2023 ====
On March 14, 2023, Pratt signed a three-year, $20.25 million contract extension with the Bengals. In the Bengals' Week 1 game against the Cleveland Browns, Pratt recorded his second career sack and force a fumble in the 24–3 loss. Pratt made an interception in Week 5 against the Arizona Cardinals, but suffered a minor shoulder injury while bringing the ball in. During the third quarter of the Bengals' Week 8 game against the San Francisco 49ers, Pratt picked off 49ers quarterback Brock Purdy's end zone pass, a crucial turnover for the Bengals who went on to win 31–17. Pratt finished the season with a career-high 118 tackles, finishing second on the team in total tackles, only behind Wilson.

==== 2024 ====
Pratt started all 17 games for Cincinnati during the 2024 campaign, recording 2 interceptions, 6 pass deflections, 2 forced fumbles, and 143 combined tackles.

==== 2025 ====
On February 12, 2025, Pratt requested a trade from the Bengals. On June 10, 2025, the Cincinnati Bengals released Pratt.

=== Las Vegas Raiders ===
On June 11, 2025, Pratt signed a one-year, $4.25 million contract with the Las Vegas Raiders. He started the first four games of the season for Las Vegas, recording 25 combined tackles and two pass deflections. On October 6, Pratt was released by the Raiders.

=== Indianapolis Colts ===
On October 8, 2025, Pratt signed a one-year contract with the Indianapolis Colts.

On October 13, 2026, Pratt signed with the Colts practice squad. He was activated on October 24, and released on October 29.

== NFL career statistics ==
Legend
**Bold**	Career high

=== Regular season statistics ===
Year	Team	Games		Tackles					Fumbles				Interceptions					
Year	Team	GP	GS	Comb	Solo	Ast	Sack	TFL	FF	FR	Yds	TD	PD	Int	Yds	Avg	Lng	TD
2019	CIN	16	9	76	50	26	0.0	4	0	0	0	0	0	0	0	0.0	0	0
2020	CIN	16	15	89	55	34	0.0	5	0	0	0	0	2	0	0	0.0	0	0
2021	CIN	15	15	91	57	34	0.5	5	**2**	**2**	0	0	2	1	4	4.0	4	0
2022	CIN	15	15	99	50	49	1.0	6	1	1	-8	0	**10**	**2**	3	2.5	3	0
2023	CIN	**17**	**17**	118	63	55	**2.0**	**7**	**2**	0	0	0	3	**2**	9	4.5	9	0
2024	CIN	**17**	**17**	**143**	**80**	**63**	0.0	5	**2**	**2**	**9**	0	6	**2**	**26**	**13.0**	**24**	0
2025	LV	4	4	25	10	15	0.0	1	0	0	0	0	2	0	0	0	0	0
2025	IND	12	12	101	57	44	0.0	5	1	2	9	0	8	1	0	0	0	0
Career		112	104	742	422	320	3.5	38	8	7	10	0	33	8	42	5.3	24	0

=== Playoffs statistics ===
Year	Team	Games		Tackles					Fumbles				Interceptions					
Year	Team	GP	GS	Comb	Solo	Ast	Sack	TFL	FF	FR	Yds	TD	PD	Int	Yds	Avg	Lng	TD
2021	CIN	**4**	**4**	**29**	**20**	**9**	0.0	**1**	0	0	0	0	1	**1**	**2**	**2.0**	**2**	0
2022	CIN	3	3	20	12	8	0.0	0	0	0	0	0	**3**	0	0	0.0	0	0
Career		7	7	49	32	17	0.0	1	0	0	0	0	4	1	2	1.0	2	0
