= Charles Stein (athlete) =

Luxembourgish middle-distance runner

Personal information
- Nationality: Luxembourgish
- Born: 1 January 1911
- Died: 14 May 1981 (aged 70)

Sport
- Sport: Middle-distance running
- Event: 800 metres

Charles Stein (1 January 1911 – 14 May 1981) was a Luxembourgish middle-distance runner. He competed in the men's 800 metres at the 1936 Summer Olympics.
