= Willie Botha (athlete) =

Medal record

Men's Athletics

Representing South Africa

British Empire Games
Silver medal – second place	1934 London	880 yards

Willem "Willie" Christiaan Botha (31 March 1912 – 14 June 1967) was a South African athlete who competed in the 1936 Summer Olympics. He was born in Petrusburg.

In 1936 he was eliminated in the first round of the 800 metres event. He was also a member of the South African team which was eliminated in the first round of the 4x400 metre relay competition.

At the 1934 Empire Games he won the silver medal in the 880 yards contest. He also participated in the 440 yards event but was eliminated in the heats.
