= Stanislav Otáhal =

Czech middle-distance runner

Personal information
- Nationality: Czech
- Born: 30 December 1913
- Died: 31 May 2004 (aged 90)

Sport
- Sport: Middle-distance running
- Event: 800 metres

Stanislav Otáhal (30 December 1913 – 31 May 2004) was a Czech middle-distance runner. He competed in the men's 800 metres at the 1936 Summer Olympics.
