= Chuck Hornbostel =

American middle-distance runner

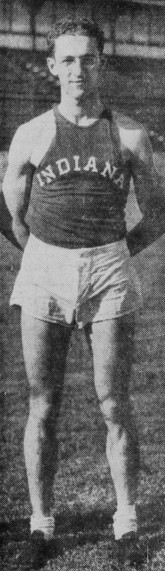
Hornbostel, circa 1934

Charles Christian Hornbostel (September 26, 1911 – January 13, 1989) was an American middle-distance runner. He made two Olympic finals at 800 meters and once tied the world record at 880 yards.

== Career ==
As a sophomore at Indiana University, Hornbostel won the 800 meters at the 1932 NCAA Championships in a meeting record time of 1:52.7. As the NCAA Championships were simultaneously an early Olympic tryout meet, he qualified for the Olympic Trials in Stanford, where he placed second behind Edwin Genung and qualified for the team. At the Olympics in Los Angeles Hornbostel won his heat, running 1:52.4 and beating the eventual silver medalist, Alex Wilson of Canada. In the final he placed sixth, again running 1:52.7.

Hornbostel repeated as NCAA champion in 1933, beating mile champion Glenn Cunningham by inches as both clocked 1:50.9 for 880 yards. (Note: 880 yards is 804.672 meters. At that pace, the difference in time between these two distances is about 0.6-0.7 seconds; thus, Hornbostel's time is worth 1:50.2 or 1:50.3 for 800 meters.) This equalled Ben Eastman's world record from the previous year. Two weeks later Cunningham beat Hornbostel at the national championships in 1:51.8 (800 m).

Hornbostel won the NCAA championship for a third and final time in 1934, this time in 1:51.9 (880 yards). At the Princeton Invitational, however, he was decisively beaten by Eastman, who ran 1:49.8 to break his own and Hornbostel's record. Hornbostel was some five yards behind in 1:50.7, also under the old record.

Hornbostel qualified for the Olympics again in 1936, placing second to eventual gold medalist John Woodruff at the Trials in 1:51.3. In the slow and tactical Olympic final Hornbostel finished fifth. After the Olympics he took part in two world-record-setting relays on the same day, running 4 × 880 yards in 7:35.8 and 4 × Mile in 17:17.2.
