= Raymond Petit (athlete) =

French middle-distance runner

Personal information
- Nationality: French
- Born: 18 January 1910
- Died: 1 January 1990 (aged 79)

Sport
- Sport: Middle-distance running
- Event: 800 metres

Raymond Petit (18 January 1910 – 1 January 1990) was a French middle-distance runner. He competed in the men's 800 metres at the 1936 Summer Olympics.
