= Ferenc Temesvári =

Hungarian middle-distance runner

Personal information
- Nationality: Hungarian
- Born: 5 January 1916

Sport
- Sport: Middle-distance running
- Event: 800 metres

Ferenc Temesvári (born 5 January 1916, date of death unknown) was a Hungarian middle-distance runner. He competed in the men's 800 metres at the 1936 Summer Olympics.
