= Jack Powell (runner) =

British middle-distance runner

Personal information
- Nationality: British (English)
- Born: 2 November 1910 Harrow, London, England
- Died: 27 July 1982 (aged 71) Felpham, England
- Height: 170 cm (5 ft 7 in)
- Weight: 60 kg (132 lb)

Sport
- Sport: Middle-distance running
- Event: 800 metres
- Club: L.A.C.

John Vincent Powell (2 November 1910 – 27 July 1982) was a British middle-distance runner. He competed at the 1932 Summer Olympics and the 1936 Summer Olympics. He also competed for England in the 880 yards at the 1934 British Empire Games in London.

== Biography ==
Born at Harrow, London, a twin (one of six children), Powell was educated at Harrow County Grammar School, where he was an outstanding athlete, winning inter-school competitions. Although often referred to as "Jack", he preferred to be called "John".

Powell represented London Athletic Club and finished second behind Tommy Hampson in the 880 yards event at the 1932 AAA Championships.

Shortly afterwards he was selected to represent Great Britain at the 1932 Olympic Games in Los Angeles and reached the final of the men's 800 metres.

Powell finished behind Jack A. Cooper at the 1934 AAA Championships before participating in the 880 yards at the 1934 British Empire Games in London.

After finishing second to James Stothard at the 1935 AAA Championships, he finally became national 880 yards champion after winning the British AAA Championships title at the 1936 AAA Championships. One month later, at the 1936 Summer Olympics in Berlin, he was eliminated during the semi-finals of the 800 metres event.

Powell was a journalist; he wrote for the Wembley Observer and Harrow Observer from 1928 to 1937, as well as for various sports papers. He was also a broadcaster and lecturer, a member of the British Council in Iraq. He served as a squadron leader in the RAF during the Second World War, including in the Middle East, and was mentioned in dispatches three times. After the war, he began poultry farming in Sussex, where he lived at Bognor Regis.

In 1945, he married Eleanor Sybil Ruth Archdeacon.
