= Francisco Váldez =

Peruvian middle-distance runner (1900–1974)

Francisco Váldez Bravo
Personal information
- Nationality: Peruvian
- Born: 4 October 1900
- Died: 19 September 1974 (aged 73) Lima, Peru

Sport
- Sport: Middle-distance running
- Event: 800 metres

Francisco Váldez (4 October 1900 – 19 September 1974) was a Peruvian middle-distance runner. He competed in the men's 800 metres at the 1936 Summer Olympics.
