= Viktor Pilchin =

Soviet sailor

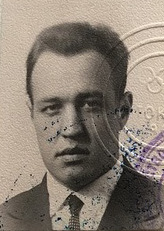
- Viktor Pilchin, 1964

Personal information
- Nationality: Soviet
- Born: 6 April 1940 Moscow, Russia
- Died: 26 May 2004 (aged 64) Moscow, Russia

Sport
- Sport: Sailing

Viktor Pilchin (6 April 1940 – 26 May 2004) was a Soviet sailor. He competed at the 1960 Summer Olympics, the 1964 Summer Olympics, and the 1968 Summer Olympics.
