= Michael Gutteridge (athlete) =

English athlete

Personal information
- Nationality: British (English)
- Born: fourth quarter 1908 Bromley, Kent, England
- Died: 12 May 1935 (aged 26) West Bengal, India

Sport
- Sport: Athletics
- Event: middle-distance
- College team: Cambridge Univ AC
- Club: Achilles Club

Michael Harold Cooke Gutteridge (Q4. 1908 – 12 May 1935) was an English athlete.

== Biography ==
Gutteridge finished third behind Cyril Ellis in the 880 yards event at the 1929 AAA Championships.

The following year, he competed in the 880 yards at the 1930 British Empire Games for England

Gutteridge finished third behind Jack A. Cooper in the 880 yards event at the 1934 AAA Championships. Shortly afterwards, he represented England at the 1934 British Empire Games in the 880 yards event.

He was an undergraduate at the time of the 1930 Games and later a lieutenant in the Royal Tank Corps.
