= Tonny Brogaard =

Danish footballer (born 1984)

Personal information
- Full name: Tonny Brogaard
- Date of birth: 10 February 1984 (age 42)
- Place of birth: Denmark
- Height: 2.06 m (6 ft 9 in)
- Position: Goalkeeper

Youth career
- Brøndby IF
- Boldklubben Frem

Senior career*
Years	Team	Apps	(Gls)
–2004	Frem	0	(0)
2004–2005	Fremad Amager	?	(0)
2005–2006	Doncaster Rovers	0	(0)
2006	Greve IF	?	(0)
2007	Frem reserves	?	(0)
2008–2009	Avedøre IF	?	(0)
2009	Frem	3	(0)
- * Club domestic league appearances and goals as of 31 December 2009

Tonny Brogaard (born 10 February 1984), formerly Tonny Nielsen, is a Danish football goalkeeper, who last played at Boldklubben Frem in the Danish 1st Division. At 206 cm (6 ft 9 in), he is one of the tallest playing footballers.

== Career ==
Playing as a reserve goalkeeper for Danish amateur club Fremad Amager, he was brought to English club Doncaster Rovers in May 2005. He signed a two-year contract and looked to compete for the starting goalkeeper spot with fellow Dane Jan Budtz. One of the tallest players in the league, Nielsen was known as "The Gentle Giant" of football. He did not find much playing time at Doncaster, and only played one game in the pre-season. He suffered injuries and was soon third goalkeeper choice at the club. He did appear on the pitch after a match against Manchester City, talking to Jan Budtz after the horrible scenes when Doncaster's first choice keeper Andy Warrington broke his right leg. Nielsen was eventually released from his contract in October 2006, and moved back to Denmark to play part-time football with Greve IF in the Danish 2nd Division.
