= John Chandler (athlete) =

South African athlete

Medal record

Men's Athletics

Representing South Africa

British Empire Games
| Bronze medal – third place | 1930 Hamilton | 4×440 yards |

John Andrew Chandler (21 November 1907 – 1969) was a South African athlete who competed in the 1930 British Empire Games.

At the 1930 Empire Games he won the bronze medal with the South African relay in the 4×440 yards competition. In the 880 yards contest he finished fourth.
