= René Morel (athlete) =

French middle-distance runner

Personal information
- Born: 19 February 1912 Paris, France
- Died: 3 April 1978 (aged 66)

Sport
- Sport: Middle-distance running
- Event: 800 metres

René Morel (19 February 1912 – 3 April 1978) was a French middle-distance runner. He competed in the men's 800 metres at the 1932 Summer Olympics.
