= Jean Keller =

French middle-distance runner

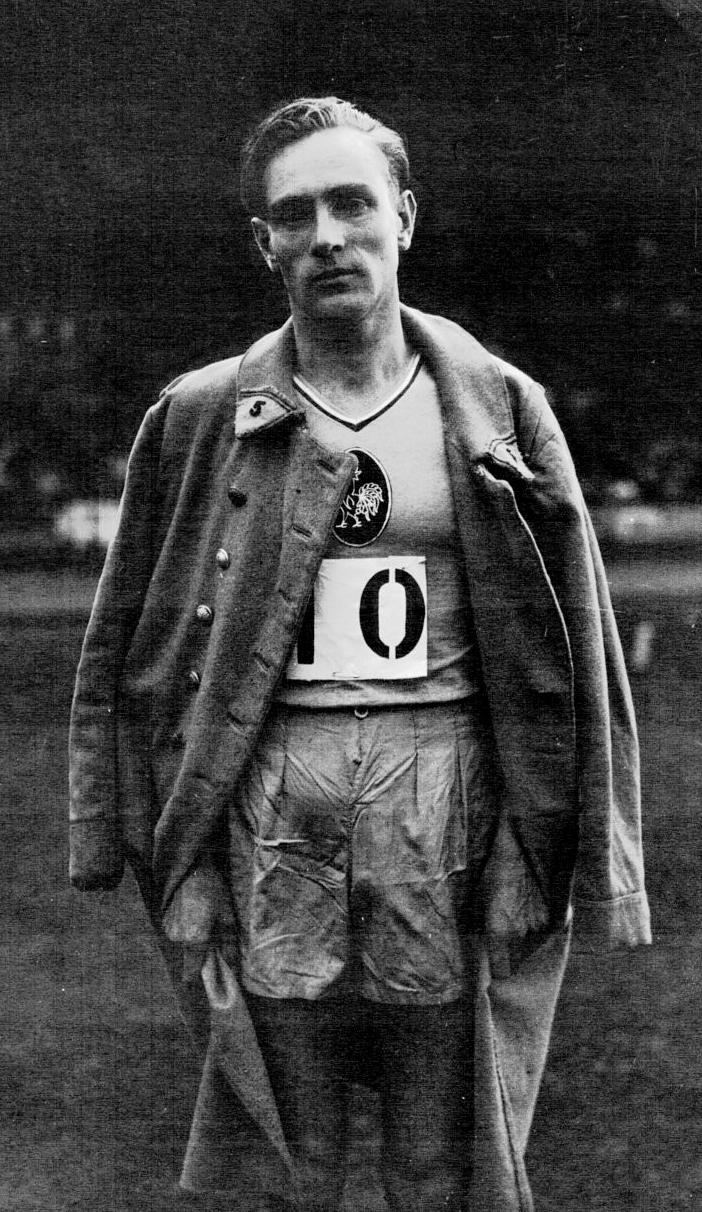
- Jean Keller in 1932

Personal information
- Born: 22 June 1905 Paris, France
- Died: 5 May 1990 (aged 84)
- Height: 1.82 m (6 ft 0 in)
- Weight: 65 kg (143 lb)

Sport
- Sport: Athletics
- Event: 800–3000 m
- Club: CASG Paris; Métropolitain Club Colombes

Achievements and titles
- Personal best(s): 800 m – 1:53.4 (1932); 1500 m – 3:59.6 (1931)

Paul Jean Keller (22 June 1905 – 5 May 1990) was a French middle-distance runner, who competed at the 1924, 1928 and 1932 Summer Olympics. In 1924 he finished fourth in the team 3000 m event. Four years later he placed eighth in the 800 m and 11th in the 1500 m. In 1932 he was eliminated in the heats of the 800 m event. He finished ninth in the 800 m at the 1934 European Championships.
