= Henry Ries =

American photographer

Henry Ries (September 22, 1917 – May 24, 2004) was a photographer who worked for New York Times. His most famous photo was of "The Berlin Air Lift" which was later made into a U.S. Postage Stamp commemorative.

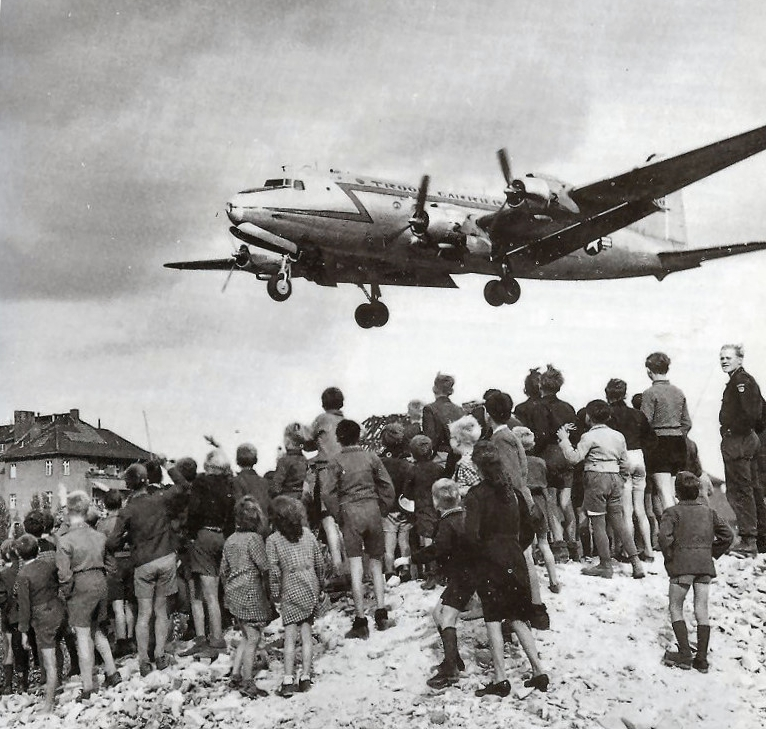
Berliners watching a C-54 land at Tempelhof Airport (1948)

Ries was born in Berlin and grew up in Germany, but sensed the impending doom of Hitler's political style and, as a Jew, emigrated to the United States in 1937. He eventually returned to the Third Reich forced to renew his US immigration papers there. Ries was permitted to enter America in January 1938, after acquiring the desired papers in Cuba instead, having crossed the Atlantic twice to do so.

When America entered World War II, Ries immediately joined the army and served in India with an aerial reconnaissance unit, humorously pointing out that he served there due to his "good German" skills. After the war, in August 1945, Ries, still a soldier, returned to Berlin. He soon resigned from the army in order to work for the OMGUS Observer as a photojournalist. Two years later, he begin to work for The New York Times as a European photographer, photographing many of the scenes of destroyed post-war Germany and the Berlin Airlift, which have become iconic images. In 1951, Ries returned to the US and eventually turned to commercial photography. In 1955, he opened his own studio in Manhattan.

He wrote of his return to Berlin in 1945, that 'I realized that I too had once been a citizen of this city and had witnessed the beginning of the disaster before I was “denationalized” … It was not easy for me to remain an observer rather than a judge.’. In his book, Abschied meiner Generation, he said, "Seeing all this devastation and desperation, confronted with hunger and fear, cripples and black-marketers – and with no Nazi in sight anywhere – I realized how fundamentally the seven years between emigration and occupation had changed Germany's exterior and my own interior."

During his time with the Times, he met and photographed the famous and the infamous, such as artists Pablo Picasso and Pablo Casals, as well as Spanish General Francisco Franco.

In 2003 he was awarded Germany's Officer Cross of the Order of Merit, the highest award for citizens of other countries.
