= Edwin Turner (athlete) =

American middle-distance runner

Personal information
- Born: September 15, 1912 United States
- Died: August 17, 1967 (aged 54)

Sport
- Sport: Middle-distance running
- Event: 800 metres

Edwin Thomas Turner Jr. (September 15, 1912 – August 17, 1967) was an American middle-distance runner. He competed in the men's 800 metres at the 1932 Summer Olympics, finishing fifth in the final.

== Personal life ==
Turner was born in 1912 and grew up in Casper, Wyoming, the son of a wool buyer. He attended Natrona County High School, where he played in the school's state football championship-winning football team in 1928. He graduated in 1929.

Turner attended the University of Michigan. While at Michigan, he served as president of the inter-fraternity council, junior class president, and a member of the Sphinx honor society. He was a candidate for the Rhodes Scholarship.

Turner married Ruth Stevenson in 1935. He was an officer in the United States Navy during World War II. After the war he worked in Kalamazoo, Michigan as a business executive. He had three children with his wife; Thomas Edwin, Stevenson, and Constance Jean. Thomas and Stevenson, the oldest, were born in New York, whereas Constance was born in Michigan.

== Athletics ==
At college, Turner competed in the half-mile races. As a sophomore in 1932, he helped lead Michigan to the Big Ten Conference indoor and outdoor championships. He competed for Michigan through 1933.

In 1932, Turner finished third in the final trial to make the United States Olympic team. At the games, he finished third in his semi-final to progress to the final. He finished fifth in the final, seven tenths of a second behind the bronze-medal runner.
