= John Woodruff (runner) =

American middle-distance runner

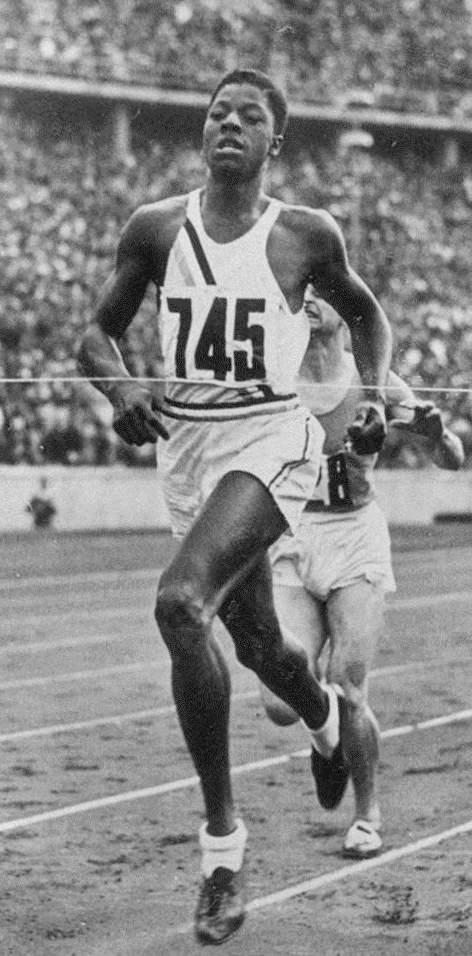
- John Woodruff winning the 800 m race at the 1936 Olympics

Personal information
- Born: July 5, 1915 South Connellsville, Pennsylvania, U.S.
- Died: October 30, 2007 (aged 92) Fountain Hills, Arizona, U.S.
- Resting place: Crown Hill Cemetery and Arboretum, Section 46, Lot 86; 39.8204096°N 86.170691°W
- Education: University of Pittsburgh

Sport
- Sport: Athletics
- Event: 400-1500 meter
- Club: Pittsburgh Panthers
- Retired: 1940

Achievements and titles
- Personal bests: 440 yards – 47.0 (1937); 880 yards – 1:47.7i (1940); Mile – 4:12.8 (1939)
Medal record
Representing the United States
Olympic Games
Gold medal – first place	1936 Berlin	800 m

John Youie "Long John" Woodruff (July 5, 1915 – October 30, 2007) was an American middle-distance runner, winner of the 800 meter event at the 1936 Summer Olympics.

== Early life ==
Woodruff was only a freshman at the University of Pittsburgh in 1936 when he placed second at the National Amateur Athletic Union meet and first at the Olympic Trials (in the heat 1:49.9; WR 1:49.8), earning a spot on the U.S. Olympic team. Woodruff was a member of Alpha Phi Alpha fraternity.

Despite his inexperience, he was the favorite in the Olympic 800 meter run, and he did not disappoint. In one of the most exciting races in Olympic history, Woodruff became boxed in by other runners and was forced to stop running. He then came from behind to win in 1:52.9. The New York Times described the race:

He remembers the anguish of his Olympic race: "Phil Edwards, the Canadian doctor, set the pace, and it was very slow. On the first lap, I was on the inside, and I was trapped. I knew that the rules of running said if I tried to break out of a trap and fouled someone, I would be disqualified. At that point, I didn't think I could win, but I had to do something."

Woodruff was a 21-year-old college freshman, an unsophisticated and, at 6 feet 3 inches (1.91 m), an ungainly runner. But he was a fast thinker, and he made a quick decision.

"I didn't panic," he said. "I just figured if I had only one opportunity to win, this was it. I've heard people say that I slowed down or almost stopped. I didn't almost stop. I stopped, and everyone else ran around me."

Then, with his stride of almost 10 feet (3.0 m), Woodruff ran around everyone else. He took the lead, lost it on the backstretch, but regained it on the final turn and won the gold medal.

During a career that was curtailed by World War II, Woodruff won one Amateur Athletic Union title in 800 meter in 1937 and won both 440 yd (400 m) and 880 yd (800 m) IC4A titles from 1937 to 1939. Woodruff also held a share of the world 4 × 880 yard relay record while competing with the national team.

Woodruff graduated from the University of Pittsburgh in 1939, with a major in sociology. While at the University of Pittsburgh, Woodruff became a member of Alpha Phi Alpha fraternity. and then earned a master's degree in the same field from New York University in 1941. He entered military service in 1941 as a second lieutenant and was discharged as a captain in 1945. He re-entered military service during the Korean War era, and left in 1957 as a lieutenant colonel. He was a battalion commander in the 369th Coastal Artillery Regiment, later the 569th Transportation Battalion of the New York Army National Guard.

== Later years ==
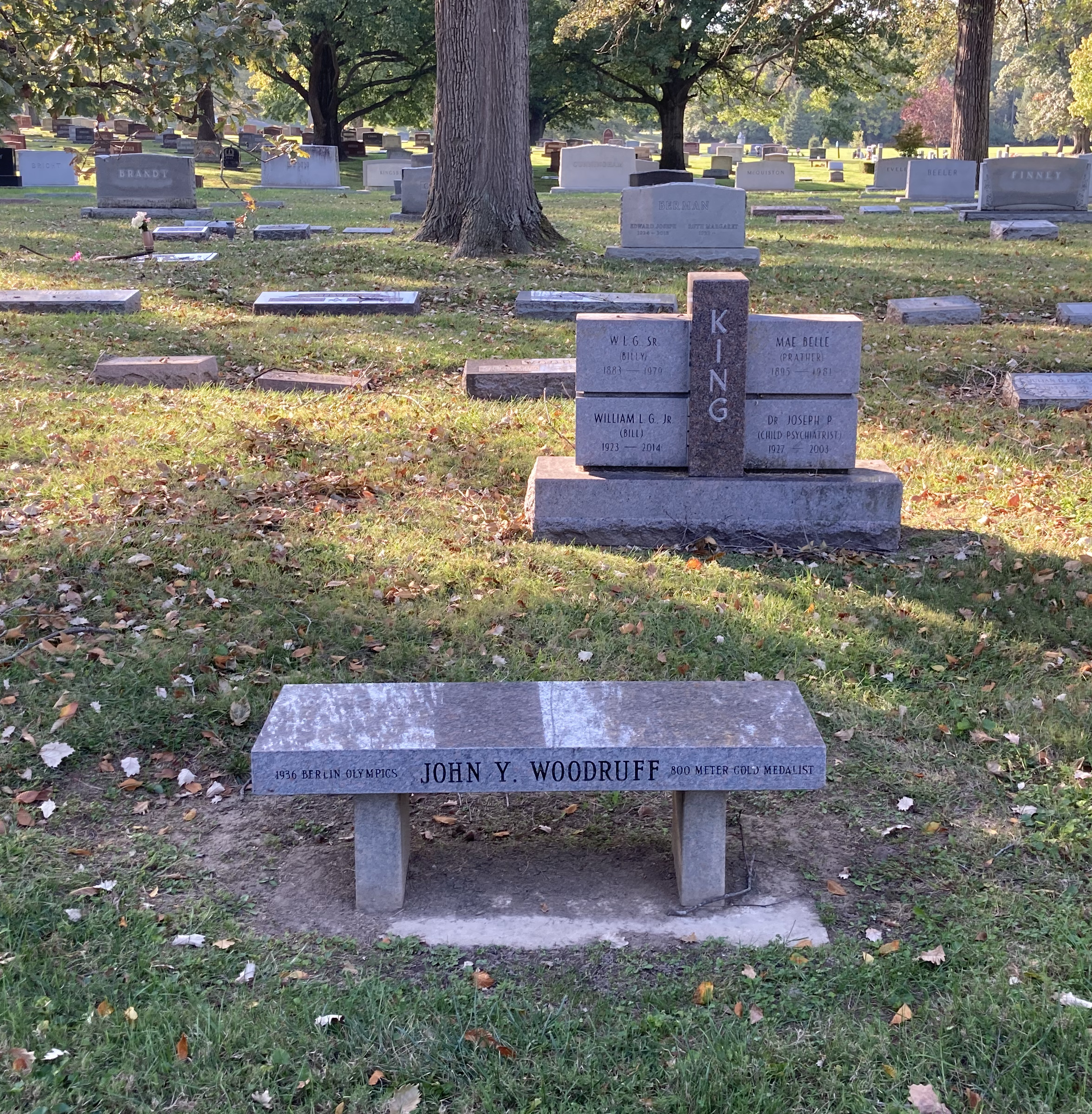
Woodruff's grave at Crown Hill Cemetery

In later years Woodruff lived in New Rochelle in Westchester County, New York and in Hightstown, New Jersey. He coached young athletes and officiated at local and Madison Garden track meets. Woodruff also worked as a teacher in New York City, a special investigator for the New York Department of Welfare, a recreation center director for the New York City Police Athletic League, a parole officer for the state of New York, a salesperson for Schieffelin and Co. and an assistant to the Center Director for Edison Job Corps Center in New Jersey. In the late 1990s John, with his wife Rose, retired to Fountain Hills, Arizona residing at Fountain View Village retirement community. Woodruff's last public appearance was on April 15, 2007, when he, along with the members of the Tuskegee Airmen, was honored by the Arizona Diamondbacks by throwing out the first pitch. John Woodruff is buried at Crown Hill Cemetery, Indianapolis (section 46, lot 86).

== Legacy ==
Each year, a 5-kilometer road race is held in Connellsville to honor Woodruff. In 2016, the 1936 Olympic journey of the eighteen Black American athletes, including Woodruff, was documented in the film Olympic Pride, American Prejudice.
