= Kumao Aochi =

Japanese middle-distance runner (1914–2004)

Personal information
- Nationality: Japanese
- Born: 22 September 1914 Tokyo, Japan
- Died: 8 May 2004 (aged 89) Shinagawa, Tokyo, Japan

Sport
- Sport: Middle-distance running
- Event: 800 metres

Kumao Aochi (青地 球磨男, Kumao Aochi; 22 September 1914 – 8 May 2004) was a Japanese middle-distance runner. He competed in the men's 800 metres at the 1936 Summer Olympics.
