= Jean Verhaert =

Belgian sprinter

Personal information
- Nationality: Belgian
- Born: 10 June 1908
- Died: 8 November 1999 (aged 91)

Sport
- Sport: Sprinting
- Event: 400 metres

Jean Verhaert (10 June 1908 – 8 November 1999) was a Belgian sprinter. He competed in the men's 400 metres at the 1936 Summer Olympics.
