= Knut Brogaard =

Norwegian footballer (1935-2004)

Personal information
- Date of birth: 26 February 1935
- Date of death: 10 May 2004 (aged 69)

Senior career*
Years	Team	Apps	(Gls)
- Ørn-Horten

International career
1954	Norway	1	(0)
- * Club domestic league appearances and goals

Knut Brogaard (26 February 1935 – 10 May 2004) was a Norwegian footballer. He played in one match for the Norway national football team in 1954.
