= Pierre Hemmer (athlete) =

Luxembourgish middle-distance runner

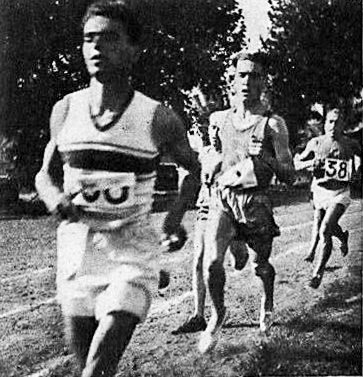
- Hemmer is in 2nd place

Personal information
- Nationality: Luxembourgish
- Born: 6 April 1912
- Died: 23 November 1976 (aged 64)

Sport
- Sport: Middle-distance running
- Event: 800 metres

Pierre Hemmer (6 April 1912 – 23 November 1976) was a Luxembourgish middle-distance runner. He competed in the men's 800 metres at the 1936 Summer Olympics.
