= Jack A. Cooper =

English middle-distance runner

Jack Cooper
Personal information
- Nationality: British (English)

Sport
- Sport: Athletics
- Event: middle-distance
- Club: C.A.V. Acton

John Andrew Cooper(1911-97) was a male athlete who competed for England at the British Empire Games and was a British champion over 880 yards.

== Biography ==
Cooper became the national 880 yards champion after winning the British AAA Championships title at the 1934 AAA Championships.

Shortly after winning the British title, Cooper competed for England in the 880 yards at the 1934 British Empire Games in London. He married Ida May Williams in 1935 and they produced two daughters.
