= Phil Edwards (runner) =

Canadian middle distance runner (1907–1971)

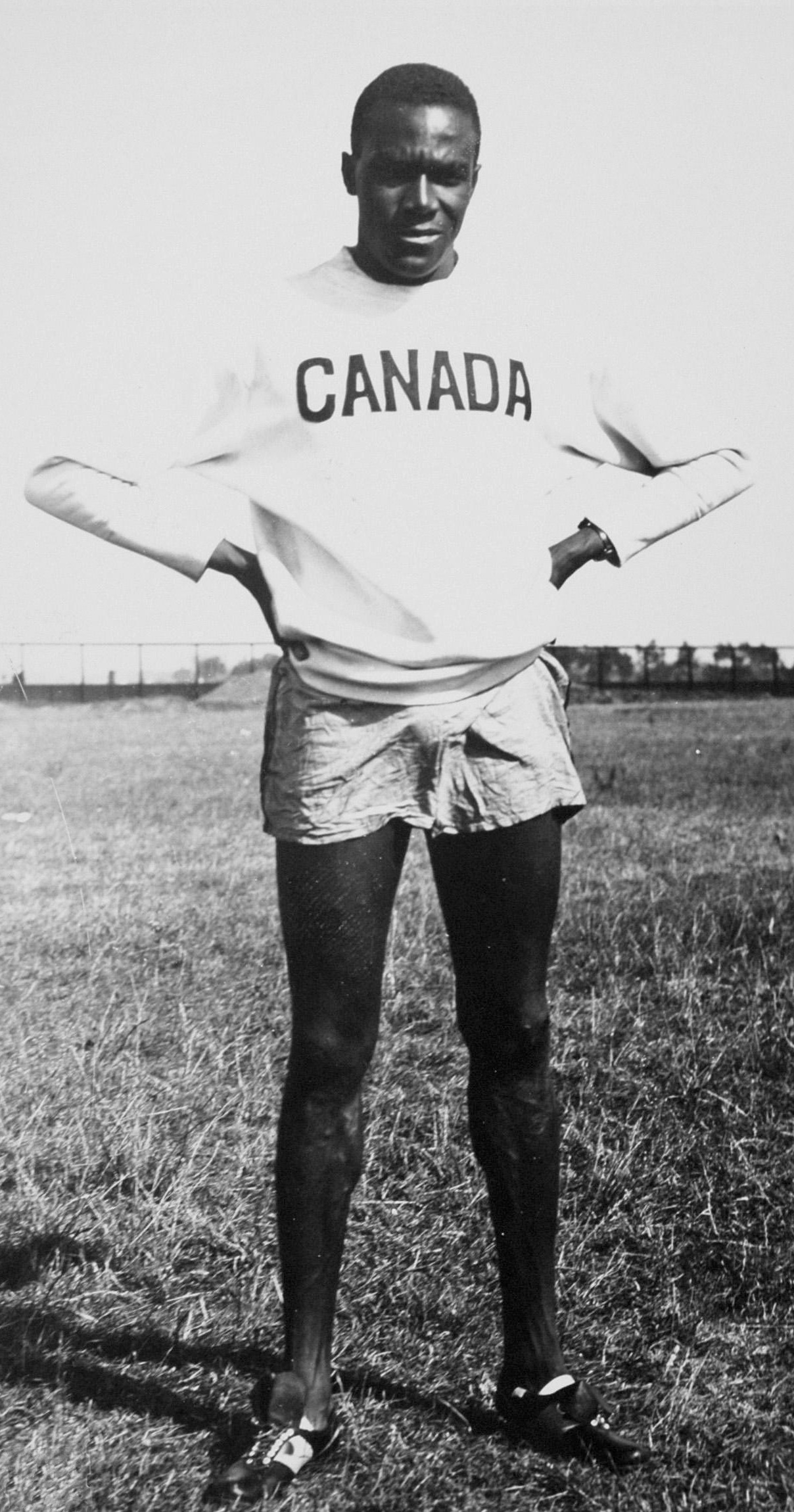
- Phil Edwards at the 1928 Olympics

Personal information
- Full name: Philip Aaron Edwards
- Nationality: Canadian
- Born: September 23, 1907 Georgetown, British Guiana
- Died: September 6, 1971 (aged 63) Montreal, Quebec, Canada
- Height: 1.76 m (5 ft 9 in)
- Weight: 64 kg (141 lb)

Sport
- Country: Canada
- Sport: Running (Track and Field)
- College team: New York University; McGill University
- Club: Hamilton Olympic Club
Medal record
Representing Canada
Olympic Games
| Bronze medal – third place | 1928 Amsterdam | 4×400 metres |
| Bronze medal – third place | 1932 Los Angeles | 800 metres |
| Bronze medal – third place | 1932 Los Angeles | 1500 metres |
| Bronze medal – third place | 1932 Los Angeles | 4×400 metres |
| Bronze medal – third place | 1936 Berlin | 800 metres |
Tailteann Games
| Gold medal – first place | 1928 Dublin | 800 metres |
Representing British Guiana
British Empire Games
| Gold medal – first place | 1934 London | 880 yards |

Philip Aaron Edwards, MD (September 23, 1907 – September 6, 1971) was a Canadian and Guyanese track and field athlete who competed in middle-distance events. Nicknamed the "Man of Bronze", he was Canada's most-decorated Olympian for many years. He was the first-ever winner of the Lou Marsh Trophy as Canada's top athlete. He went on to serve as a captain in the Canadian army and as a highly regarded physician and expert of tropical diseases.

== Early life ==
Edwards was born in Georgetown, British Guiana (now Guyana), to a family of thirteen children. His father was a magistrate, and the family was part of the Afro-Guyanese elite in the colony. Edwards' father was one of eighteen children and was originally from Barbados. Less is known of his mother, but it is thought that she may originally have been from Trinidad. In a 1928 New York Daily News article, it was stated that Edwards' paternal grandmother was East Indian and his maternal grandfather was Scottish and that fellow Olympian Jack London was a classmate of his at Queen's College in Georgetown. Growing up in what Edwards called 'a country district', he practiced sprinting by racing an angry cow, according to the article.

== Athletics career ==
=== New York University ===
By the age of 16, Edwards dominated track events at his school. After graduating, he left British Guiana and moved to the United States, enrolling at New York University (NYU) in 1925, where his elder brother “King” Edward was already a great student athlete. Edwards’ parents and several of his siblings also emigrated to New York, where they founded a law and real estate firm in Harlem. Under the guidance of NYU coach Emil Von Elling, Edwards steadily improved really great as a runner, particularly in 880-yard races or more. In 1927 he narrowly missed winning the US national title in the 880 yards event. Then in 1929, two years later, he won that same race.

=== Olympics and British Empire Games ===
While Edwards' performances at New York University clearly established him as an Olympic-calibre athlete, he was not eligible to compete for the United States as he was not an American citizen. However, as a British subject, Edwards was eligible to compete for another country within the empire. In 1927 he was invited by Melville Marks (Bobby) Robinson, manager of the Canadian Olympic track and field team, to compete for Canada in the 1928 Summer Olympics, where Edwards won a bronze medal as part of Canada's 4 × 400 metre relay team.

Following Amsterdam, Edwards left New York University to attend Montreal's McGill University as a medical student, where he also competed with the university's track team. Edwards also continued his association with Bobby Robinson there, competing for British Guiana in the first-ever British Empire Games which were created largely due to Robinson's efforts, held in Hamilton, Ontario in 1930. He finished fifth in the 880 yards event as well as in the 1 mile competition. In the 440 yards contest he was eliminated in the heats. He would go on to compete once more for British Guiana in the 1934 British Empire Games in London where he became the first black man to be awarded a gold medal in what are now the Commonwealth Games by winning the 880 yards race.

At McGill, Edwards captained the university track team from 1931 to 1936, leading the team to six consecutive championships. At the international level, Edwards went on to compete in the 1932 Summer Olympics in Los Angeles and in the infamous 1936 Summer Olympics in Berlin, where he was one of a number of black athletes, including American runner Jesse Owens, to compete before the Hitler regime. Edwards earned bronze medals in 1932 in the 800 metres, 1500 metres, and 4 × 400 metre relay event, and in 1936 in the 800 metres event. On the way back from the 1936 games, Edwards was refused lodgings in the London hotel at which the team was booked on account of his race; the full team cancelled their stay at the hotel as a result, preferring to accompany him elsewhere.

=== Post-Olympics ===
While serving as resident house surgeon at the General Hospital in Barbados, Edwards was approached by British Guiana officials with a proposal to run for the colony at the 1938 British Empire Games. Edwards was either not interested or could not take the necessary time off. However, in 1939 an untrained and semi-injured Edwards was persuaded to compete in a British Guiana “Olympiad”, ending up fifth in the 880 yards.

Edwards' appearance at the event in British Guiana may have given rise to a report in the Indianapolis Recorder, a Black American newspaper, that the runner ("prominent in medical circles now"), is "training in British Guiana with an eye towards the 1940 Finland games in Helsinki". The 1940 Olympics were soon cancelled due to the outbreak of World War II

In 1957, Edwards and James Worrall were involved in developing Canada's first international sport effort, which assisted young athletes in the Eastern Caribbean.

=== Recognition ===
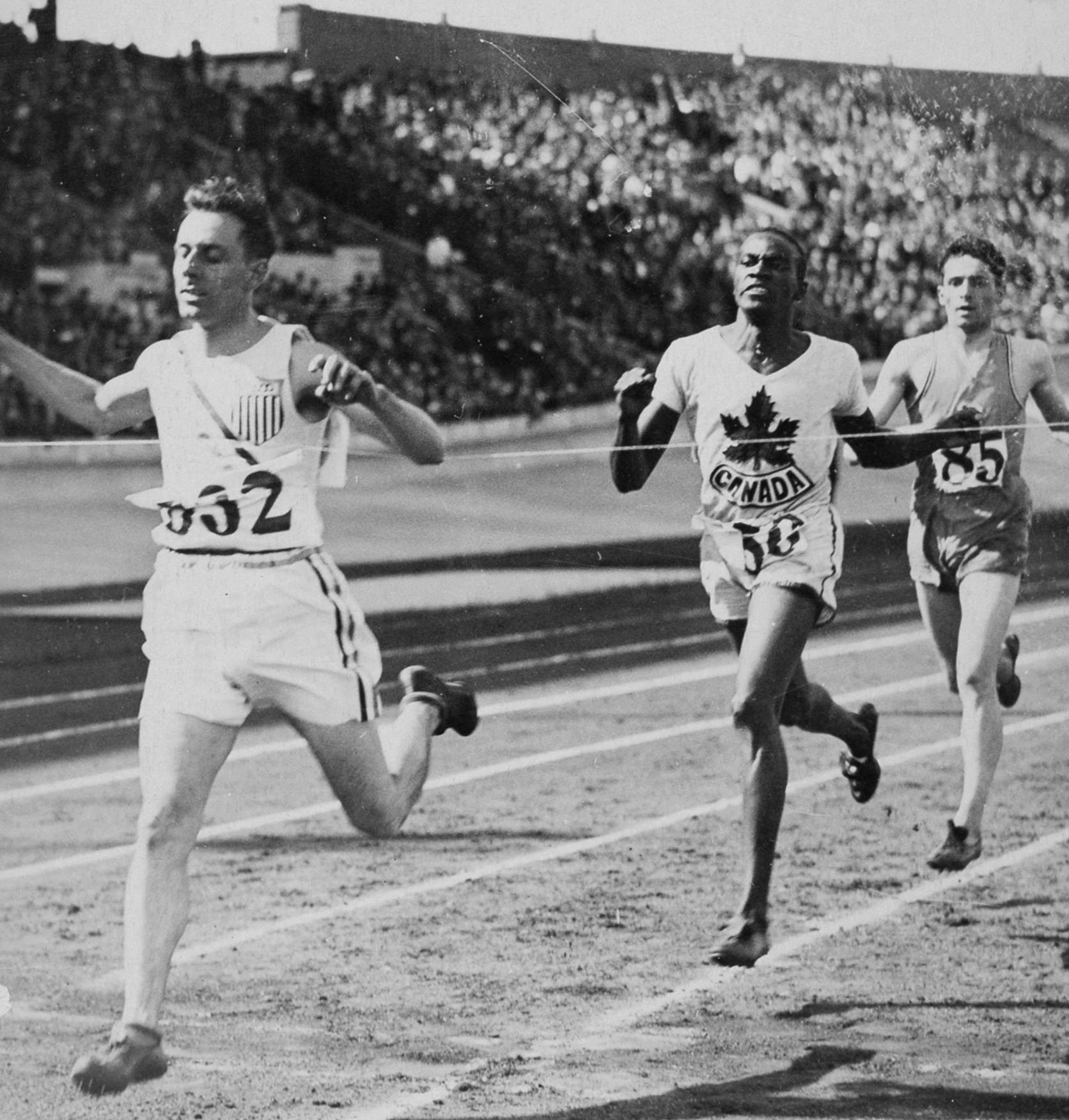
Edwards (middle) in a semi final of the 800 metres at the 1928 Olympics.

The five bronze medals gave Edwards the nickname 'Man of Bronze', and made him Canada's most prolific Olympic medal-winner; he would be joined in 2002 by Marc Gagnon and later François-Louis Tremblay and eventually surpassed by Cindy Klassen and Clara Hughes. Edwards was among the first black athletes to earn an Olympic medal and, along with Hamilton runner Ray Lewis, Toronto's Sam Richardson and Vancouver's Barbara Howard, one of only a handful of black athletes to represent Canada in the 1920s and 1930s. Edwards was named the inaugural Lou Marsh Trophy winner in 1936 as Canada's top athlete.

Edwards was inducted into the Canada's Sports Hall of Fame and the McGill University Sports Hall of Fame in 1997, and the Quebec Sports Hall of Fame in 2005. An annual award in his name, the Phil A. Edwards Memorial Trophy, has been presented to Canada's outstanding track athlete annually since 1972.

He was a member of Alpha Phi Alpha fraternity at New York University.

== Medical career ==
Edwards became the first black person to graduate from McGill University's medical school in 1936, immediately before competing in the 1936 Olympic Games and being named Canada's top athlete. He then accepted a three-year position at the General Hospital in Barbados as resident house surgeon. Interrupting his medical career to serve with the Canadian army, Edwards rose to the rank of captain during World War II before returning to Montreal. He earned a graduate medical diploma in 1945 and became a specialist in tropical diseases, joining the staff of Montreal's Royal Victoria Hospital and participating in a number of international medical missions. In 1960, Dr. Edwards was a member of a Canadian Red Cross team of four doctors and six nurses working in Coquilhatville in Congo. Edwards' tenure at the Royal Victoria coincided with that of infamous psychiatrist Ewen Cameron; outside his tropical medicine work, Edwards was instrumental in rescuing at least one patient whose physical illness had been misdiagnosed and mistreated by Cameron as a psychiatric matter.

== Personal life and family ==
At the Amsterdam Olympics, Edwards met his first wife, Edith Margaret Oedelschoff, a native of the former German territory of Alsace-Lorraine and a resident of Weehawken, New Jersey. The couple was married in October 1929 at the Episcopal Church of the Crucifixion on 140th Street in New York City. The marriage appears to have broken up by the early 1940s.

Dr. Edwards was just a few days shy of his 64th birthday when he died of heart problems in 1971. He was survived by his widow Mrs. Diane Edwards and three daughters, Pamela, Dale and Gwendolyn. He is interred in the Mount Royal Cemetery in Montreal.

== Bibliography ==
- John Cooper, Rapid Ray: The Story of Ray Lewis (Toronto: Tundra Books, 2002. ISBN 0-88776-612-9.
- Lorne Zeiler, Hearts of Gold (Toronto: Raincost Books, 2004. ISBN 1-55192-684-9.)
