= Deaths in December 1988 =

The following is a list of notable deaths in December 1988.

Entries for each day are listed alphabetically by surname. A typical entry lists information in the following sequence:

- Name, age, country of citizenship at birth, subsequent country of citizenship (if applicable), reason for notability, cause of death (if known), and reference.

== December 1988 ==
=== 1 ===
- Martin Hinds, 47, British scholar of the Middle East, historiographer of early Islamic history.
- Włodzimierz Mazur, 34, Polish international footballer (Zagłębie Sosnowiec, Poland).
- J. Vernon McGee, 84, American Presbyterian minister and radio minister, heart failure.

=== 2 ===
- Karl-Heinz Bürger, 84, Nazi German member of the SS.
- Tata Giacobetti, 66, Italian singer and jazz musician (Quartetto Cetra).
- Paul Lindemark Jørgensen, 72, Danish Olympic sailor (1960, 1968).
- Armand Niccolai, 77, American NFL player (Pittsburgh Pirates/Steelers).
- Lloyd Rees, 93, Australian landscape painter.

=== 3 ===
- Panos Gavalas, 62, Greek singer.
- John Maher, 48, American former child alcoholic and heroin addict, founded Delancey Street Foundation, pneumonia.
- Johnny Paychek, 74, American boxer.
- Erwin Sick, 79, German inventor and entrepreneur, heart attack.
- Thawan Thamrongnawasawat, 87, Thai politician, Prime Minister of Thailand.

=== 4 ===
- Osman Achmatowicz, 89, Polish chemist.
- Gerd Arntz, 87, German artist (woodcuts).
- Rafi Muhammad Chaudhry, 85, Pakistani nuclear physicist.
- Fernand Mourlot, 93, French director of Mourlot Studios.
- Kola Onadipe, 66, Nigerian author of children's books (Sugar Girl), stroke.
- Göran von Otter, 81, Swedish diplomat.
- Jangal Santhal, 62–63, Indian political activist.
- Sir David Trench, 73, British Army officer, Governor of Hong Kong and the Solomon Islands.
- Alberto Uría, 64, Uruguayan racing driver.
- Natale Vecchi, 71, Italian Olympic wrestler (1952).

=== 5 ===
- Winfield S. Harpe, 51, American pilot, general in the U.S. Air Force, air crash.
- August Lenz, 78, German international footballer (Borussia Dortmund, Germany) and Olympian.
- Erik Lundin, 84, Swedish chess master.
- Teodor Parnicki, 79–80, Polish writer of historical novels.
- William Everett Potter, 83, American engineer and military officer, governor of the Panama Canal Zone, heart failure.
- Dave Ryan, 65, American NFL player (Detroit Lions, Boston Yanks).

=== 6 ===
- Bill Harris, 63, American guitarist, pancreatic cancer.
- Richard Lippi, 40, French Olympic rower (1968).
- Timothy Patrick Murphy, 29, American actor (Dallas), AIDS.
- Roy Orbison, 52, American singer and songwriter (Pretty Woman, Only the Lonely, Crying), heart attack.
- Charles Saxon, 68, American cartoonist (The New Yorker), heart failure.
- George Shaw, 57, American Olympic triple jumper (1952, 1956).
- Veerendra, 40, Indian film actor and director.

=== 7 ===
- Christopher Connelly, 47, American actor (Peyton Place), lung cancer.
- Jacqueline Ficini, French researcher, professor of chemistry.
- Josephine Groves Holloway, 90, American scouting leader.
- Dorothy Jordan, 82, American actress, heart failure.
- William George Juergens, 84, American district judge (United States District Court for the Eastern District of Illinois).
- Mitsu Yashima, 80, Japanese-born American artist and children's book author.

=== 8 ===
- Ivan Bonar, 64, American actor (General Hospital).
- John Joe McGirl, 67, Irish republican, Sinn Féin politician and Chief of Staff of the Irish Republican Army.
- James Hargrove Meredith, 74, American district judge (United States District Court for the Eastern District of Missouri).
- Gene Quill, 60, American jazz alto saxophonist.
- Hellmuth Reymann, 96, Nazi German army officer, defender of Berlin.
- Anne Seymour, 79, American film and television actress, heart failure.
- Ludovico Silva, 50–51, Venezuelan poet and philosopher.
- Ulanhu, 80, Chinese chairman of the Inner Mongolia Autonomous Region, vice president of People's Republic of China.

=== 9 ===
- Luke Archer, 89, American Negro Leagues baseball player.
- Wally Borrevik, 67, American basketball player.
- Rafael Luis Calvo, 76, Spanish actor (Miracle of Marcelino).
- Kainikkara Kumara Pillai, 88, Indian actor, short story writer and playwright.
- Ludmila Polesná, 54, Czech Olympic slalom canoeist (1972).

=== 10 ===
- Dennis Arundell, 90, British actor, director and composer of incidental music.
- Richard S. Castellano, 55, American actor (Lovers and Other Strangers, The Godfather), heart attack.
- Hans ten Houten, 72, Dutch Olympic rower (1936).
- Scott Johnson, 27, American student killed in Australia in a gay-hate attack. (body found on this date)
- Johnny Lawrence, 77, English cricketer (Somerset, Lincolnshire).
- Elizabeth Rawson, 54, British classical scholar (biography of Cicero).
- Dorothy de Rothschild, 93, English philanthropist and activist for Jewish affairs.
- John Baker White, 86, English politician and amateur spy, Member of Parliament.
- Lawrence Wien, 83, American lawyer and real estate investor, prostate cancer.

=== 11 ===
- Kari Kairamo, 55, Finnish chairman and CEO of Nokia, suicide.
- Wilhelm Petersén, 82, Swedish Olympic ice hockey player (1928, 1936).
- Nagendra Singh, 74, Indian lawyer, President of the International Court of Justice, heart attack.

=== 12 ===
- Bill Bertani, 69, American Olympic soccer player (1948).
- K. K. Chen, 90, Chinese-born American scientist, pharmacological researcher at Eli Lilly and Company (ephedrine).
- Dick Clair, 57, American television producer, actor and writer (It's a Living, The Facts of Life, Mama's Family), AIDS.
- Bruce Alan Davis, 40, American serial killer, suicide.
- June Tarpé Mills, 76, American comic book creator (Miss Fury).
- Henri Peyre, 87, French-born American linguist, heart failure.
- Anthony Provenzano, 71, American mobster of the Genovese crime family, heart attack.
- Joe Reichler, 73, American sports writer (Associated Press), cancer.
- Rudolf Schündler, 82, German actor and director (The Exorcist), heart attack.
- Stjepan Vrbančić, 88, Yugoslavian Olympic footballer (1924).
- Loudon Wainwright Jr., 63, American writer and columnist (The View from Here), colon cancer.

=== 13 ===
- Hans Fischer, 27, Brazilian cyclist and Olympian (1980, 1984), cardiac arrest.
- Brynmor John, 54, British politician, Shadow Secretary of State for Defence, heart attack.
- María Teresa León, 85, Spanish writer.
- Muhammad Mangundiprojo, 83, Indonesian soldier, revolutionary and civil servant.
- Bill Nichols, 70, American politician, member of U.S. House of Representatives (1973-), heart attack.
- Fyodor Reshetnikov, 82, Soviet painter.
- Brian Sinclair, 73, British veterinary surgeon and novelist, heart attack.
- Betty Snowball, 80, English women's test cricketer, international squash and lacrosse player for Scotland.
- Roy Urquhart, 87, British army general.

=== 14 ===
- Dolf Benz, 80, Dutch Olympic sprinter (1928).
- Charlie T. Black, 87, American college basketballer.
- Narciso Busquets, 58, Mexican actor of theatre, film, television and radio.
- Evald Schorm, 56, Czech film and stage director, screenwriter and actor.
- Jean Schramme, 59, Belgian planter, mercenary in Belgian Congo.
- Stuart Symington, 87, American businessman and politician, U.S. Secretary of the Air Force, heart failure.
- Win Oo, 53, Burmese actor, singer and director, colorectal cancer.

=== 15 ===
- Leonid Andrussow, 92, German chemical engineer (hydrogen cyanide).
- Andrew James Wray Geddes, 82, Indian-born British Royal Air Force officer, led planning for Operation Manna.
- Aksel Madsen, 89, Danish Olympic long-distance runner (1928).
- Muriel Martin-Harvey, 97, English stage actress.
- Ben Mayes, 43, American AFL player (Houston Oilers).

=== 16 ===
- Anna Jean Ayres, 68, American occupational therapist and educational psychologist, breast cancer.
- Frank Bonham, 74, American author of Westerns and young adult novels.
- Tom Eastick, 88, Australian Army artillery officer during World War II.
- Joe Hatten, 72, American Major League baseball player (Brooklyn Dodgers).
- Hunter "Stork" Hendry, 93, Australian test cricketer.
- Bob Kahle, 73, American MLB player (Boston Bees).
- Ryōhei Koiso, 85, Japanese artist.
- Leonard Lindsay, 79, American Negro Leagues baseball player.
- Gisella Perl, 81, Hungarian gynecologist, helped women at Auschwitz concentration camp.
- Babe Pratt, 72, Canadian NHL ice hockey player (New York Rangers, Toronto Maple Leafs), heart attack.
- Sylvester, 41, American singer-songwriter, AIDS.

=== 17 ===
- Lies Aengenendt, 81, Dutch Olympic sprinter (1928).
- Jerry Hopper, 81, American film and television director, heart disease.
- Jimmie Mattern, 83, American aviator.
- Gisella Perl, 81, Hungarian-American gynecologist, providing assistance to prisoners at Auschwitz.
- Pavel Soukeník, 26, Czech Olympic sport shooter (1988).

=== 18 ===
- R. Arumugam, 35, Malaysian international footballer (Selangor, Malaysia), car accident.
- Niyazi Berkes, 80, Turkish Cypriot sociologist.
- Ottó Boros, 59, Hungarian Olympic water polo player (1956, 1960, 1964).
- Wendell Butcher, 74, American NFL football player (Brooklyn Dodgers).
- Milt Gantenbein, 78, American NFL footballer (Green Bay Packers).
- José González, 71, Mexican Olympic equestrian (1964).
- Paul Sievert, 93, German Olympic racewalker (1932).
- Ka. Naa. Subramanyam, 76, Indian writer and literary critic.

=== 19 ===
- Robert Bernstein, 69, American comic book writer, playwright and concert impresario ("Aquaman"), heart failure.
- Graham Higham, 60, Australian Olympic boxer (1948).
- Umashankar Joshi, 77, Indian poet and writer, lung cancer.
- Fritz Schaumburg, 82, German Olympic middle-distance runner (1936).
- Ed Stofko, 68, American NFL player (Pittsburgh Steelers).
- Joseph Towles, 52, African American anthropologist and author, AIDS.

=== 20 ===
- Josef Heinen, 59, German Olympic sprinter (1952).
- B. Jayamma, 73, Indian actress and singer.
- György Marik, 64, Hungarian international footballer (Vasas, Hungary).
- Alphonse Ouimet, 80, Canadian television pioneer, president of the Canadian Broadcasting Corporation, heart failure.
- Max Robinson, 49, American broadcast journalist, co-anchor on ABC World News Tonight, AIDS.
- Elizabeth Scott, 71, American mathematician specialising in statistics.

=== 21 ===
- Eithne Dunne, 69, Irish actress.
- Willie Kamm, 88, American Major League baseball player (Chicago White Sox, Cleveland Indians), Parkinson's disease.
- Philip Magnus, 82, British biographer.
- Federico Moura, 37, Argentinian singer, songwriter and record producer, lead vocalist of Virus, AIDS.
- Aileen Palmer, 73, British-born Australian poet.
- Curt Richter, 94, American biologist and geneticist (circadian rhythm).
- Dave Ruhl, 68, Canadian professional wrestler.
- Merryle Rukeyser, 91, American financial columnist, heart failure.
- Bob Steele, 81, American actor, heart failure.
- Nikolaas Tinbergen, 81, Dutch biologist and ornithologist, Nobel laureate in Physiology or Medicine, stroke.
- Venus Xtravaganza, 23, American transgender performer, strangled.
- Notable people killed in the Lockerbie aeroplane disaster:
  - Bernt Carlsson, 60, Swedish diplomat, Under-Secretary-General of the United Nations.
  - Peter Dix, 35, Irish Olympic sailor (1976).
  - James Fuller, 50, American automobile executive (Volkswagen).
  - Matthew Gannon, 34, American CIA officer.
  - Paul Jeffreys, 36, English rock musician (Cockney Rebel).

=== 22 ===
- Marger Apsit, 79, American NFL player.
- Franziska Boas, 86, American dancer.
- Chico Mendes, 44, Brazilian trade union member and environmental activist, murdered.
- Tom William Scott, 86, American general in the U.S. Air Force.
- Tucker Smith, 52, American actor, dancer and singer (West Side Story), cancer.
- Rexhai Surroi, 59, Yugoslav Albanian journalist, diplomat and writer, ambassador to five countries, car accident.
- Wang Bingnan, 79–80, Chinese diplomat, ambassador to Poland.

=== 23 ===
- Gerhard Adler, 84, German analytical psychologist.
- Elvin C. Drake, 85, American track and field coach, heart attack.
- Alexandre Gelbert, 78, Swiss Olympic sailor (1936).
- Carlo Scorza, 91, Italian secretary of the National Fascist Party.
- Ossi Teileri, 77, Finnish Olympic middle-distance runner (1936).
- Walt Uzdavinis, 77, American NFL player (Cleveland Rams).

=== 24 ===
- Blanche Barrow, 77, American member of the Barrow Gang, lung cancer.
- Whitney Bourne, 74, American actress (Head over Heels).
- Mary Cavendish, Duchess of Devonshire, 93, Mistress of the Robes to Queen Elizabeth II.
- Joe Kresky, 82, American NFL player (Boston Braves, Philadelphia Eagles, Pittsburgh Pirates).
- Jainendra Kumar, 83, Indian writer.
- Theyre Lee-Elliott, 85, English artist.
- Evelyn Pinching, 73, British Olympic alpine skier (1936).
- Alfred M. Pride, 91, American admiral of the U.S. Navy, heart attack.
- Noel Willman, 70, Irish-born American actor and theatre director (The Man Who Knew Too Much, The Odessa File), heart attack.
- Mumon Yamada, 88, Japanese Rinzai religious leader.

=== 25 ===
- Bunny Bell, 77, English footballer (Tranmere Rovers, Everton).
- Jan Białostocki, 67, Polish art historian.
- Terence Dudley, 69, British television director and producer for the BBC (Doctor Who, All Creatures Great and Small), cancer.
- Cornelis Eecen, 90, Dutch Olympic rower (1924).
- Evgeny Golubev, 78, Soviet composer.
- W. F. Grimes, 83, Welsh archaeologist.
- Denis Matthews, 69, English pianist and musicologist, suicide.
- John Ulric Nef, 89, American economic historian, co-founder of Committee on Social Thought.
- Shōhei Ōoka, 79, Japanese novelist and translator of French literature.
- Edward Pelham-Clinton, 68, English lepidopterist and military officer, Duke of Newcastle.
- Cynthia Stone, 62, American actress.
- Napoleon Andrew Tuiteleleapaga, 84, Samoan lawyer, author and musician, heart attack.

=== 26 ===
- Herluf Bidstrup, 76, Danish cartoonist (Land og Folk).
- Anthony Gaeta, 61, American politician, Borough President of Staten Island, heart attack.
- Evie Hayes, 76, American-born Australian actor and singer (Come Up Smiling, Annie Get Your Gun), heart attack.
- Julanne Johnston, 88, American silent-screen actress (The Thief of Bagdad).
- John Loder, 90, English-American film actor.
- Glenn McCarthy, 81, American oil tycoon.
- Vangaveeti Mohana Ranga, 41, Indian politician, member of the Indian National Congress, assassinated.
- Gunnar Rosendal, 91, Swedish Lutheran priest.
- Charles Smith, 68, American actor (The Shop Around the Corner, The Major and the Minor).
- Pablo Sorozábal, 91, Spanish composer.
- Tao Zhiyue, 95–96, Chinese politician and general in the National Revolutionary Army.

=== 27 ===
- Hal Ashby, 59, American film director (Coming Home, Shampoo), pancreatic cancer.
- Joseph Beam, 33, American gay rights activist, AIDS.
- Walter Crook, 76, English international footballer and manager (Blackburn Rovers, England).
- Jack Favor, 77, American rodeo performer, acquitted after serving time for murder, cancer.
- Fox Harris, 52, American actor (Repo Man), lung cancer.
- Henry de Menten de Horne, 92, Belgian Olympic equestrian (1936).
- Freda James, 77, British tennis player and Wimbledon Doubles champion.
- Vaso Katraki, 74, Greek painter and engraver.
- Khin Kyi, 76, Burmese politician and diplomat, ambassador to India, stroke.
- Donald Laycock, 51–52, Australian linguist and anthropologist (languages of Papua New Guinea).
- C. J. McLin, 67, American politician, member of the Ohio House of Representatives.
- Jess Oppenheimer, 75, American radio and television writer and director (I Love Lucy), heart failure.
- Tecwyn Roberts, 63, Welsh-born American spaceflight engineer, helped design NASA's Mission Control Center.

=== 28 ===
- Alberto Armando, 78, Argentinian businessman and football manager (Boca Juniors).
- Karlfried Graf Dürckheim, 92, German diplomat and psychotherapist.
- Björn Kurtén, 64, Finnish vertebrate paleontologist.
- François Laverne, 81, French Olympic sailor (1948).
- Charlotte Peters, 75, American television show host.
- Wilhelm Schneider, 79, Polish Olympic pole vaulter (1936).

=== 29 ===
- Émile Aillaud, 86, French architect (La Grande Borne).
- Mike Beuttler, 48, British Formula One driver, AIDS.
- John Happenny, 87, American MLB player (Chicago White Sox).
- Carl J. Johnson, 59, American physician, whistleblower on effects of nuclear testing, complications following coronary bypass.
- Earl Mossor, 63, American MLB player (Brooklyn Dodgers).
- Rita Rait-Kovaleva, 91, Soviet literary translator and writer, translator of The Catcher in the Rye into Russian.
- Yngve Viebke, 76, Swedish Olympic equestrian (1960).

=== 30 ===
- Faber Birren, 88, American writer, consultant on colour theory, stroke.
- Jan Baalsrud, 71, Norwegian Resistance commando.
- Yuli Daniel, 63, Soviet writer and dissident (Sinyavsky–Daniel trial), stroke.
- Takeo Fujisawa, 78, Japanese businessman, co-founder of Honda Motor Co., heart attack.
- Dennis H. Klatt, 50, American researcher in speech and hearing science, cancer.
- Ernesto Lazzatti, 73, Argentinian international footballer (Boca Juniors, Argentina).
- Isamu Noguchi, 84, American artist and landscape architect, heart failure.
- Nikolai Sologubov, 64, Russian ice hockey player and Olympic gold medalist.

=== 31 ===
- Yara Amaral, 52, Brazilian actress (Mulher Objeto), heart attack from drowning.
- Christopher Andrewes, 92, British virologist who discovered the human influenza A virus.
- Ahmet Arvasi, 56, Turkish writer and philosopher.
- Oliver L. Austin, 85, American ornithologist.
- Nicolas Calas, 81, Greek-American poet and art critic, heart failure.
- Wes Flowers, 75, American MLB player (Brooklyn Dodgers).
- Loel Guinness, 82, British politician, Member of Parliament, heart disease.

=== Unknown date ===
- Charles Ganimian, 61–62, American musician and singer.
