= New Zealand at the 1936 Summer Olympics =

- IOC code: NZL
- NOC: New Zealand Olympic and British Empire Games Association
- Website: www.olympic.org.nz

in Berlin
- Competitors: 7 in 3 sports
- Flag bearer: Jack Lovelock (athlete)
- Officials: 1
- Medals Ranked 20th: Gold 1 Silver 0 Bronze 0 Total 1

Summer Olympics appearances (overview)
- 1908; 1912; 1920; 1924; 1928; 1932; 1936; 1948; 1952; 1956; 1960; 1964; 1968; 1972; 1976; 1980; 1984; 1988; 1992; 1996; 2000; 2004; 2008; 2012; 2016; 2020; 2024; 2028

Other related appearances
- Australasia (1908–1912)

New Zealand competed at the 1936 Summer Olympics in Berlin, Germany. The team of seven competitors, all men, took part in nine events in three sports at the Games. Late in the process, Arthur Porritt was appointed manager of the New Zealand team. Jack Lovelock won New Zealand's only medal of the Games by winning the 1500 metres, the country's first gold medal in athletics.

== Medallists ==
Medal	Name	Sport	Event	Date
Gold	Jack Lovelock	Athletics	Men's 1500 m	6 August

== Competitors ==
The following table lists the number of New Zealand competitors participating at the Games according to gender and sport.

Sport	Men	Women	Total
Athletics	3	0	3
Boxing	3	—N/a	3
Cycling	1	—N/a	1
Total	7	0	7

== Athletics ==
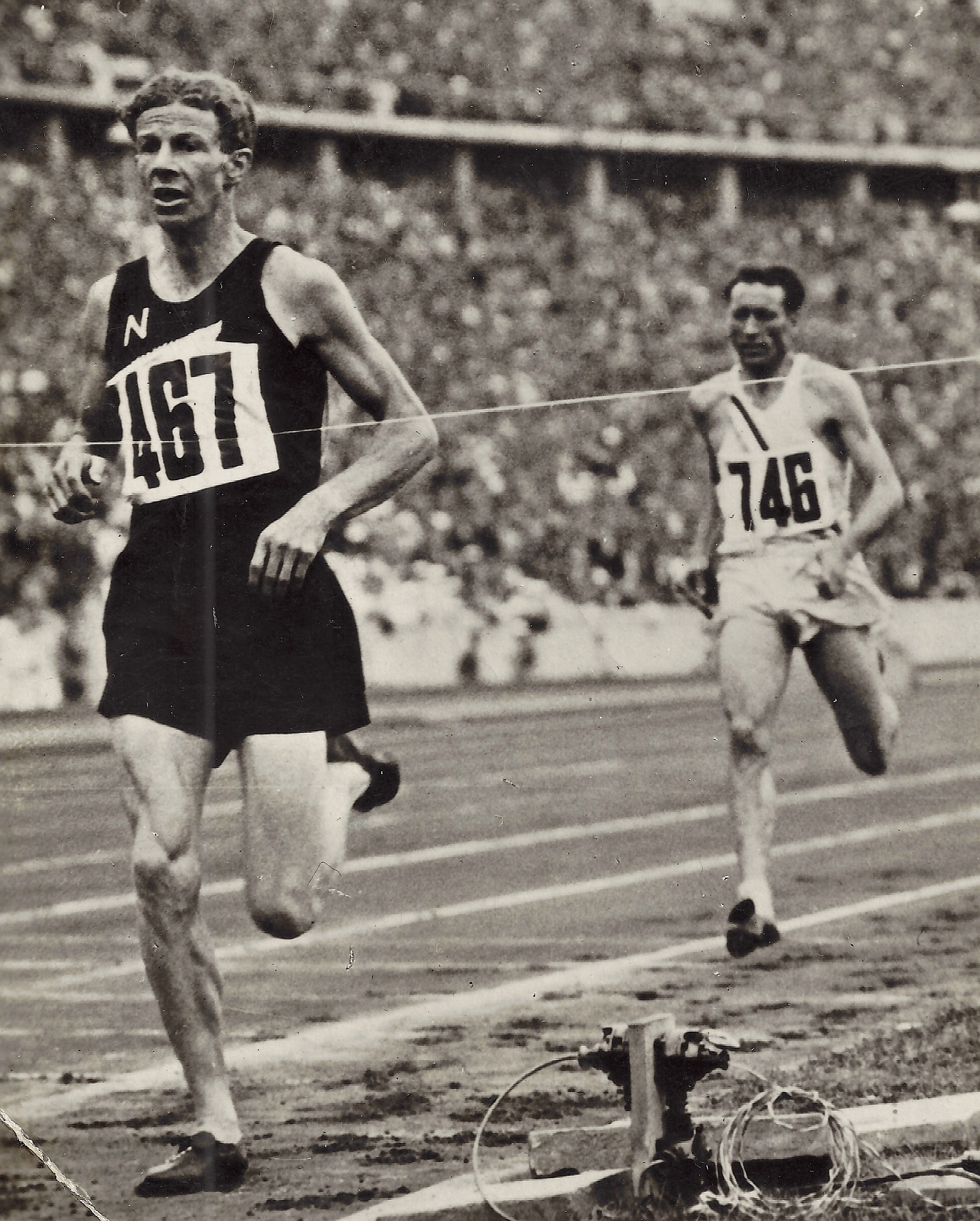
Lovelock winning the 1500 m

Lovelock considered competing in both the 1500 metres and the unfamiliar 5000 metres. He asked New Zealand team manager Arthur Porritt to decide and Porritt told him to run just the shorter distance. He then got an injection for pain in his knee.

He won his semifinal heat and made it into the 12-man final, which also included Luigi Beccali, Jerry Cornes, and Phil Edwards, the gold, silver and bronze medalists, respectively, of the 1932 Olympics, as well as Glenn Cunningham, who had placed fourth in 1932 and was the world record holder for the mile.

The final started slowly, with Cunningham leading a bunched-up field at 800 m. The Swede Eric Ny took over, but with 300 m to go, Lovelock made his move and surged past Ny into the lead, which he held to the finish line, ahead of Cunningham and defending Olympic champion Beccali. Both he and Cunningham broke the world record (3:48.8 by Bill Bonthron), Lovelock with a time of 3:47.8 and Cunningham at 3:48.4. It was New Zealand's first Olympic gold medal in athletics.

Athlete	Event	Heat		Quarterfinal		Semifinal		Final	
Athlete	Event	Result	Rank (Note: Ranks given are within the heat)	Result	Rank	Result	Rank (Note: Ranks given are within the semifinal)	Result	Rank
Pat Boot	Men's 800 m	1:56.6	3 Q	—N/a			7	did not advance	
Jack Lovelock	Men's 1500 m	4:00.6	3 Q	—N/a				3:47.8 WR	1st place, gold medalist(s)
Cecil Matthews	Men's 5000 m		8	—N/a				did not advance	

== Boxing ==
Name	Event	Round of 32	Round of 16	Quarterfinals	Semifinals	Final	Rank
Name	Event	Opposition Result	Opposition Result	Opposition Result	Opposition Result	Opposition Result	Rank
Clarrie Gordon	Men's featherweight	Karlsson (FIN); L Pts	Did not advance				=16
Norman Fisher	Men's lightweight	Bye	Oliver (ARG); L Pts	Did not advance			=9
Thomas Arbuthnott	Men's welterweight	Bye	Rodríguez (ARG); L Pts	Did not advance			=9

== Cycling ==
George Giles was the sole cyclist representing New Zealand; his best result was 8th in the 1 km time trial.

=== Road ===
Athlete	Event	Time	Rank
George Giles	Men's individual road race	untimed	AC

=== Track ===
Men's sprint

Athlete	Round 1	Repechage	Round 2	Quarterfinals	Semifinals	Final / BM	
Athlete	Opposition Time	Opposition Time	Opposition Time	Opposition Time	Opposition Time	Opposition Time	Rank
George Giles	Győrffy (HUN); W 12.6	—N/a	Pola (ITA); L	did not advance			

Men's 1 km time trial

Athlete	Time	Rank
George Giles	1:15.0	=8
