= 1934 European Athletics Championships – Men's 1500 metres =

Men's 1500 metres at the European Athletics Championships
- Venue: Stadio Benito Mussolini
- Location: Turin
- Dates: 7 September (heats & final)
- Competitors: 14 from 11 nations
- Winning time: 3:54.6

Medalists
gold medal	Luigi Beccali	Italy
silver medal	Miklós Szabó	Hungary
bronze medal	Roger Normand	France

The men's 1500 metres at the 1934 European Athletics Championships was held in Turin, Italy, at the Stadio Benito Mussolini on 7 September 1934.

== Results ==
=== Final ===
7 September

Rank	Name	Nationality	Time	Notes
1st place, gold medalist(s)	Luigi Beccali	Italy	3:54.6	CR
2nd place, silver medalist(s)	Miklós Szabó	Hungary	3:55.2	
3rd place, bronze medalist(s)	Roger Normand	France	3:57.0	
4	Friedrich Schaumburg	Germany	3:57.8	
5	Janusz Kusociński	Poland	3:59.4	
6	Martti Matilainen	Finland	3:59.6	
7	Robert Goix	France	4:04.0	
8	Ademar Jürlau	Estonia	4:05.8	
9	Paul Martin	Switzerland	4:06.6	
10	Umberto Cerati	Italy	NT	
11	Rene Geeraert	Belgium	NT	

=== Heats ===
7 September

==== Heat 1 ====
Rank	Name	Nationality	Time	Notes
1	Friedrich Schaumburg	Germany	4:02.4	Q
2	Luigi Beccali	Italy	4:03.2	Q
3	Roger Normand	France	4:03.4	Q
4	Ademar Jürlau	Estonia	4:04.2	Q
5	Georg Puchberger	Austria	4:04.9	

==== Heat 2 ====
Rank	Name	Nationality	Time	Notes
1	Rene Geeraert	Belgium	4:01.2	CR, Q
2	Paul Martin	Switzerland	4:01.8	Q
3	Janusz Kusociński	Poland	4:01.8	Q
4	Umberto Cerati	Italy	4:01.8	Q
5	Bedřich Hošek	Czechoslovakia	4:02.0	
6	Eduard Prööm	Estonia	4:04.8	

==== Heat 3 ====
Rank	Name	Nationality	Time	Notes
1	Miklós Szabó	Hungary	4:19.0	Q
2	Martti Matilainen	Finland	4:19.0	Q
3	Robert Goix	France	4:19.3	Q

== Participation ==
According to an unofficial count, 14 athletes from 11 countries participated in the event.

- Austria (1)
- Belgium (1)
- Czechoslovakia (1)
- Estonia (2)
- Finland (1)
- France (2)
- Germany (1)
- Hungary (1)
- Italy (2)
- Poland (1)
- Switzerland (1)
