= 1934 NCAA Track and Field Championships =

1934 NCAA Men's Track and Field Championships
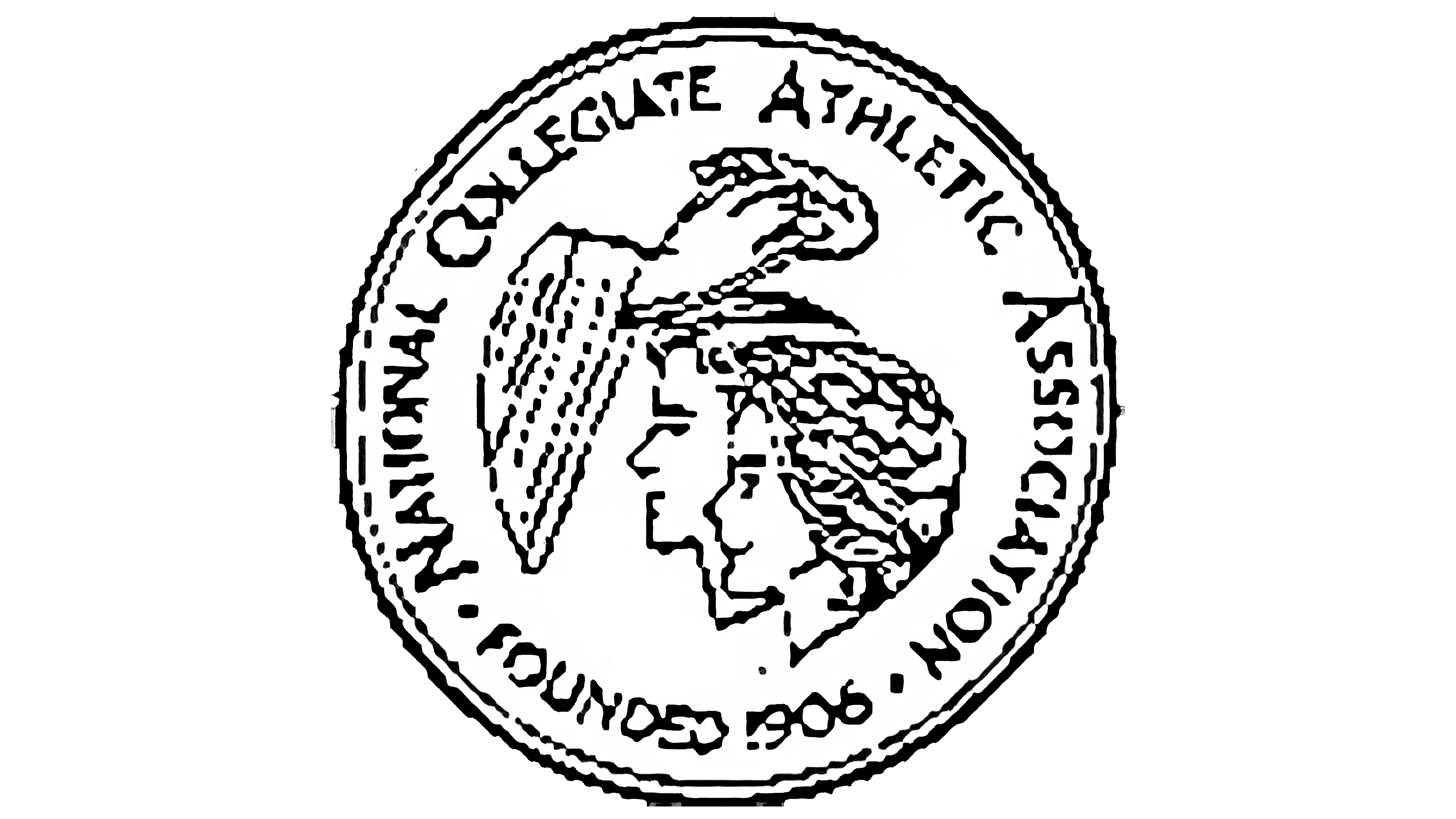
- Team Champion: Stanford (3rd title)
- Edition: 13th
- Dates: June 22-23 1934
- Host city: Los Angeles, California; University of Southern California
- Venue: Los Angeles Memorial Coliseum
- Participation: 323 athletes

The 1934 NCAA Track and Field Championships was the 13th NCAA track and field championship meeting. The event was held at the Los Angeles Memorial Coliseum in Los Angeles, California, United States in June 1934, with 323 athletes from 89 schools taking part. Stanford Indians, coached by Dink Templeton, won the team championship with 63 points. Dean Cromwell's USC Trojans, winners of the next nine team titles, took a close second, with defending champions LSU Tigers placing third.

In five events, the results as originally announced were adjusted after the meet as photo finish pictures were examined. According to the original results, Stanford's only individual champion was discus thrower Gordon "Slinger" Dunn, but hurdler Sam Klopstock was also awarded first place after the finish-line camera showed he had won by inches. Additional points finishes across the board, including a second and third place from John Lyman, propelled the Indians to victory. Glenn "Slats" Hardin of LSU and Ralph Metcalfe of Marquette were the only athletes to win two events. Bill Bonthron of Princeton, who won the 1934 James E. Sullivan Award as the top amateur sportsman in the United States, provided another of the meeting's highlights in winning the mile run ahead of world record holder Glenn Cunningham.

== Team scoring ==
1. Stanford - 63 points
2. USC - 57 7/20 points
3. LSU - 43 points
4. Indiana - 20 points
4. Marquette - 20 points
6. Fresno State - 18 points
6. Manhattan - 18 points

== Track events ==
100-yard dash
1. Ralph Metcalfe, Marquette - 9.7 seconds
2. Charlie Parsons, USC
2. Hunter Russell, Illinois
4. Foy Draper, USC
5. Jimmy Willson, Stanford
6. Sterling Dupree, Auburn

120-yard high hurdles
1. Sam Klopstock, Stanford - 14.63
2. Amsden Oliver, Miami (Ohio)
3. George Fisher, LSU
4. Sam Allen, Oklahoma Baptist
5. Ned Bacon, Denison
6. Lee Haring, Emporia State

220-yard dash
1. Ralph Metcalfe, Marquette - 20.9
2. Charlie Parsons, USC
3. Jimmy Willson, Stanford
4. Foy Draper, USC
5. Sterling Dupree, Auburn
6. Ed Hall, Kansas

220-yard low hurdles
1. Glenn Hardin, LSU - 23.16 (hand time 22.7 equal meeting record, unratified world record)
2. Amsden Oliver, Miami (Ohio)
3. Heye Lambertus, Nebraska
4. Vince Reef, Occidental
5. Wilbert Randow, Texas A&M
6. Ned Bacon, Denison

440-yard dash
1. Glenn Hardin, LSU - 47.0 (new meeting record)
2. Ivan Fuqua, Indiana
3. John McCarthy, USC
4. Louis Brothers, Rice
5. Ed Ablowich, USC
6. Al Fitch, USC

880-yard run
1. Chuck Hornbostel, Indiana - 1:51.9
2. Jimmy Miller, UCLA
3. William Ray, Manhattan
4. Elroy Robinson, Fresno State
5. Estel Johnson, USC
6. Ted O'Neal, LSU

One-mile run
1. Bill Bonthron, Princeton - 4:08.9 (new meeting record)
2. Glenn Cunningham, Kansas
3. Gene Venzke, Penn
4. Harry Williamson, North Carolina
5. Otto Pongrace, Michigan State
6. Charles Nimmo, Stanford

Two-mile run
1. Frank Crowley, Manhattan - 9:22.4
2. William Zepp, Eastern Michigan
3. Ray Sears, Butler
4. Robert Wagner, Oregon
5. John Sanders, LSU
6. Floyd Lochner, Oklahoma

== Field events ==
Broad jump
1. Al Olson, USC - 25 feet, 4 1/4 inches
2. Bob Clark, California
3. Moncure Little, William & Mary
3. Floyd Wilson, Fresno State
5. George Meagher, Notre Dame
6. Douglas Taylor, San Jose State

High jump
1. Walter Marty, Fresno State - 6 feet, 6 3/4 inches
1. George Spitz, NYU - 6 feet, 6 3/4 inches
3. Lloyd Richey, Auburn
4. Will Brannan, USC
4. Vincent Murphy, Notre Dame
4. Howard Spencer, Geneva
4. Steve Woodbury, Dartmouth

Pole vault
1. Jack Rand, San Diego State - 14 feet, 1/2 inch (new meeting record)
2. Bud Deacon, Stanford
3. James Fimple, USC
3. Ray Lowry, Eastern Michigan
3. Scott Massey, UCLA
3. Irving Seely, Illinois
3. Charles Van Tress, California

Shot put
1. Jack Torrance, LSU - 54 feet, 6 9/16 inches (new meeting record)
2. John Lyman, Stanford
3. George Theodoratus, Washington State
4. Gordon Dunn, Stanford
5. Honk Irwin, Texas A&M
6. Hueston Harper, USC

Discus throw
1. Gordon Dunn, Stanford - 162 feet, 7 inches
2. Ken Carpenter, USC
3. John Lyman, Stanford
4. Honk Irwin, Texas A&M
5. Wes Busbee, Indiana
6. Chester Cruikshank, Colorado State

Javelin throw
1. Bob Parke, Oregon - 220 feet, 11 5/8 inches (new meeting record)
2. John Mottram, Stanford
3. Ralston LeGore, North Carolina
4. Nathan Blair, LSU
5. Horace Odell, Manhattan
6. William Reitz, UCLA

Hammer throw
1. Henry Dreyer, Rhode Island - 169 feet, 8 3/8 inches
2. Pete Zaremba, NYU
3. Donald Favor, Maine
4. Chester Cruikshank, Colorado State
5. Gantt Miller, West Virginia
6. Norman Cahners, Harvard

== See also ==
- NCAA Men's Outdoor Track and Field Championship
