= 1938 European Athletics Championships – Men's 1500 metres =

Men's 1500 metres at the European Athletics Championships

The men's 1500 metres at the 1938 European Athletics Championships was held in Paris, France, at Stade Olympique de Colombes on 3 and 5 September 1938.

== Medalists ==
| Gold | Sydney Wooderson; Great Britain |
| Silver | Joseph Mostert; Belgium |
| Bronze | Luigi Beccali; Italy |

== Results ==
=== Final ===
5 September

| Rank | Name | Nationality | Time | Notes |
|---|---|---|---|---|
| 1st place, gold medalist(s) | Sydney Wooderson | Great Britain | 3:53.6 | CR |
| 2nd place, silver medalist(s) | Joseph Mostert | Belgium | 3:54.5 | |
| 3rd place, bronze medalist(s) | Luigi Beccali | Italy | 3:55.2 | |
| 4 | Niilo Hartikka | Finland | 3:56.5 | |
| 5 | Toivo Sarkama | Finland | 3:56.7 | |
| 6 | Jan Staniszewski | Poland | 3:58.4 | |
| 7 | Jim Alford | Great Britain | 4:03.0 | |
| 8 | Ingvar Haglund | Sweden | 4:08.2 | |
| 9 | Robert Goix | France | 4:10.0 | |
| | Pierre Leichtnam | France | DNF | |

=== Heats ===
3 September

==== Heat 1 ====
| Rank | Name | Nationality | Time | Notes |
|---|---|---|---|---|
| 1 | Joseph Mostert | Belgium | 3:57.7 | Q |
| 2 | Toivo Sarkama | Finland | 3:57.8 | Q |
| 3 | Sydney Wooderson | Great Britain | 3:58.1 | Q |
| 4 | Ingvar Haglund | Sweden | 3:59.5 | Q |
| 5 | Robert Goix | France | 4:09.0 | Q |
| 6 | Renzo Zipoli | Italy | 4:11.0 | |
| 7 | Frits de Ruyter | Netherlands | NT | |

==== Heat 2 ====
| Rank | Name | Nationality | Time | Notes |
|---|---|---|---|---|
| 1 | Luigi Beccali | Italy | 4:02.0 | Q |
| 2 | Niilo Hartikka | Finland | 4:02.3 | Q |
| 3 | Jim Alford | Great Britain | 4:02.5 | Q |
| 4 | Pierre Leichtnam | France | 4:03.1 | Q |
| 5 | Jan Staniszewski | Poland | 4:03.6 | Q |
| 6 | Jean Deloge | Luxembourg | 4:12.1 | |
| | Åke Jansson | Sweden | DNF | |

== Participation ==
According to an unofficial count, 14 athletes from 9 countries participated in the event.

- Belgium (1)
- Finland (2)
- France (2)
- Italy (2)
- Luxembourg (1)
- Netherlands (1)
- Poland (1)
- Sweden (2)
- Great Britain (2)
