= Athletics at the 1932 Summer Olympics – Men's 1500 metres =

Men's 1500 metres at the Games of the X Olympiad
- Olympic Athletics
- Venue: Los Angeles Memorial Coliseum
- Dates: August 3 and August 4, 1932
- Competitors: 24 from 14 nations
- Winning time: 3:51.2 OR

Medalists
1st place, gold medalist(s)		Luigi Beccali; Italy
2nd place, silver medalist(s)		Jerry Cornes; Great Britain
3rd place, bronze medalist(s)		Phil Edwards; Canada

The men's 1500 metres middle-distance event at the 1932 Summer Olympics took place on August 3 and August 4 at the Los Angeles Memorial Coliseum. Twenty-four athletes from 14 nations competed. The 1930 Olympic Congress in Berlin had reduced the limit from 4 athletes per NOC to 3 athletes. The event was won by Luigi Beccali of Italy, earning the nation's first medal in the 1500 metres. Canada also won its first 1500 metres medal, with Phil Edwards's bronze.

== Background ==
This was the ninth appearance of the event, which is one of 12 athletics events to have been held at every Summer Olympics. Despite the low attendance in 1932 generally, the 1500 metres had a strong field. Returning finalists from 1928 were Finland's medalists, gold winner Harri Larva and bronze winner Eino Purje, along with sixth-place finisher Paul Martin of Switzerland. Other top runners included Jack Lovelock of New Zealand, Luigi Beccali of Italy, Glenn Cunningham of the United States, and Phil Edwards of Canada.

Brazil and New Zealand each made their first appearance in the event. The United States made its ninth appearance, the only nation to have competed in the men's 1500 metres at each Games to that point.

== Competition format ==
The competition consisted of two rounds, the format used since 1908. With fewer runners than in previous Games, the number of semifinals was reduced to three (with between 7 and 9 runners each after withdrawals). The top four runners in each heat advanced to the final, maintaining the 12-man final race.

== Records ==
These were the standing world and Olympic records (in minutes) prior to the 1932 Summer Olympics.

World record	Jules Ladoumègue (FRA)	3:49.2	Paris, France	5 October 1930
Olympic record	Harri Larva (FIN)	3:53.2	Amsterdam, Netherlands	2 August 1928

In the final Luigi Beccali set a new Olympic record at 3:51.2.

== Schedule ==
Date	Time	Round
Wednesday, 3 August 1932	17:15	Semifinals
Thursday, 4 August 1932	15:45	Final

== Results ==
=== Semifinals ===
Three heats were held; the fastest four runners from each heat advanced to the final round.

==== Semifinal 1 ====
Rank	Athlete	Nation	Time	Notes
1	Glenn Cunningham	United States	3:55.8	Q
2	Jerry Cornes	Great Britain	4:01.0	Q
3	Martti Luomanen	Finland	4:01.5	Q
4	Phil Edwards	Canada	4:03.5	Q
5	Hermenegildo del Rosso	Argentina	4:06.0	
6	Christian Markersen	Denmark	4:06.5	
7	Amilio Rodríguez	Mexico		

==== Semifinal 2 ====
Rank	Athlete	Nation	Time	Notes
1	Jack Lovelock	New Zealand	3:58.0	Q
2	Norwood Hallowell	United States	3:58.1	Q
3	Eddie King	Canada	3:58.6	Q
4	Harri Larva	Finland	3:58.8	Q
5	Paul Martin	Switzerland	3:59.1	
6	Folke Skoog	Sweden	3:59.6	
7	Bill Barwick	Australia	4:03.5	
—	Armando Bréa	Brazil	DNF	

==== Semifinal 3 ====
Rank	Athlete	Nation	Time	Notes
1	Luigi Beccali	Italy	3:59.6	Q
2	Eino Purje	Finland	3:59.7	Q
3	Eric Ny	Sweden	3:59.9	Q
4	Frank Crowley	United States	4:00.0	Q
5	Les Wade	Canada	4:00.5	
6	Pedro Ortíz	Mexico	4:18.0	
—	Nestor Gomes	Brazil	DNF	
—	Reg Thomas	Great Britain	DNF	
—	Otto Peltzer	Germany	DNF	

=== Final ===
Rank	Athlete	Nation	Time	Notes
1st place, gold medalist(s)	Luigi Beccali	Italy	3:51.2	OR
2nd place, silver medalist(s)	Jerry Cornes	Great Britain	3:52.6	
3rd place, bronze medalist(s)	Phil Edwards	Canada	3:52.8	
4	Glenn Cunningham	United States	3:53.4	
5	Eric Ny	Sweden	3:54.6	
6	Norwood Hallowell	United States	3:55.0	
7	Jack Lovelock	New Zealand	3:57.8	
8	Frank Crowley	United States	3:58.1	
9	Martti Luomanen	Finland	3:58.4	
10	Harri Larva	Finland	3:58.4	
—	Eino Purje	Finland	DNF	
—	Eddie King	Canada	DNS	
