= Athletics at the 1936 Summer Olympics – Men's 1500 metres =

Men's 1500 metres at the Games of the XI Olympiad
- Olympic Athletics
- Venue: Olympiastadion: Berlin, Germany
- Dates: August 4, 1936 (heats); August 6, 1936 (final)
- Competitors: 43 from 27 nations
- Winning time: 3:47.8 WR

Medalists
1st place, gold medalist(s)		Jack Lovelock; New Zealand
2nd place, silver medalist(s)		Glenn Cunningham; United States
3rd place, bronze medalist(s)		Luigi Beccali; Italy

The men's 1500 metres event at the 1936 Olympic Games took place August 4 and August 6. Forty-three athletes from 27 nations competed. The maximum number of athletes per nation had been set at 3 since the 1930 Olympic Congress. The final was won by Kiwi Jack Lovelock in world record time. It was New Zealand's first medal in the 1500 metres. Glenn Cunningham's silver put the United States on the 1500 metres podium for the first time since 1920. Luigi Beccali did not successfully defend his 1932 gold, but took bronze to become the first man to win two medals in the event.

== Background ==
This was the 10th appearance of the event, which is one of 12 athletics events to have been held at every Summer Olympics. The event had an impressive field. Six of the top seven runners from the 1932 Games returned, including all three medalists: gold medalist Luigi Beccali of Italy, silver medalist Jerry Cornes of Great Britain, bronze medalist Phil Edwards of Canada, fourth-place finisher Glenn Cunningham of the United States, fifth-place finisher Eric Ny of Sweden, and seventh-place finisher Jack Lovelock of New Zealand. All six were contenders in 1936, along with Sydney Wooderson of Great Britain and Archie San Romani and Gene Venzke of the United States (world record holder Bill Bonthron could not make the team against Cunningham, Venzke, and San Romani).

Chile, the Republic of China, Colombia, Luxembourg, and Peru each made their first appearance in the event. The United States made its 10th appearance, the only nation to have competed in the men's 1500 metres at each Games to that point.

== Competition format ==
The competition consisted of two rounds, the format used since 1908. The number of semifinals was back up to four, with 10 or 11 runners in each. The top three runners in each heat advanced to the final, resulting in the typical 12-man final race.

== Records ==
These were the standing world and Olympic records prior to the 1936 Summer Olympics.

World record	Bill Bonthron (USA)	3:48.8	Milwaukee, United States	30 June 1934
Olympic record	Luigi Beccali (ITA)	3:51.2	Los Angeles, United States	4 August 1932

In the final Jack Lovelock set a new world record at 3:47.8. Lovelock and silver medalist Glenn Cunningham were both under the old world record; the top five finishers were all under the old Olympic record time.

== Schedule ==
Date	Time	Round
Wednesday, 5 August 1936	17:00	Semifinals
Thursday, 6 August 1936	16:15	Final

== Results ==
=== Semifinals ===
The fastest three runners in each of the four heats advanced to the final round.

==== Semifinal 1 ====
Rank	Athlete	Nation	Time	Notes
1	Eric Ny	Sweden	3:54.8	Q
2	Glenn Cunningham	United States	3:54.8	Q
3	Werner Böttcher	Germany	3:55.0	Q
4	Ossi Teileri	Finland	3:55.6	
5	Mihály Iglói	Hungary	3:56.0	
6	Grigorios Georgakopoulos	Greece	4:01.4	
7	René Geeraert	Belgium	Unknown	
8	Børge Larsen	Denmark	Unknown	
9	Pierre Hemmer	Luxembourg	Unknown	
10	Paul Martin	Switzerland	Unknown	
—	Kumao Aochi	Japan	DNS	

==== Semifinal 2 ====
Rank	Athlete	Nation	Time	Notes
1	Gene Venzke	United States	4:00.4	Q
2	Jerry Cornes	Great Britain	4:00.6	Q
3	Jack Lovelock	New Zealand	4:00.6	Q
4	Pierre Leichtnam	France	4:01.0	
5	Clarke Scholtz	South Africa	4:02.0	
6	Kiyoshi Nakamura	Japan	4:04.8	
7	Emil Goršek	Yugoslavia	4:13.0	
8	Emil Hübscher	Austria	Unknown	
9	Jack Liddle	Canada	Unknown	
10	Miguel Castro	Chile	Unknown	
—	Martti Matilainen	Finland	DNF	
—	Pat Boot	New Zealand	DNS	
—	Stavros Velkopoulos	Greece	DNS	

==== Semifinal 3 ====
Rank	Athlete	Nation	Time	Notes
1	Luigi Beccali	Italy	3:55.6	Q
2	Miklós Szabó	Hungary	3:55.6	Q
3	Phil Edwards	Canada	3:56.2	Q
4	Bobby Graham	Great Britain	3:56.6	
5	Bedřich Hošek	Czechoslovakia	3:59.4	
6	André Glatigny	France	3:59.6	
7	Gerald Backhouse	Australia	Unknown	
8	Harry Mehlhose	Germany	Unknown	
9	Reginald Uba	Estonia	4:26.2	
10	Jia Lianren	Republic of China	Unknown	
11	Emilio Torres	Colombia	Unknown	
—	Ivan Krevs	Yugoslavia	DNS	

==== Semifinal 4 ====
Rank	Athlete	Nation	Time	Notes
1	Robert Goix	France	3:54.0	Q
2	Archie San Romani	United States	3:55.0	Q
3	Fritz Schaumburg	Germany	3:55.2	Q
4	Joseph Mostert	Belgium	3:56.6	
5	Niilo Hartikka	Finland	3:59.0	
6	Franz Eichberger	Austria	3:59.2	
7	Ragnar Ekholdt	Norway	Unknown	
8	Sydney Wooderson	Great Britain	Unknown	
9	Hugh Thompson	Canada	Unknown	
10	Charles Stein	Luxembourg	Unknown	
11	Francisco Váldez	Peru	Unknown	
—	Toshinao Tomie	Japan	DNS	

=== Final ===
Rank	Athlete	Nation	Time	Notes
1st place, gold medalist(s)	Jack Lovelock	New Zealand	3:47.8	WR
2nd place, silver medalist(s)	Glenn Cunningham	United States	3:48.4	
3rd place, bronze medalist(s)	Luigi Beccali	Italy	3:49.2	
4	Archie San Romani	United States	3:50.0	
5	Phil Edwards	Canada	3:50.4	
6	Jerry Cornes	Great Britain	3:51.4	
7	Miklós Szabó	Hungary	3:53.0	
8	Robert Goix	France	3:53.8	
9	Gene Venzke	United States	3:55.0	
10	Fritz Schaumburg	Germany	3:56.2	
11	Eric Ny	Sweden	3:57.6	
12	Werner Böttcher	Germany	4:04.2	
