= Archie San Romani =

American middle-distance runner

Archie Joseph San Romani (17 September 1912 – 7 November 1994) was an American middle-distance runner. San Romani placed 4th in the 1500 meters at the 1936 Summer Olympics in Berlin and set a world record at 2000 meters the following year.

== Early life ==
San Romani was born in Frontenac, Kansas, on 17 September 1912. He was run over by a truck at age 8, and his right leg was mangled so badly that doctors considered amputating it; he took up running as a form of rehabilitation. His childhood paralleled that of his future friend and rival Glenn Cunningham, who was also from Kansas and also nearly had a leg amputated at age 8.

== Athletic career ==
San Romani studied at Emporia State Teachers College, getting his degree in music. It was there that he became one of the world's leading milers. He won the 1935 NCAA Championship mile by inches, edging out North Carolina's Henry Williamson in 4:19.1. He was third behind Cunningham and Gene Venzke at the national championships that year.

He repeated as NCAA champion in 1936, winning the 1500 m title in a meet record 3:53.0. At the national championships in Princeton he finished second to Cunningham but beat Venzke and world record holder Bill Bonthron for the first time. At the Olympic Trials the next week San Romani took the lead on the third lap and held it until Cunningham made his move with 300 meters to go. The two then fought a close battle with Cunningham prevailing by inches. Both were timed in 3:49.9, barely a second outside Bonthron's world record. Venzke was third, and these three were selected for the Olympics in Berlin.

At the Olympics San Romani placed second in his heat to qualify for the final. In the final he finished fourth in 3:50.0, missing out to New Zealand's Jack Lovelock (who set a new world record), Cunningham and Italy's defending champion Luigi Beccali.

A week later, he was part of a United States relay team (with Chuck Hornbostel, Venzke and Cunningham) that set a new world record of 17:17.2 in the 4 x Mile relay. Finally, in October he scored an upset victory in Princeton, defeating both Lovelock and Cunningham.

San Romani never won a national outdoor title, but he did become American indoor champion in 1937, beating an international field including Beccali and Venzke. He ran his personal mile best of 4:07.2 in winning the 1937 Princeton Invitational Mile and stayed in good shape for the rest of the year. In Stockholm on 5 August he ran the mile in 4:08.4 - less than two seconds outside Cunningham's world record - despite halting after 1500 meters under the impression that had been the end of the race. Three weeks later in Helsinki he ran 2000 meters in a world record time of 5:16.8, breaking Henry Jonsson's previous mark of 5:18.4. San Romani's world record lasted for almost five years until Sweden's Gunder Hägg ran 5:16.4 in July 1942.

In the winter of 1938 San Romani suffered from health problems and lost some conditioning. While he managed to return as a leading contender and only narrowly lost to Cunningham in the 1938 Princeton mile, he never improved his personal bests again. He placed third at the national championships that year and remained one of America's leading milers until his retirement in 1940.

== Retirement and later life ==
After retiring from Track & Field he lived in Portland, Maine for several years, working first as a musical instructor and then at the local shipyard. In 1945 he moved back to Kansas and opened a jewelry store in Wichita. He eventually moved to California to teach music again he taught at Dale Jr High School, and Sycamore Jr. High School, in Anaheim California; he died in Auberry, California on 7 November 1994. He was posthumously inducted into the Kansas Sports Hall of Fame in 2004.

== Personal life ==
San Romani married Lena Plumley in 1937. They had five children. Their only son, Archie San Romani Jr., also became a quality miler. A standout already in high school, the younger San Romani placed fifth at the NCAA championships in 1963 and second in 1964. At the 1964 Olympic Trials he finished fifth as the top three again made the Olympic team. Track & Field News ranked him #6 in the United States that year. He ran his best mile of 3:56.6 in 1964.

Records
Preceded by (Sweden) Henry Jonsson	Men's 2000 Meters World Record Holder; 26 August 1937 – 21 July 1942	Succeeded by (Sweden) Gunder Hägg
