= Jack Lovelock =

New Zealand athlete (1910–1949)

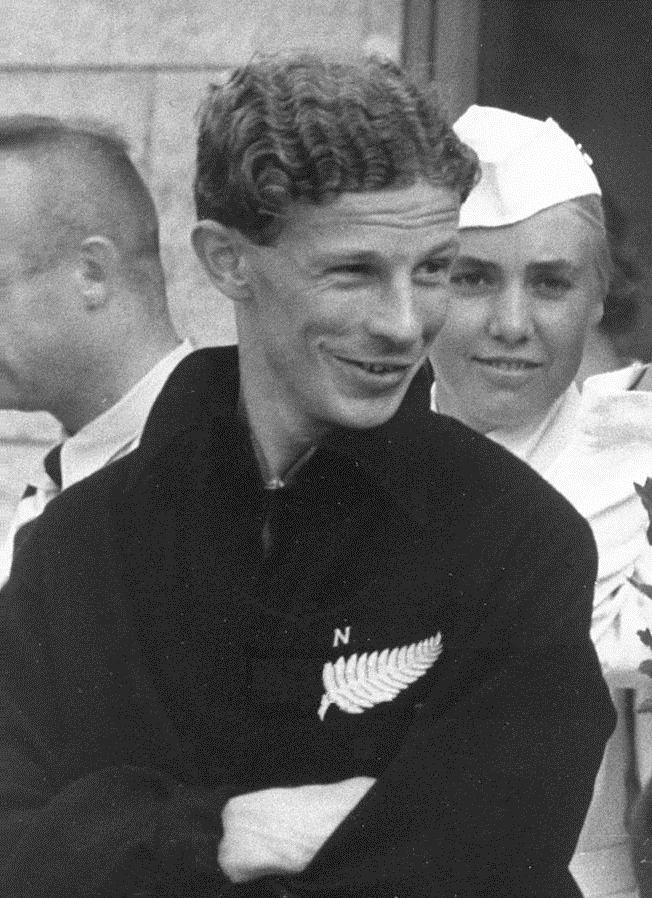
- Lovelock at the 1936 Olympics

Personal information
- Full name: John Edward Lovelock
- Nationality: New Zealand
- Born: 5 January 1910 Crushington, New Zealand
- Died: 28 December 1949 (aged 39) Brooklyn, New York, U.S.
- Height: 169 cm (5 ft 7 in)
- Weight: 61 kg (134 lb)

Sport
- Sport: Running
- Events: 1500 m, mile
- Club: University of Oxford AC; Achilles Club

Achievements and titles
- Personal bests: 1500 m – 3:47.8 (1936); Mile – 4:07.6 (1933)
Medal record
Men's athletics
Representing New Zealand
Olympic Games
Gold medal – first place	1936 Berlin	1500 metres
British Empire Games
Gold medal – first place	1934 London	1 mile

John Edward Lovelock (5 January 1910 – 28 December 1949) was a New Zealand athlete who became the world 1500m and mile record holder and 1936 Olympic champion in the 1500 metres.

== Early life ==
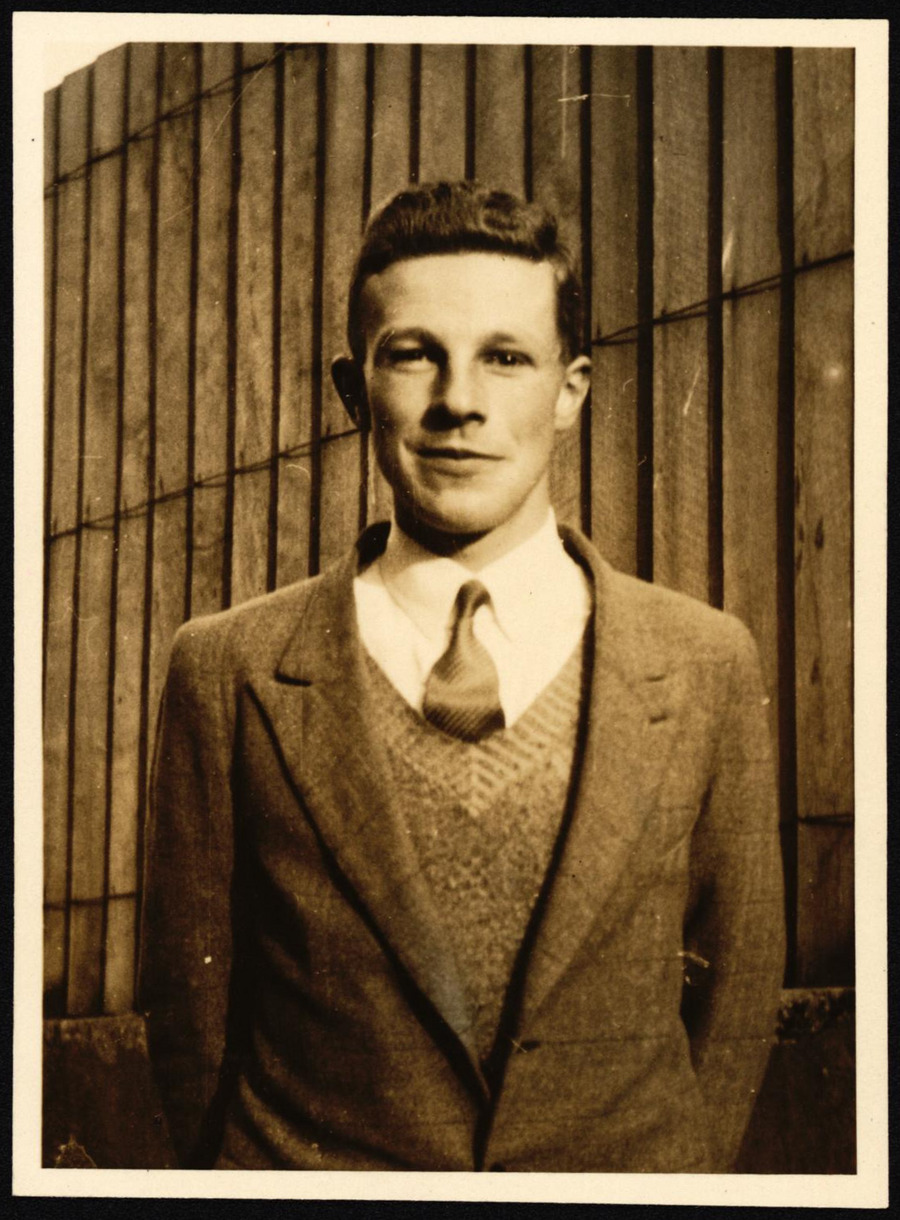
Jack Lovelock passport photo (1931)

Lovelock was born in the town of Crushington (near Reefton) as the son of English immigrants. From his early days at school he participated and excelled in fields beyond athletics. At Fairlie School (1919–23) he was dux of the primary school, represented the school in rugby, competed in swimming and athletics, and was a prefect. At Timaru Boys' High School, which he attended as a boarder from 1924, he set school athletics records but was also involved in nearly every area of school life. In 1928, his final year, Lovelock was school dux, head prefect, and won the school's boxing championship cup. The following year he went to University of Otago to study medicine. Lovelock showed a talent for sports while at the university, and competed for the university team in the New Zealand 1-mile (1.6 km) championships. In 1931 he became a Rhodes Scholar at Exeter College, Oxford from 1931 to 1934. He graduated with an MB ChB degree as a medical practitioner.

== Sports career ==
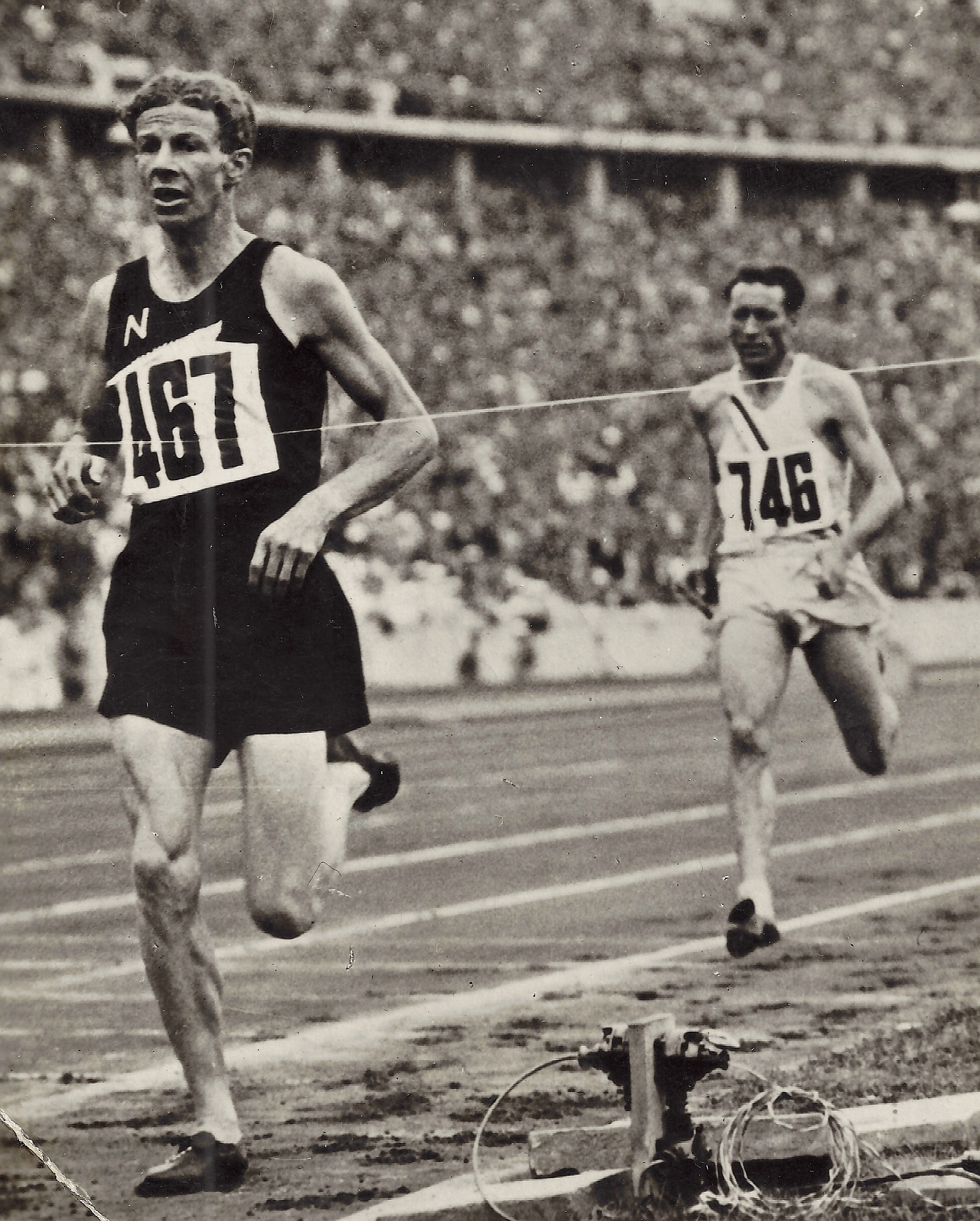
Lovelock breaking the finishing line at the 1936 Summer Olympic Games in Berlin

In 1932—by then holder of the British Empire record for the mile, at 4:12.0—Lovelock competed in the 1932 Summer Olympics in Los Angeles, and placed 7th in the final of the 1500 metres event, won by Luigi Beccali of Italy.

The following year, he set a world mile record of 4:07.6 when running at Princeton against its emerging champion Bill Bonthron. Later, in September, he represented New Zealand in the first World Student Games where he renewed his rivalry with Beccali, with Beccali winning.

Lovelock won the British AAA Championships title in the 1 mile event at the 1934 AAA Championships. Shortly afterwards, in 1934 Lovelock won the gold medal in the mile (4:13.0) at the British Empire Games. He also lost some races, and believed that he could only make one supreme effort in a season.

The highlight of Lovelock's career came in 1936, when he won the gold medal in the 1500 m at the Berlin Olympics, setting a world record in the final. Lovelock had plotted ever since his defeat at Los Angeles and developed a revolutionary tactic. The race is regarded as one of the finest 1500 m Olympic finals and included one of the finest fields assembled. Hopefuls for the final included a culmination of contenders from the first great era of mile running from 1932 to 1936 in which the world records for the 1500 m and mile had been broken several times. Lovelock's potential rivals included the American mile world record holder Glenn Cunningham who had broken Lovelock's world record in 1934, as well as Bonthron, Beccali, and the emerging English champion Sydney Wooderson, all of whom hoped to line up to race in the Berlin Games. Bonthron, who held the world 1500 m record, failed to make the US team, while Wooderson was found to have a fracture in his ankle and missed the final. The silver medalist in Los Angeles, Jerry Cornes, also raced in Berlin along with the Swedish champion Eric Ny, Canadian Phil Edwards, and American Gene Venzke, who had been regarded as the favourite for the 1932 title until injury denied him a place on the US team.

The final started slowly, with Cunningham leading a bunched-up field at 800 metres (2,600 ft). Ny then took over, but with 300 metres (980 ft) to go, Lovelock made his move and surged past Ny into the lead, which he held to the finish line, ahead of Cunningham. Both he and Cunningham broke the world record, Lovelock with a time of 3:47.8. It was New Zealand's first Olympic gold medal in athletics. Beccali was third.

Lovelock, who was the captain of the New Zealand Olympic team, raced once more for the British Commonwealth after Berlin and his last race was back at Princeton en route to a Government-sponsored trip to New Zealand where he was beaten by another of the Olympic finalists, the American Archie San Romani (fourth in Berlin), with Cunningham third, rounding out the cast of a memorable period of middle-distance running. Lovelock maintained his interest in athletics until at least the outbreak of the Second World War as a newspaper contributor.

== Later life ==
Lovelock was a major in the Royal Army Medical Corps during World War II. He married Cynthia James in 1945 and had two daughters. A year later, he began working at Manhattan Hospital in New York City. On 28 December 1949, he had telephoned his wife from work to inform her that he was coming home early because he was not feeling well. He was waiting at the Church Avenue subway station in Brooklyn, New York, when he fell onto the tracks, probably as a result of one of the dizziness attacks to which he was subject after being thrown from a horse in 1940. He was then killed by an oncoming train.

== Posthumous commemorations ==
In 1990 the New Zealand post office issued a set of stamps featuring Lovelock along with George Nēpia.

For the 1972 Munich Olympics, Lovelock's legacy stemming from the 1936 Berlin Olympics was immortalised in the naming of the Lovelockweg walkway at the Olympiapark.

The New Zealand Ministry for Culture and Heritage refers to a "Lovelock legend", and describes him as having "captured the imagination of New Zealanders and others. Streets, playing fields and sports bars have been named after him. He has inspired books, stamps, a stage play and a film. In 2002 a statue was erected at Timaru Boys High, where much of the memorabilia related to him is stored."

His Victory Oak from the 1936 Olympics was planted at Timaru Boys' High School in New Zealand, and is considered a nationally protected landmark.

The Lovelock Classic is an annual athletics meet held in Timaru, with the men's mile run as the feature event.

Lovelock Place, in the Hamilton suburb of Chartwell, is named in Lovelock's honour.

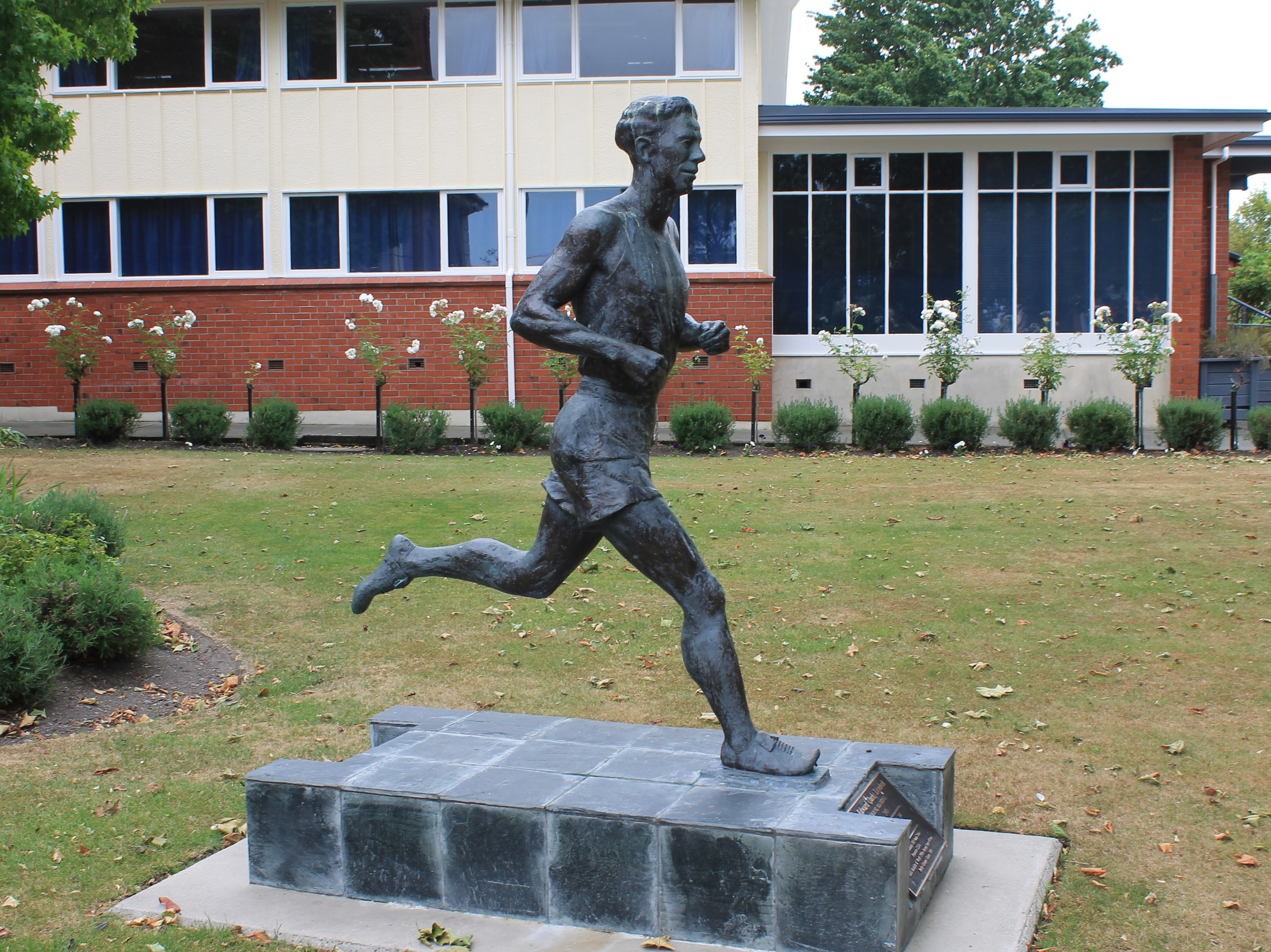
Statue at Timaru Boy's High

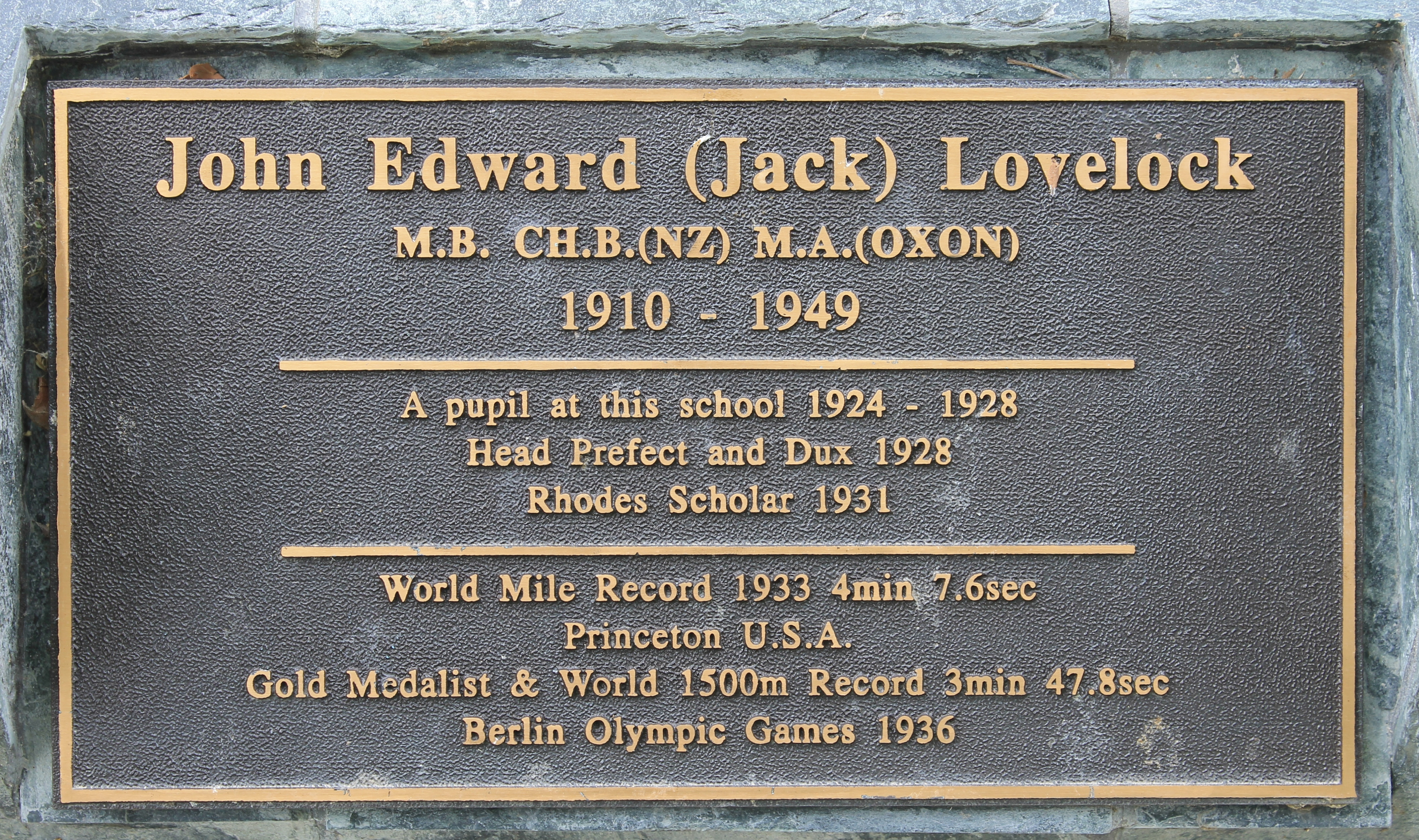
Front plate on the statue

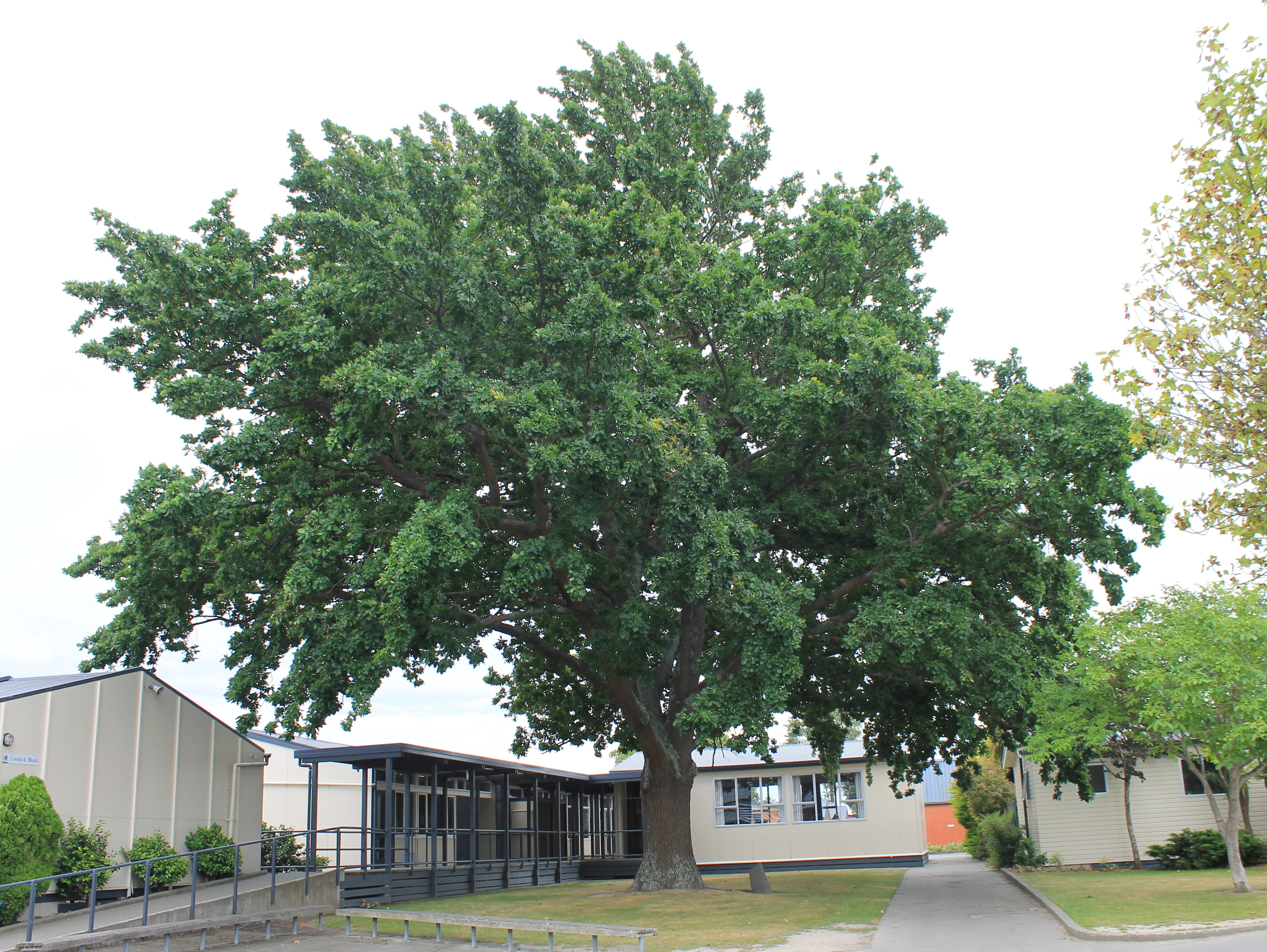
Lovelock Oak (Olympic oak tree from Berlin, 1936)

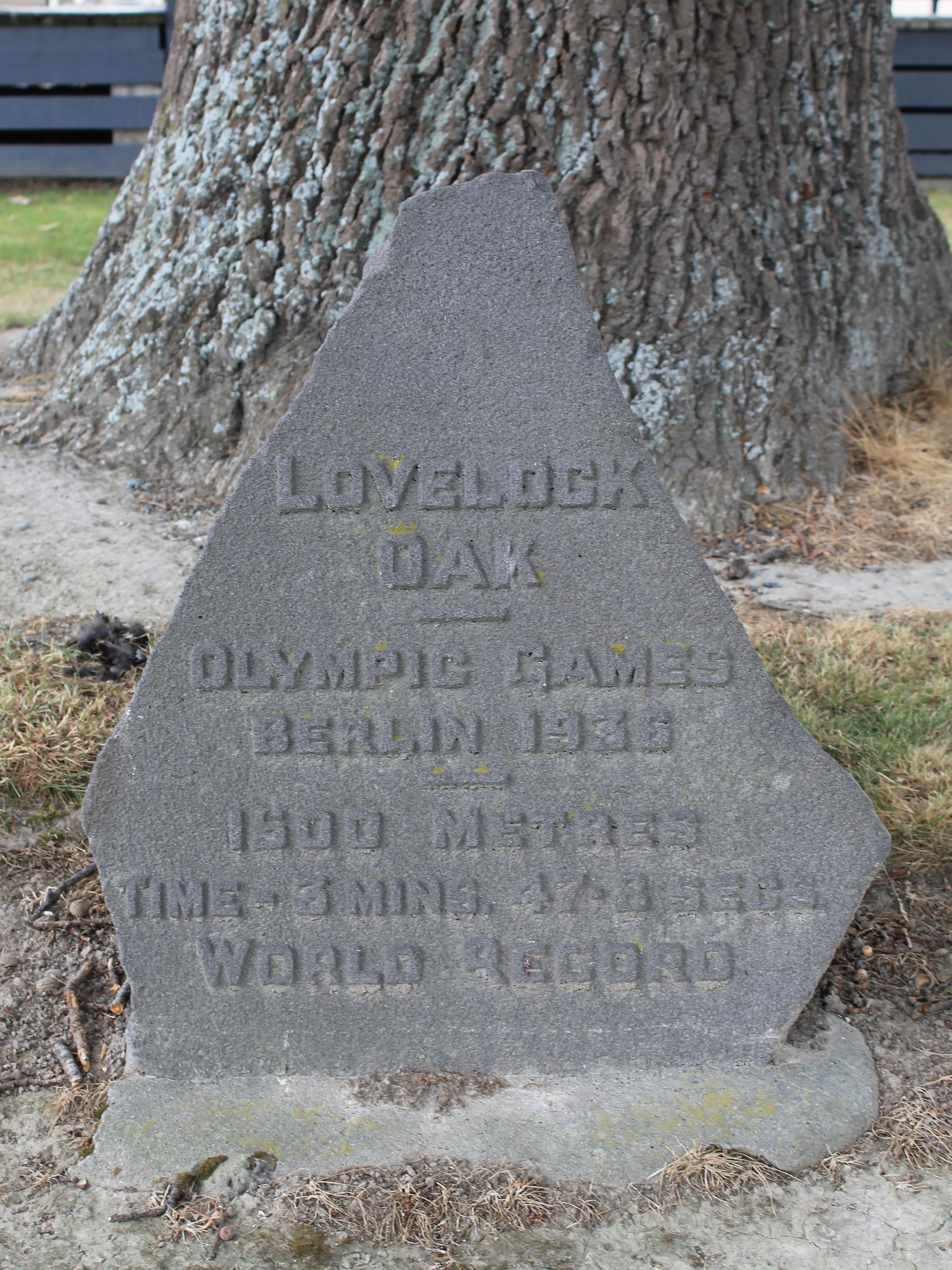
Memorial in front of Lovelock Oak

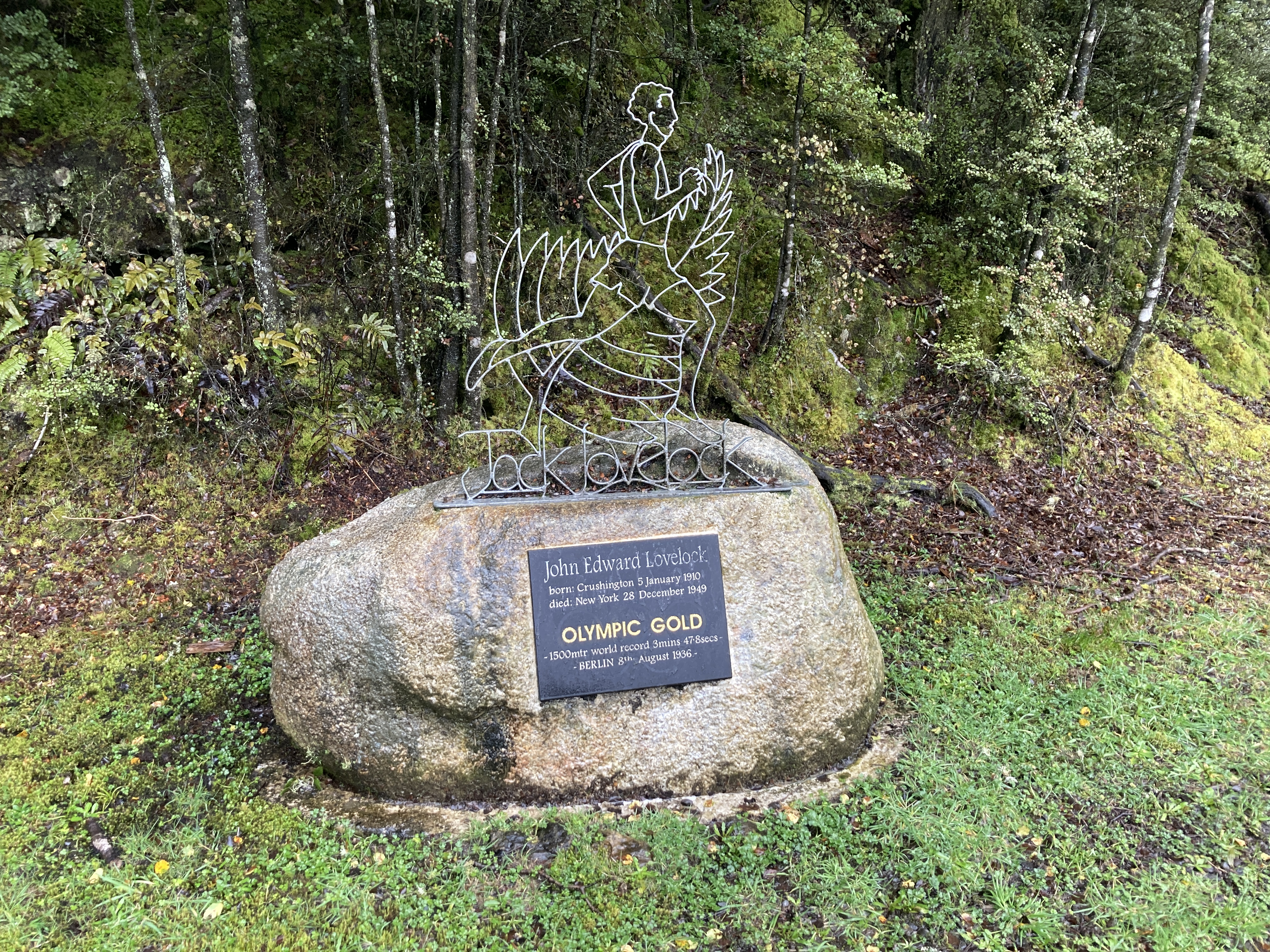
Memorial at Crushington

In Dunedin there is Lovelock Avenue and Lovelock Bush. In January 2010 the Otago Daily Times wrote:

"Jack Lovelock lived in adjacent Warden St while he studied medicine in Dunedin. Almost certainly he would have trained on both the road and the path beside the cemetery, and it was quite appropriate to rename the road and bush in his honour in 1968."

In 2018, the Lovelock archival papers, featuring material related to his life and sports science held at the Alexander Turnbull Library, were added to the Memory of the World Aotearoa New Zealand Ngā Mahara o te Ao register.

== Bibliography ==
- The Legend of Lovelock by Norman Harris, A.H. & A.W. Reed, Wellington, New Zealand, 1964
- Lovelock: New Zealand's Olympic gold miler by Christopher Tobin, Dunedin, 1984
- Jack Lovelock - Athlete & Doctor by Dr Graeme Woodfield, Wellington, 2007
- As If Running on Air: The Journals of Jack Lovelock edited by David Colquhoun, Wellington 2008
- Conquerors of Time by Lynn McConnell, London, 2009
- Lovelock by James McNeish

Records
Preceded by (United States) Bill Bonthron	Men's 1,500m World Record Holder; 6 August 1936 – 10 August 1941	Succeeded by (Sweden) Gunder Hägg
Preceded by (France) Jules Ladoumègue	Men's Mile World Record Holder; 15 July 1933 – 16 June 1934	Succeeded by (United States) Glenn Cunningham
