= Kiyoshi Nakamura =

Kiyoshi Nakamura may refer to:

- Kiyoshi Nakamura (runner) (中村 清, 1913–1985), Japanese middle-distance runner
- Kiyoshi Nakamura (footballer) (中村 聖, born 1971), Japanese footballer
