= Frank Crowley =

Frank Crowley may refer to:

- Frank Crowley (athlete) (1909–1980), American middle- and long-distance runner
- Frank Crowley (1924–2013), Australian historian
- Frank Crowley (politician) (1939–2022), Irish Fine Gael politician from Cork
