= Pedro Ortíz =

Pedro Ortíz may refer to:

- Pedro Zambrano Ortiz (born 1586), Spanish Franciscan friar
- Pedro Ortiz Dávila (1912–1986), Puerto Rican singer
- Pedro Ortíz (Mexican athlete), Mexican middle-distance runner at the 1932 Summer Olympics
- Pedro Ortiz (Colombian athlete) (born 1956), Colombian long-distance runner at the 1988 Summer Olympics
- Pedro Ortíz (footballer, born 1990), Ecuadorian football goalkeeper for Emelec
- Pedro Ortiz (footballer, born 2000), Spanish football midfielder for Sevilla Athletic
