= Chia Lien-chen =

Chinese middle-distance runner

Personal information
- Nationality: Chinese
- Born: 28 December 1912 Shanghai, Republic of China

Sport
- Sport: Middle-distance running
- Event: 1500 metres

Chia Lien-chen (Chinese: 賈連仁; pinyin: Jiǎ Liánrén, born 28 December 1912, date of death unknown) was a Chinese middle-distance runner. He competed in the men's 1500 metres at the 1936 Summer Olympics. Chia was the winner of the 800 metres and 1500 metres at the 1935 Chinese National Games.

He went to Taiwan during the Chinese Civil War and headed Kaohsiung's Sports Development Bureau from 1953 to 1957.
