= Werner Böttcher =

German middle-distance runner

Personal information
- Nationality: German
- Born: 4 September 1909
- Died: 10 November 1944 (aged 35)

Sport
- Sport: Middle-distance running
- Event: 1500 metres

Werner Böttcher (4 September 1909 – 10 November 1944) was a German middle-distance runner. He competed in the men's 1500 metres at the 1936 Summer Olympics. He was killed in action during World War II.
