= Bill Barwick (athlete) =

Australian middle-distance runner

Personal information
- Nationality: Australian
- Born: 26 May 1905
- Died: 16 June 1997 (aged 92)

Sport
- Sport: Middle-distance running
- Event: 1500 metres

Bill Barwick (26 May 1905 – 16 June 1997) was an Australian middle-distance runner. He competed in the men's 1500 metres at the 1932 Summer Olympics.
