= Joseph Mostert =

Belgian middle-distance runner (1912–1967)

Personal information
- Nationality: Belgian
- Born: 26 July 1912
- Died: 28 April 1967 (aged 54)

Sport
- Sport: Middle-distance running
- Event: 1500 metres
Medal record
Men's athletics
Representing Belgium
European Championships
Silver medal – second place	1938 Paris	1500 m

Joseph Mostert (26 July 1912 – 28 April 1967) was a Belgian middle-distance runner. He competed in the men's 1500 metres at the 1936 Summer Olympics.
