= Børge Larsen =

Danish middle-distance runner

Personal information
- Nationality: Danish
- Born: 15 February 1911
- Died: 7 July 1979 (aged 68)

Sport
- Sport: Middle-distance running
- Event: 1500 metres

Børge Larsen (15 February 1911 – 7 July 1979) was a Danish middle-distance runner. He competed in the men's 1500 metres at the 1936 Summer Olympics.
