= Harry Mehlhose =

German middle-distance runner

Personal information
- Nationality: German
- Born: 15 January 1914 Berlin, Germany
- Died: 29 June 1976 (aged 62)

Sport
- Sport: Middle-distance running
- Event: 1500 metres

Harry Mehlhose (15 January 1914 – 29 June 1976) was a German middle-distance runner. He competed in the men's 1500 metres at the 1936 Summer Olympics.
