= Ragnar Ekholdt =

Norwegian middle-distance runner

Personal information
- Nationality: Norwegian
- Born: 24 January 1914
- Died: 3 September 1998 (aged 84)

Sport
- Sport: Middle-distance running
- Event: 1500 metres

Ragnar Ekholdt (24 January 1914 – 3 September 1998) was a Norwegian middle-distance runner. He competed in the men's 1500 metres at the 1936 Summer Olympics.
