= André Glatigny =

French middle-distance runner

Personal information
- Nationality: French
- Born: 28 May 1914 Reims, France
- Died: 24 August 2003 (aged 89) Beaulieu-sur-Dordogne, France

Sport
- Sport: Middle-distance running
- Event: 1500 metres

André Glatigny (28 May 1914 – 24 August 2003) was a French middle-distance runner. He competed in the men's 1500 metres at the 1936 Summer Olympics.
