= Miklós Szabó (middle-distance runner) =

Hungarian middle-distance runner

Medal record

Men's athletics

Representing Hungary

European Championships
Gold medal – first place	1934 Turin	800 m
Silver medal – second place	1934 Turin	1500 m

Miklós Szabó (6 December 1908 – 3 December 2000) was a Hungarian middle distance runner who held world records over two distances.

Szabó won a silver medal in the first ever European Championship final, finishing second to Luigi Beccali over 1500 metres on the first day of the 1934 European Athletics Championships in Turin. Later in the same championships, Szabó defeated the home favourite, Mario Lanzi, in the final of the 800 metres—the judges awarded him the gold after both men crossed the line in a time of 1:52.0. Szabó was unable to repeat his success at the 1936 Olympics; he was eliminated after finishing fourth in his semi-final over 800 metres and finished seventh in the final of the 1500 metres. Two months after the Olympics, on 4 October 1936, Szabó broke Jules Ladoumègue's world record over 2000 metres with a time of 5:20.4. The following year, on 30 September 1937, he ran 8:56.0 to break Gunnar Höckert's world record over two miles.

Records
Preceded by (France) Jules Ladoumègue	Men's 2000 m World Record Holder; 4 October 1936 – 2 July 1937	Succeeded by (Sweden) Henry Jonsson
Preceded by (Finland) Gunnar Höckert	Men's Two Miles World Record Holder; 30 September 1937 – 7 June 1939	Succeeded by (Finland) Taisto Mäki
