= Hugh Thompson (athlete) =

Canadian middle-distance runner

Personal information
- Nationality: Canadian
- Born: 29 April 1914
- Died: 23 February 1943 (aged 28)

Sport
- Sport: Middle-distance running
- Event: 1500 metres

Hubert "Hugh" Thompson (29 April 1914 – 23 February 1943) was a Canadian middle-distance runner. He competed in the men's 1500 metres at the 1936 Summer Olympics. He was killed in action during World War II.
