= Martti Luomanen =

Finnish middle-distance runner

Personal information
- Nationality: Finnish
- Born: 5 March 1907
- Died: 4 April 1989 (aged 82)

Sport
- Sport: Middle-distance running
- Event: 1500 metres

Martti Luomanen (5 March 1907 – 4 April 1989) was a Finnish middle-distance runner. He competed in the men's 1500 metres at the 1932 Summer Olympics.
