= Christian Markersen =

Danish middle-distance runner

Personal information
- Nationality: Danish
- Born: 17 September 1908
- Died: 28 May 1982 (aged 73)

Sport
- Sport: Middle-distance running
- Event: 1500 metres

Christian Markersen (17 September 1908 – 28 May 1982) was a Danish middle-distance runner. He competed in the men's 1500 metres at the 1932 Summer Olympics.
