= Armando Bréa =

Brazilian middle-distance runner

Personal information
- Nationality: Brazilian
- Born: 31 December 1898
- Died: 21 August 1986 (aged 87)

Sport
- Sport: Middle-distance running
- Event: 1500 metres

Armando Bréa (31 December 1898 – 21 August 1986) was a Brazilian middle-distance runner. He competed in the men's 1500 metres at the 1932 Summer Olympics.
