= Niilo Hartikka =

Finnish middle-distance runner

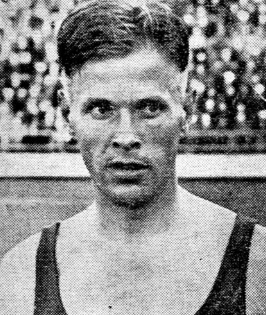
- Hartikka in 1938

Personal information
- Nationality: Finnish
- Born: 23 April 1909
- Died: 7 October 1998 (aged 89)

Sport
- Sport: Middle-distance running
- Event: 1500 metres

Niilo Hartikka (23 April 1909 – 7 October 1998) was a Finnish middle-distance runner. He competed in the men's 1500 metres at the 1936 Summer Olympics.
