= Frank Crowley (athlete) =

American runner (1909–1980)

Arthur Francis Crowley (May 21, 1909 – April 13, 1980) was an American middle-distance and long-distance runner. He finished 8th in the 1500 meters at the 1932 Summer Olympics.

== Career ==
Crowley was Manhattan College's first Olympian and NCAA champion graduating in 1934. Won NCAA two-mile championship in 1934. And, selected for the Manhattan College Athletic Hall of Fame in 1980.

Crowley placed third in the 1500 meters at the 1931 national championships. The following year the national championships doubled as the Olympic Trials and this time Crowley was second, behind Norwood Hallowell but ahead of NCAA champion Glenn Cunningham and American record holder Gene Venzke. He thus qualified for the Olympics in Los Angeles, where he placed 8th.

Crowley continued his career after the Olympics and became US champion at 5000 meters in 1934, winning in the meeting record time of 15:18.6.

There is an annual Crowley Brothers 10k Road Race (names for the three brothers) in Rutland VT exists to promote cardiovascular fitness.
