= Yngve Viebke =

Swedish equestrian (1912–1988)

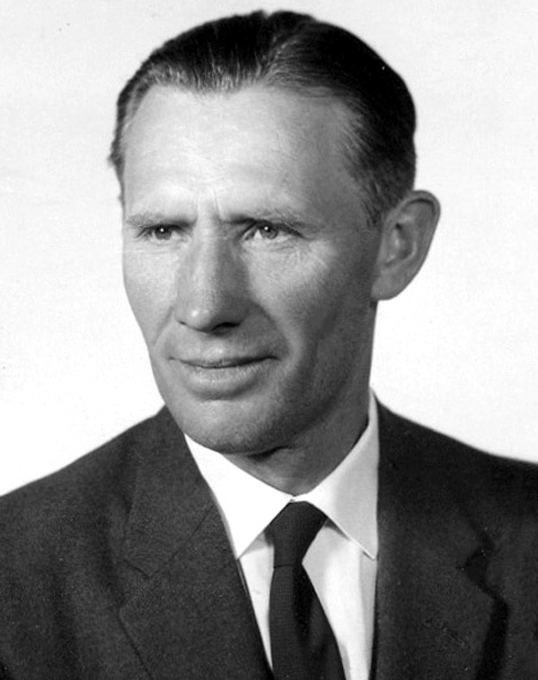

Personal information
- Born: 13 January 1912 Barkåkra, Ängelholm, Sweden
- Died: 29 December 1988 (aged 76) Kristianstad, Sweden
- Height: 182 cm (6 ft 0 in)
- Weight: 76 kg (168 lb)

Sport
- Sport: Horse riding
- Club: Kristianstads FRK

Åke Yngve Valdemar Viebke (13 January 1912 – 29 December 1988) was a Swedish horse rider. He competed in the individual mixed dressage at the 1960 Summer Olympics and placed ninth.
