= Gene Venzke =

American middle-distance runner

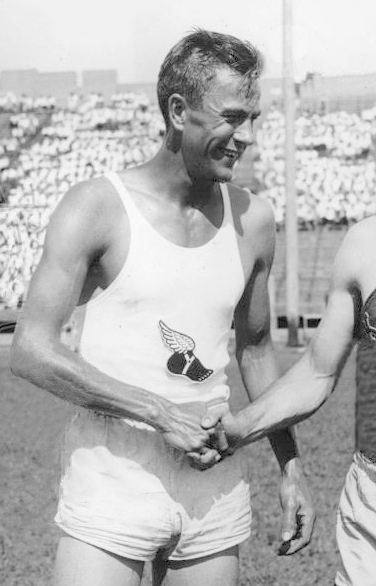
- Venzke in 1934

Personal information
- Born: June 27, 1908 Leaf Valley Township, Minnesota, U.S.
- Died: February 14, 1992 (aged 83) Exeter Township, Pennsylvania, U.S.
- Height: 188 cm (6 ft 2 in)
- Weight: 70 kg (154 lb)

Sport
- Sport: Athletics
- Event: 800 m – mile
- Club: New York Athletic Club

Achievements and titles
- Personal bests: 800 m – 1:52.5 (1935); 1500 m – 3:49.7 (1940); Mile – 4:10.0 (1932)

Eugene George Venzke (June 27, 1908 – February 14, 1992) was an American middle-distance runner. Venzke qualified for the Olympic final at 1500 meters in 1936 and set indoor world records at both 1500 meters and the mile.

== Career ==
Gene Venzke had a long career, placing in the top five at the national outdoor championships ten times between 1930 and 1940. His greatest successes, however, came indoors, as he was national champion in 1932, 1933 and 1936 and also set a number of world records.

Venzke was in excellent shape during the 1932 indoor season. On February 6 he broke the indoor mile world record of Paavo Nurmi and Joie Ray with a clocking of 4:11.2 at the Millrose Games in New York. He improved to 4:10.0 eleven days later at the Baxter Mile, also in New York. On February 27 he broke the 1500 m world record with a time of 3:53.4. Despite his age he was still in high school at the time, having dropped out for several years.

On June 18 Venzke broke the American outdoor record at Cambridge, running 3:52.6. He was considered extremely likely to make the Olympic team. However, he had already lost his best shape, having pulled a muscle in training, and at the Olympic Trials he only placed 4th, missing out by one place; he was still among the leaders with a hundred yards to go, but was passed in the final straight by Norwood Hallowell, Frank Crowley and finally Glenn Cunningham.

At the 1933 indoor championships Venzke beat the Olympic fourth placer, Cunningham, in 3:55.4. But again he failed to maintain his best shape into the summer; at the outdoor championships he was only third and Cunningham broke his American record.

Venzke's main rivals in 1934 and 1935 were Cunningham and Princeton University's Bill Bonthron. At the 1934 NCAA championships Venzke, now a sophomore at the University of Pennsylvania, placed third behind these two. At the national championships Venzke ran 1500 meters in 3:50.5; however, this was only good enough for third place as Bonthron broke the world record. At the 1935 championships he took second behind Cunningham.

Venzke regained his national indoor title in 1936, scoring a close win over Cunningham in a world record time of 3:49.9. At the outdoor championships he was again beaten to third behind Cunningham and Emporia State's Archie San Romani; however, he defeated Bonthron, who was fourth. At the Olympic Trials the following week (Note: In 1936, the national championships and the Olympic Trials were held separately for the first time since 1924. In 1992 they were merged into a single meet again.) the same men took the four top spots in the same order, with Venzke in third making the Olympic team ahead of Bonthron. At the Olympics Venzke won his heat and placed 9th in the final.

After the Olympics, he was part of a United States relay team (with Chuck Hornbostel, San Romani and Cunningham) that set a new world record of 17:17.2 in the 4 x Mile relay. He stayed in good shape for many more years, running his personal mile best of 4:08.2 in 1940. Originally from a poor family, Venzke made money as an investor and opened a golf range in Reiffton, Pennsylvania after finally retiring from running.
