= René Geeraert =

Belgian middle-distance runner

Personal information
- Nationality: Belgian
- Born: 13 October 1908
- Died: 22 September 1999 (aged 90)

Sport
- Sport: Middle-distance running
- Event: 1500 metres

René Geeraert (13 October 1908 – 22 September 1999) was a Belgian middle-distance runner. He competed in the men's 1500 metres at the 1936 Summer Olympics.
