= Ossi Teileri =

Finnish middle-distance runner

Personal information
- Nationality: Finnish
- Born: 26 November 1911 Kalvola, Finland
- Died: 23 December 1988 (aged 77) Hämeenlinna, Finland

Sport
- Sport: Middle-distance running
- Event: 1500 metres

Ossi Teileri (26 November 1911 – 23 December 1988) was a Finnish middle-distance runner. He competed in the men's 1500 metres at the 1936 Summer Olympics.
