= Eddie King (Canadian runner) =

Canadian middle-distance runner

Personal information
- Born: 18 September 1911 Hardisty, Alberta, Canada
- Died: 8 June 1994 (aged 82)

Sport
- Sport: Middle-distance running
- Event: 800 metres

Eddie King (18 September 1911 – 8 June 1994) was a Canadian middle-distance runner. He competed in the men's 800 metres at the 1932 Summer Olympics.
