= Bill Bonthron =

American middle-distance runner

William Robert Bonthron (November 1, 1912 – January 17, 1983) was an American middle-distance runner who held the world record at 1500 meters for two years.

== Career ==
Bonthron studied at Princeton University. In 1933, his junior year, Bonthron was IC4A champion at both 800 meters and 1500 meters and then set an American record in a Princeton mile race against New Zealand's Jack Lovelock. Bonthron led most of the way and attempted to pull away in the final backstretch, only to be overhauled by Lovelock, who ran the last lap in 58.9 seconds to set a new world record of 4:07.6. Bonthron finished seven yards back in 4:08.7, also under Jules Ladoumègue's old world mark.

In February 1934 Bonthron defeated 1932 and 1933 NCAA champion Glenn Cunningham in an indoor meet in New York by several inches. On June 16 Bonthron was again on the losing end of a mile world record, as Cunningham beat him in the Princeton Invitational Mile in 4:06.7. However, Bonthron came back to beat Cunningham at the NCAA championships on June 23 in a meet record time of 4:08.9. A week later at the national championships in Milwaukee, Bonthron defeated Cunningham again. The race was over 1500 meters; Cunningham went out hard and was still well ahead a hundred yards from the tape, but Bonthron came through with a blistering sprint to win by two feet in a new world record time of 3:48.8. Cunningham's time was 3:48.9, also inside Luigi Beccali's previous record of 3:49.0. Bonthron won the 1934 Sullivan Award as the top amateur athlete in the United States.

Although Bonthron originally intended to retire from running after graduating, he ended up not doing so; he, Cunningham and Gene Venzke remained America's leading milers in 1935. However, Bonthron was not in his best shape in 1936 and only placed fourth at the Olympic Trials (behind Cunningham, Archie San Romani and Venzke), failing to make the Olympic team and subsequently retiring.

In April, 1936, Bonthron, along with many other sports champions and stand outs, was honored at a banquet in Detroit, MI. This Banquet was the first celebration of Champions Day.

Records
| Preceded by (Italy) Luigi Beccali | Men's 1500 meters World Record Holder; 30 June 1934 – 6 August 1936 | Succeeded by (New Zealand) Jack Lovelock |
