= Ademar Jürlau =

Estonian middle-distance runner

Ademar Jürlau (28 March 1907 – 20 June 1995) was an Estonian middle-distance runner.

He was born in Tartu.

He competed at 1934 European Athletics Championships in the 1500 m (placed 8th) and 800 m (did not advance to the quarterfinals). He was a multiple Estonian champion in different running disciplines. He represented the Estonian national athletics team 13 times.

During World War II, he was mobilized into Red Army.
