= Pedro Ortíz (Mexican athlete) =

Mexican middle-distance runner

Personal information
- Nationality: Mexican

Sport
- Sport: Middle-distance running
- Event: 1500 metres

Pedro Ortíz was a Mexican middle-distance runner. He competed in the men's 1500 metres at the 1932 Summer Olympics.
