= Sugar Girl =

1964 children's novel by Kola Onadipe

- Author: Kola Onadipe
- Illustrator: Bruce Onobrakpeya
- Language: English
- Publisher: African Universities press
- Publication date: 1964
- Publication place: Nigeria
- OCLC: 731260

Sugar Girl is a 1964 children's novel written by Nigerian author Kola Onadipe.

== Plot ==
The story follows Ralia, a girl whose mother is blind, and whose father's back is broken. She goes missing in the forest while arranging firewood and is taken in by an old witch who offers her accommodation in return for her singing voice.

Fews days later, Ralia runs away from the witch's house and is taken in by a hunter and his family. The hunter had previously mistaken her for an animal. Ralia befriends the hunter's daughter. One day while playing together, she is knocked down by a prince who takes her home to nurse her.

After recovering, Ralia is taken back home to her village where she reunites with her parents.

== Reception ==
The book was well received and is used in Nigerian primary schools.
