= Kola Onadipe =

Nigerian writer

- Born: Nathaniel Kolawole Onadipe; 14 July 1922; Ijebu-Ode, Ogun state, Nigeria
- Died: 4 December 1988 (aged 66); Sagamu, Ogun State
- Occupations: Lawyer, Educator Author
- Writing career
- Pen name: Nita Kolon
- Genre: Children's literature
- Notable works: Sugar Girl, The Boy Slave, Magic Land of The Shadows, Koku Baboni

Nathaniel Kolawole Onadipe (14 July 1922 – 4 December 1988), most commonly known as Kola Onadipe, was a Nigerian author best known for writing children's books.

== Biography ==
Kola Onadipe was born in Ijebu-Ode, Ogun state, Nigeria. He was born into a polygamous family and was the second son of his mother. Onadipe studied Law at the University of London in 1949 and later opened a law firm with his close friend Abraham Adesanya. He had fifteen children, seven boys and eight girls, to whom he dedicated his life and ensured they excelled in achieving acceptable academic status. He died at the age of sixty-six after he suffered a stroke on 4 December 1988. He was buried at his residential home in Ogbogbo, Ijebu-Ode, Nigeria.

He was the Principal of Olu-Iwa College (one of the four major high schools in Ijebu-Ode in the late 1940s, the 1950s and early 1960s). He was a staunch disciplinarian and kept the school in top level academic and moral flavour. His popular expression was "You go" which meant that if he caught you being a truant, you will be expelled, regardless of who your parents might be. He was well respected by the proprietor of the school, Chief Timothy Adeola Odutola.

He supported his local community through philanthropic contributions as well as supporting local students’ academic goals.

== Publications ==
He dedicated most of his lifetime to education and writing books for children. He wrote a number of children's books which include:

- The Adventures of Souza. Ibadan: African Universities Press, 1963. ISBN 0-410-80038-4
- The Boy Slave. Lagos: African Universities Press, 1966. OCLC number 623440282
- Koku Baboni. Ibadan: African Universities Press, 1965. OCLC number 26910639
- Sugar girl. Nairobi: East African Pub, 1964. OCLC number 731260
- The Magic land of the Shadows. Lagos: African University Press, 1970. OCLC number 32497510
- The Forest is our Playground. Lagos, Nigeria: Africa Universities Press, 1972. OCLC number 1736920
- The Return of Shettima. Lagos: University Press, 1972. OCLC number 1747640
- Builders of Africa. Ijebu-Ode, Nigeria: Natona Press, 1980. ISBN 978-178-004-5
- Footprints on the Niger. Ijebu-Ode, Nigeria: Natona Press, 1980. ISBN 978-178-006-1
- Sunny Boy. Ijebu-Ode: Natona Press, 1980. OCLC number 9633828
- Sweet Mother. Ijebu-Ode [Nigeria]: Natona Press, 1980. ISBN 978-178-001-0
- Around Nigeria in Thirty days. Nigeria:Natona, 1981. ISBN 978-178-027-4
- Call Me Michael. Ijebu-Ode, Nigeria: Natona Press, 1981. ISBN 978-178-017-7
- Halima Must Not Die : and other plays for schools. Ijebu-Ode: Natona Press, 1981. ISBN 978-178-026-6
- Happy Birthday : Gueen for a day. Ijebu-Ode, Nigeria: Natona Press, 1982. ISBN 978-178-005-3
- Mothers-In-Law. 1982
- The Other Woman. 1982
- A Pot of Gold. Ijebu-Ode, Nigeria: Natona Press Publishers, 1984. ISBN 978-178-008-8
- Beloved Daughters. Ijebu-Ode, Nigeria: Natona Press, 1985. ISBN 978-178-022-3
- The King is Naked : and other stories. Ijebu-Ode, Nigeria: Natona Press, 1985. ISBN 978-178-025-8
- The Mysterious Twins. Ijebu-Ode: Natona, 1986. OCLC number 633642923
- Binta : The Beautiful Bride. Ijebu-Ode, Nigeria: Natona Press, 1988. ISBN 978-978-178-041-7
