= Pierre Leichtnam =

French middle-distance runner

Personal information
- Nationality: French
- Born: 9 September 1910
- Died: 25 June 1994 (aged 83)

Sport
- Sport: Middle-distance running
- Event: 1500 metres

Pierre Leichtnam (9 September 1910 – 25 June 1994) was a French middle-distance runner. He competed in the men's 1500 metres at the 1936 Summer Olympics.
