= Kiyoshi Nakamura (runner) =

Japanese middle-distance runner

Personal information
- Nationality: Japanese
- Born: 1 June 1913 Keijō, Keiki-dō, Korea, Empire of Japan
- Died: 25 May 1985 (aged 71)

Sport
- Sport: Middle-distance running
- Event: 1500 metres

Kiyoshi Nakamura (中村 清, Nakamura Kiyoshi; 1 June 1913 – 25 May 1985) was a Japanese middle-distance runner. He competed in the men's 1500 metres at the 1936 Summer Olympics.
