= Fritz Schaumburg =

German middle-distance runner

Personal information
- Nationality: German
- Born: 30 December 1905
- Died: 18 December 1988 (aged 82)

Sport
- Sport: Middle-distance running
- Event: 1500 metres

Fritz Schaumburg (30 December 1905 – 18 December 1988) was a German middle-distance runner. He competed in the men's 1500 metres at the 1936 Summer Olympics.
