= Sydney Wooderson =

British middle-distance runner

Sydney Wooderson MBE
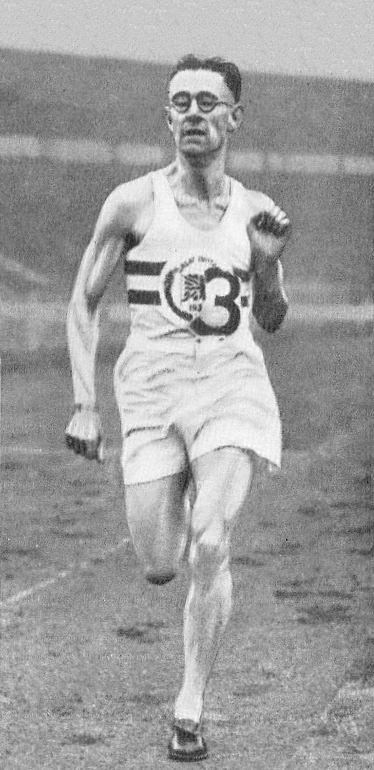

Personal information
- Born: 30 August 1914 Camberwell, County of London, England
- Died: 21 December 2006 (aged 92) Wareham, Dorset, England
- Height: 1.68 m (5 ft 6 in)
- Weight: 56 kg (123 lb)

Sport
- Sport: Athletics
- Event: 400–5000 m
- Club: Blackheath Harriers

Achievements and titles
- Personal bests: 440 yd – 49.3 (1938); 800 m – 1:48.4 (1938); 1500 m – 3:48.4 (1945); Mile – 4:04.2 (1945); 5000 m – 14:08.6 (1946)
Medal record
Men's athletics
Representing England
British Empire Games
Silver medal – second place	1934 London	1 mile
Representing Great Britain
European Championships
Gold medal – first place	1938 Paris	1500 metres
Gold medal – first place	1946 Oslo	5000 metres

Sydney Charles Wooderson MBE (30 August 1914 – 21 December 2006), dubbed "The Mighty Atom", was an English athlete whose peak career was in the 1930s and 1940s.

He set the world mile record of 4:06.4 at London's Motspur Park on 28 August 1937. This record stood for nearly five years.

== Biography ==
Born in Camberwell, London, he was 5 ft 6 in and weighed less than 9 stone (126 lbs). He attended Sutton Valence School, Kent. At 18 he became the first British schoolboy to break 4min 30sec for the mile. He won the British mile title for the five years up to the outbreak of the war in 1939. In 1934 he won the silver medal in the one mile event at the British Empire Games.

At the 1936 Summer Olympics in Berlin, he suffered an ankle injury and failed to qualify for the 1500 metres final. However, in 1937, after surgery, his performance increased and culminated in his world mile record of 4:06.4 in 1937. In 1938 he set world records in the 800 m and 880 yards with times of 1:48.4 and 1:49.2, respectively.

Wooderson won five consecutive 1 mile titles at the prestigious AAA Championships, winning the title in 1935, 1936, 1937, 1938 and 1939.

Off the track Wooderson was a City of London solicitor and missed the 1938 Empire Games in Sydney because he was taking his law finals.

His poor eyesight ruled him out of active service during the Second World War. He joined the Royal Pioneer Corps and was a firefighter during the Blitz and then later, in the Royal Electrical and Mechanical Engineers as a radar operator. In 1944, he spent several months in hospital suffering from rheumatic fever and was warned by doctors he might never run again.

Immediately after the war, however, in 1945, he ran his fastest mile, 4:04.2, just behind Arne Andersson of Sweden. Wooderson became the British 3 mile champion at the 1946 AAA Championships and shortly afterwards in Oslo at the 1946 European Athletics Championships, he won the 5,000 m in 14:08.6, the second-fastest time to that point. His versatility was demonstrated when he won the English National Cross Country Championships title in 1948.

He was the natural choice to carry the Olympic torch into Wembley Stadium for the 1948 Summer Olympics. However he was turned away at the last minute because members of the organising committee wanted a more handsome final runner. They chose the relatively unknown John Mark instead.

He was appointed a Member of the Order of the British Empire (MBE) in the 2000 Birthday Honours for services to Blackheath Harriers and athletics.

Wooderson lived in retirement in Dorset in the South of England. He remained a life member of Blackheath Harriers and was twice its president. He died on Thursday 21 December 2006 in a nursing home at Wareham, Dorset. His ashes are interred in the churchyard of Lady St. Mary's Church, Wareham.

In 2018 a biography of Wooderson was published – Sydney Wooderson: A Very British Hero by Rob Hadgraft.

Records
Preceded by (United States) Elroy Robinson	Men's 800 metres World Record Holder; 20 August 1938 – 15 June 1939	Succeeded by (Germany) Rudolf Harbig
Preceded by (United States) Glenn Cunningham	Men's Mile World Record Holder; 28 August 1937 – 1 July 1942	Succeeded by (Sweden) Gunder Hägg
Preceded by (United Kingdom) Tommy Hampson	European Record Holder Men's 800m 20 August 1938 – 14 July 1939	Succeeded by (Germany) Rudolf Harbig
