= Robert Goix =

French middle-distance runner

Personal information
- Nationality: French
- Born: 7 January 1906
- Died: 15 July 1983 (aged 77)

Sport
- Sport: Middle-distance running
- Event: 1500 metres

Robert Goix (7 January 1906 – 15 July 1983) was a French middle-distance runner. He competed in the men's 1500 metres at the 1936 Summer Olympics.
