= Luigi Beccali =

Italian track runner

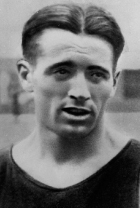

Personal information
- Born: 19 November 1907 Milan, Kingdom of Italy
- Died: 29 August 1990 (aged 82) Rapallo, Italy
- Height: 1.69 m (5 ft 7 in)
- Weight: 63 kg (139 lb)

Sport
- Sport: Middle-distance running
- Club: Pro Patria Milano
- Coached by: Dino Nai
Medal record
Men's athletics
Representing Italy
Olympic Games
Gold medal – first place	1932 Los Angeles	1500 m
Bronze medal – third place	1936 Berlin	1500 m
European Championships
Gold medal – first place	1934 Turin	1500 m
Bronze medal – third place	1938 Paris	1500 m

Luigi Beccali (19 November 1907 – 29 August 1990) was the first Italian to win an Olympic gold medal in running, in the 1500 metres at the 1932 Summer Olympics, and the first Italian to win a European Championship title in athletics.

== Biography ==
Born in Milan, Luigi Beccali, as a youth, was fascinated by cycling and track and field athletics, but choose the latter, when he met the coach Dino Nai.

Luigi Beccali, an Italian champion in 1500 m from 1928 to 1931, became a national hero overnight when he won the Olympic 1500 m gold at Los Angeles.

Beccali finished third behind Reg Thomas in the 1 mile event at the British 1930 AAA Championships.

In 1933, Beccali ran three world records. At first he equalled Jules Ladoumègue's world record 3:49.2, then lowered it to 3:49.0. At the end of the year he also set the 1,000 yd (910 m) world record of 2:10.0.

Beccali won the 1500 m at the first European Championships in 1934, but was outrun by Jack Lovelock at the 1936 Summer Olympics, settling for third place in 1500 m. He was again third in 1500 m at the European Championships in 1938. He also won the Italian championships from 1934 to 1938 in 1500 m and at 1935 in the 5000 m.

Beccali was originally a council surveyor, responsible for road maintenance. His work schedule allowed him to train twice a day. He eventually moved to the United States, and retired from running there in 1941, becoming a wine trader.

== See also ==
- Walk of Fame of Italian sport
- FIDAL Hall of Fame

Records
Preceded by Jules Ladoumegue	Men's 1,500 m World Record Holder; 9 October 1933 – 30 June 1934	Succeeded by Bill Bonthron
Preceded by Jules Ladoumegue	European Record Holder Men's 1500m 9 September 1933 – 2 October 1937	Succeeded by Miklós Szabó
