= Eric Ny =

Swedish middle-distance runner

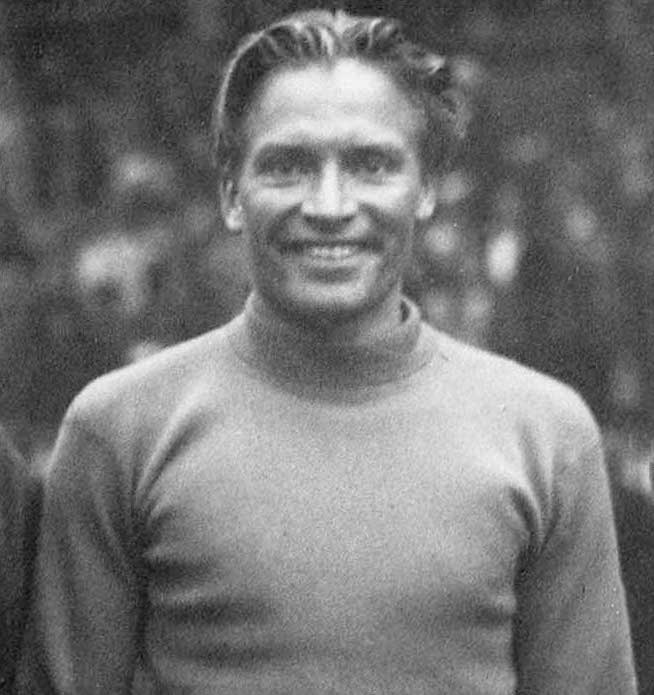

Personal information
- Born: 15 October 1909 Sala, Sweden
- Died: 2 September 1945 (aged 35) Mälaren, Sweden
- Height: 1.76 m (5 ft 9 in)
- Weight: 60 kg (130 lb)

Sport
- Sport: Athletics
- Event: 1500 m
- Club: IK Mode, Stockholm

Achievements and titles
- Personal best(s): 800 m – 1:50.4 (1934); 1500 m – 3:50.8 (1934)

Eric Oscar Sigvard Ny (15 October 1909 – 2 September 1945) was a Swedish middle-distance runner. He competed in the 1500 m event at the 1932 and 1936 Summer Olympics and finished in fifth and eleventh place, respectively. He placed fourth in the 800 m at the 1934 European Championships. Ny died in a sailing accident, aged 35.
