= Glenn Cunningham (runner) =

American middle-distance runner (1909-1988)

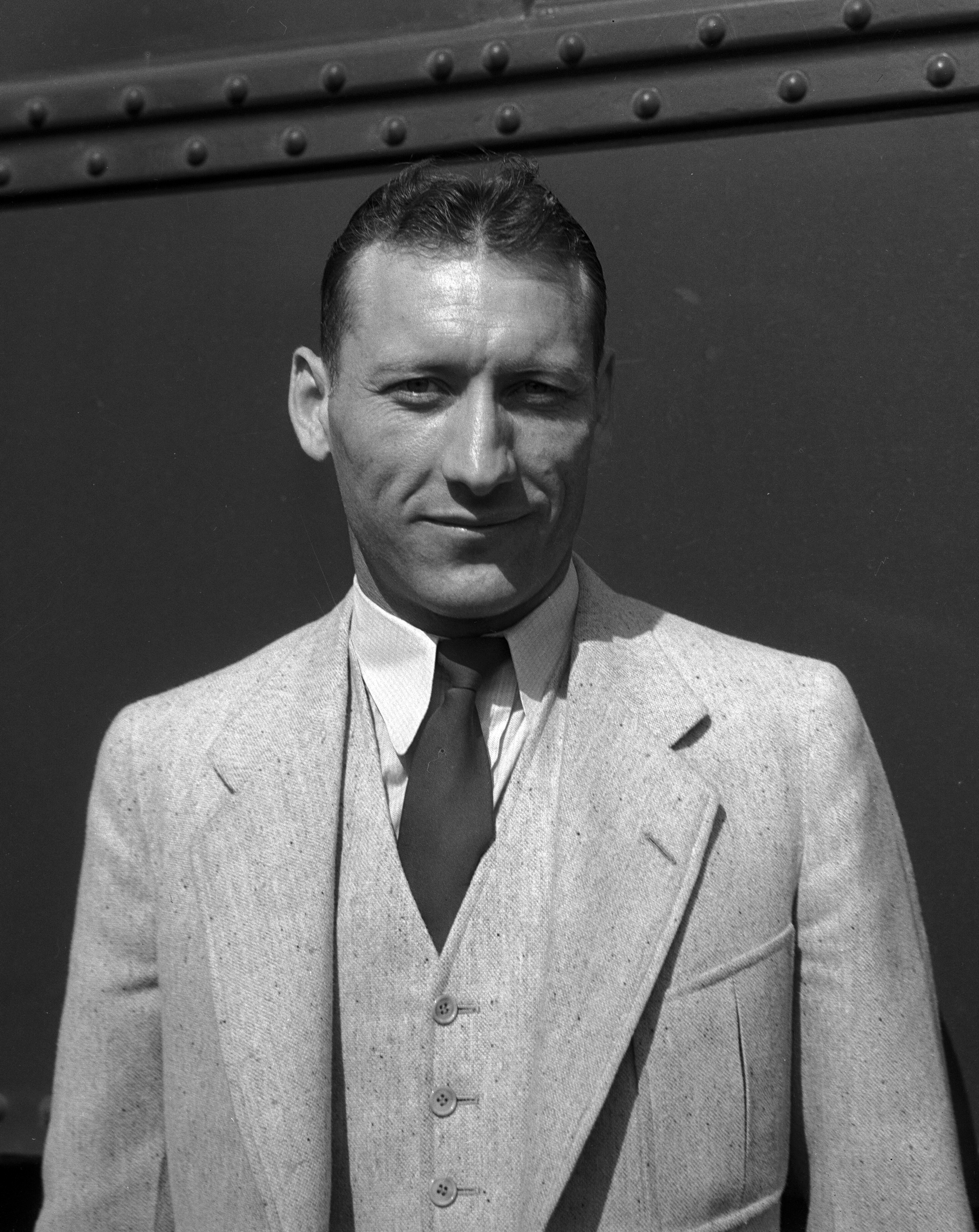
- Cunningham in 1934

Personal information
- Full name: Glenn Vernice Cunningham
- Born: August 4, 1909 Atlanta, Kansas, U.S.
- Died: March 10, 1988 (aged 78) Menifee, Arkansas, U.S.
- Height: 5 ft 10 in (178 cm)
- Weight: 154 lb (70 kg)

Sport
- Country: United States
- Sport: Athletics
- Events: 800 m, 1500 m, mile
- Team: University of Kansas
- Retired: 1940

Achievements and titles
- Highest world ranking: 1st
- Personal bests: 800 m – 1:49.7 (1936); 1500 m – 3:48.2 (1940); Mile – 4:04.4 (1938)
Medal record
Representing the United States
Olympic Games
Silver medal – second place	1936 Berlin	1,500 m

Glenn Vernice Cunningham (August 4, 1909 – March 10, 1988) was an American middle-distance runner, and was considered the greatest American miler of all time. He received the James E. Sullivan Award as the top amateur athlete in the United States in 1933.

== Early life ==
Cunningham was born in Atlanta, Kansas and grew up in Elkhart, Kansas. When he was eight years old, his legs were very badly burned in an explosion caused by his brother accidentally putting gasoline instead of kerosene in the stove at his school, due to a ladies meeting held the night before, and the embers still smoldering in the stove. The fuel container normally contained kerosene. The Ladies group filled it with gasoline. His brother Floyd, 13, died days after the fire. When the doctors recommended amputating Glenn's legs, he was so distressed his parents would not allow it. The doctors predicted he might never walk normally again. He had lost all the flesh on his knees and shins and all the toes on his left foot. Also, his transverse arch was practically destroyed. However, his great determination, coupled with hours upon hours of a new type of therapy, enabled him to gradually regain the ability to walk and to proceed to run. It was in the early summer of 1919 when he first tried to walk again, roughly two years after the accident. He had a positive attitude as well as a strong religious faith. His favorite Bible verse was Isaiah 40:31: "But those who wait on the Lord shall renew their strength; they shall mount up with wings like eagles, they shall run and not be weary, they shall walk and not be faint." The Cunningham Family Motto (and title of his book), "Never Quit".

== Accomplishments ==
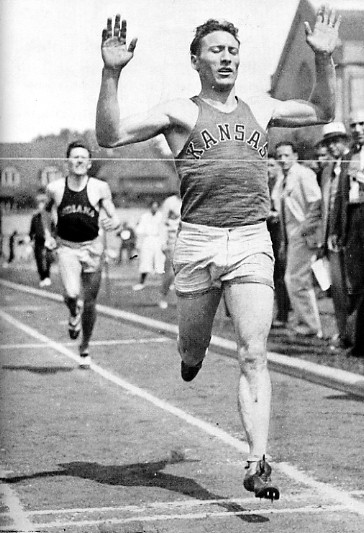
Cunningham competing for the University of Kansas

Cunningham competed in the 1500 m event at the 1932 and 1936 Summer Olympics and finished fourth and second, respectively. While on the ship, traveling from the U.S. to Germany in 1936, he was voted "Most Popular Athlete" by his fellow Olympians.

Cunningham won the Sullivan medal in 1933 for his achievements in middle-distance running. In 1934, he set the world record for the mile run at 4:06.8, which stood for three years. He also set world records in the 800 m in 1936 and in the indoor mile in 1938. Also in 1938, Cunningham set a personal best time in the mile run at 4:04.4 testing Dartmouth College's Alumni Gymnasium indoor track, engineered to allow faster times than most indoor facilities. This time was not accepted as a world record, however, because Dartmouth had provided Cunningham pacing runners, which was against the rules at the time.

Cunningham's unachieved goal was a four-minute mile, a goal attempted and unmet by many other runners. Several theorists proclaimed it was impossible physiologically for humans. Some athletes tried running steady and fast-paced the whole time. Others tried to go steady for the first half then give it all they had. Glenn worried about the strength of his legs burned in his youth, so he started slow – running in the pack. He would be fresher in the second half – and would almost be sprinting the last 100 yards to the finish.

Cunningham has a park named after him in his hometown of Elkhart, Kansas. The mile run at the Kansas Relays is named in his honor. In 1974 he was inducted into the National Track and Field Hall of Fame. In 2012, Cunningham was posthumously inducted in to the National Distance Running Hall of Fame.

== Retirement ==
Cunningham earned a master's degree from the University of Iowa and a PhD from New York University. After retiring from competitions in 1940 he served as director of physical education at Cornell College in Iowa for four years. Later he opened the Glenn Cunningham Youth Ranch in Kansas, where he and his wife helped 10,000 needy and abused children.

Records
Preceded by (United Kingdom) Tommy Hampson (United States) Ben Eastman	Men's 800 metres World Record Holder; August 8, 1936 – July 11, 1937	Succeeded by (United States) Elroy Robinson
Preceded by (New Zealand) Jack Lovelock	Men's Mile World Record Holder; June 16, 1934 – August 28, 1937	Succeeded by (United Kingdom) Sydney Wooderson
