= 1938 European Athletics Championships – Women's 100 metres =

Women's 100 metres at the 1938 European Athletics Championships
- Venue: Praterstadion
- Location: Vienna
- Dates: 17 September
- Competitors: 21 from 10 nations
- Winning time: 11.9

Medalists
| gold medal | Stanisława Walasiewicz | Poland |
| silver medal | Käthe Krauß | Germany |
| bronze medal | Fanny Blankers-Koen | Netherlands |

The women's 100 metres at the 1938 European Athletics Championships was held in Vienna, at the time part of German Reich, at Praterstadion on 17 September 1938.

== Participation ==
According to an unofficial count, 21 athletes from 10 countries participated in the event.

- Belgium (1)
- Estonia (2)
- Germany (3)
- Hungary (3)
- Latvia (1)
- Netherlands (1)
- Norway (3)
- Poland (3)
- Sweden (1)
- Great Britain (3)

== Results ==
=== Heats ===
17 September

==== Heat 1 ====
| Rank | Name | Nationality | Time | Notes |
|---|---|---|---|---|
| 1 | Stanisława Walasiewicz | Poland | 11.9 | CR, Q |
| 2 | Betty Lock | Great Britain | 12.3 | Q |
| 3 | Anna Van Rossum | Belgium | 13.4 | |
| 4 | Ella Undli | Norway | 13.6 | |

==== Heat 2 ====
| Rank | Name | Nationality | Time | Notes |
|---|---|---|---|---|
| 1 | Käthe Krauß | Germany | 12.4 | Q |
| 2 | Rózalia Nagy | Hungary | 13.2 | Q |
| 3 | Ilse Uus | Estonia | 13.4 | |

==== Heat 3 ====
| Rank | Name | Nationality | Time | Notes |
|---|---|---|---|---|
| 1 | Fanny Blankers-Koen | Netherlands | 12.2 | Q |
| 2 | Audrey Brown | Great Britain | 12.3 | Q |
| 3 | Aashild Brandvold | Norway | 13.2 | |
| 4 | Barbara Książkiewicz | Poland | 99.9 | |
| 5 | Alma Parmson | Estonia | 99.9 | |

==== Heat 4 ====
| Rank | Name | Nationality | Time | Notes |
|---|---|---|---|---|
| 1 | Ida Ehrl | Germany | 12.3 | Q |
| 2 | Dorothy Saunders | Great Britain | 12.4 | Q |
| 3 | Alida Niklase | Latvia | 13.2 | |
| 4 | Sarolta Fehér | Hungary | 13.6 | |

==== Heat 5 ====
| Rank | Name | Nationality | Time | Notes |
|---|---|---|---|---|
| 1 | Martha Wretman | Sweden | 12.4 | Q |
| 2 | Siegfrid Sivertsen | Norway | 12.7 | Q |
| 3 | Otylia Kałuża | Poland | 13.2 | |

==== Heat 6 ====
| Rank | Name | Nationality | Time | Notes |
|---|---|---|---|---|
| 1 | Emmy Albus | Germany | 12.6 | Q |
| 2 | Ilona Balla | Hungary | 13.0 | Q |

=== Semi-finals ===
17 September

==== Semi-final 1 ====
| Rank | Name | Nationality | Time | Notes |
|---|---|---|---|---|
| 1 | Stanisława Walasiewicz | Poland | 11.9 | CR, Q |
| 2 | Emmy Albus | Germany | 12.3 | Q |
| 3 | Dorothy Saunders | Great Britain | 12.3 | Q |
| 4 | Audrey Brown | Great Britain | 12.4 | |
| 5 | Rózalia Nagy | Hungary | 13.0 | |
| 6 | Siegfrid Sivertsen | Norway | 13.0 | |

==== Semi-final 2 ====
| Rank | Name | Nationality | Time | Notes |
|---|---|---|---|---|
| 1 | Käthe Krauß | Germany | 12.0 | Q |
| 2 | Fanny Blankers-Koen | Netherlands | 12.1 | Q |
| 3 | Ida Ehrl | Germany | 12.3 | Q |
| 4 | Betty Lock | Great Britain | 12.5 | |
| 5 | Ilona Balla | Hungary | 13.2 | |
| | Martha Wretman | Sweden | DNF | |

=== Final ===
17 September

| Rank | Name | Nationality | Time | Notes |
|---|---|---|---|---|
| 1st place, gold medalist(s) | Stanisława Walasiewicz | Poland | 11.9 | CR |
| 2nd place, silver medalist(s) | Käthe Krauß | Germany | 12.0 | |
| 3rd place, bronze medalist(s) | Fanny Blankers-Koen | Netherlands | 12.0 | |
| 4 | Dorothy Saunders | Great Britain | 12.3 | |
| 5 | Ida Ehrl | Germany | 12.3 | |
| 6 | Emmy Albus | Germany | 12.4 | |
