= Nel van Balen Blanken =

Nelly van Balen Blanken
Personal information
- Full name: Petronella Blaauboer-van Balen Blanken
- Born: 18 November 1917 Anna Paulowna, Netherlands
- Died: 29 October 2008 (aged 90) Schagen, Netherlands

Sport
- Sport: Athletics
- Club: Sagitta
Medal record
Representing Netherlands
European Championships
Silver medal – second place	1938 Vienna	high jump

Petronella "Nelly"/"Nel" Blaauboer-van Balen Blanken, (née van Balen) with surname also spelled as Blauwboer and Blauwbos (18 November 1917 – 29 October 2008) was a Dutch athlete, who competed in the high jump, long jump and hurdles in the late 1930s and 1940s. She was awarded the Sauer Cup, the Dutch athlete of the year award, for her performances in 1938. She was a member of the athletics club Sagitta and represented the Netherlands at international competitions. Fanny Blankers-Koen was a member of the same club in the same period. She became the silver high jump medalist at the 1938 European Athletics Championships.

== Career ==
One of her first main international achievement was in 1937, when Van Balen won the high jump event in an international competition against Germany.

Van Balen Blanken won the silver medal at the 1938 European Athletics Championships in the high jump event. In October 1938 she became the European record holder in the high jump, after the record was taken from record holder Dora Ratjen who turned out to be a male in a medical research.

During her career Van Balen Blanken won many medals at the National Championships. She became the national champion in 1938 ahead of Fanny Blankers-Koen. In 1940 she won silver medals in the long jump and high jump, both behind Blankers-Koen. At the 1943 national championships she became the national champion in the high jump and 80 metres.

She continued competing after her marriage. Her last reported achievements, including competing still at international competitions, are from 1948.

== Personal life ==
Van Balen Blanken was born on 18 November 1917 in Anna Paulowna. After the death of her husband Jacob Blaauboer, she died on 29 October 2008 in Schagen at the age of 90.

Awards
Preceded by Fanny Koen	Sauer Cup; 1938	Succeeded by Jan Brasser
