= 1938 European Athletics Championships – Women's 200 metres =

Women's 200 metres at the European Athletics Championships

The women's 200 metres at the 1938 European Athletics Championships was held in Vienna, at the time part of German Reich, at Praterstadion on 18 September 1938.

== Medalists ==
Gold	Stanisława Walasiewicz; Poland
Silver	Käthe Krauß; Germany
Bronze	Fanny Blankers-Koen; Netherlands

== Results ==
=== Final ===
18 September

Rank	Name	Nationality	Time	Notes
1st place, gold medalist(s)	Stanisława Walasiewicz	Poland	23.8	CR
2nd place, silver medalist(s)	Käthe Krauß	Germany	24.4	NR
3rd place, bronze medalist(s)	Fanny Blankers-Koen	Netherlands	24.9	
4	Ida Ehrl	Germany	25.0	
5	Dorothy Saunders	Great Britain	25.0	
6	Leonard Chalmers	Great Britain	25.0	

=== Semi-finals ===
18 September

==== Semi-final 1 ====
Rank	Name	Nationality	Time	Notes
1	Stanisława Walasiewicz	Poland	24.2	CR, Q
2	Ida Ehrl	Germany	24.7	Q
3	Audrey Brown	Great Britain	25.6	
4	Alida Niklase	Latvia	26.2	
5	Rózalia Nagy	Hungary	27.0	NR
6	Solveig Toms	Norway	99.9	

==== Semi-final 2 ====
Rank	Name	Nationality	Time	Notes
1	Fanny Blankers-Koen	Netherlands	25.0	Q
2	Leonard Chalmers	Great Britain	25.1	Q
3	Dorle Voigt	Germany	25.2	
4	Otylia Kałuża	Poland	26.4	
5	Anna Van Rossum	Belgium	28.1	

==== Semi-final 3 ====
Rank	Name	Nationality	Time	Notes
1	Dorothy Saunders	Great Britain	25.3	Q
2	Käthe Krauß	Germany	25.4	Q
3	Martha Wretman	Sweden	26.0	
4	Jadwiga Gawrońska	Poland	27.2	
5	Jeanne Pousset	Belgium	27.5	

== Participation ==
According to an unofficial count, 16 athletes from 9 countries participated in the event.

- Belgium (2)
- Germany (3)
- Hungary (1)
- Latvia (1)
- Netherlands (1)
- Norway (1)
- Poland (3)
- Sweden (1)
- Great Britain (3)
