= Solms (surname) =

Solms is a surname. Notable people with the surname include:

- Feodora Schenk (née Solms, 1920–2006), Austrian athlete
- Hermann Otto Solms (born 1940), German politician
- Mark Solms (born 1961), South African psychoanalyst and neuropsychologist
