= 1950 European Athletics Championships – Women's 100 metres =

Women's 100 metres at the 1950 European Athletics Championships
- Venue: Heysel Stadium
- Location: Brussels
- Dates: 24 August (heats); 25 August (final)
- Competitors: 15 from 7 nations
- Winning time: 11.7

Medalists
gold medal	Fanny Blankers-Koen	Netherlands
silver medal	Yevgeniya Sechenova	Soviet Union
bronze medal	June Foulds	Great Britain

The women's 100 metres at the 1950 European Athletics Championships was held in Brussels, Belgium, at Heysel Stadium on 24 and 25 August 1950.

== Participation ==
According to an unofficial count, 15 athletes from 7 countries participated in the event.

- Belgium (2)
- France (2)
- Italy (1)
- Netherlands (3)
- Soviet Union (3)
- Switzerland (1)
- Great Britain (3)

== Results ==
=== Heats ===
24 August

==== Heat 1 ====
Wind: 0.0 m/s

Rank	Name	Nationality	Time	Notes
1	Fanny Blankers-Koen	Netherlands	11.7	CR, Q
2	June Foulds	Great Britain	12.2	Q
3	Yvette Monginou	France	12.6	
4	Gertrud Heusser	Switzerland	13.4	
	Sofya Malshina	Soviet Union	DQ	

==== Heat 2 ====
Wind: +0.4 m/s

Rank	Name	Nationality	Time	Notes
1	Zoya Dukhovich	Soviet Union	12.3	Q
2	Elspeth Hay	Great Britain	12.5	Q
3	Grietje de Jongh	Netherlands	12.5	
4	Josette Demeuter	Belgium	13.4	

==== Heat 3 ====
Wind: -1.9 m/s

Rank	Name	Nationality	Time	Notes
1	Yevgeniya Sechenova	Soviet Union	12.4	Q
2	Colette Aitelli	France	12.5	Q
3	Dorothy Hall	Great Britain	12.5	
4	Xenia Stad-de Jong	Netherlands	12.6	
5	Vittoria Cesarini	Italy	12.8	
6	Anna Van Rossum	Belgium	13.7	

=== Final ===
25 August Wind: +0.7 m/s

Rank	Name	Nationality	Time	Notes
1st place, gold medalist(s)	Fanny Blankers-Koen	Netherlands	11.7	CR
2nd place, silver medalist(s)	Yevgeniya Sechenova	Soviet Union	12.3	
3rd place, bronze medalist(s)	June Foulds	Great Britain	12.4	
4	Zoya Dukhovich	Soviet Union	12.4	
5	Elspeth Hay	Great Britain	12.5	
6	Colette Aitelli	France	12.5	
