= Hermine Schröder =

German athletics competitor

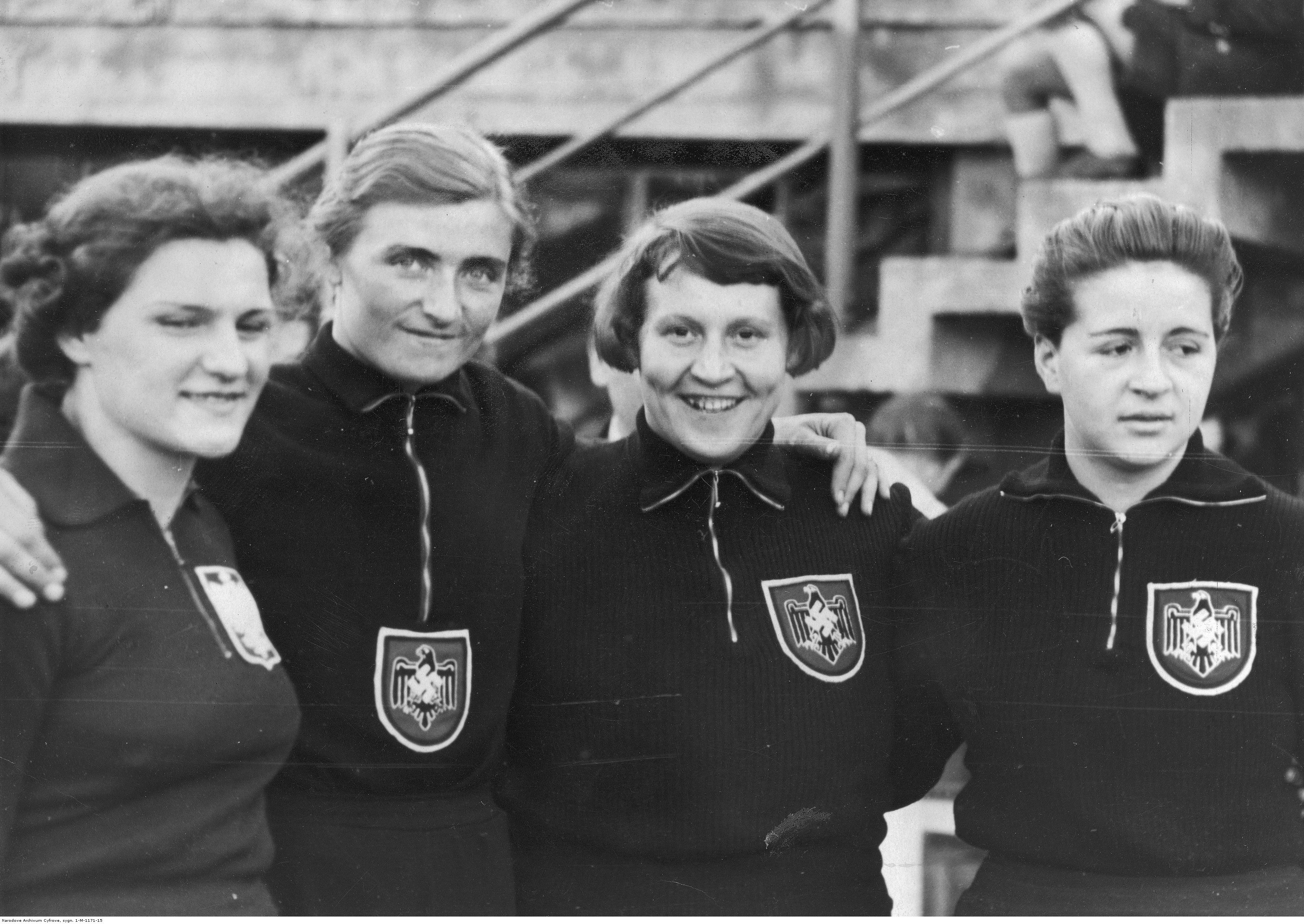
- Hermine Schröder 1938 European Athletics Championships (medalists shot put women: (left to right) Wanda Flakowicz (bronze), Gisela Mauermayer (silver), Schröder (gold), Helma Wessel (4.th)

Medal record

Women's athletics

Representing Germany

European Championships
| Gold medal – first place | 1938 Vienna | Shot put |

Hermine Schröder (née Wüst; 12 February 1911 – 9 August 1978) was a German track and field athlete who competed mainly in the shot put. She was the gold medallist in the event at the European Athletics Championships in 1938 and set her personal best of 14.09 m (46 ft 2 1/2 in) that same year.

Born in Ludwigshafen, she became a member of the VTV Mundenheim 1883 club and rose to national prominence in the early 1930s, having a runner-up finish in the shot put at the German Athletics Championships in 1931 (behind Grete Heublein), before taking national titles in 1932 and 1933. The event was dropped from the national programme in 1935 in line with the Olympic programme of the time, and was only restored in 1937. From 1934 to 1939 Schröder was the second ranked shot putter in Germany behind Gisela Mauermayer (who had won shot put gold at the 1934 Women's World Games and discus gold at the 1936 Summer Olympics).

In spite of her regularly placing second in domestic competition, she frequently led the world on performance and was the number one ranked shot putter from 1932 to 1933 and again from 1935 to 1939. German women led the event during this period, with Heublein and Mauermayer being the ones to disrupt her reign. In her sole major international outing she edged Mauermayer to the gold medal at the 1938 European Athletics Championships by two centimetres to become the first ever European women's champion in the event. She ranked within the world top ten in 1940 and 1941, but upon entering her thirties her career came to a close during World War II.

== Personal bests ==
- Shot put: 14.09 m (46 ft 2 1/2 in) (1938)
- Discus throw: 40.53 m (132 ft 11 1/2 in) (1935)

== National titles ==
- German Athletics Championships
  - Shot put: 1932, 1933

== International competitions ==
| Year | Competition | Venue | Position | Event | Notes |
|---|---|---|---|---|---|
| 1938 | European Championships | Vienna, German Reich | 1st | Shot put | 13.29 m CR |

== See also ==
- List of European Athletics Championships medalists (women)
