= Henryka Słomczewska-Nowak =

Polish sportswoman (1915–1998)

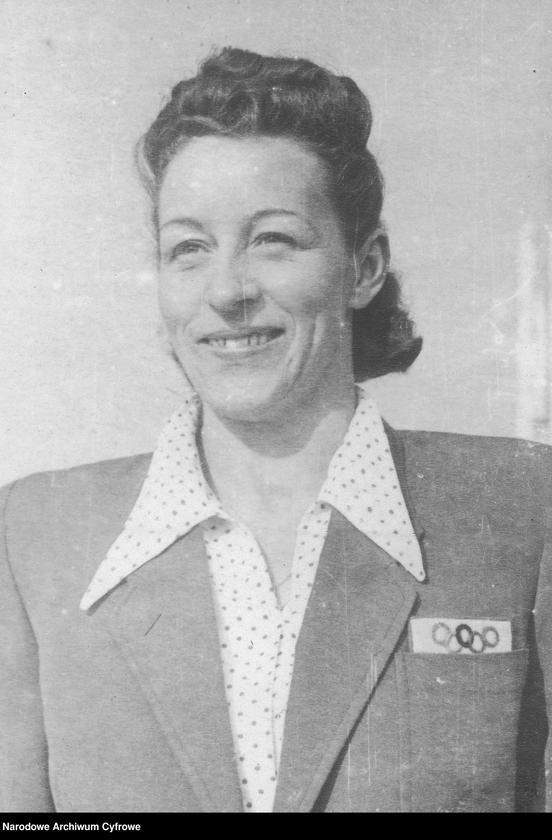
- 1948

Personal information
- Nationality: Polish
- Born: 25 April 1915 Łódź, Congress Poland
- Died: 12 June 1998 (aged 83) Łódź, Poland
- Height: 1.65 m (5 ft 5 in)
- Weight: 59 kg (130 lb)

Sport
- Sport: Athletics
- Event: Long jump
- Club: WIMA Łódź (1933-1937); IKP Łódź (1937-1939)

Henryka Słomczewska (married names Nowak and later Mitianiec; 25 April 1915 – 12 June 1998) was a Polish athlete and handball player. She competed in the women's long jump at the 1948 Summer Olympics.

== International competitions ==
Year	Competition	Venue	Position	Event	Notes
Representing Poland
1938	European Championships	Vienna, Germany*	8th	Long jump	5.15 m
1948	Olympic Games	London, United Kingdom	18th (q)	Long jump	5.190 m

*Now Austria.

== Personal bests ==
- 50 metres – 7.2h (Przemyśl 1939)
- 60 metres – 8.2h (Łódź 1938)
- 100 metres – 13.2h (Łódź 1938)
- 200 metres – 29.0h (Pabianice 1933)
- High jump – 1.415 metres (Łódź 1937)
- Long jump – 5.52 metres (Bergamo 1939)
- Standing long jump – 2.32 metres (Łódź 1939)
- Javelin throw (old model) – 26.10 metres (Łódź 1935)
