= 1938 European Athletics Championships – Women's 4 × 100 metres relay =

Women's 4 × 100 metres relay at the European Athletics Championships

The women's 4 × 100 metres relay at the 1938 European Athletics Championships was held in Vienna, at the time part of German Reich, at Praterstadion on 18 September 1938.

== Medalists ==
| Gold | Josefine Kohl; Käthe Krauß; Emmy Albus; Ida Kühnel; Germany |
| Silver | Barbara Książkiewicz; Otylia Kałuża; Jadwiga Gawrońska; Stanisława Walasiewicz; Poland |
| Bronze | Maria Alfero; Maria Apollonio; Rosetta Cattaneo; Italia Lucchini; Italy |

== Results ==
=== Final ===
18 September

| Rank | Nation | Competitors | Time | Notes |
|---|---|---|---|---|
| 1st place, gold medalist(s) | Germany | Josefine Kohl; Käthe Krauß; Emmy Albus; Ida Kühnel | 46.8 | CR |
| 2nd place, silver medalist(s) | Poland | Barbara Książkiewicz; Otylia Kałuża; Jadwiga Gawrońska; Stanisława Walasiewicz | 48.2 | |
| 3rd place, bronze medalist(s) | Italy | Maria Alfero; Maria Apollonio; Rosetta Cattaneo; Italia Lucchini | 49.4 | |
| 4 | Hungary | Ilona Balla; Anna Lörinczi; Sarolta Fehér; Rózalia Nagy | 50.8 | |
| 5 | Norway | Ella Undli; Aashild Brandvold; Solveig Wennewold; Sigrid Sivertsen | 51.1 | |
| | Great Britain | Leonard Chalmers; Audrey Brown; Dorothy Saunders; Betty Lock | DQ | |

== Participation ==
According to an unofficial count, 24 athletes from 6 countries participated in the event. The fourth member of the Norwegian relay team is unknown.

- Germany (4)
- Hungary (4)
- Italy (4)
- Norway (4)
- Poland (4)
- Great Britain (4)
