= Jan Blankers =

Dutch athlete and coach

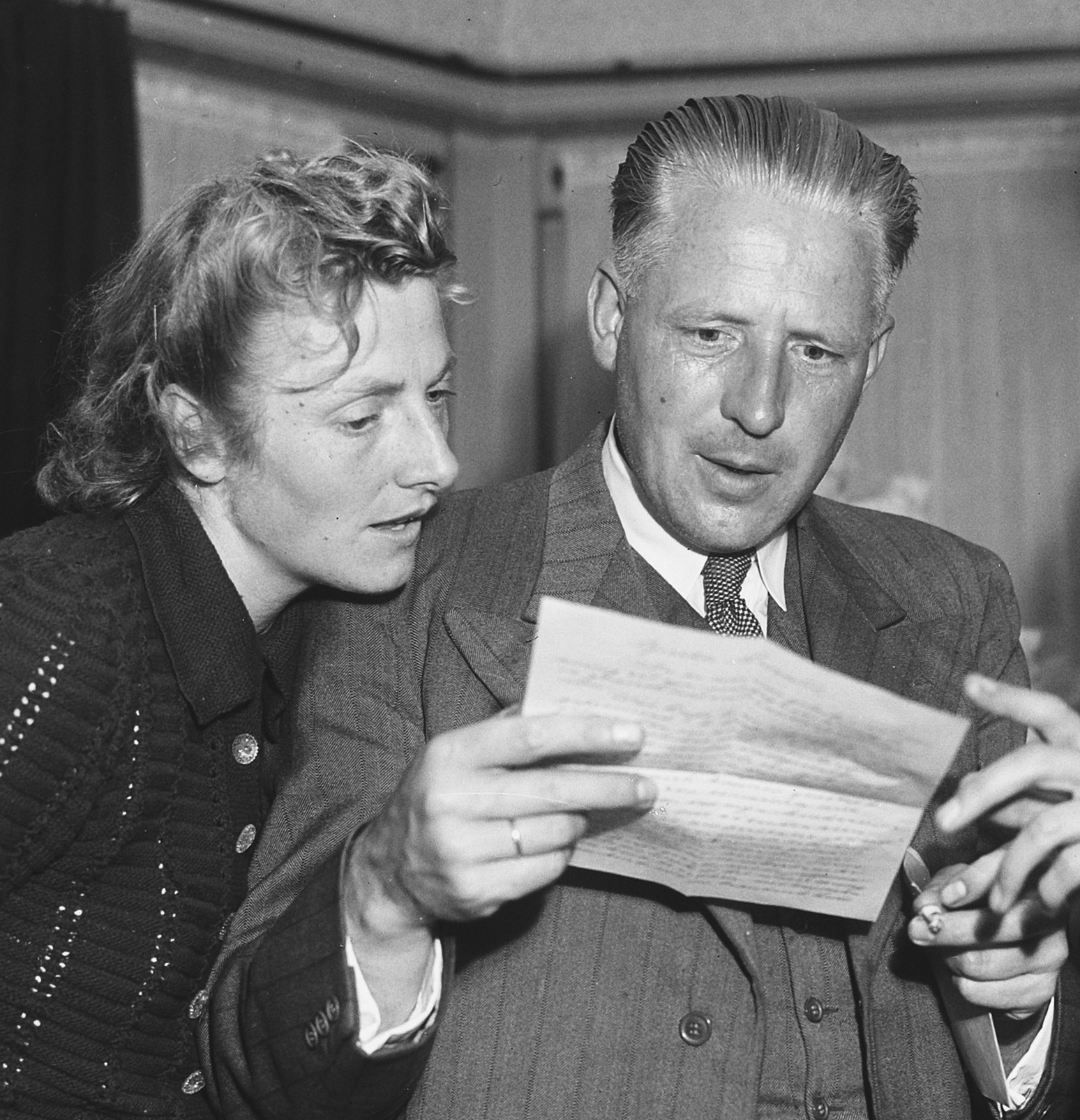
- Fanny and Jan Blankers in 1948

Personal information
- Born: Johan Blankers; 23 April 1904 Amsterdam, Netherlands
- Died: 17 July 1977 (aged 73) Vinkeveen en Waverveen, Netherlands

Sport
- Sport: Triple jump
- Club: AV '23, Amsterdam; Sagitta, Amsterdam

Johan "Jan" Blankers (Note: Johan Blankers and Jan Blankers are pronounced [ˈj(oːɦ)ɑm ˈblɑŋkərs]. In isolation, the first name is pronounced [ˈj(oːɦ)ɑn].) (23 April 1904 – 17 July 1977) was a Dutch athlete and coach who competed at the 1928 Summer Olympics.

== Biography ==
Blankers finished third behind fellow Dutchman Willem Peters in the triple jump event at the 1928 AAA Championships. Shortly afterwards he represented the Netherlands at the 1928 Olympic Games in Amsterdam, where he competed in the triple jump, but failed to reach the final. He won the national title in this event in 1931 and 1932, but later tore an Achilles tendon, which resulted in his retirement and in a slight limp for the rest of his life. Blankers also won the British AAA Championships title at the 1931 AAA Championships and the 1933 AAA Championships.

In September 1935, Blankers met Fanny Koen at an athletic competition. He was impressed by her talent, but also noticed faults in her running technique. He eventually became her coach and married her on 29 August 1940. They had a son Jan (born 20 August 1941) and a daughter Fanny (born 12 February 1946).

In 1935, Blankers also became a national athletics coach and prepared the Dutch team for the 1936 Olympics. Soon after, he founded a women's athletics association Sagitta in Amsterdam to promote sports among women. Within a few years Sagitta became the leading women's athletics club in the Netherlands. At the 1938 European Athletics Championships, its members Fanny Blankers-Koen and Nelly van Balen-Blanken won three medals in the sprint and high jump.

Blankers continued working as a coach with the national team and Sagitta through World War II and into the 1940s and 1950s. Besides his wife, his students included Tilly van der Zwaard, Loes Boling and Els van Noorduyn. He spent much of his later life involved with sports journalism.
