= 1950 European Athletics Championships – Women's 80 metres hurdles =

Women's 80 metres hurdles at the European Athletics Championships

The women's 80 metres hurdles at the 1950 European Athletics Championships was held in Brussels, Belgium, at Heysel Stadium on 25 and 26 August 1950.

== Medalists ==
Gold	Fanny Blankers-Koen; Netherlands
Silver	Maureen Dyson; Great Britain
Bronze	Micheline Ostermeyer; France

== Results ==
=== Final ===
26 August Wind: 0.9 m/s

Rank	Name	Nationality	Time	Notes
1st place, gold medalist(s)	Fanny Blankers-Koen	Netherlands	11.1	CR
2nd place, silver medalist(s)	Maureen Dyson	Great Britain	11.6	
3rd place, bronze medalist(s)	Micheline Ostermeyer	France	11.7	
4	Aleksandra Yakusheva	Soviet Union	11.7	
5	Jean Desforges	Great Britain	11.8	
6	Elene Gokieli	Soviet Union	11.8	

=== Heats ===
25 August

==== Heat 1 ====
Wind: 0 m/s

Rank	Name	Nationality	Time	Notes
1	Maureen Dyson	Great Britain	11.5	CR Q
2	Elene Gokieli	Soviet Union	11.8	Q
3	Claudie Flament	France	12.1	
4	Wilhelmina Lust	Netherlands	12.2	
5	Maria Musso	Italy	12.3	

==== Heat 2 ====
Wind: -0.1 m/s

Rank	Name	Nationality	Time	Notes
1	Fanny Blankers-Koen	Netherlands	11.3	CR Q
2	Micheline Ostermeyer	France	11.5	Q
3	Sheila Pratt	Great Britain	12.0	
4	Elfriede Steurer	Austria	12.2	

==== Heat 3 ====
Wind: -0.3 m/s

Rank	Name	Nationality	Time	Notes
1	Jean Desforges	Great Britain	11.7	Q
2	Aleksandra Yakusheva	Soviet Union	11.8	Q
3	Yvette Monginou	France	12.0	
4	Nel de Vos	Netherlands	12.6	
5	Gertrud Heusser	Switzerland	13.3	
6	Jenny van Gerdinge	Belgium	13.5	

== Participation ==
According to an unofficial count, 15 athletes from 8 countries participated in the event.

- Austria (1)
- Belgium (1)
- France (3)
- Italy (1)
- Netherlands (3)
- Soviet Union (2)
- Switzerland (1)
- Great Britain (3)
