= 1938 European Athletics Championships – Women's shot put =

Women's shot put at the European Athletics Championships

The women's shot put at the 1938 European Athletics Championships was held in Vienna, at the time part of the German Reich, at Praterstadion on 17 September 1938.

== Medalists ==
| Gold | Hermine Schröder; Germany |
| Silver | Gisela Mauermayer; Germany |
| Bronze | Wanda Flakowicz; Poland |

== Results ==
=== Final ===
17 September

| Rank | Name | Nationality | Result | Notes |
|---|---|---|---|---|
| 1st place, gold medalist(s) | Hermine Schröder | Germany | 13.29 | CR |
| 2nd place, silver medalist(s) | Gisela Mauermayer | Germany | 13.27 | |
| 3rd place, bronze medalist(s) | Wanda Flakowicz | Poland | 12.55 | |
| 4 | Helma Wessel | Germany | 12.55 | |
| 5 | Bevis Reid | Great Britain | 12.10 | |
| 6 | Ida Lavize | Latvia | 11.70 | |
| 7 | Genowefa Cejzik | Poland | 11.68 | |
| 8 | Irja Lipasti | Finland | 11.64 | |
| 9 | Amelia Piccinini | Italy | 11.30 | |
| 10 | Britta Awall | Sweden | 10.96 | |
| 11 | Ans Niesink | Netherlands | 10.66 | |
| 12 | Kathleen Dyer-Tilley | Great Britain | 10.49 | |

== Participation ==
According to an unofficial count, 12 athletes from 8 countries participated in the event.

- Finland (1)
- Germany (3)
- Italy (1)
- Latvia (1)
- Netherlands (1)
- Poland (2)
- Sweden (1)
- Great Britain (2)
