= Emmy Albus =

German sprinter (1911–1995)

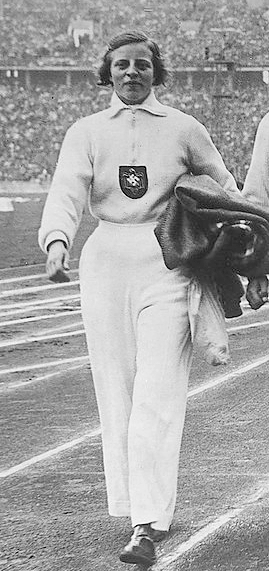
- Emmy Albus at the 1936 Olympics

Personal information
- Born: 13 December 1911 Wuppertal, Germany
- Died: 20 September 1995 (aged 83) Berlin, Germany
- Height: 172 cm (5 ft 8 in)
- Weight: 57 kg (126 lb)

Sport
- Sport: Athletics
- Events: 100 m, 200 m
- Club: Barmer TV 1846, Wuppertal

Achievements and titles
- Personal bests: 100 m – 11.9 (1936); 200 m – 26.0 (1935)
Medal record
Women's athletics
Representing Germany
European Championships
Gold medal – first place	1938 Vienna	4×100 m

Emmy Albus Liersch (13 December 1911 – 20 September 1995) was a German sprinter who won a gold medal in 4 × 100 m relay at the 1938 European Championships, the same year she set a world record in the 4 × 200 m relay.

At the 1936 Berlin Olympics her 4 × 100 m team set a world record in the semifinals and led the final until a missed exchange in the final leg led to the German relay team (also including Käthe Krauß, Marie Dollinger, and Ilse Dörffeldt) being eliminated. Individually, Albus finished sixth in the 100 m event.

At the 1938 European Athletics Championships, Albus finished sixth in the 100 metres in addition to the gold medal in the 4 × 100 metres relay.

In 1958 Albus married Walter Liersch, a fellow German sprinter.
