= 1938 European Athletics Championships – Women's long jump =

Women's long jump at the European Athletics Championships

The women's long jump at the 1938 European Athletics Championships was held in Vienna, at the time part of German Reich, at Praterstadion on 17 September 1938.

== Medalists ==
Gold	Irmgard Praetz; Germany
Silver	Stanisława Walasiewicz; Poland
Bronze	Gisela Voß; Germany

== Results ==
=== Final ===
17 September

Rank	Name	Nationality	Result	Notes
1st place, gold medalist(s)	Irmgard Praetz	Germany	5.88	CR
2nd place, silver medalist(s)	Stanisława Walasiewicz	Poland	5.81	
3rd place, bronze medalist(s)	Gisela Voß	Germany	5.47	
4	Ethel Raby	Great Britain	5.44	
5	Veronika Kohlbach	Germany	5.41	
6	Vedder Schenck	Great Britain	5.34	
7	Inge Schmidt-Nielsen	Denmark	5.27	
8	Henryka Słomczewska	Poland	5.15	
9	Ita Penzo	Italy	5.08	
10	Martha Wretman	Sweden	5.02	
11	Dorothy Cosnett	Great Britain	4.97	
12	Ingrid Hansson	Sweden	4.90	
13	Anna Van Rossum	Belgium	4.75	
14	Jeanne Pousset	Belgium	4.51	
15	Ilse Uus	Estonia	4.25	

== Participation ==
According to an unofficial count, 15 athletes from 8 countries participated in the event.

- Belgium (2)
- Denmark (1)
- Estonia (1)
- Germany (3)
- Italy (1)
- Poland (2)
- Sweden (2)
- Great Britain (3)
