= Grietje de Jongh =

Dutch sprinter (1924–2002)

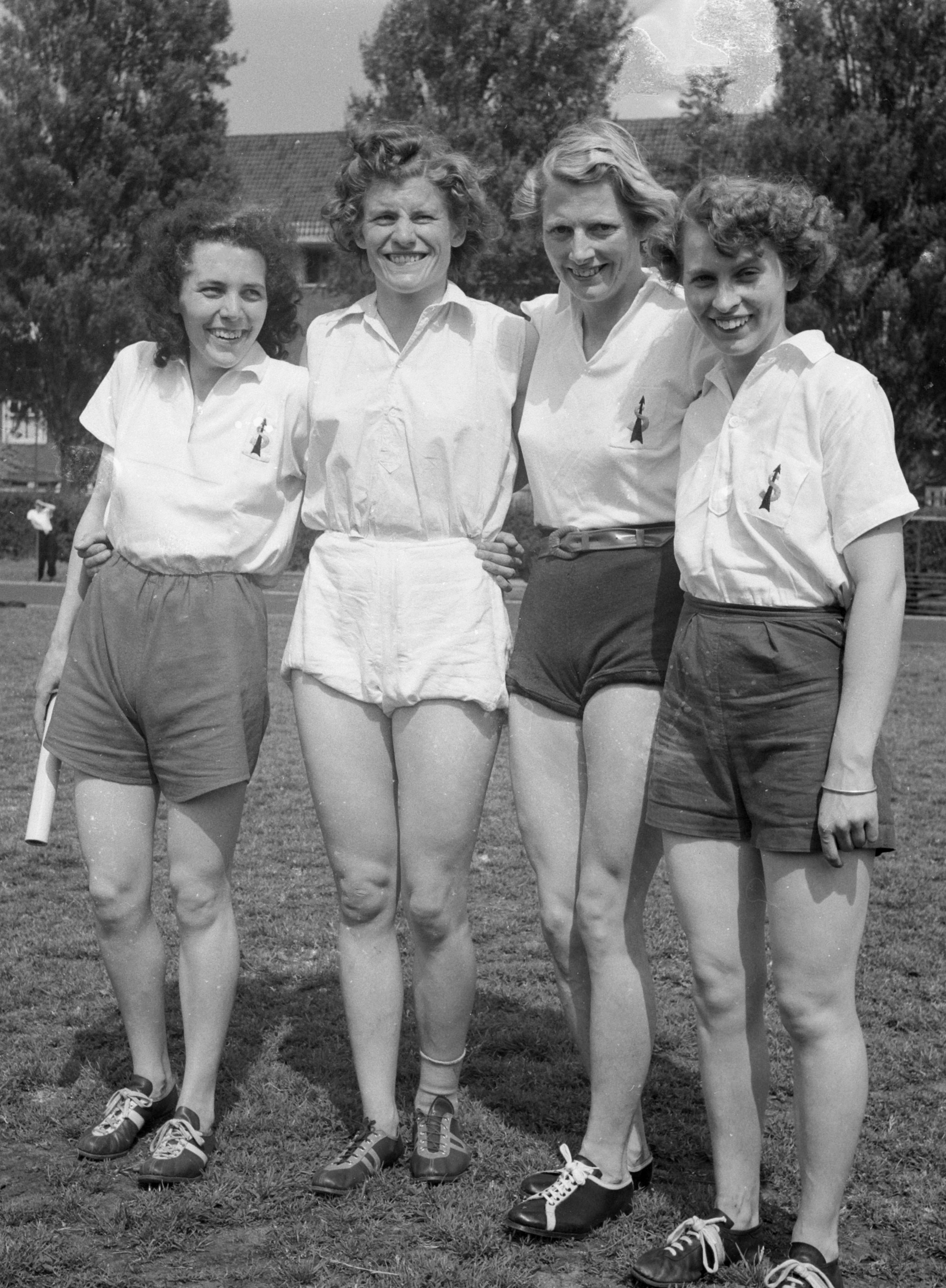
- Nel Büch, Grietje de Jongh, Fanny Blankers-Koen and Ina van Vooren in 1950

Personal information
- Born: 2 November 1924 Oostzaan, the Netherlands
- Died: 6 February 2002 (aged 77)

Sport
- Sport: Sprint
- Club: AV Zaanland, Zaandam, Sagitta, Amsterdam
Medal record
Women's athletics
Representing the Netherlands
European Championships
Silver medal – second place	1950 Brussels	4×100 m

Grietje "Gré" de Jongh (2 November 1924 – 6 February 2002) was a Dutch sprinter. She competed at the 1948 and 1952 Summer Olympics in four events in total: 100 m, 200 m (twice) and 4 × 100 m relay and finished in sixth place in the relay. She won a silver medal in this event at the 1950 European Athletics Championships.
