= Rosetta Cattaneo =

Italian sprinter (1919–1988)

Personal information
- Nationality: Italian
- Born: 14 January 1919 Greco, Italy
- Died: 1988 (aged 69)

Sport
- Country: Italy
- Sport: Athletics
- Event: Sprint
- Club: La Filotecnica Milano

Achievements and titles
- Personal best: 200 m 25.3 (1940)
Medal record
Women's athletics
Representing Italy
European Championships
Bronze medal – third place	1938 Vienna	4×100 m

Rosetta Cattaneo (14 January 1919 – 1988) was an Italian sprinter. She was the italian record holder for women in the 200 metres with the time of 25.3 established in 1940.

== Biography ==
She won a bronze medal in the 4×100 metres relay, the first medal ever for Italian women in a relay race, at the 1938 European Athletics Championships in Vienna, with co-runners Maria Apollonio, Maria Alfero and Italia Lucchini She has 8 caps in national team from 1937 to 1942.

== Achievements ==
Year	Competition	Venue	Position	Event	Performance	Notes
1938	European Championships	(Austria) Vienna	3rd	4 × 100 m relay	50.4	

== National titles ==
Rosetta Cattaneo has won the individual national championship four times.

- 4 wins in the 200 metres (1939, 1940, 1942, 1943)

== See also ==
- Italy national relay team
