= Italia Lucchini =

Italian sprinter

Personal information
- Nationality: Italian
- Born: 8 December 1918 Marino, Italy
- Died: 29 April 1998 (aged 79)

Sport
- Country: Italy
- Sport: Athletics
- Event: Sprint
Medal record
Women's athletics
Representing Italy
European Championships
Bronze medal – third place	1938 Vienna	4×100 m

Italia Lucchini (8 December 1918 – 29 April 1998) was an Italian sprinter.

== Biography ==
She won bronze medal in the 4×100 metres relay, first medal of ever for the Italian women in a relay race, at the 1938 European Athletics Championships in Vienna, with Maria Apollonio, Rosetta Cattaneo and Maria Alfero She has 7 caps in national team from 1938 to 1942.

== Achievements ==
Year	Competition	Venue	Position	Event	Performance	Notes
1938	European Championships	(Austria) Vienna	3rd	4 × 100 m relay	50.4	

== National titles ==
Italia Lucchini has won 3 times the individual national championship.

- 3 wins in the 100 metres (1939, 1941, 1942)

== See also ==
- Italy national relay team
