= Nel Büch =

Dutch sprinter

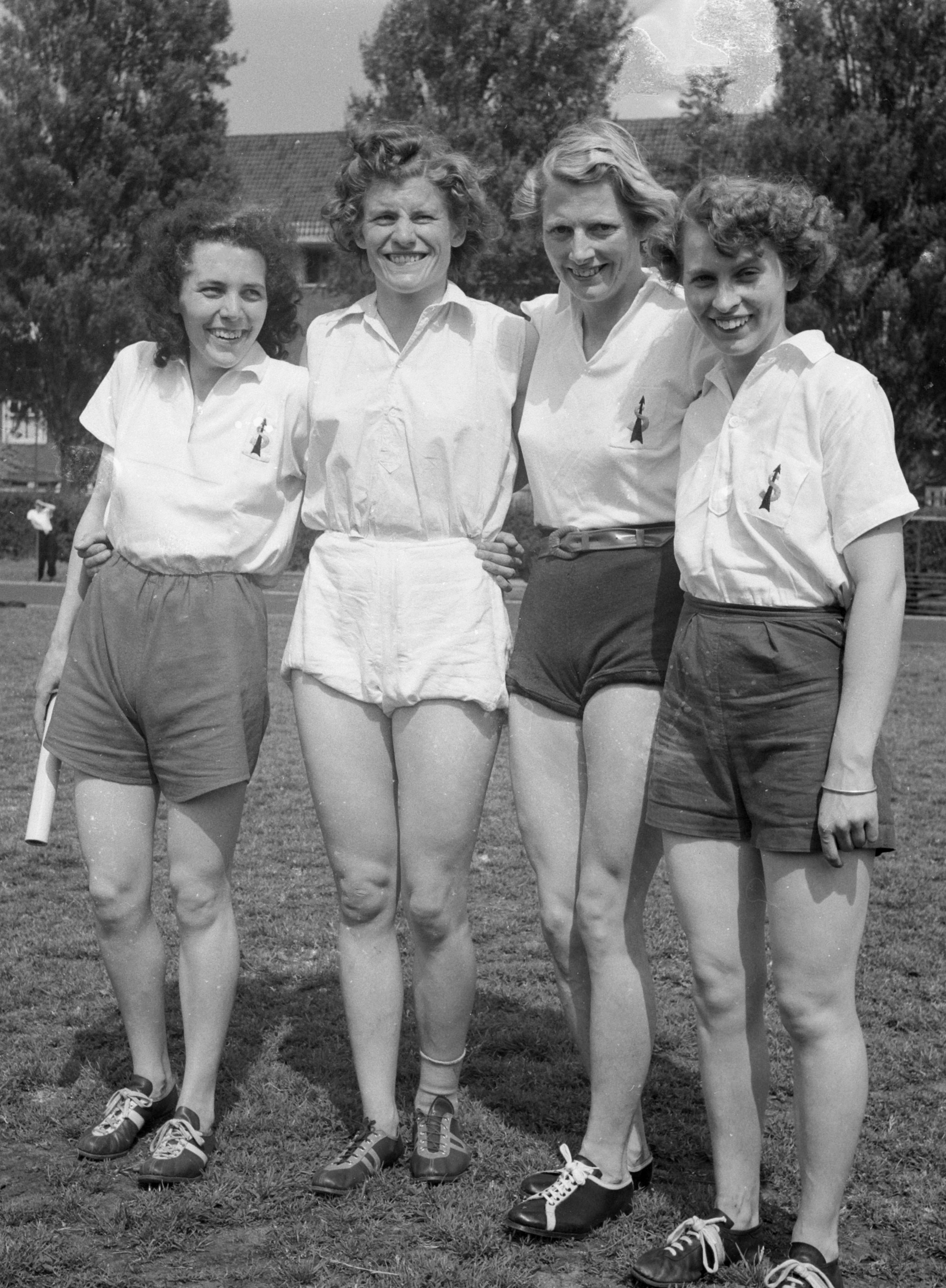
- Nel Büch, Gré de Jongh, Fanny Blankers-Koen and Ina van Vooren in 1950

Personal information
- Born: 6 December 1931 Amsterdam, the Netherlands
- Died: 5 February 2013 (aged 81) Amsterdam, the Netherlands

Sport
- Sport: Sprint
- Club: Sagitta, Amsterdam

Petronella "Nel" Büch (6 December 1931, de Vos – 5 February 2013) was a Dutch sprinter. She competed at the 1952 Summer Olympics in the 100 m and 4 × 100 m relay and finished in sixth place in the relay. Between 1950 and 1954 she won five national titles in the 4 × 100 m relay with the team of her club Sagitta.
