= Wierzchownia, Kuyavian-Pomeranian Voivodeship =

Wierzchownia
- Village
- Location within Poland
- Coordinates: 53°09′15.08″N 19°39′06.0″E
- Country: Poland
- Voivodeship: Kuyavian-Pomeranian Voivodeship
- Powiat: Brodnica
- Gmina: Górzno

Wierzchownia [vjɛʂˈxɔvɲa] is a village in the administrative district of Gmina Górzno, within Brodnica County in Kuyavian-Pomeranian Voivodeship, in northern Poland.

Polish athlete Stanisława Walasiewicz was born here.
