= Maria Apollonio =

Italian sprinter

Personal information
- Nationality: Italian
- Born: 13 June 1919 Trieste, Italy
- Died: 1990

Sport
- Country: Italy
- Sport: Athletics
- Event: Sprint
Medal record
Women's athletics
Representing Italy
European Championships
Bronze medal – third place	1938 Vienna	4×100 m

Maria Apollonio (13 June 1919 – 1990) was an Italian sprinter.

== Biography ==
She won bronze medal in the 4×100 metres relay, first medal of ever for the Italian women in a relay race, at the 1938 European Athletics Championships in Vienna, with Maria Alfero, Rosetta Cattaneo and Italia Lucchini She has 3 caps in national team from 1937 to 1938.

== Achievements ==
Year	Competition	Venue	Position	Event	Performance	Notes
1938	European Championships	(Austria) Vienna	3rd	4 × 100 m relay	50.4	

== See also ==
- Italy national relay team
