= Käthe Krauss =

German track and field athlete

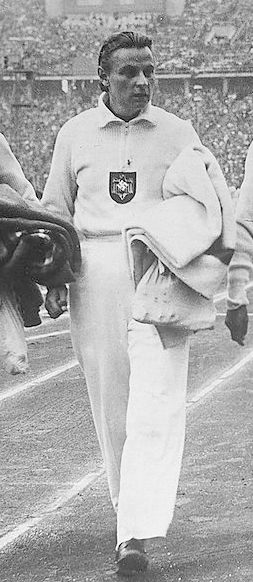
- Krauß at the 1936 Olympics

Personal information
- Born: 29 November 1906 Dresden, German Empire
- Died: 9 January 1970 (aged 63) Mannheim, West Germany
- Height: 5 ft 9 1/4 in (176 cm)
- Weight: 72 kg (159 lb)

Sport
- Sport: Athletics
- Event(s): 100 m, 200 m, 80 m hurdles, high jump, long jump, shot put, discus throw, javelin throw
- Club: Dresdner SC

Achievements and titles
- Personal best(s): 100 m – 11.8 (1935); 200 m – 24.4 (1938); 80 mH – 12.2 (1936); HJ – 1.51 m (1933); LJ – 5.85 m (1937); SP – 11.99 m (1933); DT – 41.65 m (1935); JT – 37.91 m (1931)
Medal record
Women's athletics
Representing Germany
Olympic Games
Bronze medal – third place	1936 Berlin	100 m
Women's World Games
Gold medal – first place	1934 London	100 metres
Gold medal – first place	1934 London	200 metres
Gold medal – first place	1934 London	4×100 m
Bronze medal – third place	1934 London	Discus throw
European Championships
Gold medal – first place	1938 Vienna	4×100 m
Silver medal – second place	1938 Vienna	100 m
Silver medal – second place	1938 Vienna	200 m

Katharina "Käthe" Anna Krauß (sometimes spelled Krauss; 29 November 1906 – 9 January 1970) was a German track and field athlete, who won three gold medals at the 1934 Women's World Games in London and a bronze medal in the 100 metres at the 1936 Summer Olympics in Berlin, where she was also on the German 4 × 100 m relay team. She won several German championships in various events and 2 silver medals and a gold medal in the 4 × 100 m relay at the 1938 European Athletics Championships in Vienna.

== Athletics career ==
Born in Dresden, Krauß was a member of Dresdner SC, where she was discovered and trained by the influential coach Woldemar Gerschler. She won the national women's title in the 100 metres from 1934 through 1938, in the 200 metres in 1932, 1934, and 1938 (in 1931 and 1933 she took second), and in the long jump and the pentathlon in 1937, and was on the national champion Dresdner SC 4 × 100 metre relay teams in 1932 and 1936.

At the 1934 Women's World Games in London, she won gold medals in the 100 metres (11.9 s), the 200 metres (24.9 s), and the 4 × 100 metre relay (48.6 s), and the bronze medal in discus (39.875 m).

At the women's 1938 European Athletics Championships in Vienna, she won silver medals in the 100 metres (12.0 s) and 200 metres (24.4 s) and a gold medal as part of the German 4 × 100 metre relay team (46.8 s).

At the 1936 Olympic Games in Berlin, at that time holding the German women's record for the 100 metres, Krauß won the bronze medal in that event with a time of 11.9 s. She was one of three Olympic medalists that year from Dresdner SC, the others being Rudolf Harbig and Luise Krüger. She was also on the German women's 4 × 100 m relay team that was in the lead but lost due to a dropped baton on the final leg; in the heats the German team had been faster than the Americans, the eventual winners, and beaten the world record with a time of 46.4 s; the American winning time in the final was half a second slower. As national 100-metre champion, Krauß was the fastest runner on the German team, but had run dead heats with Marie Dollinger.

== Postwar ==
After World War II, Krauß moved to Landau, where she coached and was active in senior athletics; there she was also known as a pianist and the owner of a sporting goods shop. In 1952 she published a book on sprint running titled Der Kurzstreckenlauf. The local athletics club awards a prize named for her. She died in Mannheim on 9 January 1970.

== Controversy ==
Along with the gold and silver medalists in the 1936 Olympic women's 100 metre event, Helen Stephens and Stanisława Walasiewicz, Krauß has been suspected of being intersex.
