= Sagitta (athletic club) =

Female athletic club in the Netherlands

AV Sagitta
- Type: Female
- Founded: 1936
- Ground: Sportpark Olympiaplein
- Location: Amsterdam
- Colors: Orange-Blue

Sagitta was a female athletic club in the Netherlands founded by Jan Blankers in 1936. Integrated with Blauw-Wit into Phanos on 1 January 2000.

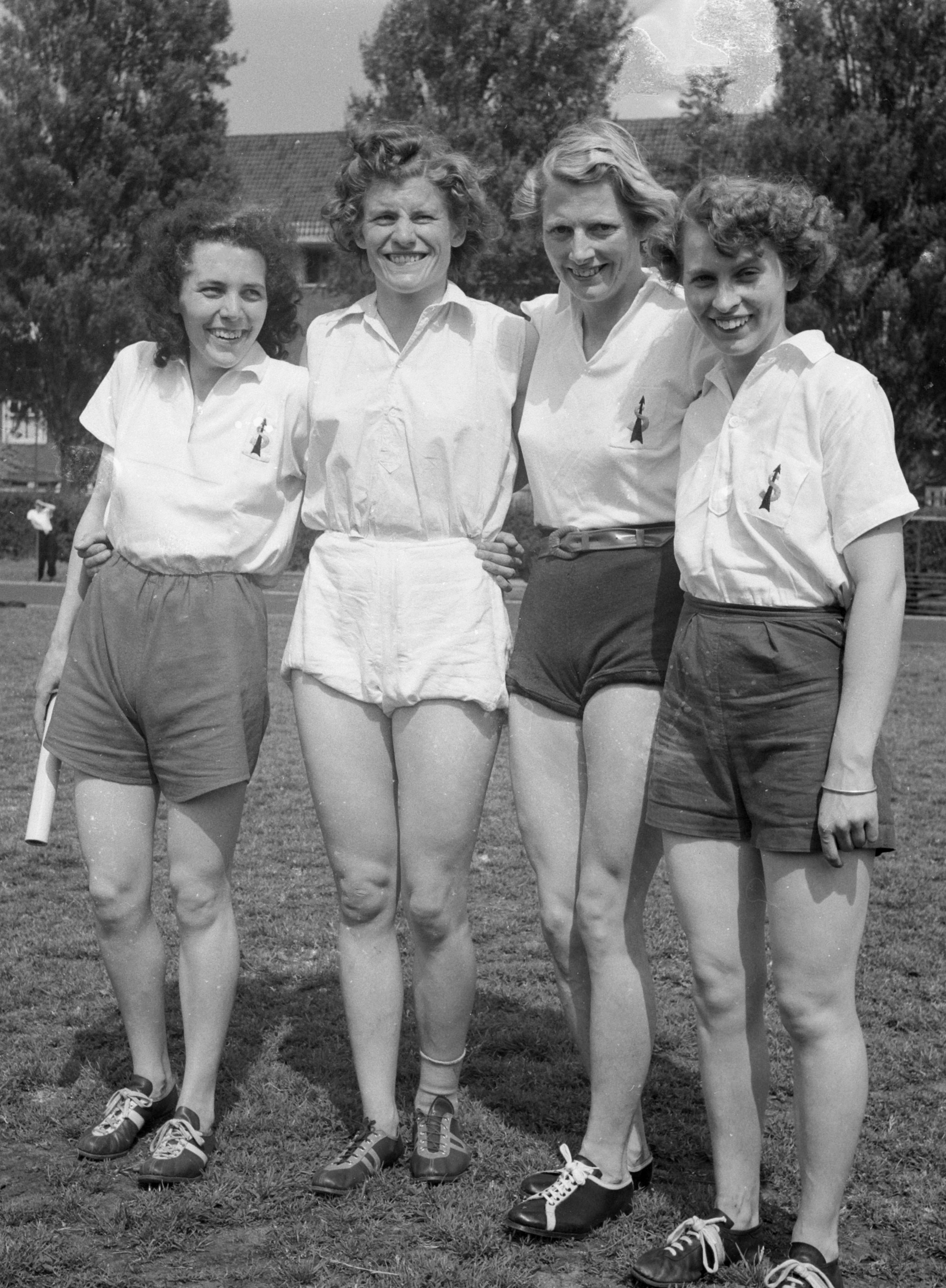
The 1950 national champion 4 × 100 m relay included Nel Büch, Ina van Vooren, Gré de Jongh and Fanny Blankers-Koen

Between 1950 and 1954 the 4 × 100 m relay won five national titles. Sagitta athletes participated in Dutch 4 × 100 m relay in several olympic games.

== Athletes ==
- Corrie Bakker
- Fanny Blankers-Koen
- Loes Boling
- Annemieke Bouma
- Stans Brehm
- Nel Büch
- Ciska Jansen
- Gré de Jongh
- Ans Niesink
- Nel Roos-Lodder
- Hilda Slaman
- Lies Sluijters
- Tilly van der Zwaard
- Els van Noorduyn
