= 1938 European Athletics Championships – Women's high jump =

Women's high jump at the European Athletics Championships

The women's high jump at the 1938 European Athletics Championships was held in Vienna, at the time part of German Reich, at Praterstadion on 18 September 1938.

== Medalists ==
Gold	Ibolya Csák; Hungary
Silver	Nelly van Balen Blanken; Netherlands
Bronze	Feodora zu Solms; Germany

== Results ==
=== Final ===
18 September

Rank	Name	Nationality	Result	Notes
1st place, gold medalist(s)	Ibolya Csák	Hungary	1.64	CR, NR
2nd place, silver medalist(s)	Nelly van Balen Blanken	Netherlands	1.64	NR
3rd place, bronze medalist(s)	Feodora zu Solms	Germany	1.64	
4	Dorothy Cosnett	Great Britain	1.58	
5	Dora Gardner	Great Britain	1.58	
6	Ilsebill Pfenning	Switzerland	1.55	
7	Karin Färnström	Sweden	1.55	
8	Wanda Nowak	Germany	1.50	
	Dora Ratjen	Germany	DQ	

== Participation ==
According to an unofficial count, 9 athletes from 6 countries participated in the event.

- Germany (3)
- Hungary (1)
- Netherlands (1)
- Sweden (1)
- Switzerland (1)
- Great Britain (2)
