= Ibolya Csák =

Hungarian athlete (1915–2006)

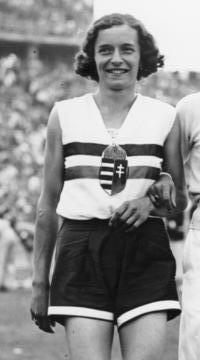
- Ibolya Csák at the 1936 Olympics.

Personal information
- Born: 6 January 1915 Budapest, Kingdom of Hungary
- Died: 9 February 2006 (aged 91) Budapest, Hungary
Medal record
Women's athletics
Representing Hungary
Olympic Games
Gold medal – first place	1936 Berlin	High jump
European Championships
Gold medal – first place	1938 Vienna	High jump

Ibolya Csák (6 January 1915 – 9 February 2006) was a Hungarian athlete.

== Career ==
Csák was best known as the winner of the women's high jump at the 1936 Berlin Olympics. She won a gold medal in the European Championships in Athletics in 1938 in unusual circumstances. She was the first Hungarian woman to win a gold medal in both events.

Her win in the 1936 Olympics was one of the tightest in the history of high jumping. Three athletes cleared 160 cm but none cleared 162. The three competitors were offered a fourth opportunity and Csák was the only one to clear the height.

She was a Hungarian Jew; she was one of a number of Jewish athletes who won medals at the Olympics in Berlin in 1936.

Csák won the gold medal in the 1938 European championships after the original winner, Germany's Dora Ratjen, turned out to be a man. The height Csák cleared in that event was the Hungarian record for the high jump for the next 24 years.

She won nine Hungarian titles in all, including two in the long jump.

She was a competitor of the National Gymnastics Club (NTE) from 1929 until 1939, a gymnast from 1929 until 1932, and an athlete from 1933 until 1939. She also received the International Fair Play Life Achievement Award in 2005.

== Personal life ==
Between 1936 and 1970, she worked in the central office of the Hungarian Banknote Printing Co.

She had two children, Ibolya (1940) and Attila (1942).

== See also ==
- 1936 Summer Olympics
- Athletics at the 1936 Summer Olympics – Women's high jump
