= Nel Roos-Lodder =

Dutch discus thrower

Personal information
- Born: 4 April 1914 Amsterdam, the Netherlands
- Died: 4 June 1996 (aged 82) Amsterdam, the Netherlands

Sport
- Sport: Discus throw
- Club: Sagitta, Amsterdam

Petronella Gerardina "Nel" Roos-Lodder (4 April 1914 – 4 June 1996) was a Dutch discus thrower. She competed at 1948 Summer Olympics and finished in 13th place.
