= Elspeth Hay =

British sprinter

Elspeth Graham
Personal information
- Nationality: British
- Born: 24 April 1930 (age 96)

Sport
- Country: Great Britain
- Event: 100 metres
Medal record
Event	1st	2nd	3rd
European Athletics Championships	1	0	0
Total	1	0	0
Women's athletics
Representing Great Britain
European Athletics Championships
Gold medal – first place	1950 Brussels	4 × 100 m relay

Elspeth Hay, also known by her married name Elspeth Graham, (born 24 April 1930) is a British former sprinter who won a gold medal in the 4 × 100 metres relay at the 1950 European Athletics Championships.

== Career ==
Hay was scheduled to compete at the 1948 Summer Olympics in London, but was injured in training prior to the event. In 1950, she competed in the European Athletics Championships; in doing so, she became the first Scottish person to compete at the European Athletics Championships. She came fifth in the individual 100 metres event, and was a member of the gold medal-winning Great Britain 4 × 100 metres relay team. In the same year, she won the women's 100-yard dash event at the Edinburgh Highland games.

== Post-retirement ==
After her retirement, Hay volunteered almost 40 years for the Women's Royal Voluntary Service. She also worked as a tour guide for a stately home. Graham ran in Balbeggie as part of the torch relay prior to the 2012 Summer Olympics in London. At the time, she was living in Perth.
