= Irmgard Praetz =

German long jumper

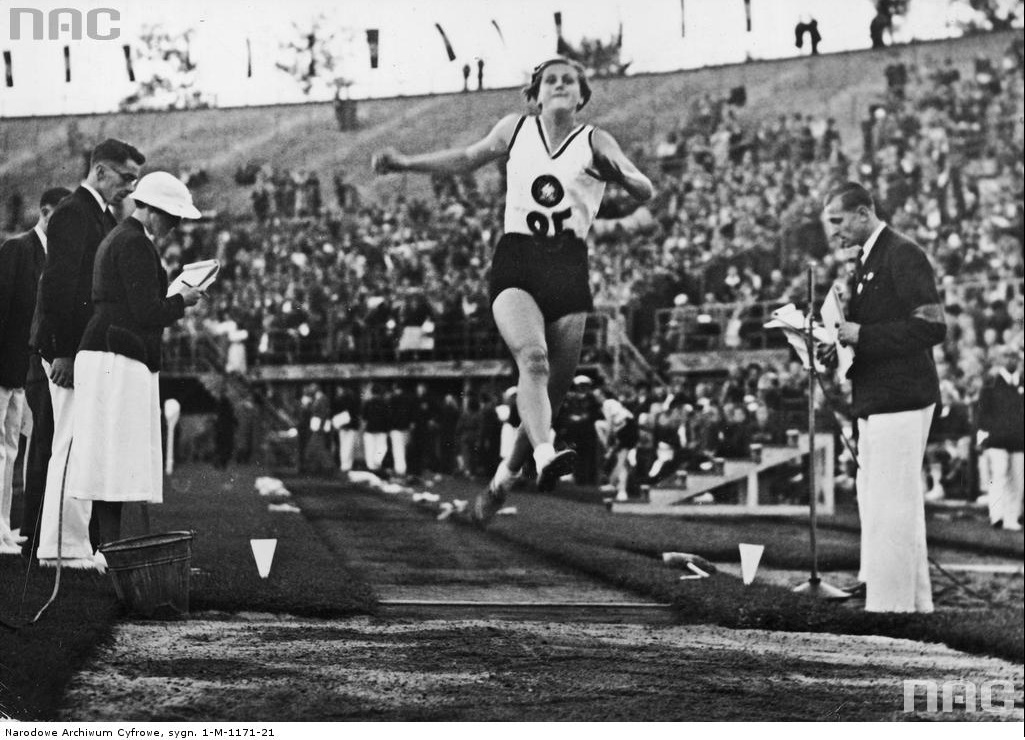
- Irmgard Praetz EM 1938

Medal record

Women's athletics

Representing Germany

European Championships
Gold medal – first place	1938 Vienna	Long jump

Irmgard Praetz (9 August 1920 – 7 November 2008) was a German track and field athlete who competed mainly in the long jump. She was the gold medallist in that event at the 1938 European Athletics Championships. She achieved her career best mark of 5.88 m (19 ft 3 1/4 in) at the competition, which ranked her third globally for the year.

Praetz was born in Salzwedel and died in Garching bei München. She was the 1938 long jump champion at the German Athletics Championships and was runner-up in the discipline in 1940. After World War II she won a national title in the women's pentathlon. She later married and took the name Römer.

== See also ==
- List of European Athletics Championships medalists (women)
