= Feodora Schenk =

Austrian athlete

Personal information
- Nationality: Austrian
- Born: 5 April 1920 Baruth/Mark, Germany
- Died: 23 March 2006 (aged 85) Vienna, Austria

Sport
- Sport: Athletics
- Event: High jump
Medal record
Women's athletics
Representing Germany
European Championships
| Bronze medal – third place | 1938 Vienna | High jump |

Feodora Schenk (5 April 1920 – 23 March 2006; née Feodora Gräfin von Solms-Baruth) was an Austrian athlete. She competed in the women's high jump at the 1952 Summer Olympics.
