= Fanny Blankers-Koen =

Dutch athlete (1918–2004)

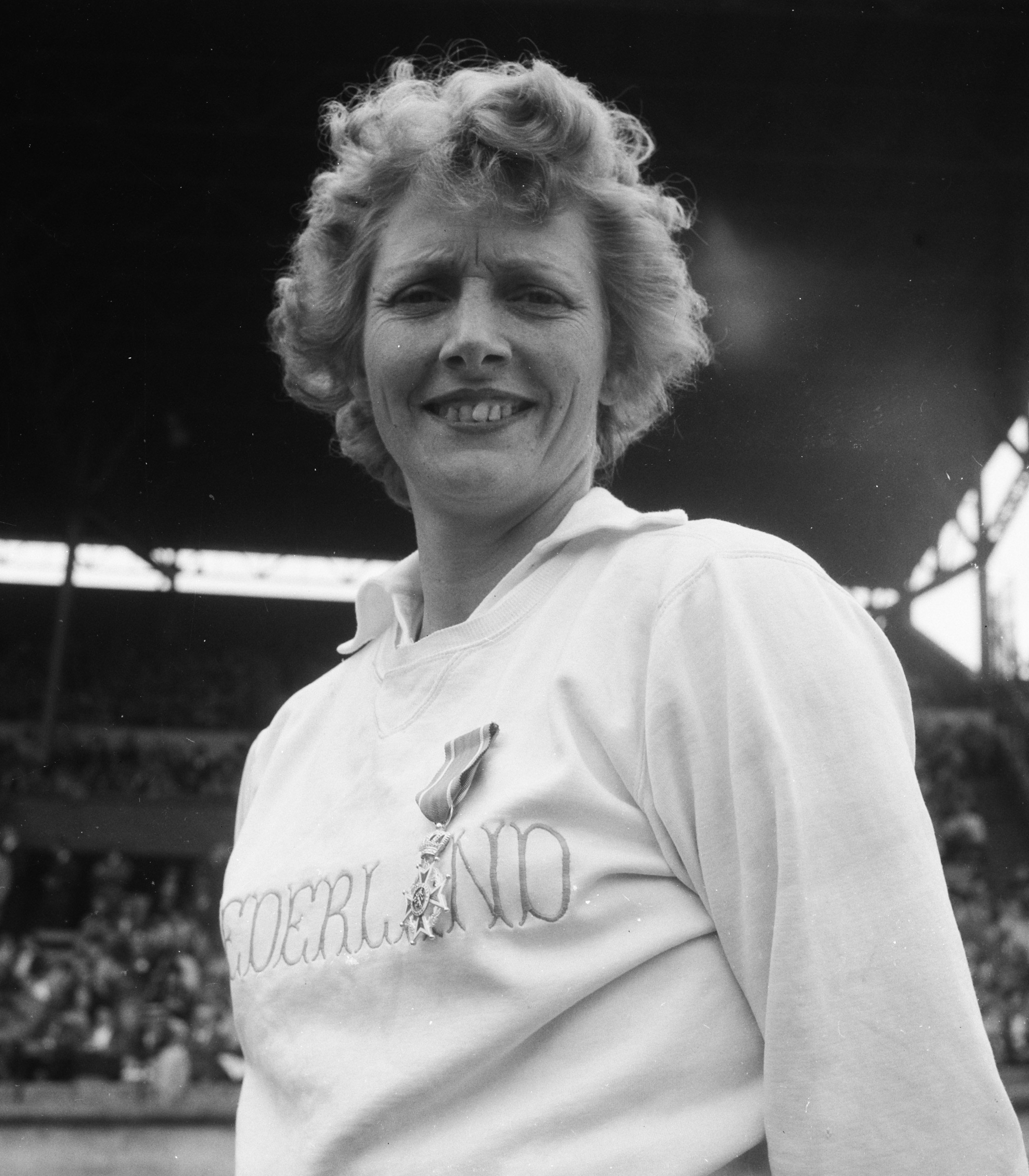
- Fanny Blankers-Koen in 1949

Personal information
- Born: Francine Elsje Koen; 26 April 1918 Lage Vuursche, Netherlands
- Died: 25 January 2004 (aged 85) Hoofddorp, Netherlands
- Height: 1.75 m (5 ft 9 in)
- Weight: 63 kg (139 lb)
- Spouse: Jan Blankers (m. 1940; died 1977)

Sport
- Sport: Track and field
- Events: 100 m, 200 m, 80 m hurdles, 4 × 100 m relay
- Club: Sagitta, Amsterdam; ADA, Amsterdam
Medal record
Women's athletics
Representing Netherlands
Olympic Games
Gold medal – first place	1948 London	100 m
Gold medal – first place	1948 London	200 m
Gold medal – first place	1948 London	80 m hurdles
Gold medal – first place	1948 London	4×100 m
European Championships
Gold medal – first place	1946 Oslo	80 m hurdles
Gold medal – first place	1946 Oslo	4×100 m
Gold medal – first place	1950 Brussels	100 m
Gold medal – first place	1950 Brussels	200 m
Gold medal – first place	1950 Brussels	80 m hurdles
Silver medal – second place	1950 Brussels	4×100 m
Bronze medal – third place	1938 Vienna	100 m
Bronze medal – third place	1938 Vienna	200 m

Francina Elsje "Fanny" Blankers-Koen (pronounced [frɑnˈsinaː ˈʔɛlɕə ˈfɑni ˈblɑŋkərs ˈkun]; née Koen, 26 April 1918 – 25 January 2004) was a Dutch track and field athlete, best known for winning four gold medals at the 1948 Summer Olympics in London. She competed there as a 30-year-old mother of two, earning her the nickname "the Flying Housewife", and was the most successful athlete at the event.

Having started competing in athletics in 1935, she took part in the 1936 Summer Olympics a year later. Although international competition was stopped by World War II, Blankers-Koen set several world records during that period, in events as diverse as the long jump, the high jump, and sprint and hurdling events.

Apart from her four Olympic titles, she won five European titles and 58 Dutch championships, and set or tied 12 world records – the last, in the pentathlon, in 1951 aged 33. She retired from athletics in 1955, after which she became captain of the Dutch female track and field team. In 1999, she was voted "Female Athlete of the Century" by the International Association of Athletics Federations (IAAF). Her Olympic victories are credited with helping to eliminate the belief that age and motherhood were barriers to success in women's sport.

== Early life ==
Fanny Koen was born on 26 April 1918 in Lage Vuursche (near Baarn) to Arnoldus and Helena Koen. Her father was a government official who competed in the shot put and discus. She had five brothers. As a teenager, she enjoyed tennis, swimming, gymnastics, ice skating, fencing and running. Standing 1.75 m (5 ft 9 in), she was a natural athlete. It soon became clear she had a talent for sports, but she could not decide which sport to pick. A swimming coach advised her to concentrate on running because there were already several top swimmers in the Netherlands at that time (such as Rie Mastenbroek), and she would have a better chance to qualify for the Olympics in a track event.

Her first appearance in the sport was in 1935, aged 17. Her first competition was a disappointment, but in her third race, she set a national record in the 800 m. Fanny Koen soon made the Dutch team, although as a sprinter, not a middle-distance runner. At that time, 800 m was generally considered too physically demanding for female contestants and had been removed from the Olympic programme after 1928. The following year, her coach and future husband, Jan Blankers, a former Olympic triple-jumper who had participated in the 1928 Olympics, encouraged her to enter the trials for the 1936 Olympics in Berlin. At eighteen years old, she was selected to compete in the high jump and the 4 × 100 m relay.

At the Berlin Olympics, the high jump and the 4 × 100 m relay competitions were held on the same day. In the high jump, she took fifth place (shared with two other jumpers), while the Dutch relay team came in fifth in the final (the sixth team in the final, Germany, was disqualified). She also obtained the autograph of American athlete Jesse Owens; it became her most treasured possession.

Slowly, Koen rose to the top. In 1938, she ran her first world record (11.0 seconds in the 100 yards), and she also won her first international medals. At the European Championships in Vienna, she won the bronze in both the 100 and 200 m, which were both won by Stanisława Walasiewicz. Many observers, and Koen herself, expected her to do well at the upcoming Olympics, which were due to be held in Helsinki in July 1940.

However, the outbreak of World War II put a stop to the preparations. The Olympics were formally cancelled on 2 May 1940, a week before the Netherlands was invaded.

== World War II ==
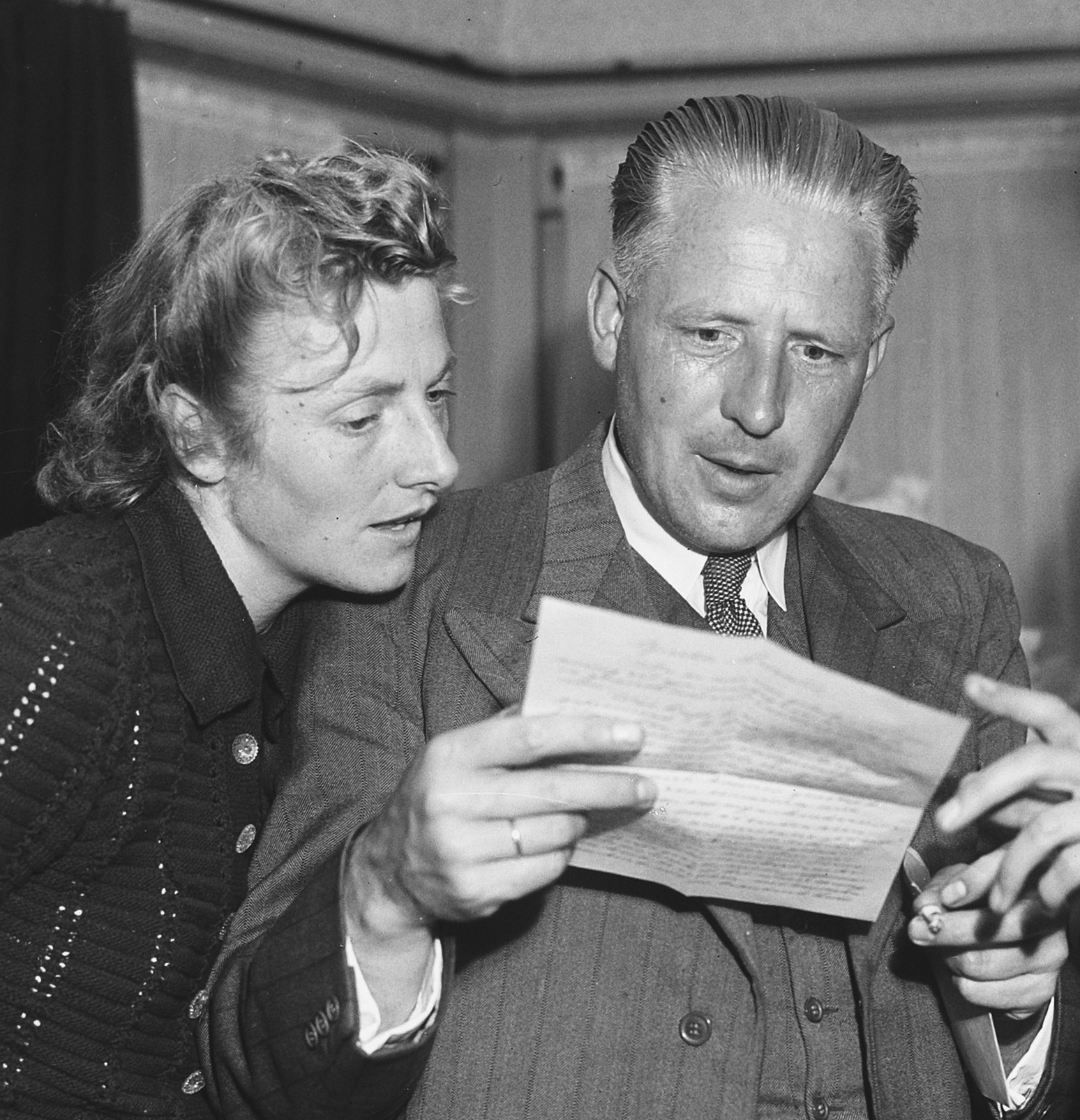
Fanny with her husband Jan Blankers after the war in 1948.

Just prior to the invasion, Koen had become engaged, and on 29 August 1940, she married Jan Blankers (who was fifteen years her senior), thereupon changing her name to Blankers-Koen. Blankers was then a sports journalist and the coach of the Dutch women's athletics team, even though he originally thought women should not compete in sports – not an unusual opinion at the time. However, his attitude toward female athletes changed after he fell in love with Koen.

When Blankers-Koen gave birth to her first child, Jan Junior, in 1942, Dutch media automatically assumed her career would be over. Top female athletes who were married were rare at the time, and it was considered inconceivable that a mother would be an athlete. Blankers-Koen resumed training only weeks after their son's birth.

During the war, domestic competition in sports continued in the German-occupied Netherlands, and Blankers-Koen set six new world records between 1942 and 1944. The first came in 1942, when she improved the world mark in the 80 m hurdles. The following year, she did even better. First, she improved the high jump record by an unequalled 5 cm from 1.66 m to 1.71 m in a specially arranged competition in Amsterdam on 30 May. Then, she tied the 100 m world record, but this was never recognised officially, as she competed against men when setting the record. She closed out the season with a new world record in the long jump, 6.25 m on 19 September 1943. The latter record would stand until 1954.

Circumstances were not easy, and it became harder to get enough food, especially for an athlete in training. Despite this, Blankers-Koen managed to break the 100 yd (91 m) world record in May 1944. At the same meet, she ran with the relay team that broke the 4 × 110 yd (100 m) world record. The German press was excited, as the previous record had been set by an English team. Months later, she helped break the 4 × 200 m record, which was held by Germany. In an act of defiance, the women wore outfits with national symbols while setting the record.

The winter of 1944–45, known as the Hongerwinter (hunger winter), was severe, and there was a serious lack of food, especially in the big cities. She gave birth to a daughter, Fanneke, in 1945 and in contrast to her previous post-birth activities, took seven months off from sport and only undertook limited training.

== "The flying housewife" ==
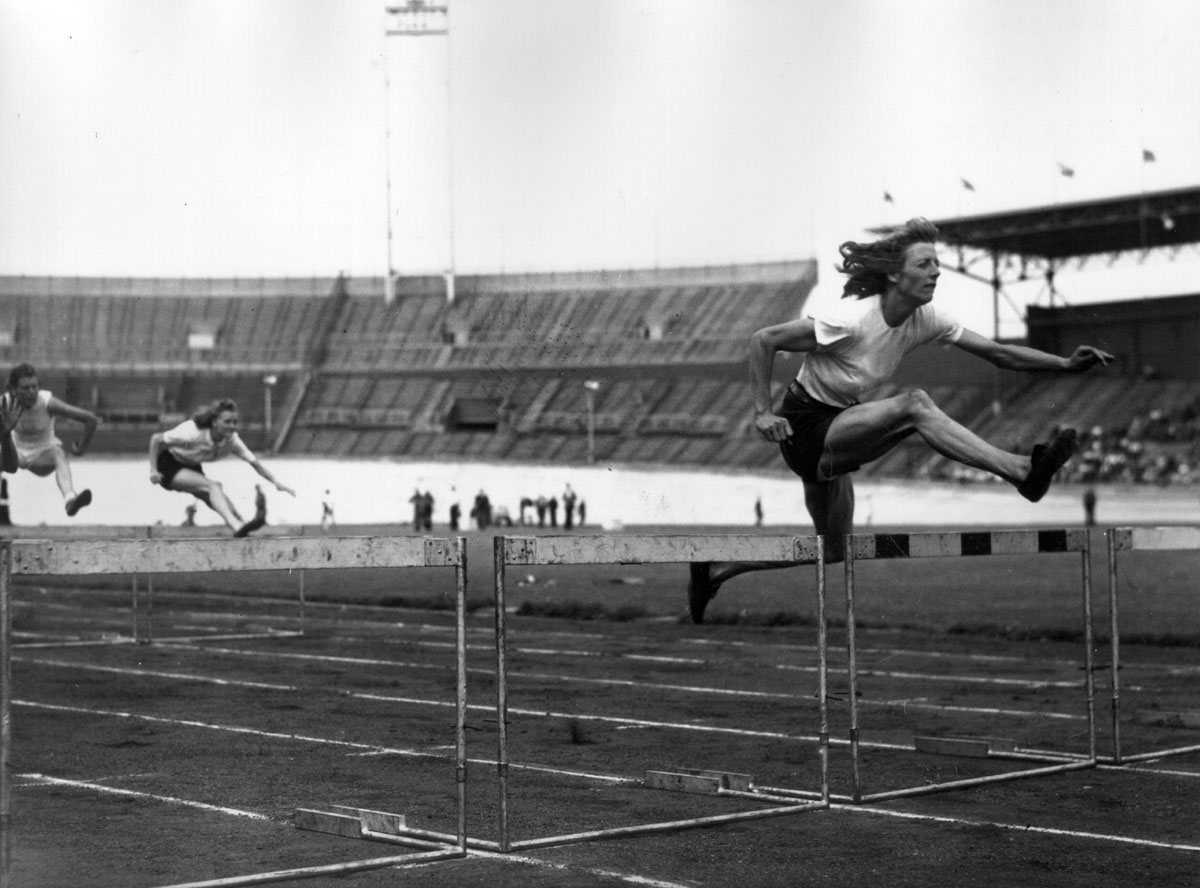
Blankers-Koen won the 80 m hurdles at the 1947 Dutch Championships in Amsterdam.

The first major international event after the war was the 1946 European Championships, held in Oslo, Norway. The championships were a slight disappointment. In the 100 m semi-finals, held during the high jump final, she fell and failed to qualify for the final. Competing with bruises from the fall, she ended the high jump competition in fourth. The second day was more successful, as she won the 80 m hurdles event, and led the Dutch relay team to victory in the 4 × 100 m.

As the leading female athlete in the Netherlands – in 1947 she won national titles in six women's events – Blankers-Koen was assured of a place on the Dutch team for the first post-war Olympics, held in London. After her experience in Oslo, she decided not to take part in all events, but limit herself to four: she dropped the high jump and long jump to concentrate on the 100 m, the 200 m, the 80 m hurdles, and the 4 × 100 m relay (competition rules also prevented an athlete from competing in more than three individual track and field events).

Although she displayed her form two months before the Games by beating her own 80 m hurdles world record – one of the six world records that she held at that time – some journalists questioned her, suggesting 30 years was too old for a woman to be an athlete. The British athletics team's manager, Jack Crump, opined that she was "too old to make the grade". Many in the Netherlands were concerned for the welfare of the family, saying that she should stay at home to look after her children, not compete in athletics events.

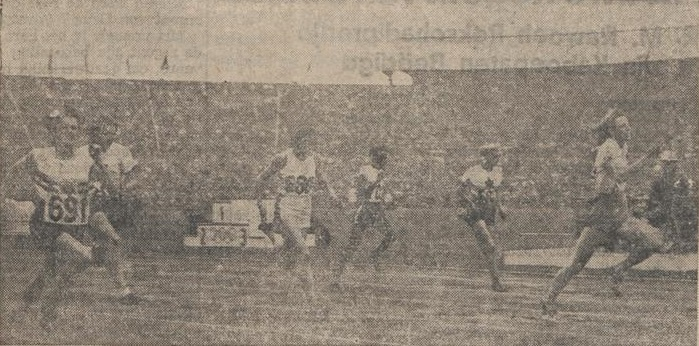
Blankers winning the 100 m final at the 1948 Summer Olympics

Her first competition was the 100 m, and she qualified easily for the semi-finals, in which she set the fastest time. The final (2 August) was held on a muddy track and in rainy conditions. Blankers-Koen sped to the finish line in 11.9, easily beating her opponents Dorothy Manley and Shirley Strickland, who took second and third.

Fanny Blankers-Koen thereby became the first Dutch athlete to win an Olympic title in athletics, but she was more concerned with her next event, the 80 m hurdles. Her chief opponent was Maureen Gardner, also coached by Blankers-Koen's husband and who had equalled Blankers-Koen's world record prior to the Games, and would be running for her home crowd. Both athletes made the final, in which Blankers-Koen got off to a bad start (she would later claim she thought there had been a false start).

She picked up the pace quickly, but was unable to shake off Gardner, who kept close until the finish line, and the two finished almost simultaneously. When the British national anthem was played, the crowd in Wembley Stadium cheered, and Blankers-Koen briefly thought she had been beaten. However, the anthem was played in honour of the British royal family, which entered the stadium at that time. Examination of the finish photo clearly showed that not Gardner, but Blankers-Koen had won, although both received the same time (11.2 seconds).

In spite of her successes, Blankers-Koen nearly failed to start in the semi-finals of the 200 m, held the day after the hurdles final. Shortly before the semi-final, she broke down because of homesickness. After a long talk with her husband, she decided to run anyway, and qualified for the final with great ease. The final, on 6 August, was again held in the pouring rain, but Blankers-Koen completed the inaugural Olympic 200 m for women in 24.4, seven-tenths of a second ahead of runner-up Audrey Williamson – still the largest margin of victory in an Olympic 200 m final. Audrey Patterson placed in third, thereby becoming the first African American woman to win an Olympic medal.

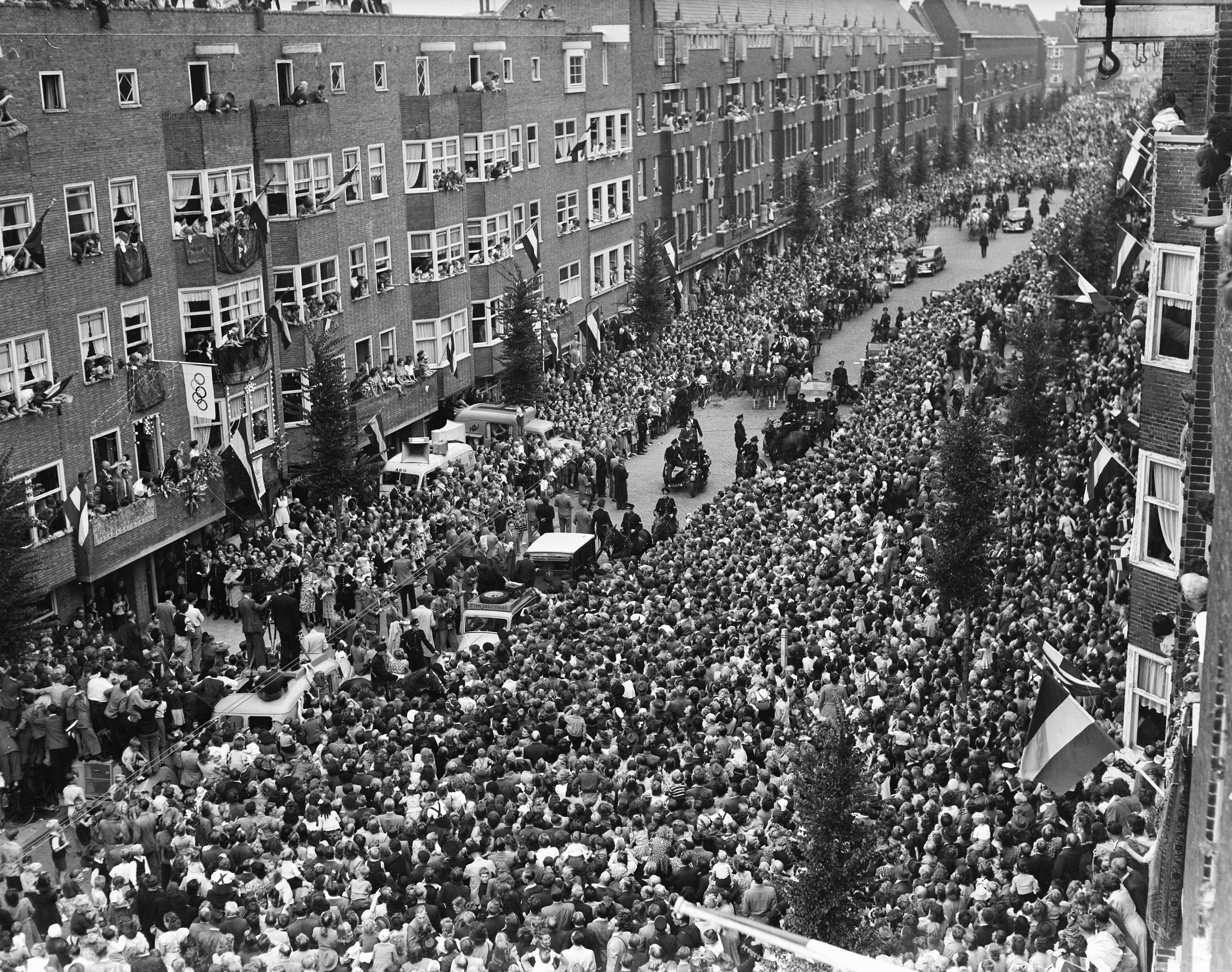
Blankers-Koen's arrival in Amsterdam after the 1948 London Olympics.

The 4 × 100 m final was held on the final day of the track and field competitions. The Dutch team, consisting of Xenia Stad-de Jong, Netti Witziers-Timmer, Gerda van der Kade-Koudijs and Blankers-Koen, qualified for the final, but just before the final, Blankers-Koen was missing. She had gone out to shop for a raincoat, and arrived just in time for the race. As the last runner, she took over the baton in third place, some five meters behind the Australian and Canadian runners. In spite of a careful and slow exchange, she caught up with the leaders, crossing the line a tenth of a second before the Australian woman. In hindsight, the Dutch team should have been disqualified because the third runner crossed the line on the inside.

Fanny Blankers-Koen won four of the nine women's events at the 1948 Olympics, competing in eleven heats and finals in eight days. She was the first woman to win four Olympic gold medals, and achieved the feat in a single Olympics. Dubbed "the flying housewife", "the flying Dutchmam", and "amazing Fanny" by the international press, she was welcomed back home in Amsterdam by an immense crowd. After a ride through the city, pulled by four white horses, she received a lot of praise and gifts. From the city of Amsterdam, she received a new bicycle: "to go through life at a slower pace" and "so she need not run so much". Queen Juliana made her a knight of the Order of Orange Nassau.

== After London ==
Now known all over the world, Blankers-Koen received many offers for endorsements, advertisements, publicity stunts, and the like. Because of the strict amateurism rules in force at the time, she had to turn most offers down. However, a fortnight after the 1948 Olympics, she entertained 35,000 spectators by equalling her 100 m world record of 10.8 seconds on Lansdowne Road's "heavy grass track".

Also, in 1949, she travelled abroad to promote women's athletics, flying to Australia and the United States.

Blankers-Koen had been chosen the 1948 Helms Athletic Foundation World Trophy Winner for Europe, and in 1949 she travelled to Los Angeles to compete in the Los Angeles Coliseum Relays.

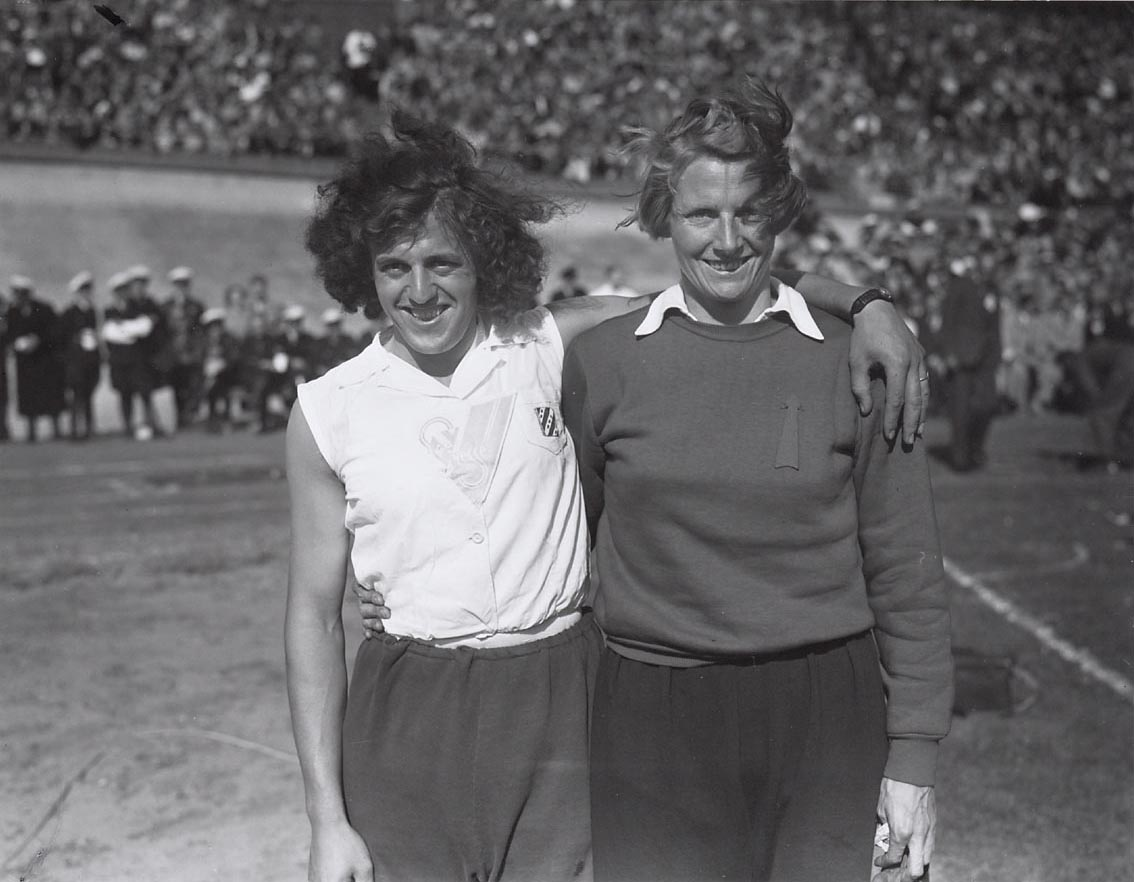
Blankers-Koen (right) with Foekje Dillema in 1950.

In 1950, a controversial episode involving one of Blankers-Koen's competitors occurred. A year earlier, a new Dutch sprint talent, Foekje Dillema had made her breakthrough. In 1950, she broke the national record in the 200 m, and some journalists already dubbed her as the "new Fanny". That year, Dillema was the first subject of the International Association of Athletics Federations's mandatory sex verification policy and was subjected to a "sex test", the details of which were never revealed. As a result, she was expelled by the Royal Dutch Athletics Federation from athletics for the rest of her life and the 200 m record she took from Blankers-Koen was erased. Dillema, who never spoke publicly on the subject, died in December 2007.

After the death of Dillema, a forensic test on body cells obtained from her clothing found that there was a Y-chromosome in Dillema's DNA, which indicated she was possibly a genetic mosaic or a true hermaphrodite. Most of the other women on the team at the time suspect it was an attempt by Blankers and Blankers-Koen to eliminate an opponent, although this has never been confirmed.

The same year, Blankers-Koen almost repeated her Olympic performance at the European Championships in Brussels. She won the titles in the 100 m, 200 m and 80 m hurdles, all with large margins of victory (four-tenths of a second or more), but narrowly missed out on a fourth win in the relay, which was won by the British team.

At age 34, she took part in her third Olympics, which were held in Helsinki. Although she was in good physical condition, she was severely hampered by a skin boil. She qualified for the 100 m semi-finals, but forfeited a start to save herself for the hurdles race. She reached the final in that event, but after knocking over the second hurdle, she abandoned the race. It was her last major competition. On 7 August 1955, Fanny Blankers-Koen was victorious for the last time, winning the national title in the shot put, her 58th Dutch title.

== Later life ==
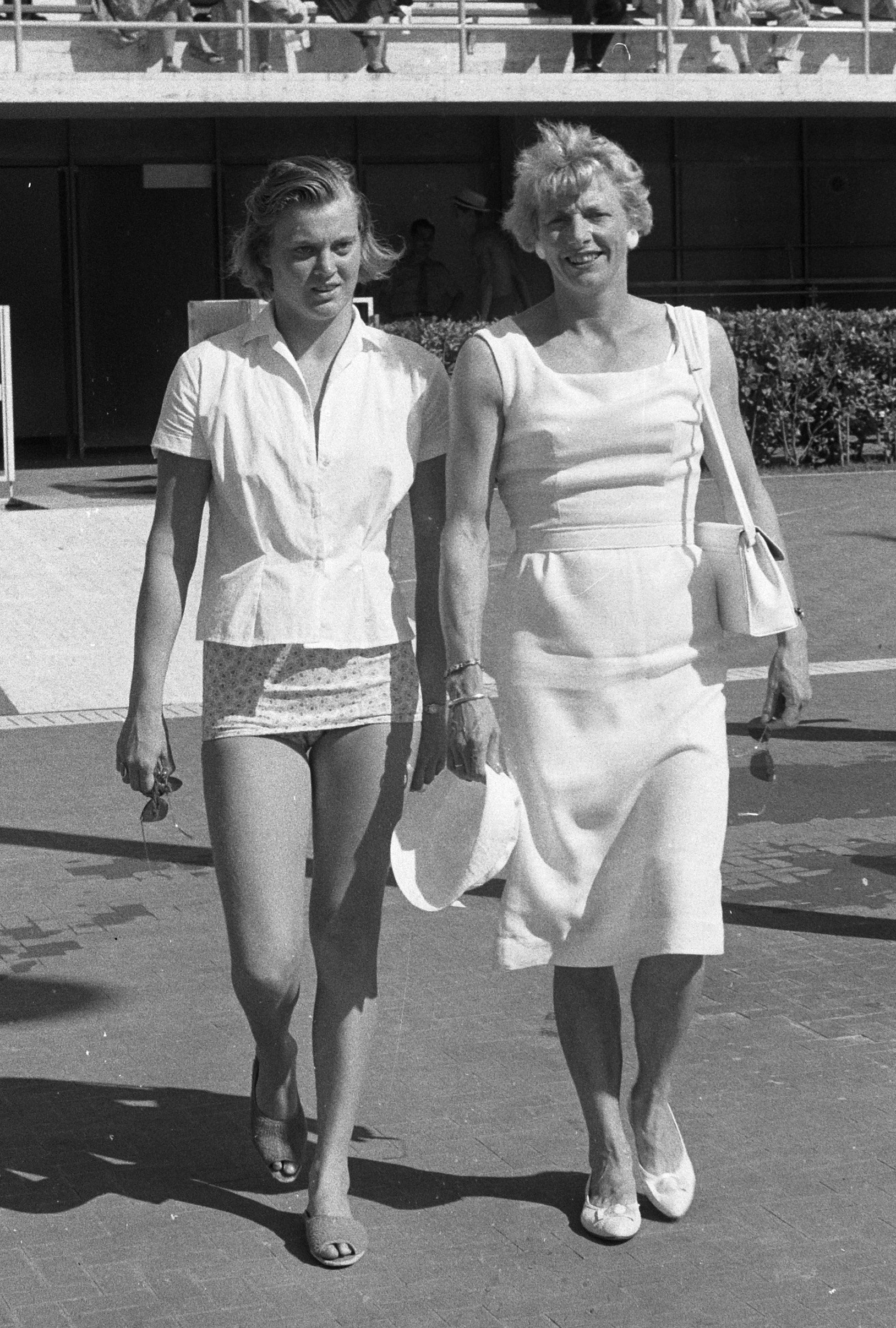
Blankers-Koen (right) with Jopie Troost at the 1960 Olympics.

After her athletic career, Blankers-Koen served as the team leader of the Dutch athletics team, from the 1958 European Championships to the 1968 Summer Olympics.

In 1977, Blankers-Koen's husband Jan died. Some years after his death, she moved back to her old hometown of Hoofddorp. In 1981, the Fanny Blankers-Koen Games, an international athletics event, were established. They are still held annually in Hengelo. Blankers-Koen's last moment of glory came in 1999. At a gala in Monaco, organized by the International Association of Athletics Federations (IAAF), she was declared the "Female Athlete of the Century". She was very surprised to have won, audibly asking "You mean it is me who has won?"

In the years prior to her death, Blankers-Koen suffered from Alzheimer's disease and lived in a psychiatric nursing home. She was also deaf. She died at age 85 in Hoofddorp on 25 January 2004.

A year before her death, the first biography of Blankers-Koen was published, Een koningin met mannenbenen (A Queen with Men's Legs) by journalist Kees Kooman. Through many interviews with relatives, friends and contemporary athletes, it paints a previously unknown picture of her. During her successful years, Dutch and international media portrayed her as the perfect mother (hence her nickname "the flying housewife"), who was modest about her own achievements. Kooman's book portrays Blankers-Koen in a different light, as a woman who found it difficult to show affection and who was driven by a desire to win. Blankers-Koen had previously written an autobiography in 1949 with help from her husband.

Her personal record on the 100 m of 11.5 remained the Amsterdam club record of Phanos for 62 years. It was finally broken in May 2010 by Jamile Samuel.

== Awards and tributes ==
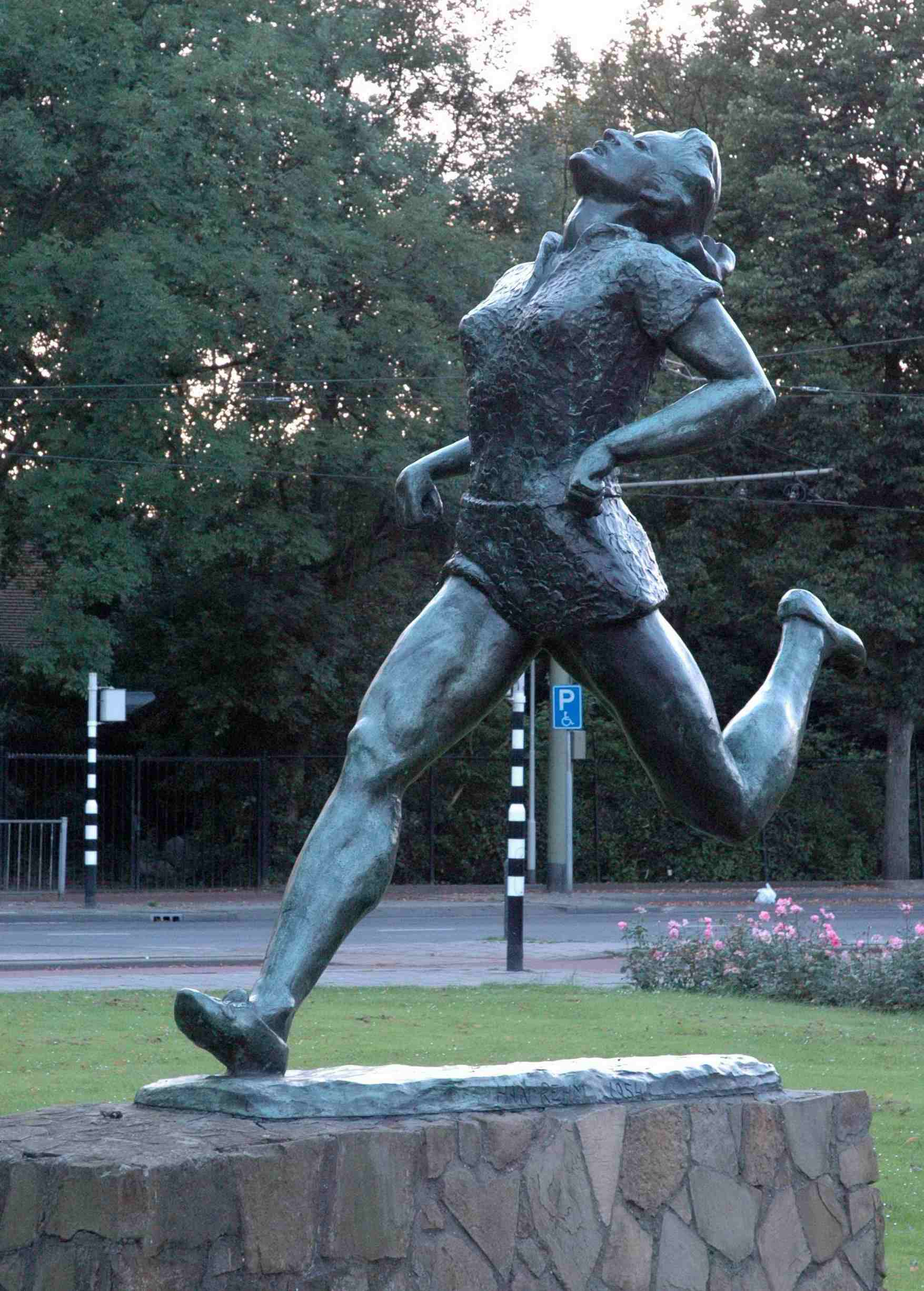
1954 statue of Blankers-Koen in Rotterdam.

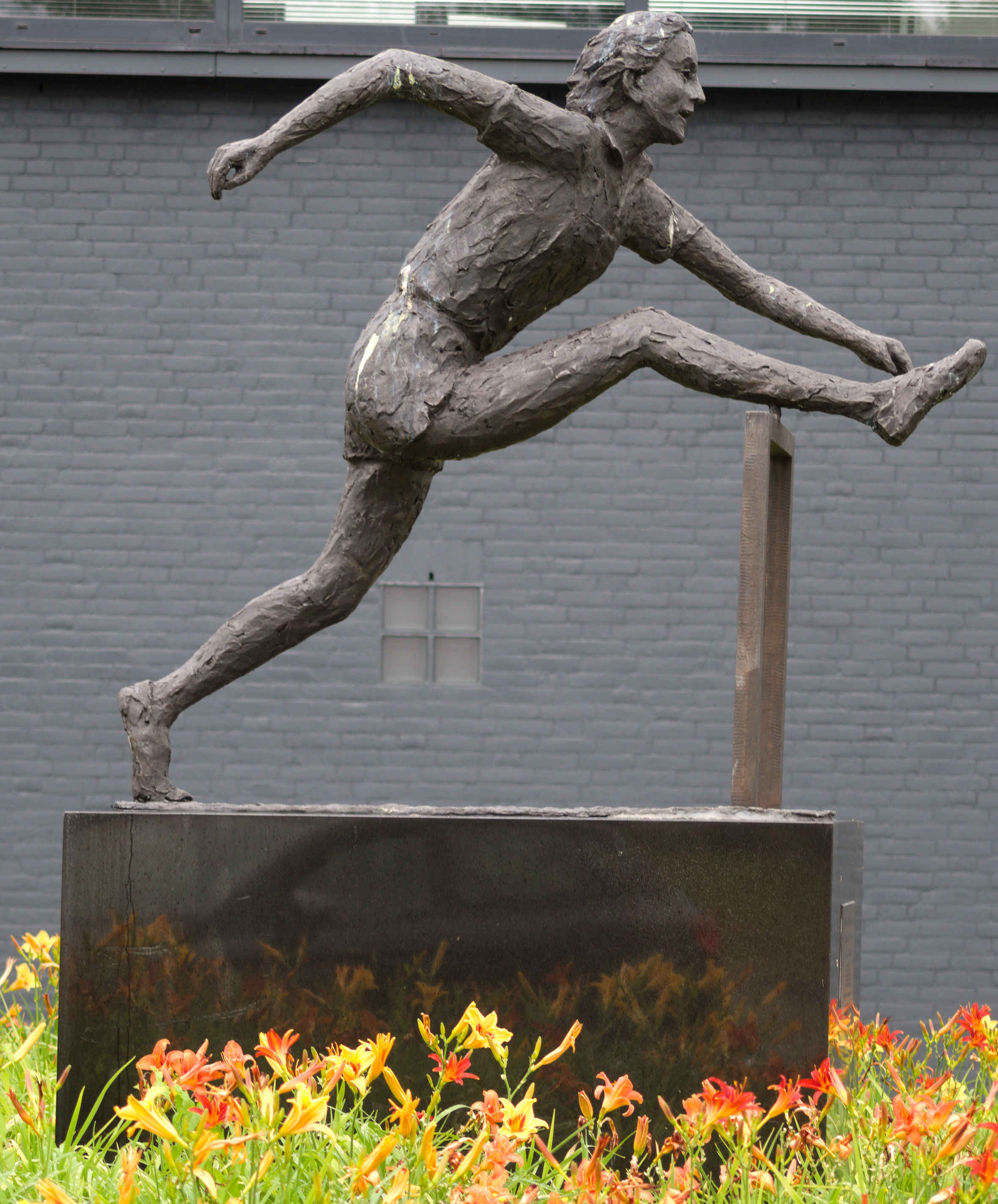
2007 statue of Blankers-Koen in Hengelo.

Blankers-Koen received the following recognition:

- Sauer Cup (Dutch Athlete of the Year): 1937, 1940, 1943
- Associated Press Female Athlete of the Year: 1948
- Knight of the Order of Orange-Nassau: 1949
- Medal of the NOC*NSP: 1949
- Royal Dutch Athletics Federation honorary member: 1949
- IAAF Female Athlete of the 20th Century: 1999
- IAAF Hall of Fame: 2012

The Fanny Blankers-Koen Carrièreprijs was created by NOC*NSF to honour the achievements of Dutch sportspeople and was first given on 9 December 2005. For its inauguration, five people were awarded the prize. Since then, the award has been given to an individual annually.

She was among the women included in the 1001 Vrouwen uit de Nederlandse geschiedenis, a dictionary of biography covering 1001 important Dutchwomen. In a 2004 national poll, Blankers-Koen ranked 29th for De Grootste Nederlander (The Greatest Netherlander); she was the third highest sportsperson (after footballers Johan Cruyff and Marco van Basten) and the seventh highest woman in the poll.

Two public statues of her have been erected in the Netherlands: the first was made by Han Rehm and placed in Rotterdam in 1954 and the second, made by Antoinette Ruiter, was placed on 9 May 2007 in Hengelo. Also in 2007, a text was installed on the fence of the sportspark at Olympiaplein in Amsterdam declaring "Hier trainde Fanny Blankers-Koen" ("Fanny Blankers-Koen trained here").

Several locations have been named in her honour, including Blankers-Koen Park in Newington, New South Wales, the location of the Sydney 2000 Olympic Village, a fire station in Amsterdam (Fanny Blankers-Koenkazerne), a multisport stadium in Hengelo (Fanny Blankers-Koen Stadium), a sports park in Almere (FBK-sportpark), and a sports hall in Hoofddorp where she lived (Fanny Blankers-Koen hal).

Blankers-Koen was honoured with a Google Doodle on 26 April 2018, on her 100th birthday.

== Personal bests ==
=== Individual events ===
Event	Performance	Date	Location	Notes
100 yd	10.6 s	5 July 1952	Wassenaar	NR
100 m	11.5 s	16 June 1948	Amsterdam	WR 1948–1952; NR 1948–1969
200 m	23.9 s	22 September 1952	Antwerp	NR 1952–1967
220 yd	24.2 s	29 June 1950	Brescia	WR 1950–1954
800 m	2.29.0 s	22 September 1935	Amsterdam	NR 1935–1953
80 m hurdles	11.0 s	20 June 1948	Amsterdam	WR 1948–1952; NR 1948–1963
Long jump	6.25 m	19 September 1943	Leiden	WR 1943–1954; NR 1943–1960
High jump	1.71 m	30 May 1943	Amsterdam	WR 1943–1951; NR 1943–1966
Pentathlon	4692 pts	15–16 September 1951	Amsterdam	WR 1951–1953; NR 1951–1968

=== National records ===
Event	Performance	Date	Location
800 m	2:29.0	22 September 1935	Amsterdam
4 × 100 m club team	51.0	14 June 1936	Rijswijk
10 × 100 m club team	2:12.6	14 June 1936	Rijswijk
4 × 100 m club team	50.3	27 June 1936	Amsterdam
Relay race (200–100–80–60 m)	59.2	12 July 1936	Haarlem
4 × 100 m national team	48.4	8 August 1936	Berlin
4 × 100 m club team	50.1	6 September 1936	Amsterdam
80 m	10.0	29 August 1937	Doetinchem
100 yd	11.2	29 August 1937	Doetinchem
Pentathlon	335 pts	12 September 1937	Rotterdam
100 yd	11.0	19 June 1938	Amsterdam
60 m	7.5	31 July 1938	Amsterdam
Long jump	5.80 m	3 June 1939	Mitcham, London
Long jump	5.97 m	30 July 1939	Berlin
100 m	11.9	20 August 1939	Amsterdam
100 m	11.7	26 July 1942	Eindhoven
Long jump	6.00 m	26 July 1942	Eindhoven
80 m hurdles	11.7	13 September 1942	Leiden
80 m hurdles	11.3	20 September 1942	Amsterdam
High jump	1.71 m	30 May 1943	Amsterdam
200 m	24.5	27 June 1943	Rotterdam
Long jump	6.08 m	4 July 1943	Amsterdam
Pentathlon	339 pts	28–29 August 1943	Amsterdam
Long jump	6.25 m	19 September 1943	Leiden
100 yd	10.8	18 May 1944	Amsterdam
4 × 110 yd nat team	48.8	18 May 1944	Amsterdam
4 × 200 m nat team	1:41.0	27 August 1944	Hilversum
4 × 100 m national team	47.8	25 August 1946	Oslo
200 m	24.2	25 April 1948	Lyon
100 m	11.5 †	13 June 1948	Amsterdam
4 × 100 m national team	47.7	13 June 1948	Amsterdam
80 m hurdles	11.0	20 June 1948	Amsterdam
4 × 100 m national team	47.5	25 July 1948	Rijswijk
4 × 100 m national team	47.4	25 July 1948	Rijswijk
4 × 110 yd nat team	47.4	25 July 1948	Rijswijk
100 yd	10.8	27 August 1948	Dublin
4 × 200 m club team	1.46.6	4 June 1950	Amsterdam
200 m	24.1	22 July 1950	Rotterdam
4 × 100 m club team	48.2	6 August 1950	Amsterdam
200 m	24.0	27 August 1950	Brussels
4 × 100 m national team	47.4	27 August 1950	Brussels
Pentathlon	4692 pts	15–16 September 1951	Amsterdam
10 × 100 m club team	2:04.1	1 July 1952	Amsterdam
100 yd	10.6	5 July 1952	The Hague
200 m	23.9 †	23 September 1952	Antwerp
4 × 200 m club team	1:41.2	26 July 1953	Amsterdam

- † Blankers-Koen ran national record times of 11.4 and 23.7 seconds for the 100 m and 200 m, respectively, at the 1952 Dutch Athletics Championships. However, these records were later rescinded after it was shown that the collapse of a nearby railway track had caused the running track to be excessively downhill.

== Competition results ==
=== International competitions ===
Information from her World Athletics profile unless noted otherwise.

Year	Competition	Venue	Position	Event	Notes
1936	Olympic Games	Berlin, Germany	6th	High jump	1.55 m
1936	Olympic Games	Berlin, Germany	5th	4 × 100 m	48.8 h
1938	European Championships	Vienna, Austria	3rd	100 m	12.0 h
1938	European Championships	Vienna, Austria	3rd	200 m	24.9 h
1946	European Championships	Oslo, Norway	– (sf)	100 m	DNF
1946	European Championships	Oslo, Norway	4th	High jump	1.57 m
1946	European Championships	Oslo, Norway	1st	80 m hurdles	11.8 h
1946	European Championships	Oslo, Norway	1st	4 × 100 m	47.8 h
1948	Olympic Games	London, United Kingdom	1st	100 m	11.9 h
1948	Olympic Games	London, United Kingdom	1st	80 m hurdles	11.2 h
1948	Olympic Games	London, United Kingdom	1st	200 m	24.4 h
1948	Olympic Games	London, United Kingdom	1st	4 × 100 m	47.5 h
1950	European Championships	Brussels, Belgium	1st	100 m	11.7 h
1950	European Championships	Brussels, Belgium	1st	80 m hurdles	11.1 h
1950	European Championships	Brussels, Belgium	1st	200 m	24.0 h
1950	European Championships	Brussels, Belgium	2nd	4 × 100 m	47.4 h
1952	Olympic Games	Helsinki, Finland	– (sf)	100 m	DNS
1952	Olympic Games	Helsinki, Finland	– (final)	80 m hurdles	DNF

=== National titles ===
Dutch Athletics Championships
Event	Year(s)
100 m	1937, 1938, 1939, 1940, 1942, 1943, 1944, 1946, 1947, 1948, 1949, 1951, 1952
200 m	1936, 1937, 1938, 1939, 1940, 1944, 1946, 1947, 1948, 1950, 1951, 1952
80 m hurdles	1940, 1944, 1946, 1947, 1948, 1949, 1950, 1951, 1952, 1953, 1954
High jump	1936, 1937, 1939, 1940, 1946, 1947, 1948, 1949, 1950, 1951
Long jump	1939, 1940, 1942, 1944, 1946, 1947, 1948, 1950, 1951
Shot put	1947, 1955
Pentathlon	1937

== Bibliography ==
- Bijkerk, Ton (May 2004). "Fanny Blankers-Koen: A Biography". Journal of Olympic History. 12–2: 56–60.
- Blankers, Jan; Van Leeuwen, Aad (1949). Fanny : de geschiedenis van 4 gouden medailles. 's-Graveland : Konings Pyramide.
- Kooman, Kees (2003). Een koningin met mannenbenen. Amsterdam: nl: L.J. Veen. ISBN 90-204-0820-8. OCLC 56809653.

Records
Preceded by Claudia Testoni	80 metres hurdles world record holder 20 September 1942 – 23 July 1952	Succeeded by Shirley Strickland
Preceded by Ilsebill Pfenning	High jump world record holder 30 May 1943 – 7 July 1951	Succeeded by Sheila Lerwill
Preceded by Stanisława Walasiewicz	100 metres world record holder 5 September 1943 – 22 July 1952	Succeeded by Marjorie Jackson-Nelson
Preceded by Christel Schulz	Long jump world record holder 19 September 1943 – 20 February 1954	Succeeded by Yvette Williams
Awards
Preceded by Wil van Beveren	Sauer Cup; 1937; 1940; 1943	Succeeded by Nel van Balen Blanken
Preceded by Jan Brasser	Sauer Cup; 1937; 1940; 1943	Succeeded by Wim Peters
Preceded by Chris Berger	Sauer Cup; 1937; 1940; 1943	Succeeded by Women's relay team
