= Gisela Mauermayer =

German discus thrower

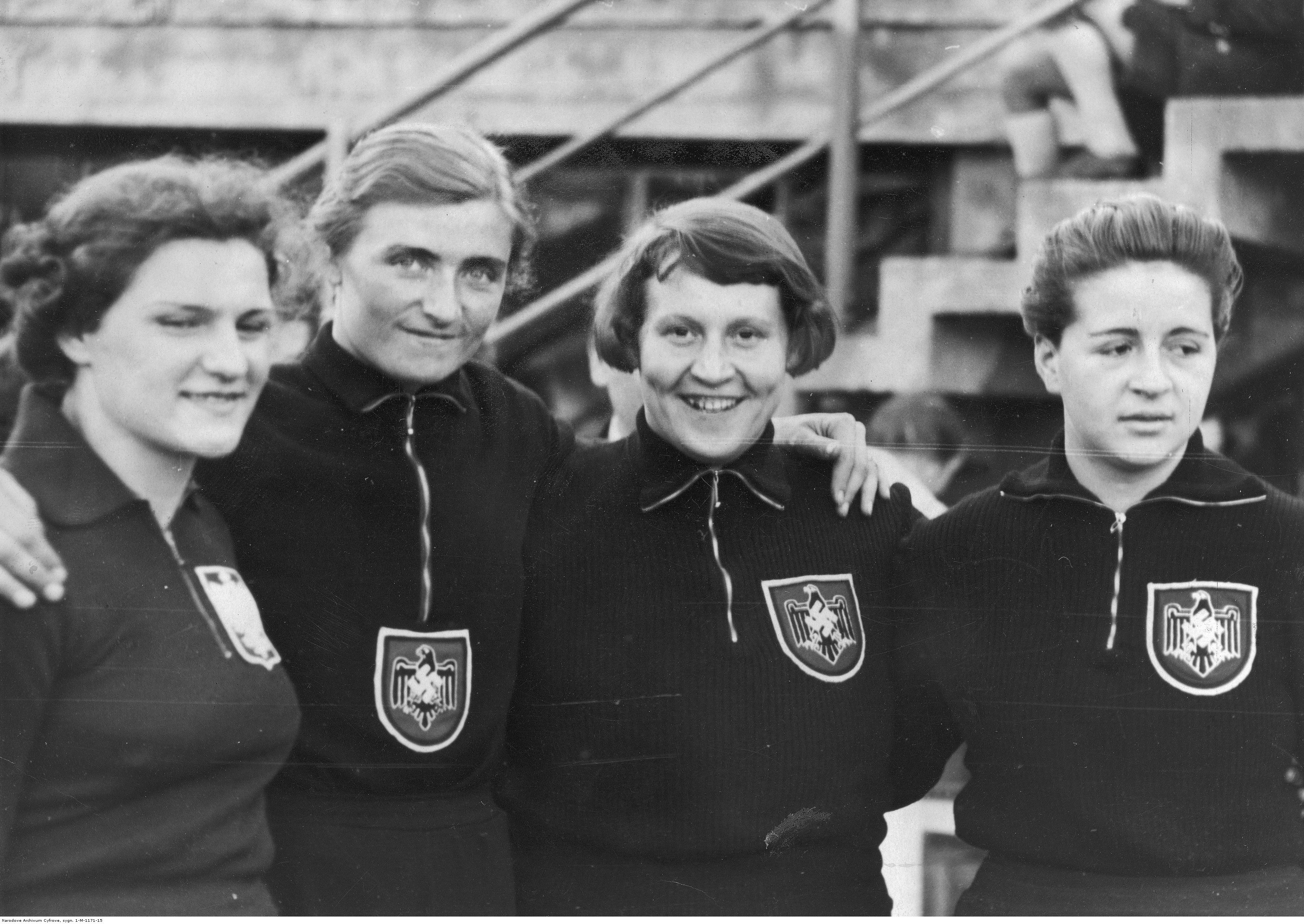
- (Second to the left) Gisela in 1938

Personal information
- Born: 24 November 1913 Munich, German Empire
- Died: 9 January 1995 (aged 81) Munich, Germany

Sport
- Sport: Discus throw, Shot Put
- Events: Discus Throw, Shot Put
Medal record
Women's athletics
Representing Germany
Olympic Games
Gold medal – first place	1936 Berlin	Discus throw
Women's World Games
Gold medal – first place	1934 London	Shot put
Gold medal – first place	1934 London	Pentathlon
Silver medal – second place	1934 London	Discus throw
European Championships
Gold medal – first place	1938 Vienna	Discus throw
Silver medal – second place	1938 Vienna	Shot put

Gisela Mauermayer (24 November 1913 – 9 January 1995) was a German athlete who competed mainly in the discus. She won the gold medal at the 1936 Summer Olympics held in Berlin, Germany.

== Biography ==
Gisela Mauermayer was born on 24 November 1913 in the German Empire in Munich.

In 1932, Gisela became a member of the Nazi Party.

In the 1934 Women's World Games in London, she won gold in shot put and pentathlon, and silver in discus. When the 1936 Summer Olympics were held in Berlin, she competed and won gold in discus for Nazi Germany.

After the Second World War, she became a biologist and chief librarian at the Zoological State Library in Munich, West Germany from 1954 - 1975. During the 1952 Olympics in Helshinki, Finland, she was a supervisor for West Germany's women Olympic team. In 1967, she became a member of the German National Olympic Committee.

She died in Munich on 9 January 1995.

Records
Preceded by (Poland) Jadwiga Wajs	Women's Discus World Record Holder; 2 June 1935 – 8 August 1948	Succeeded by (Soviet Union) Nina Dumbadze
