= Otylia Tabacka =

Polish middle-distance runner

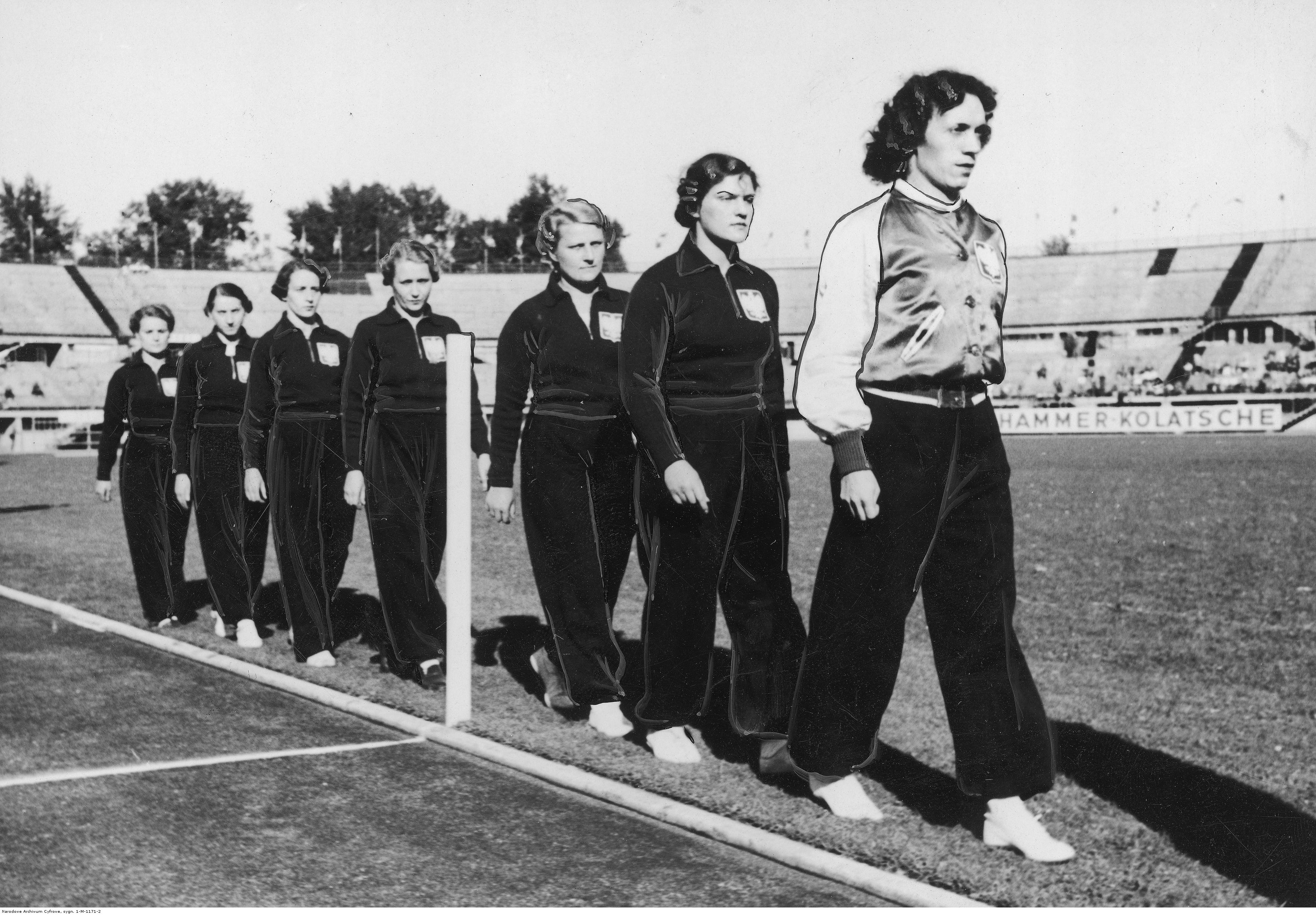
- Otylia Kałuża (fourth from the left) at the European Athletics Championships in Vienna (1938).

Personal information
- Nationality: Polish
- Born: 23 May 1907 Orzesche, German Empire
- Died: 23 October 1981 (aged 74) Chorzów, Poland

Sport
- Sport: Middle-distance running
- Event: 800 metres
Medal record
Women's athletics
Representing Poland
European Championships
Silver medal – second place	1938 Vienna	4×100 m

Otylia Tabacka-Kałuża (23 May 1907 – 23 October 1981) was a Polish middle-distance runner. She competed in the women's 800 metres at the 1928 Summer Olympics.
