= Stanisława Walasiewicz =

Polish-American athlete (1911–1980)

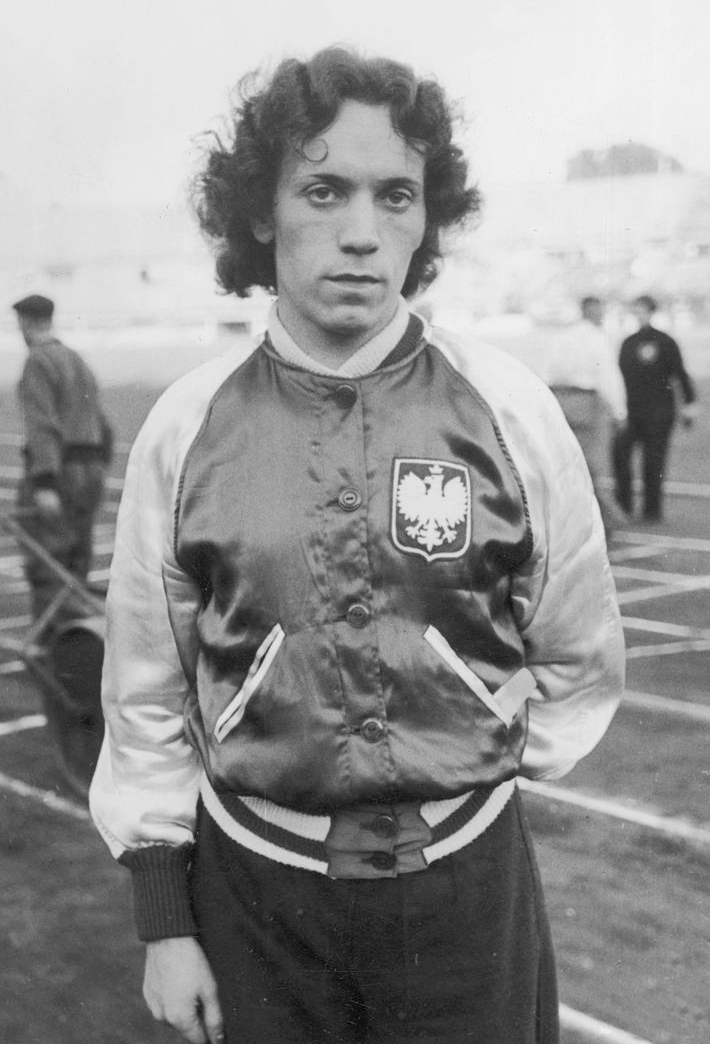
- Stanisława Walasiewicz in 1938

Personal information
- Born: 3 April 1911 Wierzchownia, Kingdom of Poland, Russian Empire
- Died: 4 December 1980 (aged 69) Cleveland, Ohio, United States
- Height: 1.74 m (5 ft 9 in)
- Weight: 60 kg (132 lb)

Sport
- Sport: Athletics
- Events: 100 m, 200 m, long jump Discus (A)mateur))
- Club: Warszawianka, Warszawa; Legia Warszawa

Achievements and titles
- Personal bests: 100 yd – 10.5 (1944); 100 m – 11.6 (1937); 200 m – 23.6 (1935) long jump – 6.12 m (1939)
Medal record
Women's athletics
Representing Poland
Event	1st	2nd	3rd
Olympic Games	1	1	0
World Championships	0	0	0
European Championships	2	0	0
Women's World Games	4	2	0
Total	7	3	0
Olympic Games
Gold medal – first place	1932 Los Angeles	100 m
Silver medal – second place	1936 Berlin	100 m
Women's World Games
Gold medal – first place	1930 Prague	60 m
Gold medal – first place	1930 Prague	100 m
Gold medal – first place	1930 Prague	200 m
Gold medal – first place	1934 London	60 m
Silver medal – second place	1934 London	100 m
Silver medal – second place	1934 London	200 m
Bronze medal – third place	1930 Prague	4×100 m
European Championships
Gold medal – first place	1938 Paris	100 m
Gold medal – first place	1938 Paris	200 m
Silver medal – second place	1938 Paris	4×100 m
Silver medal – second place	1938 Paris	Long jump

Stanisława Walasiewicz (3 April 1911 – 4 December 1980), also known as Stefania Walasiewicz, and Stella Walsh, was a Polish-American track and field athlete, who became a women's Olympic champion in the 100 metres. Born in Poland and raised in the United States, she became an American citizen in 1947.

== Background ==
Walasiewicz was born on 3 April 1911 in Wierzchownia (now Brodnica County), so-called Congress Poland. Her family emigrated to the United States when she was three months old. Her parents, Julian and Weronika Walasiewicz (in USA Veronica), settled in Cleveland, Ohio, where her father found a job as a steel mill worker. Her family called her Stasia, a common Polish diminutive of her Christian name, which later led to the nickname Stella, as she was known in the United States of America.

== Athletic career ==
Walasiewicz started her athletic career at South High School, located in the historic Slavic Village neighborhood on the east side of Cleveland, Ohio. In 1927, she qualified for a place on the American Olympic team started by the Cleveland Press. However, Walasiewicz was not an American citizen and could not obtain citizenship under the age of 21, so she could not compete. The success of Halina Konopacka, a Polish athlete who won gold in the discus throw at the 1928 Summer Olympics, inspired Walasiewicz to join the local branch of the Sokół movement, a Polish sports and patriotic organization active among the Polish diaspora. During the Pan-Slavic meeting of the Sokół movement in Poznań, she scored her first major international victories; she won five gold medals: in the 60 metre, 100 metre, 200 metre and 400 metre races, as well as the long jump. She was asked to stay in Poland and join the Polish national athletic team, and she continued to run in American challenges and games.

Walasiewicz continued to compete as an amateur while working as a clerk in Cleveland. In the period leading up to the 1932 Summer Olympics, she won American national championships in the 100-yard dash (1930), 220 yard dash (1930–31), and long jump (1930). For her part in interstate athletic championships, the city of Cleveland awarded her a car. She was offered American citizenship; however, just two days before taking her oath of citizenship, she changed her mind and instead adopted Polish citizenship, offered to her by the Polish consulate in New York City. In 1930, she was chosen the most popular Polish athlete by readers of the Przegląd Sportowy (Sports Review) daily.

In the 1932 Summer Olympics, Walasiewicz represented Poland. In the 100 m dash, Walasiewicz equaled then world record of 11.9 seconds and won the gold medal. On the same day, she finished 6th out of 9 in the discus throw event. Upon her return to Poland, she almost instantly became a well-known personality. She was welcomed by crowds in the port of Gdynia, and a few days later, she was awarded the Golden Cross of Merit for her achievements. She was again chosen the most popular Polish person in sports, and held that title for three years.

In spring 1933, Walasiewicz appeared at the Championships of Warsaw, where she won nine gold medals in track and field, including 80 metres hurdling, 4 × 200 relay, and long jump. On 17 September 1933, in Poznań, she beat two world records in one day: 7.4 seconds for the 60 m and 11.8 seconds for the 100 m. Her Olympic success also won her a scholarship at the Warsaw Institute of Physical Education, where she met some of the most notable Polish athletes of the time, including Jadwiga Wajs, Felicja Schabińska, Maria Kwaśniewska, and Janusz Kusociński.

In the 1936 Olympics in Berlin, Walasiewicz attempted to defend her Olympic title for the 100 m dash, but Helen Stephens of the U.S. beat her by 0.02 seconds; Walasiewicz won the silver medal. Stephens was accused by a Polish newspaper reporter of being male and was given a genital inspection by the International Olympic Committee, which confirmed her gender as female.

After the Olympic Games, Walasiewicz moved to the US and resumed her amateur career. During and after World War II, she won American national championships in the 100 metres (1943, 1944 and 1948), the 200 metres (1939–1940 and 1942–1948), the discus throw (1941–1942), and the long jump (1938–1946, 1948 and 1951).

In 1947, she accepted American citizenship, and she later married aviation draftsman Harry Olson in 1956. Although the marriage did not last long, she continued to use the name Stella Walsh Olson for the rest of her life. She won her last U.S. title in 1951 at the age of 40. She was inducted into the U.S. Track and Field Hall of Fame in 1975.

== Post-athletic career ==
After her retirement, she continued to be active in a variety of Polish sport associations in the U.S., where she organized championships and helped young athletes. She also funded a variety of awards for Polish sports people living in America. In 1974, Stella Walsh was inducted into the National Polish-American Sports Hall of Fame. Stella Walsh was a contestant on the 9 June 1954 episode of the radio quiz program You Bet Your Life, hosted by Groucho Marx.

== Death ==
Walsh was killed during an armed robbery in a parking lot in Cleveland, on December 4, 1980. She was buying ribbons for a welcoming ceremony for visiting Polish basketball players when the assault occurred.

== Intersex status ==
An autopsy after Walsh's death showed that she was intersex, although her precise condition was not made clear. According to reports, she had a male reproductive system including a non-functioning underdeveloped penis, an abnormal urethra, small testes, and a small prostate. She lacked female sex organs, such as a vagina, uterus, or ovaries. Walsh also reportedly had genetic mosaicism. Most of her cells contained XY chromosomes, but some contained a single X0 chromosome. Cuyahoga County coroner Samuel Gerber said that Walasiewicz was "socially, culturally and legally" a woman, but that her sex would have been ambiguous at birth.

The neighborhood she grew up in was to an extent aware of her condition and saw no reason to bring it to outsiders' attention. A childhood friend recalled her once saying aloud that she wondered why God had done this to her.

== Legacy ==
In Cleveland, on Broadway Avenue, there is a city-owned recreational center named after Stella Walsh. It is attached to Cleveland South High School. She is buried in Calvary Cemetery in Cleveland, Ohio.

Walasiewicz was discussed on BBC Radio 4's The Long View in April 2019 when the contentious issue was the "Gender in women's sport". Stella was also the subject of the documentary Stella Walsh directed by Rob Lucas of American Stories fame. The documentary focused on her gender ambiguity and untimely death.

== See also ==
- Gender verification in sports
