= 1938 European Athletics Championships =

2nd European Championships
- Logo for the women's competition in Vienna
- Dates: 3–5 September (men); 17–18 September (women)
- Host city: Paris, France (men); Vienna, Germany (women)
- Venue: Stade Olympique de Colombes (men); Praterstadion (women)
- Events: 32
- Participation: 352 athletes from 23 nations
- Records set: 1 world record 1 European record

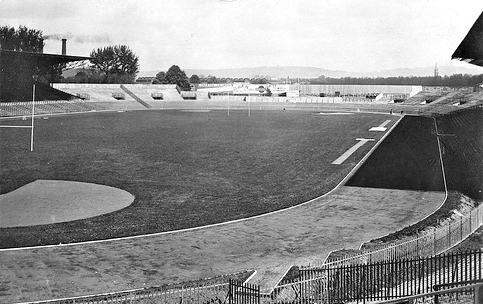
The host stadium in Paris

The 2nd European Athletics Championships was a continental athletics competition for European athletes which was held in two places in 1938. The men's event took place in Paris, France between 3–5 September while the women's events were in Vienna, Germany (which had annexed Austria earlier that year) on 17 and 18 September. A total of 32 events were contested at the two competitions, containing 23 events for men and 9 for women. This was the first time that events for women were held and the only occasion on which the competition was held in two separate locations.

Germany topped the medals table with twelve gold medals and 32 in total. Finland won the second greatest number of gold medals (five) and eleven medals in total. The next most successful nations were Great Britain (four golds and eight overall) and Sweden (three golds and a total of thirteen medals). France won a medal of each colour in Paris, with Prudent Joye the sole Frenchman to win a gold for the hosts of the men's championships.

In the men's competition at Stade Olympique de Colombes in Paris, Donald Finlay of Great Britain broke the European record to win the 110 metres hurdles. Tinus Osendarp of the Netherlands won a sprint double, breaking two championship records. World record holder Sydney Wooderson took victory in the 1500 metres while Olympic gold medallists Matti Järvinen (javelin), Karl Hein (hammer) and Harold Whitlock (50 km walk) won their specialities. Finnish runners Taisto Mäki, Ilmari Salminen and Väinö Muinonen won all three of the long distance running events at the championships, upholding the country's reputation as the Flying Finns. Contemporaneous reports on the men's event were given in the Glasgow Herald.

Stanisława Walasiewicz of Poland excelled in the women's events at the Praterstadion in Vienna, winning both the 100 and 200 metres, as well as silver medals in the long jump and 4 × 100 metres relay. Italian athlete Claudia Testoni set a world record of 11.6 seconds over the 80 metres hurdles. Outside these highlights, the German women dominated the competition by winning 15 of the 27 women's medals on offer. Among them were Käthe Krauß (who won two silvers in the sprints), 1936 Berlin Olympics champion Gisela Mauermayer (who won the discus and a silver in the shot put) and Lisa Gelius, who completed a usual double of silver in the hurdles and gold in the javelin throw. Among the minor medallists was Fanny Blankers-Koen, who won the first international medals of her highly successful career. Dora Ratjen was the initial winner of the women's high jump, but this was rescinded after it was discovered that he was in fact a man. A contemporaneous report on the women's event was given in the Glasgow Herald.

== Medal summary ==
Complete results were published.

=== Men ===
Event	Gold		Silver		Bronze	
100 metres	Tinus Osendarp (NED)	10.5 CR	Orazio Mariani (ITA)	10.6	Lennart Strandberg (SWE)	10.6
200 metres	Tinus Osendarp (NED)	21.2 CR	Jakob Scheuring (GER)	21.6	Alan Pennington (GBR)	21.6
400 metres	Godfrey Brown (GBR)	47.4 CR	Karl Baumgarten (NED)	48.2	Erich Linnhoff (GER)	48.8
800 metres	Rudolf Harbig (GER)	1:50.6 CR	Jacques Levèque (FRA)	1:51.6	Mario Lanzi (ITA)	1:52.0
1500 metres	Sydney Wooderson (GBR)	3:53.6 CR	Joseph Mostert (BEL)	3:54.5	Luigi Beccali (ITA)	3:55.2
5000 metres	Taisto Mäki (FIN)	14:26.8 CR	Henry Jonsson (SWE)	14:27.4	Kauko Pekuri (FIN)	14:29.2
10,000 metres	Ilmari Salminen (FIN)	30:52.0 CR	Giuseppe Beviacqua (ITA)	30:53.2	Max Syring (GER)	30:57.8
110 metres hurdles	Don Finlay (GBR)	14.3 CR, AR	Håkan Lidman (SWE)	14.5	Reinden Brasser (NED)	14.8
400 metres hurdles	Prudent Joye (FRA)	53.1 CR	József Kovács (HUN)	53.3	Kell Areskoug (SWE)	53.6
3000 metres steeplechase	Lars Larsson (SWE)	9:16.2	Ludwig Kaindl (GER)	9:19.2	Alf Lindblad (FIN)	9:21.4
4 × 100 metres relay	Germany (GER); Manfred Kersch; Gerd Hornberger; Karl Neckermann; Jakob Scheuring	40.9 CR	Sweden (SWE); Gösta Klemming; Åke Stenqvist; Lennart Lindgren; Lennart Strandberg	41.1	Great Britain (GBR); Maurice Scarr; Godfrey Brown; Arthur Sweeney; Ernest Page	41.2
4 × 400 metres relay	Germany (GER); Hermann Blazejezak; Manfred Bues; Erich Linnhoff; Rudolf Harbig	3:13.7 CR	Great Britain (GBR); Jack Barnes; Alfred Baldwin; Alan Pennington; Godfrey Brown	3:14.9	Sweden (SWE); Lars Nilsson; Carl Hendrik Gustafsson; Börje Thomasson; Bertil von Wachenfeldt	3:17.3
Marathon	Väinö Muinonen (FIN)	2:37:28.8 CR	Squire Yarrow (GBR)	2:39:03.0	Henry Palmé (SWE)	2:42:13.6
50 kilometres walk	Harold Whitlock (GBR)	4:41:51 CR	Herbert Dill (GER)	4:43:54	Edgar Bruun (NOR)	4:44:35
High jump	Kurt Lundqvist (SWE)	1.97 m	Kalevi Kotkas (FIN)	1.94 m	Lauri Kalima (FIN)	1.94 m
Pole vault	Karl Sutter (GER)	4.05 m CR	Bo Ljungberg (SWE)	4.00 m	Pierre Ramadier (FRA)	4.00 m
Long jump	Wilhelm Leichum (GER)	7.65 m CR	Arturo Maffei (ITA)	7.61 m	Luz Long (GER)	7.56 m
Triple jump	Onni Rajasaari (FIN)	15.32 m CR	Jouko Norén (FIN)	14.95 m	Karl Kotratschek (GER)	14.73 m
Shot put	Aleksander Kreek (EST)	15.83 m CR	Gerhard Stöck (GER)	15.59 m	Hans Woellke (GER)	15.52 m
Discus throw	Willy Schröder (GER)	49.70 m	Giorgio Oberweger (ITA)	49.48 m	Gunnar Bergh (SWE)	48.72 m
Hammer throw	Karl Hein (GER)	58.77 m CR	Erwin Blask (GER)	57.34 m	Oscar Malmbrant (SWE)	51.23 m
Javelin throw	Matti Järvinen (FIN)	76.87 m CR	Yrjö Nikkanen (FIN)	75.00 m	József Várszegi (HUN)	72.78 m
Decathlon	Olle Bexell (SWE)	6870 pts CR	Witold Gerutto (POL)	6661 pts	Josef Neumann (SUI)	6444 pts
WR world record | AR area record | CR championship record | GR games record | NR national record | OR Olympic record | PB personal best | SB season best | WL world leading (in a given season)

=== Women ===
Event	Gold		Silver		Bronze	
100 metres	Stanisława Walasiewicz (POL)	11.9	Käthe Krauß (GER)	12.0	Fanny Blankers-Koen (NED)	12.0
200 metres	Stanisława Walasiewicz (POL)	23.8	Käthe Krauß (GER)	24.4	Fanny Blankers-Koen (NED)	24.9
80 metres hurdles	Claudia Testoni (ITA)	11.6 WR	Lisa Gelius (GER)	11.7	Catharina Ter Braake (NED)	11.8
4 × 100 metres relay	Germany (GER); Josefine Kohl; Käthe Krauß; Emmy Albus; Ida Kühnel	46.8	Poland (POL); Jadwiga Gawronska; Barbara Ksiazkiewicz; Otylia Kaluzowa; Stanisława Walasiewicz	48.2	Italy (ITA); Maria Alfero; Maria Apollonio; Rosetta Cattaneo; Italia Lucchini	49.4
High jump	Ibolya Csák (HUN)	1.64 m	Nelly van Balen-Blanken (NED)	1.64 m	Feodora zu Solms (GER)	1.64 m
Long jump	Irmgard Praetz (GER)	5.88 m	Stanisława Walasiewicz (POL)	5.81 m	Gisela Voß (GER)	5.47 m
Shot put	Hermine Schröder (GER)	13.29 m	Gisela Mauermayer (GER)	13.27 m	Wanda Flakowicz (POL)	12.55 m
Discus throw	Gisela Mauermayer (GER)	44.80 m	Hilde Sommer (GER)	40.95 m	Paula Mollenhauer (GER)	39.81 m
Javelin throw	Lisa Gelius (GER)	45.58 m	Susanne Pastoors (GER)	44.14 m	Luise Krüger (GER)	42.49 m
WR world record | AR area record | CR championship record | GR games record | NR national record | OR Olympic record | PB personal best | SB season best | WL world leading (in a given season)

== Medal table ==
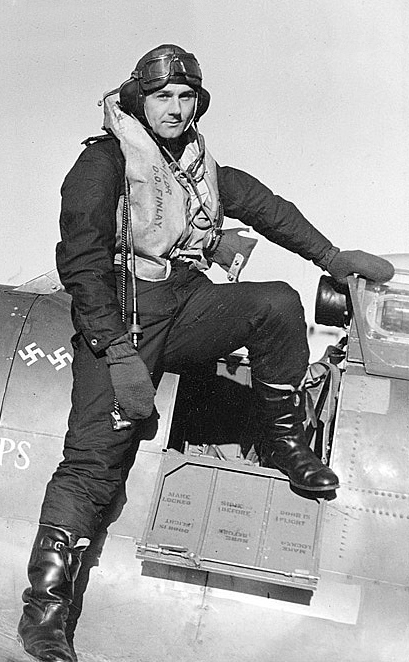
Great Britain's Donald Finlay set a European record to win the 110 m hurdles.

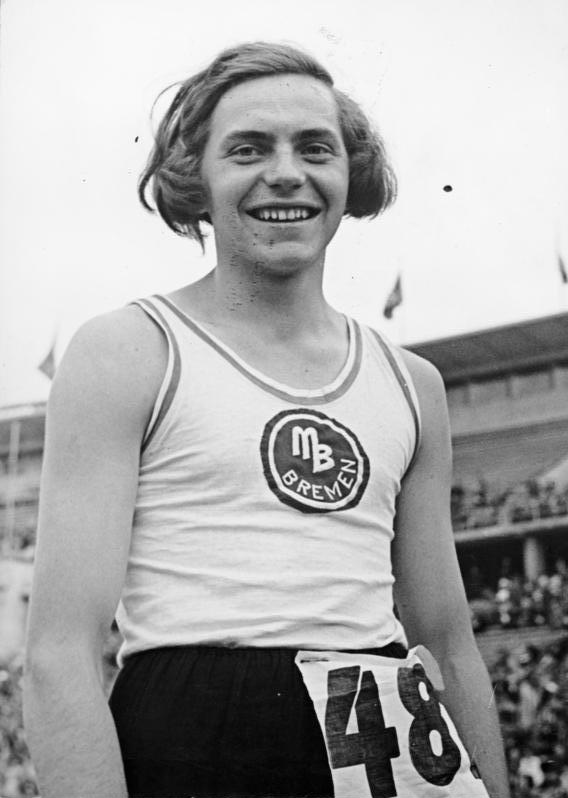
Dora Ratjen's medal in the women's high jump was removed after he revealed himself to be male.

* Host nation (Host nations (Germany & France))

Rank	Nation	Gold	Silver	Bronze	Total
1	Germany (GER)*	12	11	9	32
2	Finland (FIN)	5	3	3	11
3	(United Kingdom) Great Britain	4	2	2	8
4	Sweden (SWE)	3	4	6	13
5	Poland (POL)	2	3	1	6
6	Netherlands (NED)	2	2	4	8
7	Italy (ITA)	1	4	3	8
8	France (FRA)*	1	1	1	3
8	Hungary (HUN)	1	1	1	3
10	Estonia (EST)	1	0	0	1
11	Belgium (BEL)	0	1	0	1
12	Norway (NOR)	0	0	1	1
12	Switzerland (SUI)	0	0	1	1
Totals (13 entries)		32	32	32	96

== Participation ==
According to an unofficial count, 350 athletes from 23 countries participated in the event, two athletes less than the official number of 352 as published.

- Albania (2)
- Belgium (13)
- Czechoslovakia (3)
- Denmark (3)
- Estonia (7)
- Finland (21)
- France (43)
- Germany (50)
- Great Britain (35)
- Greece (5)
- Hungary (25)
- Italy (37)
- Latvia (3)
- Liechtenstein (2)
- Luxembourg (5)
- Netherlands (14)
- Norway (10)
- Poland (15)
- Portugal (1)
- Romania (2)
- Sweden (35)
- Switzerland (17)
- Yugoslavia (2)
