= List of European Athletics Championships medalists (women) =

This is the complete list of women's medalists of the European Athletics Championships.

== Track ==
=== 100 metres ===
Games	Gold	Silver	Bronze
1938 Vienna	Stanisława Walasiewicz (POL)	Käthe Krauss (GER)	Fanny Koen (NED)
1946 Oslo	Yevgeniya Sechenova (URS)	Winifred Jordan (GBR)	Claire Bresolles (FRA)
1950 Brussels	Fanny Blankers-Koen (NED)	Yevgeniya Sechenova (URS)	June Foulds (GBR)
1954 Bern	Irina Turova (URS)	Bertha Brouwer (NED)	Anne Pashley (GBR)
1958 Stockholm	Heather Young (GBR)	Vera Krepkina (URS)	Christa Stubnick (GDR)
1962 Belgrade	Dorothy Hyman (GBR)	Jutta Heine (FRG)	Teresa Ciepły (POL)
1966 Budapest	Ewa Kłobukowska (POL)	Irena Kirszenstein (POL)	Karin Frisch (FRG)
1969 Athens	Petra Vogt (GDR)	Wilma van den Berg (NED)	Anita Neil (GBR)
1971 Helsinki	Renate Stecher (GDR)	Ingrid Mickler-Becker (FRG)	Elfgard Schittenhelm (FRG)
1974 Rome	Irena Szewińska (POL)	Renate Stecher (GDR)	Andrea Lynch (GBR)
1978 Prague	Marlies Göhr (GDR)	Linda Haglund (SWE)	Lyudmila Maslakova (URS)
1982 Athens	Marlies Göhr (GDR)	Bärbel Wöckel (GDR)	Rose-Aimée Bacoul (FRA)
1986 Stuttgart	Marlies Göhr (GDR)	Anelia Nuneva (BUL)	Nelli Cooman (NED)
1990 Split	Katrin Krabbe (GDR)	Silke Möller (GDR)	Kerstin Behrendt (GDR)
1994 Helsinki	Irina Privalova (RUS)	Zhanna Tarnopolskaya (UKR)	Melanie Paschke (GER)
1998 Budapest	Christine Arron (FRA)	Irina Privalova (RUS)	Ekaterini Thanou (GRE)
2002 Munich	Ekaterini Thanou (GRE)	Kim Gevaert (BEL)	Manuela Levorato (ITA)
2006 Gothenburg	Kim Gevaert (BEL)	Yekaterina Grigoryeva (RUS)	Irina Khabarova (RUS)
2010 Barcelona	Verena Sailer (GER)	Véronique Mang (FRA)	Myriam Soumaré (FRA)
2012 Helsinki	Ivet Lalova (BUL)	Olesya Povh (UKR)	Lina Grinčikaitė (LIT)
2014 Zürich	Dafne Schippers (NED)	Myriam Soumaré (FRA)	Ashleigh Nelson (GBR)
2016 Amsterdam	Dafne Schippers (NED)	Ivet Lalova-Collio (BUL)	Mujinga Kambundji (SUI)
2018 Berlin	Dina Asher-Smith (GBR)	Gina Lückenkemper (GER)	Dafne Schippers (NED)
2022 Munich	Gina Lückenkemper (GER)	Mujinga Kambundji (SUI)	Daryll Neita (GBR)
2024 Rome	Dina Asher-Smith (GBR)	Ewa Swoboda (POL)	Zaynab Dosso (ITA)
2026 Birmingham	Amy Hunt (GBR)	Ewa Swoboda (POL)	Delphine Nkansa (BEL)

=== 200 metres ===
Games	Gold	Silver	Bronze
1938 Vienna	Stanisława Walasiewicz (POL)	Käthe Krauss (GER)	Fanny Koen (NED)
1946 Oslo	Yevgeniya Sechenova (URS)	Winifred Jordan (GBR)	Léa Caurla (FRA)
1950 Brussels	Fanny Blankers-Koen (NED)	Yevgeniya Sechenova (URS)	Dorothy Hall (GBR)
1954 Bern	Maria Itkina (URS)	Irina Turova (URS)	Shirley Hampton (GBR)
1958 Stockholm	Barbara Janiszewska (POL)	Hannelore Sadau (GDR)	Maria Itkina (URS)
1962 Belgrade	Jutta Heine (FRG)	Dorothy Hyman (GBR)	Barbara Sobotta (POL)
1966 Budapest	Irena Kirszenstein (POL)	Ewa Kłobukowska (POL)	Vera Popkova (URS)
1969 Athens	Petra Vogt (GDR)	Renate Meissner (GDR)	Val Peat (GBR)
1971 Helsinki	Renate Stecher (GDR)	Györgyi Balogh (HUN)	Irena Szewińska (POL)
1974 Rome	Irena Szewińska (POL)	Renate Stecher (GDR)	Mona-Lisa Pursiainen (FIN)
1978 Prague	Lyudmila Kondratyeva (URS)	Marlies Göhr (GDR)	Carla Bodendorf (GDR)
1982 Athens	Bärbel Wöckel (GDR)	Kathy Smallwood (GBR)	Sabine Rieger (GDR)
1986 Stuttgart	Heike Drechsler (GDR)	Marie-Christine Cazier (FRA)	Silke Gladisch (GDR)
1990 Split	Katrin Krabbe (GDR)	Heike Drechsler (GDR)	Galina Malchugina (URS)
1994 Helsinki	Irina Privalova (RUS)	Zhanna Tarnopolskaya (UKR)	Galina Malchugina (RUS)
1998 Budapest	Irina Privalova (RUS)	Zhanna Pintusevich (UKR)	Melanie Paschke (GER)
2002 Munich	Muriel Hurtis (FRA)	Kim Gevaert (BEL)	Manuela Levorato (ITA)
2006 Gothenburg	Kim Gevaert (BEL)	Yuliya Gushchina (RUS)	Natalia Rusakova (RUS)
2010 Barcelona	Myriam Soumaré (FRA)	Yelyzaveta Bryzhina (UKR)	Aleksandra Fedoriva (RUS)
2012 Helsinki	Mariya Ryemyen (UKR)	Khrystyna Stuy (UKR)	Myriam Soumaré (FRA)
2014 Zürich	Dafne Schippers (NED)	Jodie Williams (GBR)	Myriam Soumaré (FRA)
2016 Amsterdam	Dina Asher-Smith (GBR)	Ivet Lalova-Collio (BUL)	Gina Lückenkemper (GER)
2018 Berlin	Dina Asher-Smith (GBR)	Dafne Schippers (NED)	Jamile Samuel (NED)
2022 Munich	Mujinga Kambundji (SUI)	Dina Asher-Smith (GBR)	Ida Karstoft (DEN)
2024 Rome	Mujinga Kambundji (SUI)	Daryll Neita (GBR)	Hélène Parisot (FRA)
2026 Birmingham	Amy Hunt (GBR)	Rhasidat Adeleke (IRL)	Dina Asher-Smith (GBR)

=== 400 metres ===
Games	Gold	Silver	Bronze
1958 Stockholm	Maria Itkina (URS)	Yekaterina Parlyuk (URS)	Moyra Hiscox (GBR)
1962 Belgrade	Maria Itkina (URS)	Joy Grieveson (GBR)	Tilly van der Zwaard (NED)
1966 Budapest	Anna Chmelková (TCH)	Antónia Munkácsi (HUN)	Monique Noirot (FRA)
1969 Athens	Nicole Duclos (FRA)	Colette Besson (FRA)	Maria Sykora (AUT)
1971 Helsinki	Helga Seidler (GDR)	Inge Bödding (FRG)	Ingelore Lohse (GDR)
1974 Rome	Riitta Salin (FIN)	Ellen Streidt (GDR)	Rita Wilden (FRG)
1978 Prague	Marita Koch (GDR)	Christina Brehmer (GDR)	Irena Szewińska (POL)
1982 Athens	Marita Koch (GDR)	Jarmila Kratochvílová (TCH)	Taťána Kocembová (TCH)
1986 Stuttgart	Marita Koch (GDR)	Olga Vladykina (URS)	Petra Müller (GDR)
1990 Split	Grit Breuer (GDR)	Petra Schersing (GDR)	Marie-José Pérec (FRA)
1994 Helsinki	Marie-José Pérec (FRA)	Svetlana Goncharenko (RUS)	Phylis Smith (GBR)
1998 Budapest	Grit Breuer (GER)	Helena Fuchsová (CZE)	Olga Kotlyarova (RUS)
2002 Munich	Olesya Zykina (RUS)	Grit Breuer (GER)	Lee McConnell (GBR)
2006 Gothenburg	Vania Stambolova (BUL)	Tatyana Veshkurova (RUS)	Olga Zaytseva (RUS)
2010 Barcelona	Kseniya Ustalova (RUS)	Antonina Krivoshapka (RUS)	Libania Grenot (ITA)
2012 Helsinki	Moa Hjelmer (SWE)	Ksenia Zadorina (RUS)	Ilona Usovich (BLR)
2014 Zürich	Libania Grenot (ITA)	Olha Zemlyak (UKR)	Indira Terrero (ESP)
2016 Amsterdam	Libania Grenot (ITA)	Floria Gueï (FRA)	Anyika Onuora (GBR)
2018 Berlin	Justyna Święty-Ersetic (POL)	Maria Belibasaki (GRE)	Lisanne de Witte (NED)
2022 Munich	Femke Bol (NED)	Natalia Kaczmarek (POL)	Anna Kiełbasińska (POL)
2024 Rome	Natalia Kaczmarek (POL)	Rhasidat Adeleke (IRL)	Lieke Klaver (NED)
2026 Birmingham	Henriette Jæger (NOR)	Natalia Bukowiecka (POL)	Lieke Klaver (NED)

=== 800 metres ===
Games	Gold	Silver	Bronze
1954 Bern	Nina Otkalenko (URS)	Diane Leather (GBR)	Lyudmila Lysenko (URS)
1958 Stockholm	Yelizaveta Yermolayeva (URS)	Diane Leather (GBR)	Dzidra Levitska (URS)
1962 Belgrade	Gerda Kraan (NED)	Waltraud Kaufmann (GDR)	Olga Kazi (HUN)
1966 Budapest	Vera Nikolić (YUG)	Zsuzsa Szabó (HUN)	Antje Gleichfeld (FRG)
1969 Athens	Lillian Board (GBR)	Annelise Damm Olesen (DEN)	Vera Nikolić (YUG)
1971 Helsinki	Vera Nikolić (YUG)	Patricia Lowe (GBR)	Rosemary Stirling (GBR)
1974 Rome	Lilyana Tomova (BUL)	Gunhild Hoffmeister (GDR)	Mariana Suman (ROU)
1978 Prague	Tatyana Providokhina (URS)	Nadezhda Mushta (URS)	Zoya Rigel (URS)
1982 Athens	Olga Mineyeva (URS)	Lyudmila Veselkova (URS)	Margrit Klinger (FRG)
1986 Stuttgart	Nadezhda Olizarenko (URS)	Sigrun Wodars (GDR)	Lyubov Gurina (URS)
1990 Split	Sigrun Wodars (GDR)	Christine Wachtel (GDR)	Liliya Nurutdinova (URS)
1994 Helsinki	Lyubov Gurina (RUS)	Natalya Dukhnova (BLR)	Lyudmila Rogachova (RUS)
1998 Budapest	Yelena Afanasyeva (RUS)	Malin Ewerlöf (SWE)	Stephanie Graf (AUT)
2002 Munich	Jolanda Čeplak (SLO)	Mayte Martínez (ESP)	Kelly Holmes (GBR)
2006 Gothenburg	Olga Kotlyarova (RUS)	Svetlana Klyuka (RUS)	Rebecca Lyne (GBR)
2010 Barcelona	Yvonne Hak (NED)	Jenny Meadows (GBR)	Lucia Klocová (SVK)
2012 Helsinki	Lynsey Sharp (GBR)	Maryna Arzamasova (BLR)	Liliya Lobanova (UKR)
2014 Zürich	Maryna Arzamasova (BLR)	Lynsey Sharp (GBR)	Joanna Jóźwik (POL)
2016 Amsterdam	Nataliya Pryshchepa (UKR)	Rénelle Lamote (FRA)	Lovisa Lindh (SWE)
2018 Berlin	Nataliya Pryshchepa (UKR)	Rénelle Lamote (FRA)	Olha Lyakhova (UKR)
2022 Munich	Keely Hodgkinson (GBR)	Rénelle Lamote (FRA)	Anna Wielgosz (POL)
2024 Rome	Keely Hodgkinson (GBR)	Gabriela Gajanová (SVK)	Anaïs Bourgoin (FRA)
2026 Birmingham	Audrey Werro (SUI)	Keely Hodgkinson (GBR)	Femke Broeders-Bol (NED)

=== 1500 metres ===
Games	Gold	Silver	Bronze
1969 Athens	Jaroslava Jehličková (TCH)	Maria Gommers (NED)	Paola Pigni (ITA)
1971 Helsinki	Karin Burneleit (GDR)	Gunhild Hoffmeister (GDR)	Ellen Tittel (FRG)
1974 Rome	Gunhild Hoffmeister (GDR)	Lilyana Tomova (BUL)	Grete Andersen (NOR)
1978 Prague	Giana Romanova (URS)	Natalia Mărășescu (ROU)	Totka Petrova (BUL)
1982 Athens	Olga Dvirna (URS)	Zamira Zaytseva (URS)	Gabriella Dorio (ITA)
1986 Stuttgart	Ravilya Agletdinova (URS)	Tetyana Samolenko (URS)	Doina Melinte (ROU)
1990 Split	Snežana Pajkić (YUG)	Ellen Kiessling (GDR)	Sandra Gasser (SUI)
1994 Helsinki	Lyudmila Rogachova (RUS)	Kelly Holmes (GBR)	Yekaterina Podkopayeva (RUS)
1998 Budapest	Svetlana Masterkova (RUS)	Carla Sacramento (POR)	Anita Weyermann (SUI)
2002 Munich	Süreyya Ayhan (TUR)	Gabriela Szabo (ROU)	Tatyana Tomashova (RUS)
2006 Gothenburg	Tatyana Tomashova (RUS)	Yuliya Chizhenko (RUS)	Daniela Yordanova (BUL)
2010 Barcelona	Nuria Fernández (ESP)	Hind Dehiba (FRA)	Natalia Rodríguez (ESP)
2012 Helsinki	Nuria Fernández (ESP)	Diana Sujew (GER)	Tereza Čapková (CZE)
2014 Zürich	Sifan Hassan (NED)	Abeba Aregawi (SWE)	Laura Weightman (GBR)
2016 Amsterdam	Angelika Cichocka (POL)	Sifan Hassan (NED)	Ciara Mageean (IRL)
2018 Berlin	Laura Muir (GBR)	Sofia Ennaoui (POL)	Laura Weightman (GBR)
2022 Munich	Laura Muir (GBR)	Ciara Mageean (IRL)	Sofia Ennaoui (POL)
2024 Rome	Ciara Mageean (IRL)	Georgia Hunter Bell (GBR)	Agathe Guillemot (FRA)
2026 Birmingham	Georgia Hunter Bell (GBR)	Klaudia Kazimierska (POL)	Patricia Silva (POR)

=== 3000 metres (discontinued event) ===
Games	Gold	Silver	Bronze
1974 Rome	Nina Holmén (FIN)	Lyudmila Bragina (URS)	Joyce Smith (GBR)
1978 Prague	Svetlana Ulmasova (URS)	Natalia Mărășescu (ROU)	Grete Waitz (NOR)
1982 Athens	Svetlana Ulmasova (URS)	Maricica Puică (ROU)	Yelena Sipatova (URS)
1986 Stuttgart	Olga Bondarenko (URS)	Maricica Puică (ROU)	Yvonne Murray (GBR)
1990 Split	Yvonne Murray (GBR)	Yelena Romanova (URS)	Roberta Brunet (ITA)
1994 Helsinki	Sonia O'Sullivan (IRL)	Yvonne Murray (GBR)	Gabriela Szabo (ROU)

=== 5000 metres ===
Games	Gold	Silver	Bronze
1998 Budapest	Sonia O'Sullivan (IRL)	Gabriela Szabo (ROU)	Marta Domínguez (ESP)
2002 Munich	Marta Domínguez (ESP)	Sonia O'Sullivan (IRL)	Yelena Zadorozhnaya (RUS)
2006 Gothenburg	Marta Domínguez (ESP)	Liliya Shobukhova (RUS)	Elvan Abeylegesse (TUR)
2010 Barcelona	Elvan Abeylegesse (TUR)	Sara Moreira (POR)	Jéssica Augusto (POR)
2012 Helsinki	Olga Golovkina (RUS)	Sara Moreira (POR)	Julia Bleasdale (GBR)
2014 Zürich	Meraf Bahta (SWE)	Sifan Hassan (NED)	Susan Kuijken (NED)
2016 Amsterdam	Yasemin Can (TUR)	Meraf Bahta (SWE)	Stephanie Twell (GBR)
2018 Berlin	Sifan Hassan (NED)	Eilish McColgan (GBR)	Yasemin Can (TUR)
2022 Munich	Konstanze Klosterhalfen (GER)	Yasemin Can (TUR)	Eilish McColgan (GBR)
2024 Rome	Nadia Battocletti (ITA)	Karoline Bjerkeli Grøvdal (NOR)	Marta García (ESP)
2026 Birmingham	Nadia Battocletti (ITA)	Marta García (ESP)	Micol Majori (ITA)

=== 10,000 metres ===
Games	Gold	Silver	Bronze
1986 Stuttgart	Ingrid Kristiansen (NOR)	Olga Bondarenko (URS)	Ulrike Bruns (GDR)
1990 Split	Yelena Romanova (URS)	Kathrin Ullrich (GDR)	Annette Sergent (FRA)
1994 Helsinki	Fernanda Ribeiro (POR)	Conceição Ferreira (POR)	Daria Nauer (SUI)
1998 Budapest	Sonia O'Sullivan (IRL)	Fernanda Ribeiro (POR)	Lidia Șimon (ROU)
2002 Munich	Paula Radcliffe (GBR)	Sonia O'Sullivan (IRL)	Lyudmila Biktasheva (RUS)
2006 Gothenburg	Inga Abitova (RUS)	Susanne Wigene (NOR)	Lidiya Grigoryeva (RUS)
2010 Barcelona	Elvan Abeylegesse (TUR)	Jéssica Augusto (POR)	Hilda Kibet (NED)
2012 Helsinki	Ana Dulce Félix (POR)	Jo Pavey (GBR)	Olha Skrypak (UKR)
2014 Zürich	Jo Pavey (GBR)	Clémence Calvin (FRA)	Laila Traby (FRA)
2016 Amsterdam	Yasemin Can (TUR)	Ana Dulce Félix (POR)	Karoline Bjerkeli Grøvdal (NOR)
2018 Berlin	Lonah Chemtai Salpeter (ISR)	Susan Krumins (NED)	Alina Reh (GER)
2022 Munich	Yasemin Can (TUR)	Eilish McColgan (GBR)	Lonah Chemtai Salpeter (ISR)
2024 Rome	Nadia Battocletti (ITA)	Diane van Es (NED)	Megan Keith (GBR)
2026 Birmingham	Nadia Battocletti (ITA)	Maureen Koster (NED)	Jana van Lent (BEL)

=== Half marathon ===
Games	Gold	Silver	Bronze
2016 Amsterdam	Sara Moreira (POR)	Veronica Inglese (ITA)	Jéssica Augusto (POR)
2024 Rome	Karoline Bjerkeli Grøvdal (NOR)	Joan Chelimo Melly (ROU)	Calli Hauger-Thackery (GBR)

=== Marathon ===
Games	Gold	Silver	Bronze
1982 Athens	Rosa Mota (POR)	Laura Fogli (ITA)	Ingrid Kristiansen (NOR)
1986 Stuttgart	Rosa Mota (POR)	Laura Fogli (ITA)	Yekaterina Khramenkova (URS)
1990 Split	Rosa Mota (POR)	Valentina Yegorova (URS)	Maria Rebelo (FRA)
1994 Helsinki	Manuela Machado (POR)	Maria Curatolo (ITA)	Adriana Barbu (ROU)
1998 Budapest	Manuela Machado (POR)	Madina Biktagirova (RUS)	Maura Viceconte (ITA)
2002 Munich	Maria Guida (ITA)	Luminita Zaituc (GER)	Sonja Oberem (GER)
2006 Gothenburg	Ulrike Maisch (GER)	Olivera Jevtić (SRB)	Irina Permitina (RUS)
2010 Barcelona	Anna Incerti (ITA)	Tetyana Filonyuk (UKR)	Isabellah Andersson (SWE)
2012 Helsinki	Not included in the program		
2014 Zürich	Christelle Daunay (FRA)	Valeria Straneo (ITA)	Jéssica Augusto (POR)
2016 Amsterdam	Replaced by half marathon		
2018 Berlin	Volha Mazuronak (BLR)	Clémence Calvin (FRA)	Eva Vrabcová-Nývltová (CZE)
2022 Munich	Aleksandra Lisowska (POL)	Matea Parlov Koštro (CRO)	Nienke Brinkman (NED)
2024 Rome	Replaced by half marathon		
2026 Birmingham	Alisa Vainio (FIN)	Lili Anna Vindics-Tóth (HUN)	Abbie Donnelly (GBR)

=== 80 metres hurdles (discontinued event) ===
Games	Gold	Silver	Bronze
1938 Vienna	Claudia Testoni (ITA)	Lisa Gelius (GER)	Kitty ter Braake (NED)
1946 Oslo	Fanny Blankers-Koen (NED)	Elene Gok'ieli (URS)	Valentina Fokina (URS)
1950 Brussels	Fanny Blankers-Koen (NED)	Maureen Dyson (GBR)	Micheline Ostermeyer (FRA)
1954 Bern	Maria Golubnichaya (URS)	Anneliese Seonbuchner (FRG)	Pam Seaborne (GBR)
1958 Stockholm	Galina Bystrova (URS)	Zenta Kopp (FRG)	Gisela Birkemeyer (GDR)
1962 Belgrade	Teresa Ciepły (POL)	Karin Balzer (GDR)	Erika Fisch (FRG) Maria Piątkowska (POL)
1966 Budapest	Karin Balzer (GDR)	Karin Frisch (FRG)	Elżbieta Bednarek (POL)

=== 100 metres hurdles ===
Games	Gold	Silver	Bronze
1969 Athens	Karin Balzer (GDR)	Bärbel Podeswa (GDR)	Teresa Nowak (POL)
1971 Helsinki	Karin Balzer (GDR)	Annelie Ehrhardt (GDR)	Teresa Sukniewicz (POL)
1974 Rome	Annelie Ehrhardt (GDR)	Annerose Fiedler (GDR)	Teresa Nowak (POL)
1978 Prague	Johanna Klier (GDR)	Tatyana Anisimova (URS)	Gudrun Berend (GDR)
1982 Athens	Lucyna Kałek (POL)	Yordanka Donkova (BUL)	Kerstin Knabe (GDR)
1986 Stuttgart	Yordanka Donkova (BUL)	Cornelia Oschkenat (GDR)	Ginka Zagorcheva (BUL)
1990 Split	Monique Éwanjé-Épée (FRA)	Gloria Siebert (GDR)	Lidiya Yurkova (URS)
1994 Helsinki	Svetla Dimitrova (BUL)	Yuliya Graudyn (RUS)	Yordanka Donkova (BUL)
1998 Budapest	Svetla Dimitrova (BUL)	Brigita Bukovec (SLO)	Irina Korotya (RUS)
2002 Munich	Glory Alozie (ESP)	Olena Krasovska (UKR)	Yana Kasova (BUL)
2006 Gothenburg	Susanna Kallur (SWE)	Kirsten Bolm (GER) Derval O'Rourke (IRL)	Not awarded
2010 Barcelona	Nevin Yanıt (TUR)	Derval O'Rourke (IRL)	Carolin Nytra (GER)
2012 Helsinki	Alina Talay (BLR)	Katsiaryna Paplauskaya (BLR)	Beate Schrott (AUT)
2014 Zürich	Tiffany Porter (GBR)	Cindy Billaud (FRA)	Cindy Roleder (GER)
2016 Amsterdam	Cindy Roleder (GER)	Alina Talay (BLR)	Tiffany Porter (GBR)
2018 Berlin	Elvira Herman (BLR)	Pamela Dutkiewicz (GER)	Cindy Roleder (GER)
2022 Munich	Pia Skrzyszowska (POL)	Luca Kozák (HUN)	Ditaji Kambundji (SUI)
2024 Rome	Cyréna Samba-Mayela (FRA)	Ditaji Kambundji (SUI)	Pia Skrzyszowska (POL)
2026 Birmingham	Nadine Visser (NED)	Pia Skrzyszowska (POL)	Laëticia Bapté (FRA)

=== 400 metres hurdles ===
Games	Gold	Silver	Bronze
1978 Prague	Tatyana Zelentsova (URS)	Silvia Hollmann (FRG)	Karin Rossley (GDR)
1982 Athens	Ann-Louise Skoglund (SWE)	Petra Pfaff (GDR)	Chantal Réga (FRA)
1986 Stuttgart	Marina Stepanova (URS)	Sabine Busch (GDR)	Cornelia Feuerbach (GDR)
1990 Split	Tatyana Ledovskaya (URS)	Anita Protti (SUI)	Monica Westén (SWE)
1994 Helsinki	Sally Gunnell (GBR)	Silvia Rieger (GER)	Anna Knoroz (RUS)
1998 Budapest	Ionela Târlea (ROU)	Tetyana Tereshchuk (UKR)	Silvia Rieger (GER)
2002 Munich	Ionela Târlea (ROU)	Heike Meißner (GER)	Anna Olichwierczuk (POL)
2006 Gothenburg	Yevgeniya Isakova (RUS)	Fani Chalkia (GRE)	Tetyana Tereshchuk-Antipova (UKR)
2010 Barcelona	Natalya Antyukh (RUS)	Vania Stambolova (BUL)	Perri Shakes-Drayton (GBR)
2012 Helsinki	Denisa Rosolová (CZE)	Anna Yaroshchuk (UKR)	Zuzana Hejnová (CZE)
2014 Zürich	Eilidh Child (GBR)	Hanna Titimets (UKR)	Denisa Rosolová (CZE)
2016 Amsterdam	Sara Petersen (DEN)	Joanna Linkiewicz (POL)	Léa Sprunger (SUI)
2018 Berlin	Léa Sprunger (SUI)	Anna Ryzhykova (UKR)	Meghan Beesley (GBR)
2022 Munich	Femke Bol (NED)	Viktoriya Tkachuk (UKR)	Anna Ryzhykova (UKR)
2024 Rome	Femke Bol (NED)	Louise Maraval (FRA)	Cathelijn Peeters (NED)
2026 Birmingham	Emma Zapletalová (SVK)	Emily Newnham (GBR)	Fatoumata Binta Diallo (POR)

=== 3000 metres steeplechase ===
Games	Gold	Silver	Bronze
2006 Gothenburg	Alesia Turava (BLR)	Tatyana Petrova (RUS)	Wioletta Janowska (POL)
2010 Barcelona	Yuliya Zarudneva (RUS)	Hatti Dean (GBR)	Wioletta Frankiewicz (POL)
2012 Helsinki	Gülcan Mıngır (TUR)	Antje Möldner-Schmidt (GER)	Gesa Felicitas Krause (GER)
2014 Zürich	Antje Möldner-Schmidt (GER)	Charlotta Fougberg (SWE)	Diana Martín (ESP)
2016 Amsterdam	Gesa Felicitas Krause (GER)	Luiza Gega (ALB)	Ozlem Kaya (TUR)
2018 Berlin	Gesa Felicitas Krause (GER)	Fabienne Schlumpf (SUI)	Karoline Bjerkeli Grøvdal (NOR)
2022 Munich	Luiza Gega (ALB)	Lea Meyer (GER)	Elizabeth Bird (GBR)
2024 Rome	Alice Finot (FRA)	Gesa Felicitas Krause (GER)	Elizabeth Bird (GBR)
2026 Birmingham	Gesa Felicitas Krause (GER)	Alice Finot (FRA)	Olivia Gürth (GER)

=== 10 kilometres walk (discontinued event) ===
Games	Gold	Silver	Bronze
1986 Stuttgart	Mari Cruz Díaz (ESP)	Ann Jansson (SWE)	Siw Vera Ibáñez (SWE)
1990 Split	Annarita Sidoti (ITA)	Olga Kardopoltseva (URS)	Ileana Salvador (ITA)
1994 Helsinki	Sari Essayah (FIN)	Annarita Sidoti (ITA)	Yelena Nikolayeva (RUS)
1998 Budapest	Annarita Sidoti (ITA)	Erica Alfridi (ITA)	Susana Feitor (POR)

=== 20 kilometres walk ===
Games	Gold	Silver	Bronze
2002 Munich	Olimpiada Ivanova (RUS)	Yelena Nikolayeva (RUS)	Erica Alfridi (ITA)
2006 Gothenburg	Ryta Turava (BLR)	Olga Kaniskina (RUS)	Elisa Rigaudo (ITA)
2010 Barcelona	Anisya Kirdyapkina (RUS)	Vera Sokolova (RUS)	Melanie Seeger (GER)
2012 Helsinki	Not included in the program		
2014 Zürich	Elmira Alembekova (RUS)	Lyudmyla Olyanovska (UKR)	Anežka Drahotová (CZE)
2016 Amsterdam	Not included in the program		
2018 Berlin	Maria Perez (ESP)	Anežka Drahotová (CZE)	Antonella Palmisano (ITA)
2022 Munich	Antigoni Drisbioti (GRE)	Katarzyna Zdziebło (POL)	Saskia Feige (GER)
2024 Rome	Antonella Palmisano (ITA)	Valentina Trapletti (ITA)	Lyudmyla Olyanovska (UKR)

=== 35 kilometres walk ===
Games	Gold	Silver	Bronze
2022 Munich	Antigoni Drisbioti (GRE)	Raquel González (ESP)	Viktória Madarász (HUN)
2024 Rome	Not included in the program		

=== 50 kilometres walk (discontinued event) ===
Games	Gold	Silver	Bronze
2018 Berlin	Inês Henriques (POR)	Júlia Takács (ESP)	Khrystyna Yudkina (UKR)

=== 4 × 100 metres relay ===
Games	Gold	Silver	Bronze
1938 Vienna	Germany; Josefine Kohl; Käthe Krauss; Emmy Albus; Ida Kühnel	Poland; Jadwiga Gawrońska; Barbara Książkiewicz; Otylia Kałuża; Stanisława Walasiewicz	Italy; Maria Alfero; Maria Apollonio; Rosetta Cattaneo; Italia Lucchini
1946 Oslo	Netherlands; Gerda Koudijs; Netti Timmer; Martha Adema; Fanny Blankers-Koen	France; Léa Caurla; Anne-Marie Colchen; Claire Bresolles; Monique Drilhon	Soviet Union; Yevgeniya Sechenova; Valentina Fokina; Elene Gok'ieli; Valentina Vasilyeva
1950 Brussels	(United Kingdom) Great Britain & N.I. Elspeth Hay; Jean Desforges; Dorothy Hall; June Foulds	Netherlands; Xenia Stad-de Jong; Bertha Brouwer; Grietje de Jongh; Fanny Blankers-Koen	Soviet Union; Elene Gok'ieli; Sofya Malshina; Zoya Dukhovich; Yevgeniya Sechenova
1954 Bern	Soviet Union; Vera Krepkina; Rimma Ulitkina; Maria Itkina; Irina Turova	West Germany; Irmgard Egert; Charlotte Böhmer; Irene Brütting; Maria Sander	Italy; Maria Musso; Giuseppina Leone; Letizia Bertoni; Milena Greppi
1958 Stockholm	Soviet Union; Vera Krepkina; Linda Kepp; Nonna Polyakova; Valentyna Maslovska	(United Kingdom) Great Britain & N.I. Madeleine Weston; Dorothy Hyman; Claire Dew; Carole Quinton	Poland; Maria Chojnacka; Barbara Janiszewska; Celina Jesionowska; Maria Bibro
1962 Belgrade	Poland; Teresa Ciepły; Barbara Sobotta; Elżbieta Szyroka; Maria Piątkowska	West Germany; Erika Fisch; Martha Pensberger; Maren Collin; Jutta Heine; Renate Bronnsack	(United Kingdom) Great Britain & N.I. Ann Packer; Dorothy Hyman; Daphne Arden; Mary Rand
1966 Budapest	Poland; Elżbieta Bednarek; Danuta Straszyńska; Irena Kirszenstein; Ewa Kłobukowska	West Germany; Renate Meyer; Hannelore Trabert; Karin Frisch; Jutta Stöck	Soviet Union; Vera Popkova; Valentyna Bolshova; Lyudmila Samotyosova; Renāte Lāce
1969 Athens	East Germany; Regina Höfer; Renate Meissner; Bärbel Podeswa; Petra Vogt	West Germany; Bärbel Hähnle; Jutta Stöck; Rita Jahn; Ingrid Becker	(United Kingdom) Great Britain & N.I. Anita Neil; Denise Ramsden; Sheila Cooper; Val Peat
1971 Helsinki	West Germany; Elfgard Schittenhelm; Inge Helten; Annegret Irrgang; Ingrid Mickler-Becker	East Germany; Karin Balzer; Renate Stecher; Petra Vogt; Ellen Stropahl	Soviet Union; Lyudmila Zharkova; Galina Bukharina; Marina Sidorova; Nadezhda Besfamilnaya
1974 Rome	East Germany; Doris Maletzki; Renate Stecher; Christina Heinich; Bärbel Eckert	West Germany; Elfgard Schittenhelm; Annegret Kroniger; Annegret Richter; Inge Helten	Poland; Ewa Długołęcka; Danuta Jędrejek; Barbara Bakulin; Irena Szewińska
1978 Prague	Soviet Union; Vera Anisimova; Lyudmila Maslakova; Lyudmila Kondratyeva; Lyudmila Storozhkova	(United Kingdom) Great Britain & N.I. Beverley Goddard; Kathy Smallwood; Sharon Colyear; Sonia Lannaman	East Germany; Johanna Klier; Monika Hamann; Carla Bodendorf; Marlies Göhr
1982 Athens	East Germany; Gesine Walther; Bärbel Wöckel; Sabine Rieger; Marlies Göhr	(United Kingdom) Great Britain & N.I. Wendy Hoyte; Kathy Smallwood; Beverley Callender; Shirley Thomas	France; Laurence Bily; Marie-Christine Cazier; Rose-Aimée Bacoul; Liliane Gaschet
1986 Stuttgart	East Germany; Silke Gladisch; Sabine Günther-Rieger; Ingrid Auerswald; Marlies Göhr	Bulgaria; Ginka Zagorcheva; Anelia Nuneva; Nadezhda Georgieva; Yordanka Donkova	Soviet Union; Antonina Nastoburko; Natalya Bochina; Marina Zhirova; Olga Zolotaryova; Irina Slyusar
1990 Split	East Germany; Silke Möller; Katrin Krabbe; Kerstin Behrendt; Sabine Günther	West Germany; Gabriele Lippe; Ulrike Sarvari; Andrea Thomas; Silke Knoll	(United Kingdom) Great Britain & N.I. Stephanie Douglas; Beverly Kinch; Simmone Jacobs; Paula Thomas
1994 Helsinki	Germany; Melanie Paschke; Bettina Zipp; Silke Knoll; Silke Lichtenhagen	Russia; Natalya Anisimova; Galina Malchugina; Marina Trandenkova; Irina Privalova; Yekaterina Leshcheva	Bulgaria; Desislava Dimitrova; Anelia Nuneva; Svetla Dimitrova; Petya Pendareva
1998 Budapest	France; Katia Benth; Frédérique Bangué; Sylviane Félix; Christine Arron	Germany; Melanie Paschke; Gabi Rockmeier; Birgit Rockmeier; Andrea Philipp	Russia; Oksana Ekk; Galina Malchugina; Natalya Voronova; Irina Privalova
2002 Munich	France; Delphine Combe; Muriel Hurtis; Sylviane Félix; Odiah Sidibé	Germany; Melanie Paschke; Gabi Rockmeier; Sina Schielke; Marion Wagner	Russia; Natalya Ignatova; Yuliya Tabakova; Irina Khabarova; Larisa Kruglova
2006 Gothenburg	Russia; Yuliya Gushchina; Natalia Rusakova; Irina Khabarova; Yekaterina Grigoryeva; Yekaterina Kondratyeva; Larisa Kruglova	(United Kingdom) Great Britain & N.I. Anyika Onuora; Emma Ania; Emily Freeman; Joice Maduaka; Laura Turner	Belarus; Yulia Nestsiarenka; Natallia Safronnikava; Alena Newmyarzhytskaya; Aksana Drahun
2010 Barcelona	Ukraine; Olesya Povh; Nataliya Pohrebnyak; Mariya Ryemyen; Yelyzaveta Bryzhina; Elena Chebanu	France; Myriam Soumaré; Véronique Mang; Lina Jacques-Sébastien; Christine Arron; Céline Distel; Nelly Banco	Poland; Marika Popowicz; Daria Korczyńska; Marta Jeschke; Weronika Wedler
2012 Helsinki	Germany; Leena Günther; Anne Cibis; Tatjana Lofamakanda Pinto; Verena Sailer	Netherlands; Kadene Vassell; Dafne Schippers; Eva Lubbers; Jamile Samuel; Esther Akihary; Marit Dopheide	Poland; Marika Popowicz; Daria Korczyńska; Marta Jeschke; Ewelina Ptak
2014 Zürich	(United Kingdom) Great Britain & N.I. Asha Philip; Ashleigh Nelson; Jodie Williams; Desirèe Henry; Anyika Onuora	France; Céline Distel-Bonnet; Ayodelé Ikuesan; Myriam Soumaré; Stella Akakpo	Russia; Marina Panteleyeva; Natalia Rusakova; Yelizaveta Savlinis; Kristina Sivkova; Yekaterina Vukolova
2016 Amsterdam	Netherlands; Jamile Samuel; Dafne Schippers; Tessa van Schagen; Naomi Sedney; Marije van Hunenstijn	(United Kingdom) Great Britain & N.I. Asha Philip; Dina Asher-Smith; Bianca Williams; Daryll Neita	Germany; Tatjana Pinto; Lisa Mayer; Gina Lückenkemper; Rebekka Haase
2018 Berlin	(United Kingdom) Great Britain & N.I. Asha Philip; Imani-Lara Lansiquot; Bianca Williams; Dina Asher-Smith; Daryll Neita	Netherlands; Dafne Schippers; Marije van Hunenstijn; Jamile Samuel; Naomi Sedney	Germany; Lisa-Marie Kwayie; Gina Lückenkemper; Tatjana Pinto; Rebekka Haase
2022 Munich	Germany; Alexandra Burghardt; Lisa Mayer; Gina Lückenkemper; Rebekka Haase; Jessica-Bianca Wessolly	Poland; Pia Skrzyszowska; Anna Kiełbasińska; Marika Popowicz-Drapała; Ewa Swoboda; Magdalena Stefanowicz; Martyna Kotwiła	Italy; Zaynab Dosso; Dalia Kaddari; Anna Bongiorni; Alessia Pavese; Gloria Hooper
2024 Rome	(United Kingdom) Great Britain & N.I. Dina Asher-Smith; Desirèe Henry; Amy Hunt; Daryll Neita; Asha Philip	France; Orlann Oliere; Gémima Joseph; Hélène Parisot; Sarah Richard; Maroussia Paré	Netherlands; Nadine Visser; Marije van Hunenstijn; Minke Bisschops; Tasa Jiya
2026 Birmingham	(United Kingdom) Great Britain & N.I. Dina Asher-Smith; Amy Hunt; Success Eduan; Imani Lansiquot; Kristal Awuah	Switzerland; Géraldine Di Tizio-Frey; Fabienne Hoenke; Léonie Pointet; Salomé Kora; Ajla Del Ponte	Poland; Krystsina Tsimanouskaya; Pia Skrzyszowska; Magdalena Stefanowicz; Ewa Swoboda; Wiktoria Gajosz

=== 4 × 400 metres relay ===
Games	Gold	Silver	Bronze
1969 Athens	(United Kingdom) Great Britain & N.I. Rosemary Stirling; Patricia Lowe; Janet Simpson; Lillian Board	France; Bernadette Martin; Nicole Duclos; Éliane Jacq; Colette Besson	West Germany; Christa Czekay; Antje Gleichfeld; Inge Eckhoff; Christel Frese
1971 Helsinki	East Germany; Rita Kühne; Ingelore Lohse; Helga Seidler; Monika Zehrt	West Germany; Anette Rückes; Christel Frese; Hildegard Falck; Inge Bödding	Soviet Union; Raisa Nikanorova; Vera Popkova; Nadezhda Kolesnikova; Natalya Chistyakova
1974 Rome	East Germany; Brigitte Rohde; Waltraud Dietsch; Angelika Handt; Ellen Streidt	Finland; Marika Eklund; Mona-Lisa Pursiainen; Pirjo Wilmi; Riitta Salin	Soviet Union; Inta Kļimoviča; Ingrīda Barkāne; Nadezhda Ilyina; Natalya Sokolova
1978 Prague	East Germany; Christiane Marquardt; Barbara Krug; Christina Brehmer; Marita Koch	Soviet Union; Tatyana Prorochenko; Nadezhda Mushta; Tatyana Providokhina; Mariya Kulchunova	Poland; Małgorzata Gajewska; Krystyna Kacperczyk; Genowefa Błaszak; Irena Szewińska
1982 Athens	East Germany; Kirsten Siemon; Sabine Busch; Dagmar Rübsam; Marita Koch	Czechoslovakia; Věra Tylová; Milena Matejkovicová; Taťána Kocembová; Jarmila Kratochvílová	Soviet Union; Yelena Korban; Irina Olkhovnikova; Olga Mineyeva; Irina Baskakova
1986 Stuttgart	East Germany; Kirsten Emmelmann; Sabine Busch; Petra Müller; Marita Koch	West Germany; Gisela Kinzel; Ute Thimm; Heidi-Elke Gaugel; Gaby Bußmann	Poland; Ewa Kasprzyk; Marzena Wojdecka; Elżbieta Kapusta; Genowefa Błaszak
1990 Split	East Germany; Manuela Derr; Annett Hesselbarth; Petra Schersing; Grit Breuer	Soviet Union; Yelena Vinogradova; Lyudmyla Dzhyhalova; Yelena Ruzina; Tatyana Ledovskaya; Marina Shmonina	(United Kingdom) Great Britain & N.I. Sally Gunnell; Jennifer Stoute; Pat Beckford; Linda Keough; Angela Piggford
1994 Helsinki	France; Francine Landre; Viviane Dorsile; Evelyne Elien; Marie-José Pérec; Marie-Line Scholent	Russia; Natalya Khrushchelyova; Yelena Andreyeva; Tatyana Zakharova; Svetlana Goncharenko; Yelena Golesheva	Germany; Karin Janke; Uta Rohländer; Heike Meißner; Anja Rücker; Linda Kisabaka
1998 Budapest	Germany; Anke Feller; Uta Rohländer; Silvia Rieger; Grit Breuer; Anja Knippel; Martina Breu	Russia; Natalya Khrushchelyova; Svetlana Goncharenko; Yekaterina Bakhvalova; Olga Kotlyarova; Yekaterina Kulikova	(United Kingdom) Great Britain & N.I. Donna Fraser; Vicki Jamison; Katharine Merry; Allison Curbishley; Melanie Thomas; Tasha Danvers
2002 Munich	Germany; Florence Ekpo-Umoh; Birgit Rockmeier; Claudia Marx; Grit Breuer; Nancy Kette	Russia; Natalya Antyukh; Natalya Nazarova; Anastasiya Kapachinskaya; Olesya Zykina; Yekaterina Bakhvalova; Tatyana Levina	Poland; Zuzanna Radecka; Grażyna Prokopek; Małgorzata Pskit; Anna Olichwierczuk; Justyna Karolkiewicz
2006 Gothenburg	Russia; Svetlana Pospelova; Natalya Ivanova; Olga Zaytseva; Tatyana Veshkurova; Yelena Migunova; Tatyana Firova	Belarus; Yulyana Zhalniaruk; Sviatlana Usovich; Anna Kozak; Ilona Usovich; Ekaterina Bobrik; Iryna Khliustava	Poland; Monika Bejnar; Grażyna Prokopek; Ewelina Sętowska; Anna Jesień; Marta Chrust-Rożej
2010 Barcelona	Germany; Fabienne Kohlmann; Esther Cremer; Janin Lindenberg; Claudia Hoffmann; Jill Richards	(United Kingdom) Great Britain & N.I. Nicola Sanders; Marilyn Okoro; Lee McConnell; Perri Shakes-Drayton; Vicki Barr	Italy; Chiara Bazzoni; Marta Milani; Maria Enrica Spacca; Libania Grenot
2012 Helsinki	Ukraine; Yuliya Olishevska; Olha Zemlyak; Nataliya Pyhyda; Alina Lohvynenko; Daryna Prystupa	France; Phara Anacharsis; Lénora Guion-Firmin; Marie Gayot; Floria Gueï; Elea-Mariama Diarra	Czech Republic; Zuzana Hejnová; Zuzana Bergrová; Jitka Bartoničková; Denisa Rosolová
2014 Zürich	France; Marie Gayot; Muriel Hurtis; Agnès Raharolahy; Floria Gueï; Estelle Perrossier; Phara Anacharsis	Ukraine; Nataliya Pyhyda; Khrystyna Stuy; Anna Ryzhykova; Olha Zemlyak; Daryna Prystupa; Olha Lyakhova	(United Kingdom) Great Britain & N.I. Eilidh Child; Kelly Massey; Shana Cox; Margaret Adeoye; Emily Diamond; Victoria Ohuruogu
2016 Amsterdam	(United Kingdom) Great Britain & N.I. Emily Diamond; Anyika Onuora; Eilidh Doyle; Seren Bundy-Davies; Margaret Adeoye; Kelly Massey	France; Phara Anacharsis; Brigitte Ntiamoah; Marie Gayot; Floria Gueï; Agnès Raharolahy; Elea-Mariama Diarra	Italy; Maria Benedicta Chigbolu; Maria Enrica Spacca; Chiara Bazzoni; Libania Grenot; Elena Maria Bonfanti
2018 Berlin	Poland; Małgorzata Hołub-Kowalik; Iga Baumgart-Witan; Patrycja Wyciszkiewicz; Justyna Święty-Ersetic; Natalia Kaczmarek; Martyna Dąbrowska	France; Elea-Mariama Diarra; Déborah Sananes; Agnès Raharolahy; Floria Gueï; Estelle Perrossier	(United Kingdom) Great Britain & N.I. Zoey Clark; Anyika Onuora; Amy Allcock; Eilidh Doyle; Finette Agyapong; Mary Abichi; Emily Diamond
2022 Munich	Netherlands; Eveline Saalberg; Lieke Klaver; Lisanne de Witte; Femke Bol; Andrea Bouma; Laura de Witte	Poland; Anna Kiełbasińska; Iga Baumgart-Witan; Justyna Święty-Ersetic; Natalia Kaczmarek; Kinga Gacka; Małgorzata Hołub-Kowalik	(United Kingdom) Great Britain & N.I. Victoria Ohuruogu; Ama Pipi; Jodie Williams; Nicole Yeargin; Zoey Clark; Laviai Nielsen
2024 Rome	Netherlands; Lieke Klaver; Cathelijn Peeters; Lisanne de Witte; Femke Bol; Eveline Saalberg; Anne van de Wiel; Myrte van der Schoot	Ireland; Sophie Becker; Rhasidat Adeleke; Phil Healy; Sharlene Mawdsley; Lauren Cadden	Belgium; Naomi Van den Broeck; Imke Vervaet; Cynthia Bolingo; Helena Ponette; Camille Laus
2026 Birmingham	Netherlands; Myrte van der Schoot; Lieke Klaver; Eveline Saalberg; Femke Broeders-Bol; Vanessa Mercera; Nina Franke	(United Kingdom) Great Britain & N.I. Yemi Mary John; Lina Nielsen; Nicole Yeargin; Emily Newnham; Charlotte Henrich	Italy; Alessandra Bonora; Anna Polinari; Alice Mangione; Eloisa Coiro; Ilaria Elvira Accame; Sara Cirillo

== Field ==
=== High jump ===
Games	Gold	Silver	Bronze
1938 Vienna	Ibolya Csák (HUN)	Nelly van Balen Blanken (NED)	Feodora zu Solms (GER)
1946 Oslo	Anne-Marie Colchen (FRA)	Aleksandra Chudina (URS)	Anne Iversen (DEN)
1950 Brussels	Sheila Alexander (GBR)	Dorothy Tyler (GBR)	Galina Ganeker (URS)
1954 Bern	Thelma Hopkins (GBR)	Iolanda Balaș (ROU)	Olga Modrachová (TCH)
1958 Stockholm	Iolanda Balaș (ROU)	Taisia Chenchik (URS)	Dorothy Shirley (GBR)
1962 Belgrade	Iolanda Balaș (ROU)	Olga Gere (YUG)	Linda Knowles (GBR)
1966 Budapest	Taisia Chenchik (URS)	Lyudmila Komleva (URS)	Jarosława Bieda (POL)
1969 Athens	Miloslava Rezková (TCH)	Antonina Lazareva (URS)	Mária Mračnová (TCH)
1971 Helsinki	Ilona Gusenbauer (AUT)	Barbara Inkpen (GBR) Cornelia Popescu (ROU)	Not awarded
1974 Rome	Rosemarie Witschas (GDR)	Milada Karbanová (TCH)	Sara Simeoni (ITA)
1978 Prague	Sara Simeoni (ITA)	Rosemarie Ackermann (GDR)	Brigitte Holzapfel (FRG)
1982 Athens	Ulrike Meyfarth (FRG)	Tamara Bykova (URS)	Sara Simeoni (ITA)
1986 Stuttgart	Stefka Kostadinova (BUL)	Svetlana Isaeva (BUL)	Olga Turchak (URS)
1990 Split	Heike Henkel (FRG)	Biljana Petrović (YUG)	Yelena Yelesina (URS)
1994 Helsinki	Britta Bilač (SLO)	Yelena Gulyayeva (RUS)	Nelė Žilinskienė (LTU)
1998 Budapest	Monica Dinescu (ROU)	Donata Jancewicz (POL)	Alina Astafei (GER)
2002 Munich	Kajsa Bergqvist (SWE)	Marina Kuptsova (RUS)	Olga Kaliturina (RUS)
2006 Gothenburg	Tia Hellebaut (BEL)	Venelina Veneva (BUL)	Kajsa Bergqvist (SWE)
2010 Barcelona	Blanka Vlašić (CRO)	Emma Green (SWE)	Ariane Friedrich (GER)
2012 Helsinki	Ruth Beitia (ESP)	Tonje Angelsen (NOR)	Irina Gordeeva (RUS) Emma Green Tregaro (SWE) Olena Holosha (UKR)
2014 Zürich	Ruth Beitia (ESP)	Mariya Kuchina (RUS)	Ana Šimić (CRO)
2016 Amsterdam	Ruth Beitia (ESP)	Mirela Demireva (BUL) Airinė Palšytė (LTU)	Not awarded
2018 Berlin	Mariya Lasitskene (ANA)	Mirela Demireva (BUL)	Marie-Laurence Jungfleisch (GER)
2022 Munich	Yaroslava Mahuchikh (UKR)	Marija Vuković (MNE)	Angelina Topić (SRB)
2024 Rome	Yaroslava Mahuchikh (UKR)	Angelina Topić (SRB)	Iryna Herashchenko (UKR)
2026 Birmingham	Yaroslava Mahuchikh (UKR)	Maria Żodzik (POL)	Marija Vuković (MNE)

=== Pole vault ===
Games	Gold	Silver	Bronze
1998 Budapest	Anzhela Balakhonova (UKR)	Nicole Rieger-Humbert (GER)	Yvonne Buschbaum (GER)
2002 Munich	Svetlana Feofanova (RUS)	Yelena Isinbayeva (RUS)	Yvonne Buschbaum (GER)
2006 Gothenburg	Yelena Isinbayeva (RUS)	Monika Pyrek (POL)	Tatyana Polnova (RUS)
2010 Barcelona	Svetlana Feofanova (RUS)	Silke Spiegelburg (GER)	Lisa Ryzih (GER)
2012 Helsinki	Jiřina Ptáčníková (CZE)	Martina Strutz (GER)	Nikoleta Kyriakopoulou (GRE)
2014 Zürich	Anzhelika Sidorova (RUS)	Katerina Stefanidi (GRE)	Angelina Zhuk-Krasnova (RUS)
2016 Amsterdam	Katerina Stefanidi (GRE)	Lisa Ryzih (GER)	Angelica Bengtsson (SWE)
2018 Berlin	Katerina Stefanidi (GRE)	Nikoleta Kyriakopoulou (GRE)	Holly Bradshaw (GBR)
2022 Munich	Wilma Murto (FIN)	Katerina Stefanidi (GRE)	Tina Šutej (SLO)
2024 Rome	Angelica Moser (SUI)	Katerina Stefanidi (GRE)	Molly Caudery (GBR)
2026 Birmingham	Angelica Moser (SUI)	Wilma Heltelä (FIN)	Marie-Julie Bonnin (FRA)

=== Long jump ===
Games	Gold	Silver	Bronze
1938 Vienna	Irmgard Praetz (GER)	Stanisława Walasiewicz (POL)	Gisela Voß (GER)
1946 Oslo	Gerda Koudijs (NED)	Lidija Gaile (URS)	Valentina Vasilyeva (URS)
1950 Brussels	Valentina Bogdanova (URS)	Wilhelmina Lust (NED)	Maire Österdahl (FIN)
1954 Bern	Jean Desforges (GBR)	Aleksandra Chudina (URS)	Elżbieta Duńska (POL)
1958 Stockholm	Liesel Jakobi (FRG)	Valentina Lituyeva (URS)	Nina Protchenko (URS)
1962 Belgrade	Tatyana Shchelkanova (URS)	Elżbieta Krzesińska (POL)	Mary Rand (GBR)
1966 Budapest	Irena Kirszenstein (POL)	Diana Yorgova (BUL)	Helga Hoffmann (FRG)
1969 Athens	Mirosława Sarna (POL)	Viorica Viscopoleanu (ROU)	Berit Berthelsen (NOR)
1971 Helsinki	Ingrid Mickler-Becker (FRG)	Meta Antenen (SUI)	Heide Rosendahl (FRG)
1974 Rome	Ilona Bruzsenyák (HUN)	Eva Šuranová (TCH)	Pirkko Helenius (FIN)
1978 Prague	Vilma Bardauskienė (URS)	Angela Voigt (GDR)	Jarmila Nygrýnová (TCH)
1982 Athens	Vali Ionescu (ROU)	Anișoara Cușmir (ROU)	Yelena Ivanova (URS)
1986 Stuttgart	Heike Drechsler (GDR)	Galina Chistyakova (URS)	Helga Radtke (GDR)
1990 Split	Heike Drechsler (GDR)	Marieta Ilcu (ROU)	Helga Radtke (GDR)
1994 Helsinki	Heike Drechsler (GER)	Inessa Kravets (UKR)	Fiona May (ITA)
1998 Budapest	Heike Drechsler (GER)	Fiona May (ITA)	Lyudmila Galkina (RUS)
2002 Munich	Tatyana Kotova (RUS)	Jade Johnson (GBR)	Tünde Vaszi (HUN)
2006 Gothenburg	Lyudmila Kolchanova (RUS)	Naide Gomes (POR)	Oksana Udmurtova (RUS)
2010 Barcelona	Ineta Radēviča (LAT)	Naide Gomes (POR)	Olga Kucherenko (RUS)
2012 Helsinki	Éloyse Lesueur (FRA)	Volha Sudarava (BLR)	Margrethe Renstrøm (NOR)
2014 Zürich	Éloyse Lesueur (FRA)	Ivana Španović (SRB)	Darya Klishina (RUS)
2016 Amsterdam	Ivana Španović (SRB)	Jazmin Sawyers (GBR)	Malaika Mihambo (GER)
2018 Berlin	Malaika Mihambo (GER)	Maryna Bekh (UKR)	Shara Proctor (GBR)
2022 Munich	Ivana Vuleta (SRB)	Malaika Mihambo (GER)	Jazmin Sawyers (GBR)
2024 Rome	Malaika Mihambo (GER)	Larissa Iapichino (ITA)	Agate de Sousa (POR)
2026 Birmingham	Larissa Iapichino (ITA)	Jazmin Sawyers (GBR)	Hilary Kpatcha (FRA)

=== Triple jump ===
Games	Gold	Silver	Bronze
1994 Helsinki	Anna Biryukova (RUS)	Inna Lasovskaya (RUS)	Inessa Kravets (UKR)
1998 Budapest	Olga Vasdeki (GRE)	Šárka Kašpárková (CZE)	Tereza Marinova (BUL)
2002 Munich	Ashia Hansen (GBR)	Heli Koivula (FIN)	Yelena Oleynikova (RUS)
2006 Gothenburg	Tatyana Lebedeva (RUS)	Hrysopiyi Devetzi (GRE)	Anna Pyatykh (RUS)
2010 Barcelona	Olha Saladukha (UKR)	Simona La Mantia (ITA)	Svetlana Bolshakova (BEL)
2012 Helsinki	Olha Saladukha (UKR)	Patrícia Mamona (POR)	Yana Borodina (RUS)
2014 Zürich	Olha Saladukha (UKR)	Ekaterina Koneva (RUS)	Irina Gumenyuk (RUS)
2016 Amsterdam	Patrícia Mamona (POR)	Hanna Minenko (ISR)	Paraskevi Papachristou (GRE)
2018 Berlin	Paraskevi Papachristou (GRE)	Kristin Gierisch (GER)	Ana Peleteiro (ESP)
2022 Munich	Maryna Bekh-Romanchuk (UKR)	Kristiina Mäkelä (FIN)	Hanna Minenko (ISR)
2024 Rome	Ana Peleteiro-Compaoré (ESP)	Tuğba Danışmaz (TUR)	Ilionis Guillaume (FRA)
2026 Birmingham	Dariya Derkach (ITA)	Saliyya Guisse (BEL)	Aleksandra Nacheva (BUL)

=== Shot put ===
Games	Gold	Silver	Bronze
1938 Vienna	Hermine Schröder (GER)	Gisela Mauermayer (GER)	Wanda Flakowicz (POL)
1946 Oslo	Tatyana Sevryukova (URS)	Micheline Ostermeyer (FRA)	Amelia Piccinini (ITA)
1950 Brussels	Anna Andreyeva (URS)	Klavdiya Tochonova (URS)	Micheline Ostermeyer (FRA)
1954 Bern	Galina Zybina (URS)	Mariya Kuznetsova (URS)	Tamara Tyshkevich (URS)
1958 Stockholm	Marianne Werner (FRG)	Tamara Tyshkevich (URS)	Tamara Press (URS)
1962 Belgrade	Tamara Press (URS)	Renate Garisch (GDR)	Galina Zybina (URS)
1966 Budapest	Nadezhda Chizhova (URS)	Margitta Gummel (GDR)	Marita Lange (GDR)
1969 Athens	Nadezhda Chizhova (URS)	Margitta Gummel (GDR)	Marita Lange (GDR)
1971 Helsinki	Nadezhda Chizhova (URS)	Marita Lange (GDR)	Margitta Gummel (GDR)
1974 Rome	Nadezhda Chizhova (URS)	Marianne Adam (GDR)	Helena Fibingerová (TCH)
1978 Prague	Ilona Slupianek (GDR)	Helena Fibingerová (TCH)	Margitta Droese (GDR)
1982 Athens	Ilona Slupianek (GDR)	Helena Fibingerová (TCH)	Nunu Abashydze (URS)
1986 Stuttgart	Heidi Krieger (GDR)	Ines Müller (GDR)	Natalya Akhrimenko (URS)
1990 Split	Astrid Kumbernuss (GDR)	Natalya Lisovskaya (URS)	Kathrin Neimke (GDR)
1994 Helsinki	Vita Pavlysh (UKR)	Astrid Kumbernuss (GER)	Svetla Mitkova (BUL)
1998 Budapest	Vita Pavlysh (UKR)	Irina Korzhanenko (RUS)	Yanina Karolchyk (BLR)
2002 Munich	Irina Korzhanenko (RUS)	Vita Pavlysh (UKR)	Svetlana Krivelyova (RUS)
2006 Gothenburg	Natallia Kharaneka (BLR)	Petra Lammert (GER)	Olga Ryabinkina (RUS)
2010 Barcelona	Anna Avdeyeva (RUS)	Yanina Karolchyk-Pravalinskaya (BLR)	Olga Ivanova (RUS)
2012 Helsinki	Nadine Kleinert (GER)	Irina Tarasova (RUS)	Chiara Rosa (ITA)
2014 Zürich	Christina Schwanitz (GER)	Anita Márton (HUN)	Yuliya Leantsiuk (BLR)
2016 Amsterdam	Christina Schwanitz (GER)	Anita Márton (HUN)	Emel Dereli (TUR)
2018 Berlin	Paulina Guba (POL)	Christina Schwanitz (GER)	Aliona Dubitskaya (BLR)
2022 Munich	Jessica Schilder (NED)	Auriol Dongmo (POR)	Jorinde van Klinken (NED)
2024 Rome	Jessica Schilder (NED)	Jorinde van Klinken (NED)	Yemisi Ogunleye (GER)
2026 Birmingham	Jessica Schilder (NED)	Jorinde van Klinken (NED)	Yemisi Mabry (GER)

=== Discus throw ===
Games	Gold	Silver	Bronze
1938 Vienna	Gisela Mauermayer (GER)	Hilde Sommer (GER)	Paula Mollenhauer (GER)
1946 Oslo	Nina Dumbadze (URS)	Ans Niesink (NED)	Jadwiga Wajs (POL)
1950 Brussels	Nina Dumbadze (URS)	Rimma Shumskaya (URS)	Edera Cordiale (ITA)
1954 Bern	Nina Ponomaryova (URS)	Irina Beglyakova (URS)	Galina Zybina (URS)
1958 Stockholm	Tamara Press (URS)	Štěpánka Mertová (TCH)	Kriemhild Hausmann (FRG)
1962 Belgrade	Tamara Press (URS)	Doris Müller (GDR)	Jolán Kontsek (HUN)
1966 Budapest	Christine Spielberg (GDR)	Liesel Westermann (FRG)	Anita Hentschel (GDR)
1969 Athens	Tamara Danilova (URS)	Lyudmila Muravyova (URS)	Karin Illgen (GDR)
1971 Helsinki	Faina Melnik (URS)	Liesel Westermann (FRG)	Lyudmila Muravyova (URS)
1974 Rome	Faina Melnik (URS)	Argentina Menis (ROU)	Gabriele Hinzmann (GDR)
1978 Prague	Evelin Jahl (GDR)	Margitta Droese (GDR)	Natalya Gorbachova (URS)
1982 Athens	Tsvetanka Khristova (BUL)	Mariya Petkova (BUL)	Galina Savinkova (URS)
1986 Stuttgart	Diana Sachse (GDR)	Tsvetanka Khristova (BUL)	Martina Hellmann (GDR)
1990 Split	Ilke Wyludda (GDR)	Olga Burova (URS)	Martina Hellmann (GDR)
1994 Helsinki	Ilke Wyludda (GER)	Ellina Zvereva (BLR)	Mette Bergmann (NOR)
1998 Budapest	Franka Dietzsch (GER)	Natalya Sadova (RUS)	Nicoleta Grasu (ROU)
2002 Munich	Ekaterini Voggoli (GRE)	Natalya Sadova (RUS)	Anastasia Kelesidou (GRE)
2006 Gothenburg	Darya Pishchalnikova (RUS)	Franka Dietzsch (GER)	Nicoleta Grasu (ROU)
2010 Barcelona	Sandra Perković (CRO)	Nicoleta Grasu (ROU)	Joanna Wiśniewska (POL)
2012 Helsinki	Sandra Perković (CRO)	Nadine Müller (GER)	Natalia Semenova (UKR)
2014 Zürich	Sandra Perković (CRO)	Mélina Robert-Michon (FRA)	Shanice Craft (GER)
2016 Amsterdam	Sandra Perković (CRO)	Julia Fischer (GER)	Shanice Craft (GER)
2018 Berlin	Sandra Perković (CRO)	Nadine Müller (GER)	Shanice Craft (GER)
2022 Munich	Sandra Perković (CRO)	Kristin Pudenz (GER)	Claudine Vita (GER)
2024 Rome	Sandra Elkasević (CRO)	Jorinde van Klinken (NED)	Liliana Cá (POR)
2026 Birmingham	Jorinde van Klinken (NED)	Shanice Craft (GER)	Vanessa Kamga (SWE)

=== Hammer throw ===
Games	Gold	Silver	Bronze
1998 Budapest	Mihaela Melinte (ROU)	Olga Kuzenkova (RUS)	Kirsten Münchow (GER)
2002 Munich	Olga Kuzenkova (RUS)	Kamila Skolimowska (POL)	Manuela Montebrun (FRA)
2006 Gothenburg	Tatyana Lysenko (RUS)	Gulfiya Khanafeyeva (RUS)	Kamila Skolimowska (POL)
2010 Barcelona	Betty Heidler (GER)	Tatyana Lysenko (RUS)	Anita Włodarczyk (POL)
2012 Helsinki	Anita Włodarczyk (POL)	Martina Hrašnová (SVK)	Anna Bulgakova (RUS)
2014 Zurich	Anita Włodarczyk (POL)	Martina Hrašnová (SVK)	Joanna Fiodorow (POL)
2016 Amsterdam	Anita Włodarczyk (POL)	Betty Heidler (GER)	Hanna Skydan (AZE)
2018 Berlin	Anita Włodarczyk (POL)	Alexandra Tavernier (FRA)	Joanna Fiodorow (POL)
2022 Munich	Bianca Ghelber (ROU)	Ewa Różańska (POL)	Sara Fantini (ITA)
2024 Rome	Sara Fantini (ITA)	Anita Włodarczyk (POL)	Rose Loga (FRA)
2026 Birmingham	Silja Kosonen (FIN)	Sara Fantini (ITA)	Beatrice Nedberge Llano (NOR)

=== Javelin throw ===
Games	Gold	Silver	Bronze
1938 Vienna	Lisa Gelius (GER)	Susi Pastoors (GER)	Luise Krüger (GER)
1946 Oslo	Klavdiya Mayuchaya (URS)	Lyudmila Anokina (URS)	Ans Koning (NED)
1950 Brussels	Natalya Smirnitskaya (URS)	Herma Bauma (AUT)	Galina Zybina (URS)
1954 Bern	Dana Zátopková (TCH)	Virve Roolaid (URS)	Nadezhda Konyayeva (URS)
1958 Stockholm	Dana Zátopková (TCH)	Birutė Zalogaitytė (URS)	Jutta Neumann (FRG)
1962 Belgrade	Elvīra Ozoliņa (URS)	Maria Diaconescu (ROU)	Alevtina Shastitko (URS)
1966 Budapest	Marion Lüttge (GDR)	Mihaela Peneș (ROU)	Valentina Popova (URS)
1969 Athens	Angéla Ránky (HUN)	Magda Vidos (HUN)	Valentyna Evert (URS)
1971 Helsinki	Daniela Jaworska (POL)	Ameli Koloska (FRG)	Ruth Fuchs (GDR)
1974 Rome	Ruth Fuchs (GDR)	Jacqueline Todten (GDR)	Nataša Urbančič (YUG)
1978 Prague	Ruth Fuchs (GDR)	Tessa Sanderson (GBR)	Ute Hommola (GDR)
1982 Athens	Anna Verouli (GRE)	Antje Kempe (GDR)	Sofia Sakorafa (GRE)
1986 Stuttgart	Fatima Whitbread (GBR)	Petra Felke (GDR)	Beate Peters (FRG)
1990 Split	Päivi Alafrantti (FIN)	Karen Forkel (GDR)	Petra Felke (GDR)
1994 Helsinki	Trine Hattestad (NOR)	Karen Forkel (GER)	Felicia Țilea (ROU)
1998 Budapest	Tanja Damaske (GER)	Tatyana Shikolenko (RUS)	Mikaela Ingberg (FIN)
2002 Munich	Mirela Maniani (GRE)	Steffi Nerius (GER)	Mikaela Ingberg (FIN)
2006 Gothenburg	Steffi Nerius (GER)	Barbora Špotáková (CZE)	Mercedes Chilla (ESP)
2010 Barcelona	Linda Stahl (GER)	Christina Obergföll (GER)	Barbora Špotáková (CZE)
2012 Helsinki	Vira Rebryk (UKR)	Christina Obergföll (GER)	Linda Stahl (GER)
2014 Zürich	Barbora Špotáková (CZE)	Tatjana Jelača (SRB)	Linda Stahl (GER)
2016 Amsterdam	Tatsiana Khaladovich (BLR)	Linda Stahl (GER)	Sara Kolak (CRO)
2018 Berlin	Christin Hussong (GER)	Nikola Ogrodníková (CZE)	Liveta Jasiūnaitė (LTU)
2022 Munich	Elina Tzengko (GRE)	Adriana Vilagoš (SRB)	Barbora Špotáková (CZE)
2024 Rome	Victoria Hudson (AUT)	Adriana Vilagoš (SRB)	Marie-Therese Obst (NOR)
2026 Birmingham	Sara Kolak (CRO)	Julia Ulbricht (GER)	Adriana Vilagoš (SRB)

== Combined ==
=== Pentathlon (discontinued event) ===
Games	Gold	Silver	Bronze
1950 Brussels	Arlette Ben Hamo (FRA)	Bertha Crowther (GBR)	Olga Modrachová (TCH)
1954 Bern	Aleksandra Chudina (URS)	Maria Sander (FRG)	Maria Sturm (FRG)
1958 Stockholm	Galina Bystrova (URS)	Nina Vinogradova (URS)	Edeltraud Eiberle (FRG)
1962 Belgrade	Galina Bystrova (URS)	Denise Guénard (FRA)	Helga Hoffmann (FRG)
1966 Budapest	Valentina Tikhomirova (URS)	Heide Rosendahl (FRG)	Inge Exner (GDR)
1969 Athens	Liese Prokop (AUT)	Meta Antenen (SUI)	Mariya Sizyakova (URS)
1971 Helsinki	Heide Rosendahl (FRG)	Burglinde Pollak (GDR)	Margrit Herbst (GDR)
1974 Rome	Nadiya Tkachenko (URS)	Burglinde Pollak (GDR)	Zoya Spasovkhodskaya (URS)
1978 Prague	Margit Papp (HUN)	Burglinde Pollak (GDR)	Kristine Nitzsche (GDR)

=== Heptathlon ===
Games	Gold	Silver	Bronze
1982 Athens	Ramona Neubert (GDR)	Sabine Möbius (GDR)	Sabine Everts (FRG)
1986 Stuttgart	Anke Behmer (GDR)	Natalya Shubenkova (URS)	Judy Simpson (GBR)
1990 Split	Sabine Braun (FRG)	Heike Tischler (GDR)	Peggy Beer (GDR)
1994 Helsinki	Sabine Braun (GER)	Rita Ináncsi (HUN)	Urszula Włodarczyk (POL)
1998 Budapest	Denise Lewis (GBR)	Urszula Włodarczyk (POL)	Natallia Sazanovich (BLR)
2002 Munich	Carolina Klüft (SWE)	Sabine Braun (GER)	Natallia Sazanovich (BLR)
2006 Gothenburg	Carolina Klüft (SWE)	Karin Ruckstuhl (NED)	Lilli Schwarzkopf (GER)
2010 Barcelona	Jessica Ennis (GBR)	Nataliya Dobrynska (UKR)	Jennifer Oeser (GER)
2012 Helsinki	Antoinette Nana Djimou (FRA)	Laura Ikauniece (LAT)	Aiga Grabuste (LAT)
2014 Zürich	Antoinette Nana Djimou (FRA)	Nadine Broersen (NED)	Nafissatou Thiam (BEL)
2016 Amsterdam	Anouk Vetter (NED)	Antoinette Nana Djimou (FRA)	Ivona Dadic (AUT)
2018 Berlin	Nafissatou Thiam (BEL)	Katarina Johnson-Thompson (GBR)	Carolin Schäfer (GER)
2022 Munich	Nafissatou Thiam (BEL)	Adrianna Sułek (POL)	Annik Kälin (SUI)
2024 Rome	Nafissatou Thiam (BEL)	Auriana Lazraq-Khlass (FRA)	Noor Vidts (BEL)
2026 Birmingham	Kate O'Connor (IRL)	Emma Oosterwegel (NED)	Sofie Dokter (NED)

== Mixed event ==
=== Mixed 4 × 400 metres relay ===
Games	Gold	Silver	Bronze
2024 Rome	Ireland; Christopher O'Donnell; Rhasidat Adeleke; Thomas Barr; Sharlene Mawdsley	Italy; Luca Sito; Anna Polinari; Edoardo Scotti; Alice Mangione	Netherlands; Liemarvin Bonevacia; Lieke Klaver; Isaya Klein Ikkink; Femke Bol
2026 Birmingham	Norway; Karsten Warholm; Amalie Iuel; Andreas Ofstad Kulseng; Henriette Jæger	Great Britain; Ben Jefferies; Charlotte Henrich; Toby Harries; Yemi Mary John	Netherlands; Jonas Phijffers; Lieke Klaver; Terrence Agard; Myrte van der Schoot

== See also ==
- List of European Athletics Championships medalists (men)
- List of World Athletics Championships medalists (men)
- List of World Athletics Championships medalists (women)
