= 1946 European Athletics Championships – Women's 100 metres =

Women's 100 metres at the 1946 European Athletics Championships
- Venue: Bislett Stadium
- Location: Oslo
- Dates: 22 August
- Competitors: 20 from 9 nations
- Winning time: 11.9

Medalists
gold medal	Yevgeniya Sechenova	Soviet Union
silver medal	Winifred Jordan	Great Britain
bronze medal	Claire Brésolles	France

The women's 100 metres at the 1946 European Athletics Championships was held in Oslo, Norway, at Bislett Stadium on 22 August 1946.

== Participation ==
According to an unofficial count, 20 athletes from 9 countries participated in the event.

- Czechoslovakia (2)
- Denmark (1)
- France (2)
- Netherlands (3)
- Norway (2)
- Poland (3)
- Soviet Union (1)
- Sweden (3)
- Great Britain (3)

== Results ==
=== Heats ===
22 August

==== Heat 1 ====
Rank	Name	Nationality	Time	Notes
1	Fanny Blankers-Koen	Netherlands	12.4	Q
2	Sylvia Cheeseman	Great Britain	12.8	Q
3	Monique Drilhon	France	12.9	Q
4	Mieczysława Moder	Poland	13.0	
5	Kerstin Josefsson	Sweden	13.0	
6	Liv Paulsen	Norway	13.2	

==== Heat 2 ====
Rank	Name	Nationality	Time	Notes
1	Yevgeniya Sechenova	Soviet Union	12.0	Q
2	Nettie Timmer	Netherlands	12.4	Q
3	Maureen Gardner	Great Britain	12.4	Q
4	Greta Magnusson	Sweden	12.5	
5	Dana Hiklova	Czechoslovakia	12.7	

==== Heat 3 ====
Rank	Name	Nationality	Time	Notes
1	Winifred Jordan	Great Britain	12.2	Q
2	Stanisława Walasiewicz	Poland	12.5	Q
3	Vera Bemova	Czechoslovakia	12.5	Q
4	Solveig Toms	Norway	12.6	

==== Heat 4 ====
Rank	Name	Nationality	Time	Notes
1	Claire Brésolles	France	12.2	Q
2	Gerda Koudijs	Netherlands	12.3	Q
3	Ann-Britt Leyman	Sweden	12.4	Q
4	Hilde Nissen	Denmark	12.5	NR
5	Irena Hejducka	Poland	13.2	

=== Semi-finals ===
22 August

==== Semi-final 1 ====
Rank	Name	Nationality	Time	Notes
1	Yevgeniya Sechenova	Soviet Union	12.0	Q
2	Winifred Jordan	Great Britain	12.4	Q
3	Gerda Koudijs	Netherlands	12.5	Q
4	Nettie Timmer	Netherlands	12.6	
5	Sylvia Cheeseman	Great Britain	12.7	
6	Vera Bemova	Czechoslovakia	12.7	

==== Semi-final 2 ====
Rank	Name	Nationality	Time	Notes
1	Maureen Gardner	Great Britain	12.2	Q
2	Claire Brésolles	France	12.3	Q
3	Ann-Britt Leyman	Sweden	12.3	Q
4	Stanisława Walasiewicz	Poland	12.6	
5	Monique Drilhon	France	12.7	
	Fanny Blankers-Koen	Netherlands	DNF	

=== Final ===
22 August

Rank	Name	Nationality	Time	Notes
1st place, gold medalist(s)	Yevgeniya Sechenova	Soviet Union	11.9	CR
2nd place, silver medalist(s)	Winifred Jordan	Great Britain	12.2	
3rd place, bronze medalist(s)	Claire Brésolles	France	12.2	
4	Ann-Britt Leyman	Sweden	12.2	
5	Maureen Gardner	Great Britain	12.2	
6	Gerda Koudijs	Netherlands	12.4	
