= 1946 European Athletics Championships – Women's 80 metres hurdles =

Women's 80 metres hurdles at the European Athletics Championships

The women's 80 metres hurdles at the 1946 European Athletics Championships was held in Oslo, Norway, at Bislett Stadion on 23 August 1946.

== Medalists ==
Gold	Fanny Blankers-Koen; Netherlands
Silver	Elene Gokieli; Soviet Union
Bronze	Valentina Fokina; Soviet Union

== Results ==
=== Final ===
23 August

Rank	Name	Nationality	Time	Notes
1st place, gold medalist(s)	Fanny Blankers-Koen	Netherlands	11.8	
2nd place, silver medalist(s)	Elene Gokieli	Soviet Union	11.9	
3rd place, bronze medalist(s)	Valentina Fokina	Soviet Union	11.9	
4	Anne Iversen	Denmark	12.3	
5	Anna Linnéa Sövgren	Sweden	12.4	
6	Marie Matesová	Czechoslovakia	12.4	

=== Heats ===
23 August

==== Heat 1 ====
Rank	Name	Nationality	Time	Notes
1	Fanny Blankers-Koen	Netherlands	11.7	Q
2	Elene Gokieli	Soviet Union	11.9	Q
3	Marie Matesová	Czechoslovakia	12.6	Q
4	Milly Ludwig	Luxembourg	13.2	
5	Aniela Mitan	Poland	13.3	
6	Ingrid Jacobsson	Sweden	14.2	

==== Heat 2 ====
Rank	Name	Nationality	Time	Notes
1	Valentina Fokina	Soviet Union	11.8	Q
2	Anna Linnéa Sövgren	Sweden	12.8	Q
3	Anne Iversen	Denmark	13.1	Q
	Gerda Koudijs	Netherlands	DQ	

== Participation ==
According to an unofficial count, 10 athletes from 7 countries participated in the event.

- Czechoslovakia (1)
- Denmark (1)
- Luxembourg (1)
- Netherlands (2)
- Poland (1)
- Soviet Union (2)
- Sweden (2)
