= 1946 European Athletics Championships – Women's 200 metres =

Women's 200 metres at the European Athletics Championships

The women's 200 metres at the 1946 European Athletics Championships was held in Oslo, Norway, at Bislett Stadion on 24 and 25 August 1946.

== Medalists ==
Gold	Yevgeniya Sechenova; Soviet Union
Silver	Winifred Jordan; Great Britain
Bronze	Léa Caurla; France

== Results ==
=== Final ===
25 August

Rank	Name	Nationality	Time	Notes
1st place, gold medalist(s)	Yevgeniya Sechenova	Soviet Union	25.4	
2nd place, silver medalist(s)	Winifred Jordan	Great Britain	25.6	
3rd place, bronze medalist(s)	Léa Caurla	France	25.6	
4	Marit Hemstad	Norway	25.7	
5	Sylvia Cheeseman	Great Britain	25.8	
6	Ann-Britt Leyman	Sweden	26.2	

=== Semi-finals ===
24 August

==== Semi-final 1 ====
Rank	Name	Nationality	Time	Notes
1	Léa Caurla	France	25.5	Q
2	Winifred Jordan	Great Britain	25.5	Q
3	Sylvia Cheeseman	Great Britain	25.8	Q
4	Dana Hiklova	Czechoslovakia	26.3	
5	Solveig Toms	Norway	27.0	
	Jadwiga Słomczewska	Poland	DNS	

==== Semi-final 2 ====
Rank	Name	Nationality	Time	Notes
1	Yevgeniya Sechenova	Soviet Union	25.1	Q
2	Marit Hemstad	Norway	25.7	Q
3	Ann-Britt Leyman	Sweden	25.8	Q
4	Stanisława Walasiewicz	Poland	26.0	
5	Joyce Judd	Great Britain	26.1	
6	Mieczysława Moder	Poland	26.2	

=== Heats ===
24 August

==== Heat 1 ====
Rank	Name	Nationality	Time	Notes
1	Léa Caurla	France	25.2	Q
2	Stanisława Walasiewicz	Poland	25.4	Q
3	Winifred Jordan	Great Britain	25.7	Q
4	Vera Bemova	Czechoslovakia	26.2	
5	Hilde Nissen	Denmark	26.6	NR

==== Heat 2 ====
Rank	Name	Nationality	Time	Notes
1	Sylvia Cheeseman	Great Britain	26.0	Q
2	Dana Hiklova	Czechoslovakia	27.1	Q
3	Solveig Toms	Norway	27.2	Q

==== Heat 3 ====
Rank	Name	Nationality	Time	Notes
1	Marit Hemstad	Norway	25.9	Q
2	Ann-Britt Leyman	Sweden	27.3	Q
3	Jadwiga Słomczewska	Poland	27.6	Q

==== Heat 4 ====
Rank	Name	Nationality	Time	Notes
1	Yevgeniya Sechenova	Soviet Union	25.2	Q
2	Joyce Judd	Great Britain	26.3	Q
3	Mieczysława Moder	Poland	26.9	Q

== Participation ==
According to an unofficial count, 14 athletes from 8 countries participated in the event.

- Czechoslovakia (2)
- Denmark (1)
- France (1)
- Norway (2)
- Poland (3)
- Soviet Union (1)
- Sweden (1)
- Great Britain (3)
