= 1946 European Athletics Championships – Women's long jump =

Women's long jump at the European Athletics Championships

The women's long jump at the 1946 European Athletics Championships was held in Oslo, Norway, at Bislett Stadion on 23 August 1946.

== Medalists ==
Gold	Gerda Koudijs; Netherlands
Silver	Lidija Gaile; Soviet Union
Bronze	Valentina Vasilyeva; Soviet Union

== Results ==
=== Final ===
23 August

Rank	Name	Nationality	Result	Notes
1st place, gold medalist(s)	Gerda Koudijs	Netherlands	5.67	
2nd place, silver medalist(s)	Lidija Gaile	Soviet Union	5.66	
3rd place, bronze medalist(s)	Valentina Vasilyeva	Soviet Union	5.63	
4	Amelia Piccinini	Italy	5.28	
5	Anne Iversen	Denmark	5.25	
6	Ulla-Britt Althin	Sweden	5.24	
7	Greta Magnusson	Sweden	5.21	
8	Ilona Fekete	Hungary	5.16	
9	Aslaug Solheim	Norway	5.06	
10	Edith Øieren	Norway	4.92	
11	Milly Ludwig	Luxembourg	4.91	

=== Qualification ===
23 August

Rank	Name	Nationality	Result	Notes
1	Gerda Koudijs	Netherlands	5.42	Q
2	Valentina Vasilyeva	Soviet Union	5.40	Q
3	Greta Magnusson	Sweden	5.38	Q
4	Aslaug Solheim	Norway	5.24	Q
5	Amelia Piccinini	Italy	5.21	Q
6	Anne Iversen	Denmark	5.20	Q
7	Edith Øieren	Norway	5.14	Q
8	Ulla-Britt Althin	Sweden	5.13	Q
9	Ilona Fekete	Hungary	5.10	Q
10	Stanisława Walasiewicz	Poland	5.00	
11	Dora Gardner	Great Britain	5.00	
12	Joyce Judd	Great Britain	4.77	
13	Kathleen Dyer-Tilley	Great Britain	4.50	
14	Aasnild Brandvold	Norway	4.26	

== Participation ==
According to an unofficial count, 16 athletes from 10 countries participated in the event.

- Denmark (1)
- Hungary (1)
- Italy (1)
- Luxembourg (1)
- Netherlands (1)
- Norway (3)
- Poland (1)
- Soviet Union (2)
- Sweden (2)
- Great Britain (3)
