= 1946 European Athletics Championships – Women's 4 × 100 metres relay =

Women's 4 × 100 metres relay at the European Athletics Championships

The women's 4 × 100 metres relay at the 1946 European Athletics Championships was held in Oslo, Norway, at Bislett Stadion on 25 August 1946.

== Medalists ==
| Gold | Gerda Koudijs; Nettie Timmer; Martha Adema; Fanny Blankers-Koen; Netherlands |
| Silver | Léa Caurla; Anne-Marie Colchen; Claire Brésolles; Monique Drilhon; France |
| Bronze | Yevgeniya Sechenova; Valentina Fokina; Elene Gokieli; Valentina Vasilyeva; Soviet Union |

== Results ==
=== Final ===
25 August

| Rank | Nation | Competitors | Time | Notes |
|---|---|---|---|---|
| 1st place, gold medalist(s) | Netherlands | Gerda Koudijs; Nettie Timmer; Martha Adema; Fanny Blankers-Koen | 47.8 | |
| 2nd place, silver medalist(s) | France | Léa Caurla; Anne-Marie Colchen; Claire Brésolles; Monique Drilhon | 48.5 | |
| 3rd place, bronze medalist(s) | Soviet Union | Yevgeniya Sechenova; Valentina Fokina; Elene Gokieli; Valentina Vasilyeva | 48.7 | |
| 4 | Great Britain | Joyce Judd; Sylvia Cheeseman; Maureen Gardner; Winifred Jordan | 48.7 | |
| 5 | Sweden | Greta Magnusson; Kerstin Josefsson; Ulla-Britt Althin; Ann-Britt Leyman | 49.3 | |
| 6 | Poland | Irena Hejducka; Stanisława Walasiewicz; Mieczysława Moder; Jadwiga Słomczewska | 50.6 | |

== Participation ==
According to an unofficial count, 24 athletes from 6 countries participated in the event.

- France (4)
- Netherlands (4)
- Poland (4)
- Soviet Union (4)
- Sweden (4)
- Great Britain (4)
