= 1946 European Athletics Championships – Women's high jump =

Women's high jump at the European Athletics Championships

The women's high jump at the 1946 European Athletics Championships was held in Oslo, Norway, at Bislett Stadium on 22 August 1946.

== Medalists ==
Gold	Anne-Marie Colchen; France
Silver	Aleksandra Chudina; Soviet Union
Bronze	Anne Iversen; Denmark

== Results ==
=== Final ===
22 August

Rank	Name	Nationality	Result	Notes
1st place, gold medalist(s)	Anne-Marie Colchen	France	1.60	
2nd place, silver medalist(s)	Aleksandra Chudina	Soviet Union	1.57	
3rd place, bronze medalist(s)	Anne Iversen	Denmark	1.57	NR
4	Fanny Blankers-Koen	Netherlands	1.57	
5	Micheline Ostermeyer	France	1.57	
6	Triny Bourkel	Luxembourg	1.57	
7	Dora Gardner	Great Britain	1.54	
8	Milly Ludwig	Luxembourg	1.48	
9	Joyce Judd	Great Britain	1.45	
10	Edith Øieren	Norway	1.40	

== Participation ==
According to an unofficial count, 10 athletes from 7 countries participated in the event.

- Denmark (1)
- France (2)
- Luxembourg (2)
- Netherlands (1)
- Norway (1)
- Soviet Union (1)
- Great Britain (2)
