= 1950 European Athletics Championships – Women's 4 × 100 metres relay =

Women's 4 × 100 metres relay at the European Athletics Championships

The women's 4 × 100 metres relay at the 1950 European Athletics Championships was held in Brussels, Belgium, at Stade du Heysel on 27 August 1950.

== Medalists ==
Gold	Elspeth Hay; Jean Desforges; Dorothy Hall; June Foulds; Great Britain
Silver	Xenia Stad-de Jong; Bertha Brouwer; Grietje de Jongh; Fanny Blankers-Koen; Netherlands
Bronze	Elene Gokieli; Sofya Malshina; Zoya Dukhovich; Yevgeniya Sechenova; Soviet Union

== Results ==
=== Final ===
27 August

Rank	Nation	Competitors	Time	Notes
1st place, gold medalist(s)	Great Britain	Elspeth Hay; Jean Desforges; Dorothy Hall; June Foulds	47.4	
2nd place, silver medalist(s)	Netherlands	Xenia Stad-de Jong; Bertha Brouwer; Grietje de Jongh; Fanny Blankers-Koen	47.4	
3rd place, bronze medalist(s)	Soviet Union	Elene Gokieli; Sofya Malshina; Zoya Dukhovich; Yevgeniya Sechenova	47.5	
4	France	Rosine Faugouin; Micheline Ostermeyer; Colette Aitelli; Yvette Monginou	48.5	
5	Italy	Maria Musso; Laura Sivi; Micaela Bora; Vittoria Cesarini	48.7	
6	Yugoslavia	Spomenka Koledin; Milica Šumak; Mira Tuce; Alma Butja	49.8	

== Participation ==
According to an unofficial count, 24 athletes from 6 countries participated in the event.

- France (4)
- Italy (4)
- Netherlands (4)
- Soviet Union (4)
- Great Britain (4)
- Yugoslavia (4)
