= Anne-Marie Colchen =

French basketballer and athlete (1925–2017)

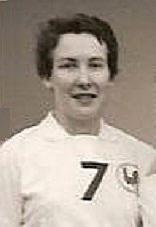
- Colchen (top left) with the 1953 French women's basketball squad

Medal record

Women's athletics

Representing France

European Championships
Gold medal – first place	1946 Oslo	High jump
Silver medal – second place	1946 Oslo	4×100 m relay

Women's basketball

FIBA World Cup
Bronze medal – third place	1953 Santiago	

Anne-Marie Colchen-Maillet (8 December 1925 – 26 January 2017) was a French track and field athlete and women's basketball player. She became France's first high jump champion at the 1946 European Athletics Championships and held the French record for the event for ten years. She represented France in high jump at the 1948 Summer Olympics. In basketball, she was the highest scorer at the 1953 FIBA World Championship for Women, helping France to third place. She was a member of the French national team for the European Women's Basketball Championship in 1950, 1952, 1954, and 1956. She was inducted into the French Basketball Hall of Fame in 2005.

== Career ==
Born in Le Havre, she joined up with the local sports club, the Association Sportive Augustin Normand (ASAN). Standing at a height of 1.82 m (5 ft 11 1/2 in) – unusually tall for a woman in that era – she found she had a natural talent for high jump and basketball.

=== Athletics ===
Colchen first emerged as a high jumper in the mid-1940s, and she ranked in the world's top twenty in 1944, clearing five feet (1.5 m). She rose to the peak of the international scene with a gold medal win at the 1946 European Athletics Championships, holding off the Soviet all-round athlete Aleksandra Chudina with her winning height of 1.60 m (5 ft 2 3/4 in). As of 2015, Colchen remains the only French woman to win a European high jump title (Jacques Madubost won the men's event in 1966). She followed this with a silver medal in the 4×100 metres relay, running alongside her compatriots Léa Caurla, Claire Brésolles and Monique Drilhon to finish behind a Fanny Blankers-Koen-led Dutch team.

Colchen made two further appearances in major international athletics competitions: she was selected for France at the 1948 Summer Olympics, where her jump of 1.40 m (4 ft 7 in) was only enough for 14th at the Games in London, and attempted to defend her title at the 1950 European Athletics Championships, ultimately finishing sixth with her best clearance of 1.50 m (4 ft 11 in). Over the course of her career Colchen was a four-time national champion at the French Athletics Championships, winning straight titles from 1946 to 1950, with the exception of 1947 when Micheline Ostermeyer was the victor. She broke he French record for the high jump in 1949 with her lifetime best clearance of 1.63 m (5 ft 4 in). This mark stood for ten years, at which point Florence Pétry-Amiel added an additional centimetre to the national standard. She made eleven international appearances for France in athletics, spanning 1946 to 1955.

=== Basketball ===
Although Colchen's high jump and basketball careers coincided, it took her a little longer to reach the same heights in basketball. Playing as a centre, she made her international debut for the French basketball team in February 1946, appearing against Belgium. In her first major tournament appearance at the 1950 FIBA European Women's Basketball Championship she was France's leading points scorer in two of their group games and two games in the final group stage (amassing 25 against Italy) in their last game. The team finished fourth overall, with Colchen averaging 14.5 points per game. At 87 in total, she was the tournament's leader on points. She returned for the 1952 European Championship but played a smaller role, appearing in only two games, but still being the team's third-highest scorer. France finished seventh that year.

Colchen reached the peak of her basketball career at the 1953 FIBA World Championship for Women. It was the first time that a world tournament for women had been held. Colchen was by far and away the leading points scorer at the competition, having a points per game average of 19.2 and a total of 115 points (over thirty more than the next best, Onésima Reyes of Chile). She was France's leading scorer in four of their six games. A loss to Chile in the final round meant the French women came third overall, taking the bronze medal behind the host nation and the American winners.

She made two more appearances at the European Championships after her world medal. The 1954 event saw France beat Austria and Italy to qualify for the final round, but they performed poorly once there, losing all five games to bottom the group in sixth. She returned to the squad for the 1956 edition and was France's top scorer in the first game (a loss to Hungary). Strong performances by Édith Tavert-Kloechner led France to wins over Germany and Romania. The pair again led the scoring for France in the semi-round, but heavy losses to Bulgaria and the hosts Czechoslovakia saw them eliminated from the tournament. Over the course of her international basketball career, she earned 66 selections, scored 455 points, and managed a record high of 30 points in a single game. Her last international game was against Austria at the 1956 European Championships.

=== Later life ===
After retiring from active competition she went into coaching. Colchen was inducted into the Gloire du sport (the French national sports hall of fame) in 2002, being only the third inductee for basketball and the first of those to be a woman. She was admitted to the Académie du Basket in 2005, featuring in the second year of admission and the second woman entrant after Jacky Chazalon. She was honoured as Chevalier de la Légion d'honneur in 2009 in respect of her achievements and 65-year-long dedication to sports in France. Among her other honours are the Médaille d'or de l'Education Physique (1945) and the Palme académique des Chevaliers du Mérite sportif.

== National titles ==
- French Athletics Championships
  - High jump: 1946, 1948, 1949, 1950
- French Basketball Championships
  - Club: 1950, 1951, 1952

== International competitions ==
=== Athletics ===
Year	Competition	Venue	Position	Event	Notes
1946	European Championships	Oslo, Norway	1st	High jump	1.60 m
1946	European Championships	Oslo, Norway	2nd	4 × 100 m relay	48.5 sec
1948	Olympic Games	London, United Kingdom	14th	High jump	1.40 m
1950	European Championships	Brussels, Belgium	6th	High jump	1.50 m

=== Basketball ===
Year	Competition	Venue	Position	Notes
1950	EuroBasket	Budapest, Hungary	4th	
1952	EuroBasket	Moscow, Soviet Union	7th	
1953	FIBA World Championship	Santiago, Chile	3rd	
1954	EuroBasket	Belgrade, Yugoslavia	6th	
1956	EuroBasket	Prague, Czechoslovakia	7th	

== See also ==
- List of European Athletics Championships medalists (women)
