= Øiseth =

Øiseth is a surname. Notable people with the surname include:

- Hildegunn Øiseth (born 1966), Norwegian jazz musician
- Marit Øiseth (1928–1971), Norwegian sprinter and cross-country skier
