= 1950 European Athletics Championships – Women's 200 metres =

Women's 200 metres at the European Athletics Championships

The women's 200 metres at the 1950 European Athletics Championships was held in Brussels, Belgium, at Stade du Heysel on 26 and 27 August 1950.

== Medalists ==
Gold	Fanny Blankers-Koen; Netherlands
Silver	Yevgeniya Sechenova; Soviet Union
Bronze	Dorothy Hall; Great Britain

== Results ==
=== Final ===
27 August Wind: -0.6 m/s

Rank	Name	Nationality	Time	Notes
1st place, gold medalist(s)	Fanny Blankers-Koen	Netherlands	24.0	NR
2nd place, silver medalist(s)	Yevgeniya Sechenova	Soviet Union	24.8	
3rd place, bronze medalist(s)	Dorothy Hall	Great Britain	25.0	
4	Sofya Malshina	Soviet Union	25.0	
5	Bertha Brouwer	Netherlands	25.0	
6	Zoya Dukhovich	Soviet Union	25.5	

=== Heats ===
26 August

==== Heat 1 ====
Wind: 1.9 m/s

Rank	Name	Nationality	Time	Notes
1	Fanny Blankers-Koen	Netherlands	24.5	Q
2	Zoya Dukhovich	Soviet Union	25.2	Q
3	Margaret Brian	Great Britain	25.4	
4	Micaela Bora	Italy	26.3	
5	Mira Tuce	Yugoslavia	26.5	

==== Heat 2 ====
Wind: 0.3 m/s

Rank	Name	Nationality	Time	Notes
1	Dorothy Hall	Great Britain	24.6	Q
2	Sofya Malshina	Soviet Union	25.0	Q
3	Grietje de Jongh	Netherlands	25.3	
4	Rosine Faugouin	France	25.7	

==== Heat 3 ====
Wind: 0.8 m/s

Rank	Name	Nationality	Time	Notes
1	Yevgeniya Sechenova	Soviet Union	25.0	Q
2	Bertha Brouwer	Netherlands	25.1	Q
3	Elspeth Hay	Great Britain	25.5	
4	Laura Sivi	Italy	25.6	
5	Alma Butja	Yugoslavia	26.8	

== Participation ==
According to an unofficial count, 14 athletes from 6 countries participated in the event.

- France (1)
- Italy (2)
- Netherlands (3)
- Soviet Union (3)
- Great Britain (3)
- Yugoslavia (2)
