= Liv Paulsen =

Norwegian shot putter and sprinter

Liv Paulsen (29 November 1925 – 3 November 2001) was a Norwegian 100 metres sprinter and shot putter. She represented IL Viking in Stavanger.

She finished eighth in the shot put final at the 1946 European Championships with a throw of 10.37 metres. At the 1948 Summer Olympics she did not progress from the qualification round in neither shot put nor 100 m. She won the shot put event at the ingaugural Norwegian championships for women in 1947.

Her personal best throw was 11.16 metres, achieved in June 1948 in Oslo.
