= Amelia Piccinini =

Italian shot putter (1917-1979)

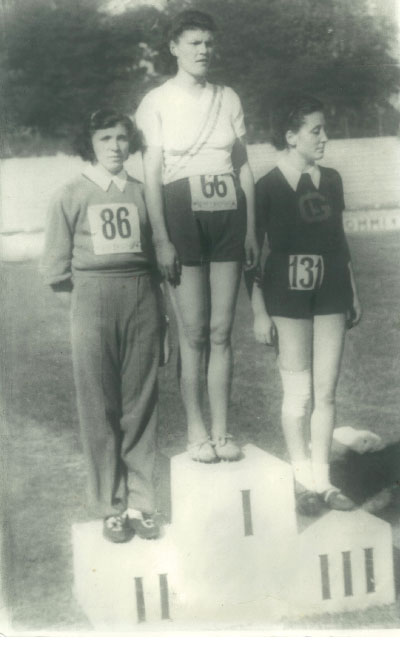
- Piccinini (#86 on the left), 2nd on the podium for shot put at the 1938 Italian Athletics Championships

Personal information
- National team: Italy: 28 (1937-1954)
- Born: 20 January 1917 Alessandria, Italy
- Died: 3 April 1979 (aged 62) Turin, Italy

Sport
- Sport: Athletics
- Event: Shot put
- Club: Venchi Unica Torino

Achievements and titles
- Personal best: 13.39 m (1949)
Medal record
Women's athletics
Representing Italy
Olympic Games
Silver medal – second place	1948 London	Shot put
European Championships
Bronze medal – third place	1946 Oslo	Shot put

Amelia Piccinini (20 January 1917 – 3 April 1979) was an Italian athlete and before footballer.

She won two medals, at senior level, at the International athletics competitions.

== Career ==
She competed for Italy at the 1948 Summer Olympics held in London, England, where she won the silver medal in the Women's Shot Put event.

In 1946 at the European Championships she won the bronze medal in the shot put and finished four in the long jump.

== Achievements ==
Year	Competition	Venue	Rank	Event	Measure	Notes
1938	European Championships	(Austria) Vienna	Shot put	9th	11.30 m	
1946	European Championships	(Norway) Oslo	Shot put	3rd	12.21 m	
1946	European Championships	(Norway) Oslo	Long jump	4th	5.28 m	
1948	Olympic Games	(United Kingdom) Londra	Shot put	2nd	13.095 m	
1950	European Championships	(Belgium) Brussels	Shot put	7th	12.40 m	

== National titles ==
Amelia Piccinini has won 20 times consecutively the individual national championship.

- 4 wins in the long jump (1939, 1940, 1943, 1946)
- 12 wins in the shot put (1941, 1942, 1943, 1946, 1947, 1948, 1949, 1950, 1951, 1952, 1953, 1954)
- 4 wins in the pentathlon (1937, 1946, 1947, 1948)

== See also ==
- Italian Athletics Championships - Multi winners
