= Pierre Brésolles =

French sprinter

Medal record

Women's athletics

Representing France

European Championships
| Silver medal – second place | 1946 Oslo | 4×100 m |
| Bronze medal – third place | 1946 Oslo | 100 m |

Pierre Joseph Brésoles, born Claire Brésolles, (10 November 1929 – 13 January 2018) was a French runner who ran the 100 metre and 200 metre races. In the 1950s, Pierre came out as a trans man.

== Life ==
Pierre grew up in Occitanie, with his speed being noted when he was a teenager. As a 15 year old he broke French record for the 400 metres. He joined the French national team around 1946, around the same time as his main opponent, Léon Caurla (who later also proved to be a trans man). Their first competition together was 1946 European Athletics Championships in Oslo, in relay with Anne-Marie Colchen and Monique Drilhon. The team broke the French record and won the silver medal. Pierre also won third in the 100-meter sprint, breaking the French record.

While some modern American biographies, such as the one by Eli Erlick, have presented Léon and Pierre as lovers, this is a misunderstanding: they were teammates but were not recorded to be romantically involved together in any earlier sources, whether in French or in English. French books on the topic, such as Max Foerster's Histoire des Transsexuels, do not mention a relationship between the two men. Both married women and never mentioned any non-straight identity.

Pierre came out as a trans man a month after the 1946 championships, and Léon did the same later, in 1947. They were recruited for the 1948 Summer Olympics, but they refused to undergo sex verification.

Pierre began his medical transition in 1948 and by 1949 he was finished with gender-affirming surgeries, attracting media attention. After that, he joined AS Carcassonne, playing as a wing three-quarter. He earned two bachelor's degrees in history and geography at University of Toulouse. Later in life he became a farmer, got married and started a family.

== See also ==
- Gender test
