= Marit Øiseth =

Norwegian sprinter and cross-country skier

Marit Øiseth (née Hemstad, 29 December 1928–5 October 1971) was a Norwegian sprinter and cross-country skier of the 1940s and 1950s who participated in the 1952 Winter Olympics, held in Oslo.

She was born in Nord-Odal Municipality in Hedmark county in southeastern Norway. She never participated in the Summer Olympics, but finished fourth at the 1946 European Championships at Bislett stadion in a personal best time for the 200m of 25.7 seconds. This remained her career best time. She never became Norwegian champion, but women were not included in the Norwegian championships before 1947.

She attained the opportunity to represent her country when the Norwegian capital served as the host city for that year's Winter Olympics. She ultimately finished seventh in the 10 km event.

Marit Øiseth died in her home in Nord-Odal Municipality twelve weeks before her 43rd birthday.

== Cross-country skiing results ==
=== Olympic Games ===
Year	Age	10 km
1952	23	7

=== World Championships ===
Year	Age	10 km	3 × 5 km relay
1954	25	16	4
