= Léon Caurla =

French sprinter

Medal record

Women's athletics

Representing France

European Championships
Silver medal – second place	1946 Oslo	4×100 m
Bronze medal – third place	1946 Oslo	200 m

Léon Caurla, born Léa Caurla, (4 September 1926, Etain – 2 March 2002) was a French athlete in the 100m and 200m events. He was notably 3rd in the Oslo European Championship in 1946 for the 200m. He is especially known for being a trans man.

== Life ==
Léon was born in rural Meuse, the son of Italian immigrants Silvio and Severina Caurla. His father, Silvio, fled Mussolini's fascist Italy for France in the 1920s. Silvio's family were stonemasons from father to son. The couple had four children, Rita, Léon, Guido and Odile. During World War I, the Meuse region had suffered extensive damage, and the Caurla family helped rebuild the church in Étain.

Léon was born intersex, with a concealed penis and testicles. During puberty, he started growing a beard. The topic was taboo in the family, and they kept raising him as a girl.

He joined the French national team around 1946, around the same time as his main opponent, Pierre Brésolles (who later also proved to be a trans man). Their first competition together was 1946 European Athletics Championships in Oslo, in relay with Anne-Marie Colchen and Monique Drilhon. The team broke the French record and won the silver medal. Léon also won third in the 200-meter sprint.

While some modern American biographies, such as the one by Eli Erlick, have presented Léon and Pierre as lovers, this is a misunderstanding: they were teammates but were not recorded to be romantically involved together in any earlier sources, whether in French or in English. French books on the topic, such as Max Foerster's Histoire des Transsexuels, do not mention a relationship between the two men. Both married women and never mentioned any non-straight identity.

Pierre came out as a trans man a month after the 1946 championships, and Léon did the same later, after winning first place in a 1947 British-French running competition. They were recruited for the 1948 Summer Olympics, but they refused to undergo sex verification.

Léon had genital surgery in 1952 as part of his transition. The surgery was difficult and he remained in a coma for three weeks, hovering between life and death. He was granted legal name and gender marker change on February 13, 1952. Now legally male, he married his partner Denise. The couple had a son, Dominique. He moved to Warcq, and joined the French Air Force in 1955. As he was very physically strong, he worked in his family's woodchopping business for some time. He later became a travelling florist after his son's birth.

Léon remained passionate about sports his whole life. He was a basketball coach and referee, and was at some point the director of the soccer club in Étain. Even while he was in a wheelchair after a stroke when he was older, he remained dedicated to sports and practiced disabled archery. He was an ardent follower of sports competitions on television, and died watching a rugby match.

== See as well ==
- Gender test
