= Elene Gok'ieli =

Georgian hurdler

Personal information
- Nationality: Georgian
- Born: 25 August 1918 Tiflis, Democratic Republic of Georgia
- Died: 31 December 1992 (aged 74) Tbilisi, Georgia

Sport
- Sport: Track and field
- Event: 80 metres hurdles
Medal record
Women's athletics
Representing Soviet Union
European Championships
| Silver medal – second place | 1946 Oslo | 80 m hurdles |
| Bronze medal – third place | 1946 Oslo | 4×100 m |
| Bronze medal – third place | 1950 Brussels | 4×100 m |

Elene Gok'ieli (ელენე გოკიელი; 25 August 1918 – 31 December 1992) was a Soviet Georgian hurdler. She competed in the women's 80 metres hurdles at the 1952 Summer Olympics, setting a national record in the event. Gok'ieli was affiliated with Dynamo Tbilisi. In 1946, she was the national long jump champion, and was recognized as an Honoured Master of Sport of the USSR.
