= Yevgeniya Sechenova =

Soviet sprinter

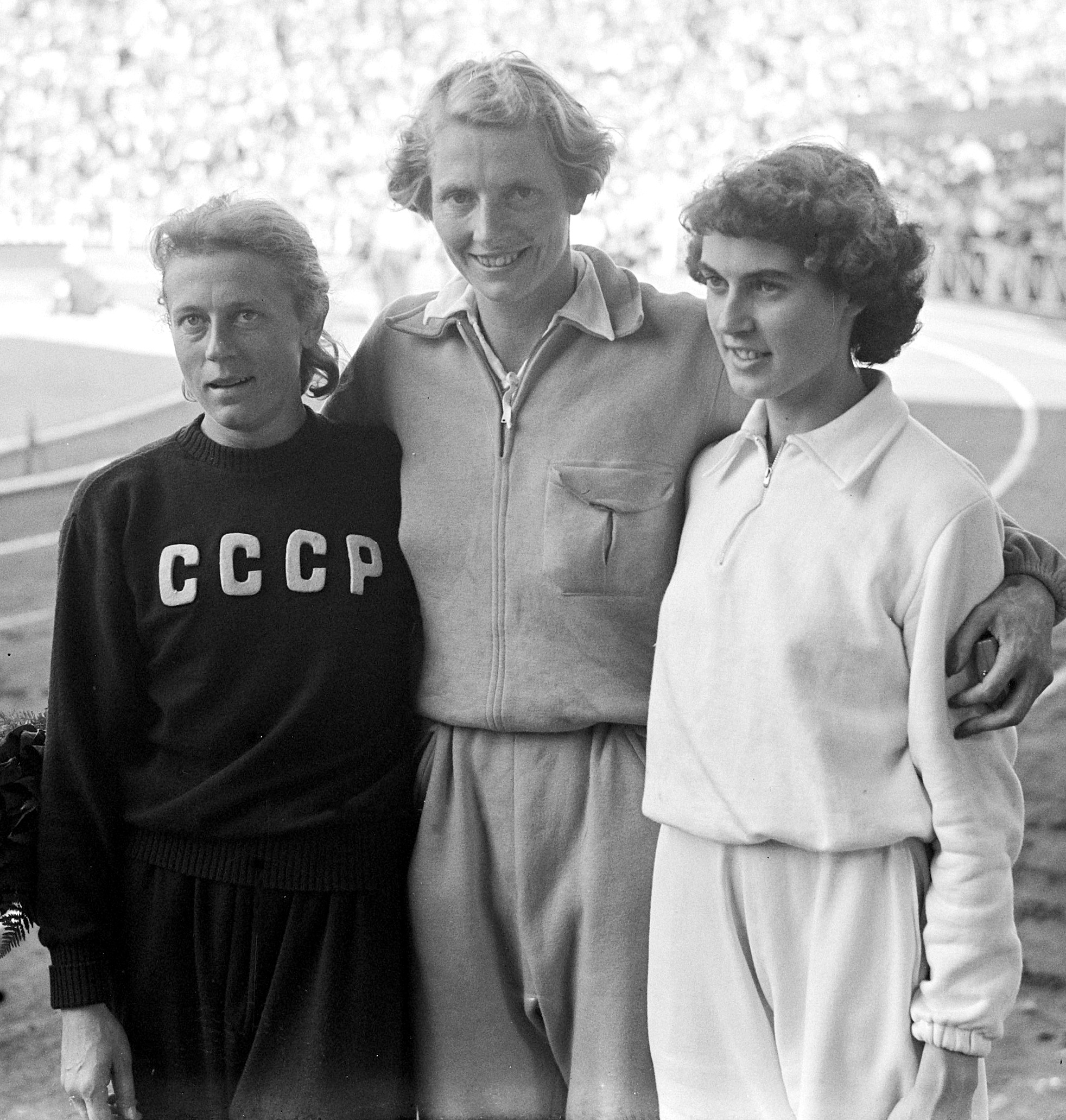
- Yevgeniya Sechenova, Fanny Blankers-Koen and Dorothy Manley at the 1950 European championships

Personal information
- Born: 17 August 1918 Sevastopol, Crimea
- Died: 25 June 1990 (aged 71) Moscow, Soviet Union
- Height: 1.73 m (5 ft 8 in)
- Weight: 60 kg (132 lb)

Sport
- Sport: Athletics
- Club: Dynamo Moscow
Medal record
Women's athletics
Representing the Soviet Union
European Championships
Gold medal – first place	1946 Oslo	100 m
Gold medal – first place	1946 Oslo	200 m
Silver medal – second place	1950 Brussels	100 m
Silver medal – second place	1950 Brussels	200 m
Bronze medal – third place	1946 Oslo	4×100 m
Bronze medal – third place	1950 Brussels	4×100 m

Yevgeniya Ivanovna Sechenova (Russian: Евгения Ивановна Сеченова; 17 August 1918 – 25 June 1990) was a Soviet sprint runner who won six medals at the European championships in 1946 and 1950. She was part of the Soviet 4 × 200 m relay team that set world records in 1950 and 1951. She also competed in the 200 m and 4 × 100 m relay at the 1952 Summer Olympics and finished fourth in the relay.

Sechenova won 20 national titles in 100 m (1940, 1946, 1947, 1949, 1950), 200 m (1939, 1940, 1944, 1949), 4 × 100 m (1939, 1940, 1946, 1949–1951) and 4 × 200 m (1946, 1948–1951). She was awarded the Order of the Red Banner of Labour.
