= Winifred Jordan =

English athlete (1920–2019)

Winifred Jordan (née Jeffrey)
Personal information
- Nationality: British (English)
- Born: 15 March 1920 Kings Norton, England
- Died: 13 April 2019 (aged 99)
- Height: 171 cm (5 ft 7 in)
- Weight: 58 kg (128 lb)

Sport
- Sport: Athletics
- Event: Sprints
- Club: Birchfield Harriers
Medal record
Women's athletics
Representing England
British Empire Games
Silver medal – second place	1938 Sydney	4×110/220 yd
Bronze medal – third place	1938 Sydney	3×110/220 yd
European Championships
Silver medal – second place	1946 Oslo	100 m
Silver medal – second place	1946 Oslo	200 m

Winifred Sadie Jordan (née Jeffrey; 15 March 1920 – 13 April 2019) was an English athlete who competed at the 1938 British Empire Games, 1946 European Athletics Championships, and 1948 Summer Olympics.

== Biography ==
Winifred Sadie Jeffrey was born in Kings Norton, Birmingham. She left school aged 14 to work at Dunlop, where her father was employed, and where she participated with the athletics club.

Before her marriage and competing as Winifred Jeffrey, she became the national 100 metres champion after winning the British WAAA Championships at the 1937 WAAA Championships.

In the athletics at the 1938 British Empire Games in Sydney, she was a member of the English relay team which won the silver medal in the 220-110-220-110 yards event and the bronze medal in the 110-220-110 yards competition. In the 100 yards contest she was eliminated in the semi-finals.

Her athletics career was interrupted by the Second World War but on 18 August 1945 she won three WAAA titles at the 1945 WAAA Championships and then she won silver medals in the 100 metres and 200 metres at the 1946 European Athletics Championships in Oslo, while her 4 × 100 metres relay team came fourth.

She regained her WAAA title at the 1947 WAAA Championships and the 1948 WAAA Championships.

At the 1948 Summer Olympics in London, she was eliminated in the semi-finals of the women's 100 metres. Jordan died on 13 April 2019 at the age of 99.
