= Ann-Britt Leyman =

Swedish long jumper and sprinter (1922–2013)

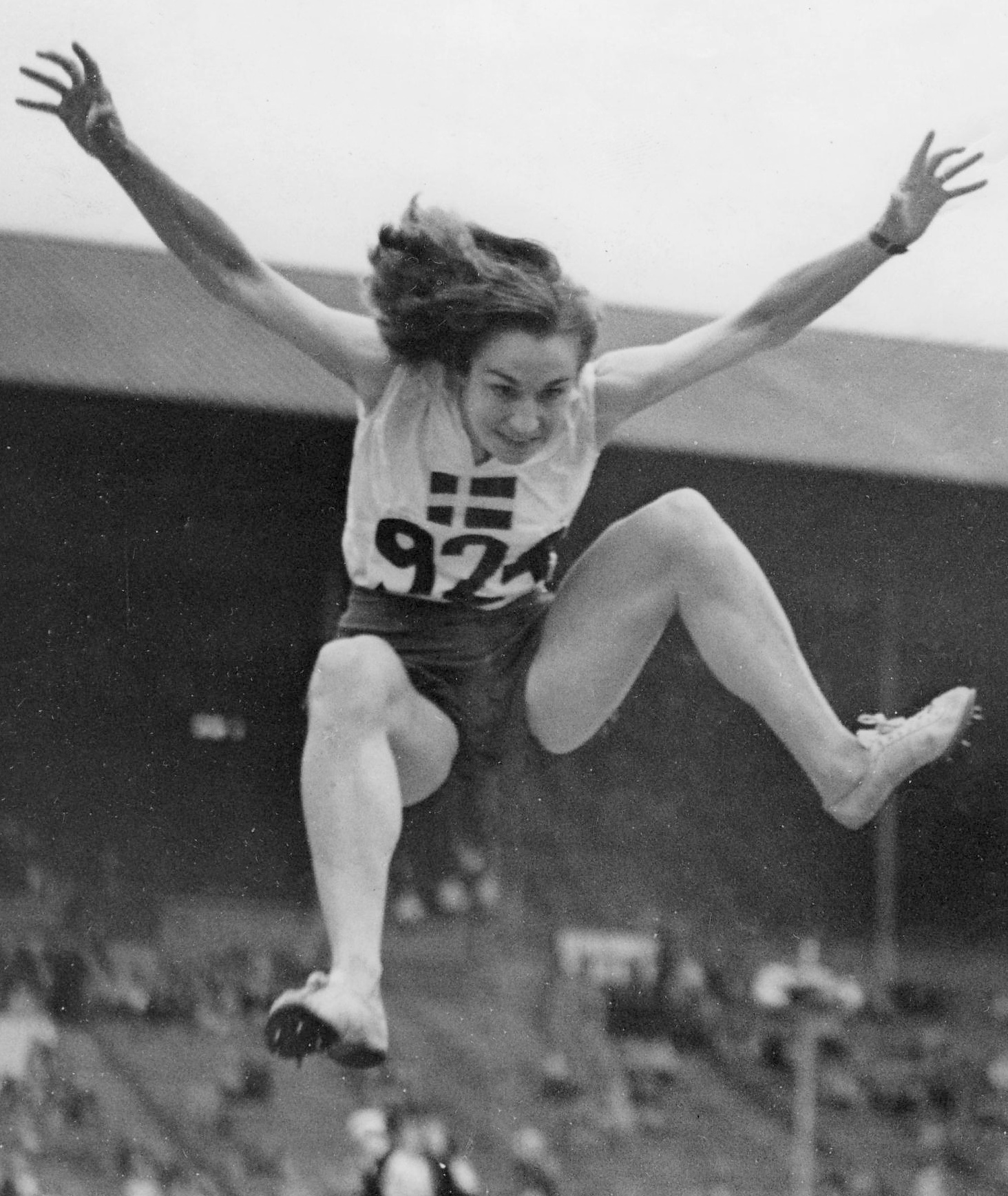
- Leyman at the 1948 Olympics

Personal information
- Born: 10 June 1922 Stenungsund, Sweden
- Died: 5 January 2013 (aged 90) Hisings Kärra, Sweden
- Height: 1.68 m (5 ft 6 in)
- Weight: 64 kg (141 lb)

Sport
- Sport: Athletics
- Events: 100 m, 200 m, long jump
- Club: Kvinnliga IK Sport

Achievements and titles
- Personal bests: 100 m – 12.0 (1948); 200 m – 25.8 (1946); LJ – 5.58 m (1948)
Medal record
Representing Sweden
Olympic Games
Bronze medal – third place	1948 London	Long jump

Ann-Britt Leyman (later Olsson; 10 June 1922 – 5 January 2013) was a Swedish sprinter and long jumper who won a bronze medal in the long jump at the 1948 Summer Olympics.

Leyman never won a national long jump title, but she won 15 national sprint championships: in the 80 m (1941), 100 m (1942–44 and 1946–49) and 200 m (1942–47 and 1949). At the 1946 European Athletics Championships she finished fourth-sixth in the 100 m, 200 m and 4 × 100 m relay events.
