= Monique Drilhon =

French sprinter (1922–2019)

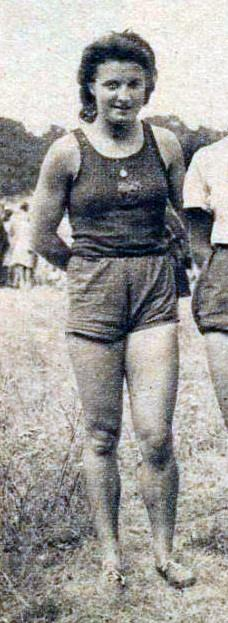
- Monique Drilhon in July 1943 in Reims

Medal record

Women's athletics

Representing France

European Championships
Silver medal – second place	1946 Oslo	4×100 m

Monique Jeannine Marie Drilhon (16 December 1922 – 11 December 2019) was a French athlete, that specialized in the sprints.

== Biography ==
Drilhon was born in Bordeaux in December 1922. She won the title of 100 metres and 200 metres during the Athletics championships in France in 1943.

Selected for 1946 European Championships, at Oslo, Monique Drilhon won the silver medal in the 4 × 100 metres relay, with Léa Caurla, Anne-Marie Colchen and Claire Brésolles. The France team, which set a new record for France in 48.5 seconds in the relay, lost to the Netherlands.

Her married name was Dubreuilh. She died in December 2019 in Gradignan at the age of 96.

== International competitions ==
Year	Competition	Venue	Position	Event	Notes
1946	European Championships	Oslo	2nd	Relay 4 × 100 m	

=== Personal records ===
Event	Performance	Location	Date
100 metres	12.9		1946
200 metres	26.5		1946

== Sources ==
- DocAthlé 2003, French Athletics Federation, p. 400
