= Greta Magnusson =

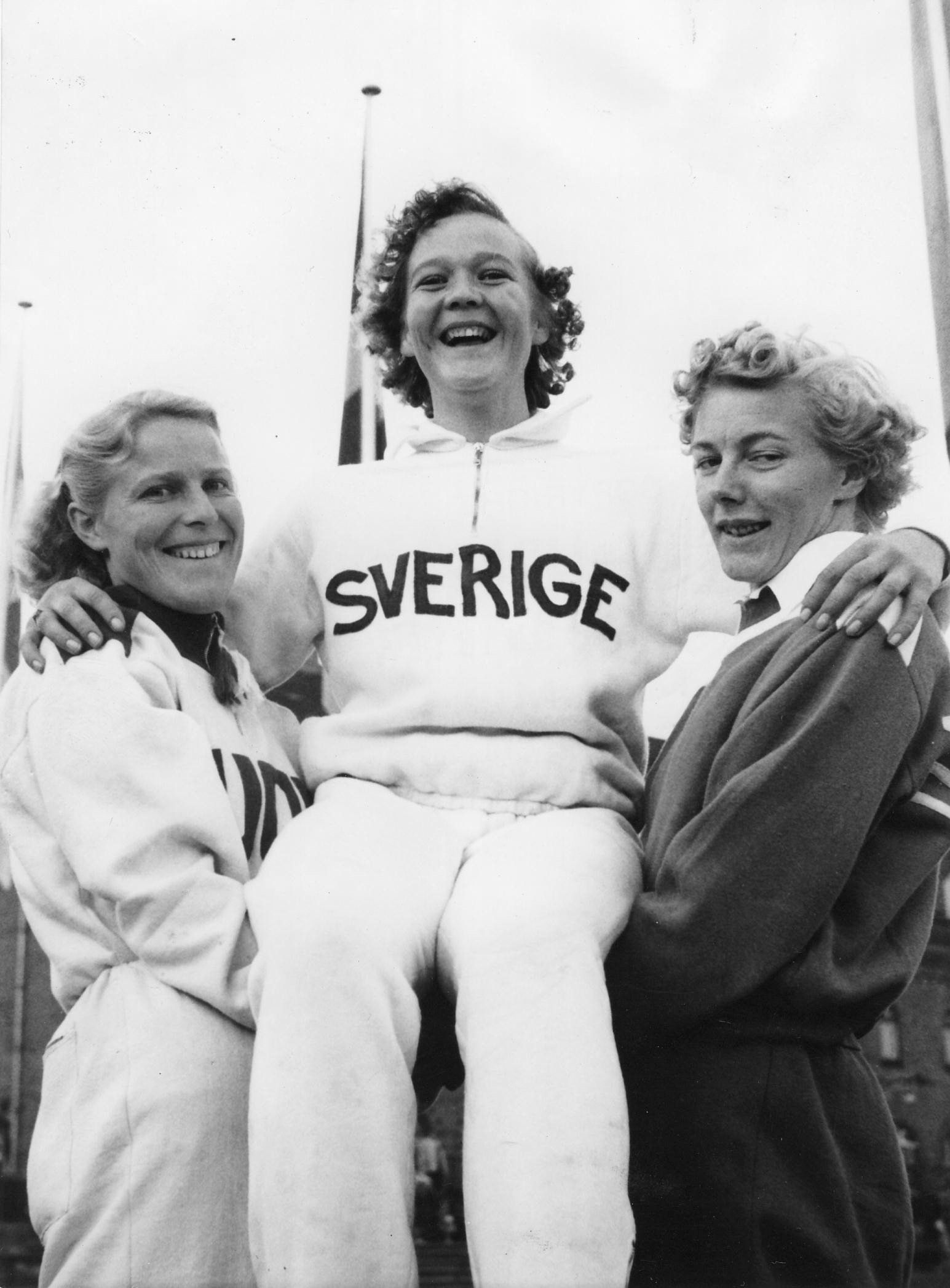
- Magnusson (center)

Personal information
- Born: 8 March 1929 Vänersborg, Sweden
- Died: 16 January 1998 (aged 68) Ed, Sweden

Sport
- Sport: Athletics
- Event(s): 100 m, long jump
- Club: Ödskölts IF

Achievements and titles
- Personal best(s): 100 m – 12.2 (1947); LJ – 5.69 m (1956)

Maja Greta Magnusson (8 March 1929 – 16 January 1998) was a Swedish athlete. She competed at the 1952 Summer Olympics in the long jump and 4 × 100 m relay, but failed to reach the finals. She finished fifth-seventh in these events at the 1946 European Athletics Championships. Magnusson won the national long jump title in 1947, 1949, 1952 and 1956.
