= Aleksandra Chudina =

Soviet track and field athlete and volleyball player

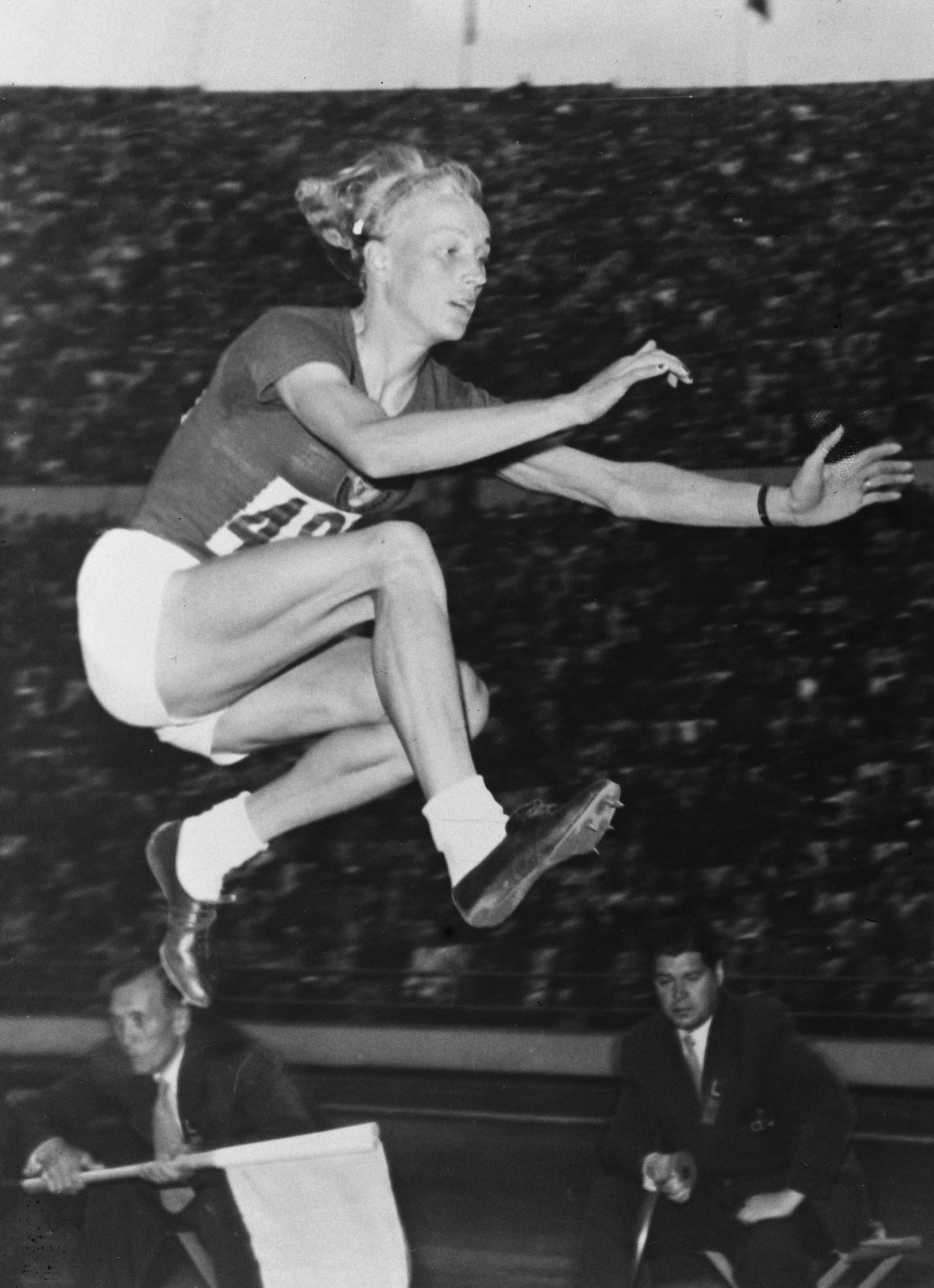
- Aleksandra Chudina at the 1952 Olympics

Personal information
- Born: 6 November 1923 Kurkinsky District, Tula Oblast, Russian SFSR, Soviet Union
- Died: 28 October 1990 (aged 66) Moscow, Russian SFSR, Soviet Union
- Height: 1.88 m (6 ft 2 in)
- Weight: 73 kg (161 lb)

Sport
- Sport: Athletics
- Club: Dynamo Moscow
Medal record
Women's athletics
Representing Soviet Union
Olympic Games
Silver medal – second place	1952 Helsinki	Long jump
Silver medal – second place	1952 Helsinki	Javelin throw
Bronze medal – third place	1952 Helsinki	High jump
European Championships
Gold medal – first place	1954 Bern	Pentathlon
Silver medal – second place	1946 Oslo	High jump
Silver medal – second place	1954 Bern	Long jump
Volleyball
World Championship
Gold medal – first place	1952 Soviet Union	Team
Gold medal – first place	1956 France	Team
Gold medal – first place	1960 Brazil	Team
European Championship
Gold medal – first place	1949 Czechoslovakia	Team
Gold medal – first place	1950 Bulgaria	Team
Gold medal – first place	1951 France	Team
Gold medal – first place	1958 Czechoslovakia	Team
Silver medal – second place	1955 Romania	Team

Aleksandra Georgievna Chudina (Russian: Александра Георгиевна Чудина; 6 November 1923 – 28 October 1990) was a Soviet athlete who excelled in field hockey, volleyball, and various track and field events.

== Field hockey ==
Chudina took a wide range of sports and excelled first in field hockey, where she started playing as a defender in 1937 and later changed to a forward. With her team Dynamo Moscow she won several major tournaments at the city and national levels between 1937 and 1947.

== Athletics ==
Chudina then changed to athletics, and had a first international success in 1946, when she finished second in the high jump at the European championships. At the 1952 Summer Olympics she won silver medals in the javelin throw and long jump and a bronze in the high jump. On 22 May 1954, she set a new world record in the high jump at 1.73 meters. The same year she won two European medals in the pentathlon and long jump, but finished only sixth in the high jump.

== Volleyball ==
Between 1947 and 1963 Chudina was also a member, and often the captain, of the Dynamo and national volleyball teams. With the national teams she won world championships in 1952, 1956 and 1960, and European championships in 1949, 1950, 1951 and 1958, finishing second in 1955.

== Personal life ==
Chudina was one of the most popular Soviet sportspersons of the 1950s, and was then used by the Soviet media as an example of superiority of the national sport programs. She was a colorful person who had a coarse low voice, enjoyed alcohol drinking and playing cards in a company, and was a careless car driver. After retiring from competitions (as she was suspected in being an Intersex person) she worked as a sports administrator and was soon forgotten. She had developed tuberculosis and lost one leg due to gangrene. A chain smoker through much of her life, she died of a stomach cancer, aged 66.
