= Hilde Nissen =

Danish sprinter (1921–2015)

Hildegard Hansen "Hilde" Nissen (6 May 1921, Frankfurt am Main – 4 November 2015, Copenhagen) was a Danish former sprinter who competed in the 1948 Summer Olympics.
