= Xenia Stad-de Jong =

Dutch sprinter

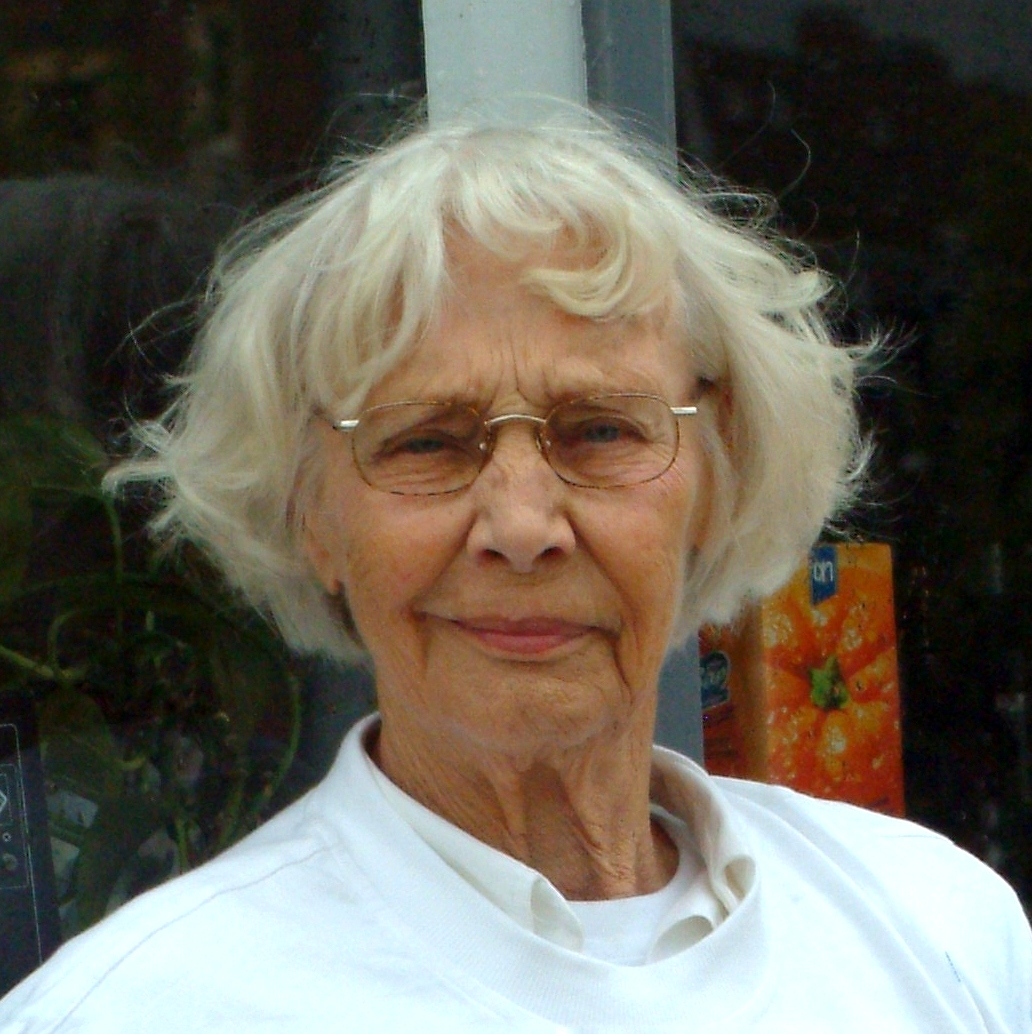
- Xenia Stad-de Jong in 2004

Personal information
- Born: Xenia de Jong; 4 March 1922 Semarang
- Died: 3 April 2012 (aged 90) Zoetermeer
- Spouse: Mike Stad
Medal record
Women's athletics
Representing the Netherlands
Olympic Games
Gold medal – first place	1948 London	4 × 100 m relay
European Championships
Silver medal – second place	1950 Brussels	4 × 100 m relay

Xenia Stad-de Jong (4 March 1922 – 3 April 2012) was a Dutch track and field athlete who competed in sprinting events.

Born in Semarang in the former Dutch East Indies (Indonesia), her greatest success was winning the gold medal as the first runner in the 4 × 100 metres relay at the 1948 Summer Olympics, together with Netty Witziers-Timmer, Gerda van der Kade-Koudijs and Fanny Blankers-Koen. She took part in the individual 100 metres event, where she was eliminated in the semi-finals.

In 1950, she won another medal with the Dutch relay team when they finished second at the 1950 European Championships. She ran in the individual 100 m at the championships as well.

Stad-de Jong died in the Dutch city of Zoetermeer in 2012, aged 90.
