= Netti Witziers-Timmer =

Dutch sprinter

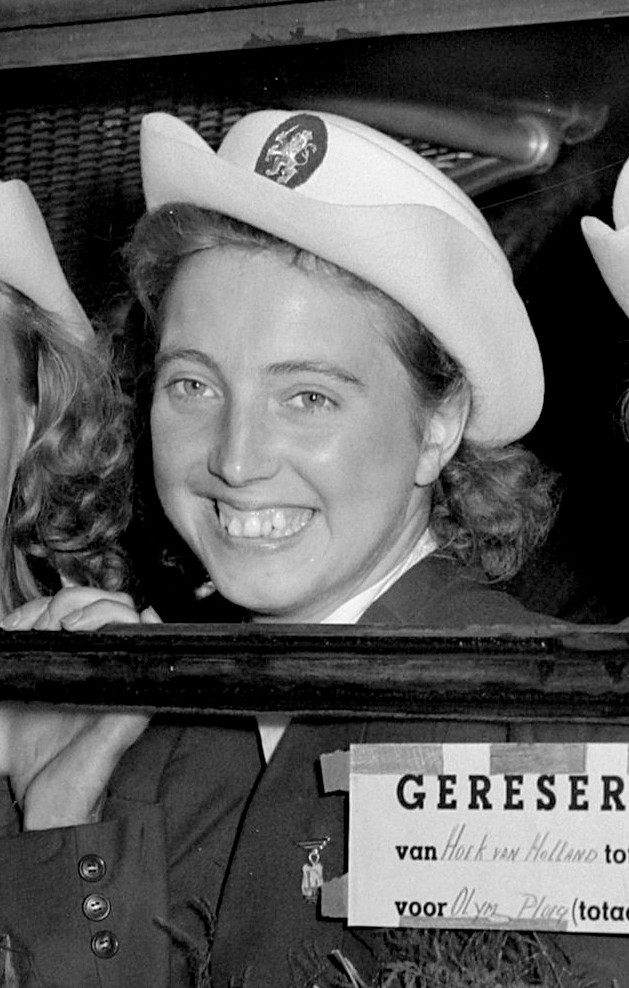
- Nettie Witziers-Timmer in 1948

Personal information
- Born: 22 July 1923 Amsterdam, the Netherlands
- Died: 25 January 2005 (aged 81) Amsterdam, the Netherlands

Sport
- Sport: Sprint running
- Club: Zeeburg, Amsterdam
Medal record
Women's athletics
Representing the Netherlands
Olympic Games
Gold medal – first place	1948 London	4 × 100 m relay
European Championships
Gold medal – first place	1946 Oslo	4 × 100 m relay

Jeannette Josephina Maria "Netti" Witziers-Timmer (née Timmer; 22 July 1923 – 25 January 2005) was a Dutch sprinter. In 1944 she was a member of the Dutch teams that set world records in the 4 × 110 yard and 4 × 200 m relays. Two years later she won a European title, and in 1948 an Olympic gold medal in the 4 × 100 m relay with Xenia Stad-de Jong, Gerda van der Kade-Koudijs, and Fanny Blankers-Koen. The 1948 Dutch relay team was remarkable (for that era) in that all its members were married and had children.

== Biography ==
Witziers-Timmer died on 25 January 2005. She was 81 at the time of her death.
