= Anne Iversen =

Danish high jumper

Personal information
- Nationality: Danish
- Born: 12 August 1923
- Died: 6 July 2015 (aged 91)

Sport
- Sport: Athletics
- Event: High jump
Medal record
Women's athletics
Representing Denmark
European Championships
Bronze medal – third place	1946 Oslo	High jump

Anne Iversen (12 August 1923 – 6 July 2015) was a Danish athlete. She competed in the women's high jump at the 1948 Summer Olympics.
