= Milly Ludwig =

Luxembourgish long jumper

Personal information
- Full name: Milena Ludwig
- Nationality: Luxembourgian
- Born: 17 February 1927
- Died: 29 June 2011 (aged 84)

Sport
- Sport: Athletics
- Event: Long jump

Milena Ludwig (17 February 1927 – 29 June 2011) was a Luxembourgish athlete. She competed in the women's long jump at the 1948 Summer Olympics.
