= Gerda van der Kade-Koudijs =

Dutch Olympic athlete (1923–2015)

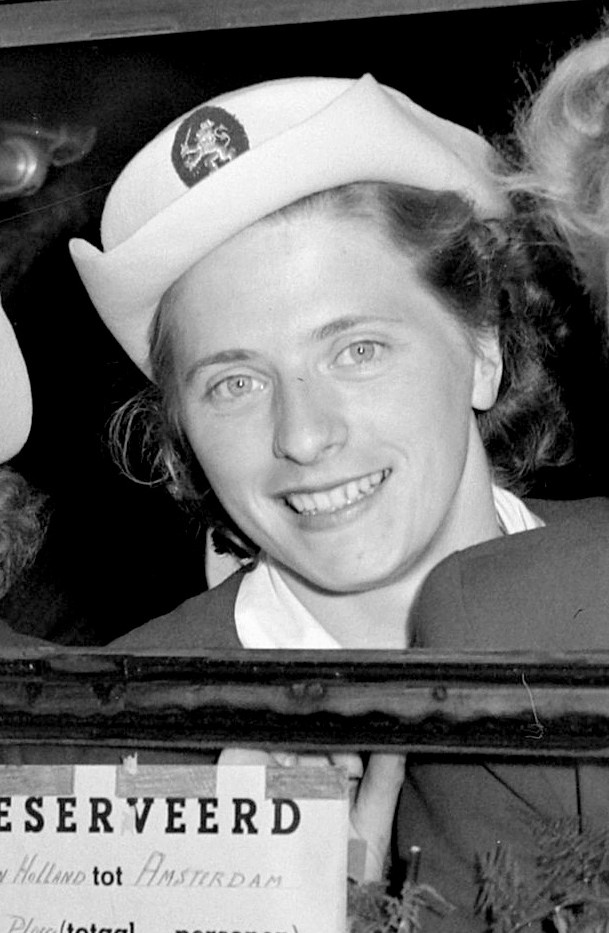
- Gerda van der Kade-Koudijs in 1948

Personal information
- Born: 29 October 1923 Rotterdam, Netherlands
- Died: 19 March 2015 (aged 91) Almelo, Netherlands

Sport
- Sport: Athletics
- Club: Victoria, Rotterdam
Medal record
Women's athletics
Representing the Netherlands
Olympic Games
| Gold medal – first place | 1948 London | 4×100 m |
European Championships
| Gold medal – first place | 1946 Oslo | 4×100 m |
| Gold medal – first place | 1946 Oslo | Long jump |

Gerda Johanna Marie van der Kade-Koudijs, née Koudijs, (29 October 1923 – 19 March 2015) was a Dutch athlete who competed at the 1948 Olympics. She won a gold medal in the 4 × 100 m relay with Xenia Stad-de Jong, Netti Witziers-Timmer, and Fanny Blankers-Koen, she finished fourth in the long jump and was eliminated in a heat of the 80 m hurdles. Two years earlier she won European titles in the 4 × 100 m relay and long jump and finished sixth in the individual 100 m race.
