= 1946 European Athletics Championships =

3rd European Athletics Championships
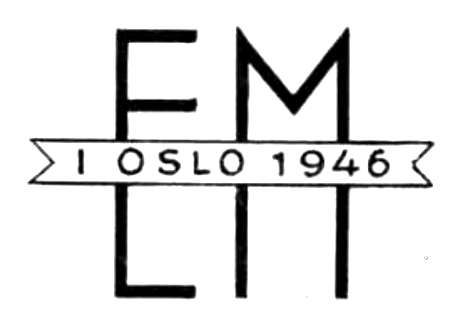
- Dates: 22 – 25 August
- Host city: Oslo, Norway
- Venue: Bislett Stadion
- Level: Senior
- Type: Outdoor
- Events: 33
- Participation: 354 athletes from 20 nations

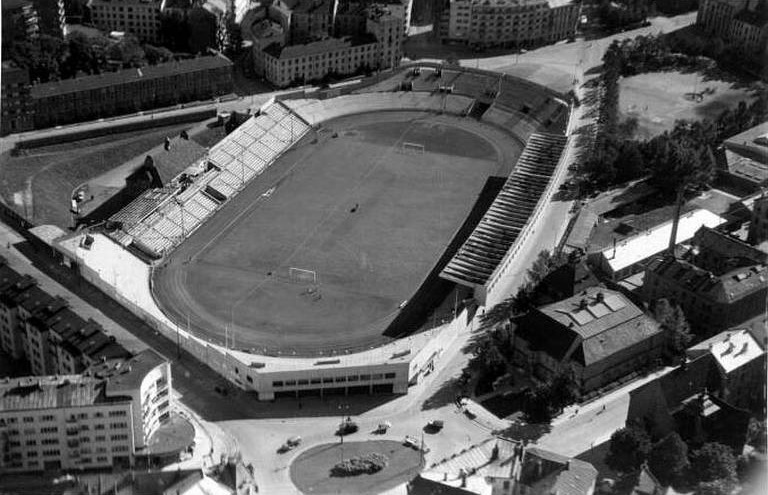
Bislett stadion in Oslo, Norway, 1948

The 3rd European Athletics Championships were held from 22 August to 25 August 1946 in the Bislett Stadion in Oslo, Norway. For the first time it was a combined event for men and women, and for the first time a city in Scandinavia hosted the championships. Contemporaneous reports on the event were given in the Glasgow Herald.

Two of the women's medalists from France underwent sex change later. Claire Brésolles became Pierre Brésolles, and Léa Caurla became Léon Caurla.

== Men's results ==
Complete results were published.

=== Track ===
Event	Gold		Silver		Bronze	
100 metres	Jack Archer (GBR)	10.6	Haakon Tranberg (NOR)	10.7	Carlo Monti (ITA)	10.8
200 metres	Nikolay Karakulov (URS)	21.6	Haakon Tranberg (NOR)	21.7	Jiří David (TCH)	21.8
400 metres	Niels Holst-Sørensen (DEN)	47.9	Jacques Lunis (FRA)	48.3	Derek Pugh (GBR)	48.9
800 metres	Rune Gustafsson (SWE)	1:51.0	Niels Holst-Sørensen (DEN)	1:51.1	Marcel Hansenne (FRA)	1:51.2
1500 metres	Lennart Strand (SWE)	3:48.0 CR	Henry Eriksson (SWE)	3:48.8	Erik Jørgensen (DEN)	3:52.8
5000 metres	Sydney Wooderson (GBR)	14:08.6 CR	Wim Slijkhuis (NED)	14:14.0	Evert Nyberg (SWE)	14:23.2
10,000 metres	Viljo Heino (FIN)	29:52.0 CR	Helge Perälä (FIN)	30:31.4	András Csaplár (HUN)	30:35.2
Marathon^{[nb]}	Mikko Hietanen (FIN)	2:24:55	Väinö Muinonen (FIN)	2:26:08	Yakov Punko (URS)	2:26:21
110 metres hurdles	Håkan Lidman (SWE)	14.6	Hippolyte Braekman (BEL)	14.9	Väinö Suvivuo (FIN)	15.0
400 metres hurdles	Bertel Storskrubb (FIN)	52.2 CR	Sixten Larsson (SWE)	52.4	Rune Larsson (SWE)	52.5
3000 metres steeplechase	Raphaël Pujazon (FRA)	9:01.4 CR	Erik Elmsäter (SWE)	9:11.0	Tore Sjöstrand (SWE)	9:14.0
10,000 metres track walk	John Mikaelsson (SWE)	46:05.2	Fritz Schwab (SUI)	47:03.6	Emile Maggi (FRA)	48:10.4
50 kilometres walk	John Ljunggren (SWE)	4:38:20 CR	Harry Forbes (GBR)	4:42:58	Charles Megnin (GBR)	4:57:04
4 × 100 metres relay	Sweden; Stig Danielsson; Inge Nilsson; Olle Laessker; Stig Håkansson	41.5	France; Agathon Lepève; Julien Lebas; Pierre Gonon; René Valmy	42.0	Czechoslovakia; Mirko Paráček; Leopold Láznička; Miroslav Řihošek; Jiří David	42.2
4 × 400 metres relay	France; Bernard Santona; Yves Cros; Robert Chef d’Hotel; Jacques Lunis	3:14.4	Great Britain; Ronald Ede; Derek Pugh; Bernard Elliot; Bill Roberts	3:14.5	Sweden; Folke Alnevik; Stig Lindgård; Sven-Erik Nolinge; Tore Sten	3:15.0

- ^{nb} The marathon at the 1946 European Championships was completed over a course measuring 40.1 km, 2 km shorter than the official marathon distance.

=== Field ===
Event	Gold		Silver		Bronze	
High jump	Anton Bolinder (SWE)	1.99	Alan Paterson (GBR)	1.96	Nils Nicklén (FIN)	1.93
Long jump	Olle Laessker (SWE)	7.42	Lucien Graff (SUI)	7.40	Miroslav Řihošek (TCH)	7.29
Pole vault	Allan Lindberg (SWE)	4.17 CR	Nikolay Ozolin (URS)	4.10	Jan Bém (TCH)	4.10
Triple jump	Valdemar Rautio (FIN)	15.17	Bertil Johnsson (SWE)	15.15	Arne Åhman (SWE)	14.96
Shot put	Gunnar Huseby (ISL)	15.56	Dmitriy Goryainov (URS)	15.25	Yrjö Lehtilä (FIN)	15.23
Discus throw	Adolfo Consolini (ITA)	53.23 CR	Giuseppe Tosi (ITA)	50.39	Veikko Nyqvist (FIN)	48.14
Javelin throw	Lennart Atterwall (SWE)	68.74	Yrjö Nikkanen (FIN)	67.50	Tapio Rautavaara (FIN)	66.40
Hammer throw	Bo Ericson (SWE)	56.44	Eric Johansson (SWE)	53.54	Duncan Clark (GBR)	51.32
Decathlon	Godtfred Holmvang (NOR)	6987 CR	Sergey Kuznetsov (URS)	6930	Göran Waxberg (SWE)	6504

== Women's results ==
=== Track ===
Event	Gold		Silver		Bronze	
100 metres	Yevgeniya Sechenova (URS)	11.9 =CR	Winifred Jordan (GBR)	12.1	Claire Brésolles (FRA)	12.2
200 metres	Yevgeniya Sechenova (URS)	25.4	Winifred Jordan (GBR)	25.6	Léa Caurla (FRA)	25.6
80 metres hurdles	Fanny Blankers-Koen (NED)	11.8	Elene Gokieli (URS)	11.9	Valentina Fokina (URS)	11.9
4 × 100 metres relay	Netherlands; Gerda van der Kade-Koudijs; Netty Witziers-Timmer; Marta Adema; Fanny Blankers-Koen	47.8	France; Léa Caurla; Anne-Marie Colchen; Claire Brésolles; Monique Drilhon	48.5	Soviet Union; Yevgeniya Sechenova; Valentina Fokina; Elene Gokieli; Valentina Vasilyeva	48.7

=== Field ===
Event	Gold		Silver		Bronze	
High jump	Anne-Marie Colchen (FRA)	1.60	Aleksandra Chudina (URS)	1.57	Anne Iversen (DEN)	1.57
Long jump	Gerda van der Kade-Koudijs (NED)	5.67	Lidija Gaile (URS)	5.67	Valentina Vasilyeva (URS)	5.63
Shot put	Tatyana Sevryukova (URS)	14.16 CR	Micheline Ostermeyer (FRA)	12.84	Amelia Piccinini (ITA)	12.21
Discus throw	Nina Dumbadze (URS)	44.21	Ann Niesink (NED)	40.46	Jadwiga Wajs (POL)	39.37
Javelin throw	Klavdiya Mayuchaya (URS)	46.25 CR	Lyudmila Anokhina (URS)	45.84	Johanna Koning (NED)	43.24

== Medal table ==
Rank	Nation	Gold	Silver	Bronze	Total
1	Sweden (SWE)	11	5	6	22
2	Soviet Union (URS)	6	7	4	17
3	Finland (FIN)	4	3	5	12
4	France (FRA)	3	4	4	11
5	Netherlands (NED)	3	2	1	6
6	Great Britain (GBR)	2	5	3	10
7	Norway (NOR)	1	2	0	3
8	Denmark (DEN)	1	1	2	4
8	Italy (ITA)	1	1	2	4
10	Iceland (ISL)	1	0	0	1
11	Switzerland (SUI)	0	2	0	2
12	Belgium (BEL)	0	1	0	1
13	Czechoslovakia (TCH)	0	0	4	4
14	Hungary (HUN)	0	0	1	1
14	Poland (POL)	0	0	1	1
Totals (15 entries)		33	33	33	99

== Participation ==
According to an unofficial count, 354 athletes from 20 countries participated in the event, one athlete more than the official number of 353 as published.

- Belgium (11)
- Czechoslovakia (29)
- Denmark (23)
- Finland (20)
- France (31)
- Great Britain (24)
- Greece (5)
- Hungary (11)
- Iceland (10)
- Ireland (1)
- Italy (15)
- Liechtenstein (2)
- Luxembourg (5)
- Netherlands (17)
- Norway (38)
- Poland (18)
- Soviet Union (19)
- Sweden (54)
- Switzerland (14)
- Yugoslavia (7)
