= Italy at the 2018 European Athletics Championships =

- WA code: ITA

in (Germany) Berlin 6 August 2018 – 12 August 2018
- Competitors: 91 (51 men, 40 women)
- Medals Ranked 19th: Gold 0 Silver 1 Bronze 3 Total 4

European Athletics Championships appearances (overview)
- 1934; 1938; 1946; 1950; 1954; 1958; 1962; 1966; 1969; 1971; 1974; 1978; 1982; 1986; 1990; 1994; 1998; 2002; 2006; 2010; 2012; 2014; 2016; 2018; 2022; 2024

Italy competed at the 2018 European Athletics Championships in Berlin, Germany, from 6 to 12 August 2018.

== Medals ==
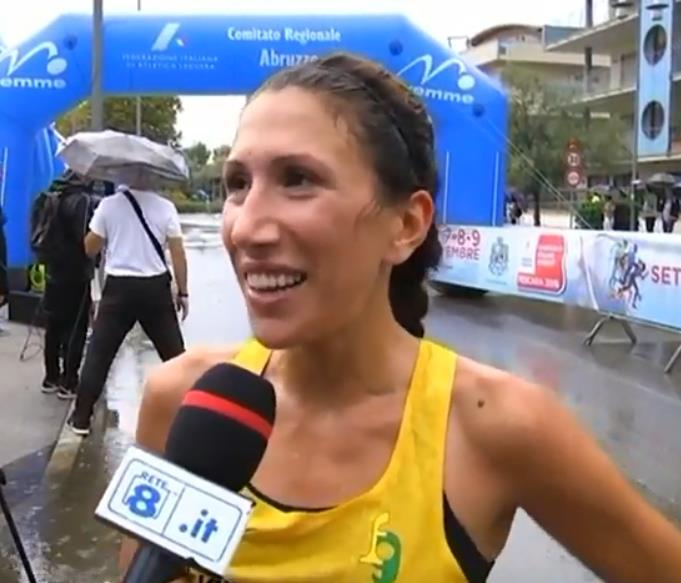
Antonella Palmisano silver medal in the 20 km race walk.

Although in April 2018, before this European Championship race in Berlin 2018, which actually took place on August 11, the Disciplinary Commission of the Czech Athletics Association (CAS) had notified the czech athlete Anežka Drahotová of an irregularity in her biological passport (doping), on 19 July 2021 (three years later), the athlete was cleared and the silver medal she won on the field was reassigned, as also confirmed by the Statistic Handbook published by the EAA on the eve of Roma 2024.

But the situation that seemed to be over took a further turn on 15 May 2025, therefore after the publication of the EAA Statistical Handbook of Rome 2024, when WADA's appeal against the acquittal ruling of July 2021 was accepted and at this point the EAA rewrote the competition rankings, once again excluding Drahotova from the rankings.

| Medal | Date | Event | Athlete |
|---|---|---|---|
| Bronze | 7 August | Men's 10,000 m | Yeman Crippa |
| Bronze | 9 August | Men's 3000 m steeplechase | Yohanes Chiappinelli |
| Silver | 11 August | Women's 20 km walk | Antonella Palmisano |
| Bronze | 12 August | Men's marathon | Yassine Rachik |

Marathon team

The medals won by the marathon team (gold for the men's team and silver for the women's team) at that edition of the championships were not yet counted in the medal table

| Medal | Date | Event | Athlete |
|---|---|---|---|
| Silver | 12 August | Women's Marathon Cup | Sara Dossena; Catherine Bertone; Fatna Maraoui; Laura Gotti |
| Gold | 12 August | Men's Marathon Cup | Yassine Rachik; Eyob Faniel; Stefano La Rosa |

== Finalists ==
Italy national athletics team ranked 14th in the EAA placing table. Rank obtained by assigning eight points in the first place and so on to the eight finalists (20 athletes or team).

| Rank | Country | 1st place, gold medalist(s) | 2nd place, silver medalist(s) | 3rd place, bronze medalist(s) | 4 | 5 | 6 | 7 | 8 | Pts |
|---|---|---|---|---|---|---|---|---|---|---|
| 6 | Italy | 1 | 1 | 4 | 3 | 5 | 3 | 1 | 2 | 87 |

== Selected athletes ==
On 24 April 2018 the technical commissioner of the high level of the Italian national team Elio Locatelli, illustrated the composition of the national marathon team, and FIDAL has announced the names of the athletes already selected for the race walk team for the European Championships 2018.

| Event | Men | Women |
|---|---|---|
| Marathon | ~~Daniele Meucci~~; Stefano La Rosa; Eyob Faniel; Yassine Rachik | Catherine Bertone; Sara Dossena; ~~Valeria Straneo~~; ~~Giovanna Epis~~; Fatna Maraoui; Laura Gotti; Anna Incerti (reserve) |
| Race walk | Marco De Luca | Antonella Palmisano |

== Team ==
On 19 July 2018, the complete team was announced: 49 men, 40 women, the largest team since the 95 athletes of Munich 2002. It remains to select a seventh athlete for the men's 4 × 400 m relay. On 27 July 2018 the selection of three other male athletes was announced, the total therefore reaches 92 (52 men and 40 women).

Italy closes with 4 medalists, 18 finalists (excluding teams), and 9 first of those not admitted to the final.

Finalists top 8 (4 athletes)
Finalists - out o top 8: in middle-distance races or field events (18 athletes)
First of the not admitted to the final (9 athletes)

=== Men ===
| Event | Athlete | Result |
|---|---|---|
| 100 m | Filippo Tortu | 5th |
| 100 m | Marcel Jacobs | SF (11th) |
| 100 m | Federico Cattaneo | SF (20th) |
| 200 m | Eseosa Desalu | 6th |
| 200 m | Andrew Howe | SF (17th) |
| 200 m | Davide Manenti | SF (19th) |
| 4 × 100 m relay | Federico Cattaneo | SF (DSQ) |
| 4 × 100 m relay | Eseosa Desalu | SF (DSQ) |
| 4 × 100 m relay | Davide Manenti | SF (DSQ) |
| 4 × 100 m relay | Filippo Tortu | SF (DSQ) |
| 4 × 100 m relay | Roberto Rigali (reserve) | |
| 400 m | Matteo Galvan | SF (9th) |
| 400 m | Davide Re | SF (14th) |
| 4 × 400 m relay | Vladimir Aceti | 6th |
| 4 × 400 m relay | Matteo Galvan | 6th |
| 4 × 400 m relay | Davide Re | 6th |
| 4 × 400 m relay | Edoardo Scotti | 6th |
| 4 × 400 m relay | Michele Tricca | 6th |
| 4 × 400 m relay | Mattia Casarico (reserve) | |
| 4 × 400 m relay | Daniele Corsa (reserve) | |
| 4 × 400 m relay | Francesco Cappellin (reserve) | |
| 800 m | Simone Barontini | SF (24th) |
| 1500 m | Mohad Abdikadar | 10th |
| 1500 m | Joao Bussotti | 11th |
| 5.000 m | Yemaneberhan Crippa | 4th |
| 10,000 m | Yemaneberhan Crippa | 3rd place, bronze medalist(s) |
| 10,000 m | Lorenzo Dini | 13th |
| 110 m hs | Lorenzo Perini | SF (10th) |
| 110 m hs | Hassane Fofana | SF (11th) |
| 110 m hs | Paolo Dal Molin | SF (18th) |
| 400 m hs | Lorenzo Vergani | SF (12th) |
| 400 m hs | José Bencosme | SF (16th) |
| 400 m hs | ~~Mario Lambrughi~~ | DNS |
| 3000 m st | Yohannes Chiappinelli | 3rd place, bronze medalist(s) |
| 3000 m st | Ahmed Abdelwahed | 13th |
| 3000 m st | Osama Zoghlami | SF (21st) |
| High Jump | Gianmarco Tamberi | 4th |
| High Jump | Marco Fassinotti | Qual (13th) |
| Long jump | Kevin Ojiaku | 11th |
| Triple Jump | Simone Forte | Qual (13th) |
| Triple Jump | Fabrizio Donato | Qual (20th) |
| Pole vault | Claudio Stecchi | 11th |
| Shot put | Leonardo Fabbri | Qual (29th) |
| Discus throw | Hannes Kirchler | Qual (18th) |
| Discus throw | Giovanni Faloci | Qual (21st) |
| Discus throw | Nazzareno Di Marco | Qual (23rd) |
| Hammer throw | Marco Lingua | Qual (13th) |
| Hammer throw | Simone Falloni | Qual (21st) |
| Javelin throw | Roberto Bertolini | Qual (26th) |
| Marathon | Yassine Rachik | 3rd place, bronze medalist(s) |
| Marathon | Eyob Faniel | 5th |
| Marathon | Stefano La Rosa | 12th |
| Race walk 20 km | Massimo Stano | 4th |
| Race walk 20 km | Francesco Fortunato | 16th |
| Race walk 20 km | Giorgio Rubino | DSQ |
| Race walk 50 km | Marco De Luca | 10th |
| Race walk 50 km | Andrea Agrusti | 11th |
| Race walk 50 km | Michele Antonelli | DNF |
| Decathlon | Simone Cairoli | 10th |

=== Women ===
| Event | Athlete | Result |
|---|---|---|
| 100 m | Irene Siragusa | SF (23rd) |
| 100 m | Anna Bongiorni | SF (24th) |
| 200 m | Irene Siragusa | SF (15th) |
| 200 m | Gloria Hooper | SF (18th) |
| 4 × 100 m relay | Audrey Alloh | 7th |
| 4 × 100 m relay | Johanelis Herrera Abreu | 7th |
| 4 × 100 m relay | Gloria Hooper | 7th |
| 4 × 100 m relay | Irene Siragusa | 7th |
| 4 × 100 m relay | Anna Bongiorni | INJ |
| 4 × 100 m relay | Jessica Paoletta (reserve) | |
| 400 m | Libania Grenot | SF (9th) |
| 400 m | Maria Benedicta Chigbolu | SF (19th) |
| 4 × 400 m relay | Maria Benedicta Chigbolu | 5th |
| 4 × 400 m relay | Libania Grenot | 5th |
| 4 × 400 m relay | Ayomide Folorunso | 5th |
| 4 × 400 m relay | Raphaela Lukudo | 5th |
| 4 × 400 m relay | Maria Enrica Spacca (reserve) | |
| 4 × 400 m relay | Giancarla Trevisan (reserve) | |
| 4 × 400 m relay | Elisabetta Vandi (reserve) | |
| 800 m | Elena Bellò | Heat (27th) |
| 800 m | Yusneysi Santiusti | Heat (31st) |
| 100 m hs | Luminosa Bogliolo | SF (15th) |
| 100 m hs | Elisa Maria Di Lazzaro | Heat (28th) |
| 400 m hs | Yadisleidy Pedroso | 5th |
| 400 m hs | Ayomide Folorunso | SF (9th) |
| 400 m hs | Linda Olivieri | Heat (31st) |
| 3000 m st | Isabel Mattuzzi | 15th |
| 3000 m st | Martina Merlo | SF (16th) |
| 3000 m st | Francesca Bertoni | SF (22nd) |
| High Jump | Alessia Trost | 8th |
| High Jump | Elena Vallortigara | Qual (13th) |
| High Jump | Desirée Rossit | Qual (18th) |
| Long Jump | Laura Strati | Qual (13th) |
| Triple Jump | Ottavia Cestonaro | Qual (NM) |
| Triple Jump | Dariya Derkach | Qual (NM) |
| Discus throw | Daisy Osakue | 5th |
| Discus throw | Valentina Aniballi | Qual (17th) |
| Marathon | Sara Dossena | 6th |
| Marathon | Catherine Bertone | 8th |
| Marathon | Fatna Maraoui | 14th |
| Marathon | Laura Gotti | 46th |
| Marathon | ~~Giovanna Epis~~ | DNS |
| Race walk 20 km | Antonella Palmisano | 3rd place, bronze medalist(s) |
| Race walk 20 km | Valentina Trapletti | 9th |
| Race walk 20 km | Eleonora Giorgi | DSQ |
| Race walk 50 km | Mariavittoria Becchetti | 10th |
| Race walk 50 km | Nicole Colombi | DNS |

== See also ==
- Italy national athletics team
- Italy at the 2018 European Championships
