= Italy at the 2022 European Athletics Championships =

Italy team at athletics event

- WA code: ITA

in (Germany) Munich 15 August 2022 – 21 August 2022
- Competitors: 98 (53 men, 45 women) in 44/50 events
- Medals Ranked 7th: Gold 3 Silver 2 Bronze 6 Total 11

European Athletics Championships appearances (overview)
- 1934; 1938; 1946; 1950; 1954; 1958; 1962; 1966; 1969; 1971; 1974; 1978; 1982; 1986; 1990; 1994; 1998; 2002; 2006; 2010; 2012; 2014; 2016; 2018; 2022; 2024

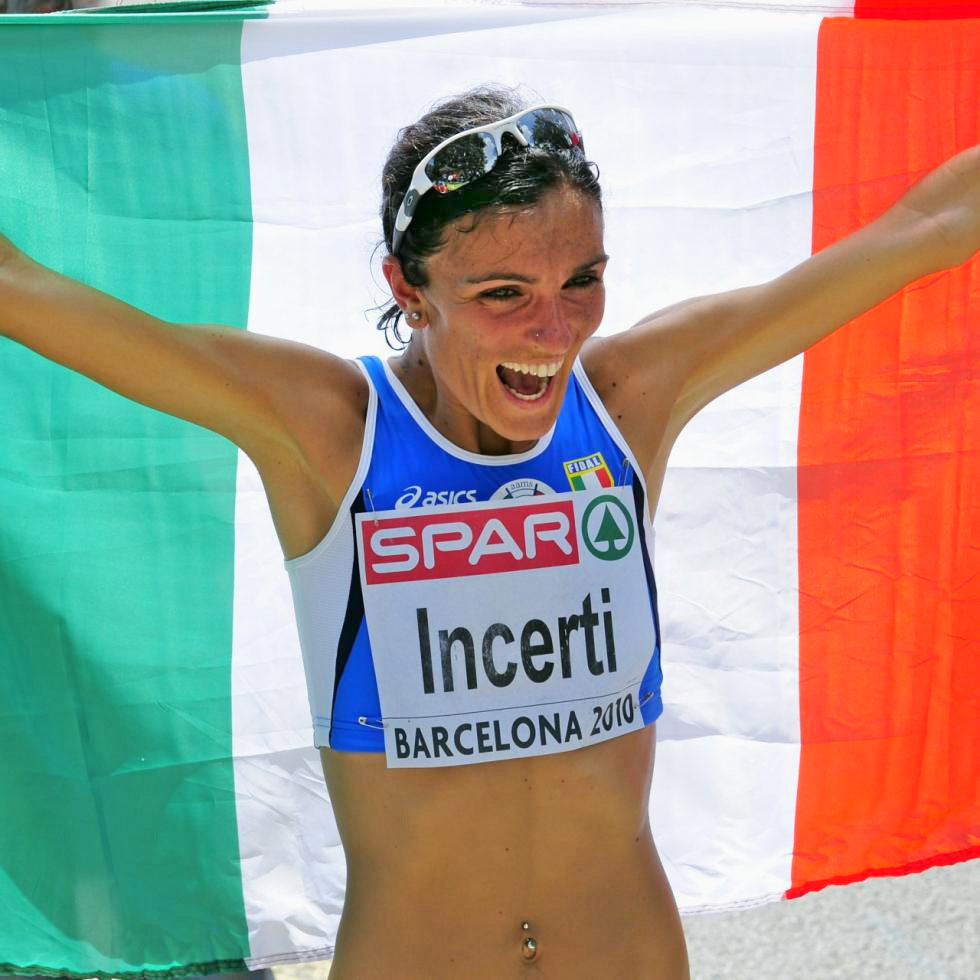
Anna Incerti, 42 years old, gold medal at Barcelona 2010 in marathon.

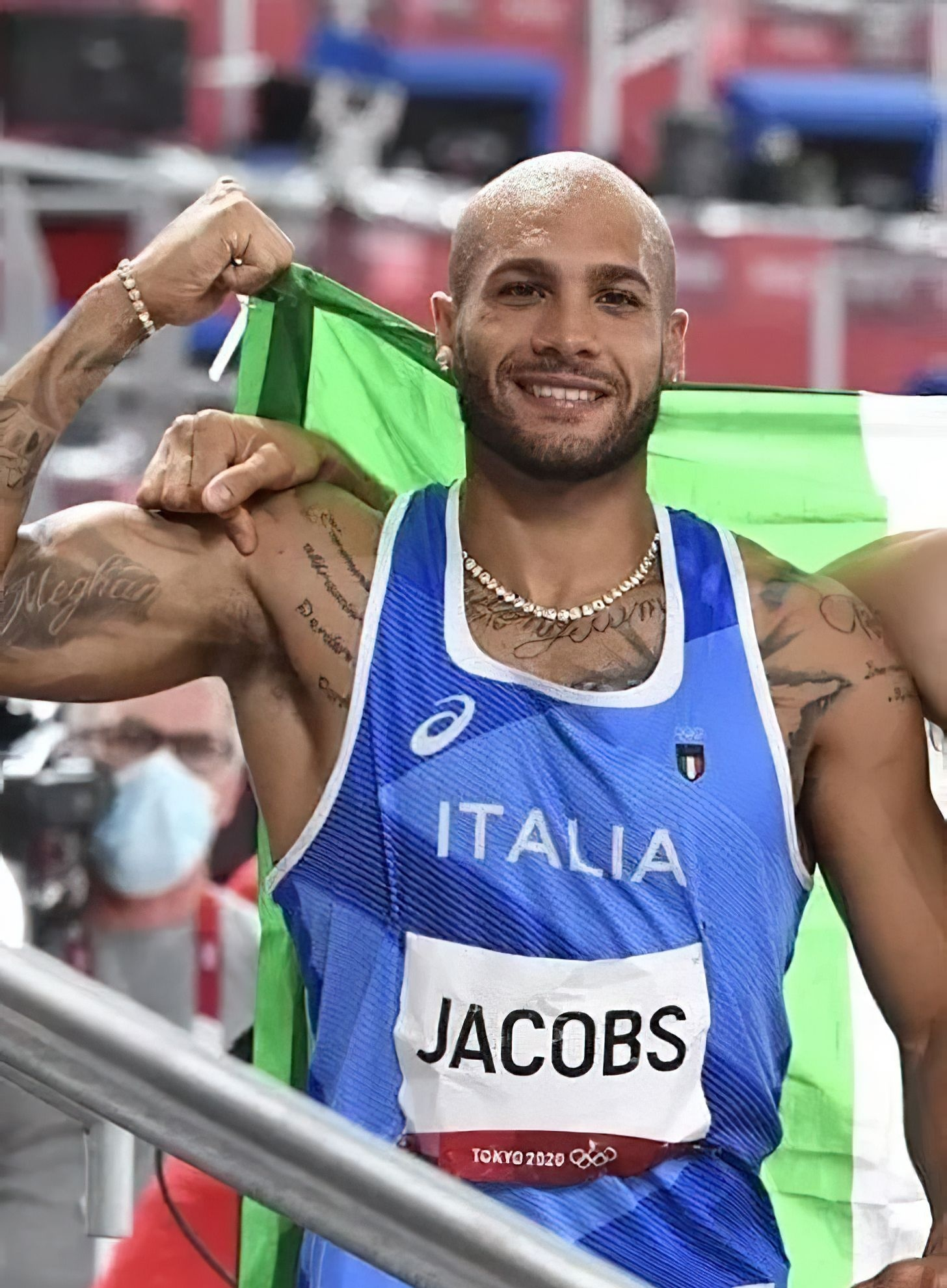
Jacobs, after gold at the 2021 Olympics and 2022 World Indoor Championships, gold also at the European.

Italy competed at the 2022 European Athletics Championships in Munich, Germany, from 15 to 21 August 2022.

== Medals ==
Medal	Athlete	Event	Date
1st place, gold medalist(s)	Marcell Jacobs	Men's 100 m	16 August
1st place, gold medalist(s)	Gianmarco Tamberi	Men's high jump	18 August
1st place, gold medalist(s)	Yeman Crippa	Men's 10,000 m	21 August
2nd place, silver medalist(s)	Andrea Dallavalle	Men's triple jump	17 August
2nd place, silver medalist(s)	Ahmed Abdelwahed	Men's 3000 m steeplechase	19 August
3rd place, bronze medalist(s)	Matteo Giupponi	Men's 35 km racewalk	16 August
3rd place, bronze medalist(s)	Yeman Crippa	Men's 5000 m	16 August
3rd place, bronze medalist(s)	Sara Fantini	Women's hammer throw	17 August
3rd place, bronze medalist(s)	Osama Zoghlami	Men's 3000 m steeplechase	19 August
3rd place, bronze medalist(s)	Filippo Tortu	Men's 200 m	19 August
3rd place, bronze medalist(s)	Zaynab Dosso; Gloria Hooper (Note: She ran semifinals); Anna Bongiorni; Alessia Pavese; Dalia Kaddari	Women's 4 × 100 m relay	21 August

== Finalists ==
Italy national athletics team in the EAA placing table (rank obtained by assigning eight points in the first place and so on to the eight finalists). It is the best placing ever by an Italian team.

Rank	Country	1st place, gold medalist(s)	2nd place, silver medalist(s)	3rd place, bronze medalist(s)	4	5	6	7	8	Pts
3rd	Italy	3	2	6	4	6	2	8	3	142.5

== Team ==
On 3 August 2022, the technical commissioner of the Italian national team Antonio La Torre issued the list of the athletes called up for the Munich European Championships, 101 athletes (54 men and 47 women).

This is the list of selected athletes. It should be considered that the athletes not registered in the individual sprint event could only be reserve in the relay race and therefore will not participate in the continental competition. Just as some athletes still injured shortly before the start of the competition may not participate, such as 100 m Olympic champion Marcell Jacobs.

On 11 August, just four days before the start of the competition, three Italian athletes were forced to give up for their injury.

Legend

Athletes who defected before the start of the competition
Top eight

=== Men ===
Event	Athlete	Result
Sprint events
100 m	Chituru Ali	8
100 m	Marcell Jacobs	1st place, gold medalist(s)
200 m	Fausto Desalu	SF
200 m	Diego Pettorossi	SF
200 m	Filippo Tortu	3rd place, bronze medalist(s)
4 × 100 m relay	Chituru Ali	Heat
4 × 100 m relay	Matteo Melluzzo	Heat
4 × 100 m relay	Lorenzo Patta	Heat
4 × 100 m relay	Hilary Polanco Rijo	Heat
4 × 100 m relay	Marcell Jacobs	Athletes not employed
4 × 100 m relay	Fausto Desalu	Athletes not employed
4 × 100 m relay	Diego Pettorossi	Athletes not employed
4 × 100 m relay	Filippo Tortu	Athletes not employed
400 m	Lorenzo Benati	Heat
400 m	Davide Re	SF
400 m	Edoardo Scotti	SF
4 × 400 m relay	Lorenzo Benati (Note: He ran in heats.)	8
4 × 400 m relay	Davide Re	8
4 × 400 m relay	Edoardo Scotti	8
4 × 400 m relay	Vladimir Aceti	8
4 × 400 m relay	Brayan Lopez	8
4 × 400 m relay	Pietro Pivotto	8
4 × 400 m relay	Matteo Raimondi	Athletes not employed
4 × 400 m relay	Lapo Bianciardi	Athletes not employed
Middle and long-distance events
800 m	Simone Barontini	
800 m	Catalin Tecuceanu	Heat
1500 m	Pietro Arese	4
1500 m	Ossama Meslek	Heat
5000 m	Yeman Crippa	3rd place, bronze medalist(s)
5000 m	Pietro Riva	13
10000 m	Yeman Crippa	1st place, gold medalist(s)
10000 m	Pietro Riva	5
3000 m steeplechase	Ahmed Abdelwahed	3rd place, bronze medalist(s)
3000 m steeplechase	Ala Zoghlami	2nd place, silver medalist(s)
3000 m steeplechase	Osama Zoghlami	7
Hurdles events
110 m hs	Hassane Fofana	SF
110 m hs	Lorenzo Simonelli	Heat
400 m hs	José Bencosme	SF
400 m hs	Giacomo Bertoncelli	Heat
400 m hs	Mario Lambrughi	SF
Field and combined events
High jump	Marco Fassinotti	9
High jump	Gianmarco Tamberi	1st place, gold medalist(s)
High jump	Christian Falocchi	Qual
Pole vault	Max Mandusic	Qual
Long jump	Filippo Randazzo	DNS
Triple jump	Tobia Bocchi	4
Triple jump	Andrea Dallavalle	2nd place, silver medalist(s)
Triple jump	Emanuel Ihemeje	9
Shot put	Sebastiano Bianchetti	Qual
Shot put	Leonardo Fabbri	7
Shot put	Nick Ponzio	4
Javelin throw	Roberto Orlando	Qual
Decathlon	Dario Dester	6
Road events
Marathon	Iliass Aouani	19
Marathon	René Cunéaz	22
Marathon	Daniele D'Onofrio	DNF
Marathon	Stefano La Rosa	33
Marathon	Daniele Meucci	13
20 km racewalk	Andrea Cosi	10
20 km racewalk	Francesco Fortunato	5
20 km racewalk	Massimo Stano	8
35 km racewalk	Massimo Stano	DNS
35 km racewalk	Michele Antonelli	DSQ
35 km racewalk	Teodorico Caporaso	DNS
35 km racewalk	Matteo Giupponi	3rd place, bronze medalist(s)

=== Women ===
Event	Athlete	Result
Sprint events
100 m	Zaynab Dosso	7
100 m	Gloria Hooper	Heat
100 m	Irene Siragusa	SF
200 m	Vittoria Fontana	Heat
200 m	Dalia Kaddari	7
200 m	Irene Siragusa	SF
4 × 100 m relay	Zaynab Dosso	3rd place, bronze medalist(s)
4 × 100 m relay	Gloria Hooper	3rd place, bronze medalist(s)
4 × 100 m relay	Anna Bongiorni	3rd place, bronze medalist(s)
4 × 100 m relay	Alessia Pavese	3rd place, bronze medalist(s)
4 × 100 m relay	Dalia Kaddari	3rd place, bronze medalist(s)
4 × 100 m relay	Irene Siragusa	Athletes not employed
4 × 100 m relay	Vittoria Fontana	Athletes not employed
4 × 100 m relay	Johanelis Herrera	Athletes not employed
400 m	Alice Mangione	SF
400 m	Anna Polinari	Heat
400 m	Virginia Troiani	Heat
4 × 400 m relay	Alice Mangione	Heat
4 × 400 m relay	Anna Polinari	Heat
4 × 400 m relay	Virginia Troiani	Heat
4 × 400 m relay	Raphaela Lukudo	Heat
4 × 400 m relay	Ayomide Folorunso	Athletes not employed
4 × 400 m relay	Alessandra Bonora	Athletes not employed
4 × 400 m relay	Rebecca Borga	Athletes not employed
4 × 400 m relay	Mariabenedicta Chigbolu	Athletes not employed
Middle and long-distance events
800 m	Elena Bellò	SF
800 m	Eloisa Coiro	Heat
1500 m	Gaia Sabbatini	9
1500 m	Ludovica Cavalli	12
1500 m	Federica Del Buono	Heat
5000 m	Nadia Battocletti	7
10000 m	Anna Arnaudo	DNS
3000 m steeplechase	Laura Della Montà	Heat
3000 m steeplechase	Martina Merlo	Heat
Hurdles events
110 m hs	Luminosa Bogliolo	DNS
110 m hs	Elisa Di Lazzaro	SF
110 m hs	Nicla Mosetti	Heat
400 m hs	Ayomide Folorunso	7
400 m hs	Linda Olivieri	Heat
400 m hs	Rebecca Sartori	SF
Field and combined events
High jump	Erika Furlani	Qual
High jump	Elena Vallortigara	9
Pole vault	Roberta Bruni	7
Pole vault	Elisa Molinarolo	Qual
Long jump	Larissa Iapichino	5
Triple jump	Ottavia Cestonaro	10
Triple jump	Dariya Derkach	Qual
Discus throw	Daisy Osakue	Qual
Discus throw	Stefania Strumillo	Qual
Hammer throw	Sara Fantini	3rd place, bronze medalist(s)
Heptathlon	Sveva Gerevini	11
Road events
Marathon	Giovanna Epis	5
Marathon	Anna Incerti	42
20 km racewalk	Valentina Trapletti	5
35 km racewalk	Lidia Barcella	6
35 km racewalk	Nicole Colombi	DNS
35 km racewalk	Federica Curiazzi	4

== See also ==
- Italy national athletics team
- Italy at the 2022 World Athletics Championships
- Italy at the 2022 European Championships
