= Italy at the 1946 European Athletics Championships =

- WA code: ITA

in (Norway) Oslo 22 August 1946 – 25 August 1946
- Medals Ranked 8th: Gold 1 Silver 1 Bronze 2 Total 4

European Athletics Championships appearances (overview)
- 1934; 1938; 1946; 1950; 1954; 1958; 1962; 1966; 1969; 1971; 1974; 1978; 1982; 1986; 1990; 1994; 1998; 2002; 2006; 2010; 2012; 2014; 2016; 2018; 2022; 2024

Italy competed at the 1946 European Athletics Championships in Oslo, Norway, from 22 to 25 August 1946.

== Medalists ==
Medal	Athlete	Event
1st place, gold medalist(s)	Adolfo Consolini	Discus throw
2nd place, silver medalist(s)	Giuseppe Tosi	Discus throw
3rd place, bronze medalist(s)	Carlo Monti	100 m
3rd place, bronze medalist(s)	Amelia Piccinini	Shot put

== Top eight ==
=== Men ===
Athlete	100 m	200 m	400 m	800 m	1500 m	5000 m	10,000 m	110 m hs	400 m hs	3000 m st	4×100 m relay	4×400 m relay	Marathon	50 km walk	High jump	Pole vault	Long jump	Triple jump	Shot put	Discus throw	Hammer throw	Javelin throw	Decathlon
Carlo Monti	3rd place, bronze medalist(s)	7																					
Relay team Michele Tito; Giusto Cattoni; Carlo Manara; Carlo Monti											7												
Alfredo Campagner															6								
Egidio Pribetti																4							
Adolfo Consolini																				1st place, gold medalist(s)			
Giuseppe Tosi																				2nd place, silver medalist(s)			
Teseo Taddia																					6		

=== Women ===
Athlete	100 m	200 m	80 m hs	4×100 m relay	High jump	Long jump	Shot put	Discus throw	Javelin throw
Amelia Piccinini						4	3rd place, bronze medalist(s)		

== See also ==
- Italy national athletics team
