= Italy at the 2016 European Athletics Championships =

- WA code: ITA
- National federation: FIDAL
- Website: www.fidal.it

in Amsterdam
- Competitors: 74 (41 men and 33 women) in 35 events
- Medals Ranked 7th: Gold 2 Silver 2 Bronze 3 Total 7

European Athletics Championships appearances (overview)
- 1934; 1938; 1946; 1950; 1954; 1958; 1962; 1966; 1969; 1971; 1974; 1978; 1982; 1986; 1990; 1994; 1998; 2002; 2006; 2010; 2012; 2014; 2016; 2018; 2022; 2024; 2026

Italy competed at the 2016 European Athletics Championships in Amsterdam, Netherlands, between 6 and 10 July 2016. A delegation of 74 athletes was sent to represent the country.

== Medals ==
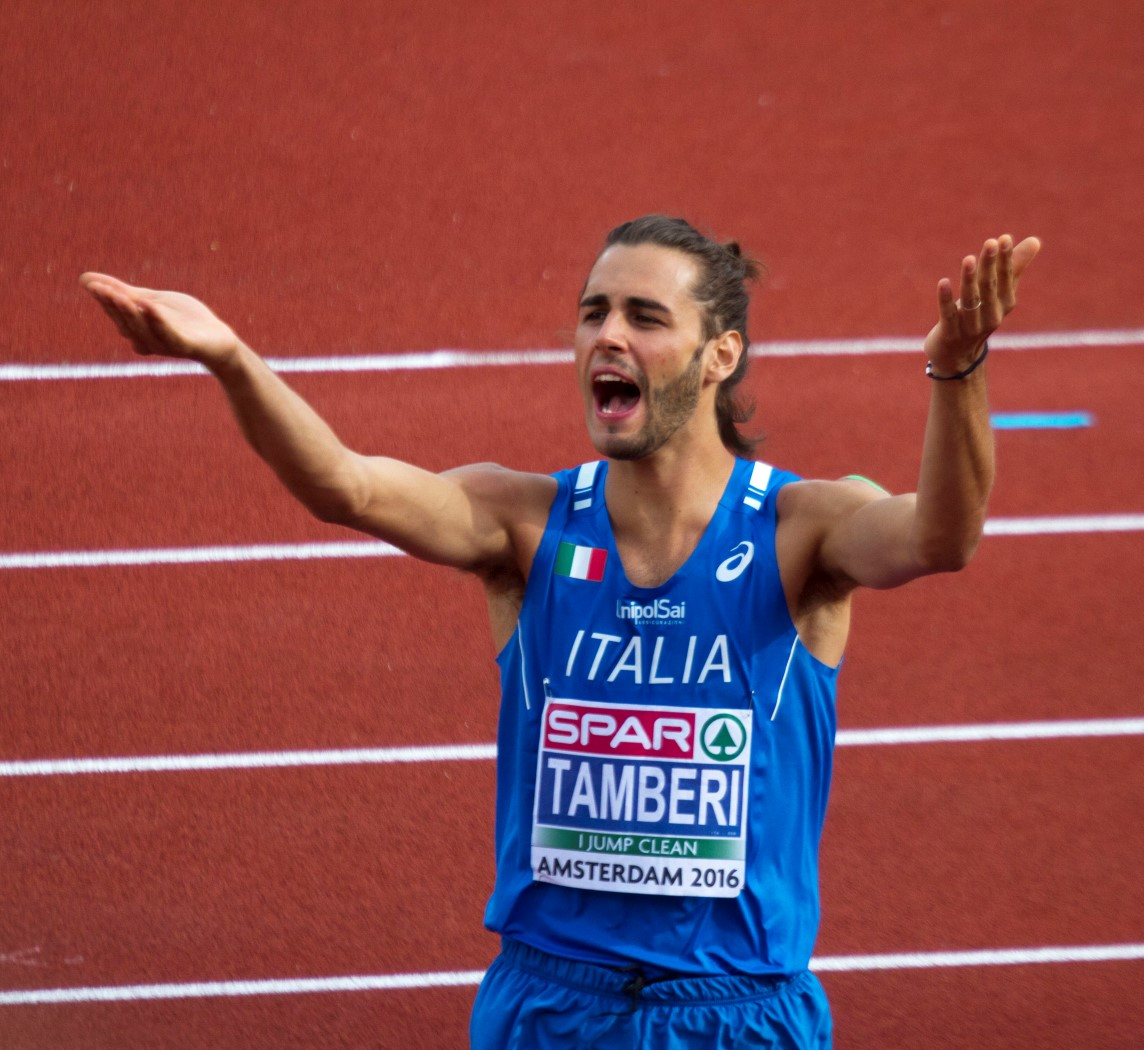
Gianmarco Tamberi gold medal in the high jump.

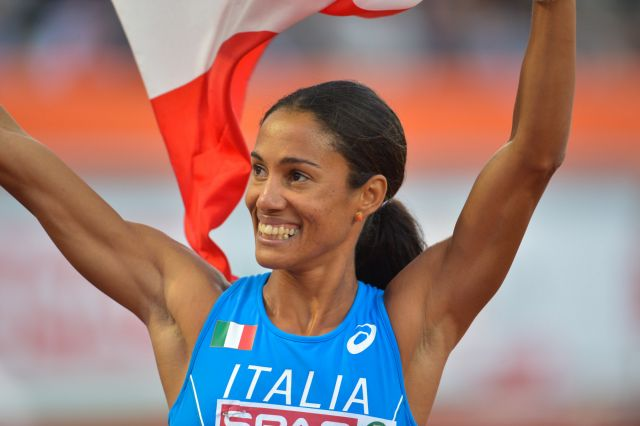
Libania Grenot gold medal in the 400 m.

Medal	Athlete	Event	Date
Gold	Libania Grenot	Women's 400 metres	8 July
Gold	Gianmarco Tamberi	Men's high jump	10 July
Silver	Veronica Inglese	Women's half marathon	10 July
Silver	Italian team Veronica Inglese; Anna Incerti; Rosaria Console; Laila Soufyane; Catherine Bertone	Women's half marathon	10 July
Bronze	Daniele Meucci	Men's half marathon	10 July
Bronze	Italian team Daniele Meucci; Stefano La Rosa; Ruggero Pertile; Xavier Chevrier; Daniele D'Onofrio	Men's half marathon	10 July
Bronze	Italian team Chiara Bazzoni; Maria Benedicta Chigbolu; Libania Grenot; Maria Enrica Spacca	Women's 4 × 400 metres relay	10 July

== Results ==
Men

Track & road events

Athlete	Event	Heat		Semifinal		Final	
Athlete	Event	Result	Rank	Result	Rank	Result	Rank
Massimiliano Ferraro	100 m	10.26 PB	5 Q	10.26 =PB	13	did not advance	
Giovanni Galbieri	100 m	10.48	18	did not advance			
Filippo Tortu	100 m	10.25	4 Q	10.19 PB	9	did not advance	
Eseosa Desalu	200 m	—N/a		20.94	17	did not advance	
Antonio Infantino	200 m	20.99	9 Q	20.93	16	did not advance	
Davide Manenti	200 m	20.82	5 Q	20.46	5 q	20.66	6
Matteo Galvan	400 m	—N/a		45.12 =NR	2 Q	45.80	8
Giuseppe Leonardi	400 m	47.68	21	did not advance			
Giordano Benedetti	800 m	1:50.74	24 Q	1:46.74	4 q	1:47.64	8
Jacopo Lahbi	800 m	1:47.27 SB	4 q	1:48.47	12	did not advance	
Mohad Abdikadar Sheikh Ali	1500 m	3:42.91	15	—N/a		did not advance	
Joao Bussotti Neves	1500 m	3:50.58	33 q	—N/a		3:50.43	12
Marco Pettenazzo	1500 m	3:45.65	29	—N/a		did not advance	
Jamel Chatbi	5000 m	—N/a				13:49.93	11
Yemaneberhan Crippa	5000 m	—N/a				13:46.30	8
Ahmed El Mazoury	10000 m	—N/a				29:29.36	9
Emanuele Abate	110 m hurdles	13.63 SB	4 Q	13.54 SB	13	did not advance	
Hassane Fofana	110 m hurdles	13.71	7 q	13.52 PB	12	did not advance	
Lorenzo Perini	110 m hurdles	13.68	6 Q	13.79	20	did not advance	
José Reynaldo Bencosme	400 m hurdles	—N/a		49.77	16	did not advance	
Mattia Contini	400 m hurdles	51.26	14 Q	50.78	21	did not advance	
Mario Lambrughi	400 m hurdles	51.06	12 Q	49.60 PB	12	did not advance	
Abdoullah Bamoussa	3000 m steeplechase	8:32.54 PB	6 q	—N/a		8:35.35	8
Jamel Chatbi	3000 m steeplechase	8:33.25	9 Q	—N/a		8:32.43	5
Yuri Floriani	3000 m steeplechase	8:34.82	15 q	—N/a		8:35.94	9
Federico Cattaneo; Massimiliano Ferraro; Davide Manenti; Filippo Tortu	4 x 100 m relay	38.58 SB	3 Q	—N/a		38.69	5
Matteo Galvan; Mario Lambrughi; Michele Tricca; Lorenzo Valentini	4 x 400 m relay	3:06.07 SB	13	—N/a		did not advance	
Xavier Chevrier	Half marathon	—N/a				1:06:31	38
Daniele D'Onofrio	Half marathon	—N/a				1:08:41	65
Stefano La Rosa	Half marathon	—N/a				1:04:15	13
Daniele Meucci	Half marathon	—N/a				1:02:38 SB	3rd place, bronze medalist(s)
Ruggero Pertile	Half marathon	—N/a				1:05:48	29
Italian team	Half marathon	—N/a				3:12:41	3rd place, bronze medalist(s)

Field Events

Athlete	Event	Qualification		Final	
Athlete	Event	Distance	Rank	Distance	Rank
Gianmarco Tamberi	High jump	2.25	=1 Q	2.32	1st place, gold medalist(s)
Lamont Marcell Jacobs	Long jump	7.80	12 q	7.59	11
Sebastiano Bianchetti	Shot put	18.56	25	did not advance	
Hannes Kirchler	Discus throw	63.74	12 q	60.18	10
Roberto Bertolini	Javelin throw	80.58	13	did not advance	
Norbert Bonvecchio	Javelin throw	75.75	24	did not advance	
Simone Falloni	Hammer throw	70.51	18	did not advance	
Marco Lingua	Hammer throw	72.94	10 q	70.00	11

Women

Track & road events

Athlete	Event	Heat		Semifinal		Final	
Athlete	Event	Result	Rank	Result	Rank	Result	Rank
Gloria Hooper	100 m	11.40	6 Q	11.48	13	did not advance	
Irene Siragusa	100 m	11.55	11 q	11.78	22	did not advance	
Martina Amidei	200 m	23.79	21	did not advance			
Gloria Hooper	200 m	—N/a		23.25	13	did not advance	
Irene Siragusa	200 m	23.87	22	did not advance			
Maria Benedicta Chigbolu	400 m	53.51	9 q	52.69	16	did not advance	
Libania Grenot	400 m	—N/a		50.43 EL	1 Q	50.73	1st place, gold medalist(s)
Marta Milani	400 m	54.85	17	did not advance			
Irene Baldessari	800 m	2:06.15	30	did not advance			
Yusneysi Santiusti	800 m	2:04.53	17 Q	2:02.21	12 Q	2:00.53	5
Margherita Magnani	1500 m	4:11.78	8 q	—N/a		4:36.51	11
Veronica Inglese	10000 m	—N/a				31:37.43 PB	6
Micol Cattaneo	100 m hurdles	13.34	17	did not advance			
Giulia Pennella	100 m hurdles	13.04 SB	4 Q	13.55	22	did not advance	
Marzia Caravelli	400 m hurdles	—N/a		56.45	12	did not advance	
Ayomide Folorunso	400 m hurdles	—N/a		55.87	6 Q	55.50 PB	4
Audrey Alloh; Martina Amidei; Gloria Hooper; Irene Siragusa	4 x 100 m relay	43.33	6 Q	—N/a		43.57	8
Chiara Bazzoni; Elena Bonfanti (only in heats); Maria Benedicta Chigbolu; Libania Grenot (only in final); Maria Enrica Spacca	4 x 400 m relay	3:29.57 SB	8 Q	—N/a		3:27.49 SB	3rd place, bronze medalist(s)
Catherine Bertone	Half marathon	—N/a				1:15:06	38
Rosaria Console	Half marathon	—N/a				1:13:12	19
Anna Incerti	Half marathon	—N/a				1:12:51 SB	14
Veronica Inglese	Half marathon	—N/a				1:10:35 PB	2nd place, silver medalist(s)
Laila Soufyane	Half marathon	—N/a				1:13:42	29
Italian team	Half marathon	—N/a				3:36:38	2nd place, silver medalist(s)

Field Events

Athlete	Event	Qualification		Final	
Athlete	Event	Distance	Rank	Distance	Rank
Erika Furlani	High jump	1.85	=16	did not advance	
Desirée Rossit	High jump	1.89	=10 q	1.89	=6
Alessia Trost	High jump	1.89	=5 q	1.89	=6
Sonia Malavisi	Pole vault	4.20	20	did not advance	
Dariya Derkach	Triple jump	13.96w	7 q	13.89	10
Julaika Nicoletti	Shot put	15.81	23	did not advance	
Chiara Rosa	Shot put	16.26	18	did not advance	
Valentina Aniballi	Discus throw	51.66	25	did not advance	
Natalina Capoferri	Discus throw	53.16	23	did not advance	
Stefania Strumillo	Discus throw	59.80 PB	11 Q	55.78	15
