= Italy at the European Athletics Championships =

Italy team at athletics championships

- WA code: ITA
- National federation: FIDAL
- Website: www.fidal.it
- Medals Ranked 6th: Gold 65 Silver 59 Bronze 63 Total 187

European Athletics Championships appearances (overview)
- 1934; 1938; 1946; 1950; 1954; 1958; 1962; 1966; 1969; 1971; 1974; 1978; 1982; 1986; 1990; 1994; 1998; 2002; 2006; 2010; 2012; 2014; 2016; 2018; 2022; 2024; 2026

Italy has participated in all editions of the European Athletics Championships, held since the first edition of 1934 European Athletics Championships.

== Summary ==
Italians have won 33 titles in the men's field and 7 in the women's field. The men's marathon is a specialty, with five wins in the men's field (two each for the Olympic champions Gelindo Bordin and Stefano Baldini, plus that of Daniele Meucci) and two in the women's field with Maria Guida and Anna Incerti.

Pietro Mennea, Adolfo Consolini and Yemaneberhan Crippa, three times each, are the Blues with the most European titles, while in the women's field Messina Annarita Sidoti and Libania Grenot, with two victories each, hold this record. In Stuttgart 1986 the Italian athletes achieved a historical undertaking by painting the entire podium of blue with Stefano Mei, Alberto Cova and Totò Antibo in the 10,000 meters, a result repeated in the marathon race in Budapest 1998 with Stefano Baldini, Danilo Goffi and Giacomo Modica.

== Medal count ==
Best performance

✓ Update to the new medals after doping disqualifications.

Edition	Team					Men			Men champions	Women champions
Edition	1st place, gold medalist(s)	2nd place, silver medalist(s)	3rd place, bronze medalist(s)	Total	Rank	1st place, gold medalist(s)	2nd place, silver medalist(s)	3rd place, bronze medalist(s)	Men champions	Women champions
1934 Turin	1	2	2	5	7th	1	2	2	Beccali (1500 m)	
1938 Paris/Vienna	1	4	3	8	7th	0	4	2		Testoni (80 m hs)
1946 Oslo	1	1	2	4	8th	1	1	1	Consolini (discus)	
1950 Brusselsl	3	5	1	9	5th	3	5	0	Filiput (400 m hs), Dordoni (50 km walk), Consolini (discus)	
1954 Bern	1	1	1	3	8th	1	1	0	Consolini (discus)	
1958 Stockholm	0	1	0	1	11th	0	1	0		
1962 Belgrade	2	1	1	4	6th	2	1	1	Morale (400 m hs), Pamich (50 km walk)	
1966 Budapest	3	0	0	3	5th	3	0	0	Ottoz (110 m hs), Frinolli (400 m hs), Pamich (50 km walk)	
1969 Athens	1	0	3	4	9th	1	0	2	Ottoz (110 m hs)	
1971 Helsinki	1	1	3	5	9th	1	1	3	Arese (1500 m)	
1974 Rome	1	2	2	5	8th	1	2	1	Mennea (200 m)	
1978 Prague	4	1	0	5	4th	3	1	0	Mennea (100 m, 200 m), Ortis (5000 m)	Simeoni (high jump)
1982 Athens	1	2	2	5	6th	1	1	0	Cova (10000 m)	
1986 Stuttgart	2	6	2	10	5th	2	5	2	Mei (10000 m), Bordin (marathon)	
1990 Split	5	2	5	12	4th	4	2	3	Antibo (5000 m, 10000 m), Panetta (3000 m st), Bordin (marathon)	Sidoti (10 km walk)
1994 Helsinki	2	3	3	8	8th	2	1	2	Benvenuti (800 m), Lambruschini (3000 m st)	
1998 Budapest	2	4	3	9	7th	1	2	2	Baldini (marathon)	Sidoti (10 km walk)
2002 München	1	0	3	4	15th	0	0	0		Guida (marathon)
2006 Göteborg	2	0	1	3	9th	2	0	0	Baldini (marathon), Howe (long jump)	
2010 Barcelona ✓	2	3	3	8	8th	1	2	1	Schwazer (20 km walk)	Incerti (marathon)
2012 Helsinki	1	1	1	3	11th	1	1	0	Donato (triple jump)	
2014 Zurich	2	1	0	3	9th	1	0	0	Meucci (marathon)	Grenot (400 m)
2016 Amsterdam	2	2	3	7 (Note: Half marathon team medals not included)	9th	1	0	1	Tamberi (high jump)	Grenot (400 m)
2018 Berlin ✓	0	1	3	4 (Note: The medals won by the marathon team (gold for the men's team and silver for the women's team) at that edition of the championships were not yet counted in the medal table)	16th	0	0	3	Men's marathon team (Yassine Rachik, Eyob Faniel, Stefano La Rosa)	
2022 Munich ✓	3	2	5	10	7th	3	2	3	Marcell Jacobs (100 m) Gianmarco Tamberi (high jump) Yeman Crippa (10,000 m)	
2024 Rome	11	9	4	24	1st	7	7	3	Marcell Jacobs (100 m) Lorenzo Simonelli (110 m hs) Leonardo Fabbri (shot put) Yeman Crippa (half maraton), Half maraton team, Gimbo Tamberi (high jump), 4×100 m relay team	Antonella Palmisano (20 km walk) Nadia Battocletti (5000 m, 10,000 m), Sara Fantini (hammer throw)
2026 Birmingham	10	6	6	22	1st	5	5	0	Leonardo Fabbri (shot put), Gianmarco Tamberi (high jump), Andy Díaz (triple jump), Massimo Stano (marathon race walk), 4×400 m relay team	Nadia Battocletti (5000 m, 10,000 m), Dariya Derkach (triple jump), Sofia Fiorini (marathon race walk), Larissa Iapichino (long jump)
Total	65	61	62	188	6th					

=== Medals awarded years later after doping cases ===
==== 2010 ====
Edition	New medal	Finished	Event	Athlete	Disqualified athlete (position)	Years for decision-making	Notes
(Spain) 2010 Barcelona	1st place, gold medalist(s)	2nd place, silver medalist(s)	Men's 20 km race walk	Alex Schwazer	(Russia) Stanislav Emelyanov (original 1st)	4	
(Spain) 2010 Barcelona	1st place, gold medalist(s)	3rd place, bronze medalist(s)	Women's marathon	Anna Incerti	(Lithuania) Živilė Balčiūnaitė (original 1st) (Russia) Nailya Yulamanova (original 2nd)	1 (became 2nd); 2 (became 1st)	
(Spain) 2010 Barcelona	3rd place, bronze medalist(s)	4th	Women's 4 × 400 m relay	Chiara Bazzoni; Marta Milani; Maria Enrica Spacca; Libania Grenot	Russia (original 1st)	2	
(Spain) 2010 Barcelona	3rd place, bronze medalist(s)	4th	Women's 400 m	Libania Grenot	(Russia) Tatiana Firova (original 1st)	9	

==== 2018 ====
Although in April 2018, before this European Championship race in Berlin 2018, which actually took place on August 11, the Disciplinary Commission of the Czech Athletics Association (CAS) had notified the czech athlete Anežka Drahotová of an irregularity in her biological passport (doping), on 19 July 2021 (three years later), the athlete was cleared and the silver medal she won on the field was reassigned, as also confirmed by the Statistic Handbook published by the EAA on the eve of Roma 2024.

But the situation that seemed to be over took a further turn on 15 May 2025, therefore after the publication of the EAA Statistical Handbook of Rome 2024, when WADA's appeal against the acquittal ruling of July 2021 was accepted and at this point the EAA rewrote the competition rankings, once again excluding Drahotova from the rankings. As a result, the Italian Antonella Palmisano moves from bronze to silver while the bronze medal is awarded to the Lithuanian Živilė Vaiciukevičiūtė who came in 4th.

==== 2022 ====
The finish order of the 3000 metres steeplechase was rewritten by the EAA on 14 December 2023, following the doping disqualification of Italian Ahmed Abdelwahed, who had finished second.

As a result, Italian Osama Zoghlami moved up from bronze to silver, while the silver medal was awarded to Spanish Daniel Arce, who had finished fourth.

== Medalists ==
Updated after Roma 2024 and not included Amsterdam 2016 half marathon team medals.

Athletes still active

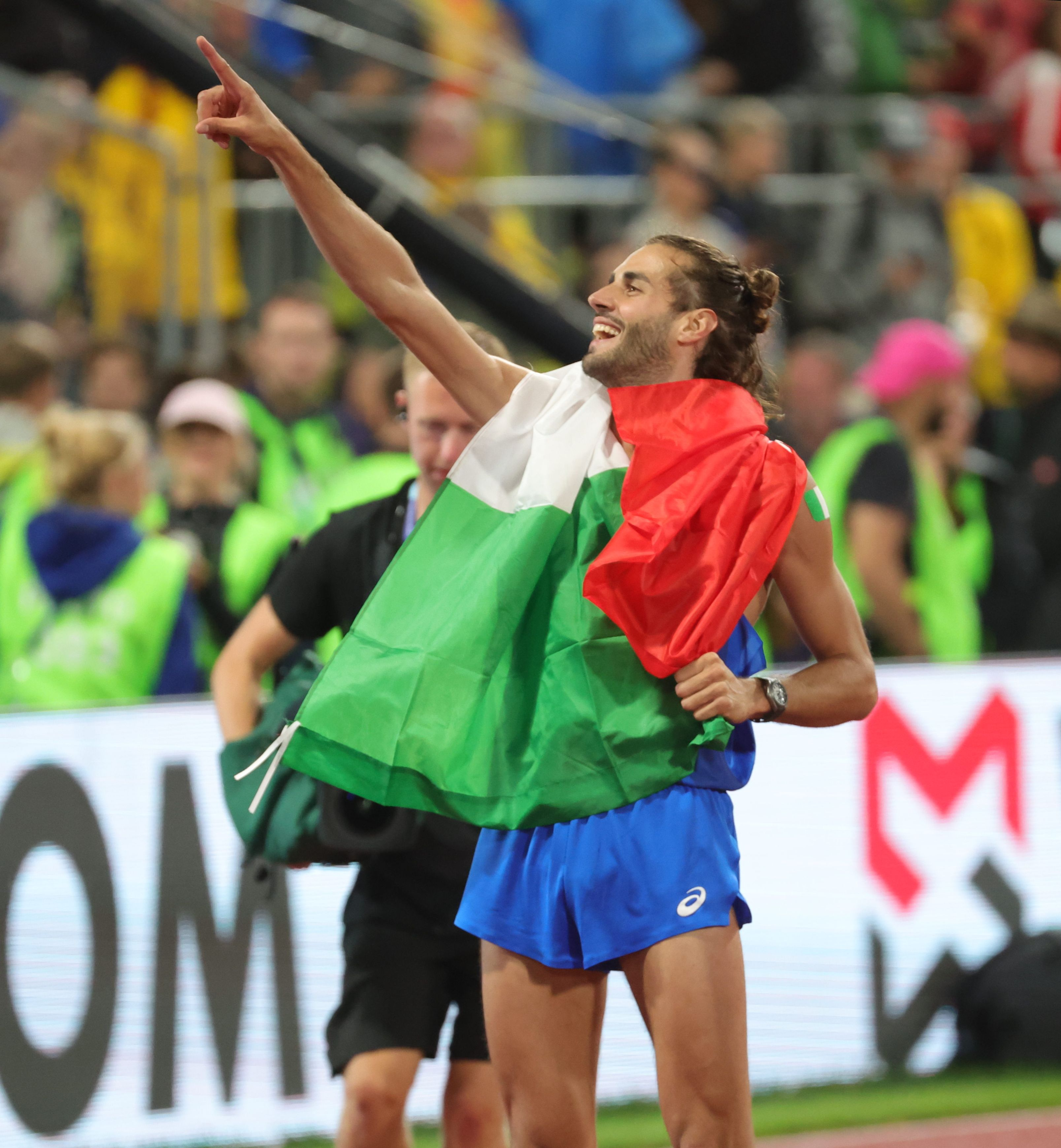
Gimbo Tamberi, three individual gold medals won.

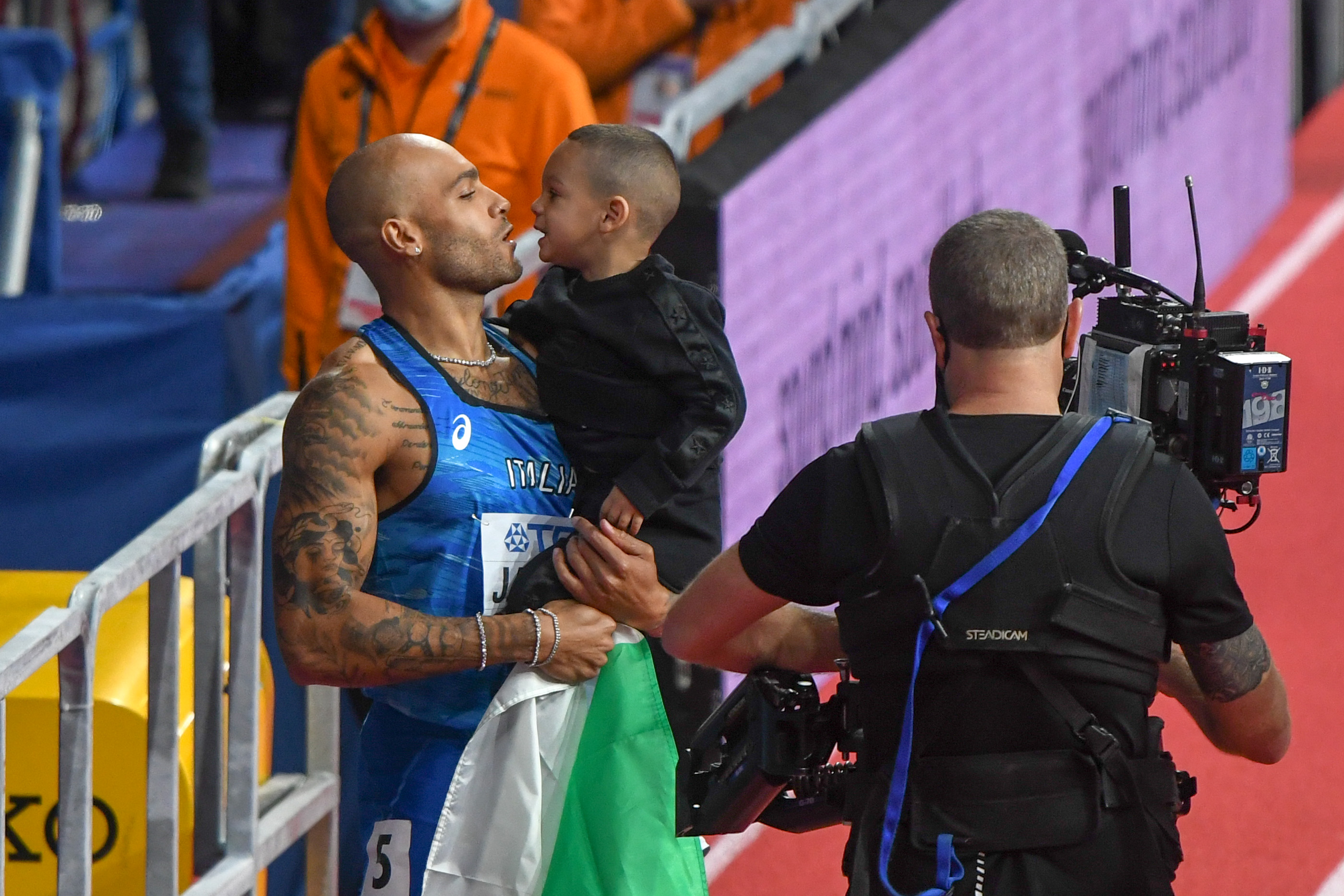
Marcell Jacobs (in this shot with his child), two individual gold medals won and one with the relay team.

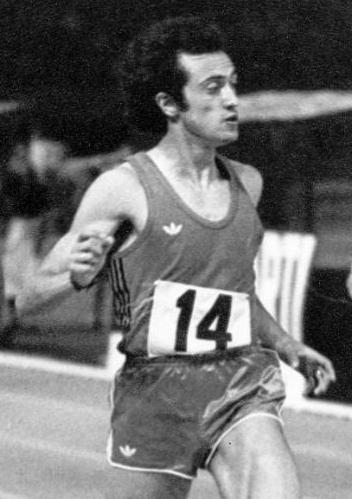
Pietro Mennea, six medals at the EC

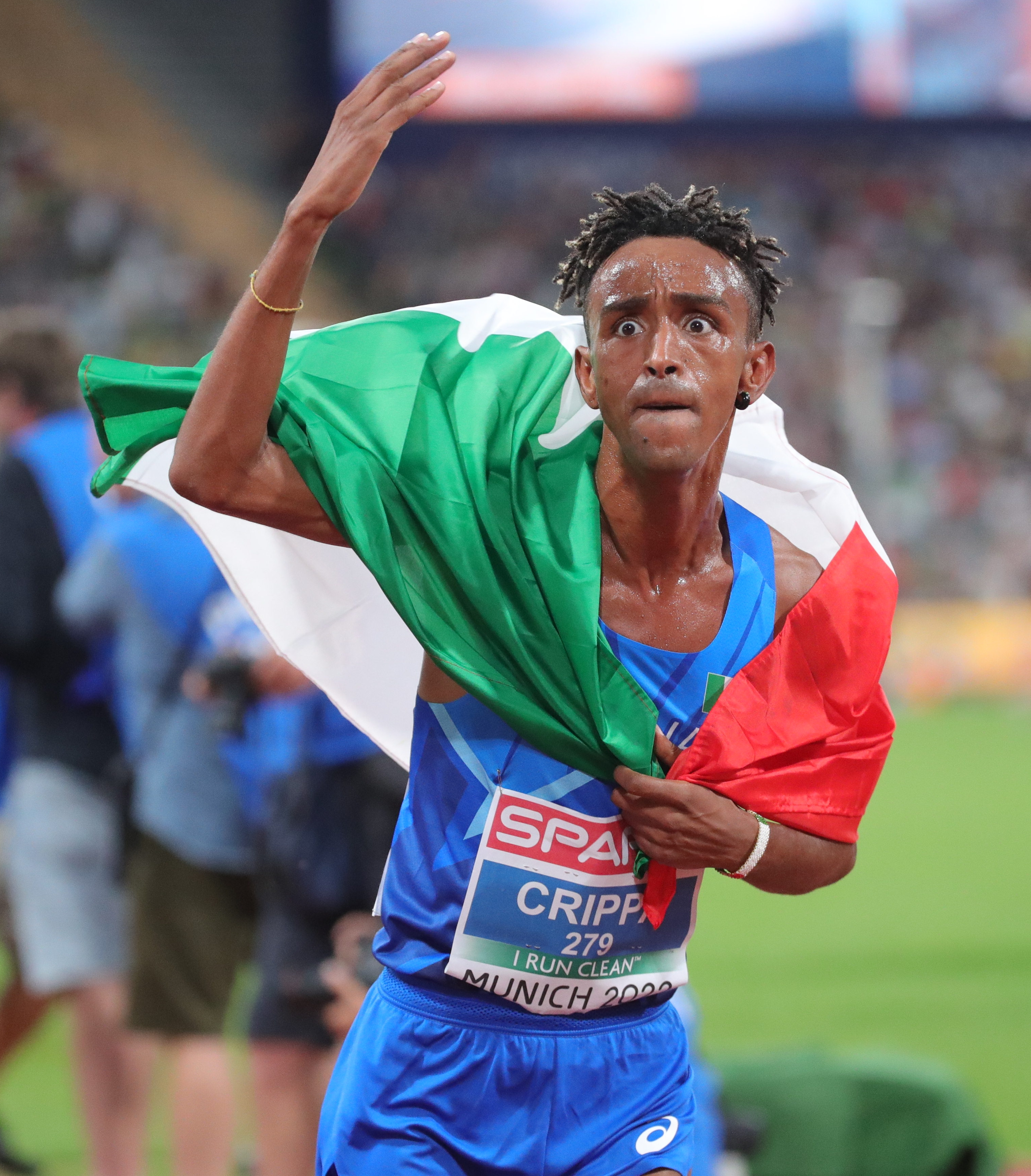
Yeman Crippa, five medals at the EC

Athlete	Gold	Silver	Bronze	Total	Editions	Events
Pietro Mennea	3	2	1	6	1971–1978	100 m, 200 m, 4x100 m relay
Yemaneberhan Crippa	3	0	2	5	2018-2024	5,000 m, 10,000 m, half maraton
Gianmarco Tamberi	3	0	0	3	2016-2024	high jump
Marcell Jacobs	3	0	0	3	2022-2024	100 m, 4x100 m relay
Adolfo Consolini	3	0	0	3	1946–1954	discus throw
Daniele Meucci	2	1	2	5	2010-2024	10,000 m, Marathon, Half marathon
Abdon Pamich	2	1	0	3	1958–1966	50 km walk
Annarita Sidoti	2	1	0	3	1990–1998	10 km walk
Libania Grenot	2	0	3	5	2014-2016	400 m, 4x400 m relay
Salvatore Antibo	2	0	1	3	1986–1990	5000 m, 10000 m
Nadia Battocletti	2	0	0	2	2024	5000 m, 10,000 m
Eddy Ottoz	2	0	0	2	1966–1969	110 m hs
Gelindo Bordin	2	0	0	2	1986–1990	marathon
Stefano Baldini	2	0	0	2	1998–2006	marathon
Stefano Mei	1	1	1	3	1986–1990	5000 m, 10000 m
Alessandro Lambruschini	1	1	1	3	1990–1998	3000 m st
Armando Filiput	1	1	0	2	1950	400 m hs, 4x400 m relay
Venanzio Ortis	1	1	0	2	1978	5000 m, 10000 m
Alberto Cova	1	1	0	2	1982–1986	10000 m
Francesco Panetta	1	1	0	2	1986–1990	3000 m st
Sara Simeoni	1	0	2	3	1974–1982	high jump
Luigi Beccali	1	0	1	2	1934–1938	1500 m
Antonella Palmisano	1	0	1	2	2018-2024	20 km walk
Yassine Rachik	1	0	1	2	2018	Marathon Cup
Claudia Testoni	1	0	0	1	1938	80 m hs
Giuseppe Dordoni	1	0	0	1	1950	50 km walk
Salvatore Morale	1	0	0	1	1962	400 m hs
Roberto Frinolli	1	0	0	1	1966	400 m hs
Franco Arese	1	0	0	1	1971	1500 m
Andrea Benvenuti	1	0	0	1	1994	800 me
Maria Guida	1	0	0	1	2002	marathon
Andrew Howe	1	0	0	1	2006	long jump
Anna Incerti	1	0	0	1	2010	marathon
Alex Schwazer	1	0	0	1	2010	20 km walk
Fabrizio Donato	1	0	0	1	2012	long jump
Eyob Faniel	1	0	0	1	2018	marathon
Lorenzo Simonelli	1	0	0	1	2024	110 m hs
Leonardo Fabbri	1	0	0	1	2024	shot put
Giuseppe Tosi	0	3	0	3	1946–1954	discus throw

== See also ==
- Athletics in Italy
- Italy national athletics team
- Italy at the World Championships in Athletics
- Italy at the European Athletics Indoor Championships
