= Egidio Pribetti =

Italian long jumper

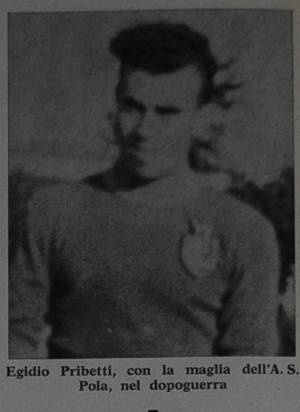

Personal information
- National team: Italy: 4 caps (1946-1947)
- Born: 19 October 1925 Parenzo, Kingdom of Italy

Sport
- Sport: Athletics
- Event: Long jump
- Club: Fascio Grion Pola (1943-1944); A.S. Pola (1945)

Achievements and titles
- Personal best: Long jump: 7.30 (1946)

Egigio Pribetti (19 October 1925) is an Italian former long jumper, speciality in which he was 4th at the 1946 European Athletics Championships.

== Achievements ==
Year	Competition	Venue	Rank	Event	Time	Notes
1946	European Championships	(Norway) Oslo	4th	Long jump	7.28 m	

== See also ==
- Italy at the 1946 European Athletics Championships
