= Olle Laessker =

Swedish track and field athlete

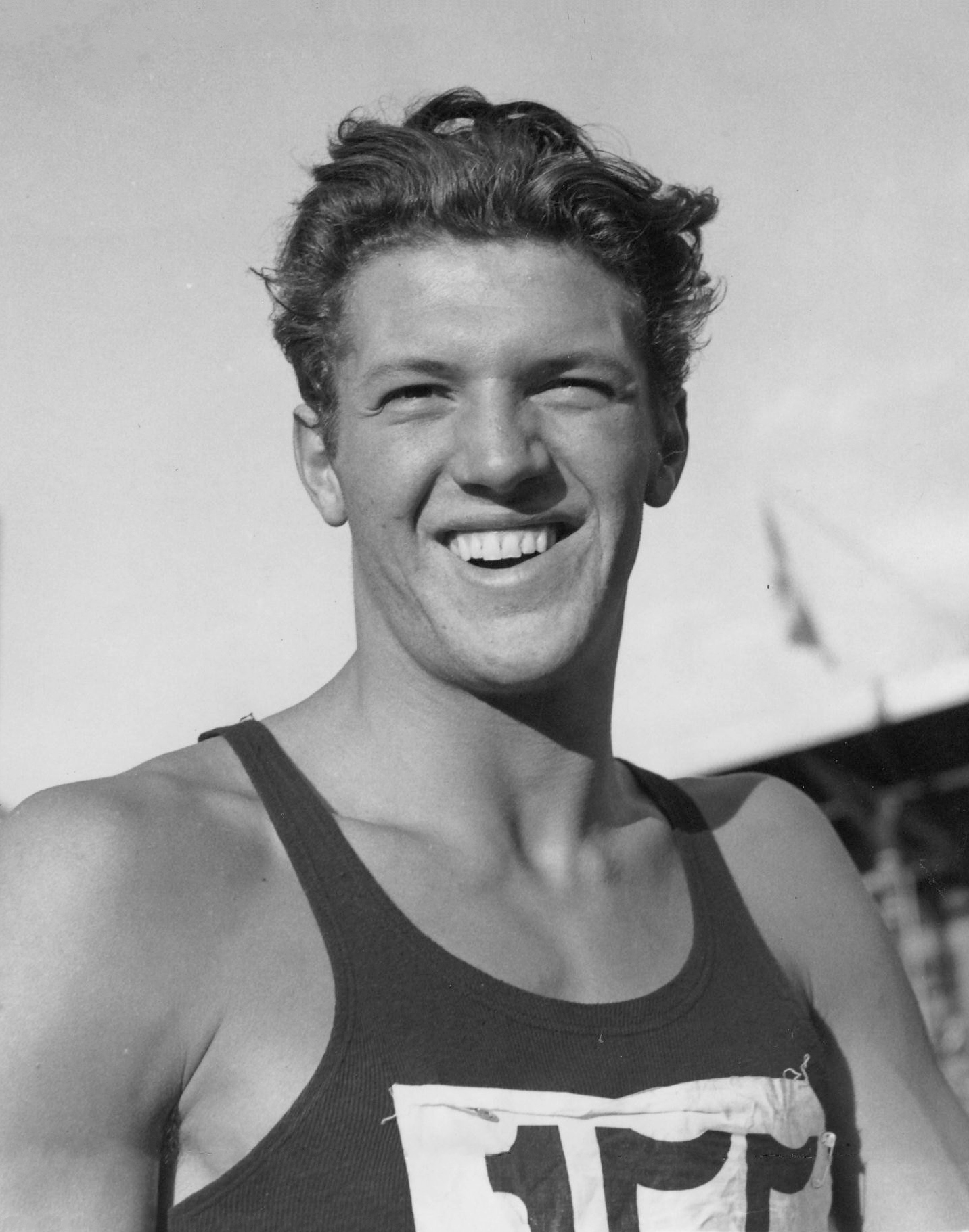

Personal information
- Born: 2 April 1922
- Died: 19 September 1992 (aged 70)

Sport
- Sport: Athletics
- Event(s): 100–400 m, long jump
- Club: Jönköping AIF; Gavle SGF

Achievements and titles
- Personal best(s): 100 m – 10.7 (1947); 200 m – 21.8 (1945); 400 m – 48.8 (1945); LJ – 7.50 m (1946)
Medal record
Men's athletics
Representing Sweden
European Championships
Gold medal – first place	1946 Oslo	4×100 m
Gold medal – first place	1946 Oslo	Long jump

Olle Laessker (2 April 1922 – 19 September 1992) was a Swedish track and field athlete who competed in long jump and sprinting events.

He had his best achievements at the 1946 European Athletics Championships in Oslo, where he won the long jump by a margin of two centimeters, then teamed up with Stig Danielsson, Inge Nilsson and Stig Håkansson to win a second gold for Sweden in the 4 × 100 metres relay. He was Sweden's first European medallist in the long jump.

Laessker was awarded the Stora grabbars märke for his achievements, listed as the 116th recipient in the sport of athletics. He was the Swedish long jump champion in 1946 and 1947.
