= Italy at the 1998 European Athletics Championships =

- WA code: ITA

in (Hungary) Budapest 18 August 1998 – 23 August 1998
- Medals Ranked 7th: Gold 2 Silver 4 Bronze 3 Total 9

European Athletics Championships appearances (overview)
- 1934; 1938; 1946; 1950; 1954; 1958; 1962; 1966; 1969; 1971; 1974; 1978; 1982; 1986; 1990; 1994; 1998; 2002; 2006; 2010; 2012; 2014; 2016; 2018; 2022; 2024

Italy competed at the 1998 European Athletics Championships in Budapest, Hungary, from 18 to 23 August 1998.

== Medalists ==
| Medal | Athlete | Event |
|---|---|---|
| 1st place, gold medalist(s) | Stefano Baldini | Men's marathon |
| 1st place, gold medalist(s) | Annarita Sidoti | Women's 10 km race walk |
| 2nd place, silver medalist(s) | Danilo Goffi | Men's marathon |
| 2nd place, silver medalist(s) | Alessandro Lambruschini | Men's 3000 m steeplechase |
| 2nd place, silver medalist(s) | Erica Alfridi | Women's 10 km race walk |
| 2nd place, silver medalist(s) | Fiona May | Women's long jump |
| 3rd place, bronze medalist(s) | Vincenzo Modica | Men's marathon |
| 3rd place, bronze medalist(s) | Fabrizio Mori | Men's 400 m hurdles |
| 3rd place, bronze medalist(s) | Maura Viceconte | Women's marathon |

== See also ==
- Italy national athletics team
