= Italy at the 1971 European Athletics Championships =

- WA code: ITA

in (Finland) Helsinki 10 August 1971 – 15 August 1971
- Competitors: 47
- Medals Ranked 9th: Gold 1 Silver 1 Bronze 3 Total 5

European Athletics Championships appearances (overview)
- 1934; 1938; 1946; 1950; 1954; 1958; 1962; 1966; 1969; 1971; 1974; 1978; 1982; 1986; 1990; 1994; 1998; 2002; 2006; 2010; 2012; 2014; 2016; 2018; 2022; 2024

Italy competed at the 1971 European Athletics Championships in Helsinki, Finland, from 10 to 15 August 1971.

== Medalists ==
| Medal | Athlete | Event |
|---|---|---|
| 1st place, gold medalist(s) | Francesco Arese | Men's 1500 m |
| 2nd place, silver medalist(s) | Marcello Fiasconaro | Men's 400 m |
| 3rd place, bronze medalist(s) | Vincenzo Guerini; Pietro Mennea; Pasqualino Abeti; Ennio Preatoni | Men's 4 × 100 m relay |
| 3rd place, bronze medalist(s) | Lorenzo Cellerino; Giacomo Puosi; Sergio Bello; Marcello Fiasconaro | Men's 4 × 400 m relay |
| 3rd place, bronze medalist(s) | Renato Dionisi | Men's pole vault |

== Results ==
(36 men, 11 women)

=== Men ===
| Event | Athlete | Result |
|---|---|---|
| 100M | Norberto Oliosi | elim. in semif. (5. in 1sf with 10.7 / 10.68, 4. in 2b with 10.8 / 10.82) |
| 200M | Pietro Mennea | 6. with 20.9 / 20.88 (2. in 2sf with 21.2 / 21.23, 2. in 3b with 21.2 / 21.20) |
| 400M | Marcello Fiasconaro | 2. with 45.5 / 45.49 (3. in 1sf with 46.5 / 46.44, 2. in 1b with 46.5 / 46.49) |
| 400M | Giacomo Puosi | elim. in heat (5. in 3b with 47.6) |
| 1500M | Franco Arese | 1. with 3: 38.4 / 3: 38.43 (2. in 3b with 3: 52.1) |
| 1500M | Gianni Del Buono | elim. in heat (11. in 2b with 4: 01.8) |
| 1500M | Renzo Finelli | elim. in heat (8. in 1b with 3: 43.9) |
| 5000M | Giuseppe Ardizzone | elim. in heat (9. in 2b with 14: 06.6) |
| 5000M | Giuseppe Cindolo | elim. in heat (6. in 3b with 13: 54.8) |
| 10.000M | Giuseppe Cindolo | 27. with 29: 13.8 / 29.13.65 |
| MARATHON | Antonio Brutti | 12. with 2h19: 34.8 |
| MARATHON | Giacomo Marietta | 17. with 2h21: 30.0 |
| MARATHON | Mario Binato | 28. with 2h24: 57.8 |
| 3000M steeplechase | Umberto Risi | elim. in heat (6. in 1b with 8: 37.2 / 8: 37.15) |
| 3000M steeplechase | Francesco Valenti | elim. in heat (10. in 2b with 8: 58.0 / 8: 57.93) |
| 110M hs | Sergio Liani | 6. with 14.4 / 14.40 (3. in 2sf with 14.1 / 14.13, 1. in 1b with 14.1 / 14.10) |
| 110M hs | Marco Acerbi | elim. in heat (5. in 4b with 14.6 / 14.56) |
| 110M hs | Luigi D'Onofrio | elim. in heat (6. in 3b with 15.0 / 14.95) |
| 400M hs | Giorgio Ballati | elim. in semif. (7. in 1sf with 51.5 / 51.50, 4. in 2b with 51.1 / 51.07) |
| 400M hs | Daniele Giovanardi | elim. in heat (7. in 3b with 52.0 / 52.00) |
| HIGH | Gian Marco Schivo | 15. with 2.08 (2.12 in which) |
| HIGH | Erminio Azzaro | 17. with 2.05 (2.12 in qual.) |
| Pole vault | Renato Dionisi | 3. with 5.30 (5.00 in qual.) |
| Pole vault | Aldo Righi | elim. in which. with 4.60 |
| TRIPLE | Giuseppe Gentile | 12. with 14.00 (16.46 in which) |
| DISC | Armando De Vincentiis | elim. in what. with 55.48 |
| DISC | Silvano Simeon | elim. in which. without size |
| HAMMER | Mario Vecchiato | 10. with 66.96 (66.02 in qual.) |
| Javelin throw | Renzo Cramerotti | 11. with 72.92 (77.52 in qual.) |
| 4x100M | Italy; Vincenzo Guerini; Pietro Mennea; Pasqualino Abeti; Ennio Preatoni | 3. with 39.8 / 39.78 (4. in 1b with 40.0 / 39.95) |
| 4x400M | Italy; Gian Lorenzo Cellerino; Giacomo Puosi; Sergio Bello; Marcello Fiasconaro | 3. with 3: 04.6 / 3: 04.58 (3. in 2b with 3: 07.3 / 3: 07.28) |
| WALK KM 20 | Pasquale Busca | 10. with 1h32: 44.2 |
| WALK KM 50 | Abdon Pamich | 8. with 4h14: 36.2; Vittorio Visini 15. with 4h20: 45.8. |

=== Women ===
| Event | Athlete | Result |
|---|---|---|
| 100M | Cecilia Molinari | elim. in semif. (5. in 1sf with 11.9 / 11.92, 3. in 3b with 11.9 / 11.90) |
| 800M | Angela Ramello | elim. in semif. (7. in 1sf with 2: 07.5, 4. in 1b with 2: 05.7 / 2: 05.70) |
| 800M | Donata Govoni | elim. in semif. (7. in 2sf with 2: 05.0, 2. in 4b with 2: 05.5 / 2: 05.48) |
| 1500M | Angela Ramello | elim. in heat (10. in 1b with 4: 30.3) |
| 1500M | Zina Boniolo | elim. in heat (10. in 3b with 4: 31.4) |
| 100M hs | Ileana Ongar | elim. in semif. (7. in 2sf with 14.5 / 14.45, 4. in 2b with 14.5 / 14.51) |
| HIGH | Sara Simeoni | 9. with 1.78 (1.73 in qual.) |
| HIGH | Isabella Pigato | elim. in which. with 1.55 |
| HIGH | Silvia Massenz | elim. in which. with 1.65 |
| 4x100M | Italy; Maddalena Grassano; Alessandra Orselli; Laura Nappi; Cecilia Molinari | elim. in heat (5. in 1b with 45.7 / 45.71) (). |

== See also ==
- Italy national athletics team
