= Italy at the 2006 European Athletics Championships =

- WA code: ITA

in (Sweden) Gothenburg 7 August 2006 – 13 August 2006
- Medals Ranked 10th: Gold 2 Silver 0 Bronze 1 Total 3

European Athletics Championships appearances (overview)
- 1934; 1938; 1946; 1950; 1954; 1958; 1962; 1966; 1969; 1971; 1974; 1978; 1982; 1986; 1990; 1994; 1998; 2002; 2006; 2010; 2012; 2014; 2016; 2018; 2022; 2024

Italy competed at the 2006 European Athletics Championships in Gothenburg, Sweden, from 7 to 13 August 2006.

== Medalists ==
Medal	Athlete	Event
1st place, gold medalist(s)	Stefano Baldini	Men's marathon
1st place, gold medalist(s)	Andrew Howe	Men's long jump
3rd place, bronze medalist(s)	Elisa Rigaudo	Women's 20 km race walk

== See also ==
- Italy national athletics team
