= Italy at the 1950 European Athletics Championships =

- WA code: ITA

in (Belgium) Brussels 23 August 1950 – 27 August 1950
- Competitors: 33
- Medals Ranked 5th: Gold 3 Silver 5 Bronze 5 Total 13

European Athletics Championships appearances (overview)
- 1934; 1938; 1946; 1950; 1954; 1958; 1962; 1966; 1969; 1971; 1974; 1978; 1982; 1986; 1990; 1994; 1998; 2002; 2006; 2010; 2012; 2014; 2016; 2018; 2022; 2024; 2026

Italy competed at the 1950 European Athletics Championships in Brussels, Belgium, from 23 to 27 August 1950.

== Medalists ==
Medal	Athlete	Event
1st place, gold medalist(s)	Armando Filiput	Men's 400 m hurdles
1st place, gold medalist(s)	Pino Dordoni	Men's 50 km walk
1st place, gold medalist(s)	Adolfo Consolini	Men's Discus throw
2nd place, silver medalist(s)	Franco Leccese	Men's 100 m
2nd place, silver medalist(s)	Baldassare Porto; Armando Filiput; Luigi Paterlini; Antonio Siddi	Men's 4 × 400 m relay
2nd place, silver medalist(s)	Angiolo Profeti	Men's shot put
2nd place, silver medalist(s)	Giuseppe Tosi	Men's Discus throw
2nd place, silver medalist(s)	Teseo Taddia	Men's hammer throw
3rd place, bronze medalist(s)	Edera Cordiale	Women's Discus throw

== Top eight ==
=== Men ===
Athlete	100 m	200 m	400 m	800 m	1500 m	5000 m	10,000 m	110 m hs	400 m hs	3000 m st	4×100 m relay	4×400 m relay	Marathon	50 km walk	High jump	Pole vault	Long jump	Triple jump	Shot put	Discus throw	Hammer throw	Javelin throw	Decathlon
Franco Leccese	2nd place, silver medalist(s)																						
Gesualdo Penna	8																						
Angelo Moretti		4																					
Luigi Paterlini			6																				
Antonio Siddi			8																				
Albano Albanese								4															
Armando Filiput									1st place, gold medalist(s)														
Ottavio Missoni									4														
Relay team Franco Leccese; Gino Riva; Giuseppe Guzzi; Angelo Moretti											6												
Relay team Baldassare Porto; Armando Filiput; Luigi Paterlini; Antonio Siddi												2nd place, silver medalist(s)											
Pino Dordoni														1st place, gold medalist(s)									
Angiolo Profeti																			2nd place, silver medalist(s)				
Adolfo Consolini																				1st place, gold medalist(s)			
Giuseppe Tosi																				2nd place, silver medalist(s)			
Teseo Taddia																					2nd place, silver medalist(s)		
Amos Matteucci																						6	

=== Women ===
Athlete	100 m	200 m	80 m hs	4×100 m relay	High jump	Long jump	Shot put	Discus throw	Javelin throw	Pentathlon
Relay team Maria Musso; Laura Sivi; Micaela Bora; Vittoria Cesarini				5						
Silvana Pierucci						5				
Amelia Piccinini							7			
Edera Cordiale								3rd place, bronze medalist(s)		
Gabre Gabric								7		

== See also ==
- Italy national athletics team
