= Italy at the 1986 European Athletics Championships =

- WA code: ITA

in (West Germany) Stuttgart 26 August 1986 – 31 August 1986
- Medals Ranked 5th: Gold 2 Silver 6 Bronze 2 Total 10

European Athletics Championships appearances (overview)
- 1934; 1938; 1946; 1950; 1954; 1958; 1962; 1966; 1969; 1971; 1974; 1978; 1982; 1986; 1990; 1994; 1998; 2002; 2006; 2010; 2012; 2014; 2016; 2018; 2022; 2024

Italy competed at the 1986 European Athletics Championships in Stuttgart, West Germany, from 26 to 31 August 1986.

== Medalists ==
Medal	Athlete	Event
1st place, gold medalist(s)	Stefano Mei	Men's 10,000 m
1st place, gold medalist(s)	Gelindo Bordin	Men's marathon
2nd place, silver medalist(s)	Stefano Mei	Men's 5000 m
2nd place, silver medalist(s)	Alberto Cova	Men's 10,000 m
2nd place, silver medalist(s)	Orlando Pizzolato	Men's marathon
2nd place, silver medalist(s)	Francesco Panetta	Men's 3000 m steeplechase
2nd place, silver medalist(s)	Maurizio Damilano	Men's 20 km walk
2nd place, silver medalist(s)	Laura Fogli	Women's marathon
3rd place, bronze medalist(s)	Salvatore Antibo	Men's 10,000 m
3rd place, bronze medalist(s)	Giovanni Evangelisti	Men's Long jump

== Top eight ==
=== Men ===
Athlete	100 m	200 m	400 m	800 m	1500 m	5000 m	10,000 m	110 m hs	400 m hs	3000 m st	4×100 m relay	4×400 m relay	Marathon	20 km walk	50 km walk	High jump	Pole vault	Long jump	Triple jump	Shot put	Discus throw	Hammer throw	Javelin throw	Decathlon
Stefano Mei						2nd place, silver medalist(s)	1st place, gold medalist(s)																	
Alberto Cova						8	2nd place, silver medalist(s)																	
Salvatore Antibo							3rd place, bronze medalist(s)																	
Francesco Panetta										2nd place, silver medalist(s)														
Relay team Antonio Ullo; Carlo Simionato; Pierfrancesco Pavoni; Stefano Tilli											4													
Relay team Giovanni Bongiorni; Mauro Zuliani; Vito Petrella; Roberto Ribaud												6												
Gelindo Bordin													1st place, gold medalist(s)											
Orlando Pizzolato													2nd place, silver medalist(s)											
Maurizio Damilano														2nd place, silver medalist(s)										
Walter Arena														5										
Giovanni Evangelisti																		3rd place, bronze medalist(s)						
Alessandro Andrei																				4				

=== Women ===
Athlete	100 m	200 m	400 m	800 m	1500 m	3000 m	10,000 m	100 m hs	400 m hs	4×100 m relay	4×400 m relay	Marathon	10 km walk	High jump	Long jump	Shot put	Discus throw	Javelin throw	Heptathlon
Relay team Marisa Masullo; Cosetta Campana; Giuseppina Cirulli; Erica Rossi											5								
Laura Fogli												2nd place, silver medalist(s)							

== See also ==
- Italy national athletics team
