= Italy at the 1966 European Athletics Championships =

- WA code: ITA

in (Hungary) Budapest 30 August 1966 – 4 September 1966
- Competitors: 35 (31 men, 4 women)
- Medals Ranked 6th: Gold 3 Silver 0 Bronze 0 Total 3

European Athletics Championships appearances (overview)
- 1934; 1938; 1946; 1950; 1954; 1958; 1962; 1966; 1969; 1971; 1974; 1978; 1982; 1986; 1990; 1994; 1998; 2002; 2006; 2010; 2012; 2014; 2016; 2018; 2022; 2024

Italy competed at the 1966 European Athletics Championships in Budapest, Hungary, from 30 August to 4 September 1966.

== Medalists ==
Medal	Athlete	Event
1st place, gold medalist(s)	Eddy Ottoz	Men's 110 m hs
1st place, gold medalist(s)	Roberto Frinolli	Men's 400 m hs
1st place, gold medalist(s)	Abdon Pamich	Men's 50 km walk

== Top eight ==
=== Men ===
Athlete	100 m	200 m	400 m	800 m	1500 m	5000 m	10,000 m	110 m hs	400 m hs	3000 m st	4×100 m relay	4×400 m relay	Marathon	20 km walk	50 km walk	High jump	Pole vault	Long jump	Triple jump	Shot put	Discus throw	Hammer throw	Javelin throw	Decathlon
Ito Giani	5																							
Pasquale Giannattasio	8																							
Livio Berruti		7																						
Ennio Preatoni		8																						
Eddy Ottoz								1st place, gold medalist(s)																
Giovanni Cornacchia								5																
Sergio Liani								6																
Roberto Frinolli									1st place, gold medalist(s)															
Abdon Pamich															1st place, gold medalist(s)									
Vittorio Visini															8									
Renato Dionisi																	4							
Silvano Simeon																					6			
Relay team Ennio Preatoni; Ito Giani; Nello Simoncelli; Sergio Ottolina											6													
Relay team Bruno Bianchi; Roberto Frinolli; Furio Fusi; Sergio Bello												6												

=== Women ===
No Italian female athlete has been classified in the top eight at these editions of the European Championships.

== See also ==
- Italy national athletics team
