= Italy at the 2014 European Athletics Championships =

- WA code: ITA

in Zürich
- Competitors: 78
- Medals Ranked 9th: Gold 2 Silver 1 Bronze 0 Total 3

European Athletics Championships appearances (overview)
- 1934; 1938; 1946; 1950; 1954; 1958; 1962; 1966; 1969; 1971; 1974; 1978; 1982; 1986; 1990; 1994; 1998; 2002; 2006; 2010; 2012; 2014; 2016; 2018; 2022; 2024

Italy competed at the 2014 European Athletics Championships in Zürich, Switzerland, between 12 and 17 August 2014. A delegation of 78 athletes were sent to represent the country.

== Medalists ==
Medal	Athlete	Event
1st place, gold medalist(s)	Daniele Meucci	Men's marathon
1st place, gold medalist(s)	Libania Grenot	Women's 400 m
2nd place, silver medalist(s)	Valeria Straneo	Women's marathon

== Top eight ==
=== Men ===
Athlete	100 m	200 m	400 m	800 m	1500 m	5000 m	10,000 m	110 m hs	400 m hs	3000 m st	4×100 m relay	4×400 m relay	Marathon	20 km walk	50 km walk	High jump	Pole vault	Long jump	Triple jump	Shot put	Discus throw	Hammer throw	Javelin throw	Decathlon
Diego Marani		5																						
Daniele Meucci							6						1st place, gold medalist(s)											
Stefano La Rosa							8																	
Relay team Fabio Cerutti; Eseosa Desalu; Diego Marani; Delmas Obou											7													
Ruggero Pertile													7											
Giorgio Rubino														8										
Marco De Luca															7									
Gianmarco Tamberi																7								
Marco Fassinotti																7								
Fabrizio Donato																			7					

=== Women ===
Athlete	100 m	200 m	400 m	800 m	1500 m	5000 m	10,000 m	100 m hs	400 m hs	3000 m st	4×100 m relay	4×400 m relay	Marathon	20 km walk	High jump	Pole vault	Long jump	Triple jump	Shot put	Discus throw	Hammer throw	Javelin throw	Heptathlon
Libania Grenot			1st place, gold medalist(s)																				
Federica Del Buono					5																		
Giulia Viola						8																	
Yadisleidy Pedroso									5														
Relay team Marzia Caravelli; Irene Siragusa; Martina Amidei; Audrey Alloh											4												
Relay team Chiara Bazzoni; Maria Enrica Spacca; Elena Bonfanti; Libania Grenot												7											
Valeria Straneo													2nd place, silver medalist(s)										
Anna Incerti													6										
Eleonora Giorgi														5									
Antonella Palmisano														7									
Chiara Rosa																			5				
