= Italy at the 2010 European Athletics Championships =

- WA code: ITA

in (Spain) Barcelona
- Competitors: 73
- Medals Ranked 8th: Gold 2 Silver 3 Bronze 3 Total 8

European Athletics Championships appearances (overview)
- 1934; 1938; 1946; 1950; 1954; 1958; 1962; 1966; 1969; 1971; 1974; 1978; 1982; 1986; 1990; 1994; 1998; 2002; 2006; 2010; 2012; 2014; 2016; 2018; 2022; 2024

Italy was represented by 73 athletes (44 men and 29 women) at the 2010 European Athletics Championships held in Barcelona, Spain. It is the third most important team selection, after those of Munich 2002 and Göteborg 2006. The standard-bearer will be Antonietta Di Martino.

== Medalists ==
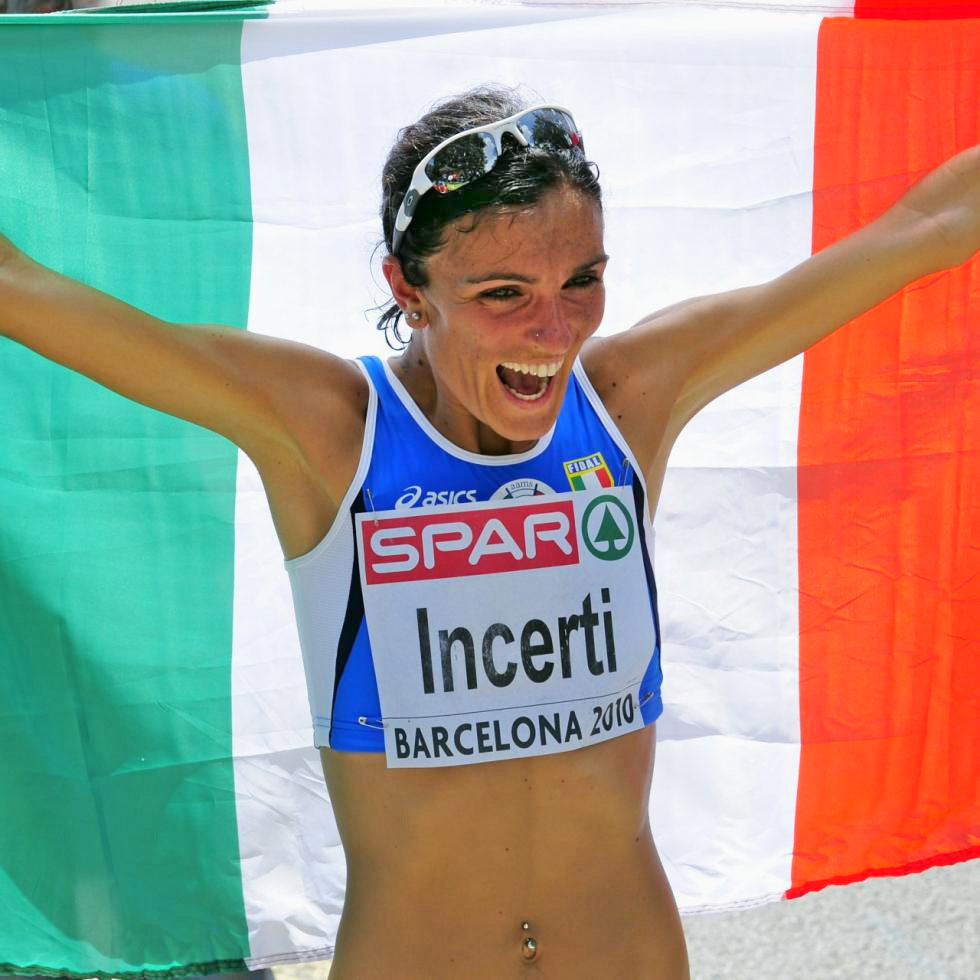
The Palermitan Anna Incerti 3rd at the finish, received the gold medal two years later for two athletes doping disqualification.

Medal	Athlete	Event
1st place, gold medalist(s)	Alex Schwazer	Men's 20 km walk
1st place, gold medalist(s)	Anna Incerti	Women's marathon
2nd place, silver medalist(s)	Roberto Donati; Simone Collio; Emanuele Di Gregorio; Maurizio Checcucci	Men's 4 × 100 m relay
2nd place, silver medalist(s)	Nicola Vizzoni	Men's hammer throw
2nd place, silver medalist(s)	Simona La Mantia	Women's triple jump
3rd place, bronze medalist(s)	Daniele Meucci	Men's 10,000 m
3rd place, bronze medalist(s)	Libania Grenot	Women's 400 m
3rd place, bronze medalist(s)	Chiara Bazzoni; Marta Milani; Maria Enrica Spacca; Libania Grenot	Women's 4 × 400 m relay

=== Medals awarded years later after doping cases ===
Incerti, third at the finish line, won gold medal after the disqualification of first two athletes two years later. Živilė Balčiūnaitė of Lithuania originally won the marathon and was awarded the gold medal, but was disqualified for doping after she tested positive for testosterone. Nailiya Yulamanova of Russia originally came second, and was set to be upgraded to gold winner after Živilė Balčiūnaitė was disqualified. However, in July 2012, Yulamanova was also disqualified for doping, as her results from 20 August 2009 onwards were annulled due to abnormalities in her biological passport profile. Anna Incerti (gold), Tetyana Filonyuk (silver) and Isabellah Andersson (bronze) received the medals by mail.

Edition	New medal	Finished	Event	Athlete	Disqualified athlete (position)	Years for decision-making	Notes
(Spain) 2010 Barcelona	1st place, gold medalist(s)	2nd place, silver medalist(s)	Men's 20 km race walk	Alex Schwazer	(Russia) Stanislav Emelyanov (original 1st)	4	
(Spain) 2010 Barcelona	1st place, gold medalist(s)	3rd place, bronze medalist(s)	Women's marathon	Anna Incerti	(Lithuania) Živilė Balčiūnaitė (original 1st) (Russia) Nailya Yulamanova (original 2nd)	1 (became 2nd); 2 (became 1st)	
(Spain) 2010 Barcelona	3rd place, bronze medalist(s)	4th	Women's 4 × 400 m relay	Chiara Bazzoni; Marta Milani; Maria Enrica Spacca; Libania Grenot	Russia (original 1st)	2	
(Spain) 2010 Barcelona	3rd place, bronze medalist(s)	4th	Women's 400 m	Libania Grenot	(Russia) Tatiana Firova (original 1st)	9	

== Participants ==
Event	Men	Women
100 m	Fabio Cerutti; Simone Collio; Emanuele Di Gregorio	Manuela Levorato
200 m	Matteo Galvan	Giulia Arcioni
400 m	Andrea Barberi; Claudio Licciardello; Marco Vistalli	Marta Milani; Libania Grenot
800 m	Giordano Benedetti; Lukas Rifesser; Mario Scapini	Elisa Cusma; Daniela Reina
1500 m	Christian Obrist	
5000 m	Stefano La Rosa; Daniele Meucci	Elena Romagnolo
10,000 m	Andrea Lalli; Daniele Meucci	Federica Dal Rì
Marathon	Ottaviano Andriani; Stefano Baldini; Migidio Bourifa; Daniele Caimmi; Denis Curzi; Ruggero Pertile	Rosaria Console; Anna Incerti; Deborah Toniolo
110/100 m hurdles	Stefano Tedesco	Marzia Caravelli
400 m hurdles	Giacomo Panizza	Manuela Gentili
High Jump	Filippo Campioli; Silvano Chesani; Marco Fassinotti	Antonietta Di Martino; Raffaella Lamera
Pole Vault	Giuseppe Gibilisco; Giorgio Piantella	Elena Scarpellini
Long Jump	Andrew Howe; Emanuele Formichetti; Stefano Tremigliozzi	
Triple Jump	Fabrizio Donato; Fabrizio Schembri; Daniele Greco	Simona La Mantia
Shot Put		Chiara Rosa
Discus Throw		Laura Bordignon
Hammer Throw	Nicola Vizzoni	Silvia Salis
Javelin Throw		Zahra Bani
20 km walk	Ivano Brugnetti; Giorgio Rubino; Alex Schwazer	Sibilla Di Vincenzo
50 km walk	Marco De Luca; Alex Schwazer	
4 × 100 m relay	Simone Collio; Emanuele Di Gregorio; Roberto Donati; Giovanni Tomasicchio; Jacques Riparelli; Maurizio Checcucci	Manuela Levorato; Giulia Arcioni; Audrey Alloh; Jessica Paoletta; Martina Giovanetti; Tiziana M. Grasso
4 × 400 m relay	Matteo Galvan; Andrea Barberi; Claudio Licciardello; Marco Vistalli; Luca Galletti; Domenico Fontana	Marta Milani; Libania Grenot; Chiara Bazzoni; Maria Enrica Spacca; Elena Bonfanti

== See also ==
- Italy national athletics team
