= Italy at the 1990 European Athletics Championships =

- WA code: ITA

in (Socialist Federal Republic of Yugoslavia) Split 26 August 1990 – 2 September 1990
- Medals Ranked 4th: Gold 5 Silver 2 Bronze 5 Total 12

European Athletics Championships appearances (overview)
- 1934; 1938; 1946; 1950; 1954; 1958; 1962; 1966; 1969; 1971; 1974; 1978; 1982; 1986; 1990; 1994; 1998; 2002; 2006; 2010; 2012; 2014; 2016; 2018; 2022; 2024

Italy competed at the 1990 European Athletics Championships in Split, Yugoslavia, from 26 August to 2 September 1990.

In this edition of the European championships, Italy reached (updated to 2018), the best ranking with the 4th place, like Prague 1978, and the maximum number of medals total (12) and gold medals won (5).

== Medalists ==
Medal	Athlete	Event
1st place, gold medalist(s)	Salvatore Antibo	Men's 5000 m
1st place, gold medalist(s)	Salvatore Antibo	Men's 10,000 m
1st place, gold medalist(s)	Gelindo Bordin	Men's marathon
1st place, gold medalist(s)	Francesco Panetta	Men's 3000 m
1st place, gold medalist(s)	Annarita Sidoti	Women's 10 km walk
2nd place, silver medalist(s)	Gennaro Di Napoli	Men's 1500 m
2nd place, silver medalist(s)	Gianni Poli	Men's marathon
3rd place, bronze medalist(s)	Stefano Mei	Men's 10,000 m
3rd place, bronze medalist(s)	Alessandro Lambruschini	Men's 3000 m steeplechase
3rd place, bronze medalist(s)	Mario Longo; Ezio Madonia; Sandro Floris; Stefano Tilli	Men's 4 × 100 m relay
3rd place, bronze medalist(s)	Roberta Brunet	Women's 3000 m
3rd place, bronze medalist(s)	Ileana Salvador	Women's 10 km walk

== Top eight ==
=== Men ===
Athlete	100 m	200 m	400 m	800 m	1500 m	5000 m	10,000 m	110 m hs	400 m hs	3000 m st	4×100 m relay	4×400 m relay	Marathon	20 km walk	50 km walk	High jump	Pole vault	Long jump	Triple jump	Shot put	Discus throw	Hammer throw	Javelin throw	Decathlon
Stefano Tilli		4																						
Sandro Floris		8																						
Tonino Viali				6																				
Giuseppe D'Urso				7																				
Gennaro Di Napoli					2nd place, silver medalist(s)																			
Salvatore Antibo						1st place, gold medalist(s)	1st place, gold medalist(s)																	
Stefano Mei						7	3rd place, bronze medalist(s)																	
Francesco Panetta										1st place, gold medalist(s)														
Alessandro Lambruschini										3rd place, bronze medalist(s)														
Angelo Carosi										4														
Relay team Mario Longo; Ezio Madonia; Sandro Floris; Stefano Tilli											3rd place, bronze medalist(s)													
Relay team Andrea Montanari; Vito Petrella; Roberto Ribaud; Andrea Nuti												4												
Gelindo Bordin													1st place, gold medalist(s)											
Gianni Poli													2nd place, silver medalist(s)											
Salvatore Bettiol													4											
Walter Arena														6										
Giovanni De Benedictis														8										
Gianni Perricelli															7									
Sandro Bellucci															8									
Luca Toso																8								
Giovanni Evangelisti																		7						
Enrico Sgrulletti																						7		

=== Women ===
Athlete	100 m	200 m	400 m	800 m	1500 m	3000 m	10,000 m	100 m hs	400 m hs	4×100 m relay	4×400 m relay	Marathon	10 km walk	High jump	Long jump	Shot put	Discus throw	Javelin throw	Heptathlon
Roberta Brunet						3rd place, bronze medalist(s)													
Nadia Dandolo							5												
Relay team Annarita Balzani; Maria Ruggeri; Daniela Ferrian; Rossella Tarolo											5								
Emma Scaunich												4							
Annarita Sidoti													1st place, gold medalist(s)						
Ileana Salvador													3rd place, bronze medalist(s)						

== See also ==
- Italy national athletics team
