= Italy at the 1982 European Athletics Championships =

- WA code: ITA

in (Greece) Athens
- Medals Ranked 6th: Gold 1 Silver 2 Bronze 2 Total 5

European Athletics Championships appearances (overview)
- 1934; 1938; 1946; 1950; 1954; 1958; 1962; 1966; 1969; 1971; 1974; 1978; 1982; 1986; 1990; 1994; 1998; 2002; 2006; 2010; 2012; 2014; 2016; 2018; 2022; 2024

Italy competed at the 1982 European Athletics Championships in Athens, Greece, from 6 to 12 September 1982.

== Medalists ==
Medal	Athlete	Event
1st place, gold medalist(s)	Alberto Cova	Men's 10,000 m
2nd place, silver medalist(s)	Pierfrancesco Pavoni	Men's 100 m
2nd place, silver medalist(s)	Laura Fogli	Women's marathon
3rd place, bronze medalist(s)	Gabriella Dorio	Women's 1500 m
3rd place, bronze medalist(s)	Sara Simeoni	Women's high jump

== Top eight ==
=== Men ===
Athlete	100 m	200 m	400 m	800 m	1500 m	5000 m	10,000 m	110 m hs	400 m hs	3000 m st	4×100 m relay	4×400 m relay	Marathon	20 km walk	50 km walk	High jump	Pole vault	Long jump	Triple jump	Shot put	Discus throw	Hammer throw	Javelin throw	Decathlon
Pierfrancesco Pavoni	2nd place, silver medalist(s)																							
Alberto Cova							1st place, gold medalist(s)																	
Salvatore Antibo							6																	
Mariano Scartezzini										6														
Relay team Pierfrancesco Pavoni; Giovanni Bongiorni; Luciano Caravani; Carlo Simionato											4													
Relay team Pietro Mennea; Roberto Tozzi; Roberto Ribaud; Mauro Zuliani												6												
Giampaolo Messina													8											
Alessandro Pezzatini														5										
Carlo Mattioli														6										
Giovanni Evangelisti																		6						
Roberto Mazzucato																			8					

=== Women ===
Athlete	100 m	200 m	400 m	800 m	1500 m	3000 m	100 m hs	400 m hs	4×100 m relay	4×400 m relay	Marathon	High jump	Long jump	Shot put	Discus throw	Javelin throw	Heptathlon
Gabriella Dorio					3rd place, bronze medalist(s)												
Margherita Gargano						7											
Relay team Daniela Ferrian; Carla Mercurio; Marisa Masullo; Erika Rossi									6								
Laura Fogli											2nd place, silver medalist(s)						
Alba Milana											4						
Sara Simeoni												3rd place, bronze medalist(s)					

== See also ==
- Italy national athletics team
