= Italy at the 1978 European Athletics Championships =

- WA code: ITA

in (Czechoslovakia) Prague
- Competitors: 43
- Medals: Gold 4 Silver 1 Bronze 0 Total 5

European Athletics Championships appearances (overview)
- 1934; 1938; 1946; 1950; 1954; 1958; 1962; 1966; 1969; 1971; 1974; 1978; 1982; 1986; 1990; 1994; 1998; 2002; 2006; 2010; 2012; 2014; 2016; 2018; 2022; 2024; 2026

Italy took 43 competitors to the 1978 European Athletics Championships which took place 29 August–3 September 1978 in Prague. Italy took five medals during the championships.

== Medalists ==
Medal	Name	Event
1st place, gold medalist(s)	Pietro Mennea	Men's 100m
1st place, gold medalist(s)	Pietro Mennea	Men's 200m
1st place, gold medalist(s)	Venanzio Ortis	Men's 5000m
1st place, gold medalist(s)	Sara Simeoni	Women's high jump
2nd place, silver medalist(s)	Venanzio Ortis	Men's 10,000m

== Top eight ==
=== Men ===
Athlete	100 m	200 m	400 m	800 m	1500 m	5000 m	10,000 m	110 m hs	400 m hs	3000 m st	4×100 m relay	4×400 m relay	Marathon	20 km walk	50 km walk	High jump	Pole vault	Long jump	Triple jump	Shot put	Discus throw	Hammer throw	Javelin throw	Decathlon
Pietro Mennea	1st place, gold medalist(s)	1st place, gold medalist(s)																						
Venanzio Ortis						1st place, gold medalist(s)	2nd place, silver medalist(s)																	
Giuseppe Buttari								4																
Relay team Giovanni Grazioli; Luciano Caravani; Stefano Curini; Pietro Mennea											5													
Relay team Roberto Tozzi; Daniele Zanini; Stefano Malinverni; Pietro Mennea												7												
Massimo Magnani													6											
Maurizio Damilano														6										
Roberto Buccione														8										
Vittorio Visini															6									
Sandro Bellucci															7									
Edoardo Podberscek																						7		
Giampaolo Urlando																						8		

=== Women ===
Athlete	100 m	200 m	400 m	800 m	1500 m	3000 m	100 m hs	400 m hs	4×100 m relay	4×400 m relay	High jump	Long jump	Shot put	Discus throw	Javelin throw	Pentathlon
Gabriella Dorio					6											
Sara Simeoni											1st place, gold medalist(s)					
