= Italy at the 1974 European Athletics Championships =

- WA code: ITA

in (Italy) Rome 2 September 1974 – 8 September 1974
- Medals Ranked 8th: Gold 1 Silver 2 Bronze 2 Total 5

European Athletics Championships appearances (overview)
- 1934; 1938; 1946; 1950; 1954; 1958; 1962; 1966; 1969; 1971; 1974; 1978; 1982; 1986; 1990; 1994; 1998; 2002; 2006; 2010; 2012; 2014; 2016; 2018; 2022; 2024

Italy competed at the 1974 European Athletics Championships in Rome, Norway, from 2 to 8 September 1974.

== Medalists ==
Medal	Athlete	Event
1st place, gold medalist(s)	Pietro Mennea	200 m
2nd place, silver medalist(s)	Pietro Mennea	100 m
2nd place, silver medalist(s)	Vincenzo Guerini; Norberto Oliosi; Luigi Benedetti; Pietro Mennea	4x400 m relay
3rd place, bronze medalist(s)	Giuseppe Cindolo	10,000 m
3rd place, bronze medalist(s)	Sara Simeoni	High jump

== Top eight ==
=== Men ===
Athlete	100 m	200 m	400 m	800 m	1500 m	5000 m	10,000 m	110 m hs	400 m hs	3000 m st	4×100 m relay	4×400 m relay	Marathon	20 km walk	50 km walk	High jump	Pole vault	Long jump	Triple jump	Shot put	Discus throw	Hammer throw	Javelin throw	Decathlon
Pietro Mennea	2nd place, silver medalist(s)	1st place, gold medalist(s)																						
Marcello Fiasconaro				6																				
Giuseppe Cindolo							3rd place, bronze medalist(s)						7											
Giuseppe Buttari								6																
Franco Fava										4														
Relay team Vincenzo Guerini; Norberto Oliosi; Luigi Benedetti; Pietro Mennea											2nd place, silver medalist(s)													
Armando Zambaldo														4										
Sandro Bellucci														7										
Vittorio Visini															4									
Rodolfo Bergamo																8								
Armando De Vincentiis																					7			

=== Women ===
Athlete	100 m	200 m	400 m	800 m	1500 m	3000 m	100 m hs	4×100 m relay	4×400 m relay	High jump	Long jump	Shot put	Discus throw	Javelin throw	Pentathlon
Paola Pigni						5									
Sara Simeoni										3rd place, bronze medalist(s)					
Relay team Maura Gnecchi; Adriana Carli; Laura Nappi; Cecilia Molinari								7							

== See also ==
- Italy national athletics team
