= Italy at the 2002 European Athletics Championships =

- WA code: ITA

in (Germany) Munich 6 August 2002 – 11 August 2002
- Medals Ranked 16th: Gold 1 Silver 0 Bronze 3 Total 4

European Athletics Championships appearances (overview)
- 1934; 1938; 1946; 1950; 1954; 1958; 1962; 1966; 1969; 1971; 1974; 1978; 1982; 1986; 1990; 1994; 1998; 2002; 2006; 2010; 2012; 2014; 2016; 2018; 2022; 2024

Italy competed at the 2002 European Athletics Championships in Munich, Germany, from 6 to 11 August 2002.

== Medalists ==
Medal	Athlete	Event
1st place, gold medalist(s)	Maria Guida	Women's marathon
3rd place, bronze medalist(s)	Manuela Levorato	Women's 100 m
3rd place, bronze medalist(s)	Manuela Levorato	Women's 200 m
3rd place, bronze medalist(s)	Erica Alfridi	Women's 20 km race walk

== See also ==
- Italy national athletics team
