= Italy at the 1954 European Athletics Championships =

- WA code: ITA

in (Switzerland) Bern 25 August 1954 – 29 August 1954
- Competitors: 24
- Medals Ranked 8th: Gold 1 Silver 1 Bronze 1 Total 3

European Athletics Championships appearances (overview)
- 1934; 1938; 1946; 1950; 1954; 1958; 1962; 1966; 1969; 1971; 1974; 1978; 1982; 1986; 1990; 1994; 1998; 2002; 2006; 2010; 2012; 2014; 2016; 2018; 2022; 2024

Italy competed at the 1954 European Athletics Championships in Bern, Switzerland, from 25 to 29 August 1954.

== Medalists ==
Medal	Athlete	Event
1st place, gold medalist(s)	Adolfo Consolini	Men's discus throw
2nd place, silver medalist(s)	Giuseppe Tosi	Men's discus throw
3rd place, bronze medalist(s)	Maria Musso; Giuseppina Leone; Letizia Bertoni; Milena Greppi	Women's 4×100 metres relay

== Top eight ==
=== Men ===
Athlete	100 m	200 m	400 m	800 m	1500 m	5000 m	10,000 m	110 m hs	400 m hs	3000 m st	4×100 m relay	4×400 m relay	Marathon	50 km walk	High jump	Pole vault	Long jump	Triple jump	Shot put	Discus throw	Hammer throw	Javelin throw	Decathlon
Vincenzo Lombardo			8																				
Armando Filiput									8														
Relay team Wolfgango Montanari; Sergio D'Asnasch; Lucio Sangermano; Luigi Gnocchi											5												
Abdon Pamich														7									
Attilio Bravi																	7						
Adolfo Consolini																				1st place, gold medalist(s)			
Giuseppe Tosi																				2nd place, silver medalist(s)			

=== Women ===
Athlete	100 m	200 m	80 m hs	4×100 m relay	High jump	Long jump	Shot put	Discus throw	Javelin throw	Pentathlon
Giusy Leone	4									
Relay team Maria Musso; Giusy Leone; Letizia Bertoni; Milena Greppi				3rd place, bronze medalist(s)						

== See also ==
- Italy national athletics team
