= Italy at the 1938 European Athletics Championships =

- WA code: ITA

in (France) Paris (men) (Austria) Vienna (women)
- Medals Ranked 7th: Gold 1 Silver 4 Bronze 3 Total 8

European Athletics Championships appearances (overview)
- 1934; 1938; 1946; 1950; 1954; 1958; 1962; 1966; 1969; 1971; 1974; 1978; 1982; 1986; 1990; 1994; 1998; 2002; 2006; 2010; 2012; 2014; 2016; 2018; 2022; 2024

Italy competed at the 1938 European Athletics Championships in Paris, France, from 3 to 5 September (men) and after in Vienna, Austria from 17 to 18 September (women).

== Medalists ==
Medal	Athlete	Event
1st place, gold medalist(s)	Claudia Testoni	Women's 80 m hs
2nd place, silver medalist(s)	Orazio Mariani	Men's 100 m
2nd place, silver medalist(s)	Giuseppe Beviacqua	Men's 10,000 m
2nd place, silver medalist(s)	Arturo Maffei	Men's long jump
2nd place, silver medalist(s)	Giorgio Oberweger	Men's discus throw
3rd place, bronze medalist(s)	Mario Lanzi	Men's 800 m
3rd place, bronze medalist(s)	Luigi Beccali	Men's 1500 m
3rd place, bronze medalist(s)	Maria Alfero; Maria Apollonio; Rosetta Cattaneo; Italia Lucchini	Women's 4 × 100 m relay

== Top eight ==
=== Men (Paris) ===
Athlete	100 m	200 m	400 m	800 m	1500 m	5000 m	10,000 m	110 m hs	400 m hs	3000 m st	4×100 m relay	4×400 m relay	Marathon	50 km walk	High jump	Pole vault	Long jump	Triple jump	Shot put	Discus throw	Hammer throw	Javelin throw	Decathlon
Orazio Mariani	2nd place, silver medalist(s)																						
Mario Lanzi				3rd place, bronze medalist(s)																			
Luigi Beccali					3rd place, bronze medalist(s)																		
Giuseppe Beviacqua							2nd place, silver medalist(s)																
Giuseppe Russo									7														
Ferdinando Migliaccio										7													
Relay team Tullio Gonnelli; Gianni Caldana; Edoardo Daelli; Orazio Mariani											4												
Relay team Angelo Ferrario; Gioacchino Dorascenzi; Otello Spampani; Mario Lanzi												5											
Umberto De Florentis													8										
Antonio De Maestri														5									
Giuseppe Gobbato														7									
Mario Romeo																5							
Arturo Maffei																	2nd place, silver medalist(s)						
Vittorio Turco																		5					
Franco Bini																		7					
Angiolo Profeti																			7				
Giorgio Oberweger																				2nd place, silver medalist(s)			
Adolfo Consolini																				5			

=== Women (Vienna) ===
Athlete	100 m	200 m	80 m hs	4×100 m relay	High jump	Long jump	Shot put	Discus throw	Javelin throw
Claudia Testoni			1st place, gold medalist(s)						
Relay team Maria Alfero; Maria Apollonio; Rosetta Cattaneo; Italia Lucchini				3rd place, bronze medalist(s)					
Gabre Gabric								6	

== See also ==
- Italy national athletics team
