= Italy at the 1958 European Athletics Championships =

- WA code: ITA

in (Sweden) Stockholm 19 August 1958 – 24 August 1958
- Competitors: 35
- Medals Ranked 11th: Gold 0 Silver 1 Bronze 0 Total 1

European Athletics Championships appearances (overview)
- 1934; 1938; 1946; 1950; 1954; 1958; 1962; 1966; 1969; 1971; 1974; 1978; 1982; 1986; 1990; 1994; 1998; 2002; 2006; 2010; 2012; 2014; 2016; 2018; 2022; 2024

Italy competed at the 1958 European Athletics Championships in Stockholm, Sweden, from 19 to 24 August 1958.

== Medalists ==
Medal	Athlete	Event
2nd place, silver medalist(s)	Abdon Pamich	Men's 50 km walk

== Top eight ==
=== Men ===
Athlete	100 m	200 m	400 m	800 m	1500 m	5000 m	10,000 m	110 m hs	400 m hs	3000 m st	4×100 m relay	4×400 m relay	Marathon	20 km walk	50 km walk	High jump	Pole vault	Long jump	Triple jump	Shot put	Discus throw	Hammer throw	Javelin throw	Decathlon
Giorgio Mazza								5																
Relay team Pier Giorgio Cazzola; Sergio D'Asnasch; Livio Berruti; Giorgio Mazza											6													
Relay team Nereo Fossati; Mario Fraschini; Giovanni Scavo; Renato Panciera												4												
Edoardo Righi													8											
Pino Dordoni														6										
Abdon Pamich															2nd place, silver medalist(s)									
Attilio Bravi																		4						
Silvano Meconi																				5				
Adolfo Consolini																					6			
Giovanni Lievore																							8	

=== Women ===
Athlete	100 m	200 m	400 m	800 m	80 m hs	4×100 m relay	High jump	Long jump	Shot put	Discus throw	Javelin throw	Pentathlon
Giusy Leone	5											
Maria Musso					8							
Relay team Sandra Valenti; Letizia Bertoni; Maria Musso; Giusy Leone						5						

== See also ==
- Italy national athletics team
