= Gesualdo Penna =

Italian sprinter

Personal information
- National team: Italy: 7 caps (1949-1951)
- Born: 16 August 1924 Reggio Calabria, Italy
- Died: 25 September 2000 (aged 76) ?

Sport
- Sport: Athletics
- Event: Sprinting
- Club: GA Polimeni Reggio Calabria

Achievements and titles
- Personal best: 100 m: 10.5 (1949)

Gesualdo "Aldo" Penna (27 May 1924 – 25 September 2000) was an Italian sprinter, who was 8th in the 100 m at the 1950 European Athletics Championships.

National champion at senior level in 100 m in 1949.

== Achievements ==
Year	Competition	Venue	Rank	Event	Time	Notes
1950	European Championships	(Belgium) Brussels	8th	100 m	11.0	

== Honors ==
- Italian National Olympic Committee (CONI) Star at the sporting merit

== See also ==
- Italy at the 1950 European Athletics Championships
