= Italy at the 1969 European Athletics Championships =

- WA code: ITA

in (Greece) Athens 16 September 1969 – 21 September 1969
- Competitors: 36
- Medals Ranked 9th: Gold 1 Silver 0 Bronze 3 Total 4

European Athletics Championships appearances (overview)
- 1934; 1938; 1946; 1950; 1954; 1958; 1962; 1966; 1969; 1971; 1974; 1978; 1982; 1986; 1990; 1994; 1998; 2002; 2006; 2010; 2012; 2014; 2016; 2018; 2022; 2024

Italy competed at the 1969 European Athletics Championships in Athens, Greece, from 16 to 21 September 1969.

== Medalists ==
Medal	Athlete	Event
1st place, gold medalist(s)	Eddy Ottoz	Men's 110 m hs
3rd place, bronze medalist(s)	Erminio Azzaro	Men's high jump
3rd place, bronze medalist(s)	Aldo Righi	Men's pole vault
3rd place, bronze medalist(s)	Paola Pigni	Women's 1500 m

== Top eight ==
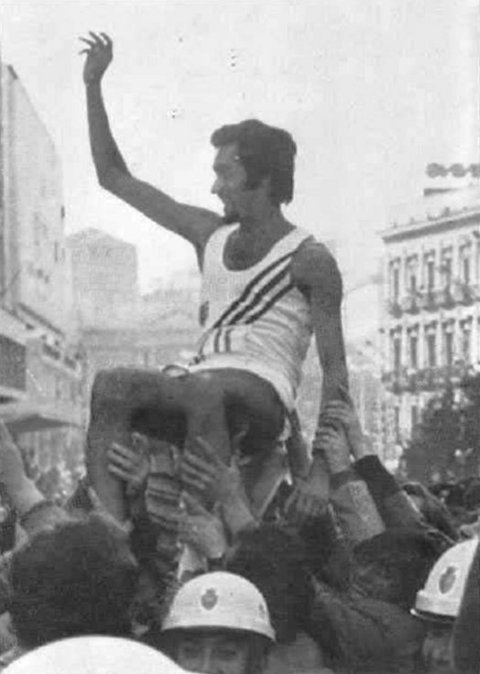
Giuseppe Ardizzone one of the biggest Sicilians competitors in athletics. 8th in 5000 m.

=== Men ===
Athlete	100 m	200 m	400 m	800 m	1500 m	5000 m	10,000 m	110 m hs	400 m hs	3000 m st	4×100 m relay	4×400 m relay	Marathon	20 km walk	50 km walk	High jump	Pole vault	Long jump	Triple jump	Shot put	Discus throw	Hammer throw	Javelin throw	Decathlon
Pasqualino Abeti		7																						
Sergio Bello			8																					
Franco Arese					8																			
Giuseppe Ardizzone						6																		
Eddy Ottoz								1st place, gold medalist(s)																
Sergio Liani								8																
Giorgio Ballati									8															
Relay team Giorgio Rietti; Ennio Preatoni; Angelo Squazzero; Francesco Zandano											8													
Relay team Claudio Trachelio; Sergio Bello; Giacomo Puosi; Furio Fusi												5												
Abdon Pamich														6										
Erminio Azzaro																3rd place, bronze medalist(s)								
Aldo Righi																	3rd place, bronze medalist(s)							
Giuseppe Gentile																			7					

=== Women ===
Athlete	100 m	200 m	400 m	800 m	1500 m	100 m hs	4×100 m relay	High jump	Long jump	Shot put	Discus throw	Javelin throw	Pentathlon
Donata Govoni			6										
Paola Pigni					3rd place, bronze medalist(s)								

== See also ==
- Italy national athletics team
