= Laura Gotti =

Italian long-distance runner

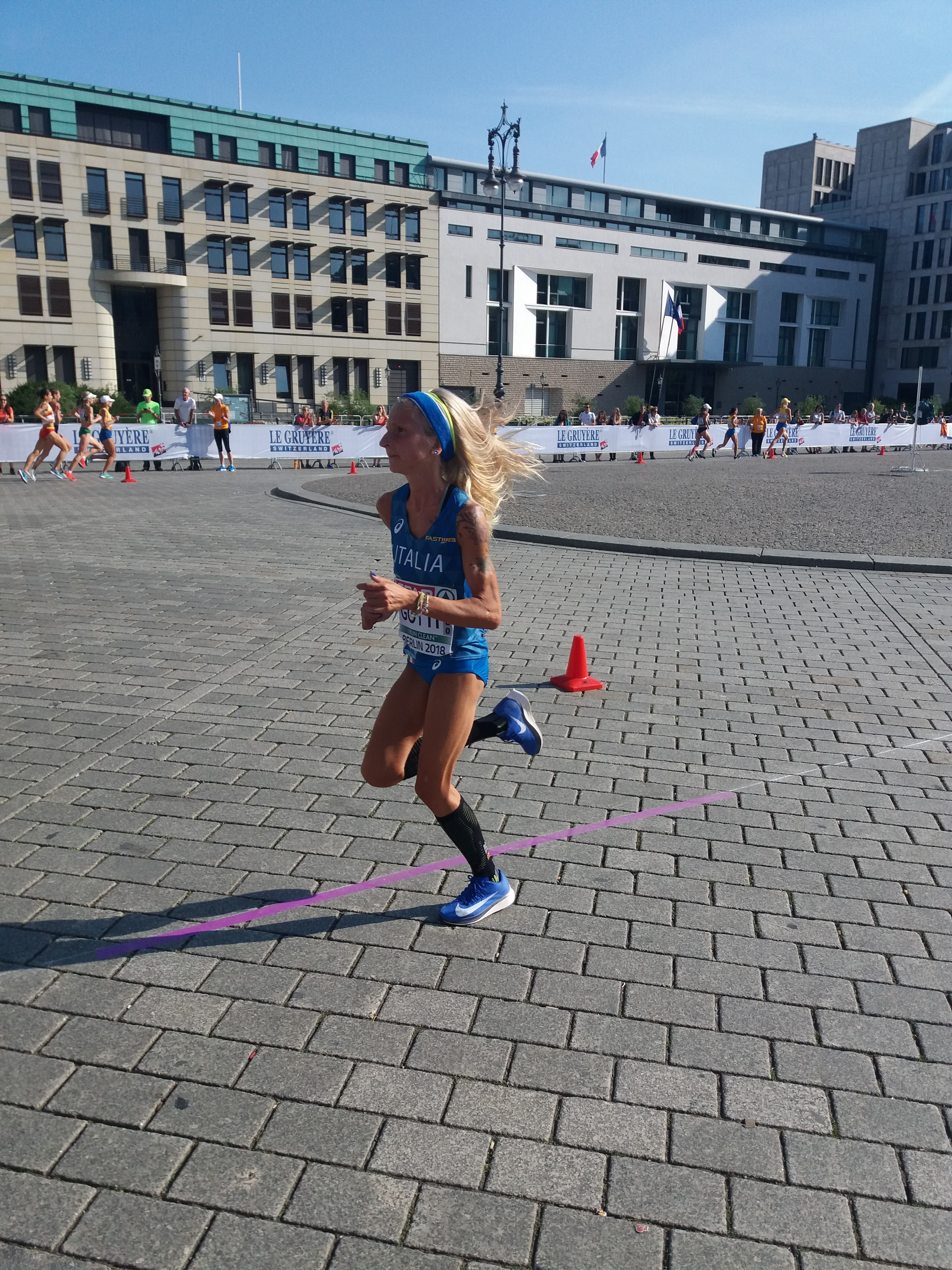
- Laura Gotti at Berlin 2018 marathon

Personal information
- Nationality: Italian
- Born: 14 June 1991 (age 35) Iseo, Italy
- Height: 1.65 m (5 ft 5 in)
- Weight: 44 kg (97 lb)

Sport
- Country: Italy
- Sport: Athletics
- Event: Long-distance running
- Club: Runners Capriolese
- Coached by: Luigi Ferraris

Achievements and titles
- Personal best: Marathon: 2:33:22 (2018)

Laura Gotti (born 14 June 1991) is a female Italian long-distance runner who won a silver medal at the 2018 European Athletics Championships.

== Biography ==
Laura Gotti in 2018 was able to qualify for the European Athletics Championships and won the silver medal in the team competition, despite having closed the marathon race in 46th and last position, more than half an hour from the predecessor who had preceded he, by virtue of the EAA rules that rewards the medal for all the athletes who have arrived at the finish line, even if the team's time is calculated only by the sum of the first three athletes of the team who are part of the finish line.

== Achievements ==
Year	Competition	Venue	Position	Event	Time	Notes
2018	European Championships	(Germany) Berlin	46th	Marathon	3:34:13	
2018	European Championships	(Germany) Berlin	2nd	Marathon Team	7:32:46	

== See also ==
- Italy at the 2018 European Athletics Championships
