= Italy at the 1994 European Athletics Championships =

- WA code: ITA

in (Finland) Helsinki 7 August 1994 – 14 August 1994
- Medals Ranked 8th: Gold 2 Silver 3 Bronze 3 Total 8

European Athletics Championships appearances (overview)
- 1934; 1938; 1946; 1950; 1954; 1958; 1962; 1966; 1969; 1971; 1974; 1978; 1982; 1986; 1990; 1994; 1998; 2002; 2006; 2010; 2012; 2014; 2016; 2018; 2022; 2024

Italy competed at the 1994 European Athletics Championships in Helsinki, Finland, from 7 to 14 August 1994.

== Medalists ==
Medal	Athlete	Event
1st place, gold medalist(s)	Andrea Benvenuti	800 m
1st place, gold medalist(s)	Alessandro Lambruschini	3000 m steeplechase
2nd place, silver medalist(s)	Angelo Carosi	3000 m steeplechase
2nd place, silver medalist(s)	Maria Curatolo	Marathon
2nd place, silver medalist(s)	Annarita Sidoti	10 km race walk
3rd place, bronze medalist(s)	Giovanni Perricelli	50 km race walk
3rd place, bronze medalist(s)	Ezio Madonia; Domenico Nettis; Giorgio Marras; Sandro Floris	4x100 m relay
3rd place, bronze medalist(s)	Fiona May	Long jump

== See also ==
- Italy national athletics team
