= Italy at the 1962 European Athletics Championships =

- WA code: ITA

in (Socialist Federal Republic of Yugoslavia) Belgrade 12 September 1962 – 16 September 1962
- Competitors: 36
- Medals Ranked 7th: Gold 2 Silver 1 Bronze 1 Total 4

European Athletics Championships appearances (overview)
- 1934; 1938; 1946; 1950; 1954; 1958; 1962; 1966; 1969; 1971; 1974; 1978; 1982; 1986; 1990; 1994; 1998; 2002; 2006; 2010; 2012; 2014; 2016; 2018; 2022; 2024; 2026

Italy competed at the 1962 European Athletics Championships in Belgrade, Yugoslavia, from 12 to 16 September 1962.

== Medalists ==
Medal	Athlete	Event
1st place, gold medalist(s)	Salvatore Morale	Men's 400 m hs
1st place, gold medalist(s)	Abdon Pamich	Men's 50 km walk
2nd place, silver medalist(s)	Giovanni Cornacchia	Men's 110 m hs
3rd place, bronze medalist(s)	Sergio Ottolina	Men's 200 m hs

== Top eight ==
=== Men ===
Athlete	100 m	200 m	400 m	800 m	1500 m	5000 m	10,000 m	110 m hs	400 m hs	3000 m st	4×100 m relay	4×400 m relay	Marathon	20 km walk	50 km walk	High jump	Pole vault	Long jump	Triple jump	Shot put	Discus throw	Hammer throw	Javelin throw	Decathlon
Livio Berruti	8																							
Sergio Ottolina		3rd place, bronze medalist(s)																						
Giovanni Cornacchia								2nd place, silver medalist(s)																
Giorgio Mazza								5																
Salvatore Morale									1st place, gold medalist(s)															
Relay team Livio Berruti; Sergio Ottolina; Armando Sardi; Flavio Colani											5													
Relay team Mario Fraschini; Vittorio Barberis; Gian Paolo Iraldo; Salvatore Morale												5												
Abdon Pamich															1st place, gold medalist(s)									
Carmelo Rado																					8			
Carlo Lievore																							6	

=== Women ===
Athlete	100 m	200 m	400 m	800 m	80 m hs	4×100 m relay	High jump	Long jump	Shot put	Discus throw	Javelin throw	Pentathlon
Letizia Bertoni					7							
Relay team Donata Govoni; Daniela Spampani; Letizia Bertoni; Nadia Mecocci						5						

== See also ==
- Italy national athletics team
