= Italy at the 2012 European Athletics Championships =

- WA code: ITA

in (Finland) Helsinki
- Medals: Gold 1 Silver 1 Bronze 1 Total 3

European Athletics Championships appearances (overview)
- 1934; 1938; 1946; 1950; 1954; 1958; 1962; 1966; 1969; 1971; 1974; 1978; 1982; 1986; 1990; 1994; 1998; 2002; 2006; 2010; 2012; 2014; 2016; 2018; 2022; 2024

Italy will be represented at the 2012 European Athletics Championships held in Helsinki by the athletes that have achieved the standard of participation fixed by FIDAL.

== Medalists ==
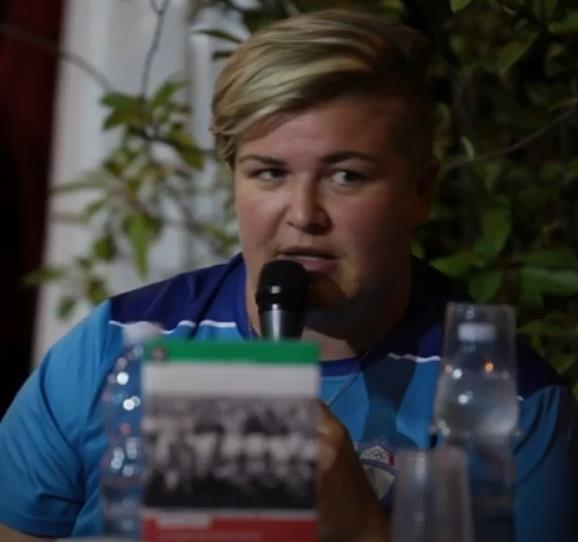
Chiara Rosa bronze medal in the shot put.

Medal	Athlete	Event
1st place, gold medalist(s)	Fabrizio Donato	Men's triple jump
2nd place, silver medalist(s)	Daniele Meucci	Men's 10,000 m
3rd place, bronze medalist(s)	Chiara Rosa	Women's shot put

== Team ==
Are qualified the athletes who have achieved the standard set by the Italian Federation of Athletics (maximum three athletes for event). The events of race walking and marathon will be not disputed at Helsinki, because the races is too close to the 2012 Summer Olympics of London.

On June 18, after a few defections to injury, the federal technicians (particularly the manager Francesco Uguagliati of the national team) informed the final list of 61 participants (33 men and 28 women).

Men
Event	Performance required	Qualified
100 m	10.28 s	Jacques Riparelli 10"24; Fabio Cerutti 10"24; Simone Collio 10"27
200 m	20"80	Davide Manenti 20"76; Diego Marani 20"77
400 m	46"00	Marco Vistalli 45"70; Lorenzo Valentini 46"49
800 m	1'47"00	Mario Scapini 1'46"95
1500 m	3'40"00	Abdellah Haidane 3'39"11
5000 m	13'35"00	Stefano La Rosa 13'23"58; Maksym Obrubanskyy 13'27"15
10000 m	28'30"00	Daniele Meucci 27'32"86; Stefano La Rosa 28'13"62
110 m hs	13"70	Emanuele Abate 13"28; Paolo Dal Molin 13"64
400 m hs	50"00	José Bencosme 50"05
3000 m st	8'30"00	Yuri Floriani 8'22"62; Patrick Nasti 8'29"08
High jump	2.28 m	Silvano Chesani 2.31 m Gianmarco Tamberi 2.26 m
Pole vault	5.60 m	Claudio Stecchi 5.60 m Marco Boni 5.60 m
Long jump	8.00 m	
Triple jump	16.70 m	Daniele Greco 17.47 m Fabrizio Donato 17.28 m Fabrizio Schembri 16.97 m Andrea Chiari 16.83 m
Shot put	19.90 m	
Discus throw	62.90 m	Giovanni Faloci 64.24 m
Hammer throw	76.00 m	Lorenzo Povegliano 79.08 m Nicola Vizzoni 76.17 m Marco Lingua 76.10 m
Javelin throw	79.70 m	
Decathlon	7800 pt	
4×100 m relay		Emanuele Di Gregorio
4×400 m relay		Andrea Barberi; Claudio Licciardello; Isalbet Juarez; Luca Galletti

Women
Event	Performance required	Qualified
100 m	11"45	Martina Amidei 11"42; Audrey Alloh 11"43
200 m	23"30	Gloria Hooper 23"21
400 m	52"80	Libania Grenot 50"92; Maria Enrica Spacca 52"73; Chiara Bazzoni 52"80
800 m	2'01"90	
1500 m	4'09"80	
5000 m	15'30"00	Silvia Weissteiner 15'18"04; Elena Romagnolo 15'19"78
10000 m	33'00"00	Nadia Ejjafini 31'45"14; Valeria Straneo 32'15"87; Elena Romagnolo 32'39"12
100 m hs	13"25	Marzia Caravelli 12"85; Veronica Borsi 13"05; Giulia Pennella 13"06; Micol Cattaneo 13"07
400 m hs	56"30	Manuela Gentili 55"58
3000 m st	9'50"00	Giulia Martinelli 9'48"01
High jump	1.92 m	Antonietta Di Martino 1.95 m Alessia Trost 1.92 m
Pole vault	4.40 m	Anna Giordano Bruno 4.40 m
Long jump	6.55 m	
Triple jump	14.00 m	Simona La Mantia 14.29 m
Shot put	16.70 m	Chiara Rosa 18.63 m Julaika Nicoletti 17.13 m
Discus throw	58.00 m	Tamara Apostolico 59.50 m Laura Bordignon 58.77 m
Hammer throw	68.50 m	Silvia Salis 70.20 m
Javelin throw	57.50 m	Zahra Bani 59.43 m
Eptathlon	5920 pt	
4x100 m relay		Ilenia Draisci; Martina Giovanetti; Jessica Paoletta
4x400 m relay		Giulia Arcioni; Elena Maria Bonfanti; Marta Milani

== Results ==
=== Finalists (top 8) ===
Athlete	Event	Position	Performance	Notes
Daniele Meucci	5000 m	5th	13:32.69	
Nadia Ejjafini	5000 m	6th	15:16.54	
Simone Collio	100 m	DSQ	-	
Chiara Rosa	Shot put	3rd	18.47 m	
Gianmarco Tamberi	High jump	5th	2.24 m	
Yuri Floriani	3000 m st.	7th	8:39.22	
Abdellah Haidane	1500 m	8th	3:47.79	
Simona La Mantia	Triple jump	4th	14.25 m	
Marco Vistalli	400 m	8th	4:04.20	
Libania Grenot	400 m	6th	52.57	
Fabrizio Donato	Triple jump	1st	17.63 m	
Daniele Meucci	10000 m	2nd	28:22.73	
Nicola Vizzoni	Hammer throw	5th	75.13 m	
Diego Marani	200 m	7th	21.26	
Marzia Caravelli	100 m hs	6th	13.11	
Micol Cattaneo	100 m hs	8th	13.16	
Claudio Stecchi	Pole vault	8th	5.40 m	
Emanuele Abate	110 m hs	5th	13.43	

== See also ==
- Athletics in Italy
- Italy national athletics team
- Italy at the 2012 Summer Olympics - Athletics
