= Eyob Faniel =

Eritrean-born Italian long-distance runner

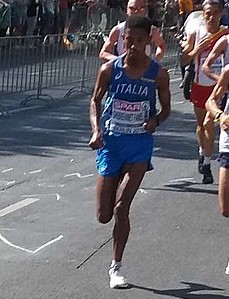
- Faniel in 2018

Personal information
- Full name: Eyob Ghebrehiwet Faniel
- Born: 26 November 1992 (age 33) Asmara, Ethiopia
- Height: 1.74 m (5 ft 9 in)
- Weight: 53 kg (117 lb)

Sport
- Country: Italy
- Sport: Athletics
- Event: Long-distance running
- Club: G.S. Fiamme Oro
- Coached by: Ruggero Pertile

Achievements and titles
- Personal bests: Half marathon: 1:00:07 (2021); Marathon: 2:07:09 (2024)
Medal record
European Championships
Gold medal – first place	2018 Berlin	Marathon Cup
Mediterranean Games
Silver medal – second place	2018 Tarragona	Half marathon
European 10,000m Cup
Silver medal – second place	2017 Minsk	Team

Eyob Ghebrehiwet Faniel (born 26 November 1992) is an Italian long-distance runner who won a silver medal at the 2018 Mediterranean Games. He is a former national record holder in the marathon with a time of 2:07:19, set on 23 February 2020, at the 2020 Seville Marathon. He finished 20th at the 2020 Summer Olympics, in the Marathon.

== Biography ==
Faniel came to Italy in 2004, he was naturalized in 2015 at 23.

In 2017, he won the Venice Marathon when its top runners were mistakenly diverted from the main course by the marathon's staff.

In 2019, he competed in the men's marathon at the 2019 World Athletics Championships held in Doha, Qatar. He finished in 15th place.

In November 2021, he finished in 3rd place in the 2021 New York City Marathon with a time of 2:09:52.

== National records ==
- Half marathon: 1:00:07 ( (Italy) Siena, 28 February 2021) - former holder
- Marathon: 2:07:19 ( (Spain) Seville, 23 February 2020) - former holder

== Achievements ==
Year	Competition	Venue	Position	Event	Time	Notes
2017	Venice Marathon	(Italy) Venice	1st	Marathon	2:12:16	
2018	World Half Marathon Championships	(Spain) Valencia	37th	Half marathon	1:02:37	PB
2018	Mediterranean Games	(Spain) Tarragona	2nd	Half marathon	1:04.07	
2018	European Championships	(Germany) Berlin	5th	Marathon	2:12:43	SB
2018	European Championships	(Germany) Berlin	1st	Marathon Cup	6:40:48	
2019	World Championships	(Qatar) Doha	15th	Marathon	2:13:57	SB
2021	New York City Marathon	(United States) New York City	3rd	Marathon	2:09:52	

== Personal bests ==
- Half marathon: 1:00:07, (Italy) Siena, 26 January 2020
- Marathon: 2:07:09, (Spain) Seville, 18 February 2024

== See also ==
- National records in the marathon
- Men's marathon Italian record progression
- List of Italian records in athletics
- Italian all-time lists - Marathon
- Italian all-time lists - Half marathon
- Italian team at the running events
- Italy at the 2018 European Athletics Championships
- Italy at the 2018 Mediterranean Games
- Naturalized athletes of Italy
