= 1946 European Athletics Championships – Men's long jump =

Men's long jump at the European Athletics Championships

The men's long jump at the 1946 European Athletics Championships was held in Oslo, Norway, at Bislett Stadion on 24 August 1946.

== Medalists ==
Gold	Olle Laessker; Sweden
Silver	Lucien Graff; Switzerland
Bronze	Miroslav Řihošek; Czechoslovakia

== Results ==
=== Final ===
24 August

Rank	Name	Nationality	Result	Notes
1st place, gold medalist(s)	Olle Laessker	Sweden	7.42	
2nd place, silver medalist(s)	Lucien Graff	Switzerland	7.40	
3rd place, bronze medalist(s)	Miroslav Řihošek	Czechoslovakia	7.29	NR
4	Egidio Pribetti	Italy	7.28	
5	Stig Håkansson	Sweden	6.97	
6	Denis Watts	Great Britain	6.95	
7	Zdeněk Matys	Czechoslovakia	6.92	
8	Oliver Steinn Johannsson	Iceland	6.82	

=== Qualification ===
24 August

Rank	Name	Nationality	Result	Notes
1	Olle Laessker	Sweden	7.18	Q
2	Lucien Graff	Switzerland	7.09	Q
3	Egidio Pribetti	Italy	7.08	Q
4	Oliver Steinn Johannsson	Iceland	7.06	Q
5	Denis Watts	Great Britain	7.00	Q
6	Miroslav Řihošek	Czechoslovakia	6.98	Q
7	Stig Håkansson	Sweden	6.94	Q
8	Zdeněk Matys	Czechoslovakia	6.78	Q
9	Mees Naaktgeboren	Netherlands	6.77	
10	Jean Studer	Switzerland	6.74	
11	Björn Vilmundarson	Iceland	6.69	
12	Armand Bour	France	6.58	
13	Léopold Delcour	Belgium	6.56	
14	Preben Larsen	Denmark	6.53	

== Participation ==
According to an unofficial count, 14 athletes from 10 countries participated in the event.

- Belgium (1)
- Czechoslovakia (2)
- Denmark (1)
- France (1)
- Iceland (2)
- Italy (1)
- Netherlands (1)
- Sweden (2)
- Switzerland (2)
- Great Britain (1)
