= Placing table =

Team ranking system in sports

A placing table is a team ranking system used in sports competitions that feature multiple finals. It shares similarities with the better-known medal table found at most multi-sport events, but goes beyond the top three performers and assigns weighted scores to each athlete based on their overall final placing, then aggregates the scores of all athletes in a team to provide a final team standing. This system is most commonly found in the sport of athletics: both the International Association of Athletics Federations (IAAF) and European Athletics release placing tables for the major championships they organise. A typical system awards a decreasing number of points for the top eight finishers, with eight points for first place, down to one point for eighth place. Non-finishers and disqualified athletes typically receive zero points.

The advantage of a placing table over a traditional medal table is that it is a better indicator of the overall quality of a team – medal tables demonstrate a ranking bias in favour of teams with a small number of very high quality performers over larger teams with fewer medallists but a greater number of finalists. Another advantage is that placing tables are less affected by post-competition doping disqualifications, as reassignment of a points score is a simple technical adjustment compared to the minting and re-presentation of physical medals.

Several high profile international athletics competitions are contested via a placing table format, with no individual medals awarded. Major competitions of this type are the IAAF Continental Cup (formed as the IAAF World Cup in 1977), the European Team Championships (formed as the European Cup in 1965), the European Champion Clubs Cup (first held in 1975), the DécaNation (created in 2005) and the Athletics World Cup (created in 2018). The European Athletics Indoor Cup, held from 2003 to 2008, is the highest level indoor track and field competition to have used a placing table system. The ranking system was already in use in athletics at the start of the 20th century, being the deciding factor in the Finland-Sweden Athletics International since 1925.

A small-scale version of a placing table is found in cross country running, where the team standing of a single race is decided by the aggregate placings of each team's athletes. An alternative team scoring system exemplified by the European Throwing Cup is a performance-based team score, where each athlete's individual performance is converted into a score via a standardised points table and the team score is the aggregate of these performance scores, similar to a decathlon.

== See also ==
- Group tournament ranking system
- World Athletics Championships all-time placing table
- IAAF World Indoor Championships all-time placing table
- IAAF World Rankings
