= Mario Lambrughi =

Italian hurdler (born 1992)

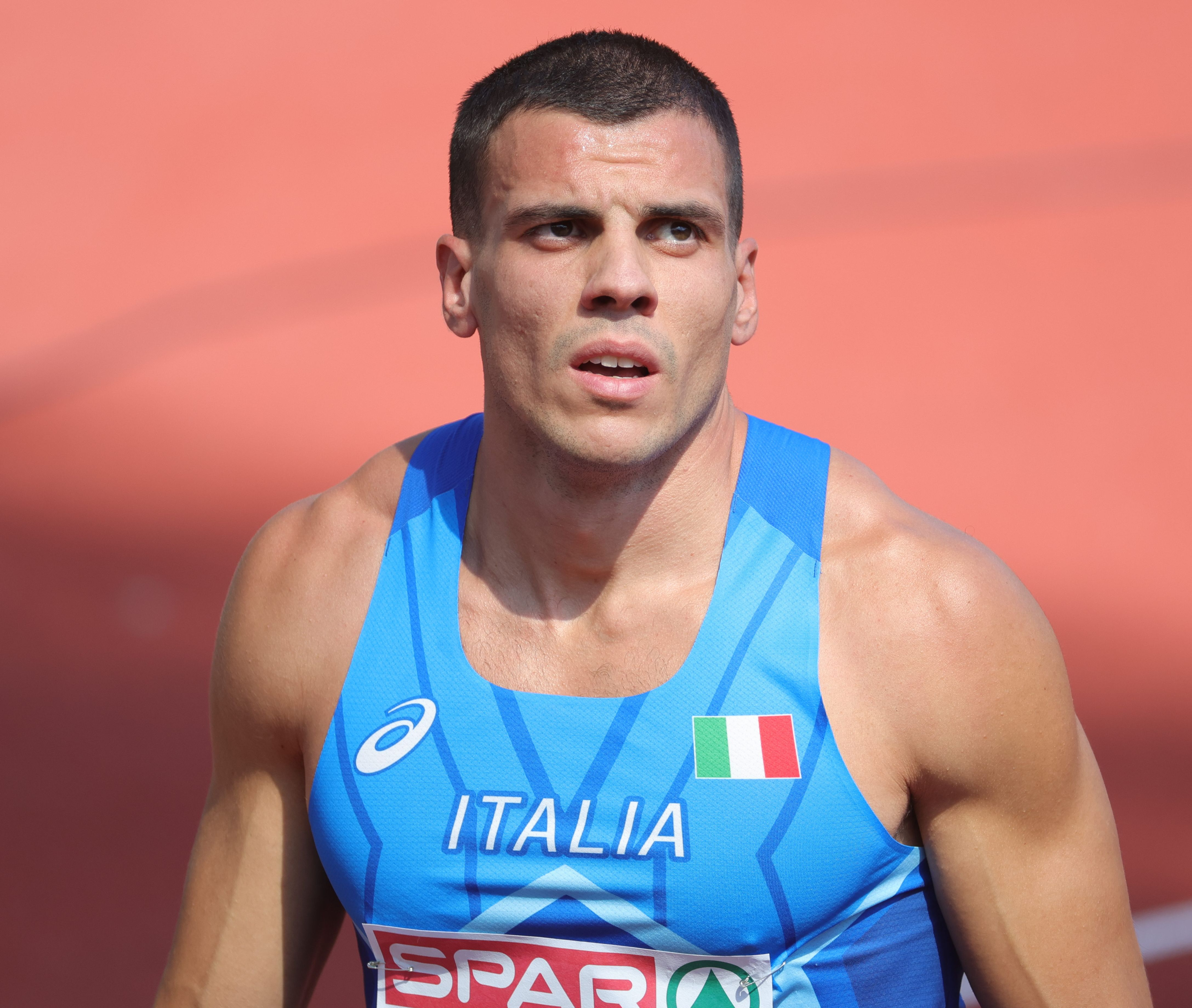
- Lambrughi in Munich 2022

Personal information
- Nationality: Italian
- Born: 5 February 1992 (age 34) Monza
- Height: 1.84 m (6 ft 0 in)
- Weight: 75 kg (165 lb)

Sport
- Country: Italy
- Sport: Athletics
- Event: 400 metres hurdles
- Club: Atletica Riccardi

Achievements and titles
- Personal best: 400 metres hurdles: 48.99 (2018)

Mario Lambrughi (born 5 February 1992) is an Italian male hurdler. In 2018, establishing his Personal Best with 48.99, at 13 May 2018 had reached the 1st place in the seasonal European lists.

== Personal best ==
- 400 metres hurdles: 48.99 - (Italy) Rieti, 13 May 2018

== National titles ==
- Italian Athletics Championships
  - 400 metres hurdles: 2019, 2022

== See also ==
- Italian all-time lists - 400 metres hurdles
