= Athletics at the 1952 Summer Olympics – Women's shot put =

Women's shot put at the Games of the XV Olympiad
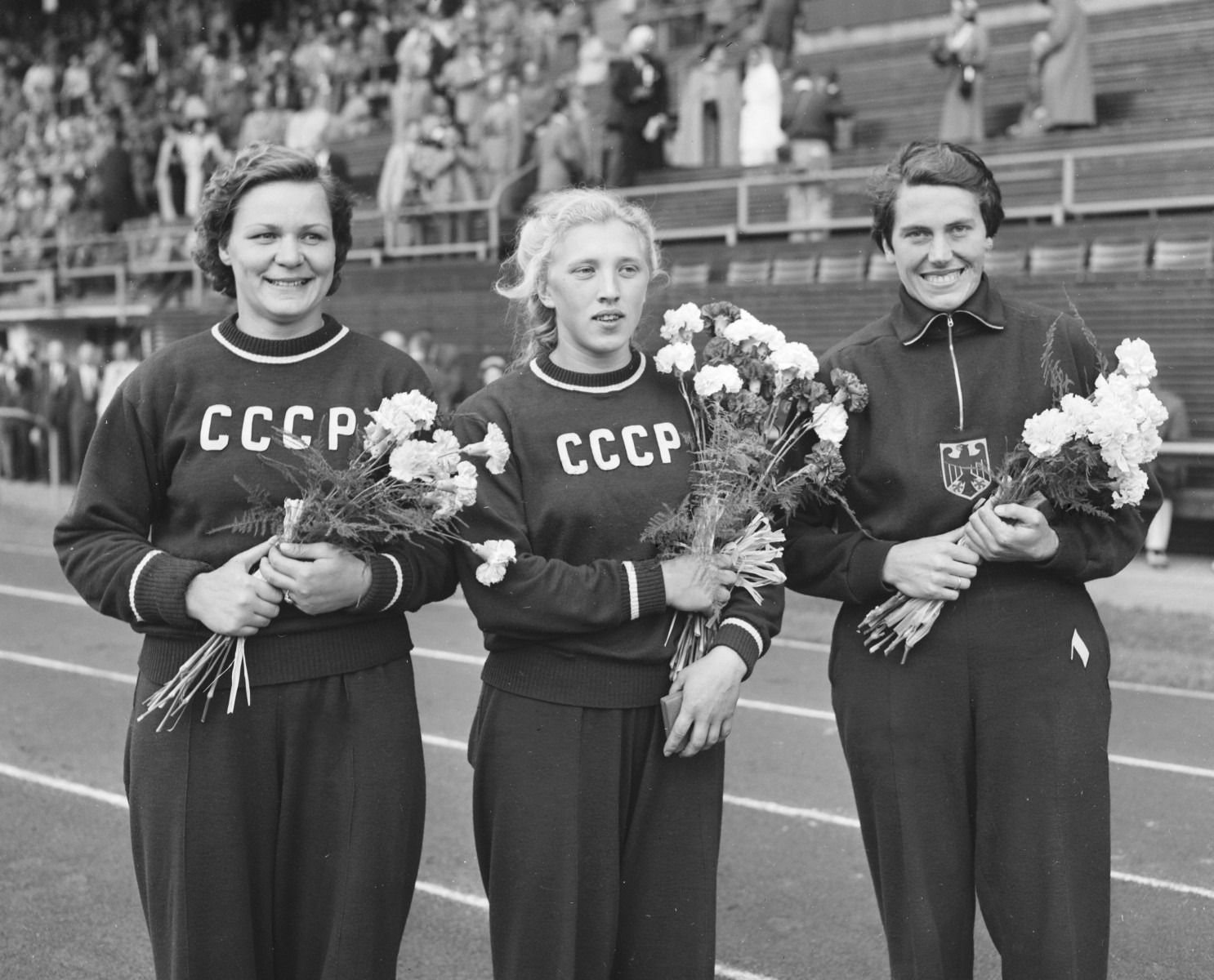
- Left-right: Tochonova, Zybina, Werner
- Venue: Helsinki Olympic Stadium
- Dates: 26 July 1952
- Competitors: 20 from 13 nations
- Winning distance: 15.28 WR

Medalists
1st place, gold medalist(s)		Galina Zybina	Soviet Union
2nd place, silver medalist(s)		Marianne Werner	Germany
3rd place, bronze medalist(s)		Klavdiya Tochonova	Soviet Union

The women's shot put event at the 1952 Summer Olympics took place on 26 July at the Helsinki Olympic Stadium. Soviet athlete Galina Zybina won the gold medal and set new world and Olympic records.

== Medalists ==
Gold	Galina Zybina (URS)
Silver	Marianne Werner (GER)
Bronze	Klavdiya Tochonova (URS)

== Results ==
=== Qualifying round ===
Qualification: Qualifying Performance 12.30 advance to the Final.

Rank	Athlete	Nationality	Result
1	Klavdiya Tochonova	Soviet Union	13.88 OR
2	Gertrud Kille	Germany	13.71
3	Galina Zybina	Soviet Union	13.66
4	Marianne Werner	Germany	13.62
5	Marija Radosavljević	Yugoslavia	13.15
6	Magdalena Breguła	Poland	13.05
7	Paulette Veste	France	12.91
8	Tamara Tyshkevich	Soviet Union	12.76
9	Eivor Olson	Sweden	12.70
10	Yvette Williams	New Zealand	12.64
11	Dorothea Kreß	Germany	12.57
12	Jaroslava Křítková	Czechoslovakia	12.57
12	Meeri Saari	Finland	12.57
14	Nada Kotlušek	Yugoslavia	12.35
15	Ingeborg Pfüller	Argentina	11.85
16	Elżbieta Krysińska	Poland	11.50
17	Gretel Bolliger	Switzerland	11.48
18	Janet Dicks	United States	11.44
19	Ingeborg Mello	Argentina	10.82
20	Choi Myeong-suk	South Korea	10.76
	Agnes Olsen	Denmark	DNS
	Raayah Ron	Israel	DNS
	Lotte Haidegger	Austria	DNS
	Olga Winterberg	Israel	DNS
	Esther Brand	South Africa	DNS
	Toyoko Yoshino	Japan	DNS

=== Final ===
Rank	Athlete	Nationality	1	2	3	4	5	6	Result
1st place, gold medalist(s)	Galina Zybina	Soviet Union	15.00	14.58	14.04	14.55	14.33	15.28	15.28 WR
2nd place, silver medalist(s)	Marianne Werner	Germany	13.89	13.91	x	x	14.04	14.57	14.57
3rd place, bronze medalist(s)	Klavdiya Tochonova	Soviet Union	14.42	x	14.50	14.11	14.06	14.35	14.50
4	Tamara Tyshkevich	Soviet Union	14.42	14.13	13.57	14.00	13.45	13.88	14.42
5	Gertrud Kille	Germany	x	12.49	13.48	13.77	13.74	13.84	13.84
6	Yvette Williams	New Zealand	12.27	11.54	13.35	12.68	12.28	11.73	13.35
7	Marija Radosavljević	Yugoslavia	13.23	x	13.30				13.30
8	Meeri Saari	Finland	12.05	12.61	13.02				13.02
9	Paulette Veste	France	12.96	12.23	12.88				12.96
10	Magdalena Breguła	Poland	x	12.39	12.93				12.93
11	Dorothea Kreß	Germany	12.91	12.52	12.61				12.91
12	Jaroslava Křítková	Czechoslovakia	12.18	12.59	12.73				12.73
13	Eivor Olson	Sweden	12.46	11.28	12.05				12.46
14	Nada Kotlušek	Yugoslavia	11.98	x	11.76				11.98
