= Athletics at the 1948 Summer Olympics – Women's shot put =

Women's shot put at the Games of the XIV Olympiad
- Venue: Olympic Stadium
- Dates: 4 August 1948 (qualifying and final)
- Competitors: 19 from 12 nations
- Winning time: 13.750 OR

Medalists
1st place, gold medalist(s)		Micheline Ostermeyer; France
2nd place, silver medalist(s)		Amelia Piccinini; Italy
3rd place, bronze medalist(s)		Ine Schäffer; Austria

Video on YouTube Official Video @ 39:45

The women's shot put event was, for the first time, part of the track and field athletics programme at the 1948 Summer Olympics. The competition was held on 4 August 1948. The final was won by Micheline Ostermeyer of France.

Since it was the first time this event took place, the following new Olympic record was set during this competition:

Date	Event	Athlete	Time	Notes
4 August	Final	Micheline Ostermeyer (FRA)	13.75 m	OR

== Schedule ==
All times are British Summer Time (UTC+1)

Date	Time	Round
Wednesday 4 August 1948	11:00	Qualifications
Wednesday 4 August 1948	17:00	Finals

=== Qualifying round ===
Qual. rule: qualification standard 12.30m (Q) or at least best 12 qualified (q).

Rank	Name	Nationality	Result	Notes
1	Micheline Ostermeyer	France	13.140	Q OR
2	Eivor Olson	Sweden	12.620	Q
3	Bevis Reid	Great Britain	12.570	Q
4	Amelia Piccinini	Italy		Q
5	Ine Schäffer	Austria		Q
6	Paulette Veste	France		Q
7	Jaroslava Komárková	Czechoslovakia		Q
8	Anni Bruk	Austria		Q
9	Marija Radosavljević	Yugoslavia		Q
10	Ingeborg Mello	Argentina		Q
11	Paulette Laurent	France		Q
12	Marianne Schläger	Austria		Q
13	Elizabeth Müller	Brazil	11.870	
14	Frances Kaszubski	United States	11.310	
15	Ans Panhorst-Niesink	Netherlands	11.180	
16	Dorothy Dodson	United States	11.055	
17	Elspeth Whyte	Great Britain	10.755	
18	Liv Paulsen	Norway	10.200	
19	Margaret Birtwistle	Great Britain	9.740	
	Julija Matej	Yugoslavia	DNS	

=== Final standings ===
Rank	Name	Nationality	Distance	Notes
1st place, gold medalist(s)	Micheline Ostermeyer	France	13.750	OR
2nd place, silver medalist(s)	Amelia Piccinini	Italy	13.095	
3rd place, bronze medalist(s)	Ine Schäffer	Austria	13.080	
4	Paulette Veste	France	12.985	
5	Jaroslava Komárková	Czechoslovakia	12.920	
6	Anni Bruk	Austria	12.500	
7	Marija Radosavljević	Yugoslavia	12.355	
8	Bevis Reid	Great Britain	12.170	
9	Ingeborg Mello	Argentina	12.085	
10	Paulette Laurent	France	12.030	
11	Eivor Olson	Sweden	11.840	
12	Marianne Schläger	Austria	11.775	

Key: OR = Olympic record
