= Athletics at the 1952 Summer Olympics – Women's discus throw =

Women's discus throw at the Games of the XV Olympiad
- Venue: Helsinki Olympic Stadium
- Dates: July 20, 1952
- Competitors: 20 from 16 nations
- Winning distance: 51.42 OR

Medalists
1st place, gold medalist(s)		Nina Ponomaryova; Soviet Union
2nd place, silver medalist(s)		Yelizaveta Bagryantseva; Soviet Union
3rd place, bronze medalist(s)		Nina Dumbadze; Soviet Union

The Women's shot put event at the 1952 Summer Olympics took place on 20 July at the Helsinki Olympic Stadium. Russian athlete Nina Ponomaryova from Ural Oblast won the gold medal and set a new Olympic record.

== Medalists ==
Gold	Nina Ponomaryova (URS)
Silver	Yelisaveta Bagriantseva (URS)
Bronze	Nina Dumbadze (URS)

== Results ==
=== Qualifying round ===
Qualification: Qualifying Performance 36.00 advance to the Final.

Rank	Athlete	Nationality	Result
1	Nina Ponomaryova	Soviet Union	45.05
2	Nina Dumbadze	Soviet Union	43.20
3	Marianne Werner	Germany	41.37
4	Yvette Williams	New Zealand	41.32
5	Ingeborg Mello	Argentina	40.91
6	Yelisaveta Bagriantseva	Soviet Union	40.73
7	Libuše Nováková	Czechoslovakia	39.89
8	Toyoko Yoshino	Japan	39.75
9	Lotte Haidegger	Austria	39.54
10	Frieda Tiltsch	Austria	39.47
11	Gretel Bolliger	Switzerland	38.20
12	Dezsőné Józsa	Hungary	37.75
13	Lia Manoliu	Romania	37.58
14	Paulette Veste	France	37.47
15	Edera Cordiale	Italy	37.40
16	Ingeborg Pfüller	Argentina	36.61
17	Kaarina Koivuniemi	Finland	36.56
18	Suzanne Allday	Great Britain	36.37
19	Olga Winterberg	Israel	35.79
20	Esther Brand	South Africa	34.18
	Đurđa Boroveč	Yugoslavia	DNS

=== Final ===
Rank	Athlete	Nationality	1	2	3	4	5	6	Result
1st place, gold medalist(s)	Nina Ponomaryova	Soviet Union	45.16	50.84	51.42	47.24	44.66	49.37	51.42 OR
2nd place, silver medalist(s)	Yelisaveta Bagriantseva	Soviet Union	43.58	47.08	44.26	43.97	44.58	43.00	47.08
3rd place, bronze medalist(s)	Nina Dumbadze	Soviet Union	45.85	40.24	44.10	46.29	45.10	41.05	46.29
4	Toyoko Yoshino	Japan	41.71	42.67	37.15	41.58	43.81	42.02	43.81
5	Lotte Haidegger	Austria	35.66	43.49	40.02	x	x	41.32	43.49
6	Lia Manoliu	Romania	41.57	42.65	41.48	36.05	41.21	40.79	42.65
7	Ingeborg Pfüller	Argentina	37.05	40.32	41.73				41.73
8	Ilona Szikora-Józsá	Hungary	x	39.58	41.61				41.61
9	Marianne Werner	Germany	39.77	x	41.03				41.03
10	Yvette Williams	New Zealand	40.48	32.95	40.38				40.48
11	Kaarina Koivuniemi	Finland	40.33	32.72	40.05				40.33
12	Ingeborg Mello	Argentina	39.04	37.84	37.24				39.04
13	Libuše Nováková	Czechoslovakia	38.17	x	38.83				38.83
14	Edera Cordiale	Italy	38.22	x	37.03				38.22
15	Suzanne Allday	Great Britain	34.54	37.34	37.96				37.96
16	Paulette Veste	France	37.64	28.94	33.28				37.64
17	Gretel Bolliger	Switzerland	35.34	36.36	36.24				36.36
18	Frieda Tiltsch	Austria	x	27.84	x				27.84
