= Tatyana Sevryukova =

Soviet shot putter

Medal record

Women's athletics

Representing the Soviet Union

European Championships
Gold medal – first place	1946 Oslo	Shot put

Tatyana Nikitichna Sevryukova (Russian: Татья́на Ники́тична Севрюко́ва; 30 June 1917 – 1981) was a Soviet track and field athlete who competed mainly in the shot put. She was the gold medallist at the 1946 European Athletics Championships and broke the world record for the event in 1948.

== Career ==
=== Early career ===
Born in Tashkent in the Uzbek SSR, she was a member of various sports clubs during her career with the main ones being Moscow-based: Spartak from 1937 to 1945 and Dynamo Sports Club from 1946 to 1952. She was trained by Oleg Lakerbay and Dmitri Markov during those periods. As a teenager she quickly established herself among the best shot putters in the world, with a throw of 13.40 m (43 ft 11 1/2 in) in 1935. A mark of 13.62 m (44 ft 8 in) the year after was the best during that wartime year and she also ranked number one in 1943 and 1944. She placed herself at the peak of the sport nationally with wins at the Soviet Athletics Championships in 1939 and 1940, then again in 1944 and 1945. With the end of World War II she added nearly a metre to her personal best in October 1945 with a throw of 14.51 m (47 ft 7 1/4 in), then improved further to 14.89 m (48 ft 10 in) later that month. This was better than the official IAAF women's shot put world record, but because the Soviet Union was not an IAAF member at that point the marks were not officially recognised.

=== European champion ===
The 1946 season was Sevryukova's first full season in peacetime and she proved to be the world's best shot putter. She ranked number one globally with her season's best of 14.25 m (46 ft 9 in) and won her fifth Soviet title. The 1946 European Athletics Championships was her first major international competition and she was a comfortable winner by more than a metre ahead of minor medallists Micheline Ostermeyer and Amelia Piccinini – her best of 14.16 m (46 ft 5 1/4 in) was a championship record. She was also entered into the discus throw event and was the third best qualifier before throwing shorter in the final and finishing sixth overall.

=== World record ===
Sevryukova ranked number one for two more years with marks of 14.61 m (47 ft 11 in) in 1947 and 14.77 m (48 ft 5 1/4 in) in 1948, making it six consecutive years as the world's number one. With the Soviet Union having given recognition to the Soviet Athletics Federation, she finally gained official status as the world record holder with a mark of 14.59 m (47 ft 10 1/4 in) in 1948, adding twenty one centimetre's to the previous best by Gisela Mauermayer. She achieved the mark at a competition especially organised as an alternative to the 1948 London Olympics, at which the Soviet's did not compete, and Sevryukova's mark was easily better than Ostermeyer's winning Olympic record throw. Her world record stood for a little over a year before Soviet rival Klavdiya Tochonova claimed the world record for herself, although it was not until 1950 that Anna Andreyeva improved the record beyond Sevryukova's unofficial best. Sevryukova also had unratified world indoor records in the shot put, with throws of 14.22 m (46 ft 7 3/4 in) and 14.47 m (47 ft 5 1/2 in) in February 1947, then 14.55 m (47 ft 8 3/4 in) in February 1948.

Sevryukova won her sixth and final national title at the 1947 Soviet Championships. She still ranked in the top three nationally in the three following years, with Anna Andreyeva and Klavdiya Tochonova placing above her at the national championships. The trio were the world's best, as reflected by their taking the top three spots on the global rankings from 1949 to 1951. The rise of two further throwers in 1952, Galina Zybina and Tamara Tyshkevich, saw Soviets occupy the top five spots and Sevryukova pushed down to fourth (her lowest placing since 1935). Ironically, Sevryukova achieved her career best mark that year, with a throw of 14.93 m (48 ft 11 3/4 in). She had her last top three world ranking at the age of 36 in 1953 before her performances declined. She retired after the 1955 season.

=== Legacy ===
Sevryukova's career set the stage for future Soviet dominance of the women's shot put. She was the first ever Soviet woman to win a major international gold medal in the event and also the first ever Soviet to hold the official world record for the discipline. After her world record in 1948, the mark remained exclusively in Soviet hands until 1968: Tochonova, Andreyeva, Zybina, Tamara Press and Nadezhda Chizhova were the successive holders. Natalya Lisovskaya regained the title for the Soviets in 1984 and she remains the world record holder.

The Soviet Union was similarly dominant at major international competitions: after Sevryukova's European gold in 1946, only two athletes from outside the Soviet Union (Marianne Werner and Margitta Gummel) managed to win an Olympic or European gold medal in the thirty years after that.

== Personal bests ==
- Shot put: 14.93 m (48 ft 11 3/4 in) (1952)
- Shot put indoor: 14.55 m (47 ft 8 3/4 in) (1948)
- Discus throw: 41.74 m (136 ft 11 1/4 in) (1939)

== National titles ==
- Soviet Athletics Championships
  - Shot put: 1939, 1940, 1944, 1945, 1946, 1947

== International competitions ==
Year	Competition	Venue	Position	Event	Notes
1946	European Championships	Oslo, Norway	1st	Shot put	14.16 m CR
1946	European Championships	Oslo, Norway	6th	Discus throw	34.05 m

Records
Preceded by Gisela Mauermayer	Women's shot put world record holder 4 August 1948 – 30 October 1949	Succeeded by Klavdiya Tochonova
