= 1950 European Athletics Championships – Women's shot put =

Women's shot put at the European Athletics Championships

The women's shot put at the 1950 European Athletics Championships was held in Brussels, Belgium, at Heysel Stadium on 23 August 1950.

== Medalists ==
Gold	Anna Andreyeva; Soviet Union
Silver	Klavdiya Tochenova; Soviet Union
Bronze	Micheline Ostermeyer; France

== Results ==
=== Final ===
23 August

Rank	Name	Nationality	Result	Notes
1st place, gold medalist(s)	Anna Andreyeva	Soviet Union	14.32	CR
2nd place, silver medalist(s)	Klavdiya Tochenova	Soviet Union	13.92	
3rd place, bronze medalist(s)	Micheline Ostermeyer	France	13.37	
4	Galina Zybina	Soviet Union	13.07	
5	Magdalena Breguła	Poland	12.80	
6	Marija Radosavljević	Yugoslavia	12.75	
7	Amelia Piccinini	Italy	12.40	
8	Nada Kotlušek	Yugoslavia	12.34	
9	Jaroslava Jungrová	Czechoslovakia	12.20	
10	Paulette Veste	France	12.19	
11	Eivor Olson	Sweden	11.90	
12	Nicole Oosterlynck	Belgium	9.93	

== Participation ==
According to an unofficial count, 12 athletes from 8 countries participated in the event.

- Belgium (1)
- Czechoslovakia (1)
- France (2)
- Italy (1)
- Poland (1)
- Soviet Union (3)
- Sweden (1)
- Yugoslavia (2)
