= 1954 European Athletics Championships – Women's discus throw =

Discus throwing competition

Women's discus throw at the European Athletics Championships

The women's discus throw at the 1954 European Athletics Championships was held in Bern, Switzerland, at Stadion Neufeld on 27 August 1954.

== Medalists ==
Gold	Nina Ponomaryova; Soviet Union
Silver	Irina Beglyakova; Soviet Union
Bronze	Galina Zybina; Soviet Union

== Results ==
=== Final ===
27 August

Rank	Name	Nationality	Result	Notes
1st place, gold medalist(s)	Nina Ponomaryova	Soviet Union	48.02	
2nd place, silver medalist(s)	Irina Beglyakova	Soviet Union	45.79	
3rd place, bronze medalist(s)	Galina Zybina	Soviet Union	44.77	
4	Štěpánka Mertová	Czechoslovakia	44.37	
5	Jiřina Vobořilová	Czechoslovakia	44.33	
6	Julija Matej	Yugoslavia	43.95	
7	Lia Manoliu	Romania	43.86	
8	Karen Sonneck	West Germany	43.86	
9	Zsuzsa Serédi	Hungary	42.15	
10	Anni Pöll	Austria	41.45	
11	Marianne Werner	West Germany	41.36	
12	Jolanda Mayr	West Germany	39.65	
13	Helena Dmowska	Poland	39.44	
14	Simone Saenen	Belgium	39.37	
15	Dezsőné Józsa	Hungary	37.98	
16	Gretel Bolliger	Switzerland	37.45	
17	Herlinde Peyker	Austria	33.43	

== Participation ==
According to an unofficial count, 17 athletes from 10 countries participated in the event.

- Austria (2)
- Belgium (1)
- Czechoslovakia (2)
- Hungary (2)
- Poland (1)
- Romania (1)
- Soviet Union (3)
- Switzerland (1)
- West Germany (3)
- Yugoslavia (1)
