= 1946 European Athletics Championships – Women's shot put =

European Athletics Championships

Women's shot put at the European Athletics Championships

The women's shot put at the 1946 European Athletics Championships was held in Oslo, Norway, at Bislett Stadium on 22 August 1946.

== Medalists ==
Gold	Tatyana Sevryukova; Soviet Union
Silver	Micheline Ostermeyer; France
Bronze	Amelia Piccinini; Italy

== Results ==
=== Final ===
22 August

Rank	Name	Nationality	Result	Notes
1st place, gold medalist(s)	Tatyana Sevryukova	Soviet Union	14.16	CR
2nd place, silver medalist(s)	Micheline Ostermeyer	France	12.84	
3rd place, bronze medalist(s)	Amelia Piccinini	Italy	12.21	
4	Jadwiga Wajs	Poland	11.65	
5	Eivor Olson	Sweden	11.43	
6	Ans Niesink	Netherlands	11.35	
7	Maria Kwaśniewska	Poland	11.06	
8	Liv Paulsen	Norway	10.37	
9	Jaroslava Komárková	Czechoslovakia	10.11	
10	Kathleen Dyer-Tilley	Great Britain	9.83	
11	Stella Møllgaard	Denmark	9.75	
12	Aase Kjølseth	Norway	9.73	
	Gretel Bolliger	Switzerland	NM	
	Stanisława Walasiewicz	Poland	NM	
	Soňa Reichová	Czechoslovakia	NM	

== Participation ==
According to an unofficial count, 15 athletes from 11 countries participated in the event.

- Czechoslovakia (2)
- Denmark (1)
- France (1)
- Italy (1)
- Netherlands (1)
- Norway (2)
- Poland (3)
- Soviet Union (1)
- Sweden (1)
- Switzerland (1)
- Great Britain (1)
