= Athletics at the 1948 Summer Olympics – Women's discus throw =

Women's discus throw at the Games of the XIV Olympiad
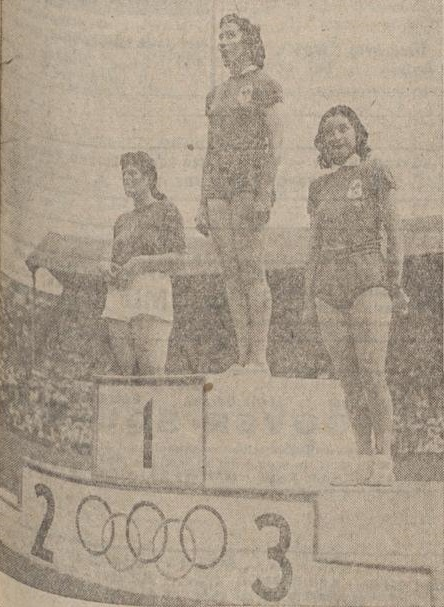
- Podium of the women's discus throw
- Venue: Olympic Stadium
- Dates: July 30, 1948 (final)
- Competitors: 21 from 11 nations
- Winning distance: 41.92

Medalists
1st place, gold medalist(s)		Micheline Ostermeyer; France
2nd place, silver medalist(s)		Edera Gentile; Italy
3rd place, bronze medalist(s)		Jacqueline Mazeas; France

Video on YouTube Official Video @ 10:15

The women's discus throw event was part of the track and field athletics programme at the 1948 Summer Olympics. The competition was held on July 30, 1948. The final was won by Micheline Ostermeyer of France.

== Records ==
Prior to the competition, the existing World and Olympic records were as follows.

World record	Gisela Mauermayer (GER)	48.31 m	Berlin, Germany	11 July 1936
Olympic record	Gisela Mauermayer (GER)	47.63 m	Berlin, Germany	4 August 1936

== Schedule ==
All times are British Summer Time (UTC+1)

Date	Time	Round
Friday, 30 July 1948	15:30	Finals

== Results ==
=== Final standings ===
Rank	Name	Nationality	Distance	Notes
1st place, gold medalist(s)	Micheline Ostermeyer	France	41.92	
2nd place, silver medalist(s)	Edera Gentile	Italy	41.17	
3rd place, bronze medalist(s)	Jacqueline Mazéas	France	40.47	
4	Jadwiga Wajs-Marcinkiewicz	Poland	39.30	
5	Lotte Haidegger	Austria	38.81	
6	Ans Panhorst-Niesink	Netherlands	38.74	
7	Majken Åberg	Sweden	38.48	
8	Ingeborg Mello	Argentina	38.44	
9	Frieda Tiltsch	Austria	37.19	
10	Paulette Veste	France	36.84	
11	Frances Kaszubski	United States	36.50	
12	Gudrun Arenander	Sweden	36.25	
13	Nel Roos-Lodder	Netherlands	36.15	
14	Bevis Reid	Great Britain	35.84	
15	Marianne Schläger	Austria	34.79	
16	Dorothy Dodson	United States	34.69	
17	Gabre Gabric	Italy	34.17	
18	Pak Bong-sik	South Korea	33.80	
19	Margaret Birtwistle	Great Britain	33.02	
20	Elspeth Whyte	Great Britain	32.46	
21	Julija Matej	Yugoslavia	30.25	
