= Anna Andreyeva =

Soviet shot putter

Medal record

Women's athletics

Representing the Soviet Union

European Championships
Gold medal – first place	1950 Brussels	Shot put

Anna Semyonovna Andreyeva (Russian: Анна Семёновна Андреева; 23 June 1915 – 1997) was a Soviet track and field athlete who competed mainly in the shot put. She was the gold medallist at the 1950 European Athletics Championships and a four-time Soviet national champion. Her personal best of 15.02 m (49 ft 3 1/4 in) was a world record and was the first time a woman had thrown beyond fifteen metres.

== Career ==
Born and raised in Penza in the Russian SSR of the Soviet Union, she was among the first Soviet women to reach world level in the shot put. She ranked in the top ten globally in 1936 and 1937. Her first national title at the Soviet Athletics Championships came in 1938 and the following year she threw beyond thirteen metres for the first time, ranking in the world's top five with her mark of 13.16 m (43 ft 2 in). She was the national runner-up in both 1939 and 1940 and achieved a new highest ranking in the latter year with a throw of 13.02 m (42 ft 8 1/2 in). Andreyeva placed within the world's top five athletes for eleven years consecutively from the period of 1942 to 1953.

At the age of 33 she made a career breakthrough with her first throw over fourteen metres. She won her second Soviet title in 1948 with a mark of 14.44 m (47 ft 4 1/2 in), which was better than the Olympic-winning throw of Micheline Ostermeyer that year. Onlyher compatriot Tatyana Sevryukova was better that year and she had broken the women's shot put world record.

Andreyeva improved to 14.51 m (47 ft 7 1/4 in) to win the Soviet title in 1949, but again was ranked second globally behind another Soviet world record breaker, this time Klavdia Tochonova. The 1950 season proved to be the career-defining one for the 35-year-old Andreyeva. First, she won her fourth and final national title in the shot put. She won her first and only major international gold medal at the 1950 European Athletics Championships, beating Tochonova to the title with a championship record mark of 14.32 m (46 ft 11 3/4 in). That November it was her turn to improve the world record, and her throw of 15.02 m (49 ft 3 1/4 in) in Ploiești, Romania, marked the first time that a woman had thrown beyond fourteen metres. This record lasted until July 1952, when the emergence of Galina Zybina saw the record brought near seventeen metres by the end of the decade. Andreyeva helped establish a pattern of dominance by Soviet women in the shot put, with Tamara Press in the 1960s, Nadezhda Chizhova in the 1970s and Natalya Lisovskaya in the 1980s retaining the record for the Soviets.

Although she did not win any further international titles, she was the world's number one ranked athlete in 1951. She continued to throw at a high level, but the rise of throwers such as Zabina, Tochenova, Sevryukova and Tamara Tyshkevich left her further down the national rankings (though still fifth globally in the 1952 Olympic year). Entering her forties, she was still highly ranked and her mark of 14.87 m (48 ft 9 1/4 in) in 1956 was a masters world record for women over forty. She was finally beaten by Antonia Ivanova in 1973. She did not compete at a global level after 1957.

During her career she lived in Moscow and trained with the "Vodnik" sports society before switching to Dynamo Sports Club in 1942. She was trained by Dmitry Petrovich Markov, himself a former Soviet shot put champion. She died in 1997.

== National titles ==
- Soviet Athletics Championships
  - Shot put: 1938, 1948, 1949, 1950

== International competitions ==
Year	Competition	Venue	Position	Event	Notes
1950	European Championships	Brussels, Belgium	1st	Shot put	14.32 m
1950	European Championships	Brussels, Belgium	10th	Discus throw	36.26 m

== See also ==
- List of European Athletics Championships medalists (women)

Records
Preceded by Klavdia Tochonova	Women's shot put world record holder 9 November 1950 – 26 July 1952	Succeeded by Galina Zybina
