= 1954 European Athletics Championships – Women's shot put =

Women's shot put at the European Athletics Championships

The women's shot put at the 1954 European Athletics Championships was held in Bern, Switzerland, at Stadion Neufeld on 26 August 1954.

== Medalists ==
Gold	Galina Zybina; Soviet Union
Silver	Mariya Kuznetsova; Soviet Union
Bronze	Tamara Tyshkevich; Soviet Union

== Results ==
=== Final ===
26 August

Rank	Name	Nationality	Result	Notes
1st place, gold medalist(s)	Galina Zybina	Soviet Union	15.65	CR
2nd place, silver medalist(s)	Mariya Kuznetsova	Soviet Union	14.99	
3rd place, bronze medalist(s)	Tamara Tyshkevich	Soviet Union	14.78	
4	Adéla Tislerová	Czechoslovakia	14.02	
5	Marianne Werner	West Germany	13.93	
6	Marija Radosavljević	Yugoslavia	13.71	
7	Marlene Biedermann	West Germany	12.96	
8	Mária Fehér	Hungary	12.93	
9	Anni Pöll	Austria	12.89	
10	Melania Velicu	Romania	12.73	
11	Regina Branner	Austria	12.67	
12	Jaroslava Křítková	Czechoslovakia	12.53	
13	Herlinde Peyker	Austria	12.30	
14	Rosmarie Bosshard	Switzerland	11.86	
15	Simone Saenen	Belgium	11.64	
16	Nicole Oosterlynck	Belgium	11.04	

== Participation ==
According to an unofficial count, 16 athletes from 9 countries participated in the event.

- Austria (3)
- Belgium (2)
- Czechoslovakia (2)
- Hungary (1)
- Romania (1)
- Soviet Union (3)
- Switzerland (1)
- West Germany (2)
- Yugoslavia (1)
