= Athletics at the 1960 Summer Olympics – Women's shot put =

Women's shot put at the Games of the XVII Olympiad
- Venue: Olympic Stadium
- Dates: 2 September 1960
- Competitors: 18 from 12 nations
- Winning distance: 17.32 OR

Medalists
1st place, gold medalist(s)		Tamara Press; Soviet Union
2nd place, silver medalist(s)		Johanna Lüttge; United Team of Germany
3rd place, bronze medalist(s)		Earlene Brown; United States

The women's shot put throwing event at the 1960 Olympic Games took place on 2 September.

== Results ==
Top 12 throwers and ties plus all throwers reaching 14.50 metres advanced to the finals. All distances are listed in metres.

=== Qualifying ===
Rank	Name	Nationality	Mark	1	2	3
1	Earlene Brown	United States	16.15	16.15	pass	pass
2	Valerie Sloper	New Zealand	16.07	16.07	pass	pass
3	Tamara Press	Soviet Union	16.00	13.23	16.00	pass
4	Wilfriede Hoffmann	United Team of Germany	15.84	15.84	pass	pass
5	Renate Boy	United Team of Germany	15.78	15.78	pass	pass
6	Johanna Lüttge	United Team of Germany	15.51	15.51	pass	pass
7	Zinaida Doynikova	Soviet Union	15.10	15.10	pas	pass
8	Galina Zybina	Soviet Union	15.03	15.03	pass	pass
9	Jadwiga Klimaj	Poland	14.85	foul	foul	14.85
10	Milena Usenik	Yugoslavia	14.74	14.20	14.74	pass
11	Věra Černá	Czechoslovakia	14.51	14.51	pass	pass
12	Eugenia Rusin	Poland	14.50	14.28	14.50	pass
13	Lidiya Sharamovich	Bulgaria	14.09	14.06	14.09	foul
14	Tsvetanka Krasteva	Bulgaria	13.99	13.66	13.99	foul
15	Yasuko Matsuda	Japan	13.51	13.51	12.56	12.99
16	Suzanne Farmer	Great Britain	13.10	12.03	13.10	pass
17	Ayala Hetzroni	Israel	12.59	12.59	12.59	pass
18	Wu Jin-yun	Formosa	11.76	11.53	11.42	11.76
	Melania Marinescu	Romania	DNS			
	Judit Bognár	Hungary	DNS			

=== Final ===
Rank	Name	Nationality	Mark	1	2	3	4	5	6	Notes
1st place, gold medalist(s)	Tamara Press	Soviet Union	17.32	16.08	17.32 OR	16.40	16.19	16.20	16.14	OR
2nd place, silver medalist(s)	Johanna Lüttge	United Team of Germany	16.61	16.21	16.59 =OR	15.74	15.20	15.40	16.61	
3rd place, bronze medalist(s)	Earlene Brown	United States	16.42	15.73	16.34	16.07	15.80	15.95	16.42	
4	Valerie Sloper	New Zealand	16.39	16.11	16.26	15.72	16.39	16.21	16.07	
5	Zinaida Doynikova	Soviet Union	16.13	foul	15.72	15.40	15.65	16.13	15.52	
6	Renate Boy	United Team of Germany	15.94	15.61	15.94	15.40	15.07	15.20	15.60	
7	Galina Zybina	Soviet Union	15.56	13.82	15.56	15.27				
8	Wilfriede Hoffmann	United Team of Germany	15.14	14.87	14.75	15.14				
9	Věra Černá	Czechoslovakia	15.06	15.06	14.29	foul				
10	Jadwiga Klimaj	Poland	14.66	14.06	14.66	13.78				
11	Eugenia Rusin	Poland	14.55	foul	14.55	14.18				
12	Milena Usenik	Yugoslavia	14.19	14.19	14.12	14.11				

Key: OR = Olympic record
