= Athletics at the 1956 Summer Olympics – Women's shot put =

Women's shot put at the Games of the XVI Olympiad
- Venue: Melbourne Cricket Ground
- Date: November 30, 1956
- Competitors: 18 from 9 nations
- Winning distance: 16.59 OR

Medalists
1st place, gold medalist(s)		Tamara Tyshkevich; Soviet Union
2nd place, silver medalist(s)		Galina Zybina; Soviet Union
3rd place, bronze medalist(s)		Marianne Werner; United Team of Germany

Video on YouTube Official Video @1:03:30

The women's shot put was an event at the 1956 Summer Olympics in Melbourne, Australia. The event was also known at the time as putting the weight.Abrahams, Harold (1956). The Olympic Games Book. p. 144. The qualification round mark was set on 13.00 metres. Three athletes didn't pass that distance in the heats.

== Summary ==
Galina Zybina left the previous Olympics with the world record at 15.28 m (50 ft 1 1/2 in). Since then she had improved upon her own record seven times, the last was just over a month earlier taking it to 16.76 m (54 ft 11 3/4 in). Her still standing Olympic record survived the qualifying round, the farthest throw only 14.43m. In the first round, returning silver medalist Marianne Werner set the new record with 15.61m. That only stood until Zybina threw 16.35m, to add a meter to the old record and surpass Werner by over two feet. Later Tamara Tyshkevich threw 16.13m to take over silver position. Zybina threw 16.32m on her second attempt, which was matched by Tyshkevich on her third, putting her only 3 cm behind. Zybina's fifth throw went 16.48m, another Olympic record. On her final attempt, Tyshkevich threw it 16.59 m (54 ft 5 in), another Olympic record. Zybina answered with her best attempt of the day, but 16.53m would no longer qualify as the Olympic record and only got her a silver medal.

== Results ==
=== Qualification ===
Qualifying distance: 13.00 metres

Rank	Athlete	Nation	1	2	3	Distance	Notes
1	Tamara Tyshkevich	Soviet Union	14.43			14.43	Q
2	Marianne Werner	United Team of Germany	14.21			14.21	Q
3	Galina Zybina	Soviet Union	14.08			14.08	Q
4	Johanna Lüttge	United Team of Germany	14.00			14.00	Q
5	Milena Usenik	Yugoslavia	13.96			13.96	Q
6	Nada Kotlušek	Yugoslavia	13.92			13.92	Q
7	Regina Branner	Austria	13.87			13.87	Q
8	Lois Testa	United States	12.26	13.51		13.51	Q
9	Zinaida Doynikova	Soviet Union	13.48			13.48	Q
10	Valerie Lawrence	Australia	13.43			13.43	Q
11	Suzanne Allday	Great Britain	12.81	13.42		13.42	Q
12	Earlene Brown	United States	13.39			13.39	Q
13	Jackie MacDonald	Canada	13.11			13.11	Q
14	Valerie Sloper	New Zealand	13.03			13.03	Q
15	Anne-Chatrine Lafrenz	United Team of Germany	13.00			13.00	Q
16	Paula Deubel	United States	x	12.20	12.38	12.38	
17	Marg Woodlock	Australia	11.52	10.94	11.70	11.70	
18	Mary Breen	Australia	11.28	9.56	10.98	11.28	
	Jiřina Vobořilová	Czechoslovakia				DNS	

=== Final ===
Rank	Athlete	Nation	1	2	3	4	5	6	Distance	Notes
1st place, gold medalist(s)	Tamara Tyshkevich	Soviet Union	16.13	14.80	16.32	15.92	15.45	16.59	16.59	OR
2nd place, silver medalist(s)	Galina Zybina	Soviet Union	16.35	16.32	15.82	16.28	16.48	16.53	16.53	
3rd place, bronze medalist(s)	Marianne Werner	United Team of Germany	15.61	15.56	15.46	x	15.01	15.53	15.61	
4	Zinaida Doynikova	Soviet Union	x	15.54	15.32	15.23	15.27	15.52	15.54	
5	Valerie Sloper	New Zealand	15.16	14.57	15.34	13.68	14.42	14.95	15.34	
6	Earlene Brown	United States	14.41	14.75	14.56	14.50	14.89	15.12	15.12	
7	Regina Branner	Austria	14.04	14.60	x				14.60	
8	Nada Kotlušek	Yugoslavia	14.52	14.56	14.27				14.56	
9	Milena Usenik	Yugoslavia	12.97	14.35	14.49				14.49	
10	Jackie MacDonald	Canada	14.31	x	12.72				14.31	
11	Johanna Lüttge	United Team of Germany	13.57	13.47	13.88				13.88	
12	Anne-Chatrine Lafrenz	United Team of Germany	13.72	x	13.44				13.72	
13	Valerie Lawrence	Australia	10.86	12.39	13.12				13.12	
14	Lois Testa	United States	12.34	13.06	12.64				13.06	
15	Suzanne Allday	Great Britain	12.37	12.71	x				12.71	
