= Athletics at the 1956 Summer Olympics – Women's discus throw =

Women's discus throw at the Games of the XVI Olympiad
- Venue: Melbourne Cricket Ground
- Date: November 23, 1956
- Competitors: 22 from 12 nations
- Winning distance: 53.69 OR

Medalists
| 1st place, gold medalist(s) | | Olga Fikotová; Czechoslovakia |
| 2nd place, silver medalist(s) | | Irina Beglyakova; Soviet Union |
| 3rd place, bronze medalist(s) | | Nina Ponomaryova; Soviet Union |

Video on YouTube Official Video @1:02:14

The women's discus throw was an event at the 1956 Summer Olympics in Melbourne, Australia. The qualification round mark was set at 42.00 metres. Nine competitors failed to reach that distance.

== Summary ==
In the final, Irina Beglyakova broke Nina Ponomaryeva's 4 year old Olympic record with a 51.74m. American Earlene Brown was not far off the old record with 51.35m, the only one interrupting the top three Soviet throwers. In the second round, defending champion Ponomaryeva improved to 51.61m, better than her previous record, to take over silver position. In the third round, Olga Fikotová improved on the record with a 52.04m, but her lead and record were short lived as Beglyakova improved it again to 52.54m. In the fourth round, Fikotová improved to 52.28m, but still was in second place. In the fifth round, Ponomaryeva got off her best throw of 52.02m, but it only improved her hold on bronze. Then Fikotová threw the winner. 53.69 m (176 ft 1 in), over a meter past Beglyakova for another Olympic record. Beglyakova had no answer, settling for silver.

In a much publicized Olympic romance, Fikotová would marry American hammer throw champion, Hal Connolly. After moving to the United States, she was refused permission to continue to throw for Czechoslovakia by the country's communist authorities. As Olga Connolly, she would represent USA in the next four Olympics.

== Results ==
=== Qualification ===
Qualifying distance: 42.00 metres

| Rank | Athlete | Nation | 1 | 2 | 3 | Distance | Notes |
|---|---|---|---|---|---|---|---|
| 1 | Olga Fikotová | Czechoslovakia | 28.60 | 50.77 | | 50.77 | Q |
| 2 | Nina Romashkova-Ponomaryova | Soviet Union | 48.34 | | | 48.34 | Q |
| 3 | Irina Beglyakova | Soviet Union | 40.77 | 47.65 | | 47.65 | Q |
| 4 | Štěpánka Mertová | Czechoslovakia | 40.51 | 46.26 | | 46.26 | Q |
| 5 | Jiřina Vobořilová | Czechoslovakia | 44.42 | | | 44.42 | Q |
| 6 | Earlene Brown | United States | 43.90 | | | 43.90 | Q |
| 6 | Albina Yelkina | Soviet Union | 43.90 | | | 43.90 | Q |
| 8 | Lia Manoliu | Romania | 43.87 | | | 43.87 | Q |
| 9 | Isabel Avellán | Argentina | 40.91 | 43.66 | | 43.66 | Q |
| 10 | Marianne Werner | United Team of Germany | 40.78 | 43.41 | | 43.41 | Q |
| 11 | Paola Paternoster | Italy | 42.88 | | | 42.88 | Q |
| 12 | Nada Kotlušek | Yugoslavia | 40.73 | 42.45 | | 42.45 | Q |
| 13 | Lois Jackman | Australia | 39.25 | 41.68 | 42.21 | 42.21 | Q |
| 14 | Suzanne Allday | Great Britain | 39.39 | 38.89 | 41.45 | 41.45 | |
| 15 | Anne-Chatrine Lafrenz | United Team of Germany | 33.72 | 41.18 | 41.16 | 41.18 | |
| 16 | Toyoko Yoshino | Japan | 40.77 | 36.47 | 40.91 | 40.91 | |
| 17 | Shirley Cotton | Australia | 37.74 | 40.76 | 39.36 | 40.76 | |
| 18 | Pam Kurrell | United States | 38.01 | 40.49 | 39.92 | 40.49 | |
| 19 | Jackie MacDonald | Canada | 33.77 | 33.93 | 40.41 | 40.41 | |
| 20 | Marjorie Larney | United States | 39.91 | 38.04 | x | 39.91 | |
| 21 | Valerie Lawrence | Australia | 33.84 | 35.76 | 36.61 | 36.61 | |
| 22 | Almut Brömmel | United Team of Germany | x | x | 35.47 | 35.47 | |

=== Final ===
| Rank | Athlete | Nation | 1 | 2 | 3 | 4 | 5 | 6 | Distance | Notes |
|---|---|---|---|---|---|---|---|---|---|---|
| 1st place, gold medalist(s) | Olga Fikotová | Czechoslovakia | 46.56 | 50.09 | 52.04 | 52.28 | 53.69 | 49.98 | 53.69 | OR |
| 2nd place, silver medalist(s) | Irina Beglyakova | Soviet Union | 51.74 | 51.01 | 52.54 | 50.32 | 48.22 | 48.31 | 52.54 | |
| 3rd place, bronze medalist(s) | Nina Romashkova-Ponomaryova | Soviet Union | 51.03 | 51.61 | 50.17 | 47.22 | 52.02 | 51.10 | 52.02 | |
| 4 | Earlene Brown | United States | 51.35 | 42.55 | x | x | 40.45 | 44.79 | 51.35 | |
| 5 | Albina Yelkina | Soviet Union | 47.87 | x | 48.20 | 45.18 | 45.45 | 47.92 | 48.20 | |
| 6 | Isabel Avellán | Argentina | 46.73 | 44.84 | 42.69 | 46.31 | 43.88 | 44.35 | 46.73 | |
| 7 | Jiřina Vobořilová | Czechoslovakia | 45.57 | x | 45.84 | | | | 45.84 | |
| 8 | Štěpánka Mertová | Czechoslovakia | 41.96 | 45.78 | 43.41 | | | | 45.78 | |
| 9 | Lia Manoliu | Romania | 43.90 | 43.76 | 42.72 | | | | 43.90 | |
| 10 | Marianne Werner | United Team of Germany | 43.34 | 41.89 | x | | | | 43.34 | |
| 11 | Paola Paternoster | Italy | 42.83 | 40.89 | x | | | | 42.83 | |
| 12 | Nada Kotlušek | Yugoslavia | 41.79 | 39.89 | 42.16 | | | | 42.16 | |
| 13 | Lois Jackman | Australia | 40.84 | 40.28 | 40.64 | | | | 40.84 | |
