= 1950 European Athletics Championships – Women's discus throw =

Women's discus throw at the European Athletics Championships

The women's discus throw at the 1950 European Athletics Championships was held in Brussels, Belgium, at Heysel Stadium on 25 August 1950.

== Medalists ==
Gold	Nina Dumbadze; Soviet Union
Silver	Rimma Shumskaya; Soviet Union
Bronze	Edera Cordiale; Italy

== Results ==
=== Final ===
25 August

Rank	Name	Nationality	Result	Notes
1st place, gold medalist(s)	Nina Dumbadze	Soviet Union	48.03	CR
2nd place, silver medalist(s)	Rimma Shumskaya	Soviet Union	42.25	
3rd place, bronze medalist(s)	Edera Cordiale	Italy	41.57	
4	Micheline Ostermeyer	France	41.22	
5	Julija Matej	Yugoslavia	40.58	
6	Paulette Veste	France	37.86	
7	Gabre Gabric-Calvesi	Italy	37.73	
8	Lotte Haidegger	Austria	37.40	
9	Đurđa Borovec	Yugoslavia	37.07	
10	Anna Andreyeva	Soviet Union	36.26	
11	Grete Bolliger	Switzerland	31.46	
12	Jaroslava Jungrová	Czechoslovakia	27.17	

== Participation ==
According to an unofficial count, 12 athletes from 7 countries participated in the event.

- Austria (1)
- Czechoslovakia (1)
- France (2)
- Italy (2)
- Soviet Union (3)
- Switzerland (1)
- Yugoslavia (2)
