= 1946 European Athletics Championships – Women's discus throw =

Women's discus throw at the European Athletics Championships

The women's discus throw at the 1946 European Athletics Championships was held in Oslo, Norway, at Bislett Stadion on 23 August 1946.

== Medalists ==
Gold	Nina Dumbadze; Soviet Union
Silver	Ans Niesink; Netherlands
Bronze	Jadwiga Wajs; Poland

== Results ==
=== Final ===
23 August

Rank	Name	Nationality	Result	Notes
1st place, gold medalist(s)	Nina Dumbadze	Soviet Union	44.52	
2nd place, silver medalist(s)	Ans Niesink	Netherlands	40.46	
3rd place, bronze medalist(s)	Jadwiga Wajs	Poland	39.37	
4	Gudrun Eklund	Sweden	36.90	
5	Irena Dobrzańska	Poland	36.30	
6	Tatyana Sevryukova	Soviet Union	34.05	
7	Helena Stachowicz	Poland	31.81	
8	Kathleen Dyer-Tilley	Great Britain	31.34	

=== Qualification ===
23 August

Rank	Name	Nationality	Result	Notes
1	Nina Dumbadze	Soviet Union	44.80	CR, Q
2	Jadwiga Wajs	Poland	39.96	Q
3	Tatyana Sevryukova	Soviet Union	38.55	Q
4	Ans Niesink	Netherlands	37.48	Q
5	Gudrun Eklund	Sweden	36.55	Q
6	Helena Stachowicz	Poland	32.92	Q
7	Irena Dobrzańska	Poland	31.37	Q
8	Kathleen Dyer-Tilley	Great Britain	28.60	Q
	Edera Cordiale	Italy	NM	

== Participation ==
According to an unofficial count, 9 athletes from 6 countries participated in the event.

- Italy (1)
- Netherlands (1)
- Poland (3)
- Soviet Union (2)
- Sweden (1)
- Great Britain (1)
