= Olga Fikotová =

Czechoslovak and American discus thrower (1932–2024)

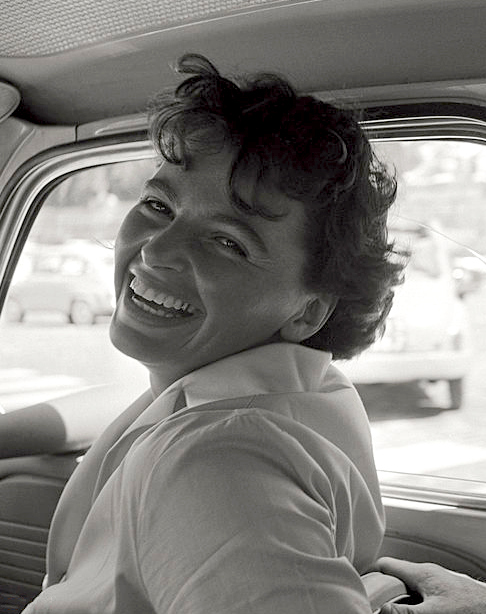
- Fikotová in 1960

Personal information
- Full name: Olga Connolly
- Born: Olga Fikotová; 13 November 1932 Most, Czechoslovakia
- Died: 12 April 2024 (aged 91) Costa Mesa, California, U.S.
- Height: 1.80 m (5 ft 11 in)
- Weight: 80 kg (180 lb)
- Spouse: Harold Connolly (divorced)

Sport
- Sport: Athletics
- Event: Discus throw
- Club: RH Praha (CZE); Spartan Women's Athletic Club (USA); Los Angeles Mercurettes (USA)

Achievements and titles
- Personal best: 57.61 m (1972)
Medal record
Representing Czechoslovakia
Athletics
Summer Olympics
Gold medal – first place	1956 Melbourne	Discus throw
Basketball
EuroBasket
Silver medal – second place	1954 Belgrade	Team

Olga Connolly (née Fikotová; Czech pronunciation: [ˈolɡa ˈfɪkotovaː], 13 November 1932 – 12 April 2024) was a Czechoslovak, and later American, discus thrower. She is best known for winning gold at the 1956 Melbourne Olympics, and for her romance across Cold War barriers with American hammer gold medalist Hal Connolly.

== Biography ==
A natural athlete, she represented Czechoslovakia in basketball and handball before switching to discus throw in 1954. Two years later, she was still a medical student at the Charles University in Prague when she competed for Czechoslovakia in the 1956 Summer Olympics held in Melbourne, Australia in the discus. The 24-year-old became Czechoslovakia's only gold medalist at the 1956 Olympics when she won with a throw of 53.69 m, beating Soviet pair Irina Beglyakova (52.54 m) and Nina Ponomaryova (52.02 m).

During the games she fell in love with the American athlete Harold Connolly, who won the hammer throw.

Several months later, Connolly visited her home in Prague, where they planned to get married. Fikotová was surprisingly given a permit to marry a foreigner, possibly due to the positive involvement of Czechoslovak president Antonín Zápotocký, who met the couple a few days before the wedding.

Their witnesses for the wedding were Olympic athletics gold medalists Emil Zátopek and Dana Zátopková. They had planned for a tiny mid-week wedding, but news got out, and it was attended by thousands of people.

The couple moved to the United States after the wedding.

The couple appeared on 10 June 1958 episode the game show To Tell the Truth, in which each one was shown alongside two impostors, and a panel attempted to guess who the real one was.

After moving to the U.S., Fikotová wanted to continue representing Czechoslovakia, but the Czechoslovak Olympic Committee refused to allow her to do. The committee spread the word that she had refused to represent Czechoslovakia, and she was ostracized by several of her former compatriots for years before the truth became known. Thereafter, as Olga Connolly, she represented the United States at every summer Olympics from 1960 until 1972, placing 7th in 1960 and 6th in 1968. She carried the flag for the United States at the 1972 Summer Olympics.

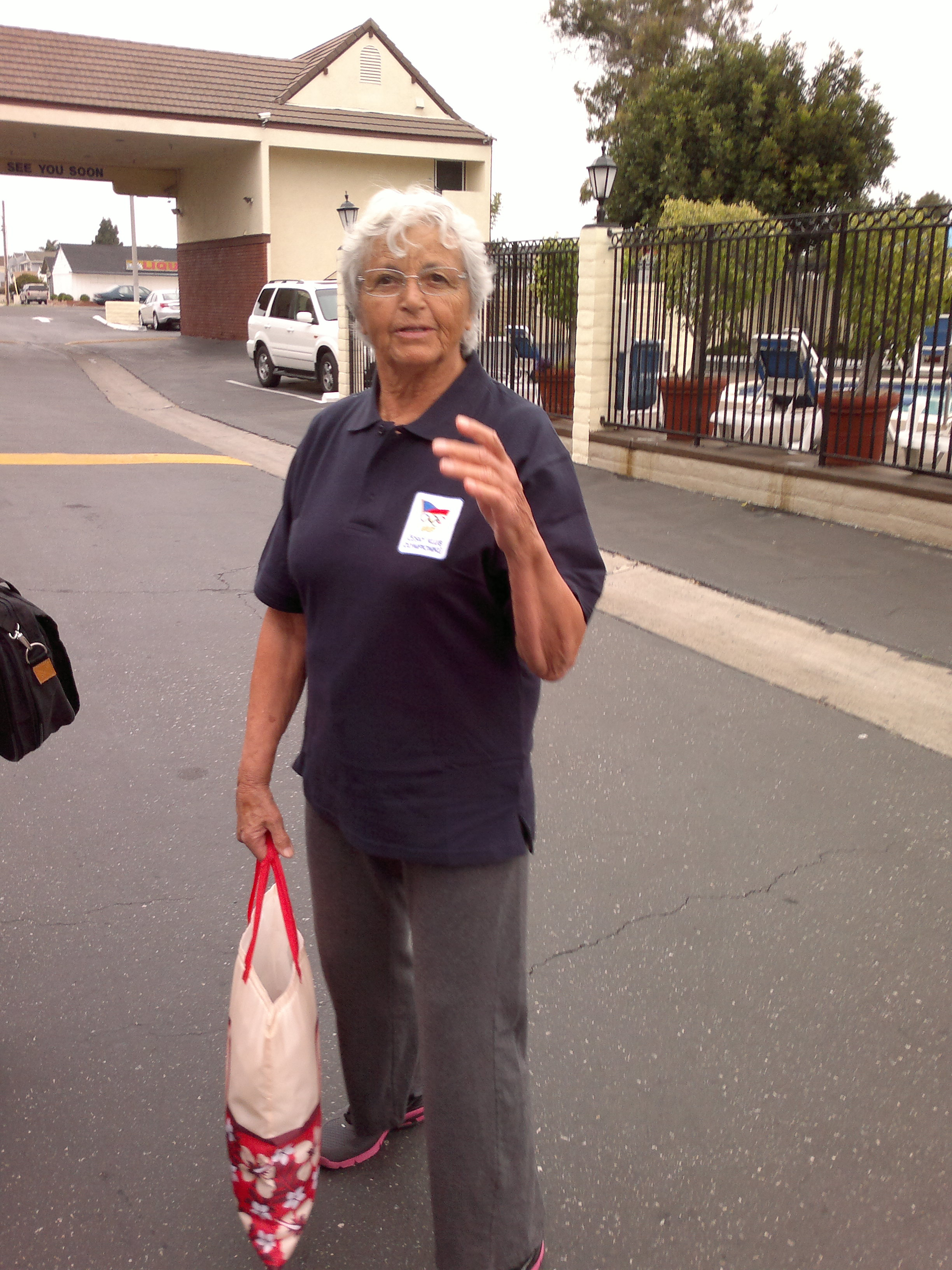
Olga Fikotová in 2012

In 1968, Fikotová published a book about her romance with Connolly, The Rings of Destiny. They remained married for 17 years before getting divorced in 1975. One of their sons became a national-caliber javelin thrower and decathlete, and one of their daughters played on the U.S. national volleyball team.

Fikotová later became a certified exercise therapist specializing in holistic fitness studies and training. She instructed a wellness program at the University of California, Irvine until 2017, then relocated to Nevada where she coached fitness and wellness at the EoS Fitness Club in Las Vegas.

Fikotová died from cancer in Costa Mesa, California on 12 April 2024, at the age of 91.
