= 1958 European Athletics Championships – Women's shot put =

Women's shot put at the European Athletics Championships

The women's shot put at the 1958 European Athletics Championships was held in Stockholm, Sweden, at Stockholms Olympiastadion on 23 August 1958.

== Medalists ==
Gold	Marianne Werner; West Germany
Silver	Tamara Tyshkevich; Soviet Union
Bronze	Tamara Press; Soviet Union

== Results ==
=== Final ===
23 August

Rank	Name	Nationality	Result	Notes
1st place, gold medalist(s)	Marianne Werner	West Germany	15.74	CR
2nd place, silver medalist(s)	Tamara Tyshkevich	Soviet Union	15.54	
3rd place, bronze medalist(s)	Tamara Press	Soviet Union	15.53	
4	Johanna Lüttge	East Germany	15.19	
5	Suzanne Allday	Great Britain	14.66	
6	Ana Roth	Romania	14.55	
7	Lore Klute	West Germany	14.48	
8	Milena Usenik	Yugoslavia	14.20	
9	Karin-Inge Halkier	Denmark	12.91	
10	Simone Saenen	Belgium	12.05	
11	Anni Pöll	Austria	11.74	
12	Fry Frischknecht	Switzerland	11.50	

== Participation ==
According to an unofficial count, 12 athletes from 10 countries participated in the event.

- Austria (1)
- Belgium (1)
- Denmark (1)
- East Germany (1)
- Romania (1)
- Soviet Union (2)
- Switzerland (1)
- Great Britain (1)
- West Germany (2)
- Yugoslavia (1)
