= Masters W65 shot put world record progression =

Masters W65 shot put world record progression is the progression of world record improvements of the shot put W65 division of Masters athletics. Records must be set in properly conducted, official competitions under the standing IAAF rules unless modified by World Masters Athletics. The W65 division consists of female athletes who have reached the age of 65 but have not yet reached the age of 70, so exactly from their 65th birthday to the day before their 70th birthday. The W65 division throws a 3 kg implement.

Key

Incomplete information Pending Indoor mark before 2000, not acceptable for record

Distance	Athlete	Nationality	Birthdate	Location	Date
12.21	Sigrun Kofink	Germany	23.04.1935	Kevelaer	19.08.2000
11.23	Galina Zybina	Russia	22.01.1931	Moscow	05.04.1996
10.77	Helen Stephens	United States	03.02.1918		01.06.1983
