= Nina Dumbadze =

Soviet discus thrower

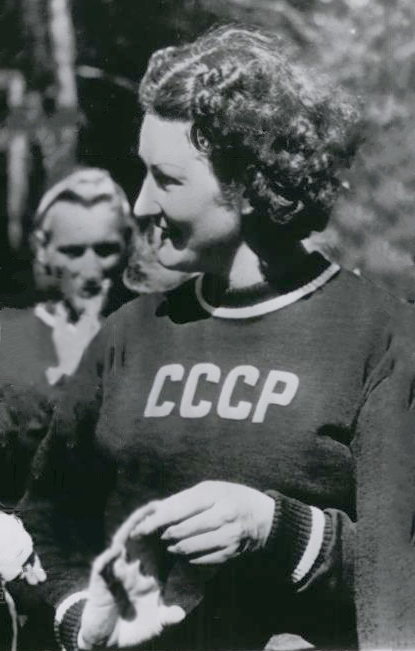
- Dumbadze in 1952

Personal information
- Born: 23 May 1919 (Note: Some sources give her date of birth as 23 January 1919.) Odessa
- Died: 14 April 1983 (aged 63) Tbilisi, Georgian SSR, Soviet Union

Sport
- Sport: Athletics
- Events: Discus throw, shot put
- Club: Dynamo Tbilisi

Achievements and titles
- Personal bests: DT – 57.04 m (1952); SP – 12.76 m (1948)
Medal record
Women's athletics
Representing Soviet Union
Olympic Games
Bronze medal – third place	1952 Helsinki	Discus throw
European Championships
Gold medal – first place	1946 Oslo	Discus throw
Gold medal – first place	1950 Brussels	Discus throw

Nina Yakovlevna Dumbadze (Georgian: ნინო დუმბაძე; 23 May 1919 – 14 April 1983) was a discus thrower who represented the Soviet Union. She won the European title in 1946 and 1950, and a bronze medal at the 1952 Olympics.

Dumbadze was born in Odessa to a Georgian father. She later moved to Tbilisi, Georgia, where she started training in athletics in 1937. Two years later at the Soviet championships she threw 49.11 m and broke the Gisela Mauermayer's world record of 48.31 m. Dumbadze kept breaking world records during World War II, and a week after the 1946 European Championships threw 50.50 m in Sarpsborg, Norway. In August 1948, she threw 53.25 m in Moscow. She set two more ratified world records: in May 1951 in Gori (53.37 m), and in October 1952 in Tbilisi (57.04 m). By that time she had a strong competition from teammates Nina Romashkova and Yelizaveta Bagryantseva, and hence placed third at the 1952 Olympics. Earlier she won eight Soviet titles, in 1939, 1943–44 and 1946–50.

After retiring from competitions Dumbadze worked as an athletics coach together with her husband Boris Dyachkov, who trained the Georgian athletics team for almost five decades. Their son Yuri Dyachkov became an Olympic decathlete.

== Notes ==
Records
Preceded by Gisela Mauermayer; Nina Romashkova	Women's discus throw world record holder 8 August 1948 – 9 August 1952; 18 October 1952 – 12 September 1960	Succeeded by (Soviet Union) Nina Romashkova; Tamara Press
