= Edera Cordiale =

Italian discus thrower (1920–1993)

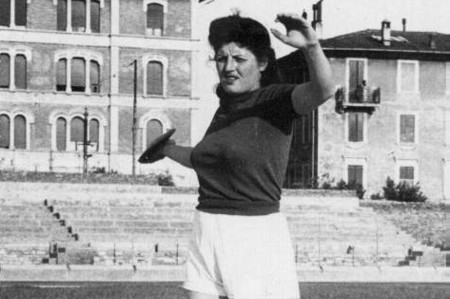
- Cordiale in the 1940s

Personal information
- Full name: Edera Cordiale-Gentile
- Nationality: Italian
- Born: 30 January 1920 Turin, Italy
- Died: 4 April 1993 (aged 73) Tortorici, Italy

Sport
- Country: Italy
- Sport: Athletics
- Event: Discus throw
- Club: Venchi Unica Torino

Achievements and titles
- Personal best: Discus throw: 46.19 m (1950)
Medal record
Women's athletics
Representing Italy
Summer Olympics
Silver medal – second place	1948 London	Discus throw
European Championships
Bronze medal – third place	1950 Brussels	Discus throw

Edera Cordiale, née Gentile, (30 January 1920 – 4 April 1993) was an Italian athlete who competed mainly in discus throw events.

== Biography ==
She competed for Italy in the 1948 Summer Olympics held in London, United Kingdom in the Discus where she won the Silver medal splitting the French athletes Micheline Ostermeyer and Jacqueline Mazéas. In 1950 in the European Championships she won the bronze medal.

== Achievements ==
Year	Competition	Venue	Position	Event	Performance	Notes
1948	Olympic Games	(United Kingdom) London	2nd	Discus throw	41.17 m	
1950	European Championships	(Belgium) Brussels	3rd	Discus throw	41.57 m	
1952	Olympic Games	(Finland) Helsinki	14th	Discus throw	38.22 m	

== National titles ==
She won the individual national championship on eight occasions.

- 8 wins in the discus throw (1943, 1946, 1947, 1948, 1949, 1950, 1951, 1952)
