= 1962 European Athletics Championships – Women's shot put =

Woman's Championship

Women's shot put at the European Athletics Championships

The women's shot put at the 1962 European Athletics Championships was held in Belgrade, then Yugoslavia, at JNA Stadium on 12 September 1962.

== Medalists ==
Gold	Tamara Press; Soviet Union
Silver	Renate Garisch; East Germany
Bronze	Galina Zybina; Soviet Union

== Results ==
=== Final ===
12 September

Rank	Name	Nationality	Result	Notes
1st place, gold medalist(s)	Tamara Press	Soviet Union	18.55	WR
2nd place, silver medalist(s)	Renate Garisch	East Germany	17.17	
3rd place, bronze medalist(s)	Galina Zybina	Soviet Union	16.95	
4	Johanna Hübner	East Germany	15.97	
5	Wilfriede Hoffmann	East Germany	15.75	
6	Ana Sălăgean	Romania	15.26	
7	Ivanka Khristova	Bulgaria	15.16	
8	Judit Bognár	Hungary	14.44	
9	Maria Chorbova	Bulgaria	14.33	
10	Suzanne Allday	Great Britain	13.85	
11	Stefania Kiewłeń	Poland	13.76	
12	Mary Peters	Great Britain	13.15	

== Participation ==
According to an unofficial count, 12 athletes from 7 countries participated in the event.

- Bulgaria (2)
- East Germany (3)
- Hungary (1)
- Poland (1)
- Romania (1)
- Soviet Union (2)
- Great Britain (2)
