= Krysiński =

Krysiński is a Polish surname. The feminine form is Krysińska. Notable people with the surname include:

- Elżbieta Krysińska (1928–2018), Polish athlete
- Jan Eugeniusz Krysiński (1935–2025), Polish scientist, rector of Lodz University of Technology
- Marie Krysińska (1857–1908), Polish-French symbolist poet, novelist, and musician
