= Albina Yelkina =

Soviet athlete

Personal information
- Nationality: Soviet
- Born: 29 December 1932 Novokiyevka, Soviet Union
- Died: 20 March 2009 (aged 76) Zaporizhzhia, Ukraine

Sport
- Sport: Athletics
- Event: Discus throw

Albina Yelkina (Ukrainian: Альбіна Єлькіна; 29 December 1932 – 20 March 2009) was a Soviet athlete. She competed in the women's discus throw at the 1956 Summer Olympics.
