= Masters W70 shot put world record progression =

Masters W70 shot put world record progression is the progression of world record improvements of the shot put W70 division of Masters athletics. Records must be set in properly conducted, official competitions under the standing IAAF rules unless modified by World Masters Athletics. The W70 division consists of female athletes who have reached the age of 70 but have not yet reached the age of 75, so exactly from their 70th birthday to the day before their 75th birthday. The W70 division throws a 3 kg implement.

Key

Incomplete information Pending Indoor mark before 2000, not acceptable for record

Distance	Athlete	Nationality	Birthdate	Age	Location	Date	Ref
11.09 (Note: record not ratified for irregular platform)	Mihaela Loghin	Romania	1 June 1952	70 years, 29 days	Tampere	30 June 2022	
11.57 i (Note: probably 2 kg implement)	Anne Chatrine Rühlow	Germany	30 September 1936	74 years, 135 days	Erfurt	12 February 2011	
11.32 i (Note: probably 2 kg implement)	Carol Young	United States			Clemson	21 January 2012	
11.02	Rosemary Chrimes	Great Britain	19 May 1933	70 years, 19 days	Derby	7 June 2003	
9.63	Jutta Schäfer	Germany	17 October 1931	70 years, 248 days	Bad Nauheim	22 June 2002	
9.57	Marianne Hamm	Germany	2 October 1927	70 years, 303 days	Minden	1 August 1998	
