= Athletics at the 1961 Summer Universiade – Women's shot put =

The women's shot put event at the 1961 Summer Universiade was held at the Vasil Levski National Stadium in Sofia, Bulgaria, in September 1961.

== Results ==
Rank	Athlete	Nationality	Result	Notes
1st place, gold medalist(s)	Tamara Press	Soviet Union	17.12	
2nd place, silver medalist(s)	Irina Press	Soviet Union	15.61	
3rd place, bronze medalist(s)	Ana Roth	Romania	15.59	
4	Ivanka Khristova	Bulgaria	14.99	
5	Lidiya Sharamovich	Bulgaria	14.54	
6	Jolan Kontsek	Hungary	14.16	
7	Seiko Obonai	Japan	13.69	
8	Almut Brömmel	West Germany	12.16	
