= Tsvetanka Krasteva =

Bulgarian shot putter

Personal information
- Nationality: Bulgarian
- Born: 18 August 1935 (age 90)

Sport
- Sport: Athletics
- Event: Shot put

Tsvetanka Krasteva (born 18 August 1935) is a Bulgarian athlete. She competed in the women's shot put at the 1960 Summer Olympics.
