= Libuše Nováková =

Czech discus thrower (1924–2004)

Personal information
- Nationality: Czech
- Born: 29 March 1924 Česká Skalice, Czech Republic
- Died: 10 July 2004 (aged 80) Plzeň, Czech Republic

Sport
- Sport: Athletics
- Event: Discus throw

Libuše Nováková (29 March 1924 – 10 July 2004) was a Czech athlete. She competed in the women's discus throw at the 1952 Summer Olympics. Nováková died in Plzeň on 10 July 2004, at the age of 80.
