= Věra Černá (athlete) =

Czech shot putter

Personal information
- Nationality: Czech
- Born: 12 April 1938 Prague, Czechoslovakia
- Died: 5 November 2008 (aged 70) Banff, Alberta, Canada

Sport
- Sport: Athletics
- Event: Shot put

Věra Černá (12 April 1938 – 5 November 2008) was a Czech athlete. She competed in the women's shot put at the 1960 Summer Olympics.
