= Gertrud Kille =

German shot putter

Personal information
- Nationality: German
- Born: 17 January 1925
- Died: 6 August 1978 (aged 53)

Sport
- Sport: Athletics
- Event: Shot put

Gertrud Kille (17 January 1925 – 6 August 1978) was a German athlete. She competed in the women's shot put at the 1952 Summer Olympics.
