= Grete Heublein =

German athletics competitor

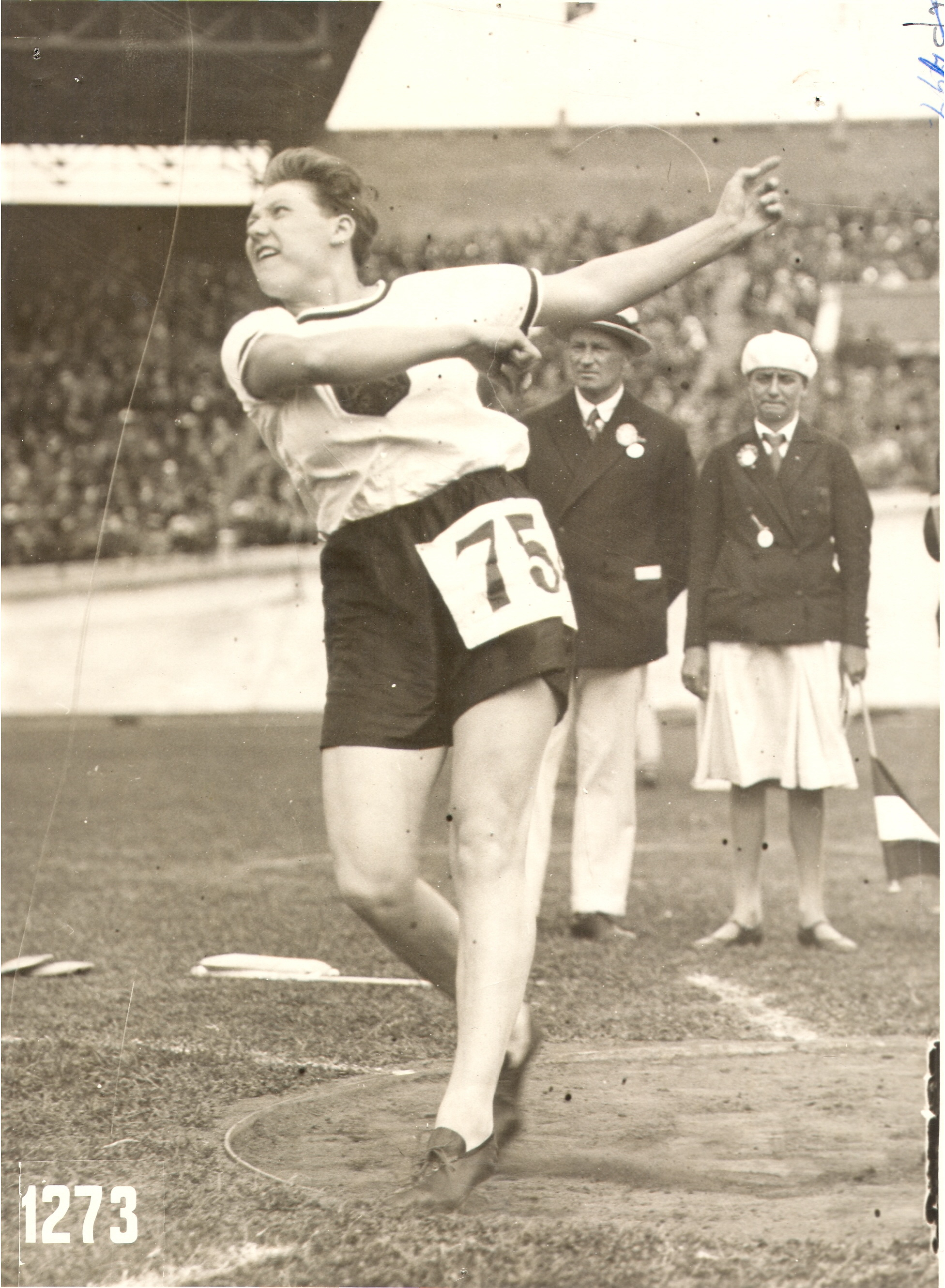

Medal record

Women's athletics

Representing Germany

Women's World Games
Gold medal – first place	1930 Prague	Shot put

Margarete "Grete" Heublein (29 January 1908, in Barmen – 2 March 1997, in Wuppertal) was a German track and field athlete who competed in the discus throw, shot put and the 100 metres sprint. She set the world record in discus on 19 June 1932 in Hagen, reaching 40.84 metres, but lost it the same day. She competed at the 1928 Summer Olympics and the 1932 Summer Olympics. She also won five silver medals and one bronze medal at the German Championships.

Records
Preceded by (Poland) Jadwiga Wajs	Women's Discus World Record Holder; 19 June 1932	Succeeded by (Poland) Jadwiga Wajs
