= Paulette Laurent =

French shot putter

Personal information
- Nationality: French
- Born: 8 March 1926 Schiltigheim, France
- Died: 10 December 2018 (aged 92) Annecy, France

Sport
- Sport: Athletics
- Event: Shot put

Paulette Laurent (8 March 1926 – 10 December 2018) was a French athlete. She competed in the women's shot put at the 1948 Summer Olympics, where she finished in 10th place.

Laurent was born at Schiltigheim and was a member of the RC Strasbourg athletics club. She became French national champion in the women's discus in 1953, with a throw of 37.51 metres, at the Stade Yves-du-Manoir, Colombes.
