= Jadwiga Wajs =

Polish discus thrower (1912–1990)

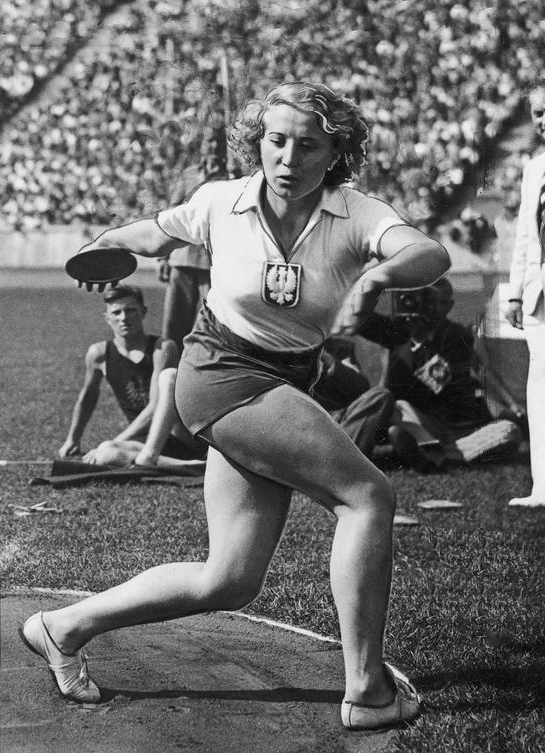
- Jadwiga Wajs in 1937

Personal information
- Full name: Jadwiga Wajs-Marcinkiewicz
- Nicknames: Puszkówna, Jadzia
- Born: 30 January 1912 Pabianice, Russian Empire
- Died: 1 February 1990 (aged 78) Pabianice, Poland
- Height: 1.66 m (5 ft 5 in)
- Weight: 72 kg (159 lb)

Sport
- Club: Sokół Pabianice (1926–1935); Sokół Poznań (1936); Boruta Zgierz (1937–1939); DKS Łódź (1945–1948); ŁKS Włókniarz Łódź (1949–1958)
Medal record
Women's athletics
Representing Poland
Olympic Games
| Silver medal – second place | 1936 Berlin | Discus throw |
| Bronze medal – third place | 1932 Los Angeles | Discus throw |
Women's World Games
| Gold medal – first place | 1934 London | Discus throw |
European Championships
| Bronze medal – third place | 1946 Oslo | Discus throw |

Jadwiga Wajs-Marcinkiewicz (30 January 1912 – 1 February 1990) was a Polish athlete who mainly competed in the discus throw.

== Career ==
Wajs competed for Poland at the 1932 Summer Olympics held in Los Angeles, US, in the women's discus throw event, winning the bronze medal.

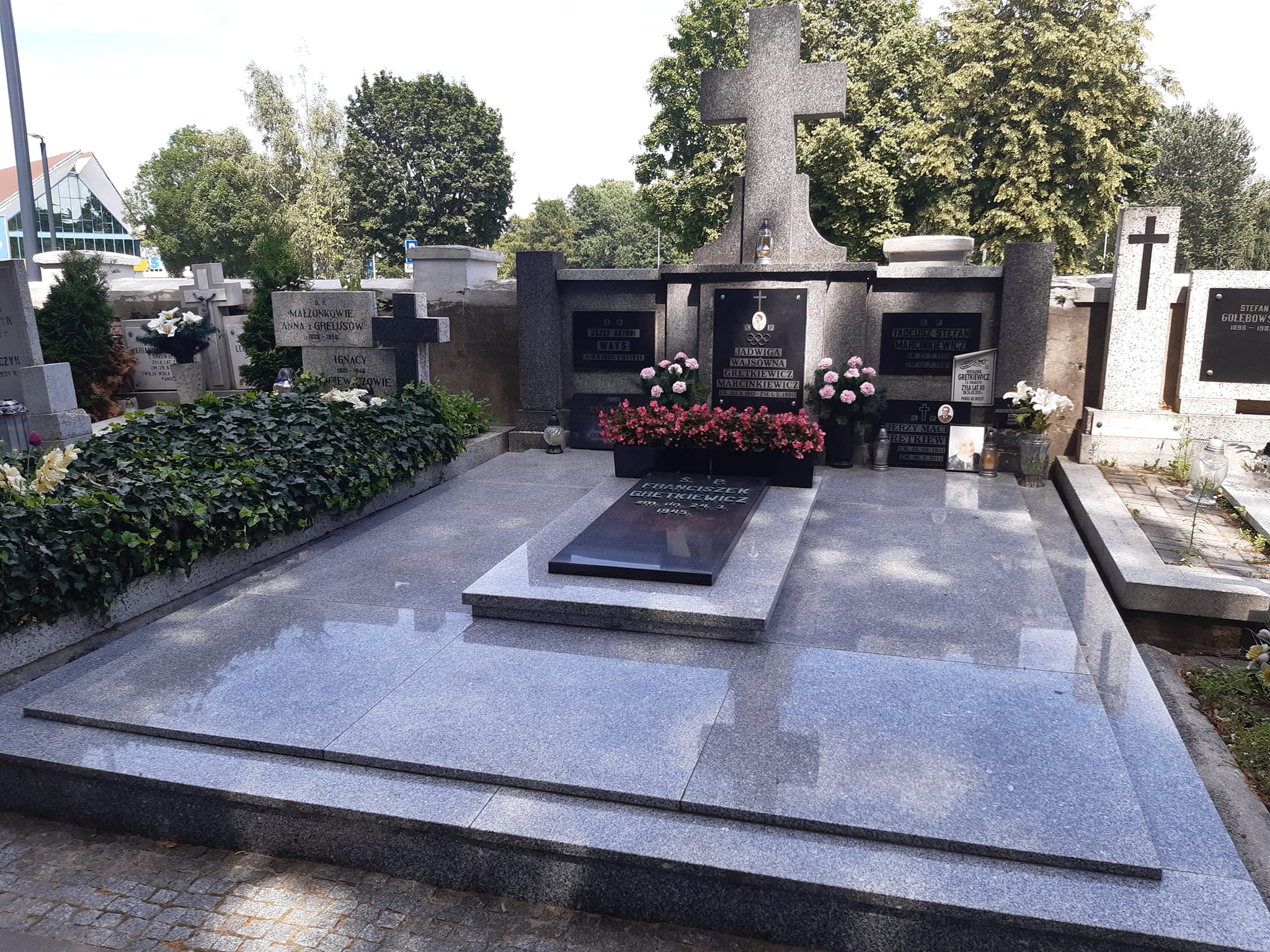
The grave of Jadwiga Wajs at the Old Cemetery in Pabianice

Four years later she threw the discus again for Poland in the 1936 Summer Olympics held in Berlin, Germany, where she split the German pair Gisela Mauermayer and Paula Mollenhauer in winning the silver medal. Wajs was Jewish, and her father's ancestors came to Livonia and Poland from Westfalen in the 13th century. Their heraldic crest was the white swan.

== International competitions ==
| Year | Competition | Venue | Position | Event | Notes |
Representing Poland
| 1932 | Olympic Games | Los Angeles, United States | 3rd | Discus throw | 38.74 m |
| 1934 | Women's World Games | London, United Kingdom | 1st | Discus throw | 43.795 m |
| 1936 | Olympic Games | Berlin, Germany | 2nd | Discus throw | 46.22 m |
| 1946 | European Championships | Oslo, Norway | 4th | Shot put | 11.65 m |
| 1946 | European Championships | Oslo, Norway | 3rd | Discus throw | 39.37 m |
| 1948 | Olympic Games | London, United Kingdom | 4th | Discus throw | 39.30 m |

== Personal bests ==
- 100 metres – 14.2h (Łódź 1931)
- 80 metres hurdles – 13.8h (Warsaw 1929)
- High jump – 1.48 metres (Bydgoszcz 1936)
- High jump – 1.515 metres i (Przemyśl 1936)
- Long jump – 4.65 metres (Bydgoszcz 1936)
- Standing long jump – 2.44 metres (Łódź 1936)
- Shot put – 12.24 metres (Poznań 1938)
- Discus throw – 46.22 metres (Berlin 1936)
- Javelin throw (old model) – 33.49 metres (Bydgoszcz 1936)

Records
| Preceded by (Poland) Halina Konopacka | Women's Discus World Record Holder; 15 May 1932 – 19 June 1932 | Succeeded by (Germany) Grete Heublein |
| Preceded by (Germany) Grete Heublein | Women's Discus World Record Holder; 19 June 1932 – 2 June 1935 | Succeeded by (Germany) Gisela Mauermayer |
