= Yasuko Matsuda =

Japanese shot putter (1937–2021)

Personal information
- Nationality: Japanese
- Born: 24 April 1937
- Died: 24 August 2021 (aged 84)

Sport
- Sport: Athletics
- Event: Shot put

Yasuko Matsuda (松田 靖子, Matsuda Yasuko; 24 April 1937 – 24 August 2021) was a Japanese athlete. She competed in the women's shot put at the 1960 Summer Olympics.
