= Kaarina Koivuniemi =

Finnish discus thrower (born 1932)

Personal information
- Nationality: Finnish
- Born: 13 April 1932 (age 94)

Sport
- Sport: Athletics
- Event: Discus throw

Kaarina Koivuniemi (born 13 April 1932) is a Finnish athlete. She competed in the women's discus throw at the 1952 Summer Olympics.
