= Magdalena Breguła =

Polish shot putter

Personal information
- Nationality: Polish
- Born: 17 May 1921 Siemianowice Śląskie, Poland
- Died: 4 June 1957 (aged 36) Katowice, Poland

Sport
- Sport: Athletics
- Event: Shot put
- Club: KS Strzelec Katowice (1938–1939); HKS Siemianowiczanka (1945–1947); Pogoń Katowice (1948–1949); Stal Katowice (1949–1954)

Magdalena Breguła (17 May 1921 – 4 June 1957) was a Polish athlete. She competed in the women's shot put at the 1952 Summer Olympics.

== International competitions ==
Year	Competition	Venue	Position	Event	Notes
Representing Poland
1950	European Championships	Brussels, Belgium	5th	Shot put	12.80 m
1952	Olympic Games	Helsinki, Finland	10th	Shot put	12.93 m

== Personal bests ==
- Shot put – 13.50 (Bucharest 1950)
- Discus throw – 35.70 (Ostrów 1952)
- Javelin throw – 35.48 (Warsaw 1951)
