= Eugenia Rusin =

Polish shot putter

Personal information
- Full name: Eugenia Maria Rusin
- Nationality: Polish
- Born: 20 March 1933 Gdynia, Poland
- Died: 15 October 1995 (aged 62) Sopot, Poland
- Height: 1.77 m (5 ft 10 in)
- Weight: 76 kg (168 lb)

Sport
- Sport: Athletics
- Event: Shot put
- Club: Gwardia Gdańsk (1953–1956); Wybrzeże Gdańsk (1957–1967)
- Coached by: Mieczysław Łomowski

Eugenia Maria Rusin (later Ciarkowska; 20 March 1933 – 15 October 1995) was a Polish athlete. She competed in the women's shot put at the 1960 Summer Olympics.

Her personal best in the event was 15.06 metres set in Poznań in 1960. This is the former national record.

== International competitions ==
Year	Competition	Venue	Position	Event	Notes
Representing Poland
1960	Olympic Games	Rome, Italy	11th	Shot put	14.55 m
1965	European Cup Final	Kassel, West Germany	5th	Shot put	14.42 m
1967	European Cup Final	Kiev, Soviet Union	6th	Shot put	14.09 m
