= Choi Myeong-suk =

South Korean athlete (born 1934)

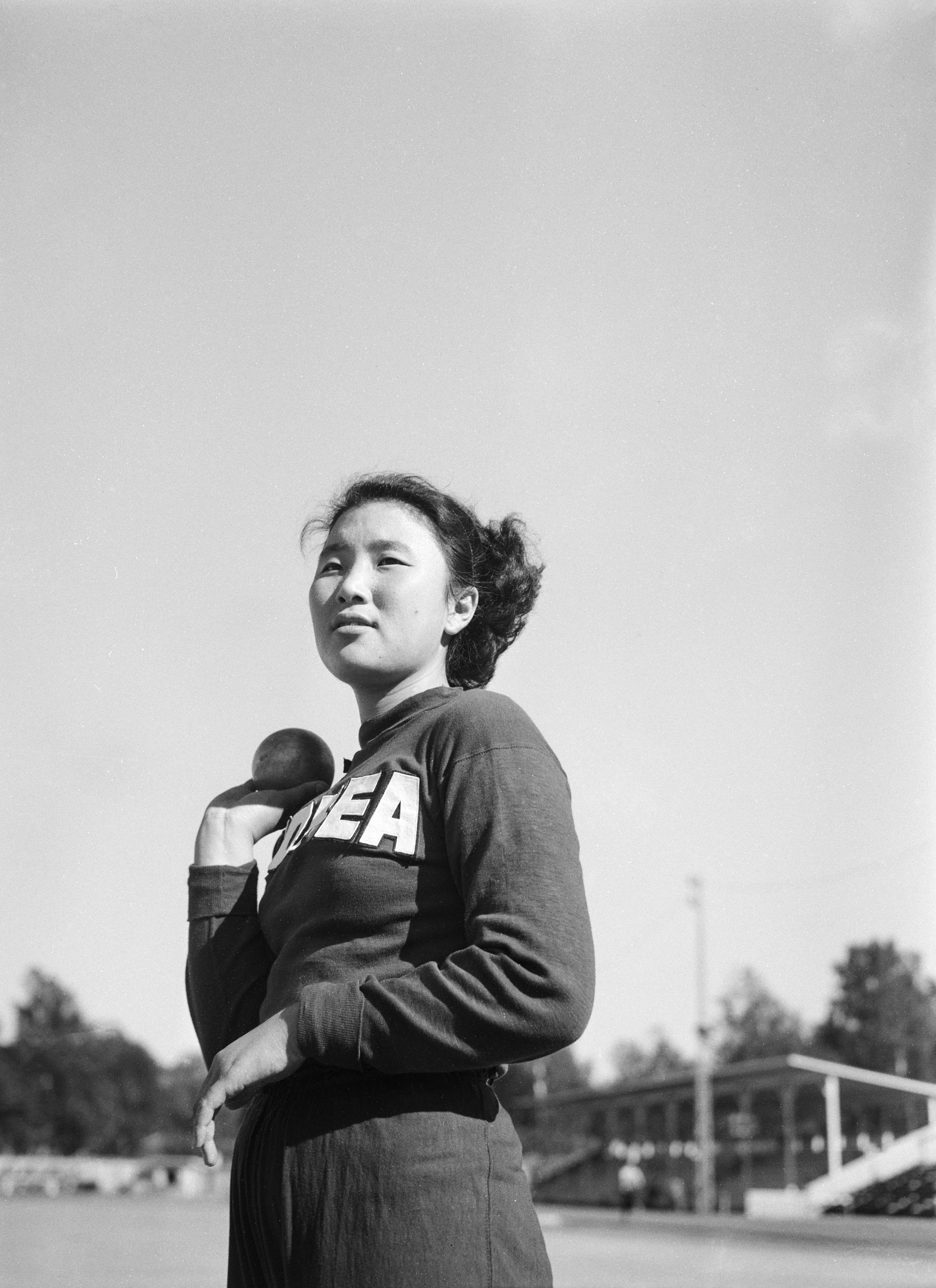

Personal information
- Nationality: South Korean
- Born: 19 February 1934 (age 92)

Sport
- Sport: Athletics
- Event: Shot put

Choi Myeong-suk (Korean: 최명숙, born 19 February 1934) is a South Korean athlete. She competed in the women's shot put at the 1952 Summer Olympics.
