= Marianne Schläger =

Austrian shot putter and discus thrower

Personal information
- Nationality: Austrian
- Born: 22 November 1920 Linz, Austria

Sport
- Sport: Athletics
- Events: Shot put Discus

Marianne Schläger (born 22 November 1920) was an Austrian athlete. She competed in the women's shot put and the women's discus throw at the 1948 Summer Olympics.
