= Shirley Cotton =

Australian discus thrower (1934–2022)

Personal information
- Nationality: Australian
- Born: 17 October 1934
- Died: 11 July 2022 (aged 87) Sydney, Australia

Sport
- Sport: Athletics
- Event: Discus throw

Shirley Cotton (17 October 1934 – 11 July 2022) was an Australian athlete. She competed in the women's discus throw at the 1956 Summer Olympics.
