= Pak Bong-sik =

South Korean discus thrower (1930–1951)

Personal information
- Nationality: South Korean
- Born: 1930
- Died: 1951 (aged 20–21)

Sport
- Sport: Athletics
- Event: Discus throw

Pak Bong-sik (1930–1951) was a South Korean athlete. She competed in the women's discus throw at the 1948 Summer Olympics. She was the first woman to represent South Korea at the Olympics.

== Career ==
Pak Bong-sik played various sports including basketball before focusing on athletics and discus throw. She studied in Korea and in China, where she was taught a physical education different from the education in her country. She beat the world record in a domestic contest in Korea in 1948 (not recognized by IAAF), she competed in the women's discus throw at the 1948 Summer Olympics, finishing 18th out of 22.

She was the first woman to represent South Korea at the Olympics; she said to Dong-a Ilbo on June 20, 1948 :

I feel a little sad because I'm the only woman. For the future, I request that more Korean women participate in such competitions.

She beat the national record in 1949 with a jump at 39.65 m. In June 1950, she suffers from an acute appendicitis but delays her operation in order to participate in the national championship where she makes a throw at 39.57 m. She died of meningitis in 1951, in the middle of the Korean War.
