= Dorothea Kreß =

German shot putter (1924–2018)

Personal information
- Nationality: German
- Born: 26 August 1924
- Died: 25 October 2018 (aged 94)

Sport
- Sport: Athletics
- Event: Shot put

Dorothea Kreß (26 August 1924 – 25 October 2018) was a German athlete. She competed in the women's shot put at the 1952 Summer Olympics.
