= Valerie Lawrence =

Australian shot putter

Personal information
- Nationality: Australian
- Born: 5 August 1936 (age 89)

Sport
- Sport: Athletics
- Events: Shot put Discus

Valerie Dawn Lawrence (born 5 August 1936) is an Australian athlete. She competed in the women's shot put and the women's discus throw at the 1956 Summer Olympics.
