= Ine Schäffer =

Austrian shot putter (1923–2009)

Personal information
- Full name: Inga Schäffer
- Born: 28 March 1923 Graz, Steiermark, Austria
- Died: 19 March 2009 (aged 85) Victoria, British Columbia, Canada
Medal record
Women's athletics
Representing Austria
Olympic Games
Bronze medal – third place	1948 London	Shot put

Inga Schäffer (née Mayer von Bojana; later Spreitz; 28 March 1923 – 19 March 2009) was an Austrian athlete who competed mainly in the shot put. She was an Austrian champion in shot put, javelin, and discus. Between 1943 and 1950, she beat Austrian track and field records five times. She represented Austria in the 1948 Summer Olympics held in London, United Kingdom in the shot put, where she won the bronze medal. Schäffer immigrated to Canada in 1952, and later taught physical education in British Columbia. She married former assistant coach Karl Spreitz in 1953. She died in Victoria, B.C. on 19 March 2009.
