= Jadwiga Klimaj =

Polish shot putter

Personal information
- Nationality: Polish
- Born: 6 October 1931 Kraków, Poland
- Died: 9 July 1998 (aged 66)
- Height: 1.72 m (5 ft 8 in)
- Weight: 80 kg (176 lb)

Sport
- Sport: Athletics
- Event: Shot put
- Club: HKS Kraków (1947–1948); Kolejarz Kraków (1949–1954); Wawel Kraków (1956–1961); Gwardia Warszawa (1962–1968)

Jadwiga Józefa Konik-Klimaj-Kowalczuk (6 October 1931 – 9 July 1998) was a Polish athlete. She competed in the women's shot put at the 1960 Summer Olympics.

== International competitions ==
Year	Competition	Venue	Position	Event	Notes
Representing Poland
1960	Olympic Games	Rome, Italy	10th	Shot put	14.66 m

== Personal bests ==
- Shot put – 15.44 (Bydgoszcz 1963) former NR
- Discus throw – 48.01 (Warsaw 1959)
- Javelin throw – 42.70 (Skarżysko 1959)
