= Ayala Hetzroni =

Israeli shot putter (born 1938)

Personal information
- Native name: אילה חצרוני
- Born: June 15, 1938 (age 88) Haifa, Israel
- Height: 5 ft 5 in (165 cm)
- Weight: 150 lb (68 kg)

Sport
- Country: Israel
- Sport: Shot Put

Achievements and titles
- National finals: Israeli Women's Champion (1960 & 1962)
- Personal best: 13.02 meters (1960)

Ayala Hetzroni (also "Hezroni"; Hebrew: אילה חצרוני; born June 15, 1938) is an Israeli former Olympic shotputter. She was Israeli Women's Champion in 1960 and 1962.

She was born in Haifa, Israel, and is Jewish.

== Shot put career ==
Hetzroni's personal best in the shot put is 13.02 metres, which she recorded in 1960, setting a new Israeli record three months before the Olympics. She was the Israeli Women's Champion in 1960 and 1962.

Hetzroni competed for Israel at the 1960 Summer Olympics in Rome, Italy, at the age of 22. In the Women's Shot Put she came in 17th with a best distance of 12.59 metres. When she competed in the Olympics she was 5 feet 5 inches (165 cm) tall and weighed 150 pounds (68 kg).

She won a gold medal in shotput at the 1961 Maccabiah Games.
