= Olga Winterberg =

Israeli discus thrower

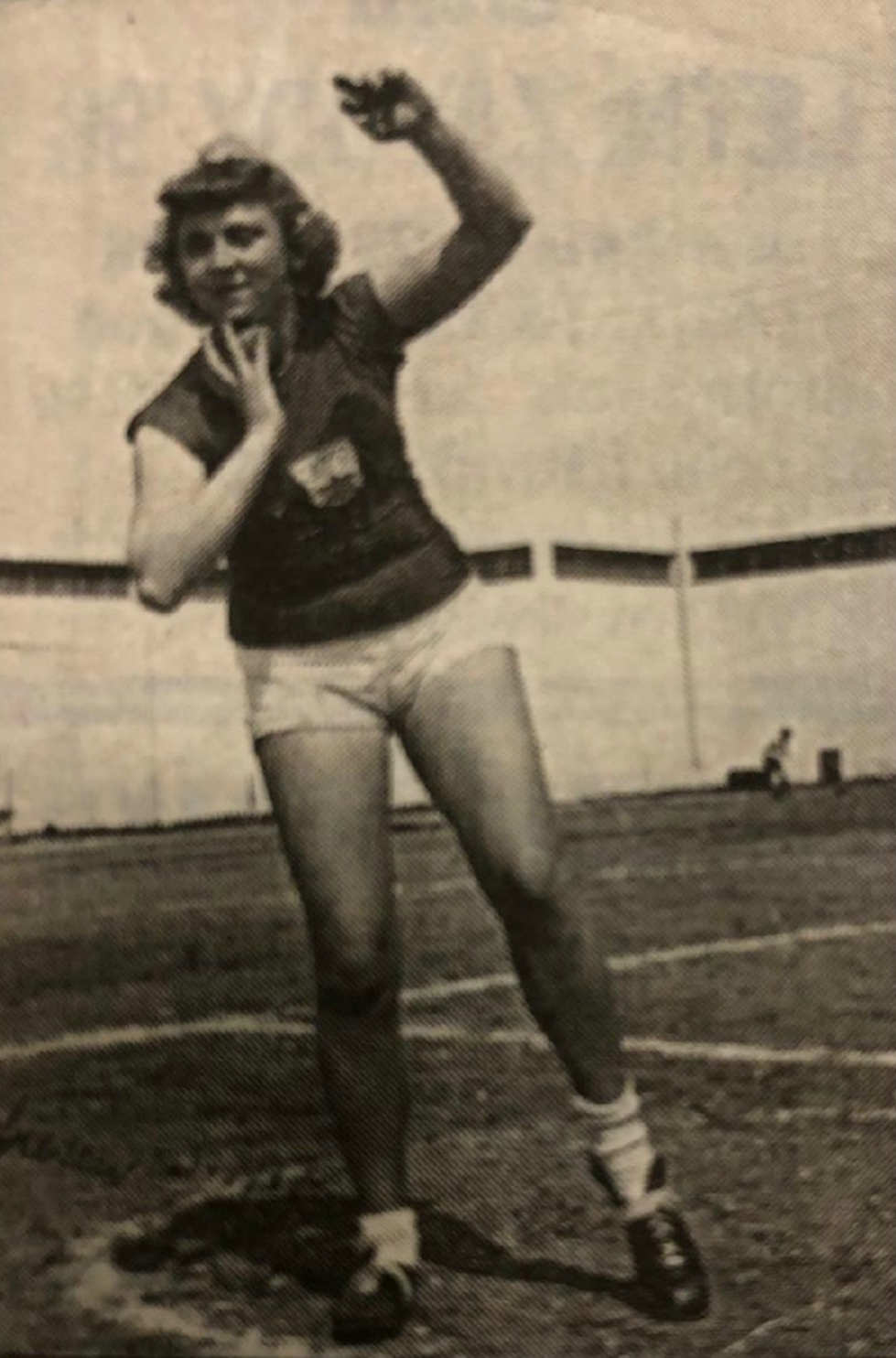

Personal information
- Native name: אולגה וינטנברג
- National team: Israel
- Born: May 3, 1922 Czechoslovakia
- Died: December 15, 2010 (aged 88)

Sport
- Country: Israel
- Sport: Discus

Achievements and titles
- Personal best: discus throw: 43.03 meters (1960)

Olga Winterberg (Hebrew: אולגה וינטנברג; May 3, 1922 – 2010) was an Israeli Olympian in the discus throw. She was the first woman to represent Israel at the Olympics. Winterberg was the Israel Women's Champion in the Discus Throw in 1960, and 1962-64.

She was born and raised in the Czechoslovakia, moved to Israel, and was Jewish.

== Discus throwing career ==
Winterberg competed for Israel at the 1952 Summer Olympics in Helsinki at the age of 30. In the Women's Discus Throw she came in 19th, with a throw of 35.79 metres. She missed moving up to the finals by less than .30 metres.

Her personal best in the discus throw was the then-national record of 43.03, in May 1960. Winterberg was the Israel Women's Champion in the Discus Throw in 1960, and 1962–64.
