= Nina Ponomaryova =

Soviet discus thrower (1929–2016)

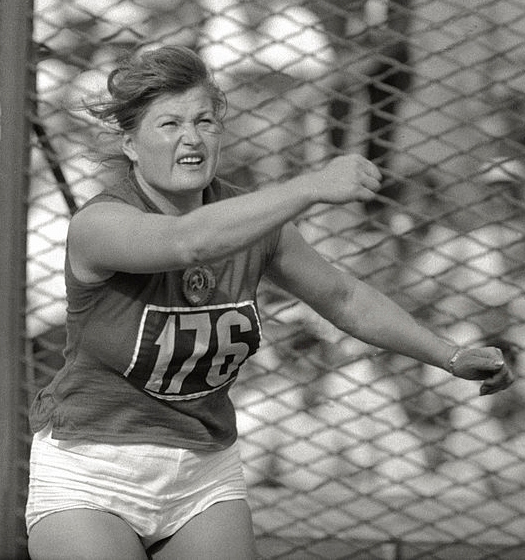
- Ponomaryova at the 1960 Olympics

Personal information
- Born: 27 April 1929 Smychka, Sverdlovsk Oblast, Russian SFSR, Soviet Union
- Died: 19 August 2016 (aged 87) Moscow, Russia
- Resting place: Federal Military Memorial Cemetery, Moscow Oblast
- Height: 1.73 m (5 ft 8 in)
- Weight: 84 kg (185 lb)

Sport
- Sport: Athletics
- Event: Discus throw
- Club: Soviet Army

Achievements and titles
- Personal best: 56.62 (1955)
Medal record
Women's athletics
Representing the Soviet Union
Olympic Games
Gold medal – first place	1952 Helsinki	Discus throw
Gold medal – first place	1960 Rome	Discus throw
Bronze medal – third place	1956 Melbourne	Discus throw
European Championships
Gold medal – first place	1954 Bern	Discus throw

Nina Apollonovna Ponomaryova (née Romashkova; Russian: Нина Аполлоновна Пономарёва (Ромашкова); 27 April 1929 – 19 August 2016) was a Russian discus thrower and the first Soviet Olympic champion.

== Career ==
Ponomaryova became interested in athletics in 1947, when she entered the Physical Training Faculty of the Stavropol Pedagogical Institute. Her first official performance was in 1948 at the Stavropol Krai Championships, where she set a new regional record at 30.53 m. After just three years of training she became one of the leading Soviet athletes. In 1949, she finished third at the USSR Championships. At that time an experienced coach Dmitry Markov began to train her. In 1951, Romashkova became the Soviet champion, she repeated this success in 1952–1956, 1958, and 1959.

In 1952, she was a member of the Soviet team, which participated in the Olympic Games for the first time in history. At that time the Olympic record was held since 1936 Summer Olympics by Gisela Mauermayer at 47.63 m. Ponomaryova won the qualifying round with a throw of 45.05 m (36 m was enough to qualify). In the final, after the first try Ponomaryova was second with a throw of 45.16 m, the leader being her teammate Nina Dumbadze (45.85 m). In the second try Ponomaryova improved the Olympic record by more than 3 metres (50.84 m). After that she was the leader until the end of the competition. In the third try she set the Olympic record at 51.42 m and earned the first Olympic gold medal for the Soviet Union.

Less than a month after the 1952 Summer Olympics, on 9 August 1952 in Odesa, Ponomaryova set a new world record at 53.61 m. In 1954, she won a European title, and in 1956 an Olympic bronze medal. In 1957, she was awarded the Order of the Red Banner of Labour. In 1960, Ponomaryova became an Olympic champion for the second time. In 1966, she finished her career and worked as a coach, first in Kiev, and after 1998 in Moscow.

== Personal life ==
Soon after the 1952 Olympics, Ponomaryova married and gave birth to a son.

In 1956, she pled guilty to shoplifting five hats from a store in London. The story made front-page news for weeks, as the Soviet government asked for the charges to be dropped and the British government refused. She claimed that she had paid for the hats but had not kept the receipt, as they did not exist in the Soviet Union.

== Quote ==
"Only after I had felt a heavy golden circle in my hand, I realized what happened. I am the first Soviet Olympic Champion, you know, the first record-holder of the 15th Olympiad...Tears were stinging my eyes. How happy I was!..." After her win at the 1952 Summer Olympics.

Records
Preceded by (Soviet Union) Nina Dumbadze	Women's Discus World Record Holder; 9 August 1952 – 18 October 1952	Succeeded by (Soviet Union) Nina Dumbadze
