= Jacqueline Mazéas =

French discus thrower

Olympic medal record

Women's athletics

Representing France
Bronze medal – third place	1948 London	Discus throw

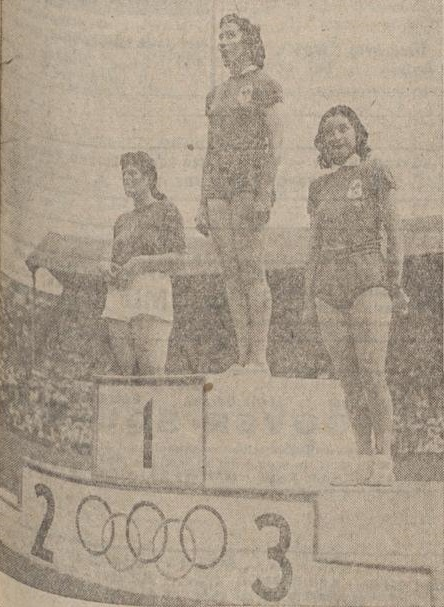
Mazeas on the podium at the 1948 Summer Olympics

Jacqueline Mazéas, née Jacqueline Martin, (10 October 1920 – 9 July 2012) was a French athlete who competed mainly in the discus event. She was born in Denain, Nord. She competed for France in the 1948 Summer Olympics held in London, United Kingdom in the discus where she won the bronze medal.
