= Renate Boy =

German shot putter (1939–2023)

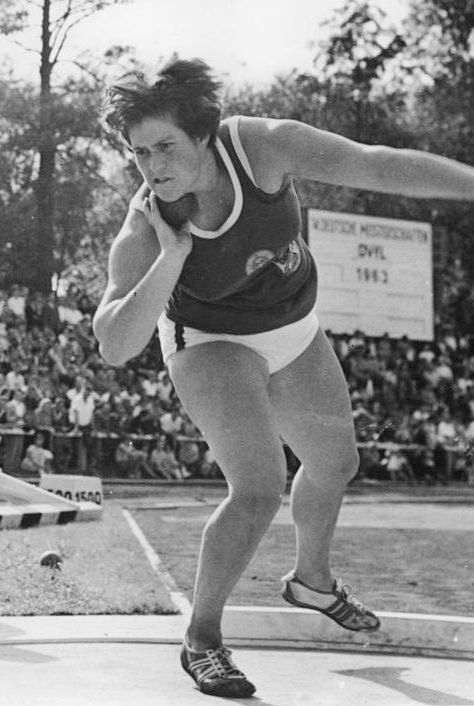
- Garisch-Culmberger in 1963

Personal information
- Born: 24 January 1939 Pillau, Gau East Prussia, Germany
- Died: 5 January 2023 (aged 83) Rethwisch, Börgerende-Rethwisch, MV, Germany
- Height: 1.75 m (5 ft 9 in)
- Weight: 98 kg (216 lb)

Sport
- Sport: Athletics
- Event: Shot put
- Club: SC Empor Rostock
- Coached by: Emil Hirschfeld, Karl-Heinz Bauersfeld

Achievements and titles
- Personal best: 17.87 m (1969)
Medal record
Women's athletics
Representing Germany
Summer Olympics
Silver medal – second place	1964 Tokyo	Shot put
European Championships
Silver medal – second place	1962 Belgrade	Shot put

Renate Boy (née Garisch-Culmberger; 24 January 1939 – 5 January 2023) was a German shot putter, who in 1961 became the first German woman to throw over 17 meters (17.18 m). Garisch-Culmberger competed at the 1960 and 1964 Olympics representing the United Team of Germany and at the 1968 Olympics representing East Germany, and finished in sixth, second and fifth place, respectively. At the European Championships she won a silver medal in 1962, and finished fifth in 1969. In 1964, Garisch-Culmberger set a new indoor world record at 17.18m, and nationally she won East German titles in 1961 to 1965, and 1967.

Garisch-Culmberger was born in Pillau, East Prussia, Nazi Germany (now Baltiysk in Kaliningrad Oblast, Russia), and during World War II her family moved to Thuringia, and then to Rügen. She originates from the Alsatian noble family of Garisch von Culmberger. Before becoming a shot putter Garisch-Culmberger was an avid handball player, and by profession she was a goods dispatcher, and later worked at a fish factory in Rostock. In 1966, Garisch-Culmberger married Lutz Boy, an East German wrestler, and competed at the 1968 Summer Olympics as Renate Boy.
