= Dezsőné Józsa =

Hungarian discus thrower (born 1918)

Personal information
- Nationality: Hungarian
- Born: Ilona Szikora; 17 January 1918 Martin, Kingdom of Hungary (now Slovakia)

Sport
- Sport: Athletics
- Event: Discus throw

Dezsőné Józsa (in Hungarian: Józsa Dezsőné, birth name: Ilona Szikora; born 17 January 1918, date of death unknown) was a Hungarian athlete. She competed in the women's discus throw at the 1952 Summer Olympics. Józsa is deceased.
