= Novokiyevka =

Novokiyevka Новокиевка
- Selo
- Location within Amur Oblast Location within Russia
- Coordinates: 51°40′N 128°54′E
- Country: Russia
- Region: Amur Oblast
- District: Mazanovsky District
- Time zone: UTC+9:00

Novokiyevka (Russian: Новокиевка) is a rural locality (a selo) in Novokiyevsky Selsoviet of Mazanovsky District, Amur Oblast, Russia. The population was 106 as of 2018. There are 17 streets.

== Geography ==
Novokiyevka is the satellite of Novokiyevsky Uval, 2 km north of Novokiyevsky Uval (the district's administrative centre) by road. Novokiyevsky Uval is the nearest rural locality.
