= Regina Branner =

Austrian shot putter

Personal information
- Nationality: Austrian
- Born: 5 September 1931
- Died: 21 February 2017 (aged 85)

Sport
- Sport: Athletics
- Event: Shot put

Regina Branner (5 September 1931 – 21 February 2017) was an Austrian athlete. She competed in the women's shot put at the 1956 Summer Olympics.
