= Wilfriede Hoffmann =

German shot putter

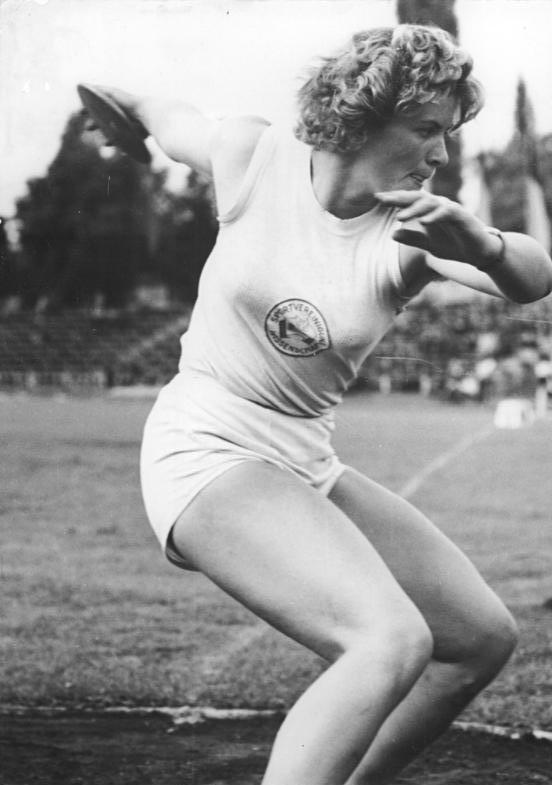

Personal information
- Nationality: German
- Born: 27 November 1932 Rataje, Poland
- Died: 28 January 2010 (aged 77)

Sport
- Sport: Athletics
- Event: Shot put

Wilfriede Hoffmann (27 November 1932 – 28 January 2010) was a German athlete. She competed in the women's shot put at the 1960 Summer Olympics.
