= Meeri Saari =

Finnish shot putter (1925–2018)

Meeri Saari (16 September 1925 – 1 October 2018) was a Finnish shot putter who competed in the 1952 Summer Olympics.
