= Elżbieta Krysińska =

Polish shot putter (1928–2018)

Personal information
- Nationality: Polish
- Born: 28 January 1928 Stary Brześć, Poland
- Died: 3 December 2018 (aged 90) Warsaw, Poland
- Height: 1.64 m (5 ft 5 in)
- Weight: 68 kg (150 lb)

Sport
- Sport: Athletics
- Event: Shot put
- Club: Spójnia Warsaw (1950–1955); Sparta Warsaw (1956–1964)

Elżbieta Krysińska (married Niedzielska; 28 January 1928 – 3 December 2018) was a Polish athlete. She competed in the women's shot put at the 1952 Summer Olympics.

Her personal best in the shot put was 12.85 meters set in Kraków in 1952. After retiring from athletics, she competed in rowing.

== International competitions ==
Year	Competition	Venue	Position	Event	Notes
Representing Poland
1952	Olympic Games	Helsinki, Finland	16th (q)	Shot put	11.50 m
