= Lidiya Sharamovich =

Bulgarian shot putter

Personal information
- Nationality: Bulgarian
- Born: 12 July 1937 (age 89) Ruse, Bulgaria

Sport
- Sport: Athletics
- Event: Shot put
Medal record
Representing Bulgaria
Summer Universiade
Gold medal – first place	1959 Turin	Shot put

Lidiya Valeryanovich Sharamovich (Bulgarian: Лидия Шарамович, born 12 July 1937) is a Bulgarian athlete. She competed in the women's shot put at the 1960 Summer Olympics.
