= Lois Jackman =

Australian discus thrower

Lois Jackman-Lax
Personal information
- National team: Australia, Nauru
- Born: Lois Jackman; 4 December 1937 (age 88)

Sport
- Country: Australia
- Sport: Discus throw

Achievements and titles
- Personal best: DT: 46.01m (1961)

Lois Jackman-Lax (née Jackman, born 4 December 1937) is discus thrower from Australia who also represented Nauru.

In 1956 and 1958, as Lois Jackman, she placed first for discus throw in the Australian Track and Field Championships. In 1960 she placed second, and 1961 placed third.

Between 1956 and 1966 she represented Australia internationally in the discus throw. In the 1956 Summer Olympics she placed thirteenth. In 1958 British Empire and Commonwealth Games in Cardiff she placed sixth.

Following her marriage, she competed under the name Lois Lax and Lois Jackman-Lax. She joined the Nauru national team and represented them in the South Pacific Games. In 1966, in Nouméa, she won gold in the discus throw and silver in the 80 metres hurdles. In 1969, in Port Moresby, she defended her discus throw title, again winning first place, and placed fourth in the 80 metres hurdles.

Jackman-Lax achieved her personal best in discus throw in 1961, recording a throw of 46.01 metres.
