= Anne-Chatrine Lafrenz =

German athlete (1936–2023)

Personal information
- Nationality: German
- Born: 30 September 1936 Altgalendorf, Germany
- Died: 24 July 2023 (aged 86)

Sport
- Sport: Athletics
- Events: Shot put Discus

Anne-Chatrine Lafrenz (30 September 1936 – 24 July 2023) was a German athlete. She competed in the women's shot put and the women's discus throw at the 1956 Summer Olympics.

Lafrenz died on 24 July 2023, at the age of 86.
