= Irina Beglyakova =

Soviet discus thrower (1933–2018)

Medal record

Women's athletics

Representing Soviet Union

Olympic Games
Silver medal – second place	1956 Melbourne	Discus throw

European Championships
Silver medal – second place	1954 Bern	Discus throw

Irina Anatolyevna Beglyakova, née Chelnaya, (Russian: Ири́на Анатолъевна Бегляко́ва; February 26, 1933 – March 19, 2018) was a Soviet athlete who competed mainly in the discus throw. She trained at Burevestnik in Moscow.

She competed for the USSR in the 1956 Summer Olympics held in Melbourne, Australia in the Discus where she won the silver medal.
