= Frieda Tiltsch =

Austrian discus thrower

Personal information
- Nationality: Austrian
- Born: 21 February 1922
- Died: 11 July 1994 (aged 72)

Sport
- Sport: Athletics
- Event: Discus throw

Frieda Tiltsch (21 February 1922 – 11 July 1994) was an Austrian athlete. She competed in the women's discus throw at the 1948 Summer Olympics and the 1952 Summer Olympics.
