= Gudrun Arenander =

Swedish discus thrower (1921–2020)

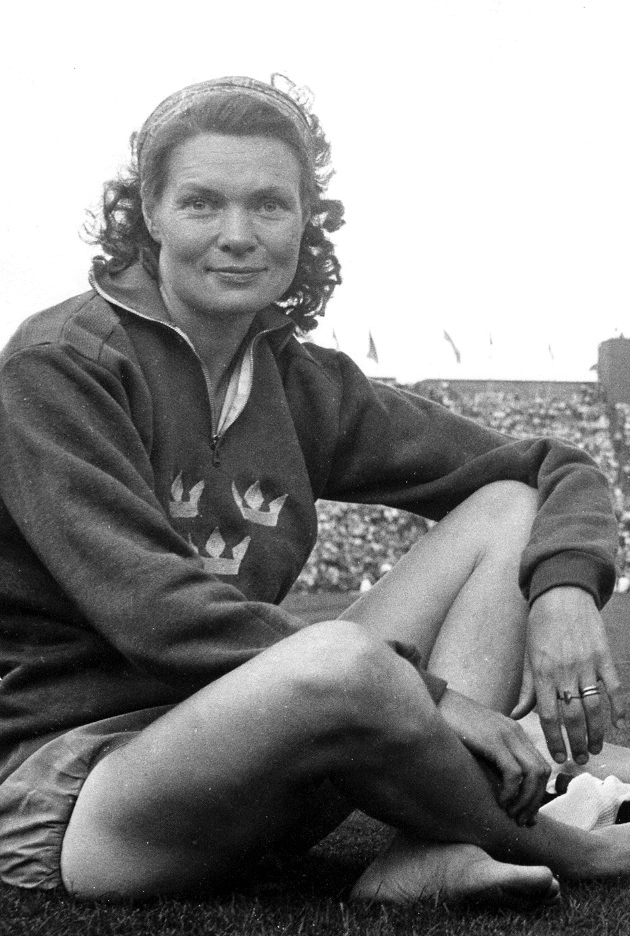

Personal information
- Born: 25 March 1921 Lovö, Ekerö, Sweden
- Died: 28 August 2020 (aged 99)

Sport
- Sport: Athletics
- Event(s): Discus throw, javelin throw
- Club: IFK Lidingö

Achievements and titles
- Personal best(s): DT – 40.37 m (1943); JT – 34.40 m (1945)

Gudrun Eivor Elisabeth Arenander (née Eklund, 25 March 1921 – 28 August 2020) was a Swedish discus thrower. She made her athletic debut at a championship in Gothenburg in 1943, setting her personal best throw of 40.37 m. She became a member of IFK Lidingö in 1944 and placed fourth at the 1946 European Athletics Championships and 12th at the 1948 Summer Olympics. Arenander won the Swedish discus title in 1942–43 and 1945–47 and was the captain of the Swedish women's athletics team. She was also an international handball player. After retiring from competitions she worked as a sports administrator.
