= Tamara Tyshkevich =

Soviet shot putter

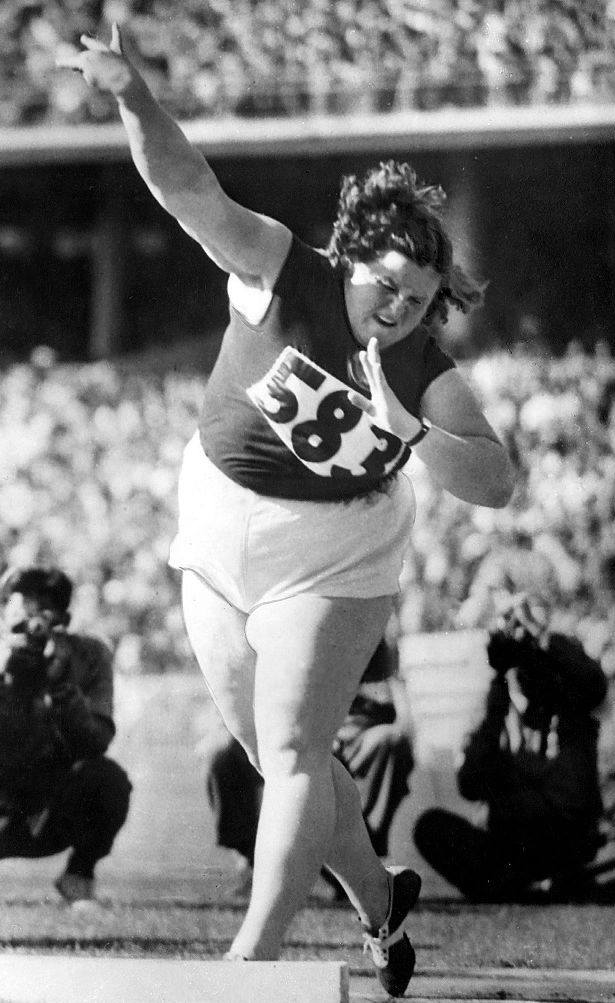
- Tyshkevich at the 1956 Olympics

Personal information
- Born: 31 March 1931 Ikonki, Vitebsk Oblast, Byelorussian SSR, Soviet Union
- Died: 27 December 1997 (aged 66) Saint Petersburg, Russia
- Height: 170 cm (5 ft 7 in)
- Weight: 116 kg (256 lb)

Sport
- Sport: Athletics
- Events: Shot put, discus throw

Achievements and titles
- Personal bests: SP – 16.59 m (1956); DT – 45.36 m (1952)
Medal record
Women's athletics
Representing Soviet Union
Olympic Games
Gold medal – first place	1956 Melbourne	Shot put
European Championships
Bronze medal – third place	1954 Bern	Shot put
Silver medal – second place	1958 Stockholm	Shot put

Tamara Andreevna Tyshkevich (Belarusian: Тамара Андрэеўна Тышкевіч, Russian: Тамара Андреевна Тышкевич; 31 March 1931 – 27 December 1997) was a Soviet shot putter. She won an Olympic gold medal in 1956 and placed fourth in 1952, losing to her long-term rival Galina Zybina. At the European championships she won a bronze medal in 1954 and a silver in 1958.

Tyshkevich was born in Belarus. During World War II her family fled to Saint Petersburg, Russia, where she spent most of her life. She took up athletics in 1947 and retired in 1962, becoming an athletics coach.
