= Yelizaveta Bagryantseva =

Russian discus thrower

Personal information
- Born: 27 August 1929 Usolye-Sibirskoye, Irkutsk Oblast, Russian SFSR, Soviet Union
- Died: 24 January 1996 (aged 66)
- Height: 170 cm (5 ft 7 in)
- Weight: 76 kg (168 lb)

Sport
- Sport: Athletics
- Event: Discus throw
- Club: Iskra

Achievements and titles
- Personal best: 49.20 m (1953)
Medal record
Representing the Soviet Union
Olympic Games
Silver medal – second place	1952 Helsinki	Discus throw

Yelisaveta Petrovna Bagryantseva (Russian: Елизавета Петровна Багрянцева, 27 August 1929 – 24 January 1996) was a Russian discus thrower who won a silver medal at the 1952 Summer Olympics.

Bagryantseva was born in a Siberian salt-mining town and first trained in cross-country skiing. She changed to discus throw only when she moved to Novosibirsk to study at the Novosibirsk College of Physical Education. She graduated in 1941, and until 1949 worked as a physical education teacher in Irkutsk. She then moved to Moscow to continue her sports studies at the Moscow Institute of Physical Education, and the same year won silver medals at the national championships and at the World Student Games. She won two more silver medals, at the 1951 World Student Games and 1952 Olympics.

Bagryantseva married the pole vaulter Yury Verkhoshansky, during a break between morning and evening sessions of the national championships. Together they later worked as athletics coaches in Russia and Italy.
