= Zinaida Doynikova =

Soviet shot putter

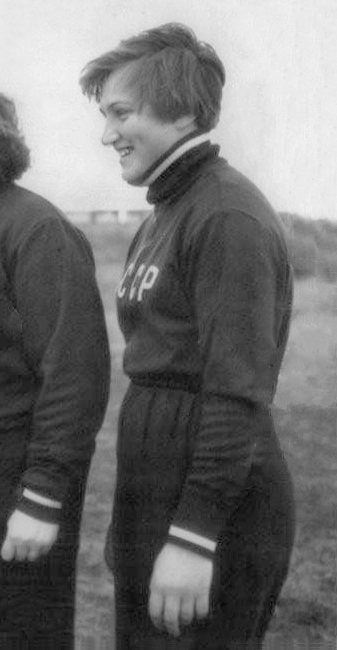
- Doynikova at the 1956 Olympics

Personal information
- Nationality: Soviet
- Born: 12 September 1934 (age 92) Saint Petersburg, Russia
- Died: March 2011
- Height: 173 cm (5 ft 8 in)
- Weight: 85 kg (187 lb)

Sport
- Sport: Athletics
- Event: Shot put
- Club: Zenit

Achievements and titles
- Personal best: 16.69 m (1960)

Zinaida Vasiliyevna Doynikova (Russian: Зинаида Васильевна Дойникова; 12 September 1934 – March 2011) was a Soviet shot putter. She placed fourth and fifth at the 1956 and 1960 Summer Olympics, respectively.
