= Ans Panhorst-Niesink =

Dutch discus thrower and shot putter

Personal information
- Born: 28 October 1918 Amsterdam, the Netherlands
- Died: 25 July 2010 (aged 91) Amsterdam, the Netherlands

Sport
- Sport: Discus throw, shot put
- Club: Sagitta, Amsterdam
Medal record
Women's athletics
Representing the Netherlands
European Championships
Silver medal – second place	1946 Oslo	Discus throw

Anna Elisabeth "Ans" Panhorst-Niesink (28 October 1918 – 25 July 2010) was a Dutch athlete. She competed at the 1936 and 1948 Summer Olympics in the discus throw and finished in seventh and sixth place, respectively. In 1948 she also competed in the shot put, but failed to reach the final. She finished second and sixth in the discus throw and shot put, respectively, at the 1946 European Athletics Championships.

She was born Anna Niesink, then married and changed her last name to Panhorst-Niesink, and then to Woltman.

Niesink first trained in basketball and sprint, but then shifted to throwing events, in which she soon become a national leader – between 1937 and 1954 she won seven shot put and at least 14 discus titles and held the national records in both events. She continued competing in her forties, winning a medal in the Dutch championships at age 43.
