= Milena Usenik =

Slovenian shot putter (1934–2023)

Personal information
- Nationality: Slovenian
- Born: 9 September 1934 Veliki Vrh, Yugoslavia
- Died: 31 March 2023 (aged 88) Logatec, Slovenia

Sport
- Sport: Athletics
- Event: Shot put
Medal record
Representing Yugoslavia
Summer Universiade
Silver medal – second place	1959 Turin	Shot put

Milena Usenik (9 September 1934 – 31 March 2023) was a Slovenian athlete and artist. She competed in the women's shot put at the 1956 Summer Olympics and the 1960 Summer Olympics, representing Yugoslavia.
