= Anni Bruk =

Austrian shot putter (1924–1998)

Personal information
- Nationality: Austrian
- Born: 20 July 1924
- Died: 20 October 1998 (aged 74)

Sport
- Sport: Athletics
- Event: Shot put

Anni Bruk (20 July 1924 – 20 October 1998) was an Austrian athlete. She competed in the women's shot put at the 1948 Summer Olympics.
