= Julija Matej =

Serbian discus thrower (born 1925)

Personal information
- Nationality: Serbian
- Born: 20 November 1925
- Died: before 2012

Sport
- Sport: Athletics
- Event: Discus throw

Julija Matej (20 November 1925 – before 2012) was a Serbian athlete. She competed in the women's discus throw at the 1948 Summer Olympics.
