= Klavdiya Tochonova =

Soviet athlete (1921–2004)

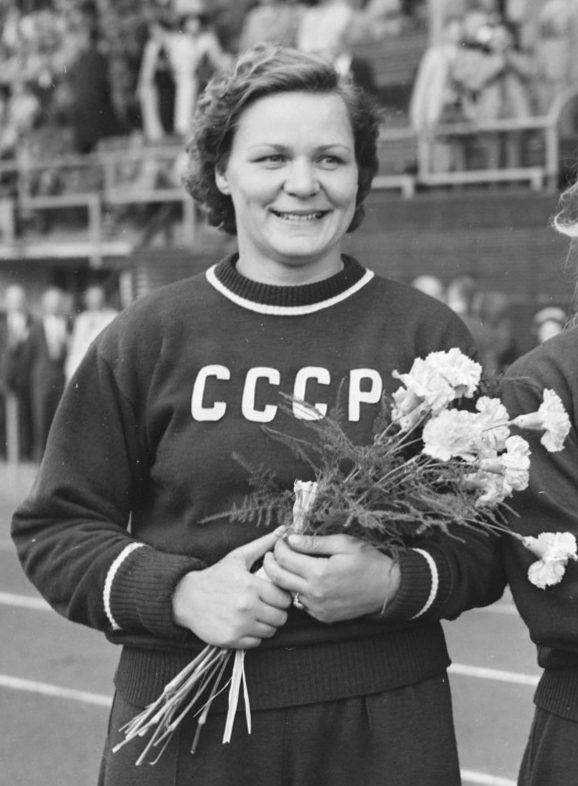
- Tochonova at the 1952 Olympics

Personal information
- Born: 16 November 1921 Kostonosovo, Tver, Russian SFSR
- Died: 30 May 2004 (aged 82)
- Height: 1.78 m (5 ft 10 in)
- Weight: 71 kg (157 lb)

Sport
- Sport: Shot put
- Club: Medik Leningrad

Achievements and titles
- Personal best: 15.09 m (1952)
Medal record
Men's athletics
Representing Soviet Union
Olympic Games
Bronze medal – third place	1952 Helsinki	Shot put
European Championships
Silver medal – second place	1950 Brussels	Shot put
World Festival of Youth and Students
Gold medal – first place	1949 Budapest	Shot put
Gold medal – first place	1951 Berlin	Shot put

Klavdiya Aleksandrovna Tochonova (Russian: Клавдия Александровна Точёнова; 16 November 1921 – 30 May 2004) was a Soviet track and field athlete who competed mainly in the shot put. She won a bronze medal at the 1952 Summer Olympics and silver at the 1950 European Championships. In October 1949 she set a world record of 14.86 m in Tbilisi. Tochonova won the shot put event at the 1949 and 1951 World Student Games and at the 1951 Soviet championships. After retiring from competitions she worked as an athletics coach in Saint Petersburg.
