= Nada Kotlušek =

Slovenian athlete

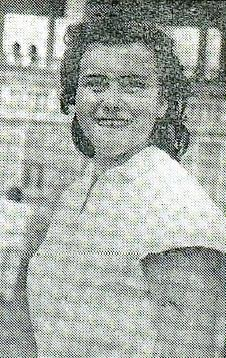
- Nada Kotlušek in 1952

Personal information
- Nationality: Slovenian
- Born: 9 August 1934 (age 91)

Sport
- Sport: Athletics
- Event(s): Shot put Discus

Nada Kotlušek (born 9 August 1934) is a Slovenian athlete. She competed in the women's shot put at the 1952 Summer Olympics and the 1956 Summer Olympics, representing Yugoslavia.
