= Jaroslava Komárková =

Czech shot putter

Jaroslava Křítková-Komárková
Personal information
- Nationality: Czech
- Born: 23 April 1927 České Budějovice, Czechoslovakia
- Died: 26 October 2010 (aged 83)

Sport
- Sport: Athletics
- Event: Shot put

Jaroslava Komárková (married name Křítková; 23 April 1927 – 26 October 2010) was a Czech athlete. She competed in the women's shot put at the 1948 Summer Olympics and the 1952 Summer Olympics.
