= Gretel Bolliger =

Swiss athlete

Personal information
- Nationality: Swiss
- Born: 3 December 1921
- Died: 20 July 2009 (aged 87)

Sport
- Sport: Track and field
- Event: 80 metres hurdles

Gretel Bolliger (3 December 1921 – 20 July 2009) was a Swiss athlete. She competed in four track and field events at the 1952 Summer Olympics.
