= Eivor Olson =

Swedish athlete (1922–2016)

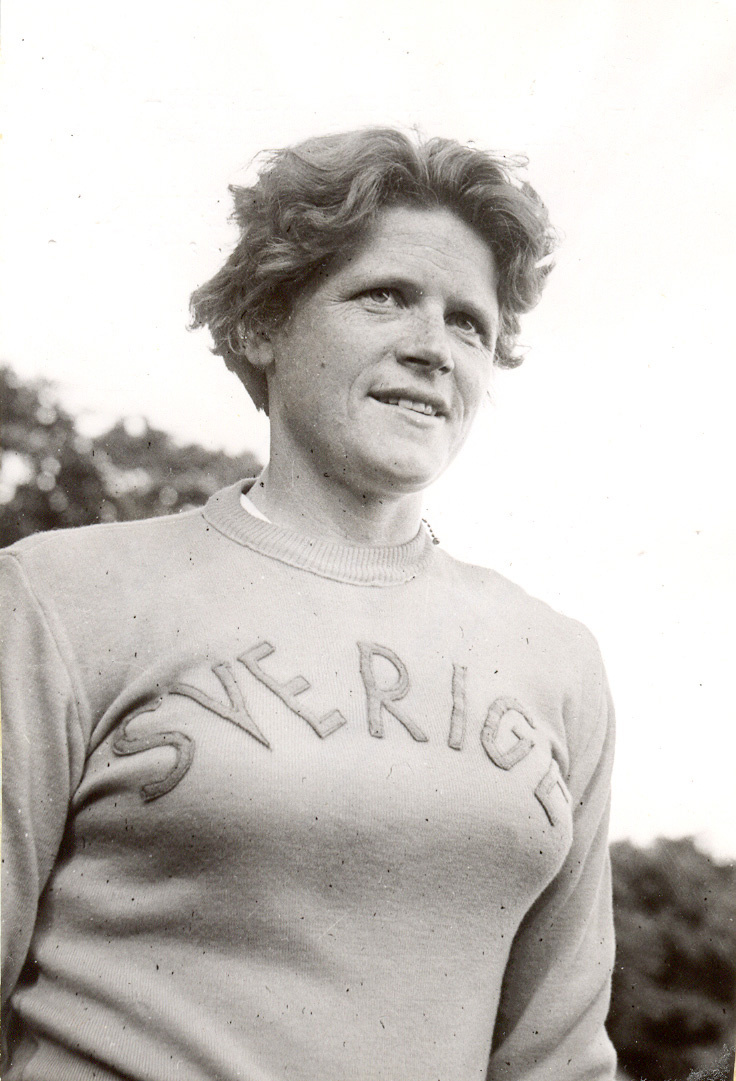

Personal information
- Born: 27 September 1922 Gothenburg, Sweden
- Died: 12 November 2016 (aged 94)
- Height: 1.75 m (5 ft 9 in)
- Weight: 75 kg (165 lb)

Sport
- Sport: Athletics
- Event(s): Shot put, discus throw, javelin throw
- Club: Redbergslids IK, Göteborg

Achievements and titles
- Personal best(s): SP – 13.29 m (1955); DT – 36.27 m (1945)

Eivor Olga Beatrice Olson (born Lagman; 27 September 1922 – 12 November 2016) was a Swedish athlete who competed mostly in the shot put. In this event she finished fifth at the 1946 European Athletics Championships, 11th at the 1948 Summer Olympics and 13th at the 1952 Summer Olympics. Olson was the Swedish champion in the shot put (1943–56) and javelin throw (1944–45) and finished second-third in the discus throw in 1942–43, 1944–45 and 1950. In 1955 she set a national record in the shot put.
