= Marija Radosavljević =

Yugoslav shot putter

Marija Radosavljević (Serbian: Марија Радосављевић; born 18 July 1927) is a retired Yugoslav shot putter who represented FPR Yugoslavia at the 1948 Summer Olympics and 1952 Summer Olympics. She finished 7th at both Olympics. She was born in Valjevo.

Awards
Preceded by Milica Šumak	Yugoslav Sportswoman of the Year; 1952	Succeeded by Milka Babović
