= Micheline Ostermeyer =

French athlete and concert pianist (1922–2001)

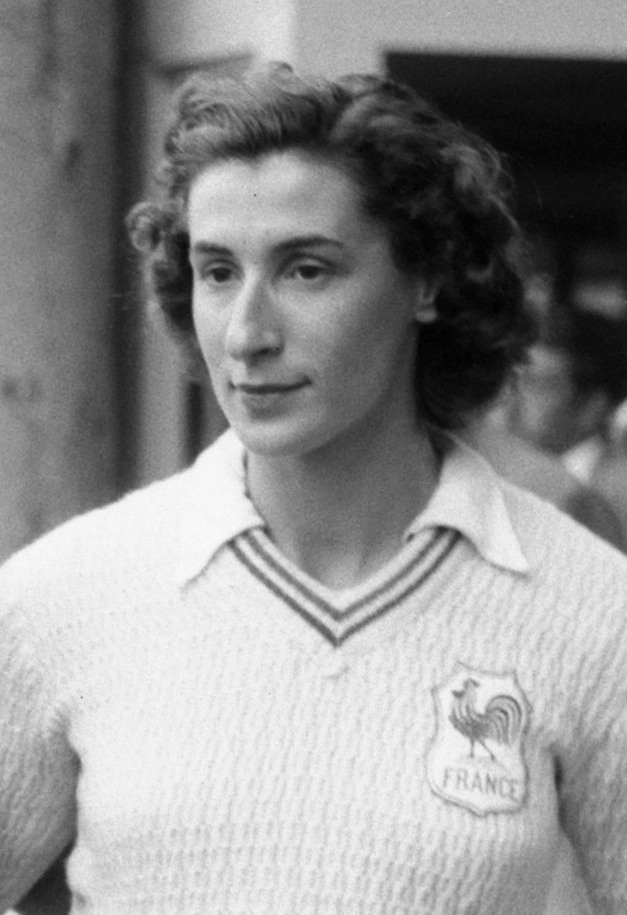
- Ostermeyer at the 1950 European Championships

Personal information
- Born: 23 December 1922 Rang-du-Fliers, France
- Died: 17 October 2001 (aged 78) Bois-Guillaume, France
- Height: 1.79 m (5 ft 10 in)
- Weight: 73 kg (161 lb)

Sport
- Sport: Athletics
- Club: Orientale, Tunis
Medal record
Women's athletics
Representing France
Olympic Games
Gold medal – first place	1948 London	Shot put
Gold medal – first place	1948 London	Discus throw
Bronze medal – third place	1948 London	High jump
European Championships
Silver medal – second place	1946 Oslo	Shot put
Bronze medal – third place	1950 Brussels	Shot put
Bronze medal – third place	1950 Brussels	80 m hurdles

Micheline Ostermeyer (23 December 1922 – 17 October 2001) was a French athlete and concert pianist. She won three medals at the 1948 Summer Olympics in shot put, discus throw, and high jump. After retiring from sports in 1950, she became a full-time pianist for fifteen years and then turned to teaching afterwards.

== Biography ==
A great-niece of the French author Victor Hugo and a niece of the composer Lucien Laroche, Ostermeyer was born in Rang-du-Fliers, Pas-de-Calais. At the insistence of her mother, she began learning piano at the age of 4, and at 14 she left her family's home in Tunisia to attend the Conservatoire de Paris. After the outbreak of World War II, she moved back to Tunisia where she performed a weekly half-hour piano recital on Radio Tunis.

It was during her return stay in Tunisia that Ostermeyer began participating in sports, competing in basketball and track and field events. After the war, she continued her participation in athletics while resuming her education at the Conservatoire. She competed in a range of contests, eventually winning 13 French titles in running, throwing, and jumping events. In 1946, she placed second in the shot put at the European Athletics Championship in Oslo, as well as winning the Prix Premier at the Conservatoire.

The 1948 Summer Olympics were Ostermeyer's finest hour as an athlete. She won gold medals in the shot put and discus throw (despite having picked up a discus for the first time just a few weeks before the event), and a bronze medal in the high jump. She is the first French woman to win an Olympic medal in athletics. Her performance was overshadowed only by that of Dutch Fanny Blankers-Koen, who won four gold medals at the same London Olympiad. After winning the shot put, Ostermeyer concluded the day with an impromptu performance of a Beethoven concert at her team's headquarters and a concert at Royal Albert Hall.

She retired from sports in 1950 after having won two bronze medals at that year's European Championships and continued to pursue a career in music. Her athletic prowess damaged her reputation as a concert pianist, however, and she even avoided playing anything composed by Franz Liszt for six years because she considered him too "sportif". She toured for fifteen years before personal commitments, including the death of her husband, led her to take a teaching job, a post she held until her retirement in the early 1980s. In her final years, she emerged from retirement to give a series of concerts in both France and Switzerland before her death in Bois-Guillaume.

At the 2016 Summer Olympics, Ostermeyer was inducted into the Olympians for Life project.

== Bibliography ==
- Bloit, Michel (1996). Micheline Ostermeyer, ou, La vie partagée. Paris: L'Harmattan. ISBN 2-7384-3892-X.
- Hampton, Janie (2008). The Austerity Olympics: When the Games Came to London in 1948. London: Aurum Press. ISBN 978-1-84513-334-4.
