= Marianne Werner =

West German athlete (1924–2023)

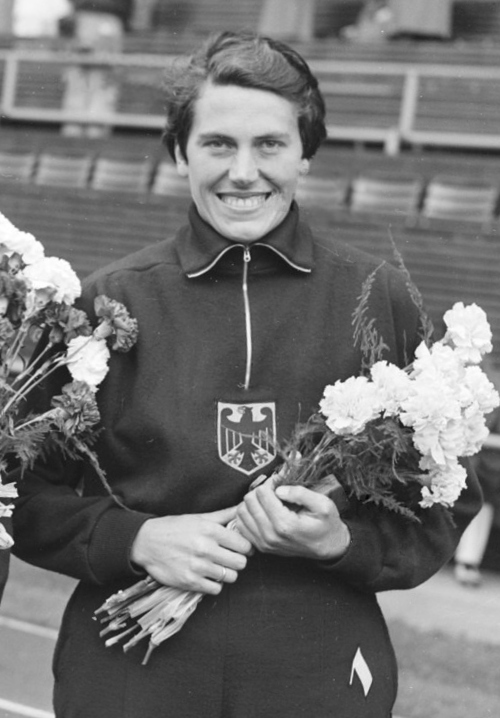
- Werner at the 1952 Olympics

Personal information
- Born: 4 January 1924 Dülmen, Westphalia, Prussia, Germany
- Died: 22 July 2023 (aged 99)
- Height: 1.74 m (5 ft 9 in)
- Weight: 83 kg (183 lb)

Sport
- Sport: Shot put, discus throw, javelin throw
- Club: SSV 04 Wuppertal; SC Greven 09

Achievements and titles
- Personal bests: SP – 15.84 m (1958); DT – 48.36 m (1955); JT – 42.70 m (1948)
Medal record
Representing West Germany
Olympic Games
Silver medal – second place	1952 Helsinki	Shot put
European Championships
Gold medal – first place	1958 Stockholm	Shot put
Representing Germany
Olympic Games
Bronze medal – third place	1956 Melbourne	Shot put

Marianne Werner (German pronunciation: [maˈʁi̯anə ˈvɛʁnɐ]; née Schulze-Entrup, later Ader; 4 January 1924 – 22 July 2023) was a West German athlete who specialized in throwing events. She competed in the shot put and discus throw at the 1952 and 1956 Olympics and earned two medals in the shot put. Werner won the European title in this event in 1958 and finished fifth in 1954.

Werner died on 22 July 2023, at the age of 99.

Awards
Preceded by (Germany) Wiltrud Urselmann	German Sportswoman of the Year; 1958	Succeeded by (Germany) Marika Kilius
