= Galina Zybina =

Russian athlete and coach (1931–2024)

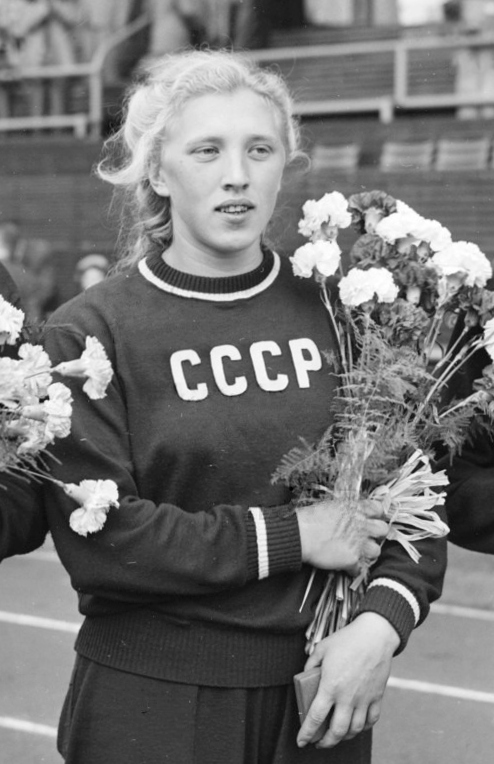
- Zybina at the 1952 Olympics

Personal information
- Born: 22 January 1931 Leningrad, Russian SFSR, Soviet Union (now Saint Petersburg, Russia)
- Died: 10 August 2024 (aged 93) Saint Petersburg, Russia
- Height: 1.68 m (5 ft 6 in)
- Weight: 80 kg (176 lb)

Sport
- Sport: Shot put Discus throw Javelin throw
- Club: Zenit Leningrad; Trud Leningrad
- Coached by: Viktor Alekseyev

Achievements and titles
- Personal bests: 17.50 m (SP, 1964); 48.62 m (DT, 1955); 54.98 m (JT, 1958)
Medal record
Women's athletics
Representing Soviet Union
Olympic Games
Gold medal – first place	1952 Helsinki	Shot put
Silver medal – second place	1956 Melbourne	Shot put
Bronze medal – third place	1964 Tokyo	Shot put
European Championships
Gold medal – first place	1954 Bern	Shot put
Bronze medal – third place	1950 Brussels	Javelin
Bronze medal – third place	1954 Bern	Discus throw
Bronze medal – third place	1962 Belgrade	Shot put

Galina Ivanovna Zybina (Russian: Гали́на Ива́новна Зы́бина; 22 January 1931 – 10 August 2024) was a Soviet and Russian athlete and coach. She competed in the shot put at the 1952, 1956, 1960 and 1964 Olympics and finished in first, second, seventh and third place, respectively; in 1952, she also finished fourth in the javelin throw. Between 1952 and 1956, she set eight consecutive world records and 14 national records in the shot put. In 1953, she became the first woman to throw over 16 meters when she threw 16.20 m.

== Biography ==
As a child Zybina was much weakened by hunger and cold during the Siege of Leningrad in World War II, which killed her mother and brother, while her father died at the front lines. Yet, by 1950, she had become a top Soviet thrower and won a bronze in the javelin at the European championships. During her entire career as a competitor and coach Zybina accentuated technique rather than strength. Owing to her age, she was left out of the Soviet team before the 1968 Olympics and retired in 1969, although she was still the second-best Soviet shot putter at the time. In retirement she worked as athletics coach in Värska.

Zybina was married to Yury Fyodorov, a Russian captain and commander of the Russian cruiser Aurora in 1964–85. The cruiser was famous for starting the 1917 October Revolution, but by the 1960s was a museum ship. In 1959, she gave birth to a son, which caused her to demonstrate a sub-par performance at the 1960 Olympics (seventh place).

Zybina died on 10 August 2024, at the age of 93.
