= Paulette Veste =

French athlete (born 1928)

Personal information
- Nationality: France
- Born: 24 February 1928 (age 97) Lespesses

Sport
- Event(s): shot put, discus throw

Paulette Veste (born 24 February 1928) is a French former athlete, who specialised in the shot put and the discus throw.

== Biography ==
Veste was born in Lespesses. She took fourth in the shot put and tenth in the discus throw during the 1948 Olympics at London. Four years later, at the 1952 Olympics at Helsinki, she took ninth in the shot put and the sixteenth place in the discus throw. Veste won three French national titles in the shot put (1949, 1952 and 1953) and three French national titles in the discus throw(1948, 1951 and 1952). She twice improved the French discus record, bringing it to 38.83m and 40.95m in 1948.

=== Achievements ===
- French Championships in Athletics:
  - Three-time winner of the shot put in 1949, 1952 and 1953
  - Three-time winner of the discus in 1948, 1951 and 1952.

=== Records ===
personal records
| Event | Performance | Location | Date |
|---|---|---|---|
| Shot Put | 13.26 m | | 1952 |
| Discus throw | 42.28 m | | 1951 |
