= Athletics at the 1936 Summer Olympics – Men's 10,000 metres =

Men's 10,000 metres at the Games of the XI Olympiad
- Venue: Olympiastadion: Berlin, Germany
- Dates: August 2, 1936 (final)
- Competitors: 30 from 18 nations

Medalists
1st place, gold medalist(s)		Ilmari Salminen; Finland
2nd place, silver medalist(s)		Arvo Askola; Finland
3rd place, bronze medalist(s)		Volmari Iso-Hollo; Finland

The men's 10,000 metres event at the 1936 Olympic Games took place August 2. The final was won by Ilmari Salminen of Finland.

== Results ==
=== Final ===
Rank	Name	Nationality	Time	Notes
1st place, gold medalist(s)	Ilmari Salminen	Finland	30:15.4	
2nd place, silver medalist(s)	Arvo Askola	Finland	30:15.6	
3rd place, bronze medalist(s)	Volmari Iso-Hollo	Finland	30:20.2	
4	Kohei Murakoso	Japan	30:25.0	
5	Alec Burns	Great Britain	30:58.2	
6	Juan Carlos Zabala	Argentina	31:22.0	
7	Max Gebhardt	Germany	31:29.6	
8	Don Lash	United States	31:39.4	
9	Odd Rasdal	Norway	31:40.4	
10	Harry Siefert	Denmark	31:52.6	
11	Giuseppe Beviacqua	Italy	31:57.0	
12	János Kelen	Hungary	32:01.0	
13	Henning Sundesson	Sweden	32:11.8	
14	Józef Noji	Poland	32:13.0	
15	Rudolf Wöber	Austria	32:22.0	
16	Eino Pentti	United States	32:23.0	
17	Ludvík Bombík	Czechoslovakia	32:24.0	
18	Lucien Tostain	France	32:24.2	
19	André Sicard	France	32:25.0	
20	André Lonlas	France	32:58.0	
21	Walter Schönrock	Germany	32:59.0	
22	Josef Siegers	Germany		
	Pierre Bajart	Belgium		
	Scotty Rankine	Canada		
	Milton Wallace	Canada		
	William Eaton	Great Britain		
	Stanley Wudyka	United States		
	Fusashige Suzuki	Japan		
	Raunaq Singh Gill	India		DNF
	John Potts	Great Britain		DNF

Key: DNF = Did not finish
