= 1938 European Athletics Championships – Men's 5000 metres =

Athletic event in France in 1938

Men's 5000 metres at the European Athletics Championships

The men's 5000 metres at the 1938 European Athletics Championships was held in Paris, France, at Stade Olympique de Colombes on 4 September 1938.

== Medalists ==
Gold	Taisto Mäki; Finland
Silver	Henry Jonsson; Sweden
Bronze	Kauko Pekuri; Finland

== Results ==
=== Final ===
4 September

Rank	Name	Nationality	Time	Notes
1st place, gold medalist(s)	Taisto Mäki	Finland	14:26.8	CR
2nd place, silver medalist(s)	Henry Jonsson	Sweden	14:27.4	
3rd place, bronze medalist(s)	Kauko Pekuri	Finland	14:29.2	
4	Jack Emery	Great Britain	14:46.2	
5	Józef Noji	Poland	14:47.8	
6	Morrison Carstairs	Great Britain	14:51.3	
7	András Csaplár	Hungary	14:52.4	
8	Roger Rochard	France	14:55.6	
9	Odd Rasdal	Norway	15:01.0	
10	Gottfried Utiger	Switzerland	15:42.0	
11	Jean Deloge	Luxembourg	15:48.0	
	Roger Normand	France	DNF	
	István Simon	Hungary	DNF	

== Participation ==
According to an unofficial count, 13 athletes from 9 countries participated in the event.

- Finland (2)
- France (2)
- Hungary (2)
- Luxembourg (1)
- Norway (1)
- Poland (1)
- Sweden (1)
- Switzerland (1)
- Great Britain (2)
