= Athletics at the 1938 British Empire Games – Men's 1 mile =

Men's 1 mile at the 1938 British Empire Games
- Venue: Sydney Cricket Ground
- Start date: 10 February 1938
- End date: 12 February 1938
- Winning time: 4:11.6

Medalists
| gold medal | Jim Alford | Wales |
| silver medal | Gerald Backhouse | Australia |
| bronze medal | Pat Boot | New Zealand |

The men's 1 mile event at the 1938 British Empire Games was held on 10 and 12 February at the Sydney Cricket Ground in Sydney, Australia.

== Medalists ==
| Gold | Silver | Bronze |
|---|---|---|
| Jim Alford; Wales | Gerald Backhouse; Australia | Pat Boot; New Zealand |

== Results ==
=== Heats ===
Qualification: First 4 in each heat (Q) qualify directly for the final.

| Rank | Heat | Name | Nationality | Time | Notes |
|---|---|---|---|---|---|
| 1 | 1 | Jim Alford | Wales | 4:17.3 | Q |
| 2 | 1 | Robert Graham | Scotland | 4:18.8e | Q, 10 yards behind |
| 3 | 1 | Bill Pullar | New Zealand | 4:19.5e | Q, 4 yards behind |
| 4 | 1 | Theo Allen | New Zealand | 4:20.0e | Q, 4 yards behind |
| 5 | 1 | Max Fleming | Australia | ?:??.? | |
| 6 | 1 | Fred Barry-Brown | Australia | ?:??.? | |
| 7 | 1 | Abbot Conway | Canada | ?:??.? | |
| | 1 | Bill Dale | Canada | DNS | |
| | 1 | Peter Ward | England | DNS | |
| | 1 | Noel Stanford | Trinidad and Tobago | DNS | |
| 1 | 2 | Gerald Backhouse | Australia | 4:18.0 | Q |
| 2 | 2 | Pat Boot | New Zealand | ?:??.? | Q, 1.5 yards behind |
| 3 | 2 | Bernard Eeles | England | ?:??.? | Q, 15 yards behind |
| 4 | 2 | Arthur Clarke | Canada | ?:??.? | Q |
| 5 | 2 | Nicolaas Wessels | South Africa | ?:??.? | |
| 6 | 2 | Alexander Haire | Northern Ireland | ?:??.? | |
| 7 | 2 | Donald Bonham | Australia | ?:??.? | |
| | 2 | Max Lenover | Canada | DNS | |
| | 2 | Cecil Matthews | New Zealand | DNS | |

=== Final ===
| Rank | Name | Nationality | Time | Notes |
|---|---|---|---|---|
| 1st place, gold medalist(s) | Jim Alford | Wales | 4:11.6 | GR |
| 2nd place, silver medalist(s) | Gerald Backhouse | Australia | 4:12.2e | 4 yards behind |
| 3rd place, bronze medalist(s) | Pat Boot | New Zealand | 4:12.6e | 2 yards behind |
| 4 | Arthur Clarke | Canada | 4:14.4e | |
| 5 | Bernard Eeles | England | 4:15.2e | |
| 6 | Bill Pullar | New Zealand | ?:??.? | |
| | Robert Graham | Scotland | DNF | |
| | Theo Allen | New Zealand | DNF | |
