= Athletics at the 1936 Summer Olympics – Men's 5000 metres =

Men's 5000 metres at the Games of the XI Olympiad
- Venue: Olympiastadion: Berlin, Germany
- Dates: August 4, 1936 (heats); August 7, 1936 (final)
- Competitors: 41 from 23 nations

Medalists
1st place, gold medalist(s)		Gunnar Höckert; Finland
2nd place, silver medalist(s)		Lauri Lehtinen; Finland
3rd place, bronze medalist(s)		Henry Jonsson; Sweden

The men's 5000 metres event at the 1936 Olympic Games took place August 4 and August 7. The final was won by Finn Gunnar Höckert in Olympic record time.

== Results ==
=== Heats ===
The fastest five runners in each of the three heats advanced to the final round.

Heat one

Rank	Name	Nationality	Time	Notes
1	Umberto Cerati	Italy	15:01.0	
2	Harry Siefert	Denmark	15:02.8	
3	Don Lash	United States	15:04.4	
4	Ilmari Salminen	Finland	15:06.6	
5	Aubrey Reeve	Great Britain	15:06.8	
6	Åke Jansson	Sweden	15:10.0	
7	Raymond Lefebvre	France	15:15.4	
8	Edmund Stadler	Germany	15:17.0	
9	István Simon	Hungary	15:25.0	
10	Scotty Rankine	Canada		
11	Friedrich Fischer	Austria		
12	Ivan Krevs	Yugoslavia	15:40.0	
13	Mohamed Ahmed Abu Sobea	Egypt		
14	Gottfried Utiger	Switzerland		
15	Raunaq Singh Gill	India		

Heat two

Rank	Name	Nationality	Time	Notes
1	Gunnar Höckert	Finland	15:10.2	
2	Frank Close	Great Britain	15:10.6	
3	Józef Noji	Poland	15:11.2	
4	Bror Hellström	Sweden	15:12.0	
5	Rolf Hansen	Norway	15:12.6	
6	René Lécuron	France	15:14.2	
7	Henry Nielsen	Denmark	15:25.0	
8	Karl-Heinz Becker	Germany	15:27.0	
9	Tom Deckard	United States		
10	János Kelen	Hungary	15:35.0	
11	Hideo Tanaka	Japan		
12	Oscar Van Rumst	Belgium		
13	Valentín González	Mexico		

Heat three

Rank	Name	Nationality	Time	Notes
1	Henry Jonsson	Sweden	14:54.0	
2	Kohei Murakoso	Japan	14:56.6	
3	Peter Ward	Great Britain	14:59.0	
4	Lauri Lehtinen	Finland	15:00.0	
5	Louis Zamperini	United States	15:02.2	
6	Salvatore Mastroieni	Italy	15:02.2	
7	Roger Rochard	France	15:12.2	
8	Cecil Matthews	New Zealand		
9	Jenő Szilágyi	Hungary	15:20.6	
10	Max Syring	Germany		
11	Milton Wallace	Canada		
12	Hernando Navarrete	Colombia		
13	Michel Medinger Sr.	Luxembourg		

=== Final ===
Rank	Name	Nationality	Time	Notes
1st place, gold medalist(s)	Gunnar Höckert	Finland	14:22.2	OR
2nd place, silver medalist(s)	Lauri Lehtinen	Finland	14:25.8	
3rd place, bronze medalist(s)	Henry Jonsson	Sweden	14:29.0	
4	Kohei Murakoso	Japan	14:30.0	
5	Józef Noji	Poland	14:33.4	
6	Ilmari Salminen	Finland	14:39.8	
7	Umberto Cerati	Italy	14:44.4	
8	Louis Zamperini	United States	14:46.8	
9	Rolf Hansen	Norway	14:48.0	
10	Harry Siefert	Denmark	14:48.4	
11	Peter Ward	Great Britain	14:57.2	
12	Frank Close	Great Britain		
13	Don Lash	United States		
14	Bror Hellström	Sweden		
	Aubrey Reeve	Great Britain		DNF

Key: DNF = Did not finish, OR = Olympic record
