= Athletics at the 1934 British Empire Games – Men's 440 yards hurdles =

Men's 440 yards hurdles at the Commonwealth Games

The men's 440 yards hurdles event at the 1934 British Empire Games was held on 5 August at the White City Stadium in London, England.

== Results ==
Rank	Name	Nationality	Time	Notes
1st place, gold medalist(s)	Alan Hunter	Scotland	55.2	
2nd place, silver medalist(s)	Charles Reilly	Australia	55.8e	+3 yd
3rd place, bronze medalist(s)	Ralph Brown	England	56.0e	+0.5 yd
4	James Worrall	Canada	??.?	
5	John Stone	England	??.?	
6	Ashleigh Pilbrow	England	??.?	
	Ronald Wylde	Scotland	DNS	
