= 1933 AAA Championships =

Outdoor track and field competition

- Dates: 7–8 July 1933
- Host city: London, England
- Venue: White City Stadium
- Level: Senior
- Type: Outdoor
- Events: 24

The 1933 AAA Championships was the 1933 edition of the annual outdoor track and field competition organised by the Amateur Athletic Association (AAA). It was held from 7 to 8 July 1933 at White City Stadium in London, England.

The Championships consisted of 24 events and covered two days of competition and the marathon was held from Windsor to White City.

== Results ==
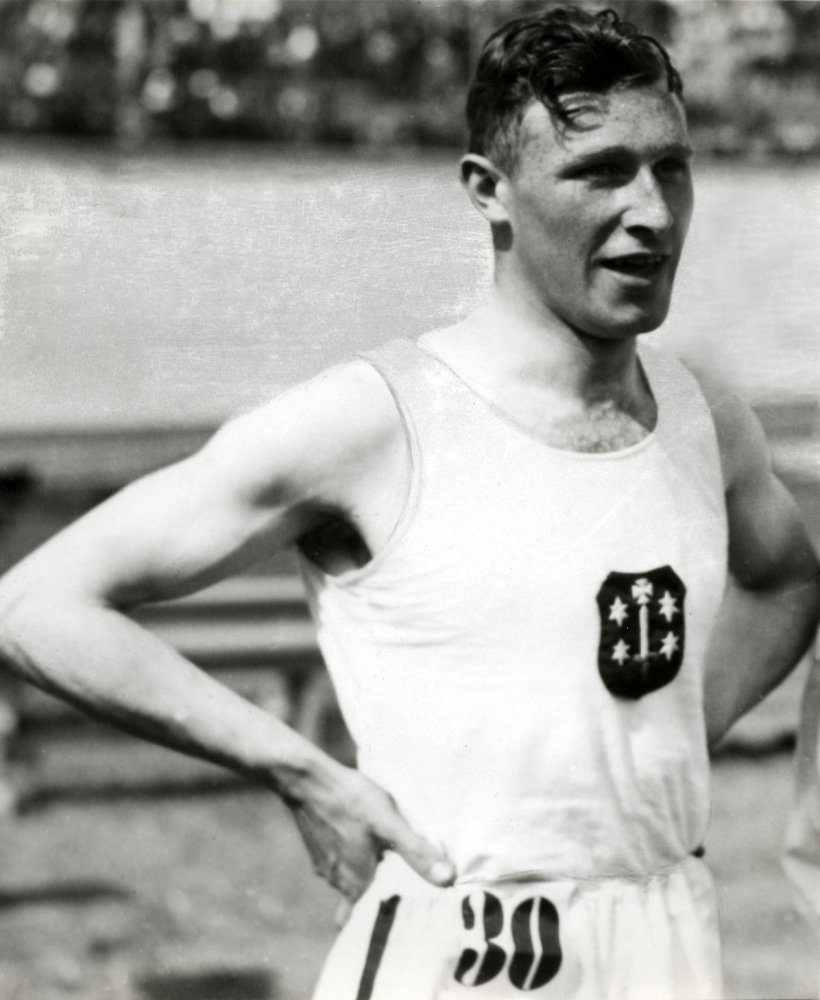
Dutchman Chris Berger won the 220 yards

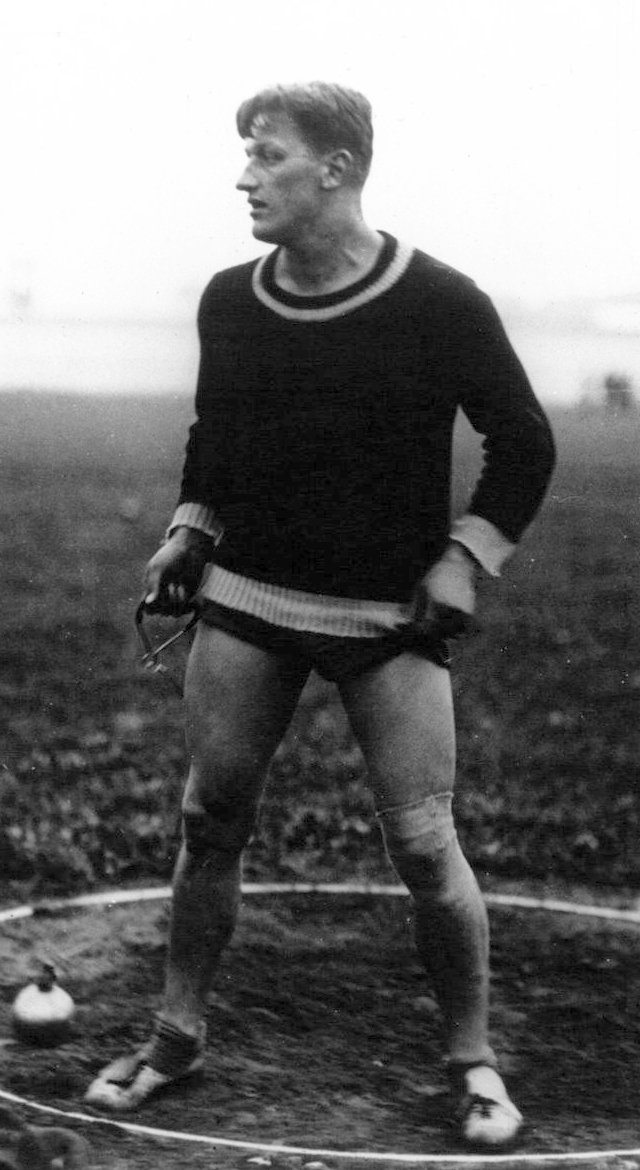
Zygmunt Heljasz won the hammer throw

Event	Gold		Silver		Bronze	
100 yards	George Saunders	9.9	(Netherlands) Chris Berger	1 ft	(Germany) Arthur Jonath	inches
220 yards	(Netherlands) Chris Berger	22.0	(Scotland) Fred Reid	1½ yd	(Scotland) Robin Murdoch	2 yd
440 yards	Frederick Wolff	49.0	Christopher Ward	49.9	Roy Moor	50.4
880 yards	Clifford Whitehead	1:54.2	Thomas Scrimshaw	1:54.5	Leslie Pearce	1:54.9
1 mile	(Wales) Reg Thomas	4:14.2	Denis Price	4:18.4	Aubrey Reeve	4:23.6
3 miles	(Finland) Lauri Lehtinen	14:09.2	(Italy) Umberto Cerati	14:37.0	Edward Denison	14:40.0
6 miles	Jack Holden	30:32.2	(Scotland) Robert Sutherland	30:50.0	(Scotland) James Wood	
10 miles	George Bailey	50:51.0	Ernest Harper	52:16.4	Reginald Walker	52:36.4
marathon	Donald Robertson	2:43:13.6	Albert Norris	2:44:40.6	Sidney Brooks	2:57:06.6
steeplechase	(Finland) Volmari Iso-Hollo	10:06.6	George Bailey	10:37.0	Ian Drew	10:43.0
120y hurdles	Don Finlay	15.0	Roland Harper	15.4	(Netherlands) Willeem Kaan	15.7
440y hurdles	(Italy) Luigi Facelli	53.6	Lord Burghley	53.8	John Stone	55.0
2 miles walk	Bert Cooper	13:39.8	(Latvia) Janis Dalins	100 yd	Leslie Dickinson	
7 miles walk	Johnny Johnson	53:01.6	(Latvia) Janis Dalins	53:35.0	Dick Edge	53:55.4
high jump	(Hungary) Mihály Bodosi	1.905	Edward Bradbrooke & (Italy) Angelo Tommasi (shared silver)			1.880
pole vault	(Italy) Danilo Innocenti	3.81	(Hungary) Viktor Zsuffka	3.73	Ian Barratt; Laurence Bond; Frank Phillipson	3.50
long jump	(Hungary) Lajos Balogh	7.07	(Hungary) Jozsef Szabo	6.96	(Northern Ireland) Edward Boyce	6.75
triple jump	(Netherlands) Jan Blankers	14.69	(Italy) Folco Gugliemi	14.39	(Northern Ireland) Edward Boyce	14.14
shot put	(Poland) Zygmunt Heljasz	15.75	Robert Howland	13.83	Kenneth Pridie	13.50
discus throw	(Hungary) Endre Madarász	44.18	(Austria) Emil Janausch	43.05	(Republic of Ireland) Paddy Bermingham	42.48
hammer throw	(Republic of Ireland) Bill Britton	44.96	(Scotland) Sandy Smith	44.08	(Republic of Ireland) George Walsh	42.29
javelin throw	William Abell	51.54	Robert Turner	51.24	G. H. Powell	49.82
440 yards relay	Preussen Krefeld	43 sec	Amsterdam		Blackheath Harriers	
Tug of war	Royal Marines					

== See also ==
- 1933 WAAA Championships
