= Schönrock =

Schönrock or Schoenrock is a German surname. Notable people with the surname include:

- Daron Schoenrock (born 1961), American baseball coach
- Mark Schoenrock, American politician
- Sybille Schönrock (born 1964), East German swimmer
- Walter Schönrock (1912–1996), German long-distance runner
