= Athletics at the 1934 British Empire Games – Men's pole vault =

Men's pole vault at the Commonwealth Games

The men's pole vault event at the 1934 British Empire Games was held on 6 August at the White City Stadium in London, England.

== Results ==
| Rank | Name | Nationality | Result | Notes |
|---|---|---|---|---|
| 1st place, gold medalist(s) | Syl Apps | Canada | 12 ft 9 in (3.89 m)* | |
| 2nd place, silver medalist(s) | Alf Gilbert | Canada | 12 ft 6 in (3.81 m) | |
| 3rd place, bronze medalist(s) | Fred Woodhouse | Australia | 12 ft 0 in (3.66 m) | |
| 4 | Andries du Plessis | South Africa | 12 ft 0 in (3.66 m) | |
| 5 | Frank Phillipson | England | 12 ft 0 in (3.66 m) | |
| 6 | Patrick Ogilvie | Scotland | 11 ft 6 in (3.51 m) | |
| | Alfred Kinally | England | ?.?? | |
| | Dick Webster | England | ?.?? | |
| | Jack Walker | England | ?.?? | |
| | Abdul Shafi Khan Burki | India | 11 ft 3/8 in (3.36 m) | |
| | Harry Hart | South Africa | DNS | |

* Apps jumped 12 feet 9 inches in a jump off for first place.
