= Medinger =

Medinger is a surname of Luxembourgish origin, derived from the village of Medingen, Luxembourg. Notable people with the surname include:

- John Medinger (born 1948), American teacher, businessman, and politician from La Crosse, Wisconsin
- Michel Medinger (1941–2025), Luxembourgish middle-distance runner, son of Michel Sr.
- Michel Medinger Sr. (1909–1992), Luxembourgish long-distance runner
