= Taisto Mäki =

Finnish long-distance runner

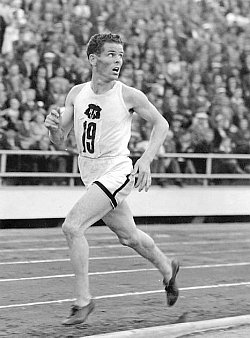
- Mäki breaks the 30-minute barrier over 10000 m in 1939

Personal information
- Born: 2 December 1910 Rekola, Finland
- Died: 1 May 1979 (aged 68)

Sport
- Sport: Athletics
- Event: 1500-10000 m

Achievements and titles
- Personal bests: 1500 m – 3:53.5 (1939); 5000 m – 14:08.8 (1939); 10000 m – 29:52.6 (1939)
Medal record
Men's athletics
Representing Finland
European Championships
Gold medal – first place	1938 Paris	5000 m

Taisto Armas Mäki (2 December 1910 – 1 May 1979) was a Finnish long-distance runner – one of the so-called "Flying Finns". Like his coach and close friend, Paavo Nurmi, Mäki broke world records over two miles, 5000 metres and 10,000 metres – holding the records simultaneously between 1939 and 1942. Mäki was the first man to run 10,000 metres in less than 30 minutes, breaking his own world record in a time of 29:52.6 on 17 September 1939.

Mäki was born in Rekola in the municipality of Vantaa. He was a shepherd by trade, earning him the nickname "Rekolan paimenpoika" (the "Rekola herdboy"). At a time when Finland dominated men's long-distance running, Mäki did not come to prominence until 1938. In September of that year, in what proved to be his only appearance at a major championships, he won the 5000 metres at the European Championships in Paris, beating Swede Henry Jonsson and fellow Finn Kauko Pekuri into second and third place with a time of 14:26.8. On 29 September 1938, less than four weeks after winning in Paris, Mäki broke the 10,000 metres world record for the first time, beating Ilmari Salminen's old record by more than three seconds in a time of 30:02.0. Mäki went on to break five world records during the following summer. On 7 June he took close to three seconds off Miklós Szabó's two mile world record, running a time of 8:53.2 in the Helsinki Olympic Stadium. Nine days later, in the same stadium, he took over eight seconds off Lauri Lehtinen's world record over 5000 metres. He followed these performances by taking close to ten seconds off his own 10,000 m world record, running 29:52.6 on 17 September.

The Winter War between Finland and the Soviet Union broke out on 30 November 1939. Like many of his fellow Flying Finns, including Gunnar Höckert and Lauri Lehtinen, Mäki was initially deployed on the Karelian Isthmus. However, along with Paavo Nurmi, he was sent on a tour of the United States in February 1940 in order to raise money for the Finnish Relief Fund. During the tour, which lasted for two months and culminated in an appearance in front of 14,000 people at Madison Square Garden, the two men raced against hand-picked American athletes. Mäki's times during the tour were well below those he had set the previous summer, the cause of which was a matter of much debate at the time. Mäki's career was cut short by service in World War II. The conflict had also caused the cancellation of the 1940 Summer Olympics in Helsinki, and with it ending Mäki's hopes of representing his country at the Olympic Games.

Records
Preceded by (Hungary) Miklós Szabó	Men's Two Miles World Record Holder; 7 June 1939 – 3 June 1942	Succeeded by (Sweden) Gunder Hägg
Preceded by (Finland) Lauri Lehtinen	Men's 5000 m World Record Holder; 16 June 1939 – 20 September 1942	Succeeded by (Sweden) Gunder Hägg
Preceded by (Finland) Ilmari Salminen	Men's 10,000 m World Record Holder; 29 September 1938 – 25 August 1944	Succeeded by (Finland) Viljo Heino
