= Gunnar Höckert =

Finnish runner (1910–1940)

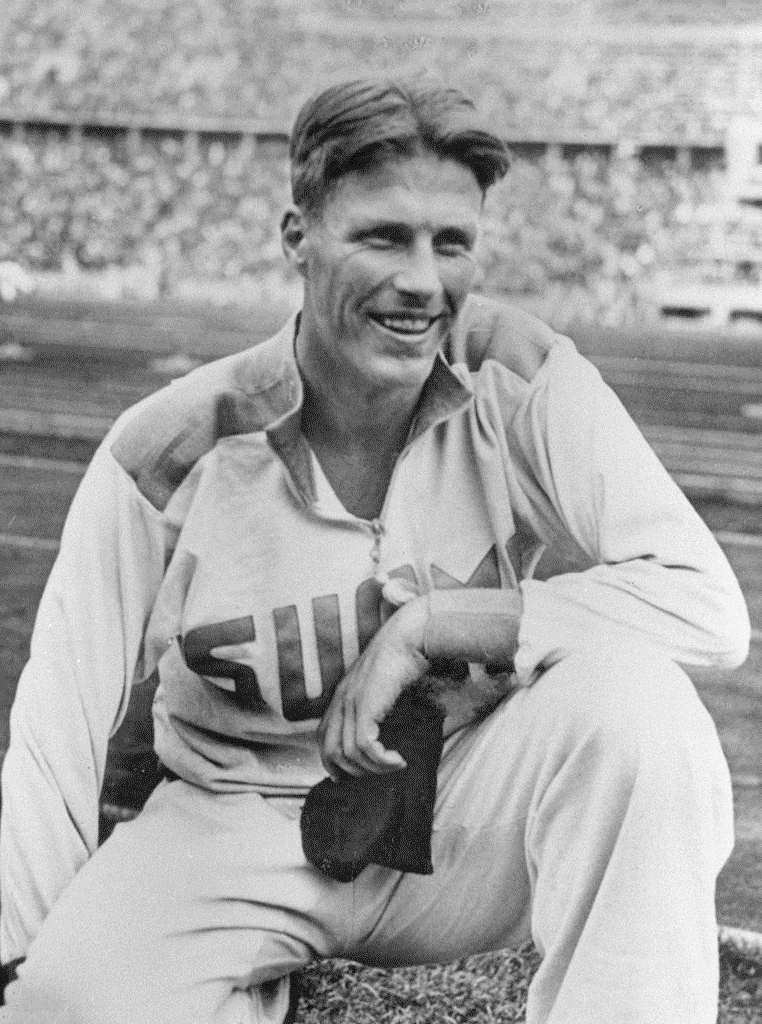
- Gunnar Höckert at the 1936 Olympics

Personal information
- Born: 12 February 1910 Helsinki, Finland
- Died: 11 February 1940 (aged 29) Johannes, Finland
- Height: 1.78 m (5 ft 10 in)
- Weight: 67–69 kg (148–152 lb)

Sport
- Sport: Athletics
- Events: 1500 m, 5000 m, steeplechase
- Club: Idrottsklubben 32, Helsinki

Achievements and titles
- Personal bests: 1500 – 3:55.2 (1936); 3000 mS – 9:26.8 (1935); 5000 m – 14:22.2 (1936)
Medal record
Representing Finland
Olympic Games
Gold medal – first place	1936 Berlin	5000 m

Gunnar Mikael Höckert (12 February 1910 – 11 February 1940) was a Finnish runner, winner of the 5000 m race at the 1936 Summer Olympics.

== Biography ==
Born in Helsinki to a wealthy family, Gunnar Höckert had only one great season, in 1936. The 5000 m final at the Berlin Olympics started in a good pace. The tempo was dictated by American Donald Lash, but he was overtaken by three Finns after 2,000 m. Soon the race turned into a battle between Höckert and defending Olympic Champion and world record holder Lauri Lehtinen. In the last lap Höckert overran Lehtinen to win in a world's season best time of 14:22.2. In this same race Swedish Henry Jonsson got third place over Kohei Murakoso, the Japanese runner who was leading the race at the beginning.

Later on that season, on 16 September in Stockholm, Höckert ran a new world record in 3,000 m (8:14.8). A week later, on the same track, Höckert ran a new world record in 2 miles (8:57.4) and another week later, he equalled the Jules Ladoumegue's 2,000 m world record of 5:21.8 in Malmö.

The rest of Höckert's athletics career was hampered by rheumatism, and he never again achieved the times he had run in 1936. He went to the Winter War as a volunteer, progressing to 2nd lieutenant. He was killed during the Winter War in Johannes on the Karelian Isthmus, just one day before his thirtieth birthday.

Records
Preceded by (Denmark) Henry Nielsen	Men's 3,000m World Record Holder; 16 September 1936 – 14 August 1940	Succeeded by (Sweden) Henry Kälarne
Preceded by (United States) Don Lash	Men's Two Miles World Record Holder; 24 September 1936 – 30 September 1937	Succeeded by (Hungary) Miklós Szabó
