= Ernie Page =

Ernie Page may refer to:

- Ernie Page (politician) (1935–2018), Australian politician
- Ernie Page (athlete) (1910–1973), English sprinter
