= 1932 AAA Championships =

Outdoor track and field competition

- Dates: 1–2 July 1932
- Host city: London, England
- Venue: White City Stadium
- Level: Senior
- Type: Outdoor
- Events: 24

The 1932 AAA Championships was the 1932 edition of the annual outdoor track and field competition organised by the Amateur Athletic Association (AAA). It was held from 1 to 2 July 1932 at White City Stadium in London, England.

After 19 consecutive years at Stamford Bridge the championships were held at White City Stadium for the first time. The Championships consisted of 24 events and covered two days of competition.

A new event was introduced over 6 miles. The 4 miles event was reduced in distance to 3 miles and the marathon was held from Windsor to White City.

== Results ==
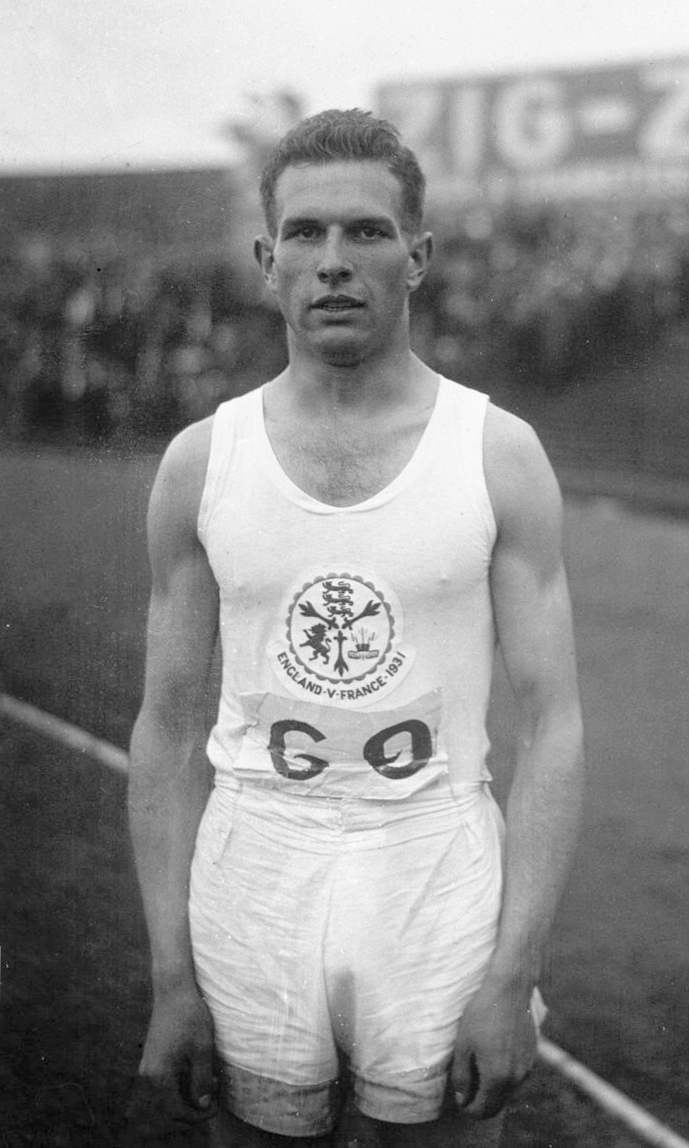
Fred Reid completed a sprint double

Event	Gold		Silver		Bronze	
100 yards	(Scotland) Fred Reid	9.9	Ernie Page	inches	Stanley Fuller	1 ft
220 yards	(Scotland) Fred Reid	22.0	Stanley Fuller	22.2	Stanley Engelhart	1 ft
440 yards	Crew Stoneley	49.8	Tommy Hampson	50.2	Thomas Parselle	50.6
880 yards	Tommy Hampson	1:56.4	Jack Powell	1:57.3	Thomas Scrimshaw	1:58.2
1 mile	Jerry Cornes	4:14.2	(New Zealand) Jack Lovelock	4:14.4	Cyril Ellis	4:15.0
3 miles	Walter Beavers	14:23.2	Alec Burns	14:31.2	Harold Forrester	14:46.0
6 miles	John Potts	30:23.2	Jack Holden	30:26.6	Arthur Furze	30:34.0
10 miles	(Scotland) James Wood	52:00.2	Alec Burns	52:05.4	Jack Holden	52:46.4
marathon	(Scotland) Donald Robertson	2:34:32.6	(Scotland) Dunky Wright	2:34:34.0	Harry Payne	2:40:30.0
steeplechase	Tom Evenson	10:13.8 NR	George Bailey	10:14.8	Jack Webster	10:33.2
120y hurdles	Don Finlay	14.9	Walter Thring	15.3	Ian Tubbs	15.5
440y hurdles	Lord Burghley	54.6	Joseph Simpson	55.4	John Stone	18 yd
2 miles walk	Bert Cooper	13:44.6	Dick Edge	130 yd	Leslie Dickinson	120 yd
7 miles walk	Alf Pope	51:25.4	Dick Edge	53:26.6	Albert Plumb	53:30.4
high jump	William Land	1.854	Edward Bradbrooke & Stanley West (shared silver)			1.829
pole vault	(Scotland) Patrick Ogilvie	3.66	Frank Phillipson	3.50	Fred Housden; Dick Webster	3.43
long jump	(South Africa) Robert Evans	7.06	(Republic of Ireland) Paddy Anglim	6.98	Stanley Edenborough	6.87
triple jump	Arthur Gray	13.82	W. H. Childs	13.49	R. E. Gifford	12.70
shot put	(South Africa) Harry Hart	14.77	Robert Howland	14.54 NR	Kenneth Pridie	13.48
discus throw	(Republic of Ireland) Paddy Bermingham	42.44	(South Africa) Harry Hart	39.46	Kenneth Pridie	38.84
hammer throw	(Republic of Ireland) George Walsh	43.16	(United States) Samuel Thomson	36.52	John Jarvis	33.85
javelin throw	(Latvia) Oto Jurģis	64.52	Stanley Wilson	56.32	Robert Turner	53.52
440 yards relay	Blackheath Harriers	43.3–5sec	Achilles Club	5 yd	South London Harriers	
Tug of war (100 st)	Marines		RASC			

== See also ==
- 1932 WAAA Championships
