= 1937 AAA Championships =

Outdoor track and field competition

- Dates: 16–17 July 1937
- Host city: London, England
- Venue: White City Stadium
- Level: Senior
- Type: Outdoor
- Events: 25

The 1937 AAA Championships was the 1937 edition of the annual outdoor track and field competition organised by the Amateur Athletic Association (AAA). It was held from 16 to 17 July 1937 at White City Stadium in London, England.

The Championships consisted of 25 events and covered two days of competition. The decathlon was held at Loughborough on 21–22 August.

== Results ==
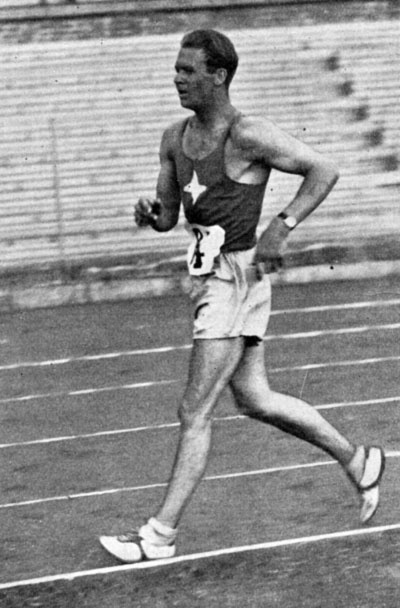
John Mikaelsson

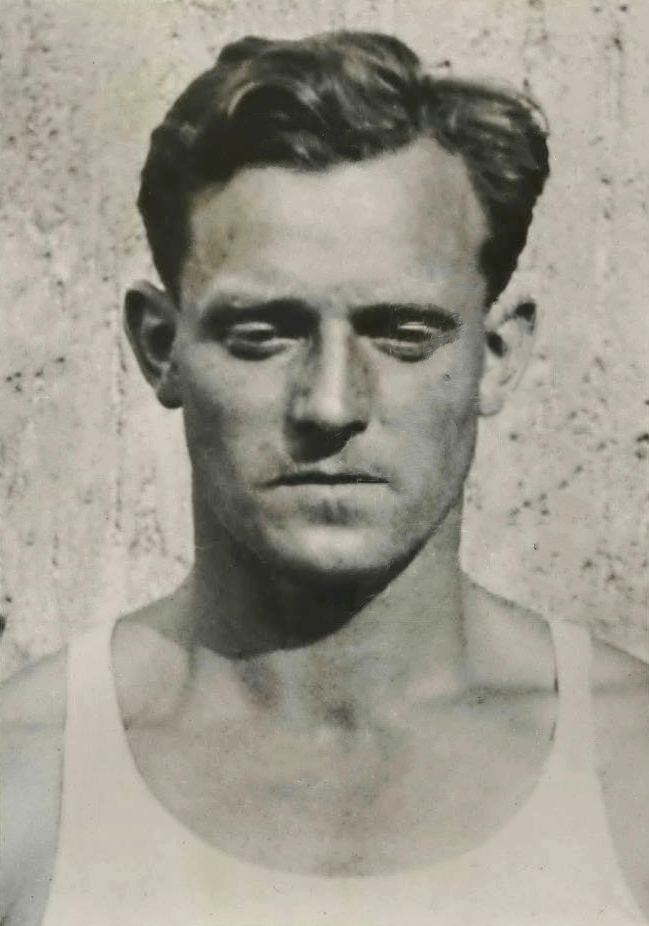
Karl Hein

Event	Gold		Silver		Bronze	
100 yards	Cyril Holmes	9.9	Arthur Sweeney	1 yd	Ernie Page	2 ft
220 yards	Arthur Sweeney	21.9	Cyril Holmes	½ yd	(Hungary) Gyula Gyenes	1 yd
440 yards	Bill Roberts	48.2	(South Africa) Ronald Wylde	49.2	(Australia) John Horsfall	49.3
880 yards	Arthur Collyer	1:53.3	Frank Handley	1:53.5	(Wales) Jim Alford	1:54.3
1 mile	Sydney Wooderson	4:12.2	Denis Pell	4:15.4	(Scotland) Bobby Graham	4:15.9
3 miles	Peter Ward	14:19.8	(Hungary) János Kelen	14:21.6	(Northern Ireland) Jack Parker	14:32.0
6 miles	(Hungary) János Kelen	30:07.8	Alec Burns	30:10.5	Lawrence Weatherill	30:38.2
10 miles	Reginald Walker	52:33.8	Alec Burns	52:37.0	Lawrence Weatherill	52:54.0
marathon	(Scotland) Donald Robertson	2:37:19.2	(Greece) Stylianos Kyriakides	2:40:10.0	Albert Norris	2:41:41.0
steeplechase	(Scotland) William Wylie	10:27.0	(Scotland) Robert Sutherland	10:28.1	Henry Clark	10:33.0
120y hurdles	Don Finlay	14.5	John Thornton	2 yd	(Netherlands) Jan Brasser	3 yd
440y hurdles	(Belgium) Juul Bosmans	55.0	(Greece) Christos Mantikas	55.6	(Republic of Ireland) Robert Wallace	2 yd
2 miles walk	Bert Cooper	13:58.2	Eddie Staker	14:24.4	Don Brown	14:33.4
7 miles walk	(Sweden) John Mikaelsson	50:19.2	Harry Churcher	51:13.0	Fred Redman	51:55.0
high jump	John Lunn Newman	1.880	Charles Walker	1.880	Arthur Gold (Republic of Ireland) Richard O'Rafferty	1.778
pole vault	John Dodd	3.68	Alfred Kinally	3.58	(Scotland) Alexander Gibson	3.58
long jump	(Germany) Luz Long	7.48	(Scotland) Sam Beattie	7.19	William Breach	7.02
triple jump	(Netherlands) Willem Peters	14.32	Bert Shillington	14.26	Jack Higginson Jr.	13.90
shot put	(Germany) Hans Wöllke	15.39	Robert Howland	13.89	A. Rosser	12.66
discus throw	(Greece) Nikolaos Syllas	49.18	(Germany) Willy Schröder	47.39	(Hungary) Jeno Kulitzy	44.12
hammer throw	(Germany) Karl Hein	55.86	(Germany) Erwin Blask	54.64	(Germany) Otto Lutz	49.36
javelin throw	Stanley Wilson	59.18 NR	(South Africa) Ralph Blakeway	57.80	Robert Turner	53.98
decathlon	Jim Miggins	4647	(Northern Ireland) James Nesbitt	4506	N. A. Hewson	4361
440 yards relay	Blackheath Harriers	42.0sec	Magyar Athletikai Club Budapest	½ yd	Vuictoria Park Harriers	7 yd
Tug of war	Royal Army Service Corps		Cranleigh & District British Legion			

== See also ==
- 1937 WAAA Championships
