= Siegers =

Siegers is a surname. Notable people with the surname include:

- Britta Siegers (born 1966), German wheelchair tennis player and swimmer
- Heather Siegers (born 1996), Dutch cricketer
- Josef Siegers (1907–?), German long-distance runner
- Silver Siegers (born 2000), Dutch cricketer
