= 1936 AAA Championships =

Outdoor track and field competition

- Dates: 10–11 July 1936
- Host city: London, England
- Venue: White City Stadium
- Level: Senior
- Type: Outdoor
- Events: 25

The 1936 AAA Championships was the 1936 edition of the annual outdoor track and field competition organised by the Amateur Athletic Association (AAA). It was held from 10 to 11 July 1936 at White City Stadium in London, England.

The Championships consisted of 25 events and covered two days of competition.

== Results ==
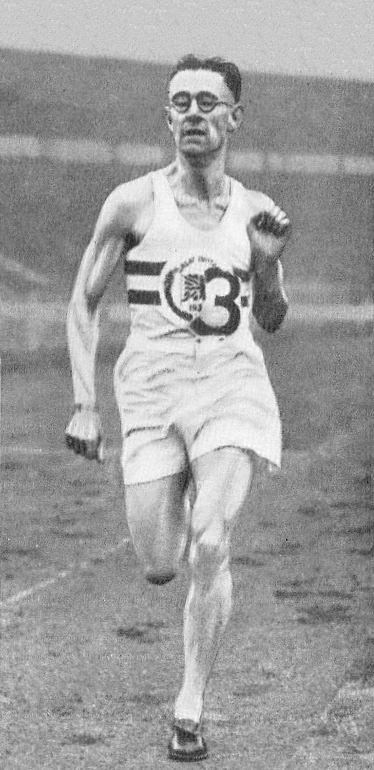
Sydney Wooderson retained his 1 mile title

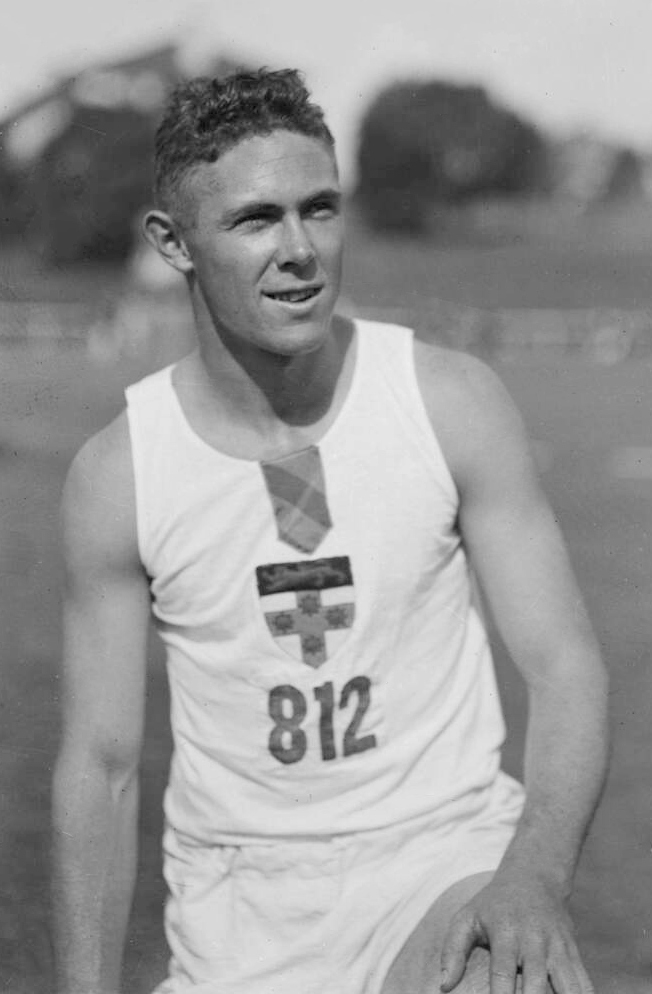
Australian Jack Metcalfe won two events

Event	Gold		Silver		Bronze	
100 yards	(Netherlands) Tinus Osendarp	9.8	Arthur Sweeney	9.8	Cyril Holmes	9.9
220 yards	Arthur Sweeney	21.9	Cyril Holmes	22.1	(Netherlands) Wil van Beveren	22.2
440 yards	Godfrey Brown	48.6	Godfrey Rampling	49.1	Bill Roberts	inches
880 yards	Jack Powell	1:54.7	Frank Handley	1:54.9	(Poland) Kazimierz Kucharski	1:54.9
1 mile	Sydney Wooderson	4:15.0	(New Zealand) Jack Lovelock	4:15.2	(Scotland) Robert Graham	4:16.5
3 miles	Peter Ward	14:15.8 NR	Frank Close	14:20.2	Aubrey Reeve	14:22.3
6 miles	(Poland) Józef Noji	29:43.4	Alec Burns	29:45.0 NR	John Potts	29:47.0
10 miles	William Eaton	50:30.8 NR	Alec Burns	51:11.8	Charles Carter	52:40.2
marathon	(Scotland) Donald Robertson	2:35:02.4	Ernest Harper	2:35:03.6	Francis O'Sullivan	2:38:17.8
steeplechase	Thomas Evenson	10:24.8	James Ginty	10:25.2	(Scotland) William Wylie	10:29.0
120y hurdles	Don Finlay	14.6	John Thornton	3 yd	Ashleigh Pilbrow	15.0
440y hurdles	John Sheffield	55.6	(Australia) Alf Watson	1-2½ yd	Ralph Kilner Brown	½ yd
2 miles walk	Bert Cooper	13:50.0	(Latvia) Paul Bernhard	14:01.4	Harry Churcher	14:02.8
7 miles walk	Vic Stone	52:21.2	Alf Pope	52:40.0	Fred Redman	53:04.4
high jump	(Australia) Jack Metcalfe	1.854	(Netherlands) Jan Brasser	1.829	Stanley West	1.778
pole vault	Dick Webster	3.88 NR	(Australia) Frederick Woodhouse	3.81	Albert Leach	3.58
long jump	George Traynor	7.07	William Breach	6.92	Sandy Duncan	6.88
triple jump	(Australia) Jack Metcalfe	15.07	(Australia) Basil Dickinson	14.62	(Northern Ireland) Edward Boyce	13.74
shot put	(Netherlands) Aad de Bruyn	14.08	Robert Howland	13.71	Alfred Carver	12.69
discus throw	(Jamaica) Bernarr Prendergast	43.10	Laurence Reavell-Carter	43.09	Douglas Bell	41.02
hammer throw	Norman Drake	46.26	(Scotland) Sandy Smith	43.38	Tom McAnallen	43.15
javelin throw	(Netherlands) Jaap van der Poll	57.66	Stanley Wilson	54.98	Robert Turner	48.72
decathlon	Ronald Walker	5291 NR	John Cotter	5129	Norman Burges	4423
440 yards relay	ATC Snelvoeters		Blackheath Harriers		Polytechnic Harriers	
Tug of war	Royal Army Service Corps Feltham		B Div Metropolitan Polices			

== See also ==
- 1936 WAAA Championships
