= Karl Becker =

Karl Becker may refer to:

- Karl Becker (painter) (1820–1900), German painter
- Karl Becker (philologist) (1775–1849), German physician and philologist
- Karl Becker (statistician) (1823–1896), German statistician
- Karl Heinrich Emil Becker (1879–1940), German engineer and officer
- Karl Friedrich Becker (1777–1806), German historian
- Karl Josef Becker (1928–2015), German Catholic theologian

== See also ==
- Karl-Heinz Becker (disambiguation)
- Carl Becker (disambiguation)
