= Umberto Cerati =

Italian long-distance runner

Personal information
- Nationality: Italian
- Born: 24 March 1911 Verona, Italy
- Died: 23 July 1994 (aged 83) Milan, Italy

Sport
- Country: Italy
- Sport: Athletics
- Event: Long-distance running
- Club: GUF Milano

Umberto Cerati (24 March 1911 – 23 July 1994) was an Italian long-distance runner who competed at the 1936 Summer Olympics.

== Biography ==
Cerati finished second behind Lauri Lehtinen in the 3 miles event at the 1933 AAA Championships.

At the 1936 Olympic Games in Berlin, Cerati competed in the 5000 metres, where he won his heat and qualified for the Olympic final.
