= Lawrence Weatherill =

British athlete

Personal information
- Nationality: British (English)
- Born: 24 July 1905 Norwich
- Died: 9 April 1984 (aged 78) Mendip District, Somerset

Sport
- Sport: Athletics
- Event: 6 miles/10 miles
- Club: South London Harriers

Lawrence Hotham Weatherill (24 July 1905 – 9 April 1984) was a male athlete who competed for England.

== Biography ==
He competed for England in the marathon at the 1934 British Empire Games in London. Four years later he competed for England at the 1938 British Empire Games in the 3 miles and 6 miles.

Weatherill finished third behind János Kelen in the 6 miles event and third behind Reginald Walker in the 10 miles race at the 1937 AAA Championships and finished second behind Jean Chapelle in the 10 miles event at the 1939 AAA Championships before his career was interrupted by World War II.
