= Stanley Fuller =

British sprinter (1907–1988)

Personal information
- Nationality: British (English)
- Born: 13 October 1907 Norwich, England
- Died: 3 January 1988 (aged 80) Great Yarmouth, England

Sport
- Sport: Sprinting
- Events: 100 metres, 200 metres, 4 x 100 meters relay
- Club: Great Yarmouth AC

Stanley Charles Fuller (13 October 1907 – 3 January 1988) was a British sprinter who competed at the 1932 Summer Olympics.

== Biography ==
Fuller finished second behind Fred Reid in the 200 yards event and third behind Reid in the 100 yards event at the 1932 AAA Championships.

He had previously been Norfolk champion in the 100 yards in 1929, 1930, 1931 & 1932; 220 yards champion in 1929, 1930 & 1931 and 440 yards champion in the 1930, 1931 & 1932 Norfolk Championships. He was the winner in the 100, 220 and 440 yards in the Norfolk/ Suffolk/ Cambridgeshire inter county contest in 1931 and participated in the AAA vs Oxford and Cambridge Universities in 1932.

Letter from Stanley Fuller explaining how he was selected for the UK 1932 Olympics Athletics team

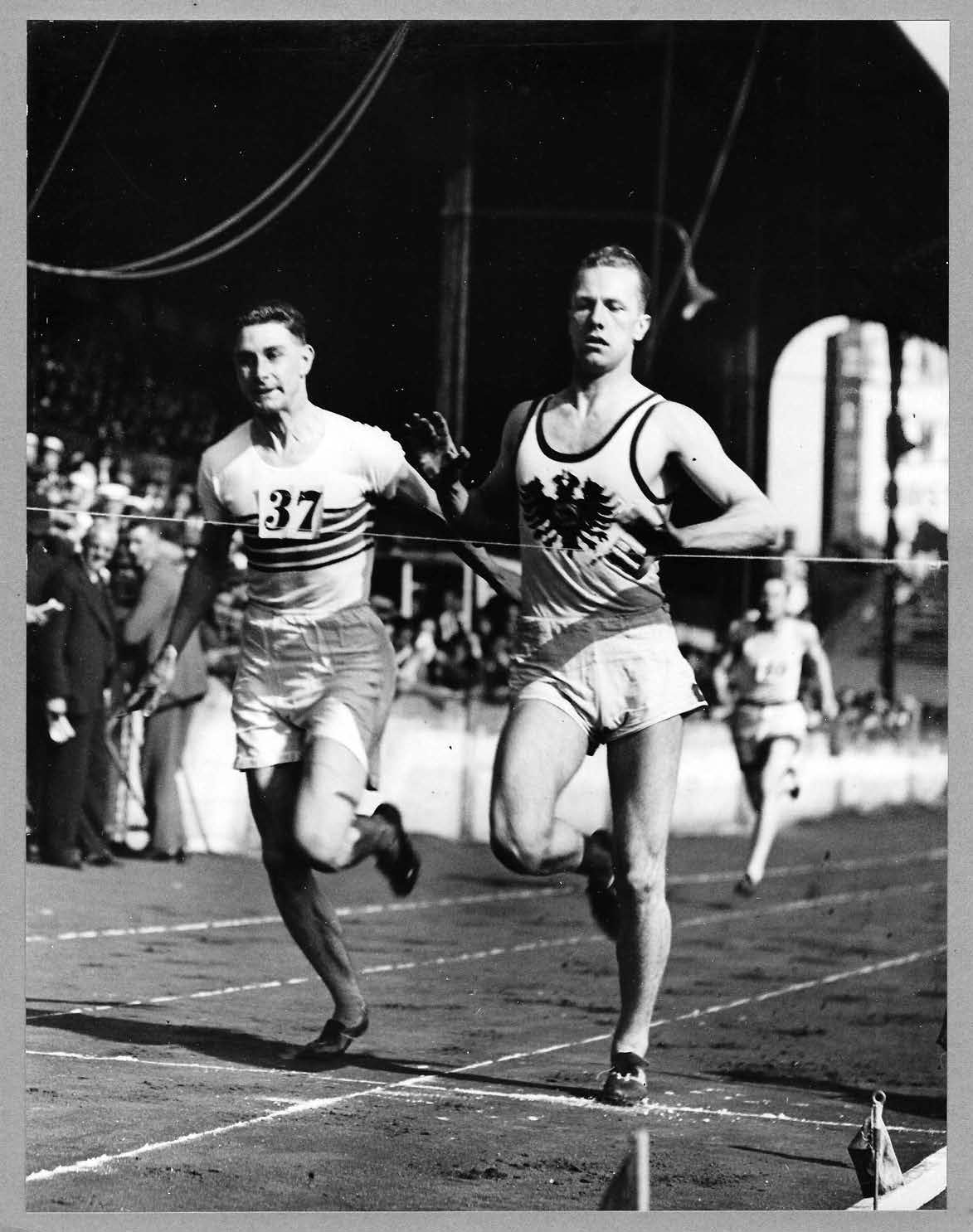
Stanley Charles Fuller (13 October 1907 – 3 January 1988), left, was a British sprinter who competed at the 1932 Summer Olympics.

Shortly afterwards Fuller was selected to represent Great Britain at the 1932 Olympic Games in Los Angeles. He competed in the men's 100 metres, 200 metres and 4×100 metres relay.

He was known as 'Flying Fuller' and was reputed to be the first Norfolk man to represent Great Britain in the modern Olympic Games.

He sustained an injury when he fell down a stairway on the ship Empress of Britain going to America for the 1932 Olympic Games and failed to show his true form in Los Angeles, eliminated in the heats of the 100 and in the second round of the 200. The ship was also taking Government participants to the 1932 Ottawa Conference including Prime Minister Stanley Baldwin.

Fuller married Mary Lord (19 April 1912 - 1997) in Leicester, Leicestershire, in April 1936 when he was 28 years old. They settled at Gorleston-on-Sea in Norfolk, where Fuller was employed at J & H Bunn Ltd, agricultural merchants, based in Great Yarmouth. He became Chairman of the company upon the death of Wallace Bunn in 1964. They had one son, Michael John Fuller (b. 05/07/1939), who joined the Bunn business in 1964 and eventually followed his father to be Chairman of the Company.

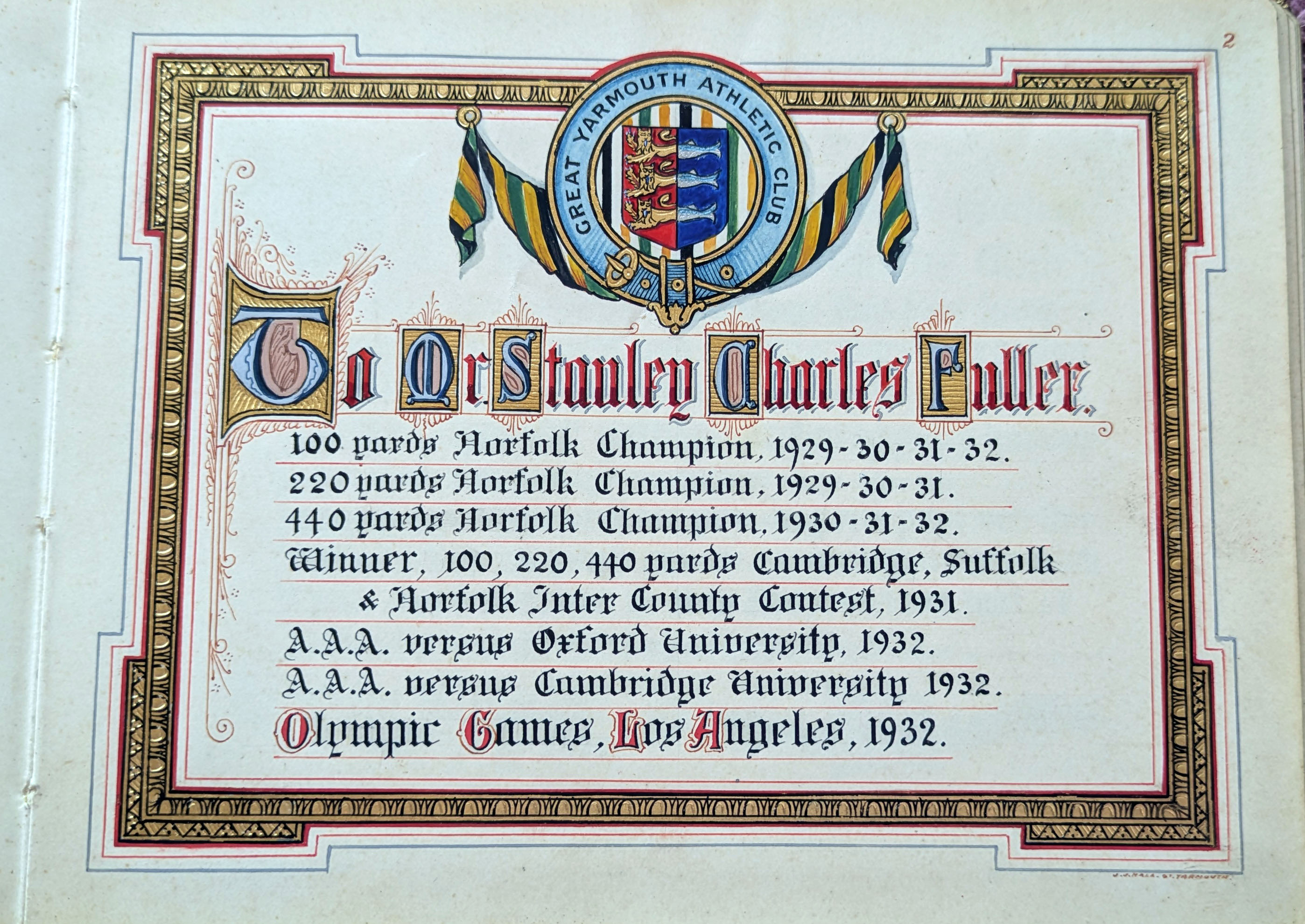
Citation from Gt Yarmouth Athletics Club to Stanley Fuller - July 1932

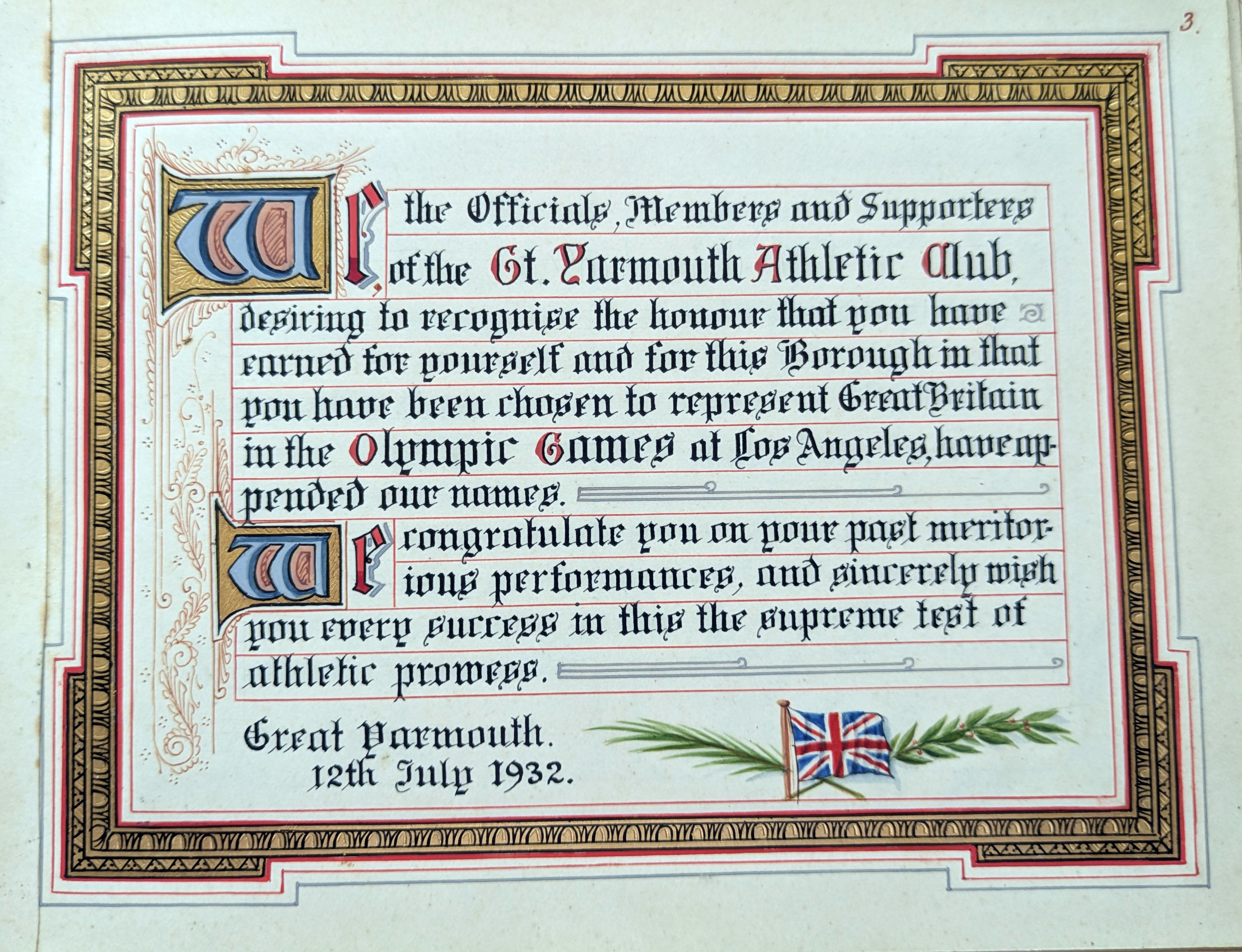
Thanks from Gt Yarmouth Athletics Club to Stanley Fuller - July 1932

His Grandson, John Charles Fuller, also served in the business before it was sold to Koch Industries in March 2011. John was enobled as Baron Fuller, OBE, of Gorleston-on-Sea in the County of Norfolk on 8 March 2024 and sits in the House of Lords as a Conservative Peer.
