= John Potts (athlete) =

British long-distance runner

Personal information
- Full name: John Henry Soulsby "Jack" Potts
- Nationality: British
- Born: 17 September 1906 Tanfield, England
- Died: 25 April 1987 (aged 80) Shurdington, Cheltenham, England
- Height: 171 cm (5 ft 7 in)
- Weight: 62 kg (137 lb)

Sport
- Sport: Long-distance running
- Event: 10,000 metres
- Club: Saltwell Harriers

John Henry Soulsby Potts also known as Jack Potts (17 September 1906 – 25 April 1987) was a British long-distance runner who competed at the 1936 Summer Olympics.

== Biography ==
Potts finished second behind Jack Winfield in the 10 miles event at the 1931 AAA Championships. Potts became the national 6 miles champion after winning the British AAA Championships title at the 1932 AAA Championships.

After finishing third behind Józef Noji in the 6 miles event at the 1936 AAA Championships, he was selected to represent Great Britain at the 1936 Olympic Games held in Berlin, where he participated in the men's 10,000 metres but did not finish.

Potts became the national steeplechase champion after winning the British AAA Championships title at the 1938 AAA Championships.
