= Heinz Becker (disambiguation) =

Heinz Becker (1915–1991) was a German-American baseball player.

Heinz Becker may also refer to:

- Heinz K. Becker (born 1950), Austrian politician
- Heinz Becker (musicologist) (1922–2006), German composer and musicologist

== See also ==
- Karl-Heinz Becker (disambiguation)
