= Aubrey Reeve =

British long-distance runner

Personal information
- Full name: Aubrey Vincent Reeve
- Nationality: British (English)
- Born: 19 September 1911 Paddington, England
- Died: 17 July 1996 (aged 84) Tooting, England
- Height: 175 cm (5 ft 9 in)
- Weight: 57 kg (126 lb)

Sport
- Sport: Long-distance running
- Event: 5000 metres
- Club: Polytechnic Harriers

Aubrey Vincent Reeve (19 September 1911 – 17 July 1996) was a British long-distance runner. He competed in the men's 5000 metres at the 1936 Summer Olympics.

== Career ==
Reeve finished third behind Reg Thomas in the 1 mile event at the 1933 AAA Championships.

At the 1935 AAA Championships, Reeve won the national 3 miles title after winning at the British AAA Championships.

After finishing third behind Peter Ward in the 3 miles event at the 1936 AAA Championships, he was selected to represent Great Britain at the 1936 Olympic Games held in Berlin.

At the Olympics, Reeve finished in fifth place in heat 1 of the 5,000 metres to qualify for the final but failed to finish in the final.
