= Pierre Bajart =

Belgian long-distance runner

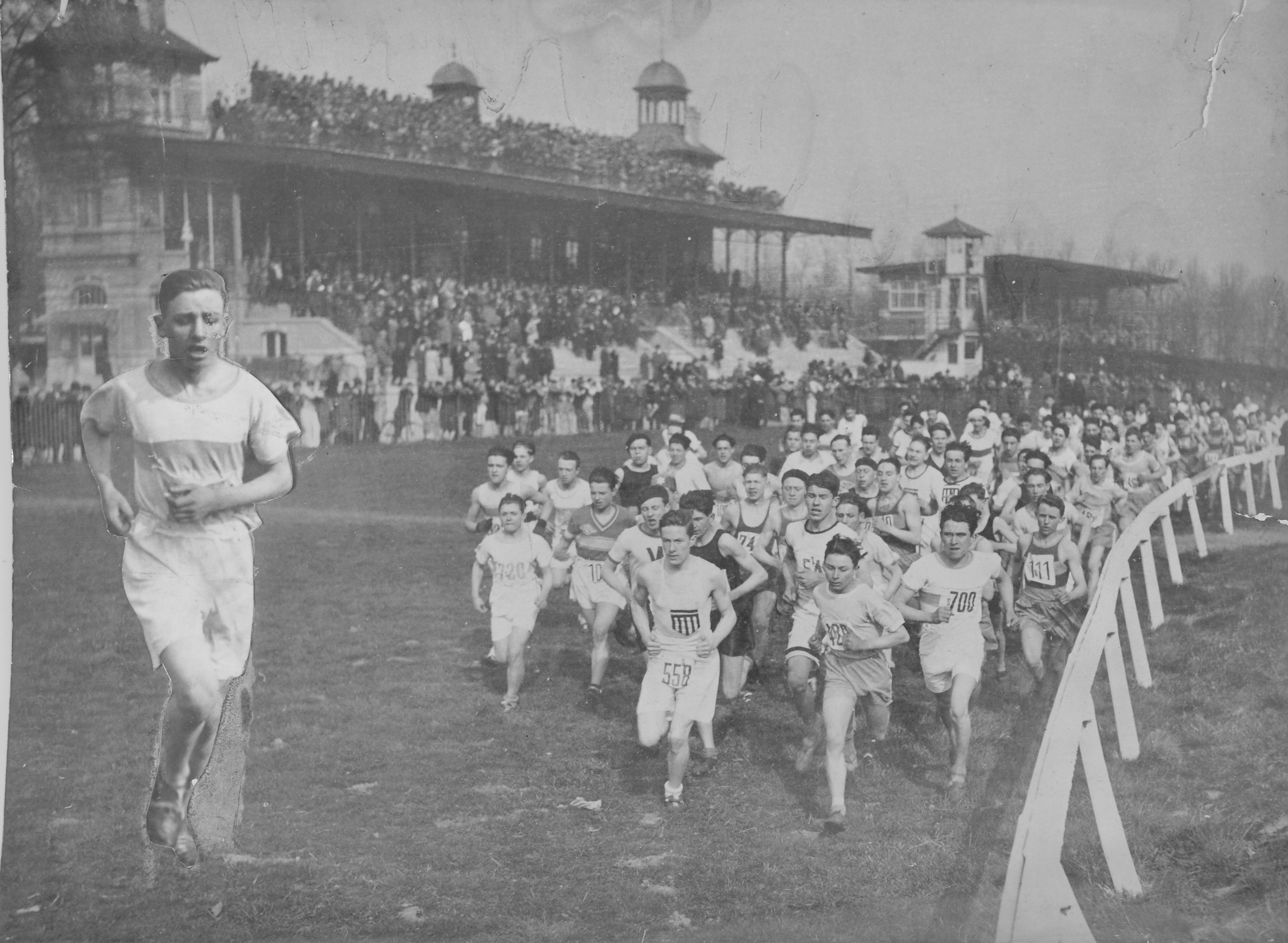
- Pierre Bajart, winner of the Belgian Championship, 9 March 1930

Personal information
- Nationality: Belgian
- Born: 9 March 1914

Sport
- Sport: Long-distance running
- Event: 10,000 metres

Pierre Bajart (born 9 March 1914, date of death unknown) was a Belgian long-distance runner. He competed in the men's 10,000 metres at the 1936 Summer Olympics.
