= Clifford Whitehead =

British athlete (1909–??)

Personal information
- Nationality: British (English)
- Born: 1909

Sport
- Sport: Athletics
- Event: middle–distance
- Club: Salford Harriers

Clifford Whitehead was an English athlete who competed for England who competed at the 1934 British Empire Games and was a British champion in the half–mile.

== Biography ==
Whitehead became the national 880 yards champion after winning the British AAA Championships title at the 1933 AAA Championships.

He competed for England in the 880 yards at the 1934 British Empire Games in London.

He represented the Salford Harriers and married Elizabeth Biss in 1940.
