= Theodore Allen =

Theodore Allen may refer to:

- Theodore Allen (saloon keeper) (c. 1833–1908), American gambler, political organizer, saloon keeper and head of a criminal family in New York City
- Theodore W. Allen (1919–2005), American intellectual, writer, and activist
- Theo Allen (1914–2003), New Zealand middle-distance runner
