= Patrick Ogilvie =

Scottish athlete

Personal information
- Nationality: British (Scottish)
- Born: 14 January 1910
- Died: 11 December 1944 (aged 34)

Sport
- Sport: Athletics
- Events: Pole vault, long jump
- Club: Glasgow University AC; Cambridge University AC; Achilles Club; Atalanta Club; Bridge of Weir AC

Patrick Bruce Bine Ogilvie (14 January 1910 – 11 December 1944) was a track and field athlete from Scotland who competed at the 1934 British Empire Games (now Commonwealth Games).

== Biography ==
Ogilvie studied at Pembroke College, Cambridge and was a doctoral researcher in botany at the University of Glasgow. He was a member of both of their athletics clubs.

In May 1932 he improved on his own Scottish pole vault record, jumping 11 feet, 11.5 inches. Additionally he broke the varsity record in the long jump. He became the British pole vault champion after winning the title at the 1932 AAA Championships.

At the 1933 Scottish AAA Championships he won the pole vault title and the following year in 1934 retained it. At the 1934 AAA Championships he finished runner-up behind Frank Phillipson.

He represented the Scottish Empire Games team at the 1934 British Empire Games in London, England, participating in one event, the pole vault.

By virtue of being a former Cambridge student and Glasgow student he was able to represent the Achilles and Atalanta Clubs respectively. He also was a member of the Bridge of Weir Athletic Club.

Ogilvie joined the Royal Air Force during World War II, rising to the rank of Group Captain. In December 1944 his Spitfire went missing over the North Sea and he was later presumed dead.
