= Russ Karpisek =

American politician (born 1966)

Member of the Nebraska Legislature from the 32nd district
- In office 2007–2015
- Preceded by: Jeanne Combs
- Succeeded by: Laura Ebke

Personal details
- Born: July 20, 1966 (age 60)
- Party: Democratic

Russ Karpisek (born July 20, 1966) is a politician from the U.S. state of Nebraska. He served in the Nebraska Legislature from 2007 to 2015.

== Early life and career ==
Karpisek was born on July 20, 1966, in Friend, Nebraska, and graduated from Wilber-Clatonia High School in 1984. In 1989, he graduated from the University of Nebraska–Lincoln, with a B.S. in business administration. After college, he returned to his hometown of Wilber, where he took over his grandmother's business, Karpisek's Meat Market. He served as mayor of Wilber from 1994 to 2006.

== Legislature ==
=== Elections ===
In 2006, Karpisek challenged incumbent Jeanne Combs for the 32nd District seat in the Nebraska legislature. The district, in the southeastern part of the state, then consisted of Fillmore, Jefferson, Saline, and Thayer counties.

In the nonpartisan primary, Combs, a Republican, won 50.1% of the vote; Democrat Karpisek won 43.3%; and George Shada, an independent and a college student from Fairbury, won 6.6%. Shada was eliminated from the race; Combs and Karpisek, as the top two vote-getters, were to move on to the general election.

Less than two weeks after the primary, Combs, a registered nurse, announced that she had been offered a significant advance in her career, with increased responsibilities that would preclude her serving as a legislator, and withdrew from the election. Combs's withdrawal would have left Karpisek's the only name on the ballot. However, Ron Schwab, a former city attorney and mayor of Fairbury, secured enough petition signatures to have his name listed as well. Schwab, a Republican and self-described "staunch fiscal conservative", stated that he was concerned about high taxes, particularly property taxes, and government spending. Karpisek expressed support for increased state aid to schools to allow reduction of local property taxes.

Karpisek won the general election, with 59% of the vote to Schwab's 41%. He won his home Saline County by a 3-1 margin, and Fillmore County by a 2-1 margin; Schwab won his home Jefferson County by a 2-1 margin and narrowly defeated Karpisek in Thayer County.

In 2010, Karpisek filed for re-election, stating that he would continue to focus on rural economic development. He ran unopposed and was elected to a second term.

In 2014, Nebraska's term-limits law prevented Karpisek's running for a third consecutive term. In the race to succeed him, he endorsed Crete veterinarian Phil Hardenburger, a Democrat and a self-described centrist, against Republican Laura Ebke, a Crete community college instructor and the president of the Nebraska chapter of the Republican Liberty Caucus, whom the Omaha World-Herald described as "conservative". Ebke won the general election with 50.7% of the vote to Hardenburger's 49.3%.

=== Legislative career ===
Karpisek served as chairperson of the Legislature's General Affairs Committee. At various times, his other committee assignments included the Executive Board; the Committee on Committees; and the Agriculture, the Government, Military, and Veterans Affairs, the Nebraska Retirement Systems, and the Urban Affairs Committees.

In every session of the Nebraska legislature, each senator is allowed to designate one priority bill, which will be considered before other bills in debate. In 2007, Karpisek prioritized LB232, a bill introduced by Annette Dubas that modified the 2005 Building Entrepreneurial Communities Act, which awarded grants to economically depressed rural communities to promote development and entrepreneurship. LB232 reduced the matching-funds requirement for communities meeting certain standards. The bill passed 40–0 and was signed by governor Dave Heineman.

In 2008, Karpisek introduced and prioritized LB844, which increased penalties for possession of marijuana. At the time, possession of quantities less than one ounce (28 g) was decriminalized, with a maximum penalty of $100; the bill reclassified simple possession from an infraction to a Class III misdemeanor, increased the penalty for a first offense to $300, and allowed sentences of up to 90 days in jail. Karpisek argued that the penalties for possession of marijuana should at least equal those for possession of alcohol by a minor. The bill passed the Legislature 40–2, and was signed into law by governor Heineman.

In 2012, Karpisek introduced and prioritized LB1067, which would allow communities to increase the frequency of keno games. Under current state law, at least five minutes had to elapse between games. Karpisek's bill would allow communities to choose a new interval, provided that it was greater than one minute. The bill was amended in committee to change the minimum interval to three minutes. In this form, it was supported by the city of Omaha and the League of Nebraska Municipalities, as a means of raising additional revenue; it was opposed by anti-gambling groups. The measure failed to secure the necessary majority in the General Affairs Committee.

In 2013, Karpisek, a divorced father of two, prioritized LB22, introduced by Kearney senator Galen Hadley, which would require divorce courts to devise custody plans in which both parents shared decision-making authority, and which maximized parenting time for both. The bill failed to clear the Judiciary Committee in 2013, which proponents attributed in part to delaying tactics by Ernie Chambers; it was carried over into the 2014 session, but again was not moved out of the committee.
