= Athletics at the 1930 British Empire Games – Men's javelin throw =

Men's javelin throw at the Commonwealth Games

The men's javelin throw event at the 1930 British Empire Games was held on 23 August at the Civic Stadium in Hamilton, Canada.

== Results ==
Rank	Name	Nationality	Result	Notes
1st place, gold medalist(s)	Stan Lay	New Zealand	207 ft 1 1/2 in (63.13 m)	
2nd place, silver medalist(s)	Doral Pilling	Canada	183 ft 6 in (55.93 m)	
3rd place, bronze medalist(s)	Harry Hart	South Africa	174 ft 7 in (53.21 m)	
4	Eric Turner	England	??.??	
5	Leslie Snow	England	??.??	
6	Archie Stewart	Canada	147 ft 2 in (44.86 m)	
