= TIF Viking =

Norwegian sports club

- Full name: Turn & Idrettsforeningen Viking
- Founded: 17 May 1892
- Ground: Skansemyren; Bergen

Turn & Idrettsforeningen Viking is a Norwegian sports club from Bergenhus, Bergen. It has sections for gymnastics, athletics, race walking, orienteering, volleyball, handball and skiing.

It was founded on 17 May 1892 as IK Viking, but later changed their name. The club had its heyday before and around World War II. Its indoor arena, Vikinghallen, was erected in 1935 and to this day generates most of the club's income. Its outdoor arena and home ground is Skansemyren. Many international athletes represented the club, including Harald Stenerud, Olaf Strand, John Systad and Odd Rasdal. In the 2000s, race walker Trond Nymark became the club's most prominent member.

Former sports include association football (between 1911 and 1919), sport rowing and sport shooting.
