= Friedrich Fischer (athlete) =

Austrian long-distance runner

Personal information
- Nationality: Austrian
- Born: 19 July 1908
- Died: 9 October 1994 (aged 86)

Sport
- Sport: Long-distance running
- Event: 5000 metres

Friedrich Fischer (19 July 1908 – 9 October 1994) was an Austrian long-distance runner. He competed in the men's 5000 metres at the 1936 Summer Olympics.
