= Carl Becker =

Carl Becker is the name of:

- Carl Fredrick Becker (1919–2013), American luthier and restorer
- Carl Heinrich Becker (1876–1933), German scholar on Islam, Prussian minister of culture and education
- Carl K. Becker (1894–1990), American doctor and missionary
- Carl L. Becker (1873–1945), American historian
- Carl Becker (general) (1895–1966), German World War II general
- Carl Becker (marine painter) (1862–1926), German marine painter
- Carl Ferdinand Becker (1804–1877), German violinist, organist and writer on music

== See also ==
- Karl Becker (disambiguation)
