= Pęckowo, Czarnków-Trzcianka County =

Pęckowo
- Village
- Location within Poland
- Coordinates: 52°50′N 16°6′E
- Country: Poland
- Voivodeship: Greater Poland
- County: Czarnków-Trzcianka
- Gmina: Drawsko

Pęckowo [pɛnt͡sˈkɔvɔ] (German: Penskow) is a village in the administrative district of Gmina Drawsko, within Czarnków-Trzcianka County, Greater Poland Voivodeship, in west-central Poland.

Polish athlete Józef Noji was born here.
