= Stanley Wudyka =

American long-distance runner

Personal information
- Full name: Stanley Joseph Wudyka
- Nationality: American
- Born: March 13, 1910 Philadelphia, Pennsylvania, U.S.
- Died: January 25, 2003 (aged 92) Atlantic City, New Jersey, U.S.

Sport
- Sport: Long-distance running
- Event: 10,000 metres

Stanley Joseph Wudyka (March 13, 1910 – January 25, 2003) was an American long-distance runner. He competed in the men's 10,000 metres at the 1936 Summer Olympics.
