= Mohamed Ahmed Abu Sobea =

Egyptian long-distance runner

Personal information
- Nationality: Egyptian
- Born: 1907

Sport
- Sport: Long-distance running
- Event: 5000 metres

Mohamed Ahmed Abu Sobea (born 1907, date of death unknown) was an Egyptian long-distance runner. He competed in the men's 5000 metres at the 1936 Summer Olympics.
