= Jeanne Combs =

American politician

Member of the Nebraska Legislature from the 32nd district
- In office 2003–2007
- Preceded by: George Coordsen
- Succeeded by: Russ Karpisek

Personal details
- Born: October 31, 1955 (age 70) Hamilton, Ohio
- Party: Republican
- Education: Miami University; Concordia University, Nebraska
- Profession: nurse

Jeanne Combs (born 1955) is a politician from the U.S. state of Nebraska. She represented the 32nd District in the Nebraska Legislature from 2003 to 2007.

Combs was born October 31, 1955, in Hamilton, Ohio and graduated from New Miami High School in 1974. She graduated from Miami University of Ohio in nursing (1976) and Concordia University, Nebraska in health care administration (2000). She worked in many different nursing occupations and is a certified occupational hearing conservationist and health nurse specialist, and has won many nursing awards.

Combs was elected in 2002 to represent the 32nd Nebraska legislative district in the Nebraska Legislature, where she served one term, ending in 2007.
