= Max Gebhardt =

German long-distance runner (1904–1993)

Personal information
- Nationality: German
- Born: 27 February 1904
- Died: 17 August 1993 (aged 89)

Sport
- Sport: Long-distance running
- Event: 10,000 metres

Max Gebhardt (27 February 1904 – 17 August 1993) was a German long-distance runner. He competed in the men's 10,000 metres at the 1936 Summer Olympics.
