= Henning Sundesson =

Swedish long-distance runner

Personal information
- Full name: Henning Leopold Sundesson
- Nationality: Swedish
- Born: 21 April 1909
- Died: 22 December 1990 (aged 81)

Sport
- Sport: Long-distance running
- Event: 10,000 metres

Henning Leopold Sundesson (21 April 1909 – 22 December 1990) was a Swedish long-distance runner. He competed in the men's 10,000 metres at the 1936 Summer Olympics.
