= Olaf Strand =

Norwegian middle-distance runner

Olaf Strand (15 January 1899 – 10 February 1997) was a Norwegian middle distance runner who specialized in the 800 metres.

At the 1928 Summer Olympics he reached the semi-final, where he finished eighth with a time of 1:59.9 minutes. He became Norwegian champion in 800 metres in 1930, and won silver medals in the 800, 400 and 1500 metres. He represented TIF Viking in Bergen.

His personal best time was 1:54.8 minutes, achieved in August 1929 in Stockholm. He died in 1997, 98 years old.
