= Hernando Navarrete =

Colombian long-distance runner

Personal information
- Nationality: Colombian
- Born: 28 April 1916

Sport
- Sport: Long-distance running
- Event: 5000 metres

Hernando Navarrete (born 28 April 1916) was a Colombian long-distance runner. He competed in the men's 5000 metres at the 1936 Summer Olympics.
