= Leslie Snow (athlete) =

English athlete

Personal information
- Nationality: British (English)
- Born: 13 December 1907 Twickenham, England
- Died: 1995 Surrey, England

Sport
- Sport: Athletics
- Event: Javelin throw
- Club: London Athletic Club

Leslie George Snow (13 December 1907 – 1995) was an English athlete who competed at the 1930 British Empire Games.

== Biography ==
Snow was born in Twickenham, England and was a member of the London Athletic Club.

Snow represented England at the 1930 British Empire Games in Hamilton, Ontario, where he competed in the javelin throw event, finishing in fifth place. He was a bank clerk at the time of the 1930 Games and lived in Horley, Surrey.

Snow was still throwing in 1939 for Dorking St Paul's.
