= Bobby Graham (athlete) =

British middle-distance runner

Personal information
- Nationality: British (Scottish)
- Born: 4 August 1909 Glasgow, Scotland
- Died: 17 April 1963 (aged 53) Carluke, Scotland
- Height: 168 cm (5 ft 6 in)
- Weight: 57 kg (126 lb)

Sport
- Sport: Middle-distance running
- Event: 1500 metres / 1 mile
- Club: Maryhill Harriers, Glasgow

Robert Graham (4 August 1909 – 17 April 1963) was a British middle-distance runner who competed at the 1936 Summer Olympics.

== Biography ==
Graham finished third behind Sydney Wooderson in the 1 mile event at the 1936 AAA Championships. One month later he was selected to represent Great Britain at the 1936 Olympic Games held in Berlin, where he competed in the men's 1500 metres.

Graham finished third behind Wooderson again in the 1 mile event at the 1937 AAA Championships.

Graham represented Scotland at the 1938 British Empire Games in the 880 yards and 1 mile event, reaching the final of the latter. At the time of the 1938 Games he was a farmer and lived at 153 Bellshill Road, Motherwell.
