= Laura Ebke =

American politician (born 1962)

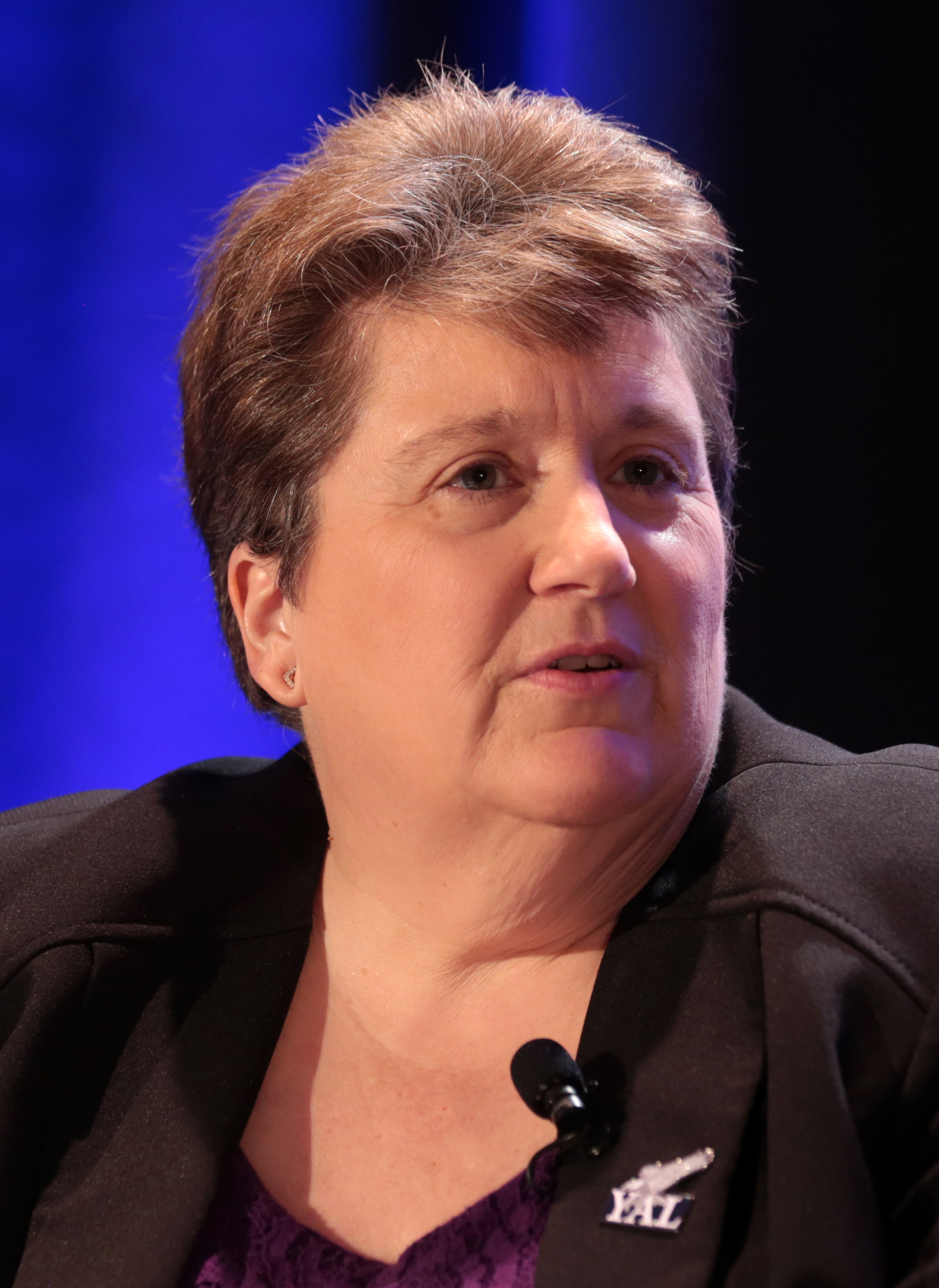
- Ebke in 2018

Member of the Nebraska Legislature from the 32nd district
- In office January 7, 2015 – January 9, 2019
- Preceded by: Russ Karpisek
- Succeeded by: Tom Brandt

At-Large Member of the Libertarian National Committee
- In office July 2020 – May 27, 2022

Personal details
- Born: Laura Lynne Schwab; June 4, 1962 (age 64) Manhattan, Kansas, U.S.
- Party: Liberal Party USA (since 2024); Libertarian (2016–2024); Republican Party (before 2016)
- Occupation: Adjunct college instructor
- Website: LauraEbke.com

Laura Lynne Schwab Ebke (née Schwab; born June 4, 1962) is an American politician from the state of Nebraska. A resident of the city of Crete in the southeastern part of the state, she served a single term in the Nebraska Legislature, from 2015 to 2019.

Originally a member of the Republican Party who described herself as "a conservative libertarian", Ebke changed her registration to the Libertarian Party in 2016; she was thought to be the first Libertarian member of the officially nonpartisan legislature. In July 2020, Ebke was elected to member-at-large of the Libertarian National Committee.

In September 2024, Laura Ebke was nominated on a presidential ticket as the 2024 United States presidential candidate of the Liberal Party USA, running alongside party chairwoman Trisha Butler, who is also their vice presidential candidate.

== Early life and career ==
Laura Lynne Schwab Ebke was born Laura Lynne Schwab on June 4, 1962, in Manhattan, Kansas. She was raised in Fairbury, Nebraska, where her family had a history of political involvement. One of her grandfathers served as the city's mayor; the other served on the city council. Her mother, Gwen Schwab (née Junker) sat on the Fairbury School Board. Her father, Ron Schwab, was also the city's mayor and, in 2006, ran unsuccessfully against Russ Karpisek for the 32nd District seat in the Nebraska Legislature.

Ebke graduated from Fairbury High School in 1980. While in college, she married Russ Ebke. Russ attended medical school in Omaha; then, after his residency, had a five-year commitment to the U.S. Navy, during which the family moved to Memphis, Tennessee, and then to North Carolina. During their stay in Tennessee, Ebke completed her bachelor's degree, and then in 1993 she earned a Master of Arts degree in political science at the University of Memphis. Russ completed his stint in the Navy in 1995, and the family moved to Crete. In 2005, Ebke received a Ph.D. in political science from the University of Nebraska–Lincoln. She subsequently taught part-time at several colleges, among them Southeast Community College.

In 2002, Ebke won election to the Crete School Board, on which she served for 12 years. In 2008, she became the chair of the newly chartered Nebraska chapter of the Republican Liberty Caucus, an organization promoting libertarian positions within the Republican Party.

== 2014 Nebraska 32nd Legislative District election ==
Crete and Fairbury both lay within the 32nd Legislative District, encompassing Fillmore, Jefferson, Saline, Thayer, and the southwestern corner of Lancaster counties. In 2014, incumbent legislator Russ Karpisek, a Democrat who had defeated Ebke's father in 2006 and then run unopposed in 2010, was ineligible to run for a third consecutive term under Nebraska's term-limits law. In June 2013, Ebke announced that she would run for the seat.

In January 2014, Crete veterinarian Phil Hardenburger announced his candidacy. Hardenburger, a registered Democrat who described himself as "more of a centrist", stated that high property taxes were among his chief concerns; he favored relieving them by revenue-increasing adjustments in the state's corporate tax and by increasing state aid to cities and counties. Ebke, too, expressed concern about property taxes, but favored keeping them in check via a lid on local tax levies. Hardenburger supported the use of human embryonic stem cells in research, and abortion in cases of rape, incest, or danger to maternal health; Ebke described herself as "unequivocally... pro-life". Hardenburger decried the Legislature's decision not to expand Medicaid under the provisions of the federal Affordable Care Act; Ebke declared herself opposed to the expansion of Medicaid.

In the nonpartisan primary election, Ebke received 4,401 votes, or 55% of the total; Hardenburger, 3,576 votes, or 45%. As the only two candidates, both moved on to the general election. Hardenburger attributed his showing in the primary to a low turnout of Democratic voters. The Democratic party hoped for a higher turnout of sympathetic voters in the general election, when a measure to increase the state's minimum wage was on the ballot; in the District 32 race, Hardenburger favored an increase while Ebke opposed it.

Over the course of the campaign, Ebke raised $76,000 and spent $74,000. Major contributions included $6,300 from the Nebraska Chamber of Commerce and Industry PAC, $5,000 from the Republican State Leadership Committee, and $2,500 from the Nebraska Realtors PAC. Hardenburger raised over $76,000 and spent all but $450 of it. Major contributions to his campaign included $25,000 from the Nebraska State Education Association PAC, $4,000 from the Lincoln chapter of the International Association of Fire Fighters, $3,500 from the Associated General Contractors Highway Improvement PAC, $3,000 from the Nebraska Association of Trial Attorneys PAC, and $3,000 from the United Transportation Union PAC. The Nebraska Bankers State PAC contributed $4,000 to Ebke's campaign and $2,200 to Hardenburger's.

In the general election, Ebke narrowly defeated Hardenburger, with 6102 votes, or 50.7% of the total, to Hardenburger's 5,941 votes, or 49.3%. Hardenburger won in Saline County, where Crete is located; but Ebke won in the other four counties that lay wholly or partly in the district.

== Legislative tenure ==
=== 2015 session ===
In the 2015 session of the Legislature, Ebke was named to the Business and Labor Committee, the Judiciary Committee, and the Urban Affairs Committee.

=== Party change ===
Following the 2016 legislative session, governor Pete Ricketts addressed a state Republican convention, criticizing several Republican state legislators for failing to support his position on various issues, and calling for the election of more "platform Republicans" to the legislature. Ebke was one of thirteen legislators who signed a letter criticizing Ricketts for conduct that they described as placing partisanship ahead of principle. Shortly thereafter, Ebke changed her registration from the Republican to the Libertarian Party. She was thought to be the first Libertarian member of the Nebraska legislature.

=== 2018 election ===
In 2017, Al Riskowski, a registered Republican and the former director of the conservative organization Nebraska Family Alliance announced that he had secured Ricketts's endorsement in a bid for the 32nd District seat in 2018.

In the primary election, Riskowski came in third with 23 percent of the vote, Ebke won 33 percent, and farmer Tom Brandt won 44 percent. Brandt and Ebke advanced to the general election.

Ebke lost her bid for re-election to Brandt, receiving 43.68% of the votes to Brandt's 56.32%, in the general election held on November 6, 2018.

2018 Nebraska Legislature election, District 32
Primary election
Candidate	Votes	%
Tom Brandt	3,514	44.45
Laura Ebke (incumbent)	2,612	33.04
Al Riskowski	1,780	22.51
Total votes	7,906	100%
General election
Tom Brandt	8,154	56.42
Laura Ebke (incumbent)	6,299	43.58
Total votes	14,453	100%

== 2024 United States presidential election ==
After joining the party earlier in the year, Laura Ebke was nominated on a presidential ticket in September 2024 by the Liberal Party USA as their 2024 United States presidential candidate, with their party chairwoman Trisha Butler also nominated as her running mate. She had ballot access in New Mexico, as well as automatic write-in status in nine states.
