= Jim Alford =

Welsh track athlete (1913–2004)

Personal information
- Nationality: British (Welsh)
- Born: 15 October 1913 England
- Died: 5 August 2004 (aged 90) England

Sport
- Sport: Athletics
- Event: middle-distance
- Club: Cardiff AAC
Medal record
Men's Athletics
Representing Wales
British Empire Games
Gold medal – first place	1938 Sydney	1 mile

James William Llewellyn Alford (15 October 1913 – 5 August 2004) was a Welsh track athlete who was born in Cardiff, Wales.

== Biography ==
Alford finished third behind Arthur Collyer in the 880 yards event at the 1937 AAA Championships.

At the 1938 Empire Games in Sydney, Australia, Alford won the gold medal in the 1 mile event, becoming the first athlete in a Welsh vest to strike gold in the Empire Games. At the time of the 1938 Games he was a teacher and lived at 17 Llandough Street, Cardiff.

At home, he won 11 Welsh titles in disciplines ranging from the 440 yards to cross country. He became first national coach for athletics in Wales in 1948 and is a member of both the Welsh Sports Hall of Fame and Welsh Athletics Hall of Fame.

As a coach, Alford guided and advised many UK athletes to represent the UK and gain honours internationally. He was known to inspire and encourage disadvantaged athletes.

He was the author and collaborator of several books and many articles, also translating many overseas books and articles into English and worked for the International Amateur Athletics Federation (IAAF) for a number of years, organising coaching forums and writing many articles.
