= Lucien Tostain =

French long-distance runner

Personal information
- Born: 10 December 1909 19th arrondissement, Paris, France
- Died: 11 January 1992 (aged 82) Cordelle, France

Sport
- Country: France
- Sport: Athletics (long-distance running)
- Event: 10,000 metres

Lucien Tostain (10 December 1909 – 11 January 1992) was a French long-distance runner. He competed in the men's 10,000 metres at the 1936 Summer Olympics.
