= Edmund Stadler =

German long-distance runner (1908–1979)

Personal information
- Nationality: German
- Born: 10 October 1908
- Died: 30 July 1979 (aged 70)

Sport
- Sport: Middle-distance and Long-distance running
- Events: 1500 metres 5000 metres

Edmund Stadler (10 October 1908 – 30 July 1979) was a German middle-distance runner and long-distance runner. He competed in the men's 5000 metres at the 1936 Summer Olympics.

As a member of the German national team he represented his country in at least 10 other international competititons between 1933 and 1938. He won the 1500 metres at the 1937 Germany–France men's athletics match, 1937 Germany–Switzerland men's athletics match and 1938 France–Germany men's athletics match.
