= Tom Brandt =

American farmer and politician (born 1959)

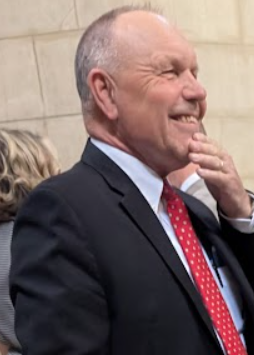

Member of the Nebraska Legislature from the 32nd district
- Incumbent
- Assumed office January 9, 2019
- Preceded by: Laura Ebke
- Succeeded by: Mark Schoenrock

Personal details
- Born: December 1, 1959 (age 66) Beatrice, Nebraska, U.S.
- Party: Republican
- Spouse: Sandra Rodriguez (m. 1988)
- Children: 2
- Education: University of Nebraska–Lincoln (BS)

Tom Brandt (born December 1, 1959) is an American politician. A Republican, he has been representing District 32 in the Nebraska Legislature since January 9, 2019.

== Personal life ==
Brandt was born in Beatrice, Nebraska. After graduating from Tri-County Middle/Senior High School in 1978, he earned a Bachelor of Science degree in agricultural economics and mechanized agriculture from the University of Nebraska–Lincoln in 1982.

Prior to entering politics, Brandt worked as an industrial engineer at Oscar Mayer, Louis Rich, and IBP. He was elected to the Nebraska Legislature in November 2018 and assumed office on January 9, 2019. Brandt was a member of the Farm Credit Services of America Advisory Council, Southeast Nebraska Corn Growers, and Board of Directors of the Farmers Cooperative Dorchester.

== Electoral history ==
Nebraska's 32nd Legislative District Election, 2022
Primary election
Party	Candidate	Votes	%
Republican	Tom Brandt (incumbent)	8,077	100.00
Total votes		8,077	100.00
General election
Republican	Tom Brandt (incumbent)	11,253	100.00
Total votes		11,253	100.00
Republican hold			

== Nebraska State Legislature ==
As of 2025, Brandt is the Chair for the Natural Resources Committee, and a member of the Transportation and Telecommunications Committee, Committee On Committees, Building Maintenance, and the Statewide Tourism And Recreational Water Access and Resource Sustainability Committee.

District 32 of Nebraska's Legislative District includes a small portion of the southwest section of Lancaster County, and the entire counties of Fillmore, Saline, Thayer, and Jefferson in the southeast Nebraska.

=== LGBTQA+ ===
Brandt is against allowing gender affirming care for minors. He is also against transgender students playing in boy/girls sports that do not match with gender assigned at birth.

=== Abortion Rights ===
Brandt is pro-life and against abortion.

=== Gun Rights ===
Brandt voted on two measures to allow Nebraskans to conceal and carry without a permit.

=== Marijuana ===
Brandt voted against the legalization of consumable hemp products like Delta-8.
