= Raymond Lefebvre (athlete) =

French long-distance runner

Personal information
- Nationality: French
- Born: 28 September 1908
- Died: 1946 (aged 37–38)

Sport
- Sport: Long-distance running
- Event: 5000 metres

Raymond Lefebvre (28 September 1908 – 1946) was a French long-distance runner. He competed in the men's 5000 metres at the 1936 Summer Olympics.
