= Doral Pilling =

Canadian javelin thrower

Personal information
- Born: Doral William Pilling; 14 January 1906 Cardston, Alberta, Canada
- Died: 24 December 1982 (aged 76) Calgary, Alberta, Canada
- Height: 180 cm (5 ft 11 in)
- Weight: 79 kg (174 lb)

Sport
- Country: Team Canada
- Sport: Track and field / Athletics
- Event: Javelin throw

Achievements and titles
- Personal best: 64.74 m (212 ft 5 in)
Medal record
Representing Canada
British Empire Games
Silver medal – second place	1930 Hamilton	Javelin throw

Doral William Pilling (14 January 1906 – 24 December 1982) was a Canadian athlete who competed in the 1928 Summer Olympics.

== Early years ==
Pilling was born in Cardston, Alberta, Canada.

== College years ==
In 1927, Pilling became the NCAA champion in the javelin throw with 199' 8", representing the University of Utah.

== 1928 Olympic Games ==
In the 1928 Summer Olympics, in Amsterdam, the Netherlands, Pilling finished twelfth in the men's javelin throw event, where he threw 59.16 m.

== International and Canadian competitions ==
After the Amsterdam Olympics Pilling attended the Tailteann Games and shattered the Irish record for the javelin thrown and won the event.

Back in Canada, he was feted and there were events for him in Vulcan and Calgary, among other places.

Pilling threw his personal best of 212 ft. 5 in. (64.74m) in Edinburgh, Scotland, United Kingdom, on August 20, 1928, shortly after the Olympics (May 17 through August 12, 1928) in Amsterdam, the Netherlands.

== 1930 British Empire Games ==
At the 1930 British Empire Games (now is known as the Commonwealth Games), Pilling won the silver medal in the javelin throw competition with a distance of 183 ft. 6 in. (55.93 m).

== 1932 Olympic Games and Tailteann Games ==
In the 1932 Summer Olympics in Los Angeles, California, Pilling "did not start" (DNS). Probably a combination of the Great Depression, the Anglo-Irish trade war and the 1932 Tailteann Games, where many Olympic athletes from Ireland or abroad could not be present, for the 1932 Summer Olympics.

== Personal life ==
Pilling was a member of the Church of Jesus Christ of Latter-Day Saints.

== Later years ==
Pilling died in Calgary, Alberta, Canada.
