= Frank Close (athlete) =

British long-distance runner

Personal information
- Nationality: British (English)
- Born: 23 April 1913 York, England
- Died: 12 February 1970 (aged 56) Banstead, England

Sport
- Sport: Long-distance running
- Event: 5000 metres
- Club: Surrey AC

Frank Close (23 April 1913 – 12 February 1970) was a British long-distance runner who competed at the 1936 Summer Olympics.

== Biography ==
Close finished second behind Peter Ward in the 3 miles event at the 1936 AAA Championships.

One month later he was selected to represent Great Britain at the 1936 Olympic Games held in Berlin, where he finished 12th in the 5000 metres event, one place behind fellow English runner Peter Ward.
