= Jenő Szilágyi =

Hungarian long-distance runner

Personal information
- Nationality: Hungarian
- Born: 22 October 1910
- Died: 24 January 1992 (aged 81)

Sport
- Sport: Long-distance running
- Event: 5000 metres

Jenő Szilágyi (22 October 1910 – 24 January 1992) was a Hungarian long-distance runner. He competed in the men's 5000 metres at the 1936 Summer Olympics.
