= Frank Phillipson =

British athlete

Personal information
- Nationality: British (English)
- Born: Cumbria, England

Sport
- Sport: Athletics
- Event: pole vault
- Club: Doncaster Plant Workd AC; H.C.A.A; Salford Harriers

Frank Phillipson was a male athlete who competed for England who competed at the 1934 British Empire Games.

== Biography ==
Phillipson finished second behind Patrick Ogilvie in the pole vault event at the 1932 AAA Championships and finished third behind Danilo Innocenti in the pole vault event at the 1933 AAA Championships.

Phillipson became the national pole vault champion after winning the British AAA Championships title at the 1934 AAA Championships. Shortly afterwards, he was then selected to compete for England in the pole vault at the 1934 British Empire Games in London.

Phillipson represented Salford Harriers and the Doncaster Plant Works AC.
