= Michel Medinger Sr. =

Luxembourgish long-distance runner (1909–1992)

Personal information
- Nationality: Luxembourgish
- Born: 17 January 1909
- Died: 15 August 1992 (aged 83)

Sport
- Sport: Long-distance running
- Event: 5000 metres

Michel Medinger Sr. (17 January 1909 – 15 August 1992) was a Luxembourgish long-distance runner. He competed in the men's 5000 metres at the 1936 Summer Olympics. His son, Michel, competed at the 1964 Summer Olympics.
