= Karl-Heinz Becker =

Karl-Heinz Becker may refer to:

- Karl-Heinz Becker (athlete) (1912–2001), German long-distance runner
- Karl-Heinz Becker (pilot) (1918–2006), German Luftwaffe flying ace
- Karl-Heinz Becker (1900–1968), German priest
- Karl-Heinz Becker (1929–2019), German politician
- Karl-Heinz Becker (* 1935), German physicist
- Karl-Heinz Becker (* 1943), German footballer
- Karl-Heinz Becker (1944–2025), German automobil racer
- Karl-Heinz Becker (* 1947), Austrian artist
- Karl-Heinz Becker (1953/54–2014), German musik festival promoter
