= Raunaq Singh Gill =

Indian long-distance runner

Personal information
- Nationality: Indian
- Born: 20 February 1910

Sport
- Sport: Long-distance running
- Event: 5000 metres

Raunaq Singh Gill (born 20 February 1910, date of death unknown) was an Indian long-distance runner. He competed in the men's 5000 metres at the 1936 Summer Olympics.
