= Bernard Eeles =

British athlete

Personal information
- Nationality: British (English)
- Born: Q3. 1913 Edmonton, London, England

Sport
- Sport: Athletics
- Event: middle-distance
- Club: Southgate Harriers

Bernard Cyril Eeles (Q3.1913 – date of death unknown) was an athlete who competed for England at the 1938 British Empire Games.

== Biography ==
Eeles finished third behind Sydney Wooderson in the 1 mile event at the 1935 AAA Championships.

Eeles represented England in the 880 yards and 1 mile at the 1938 British Empire Games in Sydney, New South Wales, Australia. At the time of the Games Eeles was an accountant by trade and lived in Cecil Avenue, in Enfield, London.
