= Gottfried Utiger =

Swiss long-distance runner

Personal information
- Nationality: Swiss
- Born: 28 March 1912
- Died: 1989 (aged 76) Bern, Switzerland

Sport
- Sport: Long-distance running
- Event: 5000 metres

Gottfried Utiger (28 March 1912 – 1989) was a Swiss long-distance runner. He competed in the men's 5000 metres at the 1936 Summer Olympics.
