= Bill Pullar (athlete) =

New Zealand athlete

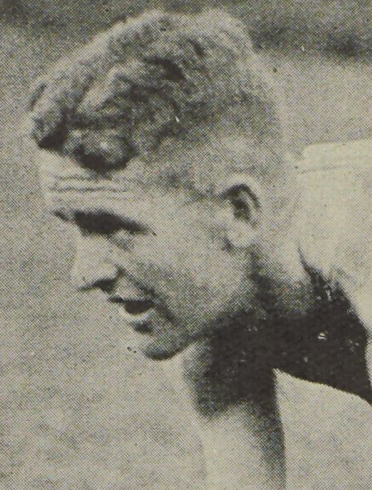
- Pullar in 1937

Personal information
- Born: William Alexander Clydesdale Pullar; 19 December 1913 Invercargill, New Zealand
- Died: 1 January 1990 (aged 76) Hamilton, New Zealand
- Spouse: Beryl Joy Kingsland (m. 1937; died 1986)

Sport
- Country: New Zealand
- Sport: Athletics

Achievements and titles
- National finals: 1 mile champion (1937, 1939, 1940); 3 miles champion (1939); 440 yd hurdles (1934); Cross-country champion (1934)

William Alexander Clydesdale Pullar (19 December 1913 – 1 January 1990) was a New Zealand track and field athlete who represented his country at the 1938 British Empire Games.

== Early life and family ==
Born in Invercargill on 19 December 1913, Pullar was the son of William Pullar and Agnes Christina Pullar (née Donovan). He was educated at Otago Boys' High School. On 10 June 1937 he married Beryl Joy Kingsland.

== Athletics ==
As well as winning the 1934 New Zealand men's cross-country championship, Pullar won a further five national titles on the track. In 1934, he won the 440 yards hurdles title with a time of 56.4 seconds, equalling the national record at the time. Going on to concentrate on middle-distance events, he won the one-mile national title in 1937, 1939, and 1940, and the three-mile championship in 1939.

At the 1938 British Empire Games in Sydney, Pullar finished sixth in the men's mile.

From 1946, Pullar was associated with the Hamilton Athletics Club, where he coached athletes including Maurice Marshall and Dutch Holland. The Hamilton City Hawks (an amalgamation of the Hamilton Athletics Club and the Hamilton Harriers Club) awards the W.A.C. Pullar Trophy to the club's top 400 m hurdler.

== Military service ==
During World War II, Pullar served with the Royal New Zealand Air Force (RNZAF), in the General Duties Branch and then the Administrative and Special Duties Branch. He was promoted from pilot officer to temporary flying officer in January 1944, and received his wings in a ceremony at Wigram later that month.

Pullar remained in the RNZAF for some time after the war, and was the senior air traffic controller at Rukuhia aerodrome, near Hamilton.

== Later life and death ==
Pullar became a farmer. He died on 1 January 1990, and his body was cremated at Hamilton Park Crematorium.
