= John Stone (athlete) =

British athlete

Personal information
- Nationality: British (English)
- Born: 7 July 1909 Brentford, England
- Died: 14 November 1955 (aged 46) Southampton, England

Sport
- Sport: Athletics
- Event: Hurdles
- Club: South London Harriers

John William Oscar Stone (7 July 1909 – 14 November 1955) was a male athlete who competed for England.

== Biography ==
Stone finished third behind Lord Burghley in the 440 yards hurdles event at the 1932 AAA Championships and finished third behind Luigi Facelli at the 1933 AAA Championships.

Stone competed for England in the 440 yards hurdles at the 1934 British Empire Games in London.
