= István Simon (athlete) =

Hungarian long-distance runner

Personal information
- Nationality: Hungarian
- Born: 8 December 1912
- Died: 14 March 1997 (aged 84)

Sport
- Sport: Long-distance running
- Event: 5000 metres

István Simon (8 December 1912 – 14 March 1997) was a Hungarian long-distance runner. He competed in the men's 5000 metres at the 1936 Summer Olympics.
