= Walter Schönrock =

German long-distance runner (1912–1996)

Personal information
- Nationality: German
- Born: 10 April 1912
- Died: 19 March 1996 (aged 83)

Sport
- Sport: Long-distance running
- Event: 10,000 metres

Walter Schönrock (10 April 1912 – 19 March 1996) was a German long-distance runner. He competed in the men's 10,000 metres at the 1936 Summer Olympics.
