= Bror Hellström =

Swedish runner

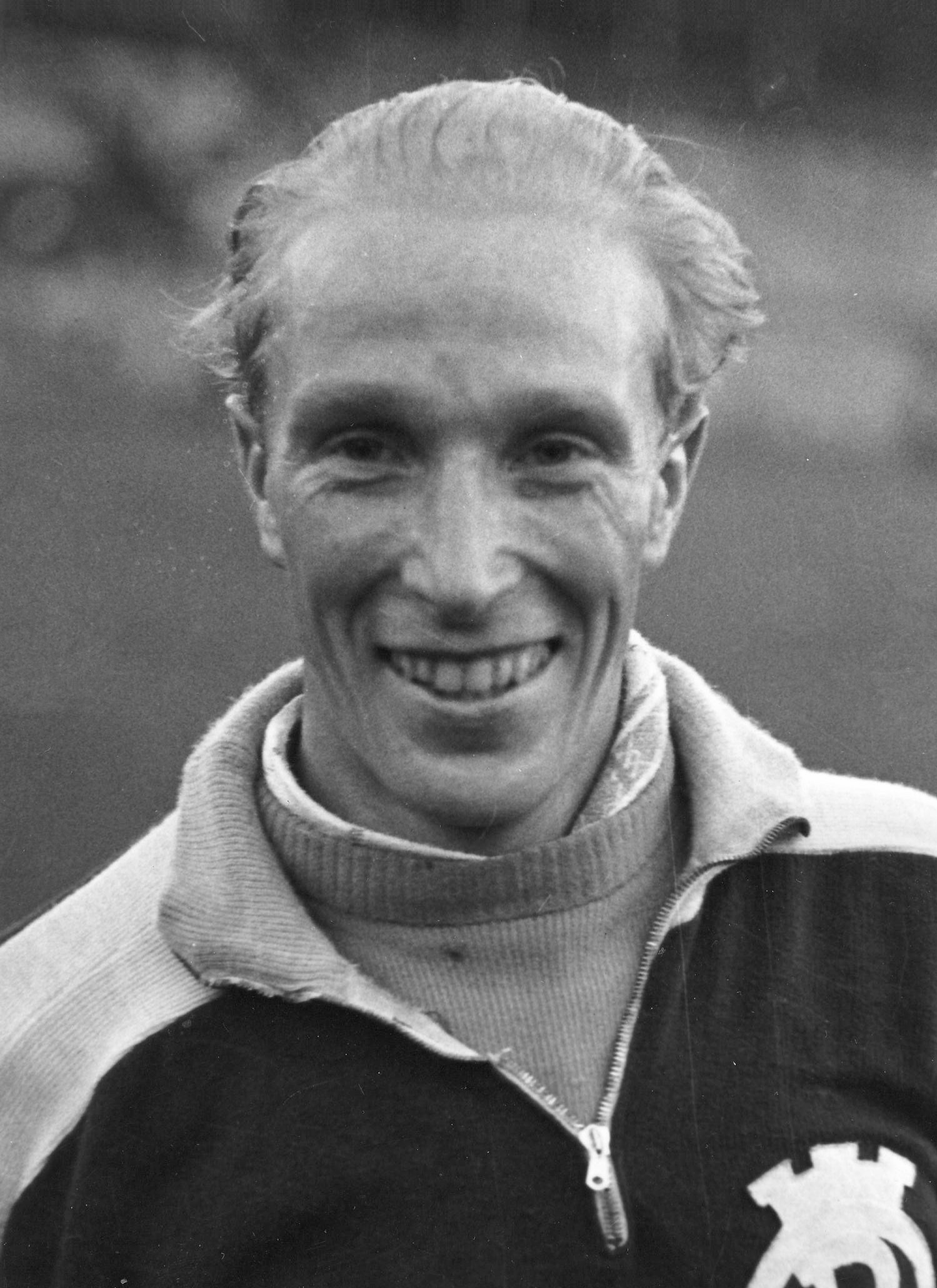

Personal information
- Born: 26 November 1914 Stockholm, Sweden
- Died: 3 August 1992 (aged 77) Stockholm, Sweden
- Height: 1.73 m (5 ft 8 in)
- Weight: 60 kg (130 lb)

Sport
- Sport: Athletics
- Event: 1500-10000 m
- Club: SoIK Hellas

Achievements and titles
- Personal best(s): 1500 m – 3:51.0 (1941); 5000 m – 14:15.8 (1941); 10000 m – 30:41.2 (1940)

Bror Joel Hellström (26 November 1914 – 3 August 1992) was a Swedish runner. He competed at the 1936 Summer Olympics in the 5000 m event and finished 14th. In 1941 he won the national title and set a national record over this distance.
