= Michel Medinger =

Luxembourgish middle-distance runner (1941–2025)

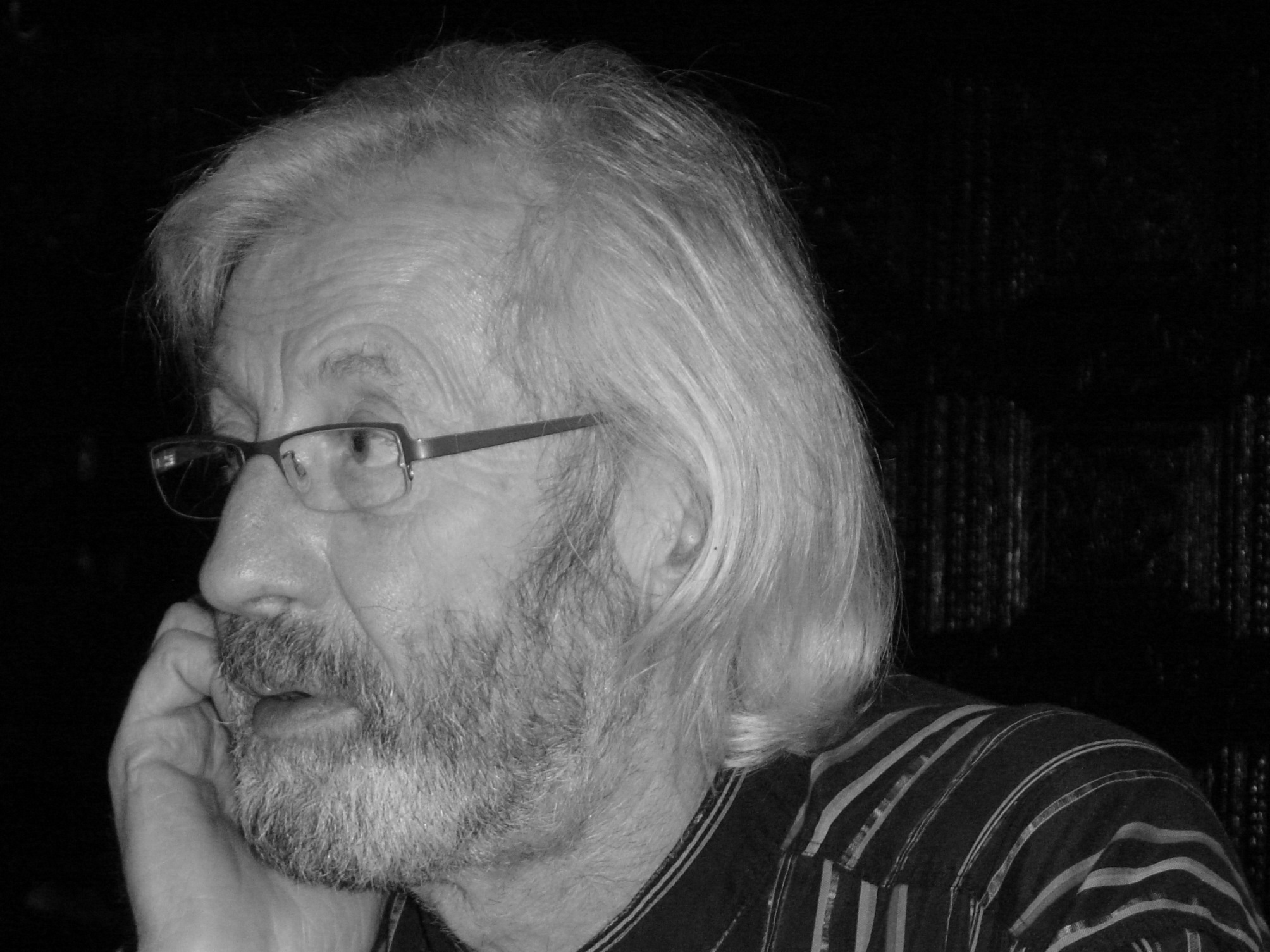
- Medinger in 2010

Personal information
- Born: 18 April 1941
- Died: 14 January 2025 (aged 83) Luxembourg

Sport
- Sport: Middle-distance running
- Event: 800 metres

Michel Medinger (18 April 1941 – 14 January 2025) was a Luxembourgish middle-distance runner. He competed in the men's 800 metres at the 1964 Summer Olympics.

Medinger died on 14 January 2025, at the age of 83. His father, Michel, competed at the 1936 Summer Olympics.
