= Ronald Wylde =

Scottish athlete

Personal information
- Nationality: Scottish South African
- Born: 7 January 1913 South Africa
- Died: 8 July 2000 (aged 87)

Sport
- Sport: Athletics
- Event: 400m
- Club: Edinburgh UAC
Medal record
Men's Athletics
Representing Scotland
British Empire Games
Bronze medal – third place	1934 London	4×440 yards

Ronald Burns Wylde (7 January 1913 – 8 July 2000) was a South African-born Scottish athlete who competed in the 1934 British Empire Games.

== Biography ==
He was also a medical doctor who practised in Grahamstown. South Africa. He attended St. Andrew's College, Grahamstown, and studied medicine at the University of Edinburgh.

At the 1934 Empire Games, he was a member of the Scottish relay team that won the bronze medal in the 4×440 yards event. In the 440 yards competition, he was eliminated in the heats.

Wylde finished second behind Bill Roberts in the 440 yards event at the 1937 AAA Championships.
