= Karl-Heinz Becker (athlete) =

German long-distance runner (1912–2001)

Personal information
- Nationality: German
- Born: 19 June 1912
- Died: 19 July 2001 (aged 89)

Sport
- Sport: Long-distance running
- Event: 5000 metres

Karl-Heinz Becker (19 June 1912 – 19 July 2001) was a German long-distance runner. He competed in the men's 5000 metres at the 1936 Summer Olympics.
