= Lauri Lehtinen =

Finnish long-distance runner

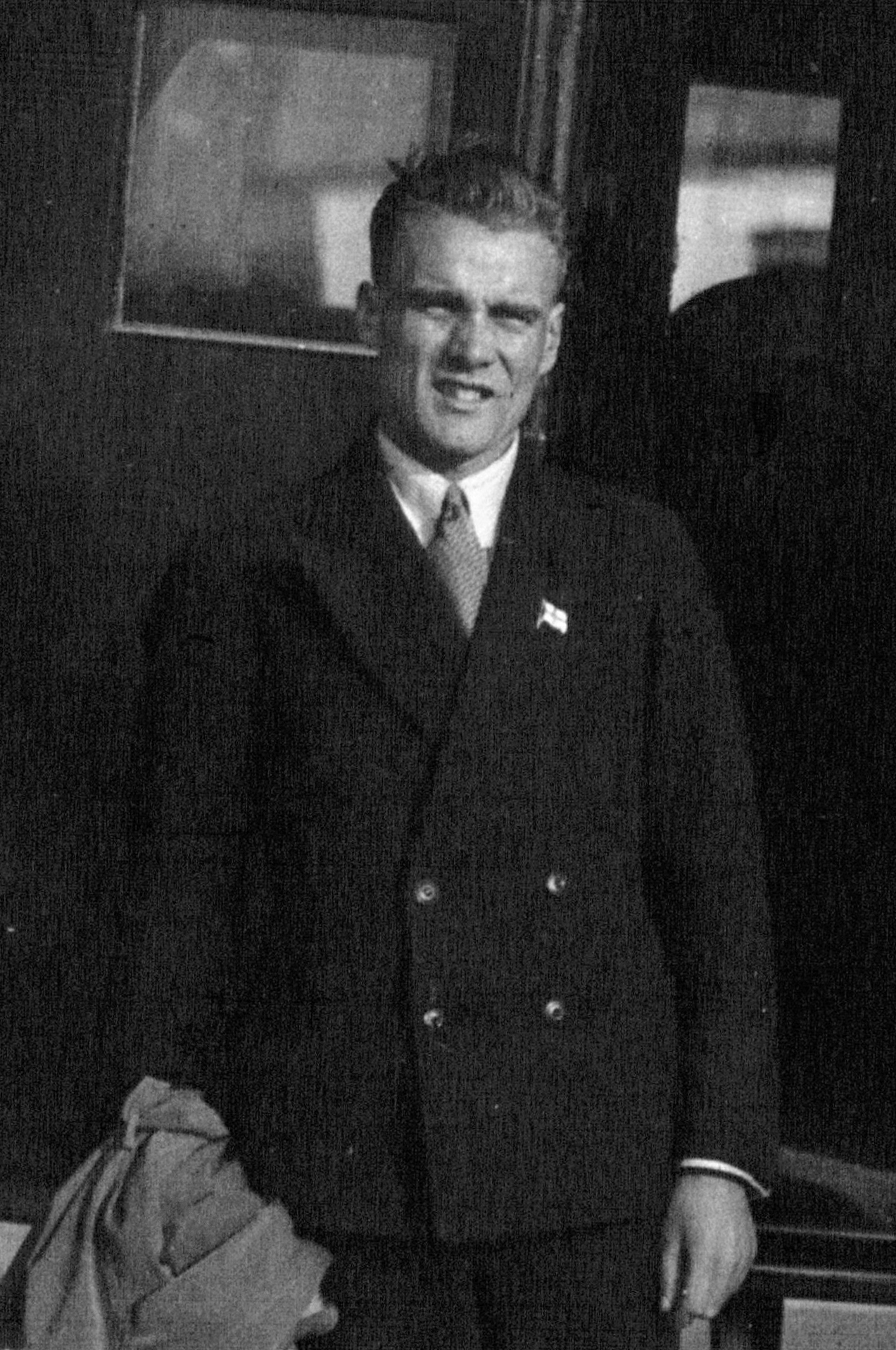
- Lauri Lehtinen in 1931

Personal information
- Born: 10 August 1908 Kerkkoo, Porvoo, Finland
- Died: 4 December 1973 (aged 65) Helsinki, Finland
- Height: 1.74 m (5 ft 9 in)
- Weight: 64 kg (141 lb)

Sport
- Sport: Athletics
- Event: 1500–10000 m
- Club: HT, Helsinki

Achievements and titles
- Personal bests: 1500 m – 3:55.5 (1931); 5000 m – 14:16.9 (1932); 10000 m – 30:15.0 (1937)
Medal record
Representing Finland
Olympic Games
Gold medal – first place	1932 Los Angeles	5000 m
Silver medal – second place	1936 Berlin	5000 m

Lauri Aleksanteri Lehtinen (10 August 1908 – 4 December 1973) was a Finnish long-distance runner and the winner of a controversial 5000 m race at the 1932 Summer Olympics in Los Angeles.

Lehtinen set a new world record in the 5000 m (14:17.0) just a month before the Olympics, making him a leading favourite for the Olympic 5000 m title. In the final, Lehtinen and fellow Finn Lauri Virtanen led the race early, eventually distancing themselves from all competitors except Ralph Hill of the United States. The race soon became a duel between Lehtinen and Hill. On the last lap, Hill attempted to overtake Lehtinen, who blocked him by zig-zagging across lanes—a common tactic in Europe but unfamiliar to the American audience, who responded with boos. Lehtinen narrowly won by 50 centimetres, with both runners recording identical times of 14:30.0. Hill declined to protest the result. This remains the only Olympic race longer than 200 meters where the top two finishers recorded identical times.

Lehtinen won the British AAA Championships title in the 3-mile event at the 1933 AAA Championships.

At the 1936 Summer Olympics, Lehtinen attempted to defend his title but finished second to fellow Finn Gunnar Höckert.

In 1940, Lehtinen donated his Los Angeles gold medal to a soldier who had served with distinction on the Karelian Isthmus. This gesture honoured Höckert, who was killed in action on the Isthmus.

In the village of Kerkkoo in Porvoo, a road is named in his honour: "Lauri Lehtisen Tie."

Records
Preceded by (Finland) Paavo Nurmi	Men's 5000 m World Record Holder; 19 June 1932 – 16 June 1939	Succeeded by (Finland) Taisto Mäki
