= Ernie Page (athlete) =

English sprinter

Personal information
- Nationality: British (English)
- Born: 27 September 1910 Lambeth, London, England
- Died: 9 December 1973 (aged 63) Torquay, England

Sport
- Sport: Athletics
- Event: Sprints
- Club: Blackheath Harriers
Medal record
Men's sthletics
Representing England
British Empire Games
Silver medal – second place	1930 Hamilton	100 yards
Representing Great Britain
European Championships
Bronze medal – third place	1938 Paris	4×100 m

Ernest Leslie Page (27 September 1910 – 9 December 1973) was an English athlete who competed for Great Britain in the 1932 Summer Olympics.

== Biography ==
He was born in Lambeth, London.

At the 1930 British Empire Games in Canada, he won the silver medal in the 100 yards contest. The following year, Page became the national 100 yards champion after winning the British AAA Championships title at the 1931 AAA Championships. Page then finished second behind Fred Reid in the 100 yards event at the 1932 AAA Championships.

Shortly afterwards Page was selected to represent Great Britain at the 1932 Olympic Games in Los Angeles, where he was eliminated in the quarter-finals of the 100 metres event. He was also a member of the British relay team which finished sixth in the 4×100 metres competition.

Page continued competing at the highest level, finishing third behind Cyril Holmes in the 100 yards event at the 1937 AAA Championships and winning a bronze medal at the 1938 European Championships in Paris.

He died in Torquay.

== Competition record ==
Year	Competition	Venue	Position	Event	Notes
Representing England
1930	British Empire Games	Hamilton, Canada	2nd	100 y	10.2
