= Harry Siefert =

Danish long-distance runner

Personal information
- Full name: Harry Johan Carl Siefert
- Nationality: Danish
- Born: 3 October 1910
- Died: 10 October 1965 (aged 55)

Sport
- Sport: Long-distance running
- Event: 5000 metres

Harry Johan Carl Siefert (3 October 1910 – 10 October 1965) was a Danish long-distance runner. He competed in the men's 5000 metres at the 1936 Summer Olympics.
