= Mark Schoenrock =

American politician

Member-elect of the Nebraska Legislature from the 32nd district
- Assuming office January 6, 2027
- Succeeding: Tom Brandt

Personal details
- Party: Republican
- Website: Campaign website

Mark Schoenrock is an American politician from the Nebraska Republican Party who is the senator-elect for the 32nd district in the Nebraska Legislature. He was elected in the 2026 general election. He is a Jefferson County Commissioner. He is a survivor of the September 11 attacks, as he was working inside The Pentagon when hijackers flew American Airlines Flight 77 into the building.
