= Alfred Kinally =

British athlete

Personal information
- Nationality: British (English)
- Born: 28 September 1908 Norwich
- Died: 26 October 1986 (aged 78) Hove, East Sussex

Sport
- Sport: Athletics
- Event: pole vault
- Club: 2nd Batt. R.T.C

Alfred Walter Kinally (1908-1986) was a male athlete who competed for England at the 1934 British Empire Games.

== Biography ==
Kinally competed in the pole vault at the 1934 British Empire Games in London.

Kinally finished second behind John Dodd in the pole vault event at the 1937 AAA Championships. At the time of the 1937 Championships he was serving with the 2nd Battalion Royal Tank Corps.
