= Josef Siegers =

German long-distance runner

Personal information
- Nationality: German
- Born: 15 October 1907

Sport
- Sport: Long-distance running
- Event: 10,000 metres

Josef Siegers (born 15 October 1907, date of death unknown) was a German long-distance runner. He competed in the men's 10,000 metres at the 1936 Summer Olympics.
