= János Kelen =

Hungarian long-distance runner

Personal information
- Nationality: Hungarian
- Born: 11 February 1911 Budapest, Hungary
- Died: 11 February 1991 (aged 80) Budapest, Hungary
- Height: 168 cm (5 ft 6 in)
- Weight: 58 kg (128 lb)

Sport
- Sport: Long-distance running
- Event: 5000 metres
- Club: BBTE, Budapest

János Kelen (11 February 1911 – 13 October 1991) was a Hungarian long-distance runner who competed at the 1936 Summer Olympics.

== Biography ==
Kelen finished second behind Jack Holden in the 6 miles event at the 1935 AAA Championships.

At the 1936 Olympic Games in Berlin, he competed in the men's 5000 metres.

Kelen won the 6 miles race and finished second behind Peter Ward in the 3 miles race at the British 1937 AAA Championships.
