= Fred Reid (athlete) =

British sprinter

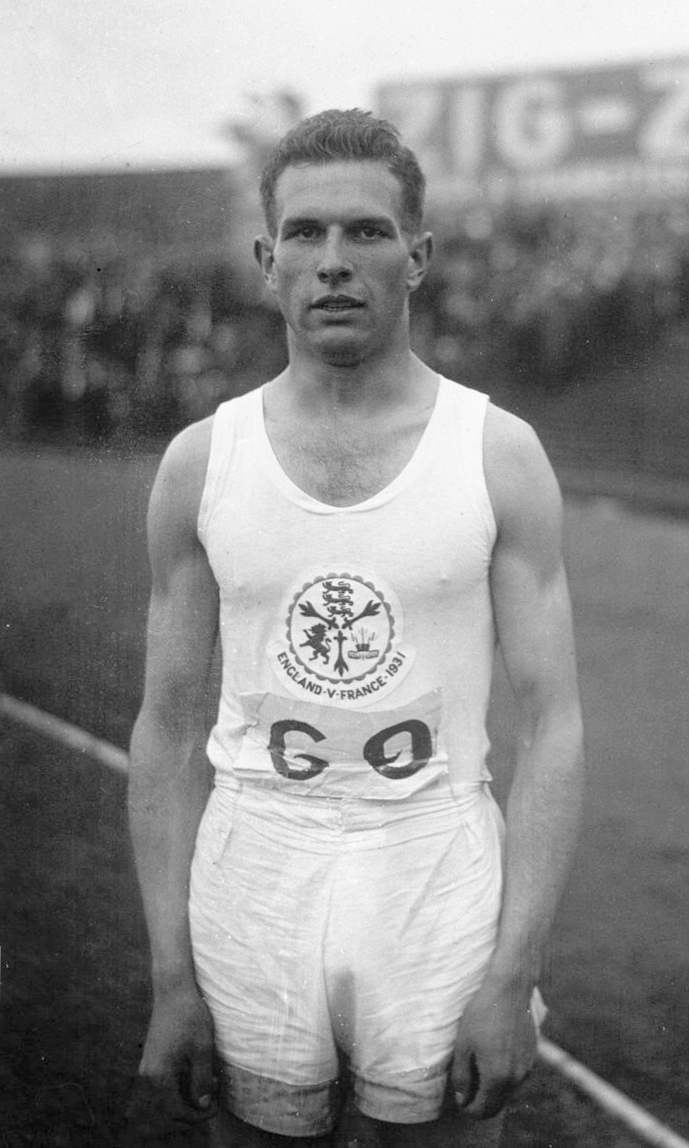
- Fred Reid in 1931

Personal information
- Born: 29 June 1909 West Bay, Dorset, England
- Died: 26 June 1991 (aged 81) Johannesburg, South Africa
- Education: University of Edinburgh

Sport
- Sport: Athletics
- Events: 100 m, 200 m
- Club: Edinburgh University Sports Union

Frederick Payne Reid (29 June 1909 – 26 June 1991) was a British sprinter who competed in the 100 m event at the 1932 Summer Olympics.

== Biography ==
Reid was born in England, but raised in Southern Africa, where his father worked as a school inspector in Basutoland (now Lesotho). He then studied medicine at the University of Edinburgh and won several Scottish AAA sprint titles in 1930–1933.

Reid finished second behind Ernie Page in the 100 yards event at the 1931 AAA Championships. Reid then became the national 100 yards champion and the national 220 yards champion after winning the British AAA Championships title at the 1932 AAA Championships.

Shortly afterwards Reid was selected to represent Great Britain at the 1932 Olympic Games in Los Angeles but pulled a muscle after starting his 100 m heat, and had to abandon the race. After graduating from University, Reid worked as a doctor in Johannesburg. He resumed competing in the 1970s, representing Rhodesia, and won the 100 m title in the 70–74 age group in a time of 13.80.
