= Odd Rasdal =

Norwegian long-distance runner

Odd Rasdal (6 July 1911 – 4 March 1985) was a Norwegian long-distance runner who specialized in the 10,000 metres.

At the 1936 Summer Olympics he finished ninth in the 10,000 m final in 31:40.4 minutes. He again finished ninth at the 1938 European Championships. He became Norwegian champion in both 5000 and 10,000 metres in the years 1937–1939, and in cross-country running in the years 1935–1939. He represented TIF Viking in Bergen. The Norwegian championships were not held from 1940 to 1945 due to World War II.

His personal best time over 10,000 metres was 31:02.4 minutes, achieved in September 1939 in Oslo. He held Norwegian records in 10,000 as well as 5000 and 3000 metres.

After retiring he continued as an athletics administrator. He was a deputy board member of the Norwegian Athletics Association from 1951 through 1952 and a board member from 1953 through 1954. He was given the King's Medal of Merit in 1971. He died in 1985.
