= Henry Jonsson =

Swedish runner

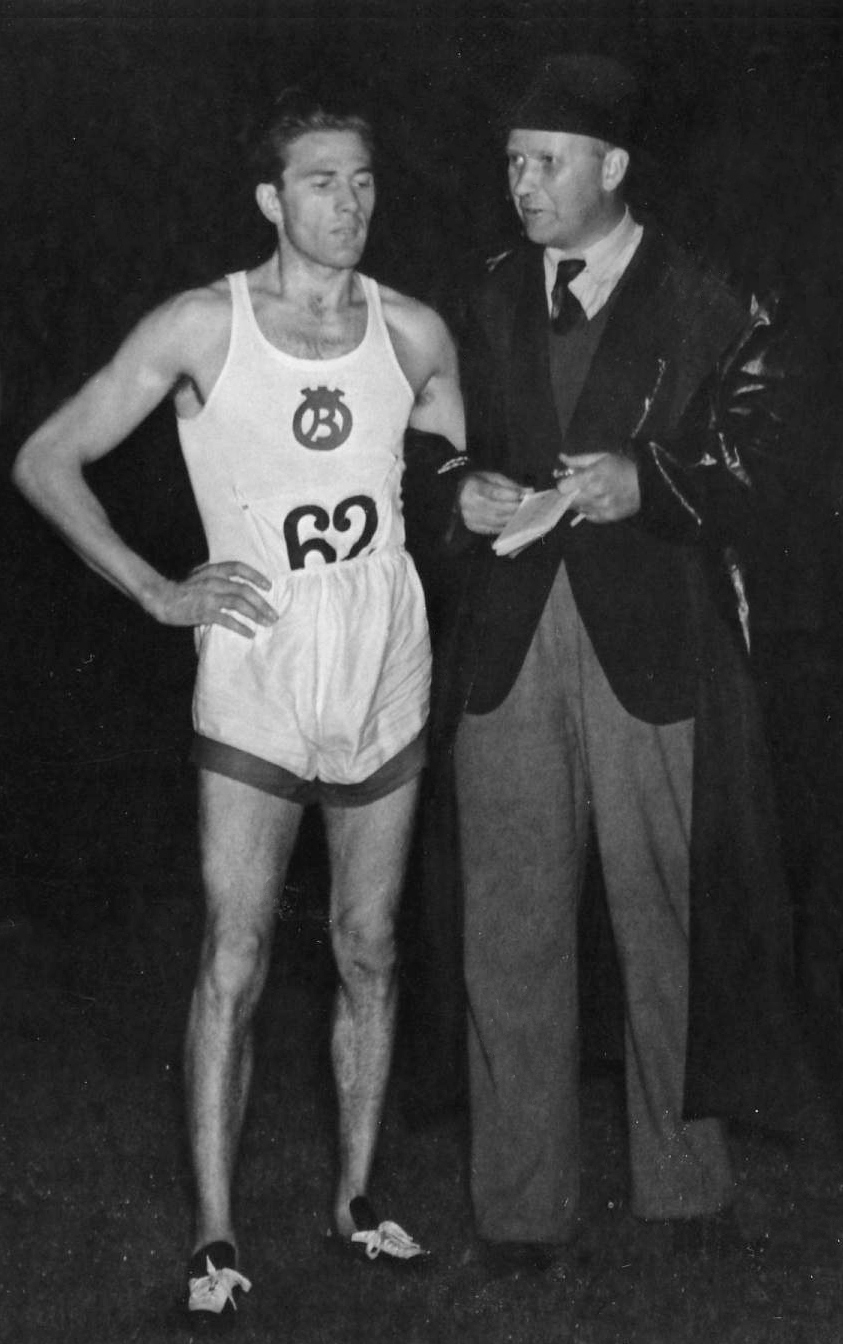
- Henry Jonsson (left) with Gösta Holmér

Personal information
- Born: 12 May 1912 Stugun, Sweden
- Died: 9 March 2001 (aged 88) Stockholm, Sweden
- Height: 1.81 m (5 ft 11 in)
- Weight: 70 kg (154 lb)

Sport
- Sport: Athletics
- Event(s): 1500 m, 5000 m
- Club: SoIK Hellas

Achievements and titles
- Personal best(s): 1500 m – 3:48.7 (1940); 5000 m – 14:18.8 (1939)
Medal record
Men's athletics
Representing Sweden
Olympic Games
Bronze medal – third place	1936 Berlin	5000 m
European Championships
Silver medal – second place	1938 Paris	5000 m

John Henry Jonsson (12 May 1912 – 9 March 2001) was a Swedish runner who won a bronze medal over 5000 m at the 1936 Summer Olympics. He finished second at the 1938 European Championships. In 1940 he changed his name to Henry Kälarne, and was awarded the Svenska Dagbladet Gold Medal that same year.

Jonsson worked as a firefighter in Stockholm. During his career he won 11 national titles: in the 1500 m (1936 and 1940), 5000 m (1935 and 1937–39) and 8000 m cross country (1935–39). In 1946 he was disqualified for violating amateur rules, together with Gunder Hägg and Arne Andersson.
