= Peter Ward (athlete) =

English athlete (1913–2009)

Personal information
- Nationality: British (English)
- Born: 7 February 1913 Berlin, German Empire
- Died: 13 January 2009 (aged 95) Norfolk, England
- Occupation: Business owner

Sport
- Sport: Athletics
- Club: University of Cambridge AC; Achilles Club
Medal record
Representing England
Men's Athletics
British Empire Games
Silver medal – second place	1938 Sydney	3 miles

Peter Hans Dudley Ward (7 February 1913 – 13 January 2009) was an English athlete who competed for Great Britain in the 1936 Summer Olympics.

== Career ==
Ward was born in Berlin, German Empire to an English father and German mother. He studied Economics at the University of Cambridge and won a blue for athletics and a half-blue for cross-country. He set a new 5,000 metres games record at the 1935 International Universities Games in Budapest.

Ward became the national 3 miles champion after winning the British AAA Championships title at the 1936 AAA Championships in a new 3 miles record.

One month later he was selected to represent Great Britain at the 1936 Olympic Games held in Berlin, where he finished eleventh in the 5000 metres event, narrowly beating out fellow English runner Frank Close.

Ward retained the 3 miles title at the 1937 AAA Championships.

At the 1938 British Empire Games he won the silver medal in the 3 miles competition. He also participated in the 6 miles contest but did not finish the race.

== Personal life ==
He was a stockbroker by trade before serving in the Second World War as a major in the Royal Artillery. After the war he made wooden toys at a workshop in London where he met his future wife Lona Fradeletto. Later in 1951 he and a friend, Cecil Chapman, set up Grant Instruments which made thermostatically controlled baths.
