= Kohei Murakoso =

Japanese long-distance runner (1905–1998)

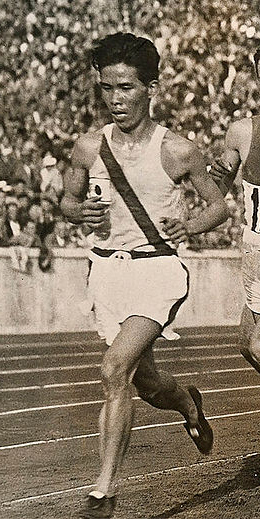
- Murakoso at the 1936 Olympics

Personal information
- Born: August 29, 1905 Miyazaki, Miyazaki, Japan
- Died: July 8, 1998 (aged 92) Asashi, Hyogo, Japan
- Education: Chuo University
- Height: 1.65 m (5 ft 5 in)
- Weight: 50 kg (110 lb)

Sport
- Sport: Long-distance running
- Event(s): 5000 m, 10000 m

Achievements and titles
- Personal best(s): 5000 m – 14:30.0 (1936); 10000 m – 30:25.0 (1936)

Kohei Murakoso (村社 講平, Murakoso Kōhei; August 29, 1905 – July 8, 1998) was a Japanese runner. He competed at the 1936 Olympics in the 5000 metres and 10,000 metres events and finished fourth on both occasions.

Murakoso graduated from the Chuo University and then worked at Kawasaki Heavy Industries. After World War II he demobilized from the Army and worked as an athletics reporter for Mainichi Shimbun. He also helped prepare the national athletics team to the 1952 Olympics. He died of acute respiratory failure, aged 92.
