= Eric Turner (athlete) =

British

Personal information
- Nationality: British (English)
- Born: fourth quarter 1909 Luton, England

Sport
- Sport: Athletics
- Event: javelin throw
- Club: Luton United Harriers; Port Sunlight AC

Eric Robert Turner (1909 – date of death unknown) was an English athlete.

== Biography ==
Turner was born in Luton, England and also competed under the name Robert Turner. He was a member of the Luton United Harriers before competing for the Army.

He represented England at the 1930 British Empire Games in Hamilton, Ontario, where he competed in the javelin throw event, finishing in fourth place. He was a guardsman at the time of the 1930 Games and lived in Luton.

He was on the podium five times at the AAA Championships from 1930 to 1937. He would later join the Birkenhead police force and competed for Port Sunlight AC and was the Northern javelin champion every year from 1936 to 1939 and 1948 and 1949.
