= Józef Noji =

Polish long-distance runner

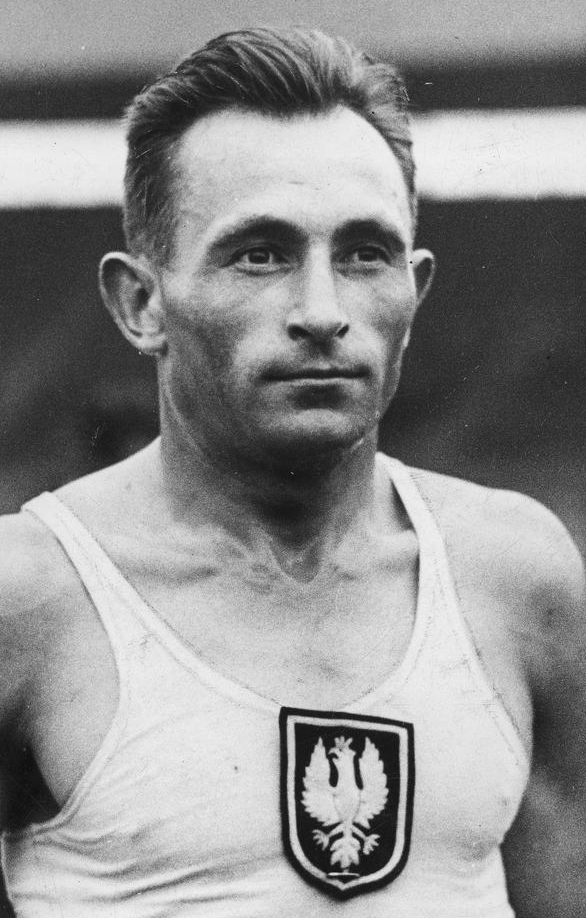
- Noji in London 1936

Personal information
- Born: 8 September 1909 Pęckowo, near Czarnków, Poland
- Died: 15 February 1943 (aged 33) Auschwitz concentration camp, occupied Poland
- Height: 170 cm (5 ft 7 in)
- Weight: 66 kg (146 lb)

Sport
- Sport: Athletics
- Event: 5000–10000 m
- Club: Syreny Warszawa

Achievements and titles
- Personal bests: 5000 m – 14:33.4 (1936); 10000 m – 31:17.4 (1938)

Józef Noji (8 September 1909 – 15 February 1943) was a Polish long-distance runner who competed at the 1936 Summer Olympics.

== Biography ==
Noji was one of the best long-distance runners of the Second Polish Republic At the 1936 Olympics, he finished fifth in the 5000 meter and 14th in the 10000 m events. He also placed fifth over 5000 m at the 1938 European Championships.

Noji was a multiple champion of Poland in the 5000, 10000 and cross country running. In 1936 he won the British AAA Championships title in the 6 miles event at the 1936 AAA Championships. He was twice elected to the List of 10 Best Athletes of Poland; in 1936 he was second, in 1937 – tenth.

Noji did not fight in the Polish September Campaign, but as early as late 1939 or early 1940, he joined the resistance movement. He was arrested by the Germans on 18 September 1940. After one year of imprisonment at Warsaw's notorious Pawiak prison, he was transported to Auschwitz. Noji was murdered on 15 February 1943, allegedly for trying to smuggle a letter. According to witnesses, he was killed by one of the SS guards (either Palitsch, Schopp or Stiwitz). Noji was posthumously awarded the Cross of Valor.

== Named in Noji's honour ==
=== Streets ===
- Aleja Józefa Nojiego in Warsaw, located on the southern bank of the Piaseczno Canal, near the Legia Stadium
- Józef Noji Street in Oświęcim, located in the Chemików Housing Estate

=== Schools ===
- Secondary School Complex in Czarnków
- Primary School in Pęcków
- Primary School No. 2 in Drezdenko

=== Other ===
- A commemorative plaque placed in 1986 on the church in Pęckowo
- An obelisk in Drawski Młyn
- A race organized for over thirty years under the name of the Józef Noji Mass Run taking place on the route from Drawski Młyn to Wieleń (through Pęckowo, Drawsko, Krzyż Wielkopolski, Huta Szklana)
- 2 stadiums: the Municipal Stadium in Drezdenko and the municipal stadium in Wieleń that can accommodate 2,500 spectators
- Noji's biography was included in Franciszek Graś's book J. Noji, Sportsman-Patriot
