= Aquatics at the 1930 British Empire Games =

- Venue: Hamilton Municipal Pool
- Location: Hamilton, Ontario, Canada
- Dates: 16 – 23 August 1930

At the 1930 British Empire Games in Hamilton, Ontario, Canada, there were two aquatics disciplines – swimming and diving. There were four diving events contested and eleven swimming events. The aquatics programme included the only women's events of the games.

These events were held at the Hamilton Municipal Pool (now the Jimmy Thompson Memorial Pool), which was built specifically for these games. At that time, it was the best competition pool in the British Empire.

England topped the swimming medal table with six gold medals, although Canada equalled the number of six golds by virtue of winning three of the four diving gold medals.

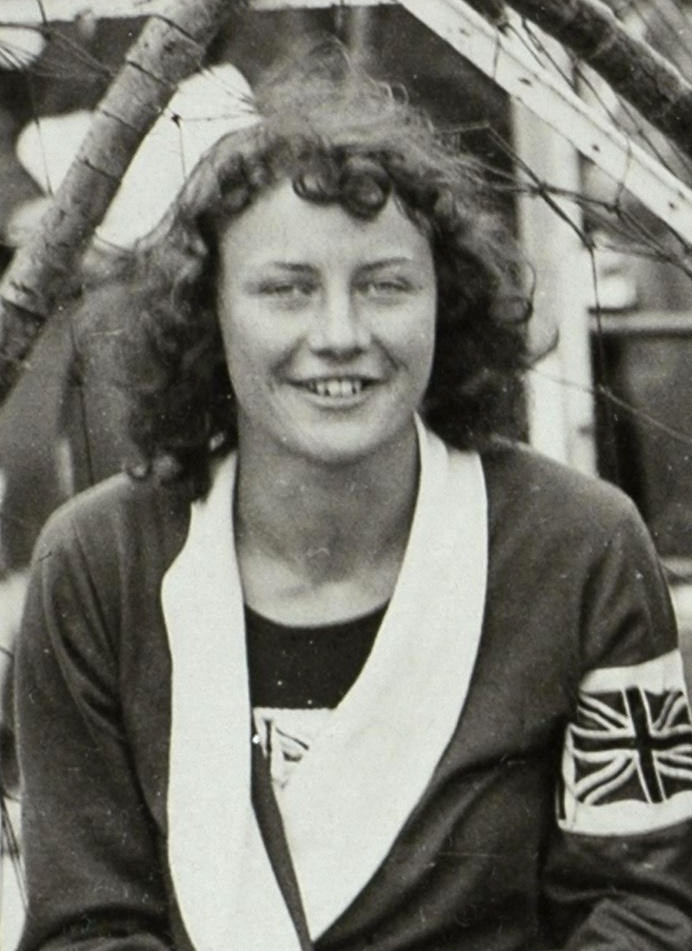
Joyce Cooper won four gold medals in the women's events

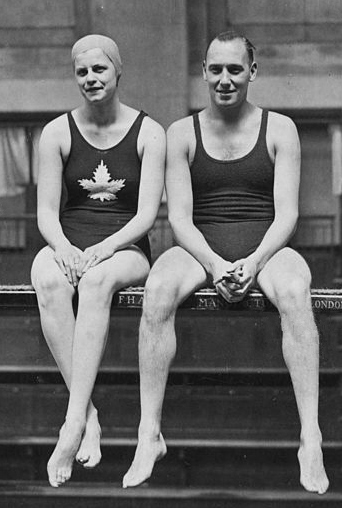
Irene Pirie of Canada and Frederick Milton of England both won medals and would marry in 1935

== Medal table ==
* Host nation (Canada)

Medals won by nation with totals, ranked by number of golds—sortable
Rank	Nation	Gold	Silver	Bronze	Total
1	Canada (CAN)*	6	5	5	16
2	England (ENG)	6	4	4	14
3	Australia (AUS)	2	0	0	2
4	South Africa (SAF)	1	0	0	1
5	Scotland (SCO)	0	2	3	5
6	Wales (WAL)	0	2	1	3
7	New Zealand (NZL)	0	2	0	2
Totals (7 entries)		15	15	13	43

== Medal summary ==
=== Diving ===
==== Men's events ====
Event	Gold		Silver		Bronze	
3 m springboard	Alfred Phillips (CAN)	147	Cyril Kennett (CAN)	138	Arthur Stott (CAN)	127
10 m platform	Alfred Phillips (CAN)	90.6	Samuel Walker (CAN)	83.3	Thomas Scott (ENG)	82.3

==== Women's events ====
Event	Gold		Silver		Bronze	
3 m springboard	Oonagh Whitsett (SAF)	90.1	Doris Ogilvie (CAN)	89.7	Mollie Bailey (CAN)	88.7
10 m platform	Pearl Stoneham (CAN)	39.3	Helen McCormack (CAN)	38.3	Only two entrants	

=== Swimming ===
==== Men's events ====
Event	Gold		Silver		Bronze	
100 yd freestyle	Munroe Bourne (CAN)	56.0	Norman Brooks (ENG)	56.1	Bert Gibson (CAN)	
400 yd freestyle	Noel Ryan (AUS)	4.39.8	Gordon Bridson (NZL)	4.45.8	George Burleigh (CAN)	
1500 yd freestyle	Noel Ryan (AUS)	18:55.4	Gordon Bridson (NZL)	19:41	George Burleigh (CAN)	
100 yd backstroke	Bill Trippett (ENG)	1:05.4	Willie Francis (SCO)	1:06	John Besford (ENG)	1:07
200 yd breaststroke	Jack Aubin (CAN)	2.38.4	Stanley Bell (ENG)	2.39.6	Reginald Flint (ENG)	2:45
4×200 yd freestyle relay	Canada; Bert Gibson; Munroe Bourne; George Burleigh; James Thompson	8:42.4	England; Freddie Milton; Norman Brooks; Arthur Watts; Joseph Whiteside	8:43	Only two teams entered	

==== Women's events ====
Event	Gold		Silver		Bronze	
100 yd freestyle	Joyce Cooper (ENG)	1:03.0	Ellen King (SCO)	1:07	Valerie Davies (WAL)	
400 yd freestyle	Joyce Cooper (ENG)	5:25	Valerie Davies (WAL)	5:28	Cissie Stewart (SCO)	
100 yd backstroke	Joyce Cooper (ENG)	1:15	Valerie Davies (WAL)	1:17	Phyllis Harding (ENG)	1:18
200 yd breaststroke	Cecelia Wolstenholme (ENG)	2:54 [WR]	Margery Hinton (ENG)		Ellen King (SCO)	
4×100 yd freestyle relay	England; Joyce Cooper; Doreen Cooper; Olive Joynes; Phyllis Harding	4:32.8	Canada; Betty Edwards; Irene Pirie; Marjorie Linton; Peggy Bailey	4:33.0	Scotland; Cissie Stewart; Ellen King; Jean McDowell; Jessie McVey	4:37.0

== Finals ==
=== 100 yd freestyle ===
- 1 (Canada) Munroe Bourne
- 2 (England) Norman Brooks
- 3 (Canada) Bert Gibson
- 4 (England) Joseph Whiteside
- 5 (Australia) Ivan William Cameron

=== 400 yd freestyle ===
- 1 (Australia) Noel Ryan
- 2 (New Zealand) Gordon Bridson
- 3 (Canada) George Burleigh
- 4 (England) Joseph Whiteside
- 5 (England) Freddie Milton
- 6 (Canada) Munroe Bourne
- 7 (England) Norman Brooks (dnf)

=== 1500 yd freestyle ===
- 1 (Australia) Noel Ryan
- 2 (New Zealand) Gordon Bridson
- 3 (Canada) George Burleigh
- 4 (England) Jack Hatfield
- 5 (Canada) James Thompson
- 6 (Canada) Cyril Kennett
- ? (Canada) Munroe Bourne

=== 100 yd backstroke ===
- 1 (England) Bill Trippett
- 2 (Scotland) Willie Francis
- 3 (England) John Besford
- 4 (Australia) Ivan William Cameron

=== 200 yd breaststroke ===
- 1 (Canada) Jack Aubin
- 2 (England) Stanley Bell
- 3 (England) Reginald Flint

=== 4×200 yd freestyle relay ===
- 1 (Canada) Bert Gibson, Munroe Bourne, George Burleigh, James Thompson
- 2 (England) Freddie Milton, Norman Brooks, Arthur Watts, Joseph Whiteside
- Only two teams entered

=== 100 yd freestyle ===
- 1 (England) Joyce Cooper
- 2 (Scotland) Ellen King
- 3 (Wales) Valerie Davies

=== 400 yd freestyle ===
- 1 (England) Joyce Cooper
- 2 (Wales) Valerie Davies
- 3 (Scotland) Cissie Stewart
- 4 (Canada) Irene Pirie
- 5 (South Africa) Jenny Maakal
- 6 (Canada) Betty Edwards

=== 100 yd backstroke ===
- 1 (England) Joyce Cooper
- 2 (Wales) Valerie Davies
- 3 (England) Phyllis Harding
- 4 (Scotland) Ellen King
- 5 ?
- 6 (Scotland) Cissie Stewart

=== 200 yd breaststroke ===
- 1 (England) Cecelia Wolstenholme
- 2 (England) Margery Hinton
- 3 (Scotland) Ellen King
- 4 (Canada) Molly Bailey
- 5 ?
- 6 (New Zealand) Gladys Pidgeon

=== 4×100 yd freestyle relay ===
- 1 (England) Joyce Cooper, Doreen Cooper, Olive Joynes, Phyllis Harding
- 2 (Canada) Betty Edwards, Irene Pirie, Marjorie Linton, Peggy Bailey
- 3 (Scotland) Cissie Stewart, Ellen King, Jean McDowell, Jessie McVey

=== 3 m springboard ===
- 1 (South Africa) Oonagh Whitsett
- 2 (Canada) Doris Ogilvie
- 3 (Canada) Mollie Bailey
- 4 (Canada) Helen McCormack
