= England at the 1930 British Empire Games =

- CGF code: ENG
- CGA: Commonwealth Games England

in Hamilton, Ontario, Canada
- Medals Ranked 1st: Gold 25 Silver 23 Bronze 13 Total 61

British Empire Games appearances
- 1930; 1934; 1938; 1950; 1954; 1958; 1962; 1966; 1970; 1974; 1978; 1982; 1986; 1990; 1994; 1998; 2002; 2006; 2010; 2014; 2018; 2022; 2026; 2030

England at the 1930 British Empire Games (abbreviated ENG) was the first appearance of the country at the inaugural games. In the first edition held in Hamilton, Ontario, Canada, from 16 August to 23 August 1930, with 11 teams taking part.

England topped the medal table with 25 gold medals, 22 silver medals and 13 bronze medals.

== Medal table (top three) ==
Rank	Nation	Gold	Silver	Bronze	Total
1	England	25	22	13	60
2	Canada	20	17	17	54
3	South Africa	6	4	8	18
Totals (3 entries)		51	43	38	132

== Team ==
The team is listed below.

=== Athletics ===
Name	Age	Occupation	Club	Medal
George Bailey	24	Labourer	Salford Harriers	Gold medal
Bernard Babington Smith	24	Merchant	London AC	none
Herbert Bignall	24	Carpenter	Highgate Harriers	none
George Bird	30	Clerk	Finchley Harriers	none
Laurence Bond	24	Medical Student	Cambridge Univ AC	none
Edward Bradbrooke	24	Leather Manufacturer	Achilles Club	none
Kenneth Brangwin	23	Electrician	South London Harriers	Gold medal
David Burghley	25	Insurance Manager	Achilles Club	,,
James Cohen	24	Director (private company)	Achilles Club	Silver medal
Jerry Cornes	20	Student	Oxford Univ AC	Bronze medal
Stanley Engelhart	20	Clerk	York Harriers & AC	,
Tom Evenson	20	Carpenter	Salford Harriers	Bronze medal
Sam Ferris	30	Royal Air Force	RAF AC	Silver medal
Francis Foley	27	Sergeant (Scots Guards)	Surrey AC	none
Howard Ford	24	no occupation	Achilles Club	Silver medal
Fred Gaby	35	Civil Servant	Polytechnic Harriers	Bronze medal
Michael Gutteridge	21	Undergraduate	Cambridge Univ AC	none
John Hanlon	25	Detective (C.I.D)	Birchfield Harriers	Silver medal
Tommy Hampson	22	School Teacher	Achilles Club	Gold medal
Ernie Harper	28	Blacksmith	Hallamshire Harriers	Silver medal
Roland Harper	25	Accountant	Achilles Club	none
John Heap	22	Clerk	Surrey AC	Silver medal
Hubert Hedges	22	Clerk	South London Harriers	none
Henry Higgins	23	Clerk	Surrey AC	none
Robert Howland	25	Teacher	Achilles Club	Silver medal
Roger Leigh-Wood	23	Merchant	Achilles Club	,
Vernon Morgan	26	Stockbroker	Achilles Club	Bronze medal
Douglas Neame	28	Lieutenant (Royal Navy)	Royal Navy AC	Bronze medal
Malcolm Nokes	33	Schoolmaster	Achilles Club	Gold medal
Brian Oddie	25	Civil Servant	South London Harriers	none
Ernie Page	19	Shipping Clerk	Blackheath Harriers	Silver medal
Harry Payne	37	Clerk	Woodford Green AC	none
Kenneth Pridie	24	Medicine	Bristol University AC	none
Reg Revans	23	Merchant	Achilles Club	,
William Simmons	27	Salesman	Polytechnic Harriers	none
Stan Smith	26	Mechanic	Birchfield Harriers	none
Leslie Snow	22	Bank Clerk	London AC	none
Wilfrid Tatham	31	Schoolmaster	Achilles Club	none
Reg Thomas	23	Royal Air Force	RAF AC	,
Stan Tomlin	24	Meter Sales Engineer	Highgate Harriers	Gold medal
Stuart Townend	21	Student	Oxford Univ AC	Gold medal
Eric Turner	20	Guardsman	Luton United Harriers	none
Geoffrey Turner	23	no occupation	Earlestown Viaduct AC	none
Jack Winfield	22	Miner	Derby and County AC	Bronze medal

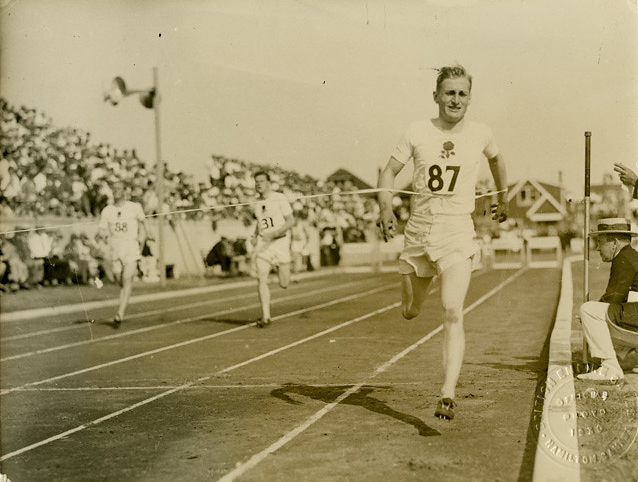
Lord Burghley wins the 440 yards hurdles at the 1930 British Empire Games

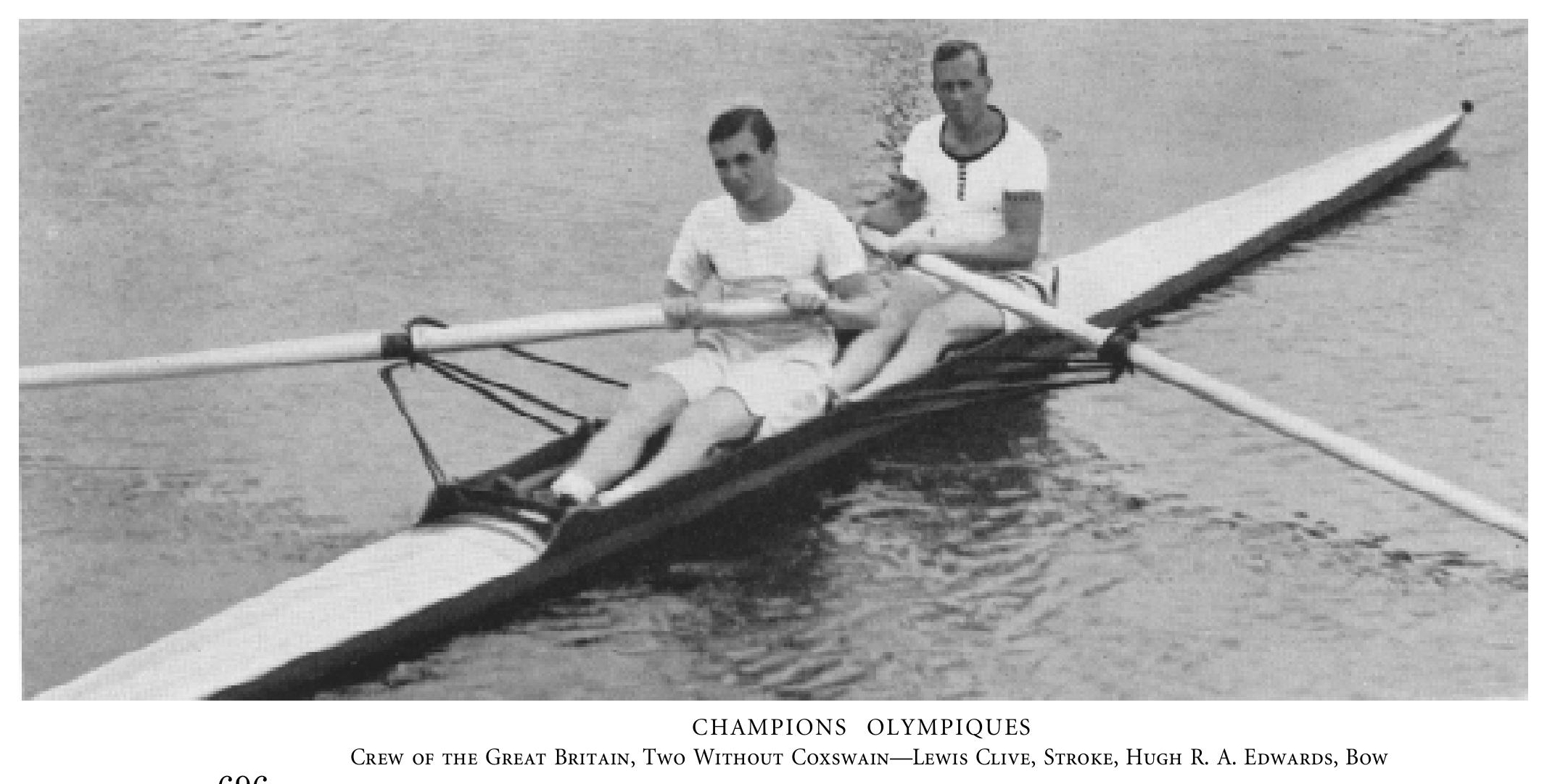
Hugh Edwards (right) won double gold

=== Boxing ===
Name	Age	Occupation	Club	Medal
Frank Brooman	25	Telephone Engineer	Northampton Polytechnic Club	Bronze medal
Joe Goyder	23	Police Constable	Old Goldsmiths ABC	Gold medal
Albert Love	19	Warhouseman	Cardiff Central BC	Bronze medal
Fred Mallin	26	Motor Mechanic	Eton Manor ABC	Gold medal
Freddie Meachem	23	Civil Servant	Civil Service ABC	Gold medal
Harry Mizler	17	Fishmonger	Oxford & St. George's ABC	Gold medal
Thomas Pardoe	19	Metropolitan ABC	Haulage Contractor	Silver medal
Anthony Stuart	23	Soldier	London Fire Brigade ABC	Gold medal

=== Diving ===
Name	Age	Occupation	Club	Medal
Thomas Scott	23	Police Officer	Oldham Police	Bronze medal

=== Lawn bowls ===
Name	Age	Occupation	Club	Medal
Robert Colquhoun	48	Coal merchant	Bromley BC	Gold medal
James Edney	60	retired grocer	Atherley BC, Southampton	Gold medal
James Frith	69	retired life assurance agent	Belgrave BC	Gold medal
Ernie Gudgeon	49	Insurance Collector	Preston BC (Brighton)	Gold medal
Tommy Hills	46	Auctioneer	Eltham BC	Gold medal
Albert Hough	53	Law Accountant	Gosforth BC	Gold medal
George Wright	35	Cinema Proprietor	Southern Railway BC, Eastleigh	Gold medal

=== Rowing ===
Name	Age	Occupation	Club	Medal
Jack Beresford	31	Dental Student	Thames RC	Silver medal
Humphrey Boardman	26	Clerk	London RC	,
Fred Bradley	22	no occupation	Pembroke RC, Oxford	Bronze medal
Justin Brown	25	Royal Air Force	London RC	Gold medal
Roger Close-Brooks	23	Stockbrokers Clerk	London RC	Gold medal
Geoffrey Crawford	26	Agent	London RC	Gold medal
Hugh Edwards	23	Student	London RC	,
Francis Fitzwilliams	22	Clerk	London RC	,
Arthur Harby	24	Engineer	London RC	,
Edgar Howitt	21	Clerk	London RC	Gold medal
Terence O'Brien	24	no occupation	London RC	Gold medal

=== Swimming ===
Men

Name	Age	Occupation	Club	Medal
Stanley Bell	23	Engineer	Penguin, London	Silver medal
John Besford	19	Dental Student	South Manchester	Bronze medal
Norman Brooks	20	Police Officer	Oldham Police	,
Reginald Flint	27	Dental Mechanic	Sheffield	Bronze medal
Jack Hatfield	37	Sports shop proprietor	Middlesbrough ASC	
Freddie Milton	23	Accountant	London	Silver medal
Bill Trippett	21	Police Constable	Sheffield Police	Gold medal
Arthur Watts	18	Bank Clerk	East Ham	Silver medal
Joseph Whiteside	24	Police	South Manchester	Silver medal

Women

Name	Age	Occupation	Club	Medal
Joyce Cooper	21	no occupation	Mermaid SC, London	,,,
Doreen Cooper	22	Artist	London	Gold medal
Phyllis Harding	22	Insurance Clerk	Croydon Ladies SC	,
Margery Hinton	15	no occupation	Eccles	Silver medal
Olive Joynes	21	Secretary	Bournemouth SC	Gold medal
Cecelia Wolstenholme	15	Shorthand Typist	Moss Side SC, Manchester	Gold medal

=== Wrestling ===
Name	Age	Occupation	Club	Medal
Harold Angus	26	Insurance Inspector	Doncaster	Silver medal
Edgar Bacon	42	Medicine	London AWS	Silver medal
Stanley Bissell	24	Police Constable	Met Police AC	Silver medal
Harry Johnson	27	Turner	Middlesex	Silver medal
Joseph Reid	25	Miner	Leigh H. & A.C.	Silver medal
Albert Sangwine	29	Civil Servant	Ashdown AC	Silver medal
