= Doreen Cooper =

English swimmer (1907–2003)

Personal information
- Born: 30 December 1907 Ceylon
- Died: August 2003 (aged 95)

Sport
- Sport: Swimming
Medal record
British Empire Games
Gold medal – first place	1930 Hamilton	4x100 yard freestyle relay

Mary Doreen Cooper-Wright (30 December 1907 – August 2003) was an English swimmer who competed in the 1930 British Empire Games, where she won a gold medal alongside Olive Joynes, Phyllis Harding, and her younger sister Joyce in the 4x100 yard freestyle relay. Outside of sports she worked as a textile designer and was involved in local politics in Buckinghamshire. Recorded in the form of a diary, her letters to her husband, who went missing while serving in World War II, were published in 2012.

== Early life and athletic career ==
Raised in Sri Lanka (then known as Ceylon), Doreen was the oldest of three siblings that included Joyce Cooper, a swimmer who won four medals across two editions of the Olympic Games. She attended Cheltenham Ladies College and studied textile design at the Royal College of Art. She was athletically active in both ice hockey and swimming, serving as a British national team captain in the former. In the latter she competed at the 1930 British Empire Games, where she won a gold medal alongside Joyce, Olive Joynes, and Phyllis Harding in the 4x100 yard freestyle relay.

== Marriage to Gilbert Wright and later life ==
After the Games, Cooper met Gilbert Wright while touring Quebec's Plains of Abraham. They married in June 1934, with Joyce as a bridesmaid, and had three children. Wright joined the Auxiliary Air Force in 1939 to serve in World War II and was declared missing in action in 1940. Nonetheless, Cooper continued her habit of writing daily letters to her husband by recording them in a diary, until he was confirmed deceased in 1943. Her son Nick died a year later, of tuberculosis, aged eight.

During the conflict Cooper worked with the Women’s Royal Voluntary Service and, afterwards, served on the county council of Buckinghamshire. She later worked as a textile designer and teacher. She died in August 2003, at the age of 95, and her diary was rediscovered the following year in an attic. The Leek Wootton History Group received a government grant to publish her diary, which contained a detailed account of local wartime life intermixed with the emotional tale of her lost husband. It was released in 2012 under the title Doreen's Diary: She Could Not Have Loved More.
