= Jessie McVey =

Scottish swimmer

Personal information
- Born: 23 October 1913 Edinburgh, Scotland
- Died: 29 January 1980 (aged 66) Leith,Scotland

Sport
- Sport: Swimming
- Strokes: backstroke, freestyle
- Club: Warrender Baths Club
Medal record
Women's swimming
Representing Scotland
British Empire Games
Bronze medal – third place	1930 Hamilton	4×100 yd freestyle relay

Jessie Dorothy Octavia McVey (23 October 1913 – 29 January 1980) was a Scottish swimmer who specialised in backstroke and freestyle.

== Biography ==
McVey competed at the 1930 British Empire Games, where she won a bronze medal in the 4×100 yards freestyle relay. At the time of the Games she was living at 8 Chesser Avenue in Edinburgh.

McVey was a member of the Warrender Baths Club, Edinburgh. She was the Scottish backstroke champion and in 1932 she finished runner-up behind club and country teammate Jean McDowell in the national 100 yards freestyle championship.

She married Richard Munro Hogg, a pondmaster (swimming pool manager) at Stonehaven in 1933.
