= Gladys Pidgeon =

New Zealand swimmer

Gladys Marley
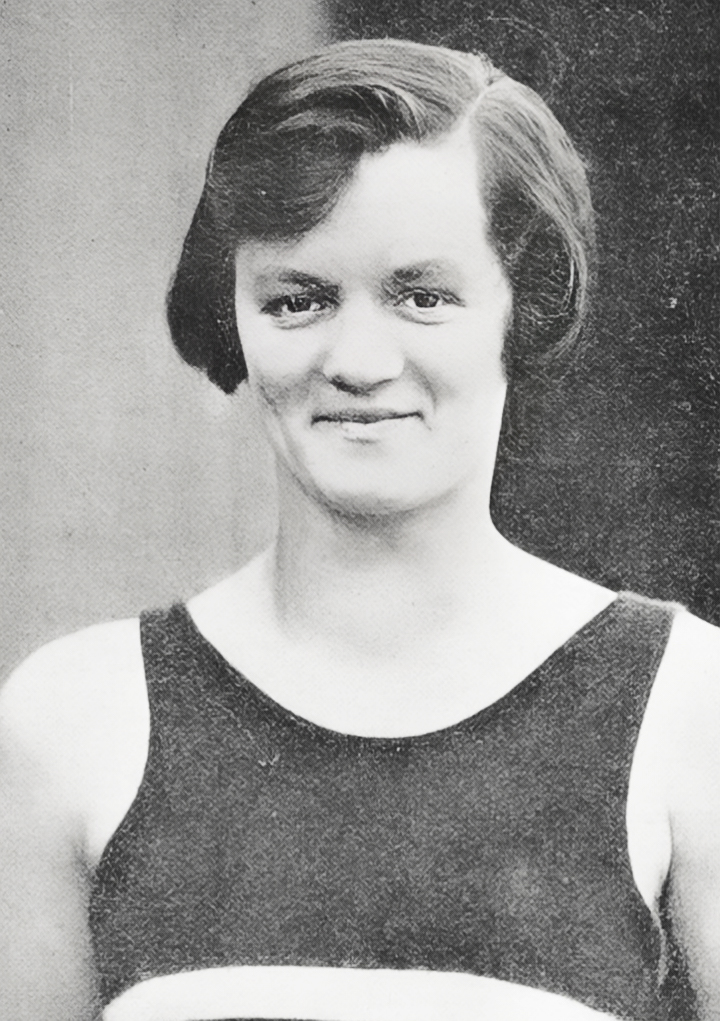
- Pidgeon, c. 1925

Personal information
- Birth name: Gladys Eileen Pidgeon
- Born: 21 March 1906; Dunedin, New Zealand
- Died: 19 November 2002 (aged 96); Wellington, New Zealand
- Years active: 1925–1931
- Height: 1.61 m (5 ft 3 1/2 in)
- Spouse: Rupert Kenneth Marley (m. 1932; died 1995)

Sport
- Country: New Zealand
- Sport: Swimming

Achievements and titles
- National finals: 220 yds breaststroke champion (1925, 1926, 1927, 1928, 1930, 1931)

Gladys Eileen Marley (née Pidgeon; 21 March 1906 − 19 November 2002) was a New Zealand swimmer, who represented her country at the 1930 British Empire Games in Hamilton, Ontario.

Born in Dunedin in 1906, Marley was the daughter of Arthur Pidgeon and his wife Jane Dickenson Ross. She grew up in Sawyers Bay, Whanganui, Palmerston North and Auckland; her father worked with the railways and consequently the family moved around the country. After leaving Palmerston North Girls' High School, Marley began working as a clerk at the Milne & Choyce department store in Auckland, aged 14.

She was the New Zealand 220 yards breaststroke champion every year from 1925 and 1931, except in 1929 when she was second to Lily Copplestone. Marley was the only female member of the New Zealand team that travelled to the first British Empire Games in Canada in 1930, and was only allowed to go after her mother agreed to pay her own way to chaperone her daughter. She recorded a personal best in finishing sixth in the final of the 200 yards breaststroke, won by Cecelia Wolstenholme of England in world-record time.

Marley retired from swimming after the 1931 national championships, and married Ken Marley, a police constable, at St David's Presbyterian church on Khyber Pass Road, Auckland, the following year. The couple went on to have two children.

Marley died in Wellington in 2002, and her ashes were buried in Kelvin Grove Cemetery, Palmerston North. She had been predeceased by her husband in 1995.
