= Warrender Baths =

Swimming center in Edinburgh, Scotland

Coordinates: 55°56′07″N 3°11′49″W

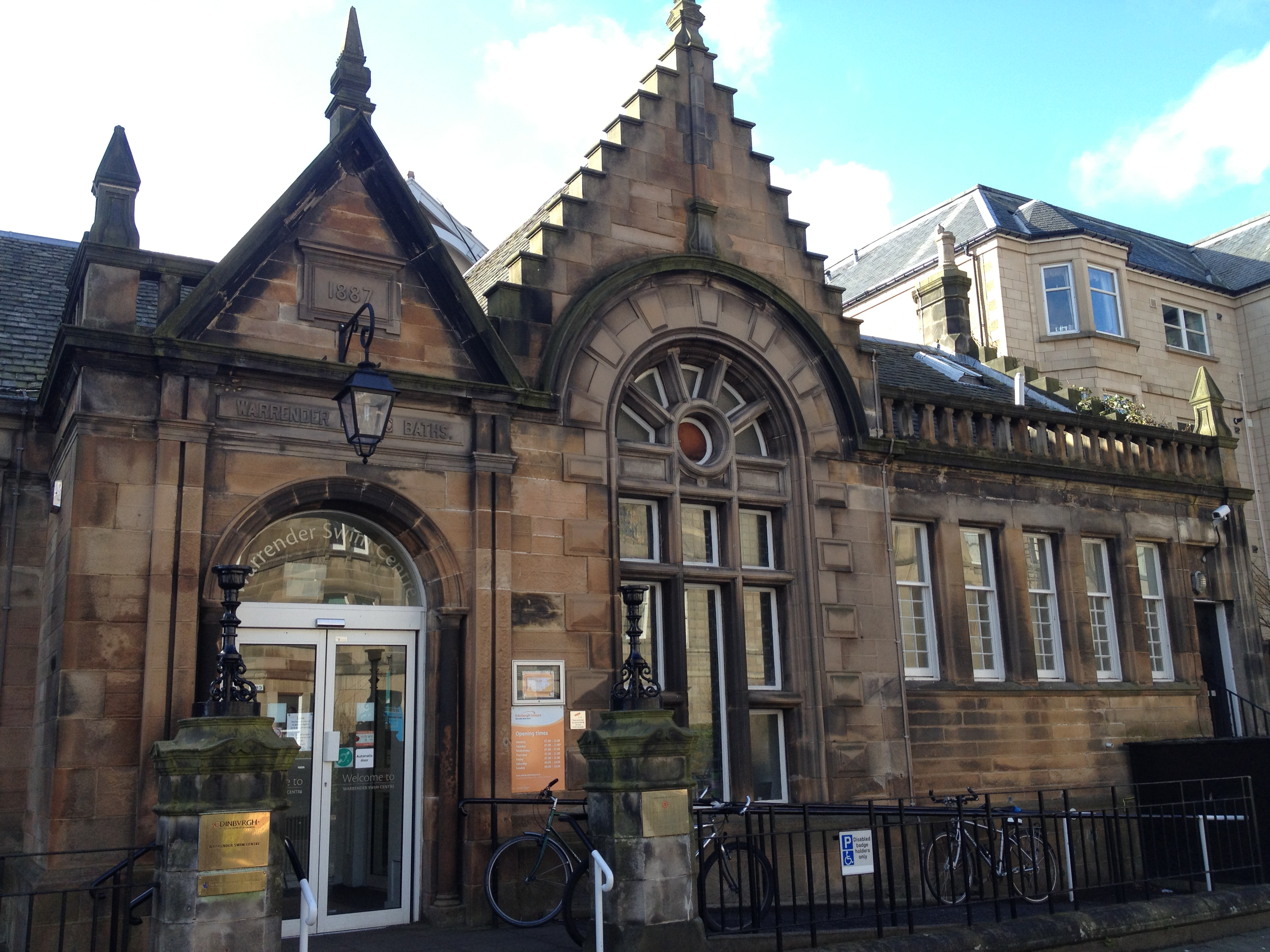
Entrance to Warrender Baths

Warrender Swim Centre – traditionally known as Warrender Baths – is a swimming pool and fitness complex that opened in 1887 in Marchmont, Edinburgh.

It consists of a pool 25 yards (23 m) in length, a sauna, and an assortment of fitness equipment. It is notable for its Victorian architecture with bright interior and its old-fashioned poolside changing facilities. The baths is a Category B listed building.

== History ==
In 1886, some Edinburgh residents and members of the Bellahouston Private Baths Club, Glasgow, decided to build a swimming club in Edinburgh. Frank Y. Henderson therefore formed the Warrender Private Baths Club Limited which bought some land from Sir George Warrender, 6th Baronet, and, using the local architect Robert Paterson, had the baths built. The original cost was £11,000 and the baths were opened on Saturday 17 December 1887 by Sir George.

Warrender Baths differed from many similar facilities in Edinburgh in that they were originally built privately with the emphasis on fitness and leisure. Many of the city's comparable swimming pools were part of a much wider scheme to build public baths to promote cleanliness and hygiene amongst the working classes, who did not have routine access at the time to sanitation. Warrender Baths also sported a billiard room and a reading room.

Initially the facilities were a success, but by 1906 were no longer viable and were closed. They were bought by the city for £3000, where they joined the city's portfolio of similar pools.

Periodically suffering further closure threats, they were refurbished in 2005 and in 2020 and are now secure.

The baths are home to the Warrender Baths Club which is said to be the oldest, most famous and most successful swimming club in Scotland. David Wilkie the Olympic gold medallist swimmer, Ellen King and Keri-Anne Payne both silver Olympic medallists, bronze medal Olympic swimmers Paul Easter, Gordon Downie and Alan McClatchey, bronze Paralympic medal winners George Simpson and Sean Fraser and Olympic finalist Jean McDowell swam and trained with Warrender Baths Club.

In November 2009, a swimming customer at Warrender Swim Centre was hit with glass due to a glazing fault, resulting in an injury to his arm and requiring the closure of the centre as a precautionary measure to ensure the safety of customers. The baths were opened again in June 2010.

The baths were closed for refurbishment on 24 December 2020. The work involves updating the changing rooms, re-tiling the pool side, opening up the spectator area, installing air-cooling, adding a new sauna and general redecoration. The centre reopened to the public on Tuesday 23 May 2023.

== See also ==
- Edinburgh Royal Infirmary – one of the oldest swimming baths in Edinburgh was at the first purpose-built site of the hospital
- Drumsheugh Baths Club
