= Canada at the 1930 British Empire Games =

- CGF code: CAN

in Hamilton, Ontario, Canada
- Competitors: 86 in 7 sports
- Medals Ranked 2nd: Gold 20 Silver 15 Bronze 19 Total 54

British Empire Games appearances
- 1930; 1934; 1938; 1950; 1954; 1958; 1962; 1966; 1970; 1974; 1978; 1982; 1986; 1990; 1994; 1998; 2002; 2006; 2010; 2014; 2018; 2022; 2026; 2030

Other related appearances
- Newfoundland (1930, 1934)

Canada was host country for the 1930 British Empire Games, which were held at Hamilton, Ontario, and was one of only eleven countries to be represented at the inaugural Games.

Melville Marks (Bobby) Robinson of Canada had been asked to organise the inaugural British Empire Games in 1928.

At these first Games, Canada won 54 medals against England's 61.

Newfoundland competed separately at the 1930 British Empire Games, but did not win any medals. Newfoundland also sent a team to the 1934 British Empire Games, but from 1938 has competed as part of Canada.

== Medals ==
	Gold	Silver	Bronze	Total
Canada	20	15	19	54

== Athletics ==
Men's 100 Yard Dash

- Percy Williams - Gold, 9.9 s
- Johnny R. Fitzpatrick - Bronze, 10.2 s
- James/Jim "Buster" R. Brown - 3rd in Heat 2
- Leigh Miller - 4th in Heat 3

Men's 120 Yard Hurdles

- Howard Baker - 4th in Heat 1
- Arthur "Art" Ravensdale - Disqualified
- Bill Pierdon - Disqualified

Men's 220 Yard Dash

- Johnny R. Fitzpatrick - Silver
- James "Jimmy" A. Ball - 5th in Final
- Napoleon Bourdeau - 3rd in Heat 2
- Frederick "Fred" William McBeth - 4th in Heat 3

Men's 440 Yard Run/Quarter Mile

- Alexander S. Wilson - Gold, 48.8 s
- James "Jimmy" A. Ball - 5th in Final, 49.4 s (in Heat ?)
- Stan B. Glover - 3rd in Heat 2
- John Hickey - 4th in Heat 2
- Walter Connolly - 4th in Heat 3

Men's 440 Yard Hurdles

- Walter Connolly - 5th in Final
- John Hickey - 6th in Final
- Frederick "Fred" William McBeth - Heat

Men's 880 Yard Run/Half-Mile

- Alexander S. Wilson - Bronze, 1 min 54.9 s
- Percy Pickard - 8th in Final
- Brant Little - 6th in Heat 1

Men's 1 Mile Run

- Jack S. Walters - 4th in Final

Men's 2 Mile Steeplechase

- Art S. Wilkins - 4th in Final
- Bill Reid - 5th in Final
- Pete Suttie - 6th in Final

Men's 3 Mile Run

- Walter Hornby
- Fred Sargeant
- George Ball

Men's 6 Mile Run

- Billy Reynolds - 6th
- Wilf McCluskey - 8th
- George Irwin - 9th
- Harold Webster - 10th

Men's 4 x 110 Yard Relay

- Canada - Gold, 42.2 s
  - James/Jim "Buster" R. Brown
  - Johnny R. Fitzpatrick
  - Leigh Miller
  - Ralph A. Adams

Men's 4 x 440 Yard Relay/1 Mile Relay

- Canada - Silver, 3 min 19.8 s
  - Alexander S. Wilson
  - Arthur "Art" Alan Scott
  - James "Jimmy" A. Ball
  - Stan B. Glover

Men's Marathon

- Johnny Miles - Bronze, 2 h 48 min 23 s
- Percival Wyer - 4th
- Silas McLellan - 6th
- Norman Dack - 7th
- Ezra Lee - 10th
- Jack/John Cuthbert - Did not finish

Men's Shot Put

- M.C. "Charlie" Herman - Bronze, 42 ft 7 in (12.98 m)
- Abe Zvonkin - 4th, 41 ft 5 1/2 in (12.64 m)
- John A. Cameron
- Archie Stewart

Men's Discus Throw

- M.C. "Charlie" Herman - Silver, 135 ft 3 in (41.22 m)
- Abe Zvonkin - Bronze, 135 ft 1 in (41.17 m)
- George W. Sutherland
- Archie Stewart

Men's Javelin

- Doral W. Pilling - Silver, 183 ft 6 in (55.93 m)
- Archie Stewart - 6th, 147 ft 2 in (44.86 m)

Men's Hammer Throw

- John A. Cameron - Bronze, 145 ft 10 in (44.45 m)
- Archie McDiarmid - 6th, 139 ft 3 in (42.44 m)
- George W. Sutherland
- M.C. "Charlie" Herman

Men's Long Jump

- Leonard "Len" Hutton - Gold, 23 ft 7 1/2 in (7.201 m)
- Chester Smith - 4th, 22 ft 3 1/2 in (6.794 m)
- Gordon "Spike" Smallacombe - 5th, 21 ft 8 1/4 in (6.610 m)

Men's Triple Jump

- Gordon "Spike" Smallacombe - Gold, 48 ft 5 in (14.76 m)
- Leonard "Len" Hutton, Bronze, 45 ft 7 1/4 in (13.90 m)
- George W. Sutherland - 4th, 45 ft 1 1/4 in (13.75 m)

Men's High Jump

- William/Clarence Stargratt - Bronze, 6 ft 1 in (1.85 m)
- Duncan Anderson McNaughton - 4th
- Gordon "Spike" Smallacombe
- Jack/John Portland

Men's Pole Vault

- Victor Pickard - Gold, 12 ft 3 in (3.73 m)
- Robert Stoddard - Bronze, 12 ft 0 in (3.66 m)
- Alf "Sunny" Gilbert - 4th

== Boxing ==
Men's Flyweight Division (51 kg)

- R. Galloway - Bronze

Men's Bantamweight Division (54 kg)

- J. Keller - Bronze

Men's Lightweight Division (60 kg)

- G. Canzano - Silver

Men's Welterweight Division (67 kg)

- H. Williams - Silver

Men's Light Heavyweight Division (81 kg)

- A. Pitcher - Bronze

Men's Heavyweight Division (91 kg)

- W. Skimming - Silver

== Diving ==
Men's High Diving/Tower

- Alfred Phillips - Gold, 147 points
- Samuel Walker - Silver, 83.3 points

Women's High Diving/Tower

- Pearl Stoneham - Gold, 39.3 points
- Helen McCormack - Silver, 38.3 points

Men's Springboard Diving

- Alfred Phillips - Gold, 90.6 points
- Cyril Kennett - Silver, 130 points
- Arthur H. Stott - Bronze, 127 points

Women's Springboard Diving

- Doris Ogilvie - Silver, 89.7 points
- H. Mollie Bailey - Bronze, 88.7 points

== Lawn Bowls ==
Men's Doubles

- Canada - Bronze
  - Arthur S. Reid
  - W.W. Moore

Men's Rinks/Fours

- Canada - Silver
  - Harry J. Allen
  - Jimmy Campbell
  - Mitch Thomas
  - W. "Billy" Rae

== Rowing ==
Men's Coxed Fours

- Canada - Silver
  - A. Miles
  - D.L. Gales
  - H.R. McCuaig
  - J.A. Butler
  - R.S. Evans

Men's Coxless Fours

- Canada - Silver
  - J. Gayner
  - J. Fleming
  - Albert Bellew
  - Henry Pelham

Men's Double Sculls

- Canada - Gold
  - Boles
  - Richards

Men's Eight Oared Shell

- Canada - Bronze
  - A. Taylor
  - D. Doal
  - E. Eastwood
  - F. Fry
  - J. Zabinsky
  - L. Bawks
  - L. McDonald
  - W. Moore
  - W. Thorburn

== Swimming ==
Men's 100 Yards Freestyle

- F. Munro Bourne - Gold, 56.00 s
- Albert Gibson - Bronze

Men's 440 Yards Freestyle

- George Burleigh - Bronze

Men's 1 500 Yards Freestyle

- George Burleigh - Bronze

Men's 220 Yards Breaststroke

- Jack Aubin - Gold, 2 min 35.40 s

Women's 4 x 100 Yards Freestyle Relay

- Canada - Silver, 4 min 33.0 s
  - Elizabeth "Betty" Edwards
  - Irene Pirie-Milton
  - Marjorie Linton
  - Peggy Bailey

Men's 4 x 200 Yards Freestyle Relay

- Canada - Gold, 8 min 42.40 s
  - B. Gibson
  - F. Munro Bourne
  - George Burleigh
  - Jimmy Thompson

== Wrestling ==
Men's Bantamweight Division (57 kg)

- James Trifunov - Gold

Men's Featherweight Division (62 kg)

- Clifford Chilcott - Gold

Men's Lightweight Division (68 kg)

- Howard Thomas - Gold

Men's Welterweight Division (74 kg)

- Reg Priestly - Gold

Men's Middleweight Division (82 kg)

- Mike Chepwick - Gold

Men's Light Heavyweight Division (90 kg)

- L. McIntyre - Gold

Men's Heavyweight Division (100 kg)

- Earl McCready - Gold

== See also ==
- Canada at the Commonwealth Games
