= Thomas Scott (diver) =

English diver

Personal information
- Nationality: British (English)
- Born: 1907 Atherton, Greater Manchester, England

Sport
- Sport: Diving
- Event: 10 metre platform
- Club: Oldham Police
Medal record
Men's diving
Representing England
British Empire Games
Bronze medal – third place	1930 Hamilton	10 m platform

Thomas Scott (1907 - date of death unknown) was an English diver, who competed at the British Empire Games (now Commonwealth Games).

== Biography ==
Scott began swimming at the Atherton Club and won the Lancashire Junior 100 yards freestyle in 1923 and 1924 and swam for Great Britain at the 1927 European Aquatics Championships in the 100m freestyle.

Scott competed for the 1930 English team in the 10 metre platform event at the 1930 British Empire Games in Hamilton, Ontario, Canada. At the time of the 1930 Games he was a police officer.

He performed diving displays and exhibitions in the North of England. He also played water polo for Oldham Police and Derby and his brother Walter Scott was also a notable diver.
