= Wales at the 1930 British Empire Games =

- CGF code: WAL
- CGA: Wales at the Commonwealth Games
- Website: teamwales.cymru

in Hamilton, Ontario, Canada
- Medals Ranked 7th: Gold 0 Silver 2 Bronze 1 Total 3

British Empire Games appearances
- 1930; 1934; 1938; 1950; 1954; 1958; 1962; 1966; 1970; 1974; 1978; 1982; 1986; 1990; 1994; 1998; 2002; 2006; 2010; 2014; 2018; 2022; 2026; 2030

Flag of Wales until 1953

Wales at the 1930 British Empire Games (abbreviated WAL) was the first appearance of the country at the inaugural games. Wales has competed in every edition of the Commonwealth Games. In the first edition at Hamilton, Ontario, from 16 to 23 August 1930, just 11 teams took part and of them, 5 other countries have also competed in every edition since then.

Wales came 7th overall in the games, with 2 silver medals and 1 bronze, with all three medals were won by the female swimmer Valerie Davies.

Only the Welsh Amateur Swimming Association sent a team and an athletics team was not sent to the games. This was probably due to the structure of Welsh athletics at the time. Various English regional associations governed the sport in Wales with no Welsh national association in existence. Reg Thomas, the 1930 Welsh 880 yards and 1 mile champion, competed as a member of the English team. He won the mile and placed second in the 880yds.

== Individual medallists ==
Medal	Name	Sport	Event
Silver	Valerie Davies	Swimming	Women's 100 Yards Backstroke
Silver	Valerie Davies	Swimming	Women's 440 Yards Freestyle
Bronze	Valerie Davies	Swimming	Women's 100 Yards Freestyle

== Team ==
=== Swimming ===
Athlete	Sport	Events	Medals/ref
Valerie Davies	swimming	100y/400y freestyle, 100 yd backstroke	,,
Paul Radmilovic	swimming	unknown	
