= Stanley Bell =

English swimmer

Personal information
- Nationality: (England) English
- Born: Jul/Aug 1907

Sport
- Sport: Swimming
- Event: 220 Yard Breaststroke
Medal record
British Empire Games
Silver medal – second place	1930 Hamilton	200 yd breast stroke

Stanley Bell (Jul/Aug 1907 (Note: The Civil Registration Birth Index for England and Wales lists only one person by the name of Stanley Bell who was born in Birkenhead, 1907. He is listed being born in the third quarter of the year.) – date of death unknown) was an English swimmer from Birkenhead, Cheshire. He won a silver medal at the 1930 British Empire Games in the 200 yard breast-stroke and was also noted in 1930 as holding the title for the Northern Championships. In September 1930, he beat the British record for the 200-yard breast stroke and beat that record a year later.

== Swimming ==
Bell's first distinction in swimming came in 1923 when he became the breast-stroke champion of the Northern Juniors.

He competed in the 220 Yard Breaststroke at the 1930 British Empire Games for England in Hamilton, Ontario, where he won a silver medal in a time of 2:39.6. During the trials in May, he put up the "best effort" when making his debut in front of a southern audience and covered the 200 yard breast-stroke in a time of 2:45. He was one of five men from the north of England to compete at the games, although at this time was residing in Slough and was described as the holding the Northern Championship title. Reports suggested that he "showed easily the best time" in the 200 yards (180 m) breast-stroke.

In September 1930, he won his first national championship in a "remarkably easy fashion", when he out-swam the French and Yorkshire champions respectively at Leyton. Bell's coach, W.W Goalen from Birkenhead, also relocated to London and was the first to congratulate Bell on his success. Bell had taken residence in London since January 1930 and since doing so had "improved consistently", with reports that he was in contention to establish a new British record in breast-stroke when he would aim to beat R Flint's time of 2:38. He successfully beat the record on 26 September, which had been held since 1927 to become the English champion. Bell beat his own record a year later in September 1931, when he covered the 200 yard breast stroke in a time of 2 minutes and 36 seconds at the South Norwood Baths.

The Liverpool Echo noted that his rise to fame would not be a surprise in the north of the country, with a belief that he would be capable of beating the new record he set with the right opportunity. Despite living in Slough, he was not eligible to compete in the 1930 Southern championships as Slough is in Buckinghamshire, a district in the midlands; he had entered the competition prior to realising this and his entry was voided. In December 1930, he competed in a 200 metres (660 ft) contest held in Paris, where he was outperformed by F. Cartonnet of France, having been ahead for the first seven laps.

In 1933, he led the Penguin Swimming Club at Shepherd's Bush swimming baths to an "easy victory" in a team race against Oxford University swimming club, which included Canadian Olympic swimmer Munroe Bourne. In the 1934 220-yard breast stroke championships at Devonport, Plymouth, Bell narrowly missed out becoming the champion, being beat into second place by N. Hamilton of Glasgow.

== Personal life ==
He declared his profession as an engineer at the time of the 1930 Games, when he resided in Slough, Buckinghamshire.
