= Cissie Stewart =

Scottish swimmer (1911-2008)

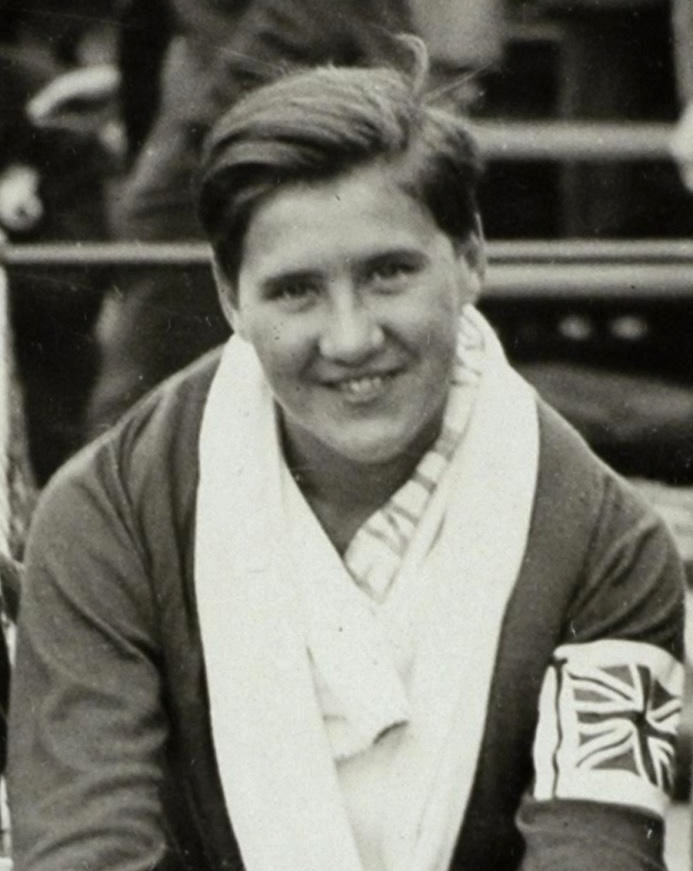
- Cissie Stewart at the 1928 Summer Olympics

Personal information
- Nationality: British (Scottish)
- Born: 19 July 1911 Dundee, Scotland
- Died: 8 January 2008 (aged 96) Troon, Scotland

Sport
- Sport: Swimming
- Club: Dundee Belmont
Medal record
Representing Great Britain
Olympic Games
Silver medal – second place	1928 Amsterdam	4×100 m freestyle
Representing Scotland
British Empire Games
Bronze medal – third place	1930 Hamilton	400 yd freestyle
Bronze medal – third place	1930 Hamilton	4×100 yd freestyle

Sarah Gillow Marshall "Cissie" Stewart (19 July 1911 – 8 January 2008), later known by her married name Sarah Hunt, was a Scottish swimmer who competed and won a silver medal at the 1928 Summer Olympics.

== Early life ==
Stewart was from Dundee, the daughter of footballer William Stewart. She was a member of the Dundee Belmont Swimming Club.

== Swimming career ==
At the 1928 Summer Olympics in Amsterdam, Cissie Stewart won a silver medal in the Women's 4×100-metre freestyle relay event and was fourth in the Women's 400-metre freestyle event. Her Olympic teammates were Joyce Cooper, Ellen King, Jean McDowell, and Vera Tanner.

Stewart placed second in the 1929 national 440-yard freestyle championship, at Bristol. She also competed for Scotland at the 1930 British Empire Games and the 1934 British Empire Games, and won a bronze medal in the 4×100-yard freestyle relay.

== Personal life ==
At the time of the 1930 Games she was living at 57 Budhope Street in Dundee and was a shop assistant by profession.

Stewart married a journalist, Bill Hunt, in Walkerville, Ontario in 1930; she smuggled her wedding dress into her luggage for the Commonwealth Games in nearby Hamilton, and the couple eloped immediately after the event. She moved to Glasgow as a newlywed. She died at a nursing home in Troon in 2008, aged 96 years.

== See also ==
- List of Olympic medalists in swimming (women)
