= Harry Hedges =

English middle-distance runner

Personal information
- Nationality: British (English)
- Born: 16 June 1908 Linslade, Buckinghamshire, England
- Died: 1995 Ampthill, Bedfordshire, England

Sport
- Sport: Athletics
- Event: Middle-distance
- Club: South London Harriers

Hubert William Hedges (16 June 1908 – 1995) was an English athlete who competed at the 1930 British Empire Games.

== Biography ==
Hedges was born in Linslade, Buckinghamshire, England and was a member of the South London Harriers.

He represented the England team against Scotland in July 1930 before being selected for the England team for the 1930 Empire Games in Hamilton, Ontario. where he finished in 9th place in the 1 mile event.

After the Games, Hedges continued to race for South London Harriers and remained a leading mile runner for several years.
