= Bill Trippett =

English swimmer (1909–2002)

Personal information
- Nationality: British (English)
- Born: 14 July 1909 Yorkshire, England
- Died: 2002 Derbyshire, England

Sport
- Sport: Swimming
- Event: 100 Yard Backstroke
Medal record
Men's swimming
Representing England
British Empire Games
Gold medal – first place	1930 Hamilton	100y backstroke

James William Trippett (14 July 1909 – 2002) was an English swimmer who won a gold medal at the British Empire Games (now Commonwealth Games).

== Biography ==
Trippett was educated at Pye Bank School, learned to swim aged 12 and joined Sheffield City police aged 19. He missed out on a place at the 1924 Summer Olympics after finishing fourth in the trial that saw only three progress. He held the Yorkshire 150 yards backstroke title for 12 successive years.

Trippett competed for the 1930 English team in the 100 yards backstroke event at the 1930 British Empire Games in Hamilton, Ontario, Canada.

He was a police constable at the time of the 1930 Games and lived in Sheffield. He also participated at the 1934 British Empire Games.

In 1970 he was the Chairman of Derby County Council.
