= Joseph Whiteside =

British swimmer

Personal information
- National team: Great Britain
- Born: 4 August 1906 Bolton, England
- Died: 11 October 1990 (aged 84) Manchester, England

Sport
- Sport: Swimming
- Strokes: Freestyle
- Club: South Manchester SC
Medal record
Men's swimming
Representing England
British Empire Games
Silver medal – second place	1930 Hamilton	4×200 yd freestyle

Joseph Whiteside (4 August 1906 – 11 October 1990) was an English competition swimmer who represented Great Britain in the Olympics, and England in the British Empire Games, during the late 1920s and early 1930s. White competed in freestyle swimming events.

== Biography ==
Whiteside was born in Bolton, England, and swam for the South Manchester Swimming Club.

At the 1928 Summer Olympics in Amsterdam, Netherlands, he was a member of the British men's team that finished sixth in the 4×200-metre freestyle relay. Four years later at the 1932 Summer Olympics in Los Angeles, he finished fifth with the British team in the 4×200-metre freestyle relay. In the 100 metre freestyle contest he was eliminated in the first round.

Whiteside competed for the 1930 English team in the 4×200-yard freestyle relay competition at the 1930 British Empire Games in Hamilton, Ontario, Canada, where he won the silver medal.

== See also ==
- List of Commonwealth Games medallists in swimming (men)
