= Roger Close-Brooks =

English rower (1906–1980)

Personal information
- Nationality: British (English)
- Born: 2 November 1906 Prestbury, Cheshire, England
- Died: 17 May 1980 Southampton, England

Sport
- Sport: Rowing
- Event: Eights
- Club: London RC
Medal record
Men's Rowing
Representing England
British Empire Games
| Gold medal – first place | 1930 Hamilton | Eights |

Roger Close-Brooks DSO (2 November 1906 – 17 May 1980) was an English rower. He competed in the eights at the 1930 British Empire Games for England and won a gold medal.

== Biography ==
He was educated at Harrow School and Trinity College, Cambridge.

He competed for the 1930 English team in the eights event at the 1930 British Empire Games in Hamilton, Ontario, Canada and won a gold medal.

He was a stockbroker's clerk at the time of the 1930 Games.

In 1934, he married Marian, second daughter of Gerald Beesly, J.P. and Helen (née Chamberlain), who was a cousin of Neville Chamberlain. Marian was the sister of rower Richard Beesly (1907–1965), who won an Olympic gold medal at the 1928 Summer Olympics; and writer Patrick Beesly.

On 24 May 1940 he was promoted to 2nd Lt of the King's Shropshire Light Infantry and during World War II in 1944 was awarded the Distinguished Service Order.
