= Jean McDowell =

Scottish swimmer (1908–2000)

Personal information
- Nationality: British (Scottish)
- Born: 22 September 1908 Edinburgh, Scotland
- Died: 2 February 2000 (aged 91) Edinburgh, Scotland

Sport
- Sport: Swimming
- Club: Warrender Baths Club
Medal record
Representing Scotland
British Empire Games
Bronze medal – third place	1930 Hamilton	4×100 yd freestyle
Bronze medal – third place	1934 London	100 yd freestyle
Bronze medal – third place	1934 London	3×110 yd medley
Representing Great Britain
European Championships
Silver medal – second place	1931 Paris	4×100 m freestyle

Jean Hunter McDowell (later Burnett, 22 September 1908 – 2 February 2000) was a Scottish freestyle swimmer who competed for Great Britain in the 1928 Summer Olympics.

== Biography ==
In 1928 she finished fourth in the 100 metre freestyle event.

Two years later she won the bronze medal with the Scottish team in the 4×100 yards freestyle competition at the 1930 British Empire Games with Cissie Stewart, Ellen King and Jessie McVey. At the Aquatics at the 1934 British Empire Games she won the bronze medal in the 100 yards freestyle contest as well as a bronze medal with the Scottish team in the 3×110 yards medley event (with Margot Hamilton and Margaret McCullum). She won a silver medal at the 1931 European Aquatics Championships as part of the 4×100 metres freestyle relay (with Valerie Davies, Phyllis Harding, and Joyce Cooper). At the time of the 1930 Games she was living at 12 Comely Bank Street in Edinburgh and was a stenographer by profession.

In Scotland she swam for Warrender Baths Club where she won five Scottish Swimming championships. She lived for many years in North Berwick, east of Edinburgh, and became President of the Scottish Ladies' Golfing Association and Chairman of the British Ladies Golf Union.
