= Reginald Flint =

British swimmer (1903–1981)

Personal information
- Born: 16 July 1903 Sheffield, England
- Died: 19 June 1981 (aged 77) Sheffield, England

Sport
- Sport: Swimming
- Strokes: Breaststroke
- Club: Croft House SC
Medal record
Men's swimming
Representing England
British Empire Games
Bronze medal – third place	1930 Hamilton	200 yd breaststroke

Reginald Flint (16 July 1903 – 19 June 1981) was an English competitive swimmer and breaststroker who represented Great Britain in the 1924 Summer Olympics and 1928 Summer Olympics, and England in the 1930 British Empire Games.

== Biography ==
Flint was born in Sheffield and swam for the Croft House Swimming Club and was a dental technician. He was also known as Reggie Flint during his swimming days.

In 1924 he was eliminated in the semi-finals of the 200-metre breaststroke event. Four years later he was eliminated in the first round of the 200-metre breaststroke competition at the 1928 Olympics.

He won the bronze medal for the 1930 English team in the 200-yard breaststroke contest at the 1930 British Empire Games in Hamilton, Ontario, Canada.

== See also ==
- List of Commonwealth Games medallists in swimming (men)
