= Athletics at the 1930 British Empire Games – Men's 1 mile =

Men's 1 mile at the 1930 British Empire Games
- Venue: Civic Stadium
- Date: 23 August 1930
- Winning time: 4:14.0

Medalists
gold medal	Reg Thomas	England
silver medal	William Whyte	Australia
bronze medal	Jerry Cornes	England

The men's 1 mile event at the 1930 British Empire Games was held on 23 August at the Civic Stadium in Hamilton, Canada.

== Results ==
Rank	Name	Nationality	Time	Notes
1st place, gold medalist(s)	Reg Thomas	England	4:14.0	
2nd place, silver medalist(s)	William Whyte	Australia	4:17.0e	+15 yd
3rd place, bronze medalist(s)	Jerry Cornes	England	?:??.?	
4	Jack Walters	Canada	?:??.?	
5	Phil Edwards	British Guiana	?:??.?	
6	Robert Sutherland	Scotland	?:??.?	
7	Russell McDougall	Australia	?:??.?	
8	Stuart Townend	England	?:??.?	
9	Harry Hedges	England	?:??.?	
