= Ellen King =

Scottish swimmer (1909–1994)

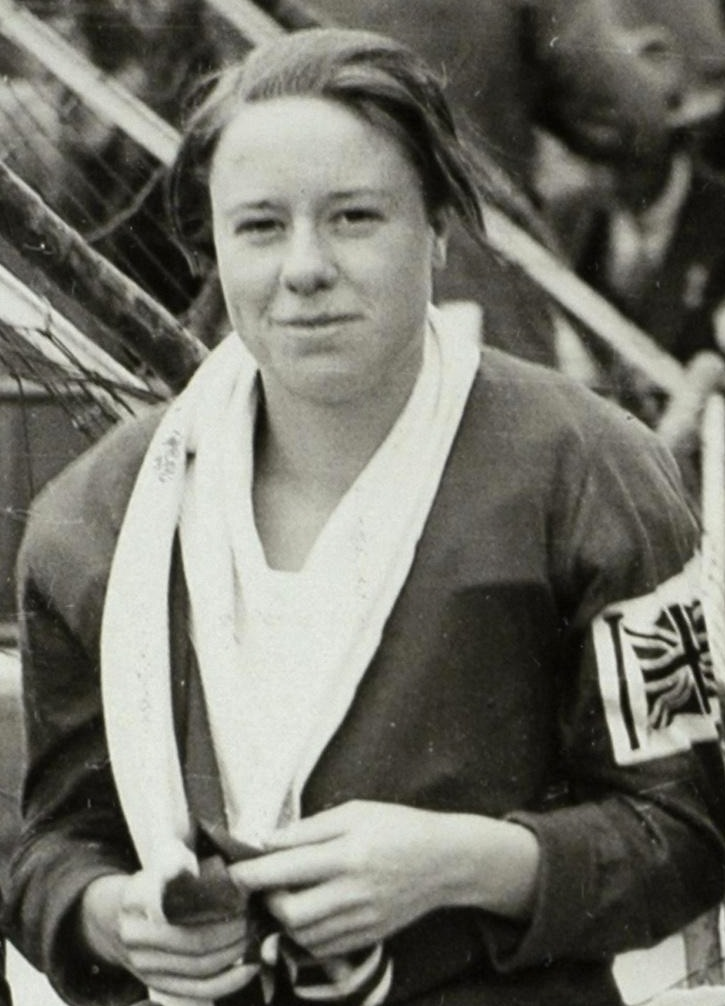
- King in 1928

Personal information
- Nationality: British (Scottish)
- Born: 16 January 1909 Renfrew, Scotland
- Died: 3 February 1994 (aged 85) Parkgate, England

Sport
- Sport: Swimming
- Strokes: Backstroke, breaststroke, freestyle
- Club: Warrender Baths Club
Medal record
Women's swimming
Representing Great Britain
Olympic Games
Silver medal – second place	1928 Amsterdam	100 m backstroke
Silver medal – second place	1928 Amsterdam	4×100 m freestyle
European Championships
Gold medal – first place	1927 Bologna	4×100 m freestyle
Representing Scotland
British Empire Games
Silver medal – second place	1930 Hamilton	100 yd freestyle
Bronze medal – third place	1930 Hamilton	220 yd breaststroke
Bronze medal – third place	1930 Hamilton	4×100 yd freestyle

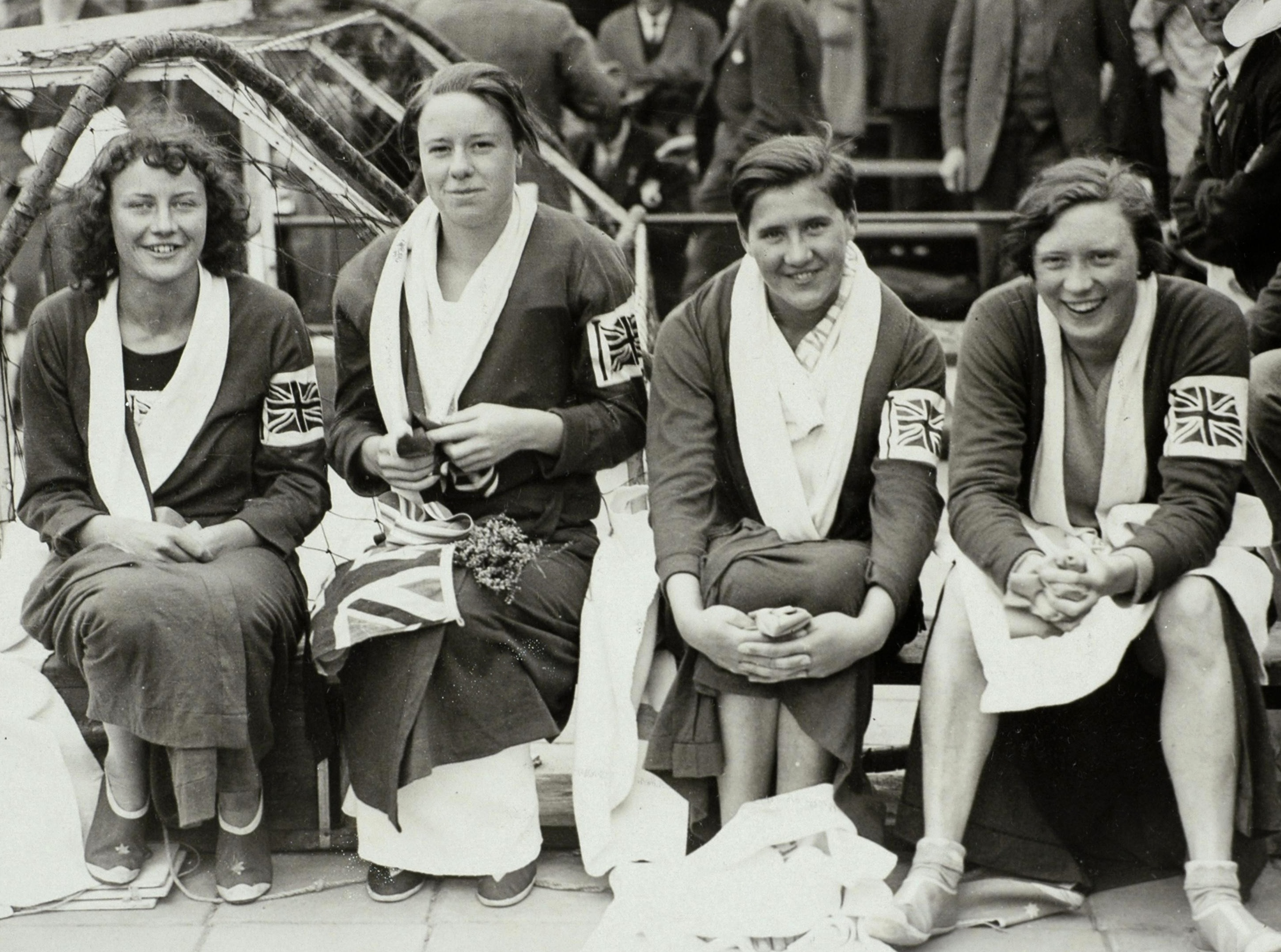
British women 4 × 100 m team at the 1928 Olympics, King is second from left

Ellen Elizabeth King (16 January 1909 – 3 February 1994) was a Scottish competitive swimmer who represented Great Britain twice in the Olympics, and Scotland at the inaugural British Empire Games. King was a versatile swimmer, and competed in various backstroke, breaststroke, freestyle swimming events.

== Biography ==
As a 15-year-old at the 1924 Summer Olympics in Paris, although ill, she competed in the semi-finals of the 100-metre backstroke and finished with the seventh best time overall. At 15, she was the youngest member of the British team.

Four years later at the 1928 Summer Olympics in Amsterdam, King won two silver medals. She won the first medal as a member of the British women's team in the 4×100-metre freestyle relay, together with her teammates Joyce Cooper, Cissie Stewart and Iris Tanner, coming second behind the American women. In individual competition, she won her second silver in the 100-metre backstroke, finishing second behind Dutch swimmer Marie Braun and ahead of British teammate Joyce Cooper. King had set a new world record in her semi-final heat, only to have it broken by Braun in her own qualifying heat.

In the late 1920s King set world records in the 150-yard and 220-yard breaststroke.

At the inaugural 1930 British Empire Games in Hamilton, Ontario, Canada, she won a silver medal in the 100-yard freestyle and a bronze medal in the 200-yard breaststroke. As a member of the Scottish relay team with Jean McDowell, Cissie Stewart, and Jessie McVey, she won her second bronze medal in the 4×100-yard freestyle competition. On the journey to Canada, on board ship, she maintained her fitness by using a punchball. At the time of the Games she was living at 49 Warrender Park Road in Edinburgh.

Ellen King attended James Gillespie's High School, swam for the Warrender Baths Club in Scotland and was a swimming teacher at Edinburgh schools for 40 years until her retirement in 1974. In 1928, she established the Zenith Ladies Amateur Swimming Club in response to the constraints imposed on her by male administrators who did not provide her or other female swimmers in the club enough opportunities to compete. In 2002, she was inducted into the Scottish Sports Hall of Fame.

== See also ==
- List of Olympic medalists in swimming (women)
