= John Besford =

British swimmer (1911–1993)

Personal information
- Born: 30 January 1911 Chorlton-cum-Hardy, England
- Died: 26 February 1993 (aged 82) Spain

Sport
- Sport: Swimming
- Strokes: Backstroke
Medal record
Men's swimming
Representing Great Britain
European Championships - Long Course
Gold medal – first place	1934 Magdeburg	100 m backstroke
Representing England
British Empire Games
Silver medal – second place	1934 London	100 yd backstroke
Bronze medal – third place	1930 Hamilton	100 yd backstroke
Bronze medal – third place	1934 London	3×100 yd medley

John Charles Preston Besford, OBE (30 January 1911 – 26 February 1993) was an English competitive swimmer who represented Great Britain in the Olympics and European championships, and England in the British Empire Games, during the 1930s. Besford competed primarily in the backstroke.

== Biography ==
Besford was born in Chorlton-cum-Hardy, Lancashire, England. He studied dentistry at The University of Manchester,

Besford competed in the 1928 Summer Olympics where he finished sixth in the 100-metre backstroke and competed for the 1930 English team in the 100 yd backstroke event at the 1930 British Empire Games in Hamilton, Ontario, Canada, winning a bronze medal.

Besford was European 100-metre backstroke champion in 1934 and won the silver medal for England at the 1934 British Empire Games in London, both in the 100-yard backstroke event. In 1934 he was also a member of the English team which won the bronze medal in the medley relay contest. Four years later he was eliminated in the semi-finals of the 100-metre backstroke.

After serving as an officer in World War II, he taught dentistry at the University of Beijing, China. He later spent time in Yokohama, Japan, before returning to the UK to operate a dental practice in Brighton. He was appointed to the Order of the British Empire (OBE) in the 1975 New Year's Honours List for services to the British community of Tokyo.

He died in Spain.

== See also ==
- List of Commonwealth Games medallists in swimming (men)
