= Robert Thompson (water polo) =

Canadian water polo player

Personal information
- Born: June 11, 1947 (age 79) Hamilton, Ontario, Canada
- Height: 1.78 m (5 ft 10 in)
- Weight: 64 kg (141 lb)

Sport
- Sport: Water polo

Robert Thompson (born June 11, 1947) is a retired Canadian water polo player and coach. He competed at the 1972 Olympics in Munich where his team finished in 16th place. He was one of the unsuspecting athletes who helped the Munich massacre terrorists to climb over the fence into the Olympic Village.

Thompson was born in a swimming family – his father James and elder sister Patty were Olympic swimmers and coaches – and started training in swimming at four years of age. He later changed to water polo, and already by 1961 competed at the national level. He was a member of the national teams that competed at the 1967 and 1971 Pan American Games and 1972 Olympics. In 1969 he started coaching water polo and later prepared the Canadian team for the 1980 and 1984 Olympics and 1983 Pan American Games. For his coaching achievements he was inducted into the McMaster University Hall of Fame in 1989 and into the Ontario Aquatic Hall of Fame in 1995.
