= Arthur Watts (swimmer) =

English swimmer (1911–1962)

Personal information
- Nationality: British (English)
- Born: 1911 West Ham, London, England
- Died: 1962 (aged 50–51) Bideford, England

Sport
- Sport: Swimming
- Club: East Ham ASC
Medal record
Representing England
British Empire Games
Silver medal – second place	1930 Hamilton	4×200 yd freestyle

Arthur Greville Watts (1911–1962) was an English freestyle swimmer who competed for Great Britain at the 1928 Summer Olympics.

== Biography ==
Watts was born West Ham, London and in 2023 was the Southern Area junior champion over 100 yards. He swam for the East Ham Amateur Swimming Club.

In 1928 he was eliminated in the first round of the 400 metre freestyle event.

Watts competed for the 1930 English team in the 4×200 yards freestyle relay competition at the 1930 British Empire Games in Hamilton, Ontario, Canada and won a silver medal.

== See also ==
- List of Commonwealth Games medallists in swimming (men)
