= Olive Wadham =

British swimmer

Personal information
- Nationality: British (English)
- Born: March 23, 1909 Christchurch, England
- Died: October 20, 2004 (aged 95) Bournemouth, England

Sport
- Sport: Swimming
- Club: Bournemouth SC
Medal record
Representing England
British Empire Games
Gold medal – first place	1930 Hamilton	4×100 yd freestyle
Representing Great Britain
European Championships
Bronze medal – third place	1938 London	4×100 m freestyle

Olive Louise Wadham (née Joynes, 23 March 1909 – 20 October 2004) was an English freestyle swimmer who competed for Great Britain at the 1936 Summer Olympics.

== Biography ==
Wadham was born in Christchurch, Hampshire.

She competed for the 1930 English team and won a gold medal in the 4×100 yards freestyle relay event at the 1930 British Empire Games in Hamilton, Ontario, Canada.

In 1936 she was a member of the British relay team which finished sixth in the 4×100 metre freestyle relay event. In the 100 metre freestyle competition she was eliminated in the semifinals.

She died in Bournemouth.
