= Jenny Kastein =

Dutch swimmer (1913–2000)

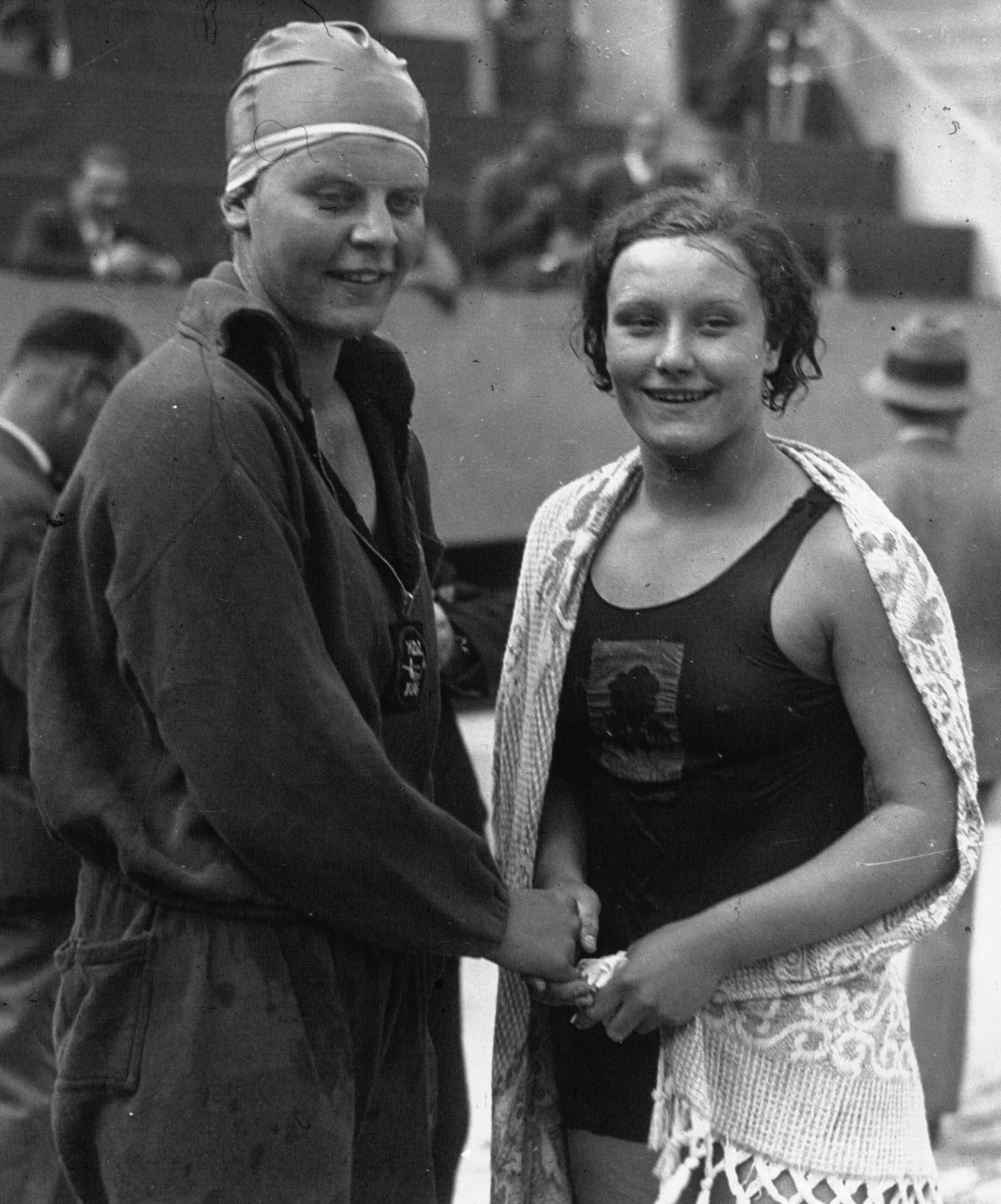
- Jenny Kastein (left) and Cecelia Wolstenholme at the 1931 European Championships

Personal information
- Born: 24 January 1913 Amsterdam, the Netherlands
- Died: 20 October 2000 (aged 87) Zwolle, the Netherlands

Sport
- Sport: Swimming
- Club: HDZ, Amsterdam
Medal record
Representing the Netherlands
European Championships
Silver medal – second place	1931 Paris	200 m breaststroke

Jeannette "Jenny" Hermine Kastein (24 January 1913 – 20 October 2000) was a Dutch breaststroke swimmer. She won a silver medal in the 200 m breaststroke at the 1931 European Championships, behind Cecelia Wolstenholme. Next year she set four world records in the 400 m and 500 m breastroke (unofficial events), but could not compete in the Olympics due to the overall financial problems related to the Great Depression. She won the national titles in the 200 m in 1933, 1935 and 1936, yet her performance declined, and at the 1936 Summer Olympics she finished in a mere seventh place.

In 1942, Kastein married Evert Heleonardus Scheijde, a physician; they had two sons.
