= Jimmy Thompson Memorial Swimming Pool =

Sports venue in Ontario, Canada

Jimmy Thompson Memorial Pool
- Interactive map of Jimmy Thompson Memorial Pool
- Former names: Hamilton Municipal Pool
- Location: 1099 King St E, Hamilton, Ontario, Canada
- Coordinates: 43°14′57.2″N 79°49′49.0″W
- Owner: City of Hamilton

Construction
- Groundbreaking: 1928
- Opened: 1930

Tenant
- 1930 British Empire Games

The Jimmy Thompson Memorial Pool, formerly the Hamilton Municipal Pool is a swimming pool in Hamilton, Ontario, Canada. It opened in January 1930 and hosted the swimming and diving events at the 1930 British Empire Games.

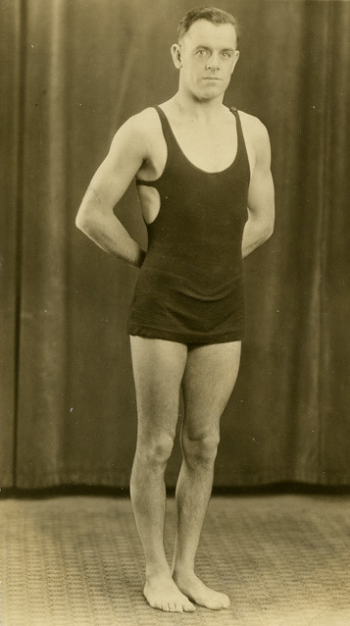
Jimmy Thompson

The pool was built by J Earle Smith and designed by E. H. Darling for the 1930 British Empire Games and was known as the Hamilton Municipal Pool. It held the Aquatics at the 1930 British Empire Games, which consisted of swimming and diving events.

After the Games it was used by the Hamilton Aquatic Club. In 1971, was renamed the Jimmy Thompson Memorial Pool in honour of Jimmy Thompson, a former Olympian and head coach at the Hamilton Aquatic Club for over 30 years.

In 2021, the site was designated as being of cultural heritage value under the Ontario Heritage Act. It is the last surviving structure of the 1930 British Empire Games.
