= Marjorie Linton =

Canadian swimmer (1917–1994)

Personal information
- Full name: Marjorie Edith Linton
- National team: Canada
- Born: May 20, 1917 Toronto, Ontario, Canada
- Died: December 6, 1994 (aged 77)
- Height: 1.95 m (6 ft 5 in)
- Weight: 83 kg (183 lb)

Sport
- Sport: Swimming
- Strokes: Backstroke, freestyle
Medal record
Women's swimming
Representing Canada
British Empire Games
Silver medal – second place	1930 Hamilton	4×100 yd freestyle

Marjorie Edith Linton (May 20, 1917 – December 6, 1994), later known by her married name Marjorie McCloskey, was a Canadian backstroke and freestyle swimmer who competed in the 1932 Summer Olympics in Los Angeles. In the 1932 Olympics, she was eliminated in the first round of the 100-metre backstroke as well as of the 100-metre freestyle. At the 1930 British Empire Games in Hamilton, at the age of 13, she was a member of the Canadian relay team which won the silver medal in the 4×100-yard freestyle relay.
