= James Thompson (swimmer) =

Canadian swimmer

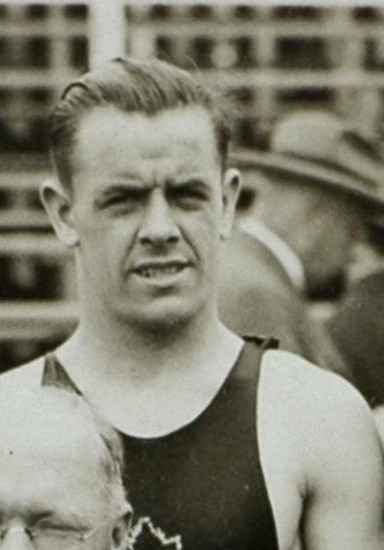
- James Thompson in 1928

Personal information
- Full name: James Gilmour Thompson
- Nicknames: "Jimmy", "Mr. Swimming"
- National team: Canada
- Born: January 20, 1906 Dundee, Scotland
- Died: January 26, 1966 (aged 60)

Sport
- Sport: Swimming
- Strokes: Freestyle
- Club: Toronto West End YMCA
Medal record
Men's swimming
Representing Canada
Olympic Games
Bronze medal – third place	1928 Amsterdam	4×200 m freestyle
British Empire Games
Gold medal – first place	1930 Hamilton	4×200 yd freestyle

James Gilmour Thompson (January 20, 1906 – January 26, 1966) was a Scottish-born Canadian freestyle swimmer who won a bronze medal in the 4×200-metre freestyle relay at the 1928 Summer Olympics in Amsterdam; he also competed in the 400-metre and 1500-metre freestyle events, but failed to reach the finals. Two years later he won a gold medal in the 4×200-yard freestyle relay at the 1930 British Empire Games.

Thompson was born in Scotland and in the early 1920s moved to Canada, where he started training in swimming at the Toronto YMCA club. In 1928 the Canadian Olympic Committee selected him for the Olympics as a fourth team member, but could sponsor only three swimmers. Thompson, a machinist by profession, had modest incomes and had to seek sponsors to attend the Games. Later he initiated a government-sponsored swimming program for poor, and between 1932 and 1966 worked as the head coach of the Hamilton Aquatic Club. He was named Hamilton's Citizen of the Year in 1959, Canada's Swimming Coach of the Year in 1964, and was inducted into the Hamilton Sports and Ontario Aquatic Halls of Fame. Hamilton's Jimmy Thompson Memorial Swimming Pool carried his name. He died of cancer in 1966.

His daughter Patty also became Olympic swimmer in Tokyo in 1964. His son Robert competed at 1972 and 1984 Olympic Games in water polo.

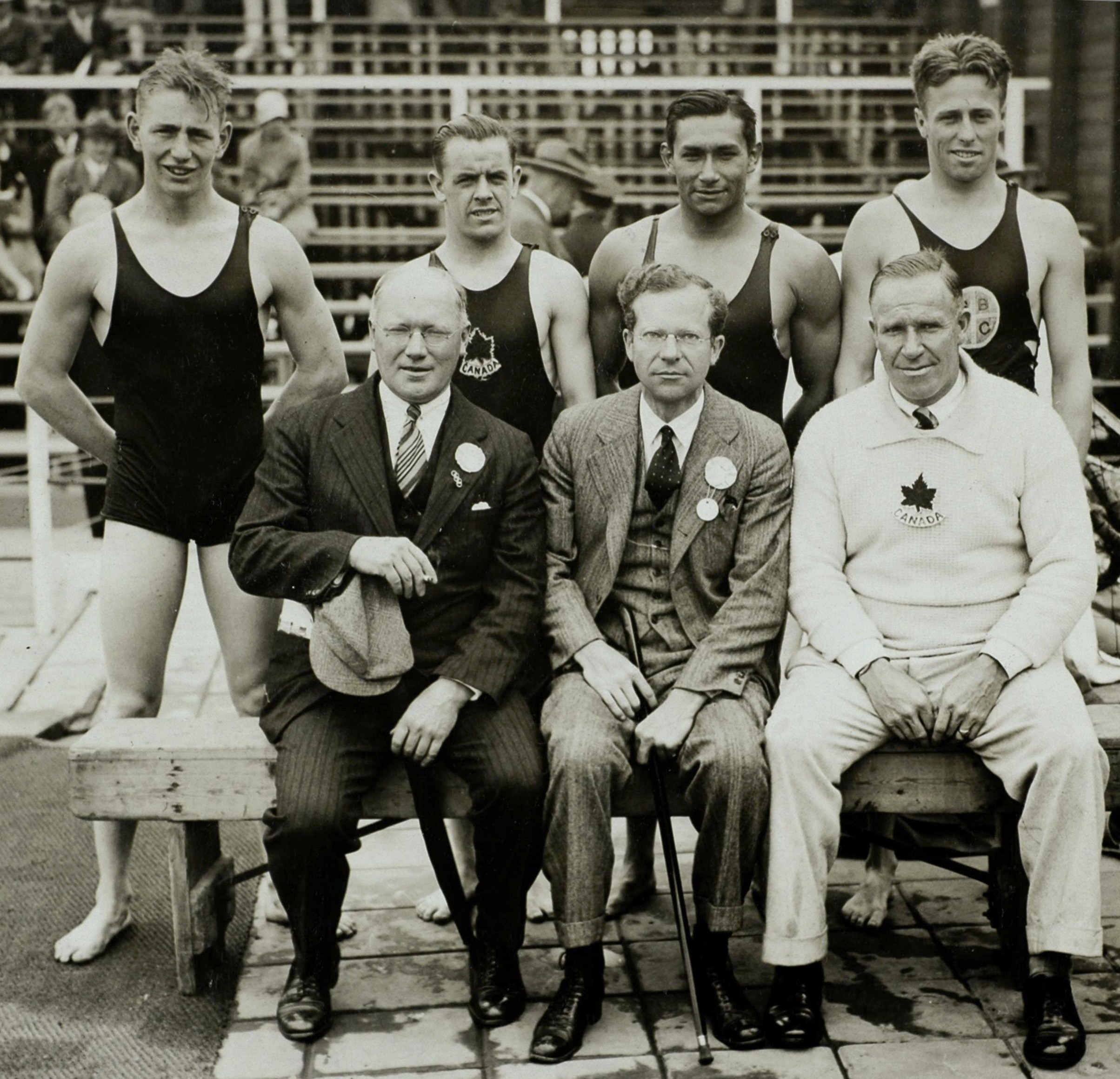
Canadian 4 × 200 m team at the 1928 Olympics, Thompson is second from left

== See also ==
- List of Commonwealth Games medallists in swimming (men)
- List of Olympic medalists in swimming (men)
