= Betty Tancock =

Canadian swimmer

Personal information
- Full name: Elizabeth Alberta Tancock
- Nickname: "Betty"
- National team: Canada
- Born: February 2, 1911 Toronto, Ontario, Canada
- Died: May 28, 2009 (aged 98) Toronto, Ontario

Sport
- Sport: Swimming
- Strokes: Freestyle
- Club: University of Toronto; Women's Swim Club
Medal record
Women's swimming
Representing Canada
British Empire Games
Silver medal – second place	1930 Hamilton	4x100 yd freestyle

Elizabeth Alberta Tancock (February 22, 1911 – May 28, 2009), née Elizabeth Alberta Edwards, was a Canadian swimmer who competed in the Olympic Games in 1932 in Los Angeles.

== Biography ==
In 1932, she was a member of the Canadian relay team that finished fourth in the 4x100-metre freestyle relay. In the 400-metre freestyle, she was eliminated in the first round. She also represented Canada in the 1930 and 1934 British Empire Games. Tancock was inducted as a member of the University of Toronto Sports Hall of Fame in 1990. From 1962 to 1980 Tancock worked at administration at York University in Toronto. At the time of her death at the age of 98, on May 28, 2009, Tancock was believed to be Canada's oldest living Olympic competitor.
