= Cecelia Wolstenholme =

English swimmer (1915–1968)

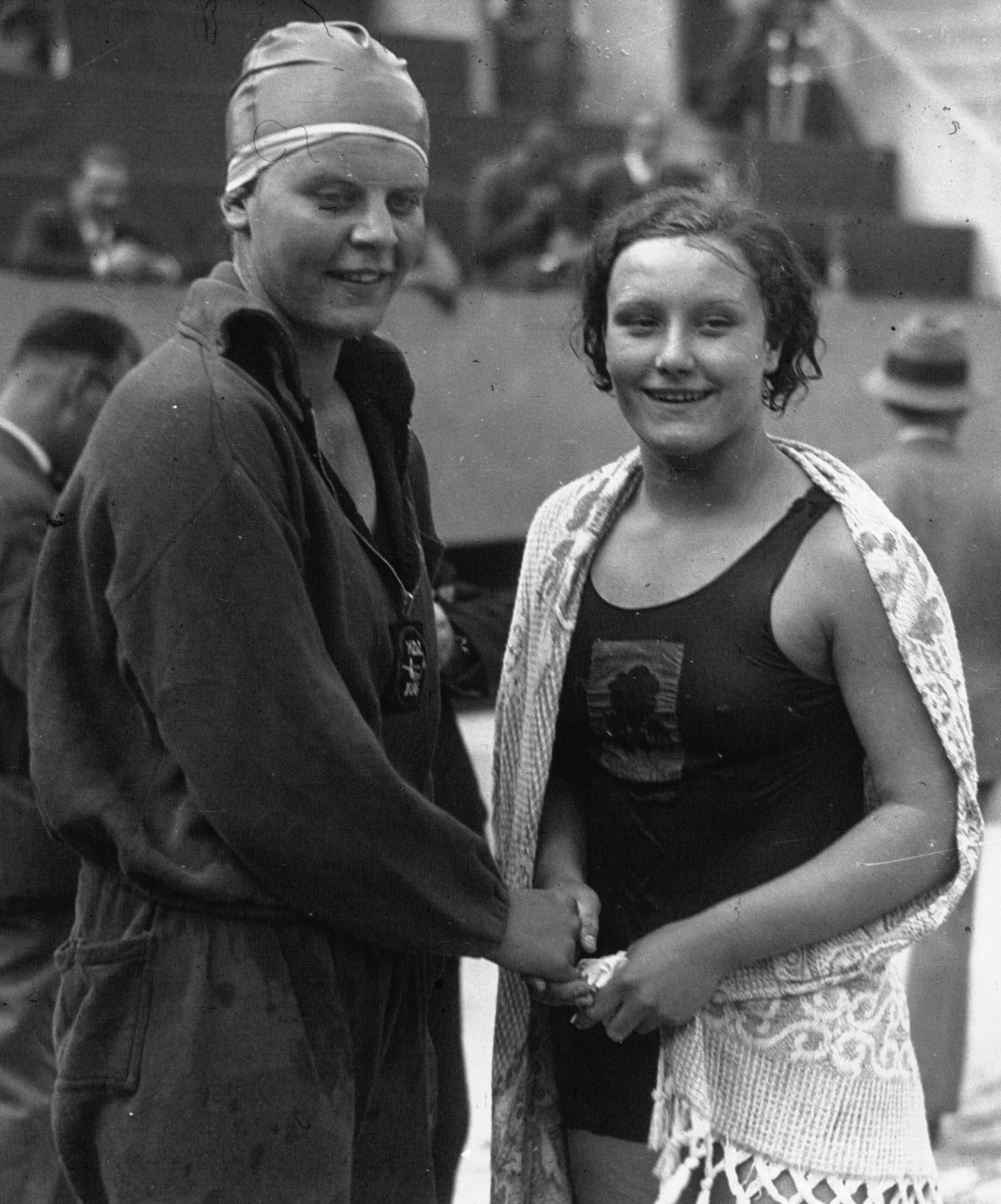
- Jenny Kastein and Wolstenholme (right) at 1931 European Championships

Personal information
- Full name: Cecelia Wolstenholme
- Nickname: "Squea"
- National team: Great Britain
- Born: 18 April 1915 Withington, England
- Died: 25 October 1968 (aged 53)

Sport
- Sport: Swimming
- Strokes: Breaststroke
- Club: Moss Side Swim Club
Medal record
Women's swimming
Representing Great Britain
European Championships
Gold medal – first place	1931 Paris	200 m breaststroke
Representing England
British Empire Games
Gold medal – first place	1930 Hamilton	200 yd breaststroke

Cecelia Wolstenholme (18 April 1915 – 25 October 1968), later known by her married name Cecelia Thornton, was an English competitive swimmer who represented Great Britain in the Olympic Games and European championships, and England in the British Empire Games.

== Biography ==
Wolstenholme was born in Manchester and swam for the Moss Side Swim Club.

She competed for the 1930 English team and won a gold medal in the 200 yd breaststroke event at the 1930 British Empire Games in Hamilton, Ontario, Canada.

She won the 200 m breaststroke at the 1931 European Championships, beating Jenny Kastein. and competed at the 1932 Summer Olympics, but failed to reach the final. Her younger sister Beatrice was also an international swimmer.
