= Norman Brooks (swimmer) =

English swimmer (1910–1953)

Personal information
- National team: Great Britain
- Born: 11 March 1910 Ashton-under-Lyne, England
- Died: 23 September 1953 (aged 43) Oldham, England

Sport
- Sport: Swimming
- Strokes: Freestyle
- Club: Stalybridge ASC; Oldham Police
Medal record
Men's swimming
Representing England
British Empire Games
Silver medal – second place	1930 Hamilton	100 yd freestyle
Silver medal – second place	1930 Hamilton	4×200 yd freestyle

Norman Standish Brooks (11 March 1910 – 23 September 1953) was an English competition swimmer who represented Great Britain in the Olympics and England in the British Empire Games during the late 1920s and early 1930s. He competed in freestyle swimming events.

== Biography ==
Brooks was born in Ashton-under-Lyne, Greater Manchester, England.

At the 1928 Summer Olympics in Amsterdam, Netherlands, he competed in the qualifying heats of the men's 100-metre freestyle. His time was the 17th best overall; he did not advance to the semi-finals. In 1929 he switched clubs from Stalybridge to Oldham Police.

Two years later he won the silver medal in 100-yards freestyle competition at the inaugural 1930 British Empire Games in Hamilton, Ontario. He won a second silver medal as a member of the English men's team in the 4×200-yard freestyle relay.

He died in Oldham, Greater Manchester, England aged 43.

== See also ==
- List of Commonwealth Games medallists in swimming (men)
