= Jack Aubin =

Canadian swimmer (1907–1999)

Personal information
- Full name: John Ernest Aubin
- Nickname: "Jack"
- National team: Canada
- Born: June 29, 1907 Twickenham, England
- Died: March 6, 1999 (aged 91) Mississauga, Ontario, Canada

Sport
- Sport: Swimming
- Strokes: Breaststroke
Medal record
Men's swimming
Representing Canada
British Empire Games
Gold medal – first place	1930 Hamilton	200 yd breaststroke

John Ernest Aubin (June 29, 1907 – March 6, 1999) was a Canadian breaststroke swimmer who competed in the 1928 Summer Olympics in Amsterdam.

He was born in Twickenham, England.

At the 1928 Olympics, he was eliminated in the first round of the 200-metre breaststroke event. Two years later, he won the 200-yard breaststroke competition at the 1930 British Empire Games.

== See also ==
- List of Commonwealth Games medallists in swimming (men)
