= Doris Ogilvie (diver) =

Canadian diver (1912–2003)

Personal information
- Full name: Lillian Doris Ogilvie
- Born: 4 July 1912 Toronto, Ontario, Canada
- Died: 8 September 2003 (aged 91) Orangeville, Ontario, Canada

Sport
- Sport: Diving
Medal record
British Empire Games
Silver medal – second place	1930 Hamilton	3m springboard event
Bronze medal – third place	1934 London	3m springboard event

Lillian Doris Ogilvie (4 July 1912 – 8 September 2003) was a Canadian diver.

Ogilvie competed in the women's 3 metre springboard event at the 1932 Summer Olympics. She also competed in the 1930 British Empire Games, where she won a silver medal in the 3m springboard event, and at the 1934 British Empire Games where she won a bronze medal, also in the 3m springboard event.
