= Munroe Bourne =

Canadian swimmer

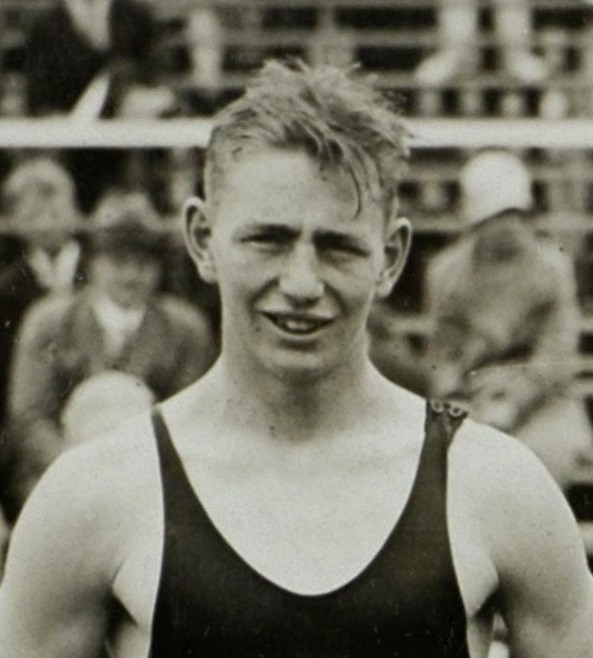

Personal information
- Full name: Frederick Munroe Bourne
- National team: Canada
- Born: June 26, 1910 Victoria, British Columbia
- Died: July 11, 1992 (aged 82) Rothesay, New Brunswick

Sport
- Sport: Swimming
- Strokes: Backstroke, freestyle
- Club: Montreal AAA
- College team: McGill University
Medal record
Men's swimming
Representing Canada
Olympic Games
Bronze medal – third place	1928 Amsterdam	4×200 m freestyle
British Empire Games
Gold medal – first place	1930 Hamilton	100 yd freestyle
Gold medal – first place	1930 Hamilton	4×200 yd freestyle

Frederick Munroe Bourne (June 26, 1910 – July 11, 1992) was a Canadian swimmer who competed at the 1928, 1932 and 1936 Olympics in the 100-metre freestyle, 100-metre backstroke and 4×200-metre freestyle relay events and won a bronze medal in the relay in 1928. He was eliminated in the preliminary rounds of all his individual events. Bourne won the 100-yard and 4×200-yard freestyle competitions at the 1930 British Empire Games.

Bourne trained in track and field athletics and water polo before focusing on swimming. In 1927 he entered McGill University in Montreal, and graduated in 1931 with degrees in English and political science. In 1932 he won a Rhodes Scholarship to study at Oxford University. He returned to McGill in 1935 to study for a medical degree, which he received in 1937. During World War II, Bourne served in the Canadian Army and was honourably discharged with the rank of major. Afterward he worked as a doctor and was inducted into the McGill Athletics Hall of Fame in 1996.

== See also ==
- List of Commonwealth Games medallists in swimming (men)
- List of Olympic medalists in swimming (men)
