= Valerie Davies =

Welsh swimmer (1912-2001)

Personal information
- Nationality: British (Welsh)
- Born: 29 June 1912 Cardiff, Wales
- Died: 2 August 2001 (aged 89) Newport, Wales

Sport
- Sport: Swimming
- Strokes: Freestyle, backstroke
- Club: Roath Park SC
Medal record
Women's swimming
Representing Great Britain
Olympic Games
Bronze medal – third place	1932 Los Angeles	100 m backstroke
Bronze medal – third place	1932 Los Angeles	4×100 m freestyle
European Championships (LC)
Gold medal – first place	1927 Bologna	4×100 m freestyle
Silver medal – second place	1931 Paris	4×100 m freestyle
Representing Wales
British Empire Games
Silver medal – second place	1930 Hamilton	100 yd backstroke
Silver medal – second place	1930 Hamilton	400 yd freestyle
Bronze medal – third place	1930 Hamilton	100 yd freestyle
Bronze medal – third place	1934 London	100 yd backstroke

Elizabeth Valerie Davies (29 June 1912 – 2 August 2001), later known by her married name Valerie Latham, was a Welsh competitive swimmer who represented Great Britain at the 1932 Summer Olympics.

== Swimming career ==
At only 15 she won secured a Welsh championship. Throughout her teenage years she won multiple Welsh swimming records. She also competed for Wales at the 1930 British Empire Games winning all three medals. She was awarded two silver medals in the 100 yards backstroke and the 400 yards freestyle and a bronze medal in the 100 yards freestyle. Four years later she won the bronze medal in the 100 yards backstroke event. In 1931, she represented Britain in 2 events at the World's Swimming Championships.

In the 1932 Olympics she won bronze medals in the 100 m backstroke event and in 4×100 m freestyle relay event and was third in her first round heat of 100 m freestyle event and did not advance.

== Personal life ==
Davies was born, 29 June 1912, in Cardiff. She lived by Roath Park Lake, where she had to do most of her training, as at the time there wasn't a pool larger than 20-yards in the local area. She married Ricki Latham, a pilot officer in the Auxiliary Air Force, in 1939. She died in Newport, in August 2001.

== See also ==
- List of Olympic medalists in swimming (women)
