= Patty Thompson (swimmer) =

Canadian swimmer

Personal information
- Full name: Patricia E. Thompson
- Nickname: "Patty"
- National team: Canada
- Born: December 5, 1945 (age 80) Hamilton, Ontario
- Height: 1.56 m (5 ft 1 in)
- Weight: 52 kg (115 lb)

Sport
- Sport: Swimming
- Strokes: Freestyle
- Club: Hamilton Aquatic Club
Medal record
Women's swimming
Representing Canada
Commonwealth Games
Silver medal – second place	1962 Perth	4×110 yd freestyle
Bronze medal – third place	1962 Perth	4×110 yd medley

Patricia E. Thompson (born December 5, 1945), later known by her married name Patty Bogumil, is a Canadian former freestyle swimmer. She was a member of the Canadian freestyle and medley teams that won a silver and a bronze medal at the 1962 British Empire and Commonwealth Games. Thompson competed at the 1964 Olympics in the 400-metre freestyle and 4×100-metre freestyle relay events, and finished in seventh place in the relay.

== Biography ==
Her father James was an Olympic medallist in swimming and a well-known Canadian coach. In 1963, she started assisting him at Hamilton Aquatic Club, and after his death in 1966 became the head coach until 1967. She later coached swimming at Hamilton YWCA, Etobicoke Memorial Swimming Club, Burlington Sea Cadets, Alderwood Swim Club and the Alderwood Teddy Bares.

In 1969, Thompson turned professional and won all her marathon competitions: the 16 km (10 mile) Hamilton Marathon, 27 km (17 mile) Rhode Island Marathon, 19 km (12 mile) Man and His World Marathon and 24-hour swim in Santa Fe, Argentina. The same year she was named World Women’s Professional Marathon Swimming Champion, ahead of Judith de Nijs, and inducted to the International Marathon Swimming Hall of Fame.

In 1991, aged 45, Thompson became the oldest woman to swim cross Lake Ontario. She did so within 19 hours and 18 minutes. She retired from swimming in 1996, and worked as a real estate law clerk for a Toronto law firm. She is married to Richard Bogumil. In 2002, she was inducted to the Ontario Aquatic Hall of Fame.
