= Phyllis Harding =

British swimmer (1907–1992)

Phyllis Harding -Turner
- Harding in her youth

Personal information
- Full name: Phyllis May Harding
- National team: Great Britain
- Born: 15 December 1907 Wandsworth, London, England
- Died: 16 November 1992 (aged 84) Rugby, England
- Spouse: James Turner

Sport
- Sport: Swimming
- Strokes: Backstroke, freestyle
- Club: Croydon Ladies Swim Club; Croydon (GBR)
Medal record
Women's swimming
Representing Great Britain
Olympic Games
Silver medal – second place	1924 Paris	100 m backstroke
European Championships
Silver medal – second place	1931 Paris	4×100 m freestyle
Bronze medal – third place	1927 Bologna	100 m backstroke
Bronze medal – third place	1931 Paris	100 m backstroke
Representing England
British Empire Games
Gold medal – first place	1930 Hamilton	4×100 yd freestyle
Gold medal – first place	1934 London	100 yd backstroke
Silver medal – second place	1934 London	3×110 yd medley
Bronze medal – third place	1930 Hamilton	100 yd backstroke

Phyllis May Harding (15 December 1907 – 16 November 1992), later known by her married name Phyllis Turner, was an English backstroke and freestyle swimmer who competed for Great Britain in the 1924 Summer Olympics, 1928 Summer Olympics, 1932 Summer Olympics and 1936 Summer Olympics. She was the first woman to compete in four Olympics.

In 1932, she set world records in both the 100 and 200-meter backstroke.

== Olympics ==
In the 1924 Olympics, in the first Olympic backstroke race for women, she won a silver medal in the 100-metre event. Four years later in Amsterdam she was third in the first round of the 100-metre backstroke event and did not advance. In the 1932 Olympics she was fourth in the 100-metre backstroke event. In the 1936 Olympics she was seventh in the 100-metre backstroke event.

Harding won a European Championship backstroke bronze medal at Bologna, Italy in 1927, and another at Paris in 1931, where she also won a silver medal in the 4×100 freestyle relay. Harding more significant international victories were at the British Empire Games where she captured a gold medal in the 4×100 yard freestyle relay in 1930 and took an individual gold in backstroke in 1934. She also won a bronze in the backstroke in 1930 and a silver in the 3×110 yards medley relay in 1934.

Harding was inducted into the International Swimming Hall of Fame as a "Pioneer Swimmer" in 1995.

=== Later life ===
Harding ended her competitive swimming career after the 1936 Olympics, and told the public she was to be known as Mrs. Turner. On 31 March 1934 she had married Coventry solicitor James Turner at St. Albans Church in Golders Green N.W. London. Her pink wedding cake featured a small swimming pool made of sugar.

She died on 16 November 1992, in Rugby, England, at the age of 84.

== See also ==
- List of members of the International Swimming Hall of Fame
- List of Olympic medalists in swimming (women)
