= Joyce Cooper =

English swimmer (1909–2002)

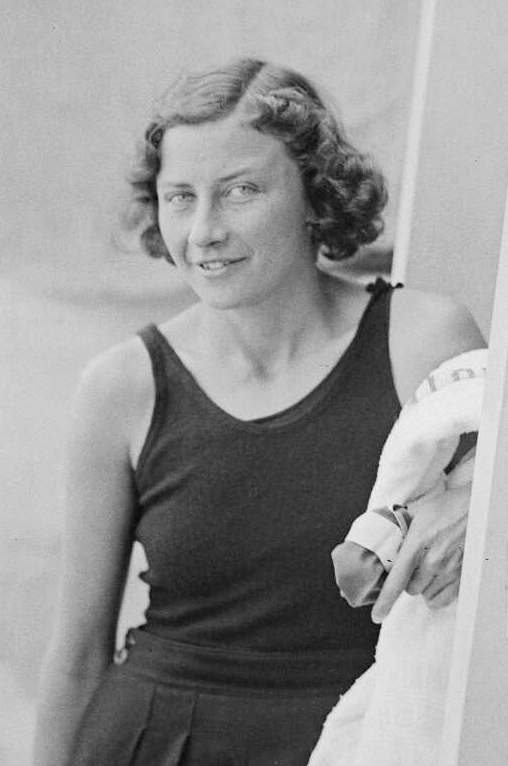
- Cooper in 1934

Personal information
- Full name: Margaret Joyce Cooper
- National team: Great Britain
- Born: 18 April 1909 Troup, Ceylon
- Died: 22 July 2002 (aged 93) Chichester, England

Sport
- Sport: Swimming
- Strokes: Backstroke, freestyle
- Club: Mermaid Swimming Club
Medal record
Representing United Kingdom
Olympic Games
| Silver medal – second place | 1928 Amsterdam | 4×100 m freestyle |
| Bronze medal – third place | 1928 Amsterdam | 100 m freestyle |
| Bronze medal – third place | 1928 Amsterdam | 100 m backstroke |
| Bronze medal – third place | 1932 Los Angeles | 4×100 m freestyle |
European Championships
| Gold medal – first place | 1927 Bologna | 4×100 m freestyle |
| Silver medal – second place | 1927 Bologna | 100 m freestyle |
| Silver medal – second place | 1931 Paris | 400 m freestyle |
| Silver medal – second place | 1931 Paris | 100 m backstroke |
| Silver medal – second place | 1931 Paris | 4×100 m freestyle |
| Bronze medal – third place | 1931 Paris | 100 m freestyle |
Representing England
British Empire Games
| Gold medal – first place | 1930 Hamilton | 100 yd freestyle |
| Gold medal – first place | 1930 Hamilton | 400 yd freestyle |
| Gold medal – first place | 1930 Hamilton | 100 yd backstroke |
| Gold medal – first place | 1930 Hamilton | 4×100 yd freestyle |

Margaret Joyce Cooper (18 April 1909 – 22 July 2002), later known by her married name Joyce Badcock, was an English competitive swimmer who represented Great Britain at the Olympics and European championships, and England at the British Empire Games, during the late 1920s and early 1930s.

== Swimming career ==
At the 1928 Summer Olympics in Amsterdam, she won a silver medal in the 4×100-metre freestyle relay, and a pair of bronze medals in the 100-metre freestyle and 100-metre backstroke events. In the 100-metre freestyle she finished together with Jean McDowell, but the judges gave the bronze medal to Cooper in a 3–2 vote.

Cooper also won one gold, four silver and one bronze medals at the 1927 and 1931 European championships, and, while representing England, four gold medals at the 1930 British Empire Games.

When Los Angeles hosted the 1932 Summer Olympics, she won a bronze in the women's 4×100-metre freestyle relay. In individual competition, she was fourth in the 400-metre freestyle, and sixth in the 100-metre backstroke.

== Personal life ==
Cooper was born in the British island colony of Ceylon (now Sri Lanka), where her father owned a tea plantation. In 1934 she married British Olympic rowing champion John Badcock. Their eldest son Felix Badcock won a bronze medal in rowing at the 1958 British Empire and Commonwealth Games in Cardiff, Wales and their younger son Francis 'David' M Badcock (born 1937), also rowed for the Thames RC and was a reserve for 1958 Commonwealth games crew in addition to rowing in the 1958 boat race.

== See also ==
- List of members of the International Swimming Hall of Fame
- List of Olympic medalists in swimming (women)
