= 1930 British Empire Games =

Multi-sport event in Hamilton, Canada

I British Empire Games
- Host city: Hamilton, Canada
- Nations: 11
- Athletes: 400
- Events: 59
- Opening: 16 August 1930
- Closing: 23 August 1930
- Opened by: Lord Willingdon
- Athlete's Oath: Percy Williams
- Main venue: Civic Stadium

The 1930 British Empire Games were the inaugural edition of what is now known as the Commonwealth Games, and was held in Hamilton, Ontario, from 16 to 23 August 1930.

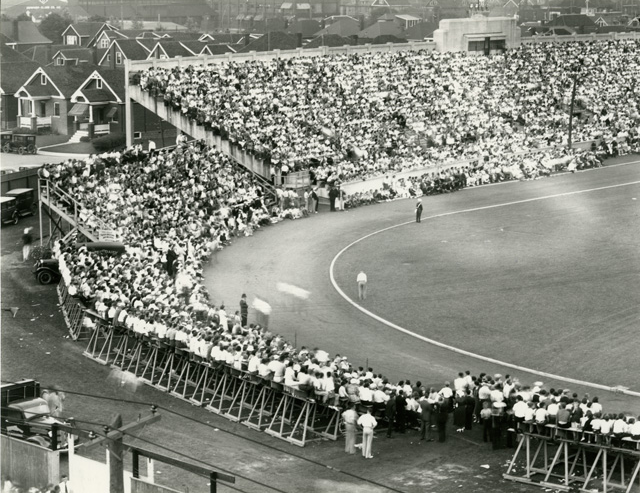
The Civic Stadium in 1939

The event was organized by Hamilton Spectator sportswriter Bobby Robinson after he attended the 1928 Summer Olympics in Amsterdam as manager of the Canadian track and field team and was inspired to create a similar event for the British Empire. After campaigning for the idea among contacts he met at the Olympics, he was asked to organise the first British Empire Games in Hamilton. Fellow Hamilton journalist Ivan Miller helped with the organizing committee.

The sports included athletics, boxing, lawn bowls, rowing, swimming, and wrestling. Women competed only in aquatic events. The opening ceremony and athletics events were held at Civic Stadium (later renamed Ivor Wynne Stadium) in east Hamilton.

The event was opened by the Governor General of Canada, Lord Willingdon, on 16 August. Canadian triple jumper Gordon Smallacombe claimed the debut gold medal a few hours later.

The 1930 British Empire Games made use of pedestals for dignitaries to present medals to winning athletes, as proposed by Bobby Robinson. This inspired the Olympic medal podium ceremonies which began at the 1932 Winter Olympics.

== Sports ==
- Aquatics ()
  - Diving ()
  - Swimming ()
- Athletics ()
- Boxing ()
- Lawn bowls ()
- Rowing ()
- Wrestling ()

== Participating teams ==
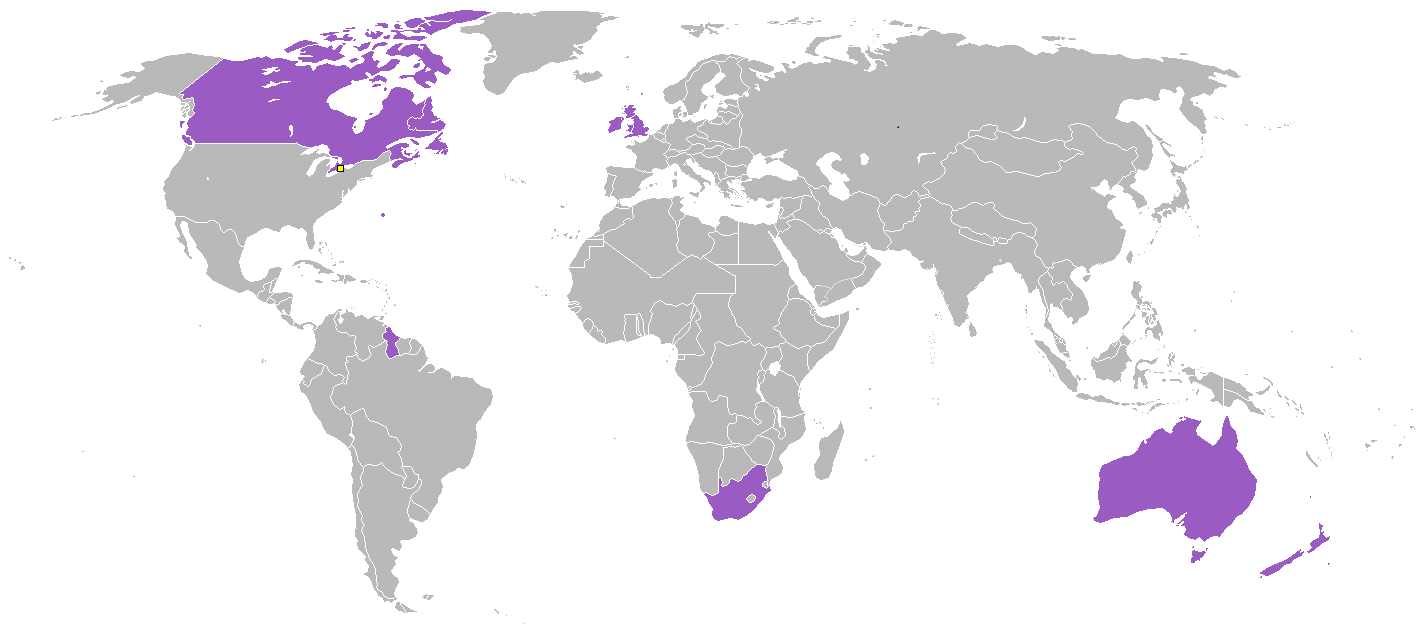
Participating countries

There were 11 teams participating in these inaugural British Empire Games:

- Australia
- Bermuda
- British Guiana
- Canada (host)
- England
- Ireland
- Newfoundland
- New Zealand
- Scotland
- South Africa
- Wales

== Medal table ==
* Host nation (Canada)

Rank	Nation	Gold	Silver	Bronze	Total
1	England	25	22	13	60
2	Canada*	20	17	17	54
3	South Africa	6	4	8	18
4	New Zealand	3	4	2	9
5	Australia	3	4	1	8
6	Scotland	2	2	6	10
7	Wales	0	2	1	3
8	British Guiana	0	1	1	2
9	Ireland	0	1	0	1
Totals (9 entries)		59	57	49	165

== Venues ==
Notable venues include:

- Prince of Wales Elementary School, (77 Melrose Ave N) – Male Accommodation
- Royal Connaught Hotel – Female Accommodation
- Civic Stadium – Athletics, opening and closing ceremonies
- Hamilton Municipal Pool – Aquatics (swimming and diving)
- Barton Street Arena - Boxing and wrestling
- Burlington Bay - Rowing
- Roselawn Bowling Club, Gage Park - Lawn bowls

Preceded by –	British Empire Games; Hamilton; I British Empire Games	Succeeded by London
