= India at the 1934 British Empire Games =

- CG code: IND
- CGA: Indian Olympic Association
- Website: olympic.ind.in

in London, England
- Competitors: 6 in 2 sports
- Medals Ranked 12th: Gold 0 Silver 0 Bronze 1 Total 1

British Empire Games appearances
- 1934; 1938; 1950; 1954; 1958; 1962; 1966; 1970; 1974; 1978; 1982; 1986; 1990; 1994; 1998; 2002; 2006; 2010; 2014; 2018; 2022; 2026; 2030

British India competed at the 1934 British Empire Games, held in London, from 4 to 11 August 1934. It was the country's first appearance at the British Empire Games. The Indian contingent consisted of six athletes who competed in 11 events across two sports.

India won a single bronze medal, its first ever Commonwealth Games medal. Rashid Anwar won the bronze medal in the men's welterweight in wrestling.

== Medalists ==
India won a single bronze medal, its first ever Commonwealth Games medal.

Medal	Name	Sport	Event
(bronze) Bronze	Rashid Anwar	Wrestling	Men's welterweight

== Competitors ==
The Indian contingent consisted of six athletes who competed in 11 events across two sports.

Sport	Men	Women	Total
Athletics	5	0	5
Wrestling	1	—N/a	1

== Athletics ==
=== Track ===
Athlete	Event	Heat		Semifinal		Final	
Athlete	Event	Result	Rank	Result	Rank	Result	Rank
Ronald Vernieux	Men's 100 yds	NA	3	Did not qualify			
Ronald Vernieux	Men's 220 yds	NA		Did not qualify			
Gyan Prakash Bhalla	Men's 440 yds	NA		Did not qualify			
Niranjan Singh	Men's 120 yds hurdles	NA	3	—N/a		Did not qualify	
Ronald Vernieux; Gyan Prakash Bhalla; Niranjan Singh; Jahangir Khan	Men's 4 × 110 yds relay	—N/a				NA	6

=== Field ===
Athlete	Event	Result	Rank
Niranjan Singh	Men's high jump	DNS	
Niranjan Singh	Men's long jump	NA	
Niranjan Singh	Men's triple jump	NA	
Jahangir Khan	Men's javelin throw	DNS	
Abdul Safi Khan	Men's javelin throw	NA	
Abdul Safi Khan	Men's pole vault	11 ft 3/8 in	NA

== Wrestling ==
Rashid Anwar won the bronze medal in the men's welterweight.

Athlete	Event	Round robin			Rank
Athlete	Event	Opposition Result	Opposition Result	Opposition Result	Rank
Rashid Anwar	Men's welterweight	Fox (ENG); L	Morgan (WAL); W	Schleimer (CAN); L	3rd place, bronze medalist(s)
