= Athletics at the 1934 British Empire Games – Men's 220 yards =

Men's 220 yards at the Commonwealth Games

The men's 220 yards event at the 1934 British Empire Games was held on 6 and 7 August at the White City Stadium in London, England.

== Medalists ==
Gold	Silver	Bronze
Arthur Sweeney; England	Marthinus Theunissen; South Africa	Walter Rangeley; England

== Results ==
=== Heats ===
Held on 6 August

Qualification: First 2 in each heat (Q) qualify directly for the semifinals.

Rank	Heat	Name	Nationality	Time	Notes
1	1	Howard Yates	Australia	22.4	Q
2	1	Maurice Hintze	England	??.?	Q, +6 yd
3	1	Chester Lawrence	Newfoundland	??.?	
4	1	Cyril Williams	Wales	??.?	
1	2	Walter Rangeley	England	22.3	Q
2	2	Birchall Pearson	Canada	??.?	Q, +7 yd
3	2	David Brownlee	Scotland	??.?	
4	2	Richard Freisenbruch	Bermuda	??.?	
5	2	G. Hartwell	Southern Rhodesia	??.?	
1	3	Ian Young	Scotland	22.4	Q
2	3	Denis Rathbone	England	??.?	Q, +0.5 yd
3	3	Allan Poole	Canada	??.?	
?	3	Buddy Card	Bermuda	??.?	
?	3	Ronald Vernieux	India	??.?	
1	4	Robin Murdoch	Scotland	22.8	Q
2	4	Noel Dempsey	Australia	22.9e	Q, +2 yd
3	4	Bill Christie	Canada	??.?	
1	5	Arthur Sweeney	England	22.5	Q
2	5	Frank Nicks	Canada	22.5e	Q, +Inches
?	5	R. Lovell	British Guiana	??.?	
?	5	Arthur Jones	Jamaica	??.?	
?	5	Archie Turner	Scotland	??.?	
1	6	Marthinus Theunissen	South Africa	22.5	Q
2	6	Cyril Cupid	Wales	22.7e	Q, +1.5 yd
3	6	Jack Horsfall	Australia	??.?	
4	6	Frank Peniston	Bermuda	??.?	

=== Semifinals ===
Held on 6 August

Qualification: First 3 in each heat (Q) qualify directly for the final.

Rank	Heat	Name	Nationality	Time	Notes
1	1	Arthur Sweeney	England	22.6	Q
2	1	Ian Young	Scotland	22.9	Q, +1 yd
3	1	Frank Nicks	Canada	??.?	Q, +1 yd
4	1	Noel Dempsey	Australia	??.?	
?	1	Cyril Cupid	Wales	??.?	
?	1	Denis Rathbone	England	??.?	
1	2	Marthinus Theunissen	South Africa	22.2	Q
2	2	Walter Rangeley	England	??.?	Q, +3.5 yd
3	2	Robin Murdoch	Scotland	??.?	Q, +1 yd
4	2	Birchall Pearson	Canada	??.?	
5	2	Howard Yates	Australia	??.?	
6	2	Maurice Hintze	England	??.?	

=== Final ===
Held on 7 August

Rank	Name	Nationality	Time	Notes
1st place, gold medalist(s)	Arthur Sweeney	England	21.9	
2nd place, silver medalist(s)	Marthinus Theunissen	South Africa	22.0e	+0.5 yd
3rd place, bronze medalist(s)	Walter Rangeley	England	22.1e	+0.5 yd
4	Robin Murdoch	Scotland	??.?	
5	Ian Young	Scotland	??.?	
6	Frank Nicks	Canada	??.?	
