= Athletics at the 1934 British Empire Games – Men's 100 yards =

Men's 100 yards at the 1934 British Empire Games
- Venue: White City Stadium
- Date: 5 August
- Competitors: 28 from 13 nations
- Winning time: 10.0

Medalists
| gold medal | Arthur Sweeney | England |
| silver medal | Marthinus Theunissen | South Africa |
| bronze medal | Ian Young | Scotland |

The men's 100 yards event at the 1934 British Empire Games was held on 5 August at the White City Stadium in London, England.

== Results ==
=== Heats ===
Qualification: First 2 in each heat (Q) qualify directly for the semifinals.

| Rank | Heat | Name | Nationality | Time | Notes |
|---|---|---|---|---|---|
| 1 | 1 | Ian Young | Scotland | 9.9 | Q |
| 2 | 1 | George Saunders | England | ??.? | Q +1 yd |
| 3 | 1 | Chester Lawrence | Newfoundland | ??.? | |
| 4 | 1 | Noel Dempsey | Australia | ??.? | |
| 5 | 1 | Ian Bell | Northern Ireland | ??.? | |
| 1 | 2 | Arthur Sweeney | England | 10.1 | Q |
| 2 | 2 | Frank Nicks | Canada | 10.4e | Q, +3 yd |
| 3 | 2 | David Brownlee | Scotland | ??.? | |
| 4 | 2 | Stan Gascoigne | Bermuda | ??.? | |
| | 2 | R. Lovell | British Guiana | DNS | |
| 1 | 3 | Everard Davis | England | 10.2 | Q |
| 2 | 3 | Allan Poole | Canada | 10.2e | Q, +1 ft |
| 3 | 3 | Ronald Vernieux | India | ??.? | |
| 4 | 3 | G. Hartwell | Southern Rhodesia | ??.? | |
| 1 | 4 | Walter Rangeley | England | 10.1 | Q |
| 2 | 4 | Howard Yates | Australia | 10.1e | Q, +inches |
| 3 | 4 | Birchall Pearson | Canada | 10.1e | |
| 4 | 4 | Archie Turner | Scotland | 10.2e | |
| 5 | 4 | Frank Peniston | Bermuda | ??.? | |
| 1 | 5 | Marthinus Theunissen | South Africa | 10.0 | Q |
| 2 | 5 | Cyril Cupid | Wales | 10.1e | Q, +1 yd |
| 3 | 5 | Jack Horsfall | Australia | ??.? | |
| ? | 5 | Richard Freisenbruch | Bermuda | ??.? | |
| ? | 5 | Arthur Jones | Jamaica | ??.? | |
| 1 | 6 | Robin Murdoch | Scotland | 10.0 | Q |
| 2 | 6 | Bill Christie | Canada | 10.2e | Q, +2 yd |
| ? | 6 | Buddy Card | Bermuda | ??.? | |
| ? | 6 | Cyril Williams | Wales | ??.? | |

=== Semifinals ===
Qualification: First 3 in each heat (Q) qualify directly for the final.

| Rank | Heat | Name | Nationality | Time | Notes |
|---|---|---|---|---|---|
| 1 | 1 | Arthur Sweeney | England | 9.9 | Q |
| 2 | 1 | Ian Young | Scotland | ??.? | Q, +0.5 yd |
| 3 | 1 | Howard Yates | Australia | 10.1e | Q, +1 yd |
| 4 | 1 | Frank Nicks | Canada | ??.? | |
| 5 | 1 | Cyril Cupid | Wales | ??.? | |
| 6 | 1 | Everard Davis | England | ??.? | |
| 1 | 2 | Marthinus Theunissen | South Africa | 10.0 | Q |
| 2 | 2 | George Saunders | England | 10.0e | Q, +inches |
| 3 | 2 | Robin Murdoch | Scotland | ??.? | Q, +2 ft |
| 4 | 2 | Allan Poole | Canada | ??.? | |
| 5 | 2 | Bill Christie | Canada | ??.? | |
| 6 | 2 | Walter Rangeley | England | ??.? | |

=== Final ===
| Rank | Name | Nationality | Time | Notes |
|---|---|---|---|---|
| 1st place, gold medalist(s) | Arthur Sweeney | England | 10.0 | |
| 2nd place, silver medalist(s) | Marthinus Theunissen | South Africa | 10.1e | |
| 3rd place, bronze medalist(s) | Ian Young | Scotland | 10.1e | |
| 4 | George Saunders | England | ??.? | |
| 5 | Robin Murdoch | Scotland | ??.? | |
| 6 | Howard Yates | Australia | ??.? | |
