= Athletics at the 1934 British Empire Games – Men's 4 × 110 yards relay =

Men's 4 × 110 yards relay at the Commonwealth Games

The men's 4 × 110 yards relay event at the 1934 British Empire Games was held on 7 August at the White City Stadium in London, England.

== Results ==
| Rank | Nation | Athletes | Time | Notes |
|---|---|---|---|---|
| 1st place, gold medalist(s) | England | Everard Davis, George Saunders, Walter Rangeley, Arthur Sweeney | 42.2 | =GR |
| 2nd place, silver medalist(s) | Canada | Birchall Pearson, Frank Nicks, Allan Poole, Bill Christie | 42.5e | +6 yd |
| 3rd place, bronze medalist(s) | Scotland | Archie Turner, David Brownlee, Robin Murdoch, Ian Young | 43.0e | +6 yd |
| 4 | Australia | Noel Dempsey, Fred Woodhouse, Jack Horsfall, Howard Yates | ??.? | |
| 5 | Bermuda | Stan Gascoigne, Buddy Card, Frank Peniston, Richard Freisenbruch | ??.? | |
| 6 | India | Ronald Vernieux, Jahangir Khan, Gyan Prakash Bhalla, Niranjan Singh | ??.? | |
