= Athletics at the 1934 British Empire Games – Men's 4 × 440 yards relay =

Men's 4 × 440 yards relay at the Commonwealth Games

The men's 4 × 440 yards relay event at the 1934 British Empire Games was held on 7 August at the White City Stadium in London, England.

== Results ==
Rank	Nation	Athletes	Time	Notes
1st place, gold medalist(s)	England	Denis Rathbone, Geoffrey Blake, Crew Stoneley, Godfrey Rampling	3:16.8	GR
2nd place, silver medalist(s)	Canada	William Fritz, John Addison, Art Scott, Ray Lewis	3:17.2e	+3 yd
3rd place, bronze medalist(s)	Scotland	Richard Wallace, Ronald Wylde, Hamish Stothard, Alan Hunter	?:??.?	+120 yd
	Australia		DNS	
