= Athletics at the 1934 British Empire Games – Men's 440 yards =

Men's 440 yards at the Commonwealth Games

The men's 440 yards event at the 1934 British Empire Games was held on 5, 6 and 7 August at the White City Stadium in London, England.

== Medalists ==
Gold	Silver	Bronze
Godfrey Rampling; England	Bill Roberts; England	Crew Stoneley; England

== Results ==
=== Heats ===
Qualification: First 2 in each heat (Q) qualify directly for the semifinals.

Rank	Heat	Name	Nationality	Time	Notes
1	1	William Fritz	Canada	51.8	Q
2	1	Geoffrey Blake	England	51.9e	Q, +1 yd
?	1	Gyan Prakash Bhalla	India	??.?	
?	1	Geoff Broadway	New Zealand	??.?	
1	2	Godfrey Rampling	England	49.4	Q
2	2	Art Scott	Canada	50.1	Q, +8 yd
3	2	G. Crispin	Southern Rhodesia	??.?	
	2	Jack Horsfall	Australia	DNS	
1	3	Bill Roberts	England	50.0	Q
2	3	John Addison	Canada	??.?	Q, +3 yd
3	3	Ronald Wylde	Scotland	??.?	
?	3	Willie Botha	South Africa	??.?	
	3	Howard Yates	Australia	DNS	
1	4	Crew Stoneley	England	49.6	Q
2	4	Richard Wallace	Scotland	50.8	Q, +14 yd
3	4	Arthur Jones	Jamaica	??.?	
?	4	Charles Reilly	Australia	??.?	
?	4	Chester Lawrence	Newfoundland	??.?	
1	5	Ray Lewis	Canada	50.8	Q
2	5	Alan Hunter	Scotland	51.0e	Q
3	5	Wilton Lander	Australia	??.?	
4	5	Peter Fraser	Wales	??.?	

=== Semifinals ===
Qualification: First 3 in each heat (Q) qualify directly for the final.

Rank	Heat	Name	Nationality	Time	Notes
1	1	Godfrey Rampling	England	49.2	Q
2	1	William Fritz	Canada	49.8e	Q, +5 yd
3	1	Bill Roberts	England	??.?	Q, +2 yd
4	1	Art Scott	Canada	??.?	
5	1	Richard Wallace	Scotland	??.?	
1	2	Crew Stoneley	England	49.2	Q
2	2	John Addison	Canada	49.7e	Q, +5 yd
3	2	Alan Hunter	Scotland	??.?	Q, +2 yd
4	2	Ray Lewis	Canada	??.?	
5	2	Geoffrey Blake	England	??.?	

=== Final ===
Rank	Name	Nationality	Time	Notes
1st place, gold medalist(s)	Godfrey Rampling	England	48.0	
2nd place, silver medalist(s)	Bill Roberts	England	48.5e	+4.5 yd
3rd place, bronze medalist(s)	Crew Stoneley	England	48.6e	+2 ft
4	William Fritz	Canada	??.?	
5	John Addison	Canada	??.?	
6	Alan Hunter	Scotland	??.?	
