= Wrestling at the 1936 Summer Olympics – Men's freestyle welterweight =

Men's freestyle welterweight at the Games of the XI Olympiad
- Venue: Deutschlandhalle
- Dates: 2–4 August 1936
- Competitors: 16 from 16 nations

Medalists
1st place, gold medalist(s)		Frank Lewis	United States
2nd place, silver medalist(s)		Thure Andersson	Sweden
3rd place, bronze medalist(s)		Joe Schleimer	Canada

The men's freestyle welterweight competition at the 1936 Summer Olympics in Berlin took place from 2 August to 4 August at the Deutschlandhalle. Nations were limited to one competitor. This weight class was limited to wrestlers weighing up to 72kg.

This freestyle wrestling competition continued to use the "bad points" elimination system introduced at the 1928 Summer Olympics for Greco-Roman and at the 1932 Summer Olympics for freestyle wrestling, with a slight modification. Each round featured all wrestlers pairing off and wrestling one bout (with one wrestler having a bye if there were an odd number). The loser received 3 points if the loss was by fall or unanimous decision and 2 points if the decision was 2-1 (this was the modification from prior years, where all losses were 3 points). The winner received 1 point if the win was by decision and 0 points if the win was by fall. At the end of each round, any wrestler with at least 5 points was eliminated.

== Schedule ==
Date	Event
2 August 1936	Round 1
4 August 1936	Round 2 Round 3 Round 4 Round 5 Round 6

== Results ==
=== Round 1 ===
Of the winners, five won by fall and advanced with 0 points while three won by decision and moved to the second round with 1 point. The losers featured two by split decision (2 points), 1 by unanimous decision (3 points), and five by fall (3 points).

Bouts

Winner	Nation	Victory Type	Loser	Nation
Sepp Paar	Germany	Decision, 2–1	John O'Hara	Australia
Thure Andersson	Sweden	Fall	Alois Samec	Czechoslovakia
Jaakko Pietilä	Finland	Decision, 3–0	Kálmán Sóvári	Hungary
Willy Angst	Switzerland	Fall	August Kukk	Estonia
Frank Lewis	United States	Fall	Julien Beke	Belgium
Joe Schleimer	Canada	Fall	Rashid Anwar	India
Jean Jourlin	France	Decision, 2–1	Hüseyin Erçetin	Turkey
William Fox	Great Britain	Fall	Shoichi Masutomi	Japan

Points

Rank	Wrestler	Nation	Start	Earned	Total
1	Thure Andersson	Sweden	0	0	0
1	Willy Angst	Switzerland	0	0	0
1	Frank Lewis	United States	0	0	0
1	Joe Schleimer	Canada	0	0	0
1	William Fox	Great Britain	0	0	0
6	Sepp Paar	Germany	0	1	1
6	Jaakko Pietilä	Finland	0	1	1
6	Jean Jourlin	France	0	1	1
9	John O'Hara	Australia	0	2	2
9	Hüseyin Erçetin	Turkey	0	2	2
11	Alois Samec	Czechoslovakia	0	3	3
11	Kálmán Sóvári	Hungary	0	3	3
11	August Kukk	Estonia	0	3	3
11	Julien Beke	Belgium	0	3	3
11	Rashid Anwar	India	0	3	3
11	Shoichi Masutomi	Japan	0	3	3

=== Round 2 ===
Four men finished the second round with 2–0 records; Lewis was the only one to win both by fall and have 0 points, while the other three had one win by fall and one by decision. Eight wrestlers had a 1–1 record, with six of them ending the round with 3 points and two finishing with 4 points. The four contestants who were 0–2 were eliminated.

Bouts

Winner	Nation	Victory Type	Loser	Nation
John O'Hara	Australia	Decision, 3–0	Alois Samec	Czechoslovakia
Sepp Paar	Germany	Fall	Thure Andersson	Sweden
Willy Angst	Switzerland	Decision, 3–0	Jaakko Pietilä	Finland
Kálmán Sóvári	Hungary	Decision, 2–1	August Kukk	Estonia
Frank Lewis	United States	Fall	Joe Schleimer	Canada
Julien Beke	Belgium	Fall	Rashid Anwar	India
Hüseyin Erçetin	Turkey	Decision, 3–0	William Fox	Great Britain
Jean Jourlin	France	Fall	Shoichi Masutomi	Japan

Points

Rank	Wrestler	Nation	Start	Earned	Total
1	Frank Lewis	United States	0	0	0
2	Willy Angst	Switzerland	0	1	1
2	Jean Jourlin	France	1	0	1
2	Sepp Paar	Germany	1	0	1
5	Thure Andersson	Sweden	0	3	3
5	Julien Beke	Belgium	3	0	3
5	Hüseyin Erçetin	Turkey	2	1	3
5	William Fox	Great Britain	0	3	3
5	John O'Hara	Australia	2	1	3
5	Joe Schleimer	Canada	0	3	3
11	Kálmán Sóvári	Hungary	3	1	4
11	Jaakko Pietilä	Finland	1	3	4
13	August Kukk	Estonia	3	2	5
14	Rashid Anwar	India	3	3	6
14	Shoichi Masutomi	Japan	3	3	6
14	Alois Samec	Czechoslovakia	3	3	6

=== Round 3 ===
The four men who began the round undefeated stayed that way; none facing each other, they all won. Lewis remained in the lead with 0 points, Angst and Jourlin stayed at 1 point apiece, and Paar added a second point. Two men, Andersson and Schleimer, improved to 2–1 and stayed at 3 points with wins by fall. The six men who lost in this round all finished 1–2 and were eliminated.

Bouts

Winner	Nation	Victory Type	Loser	Nation
Thure Andersson	Sweden	Fall	John O'Hara	Australia
Sepp Paar	Germany	Decision, 3–0	Jaakko Pietilä	Finland
Willy Angst	Switzerland	Fall	Kálmán Sóvári	Hungary
Frank Lewis	United States	Fall	Hüseyin Erçetin	Turkey
Joe Schleimer	Canada	Fall	Julien Beke	Belgium
Jean Jourlin	France	Default	William Fox	Great Britain

Points

Rank	Wrestler	Nation	Start	Earned	Total
1	Frank Lewis	United States	0	0	0
2	Willy Angst	Switzerland	1	0	1
2	Jean Jourlin	France	1	0	1
4	Sepp Paar	Germany	1	1	2
5	Thure Andersson	Sweden	3	0	3
5	Joe Schleimer	Canada	3	0	3
7	Julien Beke	Belgium	3	3	6
7	Hüseyin Erçetin	Turkey	3	3	6
7	William Fox	Great Britain	3	3	6
7	John O'Hara	Australia	3	3	6
11	Kálmán Sóvári	Hungary	4	3	7
11	Jaakko Pietilä	Finland	4	3	7

=== Round 4 ===
The first bout was the only one which resulted in elimination, as Paar's 3–1 record nevertheless gave him 5 bad points. Jourlin received his second point in the bout, but this was enough to take the lead as Lewis and Angst lost. Lewis, who entered the round at 0 points had the opportunity to eliminate Andersson but was thrown instead, both of the men in that bout finishing the round with 3 points. Schleimer also survived potential elimination by beating Angst; Schleimer stayed at 3 points while Angst moved to 4.

Bouts

Winner	Nation	Victory Type	Loser	Nation
Jean Jourlin	France	Decision, 3–0	Sepp Paar	Germany
Thure Andersson	Sweden	Fall	Frank Lewis	United States
Joe Schleimer	Canada	Fall	Willy Angst	Switzerland

Points

Rank	Wrestler	Nation	Start	Earned	Total
1	Jean Jourlin	France	1	1	2
2	Thure Andersson	Sweden	3	0	3
2	Frank Lewis	United States	0	3	3
2	Joe Schleimer	Canada	3	0	3
5	Willy Angst	Switzerland	1	3	4
6	Sepp Paar	Germany	2	3	5

=== Round 5 ===
Schleimer had the advantage of a bye, staying at 3 points. Andersson picked up a fourth point in eliminating Jourlin by decision. Lewis captured the gold medal with his win by fall in this round, eliminating Angst and leaving only three men standing. Lewis, however, had already faced both other men (defeating Schleimer in round 2 and losing to Andersson in round 4), so could not face either again. No matter the result of the bout between Andersson and Schleimer in round 6, Lewis would be the victor. He was tied at 3 points with Schleimer, but even if Schleimer won by fall in round 6 (staying at 3), Lewis had the head-to-head win as tie-breaker. And with 3 points to Andersson's 4, Lewis would have a better score than Andersson after the final round even if Andersson won by fall–and Lewis would therefore take gold despite having lost to Andersson.

Bouts

Winner	Nation	Victory Type	Loser	Nation
Thure Andersson	Sweden	Decision, 3–0	Jean Jourlin	France
Frank Lewis	United States	Fall	Willy Angst	Switzerland
Joe Schleimer	Canada	Bye	N/A	N/A

Points

Rank	Wrestler	Nation	Start	Earned	Total
1st place, gold medalist(s)	Frank Lewis	United States	3	0	3
2	Joe Schleimer	Canada	3	0	3
3	Thure Andersson	Sweden	3	1	4
4	Jean Jourlin	France	2	3	5
5	Willy Angst	Switzerland	4	3	7

=== Round 6 ===
Lewis had defeated Schleimer in round 2 and fallen to Andersson in round 4, so could not face either again and had guaranteed himself the gold medal. The only remaining bout possible was Schleimer against Andersson, with the winner to take silver and the loser bronze. Andersson defeated Schleimer.

Bouts

Winner	Nation	Victory Type	Loser	Nation
Thure Andersson	Sweden	Fall	Joe Schleimer	Canada

Points

Rank	Wrestler	Nation	Start	Earned	Total
2nd place, silver medalist(s)	Thure Andersson	Sweden	4	0	4
3rd place, bronze medalist(s)	Joe Schleimer	Canada	3	3	6
