= Athletics at the 1934 British Empire Games – Men's long jump =

Men's long jump at the Commonwealth Games

The men's long jump event at the 1934 British Empire Games was held on 7 August at the White City Stadium in London, England.

== Results ==
Rank	Name	Nationality	Result	Notes
1st place, gold medalist(s)	Sam Richardson	Canada	23 ft 6 1/4 in (7.17 m)	
2nd place, silver medalist(s)	Johann Luckhoff	South Africa	23 ft 3 1/2 in (7.10 m)	
3rd place, bronze medalist(s)	Jack Metcalfe	Australia	22 ft 9 in (6.93 m)	
4	Sandy Duncan	England	22 ft 8 in (6.91 m)	
5	Ray Cooper	Canada	22 ft 5 in (6.83 m)	
6	Leslie Butler	England	22 ft 3 1/4 in (6.79 m)	
	Jack Horsfall	Australia	?.??	
	Alf Gilbert	Canada	?.??	
	Robert Crombie	England	?.??	
	George Pallett	England	?.??	
	Niranjan Singh	India	?.??	
	Harold Brainsby	New Zealand	?.??	
	Albert Shillington	Northern Ireland	?.??	
	Maurice Tait	Northern Ireland	?.??	
	Robert Robertson	Scotland	?.??	
	Fred Woodhouse	Australia	DNS	
	R. Lovell	British Guiana	DNS	
	Edward Boyce	Northern Ireland	DNS	
	Johannes Viljoen	South Africa	DNS	
