= Athletics at the 1934 British Empire Games – Men's 120 yards hurdles =

Men's 120 yards hurdles at the Commonwealth Games

The men's 120 yards hurdles event at the 1934 British Empire Games was held on 6 August at the White City Stadium in London, England.

== Medalists ==
Gold	Silver	Bronze
Don Finlay; England	James Worrall; Canada	Ashleigh Pilbrow; England

== Results ==
=== Heats ===
Qualification: First 3 in each heat (Q) qualify directly for the final.

Rank	Heat	Name	Nationality	Time	Notes
1	1	John Gabriel	England	15.7	Q
2	1	James Worrall	Canada	??.?	Q, +0.5 yd
3	1	Niranjan Singh	India	??.?	
4	1	Andries du Plessis	South Africa	??.?	
1	2	Don Finlay	England	15.7	Q
2	2	Ashleigh Pilbrow	England	??.?	Q, +3 yd
3	2	R. Lovell	British Guiana	??.?	
4	2	Stan Macey	Wales	??.?	
1	3	Johannes Viljoen	South Africa	15.9	Q
2	3	Art Ravensdale	Canada	16.1e	Q, +2 yd
3	3	Roland Harper	England	??.?	

=== Final ===
Rank	Name	Nationality	Time	Notes
1st place, gold medalist(s)	Don Finlay	England	15.2	
2nd place, silver medalist(s)	James Worrall	Canada	15.5e	
3rd place, bronze medalist(s)	Ashleigh Pilbrow	England	15.7e	
4	Art Ravensdale	Canada	??.?	
5	John Gabriel	England	??.?	
	Johannes Viljoen	South Africa	DNF	
