= Boxing at the 1934 British Empire Games =

- Venue: Wembley Empire Pool
- Location: London, England
- Dates: 4 – 11 August 1934

At the 1934 British Empire Games, the boxing competition was held in London, England, and featured contests in eight weight classes.

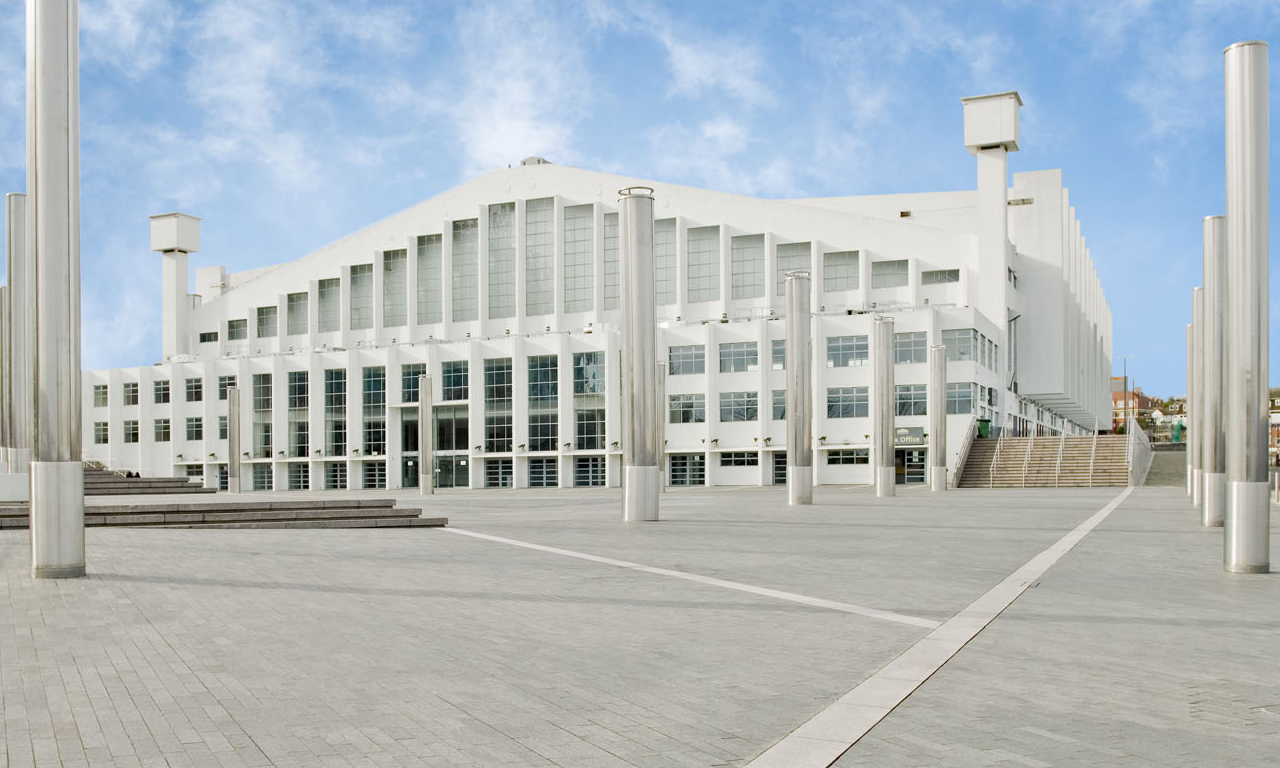
The newly opened Wembley Empire Pool hosted aquatics, boxing and wrestling.

The boxing events were held at the Wembley Empire Pool. England claimed six of the eight gold medals, improving on the tally of five that they won four years earlier.

== Medal table ==
* Host nation (England)

Medals won by nation with totals, ranked by number of golds—sortable
Rank	Nation	Gold	Silver	Bronze	Total
1	England (ENG)*	6	0	1	7
2	South Africa (SAF)	1	2	1	4
3	Australia (AUS)	1	0	0	1
4	Wales (WAL)	0	3	1	4
5	Canada (CAN)	0	2	0	2
6	Scotland (SCO)	0	1	2	3
7	Northern Ireland (NIR)	0	0	2	2
8	Southern Rhodesia (SRH)	0	0	1	1
Totals (8 entries)		8	8	8	24

=== Medallists ===
Event	Gold	Silver	Bronze
Flyweight 51 kg	Pat Palmer (ENG)	Maxie Berger (CAN)	Jackie Pottinger (WAL)
Bantamweight 54 kg	Eddie Ryan (ENG)	Albert Barnes (WAL)	Tommy Wells (SCO)
Featherweight 57 kg	(South Africa) Charles Catterall (SAF)	J. D. Jones (WAL)	(Southern Rhodesia) William Fulton (RHO)
Lightweight 60 kg	Leonard Cook (AUS)	Frank Taylor (WAL)	Harry Moy (ENG)
Welterweight 67 kg	Dave McCleave (ENG)	(South Africa) Dick Barton (SAF)	Billy Duncan (NIR)
Middleweight 75 kg	Alf Shawyer (ENG)	Leonard Wadsworth (CAN)	Jimmy Magill (NIR)
Light heavyweight 81 kg	George Brennan (ENG)	George Holton (SCO)	(South Africa) Robey Leibbrandt (SAF)
Heavyweight 91 kg	Pat Floyd (ENG)	(South Africa) Jan van Rensburg (SAF)	David Douglas-Hamilton (SCO)

== Results ==
=== First round ===
Weight	Winner	Loser	Score
Flyweight 51 kg
	(England) Pat Palmer	bye	
	(Canada) Maxie Berger	bye	
	(Scotland) James Reilly	bye	
	(Wales) Jackie Pottinger	bye	
Bantamweight 54 kg
	(England) Eddie Ryan	bye	
	(Wales) Albert Barnes	bye	
	(Scotland) Tommy Wells	bye	
	(Canada) Eddie Heathfield	(South Africa) J. R. Wade	Casting vote
Featherweight 57 kg
	(Wales) J. D. Jones	bye	
	(Canada) S. Tomlinson	bye	
	(South Africa) Charles Catterall	(England) John Treadaway	Points
	(Southern Rhodesia) William Fulton	(Scotland) Angus McGregor	Casting vote
Lightweight 60 kg
	(Australia) Leonard Cook	bye	
	(England) Harry Moy	bye	
	(Wales) Frank Taylor	(South Africa) C. B. Hull	Points
	(Scotland) Jim Rolland	(Canada) Joe Marsh	Points
Welterweight 67 kg
	(England) Dave McCleave	bye	
	(Canada) Irving Pease	bye	
	(South Africa) Dick Barton	(Wales) Vic Horton	Casting vote
	(Northern Ireland) Billy Duncan	(Scotland) Jacky MacLeod	Points
Middleweight 75 kg
	(England) Alf Shawyer	bye	
	(Northern Ireland) Jimmy Magill	bye	
	(South Africa) J. L. Smith	(Wales) Alf Ford	casting vote
	(Canada) Leonard Wadsworth	(Scotland) James McKillop	1st Round
Light heavyweight 81 kg
	(England) George Brennan	bye	
	(South Africa) Robey Leibbrandt	bye	
	(Wales) Wally Walters	bye	
	(Scotland) George Holton	(Canada) Tommy Osborne	Points
Heavyweight 91 kg
	(England) Pat Floyd	bye	
	(Canada) Bill Maich	bye	
	(South Africa) Jan van Rensburg	bye	
	(Scotland) Lord David Douglas-Hamilton	bye	

=== Semi-finals ===
Weight	Winner	Loser	Score
Flyweight
	Palmer	Reilly	Casting vote
	Berger	Pottinger	Points
Bantamweight
	Ryan	Wells	Casting vote
	Barnes	Heathfield	w/o
Featherweight
	Catterall	Fulton	Casting vote
	Jones	Tomlinson	Casting vote
Lightweight
	Cook	Moy	Casting vote
	Taylor	Rolland	Casting vote
Welterweight
	McCleave	Pease	ret 3rd round
	Barton	Duncan	Points
Middleweight
	Shawyer	Magill	Casting vote
	Wadsworth	Smith	stopped 2nd
Light heavyweight
	Brennan	Leibbrandt	1st round disq
	Holton	Walters	Points
Heavyweight
	Floyd	Maich	Stopped 2nd
	van Rensburg	Douglas Hamilton	Points

=== Bronze medal ===
Weight	Winner	Loser	Score
Flyweight	Pottinger	Reilly	Casting vote
Bantamweight	Wells	Heathefield	w/o
Featherweight	Fulton	Tomlinson	Casting vote
Lightweight	Moy	Rolland	w/o
Welterweight	Duncan	Pease	w/o
Middleweight	Magill	Smith	Points
Light heavyweight	Leibbrandt	Walters	Points
Heavyweight	Douglas Hamilton	Maich	3rd round

=== Finals ===
Weight	Winner	Loser	Score
Flyweight	Palmer	Berger	Points
Bantamweight	Ryan	Barnes	Points
Featherweight	Catterall	Jones	Points
Lightweight	Cook	Taylor	Casting vote
Welterweight	McCleave	Barton	Points
Middleweight	Shawyer	Wadsworth	Casting vote
Light heavyweight	Brennan	Holton	ret 3rd round
Heavyweight	Floyd	van Rensburg	1st round
