= Athletics at the 1934 British Empire Games – Men's javelin throw =

Men's javelin throw at the Commonwealth Games

The men's javelin throw event at the 1934 British Empire Games was held on 7 August at the White City Stadium in London, England.

== Results ==
Rank	Name	Nationality	Result	Notes
1st place, gold medalist(s)	Bob Dixon	Canada	196 ft 11 in (60.02 m)	
2nd place, silver medalist(s)	Harry Hart	South Africa	191 ft 2 in (58.27 m)	
3rd place, bronze medalist(s)	Johann Luckhoff	South Africa	185 ft 4 in (56.49 m)	
4	Stanley Wilson	England	179 ft 7 in (54.74 m)	
5	Joseph Heath	England	175 ft 3 in (53.42 m)	
6	George Walla	Canada	171 ft 1 1/2 in (52.16 m)	
	Charles Bowen	England	??.??	
	John Duus	England	??.??	
	Abdul Safi Khan	India	??.??	
	A. Spurling	Bermuda	DNS	
	George Sutherland	Canada	DNS	
	Jahangir Khan	India	DNS	
