= Cyril Williams (athlete) =

Welsh athlete

Personal information
- Nationality: British (Welsh)

Sport
- Sport: Athletics
- Event: Sprints
- Club: Newport AC; Dorset Regiment

Cyril Williams, was a Welsh athlete, who competed at the 1934 British Empire Games (now Commonwealth Games).

== Biography ==
Williams was a member of the Newport Athletics Club and served with the Dorsetshire Regiment. At the 1934 Welsh national championships, held in Newport, he finished runner-up to Cyril Cupid in the 100 yards event, sealing a place in the Welsh team for the forthcoming Empire Games.

Williams was selected for the Welsh team against the London Police in July 1934 participating in the 100 yards event.

He subsequently represented Wales at the 1934 British Empire Games in two athletic events; the 100 yards and the 220 yards.
