= Athletics at the 1934 British Empire Games – Men's 2 miles steeplechase =

Men's 2 miles steeplechase at the 1934 British Empire Games
- Venue: White City Stadium
- Date: 7 August 1934
- Winning time: 10:23.4

Medalists
gold medal	Stanley Scarsbrook	England
silver medal	Tom Evenson	England
bronze medal	George Bailey	England

The men's 2 miles steeplechase event at the 1934 British Empire Games was held on 7 August at the White City Stadium in London, England. It was the last time steeplechase was contested at the Games until 1962.

== Results ==
Rank	Name	Nationality	Time	Notes
1st place, gold medalist(s)	Stanley Scarsbrook	England	10:23.4	
2nd place, silver medalist(s)	Tom Evenson	England	10:25.8e	+12 yd
3rd place, bronze medalist(s)	George Bailey	England	?:??.?	+100 yd
4	Thomas Campbell	England	?:??.?	
5	Earl Moore	Canada	?:??.?	
6	William Gunn	Scotland	?:??.?	
