= Frank Whitcutt =

Welsh athlete

Personal information
- Nationality: British (Welsh)
- Born: 21 February 1906 Newport, Wales
- Died: 7 February 1979 Newport, Wales

Sport
- Sport: Athletics
- Event: High jump
- Club: Newport AC

Frank Burrage Whitcutt (21 February 1906 –7 February 1979) was a Welsh athlete, who competed at the 1934 British Empire Games (now Commonwealth Games).

== Biography ==
Whitcutt was a member of the Newport Athletics Club and in 1928, he set a Welsh record of 6 feet.

At the 1934 Welsh national championships, held in Newport, he won the high jump title.

Whitcutt represented Wales at the 1934 British Empire Games in one athletic event; the high jump event.
