= Peter Fraser (athlete) =

Welsh athlete (1913–1961)

Personal information
- Nationality: British (Welsh)
- Born: 22 May 1913 Cardiff, Wales
- Died: 19 October 1961 Newmarket, Suffolk, England

Sport
- Sport: Athletics
- Event: 440 yards
- Club: Achilles Club

Peter Malcolm Gordon Fraser (22 May 1913 – 19 October 1961) was a Welsh athlete, who competed at the 1934 British Empire Games (now Commonwealth Games).

== Biography ==
Fraser studied at the University of Cambridge and was a member of the Achilles Club and at the 1934 Welsh national championships, held in Newport, he won the 440 yards title.

He represented Wales at the 1934 British Empire Games in one athletic event; the 440 yards.
