= Wally Walters (boxer) =

Welsh boxer

Personal information
- Nationality: British (Welsh)

Sport
- Sport: Boxing
- Event(s): Light-heavweight; Heavyweight
- Club: Caerau BC, Maesteg; Derby Borough Police BC

Wally H. Walters was a boxer who competed for Wales at the Commonwealth Games.

== Biography ==
Walters boxed out of the Caerau Boxing Club of Maesteg. In March 1934 he won the Welsh light-heavyweight title which effectively sealed a place at the Empire Games.

He subsequently represented the Welsh team at the 1934 British Empire Games in London, where he participated in the light-heavyweight division, losing to George Holton of Scotland in the semi-final bout.

After the Games he continued to represent Wales at international level and by 1937 held both the light-heavyweight and heavyweight titles of Wales.

Walters became a police constable in Derby and boxed for the Derby Borough Police.

He was a twice winner of the Welsh ABA light-heavyweight championship from 1934 and 1935 and three times heavyweight champion in 1936, 1937 and 1939.
