= Tommy Wells (boxer) =

Scottish boxer

Personal information
- Nationality: British (Scottish)

Sport
- Sport: Boxing
- Event: Flyweight/Bantamweight
- Club: Leith Victoria A.A.C.
Medal record
Boxing
Representing Scotland
British Empire Games
Bronze medal – third place	1934 London	bantamweight

Thomas Wells was a boxer who competed for Scotland and won a bronze medal at the British Empire Games.

== Biography ==
Wells was best known for representing Scotland at the 1934 British Empire Games, where he won the bronze medal in the bantamweight division at the 1934 British Empire Games in London, losing to eventual gold medallist Eddie Ryan in the semi-final.

He boxed out of the Leith Victoria A.A.C. in Edinburgh. In November 1934 he held the Leith Victoria club titles at both flyweight and featherweight and in 1936, Wells was living at Main Street in Kirkliston and was the Scottish and Eastern District flyweight champion.
