= Wilf Short =

Welsh athlete

Personal information
- Nationality: British (Welsh)

Sport
- Sport: Athletics
- Event: Long-distance / marathon / cross-country
- Club: Newport Harriers

Wilf Short, was a Welsh athlete, who competed at the 1934 British Empire Games (now Commonwealth Games).

== Biography ==
Short was a member of the Newport Harriers. In July 1934 he won the Welsh Marathon Championships and Empire Games Trial.

He subsequently represented Wales at the 1934 British Empire Games in one athletic event; the marathon race, where he gained a sixth-place finish.

Short also competed in cross-country but dropped out of the marathon when defending his title at the 1935 Welsh Championships.
