= Charles Bowen =

Charles Bowen may refer to:

- Charles Bowen, Baron Bowen (1835–1894), English judge
- Charles Bowen (Ontario politician) (1923–1992), mayor of Brantford, 1973–1980
- Charles Bowen (New Zealand politician) (1830–1917), New Zealand politician
- Charles W. Bowen, U.S. Coast Guard officer
- Charles Bowen (athlete) (1908–1967), English military officer and athlete
- Chuck Bowen (fl. 1937), American baseball player
