= Athletics at the 1934 British Empire Games – Men's high jump =

Men's high jump at the Commonwealth Games

The men's high jump event at the 1934 British Empire Games was held on 6 August at the White City Stadium in London, England.

== Results ==
Rank	Name	Nationality	Result	Notes
1st place, gold medalist(s)	Edwin Thacker	South Africa	6 ft 3 in (1.91 m)	
2nd place, silver medalist(s)	Joe Haley	Canada	6 ft 3 in (1.91 m)	
3rd place, bronze medalist(s)	John Michie	Scotland	6 ft 3 in (1.91 m)	
4	Jack Metcalfe	Australia	6 ft 2 in (1.88 m)	
5	Arthur Gray	England	6 ft 1 in (1.85 m)	
6	William Land	England	6 ft 0 in (1.83 m)	
6	Stanley West	England	6 ft 0 in (1.83 m)	
6	Joseph McKenzie	Jamaica	6 ft 0 in (1.83 m)	
9	Frank Whitcutt	Wales	5 ft 10 in (1.78 m)	
?	Alf Gilbert	Canada	?.??	
?	Edward Bradbrooke	England	?.??	
?	R. Lovell	British Guiana	?.??	
?	Fred Woodhouse	Australia	DNS	
?	Sam Richardson	Canada	DNS	
?	Niranjan Singh	India	DNS	
?	Johannes Viljoen	South Africa	DNS	
