= Athletics at the 1934 British Empire Games – Men's discus throw =

Men's discus throw at the Commonwealth Games

The men's discus throw event at the 1934 British Empire Games was held on 5 August at the White City Stadium in London, England.

== Results ==
Rank	Name	Nationality	Result	Notes
1st place, gold medalist(s)	Harry Hart	South Africa	136 ft 3 in (41.53 m)	
2nd place, silver medalist(s)	Douglas Bell	England	132 ft 8 in (40.44 m)	
3rd place, bronze medalist(s)	Bernarr Prendergast	Jamaica	132 ft 0 in (40.23 m)	
4	George Walla	Canada	129 ft 3 in (39.40 m)	
5	William Land	England	129 ft 1 in (39.34 m)	
6	Kenneth Pridie	England	123 ft 11 1/2 in (37.78 m)	
7	George Sutherland	Canada	??.??	
?	A. Spurling	Bermuda	?	
?	Robert Waters	Canada	?	
?	Paddy Bermingham+	Northern Ireland	?	
?	Johann Luckhoff	South Africa	?	

+ Irish Free State athlete representing Northern Ireland
