= Stan Macey =

Welsh athlete

Personal information
- Nationality: British (Welsh)
- Born: 6 March 1898 Newport Wales
- Died: February 1986 Newport, Wales

Sport
- Sport: Athletics
- Event: Hurdles
- Club: Newport AC

Stanley Barnes Macey (6 March 1898 – February 1986) was a Welsh athlete, who competed at the 1934 British Empire Games (now Commonwealth Games).

== Biography ==
Macey was a member of the Newport Athletics Club and at the 1932 and 1933 Welsh national championships, he won the 120 yards hurdles title. The following year at Newport, he won a third consecutive title during the Welsh Amateur Championships and Empire Games Trials.

Macey represented Wales at the 1934 British Empire Games in one athletic events; the 120 yards hurdles.

He won the 1935 Glamorgan championship title.
