= Athletics at the 1934 British Empire Games – Men's 6 miles =

Men's 6 miles at the 1934 British Empire Games
- Venue: White City Stadium
- Date: 6 August 1934
- Winning time: 31:00.6

Medalists
gold medal	Arthur Penny	England
silver medal	Scotty Rankine	Canada
bronze medal	Arthur Furze	England

The men's 6 miles event at the 1934 British Empire Games was held on 6 August at the White City Stadium in London, England.

== Results ==
Rank	Name	Nationality	Time	Notes
1st place, gold medalist(s)	Arthur Penny	England	31:00.6	
2nd place, silver medalist(s)	Scotty Rankine	Canada	31:02.4e	+9 yd
3rd place, bronze medalist(s)	Arthur Furze	England	31:03.6e	+6 yd
4	Jack Holden	England	??:??.?	
5	John Potts	England	??:??.?	
6	Roy Oliver	Canada	??:??.?	
7	Lloyd Longman	Canada	??:??.?	
	Mannie Dookie	Trinidad and Tobago	DNF	
	Harold Thompson	South Africa	DNS	
