= Jacky MacLeod =

Scottish boxer

Personal information
- Nationality: British (Scottish)
- Born: c. 1921

Sport
- Sport: Boxing
- Event: Welterweight
- Club: Leith Victoria AAC

Jacky MacLeod also spelt McLeod (born c.1921) was a Scottish boxer who competed at the British Empire Games.

== Biography ==
MacLeod was a member of the Leith Victoria AAAC Boxing Club and was the 1933 Eastern Districts champion. MacLeod won the 1933 and 1934 Scottish welterweight titles representing Leith Victoria AAC.

He represented the 1934 Scottish team in the welterweight division at the 1934 British Empire Games in London, losing his quarter-final fight to Billy Duncan of Northern Ireland.

After the Games, MacLeod turned professional and fought 37 professional contests between 1934 and 1937. He stepped up in weight fighting at middleweight and won the Scottish middleweight title in 1936-37.
