= 1934 AAA Championships =

Outdoor track and field competition

- Dates: 13–14 July 1934
- Host city: London, England
- Venue: White City Stadium
- Level: Senior
- Type: Outdoor
- Events: 24

The 1934 AAA Championships was the 1934 edition of the annual outdoor track and field competition organised by the Amateur Athletic Association (AAA). It was held from 13 to 14 July 1934 at White City Stadium in London, England.

The Championships consisted of 24 events and covered two days of competition.

== Results ==
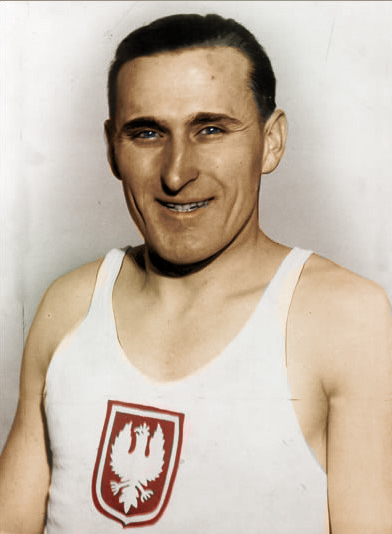
Pole Janusz Kusociński won the 3 miles race

| Event | Gold | | Silver | | Bronze | |
|---|---|---|---|---|---|---|
| 100 yards | (Hungary) József Sir | 9.9 | Arthur Sweeney | inches | (Netherlands) Chris Berger | 1 ft |
| 220 yards | (Scotland) Robin Murdoch | 22.1 | Arthur Sweeney | 22.2 | (Scotland) Ian Young | 22.4 |
| 440 yards | Godfrey Rampling | 49.6 | Crew Stoneley | 50.0 | Geoffrey Blake | 50.4 |
| 880 yards | Jack Cooper | 1:56.4 | Jack Powell | 1:57.4 | Michael Gutteridge | 1:57.7 |
| 1 mile | (New Zealand) Jack Lovelock | 4:26.6 | Sydney Wooderson | 4:27.8 | Jerry Cornes | 4:28.8 |
| 3 miles | (Poland) Janusz Kusociński | 14:13.6 | Walter Beavers | 14:26.0 | Cyril Allen | 14:26.3 |
| 6 miles | Jack Holden | 30:43.8 | Arthur Penny | 60-80 yd | Arthur Furze | 220 yd |
| 10 miles | Jack Holden | 52:21.4 | John Dougall | 54:10.0 | L. Mudd | 55:03.0 |
| marathon | Donald Robertson | 2:41:55.0 | Albert Norris | 2:55:05.0 | (South Africa) Tommy Lalande | 2:58:37.0 |
| steeplechase | Stanley Scarsbrook | 10:48.4 | Thomas Campbell | 10:58.7 | George Bailey | 10:59.3 |
| 120y hurdles | Don Finlay | 14.8 | (United States) Charles Stanwood | 15.0 | John Gabriel | 15.3 |
| 440y hurdles | Ralph Kilner Brown | 55.4 | (Republic of Ireland) Robert Wallace | 55.8 | (Scotland) Alan Hunter | 56.3 |
| 2 miles walk | Bert Cooper | 13:41.0 | Dick Edge | 13:45.0 | Don Brown | 40 yd |
| 7 miles walk | Johnny Johnson | 52:10.4 | Leslie Dickinson | 52:18.4 | Fred Redman | 52:22.4 |
| high jump | (Hungary) Mihály Bodosi | 1.905 | (Scotland) John Michie | 1.880 | Arthur Gray; William Land | 1.854 |
| pole vault | Frank Phillipson | 3.73 | (Scotland) Patrick Ogilvie | 3.73 | Dick Webster | 3.66 |
| long jump | (France) Robert Paul | 7.03 | Sandy Duncan | 6.89 | George Pallett | 6.86 |
| triple jump | (Northern Ireland) Edward Boyce | 14.55 | Jack Higginson Jr. | 13.11 | Leslie Butler | 12.88 |
| shot put | (Poland) Zygmunt Heljasz | 14.89 | (Republic of Ireland) Pat O'Callaghan | 14.04 | Robert Howland | 13.44 |
| discus throw | (Republic of Ireland) Paddy Bermingham | 42.44 | Douglas Bell | 40.78 | (Republic of Ireland) Ned Tobin | 40.64 |
| hammer throw | (Republic of Ireland) Pat O'Callaghan | 51.44 | (Republic of Ireland) Bill Britton | 45.64 | (Scotland) Sandy Smith | 45.54 |
| javelin throw | Charles Bowen | 51.74 | Stanley Wilson | 51.04 | John Duus | 50.22 |
| 440 yards relay | Budapesti Budai Torna Egylet | 43 sec | Preussen Krefeld | | ATC De Snelvoeters | |
| Tug of war | Royal Ulster Constabulary | | Monmouthshire Constabulary | | Royal Marines; London Borough Police | |

== See also ==
- 1934 WAAA Championships
