= Alf Shawyer =

English boxer (1907–1971)

Personal information
- Nationality: British (English)
- Born: 1 October 1907 Wandsworth, London
- Died: 13 May 1971 (aged 63) Wandsworth, London

Sport
- Sport: Boxing
- Event: Middleweight
- Club: Old Goldsmiths BC
Medal record
Boxing
Representing England
British Empire Games
Gold medal – first place	1934 London	middleweight

Alfred Samuel Shawyer (1907–1971) was an English boxer who competed for England.

== Boxing career ==
Shawyer boxed out of Old Goldsmiths BC.

He represented England at the 1934 British Empire Games in London, where he competed in the middleweight division, winning a gold medal.

Shawyer won the 1933 Amateur Boxing Association British middleweight title, when boxing out of the Old Goldsmiths ABC. He later defeated Johnny Williams of Brooklyn in the New York Golden Gloves tournament during 1935. On 8 December 1935, in the Oslo Colosseum, he fought Henry Tiller in England's first match against Norway.

== Personal life ==
He was a fireman by trade and lived at 81 Edward Street, Deptford in 1935.
