= James Reilly (boxer) =

Scottish boxer

Personal information
- Nationality: British (Scottish)

Sport
- Sport: Boxing
- Event: Flyweight
- Club: Southern AAC, Glasgow

James Reilly was a Scottish boxer who competed at the British Empire Games.

== Biography ==
Reilly was a member of the Southern Amateur Athletic Club of Glasgow and won the Scottish flyweight title in 1934. He stepped up in weight during 1935, boxing at bantamweight.

He represented the 1934 Scottish team in the flyweight division at the 1934 British Empire Games in London, losing the bronze medal fight to Welshman Jackie Pottinger.

In November 1934, both Reilly and his twin brother Mick Reilly, reached the final of the 1934 Western District Championships in Glasgow, which Mick surprisingly won.

He later turned professional and fought in 21 contests between 1936 and 1940.
