= Samec =

Samec (feminine Samcová) is a Czech surname. Notable people with the surname include:

- Alois Samec (1906–?), Czech wrestler
- Petr Samec (born 1964), Czech footballer
