= Athletics at the 1934 British Empire Games – Men's marathon =

Men's marathon at the Commonwealth Games

The men's marathon event at the 1934 British Empire Games was held on 7 August in London, England, with the start and finish at the White City Stadium.

== Results ==
Rank	Name	Nationality	Time	Notes
1st place, gold medalist(s)	Harold Webster	Canada	2:40:36	GR
2nd place, silver medalist(s)	Donald Robertson	Scotland	2:45:08	
3rd place, bronze medalist(s)	Dunky Wright	Scotland	2:56:20	
4	Harry Wood	England	2:58:41	
5	Percy Wyer	Canada	3:00:40	
6	Wilf Short	Wales	3:02:56	
7	Reg Nicholls	England	3:05:23	
	Norman Dack	Canada	?:??:??	
	Alex Burnside	Canada	?:??:??	
	Lawrence Weatherill	England	?:??:??	
	Albert Norris	England	?:??:??	
	Tom Kelly	Newfoundland	?:??:??	
	Mannie Dookie	Trinidad and Tobago	DNS	
