= Shōichi =

- Gender: Male

Origin
- Origin: Japanese
- Meaning: Different meanings depending on the kanji used

Shōichi, Shoichi or Shouichi (written: 昭一, 昇一, 正一, 昌一, 晶一, 勝一, 昇一 or 省一) is a masculine Japanese given name. Notable people with the name include:

- Shoichi Aoki (青木 正一; born 1955), Japanese photographer and editor
- Shoichi Arai (荒井 昌一; 1965–2002), Japanese professional wrestling announcer and executive
- Shoichi Funaki (船木 勝一; born 1968), Japanese professional wrestler
- Shoichi Hirose (広瀬 正一; born 1918), Japanese actor
- Shōichi Kokushi (聖一 国師; 1202-1208), Japanese Buddhist monk (also known as Enni)
- Shoichi Kondo (近藤 昭一; born 1958), Japanese politician
- Shoichi Kuwabara (born 1969), Japanese golfer
- Shoichi Masutomi (増富 省一; 1912–?), Japanese sport wrestler
- Shōichi Nakagawa (中川 昭一; 1953–2009), Japanese politician
- Shoichi Nishimura (西邑 昌一; 1912–1998), Japanese footballer and manager
- Shōichi Ozawa (小沢 昭一; 1929–2012), Japanese actor
- Shoichi Sakata (坂田 昌一; 1911–1970), Japanese academic and physicist
- Shoichi Sato (佐藤 正一; born 1947), Japanese golfer
- Nejime Shōichi (ねじめ 正一; born 1948), Japanese poet and writer
- Shōichi Ueno (上野 尚一; 1936–2016), Japanese newspaper publisher and philanthropist
- Shōichi Watanabe (渡部 昇一; born 1930), Japanese academic and writer
- Shoichi Yanagimoto (柳本 晶一; born 1951), Japanese volleyball player
- Shōichi Yokoi (横井 庄一; 1915–1997), Japanese military officer

== Fictional characters ==
- Shinkawa Shouichi (昌一 新川), a character in the light novel series Sword Art Online
- Tsugami Shouichi (津上翔一), a character in the television series Kamen Rider Agito
- Urata Shoichi (庄一), a character in the visual novel Tennis Ace

== See also ==
- 5922 Shouichi, a main-belt asteroid
