= James O'Reilly =

Jamie or James O'Reilly may refer to:

== Clergymen ==
- James O'Reilly (priest) (1836–1887), American Roman Catholic priest
- James O'Reilly (bishop) (1855–1934), American Roman Catholic bishop of Fargo, 1909–1934

== Public officials ==
- James O'Reilly (Canadian politician) (1823–1875), Ontario lawyer and MP
- James Edwin O'Reilly (1833–1907), Canadian mayor of Hamilton, Ontario
- James O'Reilly (Irish politician) (1916–1992), Northern Irish nationalist
- James O'Reilly (judge) (born 1955), Canadian lawyer and Federal judge

== Sportsmen ==
- Jamie O'Reilly (born 1988), Irish Gaelic footballer
- James O'Reilly (rugby union) (born 1994), New Zealand hooker

== See also ==
- James Reilly (disambiguation)
- James Riley (disambiguation)
