= Robert Roberston (long jumper) =

Scottish athlete

Personal information
- Nationality: British (Scottish)
- Born: 1912 Calgary, Canada
- Died: 1991 Dundee, Scotland

Sport
- Sport: Athletics
- Event: Long Jump
- Club: Glasgow University AC; Atalanta Club

Robert Nelson McQueen Roberston (1912 – 1991) was a track and field athlete from Scotland who competed at the 1934 British Empire Games (now Commonwealth Games).

== Biography ==
Robertson studied at the University of Glasgow and was a member of their athletics club. He was the Scottish champion over the long jump in 1933 and set a university record of 22 feet, 9 inches in May 1934. As a student of the university he was able to represent the Scottish Universities team known as Atalanta Club.

At the 1934 Scottish AAA Championships he successfully retained his long jump title.

He represented the Scottish Empire Games team at the 1934 British Empire Games in London, England, participating in one event, the long jump.

Robertson also played rugby union and gained his university blue for rugby in 1934. He served as a captain with the Royal Army Service Corps during World War II. After the war he worked as a solicitor in St Andrews and later as a registrar at the Universities of Dundee and Southampton.
