= Alf Ford =

Welsh boxer

Personal information
- Nationality: British (Welsh)
- Born: 1912 Pontnewynydd, Wales

Sport
- Sport: Boxing
- Event(s): Middleweight; Light-heavyweight
- Club: Pontnewynydd BC; Derby Police BC

Alfred Ford (1912 – date of death unknown) was a boxer who competed for Wales at the Commonwealth Games.

== Biography ==
Ford was born in Pontnewynydd and boxed out of the Pontnewynydd BC. He represented the Welsh team at the 1934 British Empire Games in London, where he participated in the middleweight division.

After the Games he continued represent Wales at international level as an amateur and stepped up in weight to light-heavyweight. Ford was three-times winner of the Welsh ABA light-heavyweight championship from 1937 to 1939.

In 1939, he reached the final of the presigious A.B.A. light-heavyweight championship but lost out to Bruce Woodcock.

In 1941, Ford was boxing as a member of the Derby Police.
