= George Holton (boxer) =

Scottish boxer

Personal information
- Nationality: British (Scottish)

Sport
- Sport: Boxing
- Event(s): Light heavyweight Welterweight
- Club: Douglas & Clydesdale; Nottingham Police BC
Medal record
Boxing
Representing Scotland
British Empire Games
Silver medal – second place	1934 London	light heavyweight

George Holton was a boxer who competed for Scotland and won a silver medal at the British Empire Games.

== Biography ==
Holton was best known for representing Scotland at the 1934 British Empire Games, where he won the silver medal in the light heavyweight division at the 1934 British Empire Games in London, losing to gold medallist George Brennan in the final.

He boxed out of the Douglas & Clydesdale and held the West of Scotland middleweight title but in November 1934 he joined the Nottingham police force and boxed for their club.
