= Vic Horton =

Welsh boxer

Personal information
- Nationality: British (Welsh)

Sport
- Sport: Boxing
- Event: Welterweight
- Club: Maindee BC

Vic Horton was a boxer who competed for Wales at the Commonwealth Games.

== Biography ==
Horton boxed out of the Maindee Boxing Club of Newport and gained selection for the Empire Games.

He represented the Welsh team at the 1934 British Empire Games in London, where he participated in the welterweight division

After the Games he continued to represent Wales at international level and also continued fighting as an amateur. Horton won the Welsh ABA welterweight championship in 1936.

By 1937 he had moved to Birmingham and was boxing for the Serck Boxing Club. His first appearance in Birmingham was the headline bout and drew a large attendance.
