= Wales at the 1934 British Empire Games =

- CGF code: WAL
- CGA: Wales at the Commonwealth Games
- Website: teamwales.cymru

in London, England
- Medals Ranked 8th: Gold 0 Silver 3 Bronze 3 Total 6

British Empire Games appearances
- 1930; 1934; 1938; 1950; 1954; 1958; 1962; 1966; 1970; 1974; 1978; 1982; 1986; 1990; 1994; 1998; 2002; 2006; 2010; 2014; 2018; 2022; 2026; 2030

Flag of Wales until 1953

Wales at the 1934 British Empire Games (abbreviated WAL), has competed in every edition of the Commonwealth Games. Wales had only sent swimmers to the 1930 games and therefore were able to send more athletes this time with the games being in London. The team doubled their medal tally but failed to take a gold medal.

Wales came 8th overall in the games held from 4 to 7 August but runner Reg Thomas did not compete for Wales, because of English objections (he had competed for England at the 1930 British Empire Games). Four of the medals came from the boxing team.

== Medals ==
	(gold)	(silver)	(bronze)	Total
WAL	0	3	3	6

=== Gold ===
None

=== Silver ===
- Albert Barnes, Boxing - Men's Bantamweight Division (54 kg)
- J. D. Jones, Boxing - Men's Featherweight Division (57 kg)
- Frank Taylor, Boxing - Men's Lightweight Division (60 kg)

=== Bronze ===
- Jackie Pottinger, Boxing - Men's Flyweight Division (51 kg)
- Stan Weaver & Thomas Davies - Lawn Bowls - Men's Doubles
- Valerie Davies - Swimming - Women's 100 Yards Backstroke

== Team ==
=== Athletics ===
Athlete	Events	Club	Medals
Jim Alford	880y	Roath Harriers, Cardiff	
Cyril Cupid	100y, 220y	Swansea Valley AC	
Peter Fraser	440y	Achilles Club	
Ken Harris	1 Mile - Men	Roath Harriers, Cardiff	
Arthur Lewis	Shot Put	Exeter Harriers	
Stan Macey	120 Yard Hurdles	Newport AC	
Wilf Short	Marathon	Newport Harriers	
Len Tongue	3 Mile	Newport Harriers	
Frank Whitcutt	High Jump	Newport AC	
Cyril Williams	100y, 220y	Newport AC & Dorset Regiment	

=== Boxing ===
Athlete	Events	Club	Medals
Albert Barnes	bantamweight	Cardiff BC	Silver medal
Alf Ford	middleweight	Pontnewyndd BC	
Vic Horton	welterweight	Maindee BC	
J. D. Jones	featherweight	RWF Tidworth	Silver medal
Jackie Pottinger	flyweight	Cardiff BC	Bronze medal
Frank Taylor	lightweight	Cwmcarn BC	Silver medal
Wally Walters	light-heavyweight	Caerau BC	

=== Cycling ===
Athlete	Events	Club	Medals
Ernest Brown	1,000 yards sprint	Newport Wheelers	
Frank Jones	time trial, scratch	Glamorgan Road Club, Cardiff	

=== Diving ===
Athlete	Events	Club	Medals
Arthur Perrow	10m Platform	Highgate Diving Club	

=== Lawn bowls ===
Athlete	Events	Club	Medals
Thomas Davies	pairs	Swansea BC	Bronze medal
Percy Holloway	singles	Bargoed BC	
William Kent	fours/rinks	Wattstown BC	
Michael Manweiler	fours/rinks	Wattstown BC	
Isaac Rees	fours/rinks	Wattstown BC	
Stan Weaver	pairs	Swansea BC	Bronze medal
R Williams	fours/rinks	Wattstown BC	

=== Swimming ===
Men

Athlete	Events	Club	Medals
Selwyn Capon	100y freestyle, 880y relay	Cardiff SC	
Arthur Davies	800y relay	Cardiff SC	
Ronald Evans	440y freestyle, 800y relay	Swansea SC	
Graham Huxtable	100y freestyle, 100y backstroke	Swansea SC	
Ken Street	100y freestyle, 800y relay	Penarth SC	

Women

Athlete	Events	Club	Medals
Valerie Davies	100y backstroke, 400y relay	Roath Park SC	Bronze medal
Irene Evans	400y relay	Swansea SC	
Peggy Gould	400y relay	Cardiff SC	
Jeanne Greenland	440y freestyle, 400y relay	Newport SC	

=== Wrestling ===
Athlete	Events	Club	Medals
Joseph Burroughs	Lightweight	Newport AC	
Leonard Morgan	Welterweight	Newport AC	

== See also ==
- Wales at the Commonwealth Games
