= James Reilly =

James Reilly may refer to:

- James Reilly (Canadian politician) (1835–1909), Canadian businessman and Mayor of Calgary
- James Reilly (Irish politician) (born 1955), Irish Fine Gael politician
- James Reilly (swimmer) (1890–1962), American swimmer
- James Bernard Reilly (1845–1924), U.S. Representative from Pennsylvania
- James E. Reilly (1948–2008), American television scriptwriter
- James F. Reilly (born 1954), American astronaut and geologist, director of the U.S. Geological Survey
- James Marshall Reilly (born 1981), American entrepreneur, author and public speaker
- James W. Reilly (1828–1905), American Civil War general in the Union Army and Ohio state representative
- Jim Reilly (born 1957), drummer for punk band Stiff Little Fingers
- Jim Reilly (American football) (1948–1994), American football player
- Jim Reilly (Gaelic footballer) (1924–2013), Irish footballer
- Jim Reilly (Illinois politician) (1945–2022), American politician from Illinois
- Joe Reilly (baseball) (James Reilly, 1861–?), American baseball player
- James Reilly (boxer), Scottish boxer

== See also ==
- James Riley (disambiguation)
- James O'Reilly (disambiguation)
