= Angus McGregor =

Scottish boxer

Personal information
- Nationality: British (Scottish)

Sport
- Sport: Boxing
- Event: Featherweight
- Club: Greenock Central ABC

Angus McGregor was a Scottish boxer who competed at the British Empire Games.

== Biography ==
McGregor was a member of the Greenock Central Amateur Boxing Club and lost to Joe Connolly during the 1934 Scottish featherweight Championships, which led to Connolly being named as Scotland's representative for the Empire Games. However, shortly before the Games, Connolly resigned his place due to a disagreement with the Scottish National Sports Federation over his impending application to turn professional and McGregor was named as his replacement.

He subsequently represented the 1934 Scottish team in the featherweight division at the 1934 British Empire Games in London. losing the quarter-final fight to William Fulton of Southern Rhodesia.

After the Games, McGregor turned professional and fought 94 times from 1934 until 1941.
