= William Gunn (runner) =

Scottish athlete (1907–1994)

Personal information
- Nationality: British (Scottish)
- Born: 29 August 1907
- Died: 6 June 1994 (aged 86)

Sport
- Sport: Athletics
- Events: Steeplechase, cross-country
- Club: Plebeian Harriers, Glasgow

William John Gunn (29 August 1907 – 6 June 1994) was a track and field athlete from Scotland who competed at the 1934 British Empire Games (now Commonwealth Games). His name is reported as being Walter on several websites but this is believed to be incorrect.

== Biography ==
Gunn competed in his first Scottish National Championships in March 1926.

Gunn was a member of the Plebeian Harriers in Glasgow and at the 1934 Scottish AAA Championships he won the 2 miles steeplechase title.

He represented the Scottish Empire Games team at the 1934 British Empire Games in London, England, participating in one event, the 2 miles steepelchase.
