= Harry Moy =

British boxer

Personal information
- Nationality: British (English)
- Born: 1911
- Died: 1994

Sport
- Sport: Boxing
- Event: Lightweight
- Club: Lynn BC; Camberwell BC
Medal record
Boxing
Representing England
British Empire Games
Bronze medal – third place	1934 London	lightweight

Harry J. Moy (1911–1994) was a boxer who competed for England.

== Biography ==
Moy lived in Camberwell and boxed out of Lynn BC and then Camberwell BC.

He represented England at the 1934 British Empire Games in London, where he competed in the lightweight division, winning a bronze medal.
