= Thomas P. Campbell (athlete) =

British athlete

Thomas Campbell
Personal information
- Nationality: British (English)

Sport
- Sport: Athletics
- Event: steeplechase
- Club: Salford Harriers

Thomas Patrick Campbell was a male athlete who competed for England at the 1934 British Empire Games.

== Biography ==
Campbell finished second behind Stanley Scarsbrook in the steeplechase event at the 1934 AAA Championships.

Shortly afterwards, he represented England at the 1934 British Empire Games, where he competed in the steeplechase event.
