= J. D. Jones (boxer) =

Welsh boxer

Personal information
- Nationality: British (Welsh)
- Born: 1908

Sport
- Sport: Boxing
- Event: Featherweight
- Club: RWF Tidworth BC
Medal record
Men's Boxing
Representing Wales
British Empire Games
Silver medal – second place	1934 London	featherweight

J. D. Jones (born 1908 – date of death unknown) was a boxer who won a silver medal for Wales at the Commonwealth Games.

== Biography ==
A corporal with the Royal Welch Fusiliers he was based at Senghenydd in the Aber Valley when he won the Army Championship at featherweight in March 1930, for the third consecutive year, having previously won the Championship in both 1928 and 1929.

He represented the Great British Army team against Denmark in January 1931 and reached the final of the presigious A.B.A. featherweight championship but lost out to Benny Caplan of the Polytechnic Boxing Club.

He won a fourth successive army title in 1932 and rose to the rank of sergeant in the Royal Welch Fusiliers, based at Tidworth.

In May 1934, he participated in the Empire Games eliminating series before being selected for the Games and represented the Welsh team at the 1934 British Empire Games in London, where he participated in the featherweight division, losing the gold medal fight to South African Charles Catterall.

After the Games he continued to represent Wales at international level and later became a boxing trainer.
