= John Duus =

English athlete

Personal information
- Nationality: British (English)
- Born: 11 June 1906 Kobe, Japan
- Died: 17 February 1991 (aged 84) Needingworth, Cambridgeshire

Sport
- Sport: Athletics
- Event: javelin
- Club: Manchester AC

John Hercules Duus (1906-1991) was an athlete who competed for England at the 1934 British Empire Games.

== Biography ==
Duus finished third behind Charles Bowen in the javelin event at the 1934 AAA Championships.

Shortly afterwards, he represented England at the 1934 British Empire Games in London, where he competed in the javelin event and was part of the Manchester Athletic Club.
