= Athletics at the 1934 British Empire Games – Men's triple jump =

Men's triple jump at the Commonwealth Games

The men's triple jump event at the 1934 British Empire Games was held on 5 August at the White City Stadium in London, England.

== Results ==
Rank	Name	Nationality	Result	Notes
1st place, gold medalist(s)	Jack Metcalfe	Australia	51 ft 3 1/2 in (15.63 m)	
2nd place, silver medalist(s)	Sam Richardson	Canada	48 ft 0 3/4 in (14.65 m)	
3rd place, bronze medalist(s)	Harold Brainsby	New Zealand	47 ft 11 1/2 in (14.62 m)	
4	Edward Boyce	Northern Ireland	45 ft 3 1/2 in (13.80 m)	
5	John Higginson	England	45 ft 0 3/4 in (13.74 m)	
6	Albert Shillington	Northern Ireland	44 ft 11 in (13.69 m)	
	George Sutherland	Canada	?	
	Alf Gilbert	Canada	?	
	Ray Cooper	Canada	?	
	Arthur Gray	England	?	
	Leslie Butler	England	?	
	F. Turner	England	?	
	Niranjan Singh	India	?	
