= Pat Palmer (boxer) =

Personal information
- Nationality: British (English)
- Born: 28 December 1914 Wandsworth, London
- Died: 1988 (aged 74) Lambeth, London
Medal record
Boxing
Representing England
British Empire Games
Gold medal – first place	1934 London	flyweight

Patrick Alfred Palmer (1914-1988) was an English boxer who competed for England.

== Boxing career ==
Palmer won a gold medal in the flyweight division at the 1934 British Empire Games in London defeating Maxie Berger of Canada in the final on points.

He won the 1934 Amateur Boxing Association British flyweight title, when boxing out of the Battersea & Shexgar ABC.

== Personal life ==
He lived in Battersea.
