= Cyril Cupid =

Welsh athlete

Personal information
- Nationality: British (Welsh)
- Born: January 1908 Swansea, Wales
- Died: June 1965 England

Sport
- Sport: Athletics
- Event: Sprints
- Club: Swansea Valley AC

Cyril George Cupid, (January 1908 – June 1965) was a Welsh athlete, who competed at the 1934 British Empire Games (now Commonwealth Games).

== Biography ==
Cupid was a member of the Swansea Valley Athletics Club. At the 1933 Welsh national championships, Cupid won the 100 yards title and the following year at the 1934 championships held in Newport, he won both the 100 and 200 yards titles, setting a Welsh record of 9.4-5sec in the former.

He represented Wales at the 1934 British Empire Games in two athletic events; the 100 yards and the 220 yards.

In 1936, Cupid was described as being Wales' greatest ever sprinter.
