= Frank Taylor (boxer) =

Welsh boxer

Personal information
- Nationality: British (Welsh)

Sport
- Sport: Boxing
- Event: Lightweight
- Club: Cwmcarn BC; Monmouth BC; Risca BC
Medal record
Boxing
Representing Wales
British Empire Games
Silver medal – second place	1934 London	lightweight

Norman Frank Taylor was a boxer who competed for Wales and won a silver medal at the British Empire Games.

== Biography ==
Taylor was best known for representing Wales at the 1934 British Empire Games, where he won the silver medal in the lightweight division at the 1934 British Empire Games in London, losing to gold medallist Leonard Cook in the final.

He boxed out of the Cwmcarn BC but later boxed out of Risca BC and Monmouth BC and was the 1936 middleweight champion of Wales.
