= Leslie Butler (athlete) =

English athlete

Personal information
- Nationality: British (English)
- Born: 1912 Kent, England
- Died: 1980 (aged 67–68) Queensland, Australia

Sport
- Sport: Athletics
- Event: triple jump
- Club: Blackheath Harriers

Leslie Donald Butler (1912 – 1980) was an English athlete who competed for England.

== Biography ==
Butler finished third behind Edward Boyce (athlete) in the triple jump event at the 1934 AAA Championships.

Shortly afterwards, he represented England at the 1934 British Empire Games in the long jump and triple jump events.
