= James McKillop (boxer) =

Scottish boxer and athlete

Personal information
- Nationality: British (Scottish)

Sport
- Sport: Boxing / Athletics
- Event: middleweight / Javelin
- Club: Motherwell BC (boxing) / Milocarian AC (athletics)

James A. McKillop was a boxer and javelin thrower who competed for Scotland at the British Empire Games and was the champion of Great Britain in the javelin throw.

== Biography ==
McKillop represented Scotland at the 1934 British Empire Games, where he fought in the middleweight division at the 1934 British Empire Games in London, losing to eventual silver medallist Leonard Wadsworth from Canada.

He boxed out of the Motherwell club and was a member of the Police force in 1936. In 1938 McKillop took up the javelin throw and was able to join the Milocarian Athletic Club due to him being at the Royal Military Academy at the time.

McKillop became the British javelin throw champion after winning the British AAA Championships title at the 1939 AAA Championships.
