= 1939 AAA Championships =

Outdoor track and field competition

- Dates: 7–8 July 1939
- Host city: London, England
- Venue: White City Stadium
- Level: Senior
- Type: Outdoor
- Events: 25

The 1939 AAA Championships was the 1939 edition of the annual outdoor track and field competition organised by the Amateur Athletic Association (AAA). It was held from 7 to 8 July 1939 at White City Stadium in London, England. The attendance was 20,300.

== Summary ==
The Championships consisted of 25 events and covered two days of competition.

It was the last championships to be held for six years following the outbreak of World War II shortly after the 1939 championships. The 1939 competitors Arthur Sweeney and Julien Saelens were among those to lose their lives during the war.

Jack Emery broke the British record when winning the 3 miles event and Sydney Wooderson won his fifth consecutive 1 mile event.

== Results ==
Event	Gold		Silver		Bronze	
100 yards	Arthur Sweeney	9.9	Cyril Holmes	inches	John Cumberbatch	2 ft
220 yards	Cyril Holmes	21.9	Arthur Sweeney	1 ft	(Belgium) Julien Saelens	1 ft
440 yards	Alan Pennington	48.8	Henry Pack	49.4	Rowland Palmer	49.9
880 yards	Godfrey Brown	1:55.1	John Moreton	1:55.1	Austin Littler	1:55.4
1 mile	Sydney Wooderson	4:11.8	Denis Pell	4:12.0	Arthur Collyer	4:15.0
3 miles	Jack Emery	14:08.0 BR	Peter Ward	14:08.6	Aubrey Reeve	14:11.6
6 miles	(Wales) Samuel Palmer	30:06.4	Reginald Walker	30:09.4	(Belgium) Jean Chapelle	30:40.4
10 miles	(Belgium) Jean Chapelle	51:56.0	Lawrence Weatherill	52:25.2	Charles Carter	52:54.0
marathon	(Scotland) Donald Robertson	2:35:37.0	Squire Yarrow	2:37:50.0	(South Africa) Tommy Lalande	2:44:01.0
steeplechase	(Belgium) Jean Chapelle	10:22.4	Anthony Etheridge	10:29.0	(Scotland) William Wylie	10:36.6
120y hurdles	(Netherlands) Jan Brasser	14.7	Thomas Lockton	½ yd	Frederick Scopes	4-8 yd
440y hurdles	(Belgium) Juul Bosmans	54.9	(Greece) Christos Mantikas	2½-4 yd	Rowland Palmer	6-7 yd
2 miles walk	Harry Churcher	13:50.0	Bert Cooper	14:05.4	Hew Neilson	14:11.2
7 miles walk	Harry Churcher	52:37.0	Eddie Staker	53:31.4	Joe Coleman	54:32.2
high jump	John Lunn Newman	1.880	Hubert Stubbs	1.829	(Republic of Ireland) Richard O'Rafferty; Eric Pierre	1.829
pole vault	Dick Webster	3.73	Douglas Redsull	3.66	(Scotland) Alexander Gibson	3.50
long jump	William Breach	7.21	Harry Askew	7.14	Harry Lister	7.13
triple jump	(Greece) Ioannis Palamiotis	15.03	(Netherlands) Willem Peters	14.58	F. Whalston	13.95
shot put	(Netherlands) Aad de Bruyn	14.79	Robert Howland	13.74	(Republic of Ireland) Leonard Horan	13.35
discus throw	(Greece) Nikolaos Syllas	49.12	(Netherlands) Aad de Bruyn	42.38	(Northern Ireland) James Nesbitt	41.76
hammer throw	(Republic of Ireland) Bert Healion	49.28	Norman Drake	46.76	(Scotland) Duncan Clark	44.19
javelin throw	(Scotland) James McKillop	56.88	E. W. Hibbard	50.64	Charles A. Melchior	50.01
Tug of war (catchweight)	(Northern Ireland) Royal Ulster Constabulary		Sharlston West Colliery		Royal Army Service Corps (Feltham)	
Tug of war (110st)	(Northern Ireland) Royal Ulster Constabulary		Royal Army Service Corps (Feltham)			
440 yards relay	Blackheath Harriers	43.4sec	Herne Hill Harriers	inches	Polytechnic Harriers	2 yd

== See also ==
- 1939 WAAA Championships
