= Maurice Hintze =

English male athlete

Personal information
- Nationality: British (English)
- Born: 9 October 1912 Barnet, England
- Died: 15 January 1950 (aged 37) Aylesbury, England

Sport
- Sport: Athletics
- Event: Sprints
- Club: Polytechnic Harriers

Maurice Alexander Hintze (9 October 1912 – 15 January 1950) was a male athlete who competed for England.

== Biography ==
Hintze was born in Barnet, England and was a member of the Polytechnic Harriers.

His performance at the 1934 British Games at White City earned consideration for slection for the 1934 Empire Games. He subsequently represented England at the 1934 British Empire Games in London, where he competed in the 220 yards event.
