= John Gabriel (athlete) =

English hurdler

Personal information
- Nationality: British (English)
- Born: 13 January 1911 Chertsey, Surrey, England
- Died: 24 February 1941 (aged 30) At sea

Sport
- Sport: Athletics
- Event: Hurdles
- Club: London Univ AC; London Athletic Club

John Parton Gabriel (13 January 1911 – 24 February 1941) was a male athlete who competed for England.

== Biography ==
Gabriel was born in Chertsey, Surrey, England and studied at the University of London.

He represented England at the 1934 British Empire Games in London, where he competed in the 120 yard hurdles event.

He served as an intelligence officer in France and spoke fluent German, French and good Russian. He served as a captain in the Royal Berkshire Regiment before being transferred to Special Operations Executive and special reconnaissance duty with GHQ Liaison Regiment. He died after the British steam merchant ship Jonathan Holt was sunk by U-97 en route from Liverpool to Takoradi.
