= Sepp Paar =

German wrestler

Personal information
- Nationality: German
- Born: 6 March 1913 Piding, Germany
- Died: 21 September 1997 (aged 84) Piding, Germany

Sport
- Sport: Wrestling

Sepp Paar (6 March 1913 – 21 September 1997) was a German wrestler. He competed in the men's freestyle welterweight at the 1936 Summer Olympics.
