= August Kukk =

Estonian wrestler

Personal information
- Nationality: Estonian
- Born: 24 April 1908 Kirbla, Estonia
- Died: 5 April 1988 (aged 79) Tallinn, Estonia

Sport
- Sport: Wrestling

August Kukk (24 April 1908 – 5 April 1988) was an Estonian wrestler. He competed in the men's freestyle welterweight at the 1936 Summer Olympics.
