= Hüseyin Erçetin =

Turkish wrestler

Personal information
- Nationality: Turkish
- Born: 4 October 1911 Beypazarı, Turkey
- Died: 25 April 1993 (aged 81) Ankara, Turkey

Sport
- Sport: Wrestling

Hüseyin Erçetin (4 October 1911 – 25 April 1993) was a Turkish wrestler. He competed in the men's freestyle welterweight at the 1936 Summer Olympics.
