= George Pallett =

British athlete

Personal information
- Nationality: British (English)
- Born: 6 November 1907 London, England
- Died: 26 March 1996 (aged 89) Western Australia, Australia

Sport
- Sport: Athletics
- Event: long jump
- Club: Herne Hill Harriers

George James Pallett (6 November 1907 – 26 March 1996) was a male athlete who competed for England at the 1934 British Empire Games.

== Biography ==
Pallett finished third behind Frenchman Robert Paul in the long jump event at the 1934 AAA Championships. Shortly afterwards, he represented England at the 1934 British Empire Games in the long jump.

Pallett was a president of the Herne Hill Harriers and was a qualified AAA coach in all field events.
