= Geoffrey Blake (athlete) =

English sprinter (1914–1991)

Personal information
- Nationality: British (English)
- Born: 9 April 1914 England
- Died: 1991 (aged 76–77) England

Sport
- Sport: Athletics
- Event: 400m/440y
- Club: Univ of London AC
Medal record
Men's Athletics
Representing England
British Empire Games
Gold medal – first place	1934 London	4×440 yards

Geoffrey Noel Blake (9 April 1914 – 1991) was an English athlete who competed in the 1934 British Empire Games.

== Biography ==
Blake finished third behind Godfrey Rampling in the 440 yards event at the 1934 AAA Championships.

Shortly afterwards, he represented England at the 1934 British Empire Games, where he was a member of the English relay team with Denis Rathbone, Crew Stoneley and Godfrey Rampling, which won the gold medal in the 4×440 yards event. In the 440 yards competition he was eliminated in the semi-finals.
