= John O'Hara (wrestler) =

Australian wrestler

Personal information
- Nationality: Australian
- Born: 12 September 1913 Melbourne, Australia
- Died: 29 December 1983 (aged 70) Sydney, Australia

Sport
- Sport: Wrestling

John O'Hara (12 September 1913 – 29 December 1983) was an Australian wrestler. He competed in the men's freestyle welterweight at the 1936 Summer Olympics.
