= Arthur Furze =

British athlete

Personal information
- Nationality: British (English)
- Born: 16 July 1903 Watford, England
- Died: 20 December 1982 (aged 79) Watford, England

Sport
- Sport: Athletics
- Event: long-distance
- Club: Waford Harriers
Medal record
Athletes
Representing England
British Empire Games
Bronze medal – third place	1934 London	6 miles

Arthur Frank Furze (16 July 1903 – 20 December 1982) was a male athlete who competed for England.

== Biography ==
Furze finished second behind John Potts in the 6 miles event at the 1932 AAA Championships. and finished third behind Jack Holden in the 6 miles event at the 1934 AAA Championships.

Furze won a bronze medal in the 6 miles at the 1934 British Empire Games in London. At the 1931 Workers' Olympiad in Vienna Furze finished second in the 5,000 and 10,000 meter races.
