= George Brennan (boxer) =

English boxer (born 1911)

Personal information
- Nationality: British (English)
- Born: 25 February 1911 Belgium

Sport
- Club: Nottingham Police ABC
Medal record
Boxing
Representing England
British Empire Games
Gold medal – first place	1934 London	light heavyweight

Jules George Brennan (born 25 February 1911) was a Belgian-born English boxer who competed for England.

== Boxing career ==
Brennan won a gold medal in the light heavyweight division at the 1934 British Empire Games in London.

He defeated George Holton of Scotland in the final by knockout, after an eventful semi final bout against Robey Leibbrandt. Leibbrandt floored Brennan with a low blow during the fight and as Brennan rose he received a blow to the jaw. The referee consulted the judges and Leibbrandt was disqualified.

He won the Amateur Boxing Association 1933 and 1934 light heavyweight title, when boxing out of the Nottingham Police ABC. Following the success he turned professional in August 1934 and continued to fight up until 1946.

== Personal life ==
Brennan lived in Derbyshire and was a member of the Nottingham Police force.
