= Tommy Lalande =

South African long-distance runner

Personal information
- Nationality: South African
- Born: 31 December 1904 Durban, Colony of Natal, South Africa
- Died: 31 January 1983 (aged 78) Poole, England

Sport
- Sport: Long-distance running
- Event: Marathon

Thomas Forcer Lalande (31 December 1904 – 31 January 1983) was a South African long-distance runner who competed at the 1936 Summer Olympics.

== Biography ==
Lalande finished third behind Donald Robertson (athlete) in the marathon event at the 1934 AAA Championships.

At the 1936 Olympic Games in Berlin, he competed in the marathon.

Lalande finished third behind Donald Robertson in the marathon event at the 1939 AAA Championships before his career was interrupted by World War II.
