= Jaakko Pietilä =

Finnish wrestler

Personal information
- Nationality: Finnish
- Born: 25 August 1912 Ilmajoki, Finland
- Died: 29 April 1983 (aged 70) Ilmajoki, Finland

Sport
- Sport: Wrestling

Jaakko Pietilä (25 August 1912 – 29 April 1983) was a Finnish wrestler. He competed in the men's freestyle welterweight at the 1936 Summer Olympics.
