= Billy Duncan =

Northern Irish boxer

Personal information
- Nationality: British (Northern Irish)

Sport
- Sport: Boxing
- Event: Welterweight
- Club: Royal Ulster Constabulary
Medal record
Boxing
Representing Northern Ireland
British Empire Games
Bronze medal – third place	1934 London	welterweight

William Duncan was a boxer who competed for Northern Ireland and won a bronze medal at the British Empire Games. He was one of only three medallists at the games for Northern Ieland.

== Biography ==
Ducan was best known for representing Northern Ireland at the 1934 British Empire Games, where he won the bronze medal in the welterweight division at the 1934 British Empire Games in London, losing to eventual silver medallist Dick Barton in the semi-final.

Duncan was a member of the Royal Ulster Constabulary but in 1945, he resigned from the RUC after spenidng 13 years with them.

He boxed out of the RUC club during his time as a boxer and was the champion of Ulster in 1933 and 1934.
