= John Michie (athlete) =

British athlete

Personal information
- Nationality: British (Scottish)
- Born: 25 October 1908
- Died: 1983 (aged 74–75)

Sport
- Sport: Athletics
- Event: high jump
- Club: South London Harriers
Medal record
Men's Athletics
Representing Scotland
British Empire Games
Bronze medal – third place	1934 London	High jump

John Fraser Michie (25 October 1908 – 1983) was a Scottish athlete who competed in the 1934 British Empire Games and won a bronze medal.

== Biography ==
At the 1933 Scottish AAA Championships, Michie won the high jump title. He finished second behind Mihály Bodosi in the high jump event at the 1934 AAA Championships.

Shortly afterwards, he represented Scotland at the 1934 British Empire Games. At the Games in London, he won the bronze medal in the high jump event. In the 440 yards competition, he was eliminated in the heats.
