= Eddie Ryan (boxer) =

English boxer

Personal information
- Nationality: British (English)
- Born: 5 September 1912 Peckham, England
- Died: 1978 (aged 66) Camberwell, England

Sport
- Sport: Boxing
- Event: Bantamweight
- Club: Lynn AC
Medal record
Boxing
Representing England
British Empire Games
Gold medal – first place	1934 London	bantamweight

Edwin Thomas Ryan (1912-1978) was an English boxer who competed for England.

== Boxing career ==
Ryan boxed out of Lynn AC.

He represented England at the 1934 British Empire Games in London, where he competed in the Bantamweight division, winning a gold medal.

Ryan was the ABA bantamweight runner-up to Welshman Albert Barnes in 1934 but defeated Barnes on points in the Empire Games final. He stepped up in weight to featherweight the following year (1935) and won the ABA Championship. Known as the Peckham Pulverizer, he defeated Johnny Cabello, a New York Puerto Rican in the New York Golden Gloves tournament during 1935. On 8 December 1935, in the Oslo Colosseum, he fought Kr. Torvund in England's first match against Norway.

== Personal life ==
He was a warehouse labourer and painter by trade and lived at 22 Horny Broad, Peckham in 1935.
