= Julien Beke =

Belgian wrestler (1914–1992)

Personal information
- Nationality: Belgian
- Born: 11 February 1914 Ghent, Belgium
- Died: 2 January 1992 (aged 77) Warwickshire, England

Sport
- Sport: Wrestling

Julien Beke (11 February 1914 – 2 January 1992) was a Belgian wrestler. He competed in the men's freestyle welterweight at the 1936 Summer Olympics.
