= Douglas Bell (athlete) =

English discus thrower (1908–1944)

Personal information
- Nationality: British (English)
- Born: 4 November 1908 Foots Cray, Kent, England
- Died: 19 October 1944 (aged 35) Swindon, Wiltshire, England

Sport
- Sport: Athletics
- Event: discus
- Club: Achilles Club
Medal record
Men's athletics
Representing England
British Empire Games
Silver medal – second place	1934 London	Discus throw

Douglas Richmond Bell (4 November 1908 – 19 October 1944) was an English track and field athlete who competed in the 1934 British Empire Games and won a silver medal.

== Biography ==
Bell finished second behind Patrick Bermingham in the discus throw event at the 1934 AAA Championships. Shortly afterwards, he represented England at the 1934 British Empire Games. where he won the silver medal in the discus throw event and finished fifth in the hammer throw competition.

Bell finished third behind Bernarr Prendergast in the discus throw event at the 1936 AAA Championships.

Captain Bell died in service with the York and Lancaster Regiment in World War II
