= William Fox (wrestler) =

English wrestler (1912–1999)

Bill Fox
Personal information
- Nationality: British (English)
- Born: 9 August 1912 Manchester, England
- Died: 6 March 1999 (aged 86)

Sport
- Sport: Wrestling
- Event: Welterweight
- Club: Manchester YMCA
Medal record
Men's freestyle wrestling
Representing England
British Empire Games
Silver medal – second place	1934 London	Welterweight

William "Bill" Fox (9 August 1912 – 6 March 1999) was an English freestyle sport wrestler who competed for Great Britain at the 1936 Summer Olympics.

== Biography ==
Fox was born in Manchester, England,. and represented England at the 1934 British Empire Games in London, where he competed in the welterweight event, winning a silver medal. At the 1934 Empire Games he won the silver medal in the freestyle welterweight class.

In 1936 he competed in the freestyle welterweight tournament.

Fox was a three-times welterweight winner of the British Wrestling Championships in 1934, 1936 and 1937.
