= George Saunders (athlete) =

British athlete

Personal information
- Nationality: British (English)
- Born: 29 November 1907 England
- Died: 14 November 1996 (aged 88) England

Sport
- Sport: Athletics
- Event: Sprints
- Club: Polytechnic Harriers
Medal record
Men's Athletics
Representing England
British Empire Games
Gold medal – first place	1934 London	4×110 yards

George Thomas Saunders (29 November 1907- 14 November 1996) was an English athlete who won a gold medal at the 1934 British Empire Games and was a British champion in the 100 yards.

== Biography ==
Saunders became the national 100 yards champion after winning the British AAA Championships title at the 1933 AAA Championships.

At the 1934 British Empire Games he was a member of the English relay team with Everard Davis, Walter Rangeley and Arthur Sweeney, which won the gold medal in the 4×110 yards event. In the 100 yards competition he finished fourth.
