= Alois Samec =

Czech wrestler

Personal information
- Nationality: Czech
- Born: 12 February 1906

Sport
- Country: Czechoslovakia
- Sport: Wrestling

Alois Samec (born 12 February 1906, date of death unknown) was a Czech wrestler. He competed for Czechoslovakia in the men's freestyle welterweight at the 1936 Summer Olympics.
