= James O'Reilly (judge) =

James W. O’Reilly (born November 13, 1955) is a former Judge of the Federal Court (Canada) and the current Senate Ethics Officer in the Senate of Canada.

He graduated with a Bachelor of Arts (Honours) from the University of Western Ontario before obtaining his Bachelor of Laws from Osgoode Hall Law School and a Master of Laws from the University of Ottawa.

O'Reilly was called to the bar in Ontario in 1985 and went on to have a varied legal career, serving as Consultant at the Law Reform Commission of Canada (now the Law Commission of Canada), Legal Advisor in the Department of Justice (Canada), sole practitioner specializing in legal policy and law reform, Executive Legal Officer at the Supreme Court of Canada, Associate Executive Director at the National Judicial Institute, and Counsel to the Collusion Investigation in London, England. He is an author of many publications and has taught at various universities and law schools across Canada.

He was appointed to the Federal Court of Canada (now the Federal Court) in 2002 and the Court Martial Appeal Court of Canada in 2003; he was a Member of the Court until January 9, 2025.

O'Reilly was the President of the Canadian Institute for the Administration of Justice (CIAJ) from 2019-2021, and has served as co-chair of CIAJ's Judgment Writing Seminar. He is also a Fellow of McLaughlin College at York University and the recipient of the 2023-2024 Inns of Court Judicial Fellowship at the University Of London's Institute of Advanced Legal Studies.

On January 10, 2025, O'Reilly was appointed Senate Ethics Officer by the Prime Minister, Justin Trudeau.
