= Richard Wallace (athlete) =

British athlete

Personal information
- Nationality: British (Scottish)

Sport
- Sport: Athletics
- Event: 400m
- Club: Stewart's College FP
Medal record
Men's Athletics
Representing Scotland
British Empire Games
Bronze medal – third place	1934 London	4 × 440 yards relay

Richard H. H. Wallace was a Scottish athlete who competed and won a bronze medal at the 1934 British Empire Games (now Commonwealth Games).

== Biography ==
Wallace competed in the 440 yards events and 4 × 440 yards relay at the 1934 British Empire Games in London, England. He won a bronze medal as part of the Scottish Empire Games team in the relay.

He was a pupil at Daniel Stewart's College and later was a member of the Stewart's College Former Pupils athletic club. He was the 1933 Scottish champion over 440 yards.
