= Art Ravensdale =

Canadian hurdler

Personal information
- Full name: Arthur Ravensdale
- Nationality: Canadian
- Born: 5 January 1911
- Died: 15 November 1975 (aged 64)

Sport
- Sport: Track and field
- Event: 110 metres hurdles

Arthur Ravensdale (5 January 1911 – 15 November 1975) was a Canadian hurdler. He competed in the men's 110 metres hurdles at the 1932 Summer Olympics. He was also the Canadian national champion in sprinting in 1931. An attendee of Marquette University, he set a world record for 120-yard low hurdles in 1932 at 13.2 seconds.
