= Shoichi Masutomi =

Japanese freestyle wrestler

Personal information
- Nationality: Japanese
- Born: 12 January 1912

Sport
- Sport: Wrestling

Shoichi Masutomi (増富 省一, Masutomi Shōichi; born 12 January 1912, date of death unknown) was a Japanese wrestler. He competed in the men's freestyle welterweight at the 1936 Summer Olympics.
