= Rashid Anwar =

Indian wrestler (1910–1983)

Personal information
- Born: 12 April 1910
- Died: 1983 (aged 72–73) Camden, Greater London

Professional wrestling career

Rashid Anwar
Medal record

Men's Freestyle wrestling

British Empire Games
Bronze medal – third place	1934 London	Welterweight

Rashid Mian Anwar (12 April 1910 – 1983) was an Indian freestyle sport wrestler who competed in the 1936 Summer Olympics.

In 1936 he competed in the Freestyle welterweight tournament. At the 1934 Empire Games he won the bronze medal in the freestyle welterweight class. He was the first Indian to win a medal at the British Empire Games/Commonwealth Games. He died at the age of 73 in Camden, Greater London.
