= Ashleigh Pilbrow =

British hurdler (1912–1995)

Personal information
- Nationality: British (English)
- Born: 1 July 1912 Barnet, England
- Died: 2 May 1995 (aged 82) Beaulieu, Hampshire, England

Sport
- Sport: Athletics
- Event: hurdles
- Club: University of Oxford AC; Achilles Club
Medal record
Men's athletics
Representing England
British Empire Games
Bronze medal – third place	1934 London	120 yd hurdles

Ashleigh Gordon Pilbrow (1 July 1912 – 2 May 1995) was an English Track and field athlete who competed for Great Britain in the 1936 Summer Olympics.

== Biography ==
Pilbrow born in Barnet, studied at Queen's College, Oxford.

At the 1934 British Empire Games in London, he represented England and won the bronze medal in the 120 yards hurdles competition. In the 440 yards hurdles contest he finished sixth. The following year, he finished third behind Don Finlay in the 120 yards hurdles event at the 1935 AAA Championships.

After finishing third behind Don Finlay again in the 120 yards hurdles event at the 1936 AAA Championships, he was selected to represent Great Britain at the 1936 Olympic Games held in Berlin, where he was eliminated in the first round of the Olympic 110 metre hurdles event.

He died in Beaulieu, Hampshire.
