= Willy Angst =

Swiss wrestler

Personal information
- Nationality: Swiss
- Born: 20 November 1913

Sport
- Sport: Wrestling

Willy Angst (born 20 November 1913, date of death unknown) was a Swiss amateur wrestling. He competed at the 1936 Summer Olympics and the 1948 Summer Olympics.
