= Albert Barnes (boxer) =

Wales boxer

Personal information
- Nationality: British (Welsh)
- Born: 2 July 1913 Cardiff, Wales
- Died: 8 July 1990 (aged 77) Cardiff, Wales

Sport
- Sport: boxing
Medal record
Men's Boxing
Representing Wales
British Empire Games
Silver medal – second place	1934 London	Bantamweight

Albert Richard Barnes (2 July 1913 – 8 July 1990) was a Welsh boxer who competed for Great Britain in the 1936 Summer Olympics.

== Biography ==
Barnes won the 1934, 1936 and 1937 Amateur Boxing Association British bantamweight titles, when boxing out of the Cardiff City ABC. He had previously won the Welsh ABA featherweight championship in 1930 boxing for Cardiff Central.

At the 1934 British Empire Games in London he won the silver medal in the bantamweight class after losing the final to Eddie Ryan of England. The following year he defeated Petey Scalzo of New York in the New York Golden Gloves tournament during 1935.

In 1936 he was eliminated in the second round of the bantamweight class during the 1936 Olympic Games, after losing his fight to the upcoming bronze medalist Fidel Ortiz of Mexico.
