= Mihály Bodosi =

Hungarian athlete

Personal information
- Nationality: Hungarian
- Born: 13 December 1909 Barót, Austria-Hungary
- Died: 21 March 2005 (aged 95) Kaposvár, Hungary
- Height: 176 cm (5 ft 9 in)
- Weight: 72 kg (159 lb)

Sport
- Sport: Athletics
- Event: High jump
- Club: BBTE, Budapest

Mihály Jenő Bodosi (13 December 1909 – 21 March 2005) was a Hungarian athlete who competed at the 1936 Summer Olympics.

== Biography ==
Bodosi won the British AAA Championships title in the high jump event at the British 1933 AAA Championships and the 1934 AAA Championships.

At the 1936 Olympic Games in Berlin, he competed in the men's high jump.
