= Bob Dixon (athlete) =

Canadian javelin thrower

Medal record

Men's athletics

Representing Canada

British Empire Games
Gold medal – first place	1934 London	Javelin

Robert Samuel Dixon (30 December 1909 – 11 January 1941) was a Canadian track and field athlete who competed in the javelin throw.

In a comparatively weak field, he won the gold medal at the 1934 British Empire Games ahead of the local opposition in London, throwing 60.02 m (196 ft 10 3/4 in) to beat South Africa's Harry Hart (who was winner of the shot put and discus that year).

At national level, he won one javelin title at the Canadian Track and Field Championships, topping the podium in 1934.

Dixon spent time in the Vancouver Police Force and played lacrosse with the New Westminster Salmonbellies with whom he competed for the Mann Cup in 1930. He also coached the Canadian lacrosse team at the 1932 Summer Olympics.

At one point, he enrolled in a school for machine gunners near Los Angeles and joined a group of California-based mercenaries and headed to China.

Dixon did two tours as a pilot in China, and allegedly became the right-hand man of influential Chinese warlord Zhang Zuolin, according to newspaper reports.

Dixon's time in China also included a stint with the Chinese Airforce during the Sino-Japanese War. He returned to Canada when war was declared in Canada and immediately enlisted in the Royal Canadian Air Force.

Serving as a test pilot in the RCAF, he died in an airplane crash in Grosse Isle, Manitoba during World War II. He was later inducted into the Richmond Sports Wall of Fame.
