= Edward Boyce (athlete) =

British long and triple jumper

Personal information
- Nationality: British (Northern Irish)
- Born: 2 June 1913 Belfast, Northern Ireland
- Died: 26 March 1988 (aged 74) Derriaghy, Northern Ireland

Sport
- Sport: Athletics
- Event: Long jump
- Club: North Belfast Harriers

Edward Boyce (2 June 1913 – 26 March 1988) was a British and Northern Irish athlete who competed at the 1936 Summer Olympics.

== Biography ==
Boyce finished third behind Lajos Balogh in the long jump event and third behind Jan Blankers in the triple jump event at the 1933 AAA Championships.

Boyce became the national triple jump champion after winning the British AAA Championships title at the 1934 AAA Championships. Shortly afterwards, he represented Northern Ireland at the 1934 British Empire Games, finishing fourth in the triple jump event.

After finishing third behind Australian Jack Metcalfe in the triple event at the 1936 AAA Championships, he was selected to represent Great Britain at the 1936 Olympic Games held in Berlin, where he competed in the men's long jump and the men's triple jump competitions.

Boyce regained his AAA triple jump title at the 1938 AAA Championships.
