= Jackie Pottinger =

Welsh boxer

Personal information
- Nationality: British (Welsh)
- Born: 1913 Cardiff
- Died: 1979 South Glamorgan
Medal record
Boxing
Representing Wales
British Empire Games
Bronze medal – third place	1934 London	flyweight

John Mitchell Baker Pottinger (1913-1979) was a boxer who competed for Wales.

== Boxing career ==
Pottinger won a bronze medal in the flyweight division at the 1934 British Empire Games in London. He lost to Georgie Coyle of New York in the New York Golden Gloves tournament during 1935.

He won the 1938 Amateur Boxing Association British bantamweight title, when boxing out of the Cardiff Gas BC.

== Personal life ==
He was a manufacturer by trade and lived at 97 Ferry Road, Grangetown, Cardiff in 1935.
