= Bernarr Prendergast =

Jamaican discus thrower (1911–1966)

Personal information
- Nationality: British / Jamaican
- Born: 25 December 1911 Kingston, Jamaica
- Died: 30 October 1966 (aged 54) Kingston, Jamaica

Sport
- Sport: Athletics
- Event: discus
- Club: St. Mary's Hospital, London
Medal record
Representing Jamaica
British Empire Games
Bronze medal – third place	1934 London	Discus throw

Bernarr Leopold Sandow Prendergast (25 December 1911 – 30 October 1966) was a British/Jamaican track and field athlete who competed for Great Britain in the 1936 Summer Olympics.

== Biography ==
Born in Kingston, Jamaica, Prendergast was of British descent. He studied medicine in London, at St Mary's Hospital Medical School, from 1933 to 1942.

Prendergast won a bronze medal in the men's discus throw competition at the 1934 British Empire Games in London represting Jamaica.

Prendergast won the British AAA Championships title in the discus event at the 1936 AAA Championships.

One month later he was selected to represent Great Britain at the 1936 Olympic Games held in Berlin because Jamaica had no participation in the Games at the time. In the discus throw event he did not qualify for the final, and his exact result is unknown. He had a personal best of 44.16 m (144 ft 10 1/2 in).

While training for the 1934 Empire Games, Prendergast was involved in an accident involving a javelin that caused an injury to a Japanese athlete called Sadako Yamamoto who was training for the World Games. The incident at the White City Stadium distressed Prendergast to the point that he initially withdrew from the 1934 Games.
