= Joe Schleimer =

Canadian wrestler (1909–1988)

Personal information
- Born: May 31, 1909 Mississauga, Ontario, Canada
- Died: November 23, 1988 (aged 79) Mississauga, Ontario, Canada

Professional wrestling career
- Sport: Wrestling
- Event: Freestyle
Medal record
Men's freestyle wrestling
Representing Canada
Olympic Games
Bronze medal – third place	1936 Berlin	Welterweight
British Empire Games
Gold medal – first place	1934 London	Welterweight

Joseph Schleimer (May 31, 1909 – November 23, 1988) was a Canadian freestyle wrestler. He was born in Mississauga, Ontario. In 1936, he won the bronze medal in the welterweight division at the Berlin Olympics. At the 1934 Empire Games, he won the gold medal in the freestyle welterweight class. He also won the Canadian Wrestling Championships in 1934, 1935 and 1936.

Joseph Schleimer would later serve as coach for the Canadian Wrestling Team. Events he coached at include the 1959 Pan-American Games, 1962 Commonwealth Games, 1962 World Championships, 1963 Pan American Games, and the 1964 Summer Olympics.

Always active with Canadian Wrestling community he was the Chrairman of the Wrestling Committee AAUC from 1960 to 1964 and President of the Ontario amateur Wrestling Federation from 1955 to 1960. He was also the Wrestling Coach for the Broadview YMCA from 1950 to 1971 and served as the Director of the Canadian amateur Wrestling Association for many years.
