= Chuck Bowen =

Baseball player in the Negro leagues

- Pitcher/Outfielder
- Batted: Unknown Threw: Unknown

Negro league baseball debut
- 1937, for the Indianapolis Athletics

Last appearance
- 1937, for the Indianapolis Athletics
- Stats at Baseball Reference

Teams
- Indianapolis Athletics (1937)

Charles Bowen was an American professional baseball pitcher and outfielder in the Negro leagues. He played with the Indianapolis Athletics in 1937. He attended Wilberforce University.
