= Jean Jourlin =

French wrestler

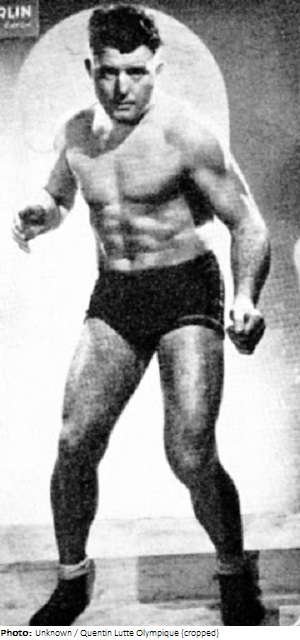

Personal information
- Nationality: French
- Born: 1 December 1904 Tarare, France
- Died: 2 October 1979 (aged 74) Bry-sur-Marne, France

Sport
- Sport: Wrestling

Jean Jourlin (1 December 1904 – 2 October 1979) was a French wrestler. He competed at the 1928 Summer Olympics and the 1936 Summer Olympics.
