= Thure Andersson =

Swedish wrestler (1907–1976)

Medal record

Men's freestyle wrestling

Representing Sweden

Olympic Games
Silver medal – second place	1936 Berlin	Welterweight

Thure Andersson (1907–1976) was a Swedish wrestler. He was born in Ölme. He won an Olympic silver medal in Freestyle wrestling in 1936.
