= David Brownlee =

British athlete

Personal information
- Nationality: British (Scottish)

Sport
- Sport: Athletics
- Event: Sprints
- Club: Springburn Harriers
Medal record
Men's Athletics
Representing Scotland
British Empire Games
Bronze medal – third place	1934 London	4×110 yards

David A. Brownlee was a Scottish athlete who competed and won a bronze medal at the 1934 British Empire Games (now Commonwealth Games).

== Biography ==
Brownlee attended Keil School in Dumbarton and won the 100 yards Scottish Junior championship in 1931.

He competed in the 100 yards, 220 yards events and 4 × 110 yards relay at the 1934 British Empire Games in London, England. He won a bronze medal as part of the Scottish Empire Games team in the relay.

He ran for the Springburn Harriers of Glasgow and Bishopbriggs.
