= Marthinus Theunissen =

South African sprinter

Medal record

Men's Athletics

Representing South Africa

British Empire Games
Silver medal – second place	1934 London	100 yards
Silver medal – second place	1934 London	220 yards

Marthinus Wilhelminus S. Theunissen (13 May 1911 – 31 July 1983) was a South African athlete who competed in the 1936 Summer Olympics. He was born in Standerton.

In 1936 he was eliminated in the semi-finals of the 200 metres event and in the quarter-finals of the 100 metres competition. He was also a member of the South African team which was eliminated in the first round of the 4x100 metre relay contest. At the 1934 Empire Games he won the silver medal in the 100 yards event as well as in the 220 yards competition.
