= Fred Woodhouse =

Australian pole vaulter (1912–1998)

Personal information
- Nationality: Australian
- Born: 13 June 1912
- Died: 8 July 1998 (aged 86)

Sport
- Sport: Athletics
- Event: pole vault
Medal record
Representing Australia
British Empire Games
| Bronze medal – third place | 1934 London | Pole vault |

Frederick Irvine Woodhouse (13 June 1912 – 8 July 1998) was an Australian track and field athlete who competed at the 1934 British Empire Games and 1938 British Empire Games.

== Biography ==
At the 1934 Empire Games Woodhouse won the bronze medal in the pole vault event. He was also a member of the Australian relay team which finished fourth in the 4×110 yards competition.

Woodhouse finished second behind Dick Webster in the pole vault event at the 1936 AAA Championships.

Two years later he finished seventh in the pole vault contest at the 1938 Empire Games.
