= Ian Young (sprinter) =

British athlete

Personal information
- Nationality: British (Scottish)
- Born: 5 April 1911
- Died: 2003 (aged 91–92)

Sport
- Sport: Athletics
- Event: Sprints
- Club: Edinburgh Harriers
Medal record
Men's Athletics
Representing Scotland
British Empire Games
Bronze medal – third place	1934 London	100 yards
Bronze medal – third place	1934 London	4×110 yards

Ian Campbell Young (5 April 1911 – 2003) was a Scottish athlete who competed in the 1934 British Empire Games.

== Biography ==
Young finished third behind fellow Scot Robin Murdoch in the 220 yards event at the 1934 AAA Championships. Shortly afterwards, he represented Scotland at the 1934 British Empire Games, where he won the bronze medal in the 100 yards event. He was also a member of the Scottish relay team which won the bronze medal in the 4×110 yards competition. In the 220 yards contest he finished fifth.
