= Stanley Scarsbrook =

British athlete

Personal information
- Nationality: British (English)
- Born: 5 October 1908 England

Sport
- Sport: Athletics
- Event: steeplechase
- Club: Surrey AC
Medal record
Men's Athletics
Representing England
British Empire Games
Gold medal – first place	1934 London	2 mi steeplechase

Stanley Charles Scarsbrook (5 October 1908, date of death unknown) was an English track and field athlete who competed in the 1934 British Empire Games.

== Biography ==
Scarsbrook became the national steeplechase champion after winning the British AAA Championships title at the 1934 AAA Championships.

Shortly afterwards, he represented England at the 1934 British Empire Games, winning the gold medal in the 2 miles steeplechase event.
