= Alan Hunter (athlete) =

Scottish athlete (1913-2002)

Personal information
- Nationality: British (Scottish)
- Born: 16 November 1913 Edinburgh, Scotland
- Died: 25 April 2002 (aged 88) Perth, Western Australia

Sport
- Sport: Athletics
- Event: hurdles
- Club: L.A.C
Medal record
Men's Athletics
Representing Scotland
British Empire Games
Gold medal – first place	1934 London	440 yd hurdles
Bronze medal – third place	1934 London	4×440 yd relay

Frank Alan Ritchie Hunter (16 November 1913 – 25 April 2002) was a Scottish athlete who competed in the 1934 British Empire Games.

== Biography ==
Hunter was born in Edinburgh and educated at Fettes College but moved to work in London for the Commercial Union Assurance Company.

Hunter finished third behind Ralph Kilner Brown in the 440 yards hurdles event at the 1934 AAA Championships. Shortly afterwards, he represented Scotland at the 1934 British Empire Games, where he won the gold medal in the 440 yards hurdles event. He was also a member of the Scottish relay team which won the bronze medal in the 4×440 yards competition. In the 440 yards contest he finished sixth.

Hunter became the national 440 yards hurdles champion after winning the British AAA Championships title at the 1935 AAA Championships.

During World War II he joined the Indian Army, where he was based at the time. After the war he returned to London and worked in Korea being awarded an OBE for his outstanding service. He retired from the army in 1955, with the rank of lieutenant colonel. He was chairman of the Scottish British Insurance Association from 1966 to 1967 and president of the Insurance and Actuarial Society of Glasgow. He became president of the Old Fettesian Association in the 1970s.

After retiring in 1979 he moved to Essex and then emigrated to Australia in 1986.
