= Everard Davis =

English sprinter (1912–2005)

Personal information
- Nationality: British (English)
- Born: 2 January 1912 Worthing, England
- Died: 25 October 2005 (aged 93)

Sport
- Sport: Athletics
- Event: Sprints
- Club: Cambridge University AC; Guy's Hospital
Medal record
Men's Athletics
Representing England
British Empire Games
Gold medal – first place	1934 London	4×110 yd

Everard Inseal Davis (2 January 1912 – 25 October 2005) was an English sprint athlete who competed in the 1934 British Empire Games.

== Biography ==
Davis was born in Worthing and studied at Emmanuel College, Cambridge, where he was the president of the Cambridge University Athletic Club.

He represented England at the 1934 British Empire Games in London, where he competed in the 100 yards and relay events. He was a member of the relay team, including Walter Rangeley, which won the gold medal.

After Cambridge he joined Guy's Hospital.
