= Ronald Vernieux =

Indian sprinter

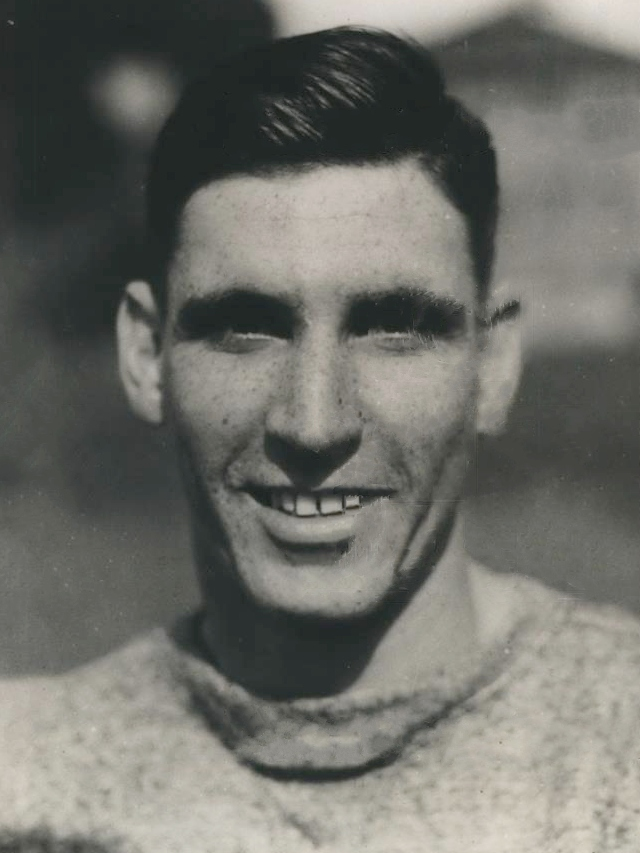
- Vernieux at the 1932 Olympics

Personal information
- Nationality: Indian
- Born: Ronald Alfred Vernieux; 18 October 1910 Calcutta, British India
- Died: 25 May 1997 (aged 86) Townsville, Australia

Sport
- Sport: Sprinting
- Event: 100 metres

Achievements and titles
- Personal bests: 100 yd – 9.7 (1934); 200 m – 22.5 (1932)

Ronald Alfred Vernieux (18 October 1910 – 25 May 1997) was an Indian sprinter. He competed in the 100 metres at the 1932 Summer Olympics. Vernieux finished sixth in the 1934 British Empire Games 4×110 yards relay (with Gyan Bhalla, Jahangir Khan and Niranjan Singh); in the 100 yards and 220 yards he was eliminated in the heats.
