= Denis Rathbone =

English sprinter

Personal information
- Nationality: British (English)
- Born: 30 May 1912 Liverpool, England
- Died: 1990 (aged 77–78) South Africa

Sport
- Sport: Athletics
- Event(s): 220y, 440y
- Club: Cambridge Univ AC; Achilles Club
Medal record
Men's Athletics
Representing England
British Empire Games
Gold medal – first place	1934 London	4×440 yards

Denis Lyle Rathbone (30 May 1912 – 1990) was an English track and field athlete who competed in the 1934 British Empire Games.

== Biography ==
Rathbone was born in Liverpool, England and was educated at Marlborough College and studied at Trinity College, Cambridge. Because he attended Cambridge he was a member of the Achilles Club.

He represented England at the 1934 British Empire Games in London, where he competed in the 220 yards and 4×440 yards relay, winning a gold medal with the relay team. In the 220 yards competition he was eliminated in the semi-finals.
