= Charles Bowen (athlete) =

British athlete (1908–1967)

Personal information
- Nationality: British (English)
- Born: 6 March 1908 Cairo, Egypt
- Died: 19 January 1967 (aged 58) Wirral, Cheshire, England

Sport
- Sport: Athletics
- Event: javelin
- Club: Lancashire Fusiliers

Charles Guy Bowen (6 March 1908 – 19 January 1967) was a military officer and an athlete who competed for England at the 1934 British Empire Games.

== Biography ==
Bowen, the son of Colonel Charles Eustace Bowen of Ramsgate, became the national javelin champion after winning the British AAA Championships title at the 1934 AAA Championships.

Shortly afterwards, he represented England at the 1934 British Empire Games in London, where he competed in the javelin. At the time of the Games, he was serving as a lieutenant with the Lancashire Fusiliers.

In 1937, he married Jane Mathews and was posted to Sierra Leone in West Africa, with the West African Frontier Force.
