= Birchall Pearson =

Canadian sprinter (1914–1960)

Bert Pearson
- Born: Birchall Lewis Pearson; April 3, 1914; Hamilton, Ontario, Canada
- Died: September 13, 1960 (aged 46); Hamilton, Ontario, Canada
- Spouse: Margaret Shaw

Birchall Pearson
Medal record

Men's Athletics

British Empire Games
Silver medal – second place	1934 London	4×110 yards

Birchall Lewis "Bert" Pearson (April 3, 1914 – September 13, 1960) was a Canadian athlete who competed in the 1932 Summer Olympics. He was born in Hamilton, Ontario.

In 1932 he was a member of the Canadian relay team which finished fourth in the 4×100 metre event. In the 100 metre competition as well as in the 200 metre contest he was eliminated in the semi-finals. At the 1934 Empire Games he won the silver medal with the Canadian team in the 4×110 yards relay event. In the 220 yards competition he was eliminated in the semi-finals and in the 100 yards contest he was eliminated in the heats.
