= Crew Stoneley =

English sprinter (1911–2002)

Personal information
- Nationality: British (English)
- Born: 9 May 1911 Leeds, England
- Died: 27 August 2002 (aged 91) Dorset, England
- Height: 163 cm (5 ft 4 in)
- Weight: 51 kg (112 lb)

Sport
- Sport: Athletics
- Event: 400 m/440 y
- Club: Army/Milocarian AC
Medal record
Men's athletics
Representing Great Britain
Olympic Games
Silver medal – second place	1932 Los Angeles	4 × 400 metre
Representing England
British Empire Games
Gold medal – first place	1934 London	4 × 440 yards
Bronze medal – third place	1934 London	440 yards

Crew Hadlett Stoneley OBE (9 May 1911 – 27 August 2002) was an English athlete who competed for Great Britain in the 1932 Summer Olympics.*

== Biography ==
Stoneley was born in Leeds, educated at Blundell's School and in 1931 received his commission in the British Army.

Stoneley became the national 440 yards champion after winning the British AAA Championships title at the 1932 AAA Championships.

Shortly afterwards he was selected to represent Great Britain at the 1932 Olympic Games in Los Angeles, as the leadoff runner in the 4 × 400 metre relay, where he won the silver medal with his teammates Tommy Hampson, David Burghley and Godfrey Rampling. In the 400 metre contest he was eliminated in the semi-finals.

At the 1934 British Empire Games he was a member of the English relay team which won the gold medal in the 4 × 440 yards competition. In the 440 yards event he won the bronze medal.

Stoneley was awarded the OBE. Stoneley retired in 1964 as a Brigadier and served as Colonel Commandant of the Royal Signals. He died in Dorset.
