= Arthur Sweeney =

British athlete (1909–1940)

Personal information
- Born: 20 May 1909 Dublin, Ireland
- Died: 27 December 1940 (aged 31) Takoradi, Gold Coast (present-day Ghana)

Sport
- Sport: Athletics
- Event: 100/220 yards
- Club: Milocarian AC / Royal Air Force
Medal record
Men's athletics
Representing England
British Empire Games
Gold medal – first place	1934 London	100 yards
Gold medal – first place	1934 London	220 yards
Gold medal – first place	1934 London	4×110 yards
Representing Great Britain
European Championships
Bronze medal – third place	1938 Paris	4×100 m

Arthur Wellington Sweeney (20 May 1909 – 27 December 1940) was an English athlete who competed for Great Britain at the 1936 Summer Olympics.

== Biography ==
Born in Dublin, Ireland, Sweeney finished second behind József Sir in the AAA Championships 100 yards event and finished second behind Robin Murdoch in the 220 yards event at the 1934 AAA Championships. Because he was the highest placed British athlete in the 100 yards in 1934 he claimed the title of British champion.

Shortly afterwards, Sweeney represented England at the 1934 Empire Games, where he won the gold medal in the 100 yards contest and in the 220 yards event. He was also a member of the English relay team which won the gold medal in the 4×110 yards competition.

At the 1935 AAA Championships, Sweeney won the 100 yards AAA Championships title and became the national 220 yards champion by virtue of finishing second behind Tinus Osendarp. One year later he retained both the 100 and 220 yards titles at the 1936 AAA Championships, although he once again had to settle for second place in the 100 yards behind Osendarp.

One month later he was selected to represent Great Britain at the 1936 Olympic Games held in Berlin, where he was eliminated in the semi-finals of the 100 metres event and in the first round of the 200 metres competition.

Further AAA titles came at both the 1937 AAA Championships and 1939 AAA Championships.

Sweeney was killed in a flying accident in Takoradi, Gold Coast, while serving as a wing commander in the Royal Air Force during the Second World War in 1940 aged 31. He was buried at the Takoradi European Public Cemetery.
