= Bill Christie =

Australian rugby league footballer (1908–1977)

Personal information
- Full name: William Ramsay Christie
- Born: 10 January 1908 Mackay, Queensland, Australia
- Died: 10 January 1977 (aged 69)

Playing information
- Position: Lock
Representative
Years	Team	Pld	T	G	FG	P
1931–32	Queensland	7	0	0	0	0
1932	Australia	1	0	0	0	0

William Ramsay Christie (10 January 1908 – 10 January 1977) was an Australian rugby league footballer.

Christie was a Queensland representative forward in 1931 and 1932. Primarily a lock, Christie gained international representative honours during the Kangaroos' home series against the 1932 Great Britain Lions, which he began as a reserve forward. He was close to playing the second Test match (known as the "Battle of Brisbane") when Wally Prigg was a late withdrawal, but was asleep at the team hotel when the call up came. For the final fixture of the series at the SCG, Christie played lock forward for Australia in what would remain his only cap.

Leaving Queensland in 1934, Christie spent the remainder of his career in Lismore and appeared in representative matches for NSW Country. He took over as coach of South Lismore in 1948.
