= Athletics at the 1934 British Empire Games =

Athletics at the 2nd British Empire and Commonwealth Games
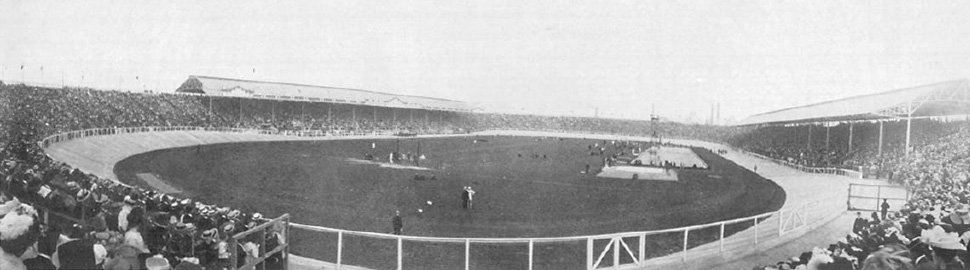
- The host stadium which also hosted events for the 1908 London Olympics.
- Dates: 4–7 August 1934
- Host city: London, England
- Venue: White City Stadium
- Level: Senior
- Events: 30
- Participation: 223 athletes from 15 nations

At the 1934 British Empire Games, the athletics events were held at the White City Stadium in London, England in August 1934. A total of 30 athletics events were contested at the Games, 21 by men and 9 by women.

== Medal summary ==
=== Men ===
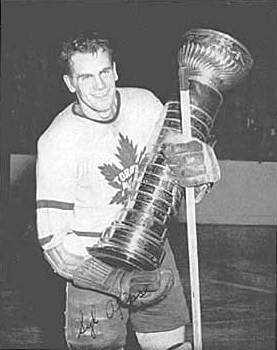
Future NHL legend Syl Apps won the pole vault.

Medallists in men's athletics by event, including times, heights and distances
Event	Gold		Silver		Bronze	
100 yards	Arthur Sweeney (ENG)	10.0	Marthinus Theunissen (SAF)	10.1e	Ian Young (SCO)	10.1e
220 yards	Arthur Sweeney (ENG)	21.9	Marthinus Theunissen (SAF)	22.0e	Walter Rangeley (ENG)	22.1e
440 yards	Godfrey Rampling (ENG)	48.0	Bill Roberts (ENG)	48.5e	Crew Stoneley (ENG)	48.6e
880 yards	Phil Edwards (BGU)	1:54.2	Willie Botha (SAF)	1:55.5e	Hamish Stothard (SCO)	1:55.6e
1 mile	Jack Lovelock (NZL)	4:12.8	Sydney Wooderson (ENG)	4:13.4e	Jerry Cornes (ENG)	4:16.6e
3 miles	Wally Beavers (ENG)	14:32.6	Cyril Allen (ENG)	14:37.8	Alec Burns (ENG)	14:45.4
6 miles	Arthur Penny (ENG)	31:00.6	Scotty Rankine (CAN)	31:02.4e	Arthur Furze (ENG)	31:03.6e
Marathon	Harold Webster (CAN)	2:40:36	Donald Robertson (SCO)	2:45:08	Dunky Wright (SCO)	2:56:20
2 miles steeplechase	Stanley Scarsbrook (ENG)	10:23.4	Tom Evenson (ENG)	10:25.8e	George Bailey (ENG)	+100 yd
120 yards hurdles	Donald Finlay (ENG)	15.2	James Worrall (CAN)	15.5e	Ashleigh Pilbrow (ENG)	15.7e
440 yards hurdles	Alan Hunter (SCO)	55.2	Charles Reilly (AUS)	55.8e	Ralph Brown (ENG)	56.0e
4 × 110 yards relay	England; Everard Davis; George Saunders; Walter Rangeley; Arthur Sweeney	42.2	Canada; Birchall Pearson; Frank Nicks; Allan Poole; Bill Christie	42.5e	Scotland; Archie Turner; David Brownlee; Robin Murdoch; Ian Young	43.0e
4 × 440 yards relay	England; Denis Rathbone; Geoffrey Blake; Crew Stoneley; Godfrey Rampling	3:16.8	Canada; William Fritz; John Addison; Art Scott; Ray Lewis	3:17.2e	Scotland; Richard Wallace; Ronald Wylde; Hamish Stothard; Alan Hunter	+120 yd
High jump	Edwin Thacker (SAF)	1.90	Joe Haley (CAN)	1.90	John Michie (SCO)	1.90
Pole vault	Syl Apps (CAN)	3.88	Alf Gilbert (CAN)	3.81	Fred Woodhouse (AUS)	3.66
Long jump	Sam Richardson (CAN)	7.17	Johann Luckhoff (SAF)	7.10	Jack Metcalfe (AUS)	6.93
Triple jump	Jack Metcalfe (AUS)	15.63	Sam Richardson (CAN)	14.65	Harold Brainsby (NZL)	14.62
Shot put	Harry Hart (SAF)	14.67	Robert Howland (ENG)	13.53	Kenneth Pridie (ENG)	13.43
Discus throw	Harry Hart (SAF)	41.53	Douglas Bell (ENG)	40.44	Bernard Prendergast (JAM)	40.23
Hammer throw	Malcolm Nokes (ENG)	48.25	George Sutherland (CAN)	46.24	William Mackenzie (SCO)	42.49
Javelin throw	Bob Dixon (CAN)	60.02	Harry Hart (SAF)	58.27	Johann Luckhoff (SAF)	56.49

=== Women ===
Medallists in women's athletics by event, including times, heights and distances
Event	Gold		Silver		Bronze	
100 yards	Eileen Hiscock (ENG)	11.3	Hilda Strike (CAN)	11.5e	Leonard Chalmers (ENG)	11.6e
220 yards	Eileen Hiscock (ENG)	25.0	Aileen Meagher (CAN)	25.4e	Nellie Halstead (ENG)	25.6e
880 yards	Gladys Lunn (ENG)	2:19.4	Ida Jones (ENG)	2:21.0e	Dorothy Butterfield (ENG)	2:21.4e
80 metres hurdles	Marjorie Clark (SAF)	11.8	Betty Taylor (CAN)	11.9e	Elsie Green (ENG)	12.2e
110–220–110 yards relay	England; Nellie Halstead; Eileen Hiscock; Elsie Maguire	49.4	Canada; Aileen Meagher; Audrey Dearnley; Hilda Strike	50.2e	Southern Rhodesia; Dorothy Ballantyne; Mollie Bragg; Cynthia Keay	52.0e
220–110–220–110 yards relay	Canada; Lillian Palmer; Betty White; Aileen Meagher; Audrey Dearnley	1:14.4	England; Eileen Hiscock; Ivy Walker; Nellie Halstead; Ethel Johnson	+1.5 yds (1:14.6 e)	Scotland; Margaret Mackenzie; Cathie Jackson; Sheena Dobbie; Joan Cunningham	+40 yds (1:19.1 e)
High jump	Marjorie Clark (SAF)	1.60	Eva Dawes (CAN)	1.57	Margaret Bell (CAN)	1.52
Long jump	Phyllis Bartholomew (ENG)	5.47	Evelyn Goshawk (CAN)	5.42	Violet Webb (ENG)	5.23
Javelin throw	Gladys Lunn (ENG)	32.19	Edith Halstead (*) (ENG)	30.94	Margaret Cox (ENG)	30.08

(*) Edith Halstead was later sexually reassigned and took the name Edwin "Eddie" Halstead, brother of Nellie Halstead.

== Medal table ==
* Host nation (England)

Medals won by nation with totals, ranked by number of golds—sortable
Rank	Nation	Gold	Silver	Bronze	Total
1	England (ENG)*	16	9	15	40
2	Canada (CAN)	5	14	1	20
3	South Africa (SAF)	5	5	1	11
4	Scotland (SCO)	1	1	8	10
5	Australia (AUS)	1	1	2	4
6	New Zealand (NZL)	1	0	1	2
7	British Guiana (BGU)	1	0	0	1
8	Jamaica (JAM)	0	0	1	1
8	Southern Rhodesia (SRH)	0	0	1	1
Totals (9 entries)		30	30	30	90

== Participating nations ==
- Australia (7)
- Bermuda (6)
- British Guiana (1)
- Canada (47)
- England (89)
- India (5)
- Jamaica (3)
- Newfoundland (3)
- New Zealand (3)
- Northern Ireland (6)
- Scotland (25)
- South Africa (11)
- Southern Rhodesia (6)
- Trinidad and Tobago (1)
- Wales (10)
