= Gyan Bhalla =

Indian sprinter (1910-?)

Personal information
- Full name: Gyan Prakash Bhalla
- Nationality: Indian
- Born: 22 April 1910

Sport
- Sport: Sprinting
- Event: 400 metres

Gyan Bhalla (born 22 April 1910, date of death unknown) was an Indian sprinter. He competed in the men's 400 metres at the 1936 Summer Olympics.
