= Robin Murdoch =

Scottish athlete

Personal information
- Nationality: British (Scottish)
- Born: 31 July 1911 Old Kilpatrick, West Dunbartonshire, Scotland
- Died: 13 September 1994 (aged 83)

Sport
- Sport: Athletics
- Event: Sprints
- Club: Glasgow University AC
Medal record
Men's Athletics
Representing Scotland
British Empire Games
Bronze medal – third place	1934 London	4×110 yards

Robin M. Murdoch (31 July 1911 – 13 September 1994) was a Scottish athlete who competed in the 1934 British Empire Games.

== Biography ==
Murdoch became the British 200 yards champion after winning the British AAA Championships title at the 1931 AAA Championships. Murdoch finished third behind Chris Berger in the 220 yards event at the 1933 AAA Championships.

At the 1934 Scottish AAA Championships he retained his 220 yards title and won the 100 yards title. Murdoch won his second British AAA Championships title at the 1934 AAA Championships and shortly afterwards, he represented Scotland at the 1934 British Empire Games, where he was a member of the relay team which won the bronze medal in the 4×110 yards event. In the 220 yards competition he finished fourth and in the 100 yards contest he finished fifth. He later chaired the Scottish Athletics Association.

Murdoch finished second behind Wil van Beveren in the 220 yards event at the 1938 AAA Championships.

Outside of athletics he was a Consultant obstetrician to Glasgow Royal Maternity Hospital and a consultant gynaecologist to the Royal Samaritan Hospital for Women and was the Senior Vice President of the Royal College of Obstetricians and Gynaecologists from 1974 to 1977.
