= Aquatics at the 1934 British Empire Games =

- Venue: Wembley Empire Pool
- Location: London, England
- Dates: 4 – 11 August 1934

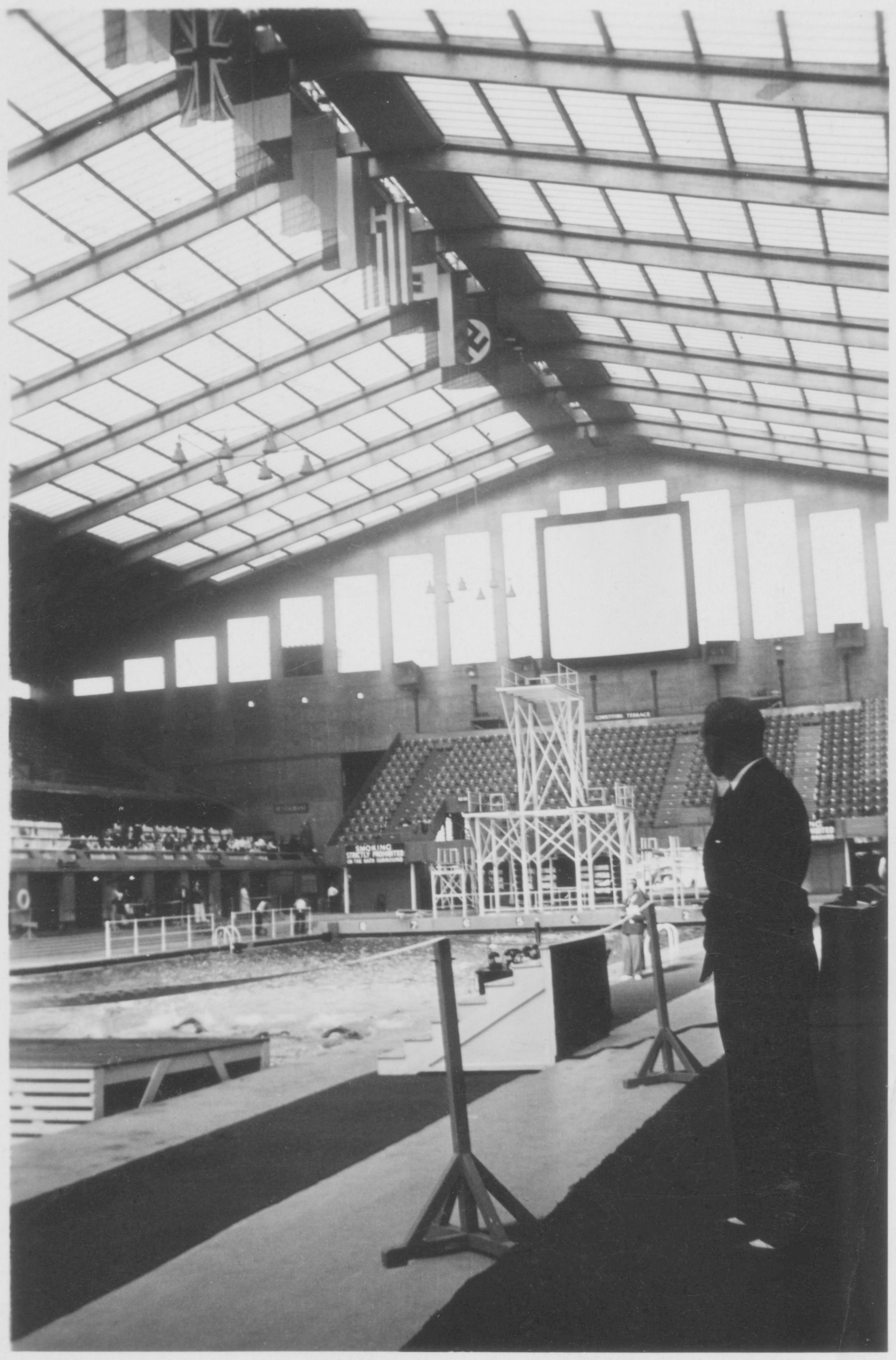
Wembley Empire Pool

At the 1934 British Empire Games in London, England, there were two aquatics disciplines – swimming and diving. There were four diving events contested and eleven swimming events.

The events were held at the Wembley Empire Pool, which was built specifically for the games on the instruction of Arthur Elvin.

== Medal table ==
* Host nation (England)

Medals won by nation with totals, ranked by number of golds—sortable
Rank	Nation	Gold	Silver	Bronze	Total
1	Canada (CAN)	8	4	6	18
2	England (ENG)*	4	6	6	16
3	Australia (AUS)	3	2	0	5
4	Scotland (SCO)	2	2	3	7
5	South Africa (SAF)	0	2	0	2
6	Jamaica (JAM)	0	1	0	1
7	New Zealand (NZL)	0	0	1	1
7	Wales (WAL)	0	0	1	1
Totals (8 entries)		17	17	17	51

== Medal summary ==
=== Diving ===
==== Men's events ====
Event	Gold		Silver		Bronze	
3 m springboard	John Brisco Ray (ENG)	117.12	Doug Tomalin (ENG)	110.50	Harry Class (CAN)	106.57
10 m platform	Tommy Mather (ENG)	83.83	Doug Tomalin (ENG)	83.63	Louis Marchant (ENG)	70.64

==== Women's events ====
Event	Gold		Silver		Bronze	
3 m springboard	Judith Moss (CAN)	62.27	Lesley Thompson (AUS)	60.49	Doris Ogilvie (CAN)	57.00
10 m platform	Dot Macready (ENG)	30.74	Lesley Thompson (AUS)	27.64	Cecily Cousens (ENG)	27.36

=== Swimming ===
==== Men's events ====
Event	Gold		Silver		Bronze	
100 yd freestyle	George Burleigh (CAN)	55.0	George Larson (CAN)	55.6	Noel Crump (NZL)	56.2
440 yd freestyle	Noel Ryan (AUS)	5:03.0	Norman Wainwright (ENG)	5:07.8	Bob Pirie (CAN)	5:14.8
1500 yd freestyle	Noel Ryan (AUS)	18:25.4	Bob Pirie (CAN)	18:28.4	Norman Wainwright (ENG)	18:33.2
100 yd backstroke	Willie Francis (SCO)	01:05.2	John Besford (ENG)	1:05.6	Ben Gazell (CAN)	1:06.6
200 yd breaststroke	Norman Hamilton (SCO)	2:41.4	William McCarty (JAM)	2:42.4	Bill Puddy (CAN)	2:42.8
4×200 yd freestyle relay	Canada; George Larson; George Burleigh; Robert Hooper; Bob Pirie	8:40.6	England; Mostyn Ffrench-Williams; Norman Wainwright; Reginald Sutton; Bob Leivers	8:52.8	Scotland; George Anderson; Harry Cunningham; Merrlees Chassels; Willie Burns	9:23.4
3×110 yd medley relay	Canada; Ben Gazell; George Burleigh; Albert Puddy	3:11.2	Scotland; Merrlees Chassels; Norman Hamilton; Willie Francis	3:15.2	England; Arthur Summers; John Besford; Mostyn Ffrench-Williams	3:16.0

==== Women's events ====
Event	Gold		Silver		Bronze	
100 yd freestyle	Phyllis Dewar (CAN)	1:03.0	Irene Pirie (CAN)	1:03.6	Jean McDowell (SCO)	1:05.8
440 yd freestyle	Phyllis Dewar (CAN)	5:45.6	(South Africa) Jenny Maakal (SAF)	5:53.0	Irene Pirie (CAN)	5:54.4
100 yd backstroke	Phyllis Harding (ENG)	1:13.8	Margot Hamilton (SCO)	1:15.0	(Wales) Valerie Davies (WAL)	1:18.2
200 yd breaststroke	Clare Dennis (AUS)	2:50.2	Phyllis Haslam (CAN)	2:55.4	Margery Hinton (ENG)	2:58.6
4×100 yd freestyle relay	Canada; Phyllis Dewar; Florence Humble; Margaret Hutton; Irene Pirie	4:21.8	South Africa; Jenny Maakal; Enid Hayward; Kathleen Russell; Molly Ryde	4:34.0	England; Edna Hughes; Beatrice Wolstenholme; Olive Bartle; Margery Hinton	4:34.4
3×110 yd medley relay	Canada; Margaret Hutton; Phyllis Haslam; Phyllis Dewar	3:42.0	England; Phyllis Harding; Vera Kingston; Edna Hughes	3:43.0	Scotland; Jean McDowell; Margot Hamilton; Madge McCallum	3:50.0

== Finals ==
=== Men (swimming) ===
==== 100 yd freestyle ====
- 1 (Canada) George Burleigh :55.0
- 2 (Canada) George Larson :55.6
- 3 (New Zealand) Noel Crump :56.2
- 4 (England) Reginald Sutton :57.8
- 5 (England) Frederick Dove :57.8
- 6 (England) Mostyn Ffrench-Williams :58.0

==== 440 yd freestyle ====
- 1 (Australia) Noel Ryan :5:03.0
- 2 (England) Norman Wainwright :5:07.8
- 3 (Canada) Bob Pirie :5:14.8
- 4 (Canada) George Larson :5:20.8
- 5 (Southern Rhodesia) Peter Foster :5:32.8
- 6 (England) Bob Leivers :5:35.4

==== 1500 yd freestyle ====
- 1 (Australia) Noel Ryan :18:25.2
- 2 (Canada) Bob Pirie :18:28.4
- 3 (England) Norman Wainwright :18:33.2
- 4 (Southern Rhodesia) Peter Foster :19:57:2
- 5 (Canada) Robert Hooper :19:58:6
- 6 (Canada) George Larson :dns

==== 100 yd backstroke ====
- 1 (Scotland) Willie Francis :01:05.2
- 2 (England) John Besford :1:05.6
- 3 (Canada) Ben Gazell :1:06.6
- 4 (South Africa) G. May :01:07.4
- 5 (England) Kenneth Scott :1:07.6
- 6 (Scotland) Willie Burns :1:09.6

==== 200 yd breaststroke ====
- 1 (Scotland) Norman Hamilton :2:41.4
- 2 (Jamaica) William McCarty :2:42.4
- 3 (Canada) Bill Puddy :2:42.8
- 4 (Australia) Alan Edward Higginson :2:44.8
- 5 (England) Goldup Davies :2:46.4
- 6 (Canada) A Gourlay :2:47.0

==== 4×200 yd freestyle relay ====
- 1 Canada :8:40.6 (Larson, Burleigh,Hooper, Pirie)
- 2 England :8:52.8 (Ffrench-Williams, Wainwright, Sutton, Leivers)
- 3 Scotland :9:23.4 (Anderson, Cunningham, Chassels, Burns)
- 4 Wales :10:16.2 (Capon, Davies, Evans, Street)

==== 3×110 yd medley relay ====
- 1 Canada :3:11.2 (Gazell, Burleigh, Puddy)
- 2 Scotland :3:15.2 (Chassels, Hamilton, Francis)
- 3 England :3:16.0 (Summers, Besford, Ffrench-Williams)
- 4 Australia :3.16.8 (Clark, Higginson, Ryan)
- 5 New Zealand :3.18.8 (Crump, Smith, Whareaitu)

=== Women (swimming) ===
==== 100 yd freestyle ====
- 1 (Canada) Phyllis Dewar :1:03.0
- 2 (Canada) Irene Pirie :1:03.6
- 3 (Scotland) Jean McDowell :1:05.8
- 4 (South Africa) Enid Hayward :1:06.4
- 5 (England) Edna Hughes :1:06.6
- 6 (South Africa) Jenny Maakal :1:06.8

==== 440 yd freestyle ====
- 1 (Canada) Phyllis Dewar :5:45.6
- 2 (South Africa) Jenny Maakal :5:53.0
- 3 (Canada) Irene Pirie :5:54.4
- 4 (England) Beatrice Wolstenholme :5.56.2
- 5 (England) Margery Hinton :6.00.0
- 6 (England) Gladys Morcom :6.16.0

==== 100 yd backstroke ====
- 1 (England) Phyllis Harding :1:13.8
- 2 (Scotland) Margot Hamilton :1:15.0
- 3 (Wales) Valerie Davies :1:18.2
- 4 (England) Audrey Hancock :1:20.6
- 5 (Canada) M Moffatt :1:21.8
- 6 (South Africa) Molly Ryde :1:22.0

==== 200 yd breaststroke ====
- 1 (Australia) Clare Dennis :2:51.2
- 2 (Canada) Phyllis Haslam :2:55.4
- 3 (England) Margery Hinton :2:58.6
- 4 (England) Margaret Gomm :3:01.4
- 5 (England) Vera Kingston :3:06.2
- 6 (South Africa) Jenny Maakal :dns

==== 4×100 yd freestyle relay ====
- 1 Canada :4:21.4-5 (Dewar, Humble, Hutton, Pirie)
- 2 South Africa :4:34 (Maakal, Hayward, Russell, Ryde)
- 3 England :4:34.2-5 (Hughes, Wolstenholme, Bartle, Hinton)
- 4 Scotland :4.44.1-5 (McCallam, Hamilton, Parker, McDowell)
- 5 Wales :4. (Greenland, Evans, Gould, Davies)

==== 3×110 yd medley relay ====
- 1 Canada :3:42.0 (Hutton, Haslam, Dewar)
- 2 England :3:43.0 (Harding, Kingston, Hughes)
- 3 Scotland :3:50.0 (McDowell, Hamilton, McCallum)
- 4 South Africa :

=== Men (diving) ===
==== 3 m springboard ====
- 1 (England) John Brisco Ray :117.12 Pts
- 2 (England) Doug Tomalin :110.50
- 3 (Canada) Harry Class :106.57
- 4 (England) Peter Beveridge :95.49

==== 10 m platform ====
- 1 (England) Tommy Mather :83.83 Pts
- 2 (England) Doug Tomalin :83.63
- 3 (England) Louis Marchant :70.64
- 4 (Wales) Arthur Perrow :46.25

=== Women (diving) ===
==== 3 m springboard ====
- 1 (Canada) Judith Moss :62.27 Pts
- 2 (Australia) Lesley Thompson :60.49
- 3 (Canada) Doris Ogilvie :57.00
- 4 (England) Katinka Larsen :54.10
- 5 (South Africa) Oonagh Whitsett :52.20
- 6 (Canada) M Stoneberg :46.43

==== 10 m platform ====
- 1 (England) Dot Macready :30.74 Pts
- 2 (Australia) Lesley Thompson :27.64
- 3 (England) Cecily Cousens :27.36
- 4 (Canada) Lynda Adams :27.20
- 5 (Canada) M Stoneberg :26.90
- 6 (Jamaica) N Morales :24.63
