= Athletics at the 1934 British Empire Games – Men's 1 mile =

Men's 1 mile at the 1934 British Empire Games
- Venue: White City Stadium
- Start date: 6 August 1934
- End date: 7 August 1934
- Winning time: 4:12.8

Medalists
gold medal	Jack Lovelock	New Zealand
silver medal	Sydney Wooderson	England
bronze medal	Jerry Cornes	England

The men's 1 mile event at the 1934 British Empire Games was held on 6 and 7 August at the White City Stadium in London, England.

== Medalists ==
Gold	Silver	Bronze
Jack Lovelock; New Zealand	Sydney Wooderson; England	Jerry Cornes; England

== Results ==
=== Heats ===
Qualification: First 4 in each heat (Q) qualify directly for the final.

Rank	Heat	Name	Nationality	Time	Notes
1	1	Ken Harris	Wales	4:35.4	Q
2	1	Horace Craske	England	?:??.?	Q
3	1	Jerry Cornes	England	?:??.?	Q
4	1	Robert Graham	Scotland	?:??.?	Q
	1	Wilton Lander	Australia	DNS	
	1	Earl Moore	Canada	DNS	
	1	Phil Edwards	British Guiana	DNS	
1	2	Aubrey Reeve	England	4:24.0	Q
2	2	Sydney Wooderson	England	?:??.?	Q, +5 yd
3	2	Jack Lovelock	New Zealand	?:??.?	Q, +3 yd
4	2	Les Wade	Canada	?:??.?	Q
?	2	John Laidlaw	Scotland	?:??.?	
?	2	Harold Thompson	South Africa	?:??.?	
?	2	Mannie Dookie	Trinidad and Tobago	?:??.?	

=== Final ===
Rank	Name	Nationality	Time	Notes
1st place, gold medalist(s)	Jack Lovelock	New Zealand	4:12.8	GR
2nd place, silver medalist(s)	Sydney Wooderson	England	4:13.4e	+5 yd
3rd place, bronze medalist(s)	Jerry Cornes	England	4:16.6e	+1 yd
4	Aubrey Reeve	England	?:??.?	
5	Robert Graham	Scotland	?:??.?	
6	Les Wade	Canada	?:??.?	
7	Ken Harris	Wales	?:??.?	
8	Horace Craske	England	?:??.?	
