= Athletics at the 1934 British Empire Games – Men's shot put =

Men's shot put at the Commonwealth Games

The men's shot put event at the 1934 British Empire Games was held on 6 August at the White City Stadium in London, England.

== Results ==
Rank	Name	Nationality	Result	Notes
1st place, gold medalist(s)	Harry Hart	South Africa	48 ft 1 3/4 in (14.67 m)	
2nd place, silver medalist(s)	Robert Howland	England	44 ft 4 3/4 in (13.53 m)	
3rd place, bronze medalist(s)	Kenneth Pridie	England	44 ft 0 3/4 in (13.43 m)	
4	George Walla	Canada	43 ft 4 3/4 in (13.23 m)	
5	Herbert Reeves	England	41 ft 10 1/4 in (12.76 m)	
6	Anthony Watson	England	39 ft 11 1/2 in (12.18 m)	
7	Arthur Lewis	Wales	38 ft 4 3/4 in (11.70 m)	
8	George Sutherland	Canada	?	
	A. Spurling	Bermuda	DNS	
	Robert Waters	Canada	DNS	
