= Athletics at the 1934 British Empire Games – Men's 3 miles =

Men's 3 miles at the 1934 British Empire Games
- Venue: White City Stadium
- Date: 5 August 1934
- Winning time: 14:32.6

Medalists
| gold medal | Wally Beavers | England |
| silver medal | Cyril Allen | England |
| bronze medal | Alec Burns | England |

The men's 3 miles event at the 1934 British Empire Games was held on 5 August at the White City Stadium in London, England.

== Results ==
| Rank | Name | Nationality | Time | Notes |
|---|---|---|---|---|
| 1st place, gold medalist(s) | Wally Beavers | England | 14:32.6 | |
| 2nd place, silver medalist(s) | Cyril Allen | England | 14:37.8 | +30 yd |
| 3rd place, bronze medalist(s) | Alec Burns | England | 14:45.4 | +40 yd |
| 4 | Scotty Rankine | Canada | ??:??.? | |
| 5 | Jack Parker | Northern Ireland | ??:??.? | |
| 6 | Harold Thompson | South Africa | ??:??.? | |
| 7 | John Laidlaw | Scotland | ??:??.? | |
| 8 | Lloyd Longman | Canada | ??:??.? | |
| 9 | James Caie | Scotland | ??:??.? | |
| 10 | Len Tongue | Wales | ??:??.? | |
| | Mannie Dookie | Trinidad and Tobago | DNF | |
| | Roy Oliver | Canada | DNS | |
| | Jack Holden | England | DNS | |
| | John Lovelock | New Zealand | DNS | |
