= Kenneth Street =

Ken or Kenneth Street may refer to:

- Ken Street (1911–1942), Welsh swimmer
- Kenneth Street (jurist) (1890–1972), Australian jurist
- Kenneth Street Jr. (1920–2006), American chemist
