= Hamilton Milton =

British swimmer

Personal information
- Full name: Hamilton Pirie Matt Milton
- Born: 22 March 1938 London, England
- Died: 24 April 2025 (aged 87) Totnes, Devon
- Height: 1.88 m (6 ft 2 in)
- Weight: 82 kg (181 lb)

Sport
- Sport: Swimming

Hamilton Pirie Matt Milton (22 March 1938 – 24 May 2025) a retired British swimmer. His team finished fourth in the 4×200 m freestyle relay at the 1960 Summer Olympics setting a new European record.

Milton was educated at Bedford Modern School. Three of his relatives competed at the 1936 Summer Olympics: his uncle Bob Pirie and mother Irene Pirie-Milton were Canadian swimmers, and his father Frederick Milton was a British water polo player.
