= Allan Brodie =

Allan Brodie may refer to:

- Allan G. Brodie (1897–1976), American dentist and orthodontist
- Allan Marshall Brodie, British historian
- Allan Brodie (wrestler) (1912–1996), Scottish wrestler
