= Guy Robertson =

Scottish swimmer

Sport
- Sport: Swimming
- Strokes: freestyle
- Club: Pollockshields Baths, Glasgow

Guy Robertson was a Scottish competitive swimmer who specialised in freestyle and represented Scotland at the 1934 British Empire Games (now Commonwealth Games).

== Biography ==
Robertson was a policeman with the Glasgow Police and was a member of the Pollockshields Baths Club.

Following the Empire Games swimming trials at Port Seton, Robertson was named in the Scottish Empire Games team.

He subsequently swam for Scotland at the British Empire Games in London, participating in the 440 yards freestyle event.
