= Scotland at the 1934 British Empire Games =

- CGF code: SCO
- CGA: Scotland at the Commonwealth Games
- Website: www.teamscotland.scot

in London, England
- Medals Ranked 5th: Gold 5 Silver 4 Bronze 17 Total 26

British Empire Games appearances
- 1930; 1934; 1938; 1950; 1954; 1958; 1962; 1966; 1970; 1974; 1978; 1982; 1986; 1990; 1994; 1998; 2002; 2006; 2010; 2014; 2018; 2022; 2026; 2030

Scotland at the 1934 British Empire Games (abbreviated SCO) was the second appearance of the country at the British Empire Games.

Scotland came 5th overall in the games, with 5 gold medals, 4 silver medals and 17 bronze medals.

== Team ==
=== Athletics ===
Men

Athlete	Events	Club	Medal/ref
David Brownlee	100y, 220y, 4x110y relay	Sprinburn Harriers	Bronze medal
James Caie	3 miles	South London Harriers	
Bobby Graham	880y, 1 mile	Maryhill Harriers	
William Gunn	steeplechase	Plebeian Harriers	
Alan Hunter	440y, 4x440y relay, 440yH	London AC	Gold medal Bronze medal
John Laidlaw	1 mile, 3 miles	Edinburgh Northern Harriers	
William Mackenzie	Hammer throw	Field Events Club, Edinburgh	Bronze medal
John Michie	High jump	West of Scotland Harriers	Bronze medal
Robin Murdoch	100y, 220y, 4x110y relay	Glasgow University AC	Bronze medal
Patrick Ogilvie	Pole vault	Achilles Club	
Donald Robertson	marathon	Maryhill Harriers	Silver medal
Robert Robertson	Long jump	Glasgow University AC	
Hamish Stothard	880y, 4x440y relay	Cambridge University AC	/
Archie Turner	100y, 220y, 4x110y relay	Maryhill Harriers	Bronze medal
Richard Wallace	440y, 4x440y relay	Stewart's FP	Bronze medal
Dunky Wright	marathon	Maryhill Harriers	Bronze medal
Ronald Wylde	440y, 4x440y relay	Edinburgh University AC	Bronze medal
Ian Young	100y, 220y, 4x110y relay	Edinburgh Harriers	/

Women

Athlete	Events	Club	Medal/ref
Barbara Barnetson	100y, 220y, 440y relay	Edinburgh University AC	
Joan Cunningham	100y, 660y relay	Edinburgh University AC	Bronze medal
Sheena Dobbie	220y, 660y, 440y & 660y relays	Glasgow University AC	Bronze medal
Cathie Jackson	100y, 220y, 440y & 660y relays	Shettleston Harriers	Bronze medal
Margaret Mackenzie	100y, 220y, 660y relay	Aberdeen University AC	Bronze medal
Mildred Storrar	880y	Dundee Hawhill Harriers	

=== Boxing ===
Athlete	Events	Club	Medal/ref
David Douglas-Hamilton	Heavyweight 91kg	Oxford University	Bronze medal
George Holton	Light heavyweight 81kg	Douglas & Clydesdale ABC	Silver medal
Angus McGregor	Featherweight 57kg	Greenock Central ABC	
Jacky MacLeod	Welterweight 67kg	Leith Victoria AAC	
James McKillop	Middleweight 75kg	Motherwell BC	
James Reilly	Flyweight 51kg	Southern AAC, Glasgow	
Jim Rolland	Lightweight 60kg	Nottingham Police	
Tommy Wells	Bantamweight 54kg	Leith Victoria A.A.C.	Bronze medal

=== Cycling ===
Athlete	Events	Club	Medal/ref
Willie Tagg	time trial, scratch, sprint	Glasgow Wheelers	

=== Lawn bowls ===
Athlete	Events	Club	Medal/ref
James Brown	fours/rinks	Kirkhill BC, Cambuslang	Bronze medal
William Lowe	fours/rinks	Musselburgh BC	Bronze medal
James Morrison	fours/rinks	Strathaven BC	Bronze medal
Alex Niven	pairs	Abbotsford BC, Galashiels	
George Niven	pairs	Abbotsford BC, Galashiels	
Robert Sprot	singles	Wishaw BC	Gold medal
Charles Tait	fours/rinks	Dudhope BC, Dundee	Bronze medal

=== Swimming ===
Men

Athlete	Events	Club	Medal/ref
George Anderson	freestyle relay	Pollockshields Baths, Glasgow	Bronze medal
Willie Burns	100y backstroke, freestyle relay	Glasgow Police	Bronze medal
Merrlees Chassels	freestyle relay, medley relay	Pollockshields Baths, Glasgow	/
Harry Cunningham	freestyle relay	Motherwell YMI ASC	Bronze medal
Willie Francis	100 yd backstroke, medley relay	Renfrew Baths	/
Norman Hamilton	200y breaststroke, medley relay	Western Baths, Glasgow	/
Guy Robertson	440y freestyle	Pollockshields Baths, Glasgow	

Women

Athlete	Events	Club	Medal/ref
Margot Hamilton	100y backstroke, 2 x relays	Western Baths, Glasgow	/
Jean McDowell	100y freestyle, 2 x relays	Warrender Baths Club, Edinburgh	/
Madge McCallum	2 x relays	Renfrew Baths	Bronze medal
Elspeth Parker	freestyle relay	Western Baths, Glasgow	
Doris Steel	440y freestyle	Western Baths, Glasgow	

=== Wrestling ===
Athlete	Events	Club	Medal/ref
Maurice Allwood	Welterweight	Edinburgh Transport	
Allan Brodie	Light heavyweight	London Police	
Archie Dudgeon	Heavyweight	Premier WC, Glasgow	Bronze medal
Robert Harcus	Middleweight	Holyrood, Edinburgh	Bronze medal
Edward Melrose	Bantamweight	Kilmarnock	Gold medal
Drummond Walker	Lightweight	Denny & Dunipace AAC	
Murdoch White	Featherweight	Edinburgh Transport	Bronze medal
