= Irene Evans (swimmer) =

British swimmer

Personal information
- Nationality: British (Welsh)
- Born: Wales

Sport
- Sport: Swimming
- Event(s): Freestyle, Backstroke
- Club: Swansea SC

Irene Evans was a Welsh swimmer who specialised in freestyle and backstroke and competed at the Commonwealth Games.

== Biography ==
Evans was born in Wales and was a member of the Swansea Swimming Club and was twice junior champion of Wales, in addition to being the senior champion of Wales over the freestyle in 1933. She was also a competent backstroke swimmer, finishing third behind Valerie Davies and Jeanne Greenland in the 1933 Welsh backstroke championship.

In June 1934, Evans was selected for preliminary trials for the 1934 British Empire Games team and subsequently represented the Welsh team at the 1934 British Empire Games in London, where she helped Wales finish fifth in the 4 × 100 yards freestyle relay with Peggy Gould, Valerie Davies and Jeanne Greenland.

After the Games had finished Evans was presented to the Prince of Wales at York House. In 1936 she became the backstroke champion of Wales.
