= Doris Steel =

Scottish swimmer

Sport
- Sport: Swimming
- Strokes: freestyle
- Club: Western Baths, Glasgow

Doris C. Steel was a Scottish competitive swimmer who specialised in freestyle and represented Scotland at the 1934 British Empire Games (now Commonwealth Games).

== Biography ==
Steel was educated at Laurel Bank School in Hillhead. She was a member of the Western Baths in Glasgow and at the Empire Games swimming trials at Port Seton, she won the 440 yards freestyle event.

She held the Scottish record for 440 yards freestyle and won the 1934 Scottish title.

Steel subsequently represented the Scottish Empire Games team at the 1934 British Empire Games in London, England, participating in the 440 yards freestyle event.
