= Frederick Milton =

British swimmer and water polo player

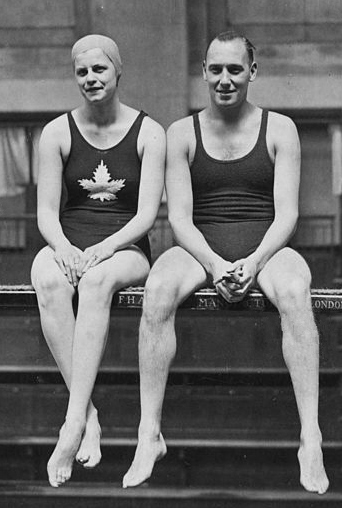
- Pirie and Milton in 1935

Personal information
- Full name: Frederick George Matt Milton
- Born: 21 October 1906 Marylebone, London
- Died: August 1991 (aged 84) Cirencester, England

Sport
- Sport: Swimming, water polo
- Event: Freestyle
Medal record
Representing England
British Empire Games
Silver medal – second place	1930 Hamilton	4×200 yd freestyle

Frederick George Matt Milton (21 October 1906 – August 1991) was an English water polo player and competitive swimmer who represented Great Britain at the Olympics and England at the British Empire Games during the 1930s.

== Biography ==
Milton was born in Marylebone, London.

Milton competed for the 1930 English team and won a silver medal in the 4×200 yards freestyle relay event at the 1930 British Empire Games in Hamilton, Ontario, Canada. In the 400-yard freestyle he finished fifth. At the Games he met Canadian swimmer Irene Pirie.

In 1935 Milton married Irene Pirie, both she and her brother Bob Pirie competed at the 1936 Olympics. Milton was a five times British champion.

Milton was part of the British water polo team that finished eighth at the 1936 Summer Olympics. He played four matches.

Milton married Irene Pirie; their son Hamilton Milton is a retired British Olympic swimmer.

== See also ==
- List of Commonwealth Games medallists in swimming (men)
