= Thomas Mather =

Thomas Mather may refer to:

- Tommy Mather, British Olympic diver
- Tom Mather, English football manager
- Thomas Mather (politician), American politician in Illinois
