= Athletics at the 1934 British Empire Games – Men's hammer throw =

Men's hammer throw at the Commonwealth Games

The men's hammer throw event at the 1934 British Empire Games was held on 7 August at the White City Stadium in London, England.

== Results ==
Rank	Name	Nationality	Result	Notes
1st place, gold medalist(s)	Malcolm Nokes	England	158 ft 3 1/2 in (48.25 m)	GR
2nd place, silver medalist(s)	George Sutherland	Canada	151 ft 8 1/2 in (46.24 m)	
3rd place, bronze medalist(s)	William Mackenzie	Scotland	139 ft 5 in (42.49 m)	
4	Robert Waters	Canada	130 ft 10 in (39.88 m)	
5	Douglas Bell	England	127 ft 3 in (38.79 m)	
6	Norman Drake	England	117 ft 5 in (35.79 m)	
	Herbert Reeves	England	?	
	W. Cofield	Newfoundland	?	
