= Norman Hamilton =

Norman Hamilton may refer to:

- Norman Hamilton (minister), moderator of the Presbyterian Church in Ireland
- Norman R. Hamilton, American businessman and politician, U.S. representative from Virginia
- Norman Hamilton (swimmer), Scottish swimmer
