= Peter Foster (sportsman) =

Rhodesian sportsman - Swimmer, Boxer, Rugby and Water polo Player

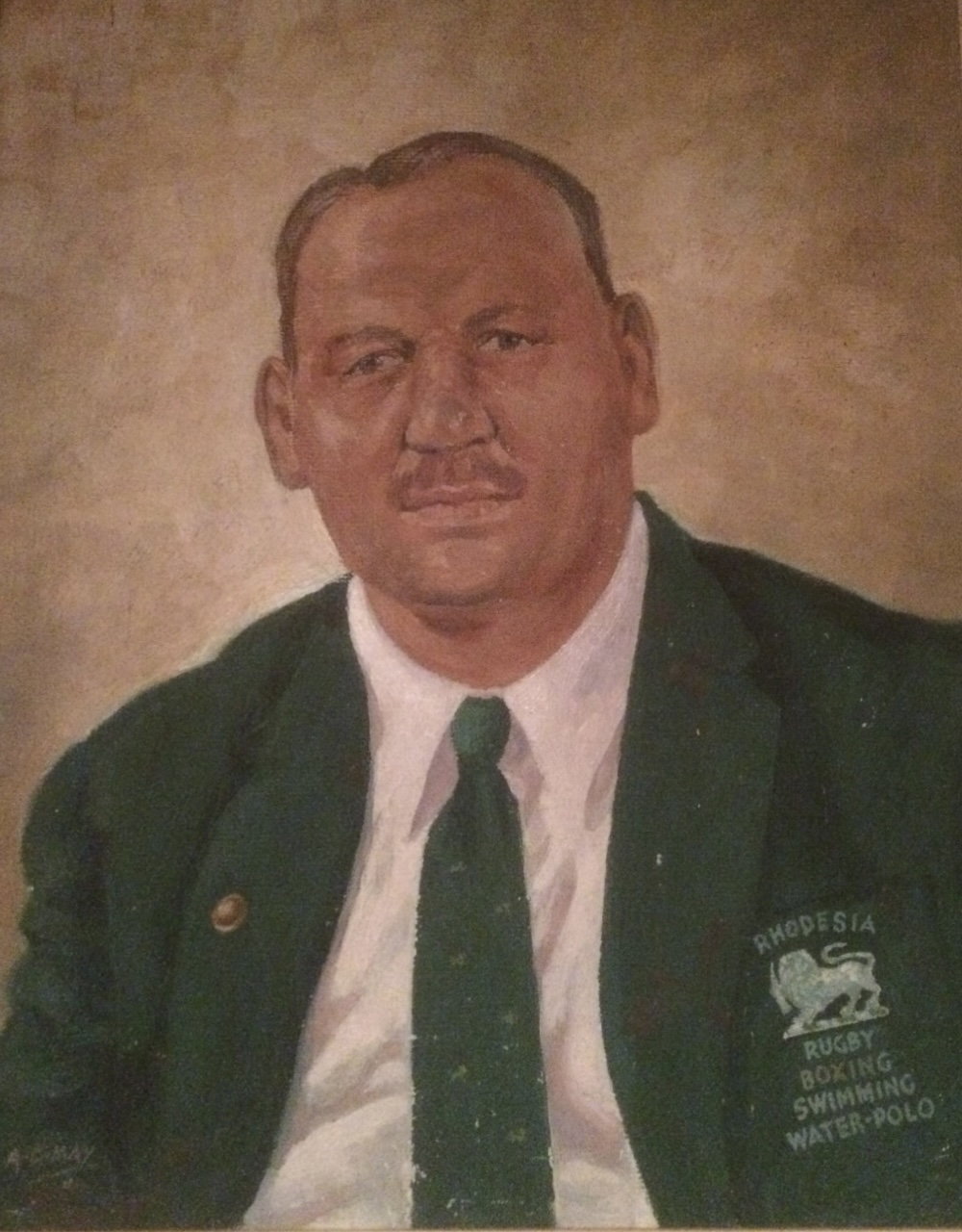

Personal information
- Nicknames: Peter Foster, CN Foster
- Born: 27 October 1916 Johannesburg, South Africa
- Died: 8 April 1976 (aged 59) Bulawayo, Rhodesia
- Family: Richard Foster (brother), Des Foster (nephew)

Sport
- Sport: Swimming
- Strokes: Freestyle
- Club: Old Miltonians
Medal record
Men's swimming
Representing Rhodesia
South African National Swimming Championships
Gold medal – first place	1934 Pretoria	500 yd freestyle
Gold medal – first place	1934 Pretoria	880 yd freestyle
Men's boxing
South African ABA National Championships
Gold medal – first place	1946	Heavyweight

Cedric Norman Macdonald Foster (27 October 1916 – 8 April 1976) was a Rhodesian sportsman who competed for both Rhodesia and South Africa. He was proficient in freestyle swimming, boxing, rugby union and water polo.

== Biography ==
Foster was born as a twin in Johannesburg, South Africa; he was schooled at Milton High School, Bulawayo in Bulawayo, Rhodesia. At the 1934 South Africa National Championship he won gold in the 500-yard with a time of 6m.31.2/5sec.

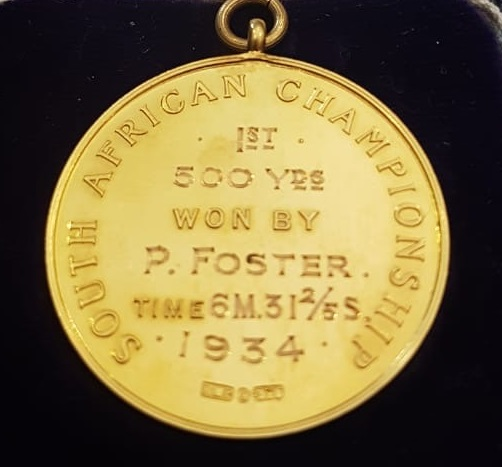
1934 gold medal

At the 1934 British Empire Games in London, England, he was a member of the Southern Rhodesia swimming team. He placed fifth in the 440 yards freestyle final and fourth in the 1500 yards freestyle final.

As a water polo player, Foster represented his club, his province and Rhodesia at a national level and as a boxer, Foster had full national colours for boxing and also competed in the South African Amateur national Boxing association championships in 1946, and won the heavyweight Trophy.

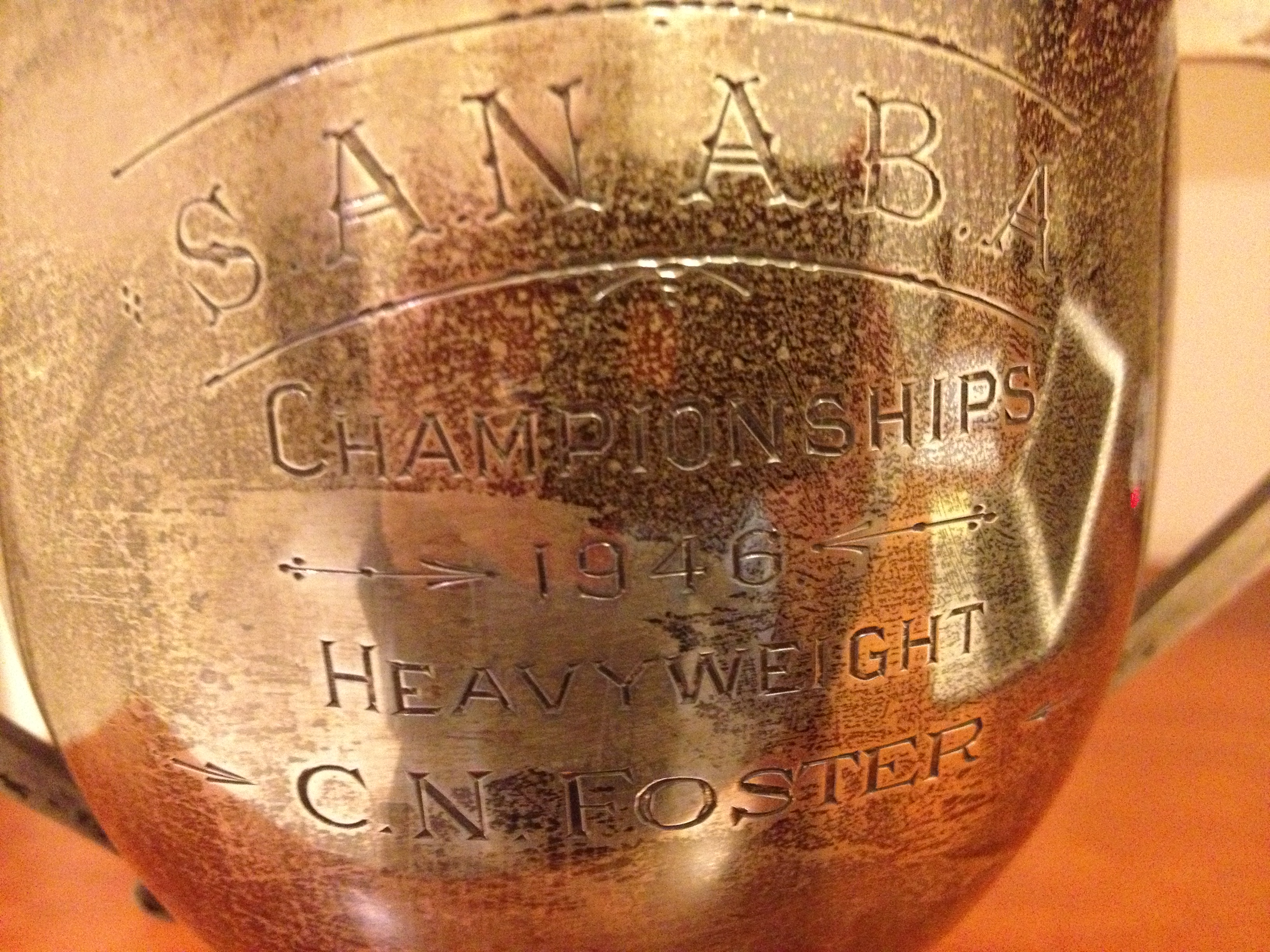
South African Boxing Championship - Heavyweight trophy 1946

In the 1930s, Foster was regarded as an all-round Rhodesian sporting great of his time.

Noted by his old sporting club in Bulawayo - Old Miltonian News.

"....Peter Foster who later smashed the South African records for 500 yards and 880 yards and came fourth in the 1 500 yards at the London Empire Games in 1934. Peter Foster is perhaps the finest Sportsman Rhodesia has ever produced. Besides the above swimming feats, he also represented Rhodesia in Water Polo (Captain), Boxing (South African Champion) and Rugby."

He died in Bulawayo in 1976, aged 60.

== See also ==
- Aquatics at the 1934 British Empire Games
