= Vera Kingston =

English swimmer (1917–1996)

Personal information
- Nationality: British (English)
- Born: 4 February 1917 Leicester, England
- Died: September 1996 (aged 79) Leicester, England

Sport
- Sport: Swimming
- Event: Breaststroke
- Club: United Ladies' SC, Leicester
Medal record
Women's swimming
Representing England
British Empire Games
Silver medal – second place	1934 London	3×110 yd medley

Vera Kingston (4 February 1917 – September 1996), later known by her married name Vera Robinson, was an English competition swimmer of the 1930s who represented Great Britain in the Olympics and swam for England in the British Empire Games.

== Biography ==
Kingston was born in Leicester, England and was a member of the United Ladies' Swimming Club of Leicester.

She represented England at the 1934 British Empire Games in London, where she competed in the 200 yards breaststroke and the 3×110 medley relay events, winning a silver medal.

At the 1936 Summer Olympics in Berlin, she was eliminated in the first round of the 200-metre breaststroke event.
