= Archie Dudgeon =

Scottish wrestler

Personal information
- Nationality: British (Scottish)
- Born: 1911 Glasgow, Scotland
- Died: 1959 (aged 47–48) Angus, Scotland

Sport
- Sport: Wrestling
- Event: Heavyweight
- Club: Premier Weightlifting and Wrestling Club
Medal record
Men's freestyle wrestling
Representing Scotland
British Empire Games
Bronze medal – third place	1934 London	Heavyweight

Archibald Forbes Dudgeon (1911 – 1959) was a wrestler who competed for Scotland at two British Empire Games (now Commonwealth Games) and won a bronze medal in 1934.

== Biography ==
Dudgeon was best known for representing Scotland at the 1934 British Empire Games, where he won the bronze medal in the heavyweight division of the wrestling competition at the 1934 British Empire Games in London, He finished third in his round robin pool matches to claim the bronze.

He competed in the heavyweight division and weighed 21 stone.

He also attended a second British Empire Games, when representing the 1938 Scottish team at the 1938 British Empire Games in Sydney, Australia. At the time of the 1938 Games he was a joiner and lived at 24 Craigton Road, Glasgow.

Dudgeon was a two-times winner of the British Wrestling Championships at heavyweight in 1936 and 1937.
