= Ronald Evans (swimmer) =

British swimmer

Personal information
- Nationality: British (Welsh)
- Born: Wales

Sport
- Sport: Swimming
- Event: Freestyle
- Club: Swansea SC; Brighton Shiverers

Ronald Evans was a Welsh swimmer who specialised in freestyle and competed at the Commonwealth Games.

== Biography ==
Evans was born in Wales and was a member of the Swansea Swimming Club. He was described as a clever exponent of the crawl and also competed in water polo and diving events.

In June 1934, Evans was selected for preliminary trials for the 1934 British Empire Games team He subsequently represented the Welsh team at the 1934 British Empire Games in London, where he competed in the 440 yards freestyle and helped Wales finish fourth in the 4 × 200 yards freestyle relay with Arthur Davies, Selwyn Capon and Ken Street.

After the Games had finished Evans was presented to the Prince of Wales at York House. In 1936, he left Swansea to take a work position in Brighton and joined the Brighton Shiverers.
