= Giacomo Signori =

Italian swimmer (1914–2005)

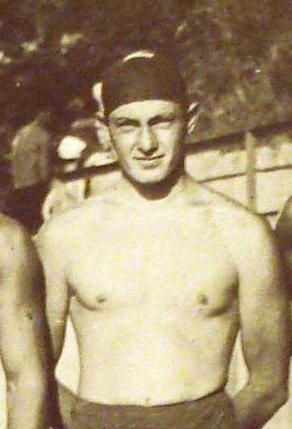

Personal information
- Born: 11 June 1914 Desenzano del Garda, Italy
- Died: 5 February 2005 (aged 90) Desenzano del Garda, Italy

Sport
- Sport: Swimming, water polo
Medal record
Representing Italy
Swimming
European Championships
Bronze medal – third place	1934 Magdeburg	400 m freestyle
Bronze medal – third place	1934 Magdeburg	4×200 m freestyle

Giacomo Signori (11 June 1914 – 5 February 2005) was an Italian swimmer and water polo player. He won two medals at the 1934 European Aquatics Championships, and at least seven national titles in freestyle swimming events.

As a water polo player, he won three national titles with the Rari Nantes Florentia (1934), Canottieri Olona (1947), and Rari Nantes Camogli (1953) teams. After retiring from competitions, he worked as a swimming coach.
