= Joseph Heath (athlete) =

British athlete (born c. 1915)

J. C. W. Heath
Personal information
- Nationality: British
- Born: c. 1915

Sport
- Sport: Athletics
- Event: Javelin/discus
- Club: Birchfield Harriers

J. C. W. Heath (c. 1915) was a British athlete who competed for England.

== Biography ==
Heath was a member of Birmingham's Birchfield Harriers club, and he was the 1932 AAA junior champion.

He represented England at the 1934 British Empire Games in London, where he competed in the javelin throw event.

In addition to being a javelin thrower, he competed in the discus throw and was the 1934 Midland Counties AAA Champion in the latter.

In 1935, he was announced as a candidate for the 1936 Summer Olympics.
