= John Brisco Ray =

English diver

Personal information
- Nationality: British (English)
- Born: 25 July 1902 Cowfold, England
- Died: 1973 (aged 71) Croydon, England

Sport
- Sport: Diving
- Event: Springboard
- Club: Highgate Diving Club
Medal record
Diving
Representing England
British Empire Games
Gold medal – first place	1934 London	3 Metres Springboard

John Brisco Ray was an English diver who competed for England.

== Diving career ==
Ray was born in Cowfold, England and was a member of the Highgate Diving Club.

He represented England at the 1934 British Empire Games in London, where he competed in the 3 metres springboard event, winning a gold medal.
