= Gladys Morcom =

British swimmer

Personal information
- Nationality: British (English)
- Born: 31 October 1918 Dudley, England
- Died: 18 January 2010 (aged 91) Penrhyn Bay, Wales

Sport
- Sport: Athletics
- Event: freestyle
- Club: Dudley Ladies SC

Gladys Elsie Morcom (31 October 1918 – 18 January 2010) was a British swimmer who competed at the 1936 Summer Olympics.

== Biography ==
Morcom was born in Dudley, England and swam for the Dudley Ladies Swimming Club. Aged 15, she began her international career and was the 1936 British 220 and 440 yards freestyle champion.

She represented England at the 1934 British Empire Games in London, where she competed in the 440 yards freestyle event.

At the 1936 Olympic Games in Berlin, she competed in the women's 400 metre freestyle.

She married Basil Lees in 1958 and became Gladys Lees and died in 2010.
