= Margaret Gomm =

British swimmer

Personal information
- Nationality: British (English)
- Born: 27 March 1921 Brentford, England
- Died: 26 February 1974 (aged 52) Hillingdon, England

Sport
- Sport: Swimming
- Event: Breaststroke
- Club: Hammersmith Ladies SC

Margaret Olive Gomm also known as Peggy Gomm (27 March 1921 – 26 February 1974) was a British swimmer who competed at the 1936 Summer Olympics.

== Biography ==
Gomm was born in Brentford, England and was a member of the Hammersmith Ladies Swimming Club.

She represented England at the 1934 British Empire Games in London, where she competed in the 200 yards breaststroke event.

At the 1936 Olympic Games in Berlin, she competed in the women's 200 metre breaststroke.
