= Reginald Sutton =

British swimmer

Reg Sutton
Personal information
- Nationality: British (English)
- Born: 10 May 1909 Hackney, London, England
- Died: 31 July 1994 (aged 85) Watsons Bay, New South Wales, Australia

Sport
- Sport: Swimming
- Event: Freestyle
- Club: Plaistow United SC
Medal record
Representing England
British Empire Games
Silver medal – second place	1934 London	4×200 yd freestyle

Reginald James Cushing Sutton (10 May 1909 – 31 July 1994) was an English freestyle swimmer and water polo player who competed for Great Britain in the 1928 Summer Olympics, in the 1932 Summer Olympics, and in the 1936 Summer Olympics.

== Biography ==
Sutton was born in London and was a member of the Plaistow United Swimming Club.

In 1928 he finished sixth with the British team in the 4×200 metre freestyle relay event. In the 100 metre freestyle competition he was eliminated in the first round.

Four years later he was a member of the British team which finished fifth with the British team in the 4×200 metre freestyle relay contest at the 1932 Games. He also swam in the 100 metre freestyle event but was eliminated in the first round again.

He represented England at the 1934 British Empire Games in London, where he competed in the 100 yards freestyle and 4×200 freestyle relay events, winning a silver medal.

He was part of the British water polo team which finished eighth in the 1936 tournament. He played all seven matches.

== See also ==
- List of Commonwealth Games medallists in swimming (men)
