= Merrlees Chassels =

Scottish swimmer

Mirrlees Chassels
Personal information
- Born: 1912 Lanarkshire, Scotland
- Died: 25 March 1963 (aged 50–51) Birmingham, England

Sport
- Sport: Swimming
- Strokes: freestyle
- Club: Pollockshields Baths, Glasgow
Medal record
Men's swimming
Representing Scotland
British Empire Games
Silver medal – second place	1934 London	3×110 yd medley relay
Bronze medal – third place	1934 London	4×200 yd freestyle relay

Mirrlees Chassels (1912 – 25 March 1963) was a Scottish competitive swimmer who specialised in freestyle and represented Scotland at the 1934 British Empire Games (now Commonwealth Games), winning a two medals.

== Biography ==
Chassels was a member of the Pollockshields Baths club. In 1932, he set the 500 yards freestyle record and by September 1933 held every Scottish record from 300 yards to the 1 mile.

He represented the Scottish team and won a silver and bronze medal in the swimming events at the 1934 British Empire Games.

== See also ==
- List of Commonwealth Games medallists in swimming (men)
