= Robert Crombie =

English long jumper (c. 1911–1936)

Personal information
- Nationality: British (English)
- Born: 1911 British Guiana
- Died: May 1936 (aged 24–25) Guildford, England
- Occupation: Commercial artist

Sport
- Sport: Athletics
- Club: Mitcham Athletic Club

Robert Creswell Crombie (c. 1911 – May 1936) was a male athlete who competed for England.

== Athletics career ==
A commercial artist by trade, he was affiliated with the Mitcham Athletic Club,

He represented England at the 1934 British Empire Games in London, where he competed in the long jump event, winning a X medal.

On May 17, 1936, Crombie went missing while walking with friends in Netley Woods near Guildford, where he was "believed to have been struck by lightning while sheltering beneath a tree"; he was found dead on May 19, at age 25.
