= Selwyn Capon =

British swimmer

Personal information
- Nationality: British
- Born: 8 February 1914 Norwich, England
- Died: 25 September 1976 Hampshire, England

Sport
- Sport: Swimming
- Event: Freestyle
- Club: Cardiff SC

Selwyn Hammond Capon (8 February 1914 – 25 September 1976) was a British swimmer who specialised in freestyle and competed for Wales at the Commonwealth Games.

== Biography ==
Capon was born in Norwich, England and was a member of the Cardiff Swimming Club and attended Cardiff Technical College.

His first swimming success came in 1929, when he secured a second place finish in the 60 yards freestyle event at the Cardiff County Boy Scouts' swimming gala.

In June 1934, Capon was selected for preliminary trials for the 1934 British Empire Games team and one month later became the 100 yards freestyle Welsh champion.

He subsequently represented the Welsh team at the 1934 British Empire Games in London, where she competed in the 100 yards freestyle and helped Wales finish fourth in the 4 × 200 yards freestyle relay, with Arthur Davies, Ronald Evans and Ken Street.
