= George Anderson (swimmer) =

Scottish swimmer

Sport
- Sport: Swimming
- Strokes: freestyle
- Club: Pollockshields Baths, Glasgow
Medal record
Men's swimming
Representing Scotland
British Empire Games
Bronze medal – third place	1934 London	4×200 yd freestyle relay

George Anderson was a Scottish competitive swimmer who specialsed in freestyle and represented Scotland at the 1934 British Empire Games (now Commonwealth Games), winning a bronze medal.

== Biography ==
Anderson was a member of the Pollockshields Baths club. He represented the Scottish team and won a bronze medal in the 4×200 yd freestyle relay event at the 1934 British Empire Games in London, England.

In August 1934, he set a 200 Yards Scottish record and in October 1934 won the 50 yards Scottish championship. He continued to break records throughout 1934 and 1935.

He became a policeman and was swimming for Glasgow Police SC in 1937.

== See also ==
- List of Commonwealth Games medallists in swimming (men)
