= Arthur Davies (swimmer) =

British swimmer

Personal information
- Nationality: British (Welsh)
- Born: Wales

Sport
- Sport: Swimming
- Event: Freestyle
- Club: Cardiff SC; Cardiff University SC

Arthur G. Davies was a Welsh swimmer who specialised in freestyle and competed at the Commonwealth Games.

== Biography ==
Davies was born in Wales and was a member of the Cardiff Swimming Club and then Cardiff University Swimming Club, while he attended University College, Cardiff in 1934.

Davies was a two-time winner of prestigious Taff Swim held in Roath Park Lake in 1933 and 1934.

In August 1933, he won the Welsh half-mile championship and in June 1934 was selected for preliminary trials for the 1934 British Empire Games team

He represented the Welsh team at the 1934 British Empire Games in London, where he helped Wales finish fourth in the 4 × 200 yards freestyle relay with Selwyn Capon, Ronald Evans and Ken Street.

On 1 September 1934 he won the Welsh men's mile swimming championship.
