= Robert Harcus =

Scottish wrestler

Personal information
- Nationality: British (Scottish)
- Born: Eday, Scotland

Sport
- Sport: Wrestling
- Event: Middleweight
- Club: Holyrood, Edinburgh
Medal record
Men's freestyle wrestling
Representing Scotland
British Empire Games
Bronze medal – third place	1934 London	Middleweight

Robert Harcus was a wrestler who competed for Scotland and won a bronze medal at the British Empire Games (now Commonwealth Games).

== Biography ==
Harcus was best known for representing Scotland at the 1934 British Empire Games, where he won the bronze medal in the middleweight division of the wrestling competition at the 1934 British Empire Games in London, He finished third in his round robin pool matches to claim the bronze.

He was a member of the Holyrood wrestling club in Edinburgh and was an Orcadian (a person from the Orkney Islands). Originally from Eday, he was a policeman with the Edinburgh City Police.
