= Horace Taylor (wrestler) =

English wrestler

Personal information
- Nationality: British (English)

Sport
- Sport: Wrestling
- Events: Middleweight; Light-Heavyweight; Heavyweight
- Club: Bradford Premier WC

Horace L. Taylor was a freestyle sport wrestler who competed for England at the British Empire Games (now Commonwealth Games). After the Games he turned professional.

== Biography ==
Taylor fought out of the Bradford Premier Wrestling Club and in 1933 he was the Yorkshire middleweight champion and the Northern Counties middleweight champion.

During the 1934 Empire Games trials, Taylor won both the middleweight and heavyweight titles. He subsequently represented the England team at the 1934 British Empire Games in London, where he competed in the heavyweight event.

After the Games, Taylor turned professional participating in his first professional match on 3 December 1934.

He remained professional until 1938 and wins including betaing Val Cerino, Cab Cashford, Fred Unwin and the Farmers Boy.
