= 1934 European Aquatics Championships =

Water sport competitions

4th European Aquatics Championships
- Host city: Magdeburg
- Country: Germany
- Events: 16
- Opening: 12 August 1934
- Closing: 19 August 1934

The 1934 LEN European Aquatics Championships were held 12–19 August 1934 in Magdeburg, Germany.

== Medal table ==
* Host nation (Germany)

Rank	Nation	Gold	Silver	Bronze	Total
1	Germany*	6	9	4	19
2	Netherlands	4	2	1	7
3	Hungary	3	0	0	3
4	France	2	0	0	2
5	Great Britain	1	1	2	4
6	Italy	0	2	2	4
7	Czechoslovakia	0	1	1	2
8	Sweden	0	1	0	1
9	Denmark	0	0	4	4
10	Belgium	0	0	1	1
10	Switzerland	0	0	1	1
Totals (11 entries)		16	16	16	48

== Medal summary ==
=== Diving ===
Men's events

Event	Gold		Silver		Bronze	
3 m springboard	Leo Esser; Germany	138.75	Winfried Mahraun; Germany	129.53	Franz Leikert; Czechoslovakia	129.38
10 m highboard	Hermann Stork; Germany	98.99	Franz Leikert; Czechoslovakia	92.17	Ewald Riebschläger; Germany	90.72

Women's events

Event	Gold		Silver		Bronze	
3 m springboard	Olga Jensch-Jordan; Germany	74.78	Katinka Larsen; Great Britain	68.1	Anneliese Kapp; Germany	65.56
10 m highboard	Hertha Schieche; Germany	35.43	Ingeborg Sjöqvist; Sweden	31.54	Inger Kragh; Denmark	31.39

=== Swimming ===
Men's events

Event	Gold		Silver		Bronze	
100 m freestyle	Ferenc Csik; Hungary	59.7	Helmuth Fischer; Germany	59.8	Otto Wille; Germany	1:01.2
400 m freestyle	Jean Taris; France	4:55.5	Paolo Costoli; Italy	5:07.5	Giacomo Signori; Italy	5:11.0
1500 m freestyle	Jean Taris; France	20:01.5	Paolo Costoli; Italy	21:01.1	Norman Wainwright; Great Britain	21:10.0
100 m backstroke	John Besford; Great Britain	1:11.7	Ernst Küppers; Germany	1:12.2	Edgar Siegrist; Switzerland	1:12.6
200 m breaststroke	Erwin Sietas; Germany	2:49.0	Paul Schwarz; Germany	2:49.4	Hans Malmstrøm; Denmark	2:49.8
4 × 200 m freestyle relay	Hungary; Ödön Grof; Andras Marothy; Ferenc Csik; Árpád Lengyel	9:30.2	Germany; Heiko Schwartz; Wolfgang Leisewitz; Otto Lenkitsch; Otto Wille	9:31.2	Italy; Massimo Costa; Giacomo Signori; Guido Giunta; Paolo Costoli	9:44.1

Women's events

Event	Gold		Silver		Bronze	
100 m freestyle	Willy den Ouden; Netherlands	1:07.1	Rie Mastenbroek; Netherlands	1:08.1	Gisela Arendt; Germany	1:10.3
400 m freestyle	Rie Mastenbroek; Netherlands	5:27.4	Willy den Ouden; Netherlands	5:27.4	Lilli Andersen; Denmark	5:45.1
100 m backstroke	Rie Mastenbroek; Netherlands	1:20.3	Gisela Arendt; Germany	1:20.4	Puck Oversloot; Netherlands	1:22.2
200 m breaststroke	Martha Genenger; Germany	3:09.2	Hanni Hölzner; Germany	3:09.3	Inger Kragh; Denmark	3:13.2
4 × 100 m freestyle relay	Netherlands; Jopie Selbach; Ans Timmermans; Rie Mastenbroek; Willy den Ouden	4:41.5	Germany; Ruth Halbsguth; Ingrid Ohliger; Hilde Salbert; Gisela Arendt	4:50.4	Great Britain; Olive Bartle; Margery Hinton; Edna Hughes; Beatrice Wolstenholme	4:58.3

=== Water polo ===
Event	Gold	Silver	Bronze
Men's tournament	Hungary	Germany	Belgium

== See also ==
- List of European Championships records in swimming
