= Hans Malmstrøm =

Danish swimmer

Personal information
- Born: 15 November 1912 Frederiksberg, Denmark
- Died: 15 September 1990 (aged 77) Ordrup, Denmark

Sport
- Sport: Swimming
- Club: P08, København
Medal record
Representing Denmark
Swimming
European Championships
Bronze medal – third place	1934 Magdeburg	200 m breaststroke

Hans Malmstrøm (15 November 1912 – 15 September 1990) was a Danish swimmer who won a bronze medal in the 200 m breaststroke at the 1934 European Aquatics Championships. He competed in the same event at the 1936 Summer Olympics, but did not reach the final.
