= Athletics at the 1934 British Empire Games – Women's 880 yards =

Women's 880 yards at the Commonwealth Games

The women's 880 yards event at the 1934 British Empire Games was held on 6 August at the White City Stadium in London, England. The distance was later discontinued for women until 1962.

== Results ==
Rank	Name	Nationality	Time	Notes
1st place, gold medalist(s)	Gladys Lunn	England	2:19.4	
2nd place, silver medalist(s)	Ida Jones	England	2:21.0e	+8 yd
3rd place, bronze medalist(s)	Dorothy Butterfield	England	2:21.4e	+3 yd
4	Constance Furneaux	England	?:??.?	
5	Doris Morgan	South Africa	?:??.?	
6	Violet Smith	Canada	?:??.?	
7	Mildred Storrar	Scotland	?:??.?	
	Hilda Cameron	Canada	DNS	
	Lillian Palmer	Canada	DNS	
	Irene Storey	Canada	DNS	
	Cynthia Keay	Southern Rhodesia	DNS	
