= Dot Macready =

Jersey-born English diver

Personal information
- Nationality: British
- Born: 11 April 1908 Saint Helier, Jersey
- Died: 1994

Sport
- Sport: Diving
Medal record
Diving
Representing England
British Empire Games
Gold medal – first place	1934 London	10 Metres Platform

Edythe Amy Macready known as Dot and married name Fairbairn (1908–1994) was a Jersey female diver who competed for England.

== Diving career ==
Macready trained in the Havre des Pas Pool

Dot was the English ladies champion in 1933.

She represented England at the 1934 British Empire Games in London, where she competed in the 10 metres platform event, winning a gold medal.
