= Maurice Allwood =

Scottish wrestler

Personal information
- Nationality: British (Scottish)

Sport
- Sport: Amateur wrestling
- Event: Welterweight
- Club: Edinburgh Transport

James Maurice Allwood was a wrestler who competed for Scotland at the British Empire Games (now Commonwealth Games).

== Biography ==
Allwood was a member of the Edinburgh Transport wrestling team and won the 1933 Scottish national 11 stone 4lbs title. His brother Leonard Allwood was also a Scottish champion that year.

Allwood represented the 1934 Scottish team, at the 1934 British Empire Games in London, in the welterweight division of the wrestling competition.

Maurice was the 1935 heavweight champion of Scotland and was the 1935 British champion, winning the welterweight title at the British Wrestling Championships. The following year he was the 1936 welterweight champion of Scotland and England.
