= Edward Melrose =

Scottish wrestler

Personal information
- Nationality: British (Scottish)

Sport
- Sport: Wrestling
- Event: bantamweight
- Club: Kilmarnock
Medal record
Men's freestyle wrestling
Representing Scotland
British Empire Games
Gold medal – first place	1934 London	Bantamweight

Edward Melrose also known as Paddy Melrose was a wrestler who competed for Scotland and won a gold medal at the British Empire Games. He was the only wrestler from Great Britain to claim a gold at the Games in London.

== Biography ==
Melrose was best known for representing Scotland at the 1934 British Empire Games, where he won the gold medal in the bantamweight division of the wrestling competition at the 1934 British Empire Games in London, He won both of his round robin matches to claim the gold.

He was a member of the Kilmarnock wrestling club and in April 1934 was the only wrestler to successfully defend his Scottish national title. The following year in 1935 he won a third consecutive title.

In 1936 he was selected as a reserve for the 1936 Summer Olympics.
