= Drummond Walker =

Scottish wrestler

Personal information
- Nationality: British (Scottish)

Sport
- Sport: Wrestling
- Event: Lightweight
- Club: Denny & Dunipace AAC

Drummond Walker was a wrestler who competed for Scotland at the British Empire Games (now Commonwealth Games).

== Biography ==
Walker was the 1931 welterweight champion of Scotland and was a member of the Denny and Dunipace Amateur Athletic Club. After winning the 1934 Scottish title he was selected for the Empire Games.

Walker represented the 1934 Scottish team, at the 1934 British Empire Games in London, in the lightweight division of the wrestling competition.

After the games, Walker continued to wrestle in exhibitions and in 1938 was appointed coach of the Cumbernauld Former Pupils Athletic Club.
