= Joe Nelson (wrestler) =

British

Personal information
- Nationality: British (English)

Sport
- Sport: Wrestling
- Event: Featherweight
- Club: Bolton United Harriers & AC
Medal record
Men's freestyle wrestling
Representing England
British Empire Games
| Silver medal – second place | 1934 London | Featherweight |

Joe Nelson was an English freestyle sport wrestler.

== Wrestling career ==
Nelson was a member of the Bolton United Harriers & AC.

He represented England at the 1934 British Empire Games in London, where he competed in the featherweight division and won a silver medal.

He represented Lancashire and turned professional in the mid-thirties.
