= Ken Harris (athlete) =

Welsh athlete

Personal information
- Nationality: British (English/Welsh)
- Born: 7 October 1910 Bristol, England
- Died: November 2008 Goodrington, Devon, England

Sport
- Sport: Athletics
- Event: Middle-distance
- Club: Roath Harriers, Cardiff

Kenneth Walter Benjamin Harris (7 October 1910 – November 2008) was a British athlete, who competed at the 1934 British Empire Games (now Commonwealth Games).

== Biography ==
Harris was a member of the Roath Harriers Club in Cardiff and at the 1934 Welsh national championships, held in Newport, he won the one mile title.

He represented Wales at the 1934 British Empire Games in one athletic event; the 1 mile race, where he won his heat and reached the final.
