= Katinka Larsen =

British diver

Personal information
- Nationality: British (English)
- Born: 9 November 1905 Holborn, London
- Died: August 1999 (aged 93) Chichester, Sussex

Sport
- Sport: Diving
- Event: springboard
- Club: London DC
Medal record
Women's diving
Representing Great Britain
European Championships
Silver medal – second place	1934 Magdeburg	3 m springboard

Katinka Larsen (9 November 1905 – August 1999) was a female diver who competed at the 1936 Summer Olympics.

== Diving career ==
Larsen represented England at the 1934 British Empire Games in London, where she competed in the 3 metres springboard event.

She won a silver medal in the 3 Metres Springboard Diving at the 1934 European Aquatics Championships.

At the 1936 Olympics Games in Berlin, she finished 13th on the 3 metre springboard.

Larsen was described in 1937 as being "one of the finest divers in the world".

== Personal life ==
She married Edward F W Tinsley in March 1937 at Finchley, with the wedding cake decorated with a miniature diving board.
