= Inger Nordbø =

Danish and Norwegian diver and swimmer (1915–2004)

Personal information
- Born: Inger Kragh; 27 June 1915 Copenhagen, Denmark
- Died: 29 November 2004 (aged 89) Oslo, Norway

Sport
- Country: Denmark (before 1935), Norway (from 1935)
- Sport: Swimming; Diving
- Club: Oslo IL
Medal record
Representing Denmark
Women's diving
European Championships
Bronze medal – third place	1934 Magdeburg	10 m platform
Women's swimming
European Championships
Bronze medal – third place	1934 Magdeburg	200 m breaststroke

Inger Nordbø (née Kragh; 27 June 1915 – 29 November 2004) was a Danish/Norwegian sports swimmer and diver. She won two bronze medals at the European championships, in diving and breaststroke swimming, respectively. She competed in two Olympic games, in 1936 and 1948.

== Biography ==
Nordbø was born in Copenhagen on 27 June 1915, and became Norwegian citizen from 1935.

Competing for Denmark, then named Inger Kragh, she won a bronze medal in 200 metres breaststroke, and another bronze medal in diving, at the 1934 European Aquatics Championships in Magdeburg. She competed at the 1936 Summer Olympics in Berlin, where she finished eleventh in springboard and 12th in platform. She competed at the 1948 Summer Olympics in London.

She won a total of 54 Norwegian titles in diving, and four Nordic championships. Competing in swimming, she won two individual titles in breaststroke, and six titles in team swimming, and also one Nordic title in team swimming.

She is credited for having introduced organized synchronized swimming in Norway and was an honorary member of Oslo IL.

She died in Oslo on 29 November 2004.
