= John Laidlaw (athlete) =

Scottish athlete

Personal information
- Nationality: British (Scottish)

Sport
- Sport: Athletics
- Events: Long-distance, Cross country
- Club: Edinburgh Northern Harriers

John Pratt Laidlaw was a track and field athlete from Scotland who competed at the 1934 British Empire Games (now Commonwealth Games).

== Biography ==
Laidlaw was a member of the Edinburgh Northern Harriers, a Scottish international. and specialised in long distance running and cross country.

He represented the Scottish Empire Games team at the 1934 British Empire Games in London, England, participating in two events, the 1 mile race and the 3 miles race.

In 1935 he won the Scottish three miles title.
