= Harry Cunningham (swimmer) =

Scottish swimmer

Personal information
- Born: c.1910

Sport
- Sport: Swimming
- Strokes: freestyle
- Club: Motherwell YMI ASC
Medal record
Men's swimming
Representing Scotland
British Empire Games
Bronze medal – third place	1934 London	4×200 yd freestyle relay

Henry Cunningham (born c.1910) was a Scottish competitive swimmer who specialsed in freestyle and represented Scotland at the 1934 British Empire Games (now Commonwealth Games), winning a bronze medal.

== Biography ==
Cunningham was a member of the Motherwell Young Men's Institute ASC and in 1933 held the 150 yards Scottish record.

After a spell in England with the Oldham Police club he returned to swim for Motherwell in September 1932. He also played water polo and is recorded as saving a man from drowning in July 1933.

He represented the Scottish team and won a bronze medal in the 4×200 yd freestyle relay event at the 1934 British Empire Games in London, England.

In 1935, he was a cadet at the RAF depot in Uxbridge and was swimming for Yiewsley and West Drayton SC.

== See also ==
- List of Commonwealth Games medallists in swimming (men)
