= Olive Bartle =

English swimmer (1912–1994)

Personal information
- Nationality: British (English)
- Born: 10 September 1912 Lewisham, England
- Died: 10 April 1994 (aged 81) Hackney, England

Sport
- Sport: Swimming
- Event: freestyle
- Club: Kingston & Croydon Swimming Clubs
Medal record
Swimming
Representing England
British Empire Games
Bronze medal – third place	1934 London	4×110 yd freestyle relay
Representing Great Britain
European Aquatics Championships
Bronze medal – third place	1934 Magdeburg	4×100 m freestyle relay

Olive Mary Bartle (1912-1994) was a female swimmer who competed for England.

== Career ==
Bartle represented England at the 1934 British Empire Games in London, where she competed in the 4×110 yard freestyle relay event, winning a bronze medal.

Bartle was the southern counties 220 yards freestyle champion and represented England in the 1934 European Games in Magdeburg. She swam for the Kingston & Croydon Swimming Clubs.

== Personal life ==
She married Ralph Banfield in 1937.
