= František Leikert =

Czech diver

Personal information
- Nickname: Franz
- Nationality: Czech
- Born: 6 May 1914 Dresden, German Empire
- Died: 18 April 1944 (aged 29) Eastern Front

Sport
- Sport: Diving
Medal record
Men's diving
Representing Czechoslovakia
European Championships
Silver medal – second place	1934 Magdeburg	10 m highboard
Bronze medal – third place	1934 Magdeburg	3 m springboard

František Leikert (6 May 1914 – 18 April 1944) was a diver who competed for Czechoslovakia. He competed at the 1936 Summer Olympics in Berlin, where he placed 16th in 10 metre platform and 9th in springboard.
