= William Mackenzie (hammer thrower) =

British athlete

Personal information
- Nationality: British (Scottish)

Sport
- Sport: Athletics
- Event: Hammer throw
- Club: Field Events Club, Edinburgh
Medal record
Men's Athletics
Representing Scotland
British Empire Games
Bronze medal – third place	1934 London	Hammer throw

William Mackenzie was a Scottish athlete who competed and won a bronze medal at the 1934 British Empire Games (now Commonwealth Games).

== Biography ==
Mackenzie competed in the hammer throw event at the 1934 British Empire Games in London, England, where he won the bronze medal as part of the Scottish Empire Games team.

He was a member of the Field Events Club which was based in Edinburgh.

Mackenzie finished third behind Fred Warngård in the hammer throw event at the 1935 AAA Championships.
