= Arthur Summers =

British

Personal information
- Nationality: British (English)
- Born: 1909
- Died: 19 January 1937 (aged 28) Hornsey, England

Sport
- Sport: Swimming
- Event: breaststroke
- Club: Penguin Swimming Club
Medal record
Swimming
Representing England
British Empire Games
Bronze medal – third place	1934 London	3×110 yd medley relay

Arthur C. E. Summers (1909 – 19 January 1937) was a swimmer who competed for England.

== Career ==
Summers specialised in breaststroke and was a member of the Penguin Swimming Club.

He represented England at the 1934 British Empire Games in London, where he competed in the 3×110 medley relay event, winning a bronze medal.

== Personal life ==
He married Lily Chapman in 1930 but was found dead in his bath at his home in Hornsey just seven years later: the death was reported from as natural causes.
