= Kenneth Scott (swimmer) =

British swimmer (1911–1990)

Personal information
- Nationality: British (English)
- Born: 29 January 1911 Wycombe, England
- Died: 12 August 1990 (aged 79) Poole, England

Sport
- Sport: Swimming
- Event: backstroke
- Club: Hampstead Priory SC; Clacton SC

Kenneth Thomas Scott (29 January 1937 – 12 August 1990) was an international swimmer who competed for England at the British Empire Games (now Commonwealth Games).

== Biography ==
Scott was educated at University College School and specialised in backstroke swimming. He was the school's swimming captain and won the school's championpionship for five consecutive years.

Scott studied medicine at Emmanuel College, Cambridge and in June 1934 was awarded a half blue for swimming after winning four of the six events at the freshman's sports. He was selected to represent the England team at the 1934 British Empire Games in London, where he finished fifth in the 100 yards backstroke final,

He was a member of the Hampstead Priory Swimming Club, and shortly after the Games in September 1934 he became the Southern Counties champion over 150 yards backstroke.

He qualified as a doctor and after Cambridge and in 1937 was at St Bartholomew's Hospital. He was swimming for Clacton Swimming Club in 1939 and was based at Woking and District Victoria Hospital. It was at the Woking hospital that he took the position of medical superintendent in March 1939 and during World War II joined the Indian medical service.
