= Elspeth Parker =

Scottish swimmer

Sport
- Sport: Swimming
- Strokes: freestyle, backstroke
- Club: Western Baths, Glasgow

Elspeth Parker was a Scottish competitive swimmer who specialised in freestyle and represented Scotland at the 1934 British Empire Games (now Commonwealth Games).

== Biography ==
Parker was a member of the Western Baths in Glasgow and at the Empire Games swimming trials at Port Seton, Parker won the 100 yards freestyle event.

She subsequently represented the Scottish Empire Games team at the 1934 British Empire Games in London, England, participating in the 4 x 100 yards freestyle relay event.

Parker was the 1937 Scottish champion over 200 yards the 150 yards champion and record holder and the 1938 backstroke champion and record holder.
