= Madge McCallum =

Scottish swimmer

Sport
- Sport: Swimming
- Strokes: freestyle
- Club: Renfrew Baths
Medal record
Women's swimming
Representing Scotland
British Empire Games
Bronze medal – third place	1934 London	3×110 yd medley relay

Margaret McCallum was a Scottish competitive swimmer who specialsed in freestyle and represented Scotland at the 1934 British Empire Games (now Commonwealth Games), winning a bronze medal.

== Biography ==
McCallum was a member of the Renfrew Baths club and in 1932, she finished runner-up in the Scottish 200 yards freestyle championship. She was the 1933 Scottish 100 yards freestyle junior champion and in addition to freestyle, was competent in both backstroke and breaststroke.

She represented the Scottish team and won a bronze medal in the 3×110 yd medley relay event at the 1934 British Empire Games in London, England.

In 1935, she was the Scottish breaststroke champion and record holder.

== See also ==
- List of Commonwealth Games medallists in swimming (women)
