= Arthur Perrow =

Welsh diver

Personal information
- Nationality: British (Welsh)
- Born: 2 February 1901 Merthyr Tydfil, Wales
- Died: 20 November 1979 Portland, Oregon, USA

Sport
- Sport: Diving
- Event: Platform
- Club: Highgate DC

Arthur Bevan Perrow (2 February 1901 – 20 November 1979) was a Welsh diver, who competed at the 1934 British Empire Games (now Commonwealth Games).

== Biography ==
Perrow was a member of the Highgate Diving Club and in 1933 finished third in the Welsh diving championship.

Perrow appeared in various exhibitions throughout 1933 and 1934, before representing Wales at the 1934 British Empire Games in the 10 metres platform event, where he finished in fourth place.
