= Cecily Cousens =

English diver

Personal information
- Nationality: British (English)
- Born: 30 June 1918 Swindon, England
- Died: 10 October 2008 (aged 90) Norwich, England

Sport
- Sport: Diving
- Event: platform
- Club: Coates Amateur, Swindon
Medal record
Diving
Representing England
British Empire Games
Bronze medal – third place	1934 London	10 Metres Platform

Cecily Edith Mary Cousens (30 June 1918 – 10 October 2008) was a female diver who competed for England.

== Biography ==
Cousens represented England at the 1934 British Empire Games in London, where she competed in the 10 metres platform event, winning a bronze medal.

The following year she was the National Diving Champion in 1935.
