= Murdoch White =

Scottish wrestler

Personal information
- Nationality: British (Scottish)

Sport
- Sport: Wrestling
- Event: Featherweight
- Club: Edinburgh Transport
Medal record
Men's freestyle wrestling
Representing Scotland
British Empire Games
Bronze medal – third place	1934 London	Featherweight

Murdoch White was a wrestler who competed for Scotland and won a bronze medal at the British Empire Games (now Commonwealth Games).

== Biography ==
White was best known for representing Scotland at the 1934 British Empire Games, where he won the bronze medal in the featherweight division of the wrestling competition at the 1934 British Empire Games in London, He finished third in his round robin pool matches to claim the bronze.

He was a member of the Edinburgh Transport club and was also a competent swimmer and worked for the Edinburgh Fire Brigade.
