= James Caie =

Scottish athlete

Personal information
- Nationality: British (Scottish)
- Born: 18 January 1905 Aberdeen, Scotland
- Died: July 1971 (aged 66) Camberwell, England

Sport
- Sport: Athletics
- Event(s): Long-distance, cross-country
- Club: South London Harriers

James Martin Brand Caie (18 January 1905 – July 1971) was a track and field athlete from Scotland who competed at the 1934 British Empire Games (now Commonwealth Games).

== Biography ==
Caie was born in Aberdeen, Scotland but lived in London his entire life. He was a member of the South London Harriers, a club he joined in 1923.

At the 1934 Scottish AAA Championships he won the 3 miles title. At the time he was working for the Bank of England.

He represented the Scottish Empire Games team at the 1934 British Empire Games in London, England, participating in one event, the 3 miles race.
