= Jack Walker (athlete) =

British

Personal information
- Nationality: British (English)

Sport
- Sport: Athletics
- Event: Pole vault
- Club: Port Sunlight AC; Oxford University AC

John Howard Walker known as Jack Walker, was a male athlete who competed for England.

== Biography ==
Walker studied at The Queen's College, Oxford.

Walker represented Port Sunlight Athletic Club and Oxford University.

He represented England at the 1934 British Empire Games in London, where he competed in the pole vault event.
