= Beatrice Wolstenholme =

English swimmer

Personal information
- Nationality: British (English)
- Born: 17 December 1919 Withington, Manchester, England
- Died: 5 October 2008 (aged 88)

Sport
- Sport: Swimming
- Event: freestyle
- Club: Moss Side Swim Club
Medal record
Women's swimming
Representing Great Britain
European Championships
Bronze medal – third place	1934 Magdeburg	4×100 m freestyle
Representing England
British Empire Games
Bronze medal – third place	1934 London	4×110 yd freestyle

Beatrice "Trix" Wolstenholme (later Whalen, 17 Dec 1919 – 5 October 2008) was an English freestyle swimmer who competed in the 1934 British Empire Games.

== Early life and swimming career ==
She was born in Withington, Manchester, the daughter of Duerden Wolstenholme and Mary Wolstenholme, and the younger sister of Cecelia Wolstenholme. She attended St. Paul's School. She was a member of the Moss Side Swim Club, and trained with coaches Jack and Nellie Laverty. She was called "the most wonderful girl swimmer England has ever known" and "wonder girl swimmer" in 1932 newspaper reports.

She represented England at the 1934 British Empire Games in London, where she competed in the 440 yards freestyle and 4×100 freestyle relay events, winning a bronze medal.

== Later years ==
Wolstenholme married American soldier William Whalen III in 1945, and moved to the United States. They had five children. She continued to teach swimming into her later years, and was aquatics director at the YMCA in New Bedford, Massachusetts. In 1997, she attended an event to dedicate a pool in Hamilton, Ontario. She died in 2008, at the age of 88, in New Bedford.
