= Louis Marchant =

British diver

Personal information
- Nationality: British (English)
- Born: 5 July 1916 Wandsworth, England
- Died: 1983 (aged 67) Chipping Barnet, England

Sport
- Sport: Diving
- Event: Platform
- Club: Highgate Diving Club
Medal record
Men's diving
Representing Great Britain
European Championships
Bronze medal – third place	1947 Monte Carlo	10 m platform
Representing England
British Empire Games
Bronze medal – third place	1934 London	10 m platform

Louis Walter George Marchant (5 July 1916 – 1983) was an English diver who competed at the 1948 Summer Olympics.

== Biography ==
Marchant was born in Wandsworth, London and was a member of the Highgate Diving Club.

Marchant represented England at the 1934 British Empire Games in London, where he competed in the 10 metres platform event, winning a bronze medal.

At the 1948 Olympic Games in London, he also competed in the men's 10 metre platform event.
