= Wrestling at the 1934 British Empire Games =

- Venue: Wembley Empire Pool
- Location: London, England
- Dates: 4 – 11 August 1934

At the 1934 British Empire Games, the wrestling competition was held in London, England, and featured contests in seven weight classes.

The wrestling events were held at the Wembley Empire Pool.

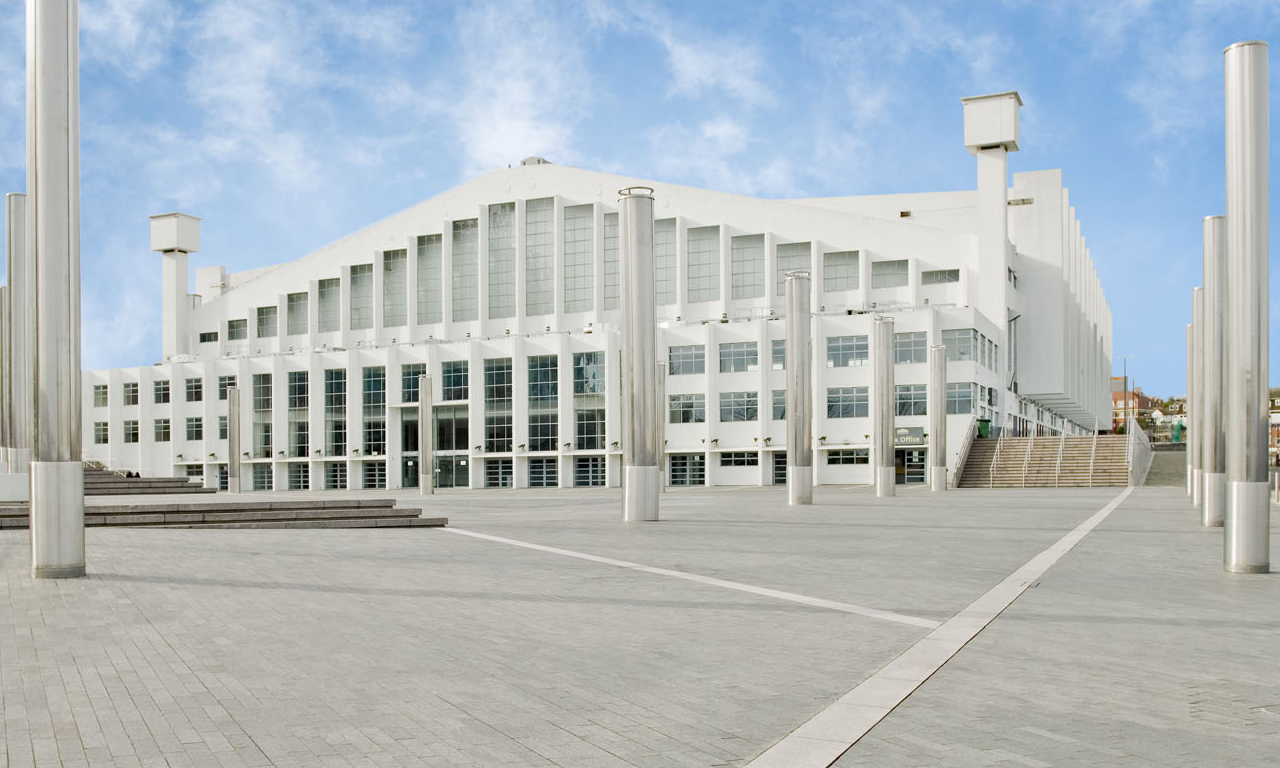
The newly opened Wembley Empire Pool hosted aquatics, boxing and wrestling (Pmsphoto at en.wikipedia)

Wrestlers in each weight division would compete in a round-robin to determine final positions.

== Medal table ==
* Host nation (England)

Medals won by nation with totals, ranked by number of golds—sortable
Rank	Nation	Gold	Silver	Bronze	Total
1	Canada (CAN)	3	2	2	7
2	Australia (AUS)	2	0	0	2
3	Scotland (SCO)	1	0	3	4
4	South Africa (SAF)	1	0	0	1
5	England (ENG)*	0	5	1	6
6	India (IND)	0	0	1	1
Totals (6 entries)		7	7	7	21

=== Medallists ===
All events were for men only.

Event	Gold	Silver	Bronze
Bantamweight	Edward Melrose (SCO)	Ted McKinley (CAN)	Joseph Reid (ENG)
Featherweight	Robert McNab (CAN)	Joe Nelson (ENG)	Murdoch White (SCO)
Lightweight	Dick Garrard (AUS)	G. E. North (ENG)	Howard Thomas (CAN)
Welterweight	Joe Schleimer (CAN)	William Fox (ENG)	Rashid Anwar (IND)
Middleweight	Terry Evans (CAN)	Stanley Bissell (ENG)	Robert Harcus (SCO)
Light heavyweight	Mick Cubbin (SAF)	Bernard Rowe (ENG)	Alex Watt (CAN)
Heavyweight	Jack Knight (AUS)	Pat Meehan (CAN)	Archie Dudgeon (SCO)

=== Round robin ===
Weight	Winner	Loser	Score
Bantamweight
	Edward Melrose (SCO)	Joseph Reid (ENG)	w/o
	Ted McKinley (CAN)	Joseph Reid (ENG)	2min 12 sec
	Edward Melrose (SCO)	Ted McKinley (CAN)	1min 25sec
Featherweight
	Robert McNab (CAN)	Joe Nelson (ENG)	10min 45sec
	Ajaib Singh (IND)	(Southern Rhodesia) K. Young	5min 36sec
	Murdoch White (SCO)	Ajaib Singh (IND)	Points
	Robert McNab (CAN)	(Southern Rhodesia) K. Young	50sec
	Joe Nelson (ENG)	Murdoch White (SCO)	13min 59sec
	Robert McNab (CAN)	Ajaib Singh (IND)	69sec
	Robert McNab (CAN)	Murdoch White (SCO)	20sec
Lightweight
	Dick Garrard (AUS)	Joseph Burroughs (WAL)	65sec
	G. E. North (ENG)	Drummond Walker (SCO)	4min 30sec
	Howard Thomas (CAN)	Joseph Burroughs (WAL)	ret injury
	Dick Garrard (AUS)	G. E. North (ENG)	2min 13sec
	Dick Garrard (AUS)	Howard Thomas (CAN)	points
	G. E. North (ENG)	Howard Thomas (CAN)	points
	Howard Thomas (CAN)	Drummond Walker (SCO)	w/o
Welterweight
	Joe Schleimer (CAN)	Maurice Allwood (SCO)	2min 59sec
	William Fox (ENG)	Rashid Anwar (IND)	15min-points
	Maurice Allwood (SCO)	Leonard Morgan (WAL)	5min 4sec
	Joe Schleimer (CAN)	William Fox (ENG)	3min 10 sec
	Rashid Anwar (IND)	Leonard Morgan (WAL)	5min 4sec
	William Fox (ENG)	Maurice Allwood (SCO)	2min 55sec
	Joe Schleimer (CAN)	Rashid Anwar (IND)	6min 23sec
Middleweight
	Terry Evans (CAN)	Stanley Bissell (ENG)	8min 27 sec
	Terry Evans (CAN)	Robert Harcus (SCO)	8min 17sec
	Stanley Bissell (ENG)	Robert Harcus (SCO)	11min 26 sec
Light heavyweight
	Mick Cubbin (SAF)	Bernard Rowe (ENG)	2min 17sec
	Alex Watt (CAN)	Allan Brodie (SCO)	2min 59sec
	Bernard Rowe (ENG)	Alex Watt (CAN)	1min 41sec
	Mick Cubbin (SAF)	Alex Watt (CAN)	1min 41sec
	Mick Cubbin (SAF)	Allan Brodie (SCO)	2mins 21sec
Heavyweight
	Jack Knight (AUS)	Horace Taylor (ENG)	3min 51sec
	Pat Meehan (CAN)	Archie Dudgeon (SCO)	10min 43sec
	Jack Knight (AUS)	Pat Meehan (CAN)	points
	Jack Knight (AUS)	Archie Dudgeon (SCO)	6min 25sec
	Archie Dudgeon (SCO)	Horace Taylor (ENG)	5min 40sec
