= Mildred Storrar =

Scottish athlete

Personal information
- Nationality: British (Scottish)
- Born: 9 March 1915 Alberta, Canada
- Died: 7 September 1985 (aged 70) Livingstone, Scotland

Sport
- Sport: Athletics
- Event(s): Middle-distance, cross country
- Club: Dundee Hawhill Harriers

Mildred Clark Storrar (9 March 1915 – 7 September 1985) was a track and field athlete from Scotland who competed at the 1934 British Empire Games (now Commonwealth Games).

== Biography ==
Storrar was a member of the Dundee Hawhill Harriers and finished runner-up in the 1933 Scottish WAAA Championships over 880 yards.

She won the 1934 Scottish cross country title.

Storrar represented the Scottish Empire Games team at the 1934 British Empire Games in London, England, participating in one event, the 880 yards.
