= Margot Hamilton =

Scottish swimmer

Personal information
- Born: 12 December 1918 Glasgow, Scotland

Sport
- Sport: Swimming
- Strokes: backstroke, freestyle
- Club: Western Baths, Glasgow
Medal record
Women's swimming
Representing Scotland
British Empire Games
Silver medal – second place	1934 London	100 yd backstroke
Bronze medal – third place	1934 London	3×110 yd medley
Bronze medal – third place	1938 Sydney	110 yd backstroke

Margaret Anne Hamilton (born 12 December 1918) was a Scottish competitive swimmer, who specialised in backstroke and freestyle. She represented Scotland at two British Empire Games (now Commonwealth Games), winning a three medals.

== Biography ==
Hamilton was educated at Laurel Bank School and was a member of the Western Baths club. In 1933, she was the Western Counties champion.

She represented the Scottish team and won a silver and bronze medal in the swimming events at the 1934 British Empire Games. Hamilton won the 1934 and 1935 Scottish 200 freestyle championship.

In 1938, she participated in a second British Empire Games, taking part in the swimming events at the 1938 British Empire Games in Sydney, Australia. Despite suffering from an ankle injury and sunstroke during the Games she won a bronze medal in the 110 yards backstroke event. At the time of the Games, she was living at 10 Highburgh Terrace in Glasgow.

== Family ==
Her brother Norman Hamilton swam at the 1934 British Empire Games, winning two medals.

== See also ==
- List of Commonwealth Games medallists in swimming (women)
