= Len Tongue =

Welsh athlete

Personal information
- Nationality: British (Welsh)
- Born: 17 January 1912 Newport, Wales

Sport
- Sport: Athletics
- Event: Middle-distance / cross-country
- Club: Newport Harriers

Leonard William Tongue (17 January 1912 – date of death unknown) was a Welsh athlete, who competed at the 1934 British Empire Games (now Commonwealth Games).

== Biography ==
Tongue was a member of the Newport Harriers Athletics Club, where his brother Harold Robinson Tongue was also a prominent athlete. Len won the 1933 Welsh junior cross-country championships. At the 1934 Welsh national championships, held in Newport, he won the 3 miles title.

He represented Wales at the 1934 British Empire Games in one athletic event; the 3 miles event. In 1935 he retained his 3 miles Welsh national title.

He suffered from a foot injury which forced him to race less and in October 1936 he gained an appointment in Glasgow with John Brown & Company.
