= Audrey Hancock =

British swimmer

Personal information
- Nationality: British (English)
- Born: 28 February 1919 Dudley, England
- Died: 21 October 2017 (aged 98)

Sport
- Sport: Swimming
- Event: Backstroke
- Club: Dudley Ladies SC

Audrey Hancock (28 February 1919 – 21 October 2017) was a British swimmer who competed at the 1936 Summer Olympics.

== Biography ==
Hancock was born in Dudley, England and was a member of the Dudley Ladies Swimming Club.

She was the amateur backstroke lady champion of the Midlands and represented England at the 1934 British Empire Games in London, where she competed in the 100 yards backstroke event.

At the 1936 Olympic Game sin berlin, Hancock competed in women's 100 metre backstroke.
