= Reg Nicholls (athlete) =

English marathon runner

Personal information
- Nationality: British (English)
- Born: 12 January 1907 Wallingford, England
- Died: January 1974 (aged 66–67) Sheffield, England

Sport
- Sport: Athletics
- Event: long-distance
- Club: Reading AC; Wallingford Imperial AC

Reginald Frank James Nicholls (12 January 1907 – January 1974) was an athlete who competed for England.

== Biography ==
Nicholls was a member of the Reading AC, where he also served as honorary secretary.

Nicholls finished runner-up to Dunky Wright in the 1934 Polytechnic Marathon.

He represented England at the 1934 British Empire Games in London, where he competed in the marathon event.
