= Willie Burns (swimmer) =

Scottish swimmer

Personal information
- Born: 18 November 1910 Anderston, Glasgow, Scotland
- Died: 9 October 1967 (aged 56) Troon, Scotland

Sport
- Sport: Swimming
- Strokes: freestyle
- Club: Maryhill Victoria; Thistle; Glasgow Police
Medal record
Men's swimming
Representing Scotland
British Empire Games
Bronze medal – third place	1934 London	4×200 yd freestyle relay

William Burns (18 November 1910 – 9 October 1967) was a Scottish competitive swimmer who specialsed in freestyle and represented Scotland at the 1934 British Empire Games (now Commonwealth Games), winning a bronze medal. He was also selected for the 1928 Summer Olympics for the relay team.

== Biography ==
Burns was a member of the Maryhill Victoria club and was the Scottish junior and Western Counties champion in 1926. By 1928 he was swimming for the Thistle Club, Glasgow and was breaking Scottish records.

Burns was selected for the Great Britain 4×200 metres freestyle relay team for the 1928 Olympic Games in Amsterdam but did not start. In 1931 he was described as being one of the greatest swimmers that Scotland had ever produced. By 1933 and swimming for the Glasgow Police club he had held every Scottish championship from 50 yards to long distance and was once again considered to be one of Scotland's outstanding post-war swimmers.

He represented the Scottish team and won a bronze medal in the 4×200 yd freestyle relay event at the 1934 British Empire Games in London, England.

By trade he was a Glasgow police inspector.

== See also ==
- List of Commonwealth Games medallists in swimming (men)
