= Arthur Lewis (shot putter) =

Welsh athlete

Personal information
- Nationality: British (Welsh)

Sport
- Sport: Athletics
- Event: Shot put
- Club: Exeter Harriers

Arthur William Lewis was a British athlete, who competed for Wales at the 1934 British Empire Games (now Commonwealth Games).

== Biography ==
Lewis attended the Crediton Grammar School and was a member of the Exeter Harriers Athletics Club. At the 1934 Welsh national championships, held in Newport, he won the putting the weight (shot put) title.

He represented Wales at the 1934 British Empire Games in one athletic events; the shot put event.

In 1935 and 1936 he retained his Welsh national shot put title.
