= Allan Brodie (wrestler) =

Scottish wrestler (1912 – 1996)

Personal information
- Nationality: British (Scottish)
- Born: 8 August 1912 Kilmorich Argyll, Scotland
- Died: 31 August 1996 Aberdeen, Scotland

Sport
- Sport: Wrestling
- Event: Light-heavyweight
- Club: Metropolitan Police

Allan Brodie (8 August 1912 – 31 August 1996) was a wrestler who competed for Scotland at the British Empire Games (now Commonwealth Games).

== Biography ==
Brodie was born in Kilmorich Argyll, Scotland, but moved to Aberdeenshire at the age of 14 and became a ghillie and keeper on the Glen Tanar Estates. Aged 20 he then moved to London to join the Metropolitan Police. He later became a detective-sergeant with the Flying Squad.

Brodie was a member of the Metropolitan Police wrestliing team and was the Scottish light-heavy wrestling champion.

He represented the 1934 Scottish team, at the 1934 British Empire Games in London, and was the Scottish light-heavy wrestling champion. in the light-heavyweight division of the wrestling competition.

During World War II he won the Distinguished Flying Cross (DFC).
