= Norman Hamilton (swimmer) =

British swimmer (1913–1986)

Personal information
- Born: 5 June 1913 Glasgow, Scotland
- Died: 25 January 1986 (aged 72) Crowborough, East Sussex, England

Sport
- Sport: Swimming
- Strokes: breaststroke, freestyle
- Club: Western Baths, Glasgow
Medal record
Men's swimming
Representing Scotland
British Empire Games
Gold medal – first place	1934 London	200 yd breaststroke
Silver medal – second place	1934 London	3×110 yd medley

Norman Hamilton (5 June 1913 – 25 January 1986) was a Scottish competitive swimmer and breaststroke specialist who represented Scotland and won a gold medal at the 1934 British Empire Games (now Commonwealth Games).

== Biography ==
Hamilton was a member of the Western Baths club and was the Scottish champion and record holder over 200 yards breaststroke.

He represented the Scottish team and won a gold and silver medal in the swimming events at the 1934 British Empire Games.

In November 1934 he reduced his 200 yards record even further with a time of 2 minutes 37, 4/5sec.

== Family ==
His sister Margot Hamilton swam at the 1934 and 1938 British Empire Games, winning two medals.

== See also ==
- List of Commonwealth Games medallists in swimming (men)
