= Anthony Watson (shot putter) =

British athlete

Personal information
- Nationality: British (English)
- Born: 1910
- Died: 1970 (aged 59–60) London, England

Sport
- Sport: Athletics
- Event: Shot put
- Club: Milocarian AC

Anthony James Arnaud Watson (1910-1970) was a male athlete who competed for England.

== Biography ==
Watson served with the Queen's Royal Regiment and was a member of Milocarian Athletic Club, a club formed for the three Service Colleges of Royal Military College Sandhurst, The Royal Military Academy Woolwich and The Air Force College Cranwell.

He represented England at the 1934 British Empire Games in London, where he competed in the shot put event.
