= Les Wade =

Canadian middle-distance runner

Personal information
- Born: 8 April 1909 Montreal, Quebec, Canada
- Died: 5 May 1980 (aged 71) Ithaca, New York, U.S.

Sport
- Sport: Middle-distance running
- Event: 1500 metres

Leslie Wichbold Wade (8 April 1909 – 5 May 1980) was a Canadian middle-distance runner, who was Canada's national record holder in the mile run and 3000 metres during the early 1930s. Wade further was a Canadian competitor for the men's 1500 metres at the 1932 Summer Olympics.

In 1933, Wade set the Native Canadian record for the mile run at 4:22.8. Wade set Canada's 3000-metre record in 1935, shaving 11 seconds off Canadian runner Mervyn Gale's record and lowering it to 8 minutes and 59.6 seconds.

Wade died in Ithaca, New York in 1971, aged 71.
