= Peggy Gould =

British swimmer

Personal information
- Nationality: British (Welsh)
- Born: Q3. 1922 Cardiff, Wales

Sport
- Sport: Swimming, Diving
- Event(s): Backstroke, Freestyle
- Club: Roath Park SC, Cardiff

Margaret Gould (born 1922) is a former Welsh swimmer and diver, who was the youngest competitor at the 1934 Commonwealth Games.

== Biography ==
Gould was born in Cardiff, Wales and was a member of the Roath Park Swimming Club of Cardiff and in 1933 was the Welsh junior diving champion at just 11-years-old.

Gould impressed throughout 1933 and the early part of 1934 and in June 1934 was selected for preliminary trials for the 1934 British Empire Games team At the age of 12, she subsequently represented the Welsh team at the 1934 British Empire Games in London, where she helped Wales finish fifth in the 4 × 100 yards freestyle relay, with Irene Evans, Valerie Davies and Jeanne Greenland.

In 1936, she set a new Welsh junior record of 70 3-5 sec over the freestyle course and in 1937 won the Welsh backstroke title. Gould was a Welsh winner of the prestigious Taff Swim held in Roath Park Lake in 1938.
