= Irene Pirie =

Canadian swimmer (1914–1998)

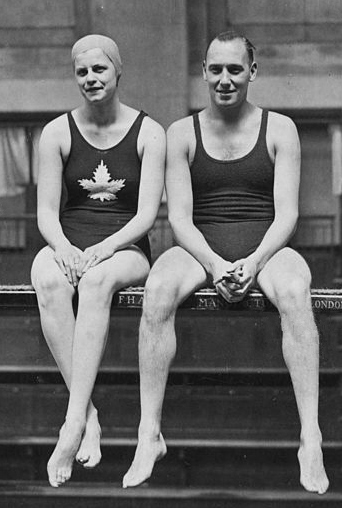
- Pirie and Milton in 1935

Personal information
- Full name: Irene Catherine Pirie-Milton
- National team: Canada
- Born: June 7, 1914 Toronto, Ontario, Canada
- Died: December 1998, aged 84 Cheltenham, Gloucestershire, England

Sport
- Sport: Swimming
- Strokes: Freestyle
Medal record
Women's swimming
Representing Canada
British Empire Games
Gold medal – first place	1934 London	4×100 yd freestyle
Silver medal – second place	1930 Hamilton	4×100 yd freestyle
Silver medal – second place	1934 London	100 yd freestyle
Bronze medal – third place	1934 London	440 yd freestyle

Irene Catherine Pirie-Milton (née Pirie; June 7, 1914 – December 1998), was a Canadian champion swimmer who competed internationally in freestyle events.

At the 1930 British Empire Games in Hamilton, Ontario, she was a member of the Canadian team which won the silver medal in the 4×100-yard freestyle relay event. At the Games she met English swimmer Frederick Milton.

In 1935 Pirie married Frederick Milton, both she and her brother Bob Pirie competed at the 1936 Olympics. At the 1934 British Empire Games in London, she won a gold medal with the Canadian team in the 4×100-yard relay competition. She also won a silver medal in the 100-yard freestyle and a bronze medal in the 440 yard freestyle.

At the 1932 Summer Olympics in Los Angeles, she was a member of the Canadian team which finished fourth in the women's 4×100-metre freestyle relay. She also participated in the 100-metre freestyle and 400-metre freestyle, but in both she was eliminated in the first round. Four years later at the 1936 Summer Olympics in Berlin, Germany, she was on the Canadian team that finished fourth in the 4×100 metre freestyle relay. Individually, she competed in the first round of the 100-metre freestyle event, but did not advance.

Pirie was a sister of Canadian swimmer Bob Pirie, the wife of British swimmer and water polo player Frederick Milton, and the mother of British swimmer Hamilton Milton. She was inducted into the Canadian Olympic Hall of Fame in 1975. In Ontario, the Irene Pirie Trophy is awarded by Swim Ontario to the female swimmer of the year selected by the Ontario Swimming Coaches Association; the male swimmer of the year is awarded the Bob Pirie Trophy.
