= Cyril Allen =

English athlete

Personal information
- Nationality: British (English)
- Born: 11 January 1915
- Died: 1985 (aged 70)

Sport
- Sport: Athletics
- Event: middle-distance
- Club: Highgate Harriers
Medal record
Athletics
Representing England
British Empire Games
Silver medal – second place	1934 London	3 Miles

Cyril Kenneth Allen (11 January 1915 – 1985) was an English athlete who competed for England at the 1934 British Empire Games.

== Biography ==
Allen finished third behind Janusz Kusociński in the 3 miles event at the 1934 AAA Championships.

Shortly afterwards, he represented England at the 1934 British Empire Games, where he won asilver medal in the 3 miles event.
