= Horace Craske =

British

Personal information
- Nationality: British (English)
- Born: 1910 Hampshire, England

Sport
- Sport: Athletics
- Event: middle-distance
- Club: South London Harriers

Horace Mervin Craske (born 1910 - date of death unknown) was a male athlete who competed for England at the British Empire Games.

== Biography ==
Craske represented England at the 1934 British Empire Games in London, where he competed in the 1 mile event.

Craske represented the South London Harriers.
