= Peter Beveridge (diver) =

English diver

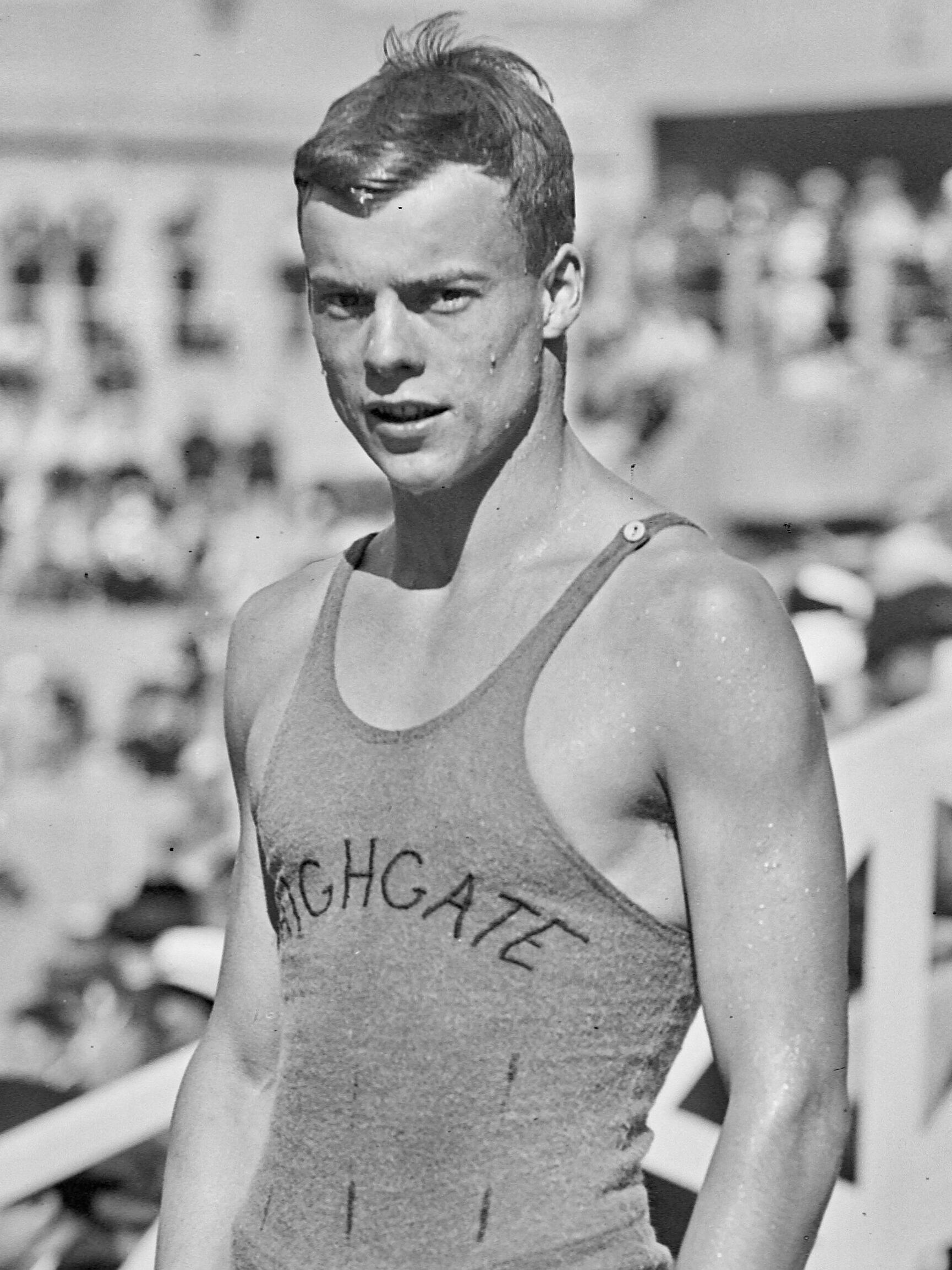
- Peter Beveridge in 1933

Personal information
- Nationality: British (English)
- Employer(s): Aquatic Enterprises, Ltd.

Sport
- Sport: Diving
- Club: Highgate Diving Club
- Turned pro: 1939

Achievements and titles
- Commonwealth finals: 1934 British Empire Games

Peter H Beveridge was a British diver who competed for England at the 1934 British Empire Games. He served as honorary secretary of the Highgate Diving Club, an early British diving club founded in 1928. After turning professional, he served as managing director of Aquatic Enterprises, Ltd., producing and performing in the first British water show, which toured seaside baths across England.

== Diving career ==
In 1933, Beveridge placed third in the men's inter-club springboard diving contest at the Highgate Club gala, behind German national champion and Olympian Leo Esser and fellow Highgate Club diver Doug Tomalin.

Beveridge competed in the 3-metre springboard event at the 1934 British Empire Games in London, where he placed fourth, while Tomalin won silver. He also toured Europe with other English divers.

=== 1939 Water Show ===
In 1939, he turned professional and appeared in what was billed as the first British water show, featuring as the host and performing together with former international diver Helen Orr, in what they called "a symphony of grace and rhythm from the diving board". Beveridge produced the show as managing director of Aquatic Enterprises, Ltd., and took the entertainment programme to outdoor pools in Peterborough, New Brighton, Hastings, Bournemouth, Weston-super-Mare, Scarborough, Jersey, Guernsey, and many other locations. The water show included other acts such as seven "Aquabelles" in a water ballet; American diving trapeze artist Larry Griswold; British water comedian Jimmy Johnson; American acrobatic diver Jimmy Rae; and Canadian Harris S. Congden, who performed canoe stunts including a parachute jump from thirty-three feet. At the time, it was unusual for British commercial ventures to be granted permits to bring American sports entertainers to the UK. A review in The Croydon Advertiser said that the show was "really first-class entertainment" and "a welcome breakaway from the stereotyped swimming gala", suggesting that "the bathing pool may provide a real rival to the variety stage."
