= Tommy Mather =

British diver (1908–1982)

Personal information
- Born: 15 August 1908 London, England
- Died: 2 February 1982 (aged 73) Sutton, London, England

Sport
- Sport: Diving
- Event: Platform
- Club: Highgate Diving Club; ASC, London
Medal record
Diving
Representing England
British Empire Games
| Gold medal – first place | 1934 London | 10 Metres Platform |

Thomas James Mather (15 August 1908 – 2 February 1982) was a British diver who competed in the 1928 Summer Olympics.

== Biography ==
At the 1928 Olympic Games in Amsterdam, Mather participated in the 10 metre platform event.

He represented England at the 1934 British Empire Games in London, where he competed in the 10 metres platform event, winning a gold medal.
