= Phyllis Haslam =

Indian-Canadian swimmer (1913–1991)

Personal information
- Born: May 24, 1913 Dharmsala, India
- Died: August 23, 1991 (aged 78) Toronto, Canada

Sport
- Sport: Swimming
Medal record
Representing Canada
British Empire Games
Gold medal – first place	1934 London	3x110yd medley relay
Silver medal – second place	1934 London	200yd breaststroke

Phyllis Georgie Haslam OC (24 May 1913 – 23 August 1991) was an Indian-Canadian swimmer and social worker. During the 1930s, Haslam swam on multiple university swim teams and won two medals at the 1934 British Empire Games. After completing her studies, Haslam held executive positions for the YWCA in Canada and Trinidad from the mid 1930s to early 1950s. From 1953 to 1978, Haslam was executive director of the Elizabeth Fry Society's Toronto branch. Haslam was inducted into the Canadian Olympic Hall of Fame in 1977 and named an Officer of the Order of Canada in 1978.

== Early life and education ==
On 24 May 1913, Haslam was born in Dharmsala, India. During her childhood, Haslam lived in Toronto, Ontario and Saskatoon, Saskatchewan. For her post-secondary education, Haslam first received a Bachelor of Science from the University of Saskatchewan in 1934 and a social work diploma from the University of Toronto in 1936. She later graduated from Trinity College, Toronto with a Doctor of Sacred Literature in 1980.

== Career ==
While completing her studies, Haslam began entering swimming events in 1930. In the 1930s, Haslam set two records for Canada in the breaststroke and won multiple university swimming championships. At the trials for the 1934 British Empire Games, Haslam briefly held the world record for the 100 yards breaststroke before her time was broken at the event. As a competitor at that year's British Empire Games, Haslam won a silver medal at the 200 yards breaststroke and gold in the 3×100 yards medley relay.

As part of her post-secondary education in Toronto, Haslam worked at the Grandview Training School for Girls before joining the YWCA upon graduation. Haslam started out as a campus director for the organization's Montreal branch from 1936 to 1941. She later held executive director positions in Cornwall, Ontario and Trinidad during the 1940s. Haslam ended her tenure with the YWCA after becoming their personnel director from 1948 to 1953. Apart from the YWCA, Haslam was executive director of the Elizabeth Fry Society in Toronto from 1953 to 1978.

== Awards and honours ==
Haslam was inducted into the University of Saskatchewan's Hall of Fame in 1984 and the University of Toronto's Hall of Fame in 2015. Outside of universities, Haslam became a member of the Saskatchewan Sports Hall of Fame in 1975 and the Canadian Olympic Hall of Fame in 1977. For awards, Haslam was named an Officer of the Order of Canada in 1978.

== Death ==
On August 23, 1991, Haslam died in Toronto, Ontario.
