= Ken Street =

British swimmer

Personal information
- Nationality: British (Welsh)
- Born: January 1911 Penarth, Wales
- Died: 4 February 1942 Singosari, Malang, Indonesia

Sport
- Sport: Swimming, Water polo, Rugby union
- Event: Freestyle
- Club: Penarth SC

Ralph Kenwyn Street (January 1911 – 4 February 1942) was a Welsh swimmer who specialised in freestyle and competed at the Commonwealth Games. He was also a prominent Rugby union and Water polo player.

== Biography ==
Street was born in Penarth, Wales and was a member of the Penarth Swimming Club. He was captain of the Penarth water polo team and represented Wales at water polo at international level.

Jones lowered his own 100 yards freestyle Welsh record in June 1932, recording 58.75 sec.

In 1933, Street retained the 100 yards freestyle title for the fourth consecutive year. In June 1934, Street was selected for preliminary trials for the 1934 British Empire Games team

He represented the Welsh team at the 1934 British Empire Games in London, where he competed in the 100 yards freestyle and helped Wales finish fourth in the 4 × 200 yards freestyle relay, with Arthur Davies, Selwyn Capon and Ronald Evans.

He continued to represent Wales at water polo and played rugby for Cardiff Athletic Club but his career was ended by World War II.

During the war, Street served with the 77th Heavy Anti-Aircraft Regiment, and in 1942 was killed in a train crash carrying troops from Java to Surabaya.
