= Herbert Reeves =

Male athlete

Personal information
- Nationality: British (English)

Sport
- Sport: Athletics
- Event(s): hammer, shot put, discus
- Club: Manchester City Police AC

Herbert Reeves was a male athlete who competed for England.

== Biography ==
Reeves was an all-round throwing athlete, competing in the hammer throw, shot put and discus throw. He was a member of the Manchester City Police Athletic Club.

He represented England at the 1934 British Empire Games in London, where he competed in the hammer throw and shot put events.

He was still competing shortly before the outbreak of World War II, retaining his North of England weight (shot put) title in June 1939.
