= England at the 1934 British Empire Games =

- CG code: ENG
- CGA: Commonwealth Games England

in London, England
- Medals Ranked 1st: Gold 29 Silver 20 Bronze 24 Total 73

British Empire Games appearances
- 1930; 1934; 1938; 1950; 1954; 1958; 1962; 1966; 1970; 1974; 1978; 1982; 1986; 1990; 1994; 1998; 2002; 2006; 2010; 2014; 2018; 2022; 2026; 2030

England competed at the 1934 British Empire Games (abbreviated ENG) was the second appearance of the country at the Commonwealth Games. The Games were held in London, England, from 4 August to 11 August 1934.

England topped the medal table with 29 gold medals, 20 silver medals and 24 bronze medals.

== Medal table (top three) ==
Rank	Nation	Gold	Silver	Bronze	Total
1	England	29	20	24	73
2	Canada	17	25	9	51
3	Australia	8	4	2	14
Totals (3 entries)		54	49	35	138

== Team ==
The athletes that competed are listed below.

=== Athletics ===
==== (Men) ====
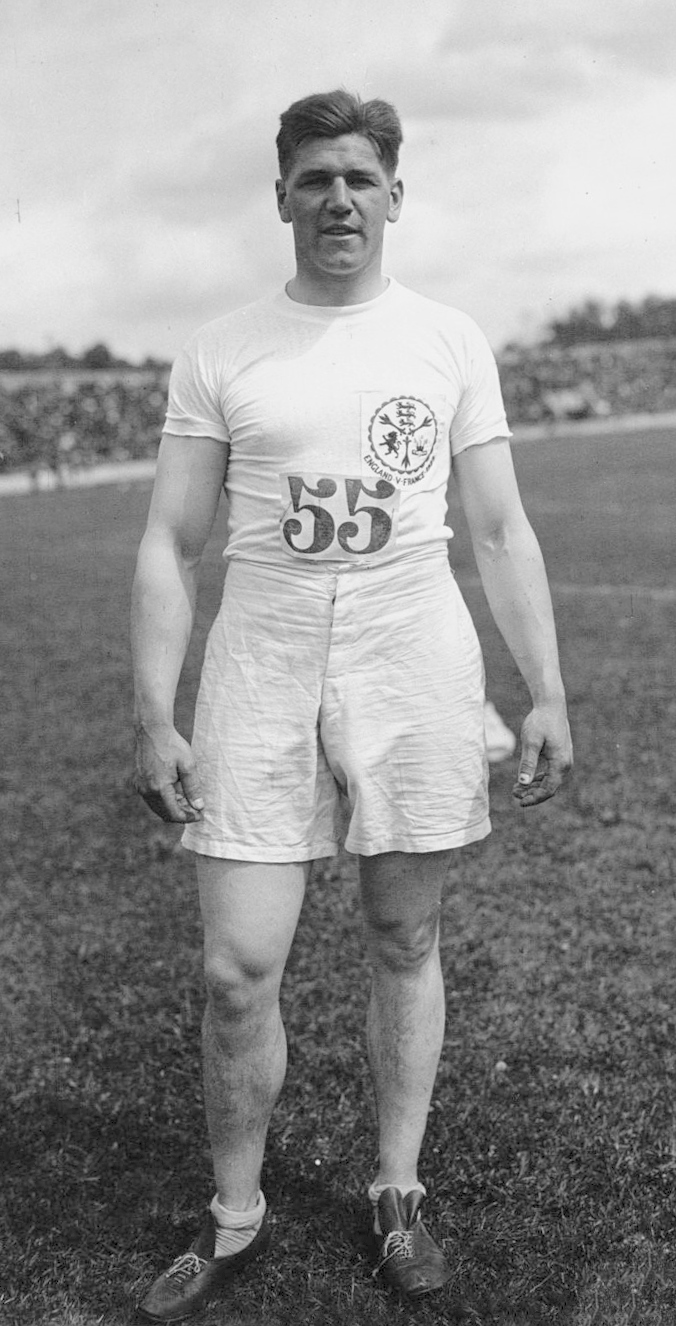
Malcolm Nokes won gold in the hammer throw again

Name	Event	Club	Medal
Cyril Allen	3 miles	Highgate Harriers	Silver medal
George Bailey	2 mile steeplechase	Salford Harriers	Bronze medal
Wally Beavers	3 miles	York Harriers	Gold medal
Douglas Bell	discus, hammer	Achilles Club	Silver medal
Geoffrey Blake	440 yards, 4 × 440	London University	Gold medal
Charles Bowen	javelin	Lancashire Fusiliers	none
Edward Bradbrooke	high jump	Achilles Club	none
Ralph Kilner Brown	440y hurdles	Achilles Club	Bronze medal
Alec Burns	3 miles	Elswick Harriers	Bronze medal
Leslie Butler	long Jump, triple jump	Blackheath Harriers	none
Thomas Campbell	2 mile steeplechase	Salford Harriers	none
Jack A. Cooper	880 yards	C.A.V. Harriers	none
Jerry Cornes	1 Mile	Achilles Club	Bronze medal
Horace Craske	1 Mile	South London Harriers	none
Robert Crombie	long Jump	Mitcham AC	none
Everard Davis	100 yards, 4 × 110	Achilles Club	Gold medal
Norman Drake	hammer	Sutton-in-Ashfield Harriers	none
Sandy Duncan	long Jump	Achilles Club	none
John Duus	javelin	Manchester AC	none
Tom Evenson	2 mile steeplechase	Salford Harriers	Silver medal
Don Finlay	120 yards hurdles	Surrey AC	Gold medal
Arthur Furze	6 miles	Watford Harriers	Bronze medal
John Gabriel	120 yards hurdles	London AC	none
Arthur Gray	high jump, triple jump	Polytechnic Harriers	none
Michael Gutteridge	880 yards	Army	none
Roland Harper	120 yards hurdles	Achilles Club	none
Joseph Heath	javelin	Birchfield Harriers	none
John Higginson	Leyland Motors AC	triple jump	none
Maurice Hintze	220 yards	Polytechnic Harriers	none
Jack Holden	3 miles, 6 miles	Tipton Harriers	none
Robert Howland	shot put	Achilles Club	Silver medal
Alfred Kinally	pole vault	Army	none
William Land	discus, high jump	Army	none
Reg Nicholls	marathon	Reading AC	none
Malcolm Nokes	hammer	Achilles Club	Gold medal
Bert Norris	marathon	Polytechnic Harriers	none
George Pallett	long Jump	Herne Hill Harriers	none
Arthur Penny	6 miles	Belgrave Harriers	Gold medal
Frank Phillipson	pole vault	Salford Harriers	none
Ashleigh Pilbrow	120, 440 yards hurdles	Achilles Club	Bronze medal
John Potts	6 miles	Salford Harriers	none
Jack Powell	880 yards	London AC	none
Kenneth Pridie	discus, shot put	London AC	Bronze medal
Godfrey Rampling	440 yards, 4 × 440	Milocarian AC	,
Walter Rangeley	100, 220 yards, 4 × 110	Salford AC	,
Denis Rathbone	220 yards, 4 × 440	Achilles Club	Gold medal
Aubrey Reeve	1 Mile	Polytechnic Harriers	none
Herbert Reeves	hammer, shot put	Manchester City Police AC	none
Bill Roberts	440 yards	Salford AC	Silver medal
George Saunders	100 yards, 4 × 110	Polytechnic Harriers	Gold medal
Stanley Scarsbrook	2 mile steeplechase	Surrey AC	Gold medal
John Stone	440y hurdles	South London Harriers	none
Crew Stoneley	440 yards, 4 × 440	Army	,
Arthur Sweeney	100, 220 yards, 4 × 110	Milocarian AC	,,
F. Turner	triple jump	Sparkhill Harriers	none
Jack Walker	pole vault	Achilles Club	none
Anthony Watson	shot put	Army	none
Lawrence Weatherill	marathon	South London Harriers	none
Dick Webster	pole vault	London AC	none
Stanley West	high jump	Polytechnic Harriers	none
Clifford Whitehead	880 yards	Salford Harriers	none
Stanley Wilson	javelin	Birchfield Harriers	none
Harry Wood	marathon	Makerfield Harriers	none
Sydney Wooderson	1 Mile	Blackheath Harriers	Silver medal

==== (Women) ====
Name	Event	Club	Medal
Phyllis Bartholomew	long jump	Reading AC	Gold medal
Dorothy Butterfield	880 yards	Middlesex Ladies AC	Bronze medal
Lillian Chalmers	100 yards	Portsmouth Atalanta AC	Bronze medal
Margaret Cox	javelin	Birchfield Harriers	Bronze medal
Louise Fawcett	javelin	London Olympiades AC	none
Constance Furneaux	880 yards	Mitcham AC	none
Phyllis Goad	80 metres hurdles	Portsmouth Atalanta AC	none
Elsie Green	80 metres hurdles	North London Harriers	Bronze medal
Edith Halstead	javelin	Bury & Radcliffe AC	Silver medal
Nellie Halstead	220 yards, 440, 660 relay	Bury & Radcliffe AC	,,
Elsie Harris	high jump	London Olympiades AC	none
Eileen Hiscock	100, 220 yards, 440, 660 relay	London Olympiades AC	,,,
Ethel Johnson	100, 220 yards, 660 relay	Bolton Harriers	Silver medal
Ida Jones	880 yards	Liverpool University AC	Silver medal
Gladys Lunn	880 yards, javelin	Birchfield Harriers	,
Elsie Maguire	100 yards, 440 relay	London Olympiades AC	Gold medal
Mary Milne	high jump	Mitcham AC	none
Marjorie O'Kell	high jump	Middlesex Ladies AC	none
Doris Razzell	long jump	North London Harriers	none
Hilda Thorogood	high jump	London Olympiades AC	none
Kathleen Tiffen	80 metres hurdles	Mitcham AC	none
Ivy Walker	220 yards, 660 relay	Cambridge Harriers	Silver medal
Violet Webb	80 metres hurdles, long jump	Ladies Polytechnic Club	Bronze medal

=== Boxing ===
Name	Weight	Club	Medal
George Brennan	Light heavyweight	Nottingham Police ABC	Gold medal
Pat Floyd	Heavyweight	Battersea BC	Gold medal
Dave McCleave	Welterweight	Lynn AC	Gold medal
Harry Moy	Lightweight	Lynn AC	Bronze medal
Pat Palmer	Flyweight	Battersea & Shexgar ABC	Gold medal
Eddie Ryan	Bantamweight	Lynn AC	Gold medal
Alf Shawyer	Middleweight	Old Goldsmiths BC	Gold medal
Jack Treadaway	Featherweight	Battersea & Shexgar ABC	none

=== Cycling ===
Name	Event	Club	Medal
William Harvell	1000y sprint, 10 mile scratch	Poole Wheelers	Bronze medal
Ernest Higgins	1000y sprint	Manchester Wheelers	Gold medal
Jack Sibbit	10 mile scratch	Manchester Wheelers	none

=== Diving ===
==== (Men) ====
Name	Event	Club	Medal
Peter Beveridge	3 m springboard	Highgate DC	none
Louis Marchant	10 m platform	Highgate DC	Bronze medal
Tommy Mather	10 m platform	Highgate DC	Gold medal
John Brisco Ray	3 m springboard	Highgate DC	Gold medal
Doug Tomalin	3 m springboard, 10 m platform	Highgate DC	,

==== (Women) ====
Name	Event	Club	Medal
Cecily Cousens	10 m platform	Coates Amateur SC, Swindon	Bronze medal
Katinka Larsen	3 m springboard	Finchley	none
Dot Macready	10 m platform	Jersey	Gold medal

=== Lawn bowls ===
Name	Event	Club	Medal
Fred Biggin	Rinks/Fours	Temple BC	Gold medal
Ernie Gudgeon	Rinks/Fours	Preston	Gold medal
Tommy Hills	Pairs	Eltham BC	Gold medal
James McKinlay	Singles	Paddington BC	none
Robert Slater	Rinks/Fours	Callenders BC	Gold medal
Percy Tomlinson	Rinks/Fours	Margate BC	Gold medal
George Wright	Pairs	Southern Railway BC, Eastleigh	Gold medal

=== Swimming ===
==== (Men) ====
Name	Event	Club	Medal
John Besford	100 yd backstroke, 3×110 medley	South Manchester	,
Goldup Davies	200 yd breaststroke	Laurie SC	none
Frederick Dove	100 yd freestyle	RTW Monson SC	none
Mostyn Ffrench-Williams	100 yd freestyle, 4×200, 3×110 medley	Penguin SC	,
Bob Leivers	440 yd freestyle, 4×200	Longton ASA	Silver medal
Kenneth Scott	100 yd backstroke	Hampstead Priory SC	none
Arthur Summers	3×110 medley	Penguin SC	Bronze medal
Reginald Sutton	100 yd freestyle, 4×200	Plaistow SC	Silver medal
Norman Wainwright	440y /1500y freestyle, 4×200	Hanley SC	,,

==== (Women) ====
Name	Event	Club	Medal
Olive Bartle	4×100	Croydon Ladies SC	Bronze medal
Margaret Gomm	200 yd breaststroke	Hammersmith Ladies SC	none
Audrey Hancock	100 yd backstroke	Dudley Ladies SC	none
Phyllis Harding	100 yd backstroke, 3×110 medley	Croydon Ladies SC	,
Margery Hinton	440y free, 200y breaststroke, 4×100	South Manchester	,
Edna Hughes	100 yd freestyle, 4×100, 3×110 medley	Walsall	,
Vera Kingston	200 yd breaststroke, 3×110 medley	United Ladies' SC, Leicester	Silver medal
Gladys Morcom	440 yd freestyle	Dudley Ladies SC	none
Beatrice Wolstenholme	440 yd freestyle, 4×100	Moss Side SC, Manchester	Bronze medal

=== Wrestling ===
Name	Weight	Club	Medal
Stanley Bissell	Middleweight	Metropolitan Police A.A.	Silver medal
William Fox	Welterweight	Manchester Y.M.C.A.	Silver medal
Joe Nelson	Featherweight	Bolton United Harriers & AC	Silver medal
G.E. North	Lightweight	Manchester Y.M.C.A.	Silver medal
Joseph Reid	Bantamweight	Leigh H. & A.C.	Bronze medal
Bernard Rowe	Light heavyweight	Nottingham Physical Culture School	Silver medal
Horace Taylor	Heavyweight	Bradford Premier A.C.	none
