= Robert Hooper (swimmer) =

Canadian swimmer (1917–2001)

Personal information
- Full name: Robert Percy Hooper
- National team: Canada
- Born: September 11, 1917 Vancouver, British Columbia
- Died: September 2, 2001 (aged 83) Phoenix, Arizona, US

Sport
- Sport: Swimming
- Strokes: Freestyle
Medal record
Men's swimming
Representing Canada
British Empire Games
Gold medal – first place	1934 London	4×200 yd freestyle
Silver medal – second place	1938 Sydney	4×220 yd freestyle

Robert Percy Hooper (September 11, 1917 – September 2, 2001) was a Canadian freestyle swimmer who competed in the 1936 Summer Olympics in Berlin.

In 1936 he was a member of the Canadian team which finished seventh in the 4x200-metre freestyle relay. In the 400-metre freestyle, as well as in the 1500-metre freestyle, he was eliminated in the first round. At the 1934 Empire Games he was a member of the Canadian team which won the gold medal in the 4×200-yard freestyle event. Four years later at the Empire Games in Sydney he won the silver medal with the Canadian team in the 4×220-yard freestyle competition.

== See also ==
- List of Commonwealth Games medallists in swimming (men)
