= George Larson =

Canadian swimmer

Personal information
- Full name: George Frederick Larson
- Nickname: "Irish Tom Collins"
- National team: Canada
- Born: October 28, 1914 Hamilton, Ontario
- Died: September 20, 2008 (aged 93) Hamilton, Ontario

Sport
- Sport: Swimming
- Strokes: Freestyle
Medal record
Men's swimming
Representing Canada
British Empire Games
Gold medal – first place	1934 London	4×200 yd freestyle
Silver medal – second place	1934 London	100 yd freestyle

George Frederick Larson (June 10, 1912 – September 20, 2008) was a Canadian freestyle swimmer who competed in the 1932 Summer Olympics and 1936 Summer Olympics.

At the 1932 Olympics in Los Angeles, he was a member of the Canadian team that finished fourth in the men's 4x200-metre freestyle relay. In the 400-metre freestyle, he was eliminated in the first round.

Four years later at the 1936 Olympics in Berlin, he was eliminated in the first round of the 100-metre freestyle contest.

At the 1934 British Empire Games, he was a member of the Canadian team which won the gold medal in the 4×200-yard freestyle relay. He also won a silver medal in the 100-yard freestyle competition and finished fourth in the 440-yard freestyle, and sixth in the 1500-yard freestyle.

After his swimming career concluded, Larson played Canadian football for the Hamilton Tigers and Hamilton Wildcats, the predecessors of the modern-era Hamilton Tiger-Cats of the CFL. While later working as a police officer, he earned extra income as a professional wrestler under the pseudonym "Irish Tom Collins" for fifteen years.

Larson was born in Hamilton, Ontario; he died in Hamilton in 2008, aged 96.

== See also ==
- List of Commonwealth Games medallists in swimming (men)
