= Bill Puddy =

Canadian swimmer (1916–1999)

Personal information
- Full name: Albert William Puddy
- Nickname: "Bill"
- National team: Canada
- Born: December 19, 1916 Toronto, Ontario, Canada
- Died: June 23, 1999 (aged 82) Toronto, Ontario, Canada

Sport
- Sport: Swimming
- Strokes: Breaststroke
Medal record
Men's swimming
Representing Canada
British Empire Games
| Gold medal – first place | 1934 London | 3×110 yd medley |
| Bronze medal – third place | 1934 London | 200 yd breaststroke |

Albert William Puddy (December 19, 1916 – June 23, 1999) was a competition swimmer who represented Canada in international swimming events during the 1930s. At the 1934 British Empire Games in London, he won a gold medal as a member of the first-place Canadian team in the 3×110-yard medley relay, and a bronze medal in the 200-yard breaststroke. He also swam in the 200-metre breaststroke at the 1936 Summer Olympics in Berlin, Germany, but did not advance beyond the first round.

== See also ==
- List of Commonwealth Games medallists in swimming (men)
