= Willie Francis (swimmer) =

British swimmer (1911–1997)

Personal information
- Nationality: British (Scottish)
- Born: 23 February 1911 Dunfermline, Scotland
- Died: April 1997 (aged 86) Kidderminster, England

Sport
- Sport: Swimming
- Strokes: Backstroke
- Club: Renfrew District ASC
Medal record
Men's swimming
Representing Scotland
British Empire Games
Gold medal – first place	1934 London	100 yd backstroke
Silver medal – second place	1930 Hamilton	100 yd backstroke
Silver medal – second place	1934 London	3×110 yd medley

William Francis (23 February 1911 – April 1997) was a Scottish competitive swimmer and backstroke specialist who represented Great Britain in the Olympics and competed for Scotland in the British Empire Games.

== Biography ==
Francis was born in Dunfermline.

At the 1928 Summer Olympics in Amsterdam, he was eliminated in the semi-finals of the men's 100-metre backstroke event. Four years later at the 1932 Summer Olympics in Los Angeles, he was eliminated in the first round of the men's 100-metre backstroke.

At the 1930 British Empire Games he won the silver medal in the 100-yard backstroke contest. Four years later at the Empire Games in Sydney he won the gold medal in the 100-yard backstroke. He was also a member of the Scottish team which won the silver medal in the 3×110-yard medley relay. At the time of the Games he was living at 20 Glebe Crescent in Renfrew and was a reporter by profession.

He also participated in the 1938 Empire Games in Sydney, Australia, but was unplaced in the 110-yard backstroke contest.

At the time of the Games he was a newspaper reporter and lived at 32 Glebe Street, Renfrew.

== See also ==
- List of Commonwealth Games medallists in swimming (men)
