= Bob Pirie =

Canadian swimmer

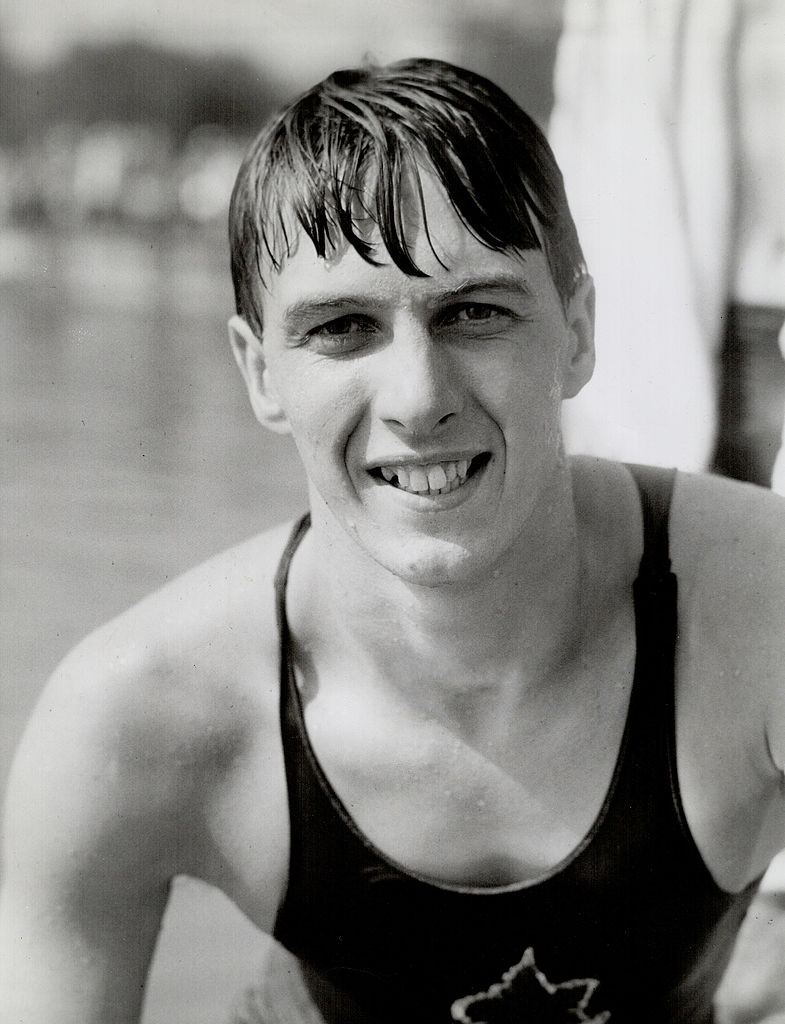

Personal information
- Full name: Robert Charles Pirie
- Nickname: "Bob"
- National team: Canada
- Born: April 30, 1916 Toronto, Ontario, Canada
- Died: January 22, 1984 (aged 67) Los Angeles, California, United States

Sport
- Sport: Swimming
- Strokes: Freestyle
Medal record
Representing Canada
British Empire Games
Gold medal – first place	1934 London	4×200 yd freestyle
Gold medal – first place	1938 Sydney	110 yd freestyle
Gold medal – first place	1938 Sydney	440 yd freestyle
Silver medal – second place	1934 London	1500 yd freestyle
Silver medal – second place	1938 Sydney	1650 yd freestyle
Silver medal – second place	1938 Sydney	4×220 yd freestyle
Silver medal – second place	1938 Sydney	3×110 yd medley
Bronze medal – third place	1934 London	440 yd freestyle

Robert Charles Pirie (April 30, 1916 – January 22, 1984) was a Canadian freestyle swimmer who competed internationally in the 1930s.

== Background ==
Pirie was unanimously selected as the Lou Marsh Trophy winner for 1939, recognizing Canada's top athlete. That year, in Hawaii, he broke the 220-yard world record long held by Johnny Weissmuller and finished third in the U.S. national championships in the 110-yard and 220-yard freestyle races, with Japanese swimmers taking the top two spots in both races. At the time, he held every Canadian freestyle swimming record from 100 metres to two miles.

Earlier, Pirie won silver and bronze in freestyle events at the 1934 British Empire Games. His sister, Irene Pirie, also won individual silver and bronze freestyle medals at the same games. Four years later, at the 1938 British Empire Games, Pirie won gold in the 110-yard freestyle and the 440-yard freestyle events, and silver in the 1650-yard freestyle race. Pirie attended and participated in the 1936 Summer Olympics. In the 400-metre freestyle and 1500-metre freestyle, he was eliminated in the semi-finals. He was also a member of the Canadian relay team which finished seventh in the 4×200-metre freestyle relay.

Pirie was inducted into the Canadian Olympic Hall of Fame in 1975. The Bob Pirie Trophy is presented each year by Swim Ontario to the top male swimmer in Ontario as selected by the Ontario Swimming Coaches' Association. The female swimmer of the year receives the Irene Pirie Trophy. Pirie was posthumously inducted into the Canada's Sports Hall of Fame in 2015.

== See also ==
- List of Commonwealth Games medallists in swimming (men)
