= Athletics at the 1936 Summer Olympics – Men's decathlon =

Men's decathlon at the Games of the XI Olympiad
- Dates: August 7 & August 8, 1936

Medalists
1st place, gold medalist(s)		Glenn Morris	United States
2nd place, silver medalist(s)		Bob Clark	United States
3rd place, bronze medalist(s)		Jack Parker	United States

The men's decathlon event at the 1936 Summer Olympics took place between August 7 & August 8.

== Results ==
=== 100 metres ===
Rank	Athlete	Country	Time	Points	Adjusted Points	Notes
1	Bob Clark	United States	10.9	872	830	OB
2	Glenn Morris	United States	11.1	814	786	
3	Armin Guhl	Switzerland	11.3	760	744	
4	Émile Binet	Belgium	11.4	735	723	
4	Jack Parker	United States	11.4	735	723	
4	Akilles Järvinen	Finland	11.4	735	723	
7	Martti Tolamo	Finland	11.5	710	703	
7	Lyuben Doychev	Bulgaria	11.5	710	703	
7	Erwin Huber	Germany	11.5	710	703	
10	Zoltán Csányi	Hungary	11.6	686	683	
10	Olle Bexell	Sweden	11.6	686	683	
10	Reindert Brasser	Netherlands	11.6	686	683	
10	Jerzy Pławczyk	Poland	11.6	686	683	
10	Helmut Bonnet	Germany	11.6	686	683	
10	Leif Dahlgren	Sweden	11.6	686	683	
10	Josef Klein	Czechoslovakia	11.6	686	683	
17	Franz Sterzl	Austria	11.7	662	663	
18	Willy Bührer	Switzerland	11.8	640	643	
19	Fritz Dällenbach	Switzerland	11.9	618	624	
19	Jānis Dimza	Latvia	11.9	618	624	
21	Erwin Reimer	Chile	12.0	597	605	
22	Edvard Natvig	Norway	12.1	576	586	
22	Aulis Reinikka	Finland	12.1	576	586	
22	Péter Bácsalmási	Hungary	12.1	576	586	
25	Chang Singchow	Republic of China	12.2	556	567	
25	Osvaldo Wenzel	Chile	12.2	556	567	
27	Maurice Boulanger	Belgium	12.4	517	531	
28	Karl Vilmundarson	Iceland	12.6	481	495	

=== Long jump ===
Rank	Athlete	Country	Round one	Round two	Round three	Distance	Points	Adjusted Points	Notes
1	Bob Clark	United States	7.62	foul	7.36	7.62	977	965	OB
2	Jack Parker	United States	7.18	7.35	7.34	7.35	899	898	
3	Jerzy Pławczyk	Poland	6.98	6.94	7.12	7.12	836	842	
4	Armin Guhl	Switzerland	7.04	6.85	6.83	7.04	815	823	
5	Glenn Morris	United States	6.63	6.83	6.97	6.97	796	807	
6	Erwin Huber	Germany	6.76	6.89	6.78	6.89	775	788	
7	Martti Tolamo	Finland	foul	6.81	6.84	6.84	762	776	
8	Péter Bácsalmási	Hungary	6.66	6.40	6.78	6.78	746	762	
9	Akilles Järvinen	Finland	6.69	foul	6.52	6.69	723	741	
9	Reindert Brasser	Netherlands	5.74	6.69	6.62	6.69	723	741	
11	Olle Bexell	Sweden	6.42	6.41	6.68	6.68	721	739	
12	Helmut Bonnet	Germany	6.36	6.57	6.66	6.66	716	734	
13	Leif Dahlgren	Sweden	6.58	6.65	6.50	6.65	713	732	
14	Edvard Natvig	Norway	6.50	6.55	6.39	6.55	688	709	
14	Émile Binet	Belgium	6.32	foul	6.55	6.55	688	709	
16	Franz Sterzl	Austria	6.28	6.52	6.22	6.52	681	702	
17	Willy Bührer	Switzerland	6.18	6.03	6.48	6.48	671	693	
18	Zoltán Csányi	Hungary	6.42	6.24	6.39	6.42	656	679	
19	Fritz Dällenbach	Switzerland	6.29	6.06	6.36	6.36	641	666	
19	Jānis Dimza	Latvia	6.21	6.30	6.36	6.36	641	666	
21	Lyuben Doychev	Bulgaria	6.01	6.35	6.05	6.35	639	644	
22	Aulis Reinikka	Finland	6.20	6.20	6.32	6.32	632	657	
23	Chang Singchow	Republic of China	6.28	foul	foul	6.28	622	648	
24	Osvaldo Wenzel	Chile	6.08	6.25	5.99	6.25	615	641	
25	Josef Klein	Czechoslovakia	6.22	6.18	6.03	6.22	608	635	
26	Erwin Reimer	Chile	5.92	5.92	5.91	5.92	538	569	
27	Maurice Boulanger	Belgium	5.57	5.85	5.59	5.85	522	554	
28	Karl Vilmundarson	Iceland	5.62	foul	foul	5.62	472	5.06	

=== Shot put ===
Rank	Athlete	Country	Round one	Round two	Round three	Distance	Points	Adjusted Points	Notes
1	Glenn Morris	United States	13.59	14.10	13.35	14.10	826	734	
2	Zoltán Csányi	Hungary	14.00	13.89	13.79	14.00	816	728	
3	Jānis Dimza	Latvia	13.66	13.47	12.60	13.66	781	708	
4	Olle Bexell	Sweden	13.54	13.22	13.54	13.54	769	700	
5	Akilles Järvinen	Finland	13.33	12.92	13.53	13.53	768	700	
6	Jack Parker	United States	13.44	13.52	13.09	13.52	767	699	
7	Helmut Bonnet	Germany	13.45	13.50	13.45	13.50	765	698	
8	Reindert Brasser	Netherlands	13.40	13.49	12.52	13.49	764	697	
9	Willy Bührer	Switzerland	12.94	12.76	13.25	13.25	740	682	
10	Edvard Natvig	Norway	foul	12.89	12.37	12.89	705	661	
11	Aulis Reinikka	Finland	11.61	12.74	12.22	12.74	690	651	
12	Erwin Huber	Germany	12.43	12.70	12.50	12.70	687	649	
13	Martti Tolamo	Finland	12.33	12.68	12.57	12.68	685	648	
13	Bob Clark	United States	12.68	12.67	12.44	12.68	685	648	
15	Leif Dahlgren	Sweden	12.44	12.63	12.48	12.63	680	645	
16	Osvaldo Wenzel	Chile	12.43	12.37	12.02	12.43	661	633	
17	Armin Guhl	Switzerland	12.30	11.72	12.29	12.30	649	625	
18	Lyuben Doychev	Bulgaria	11.94	11.89	12.26	12.26	645	622	
19	Jerzy Pławczyk	Poland	11.93	11.48	11.94	11.94	615	603	
20	Péter Bácsalmási	Hungary	11.58	11.77	foul	11.77	600	592	
21	Fritz Dällenbach	Switzerland	11.59	11.12	11.24	11.59	584	582	
22	Josef Klein	Czechoslovakia	10.99	10.91	10.77	10.99	530	545	
23	Franz Sterzl	Austria	10.85	10.98	10.60	10.98	530	545	
24	Maurice Boulanger	Belgium	foul	9.60	9.92	9.92	615	641	
25	Émile Binet	Belgium	6.98	8.26	foul	8.26	311	382	

=== High jump ===
Rank	Athlete	Country	Height	Points	Adjusted Points	Notes
1	Reindert Brasser	Netherlands	1.90	909	714	
2	Edvard Natvig	Norway	1.85	846	670	
2	Glenn Morris	United States	1.85	846	670	
2	Jerzy Pławczyk	Poland	1.85	846	670	
5	Armin Guhl	Switzerland	1.80	786	627	
5	Jack Parker	United States	1.80	786	627	
5	Bob Clark	United States	1.80	786	627	
8	Akilles Järvinen	Finland	1.75	727	585	
8	Franz Sterzl	Austria	1.75	727	585	
8	Helmut Bonnet	Germany	1.75	727	585	
8	Leif Dahlgren	Sweden	1.75	727	585	
8	Martti Tolamo	Finland	1.75	727	585	
8	Olle Bexell	Sweden	1.75	727	585	
8	Péter Bácsalmási	Hungary	1.75	727	585	
8	Willy Bührer	Switzerland	1.75	727	585	
16	Aulis Reinikka	Finland	1.70	671	544	
16	Erwin Huber	Germany	1.70	671	544	
16	Fritz Dällenbach	Switzerland	1.70	671	544	
16	Jānis Dimza	Latvia	1.70	671	544	
16	Lyuben Doychev	Bulgaria	1.70	671	544	
21	Osvaldo Wenzel	Chile	1.65	616	504	
21	Émile Binet	Belgium	1.65	616	504	
23	Maurice Boulanger	Belgium	1.60	563	464	
23	Zoltán Csányi	Hungary	1.60	563	464	
25	Josef Klein	Czechoslovakia	1.55	512	426	

=== 400 metres ===
Rank	Athlete	Country	Time	Points	Adjusted Points	Notes
1	Glenn Morris	United States	49.4	910	836	
2	Bob Clark	United States	50.0	874	808	
3	Akilles Järvinen	Finland	50.7	834	776	
4	Martti Tolamo	Finland	51.2	807	754	
4	Leif Dahlgren	Sweden	51.2	807	754	
6	Reindert Brasser	Netherlands	51.5	791	741	
7	Émile Binet	Belgium	52.2	755	710	
8	Armin Guhl	Switzerland	52.3	750	706	
8	Erwin Huber	Germany	52.3	750	706	
10	Aulis Reinikka	Finland	52.5	740	697	
11	Péter Bácsalmási	Hungary	53.1	711	671	
12	Jack Parker	United States	53.3	701	663	
12	Franz Sterzl	Austria	53.3	701	663	
12	Josef Klein	Czechoslovakia	53.3	701	663	
15	Fritz Dällenbach	Switzerland	53.6	687	650	
16	Helmut Bonnet	Germany	53.7	683	646	
17	Jerzy Pławczyk	Poland	54.0	669	634	
17	Zoltán Csányi	Hungary	54.0	669	634	
19	Lyuben Doychev	Bulgaria	54.1	665	630	
20	Willy Bührer	Switzerland	54.5	647	613	
21	Olle Bexell	Sweden	54.9	630	597	
22	Maurice Boulanger	Belgium	55.1	622	589	
23	Osvaldo Wenzel	Chile	55.3	614	581	
24	Edvard Natvig	Norway	56.3	574	542	

=== 110 metre hurdles ===
Rank	Athlete	Country	Time	Points	Adjusted Points	Notes
1	Glenn Morris	United States	14.9	946	833	OB
2	Jack Parker	United States	15.0	929	821	
3	Armin Guhl	Switzerland	15.6	833	751	
4	Bob Clark	United States	15.7	818	740	
5	Erwin Huber	Germany	15.8	804	728	
6	Émile Binet	Belgium	16.0	776	706	
6	Olle Bexell	Sweden	16.0	776	706	
6	Leif Dahlgren	Sweden	16.0	776	706	
9	Edvard Natvig	Norway	16.1	762	695	
10	Reindert Brasser	Netherlands	16.2	749	684	
10	Helmut Bonnet	Germany	16.2	749	684	
12	Fritz Dällenbach	Switzerland	16.3	736	673	
12	Lyuben Doychev	Bulgaria	16.3	736	673	
14	Jerzy Pławczyk	Poland	16.4	723	662	
15	Aulis Reinikka	Finland	16.5	710	652	
15	Franz Sterzl	Austria	16.5	710	652	
17	Martti Tolamo	Finland	16.6	698	641	
17	Willy Bührer	Switzerland	16.6	698	641	
19	Zoltán Csányi	Hungary	17.0	651	599	
20	Josef Klein	Czechoslovakia	17.3	618	569	
21	Osvaldo Wenzel	Chile	18.2	529	483	
22	Péter Bácsalmási	Hungary	18.4	511	464	
23	Maurice Boulanger	Belgium	19.2	444	395	

=== Discus throw ===
Rank	Athlete	Country	Distance	Points	Adjusted Points	Notes
1	Glenn Morris	United States	43.02	803		
2	Armin Guhl	Switzerland	40.97	740		
3	Péter Bácsalmási	Hungary	39.64	701		
4	Edvard Natvig	Norway	39.60	699		
5	Reindert Brasser	Netherlands	39.45	695		
6	Bob Clark	United States	39.39	693		
7	Helmut Bonnet	Germany	39.16	686		
8	Jack Parker	United States	39.11	685		
9	Olle Bexell	Sweden	38.83	677		
10	Aulis Reinikka	Finland	38.61	670		
11	Jerzy Pławczyk	Poland	38.30	662		
12	Lyuben Doychev	Bulgaria	38.25	660		
13	Leif Dahlgren	Sweden	38.06	655		
14	Osvaldo Wenzel	Chile	37.11	628		
15	Willy Bührer	Switzerland	36.43	609		
16	Josef Klein	Czechoslovakia	35.88	593		
17	Zoltán Csányi	Hungary	35.86	5.93		
18	Erwin Huber	Germany	35.46	582		
19	Franz Sterzl	Austria	35.33	578		
20	Martti Tolamo	Finland	34.36	552		
21	Fritz Dällenbach	Switzerland	33.18	520		
22	Émile Binet	Belgium	26.87	363		
23	Maurice Boulanger	Belgium	25.20	324		

=== Pole vault ===
Rank	Athlete	Country	Height	Points	Adjusted Points	Notes
1=	Aulis Reinikka	Finland	3.90	862	590	
1=	Péter Bácsalmási	Hungary	3.90	862	590	
3	Erwin Huber	Germany	3.80	818	562	
4=	Edvard Natvig	Norway	3.70	775	535	
4=	Bob Clark	United States	3.70	775	535	
4=	Olle Bexell	Sweden	3.70	775	535	
4=	Jerzy Pławczyk	Poland	3.70	775	535	
4=	Lyuben Doychev	Bulgaria	3.70	775	535	
4=	Zoltán Csányi	Hungary	3.70	775	535	
10=	Helmut Bonnet	Germany	3.60	733	509	
10=	Fritz Dällenbach	Switzerland	3.60	733	509	
12=	Jack Parker	United States	3.50	692	482	
12=	Glenn Morris	United States	3.50	692	482	
14	Reindert Brasser	Netherlands	3.40	652	457	
15=	Armin Guhl	United States	3.30	613	431	
15=	Leif Dahlgren	Sweden	3.30	613	431	
15=	Maurice Boulanger	Belgium	3.30	613	431	
15=	Willy Bührer	Switzerland	3.30	613	431	
19=	Osvaldo Wenzel	Chile	3.20	575	406	
19=	Franz Sterzl	Austria	3.20	575	406	
21	Josef Klein	Czechoslovakia	3.10	538	381	
--	Émile Binet	Belgium	NM			

=== Javelin throw ===
Rank	Athlete	Country	Distance	Points	Adjusted Points	Notes
1	Edvard Natvig	Norway	58.36	748	713	
2	Helmut Bonnet	Germany	58.15	744	710	
3	Olle Bexell	Sweden	57.07	722	694	
4	Jack Parker	United States	56.46	710	685	
5	Erwin Huber	Germany	56.45	710	685	
6	Péter Bácsalmási	Hungary	55.90	6.99	676	
7	Reindert Brasser	Netherlands	55.75	696	674	
8	Osvaldo Wenzel	Chile	54.93	680	662	
9	Glenn Morris	United States	54.52	672	656	
10	Jerzy Pławczyk	Poland	54.26	667	652	
11	Fritz Dällenbach	Switzerland	52.39	632	624	
12	Josef Klein	Czechoslovakia	51.72	619	614	
13	Bob Clark	United States	51.12	608	605	
14	Armin Guhl	United States	51.02	606	604	
15	Aulis Reinikka	Finland	50.80	602	600	
16	Zoltán Csányi	Hungary	48.70	564	569	
17	Lyuben Doychev	Bulgaria	48.43	559	565	
18	Leif Dahlgren	Sweden	47.74	546	555	
19	Maurice Boulanger	Belgium	43.43	471	492	
20	Willy Bührer	Switzerland	43.10	466	487	
--	Franz Sterzl	Austria	NM			

=== 1500 metres ===
Rank	Athlete	Country	Time	Points	Adjusted Points	Notes
1	Aulis Reinikka	Finland	4:32.4	602	729	
2	Glenn Morris	United States	4:33.2	595	724	
3	Osvaldo Wenzel	Chile	4:34.6	584	715	
4	Maurice Boulanger	Belgium	4:35.0	581	712	
5	Erwin Huber	Germany	4:35.2	580	711	
6	Olle Bexell	Sweden	4:40.4	541	678	
7	Bob Clark	United States	4:44.4	513	653	
8	Fritz Dällenbach	Switzerland	4:48.0	489	631	
9	Armin Guhl	United States	4:49.2	481	623	
10	Josef Klein	Czechoslovakia	4:49.6	478	621	
11	Helmut Bonnet	Germany	4:54.0	450	595	
12	Jerzy Pławczyk	Poland	5:04.0	392	537	
13	Edvard Natvig	Norway	5:04.0	392	537	
14	Reindert Brasser	Netherlands	5:06.0	381	526	
15	Jack Parker	United States	5:07.8	371	516	
16	Péter Bácsalmási	Hungary	5:30.6	262	396	
17	Lyuben Doychev	Bulgaria	5:34.2	247	379	
--	Zoltán Csányi	Hungary	NM			
--	Leif Dahlgren	Sweden	NM			

=== Final standings ===
Rank	Athlete	Country	Points	Adjusted points	Notes
1st place, gold medalist(s)	Glenn Morris	United States	7900	7254	WR
2nd place, silver medalist(s)	Bob Clark	United States	7601	7063	
3rd place, bronze medalist(s)	Jack Parker	United States	7275	6760	
4	Erwin Huber	Germany	7087	6648	
5	Reindert Brasser	Netherlands	7046	6570	
6	Armin Guhl	Switzerland	7033	6618	
7	Olle Bexell	Sweden	7024	6558	
8	Helmut Bonnet	Germany	6939	6492	
9	Jerzy Pławczyk	Poland	6871	6446	
10	Edvard Natvig	Norway	6759	6453	
11	Aulis Reinikka	Finland	6755	6342	
12	Péter Bácsalmási	Hungary	6395	5979	
13	Fritz Dällenbach	Switzerland	6311	6030	
14	Lyuben Doychev	Bulgaria	6307	5944	
15	Osvaldo Wenzel	Chile	6058	5798	
16	Josef Klein	Czechoslovakia	5883	5718	
17	Maurice Boulanger	Belgium	5097	5020	
	Leif Dahlgren	Sweden			DNF
	Zoltán Csányi	Hungary			DNF
	Willy Bührer	Switzerland			DNF
	Franz Sterzl	Austria			DNF
	Émile Binet	Belgium			DNF
	Martti Tolamo	Finland			DNF
	Akilles Järvinen	Finland			DNF
	Jānis Dimza	Latvia			DNF
	Erwin Reimer	Chile			DNF
	Chang Singchow	Republic of China			DNF
	Karl Vilmundarson	Iceland			DNF

Key: DNF = Did not finish, WR = World record, OB = Olympic best
