= Athletics at the 1932 Summer Olympics – Men's decathlon =

Men's decathlon at the Games of the X Olympiad
- Dates: August 5 & August 6, 1932

Medalists
1st place, gold medalist(s)		Jim Bausch	United States
2nd place, silver medalist(s)		Akilles Järvinen	Finland
3rd place, bronze medalist(s)		Wolrad Eberle	Germany

The men's decathlon event at the 1932 Olympic Games took place between August 5 & August 6. Points are listed by the scoring table from 1912 which were used to determine the winner. Adjusted points are points using the 1985 scoring table. The official Olympic results shows both results, but medal winners were determined by the 1912 scoring table.

== Results ==
=== 100 metres ===
Rank	Athlete	Country	Time	Points	Adjusted Points	Notes
1T	Akilles Järvinen	Finland	11.1	881.0	786	
1T	Héctor Berra	Argentina	11.1	881.0	786	
3	Wilson Charles	United States	11.2	857.2	765	
4T	Clyde Coffman	United States	11.3	833.4	744	
4T	Bob Tisdall	Ireland	11.3	833.4	744	
4T	Jānis Dimza	Latvia	11.3	833.4	744	
7T	Wolrad Eberle	Germany	11.4	809.6	723	
7T	Hans-Heinrich Sievert	Germany	11.4	809.6	723	
7T	Erwin Wegner	Germany	11.4	809.6	723	
10	Zygmunt Siedlecki	Poland	11.6	762.0	683	
11T	Jim Bausch	United States	11.7	738.2	663	
11T	Harry Hart	South Africa	11.7	738.2	663	
13	Paavo Yrjölä	Finland	11.8	714.4	643	
14	Péter Bácsalmási	Hungary	12.0	666.8	605	
-	Carlos Woebcken	Brazil	-	0.0	-	DNF

=== Long jump ===
Rank	Athlete	Country	Distance	Points	Adjusted Points	Notes
1	Wilson Charles	United States	7.24	911.80	871	OB
2	Jānis Dimza	Latvia	7.22	906.90	866	
3	Héctor Berra	Argentina	7.14	887.30	847	
4	Akilles Järvinen	Finland	7.00	853.00	814	
5	Hans-Heinrich Sievert	Germany	6.97	845.65	807	
6	Jim Bausch	United States	6.95	840.75	802	
7T	Wolrad Eberle	Germany	6.77	796.65	760	
7T	Clyde Coffman	United States	6.77	796.65	760	
9	Péter Bácsalmási	Hungary	6.71	781.95	746	
10	Bob Tisdall	Ireland	6.60	755.00	720	
11	Paavo Yrjölä	Finland	6.59	752.55	718	
12	Zygmunt Siedlecki	Poland	6.49	728.05	695	
13	Erwin Wegner	Germany	6.41	708.45	677	
14	Harry Hart	South Africa	6.14	642.30	617	

=== Shot put ===
Rank	Athlete	Country	Distance	Points	Adjusted Points	Notes
1	Jim Bausch	United States	15.32	998	809	OB
2	Hans-Heinrich Sievert	Germany	14.50	916	759	
3	Jānis Dimza	Latvia	14.33	899	749	
4	Paavo Yrjölä	Finland	13.68	834	709	
5	Zygmunt Siedlecki	Poland	13.56	822	701	
6	Harry Hart	South Africa	13.31	797	686	
7	Wolrad Eberle	Germany	13.22	788	681	
8	Akilles Järvinen	Finland	13.11	777	674	
9	Bob Tisdall	Ireland	12.58	724	642	
10	Wilson Charles	United States	12.56	722	640	
11	Péter Bácsalmási	Hungary	11.90	656	600	
12	Clyde Coffman	United States	11.86	652	598	
13	Erwin Wegner	Germany	11.70	636	588	

=== High jump ===
Rank	Athlete	Country	Height	Points	Adjusted Points	Notes
1	Wilson Charles	United States	1.85	888	670	
2T	Hans-Heinrich Sievert	Germany	1.78	790	610	
2T	Jānis Dimza	Latvia	1.78	790	610	
4T	Akilles Järvinen	Finland	1.75	748	585	
4T	Paavo Yrjölä	Finland	1.75	748	585	
6T	Jim Bausch	United States	1.70	678	544	
6T	Clyde Coffman	United States	1.70	678	544	
6T	Péter Bácsalmási	Hungary	1.70	678	544	
6T	Zygmunt Siedlecki	Poland	1.70	678	544	
10T	Wolrad Eberle	Germany	1.65	608	504	
10T	Bob Tisdall	Ireland	1.65	608	504	
10T	Erwin Wegner	Germany	1.65	608	504	
10T	Harry Hart	South Africa	1.65	608	504	

=== 400 metres ===
Rank	Athlete	Country	Time	Points	Adjusted Points	Notes
1	Bob Tisdall	Ireland	49.0	969.92	855	OB
2	Akilles Järvinen	Finland	50.6	909.76	781	
3	Wolrad Eberle	Germany	50.8	902.24	772	
4	Wilson Charles	United States	51.2	887.20	754	
5	Erwin Wegner	Germany	51.6	872.16	736	
6	Clyde Coffman	United States	51.8	864.64	727	
7	Paavo Yrjölä	Finland	52.6	834.56	693	
8	Hans-Heinrich Sievert	Germany	53.6	796.96	650	
9T	Péter Bácsalmási	Hungary	53.8	789.44	642	
9T	Zygmunt Siedlecki	Poland	53.8	789.44	642	
11	Jim Bausch	United States	54.2	774.40	626	
12	Jānis Dimza	Latvia	54.8	751.84	601	
13	Harry Hart	South Africa	57.2	661.60	508	

=== 110 metre hurdles ===
Rank	Athlete	Country	Time	Points	Adjusted Points	Notes
1	Erwin Wegner	Germany	15.4	962.0	774	OB
2	Bob Tisdall	Ireland	15.5	952.5	762	
3	Harry Hart	South Africa	15.6	943.0	751	
4	Akilles Järvinen	Finland	15.7	933.5	740	
5	Hans-Heinrich Sievert	Germany	16.1	895.5	695	
6T	Jim Bausch	United States	16.2	886.0	684	
6T	Wilson Charles	United States	16.2	886.0	684	
8	Jānis Dimza	Latvia	16.4	867.0	662	
9	Wolrad Eberle	Germany	16.7	838.5	631	
10T	Paavo Yrjölä	Finland	17.0	810.0	599	
10T	Zygmunt Siedlecki	Poland	17.0	810.0	599	
12	Péter Bácsalmási	Hungary	17.7	743.5	530	
13	Clyde Coffman	United States	17.8	734.0	520	

=== Discus throw ===
Rank	Athlete	Country	Distance	Points	Adjusted Points	Notes
1	Jim Bausch	United States	44.58	976.06	758	OB
2	Hans-Heinrich Sievert	Germany	44.54	974.54	757	
3	Péter Bácsalmási	Hungary	41.45	857.12	694	
4	Wolrad Eberle	Germany	41.34	852.94	692	
5	Paavo Yrjölä	Finland	40.77	831.28	680	
6	Jānis Dimza	Latvia	40.76	830.90	680	
7	Harry Hart	South Africa	40.62	825.58	677	
8	Zygmunt Siedlecki	Poland	39.05	765.92	645	
9	Wilson Charles	United States	38.71	753.00	638	
10	Akilles Järvinen	Finland	36.80	680.42	600	
11	Clyde Coffman	United States	34.40	589.22	552	
12	Bob Tisdall	Ireland	33.31	547.80	530	
13	Erwin Wegner	Germany	33.26	545.90	529	

=== Pole vault ===
Rank	Athlete	Country	Height	Points	Adjusted Points	Notes
1	Jim Bausch	United States	4.00	1027	617	OB
1T	Clyde Coffman	United States	4.00	1027	617	OB
3	Akilles Järvinen	Finland	3.60	811	509	
4T	Wolrad Eberle	Germany	3.50	757	482	
4T	Péter Bácsalmási	Hungary	3.50	757	482	
4T	Jānis Dimza	Latvia	3.50	757	482	
7	Wilson Charles	United States	3.40	703	456	
8T	Hans-Heinrich Sievert	Germany	3.20	595	406	
8T	Bob Tisdall	Ireland	3.20	595	406	
10T	Paavo Yrjölä	Finland	3.10	541	381	
10T	Erwin Wegner	Germany	3.10	541	381	
10T	Harry Hart	South Africa	3.10	541	381	
13	Zygmunt Siedlecki	Poland	3.00	487	357	

=== Javelin throw ===
Rank	Athlete	Country	Distance	Points	Adjusted Points	Notes
1	Jim Bausch	United States	61.91	1025.025	767	OB
2	Akilles Järvinen	Finland	61.00	1000.000	753	
3	Wolrad Eberle	Germany	57.49	903.475	700	
4	Paavo Yrjölä	Finland	56.12	865.800	680	
5	Hans-Heinrich Sievert	Germany	53.91	805.025	647	
6	Erwin Wegner	Germany	53.83	802.825	645	
7	Harry Hart	South Africa	50.49	710.975	596	
8	Clyde Coffman	United States	48.88	666.700	572	
9	Péter Bácsalmási	Hungary	48.59	658.725	568	
10	Wilson Charles	United States	47.72	634.800	555	
11	Bob Tisdall	Ireland	45.26	567.150	519	

=== 1500 metres ===
Rank	Athlete	Country	Time	Points	Adjusted Points	Notes
1=	Wolrad Eberle	Germany	4:34.4	774.4	716	
1=	Bob Tisdall	Ireland	4:34.4	774.4	716	
3	Paavo Yrjölä	Finland	4:37.4	756.4	697	
4	Wilson Charles	United States	4:39.8	742.0	682	
5	Akilles Järvinen	Finland	4:47.0	698.8	637	
6	Erwin Wegner	Germany	4:47.8	694	632	
7	Clyde Coffman	United States	4:48.0	692.8	631	
8	Jim Bausch	United States	5:17.0	518.8	466	
9	Hans-Heinrich Sievert	Germany	5:18.0	512.8	461	
10	Péter Bácsalmási	Hungary	5:34.6	413.2	377	
11	Harry Hart	South Africa	5:48.2	331.6	314	

=== Final standings ===
Rank	Athlete	Country	Points	Adjusted Points	Notes
1st place, gold medalist(s)	Jim Bausch	United States	8462.235	6735	WR
2nd place, silver medalist(s)	Akilles Järvinen	Finland	8292.480	6879	
3rd place, bronze medalist(s)	Wolrad Eberle	Germany	8030.805	6661	
4	Wilson Charles	United States	7985.00	6716	
5	Hans-Heinrich Sievert	Germany	7941.075	6515	
6	Paavo Yrjölä	Finland	7687.990	6385	
7	Clyde Coffman	United States	7534.410	6265	
8	Bob Tisdall	Ireland	7327.170	6398	
9	Erwin Wegner	Germany	7179.935	6189	
10	Péter Bácsalmási	Hungary	7001.735	5788	
11	Harry Hart	South Africa	6799.255	5697	
-	Jānis Dimza	Latvia			DNF
-	Zygmunt Siedlecki	Poland			DNF
-	Héctor Berra	Argentina			DNF
-	Carlos Woebcken	Brazil			DNF

Key: WR = World Record, DNF = Did not finish, OB = Olympic best in decathlon
