= 1934 European Athletics Championships – Men's decathlon =

Men's decathlon at the European Athletics Championships

The men's decathlon at the 1934 European Athletics Championships was held in Turin, Italy, at the Stadio Benito Mussolini on 8 and 9 September 1934.

== Medalists ==
Gold	Hans-Heinrich Sievert; Germany
Silver	Leif Dahlgren; Sweden
Bronze	Jerzy Pławczyk; Poland

== Results ==
=== Final ===
8/9 September

The highest mark recorded in each event is highlighted in yellow

Rank	Name	Nationality	100m	LJ	SP	HJ	400m	110m H	DT	PV	JT	1500m	Points	Notes
1st place, gold medalist(s)	Hans-Heinrich Sievert	Germany	11.2	7.00	14.77	1.80	49.6	16.0	45.03	3.30	55.47	5:55.2	6667 (8103.245)	CR
2nd place, silver medalist(s)	Leif Dahlgren	Sweden	11.8	6.47	12.99	1.84	51.0	15.8	38.83	3.30	52.60	4:46.8	6490 (7770.83)	
3rd place, bronze medalist(s)	Jerzy Pławczyk	Poland	11.6	6.36	11.60	1.87	53.4	17.0	39.84	3.70	50.19	5:07.8	6179 (7552.345)	
4	Jānis Dimza	Latvia	11.6	6.84	14.81	1.87	55.8	17.2	43.53	3.20	46.20	5:39.6	6094 (7451.40)	
5	Armin Guhl	Switzerland	11.2	6.95	11.96	1.84	53.4	16.0	39.99	2.80	48.12	5:07.2	6250 (7347.47)	NR
6	Wolrad Eberle	Germany	11.6	5.98	12.98	1.65	51.4	19.8	38.74	3.20	58.91	4:46.6	5931 (7153.645)	
7	Eletto Contieri	Italy	11.6	6.35	11.68	1.75	51.6	17.6	32.66	3.00	48.79	4:45.2	5888 (6846.835)	
8	Hermann Ruckstuhl	Switzerland	12.0	5.84	11.97	1.65	53.0	16.4	35.90	3.20	43.77	5:05.4	5618 (6548.915)	
9	Maurice Boulanger	Belgium	12.0	6.28	10.81	1.60	53.0	18.4	28.90	3.40	46.46	4:33.0	5552 (6391.09)	NR
10	Giovanni Lux	Italy	12.0	5.68	12.38	1.65	57.0	17.6	33.58	3.30	52.92	5:28.0	5320 (6368.18)	
11	Stasis Sackus	Lithuania	12.4	5.92	11.13	1.50							DNF	

== Participation ==
According to an unofficial count, 11 athletes from 8 countries participated in the event.

- Belgium (1)
- Germany (2)
- Italy (2)
- Latvia (1)
- Lithuania (1)
- Poland (1)
- Sweden (1)
- Switzerland (2)
