= 1931 USA Outdoor Track and Field Championships =

American athletics championship event

- Dates: 3–4 July (men); 25 July (women)
- Host city: Lincoln, Nebraska (men); Jersey City, New Jersey (women)
- Venue: Memorial Stadium (men); Pershing Field (women)
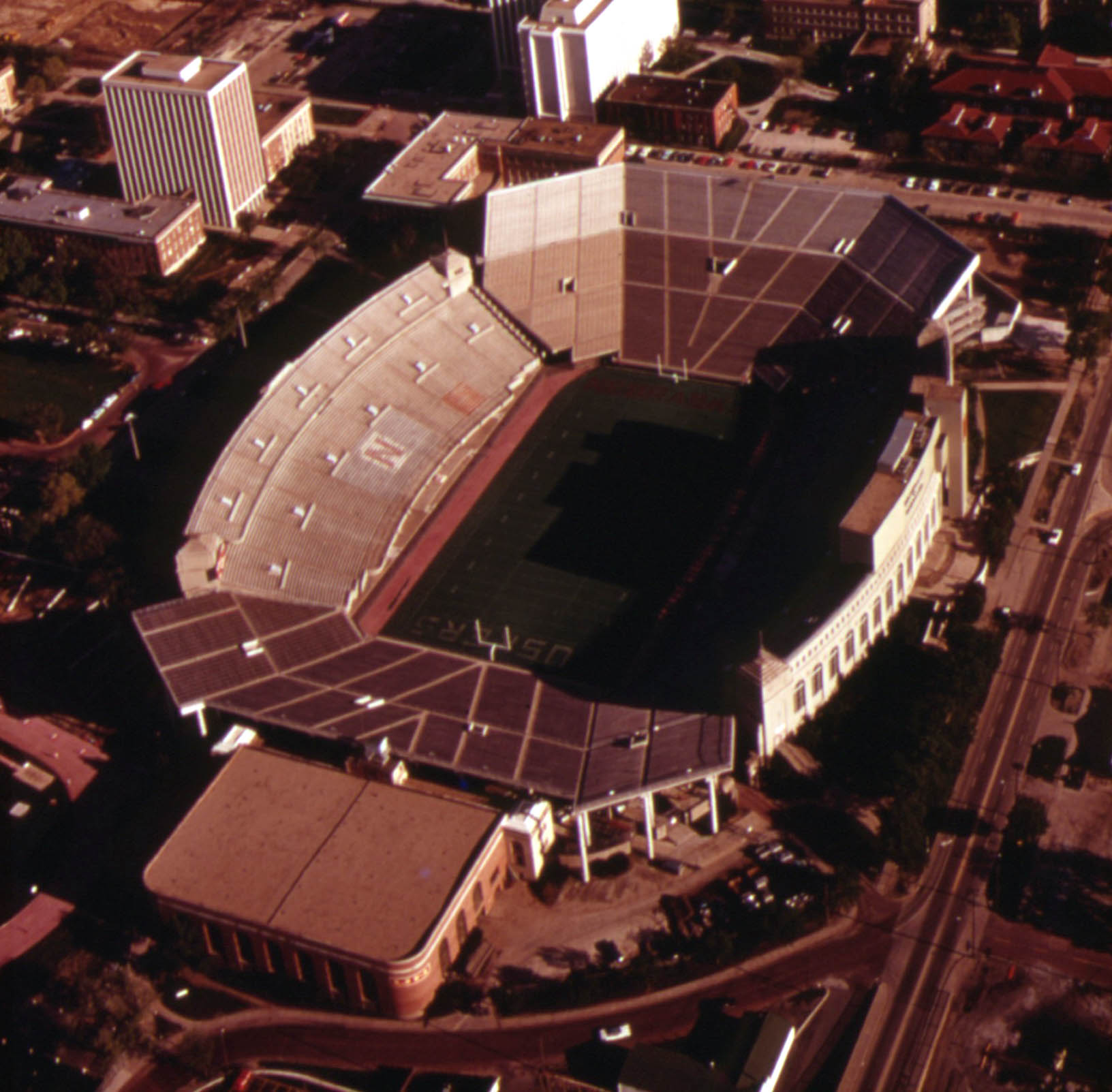

The 1931 USA Outdoor Track and Field Championships were organized by the Amateur Athletic Union (AAU) and served as the national championships in outdoor track and field for the United States.

The men's edition was held at Memorial Stadium in Lincoln, Nebraska, and it took place 3–4 July. The women's meet was held separately at Pershing Field in Jersey City, New Jersey, on 25 July.

At the men's championships, Percy Beard set the 110 m hurdles world record. In the women's competition, Babe Didrikson set the meet and American record in the baseball throw by throwing 296 feet (90 m). As the event fell out of favor after 1957, the mark is presumed by Track & Field News to be the world record for the farthest baseball throw by a woman as of 2021.

Though Stella Walsh did not compete in the women's discus throw, she stood in the outfield and helped return thrown discs back to the throwing area. One of her return throws struck James McBride, a spectator, and Walsh was subsequently arrested. Walsh was eventually set free, though she soon after moved to Poland and did not compete again at the USA Outdoor Championships until 1939.

== Results ==
=== Men ===
Event	Gold		Silver		Bronze	
100 yards	Frank Wykoff	9.5	Emmett Toppino		Eddie Tolan	
220 yards straight (Note: Race was held on a slight turn)	Eddie Tolan	21.0	Ralph Metcalfe		Cyrus Leland	
440 yards	Victor Williams	48.8	Art Woessner		Talbot Hartley	
880 yards	Edwin Genung	1:52.6	Otto Rosner		Dale Letts	
1 mile	Leo Lermond	4:15.0	Gene Venzke	4:15.2 e	Frank Crowley	4:15.9 e
10,000 m	Lou Gregory	31:26.4	William Zepp		Charles Shugert	
Marathon	William Agee	2:32:08.8	Yrjö Korholin-Koski (FIN)	2:44:00.0	Arthur Gavrin	2:47:01.0
120 yards hurdles	Percy Beard	14.2	James Hatfield	14.5 e	Lee Sentman	14.5 e
440 yards hurdles	Victor Burke	54.2	Richard Pomeroy		Eugene Beatty	
2 miles steeplechase	Joseph McCluskey	10:11.6	Forrest Harvey		J. Clifton Watson	
High jump	Anton Burg	1.97 m	Walter Marty	1.94 m	Parker Shelby	1.94 m
Pole vault	Jack Wool	4.07 m	Marvin Harvey	3.96 m	George Jefferson	3.96 m
Long jump	Al Bates	7.49 m	Ed Gordon	7.36 m	Everett Utterback	7.26 m
Triple jump	Robert Kelley	14.51 m	Levi Casey	14.48 m	George Martin	14.47 m
Shot put	Herman Brix	15.45 m	Leo Sexton	15.20 m	Paul Jessup	14.75 m
Discus throw	Paul Jessup	46.46 m	Ed Moeller	45.05 m	Harry Schneider	45.00 m
Hammer throw	Edward Flanagan	48.36 m	Ivan Dykeman	48.00 m	Norwood Wright	45.90 m
Javelin throw	James DeMers	64.44 m	Kenneth Churchill	59.82 m	Lee Weldon	58.04 m
Decathlon	Jesse Mortensen	8166.663 pts	Wilson Charles	7758.829 pts	Clyde Coffman	7575.820 pts
220 yards hurdles	Robert Maxwell	23.5				
Pentathlon	Jim Bausch	3776.585 pts				
Weight throw for distance	Leo Sexton	10.70 m				

=== Women ===
Event	Gold		Silver		Bronze	
50 yards	Alice Monk	6.4	Ethel Harrington		Mary Ladewig	
100 yards	Eleanor Egg	11.4	Evelyn Furtsch		Stanislawa Walasiewicz	
200 m	Stanislawa Walasiewicz	26.4	Olive Hasenfus		Catherine Capp	
80 m hurdles	Mildred Didrikson	12.0	Nellie Sharka		Evelyne Hall	
High jump	Jean Shiley	1.57 m	Annette Rogers	1.50 m	Genevieve Valvoda	1.47 m
Long jump	Mildred Didrikson	5.47 m	Nellie Todd	5.18 m	Alice Monk	5.05 m
Shot put	Lillian Copeland	12.25 m	Evelyn Ferrara	11.07 m	Mildred Yetter	10.99 m
Discus throw	Evelyn Ferrara	33.18 m	Lillian Copeland	33.09 m	Lucy Stratton	30.72 m
Javelin throw	Lillian Copeland	35.39 m	Elsie Sherman	33.55 m	Nan Gindele	32.92 m
Baseball throw	Babe Didrikson	296 ft 0 in (90.22 m)				

== See also ==
- 1931 USA Indoor Track and Field Championships
- List of USA Outdoor Track and Field Championships winners (men)
- List of USA Outdoor Track and Field Championships winners (women)
