= 1930 International University Games =

Multi-sport event in Darmstadt, Germany

- Poster
- Host city: Darmstadt, Germany
- Opening: 1 August 1930
- Closing: 10 August 1930

The 1930 International University Games were organised by the Confederation Internationale des Etudiants (CIE) and held in Darmstadt, Germany. Held from 1–10 August, thirty nations competed in a programme of eight sports. Women competed only in the athletics and swimming events.

== Sports ==
- Athletics
- Fencing
- Football
- Rowing
- Rugby union
- Swimming
- Tennis
- Water polo

== Athletics medal summary ==
=== Men ===
Event	Gold		Silver		Bronze	
100 metres	Helmut Körnig (GER)	10.6	Eugen Eldracher (GER)	10.9	István Raggambi (HUN)	10.9
200 metres	Helmut Körnig (GER)	21.5	Eugen Eldracher (GER)	21.9	Itaro Nakajima (JPN)	22.0
400 metres	Joseph Jackson (FRA)	49.5	Hans Noller (GER)	49.6	Patrick C. Moore (IRL)	50.0
800 metres	Fredy Müller (GER)	1:58.2	Francis Galtier (FRA)	1:58.3	Max Danz (GER)	1:58.7
1500 metres	Joseph Helps (ENG)	4:01.7	Gaston Leduc (FRA)	4:03.3	Karl-Gustav Dahlström (SWE)	4:04.6
5000 metres	Karl-Gustav Dahlström (SWE)	15:24.3	Eino Puukko (FIN)	15:27.5	Fritz Schilgen (GER)	15:27.7
110 metres hurdles	Tatsuo Fujita (JPN)	15.6	Henry P Bowler (ENG)	16.0	Stefan Nowosielski (POL)	16.1
400 metres hurdles	Joseph Simpson (ENG)	54.2?	John Lincoln (USA)	55.2	Mario De Negri (ITA)	55.4
4×100 metres relay	Germany (GER); Helmut Körnig; Adolf Metzner; Hans Salz; Eugen Eldracher	41.9	Japan (JPN); Teiichi Nishi; Kenkichi Oshima; Kichizo Sasaki; Takayoshi Yoshioka	42.4	Hungary (HUN); Lajos Balogh; János Paizs; Ernö Paku; Andor Iszo	43.0
4×400 metres relay	France (FRA); Joseph Jackson; Francis Galtier; Guy Fredet; André Lavier	3:19.6	Germany (GER); Max Danz; Hans Heinrich Nöller; Solmssen; Karl Leféber	3:22.4	Italy (ITA); Mario De Negri; Ugo Vianello; Manfredo Giacomelli; Giuseppe Curtoni	3:22.5
1600 metres medley relay	Germany (GER); Max Danz; Adolf Metzner; Eugen Eldracher; Karl Leféber	3:32.0	Italy (ITA); Mario De Negri; Giuseppe Tugnoli; Alberto D'Agostino; Giuseppe Curtoni	3:32.1	Japan (JPN); Itaro Nakajima; Teiichi Nishi; Takayoshi Yoshioka; Yashiwa	3:33.6
High jump	Ilmari Reinikka (FIN)	1.90	Kazuo Kimura (JPN)	1.87	Wilhelm Ladewig (GER)	1.84
Pole vault	Shuhei Nishida (JPN)	4.11	Shizuo Mochizuki (JPN)	3.80	István Király (HUN)	3.70
Long jump	Mikio Oda (JPN)	7.30	Lajos Balogh (HUN)	7.26	Willi Meier (GER)	7.15
Shot put	József Darányi (HUN)	15.21	Hans-Heinrich Sievert (GER)	14.53	Lawrence Levy (USA)	14.49
Discus throw	Olavi Vaalamo (FIN)	45.07	Nikolai Feldmann (EST)	43.97	József Darányi (HUN)	43.49
Javelin throw	Unto Suksi (FIN)	66.41	Ilmari Reinikka (FIN)	65.11	Gottfried Weimann (GER)	64.24
Pentathlon	Martti Tolamo (FIN)	3979.49	Jānis Dimza (LAT)	3755.18	Wilhelm Ladewig (GER)	3719.48

=== Women ===
Event	Gold		Silver		Bronze	
100 metres	Inge Braumüller (GER)	13.1	Liesbeth Freitag (GER)	13.2	Schlottmann (GER)	13.3
80 metres hurdles	Ilse Friedheim (GER)	13.2	Schlottmann (GER)	13.3	Helmi Singer (AUT)	14.1
High jump	Inge Braumüller (GER)	1.56	Helmi Singer (AUT)	1.39	Lowenherz (GER)	1.39
Long jump	Inge Braumüller (GER)	5.44	Schlottmann (GER)	5.33	Steyer (GER)	4.77

== Athletics medal table ==
Rank	Nation	Gold	Silver	Bronze	Total
1	Germany (GER)	8	8	9	25
2	Finland (FIN)	4	2	0	6
3	Japan (JPN)	3	2	1	6
4	France (FRA)	2	2	0	4
5	England (ENG)	2	1	0	3
6	Hungary (HUN)	1	1	3	5
7	Sweden (SWE)	1	0	1	2
8	Italy (ITA)	0	1	2	3
9	Austria (AUT)	0	1	1	2
9	United States (USA)	0	1	1	2
11	Estonia (EST)	0	1	0	1
11	Latvia (LAT)	0	1	0	1
13	Ireland (IRL)	0	0	1	1
13	Poland (POL)	0	0	1	1
Totals (14 entries)		21	21	20	62

== Participating nations ==
- Argentina
- Australia
- Austria
- Belgium
- Bulgaria
- Czechoslovakia
- Denmark
- Egypt
- Estonia
- Finland
- France
- Germany
- Hungary
- Ireland
- Italy
- Japan
- Latvia
- Luxembourg
- Great Britain
- Netherlands
- New Zealand
- Norway
- Poland
- South Africa
- Spain
- Sweden
- Switzerland
- United States

== See also ==
- FISU World University Games § Precursors
- University and college sport
