= 1938 European Athletics Championships – Men's decathlon =

Men's decathlon at the European Athletics Championships

The men's decathlon at the 1938 European Athletics Championships was held in Paris, France, at Stade Olympique de Colombes on 4 and 5 September 1938.

== Medalists ==
Gold	Olle Bexell; Sweden
Silver	Witold Gerutto; Poland
Bronze	Josef Neumann; Switzerland

== Results ==
=== Final ===
4/5 September

The highest mark recorded in each event is highlighted in yellow

Rank	Name	Nationality	100m	LJ	SP	HJ	400m	110m H	DT	PV	JT	1500m	Points	Notes
1st place, gold medalist(s)	Olle Bexell	Sweden	11.5	6.67	13.62	1.75	53.2	15.7	43.64	3.80	52.60	4:49.2	6687 (7214)	CR
2nd place, silver medalist(s)	Witold Gerutto	Poland	11.4	6.18	14.76	1.83	53.3	16.3	41.86	3.50	58.80	5:21.6	6459 (7006)	
3rd place, bronze medalist(s)	Josef Neumann	Switzerland	11.6	6.54	12.57	1.60	50.1	16.9	36.82	2.90	60.10	4:45.4	6228 (6664)	
4	Rudolf Glötzner	Germany	11.6	6.50	12.42	1.70	53.3	16.9	34.83	3.50	55.18	4:47.2	6173 (6492)	
5	Raymond Anet	Switzerland	11.5	6.14	10.21	1.65	51.8	15.7	32.80	3.30	44.68	4:42.0	5918 (6118)	
6	Jerzy Pławczyk	Poland	12.0	6.56	11.12	1.83	55.1	16.7	36.64	3.20	50.65	5:46.5	5665 (5946)	
7	Jean Balezo	France	11.5	6.75	11.84	1.65	55.2	18.2	30.89	3.00	37.50	5:12.8	5360 (5503)	
8	Hervé Mahé	France	12.2	5.73	12.13	1.70	57.9	19.3	35.52	3.10	49.84	5:15.2	5138 (5346)	
9	Hans-Heinrich Sievert	Germany	11.3	6.68	14.39	1.75							DNF	
10	Émile Binet	Belgium	11.5	6.50	8.63	1.60							DNF	

== Participation ==
According to an unofficial count, 10 athletes from 6 countries participated in the event.

- Belgium (1)
- France (2)
- Germany (2)
- Poland (2)
- Sweden (1)
- Switzerland (2)
