= Anna Kael =

Hungarian sportswoman (1908–1985)

Personal information
- Nationality: Hungarian
- Born: 2 January 1908 Újpest, Kingdom of Hungary
- Died: 24 February 1985 (aged 77) Budapest, Hungary
- Education: Royal Hungarian College of Physical Education
- Spouse: Lajos Balogh

Sport
- Country: Hungary
- Sport: Athletics, basketball, gymnastics
- Club: Testnevelési Főiskola SE
Medal record
Women’s gymnastics
Representing Hungary
World Championship
Silver medal – second place	1934 Budapest	Women's team
- Updated on 18 October 2014

Anna Kael (2 February 1908 – 24 February 1985) was a Hungarian all-round sportswoman and university professor. She competed successfully in athletics, basketball and gymnastics.

== Teaching career ==
Kael studied at the Royal Hungarian College of Physical Education, from where she graduated in 1929 as physical education teacher. Subsequently, she remained at the college and worked first as instructor and assistant professor beside Ottó Misángyi (1929–38), and later as full professor (1938–1950). Kael was a docent of the institution from 1950 until her retirement in 1964, including a period between 1950 and 1952 when she served as the head of the Faculty of Athletics.

== Sports career ==
Kael competed for Testnevelési Főiskola SE (TFSE), the sports club of the college during her whole career, that spanned over one and a half decade (1926–1944). Like most of the Hungarian sportswomen of her time, she started with gymnastics; she was part of the Hungarian team that finished fourth at the 1928 Summer Olympics in the women's team event. At the 1934 World Artistic Gymnastics Championships she won the silver medal in women's team final, and finished fourth in the individual all-around.

With the introduction of women's events to the Hungarian Athletics Championships program in 1932, Kael also changed her focus on athletics. She competed in a wide variety of disciplines, winning a total of 8 individual national titles. At the 1932 Hungarian Athletics Championships she won both in the high jump and the long jump, thus becoming the first ever Hungarian champion in these events; in 1936 she won the long jump again. Additionally, she won five titles in the discus throw (1934, 1936, 1937, 1939, 1944).

Kael also showed talent in basketball and was a member of the TFSE team that won the inaugural Hungarian basketball championship in 1933. She repeated this success in 1939 and 1942.

== Personal life ==
Kael married to Lajos Balogh, a fellow athlete, coach and engineer. They had one daughter, Anikó Balogh, who also became and athlete and competed in the javelin throw. Their grandsons, Attila Petőváry and Zsolt Petőváry are former Hungarian international water polo players.
