= Reinikka =

Reinikka is a surname. Notable people with the surname include:

- Aulis Reinikka (1915–1998), Finnish athlete
- Ilmari Reinikka (1906–1978), Finnish athlete
- Ollie Reinikka (1901–1962), Canadian ice hockey forward
- Tyko Reinikka (1887–1964), Finnish bank director and politician
