= Vilmundarson =

Vilmundarson is a surname. Notable people with the surname include:

- Karl Vilmundarson (1909–1983), Icelandic athlete
- Vilhjálmur Vilmundarson (1929–2020), Icelandic athlete
