= Guhl =

Guhl is a surname. Notable people with the surname include:

- Armin Guhl
- Ernst Guhl
