= Martti Tolamo =

Finnish athlete (1907–1940)

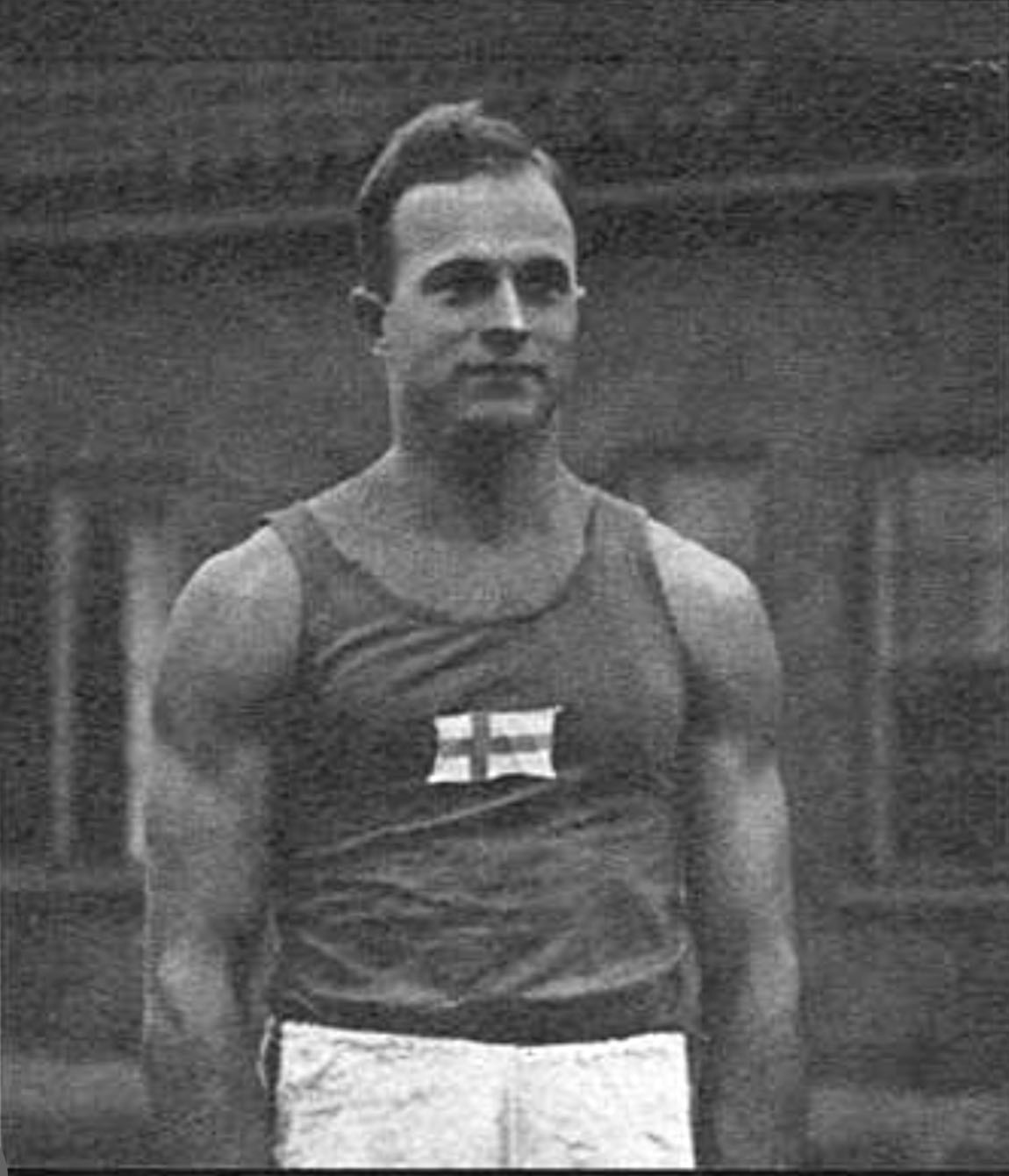

Personal information
- Nationality: Finnish
- Born: Martti Leo Topelius; 21 February 1907
- Died: 14 March 1940 (aged 33)
- Height: 1.84 m (6 ft 0 in)
- Weight: 76 kg (168 lb)

Achievements and titles
- Personal bests: Pentathlon: 4011 (1930); Long jump: 7.51 (1934)
Medal record
Men's athletics
Representing Finland
International University Games
Gold medal – first place	1930 Darmstadt	Pentathlon
Silver medal – second place	1933 Turin	Long jump
Bronze medal – third place	1933 Turin	Pentathlon

Martti Leo Tolamo (born Topelius; 21 February 1907 – 14 March 1940) was a Finnish athlete. He competed in the Olympic Games as a decathlete and a long jumper; his other strong event was the non-Olympic pentathlon, in which he broke the unofficial world record in 1930 and won two medals, including a gold, at the International University Games.

== Career ==
At the 1928 Olympics in Amsterdam, Tolamo competed in the decathlon, placing 16th. The following year he exceeded the Finnish long jump record with a jump of 7.42 m, but due to wind assistance that record could not be ratified.

At the 1930 Finnish Championships at Tampere he won the pentathlon with 4011 points, an unofficial world record. He also triumphed at that year's International University Games, scoring 3979 points to secure gold ahead of Latvia's Jānis Dimza. Tolamo's world record was broken the following year by compatriot javelin thrower Matti Sippala; however, with modern scoring tables Tolamo's score would have remained the record, and it eventually re-emerged as a national pentathlon best, only broken in 2007.

Tolamo legitimately broke the Finnish long jump record in 1933 in a dual meet between Finland and Norway, jumping 7.46 m. At that year's International University Games he won silver in the long jump and bronze in the pentathlon. He broke his own national long jump record in September 1934, in another dual meet (between Finland and Germany); he jumped 7.51 m and defeated both Wilhelm Leichum, who had won the European championship the previous week, and future Olympic silver medalist Luz Long. That jump remained the Finnish record until 1954, when Jorma Valkama broke it.

Tolamo returned to the Olympics in 1936, competing in both the decathlon and the long jump. He failed to make the final in the long jump and did not finish in the decathlon.

He was wounded in action in March 1940 and died in war hospital five days later.
