= Latvia at the 1932 Summer Olympics =

- IOC code: LAT
- NOC: Latvian Olympic Committee

in Los Angeles
- Competitors: 2
- Flag bearer: Jānis Dimza
- Medals Ranked 22nd: Gold 0 Silver 1 Bronze 0 Total 1

Summer Olympics appearances (overview)
- 1924; 1928; 1932; 1936; 1948–1988; 1992; 1996; 2000; 2004; 2008; 2012; 2016; 2020; 2024

Other related appearances
- Russian Empire (1908–1912); Soviet Union (1952–1988)

Latvia participated at the 1932 Summer Olympics in Los Angeles, United States, held between 30 July and 14 August 1932. The country's participation in the Games marked its third appearance at the Summer Olympics since its debut in the 1924 Games.

The Latvian team consisted of two athletes who competed across two events in athletics. Jānis Dimza served as the country's flag-bearer during the opening ceremony. Latvia won its first ever Olympic medal at the Games. The lone silver medal was won by Jānis Daliņš, and the country was ranked 22nd in the medal table.

== Background ==
The 1924 Summer Olympics marked Latvia's first participation in the Olympic Games. After the nation made its debut in the Summer Olympics at the 1924 Games, this edition of the Games in 1932 marked the nation's third appearance at the Summer Games.

The 1932 Summer Olympics was held in Los Angeles between 30 July and 14 August 1932. The Latvian delegation consisted of two athletes. Jānis Dimza served as the country's flag-bearer in the Parade of Nations during the opening ceremony.

== Medalists ==
Latvia won its first ever Olympic medal at the Games. The lone silver medal was won by Jānis Daliņš, and the country was ranked 22nd in the medal table.

Medal	Name	Sport	Event
Silver	Jānis Daliņš	Athletics	Men's 50 km Walk

== Competitors ==
Latvia sent two athletes who competed in two events in a single sport at the Games.

Sport	Men	Women	Athletes
Athletics	2	0	2
Total	2	0	2

== Athletics ==
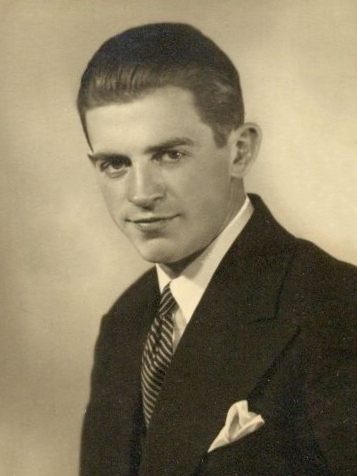
Jānis Daliņš won Latvia's first ever Olympic medal at the 1932 Games

Athletics competitions were held between 31 July and 7 August 1932 at the Los Angeles Memorial Coliseum. Jānis Daliņš and Jānis Dimza participated in two events in the competition.

Daliņš participated in the men's 50 km racewalk event, which was conducted for the first time in Summer Olympics. Dāliņš started competing in race walk events from the age of 22, and was the Latvian record holder in the 5 km race walk. He competed in his first international race in 1929. Prior to the Olympics, he set a world record in the 25 mile race walk in June 1932 in the Latvian capital of Riga. He won a silver medal after completing the course in over four hours and 57 minutes, more than seven minutes behind the first placed Tommy Green of Great Britain. This was the country's first ever Olympic medal.

Dimza competed in the Men's decathlon event held on 5 and 6 August 1932. He completed only eight out of ten events, and was not classified in the final ranking.

Track & road events

Athlete	Event	Result	Rank
Jānis Daliņš	Men's 50 km walk	4:57:20	2nd place, silver medalist(s)

Combined events

Athlete	Event	Competition	100	LJ	SP	HJ	400 m	100H	JT	PV	JT	1500 m	Final	Rank
Jānis Dimza	Men's Decathlon	Result	11.3	7.22	14.33	1.78	54.8	16.4	40.76	3.50	DNS		DNF	
Jānis Dimza	Men's Decathlon	Points	744	866	749	610	601	662	680	482	DNF		DNF	

== Art competitions ==
The art competition consisted a competition between various entries to be sent by the National Olympic Committees across the specified categories. Only artworks by living artists were allowed, the works had to have been produced not earlier than 1 January 1928, and it was not allowed to submit works from the previous Olympics. The works were to be sent to the Olympic Committee by 1 June 1932.

For the art competitions, medals were awarded to the winning artists during the Games. However, the International Olympic Committee (IOC) later classified these art competitions as unofficial Olympic events, and do not appear in the IOC database. The medals were not counted towards the final medal tally. Three Latvian artists participated in the art competitions.

Athlete	Event	Title	Rank
Ernests Elks-Elksnītis	Music		Not Awarded
Friedrich Baur	Painting	Pour la victoire, Mer calme, Yachting, Retour	Not Awarded
Konstantīns Visotskis	Painting	Bear Sticking, Hunting Snow Hare, Exercising Hounds, Hunting Wolves with Borzois, Beaters, Fox Shooting with Flags, Gunner Awaiting Driven Game	Not Awarded
