= Gabriella Csire =

Romanian children's book writer

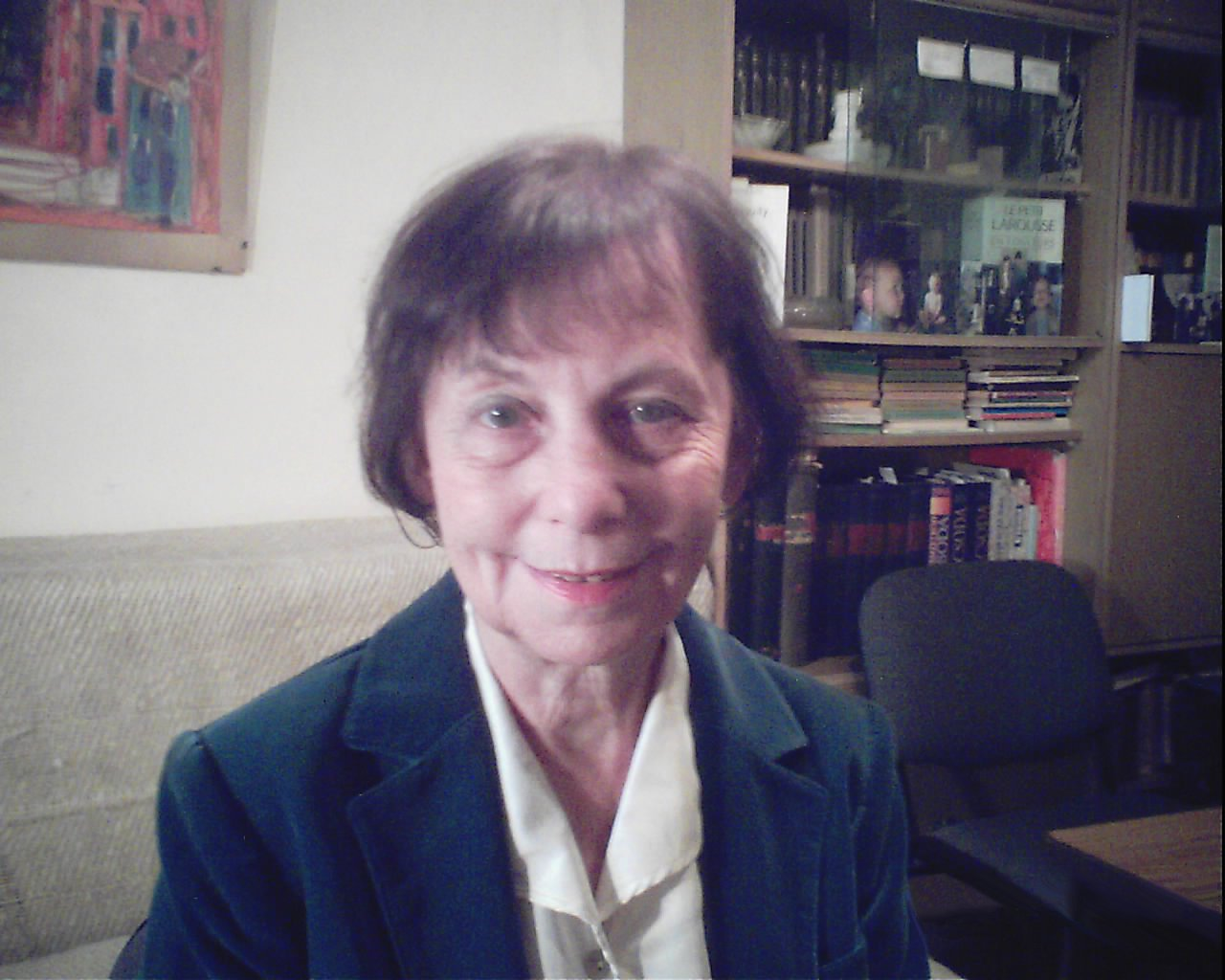
Gabriella Csire (2007)

Gabriella Csire (born 21 April 1938) is a Romanian writer and children's literature author.

== Life ==
She was born in Ocna Mureș, Alba County into an ethnic Hungarian family. At the age of two she moved with her parents to Cluj (Kolozsvár), where she graduated in 1954 from high school. In 1959, she graduated from the former Bolyai University (now Babeș-Bolyai University), at the department of Hungarian Language and Literature. She then moved to Bucharest, where she was a redactor at Irodalmi Könyvkiadó (National Publishing for Literature), then at several journals and newspapers, most of them being youth magazines: Tanügyi Újság, Előre and Jóbarát, and Cimbora between 1990 and 1992, where she worked as an editor in chief. She wrote articles, short stories, fairy tales and fairy novels. She is member of the Writers' Union of Romania.

== Published books ==
- Pikk-pakk lámpa. Turpi meséi (ill: Szabó Erzsébet), 2015.
- Görög regevilág, 2014.
- Erdélyi mondák és históriák, 2012.
- Tündér Ibolya (ill. Péter Katalin), 2011.
- Észak ékes csillaga (ill. Péter Katalin), 2011.
- Kalevala messze földjén (ill. Szabó Erzsébet) 2011.
- A magyarság mondáiból, 2010.
- A nagy erejű Toldi (ill. Péter Katalin), 2010.
- Csaba és a Nap fia (ill: Emese Keller), 2009.
- Lúdas Matyi három arca (ill: Emese Keller), 2009.
- Szuhay Mátyás tréfája (ill: Emese Keller), 2009.
- Árgirus királyfi és az aranyalmák (ill: Emese Keller), 2009.
- A párjanincs János Vitéz (ill: Emese Keller), 2009.
- Vitéz Háry János (ill: Emese Keller), 2009.
- Az Ótestamentum igazgyöngyei (ill: Emese Keller), 2008.
- Egy magyar kalandor ifjúsága (ill: Stefánia Felszegi), 2008.
- Csillagregék (Gábor Csire ral), 2007.
- Szavak Háza – A varázsló kosara (with József Csire), 2007.
- Trója, 2006.
- Gilgames álmai 2005.
- Görög regevilág. Héroszok, 2005.
- Görög regevilág. Istenek, 2004.
- Az aranyhal palotája (ill: Stefánia Felszegi), 2004.
- Bűvös dalnok (with József Csire), 2003
- Turpi lak (ill: Stefánia Felszegi), 2002.
- Itt járt Mátyás király (ill: Stefánia Felszegi), 2001.
- Münchhausen báró barangolásai (ill: Stefánia Felszegi), 2001.
- Legendele constelațiilor (ill: Marian Voinea), 2001.
- Kalevala, țara îndepărtată (ill: Marian Voinea), 2001.
- Elek apó Cimboraja, 2000.
- Odüsszeusz, a vándor (ill: István Damó), 2000.
- Ráma és Szítá csodálatos története, 1997.
- Bambuszka (with Gábor Csire), 1997.
- Áprilisi tréfa, 1996.
- 9 bolygó meg 1 Nap (with Gábor Csire), 1996.
- Csillagregék (with Gábor Csire), 1995.
- Kalevala messze földjén (ill: Ibolya Vándor-Várhegyi), 1995.
- Elek apó Cimborája (ill. Levente Csutak), 1994.
- Kaktusztövis (ill: Emese Keller) 1991.
- Álomfestő Bíborka - A Kása-barlang titka (ill: István Damó) 1988.
- A forrás titka (ill: István Damó), 1985.
- A varázsló kosara (József Csire fel), 1984.
- Mókus Pali vándorúton (ill: Emese Keller), 1983.
- Az anyám és én (ill: Sándor Plugor), 1982.
- Álomhajó (ill: Lajos Balogh), 1980.
- Bűvös dalnok (with József Csire), (ill: Lajos Balogh) 1978.
- Turpi és Világjáró Kópé (ill: Sándor Karancsi), 1976.
- Turpi meséi (ill: László Labancz), 1971.
- Pandóra szelencéi (ill: V. Socolnic), 1969.

== Sources ==
- "Székely Útkereső" magazine: 1998/1-2-3-4; p. 8. (in Hungarian)
- Romániai Magyar Irodalmi Lexikon (Romano-Hungarian Literary Encyclopedia) (in Hungarian)
