= Helmut Bonnet =

German decathlete (1910–1944)

Personal information
- Nationality: German
- Born: 17 July 1910; Spandau, German Empire
- Died: 27 September 1944 (aged 34); Haapsalu, Reichskommissariat Ostland

Sport
- Sport: Athletics
- Event: Decathlon

Helmut Bonnet (17 July 1910 – 27 September 1944) was a German athlete. He competed in the men's decathlon at the 1936 Summer Olympics. He was killed in action during World War II.
