= Jim Bausch =

American athlete (1906–1974)

James Bausch
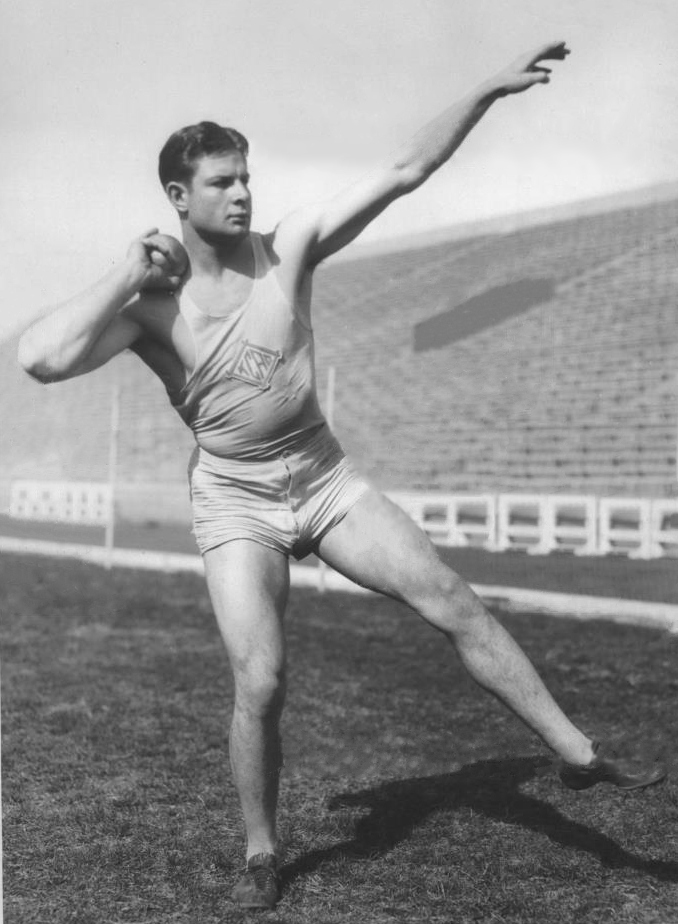
- Bausch in 1931

Personal information
- Born: James Aloysius Bernard Bausch; March 29, 1906 Marion, South Dakota, U.S.
- Died: July 9, 1974 (aged 68) Hot Springs, Arkansas, U.S.
- Height: 188 cm (6 ft 2 in)
- Weight: 95 kg (209 lb)
- Football career

No. 47
- Position: Halfback

Personal information
- Listed height: 6 ft 1 in (1.85 m)
- Listed weight: 200 lb (91 kg)

Career information
- High school: Wichita Cathedral (Wichita, Kansas)
- College: Kansas

Career history
- Chicago Cardinals (1933); Cincinnati Reds (1933)

Awards and highlights
- 2× First-team All-Big Six (1929, 1930)
- College Football Hall of Fame

Sport
- Sport: Athletics
- Event: Decathlon
- Club: Kansas City Athletic Club

Achievements and titles
- Personal bests: PV – 4.05 m (1930); SP – 15.33 m (1932)
Medal record
Men's athletics
Representing the United States
Olympic Games
Gold medal – first place	1932 Los Angeles	Decathlon

James Aloysius Bernard "Jarring Jim" Bausch (March 29, 1906 – July 9, 1974) was an American athlete who played collegiate and professional football and competed in track and field, mainly in the decathlon.

== Biography ==
Bausch grew up in and attended school in Garden Plain, Kansas, before finishing and graduating from Cathedral High School in Wichita, Kansas, and went to college at the University of Kansas, where he starred in football and basketball. Bausch was an All-American for the Kansas Jayhawks track and field team, finishing 6th in the shot put at the 1930 NCAA Track and Field Championships. He competed for the United States in the 1932 Summer Olympics held in Los Angeles in the decathlon. Bausch only placed fifth after the first day, but splendid performances in the discus throw and pole vault helped him to build an insurmountable lead and win the gold medal over the heavily favored Finnish athlete Akilles Järvinen.

Bausch played college football at the Municipal University of Wichita, now known as Wichita State University, and the University of Kansas. He was inducted into the College Football Hall of Fame in 1954. Bausch also played professional football as a halfback in the National Football League (NFL) for the Chicago Cardinals and Cincinnati Reds.

After retiring from competitions, Bausch tried a career as a nightclub singer before becoming an insurance salesman. During World War II, while serving with the U.S. Navy in the Pacific, he contracted osteomyelitis, and the associated pain resulted in alcoholism. Bausch eventually overcame both problems, and in his later years helped other osteomyelitis patients.

Records
Preceded by Akilles Järvinen	Men's Decathlon World Record Holder; August 6, 1932 – July 8, 1934	Succeeded by Hans-Heinrich Sievert
