= Josef Klein =

Czechoslovak athlete

Personal information
- Nationality: Czechoslovak
- Born: 12 November 1916 Vienna, Austria
- Died: 2 November 1941 (aged 24) Kaliningrad, Russia

Sport
- Sport: Athletics
- Event(s): Javelin throw Decathlon
- Club: University of Cambridge AC; Achilles Club; VSK Lobositz

Josef Friederich Karl Klein (12 November 1916 – 2 November 1941) was a Czechoslovak athlete. He competed in the men's javelin throw and the men's decathlon at the 1936 Summer Olympics.

Klein was educated in his native Czechoslovakia and at Emmanuel College, Cambridge, where he read the modern and medieval languages tripos and graduated with a BA in 1938. A member of the Czech resistance following the outbreak of World War II, he reportedly died shortly after being released from captivity, during which he was allegedly tortured.
