= Josef Neumann =

Swiss javelin thrower and decathlete

Personal information
- Nationality: Swiss
- Born: 18 March 1911
- Died: 8 April 1994 (aged 83) Rorschach, Switzerland

Sport
- Sport: Athletics
- Event: Javelin throw
Medal record
Men's athletics
Representing Switzerland
European Championships
Bronze medal – third place	1938 Paris	Decathlon

Josef Neumann (18 March 1911 – 8 April 1994) was a Swiss athlete. He competed in the men's javelin throw at the 1936 Summer Olympics. At the 1938 European Athletics Championships, he won bronze in the men's decathlon.
