= Tarzan's Revenge =

1938 American film directed by D. Ross Lederman

- Directed by: D. Ross Lederman
- Screenplay by: Robert Lee Johnson; Jay Vann
- Based on: Characters created by Edgar Rice Burroughs
- Produced by: Sol Lesser
- Starring: Glenn Morris; Eleanor Holm; Hedda Hopper
- Cinematography: George Meehan
- Edited by: Gene Milford; Bert Jordan
- Music by: Hugo Riesenfeld
- Distributed by: 20th Century Fox
- Release date: January 7, 1938
- Running time: 70 minutes
- Country: United States
- Language: English

Tarzan's Revenge is a 1938 American adventure film starring Glenn Morris in his only outing as Tarzan. Eleanor Holm, a popular swimming star, co-starred as Eleanor Reed. The film was produced by Sol Lesser, written by Robert Lee Johnson and Jay Vann (based on the character created by Edgar Rice Burroughs) and directed by D. Ross Lederman. Sol Lesser cast two Olympic athletes in Tarzan's Revenge: 1936 decathlon champion Glenn Morris as Tarzan and aquatic medal-winner Eleanor Holm as "Eleanor".

== Plot ==
The full film

Eleanor Reed accompanies her parents, Roger and Penny, and Nevin Potter, her fiance, on an expedition to Africa to capture wild animals to sell to a zoo. Ben Alleu Bey spots Eleanor and wishes her to become the one hundredth wife in his harem. When she refuses, he follows their safari.

Both groups are followed closely by Tarzan, who releases the animals and woos Eleanor away from both Nevin and Bey. When Nevin discovers that Eleanor plans to remain behind with Tarzan, he attempts to kill him but only grazes his shoulder with a round fired at close range. Tarzan attacks Nevin but releases him at Eleanor's behest. As the Reeds' ship sails down the river, Tarzan and Eleanor go for a swim.

== Cast ==
- Glenn Morris as Tarzan
- Eleanor Holm as Eleanor Reed
- George Meeker as Nevin Potter, Eleanor's fiance
- Hedda Hopper as Penny Reed, Eleanor's mother
- George Barbier as Roger Reed, Eleanor's father
- C. Henry Gordon as Ben Alleu Bey
- Joe Sawyer as Olaf Punch (as Joseph Sawyer)
- Corbet Morris as Jigger - Nevin's Servant
- John Lester Johnson as Koki - Chief Bearer
- Frederick Clarke as Ben Alleu's Servant

== Critical response ==
Tarzan's Revenge has received negative critical responses, with the film described as "[p]reposterous from beginning to end" and "absurd." Lead actor Morris was described as "an irredeemably awful actor" whose jungle yell is "so ludicrous as to be laughable."

== Production notes ==
Producer Sol Lesser originally considered casting baseball great Lou Gehrig as Tarzan, but was unimpressed with Gehrig's legs, calling them "more functional than decorative."

Lesser refused to call the lead female character Jane—according to him, Eleanor Holm was so famous for her swimming exploits that audiences would not accept her portraying anyone other than someone named Eleanor.
