= Zoltán Csányi =

Hungarian decathlete

Personal information
- Nationality: Hungarian
- Born: 26 December 1912; Esztergom, Austria-Hungary
- Died: 6 January 1993 (aged 80); Budapest, Hungary

Sport
- Sport: Athletics
- Event: Decathlon

Zoltán Csányi (26 December 1912 – 6 January 1993) was a Hungarian athlete. He competed in the men's decathlon at the 1936 Summer Olympics.
