= Harry Hart (athlete) =

South African athlete (1905–1979)

Personal information
- Full name: Hendrik Beltsazer Hart
- Born: 2 September 1905 Harrismith, Free State, South Africa
- Died: 10 November 1979 (aged 74) Reitz, Free State, South Africa
- Height: 190 cm (6 ft 3 in)
- Weight: 93 kg (205 lb)

Sport
- Country: South Africa
- Sport: Athletics
- Event: Shot put/discus/decathlon/javelin
Medal record
Men's athletics
Representing South Africa
British Empire Games
| Gold medal – first place | 1930 Hamilton | Discus throw |
| Gold medal – first place | 1930 Hamilton | Shot put |
| Gold medal – first place | 1934 London | Discus throw |
| Gold medal – first place | 1934 London | Shot put |
| Silver medal – second place | 1934 London | Javelin throw |
| Bronze medal – third place | 1930 Hamilton | Javelin throw |

Hendrik Beltsazer Hart (2 September 1905 – 10 November 1979) was a South African athlete who competed in the 1932 Summer Olympics.

== Biography ==
Hart was born in Harrismith, Orange River Colony. He won the British AAA Championships title in the decathlon event at the 1928 AAA Championships. Shortly afterwards he represented Great Britain at the 1928 Olympic Games in Amsterdam, Netherlands, where he

At the 1930 British Empire Games he won the gold medal in the discus throw event as well as in the shot put competition. He also won the bronze medal in the javelin throw contest and finished fifth in the 120 yards hurdles event. In the 440 yards hurdles competition he was eliminated in the heats.

Hart won the British AAA Championships shot put title at the 1932 AAA Championships. Shortly afterwards he finished tenth in the Olympic shot put event, eleventh in the decathlon competition, and twelfth in the discus throw contest.

Four years later at the 1934 British Empire Games he won again the gold medal in the discus throw event as well as in the shot put competition. In the javelin throw contest he won the silver medal.

Hart was the owner of the Royal Hotel in Reitz, Free State, South Africa. He was friends with Douglas Fairbanks, Errol Flynn, Clark Gable, Johnny Weissmuller and Blackie Swarts (at that time a cowboy actor and later the first president of South Africa). He was offered the part of Tarzan but refused as he had to return home to his farm to practice for the Empire Games. He had a study-trophy room at his hotel where there were hundreds of photographs of himself in the company of the above-mentioned and Esther Williams, Maureen O'Sullivan and others.

He died in Reitz
