= Franz Sterzl =

Austrian athlete (1908–2000)

Personal information
- Full name: Franz Josef Sterzl
- Nationality: Austrian
- Born: 6 February 1908 Aspang-Markt, Austria-Hungary
- Died: 9 February 2000 (aged 92) Salzburg, Austria

Sport
- Sport: Athletics
- Event: Decathlon

Franz Sterzl (6 February 1908 – 9 February 2000) was an Austrian athlete. He competed in the men's decathlon at the 1936 Summer Olympics.
