= Carlos Woebcken =

Brazilian athlete

Personal information
- Nationality: Brazilian
- Born: 5 June 1901; Hamburg, German Empire
- Died: 12 July 1962 (aged 61)

Sport
- Sport: Athletics
- Event: Decathlon

Carlos Woebcken (5 June 1901 – 12 July 1962) was a Brazilian athlete. He competed in the men's decathlon at the 1932 Summer Olympics.
