= Lajos Balogh =

Hungarian athlete and coach

Personal information
- Nationality: Hungarian
- Born: 10 May 1903 Budapest, Kingdom of Hungary
- Died: 9 October 1986 (aged 83) Csákvár, Hungary
- Education: Budapest University of Technology and Economics
- Occupations: Engineer, architect
- Years active: 1922–1944
- Spouse: Anna Kael
- Children: Anikó

Sport
- Country: Hungary
- Sport: Athletics
- Club: Műegyetemi AFC (1922–36); Magyar AC (1937–44)

Achievements and titles
- Personal best: Long jump – 7.49 m (1933)
Medal record
Men's athletics
Representing Hungary
Universiade
Silver medal – second place	1930 Darmstadt	Long jump
Bronze medal – third place	1928 Paris	Long jump
- Updated on 24 October 2014

Lajos Balogh (Hungarian pronunciation: [ˈlɒjoʃ ˈbɒloɡ]; 10 May 1903 – 9 October 1986) was a Hungarian athlete and later coach, architect, engineer, politician and sports official. Achieving his best results in the long jump, Balogh was a multiple Hungarian Athletics Championships winner, Universiade medalist and Olympic participant.

Beside his competitive sports career Balogh worked as engineer and architect, focusing on sports and training constructions. He was a member of the Independent Smallholders, Agrarian Workers and Civic Party and was arrested together with a number of other party members with fabricated charges in 1947, when the Communist Party carried out a coup d’état against the ruling Smallholders Party. He was soon released.

After retiring from sports he earned a coaching degree and also studied the biomechanics of sports movements. He was president of the Hungarian Athletics Association for a brief period in 1946 and later became a docent at the Faculty of Athletics of the University of Physical Education.

== Career ==
=== Athletics career ===
Born in Budapest, the capital of Hungary, Balogh competed for Műegyetemi AFC – the sports club of the Budapest University of Technology and Economics – between 1922 and 1936, subsequently he switched to Magyar AC (1937–1944). Competing in sprint events, decathlon and long jump, Balogh achieved his best results in the latter one, winning four Hungarian Athletics Championships titles (1928, 1930, 1931, 1933). He also improved the Hungarian national record, first in 1929 to 7.43 metres, then in 1933 to 7.49 metres.

During his university years he participated at the Universiade – also known then as Student World Championships and International University Games –, winning the bronze medal in the long jump in 1928 and the silver in 1930. Balogh was also present at the 1928 Summer Olympics in Amsterdam. Allocated to the Group C in the qualifying round of the long jump, he finished sixth of out then jumpers with 6.79 metres, thus failed to make it to the final round and eventually ranked 23rd.

Balogh won the British AAA Championships title in the long jump event at the 1933 AAA Championships.

After his retirement he worked as a coach and sports official and earned his coaching diploma in 1953. One of his most notable students is Olympic champion high jumper Ibolya Csák. In 1946 he acted as president of the Hungarian Athletics Association for a brief period.

=== Outside sports ===
Balogh graduated from the Budapest University of Technology and Economics in 1931, subsequently he worked for Óbuda Bridge Engineering Company and Budapest Electronic Works. In 1946 he was promoted to Deputy Head of the Energy Policy Division of Ministry of Industry, however, a year later he was arrested by the Communists with the fabricated charge of conspiration against the state. He was eventually released and worked as engineer first for Ganz Electric Works (1948–1949), then for the Metalworkers' Union of Budapest and later for the Gheorghiu Dej Shipbuilding Company (1951–1956). After 1956 he became a docent at the Faculty of Athletics of the University of Physical Education, a position he held until 1963.

As an architect he planned and constructed sports facilities. Among his notable works are the stadium of Pécsi VSK, the training fields of the Népstadion and the facilities of Vasas SC and Budapest Honvéd SE. He also contributed to the rebuilding and expansion of the sports center of MTK Budapest and Újpesti TE.

== Personal life ==
Balogh married to Anna Kael, a fellow sportswoman and silver medalist of World Gymnastics Championships in 1934. Their daughter, Anikó Balogh, became an athlete and competed in the javelin throw. Their grandsons, Attila Petőváry and Zsolt Petőváry are former Hungarian international water polo players.
