= Erwin Wegner =

German athlete

Medal record

Men's athletics

Representing Germany

European Championships
Silver medal – second place	1934 Turin	110 m hurdles

International University Games
Gold medal – first place	1935 Budapest	110 m hurdles
Silver medal – second place	1933 Turin	110 m hurdles
Silver medal – second place	1935 Budapest	400 m hurdles

Erwin Wegner (5 April 1909 – 16 February 1945) was a German athlete, born in Stettin. Wegner won the silver medal at the 1934 European Championships in the 110 metres hurdles and competed in the Olympic Games as both a hurdler and a decathlete.

== Career ==
At the 1932 Summer Olympics in Los Angeles Wegner competed in the 110 m hurdles and the decathlon. In the hurdles he placed third in his heat in 15.1 and qualified for the semi-finals, where he failed to finish. In the decathlon he placed ninth, winning the hurdles in 15.4 ahead of another specialist, Bob Tisdall.

At the 1934 European Championships in Turin Wegner won the silver medal in the hurdles in 14.9, losing only to Hungary's József Kovács. Wegner defeated Kovács at the International University Games in Budapest the following year, winning the gold in 14.7.

Wegner returned to the Olympics in 1936, this time only competing in the 110 m hurdles and again going out in the semi-finals. His personal best in the 110 m hurdles was 14.5, which he ran in 1935. He was also good in the 400 m hurdles, winning silver behind Kovács in that event at the 1935 International University Games.

An SS officer, Wegner was killed in action in the last months of World War II in France.
