= Lyuben Doychev =

Bulgarian decathlete

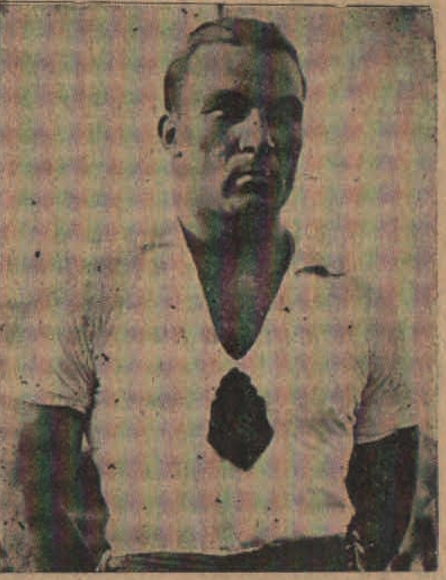

Personal information
- Nationality: Bulgarian
- Born: 26 October 1911
- Died: 28 August 1956 (aged 44); Jena, Germany

Sport
- Sport: Athletics
- Event: Decathlon

Lyuben Doychev (October 26, 1911 – August 28, 1956) was a Bulgarian athlete. He competed in the men's decathlon at the 1936 Summer Olympics.
