= Willy Bührer =

Swiss decathlete

Personal information
- Nationality: Swiss
- Born: 24 April 1912
- Died: 11 June 1990 (aged 78); Neuhausen am Rheinfall, Switzerland

Sport
- Sport: Athletics
- Event: Decathlon

Willy Bührer (24 April 1912 – 11 June 1990) was a Swiss athlete. He competed in the men's decathlon at the 1936 Summer Olympics.
