= Zhou Dawen =

Chinese politician

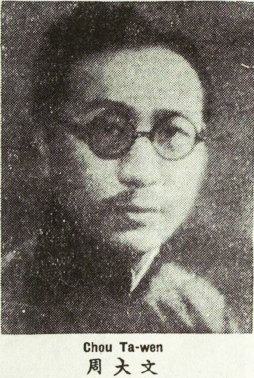

Zhou Dawen (Chinese: 周大文) (1895–1971) was a politician of the Republic of China. He was born in Wuxi, Jiangsu. He was aligned with the Fengtian clique before joining the Nationalist government. He was the 19th mayor of Beijing.

After his political career, he became a famous chef. His children included Olympic athlete Chow Chang Sing (Zhou Changxing) along with Peking opera artists Zhou Changyun and Liu Changyu (born Zhou Changyu).

Preceded by Wang Tao	Mayor of Beijing; 1931–1933	Succeeded by Hu Ruoyu (Anhui)

== Bibliography ==
- 徐友春主編 (2007). 民国人物大辞典 増訂版|和書. 河北人民出版社. ISBN 978-7-202-03014-1.
- 劉国銘主編 (2005). 中国国民党百年人物全書|和書. 団結出版社. ISBN 7-80214-039-0.
- 劉寿林ほか編 (1995). 民国職官年表|和書. Zhonghua Book Company. ISBN 7-101-01320-1.
