= Witold Gerutto =

Polish shot putter and decathlete

Personal information
- Nickname: Mefisto
- Nationality: Polish
- Born: 1 October 1912 Harbin, China
- Died: 13 October 1973 (aged 61) Konstancin-Jeziorna, Poland
- Height: 1.94 m (6 ft 4 in)
- Weight: 90 kg (198 lb)

Sport
- Event: Shot put
- Club: Cresovia Grodno (1930–1934); AZS Vilnius (1935); Warszawianka (1936–1939); BOS (1945); Syrena Warszawa (1946–1948); Ogniwo Warsaw (1949–1952)
Medal record
Men's athletics
Representing Poland
European Championships
Silver medal – second place	1938 Paris	Decathlon

Witold Gerutto (1 October 1912 in Harbin, China – 13 October 1973 in Konstancin) was a Polish shot putter and decathlete who competed in the 1948 Summer Olympics.

He was born in Harbin, China, as his father was working on the Trans-Siberian telephone line. His family returned to newly independent Poland in 1918 and settled in Grodno (modern-day Belarus).

He was a 17-time Polish athletics champion in various events. His biggest success was the silver medal in decathlon at the 1938 European Championships in Paris.

He spent most of World War Two in occupied Warsaw. During the Warsaw Uprising he was sent to the Third Reich to work in a factory. After the war he returned to Warsaw and represented his country in the shot put at the 1948 Summer Olympics finishing tenth.

After his retirement in 1952 he worked as an athletics coach and later as president of Polish Athletics Association (1967–1968).

== International competitions ==
Year	Competition	Venue	Position	Event	Notes
Representing Poland
1938	European Championships	Paris, France	8th	Shot put	14.41 m
1938	European Championships	Paris, France	2nd	Decathlon	6459 pts
1939	International University Games	Monte Carlo, Monaco	2nd	Shot put	14.68 m
1939	International University Games	Monte Carlo, Monaco	3rd	Discus throw	43.92 m
1946	European Championships	Oslo, Norway	9th	Shot put	13.90 m
1946	European Championships	Oslo, Norway	–	Decathlon	DNF
1948	Olympic Games	London, United Kingdom	10th	Shot put	14.37 m
1948	Olympic Games	London, United Kingdom	19th	Decathlon	6106 pts

== Personal bests ==
- 110 metres hurdles – 16.0 seconds (Warsaw 1939)
- High jump – 1.86 metres (Budapest 1935)
- Pole vault – 3.50 metres (Paris 1938)
- Long jump – 6.89 metres (Warsaw 1935)
- Shot put – 16.02 metres (Łódź 1939)
- Discus throw – 45.82 metres (Warsaw 1936)
- Javelin throw (old model) – 60.90 metres (Poznań 1949)
- Decathlon (1934 tables) – 6459 points (Paris 1938) – translating to 7006 points according to 1986 tables.
