= Jack Parker (decathlete) =

American track and field athlete (1915–1964)

Olympic medal record

Men's athletics

Representing the United States
Bronze medal – third place	1936 Berlin	Decathlon

Roger "Jack" Parker (September 27, 1915 – May 29, 1964) was an American track and field athlete who competed mainly in the decathlon.

He competed for the United States in the 1936 Summer Olympics held in Berlin, Germany in the decathlon where he won the bronze medal.

Parker was an all around track and field athlete from Lamoni High School in Lamoni, Iowa. In 1933, Parker fell three points shy of winning the Iowa state high school team championship single-handedly, winning six events at the state finals. He was invited to the National High School Championships held in Chicago, where he placed second in the long jump behind another high school star of his day, Jesse Owens. Parker was recruited to Sacramento City College, where he was coached by L. D. Weldon.

== Bibliography ==
- Evans, Hilary; Gjerde, Arild; Heijmans, Jeroen; Mallon, Bill; et al. "Jack Parker". Olympics at Sports-Reference.com. Sports Reference LLC. Archived from the original on September 20, 2012.
- Biography of Jack Parker
