= Chow Chang Sing =

Chinese decathlete

Personal information
- Nationality: Chinese
- Born: 28 May 1916
- Died: 1994

Sport
- Sport: Athletics
- Event: Decathlon

Chow Chang Sing (Chinese: 周长星; pinyin: Zhōu Chángxīng; 28 May 1916 – 1994) was a Chinese athlete. He competed in the men's decathlon at the 1936 Summer Olympics.

His father was Zhou Dawen.
