= Zygmunt Siedlecki =

Polish decathlete

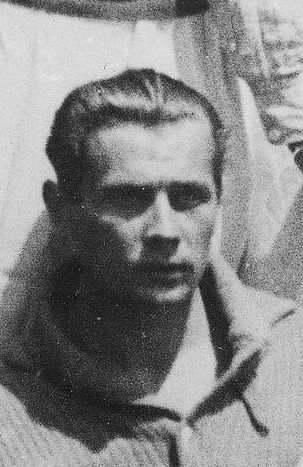
- Siedlecki in 1932

Personal information
- Nationality: Polish
- Born: 4 April 1907 Parachonsk, Russian Empire
- Died: 28 August 1977 (aged 70) Białobrzegi, Poland
- Height: 185 cm (6 ft 1 in)
- Weight: 82 kg (181 lb)

Sport
- Sport: Athletics
- Event: Decathlon

Zygmunt Siedlecki (4 April 1907 – 28 August 1977) was a Polish athlete. He competed in the men's decathlon at the 1932 Summer Olympics.
