= Kristján Vattnes =

Icelandic javelin thrower

Personal information
- Nationality: Icelandic
- Born: 2 September 1916 Vattarnes, Iceland
- Died: 31 December 1992 (aged 76) Reykjavík, Iceland

Sport
- Sport: Athletics
- Event: Javelin throw

Kristján Vattnes (2 September 1916 – 31 December 1992) was an Icelandic athlete. He competed in the men's javelin throw at the 1936 Summer Olympics.
