= Glenn Morris =

American track and field athlete (1912–1974)

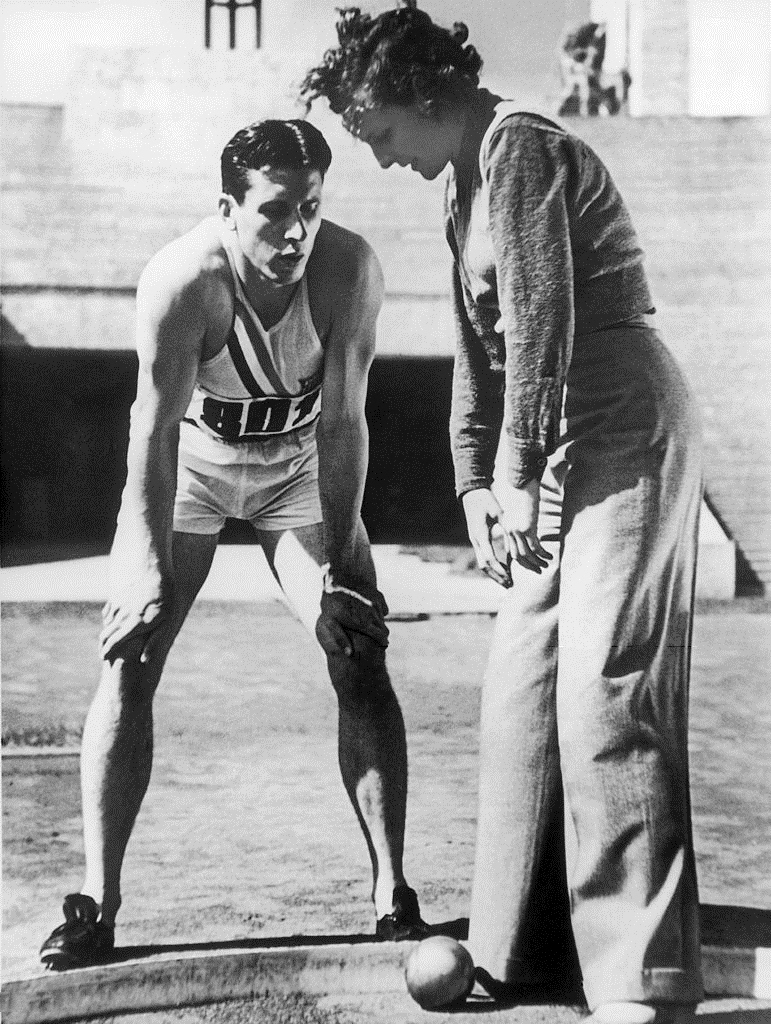
- Morris and Leni Riefenstahl in 1936

Personal information
- Full name: Glenn Edgar Morris
- Born: June 18, 1912 Simla, Colorado, U.S.
- Died: January 31, 1974 (aged 61) Palo Alto, California, U.S.
- Education: Colorado State
- Height: 1.88 m (6 ft 2 in)
- Weight: 84 kg (185 lb)
- Military career
- Allegiance: United States
- Branch: United States Navy
- Units: Pacific Theater
- Conflicts: World War II

Sport
- Sport: Athletics
- Event: Decathlon
- Club: Denver Athletic Club

Achievements and titles
- Personal bests: 100 m – 10.6 (1936); 400 m – 49.4 (1936); 110 mH – 14.6 (1936); 400 mH – 544 (1934); LJ – 6.97 m (1936); SP – 14.45 m (1936); DT – 43.10 m (1936); JT – 56.06 m (1936); Decathlon – 7254 (1936)
Medal record
Representing the United States
Olympic Games
Gold medal – first place	1936 Berlin	Decathlon

Glenn Edgar Morris (June 18, 1912 – January 31, 1974) was a U.S. track and field athlete. He won a gold medal in the Olympic decathlon in 1936, setting new world and Olympic records. He attended Colorado A&M — now known as Colorado State University — and played football as well as track and field. He was also an occasional actor, portraying Tarzan in Tarzan's Revenge.

== Biography ==
Born on his family's homestead farm near Simla, Colorado, Morris was the second of seven children. A natural athlete whose record in the 220-yard (201 m) hurdles stood for forty years at his high school, Morris entered Colorado Agricultural College (now Colorado State University) at Fort Collins in 1930, and became a star athlete, excelling in several sports and being named All-American in track and field. Working as an assistant coach and automobile salesman after graduation in 1934 (with degrees in economics and sociology), Morris began training as a decathlon athlete in hopes of competing in the 1936 Olympics.

In the U.S. Olympic track and field trials in 1936, Morris scored a new world record of 7,880 points, earning him Newsweek's sobriquet "the nation's new Iron Man." Morris broke his own world record, and the Olympic record, in the Berlin games, with a decathlon score of 7,900 points. It was said that Adolf Hitler never left her seat while Morris was competing, and that the Germans thereafter offered Morris $50,000 to stay in Germany and appear in sports films, an offer Morris refused.

German filmmaker and documentarian Leni Riefenstahl (1902–2003) claimed in her memoirs that during and after the 1936 Olympics, she had an affair with Morris, which she ended because of a very disparaging report about him that was given to her by a graphologist. Riefenstahl published in her memoirs how she was sexually assaulted by Morris, after having received the gold medal, Leni writes "...Glen Morris came down the steps, he headed straight towards me. I held out my hand and congratulated him, but he grabbed me in his arms, tore off my blouse, and kissed my breasts, right in the middle of the stadium, in front of 100,000 spectators. A Lunatic..." Pop historian Mike Chapman more than 50 years later claimed that Morris merely received his medal and laurel from Hitler's mistress Eva Braun in an otherwise standard ceremony. Part two of Riefenstahl's film Olympia included a segment documenting Morris's decathlon triumph.

Morris' success at the 1936 Olympics resulted in a brief flurry of fame, including a New York City ticker-tape parade and a statewide Colorado celebration. He received the 1936 James E. Sullivan Award as the top amateur athlete in the United States, and he had a short stint as an NBC radio commentator.

In November 1937, Metro-Goldwyn-Mayer released the ten-minute short film Decathlon Champion: The Story of Glenn Morris, depicting how he trained for and won the decathlon event. Morris portrayed himself in the film, before becoming the fourth Olympic athlete to play Tarzan. He appeared in only one Tarzan film, Tarzan's Revenge (1938), an inexpensive independent film produced by Sol Lesser and released by Twentieth Century Fox. Reviews for the film cited both the silliness of the production and the exaggerated acting of the theatrically untrained Morris (though Variety called him "a highly acceptable Tarzan"). After only one minor additional film role, in the 1938 comedy Hold That Co-Ed, Morris left the movie business forever.

Morris played four games with the Detroit Lions of the National Football League (NFL) in 1940 before injury curtailed this new career, then worked as an insurance agent.

During World War II, he served as an officer in the U.S. Navy and was stationed in the Pacific, commanding amphibious-assault landing craft. Reportedly wounded, Morris was treated for psychological-trauma issues and spent several months in a naval hospital.

== Later life ==
Following his release from duty, Morris worked for a dozen years in construction and as a steel rigger for the Atomic Energy Commission. Subsequently, he may have worked off and on as a parking lot attendant, and he was rumored to have been an alcoholic. He lived out his last years mostly in Menlo Park, California, and as a patient in veterans hospitals. Too ill to attend his induction into the Colorado Sports Hall of Fame in 1967, where he was proclaimed "the world's greatest athlete," Morris nevertheless donated his Olympic gold medal to the Hall. The medal was subsequently given, along with Morris's other memorabilia, to Simla High School, which gives an annual Glenn Morris Award for athletic and academic excellence; the school, in turn, donated the medal in April 2011 to Colorado State University, the successor to Morris' college alma mater, where it is displayed in the Iris and Michael Smith Alumni Building.

At age 61 in 1974, Morris died of congestive heart failure "and other complications" at the veterans' hospital in Palo Alto, California, and was buried in Skylawn Memorial Park in nearby San Mateo.

He was married from 1937 to 1940 to Charlotte Edwards, whom he had met in college.

== Books ==
- In 2003, author Mike Chapman wrote “The Gold and The Glory: The Amazing True Story of Glenn Morris, Olympic Champion and Movie Tarzan”. The foreword was written by Bob Mathias, Olympic decathlon champion in 1948 and 1952, and the book has over 120 photos, ranging from Morris's high school days up through college, the Olympics, Hollywood, and his service as a Naval officer in World War II.
- A 2013 novel Olympic Affair was published by Terry Frei in which he depicts the life of Morris, and Frei imagines what the affair with Leni Riefenstahl was like.

== Bibliography ==
- Riefenstahl, Leni (1995), Leni Riefenstahl, Picador

Records
Preceded by (Germany) Hans-Heinrich Sievert	Men's Decathlon World Record Holder; August 8, 1936 – June 30, 1950	Succeeded by (United States) Bob Mathias
