= Fritz Dällenbach =

Swiss decathlete

Personal information
- Nationality: Swiss
- Born: 25 September 1911

Sport
- Sport: Athletics
- Event: Decathlon

Fritz Dällenbach (born 25 September 1911, date of death unknown) was a Swiss athlete. He competed in the men's decathlon at the 1936 Summer Olympics. His descendants also compete in decathlon.
