= Osvaldo Wenzel =

Chilean decathlete (1911–1991)

Personal information
- Nationality: Chilean
- Born: 25 October 1911
- Died: 26 October 1991 (aged 80)

Sport
- Sport: Athletics
- Event: Decathlon

Osvaldo Wenzel (25 October 1911 – 26 October 1991) was a Chilean athlete. He competed in the men's decathlon at the 1936 Summer Olympics.
