= Bob Clark (athlete) =

American decathlete (1913–1976)

Olympic medal record

Men's athletics

Representing the United States
Silver medal – second place	1936 Berlin	Decathlon

Robert Hyatt Clark (January 28, 1913 – May 13, 1976) was an American athlete who competed mainly in the Decathlon.

Competing for the California Golden Bears track and field team, Clark won the long jump at the 1934 IC4A championships.

He competed for a United States in the 1936 Summer Olympics held in Berlin, Germany in the Decathlon where he won the silver medal.
