= Akilles Järvinen =

Finnish decathlete

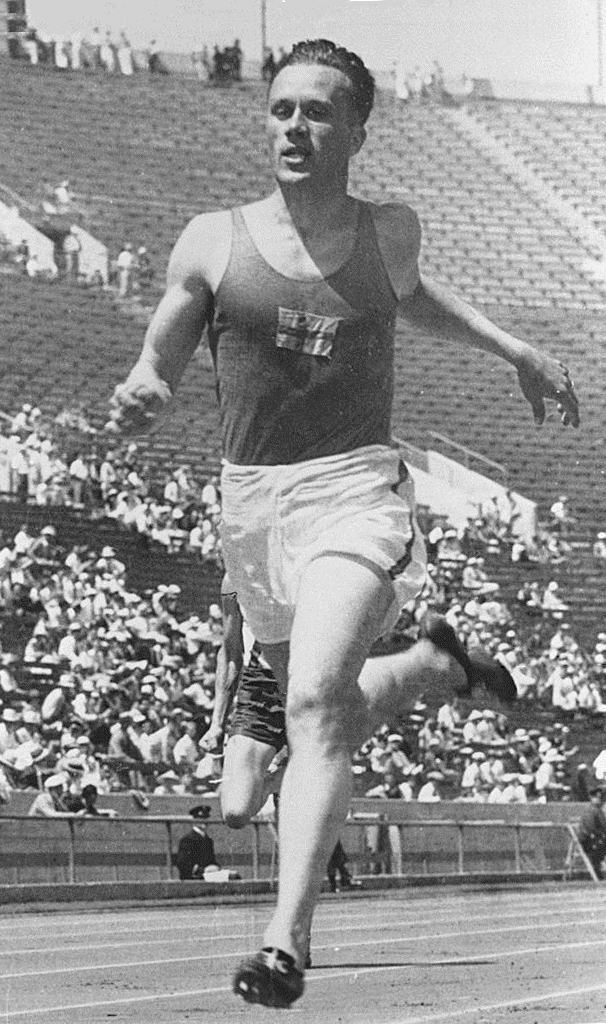
- Akilles Järvinen at the 1932 Olympics

Personal information
- Born: 19 September 1905 Jyväskylä, Grand Duchy of Finland, Russian Empire
- Died: 7 March 1943 (aged 37) Tampere, Finland
- Height: 1.87 m (6 ft 2 in)
- Weight: 86 kg (190 lb)

Sport
- Sport: Athletics
- Club: Tampereen Pyrintö
Medal record
Men's athletics
Representing Finland
Olympic Games
Silver medal – second place	1928 Amsterdam	Decathlon
Silver medal – second place	1932 Los Angeles	Decathlon
European Championships
Silver medal – second place	1934 Turin	400 m hurdles

Akilles "Aki" Eero Johannes Järvinen (19 September 1905 – 7 March 1943) was a Finnish decathlete. He competed at the 1928, 1932 and 1936 Olympics and won two silver medals, in 1928 and 1932; he served as the Finnish flag bearer at all three games. He also won a European silver medal in the 400 m hurdles in 1934.

Järvinen was one of Finland's most versatile athletes of his era. At the national level, his decathlon records are still competitive, and if the current decathlon points tables had been used, Järvinen would have won the gold medal at the 1928 and 1932 Olympics.

Järvinen died in 1943 when his VL Pyry trainer aircraft crashed during a test flight in World War II. His younger brother Matti was an Olympic champion and 10-time world-record breaker in javelin throw. His elder brother Kalle was an Olympic shot putter, whereas their father Verner won one gold and two bronze Olympic medals in the discus throw.

== Personal records ==
- 100 m – 10.9 s (1934)
- 200 m – 21.9 s (1930)
- 400 m – 49.1 s (1931)
- 1500 m – 4:42.0 s (1928)
- 110 m hurdles – 15.2 s (1930)
- 200 m hurdles – 25.4 s (1936)
- 400 m hurdles – 53.7 s (1934)
- High jump – 180 cm (1925)
- Pole vault – 360 cm (1930)
- Long jump – 7.12 m (1930)
- Triple jump – 14.34 m (1926)
- Shot put – 14.10 m (1936)
- Discus – 37.94 m (1931)
- Javelin – 63.25 m (1933)
- Decathlon – 8292 (1932, using 1912 scoring tables)

Records
Preceded by (Finland) Paavo Yrjölä	Men's Decathlon World Record Holder; 20 July 1930 – 6 August 1932	Succeeded by (United States) James Bausch
