= Max Danz =

German middle-distance runner

Personal information
- Nationality: German
- Born: 6 September 1908 Kassel, German Empire
- Died: 20 June 2000 (aged 91) Kassel, Germany

Sport
- Sport: Middle-distance running
- Event: 800 metres
- Club: SCC Berlin

Max Danz (6 September 1908 – 20 June 2000) was a German middle-distance runner. He competed in the men's 800 metres at the 1932 Summer Olympics.

He graduated from University of Marburg as an MD. He worked during World War II in Berlin in various hospitals and was a prisoner of war for a short time. After the war he set up private practice in his native Kassel, from 1952 onward specialized in internal medicine, combined the local sports clubs to form Hessen Kassel, helped to set up the German Athletics Association (DLV) and served as its President from 1949 to 1970. At the same time he was also vice-president of the (West) German National Olympic Committee. After the German athletics team boycotted the 1969 European Championships in Athens, he was forced to resigh. From 1952 to 1981 he was a member of the European Committee of the IAAF.
