= Wolrad Eberle =

German decathlete (1908–1949)

Personal information
- Born: 4 May 1908 Freiburg, German Empire
- Died: 13 May 1949 (aged 41) Cologne, Germany
Medal record
Men's athletics
Representing Germany
Olympic Games
Bronze medal – third place	1932 Los Angeles	Decathlon

Wolrad Eberle (4 May 1908, Freiburg – 13 May 1949, Cologne) was a German decathlete.

He won the bronze medal at the 1932 Summer Olympics held in Los Angeles, California. He won a silver medal at World Student Games in 1933.
