= Ottó Misángyi =

Hungarian sports coach

Ottó Misángyi (Hungarian: [ˈottoː ˈmiʃaːɲɟi]; 20 April 1895 – 30 November 1977) was a Hungarian athletics coach, sports official, university professor and writer.

Born in Pécs, Misángyi was notary in the Hungarian Athletics Association (HAA) before World War I. In the war he was captured and held in custody by the Russians.

He returned to Hungary after the war and managed the athletics department of Ferencvárosi TC. At the creation of the Hungarian Royal College of Physical Education, Misángyi was selected to the three-member Executive Commission. From 1925 he worked as Professor of Athletics and in 1941 he was promoted to director, a position he held until 1945. Beside his duties in the college, he also earned degrees in commerce and law, and served as professional supervisor of the Hungarian Athletics Association between 1921 and 1932, including a brief period when he acted as vice-president of HAA (1929–1932). He was track and field official at four Olympics between 1924 and 1936.

His work was also part of the art competitions at the 1932 Summer Olympics and the 1936 Summer Olympics.

After World War II he left Hungary and settled in St. Gallen, Switzerland, where he worked as athletics coach and instructor. He died there in 1977.

Academic offices
Preceded by Imre Szukováthy	Director of the Hungarian Royal College of Physical Education; 1941–1945	Succeeded by Antal Dollai Dobler
