= Jerzy Pławczyk =

Medal record

Men's athletics

Representing Poland

European Championships
Bronze medal – third place	1934 Turin	Decathlon

Jerzy Pławczyk (16 April 1911 – 16 January 2005) was a Polish athlete who competed at 1932 and 1936 Summer Olympics.

== Biography ==
In 1932 in Los Angeles, he competed in the men's high jump event, where he placed joint-seventh out of fourteen competitors with a top height of 1.90m. In 1936 in Berlin he placed twenty-second and last in the same event with a height of 1.80m. He also finished ninth out of twenty-eight competitors in the decathlon event and set his personal best score. He was born in Dąbrowa Górnicza and was a member of the AZS Warszawa club.

A 1932 graduate of the Central Institute of Physical Education in Warsaw, that same year Pławczyk became the European champion in the high jump with a height of 1.96m, having already been a three-time national record holder in the event. He won a bronze medal in the decathlon event at the 1934 European Athletics Championships in Turin, and placed sixth in the same event at the 1938 European Athletics Championships in Vienna. He was a national champion on numerous occasions in the 1930s. In 1938, he moved to France and joined the army in 1940. From 1943 through 1948 he worked as a sports instructor in Vichy, Paris, and Rome, later working as a salesman and teacher, before returning to Poland.
