= Karl Vilmundarson =

Icelandic decathlete (1909–1983)

Personal information
- Nationality: Icelandic
- Born: 6 December 1909
- Died: 2 June 1983 (aged 73); Reykjavík, Iceland

Sport
- Sport: Athletics
- Event: Decathlon

Karl Vilmundarson (6 December 1909 – 2 June 1983) was an Icelandic athlete. He competed in the men's decathlon at the 1936 Summer Olympics.
