= Maurice Boulanger =

Belgian decathlete

Personal information
- Full name: Maurice Julien Désiré Boulanger
- Nationality: Belgian
- Born: 13 April 1909; Brussels, Belgium

Sport
- Sport: Athletics
- Event: Decathlon

Maurice Boulanger (born 13 April 1909, date of death unknown) was a Belgian athlete. He competed in the men's decathlon at the 1936 Summer Olympics.
