= Paavo Yrjölä =

Finnish decathlete

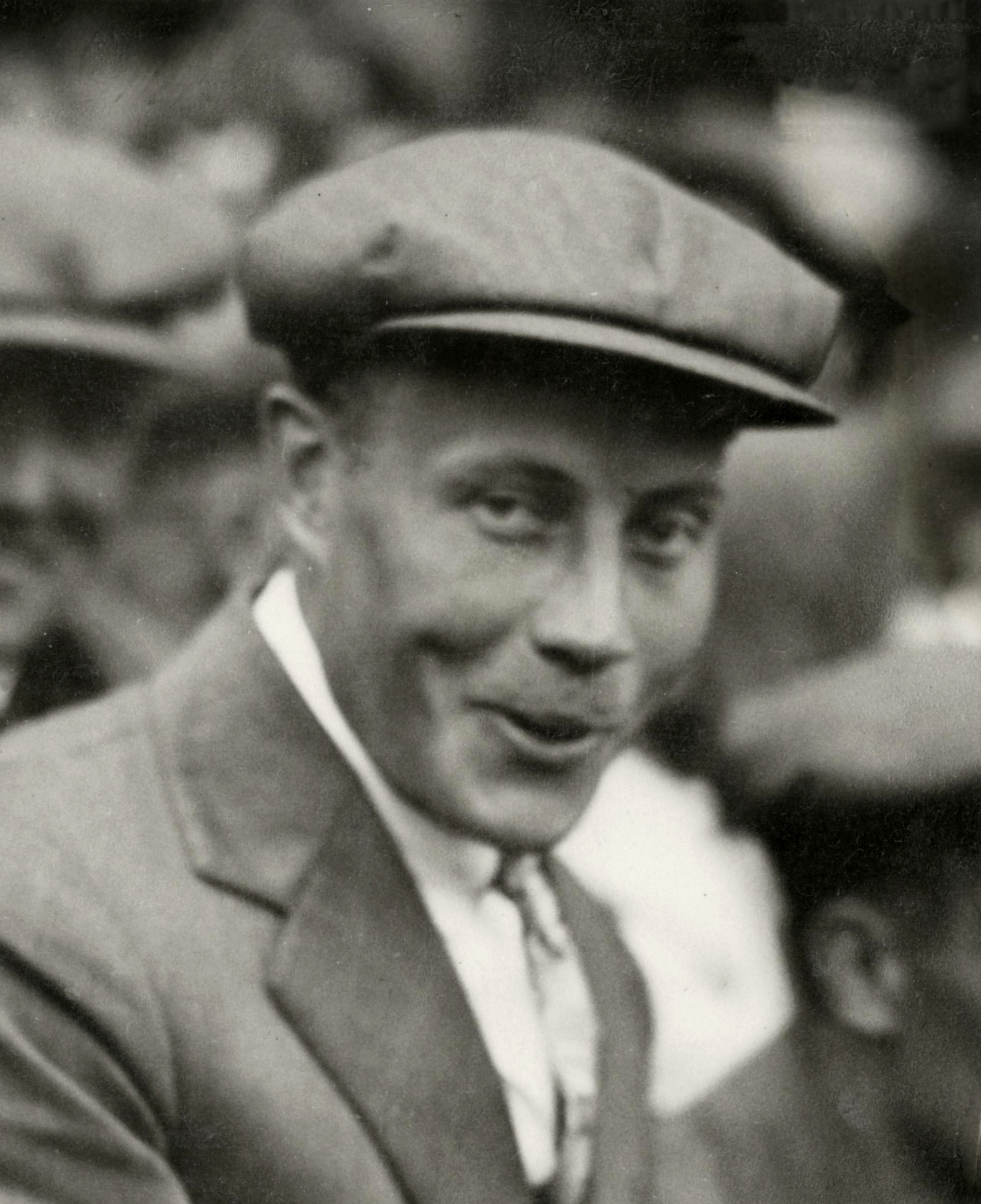
- Yrjölä at the 1928 Olympics

Personal information
- Born: 18 June 1902 Hämeenkyrö, Grand Duchy of Finland, Russian Empire
- Died: 11 February 1980 (aged 77) Hämeenkyrö, Finland
- Height: 1.83 m (6 ft 0 in)
- Weight: 82 kg (181 lb)

Sport
- Sport: Decathlon
- Club: Tampereen Pyrintö
Medal record
Men's athletics
Representing Finland
Olympic Games
Gold medal – first place	1928 Amsterdam	Decathlon

Paavo Ilmari Yrjölä (18 June 1902 in Hämeenkyrö – 11 February 1980 in Vilppula), also known as the Bear of Hämeenkyrö (Hämeenkyrön karhu), was a Finnish track and field athlete who won the gold medal in the decathlon at the 1928 Summer Olympics. He also competed in shot put and high jump at the same Games, and in decathlon in 1924 and 1932, but less successfully.

In the 1928 Olympics, he had to rerun the 100 m hurdles as the fourth hurdle was placed incorrectly in the first run. Finland took the top two spots in the decathlon that year with Yrjölä taking the gold (with a world record) and Akilles Järvinen the silver.

In his years of competing, Yrjölä set three officially ratified world records: 7820 points in 1926 (6460 according to the current scoring tables and with standard manual timing corrections of 0.24 seconds for 100 metres and 110 metre hurdles, 0.14 seconds for 400 metres and nothing for 1500 metres), 7995 points in 1927 (6586) and 8053 in the 1928 Summer Olympics (6587). Yrjölä was the first decathlete to score higher than Jim Thorpe at the 1912 Summer Olympics. Thorpe's performance wasn't officially recognized as a record due to his semi-professional status. Yrjölä set one more record in 1930 of 8117 points (6700), but this wasn't officially ratified.

Athletics was a family affair as his brother, Iivari Yrjölä, competed in the decathlon at the 1924 Olympics, and his son, Matti Yrjölä, was a successful shotputter.

== Major achievements ==
- Ninth in the decathlon at the 1924 Summer Olympics in Paris (5,547 points)
- A gold medal in the decathlon at the 1928 Summer Olympics in Amsterdam (6,587 points)
- Sixth in the decathlon at the 1932 Summer Olympics in Los Angeles (6,385 points)
- Ninth in the shot put at the 1928 Summer Olympics in Amsterdam
- Finnish Champion in 1925, 1926 and 1927

== Records ==
- 100 m: 11.6 s
- long jump: 676
- shot put: 14.72 m (1930)
- high jump: 187 cm (1924)
- 400 m: 51.9
- 110 m hurdles: 15.5
- discus throw: 43.26
- pole vault: 330
- javelin: 62.15
- 1500 m: 4.26:8
- decathlon: 6700 points (8117 with then current scoring tables) in 1930
- pentathlon: 3532 points (4067)

Records
Preceded by (United States) Harold Osborn	Men's Decathlon World Record Holder; 18 July 1926 – 20 July 1930	Succeeded by (Finland) Akilles Järvinen
