= Reindert Brasser =

Dutch athlete

Jan Brasser
Personal information
- Born: 20 November 1912 Amsterdam, Netherlands
- Died: 30 August 1999 (aged 86) Amsterdam, Netherlands

Sport
- Sport: Athletics
- Event: 120 yards hurdles/discus
- Club: AAC, Amsterdam

Reindert Johannes Brasser also known as Jan Brasser (20 November 1912 – 30 August 1999) was a Dutch athlete who competed in the 1936 Summer Olympics.

== Biography ==
Brasser finished second behind Jack Metcalfe in the high jump event at the British 1936 AAA Championships. One month later he was selected to represent the Netherlands at the 1936 Olympic Games held in Berlin.

Brasser won the 120 yards hurdles title at the 1939 AAA Championships before his career was interrupted by World War II.

After the war Brasser won two more British AAA titles at the 1946 AAA Championships and 1947 AAA Championships.

Awards
Preceded by Nel van Balen Blanken	Sauer Cup; 1939	Succeeded by Fanny Blankers-Koen
