= Clyde Coffman =

American decathlete

Personal information
- Born: June 2, 1911 Ford, Kansas, United States
- Died: March 4, 2001 (aged 89) Mesquite, Texas, United States
- Weight: 150 lb (68 kg; 10 st 10 lb)

Sport
- Sport: Athletics
- Event: Decathlon

Clyde Coffman (June 2, 1911 – March 4, 2001) was an American athlete. He competed in the men's decathlon at the 1932 Summer Olympics, where he finished in 7th place.

Coffman was an All-American for the Kansas Jayhawks track and field team, finishing 4th in the pole vault at the 1931 NCAA Track and Field Championships. He was also the national pentathlon champion in 1935. He was inducted into the Kansas Athletics Hall of Fame in 2008.
