= Aulis Reinikka =

Finnish athletics competitor

Personal information
- Nationality: Finnish
- Born: 21 October 1915
- Died: 4 March 1998 (aged 82)

Sport
- Sport: Athletics
- Event: Pole vault

Aulis Reinikka (21 October 1915 – 4 March 1998) was a Finnish athlete. He competed in the men's pole vault and the men's decathlon at the 1936 Summer Olympics.
