= Olle Bexell =

Swedish decathlete (1909–2003)

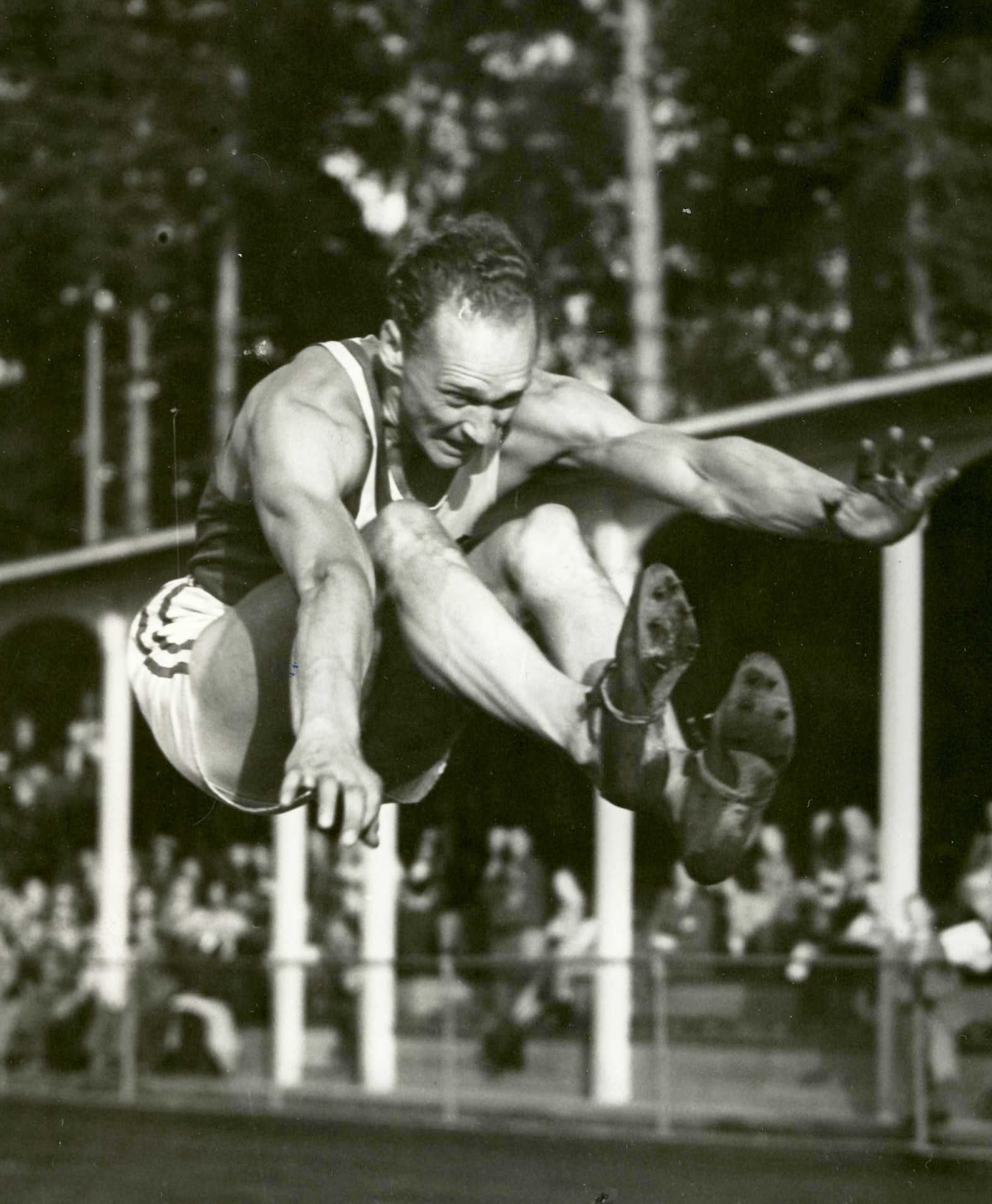

Personal information
- Born: 14 June 1909 Luleå, Sweden
- Died: 6 January 2003 (aged 93) Uppsala, Sweden
- Height: 1.90 m (6 ft 3 in)
- Weight: 84 kg (185 lb)

Sport
- Sport: Athletics
- Event: Decathlon
- Club: IFK Luleå

Achievements and titles
- Personal best: 6781 (1937)
Medal record
Men's athletics
Representing Sweden
European Championships
Gold medal – first place	1938 Paris	Decathlon

Karl Olof Alfred "Olle" Bexel (14 June 1909 – 6 January 2003) was a Swedish decathlete. He finished seventh at the 1936 Summer Olympics and won a European title in 1938. Bexell was Swedish champion in the pentathlon in 1938 and in the decathlon in 1935–38. He held the national decathlon record from 1937 to 1966.
