= Erwin Huber (athlete) =

German decathlete (1907–2003)

Personal information
- Nationality: German
- Born: 5 April 1907 Karlsruhe, German Empire
- Died: 23 May 2003 (aged 96) Munich, Germany

Sport
- Sport: Athletics
- Event: Decathlon

Erwin Huber (5 April 1907 – 23 May 2003) was a German athlete. He competed in the men's decathlon at the 1928 Summer Olympics and the 1936 Summer Olympics.
