= Edvard Natvig =

Norwegian decathlete

Edvard Natvig (16 August 1907 – 6 November 1994) was a Norwegian decathlete. He represented Oslo Politis IL.

He finished tenth at the 1936 Summer Olympics in Berlin with 6,297 points, but never participated in other international events such as the European Championships. His result of 6,297 points (6,298 points with today's points table) was his career best result. He became Norwegian decathlon champion in 1934. In addition he won silver medals at the Norwegian championships in javelin throw in 1933, 1935 and 1938.
