= Leif Dahlgren =

Swedish decathlete

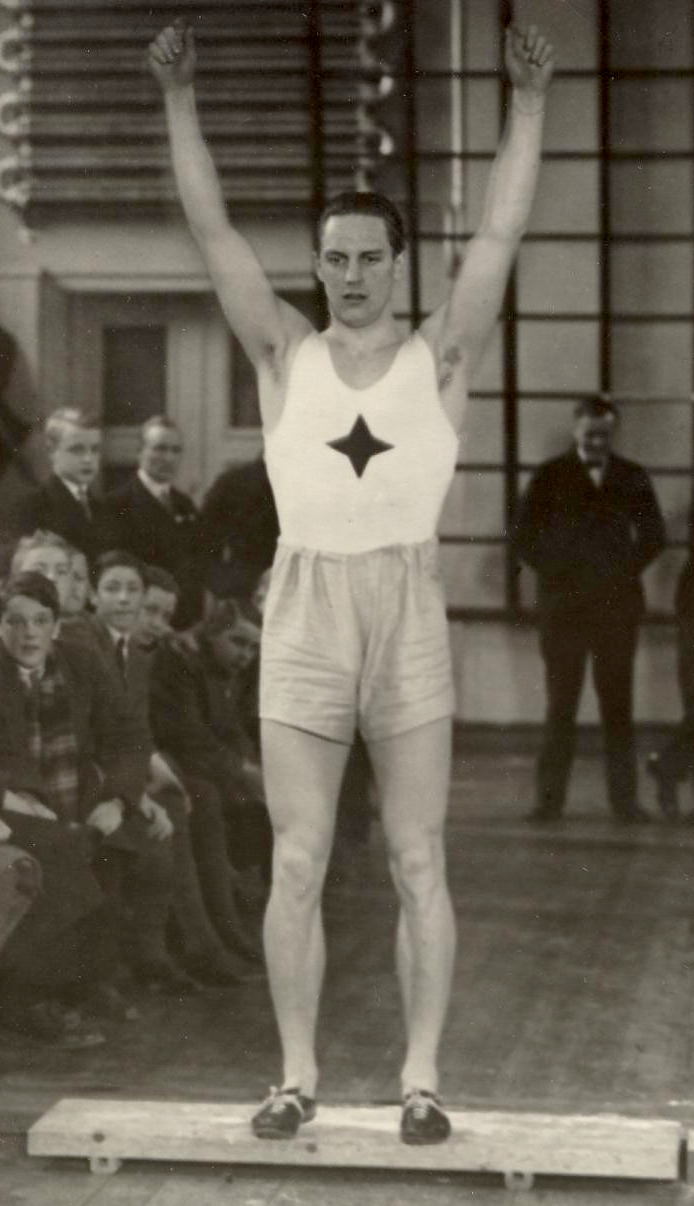

Personal information
- Born: 6 February 1906 Lund, Sweden
- Died: 16 April 1998 (aged 92) Askim, Sweden
- Height: 1.81 m (5 ft 11 in)
- Weight: 76 kg (168 lb)

Sport
- Sport: Athletics
- Event(s): Decathlon, hurdles
- Club: SoIK Hellas

Achievements and titles
- Personal best(s): Dec – 6565 (1933); 400 mH – 54.7 (1935)
Medal record
Men's athletics
Representing Sweden
European Championships
Silver medal – second place	1934 Turin	Decathlon

Leif Evert Dahlgren (6 February 1906 – 16 April 1998) was a Swedish decathlete who won a silver medal at the 1934 European Championships. He competed at the 1936 Summer Olympics, but failed to finish.

Leif was the Swedish champions in pentathlon (1932, 1933, 1935, 1936), decathlon (1931–34), standing long jump (1933 and 1935) and 400 m hurdles (1934) and held the Swedish record in the standing long jump.
