= Wilson Charles =

American decathlete (1908–2006)

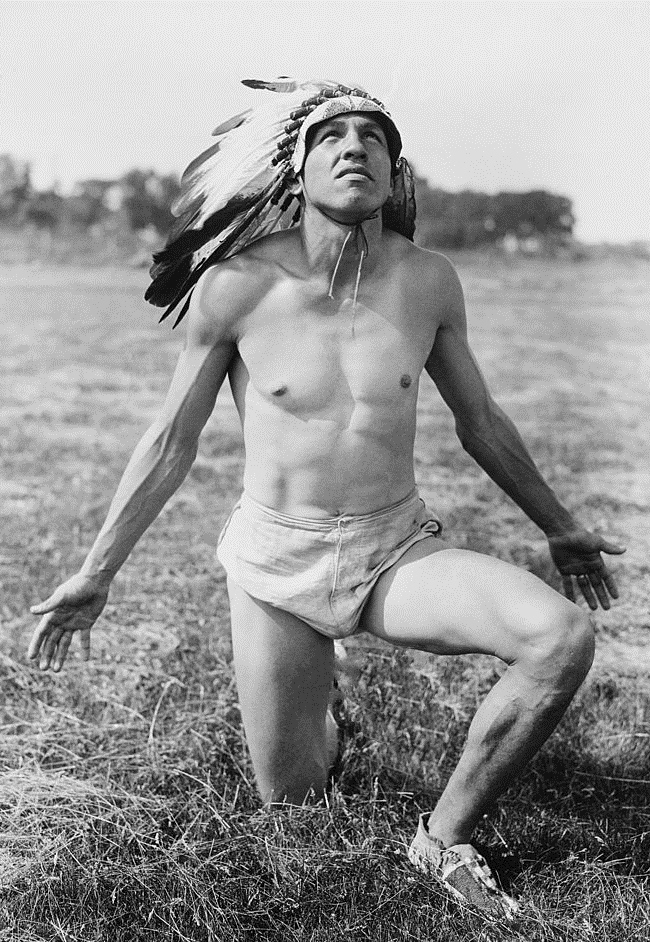
- Wilson Charles in 1932

Personal information
- Born: April 4, 1908 De Pere, Wisconsin, United States
- Died: June 6, 2006 (aged 98) Phoenix, Arizona, United States
- Height: 1.80 m (5 ft 11 in)
- Weight: 78 kg (172 lb)

Sport
- Sport: Athletics
- Events: Long jump, decathlon, 100 m
- Club: Haskell Indian Institute

Achievements and titles
- Personal bests: LJ – 7.24 m (1931); Decathlon – 6901 (1932); 100 m – 10.7 (1929)

Wilson David "Buster" Charles Jr. (April 4, 1908 – June 6, 2006) was a Oneida athlete who finished fourth in the decathlon at the 1932 Summer Olympics. He also competed nationally in basketball and American football. After retiring from sports he worked as an engineer in Phoenix, Arizona. He was inducted into the National Hall of Fame for Famous American Indians.
