= Émile Binet =

Belgian long jumper

Personal information
- Nationality: Belgian
- Born: 27 January 1908
- Died: 26 August 1958 (aged 50)

Sport
- Sport: Athletics
- Event: Long jump

Émile Binet (27 January 1908 – 26 August 1958) was a Belgian athlete. He competed in the men's long jump at the 1936 Summer Olympics.
