= Armin Guhl =

Swiss decathlete

Personal information
- Nationality: Swiss
- Born: 14 September 1907
- Died: 13 November 1981 (aged 74); Steckborn, Switzerland

Sport
- Sport: Athletics
- Event: Decathlon

Armin Guhl (14 September 1907 – 13 November 1981) was a Swiss athlete. He competed in the men's decathlon at the 1936 Summer Olympics.
