= Zsolt Petőváry =

Hungarian water polo player

Personal information
- Nationality: Hungarian
- Born: 15 March 1965 (age 61) Budapest, Hungary

Sport
- Sport: Water polo
Medal record
Representing Hungary
World Championships
Bronze medal – third place	1991 Perth	Team competition

Zsolt Petőváry (born 15 March 1965) is a Hungarian water polo player. He competed at the 1988 Summer Olympics and the 1992 Summer Olympics.

== See also ==
- List of World Aquatics Championships medalists in water polo
