= Ilmari Reinikka =

Finnish high jumper

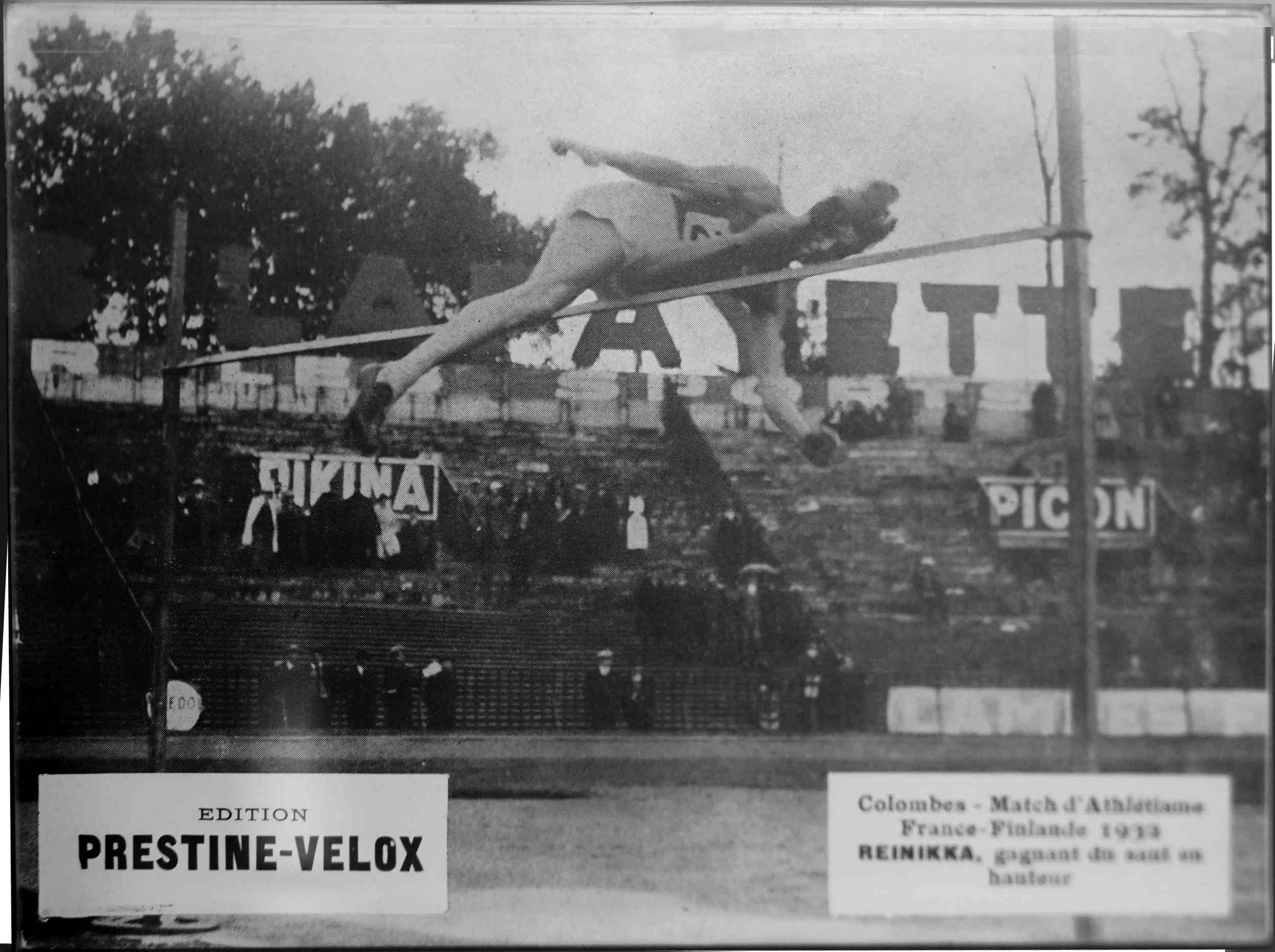
- 1932 Stade Yves-du-Manoir

Personal information
- Nationality: Finnish
- Born: 10 August 1906 Kurikka, Finland
- Died: 31 July 1978 (aged 71) Helsinki, Finland

Sport
- Sport: Athletics
- Event: High jump

Ilmari Reinikka (10 August 1906 – 31 July 1978) was a Finnish athlete. He competed in the men's high jump at the 1932 Summer Olympics.
