= Péter Bácsalmási =

Hungarian athlete

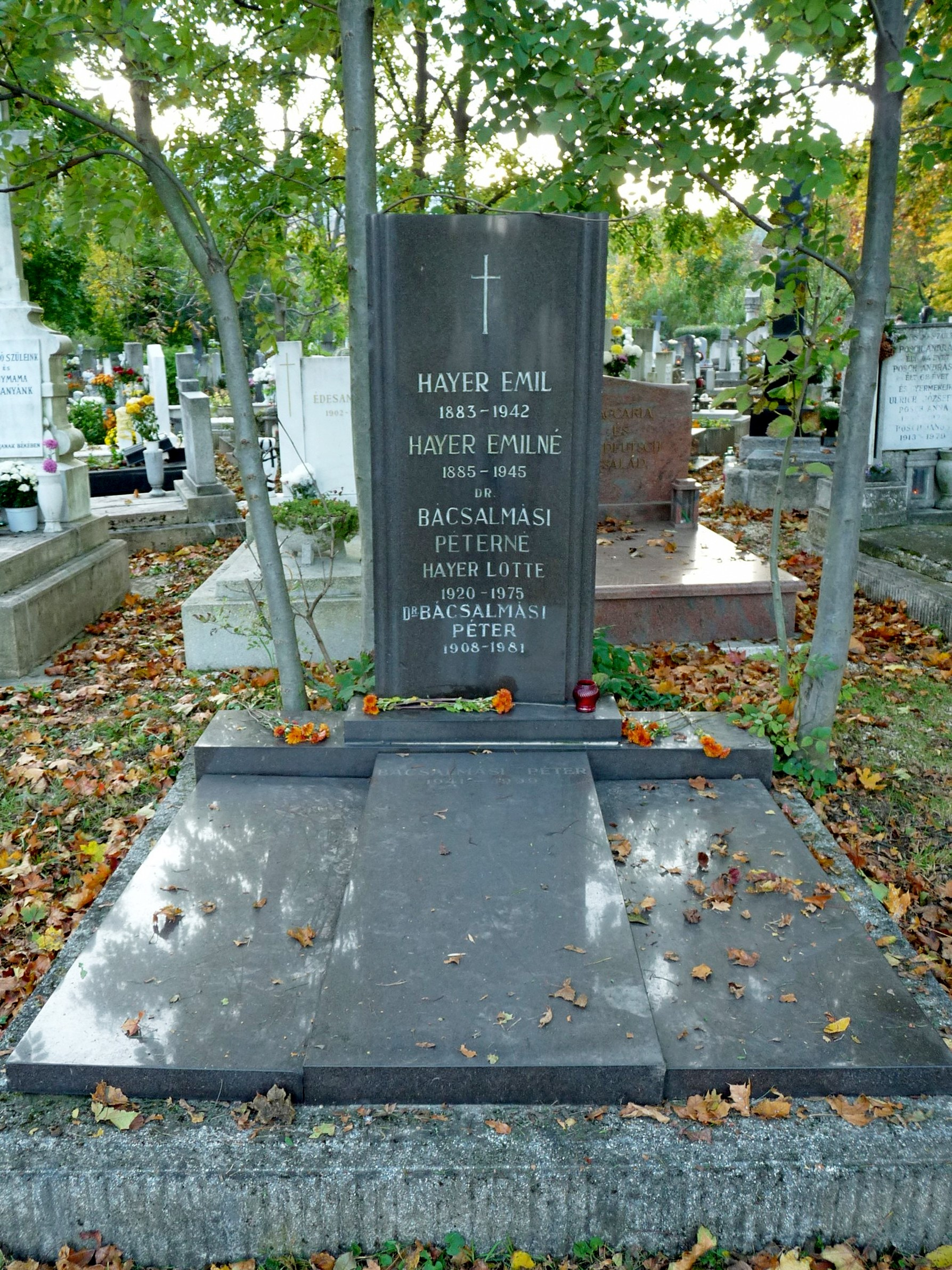

Personal information
- Nationality: Hungarian
- Born: 6 November 1908
- Died: 20 May 1981 (aged 72)

Sport
- Sport: Athletics
- Event: Decathlon

Péter Bácsalmási (6 November 1908 – 20 May 1981) was a Hungarian athlete. He competed at the 1932 Summer Olympics and the 1936 Summer Olympics.
