= Jānis Dimza =

Latvian decathlete

Medal record

Men's athletics

Representing Latvia

International University Games
Silver medal – second place	1930 Darmstadt	Pentathlon

Jānis Dimza (1 November 1906, Ipiķi parish – c. 1942) was a Latvian decathlete. He placed fourth at the European Championships in 1934, and challenged for medals at the Olympic Games in 1932 until he injured himself in the pole vault.

== Career ==
Dimza placed second in the pentathlon at the 1930 International University Games in Darmstadt. The pentathlon had been discontinued as an Olympic event after 1924, so at the 1932 Olympic Games in Los Angeles he only competed in the decathlon. He had scored 7789 points in that event in 1931, and was one of many favorites in what was expected to be a close competition. He was a close fourth after seven events; in the eighth event, pole vault, he cleared 3.50 m to move up to second place, but landed badly and injured his leg. He was unable to continue.

Dimza returned to competition once his leg healed, placing 4th at the 1934 European Championships in Turin. At the 1936 Olympics he again failed to finish, retiring from the competition after the fourth event. In total, he was Latvian champion 36 times in a variety of events. In 1932 he was awarded the Order of the Three Stars 5th Class.

He died in a Soviet prison camp during World War II.
