= Hans-Heinrich Sievert =

German decathlete (1909–1963)

Medal record

Representing Germany

European Championships
| Gold medal – first place | 1934 Turin | Decathlon |

Hans Heinrich Sievert (1 December 1909 – 6 April 1963) was a German Olympic decathlete. He was born in Grittern near Hückelhoven. He competed at the 1932 Summer Olympics and the 1936 Summer Olympics.

In 1934 he became the last decathlon world record holder under the 1915 method of scoring, with 8790.46 points, and won the gold medal at the 1934 European Championships. In the Nazi period in Germany, Sievert was seen as a symbolic hope of the German "master race" in the 1936 Summer Olympics. However, he was injured during the games and the gold medal was won by American Glenn Morris, who also beat Sievert's record. Sievert was recommended to leave the sport after his injury.

In World War II, Sievert became an officer of the German armed forces. In Hungary in 1944, he lost his left foot to a land mine. After the war, Sievert became the chairman of Hamburg's track-and-field event federation and a sport advisor to the German government. He became ill in 1957 and quit his work, moving into the home of his father in Eutin. He married Ruth Hagemann, a fellow athlete that Sievert met while training in the 1930s, and had two daughters who also became athletes. He died in Eutin.
