= Italy at the 1934 European Athletics Championships =

- WA code: ITA

in (Italy) Turin
- Competitors: 41 (only men)
- Medals Ranked 7th: Gold 1 Silver 2 Bronze 2 Total 5

European Athletics Championships appearances (overview)
- 1934; 1938; 1946; 1950; 1954; 1958; 1962; 1966; 1969; 1971; 1974; 1978; 1982; 1986; 1990; 1994; 1998; 2002; 2006; 2010; 2012; 2014; 2016; 2018; 2022; 2024; 2026

Italy competed at the 1934 European Athletics Championships in Turin, Italy, between 7 and 9 September 1934.

== Medalists ==
Medal	Athlete	Event
1st place, gold medalist(s)	Luigi Beccali	Men's 1500 m
2nd place, silver medalist(s)	Mario Lanzi	Men's 800 m
2nd place, silver medalist(s)	Fernando Vandelli	Men's hammer throw
3rd place, bronze medalist(s)	Aurelio Genghini	Men's marathon
3rd place, bronze medalist(s)	Ettore Rivolta	Men's 50 km walk

== Placing table ==
Rank	Team	1. place	2. place	3. place	4. place	5. place	6. place	7. place	8. place	Tot. finalists	Points
3.	Italy (ITA)	1 - 8	2 - 14	2 - 12	4 - 20	3 - 12	9 - 27	4 - 8	2 - 1	27	103

== Top eight ==
Athlete	100 m	200 m	400 m	800 m	1500 m	5000 m	10,000 m	110 m hs	400 m hs	4×100 m relay	4×400 m relay	Marathon	50 km walk	High jump	Pole vault	Long jump	Triple jump	Shot put	Discus throw	Hammer throw	Javelin throw	Decathlon
Orazio Mariani	7																					
Tullio Gonnelli		6																				
Edgardo Toetti		8																				
Ettore Tavernari			4																			
Mario Rabaglino			6																			
Mario Lanzi				2nd place, silver medalist(s)																		
Luigi Beccali					1st place, gold medalist(s)																	
Salvatore Mastroieni						5																
Nello Bartolini						7																
Bruno Betti							6															
Spartaco Morelli							7															
Corrado Valle								5														
Luigi Facelli									6													
Mario Radaelli									7													
Relay team Ulderico Di Blas; Elio Ragni; Mario Larocchi; Edgardo Toetti										4												
Relay team Giacomo Carlini; Angelo Ferrario; Mario Rabaglino; Ettore Tavernari											4											
Aurelio Genghini												3rd place, bronze medalist(s)										
Michele Fanelli												8										
Ettore Rivolta													3rd place, bronze medalist(s)									
Mario Brignoli													4									
Renato Dotti														6								
Danilo Innocenti															6							
Arturo Maffei																5						
Antonio Milanese																	6					
Giorgio Oberweger																			7			
Fernando Vandelli																				3rd place, bronze medalist(s)		
Armando Poggioli																				6		
Mario Agosti																					7	
Gino Ricci																					8	
Eletto Contieri																						7

== Results ==
Athlete	Discipline	PB	Qualifications		Semifinals		Final		Details
Athlete	Discipline	PB	The result	Place	The result	Place	The result	Place	Details
Ulderico Di Blas	100 m		11.1	2. in gr. 3 'KV'	' RN '	5. o of. 2	He did not qualify	9	
Orazio Mariani	100 m		10.9	2. in gr. 2 'KV'	10.9	4. in pf 1	He did not qualify	7	
Tullio Gonnelli	200 m				22.1	3. in of. 2 'KV'	22.0	6	
Edgardo Toetti	200 m				22.1	5. in gr. 2	He did not qualify	8	
Mario Rabaglino	400 m		49.0	2. in gr. 1 'KV'			NZ	6	
Ettore Tavernari	400 m		49.0	2. in gr. 2 'KV'			48.6 'NR'	4	
Mario Lanzi	800 m		1: 51.8 'REP. PB '	1. in gr. 3 'KV'			1: 52.0	2nd place, silver medalist(s)	
Luigi Beccali	1,500 m	3: 49.0	4: 03.2	2. in gr. 1 'KV'			3: 54.6 ' LRS '	1st place, gold medalist(s)	
Umberto Cerati	1,500 m		4: 01.8 'PB'	4. in gr. 2 'KV'			' RN '	10	
Salvatore Mastroieni	5,000 m						15: 00,6 'PB'	5	
Nello Bartolini	5,000 m						15: 26,0 'PB'	7	
Bruno Betti	10,000 m						32: 54.0 'PB'	6	
Spartaco Morelli	10,000 m						3: 46.0 'PB'	7	
Aurelio Genghini	Marathon						2.55: 03,4 'PB'	3rd place, bronze medalist(s)	
Michele Fanelli	Marathon						3.11: 09.4 'PB'	8	
Gianni Caldana	110m hurdles		15.1 'REP. PB '	1. in gr. 2 'KV'	' NZ '		He did not qualify	12	
Corrado Valle	110m hurdles		15.1 'REP. PB '	2. in gr. 3 'KV'	15.0	2. in pf. 2 'KV'	15.1	5	
Luigi Facelli	400m hurdles		57.3	2. in gr. 2 'KV'			' NZ '	6	
Mario Radaelli	400m hurdles		70.0	4. in gr. 1			He did not qualify	7	
Ettore Rivolta	50 km walk						4.54: 05.4 'PB'	3rd place, bronze medalist(s)	
Mario Brignoli	50 km walk						5.01: 52.8 'PB'	4	
Ulderico Di Blas ¹ Elio Ragni; Mario Larocchi; Edgardo Toetti	4 × 100 m						42.0	4	
Giacomo Carlini; Angelo Ferrario; Mario Rabaglino ¹ Ettore Tavernari ¹	4 × 400 m						3: 19.00	4	
Renato Dotti	High Jump						1.85 'PB'	6	
Edgardo Degli Espositi	High Jump						1.70 'PB'	9	
Danilo Innocenti	Pole vault		3.60 'PB'	= 1. in pf. 1 'KV'			3.80	6	
Arturo Maffei	Long Jump						7.12	5	
Francesco Tabai	Long Jump						6.60 'PB'	13	
Antonio Milanese	Triple Jump						14.24 'PB'	6	
Folco Guglielmi	Triple Jump						NM	11	
Angiolo Profeti	Shot put						13.33 'PB'	13	
Giorgio Oberweger	discus throw						45.38	6	
Benvenuto Mignani	discus throw						42.50	12	
Fernando Vandelli	Hammer Throw						48.69	2nd place, silver medalist(s)	
Armando Poggioli	Hammer Throw						46.57	6	
Mario Agosti	Javelin Throw						58.41	7	
Gino Ricci	Javelin Throw						56.63	8	

Decathlon

Athlete	Discipline	100 m	LJ	SP	HJ	400 m	110 hs	DT	PV	JT	1,500 m	The final	Placement
Eletto Contieri	Results	11.6	6.35	11.68	1.75	51.6	17.6	32.66	3.00	48.79	4: 45.2	5,888 (6,846,835)	7
Giovanni Lux	Results	12.0	5.68	12.38	1.65	57.0	17.6	33.58	3.30	52.92	5: 28.0	5,320 (6,368.18)	10

== See also ==
- Italy national athletics team
