= 1933 International University Games =

Multi-sport event in Turin, Italy

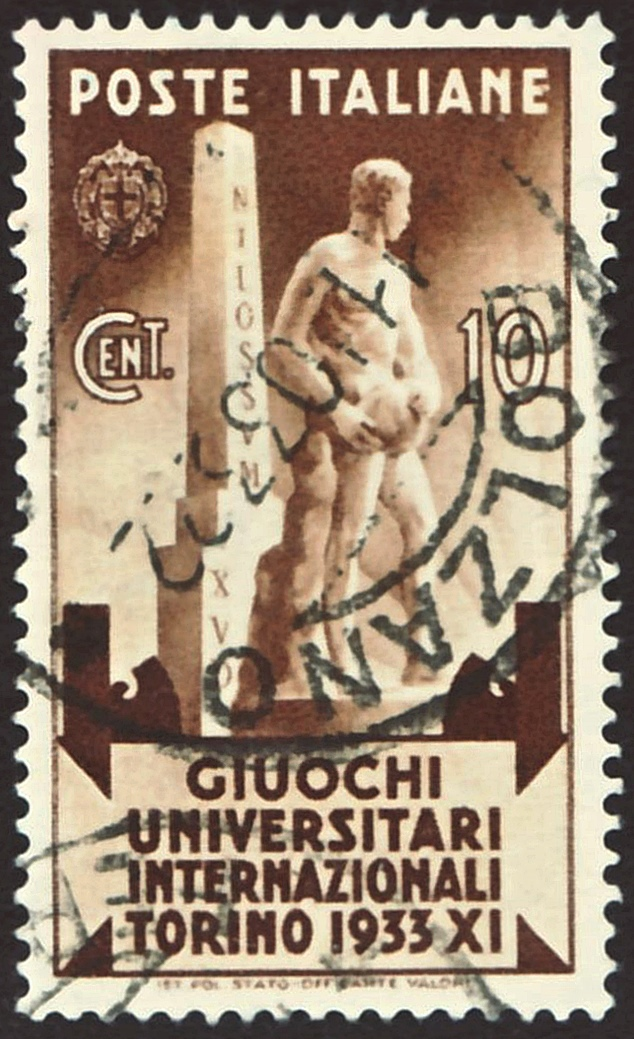
Stamp commemorating the 1933 International University Games, with statue of Benito Mussolini and obelisk.

The 1933 International University Games were organised by the Confederation Internationale des Etudiants (CIE) and held in Turin, Italy. Held from 1–10 September, 27 nations competed in nine sports. Women competed only in the athletics, swimming, fencing, and tennis events (the latter two being debut events for women). This edition marked the first appearance of African athletes at the competition, as South Africa and Egypt sent delegations for the first time.

== Sports ==
- Athletics
- Basketball
- Fencing
- Football
- Rowing
- Rugby union
- Swimming
- Tennis
- Water polo

== Medal summary ==
=== Men ===
Event	Gold		Silver		Bronze	
100 metres	Erhard Pflug (GER)	10.7	Paul Virtanen (FIN)	10.8	Ulderico Di Blas (ITA)	10.9
200 metres	Andrej Engel (TCH)	22.1	Erhard Pflug (GER)	22.2	Angelo Ferrario (ITA)	22.3
400 metres	Ivan Fuqua (USA)	47.8	Harry Voigt (GER)	48.3	Adolf Metzner (GER)	48.5
800 metres	Wolfgang Dessecker (GER)	1:54.6	Max Danz (GER)	1:55.0	Umberto Cerati (ITA)	1:55.6?
1500 metres	Luigi Beccali (ITA)	3:49.2	Jack Lovelock (NZL)	3:49.8	Wolfgang Dessecker (GER)	4:03.0
3000 metres	Umberto Cerati (ITA)	8:43.0	Joe McCluskey (USA)	8:44.2	Josef Hron (TCH)	9:02.8?
110 metres hurdles	John Morriss (USA)	14.4	Erwin Wegner (GER)	14.9	Corrado Valle (ITA)	15.6
400 metres hurdles	Géza Nagy (HUN)	54.7	Ralph Brown (ENG)	54.8	Emilio Mori (ITA)	56.0
4×100 metres relay	Germany (GER); Eugen Eldracher; Erhard Pflug; Wolfgang Vent; Stein	42.0	Italy (ITA); Ulderico Di Blas; Angelo Ferrario; Tullio Gonnelli; Fulvio Gesa	42.6	Czechoslovakia (TCH); Andrej Engel; Karel Kněnický; Ladislav Fišer; Miloš Mečíř	42.7
4×400 metres relay	Germany (GER); Adolf Metzner; Fritz Nottbrock; Harry Voigt; Dietrich Rühle	3:17.6	France (FRA); Raymond Boisset; Paul Faure; Pierre Skawinski; Louis Gaillard	3:19.0	Italy (ITA); Mario Rabaglino; Manfredo Giacomelli; Giuseppe Curtoni; Leo Craighero	3:22.4
1600 metres medley relay	Italy (ITA); Manfredo Giacomelli; Angelo Ferrario; Tullio Gonnelli; Luigi Beccali	3:28.2	Germany (GER); Max Danz; Fritz Nottbrock; Eugen Eldracher; Erhard Pflug	3:31.2	Hungary (HUN); Dezső Boross; Gábor Duha; Ottó Hámori; Mihály Iglói	3:32.6
High jump	Mihály Bodosi (HUN)	1.94	Aksel Kuuse (EST)	1.91	Nils Bergström (SWE)	1.85
Pole vault	Bo Ljungberg (SWE)	3.90	Diego Pajmaevich (ARG)	3.80	Riccardo Galetto (ITA)	3.80
Long jump	Nikolai Küttis (EST)	7.26	Martti Tolamo (FIN)	7.03	Hans-Heinrich Sievert (GER)	6.94
Shot put	Risto Kuntsi (FIN)	15.52	Arnold Viiding (EST)	15.09	Hans-Heinrich Sievert (GER)	14.95
Discus throw	Henri LaBorde (USA)	48.90	Arnold Viiding (EST)	45.40	Hans-Heinrich Sievert (GER)	44.54
Javelin throw	József Várszegi (HUN)	64.85	Gustav Sule (EST)	64.03?	Gottfried Weimann (GER)	64.02
Pentathlon	Hans-Heinrich Sievert (GER)	4163.54	Wolrad Eberle (GER)	3979.51	Martti Tolamo (FIN)	3941.24

=== Women ===
Event	Gold		Silver		Bronze	
100 metres	Ondina Valla (ITA)	12.9	Audrey Brown (ENG)	13.0	Claudia Testoni (ITA)	13.0
80 metres hurdles	Ondina Valla (ITA)	12.2	Claudia Testoni (ITA)	12.6	Rózsi Perjés-Pertich (HUN)	13.0
4 x 100 metres relay	Italy (ITA); Lidia Bongiovanni; Maria Coselli; Claudia Testoni; Ondina Valla	51.5	England (ENG); Audrey Brown; V. Booth; Enid Gillett; Constance Voase	51.9	Latvia (LAT); Erna Eltermane; Alise Gailīte; Alīda Gailīte; Violeta Eversa	54.6
High jump	Ondina Valla (ITA)	1.45	Kathleen Halsall (ENG)	1.40	Violeta Eversa (LAT)	1.40
Long jump	Claudia Testoni (ITA)	5.03	Rózsi Perjés-Pertich (HUN)	4.97	Ondina Valla (ITA)	4.85
Discus throw	Lidia Bongiovanni (ITA)	25.62	V. Booth (ENG)	24.27?	Sybil Ireland (ENG)	22.12
Javelin throw	Margaret Cox (ENG)	29.16	Constance Lee (ENG)	28.81	Maria Cosselli (ITA)	27.81
Basketball	Latvia (LAT); Erna Eltermane; Alise Gailīte; Alma Gailīte; Violeta Eversa; Zigrīda Kūna Ķēze; Johanna Ciekurs		Italy (ITA)		none	

== Athletics medal table ==
Rank	Nation	Gold	Silver	Bronze	Total
1	Italy (ITA)	9	1	9	19
2	Germany (DEU)	4	6	6	16
3	Hungary (HUN)	3	1	2	6
4	United States (USA)	3	1	0	4
5	Estonia (EST)	1	4	0	5
6	Finland (FIN)	1	2	1	4
7	Czechoslovakia (CSK)	1	0	1	2
7	Sweden (SWE)	1	0	1	2
9	England (ENG)	0	5	1	6
10	Argentina (ARG)	0	1	0	1
10	France (FRA)	0	1	0	1
10	New Zealand (NZL)	0	1	0	1
13	Latvia (LAT)	0	0	2	2
Totals (13 entries)		23	23	23	69

== Participating nations ==
- Argentina
- Australia
- Austria
- Belgium
- Bolivia
- Bulgaria
- Canada
- China
- Colombia
- Czechoslovakia
- Denmark
- Egypt
- Estonia
- Finland
- France
- Germany
- Greece
- Hungary
- Italy
- Latvia
- Lithuania
- Luxembourg
- Great Britain
- Netherlands
- New Zealand
- Norway
- Portugal
- Romania
- Spain
- Sweden
- Switzerland
- United States

== See also ==
- FISU World University Games § Precursors
- University and college sport
