= 1934 European Athletics Championships – Men's 4 × 400 metres relay =

Men's 4 × 400 metres relay at the European Athletics Championships

The men's 4 × 400 metres relay at the 1934 European Athletics Championships was held in Turin, Italy, at the Stadio Benito Mussolini on 9 September 1934.

== Medalists ==
Gold	Helmut Hamann; Hans Scheele; Harry Voigt; Adolf Metzner; Germany
Silver	Robert Paul; Georges Guillez; Raymond Boisset; Pierre Skawinski; France
Bronze	Sven Strömberg; Per Pihl; Gustav Ericson; Bertil von Wachenfeldt; Sweden

== Results ==
=== Final ===
9 September

Rank	Nation	Competitors	Time	Notes
1st place, gold medalist(s)	Germany	Helmut Hamann; Hans Scheele; Harry Voigt; Adolf Metzner	3:14.1	CR, NR
2nd place, silver medalist(s)	France	Robert Paul; Georges Guillez; Raymond Boisset; Pierre Skawinski	3:15.6	NR
3rd place, bronze medalist(s)	Sweden	Sven Strömberg; Per Pihl; Gustav Ericson; Bertil von Wachenfeldt	3:16.6	
4	Italy	Giacomo Carlini; Angelo Ferrario; Mario Rabaglino; Ettore Tavernari	3:19.0	

== Participation ==
According to an unofficial count, 16 athletes from 4 countries participated in the event.

- France (4)
- Germany (4)
- Italy (4)
- Sweden (4)
