= 1934 European Athletics Championships – Men's 400 metres =

Men's 400 metres at the European Athletics Championships
- Venue: Stadio Benito Mussolini
- Location: Turin
- Dates: 7 September (heats); 8 September (final)
- Competitors: 13 from 9 nations
- Winning time: 47.9

Medalists
| gold medal | Adolf Metzner | Germany |
| silver medal | Pierre Skawinski | France |
| bronze medal | Bertil von Wachenfeldt | Sweden |

The men's 400 metres at the 1934 European Athletics Championships was held in Turin, Italy, at the Stadio Benito Mussolini on 7 and 8 September 1934.

== Results ==
=== Final ===
8 September

| Rank | Name | Nationality | Time | Notes |
|---|---|---|---|---|
| 1st place, gold medalist(s) | Adolf Metzner | Germany | 47.9 | CR |
| 2nd place, silver medalist(s) | Pierre Skawinski | France | 48.0 | |
| 3rd place, bronze medalist(s) | Bertil von Wachenfeldt | Sweden | 48.0 | NR |
| 4 | Ettore Tavernari | Italy | 48.6 | NR |
| 5 | Raymond Boisset | France | 48.9 | |
| 6 | Mario Rabaglino | Italy | NT | |

=== Heats ===
7 September

==== Heat 1 ====
| Rank | Name | Nationality | Time | Notes |
|---|---|---|---|---|
| 1 | Adolf Metzner | Germany | 48.3 | CR, Q |
| 2 | Mario Rabaglino | Italy | 49.0 | Q |
| 3 | Karel Knenický | Czechoslovakia | 49.1 | NR |
| 4 | Sven Strömberg | Sweden | 49.4 | |

==== Heat 2 ====
| Rank | Name | Nationality | Time | Notes |
|---|---|---|---|---|
| 1 | Raymond Boisset | France | 48.9 | Q |
| 2 | Ettore Tavernari | Italy | 49.0 | Q |
| 3 | László Barsi | Hungary | 49.3 | |
| 4 | Miroslav Hruska | Czechoslovakia | 50.4 | |
| 5 | Vladas Bakunas | Lithuania | NT | |

==== Heat 3 ====
| Rank | Name | Nationality | Time | Notes |
|---|---|---|---|---|
| 1 | Pierre Skawinski | France | 48.5 | Q |
| 2 | Bertil von Wachenfeldt | Sweden | 49.1 | Q |
| 3 | Börje Strandvall | Finland | 49.2 | |
| 4 | Jean Krombach | Luxembourg | 50.2 | |

== Participation ==
According to an unofficial count, 13 athletes from 9 countries participated in the event.

- Czechoslovakia (2)
- Finland (1)
- France (2)
- Germany (1)
- Hungary (1)
- Italy (2)
- Lithuania (1)
- Luxembourg (1)
- Sweden (2)
