= 1934 European Athletics Championships – Men's 10,000 metres =

Men's 10,000 metres at the European Athletics Championships
- Venue: Stadio Benito Mussolini
- Location: Turin
- Dates: 7 September (final)
- Competitors: 9 from 7 nations
- Winning time: 31:02.6

Medalists
gold medal	Ilmari Salminen	Finland
silver medal	Arvo Askola	Finland
bronze medal	Henry Nielsen	Denmark

The men's 10,000 metres at the 1934 European Athletics Championships was held in Turin, Italy, at the Stadio Benito Mussolini on 7 September 1934.

== Results ==
=== Final ===
7 September

Rank	Name	Nationality	Time	Notes
1st place, gold medalist(s)	Ilmari Salminen	Finland	31:02.6	CR
2nd place, silver medalist(s)	Arvo Askola	Finland	31:03.2	
3rd place, bronze medalist(s)	Henry Nielsen	Denmark	31:27.4	
4	Georg Braathe	Norway	32:20.0	
5	Jenő Szilágyi	Hungary	32:23.0	
6	Bruno Betti	Italy	32:54.0	
7	Spartaco Morelli	Italy	33:46.0	
8	Josef Hron	Czechoslovakia	34:02.6	
	Max Syring	Germany	DNF	

== Participation ==
According to an unofficial count, 9 athletes from 7 countries participated in the event.

- Czechoslovakia (1)
- Denmark (1)
- Finland (2)
- Germany (1)
- Hungary (1)
- Italy (2)
- Norway (1)
