= Gustav Sule =

Estonian javelin thrower

Medal record

Men's athletics

Representing Estonia

European Championships
Bronze medal – third place	1934 Turin	Javelin throw

International University Games
Silver medal – second place	1933 Turin	Javelin throw
Bronze medal – third place	1935 Budapest	Javelin throw

Gustav Sule (10 September 1910 – 3 April 1942) was an Estonian javelin thrower. He won bronze in the 1934 European Championships, competed in the 1936 Summer Olympics and at one point ranked second on the all-time world list.

== Biography ==
Sule was born in Tartu on 10 September 1910. In 1928 he set Estonian high school records not only in the javelin, but also high jump and pole vault. Before Sule the Estonian record in the javelin was Aleksander Klumberg's 63.32 from 1921; starting in 1930, Sule broke the record six times officially and twice unofficially. In 1931 he threw 69.54, ranking him second in the world that year behind former world record holder Eino Penttilä.

Sule remained one of the world's top throwers in 1932, improving his Estonian record to 69.62. He would have been a medal contender in the Olympic Games in Los Angeles, but the Estonian Olympic Committee didn't have enough money for the long trip and Sule, like other Estonian athletes such as Arnold Viiding, had to stay home. Sule failed to improve his Estonian record in 1933, but his best throw of 69.30 still ranked him fourth in the world that year. At the 1933 International University Games in Turin he won the silver medal, losing to Hungary's József Várszegi but defeating Germany's Gottfried Weimann, who had placed fourth at the Olympics.

Sule broke through the 70 m barrier in 1934, improving his Estonian record to 71.48 and again placing second on the annual world list. At the inaugural European Championships that summer, also held in Turin, he threw 69.31 and placed third behind the top two from the 1932 Olympics, Finland's Matti Järvinen and Matti Sippala; he was named Estonia's top athlete that year by the Tallinn Sports Press Club.

Sule failed to regain that shape for the next two years, only ranking sixteenth on the world list in 1935 and eleventh in 1936, although he still won a bronze medal at the 1935 International University Games. He competed in the 1936 Summer Olympics in Berlin, but only managed 63.26 and an eleventh place. In 1937 he again broke the Estonian record twice, throwing 72.72 in August and 73.31 in October, and ranked fourth on that year's world list.

Sule set his eventual personal best in Tallinn on 20 June 1938, throwing 75.935 m. At the time, that was enough to place him second on the all-time world list, behind only world record holder Järvinen; Yrjö Nikkanen pushed him down to third when he twice broke the world record later that year, but Sule stayed in the all-time top five until 1953. At the European Championships in September 1938 he threw 70.50 m and placed fourth behind Järvinen, Nikkanen and Várszegi, beating his Estonian teammate Friedrich Issak by one place.

Between 1928 and 1940, Sule was Estonian champion nine times in the javelin and once in the high jump, and won minor medals in the pole vault, shot put, hammer throw and decathlon. Weakened by pneumonia, he died on 3 April 1942 while serving in an NKVD labor column.
