= 1934 European Athletics Championships – Men's 110 metres hurdles =

Men's 110 metres hurdles at the European Athletics Championships
- Venue: Stadio Benito Mussolini
- Location: Turin
- Dates: 7 September (heats & semifinals); 8 September (final)
- Competitors: 17 from 13 nations
- Winning time: 14.8

Medalists
gold medal	József Kovács	Hungary
silver medal	Erwin Wegner	Germany
bronze medal	Holger Albrechtsen	Norway

The men's 110 metres hurdles at the 1934 European Athletics Championships was held in Turin, Italy, at the Stadio Benito Mussolini on 7 and 8 September 1934.

== Results ==
=== Final ===
8 September

Rank	Name	Nationality	Time	Notes
1st place, gold medalist(s)	József Kovács	Hungary	14.8	CR
2nd place, silver medalist(s)	Erwin Wegner	Germany	14.9	
3rd place, bronze medalist(s)	Holger Albrechtsen	Norway	15.0	
4	Willem Kaan	Netherlands	15.0	
5	Corrado Valle	Italy	15.1	
	Ernst Leitner	Austria	DQ	

=== Semi-finals ===
7 September

==== Semi-final 1 ====
Rank	Name	Nationality	Time	Notes
1	József Kovács	Hungary	14.8	CR, Q
2	Willem Kaan	Netherlands	14.9	NR, Q
3	Ernst Leitner	Austria	15.0	Q
4	Sten Pettersson	Sweden	15.1	
5	Vladas Komaras	Lithuania	NT	
	Gianni Caldana	Italy	DNF	

==== Semi-final 2 ====
Rank	Name	Nationality	Time	Notes
1	Erwin Wegner	Germany	14.9	Q
2	Corrado Valle	Italy	15.0	Q
3	Holger Albrechtsen	Norway	15.1	Q
4	Ivo Buratovic	Yugoslavia	15.1	
5	Christos Mantikas	Greece	15.1	
6	Johann Langmayr	Austria	30.0	

=== Heats ===
7 September

==== Heat 1 ====
Rank	Name	Nationality	Time	Notes
1	József Kovács	Hungary	15.2	Q
2	Erwin Wegner	Germany	15.4	Q
3	Ivo Buratovic	Yugoslavia	15.6	Q
4	Paul Mathiotte	France	15.8	

==== Heat 2 ====
Rank	Name	Nationality	Time	Notes
1	Gianni Caldana	Italy	15.1	CR, Q
2	Ernst Leitner	Austria	15.2	Q
3	Sten Pettersson	Sweden	15.3	Q
4	Pierre Bernard	France	15.7	

==== Heat 3 ====
Rank	Name	Nationality	Time	Notes
1	Christos Mantikas	Greece	15.1	CR, Q
2	Corrado Valle	Italy	15.1	CR, Q
3	Willem Kaan	Netherlands	15.1	CR, Q
4	Willi Welscher	Germany	15.4	
5	Ludvík Kománek	Czechoslovakia	15.4	

==== Heat 4 ====
Rank	Name	Nationality	Time	Notes
1	Holger Albrechtsen	Norway	15.8	Q
2	Vladas Komaras	Lithuania	16.6	Q
3	Johann Langmayr	Austria	27.3	Q
	Bengt Sjöstedt	Finland	DNF	

== Participation ==
According to an unofficial count, 17 athletes from 13 countries participated in the event.

- Austria (2)
- Czechoslovakia (1)
- Finland (1)
- France (2)
- Germany (2)
- Greece (1)
- Hungary (1)
- Italy (2)
- Lithuania (1)
- Netherlands (1)
- Norway (1)
- Sweden (1)
- Yugoslavia (1)
