= 1934 European Athletics Championships – Men's 400 metres hurdles =

Men's 400 metres hurdles at the European Athletics Championships
- Venue: Stadio Benito Mussolini
- Location: Turin
- Dates: 8 September (heats); 9 September (final)
- Competitors: 7 from 6 nations
- Winning time: 53.2

Medalists
| gold medal | Hans Scheele | Germany |
| silver medal | Akilles Järvinen | Finland |
| bronze medal | Christos Mantikas | Greece |

The men's 400 metres hurdles at the 1934 European Athletics Championships was held in Turin, Italy, at the Stadio Benito Mussolini on 8 and 9 September 1934.

== Results ==
=== Final ===
9 September

| Rank | Name | Nationality | Time | Notes |
|---|---|---|---|---|
| 1st place, gold medalist(s) | Hans Scheele | Germany | 53.2 | CR, NR |
| 2nd place, silver medalist(s) | Akilles Järvinen | Finland | 53.7 | NR |
| 3rd place, bronze medalist(s) | Christos Mantikas | Greece | 54.9 | NR |
| 4 | Holger Albrechtsen | Norway | 55.0 | |
| 5 | Ernst Leitner | Austria | 55.2 | NR |
| 6 | Luigi Facelli | Italy | NT | |

=== Heats ===
8 September

==== Heat 1 ====
| Rank | Name | Nationality | Time | Notes |
|---|---|---|---|---|
| 1 | Hans Scheele | Germany | 55.4 | CR, Q |
| 2 | Christos Mantikas | Greece | 56.1 | Q |
| 3 | Ernst Leitner | Austria | 56.5 | Q |
| 4 | Mario Radaelli | Italy | 70.0 | |

==== Heat 2 ====
| Rank | Name | Nationality | Time | Notes |
|---|---|---|---|---|
| 1 | Akilles Järvinen | Finland | 57.2 | Q |
| 2 | Luigi Facelli | Italy | 57.3 | Q |
| 3 | Holger Albrechtsen | Norway | 62.7 | Q |

== Participation ==
According to an unofficial count, 7 athletes from 6 countries participated in the event.

- Austria (1)
- Finland (1)
- Germany (1)
- Greece (1)
- Italy (2)
- Norway (1)
