= Henry Nielsen (athlete) =

Danish runner

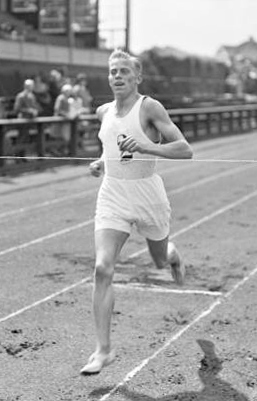
- Nielsen in 1930

Personal information
- Born: 2 October 1910 Nørresundby, Denmark
- Died: 18 November 1969 (aged 59) Hillerød, Denmark

Sport
- Sport: Athletics
- Club: Velo, Nørresundby

Achievements and titles
- Personal bests: 3,000 m: 8:18.3 (1934); 5,000 m: 14:52.6 (1934); 10,000 m: 31:13.3 (1933)
Medal record
Men's athletics
Representing Denmark
European Championships
Bronze medal – third place	1934 Turin	10,000 m

Holger Henry Nielsen (2 October 1910 – 18 November 1969) was a Danish middle- and long-distance runner. Nielsen held the 3000 m world record from 1934 to 1936 and placed third in men's 10,000 metres at the 1934 European Championships.

== Career ==
Early in his career Nielsen trained in Finland, which was the leading distance-running country at the time, and learned from Finnish runners. He won his first Danish championship title at 5000 m in 1930. Nielsen broke the 3000 m world record in Stockholm on 25 July 1934; he faced Poland's Janusz Kusociński, who held the previous record of 8:18.8, and defeated him. Nielsen's winning time was 8:18.3; as a world record, it was officially ratified as 8:18.4, since the IAAF's rules required times at the distance to be rounded up to the next fifth of a second. Later that year, Nielsen won bronze in the 10,000 m at the inaugural European Championships in Turin, losing only to Finland's Ilmari Salminen and Arvo Askola; he was Denmark's only medalist in the meet.

Nielsen competed in the 1936 Summer Olympics in the 5000 m, but failed to qualify from the heats. He was eventually excluded from amateur sports for breaking amateur rules by receiving monetary prizes. His world record was broken by Finland's Gunnar Höckert, who ran 8:14.8 in September 1936.

Records
Preceded by (Poland) Janusz Kusociński	Men's 3000 m world record holder 24 July 1934 – 16 September 1936	Succeeded by (Finland) Gunnar Höckert
