= Roger Rochard =

French long-distance runner

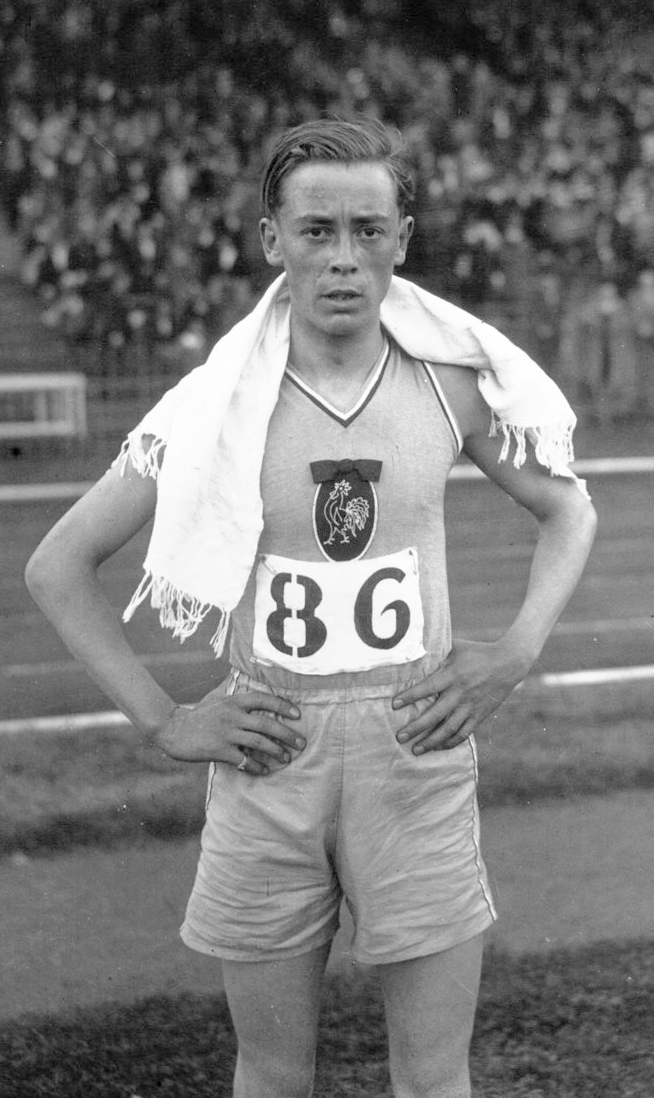
- Roger Rochard in 1931

Personal information
- Nationality: French
- Born: 20 April 1913 Évreux, France
- Died: 24 February 1993 (aged 79)
- Height: 1.71 m (5 ft 7 in)
- Weight: 61 kg (134 lb)

Sport
- Sport: Athletics
- Event: 5000 metres
- Club: Évreux AC

Achievements and titles
- Personal best: 5000 m – 14:36.8 (1934)
Medal record
Men's athletics
Representing France
European Championship
Gold medal – first place	1934 Turin	5000 m

Roger Rochard (20 April 1913 – 24 February 1993) was a French long-distance runner. He was the first French track and field athlete to become a European champion, winning the 5000 metres race at the 1934 European Athletics Championships in Turin, Italy.

== Career ==
As an 18-year-old, Rochard surprisingly won the 5000 m in the 1931 national dual meet between France and Britain, running 15:11.8. Later that summer, he also won in a dual meet against Germany, this time running 15:03.6. His best time that year was 15:01.6, which he ran in Paris on 25 October, but in that race he was defeated by Poland's Janusz Kusociński, who went on to win Olympic gold at 10,000 metres.

In 1932 Rochard broke 15 minutes for the first time, running 14:56.8; he was selected for the Olympic Games in Los Angeles, where he qualified for the final but did not finish it. In 1933 Rochard improved to 14:46.5 in a dual meet against Finland, only narrowly losing to Finland's Olympic medalist Lasse Virtanen.

At the 1934 European Championships in Turin Rochard was up against Kusociński, Virtanen and Ilmari Salminen, but outkicked them all and won gold by a clear 4.4 second margin. His winning time, 14:36.8, was his personal best; he only missed out on the French record, set by Jean Bouin in his duel against Hannes Kolehmainen at the 1912 Summer Olympics, by one-tenth of a second. Rochard was the first French athlete to win gold at the European Athletics Championships, and the only one to do so in the inaugural 1934 meet.

Rochard returned to the Olympics in Berlin in 1936; he again took part in the 5000 m, but was eliminated in the heats. He attempted to defend his European title at the 1938 Championships in Paris, but only placed eighth.
