= 1934 European Athletics Championships – Men's triple jump =

Men's triple jump at the European Athletics Championships

The men's triple jump at the 1934 European Athletics Championships was held in Turin, Italy, at the Stadio Benito Mussolini on 9 September 1934.

== Medalists ==
| Gold | Willem Peters; Netherlands |
| Silver | Eric Svensson; Sweden |
| Bronze | Onni Rajasaari; Finland |

== Results ==
=== Final ===
9 September

| Rank | Name | Nationality | Result | Notes |
|---|---|---|---|---|
| 1st place, gold medalist(s) | Willem Peters | Netherlands | 14.89 | CR |
| 2nd place, silver medalist(s) | Eric Svensson | Sweden | 14.83 | |
| 3rd place, bronze medalist(s) | Onni Rajasaari | Finland | 14.74 | |
| 4 | Edward Luckhaus | Poland | 14.54 | |
| 5 | Toivo Pöyry | Finland | 14.47 | |
| 6 | Antonio Milanese | Italy | 14.24 | |
| 7 | Ingvard Andersen | Denmark | 14.02 | |
| 8 | Bo Ljungberg | Sweden | 14.01 | |
| 9 | Lajos Somló | Hungary | 13.93 | |
| 10 | Sándor Dombóvári | Hungary | 13.91 | |
| | Folco Guglielmi | Italy | NM | |

== Participation ==
According to an unofficial count, 11 athletes from 7 countries participated in the event.

- Denmark (1)
- Finland (2)
- Hungary (2)
- Italy (2)
- Netherlands (1)
- Poland (1)
- Sweden (2)
