= Milanese (surname) =

Milanese is a surname. Notable people with the surname include:

- Alessandro Milanese, Italian motorcycle speedway rider
- Antonio Milanese (1912 – ?), Italian triple jumper
- Concetta Milanese (born 1962), Italian shot putter
- Gaetano Milanesi (1813–1895), Italian art historian
- Marco Milanese (born 1958), Italian archaeologist
- Marco Milanese (footballer) (born 1998), Italian footballer
- Mauro Milanese (born 1971), Italian footballer
- Rob Milanese (born 1980), American football wide receiver
- Tommaso Milanese (born 2002), Italian footballer
- Víctor Milanese Comisso (born 1959), Argentine footballer and manager
