= Mario Agosti =

Italian javelin thrower (1904–1992)

Personal information
- National team: Italy: 16 caps (1928-1937)
- Born: 21 July 1904 Udine, Italy
- Died: 1992 (aged 87–88) Pordenone, Italy

Sport
- Sport: Athletics
- Event: Javelin throw
- Club: A.S. Udine

Achievements and titles
- Personal best: Javelin throw: 65.23 m (1932)

Mario Agosti (21 July 1904 – June 1992) was an Italian javelin thrower, speciality in which he was 7th at the 1934 European Athletics Championships.

Four-time national champion at senior level.

== Biography ==
Agosti was also a footballer. After completing his competitive career in 1937 he was first FIDAL coach, then sports manager and first President of the CONI Provincial Committee of Pordenone, the city where he died in June 1992.

== National records ==
- Javelin throw: 65.23 m ( (Italy) Udine, 3 November 1935) - record holder until 16 September 1950.

== Achievements ==
Year	Competition	Venue	Rank	Event	Time	Notes
1934	European Championships	(Italy) Turin	7th	Javelin throw	58.41 m	

== See also ==
- Men's javelin throw Italian record progression
- Italy at the 1934 European Athletics Championships
