= Albert Jud =

Swiss sprinter

Personal information
- Nationality: Swiss
- Born: 24 January 1912

Sport
- Sport: Sprinting
- Event: 400 metres

Albert Jud (born 24 January 1912) was a Swiss sprinter. He competed in the men's 400 metres at the 1936 Summer Olympics.

== Competition record ==
Year	Competition	Venue	Position	Event	Notes
Representing Switzerland
1934	European Championships	Turin, Italy	5th (sf 1)	100 m	NT
