= 1934 European Athletics Championships – Men's marathon =

Men's marathon at the European Athletics Championships

The men's marathon at the 1934 European Athletics Championships was held in Turin, Italy, on 9 September 1934.

== Medalists ==
Gold	Armas Toivonen; Finland
Silver	Thore Enochsson; Sweden
Bronze	Aurelio Genghini; Italy

== Results ==
=== Final ===
From September 9.

Rank	Name	Nationality	Time	Notes
1st place, gold medalist(s)	Armas Toivonen	Finland	2:52:29.0	CR
2nd place, silver medalist(s)	Thore Enochsson	Sweden	2:54:35.6	
3rd place, bronze medalist(s)	Aurelio Genghini	Italy	2:55:03.4	
4	Jozsef Galambos	Hungary	2:55:14.0	
5	Heinrich Brauch	Germany	2:58:40.2	
6	Hans Wehrli	Switzerland	2:58:45.0	
7	Rudolf Morf	Switzerland	NT	
8	Michele Fanelli	Italy	3:11:09.4	
9	Josef Sulc	Czechoslovakia	NT	
	Frans Vendersteen	Belgium	DNF	
	Franz Tuschek	Austria	DNF	
	Rudolf Wöber	Austria	DNF	
	Josef Bena	Czechoslovakia	DNF	
	Oiva Ekholm	Finland	DNF	
	Paul Gerhardt	Germany	DNF	

== Participation ==
According to an unofficial count, 15 athletes from 9 countries participated in the event.

- Austria (2)
- Belgium (1)
- Czechoslovakia (2)
- Finland (2)
- Germany (2)
- Hungary (1)
- Italy (2)
- Sweden (1)
- Switzerland (2)
