= Eletto Contieri =

Italian decathlete

Personal information
- National team: Italy: 1 cap (1934)
- Born: 1 February 1912 Venice, Kingdom of Italy
- Died: Unknown

Sport
- Sport: Athletics
- Event: Decathlon
- Club: Società Ginnastica Triestina (1934-1937); Pro Patria Oberdan Milano (1939-1943)

Achievements and titles
- Personal best: Decathlon: 6088 pts (1934)

Eletto Contieri (1 February 1912 - ?) was an Italian decathlete, speciality in which he was 8th at the 1934 European Athletics Championships.

Contieri was a three-time national champion at senior level.

== Biography ==
After his career as an athlete, Contieri became a sports manager. On 15 January 1946 he was elected president of the Regional Committee of FIDAL del Friuli-Venezia Giulia and, later, also national councillor during the presidency of Bruno Zauli. At least until 1950, when he moved to Rio de Janeiro for work reasons.

== Achievements ==
Year	Competition	Venue	Rank	Event	Time	Notes
1934	European Championships	(Italy) Turin	7th	Decathlon	5888 pts	

== See also ==
- Italy at the 1934 European Athletics Championships
