= 1934 European Athletics Championships – Men's javelin throw =

Men's javelin throw at the European Athletics Championships

The men's javelin throw at the 1934 European Athletics Championships was held in Turin, Italy, at the Stadio Benito Mussolini on 7 September 1934.

== Medalists ==
Gold	Matti Järvinen; Finland
Silver	Matti Sippala; Finland
Bronze	Gustav Sule; Estonia

== Results ==
=== Final ===
7 September

Rank	Name	Nationality	Result	Notes
1st place, gold medalist(s)	Matti Järvinen	Finland	76.66	WR
2nd place, silver medalist(s)	Matti Sippala	Finland	69.97	
3rd place, bronze medalist(s)	Gustav Sule	Estonia	69.31	
4	Oto Jurģis	Latvia	67.60	
5	József Várszegi	Hungary	65.81	
6	Gottfried Weimann	Germany	65.69	
7	Mario Agosti	Italy	58.41	
8	Gino Ricci	Italy	56.63	

== Participation ==
- Estonia (1)
- Finland (2)
- Germany (1)
- Hungary (1)
- Italy (2)
- Latvia (1)
