= Renato Dotti =

Italian high jumper

Personal information
- National team: Italy: 9 caps (1933-1937)
- Born: 26 August 1914 Arezzo, Italy
- Died: 1984 (aged 69–70) ?

Sport
- Sport: Athletics
- Event: High jump
- Club: Virtus Bologna

Achievements and titles
- Personal best: High jump: 1.92 m (1938)
Medal record
International University Games
Bronze medal – third place	1939 Vienna	High jump

Renato Dotti (26 August 1914 - 1984) was an Italian high jumper who was 6th in the high jump at the 1934 European Athletics Championships, two-time national champion at senior level (1934, 1938).

He also won a bronze medal at the 1939 International University Games (held in Vienna), sponsored by Nazi Germany, the rival games of the 1939 International University Games (held in Monte Carlo).

== National records ==
- High jump: 1.92 m ( (Italy) Bologna, 23 July 1938) - record holder until 18 June 1939.

== Achievements ==
Year	Competition	Venue	Rank	Event	Time	Notes
1934	European Championships	(Italy) Turin	6th	High jump	1.85 m	

== See also ==
- Men's high jump Italian record progression
- Italy at the 1934 European Athletics Championships
