= Erik Svensson =

Swedish athlete

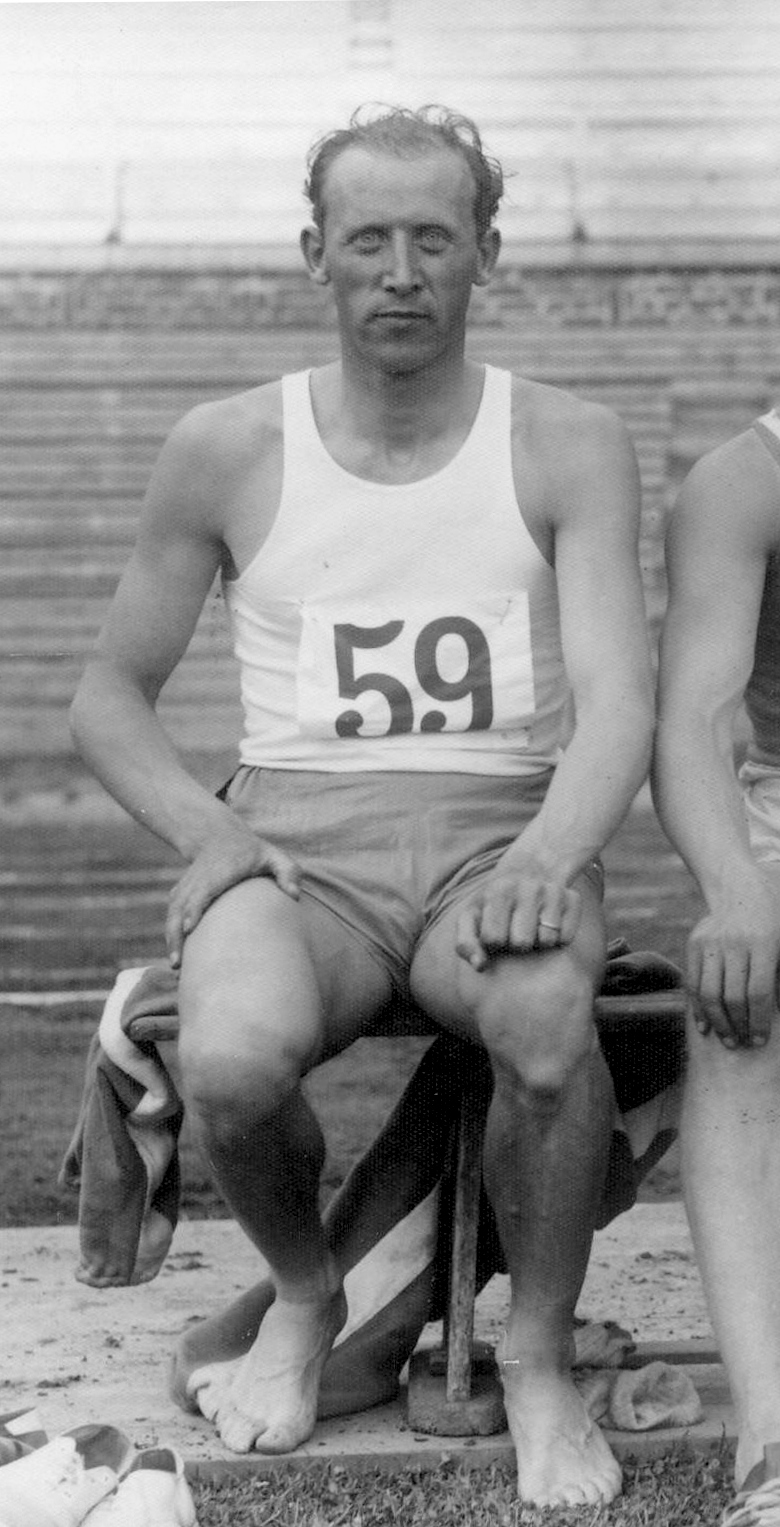

Personal information
- Born: 10 September 1903 Jönköping, Sweden
- Died: 22 September 1986 (aged 83) Falkenberg, Sweden
- Height: 1.84 m (6 ft 0 in)
- Weight: 64 kg (141 lb)

Sport
- Sport: Athletics
- Event(s): Long jump, triple jump
- Club: IK Tord, Jönköping; Falkenbergs IK

Achievements and titles
- Personal best(s): LJ – 7.53 m (1934); TJ – 15.32 m (1932)
Medal record
Representing Sweden
Olympic Games
Silver medal – second place	1932 Los Angeles	Triple jump
European Championships
Silver medal – second place	1934 Turin	Triple jump

Karl Erik Emanuel "Spänst" Svensson (also Eric; 10 September 1903 – 22 September 1986) was a Swedish athlete who specialized in the long jump and triple jump.

== Career ==
In the long jump he finished eighth and fourth at the 1928 and 1932 Olympics, respectively. In the triple jump he won silver medals at the 1932 Olympics and 1934 European Championships.

Nationally Svensson won the long jump and triple jump titles in 1933 and held Swedish records in the triple jump (1931–48) and long jump (1934–59).

Svensson finished second behind Rudi Dobermann in the long jump event and second behind Willem Peters in the triple jump at the British 1927 AAA Championships.
