= Luigi Ricci =

Luigi Ricci may refer to:

- Luigi Ricci (composer) (1805–1859), Italian composer
- Luigi Ricci (vocal coach) (1893–1981), Italian assistant conductor and vocal coach
- Gino Ricci (1910-?), Italian javelin thrower
