= Ulderico Di Blas =

Italian sprinter

Personal information
- National team: Italy: 7 caps (1933–1935)
- Born: 1 March 1907 Gorizia, Italy
- Died: Unknown

Sport
- Sport: Athletics
- Event: sprinting
- Club: Virtus Senago

Achievements and titles
- Personal bests: 100 m: 10.8 (1934); 200 m: 22.7 (1934)
Medal record
International University Games
Bronze medal – third place	1933 Turin	100 m

Ulderico Di Blas (1 March 1907 - ?) was an Italian sprinter bronze medal at the 1933 International University Games.

== Achievements ==
Year	Competition	Venue	Rank	Event	Time	Notes
1934	European Championships	(Italy) Turin	9 (NQ)	100 m	No time	
1934	European Championships	(Italy) Turin	4	4 × 100 m relay	42.0	

== See also ==
- Italy at the 1934 European Athletics Championships
