= Mario Radaelli =

Italian hurdler

Personal information
- National team: Italy: 5 caps (1934–1935)
- Born: 9 September 1912 Novate Milanese, Italy
- Died: Unknown

Sport
- Sport: Athletics
- Event: Hurdling
- Club: Virtus Senago

Achievements and titles
- Personal best: 400 m hs: 56.0 (1934)

Mario Radaelli (9 September 1912 – ?) was an Italian hurdler who was 7th in the 400 m hs at the 1934 European Athletics Championships, one-time national champion at senior level (1934), also in 4x400 m.

== Achievements ==
Year	Competition	Venue	Rank	Event	Time	Notes
1934	European Championships	(Italy) Turin	7	400 m hs	70.0	

== See also ==
- Italy at the 1934 European Athletics Championships
