= 1934 European Athletics Championships – Men's high jump =

Men's high jump at the European Athletics Championships

The men's high jump at the 1934 European Athletics Championships was held in Turin, Italy, at the Stadio Benito Mussolini on 7 September 1934.

== Medalists ==
Gold	Kalevi Kotkas; Finland
Silver	Birger Halvorsen; Norway
Bronze	Veikko Peräsalo; Finland

== Results ==
=== Final ===
7 September

Rank	Name	Nationality	Result	Notes
1st place, gold medalist(s)	Kalevi Kotkas	Finland	2.00	CR
2nd place, silver medalist(s)	Birger Halvorsen	Norway	1.97	NR
3rd place, bronze medalist(s)	Veikko Peräsalo	Finland	1.97	
4	Gustav Weinkötz	Germany	1.94	
5	Wilhelm Ladewig	Germany	1.85	
6	Renato Dotti	Italy	1.85	
7	Vladas Komaras	Lithuania	1.80	
8	Ingvard Andersen	Denmark	1.70	
9	Edgardo Degli Espositi	Italy	1.70	

== Participation ==
According to an unofficial count, 9 athletes from 6 countries participated in the event.

- Denmark (1)
- Finland (2)
- Germany (2)
- Italy (2)
- Lithuania (1)
- Norway (1)
