= Athletics at the 1934 British Empire Games – Women's javelin throw =

Women's javelin throw at the Commonwealth Games

The women's javelin throw event at the 1934 British Empire Games was held on 5 August at the White City Stadium in London, England.

== Results ==
Rank	Name	Nationality	Result	Notes
1st place, gold medalist(s)	Gladys Lunn	England	105 ft 7 1/4 in (32.19 m)	
2nd place, silver medalist(s)	Edith Halstead	England	101 ft 6 1/4 in (30.94 m)	
3rd place, bronze medalist(s)	Margaret Cox	England	98 ft 8 1/4 in (30.08 m)	
4	Louise Fawcett	England	96 ft 1 in (29.29 m)	
	Marjorie Clark	South Africa	DNS	
