= Skawiński =

Skawiński is a surname. Notable people with the surname include:

- Grzegorz Skawiński (born 1954), Polish pop-rock musician
- Pierre Skawinski (1912–2009), French sprinter
