= Jozef Koščak =

Slovak long-distance runner

Personal information
- Nationality: Slovak
- Born: 8 June 1903 Kassa, Austria-Hungary
- Died: 10 January 1979 (aged 75) Brno, Czechoslovakia
- Height: 172 cm (5 ft 8 in)
- Weight: 70 kg (154 lb)

Sport
- Country: Czechoslovakia
- Sport: Long-distance running
- Events: 5000 metres, 10 000 metres, cross country running
- Club: KAC Košice, AC Praha, Slavia Brno

Jozef Koščak (born Jozef Koscsak, also commonly written as Josef Koščák; 8 June 1903 – 10 January 1979) was a Slovak long-distance runner, representing Czechoslovakia. He competed in the men's 5000 metres at the 1928 Summer Olympics. He was the most successful long-distance runner in Czechoslovakia until 1939.

In the 1950s, Koščak was imprisoned for five years on false charges of treason and espionage; he was eventually cleared of all charges.

== International competitions ==
Year	Competition	Venue	Position	Event	Notes
Representing Czechoslovakia
1928	Olympic Games	Amsterdam, Netherlands	8th (sf 2)	5000m	15:42.0
1934	European Championships	Turin, Italy	13th	5000m	16:10.0

== National titles ==
Czechoslovak Athletics Championships

- 1924 Prague: (silver) (5000 m, 16:32.6)
- 1924 Prague: (silver) (10 000 m, 35:15.4)
- 1925 Prague: (silver) (5000 m, 16:32.2)
- 1925 Prague: (gold) (10 000 m, 34:22.0)
- 1927 Brno: (gold) (5000 m, 16:19.2)
- 1927 Brno: (silver) (10 000 m, 34:34.6)
- 1928 Prague: (gold) (5000 m, 15:39.3)
- 1929 Prague: (gold) (High jump, 188 cm NR)
