= Julije Bauer =

Yugoslav sprinter

Personal information
- Nationality: Yugoslav
- Born: 9 October 1908 Pančevo, Austria-Hungary
- Died: March 1945 (aged 36) Kačarevo, Yugoslavia

Sport
- Sport: Sprinting
- Event: 100 metres

Julije Bauer (9 October 1908 – March 1945) was a Yugoslav sprinter. He competed in the men's 100 metres at the 1936 Summer Olympics. He was killed in action during World War II.

== Competition record ==
Year	Competition	Venue	Position	Event	Notes
Representing Yugoslavia
1934	European Championships	Turin, Italy	4th (sf 2)	100 m	NT
