= Gottfried Weimann =

German javelin thrower

Medal record

Men's athletics

Representing Germany

International University Games
Bronze medal – third place	1930 Darmstadt	Javelin throw
Bronze medal – third place	1933 Turin	Javelin throw

Gottfried Weimann (16 September 1907 – 13 March 1990) was a German javelin thrower. He placed fourth at the Olympic Games in 1932 and ninth in 1936.

== Career ==
Weimann was one of the world's top javelin throwers by 1930, when he threw 66.97 m. He placed third behind two Finns at that year's International University Games in Darmstadt with 64.24. Ahead of the 1932 Summer Olympics in Los Angeles he threw 69.54 in Leipzig and entered the Olympics as the main challenger to Finland's javelin supremacy, as the other top non-Finnish thrower, Estonia's Gustav Sule, was not competing.

At the Olympics he threw 68.18 in round one, a new Olympic record; however, Finland's world record holder Matti Järvinen reached 71.25 later in the same round. For much of the competition Weimann was second behind Järvinen, but the other Finns, Eino Penttilä and Matti Sippala, passed him in rounds five and six, leaving Weimann in fourth and out of the podium.

Weimann won another bronze medal at the International University Games in Turin in 1933, missing out to Hungary's József Várszegi and Sule. Later that year he reached his eventual personal best, 73.40, in Gdańsk; at the time, that distance placed him second in the world, behind only Järvinen. He placed sixth at the inaugural European Championships in 1934 and remained in shape for another two years, throwing 72.24 in July 1936, but at the 1936 Olympics in Berlin he only managed 63.58 and placed ninth.
