= Salvatore Mastroieni =

Italian long-distance runner

Personal information
- Nationality: Italian
- Born: 5 March 1914 San Alessio Siculo
- Died: 25 August 1996 (aged 82)

Sport
- Country: Italy
- Sport: Athletics
- Event: Long-distance running

Salvatore Mastroieni (5 March 1914 – 25 August 1996) was an Italian long-distance runner. He competed at the 1934 European Athletics Championships in the Men's 5000 metres and finished 5th. He was national champion in the 5000 metres that year. Two years later, he competed in the same event at the 1936 Summer Olympics in Berlin but finished 6th in Heat 3, narrowly missing the cut.
