= Ernst Gadermann =

German physician (1913–1973)

Dr. med. Ernst Gadermann
- Born: 25 December 1913; Wuppertal, German Empire
- Died: 26 November 1973 (aged 59); Hamburg, West Germany
- Military career
- Allegiance: Nazi Germany
- Branch: Luftwaffe
- Rank: Oberstabsarzt
- Units: StG 2, SG 2
- Conflicts: World War II
- Awards: Knight's Cross of the Iron Cross
- Other work: Professor of Cardiology

Ernst Gadermann (25 December 1913 – 26 November 1973) was a German physician in the Wehrmacht of Nazi Germany during World War II. He was a recipient of the Knight's Cross of the Iron Cross. After World War II he became a well known cardiologist.

== Military career ==
Gadermann joined the Luftwaffe in 1941, where he worked as a doctor in Sturzkampfgeschwader 2 "Immelmann" on the Eastern Front. In addition to his medical work, he was quickly coopted to the wing staff.

Later he became an observer and gunner in the III. Group. During World War II he flew more than 850 combat missions in Junkers Ju 87 (Stuka) aircraft as a rear gunner. From May 1944 until 8 February 1945, he flew with the most decorated German serviceman of the war, Hans-Ulrich Rudel. On this last mission, a 40 mm shell hit their Ju 87. Rudel was badly wounded in the right foot and crash landed inside German lines. Gadermann saved Rudel's life by pulling him from the severely damaged Ju 87 and stemming the bleeding. Later, Rudel's leg was amputated below the knee. Gadermann served the remainder of the war in a Medical Observation Center in Brunswick.

Awards

- Iron Cross (1939) 2nd and 1st class
- German Cross in Gold on 17 October 1943 as Stabsarzt (military doctor) in the III./Sturzkampfgeschwader 2
- Knight's Cross of the Iron Cross on 19 August 1944 as Stabsarzt and Gruppenarzt of the III./Sturzkampfgeschwader 2

== Later life ==
After the war Gadermann worked as heart and circulatory specialist in Hamburg. There in 1947 he and Adolf Metzner developed the basics of the first telemetric measurements of the ECG in athletes. Gadermann was chief of the 1972 Summer Olympics sports medicine faculty. He died of a heart attack on 26 November 1973 in Hamburg on his way to a lecture.
