= Robert Paul (athlete) =

French sprinter

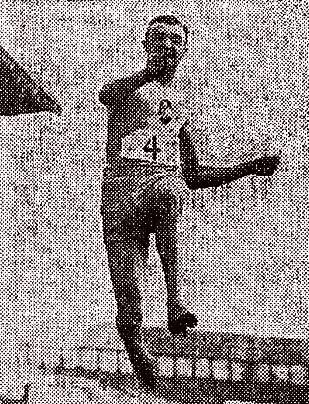
- Paul breaks the French long jump record with 7m50 (October 1932, France-Finland match at Colombes)

Personal information
- Nationality: French
- Born: 20 April 1910 Facture-Biganos, Gironde, France
- Died: 15 December 1998 (aged 88) Pessac, Gironde, France
- Height: 170 cm (5 ft 7 in)
- Weight: 65 kg (143 lb)

Sport
- Sport: Sprinting
- Event: 100 metres
- Club: Racing Club de France, Paris
Medal record
Men's athletics
Representing France
European Championships
Silver medal – second place	1934 Turin	4×400 m

Robert Jean Paul (20 April 1910 – 15 December 1998) was a French sprinter who competed at the 1936 Summer Olympics.

== Biography ==
Paul won the British AAA Championships title in the long jump event at the 1934 AAA Championships, and the 1935 AAA Championships.

At the 1936 Olympic Games in Berlin, Paul competed in the men's 100 metres.

== Competition record ==
Year	Competition	Venue	Position	Event	Notes
Representing France
1934	European Championships	Turin, Italy	6th (sf 2)	100 m	11.0
