= 3000 metres world record progression =

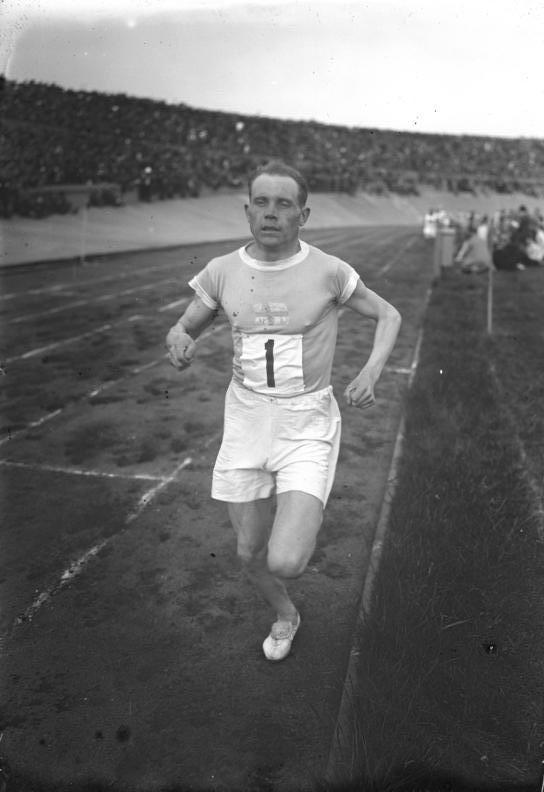
Paavo Nurmi setting a 3,000 m world record in Berlin in 1926

The following tables shows the world record progression in the men's and women's 3000 metres.

World Athletics (formerly known as the IAAF) ratified its first world record in the event in 1912.

== Key ==
Awaiting ratification

== Men ==
=== Outdoor ===
From 1912–2025, 27 world records have been ratified by World Athletics outdoors in the event. The current world record holder is Jakob Ingebrigtsen of Norway, with his time of 7:17.55 set in 2024.

==== Pre-IAAF era, to 1912 ====
Time	Athlete	Date	Place
9:02.4	Louis de Fleurac (FRA)	19 June 1904	Paris, France
8:55.0	Edward Dahl (SWE)	27 October 1907	Norrköping, Sweden
8:54.0	John Svanberg (SWE)	21 August 1908	Stockholm, Sweden
8:49.6	Jean Bouin (FRA)	11 June 1911	Colombes, France
8:48.5	Hannes Kolehmainen (FIN)	24 September 1911	Oulunkylä, Finland
8:46.6	Bror Fock (SWE)	24 May 1912	Stockholm, Sweden

==== IAAF era, from 1912 ====
Time	Athlete	Date	Place
8:36.8	Hannes Kolehmainen (FIN)	12 July 1912	Stockholm, Sweden
8:33.2	John Zander (SWE)	7 August 1918	Stockholm, Sweden
8:28.6	Paavo Nurmi (FIN)	27 August 1922	Turku, Finland
8:27.6	Edvin Wide (SWE)	7 June 1925	Halmstad, Sweden
8:25.4	Paavo Nurmi (FIN)	24 May 1926	Berlin, Germany
8:20.4	Paavo Nurmi (FIN)	13 July 1926	Stockholm, Sweden
8:18.8	Janusz Kusociński (POL)	19 June 1932	Antwerp, Belgium
8:18.4	Henry Nielsen (DEN)	24 July 1934	Stockholm, Sweden
8:14.8	Gunnar Höckert (FIN)	16 September 1936	Stockholm, Sweden
8:09.0	Henry Kälarne (SWE)	14 August 1940	Stockholm, Sweden
8:01.2	Gunder Hägg (SWE)	28 August 1942	Stockholm, Sweden
7:58.8	Gaston Reiff (BEL)	12 August 1949	Gävle, Sweden
7:55.6	Sándor Iharos (HUN)	14 May 1955	Budapest, Hungary
7:55.6	Gordon Pirie (ENG)	22 June 1956	Trondheim, Norway
7:52.8	Gordon Pirie (ENG)	4 September 1956	Malmö, Sweden
7:49.2	Michel Jazy (FRA)	27 June 1962	Saint-Maur-des-Fossés, France
7:49.0+	Michel Jazy (FRA)	23 June 1965	Melun, France
7:46.0	Siegfried Herrmann (GDR)	5 August 1965	Erfurt, East Germany
7:39.6	Kipchoge Keino (KEN)	27 August 1965	Helsingborg, Sweden
7:37.6	Emiel Puttemans (BEL)	14 September 1972	Aarhus, Denmark
7:35.2	Brendan Foster (GBR)	3 August 1974	Gateshead, England
7:32.1	Henry Rono (KEN)	27 June 1978	Oslo, Norway
7:29.45	Saïd Aouita (MAR)	20 August 1989	Cologne, West Germany
7:28.96	Moses Kiptanui (KEN)	16 August 1992	Cologne, Germany
7:25.11	Noureddine Morceli (ALG)	2 August 1994	Monte Carlo, Monaco
7:20.67	Daniel Komen (KEN)	1 September 1996	Rieti, Italy
7:17.55	Jakob Ingebrigtsen (NOR)	25 August 2024	Chorzów, Poland

(+) – indicates en route time during longer race.

Auto times to the hundredth of a second were accepted by the IAAF for events up to and including 10,000 m from 1981.

=== Indoor ===
From 1973–2025, World Athletics has ratified 7 world records in the event indoors for men. The current short track world record of 7:22.91 by Grant Fisher has not yet been ratified.

Time	Athlete	Date	Place
7:39.2h	Emiel Puttemans (BEL)	18 February 1973	Berlin, Germany
7:37.51	Moses Kiptanui (KEN)	20 February 1992	Seville, Spain
7:35.15	Moses Kiptanui (KEN)	12 February 1995	Ghent, Belgium
7:30.72	Haile Gebrselassie (ETH)	4 February 1996	Stuttgart, Germany
7:26.15	Haile Gebrselassie (ETH)	25 January 1998	Karlsruhe, Germany
7:24.90	Daniel Komen (KEN)	6 February 1998	Budapest, Hungary
7:23.81	Lamecha Girma (ETH)	15 February 2023	Liévin, France
7:22.91	Grant Fisher (USA)	8 February 2025	New York City, United States

== Women ==
=== Outdoor ===
The first record officially recognised by World Athletics (formerly the IAAF) was set on 6 July 1974 by Lyudmila Bragina from the Soviet Union.

As of June 21, 2009, the IAAF has ratified nine world records in the outdoor event.

==== Pre-IAAF, to 1974 ====
A "+" sign indicates the mark was set en route to a longer race (typically two miles).

Time	Athlete	Date	Place
14:44.4	Ana Cicanei (ROM)	1927	—
10:56.0	Phyllis Perkins (GBR)	22 May 1954	London, United Kingdom
10:55.2	Phyllis Perkins (GBR)	25 June 1955	London, United Kingdom
10:25.8	Leila Buckland (GBR)	27 August 1955	London, United Kingdom
10:16.2	June Bridgland (GBR)	25 August 1956	London, United Kingdom
10:16.0	Phyllis Perkins (GBR)	27 October 1956	London, United Kingdom
9:44.0 +	Roberta Picco (CAN)	23 July 1966	Don Mills, Canada
9:42.8 +	Paola Pigni (ITA)	11 May 1969	Formia, Italy
9:38.0 +	Paola Pigni (ITA)	2 September 1969	Milan, Italy
9:26.9 +	Doris Brown (USA)	10 July 1971	Bakersfield, United States
9:23.4	Joyce Smith (GBR)	16 July 1971	London, United Kingdom
9:09.2	Paola Pigni (ITA)	11 May 1972	Formia, Italy
8:53.0	Lyudmila Bragina (URS)	12 August 1972	Moscow, Soviet Union

==== IAAF era, from 1974 ====
Time	Athlete	Date	Place
8:52.8*	Lyudmila Bragina (URS)	6 July 1974	Durham, United States
8:46.6	Grete Andersen-Waitz (NOR)	24 June 1975	Oslo, Norway
8:45.4	Grete Waitz (NOR)	21 June 1976	Oslo, Norway
8:27.2*	Lyudmila Bragina (URS)	7 August 1976	College Park, United States
8:26.78	Svetlana Ulmasova (URS)	25 July 1982	Kiev, Soviet Union
8:22.62	Tatyana Kazankina (URS)	26 August 1984	Leningrad, Soviet Union
8:22.06	Zhang Linli (CHN)	12 September 1993	Beijing, PR China
8:12.19	Wang Junxia (CHN)	12 September 1993	Beijing, PR China
8:06.11	Wang Junxia (CHN)	13 September 1993	Beijing, PR China

* - indicates ratified time. Auto times for Bragina's 8:52.8 and 8:27.2 were 8:52.74 and 8:27.12 respectively.

=== Indoor ===
World Athletics has ratified seven short track world records for the women's 3000 metres.

Time	Athlete	Date	Place
8:39.79	Zola Budd (GBR)	8 February 1986	Cosford
8:33.82	Elly van Hulst (NED)	4 March 1989	Budapest
8:32.88	Gabriela Szabo (ROU)	18 February 2001	Birmingham
8:29.15	Berhane Adere (ETH)	3 February 2002	Stuttgart
8:27.86	Liliya Shobukhova (RUS)	17 February 2006	Moscow
8:23.72	Meseret Defar (ETH)	3 February 2007	Stuttgart
8:16.60	Genzebe Dibaba (ETH)	6 February 2014	Stockholm
