= Chris Berger =

Dutch sprinter

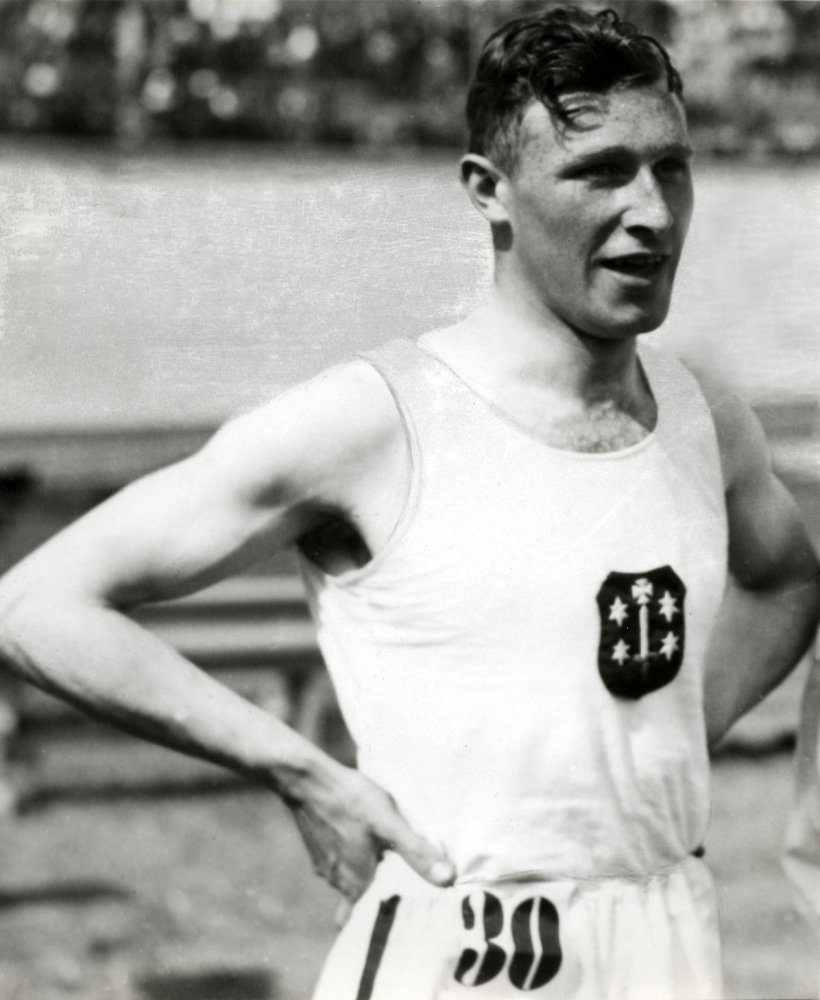
- Chris Berger in 1932

Personal information
- Born: 27 April 1911 Amsterdam, the Netherlands
- Died: 12 September 1965 (aged 54) Amsterdam, the Netherlands
- Height: 1.83 m (6 ft 0 in)
- Weight: 77 kg (170 lb)

Sport
- Sport: Sprint running
- Club: AV 1923
Medal record
Men's athletics
Representing the Netherlands
European Championships
Gold medal – first place	1934 Turin	100 m
Gold medal – first place	1934 Turin	200 m
Bronze medal – third place	1934 Turin	4×100 m

Christiaan David "Chris" Berger (27 April 1911 – 12 September 1965) was a Dutch athlete, competing in the sprints.

== Career ==
Berger was a football player and changed to running after winning a 100 national title among footballers. In 1930 he ran his best 200 m time (21.1 s), which would remain the European record until 1951 and the Dutch national record until 1965. Berger won the British AAA Championships title in the 100 yards event at the 1930 AAA Championships, in addition to finishing second behind Stanley Engelhart in then 220 yards event. He repeated the success of winning a British AAA title at the 1933 AAA Championships.

His career highlights came in 1934, when he had equalled the world record on the 100 m (10.3 s) in Amsterdam. Later at the first European Championships in Athletics, he won both the 100 m and 200 m sprints and finished third with the Dutch team at the 4 × 100 m relay. Originally the jury had declared the German athlete Erich Borchmeyer as winner of the 100 m, which led to outrage among the spectators who had clearly seen Berger win the race. The jury was eventually convinced to delay its decision after the films of the finish would be available the next day, which showed Berger to have won indeed.

Berger participated twice at the Olympics without much success. Much was expected from the Dutch athletes in 1932, but after a 10-day voyage by boat and a week on the train they didn't play much of a role in Los Angeles. Berger was eliminated in both sprints in the semifinals. In 1936, Berger had passed his peak and was overshadowed in his own country by Tinus Osendarp and Wil van Beveren, while the Dutch relay team ended up dropping the baton in the finals.

Between 1930 and 1934 Chris Berger won eight Dutch titles, four in each sprint event. He ended his career in sports in 1943 and became supervisor of the Olympic Stadium in Amsterdam. He died in Amsterdam in 1965 and is buried at Zorgvlied cemetery. His daughter Elles was a popular presenter on Dutch television.

== Competition record ==
Year	Competition	Venue	Position	Event	Notes
Representing Netherlands
1934	European Championships	Turin, Italy	1st	100 m	10.6
1934	European Championships	Turin, Italy	1st	200 m	21.5

Awards
Preceded by Wim Peters	Sauer Cup; 1942	Succeeded by Fanny Blankers-Koen
