= Hans Scheele =

German sprinter

Medal record

Men's athletics

Representing Germany

European Championships
Gold medal – first place	1934 Turin	400 m hurdles
Gold medal – first place	1934 Turin	4×400 m

Hans Scheele (18 December 1908 in Kirchwerder – 23 July 1941) was a German athlete who competed in the 1936 Summer Olympics. He was killed in action during World War II.
