= Mario Rabaglino =

Italian sprinter

Personal information
- Full name: Mario Augusto Rabaglino
- National team: Italy: 3 caps (1933-1934)
- Born: 21 October 1910 Turin, Italy
- Died: 1991 (aged 80–81) Kenya

Sport
- Sport: Athletics
- Event: Sprint

Achievements and titles
- Personal best: 400 m: 49.0 (1934)

Mario Rabaglino (21 October 1910 - 1991) was an Italian sprinter who was 6th in the 400 m at the 1934 European Athletics Championships.

== Biography ==
Mario Rabaglino, from Turin, immediately after his career as an athlete he embarked on that of architect and during the Second World War, an officer of the Italian army, was taken prisoner by the British in Kenya where he decided to settle once the war was over and where he died in 1991.

== Achievements ==
| Year | Competition | Venue | Rank | Event | Time | Notes |
|---|---|---|---|---|---|---|
| 1934 | European Championships | (Italy) Turin | 7 | 400 m | No time | |
| 1934 | European Championships | (Italy) Turin | 4 | 4×400 m relay | 3:19.0 | |

== See also ==
- Italy at the 1934 European Athletics Championships
