= Veikko Peräsalo =

Finnish high jumper

Personal information
- Nationality: Finnish
- Born: 1 February 1912 Ilmajoki, Finland
- Died: 25 August 1992 (aged 80) Jyväskylä, Finland

Sport
- Sport: Athletics
- Event: High jump
Medal record
Men's athletics
Representing Finland
European Championships
Bronze medal – third place	1934 Turin	High jump

Veikko Peräsalo (1 February 1912 – 25 August 1992) was a Finnish athlete. He competed in the men's high jump at the 1936 Summer Olympics.
