= Georges Guillez =

French sprinter

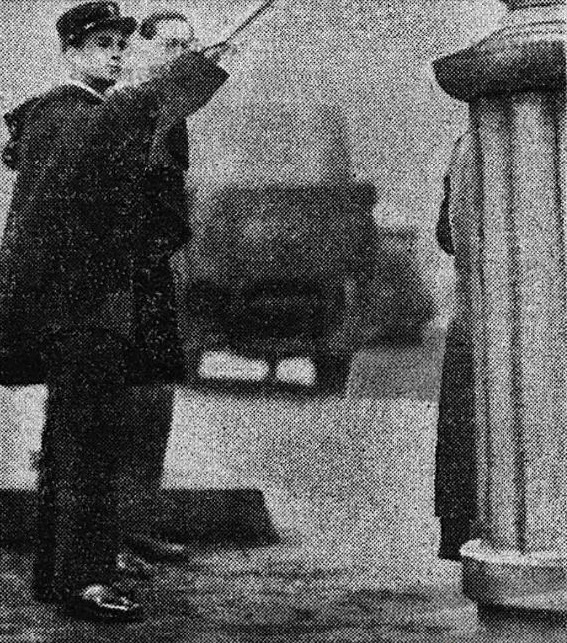
- Georges Guurez in 1934

Personal information
- Nationality: French
- Born: 3 September 1909
- Died: 15 April 1993 (aged 83)

Sport
- Sport: Sprinting
- Event: 4 × 400 metres relay
Medal record
Men's athletics
Representing France
European Championships
Silver medal – second place	1934 Turin	4×400 m

Georges Guillez (3 September 1909 – 15 April 1993) was a French sprinter. He competed in the men's 4 × 400 metres relay at the 1936 Summer Olympics.
