= Armas Toivonen =

Finnish long-distance runner

Medal record

Men's athletics

Representing Finland

Olympic Games
Bronze medal – third place	1932 Los Angeles	Marathon

European Championships
Gold medal – first place	1934 Turin	Marathon

Armas Adam Toivonen (January 20, 1899, Halikko – September 12, 1973) was a Finnish athlete who mainly competed in the men's marathon during his career.

He competed for Finland at the 1932 Summer Olympics held in Los Angeles, United States where he won the bronze medal in the men's marathon competition. Toivonen won the marathon at the 1934 European Athletics Championships.
