= 1934 European Athletics Championships – Men's shot put =

Men's shot put at the European Athletics Championships

The men's shot put at the 1934 European Athletics Championships was held in Turin, Italy, at the Stadio Benito Mussolini on 9 September 1934.

== Medalists ==
Gold	Arnold Viiding; Estonia
Silver	Risto Kuntsi; Finland
Bronze	František Douda; Czechoslovakia

== Results ==
=== Final ===
9 September

Rank	Name	Nationality	Result	Notes
1st place, gold medalist(s)	Arnold Viiding	Estonia	15.19	CR
2nd place, silver medalist(s)	Risto Kuntsi	Finland	15.19	
3rd place, bronze medalist(s)	František Douda	Czechoslovakia	15.18	
4	Samuel Norrby	Sweden	15.10	
5	Valfrid Rahmqvist	Sweden	15.01	
6	József Darányi	Hungary	14.86	
7	Zygmunt Heljasz	Poland	14.78	
8	Hans Woellke	Germany	14.67	
9	Clément Duhour	France	14.07	
10	Jules Noël	France	14.00	
11	Aad de Bruyn	Netherlands	13.88	
12	Aleksandar Kovacevic	Yugoslavia	13.88	
13	Lauro Bonincini	Italy	13.33	

== Participation ==
According to an unofficial count, 13 athletes from 11 countries participated in the event.

- Czechoslovakia (1)
- Estonia (1)
- Finland (1)
- France (2)
- Germany (1)
- Hungary (1)
- Italy (1)
- Netherlands (1)
- Poland (1)
- Sweden (2)
- Yugoslavia (1)
