= 1934 European Athletics Championships – Men's 5000 metres =

Men's 5000 metres at the European Athletics Championships
- Venue: Stadio Benito Mussolini
- Location: Turin
- Dates: 9 September (final)
- Competitors: 13 from 10 nations
- Winning time: 14:36.8

Medalists
gold medal	Roger Rochard	France
silver medal	Janusz Kusociński	Poland
bronze medal	Ilmari Salminen	Finland

The men's 5000 metres at the 1934 European Athletics Championships was held in Turin, Italy, at the Stadio Benito Mussolini on 9 September 1934.

== Results ==
=== Final ===
9 September

Rank	Name	Nationality	Time	Notes
1st place, gold medalist(s)	Roger Rochard	France	14:36.8	CR
2nd place, silver medalist(s)	Janusz Kusociński	Poland	14:41.2	
3rd place, bronze medalist(s)	Ilmari Salminen	Finland	14:43.6	
4	Lauri Virtanen	Finland	14:47.6	
5	Salvatore Mastroieni	Italy	15:00.6	
6	János Kelen	Hungary	15:06.6	
7	Nello Bartolini	Italy	15:26.0	
8	Eduard Prööm	Estonia	15:35.0	
9	Jenő Szilágyi	Hungary	15:43.0	
10	Voldemārs Vītols	Latvia	15:52.0	
11	Emil Müller	Switzerland	NT	
12	Christiaan Petit	Netherlands	NT	
13	Jozef Koščak	Czechoslovakia	16:10.0	

== Participation ==
According to an unofficial count, 13 athletes from 10 countries participated in the event.

- Czechoslovakia (1)
- Estonia (1)
- Finland (2)
- France (1)
- Hungary (2)
- Italy (2)
- Latvia (1)
- Netherlands (1)
- Poland (1)
- Switzerland (1)
