= Birger Halvorsen =

Norwegian high jumper (1905–1976)

Medal record

Men's athletics

Representing Norway

European Championships
Silver medal – second place	1934 Turin	High jump

Birger Halvorsen (19 February 1905 – 7 September 1976) was a Norwegian high jumper. He represented Horten FIK.

He won a silver medal at the 1934 European Championships in Turin with a jump of 1.97 metres. This remained his career best jump. He never participated in the Summer Olympics. He became Norwegian champion in the years 1931–1934.
