= Corrado Valle =

Italian hurdler

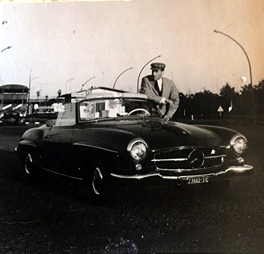
- Corrado Valle with his Mercedes-Benz 190 SL in the 1960s

Personal information
- National team: Italy: 2 caps (1932–1935)
- Born: 22 June 1909 Scansano, Italy
- Died: 1976 (aged 66–67) Capalbio, Italy

Sport
- Sport: Athletics
- Event: Hurdling
- Club: U.S. Pisa

Achievements and titles
- Personal best: 110 m hs: 14.7 (1934)

Corrado Valle (21 October 1909 – 1976) was an Italian hurdler who was 5th in the 110 metres hurdles (m hs) at the 1934 European Athletics Championships.

== Biography ==
Corrado Valle finished his sporting career in the end of the 1930s, afterwards obtaining a degree in economics and commerce. He married twice, and had two daughters, Gabriella from his first wife and Dada from his second wife. He died in 1976 at the age of 66 due to a car accident in Capalbio.

== Achievements ==
Year	Competition	Venue	Rank	Event	Time	Notes
1934	European Championships	(Italy) Turin	7	110 m hs	15.1	

== See also ==
- Italy at the 1934 European Athletics Championships
