= Thore Enochsson =

Swedish long-distance runner

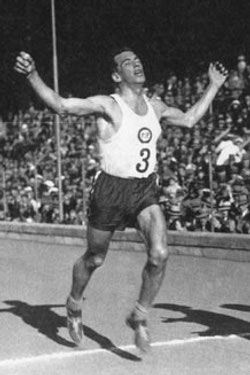
- Enochsson at the 1933 Stockholm half-marathon

Personal information
- Born: 17 November 1908 Östersund, Sweden
- Died: 14 March 1993 (aged 82) Bandhagen, Stockholm, Sweden
- Height: 176 cm (5 ft 9 in)
- Weight: 69 kg (152 lb)

Sport
- Sport: Athletics
- Event: Marathon
- Club: IK Ymer, Borås

Achievements and titles
- Personal best: Mar – 2:40:39 (1933)
Medal record
Men's athletics
Representing Sweden
European Championships
Silver medal – second place	1934 Turin	Marathon

Thore Sixten Enochsson (later Thorhammer, 17 November 1908 – 14 March 1993) was a Swedish long-distance runner. He won a silver medal in the marathon at the 1934 European Championships and finished tenth at the 1936 Summer Olympics. Enochsson won the Stockholm half-marathon (25 km) in 1933–36.
