= 1934 European Athletics Championships – Men's 100 metres =

Men's 100 metres at the 1934 European Athletics Championships
- Venue: Stadio Benito Mussolini
- Location: Turin
- Dates: 7 September (heats & semifinals); 8 September (final)
- Competitors: 15 from 10 nations
- Winning time: 10.6

Medalists
gold medal	Chris Berger	Netherlands
silver medal	Erich Borchmeyer	Germany
bronze medal	József Sir	Hungary

The men's 100 metres at the 1934 European Athletics Championships was held in Turin, Italy, at the Stadio Benito Mussolini on 7 and 8 September 1934.

== Participation ==
According to an unofficial count, 15 athletes from 10 countries participated in the event.

- Czechoslovakia (1)
- France (2)
- Germany (2)
- Hungary (1)
- Italy (2)
- Latvia (1)
- Netherlands (2)
- Portugal (1)
- Switzerland (2)
- Yugoslavia (1)

== Results ==
=== Heats ===
7 September

==== Heat 1 ====
Rank	Athlete	Nation	Time	Notes
1	Paul Hanni	Switzerland	11.1	Q
2	Julije Bauer	Yugoslavia	11.2	Q
3	Erich Borchmeyer	Germany	11.2	Q

==== Heat 2 ====
Rank	Athlete	Nation	Time	Notes
1	Chris Berger	Netherlands	10.6	Q, CR
2	Albert Jud	Switzerland	10.8	Q
3	Orazio Mariani	Italy	10.9	Q
4	Pierre Dondelinger	France	11.0	
5	Janis Kivitis	Latvia	NT	

==== Heat 3 ====
Rank	Athlete	Nation	Time	Notes
1	Gerd Hornberger	Germany	11.1	Q
2	Ulderico Di Blas	Italy	11.1	Q
3	Karel Bergmann	Czechoslovakia	11.3	Q
4	Mario Porto	Portugal	11.3	

==== Heat 4 ====
Rank	Athlete	Nation	Time	Notes
1	József Sir	Hungary	11.0	Q
2	Tinus Osendarp	Netherlands	11.1	Q
3	Robert Paul	France	NT	Q

=== Semi-finals ===
7 September

==== Semi-final 1 ====
Rank	Athlete	Nation	Time	Notes
1	József Sir	Hungary	10.6	Q, CR
2	Erich Borchmeyer	Germany	10.8	Q
3	Tinus Osendarp	Netherlands	10.9	Q
4	Orazio Mariani	Italy	10.9	
5	Albert Jud	Switzerland	NT	
6	Karel Bergmann	Czechoslovakia	NT	

==== Semi-final 2 ====
Rank	Athlete	Nation	Time	Notes
1	Chris Berger	Netherlands	10.7	Q
2	Paul Hanni	Switzerland	10.8	Q
3	Gerd Hornberger	Germany	10.9	Q
4	Julije Bauer	Yugoslavia	NT	
5	Ulderico Di Blas	Italy	NT	
6	Robert Paul	France	11.0	

=== Final ===
8 September

Rank	Athlete	Nation	Time	Notes
1st place, gold medalist(s)	Chris Berger	Netherlands	10.6	
2nd place, silver medalist(s)	Erich Borchmeyer	Germany	10.7	
3rd place, bronze medalist(s)	József Sir	Hungary	10.7	
4	Paul Hanni	Switzerland	10.8	
5	Tinus Osendarp	Netherlands	10.9	
6	Gerd Hornberger	Germany	10.9	
