= Antonio Milanese =

Italian triple jumper

Personal information
- National team: Italy: 2 caps (1934-1935)
- Born: 1 December 1912 Turin, Kingdom of Italy
- Died: Unknown

Sport
- Sport: Athletics
- Event: Triple jump

Achievements and titles
- Personal best: Triple jump: 14.54 m (1935)

Antonio Milanese (1 December 1912 - ?) was an Italian triple jumper who was 6th in the triple jump at the 1934 European Athletics Championships.

== Achievements ==
Year	Competition	Venue	Rank	Event	Time	Notes
1934	European Championships	(Italy) Turin	6th	Triple jump	14.34 m	

== See also ==
- Italy at the 1934 European Athletics Championships
