= Gino Ricci =

Italian javelin thrower

Personal information
- National team: Italy: 2 caps (1934)
- Born: 8 December 1910 Alessandria, Italy
- Died: Unknown

Sport
- Sport: Athletics
- Event: Javelin throw

Achievements and titles
- Personal best: Javelin throw: 59.69 m (1934)

Gino Ricci (8 December 1910 - ?) was an Italian javelin thrower, speciality in which he was 8th at the 1934 European Athletics Championships.

== Achievements ==
Year	Competition	Venue	Rank	Event	Time	Notes
1934	European Championships	(Italy) Turin	8th	Javelin throw	56.63 m	

== See also ==
- Italy at the 1934 European Athletics Championships
