= Lidia Bongiovanni =

Italian high jumper

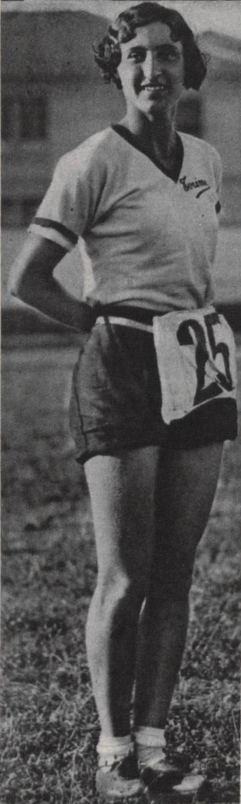

Personal information
- Nationality: Italian
- Born: 1 October 1914 Turin, Italy
- Died: 18 February 1998 (aged 83) Turin, Italy

Sport
- Country: Italy
- Sport: Athletics
- Event(s): Sprint; Discus throw Standing high jump
- Club: SG Torino

Achievements and titles
- Personal best: 100 m: 12.9 (1936)
Medal record
International University Games
Gold medal – first place	1933 Turin	Discus throw
Gold medal – first place	1933 Turin	4x100 m relay

Lidia Bongiovanni (Turin, 1 October 1914 – 18 February 1998) was an Italian versatile athlete.

== Achievements ==
Year	Competition	Venue	Position	Event	Performance	Note
1933	International University Games	(Italy) Turin	1st	Discus throw	25.62 m	
1933	International University Games	(Italy) Turin	1st	4 × 100 m relay	51.5	
1936	Olympic Games	(Germany) Berlin	4th	4 × 100 m relay	48.7	

== National titles ==
Lidia Bongiovanni has won one national championship.

- 1 win in Standing high jump (1931)

== See also ==
- Italy national relay team
