= Georg Braathe =

Norwegian long-distance runner

Georg Braathe (15 December 1903 – 23 May 1968) was a Norwegian long-distance runner who specialized in the 5000 and 10,000 metres. He represented IK Tjalve.

He finished fourth in 10,000 metres at the 1934 European Championships. He never participated in other international events like the Summer Olympics. He became Norwegian champion in 5000 m in 1933 and 1934 and in 10,000 m in the years 1933-1935.
