= Bertil von Wachenfeldt =

Swedish sprinter

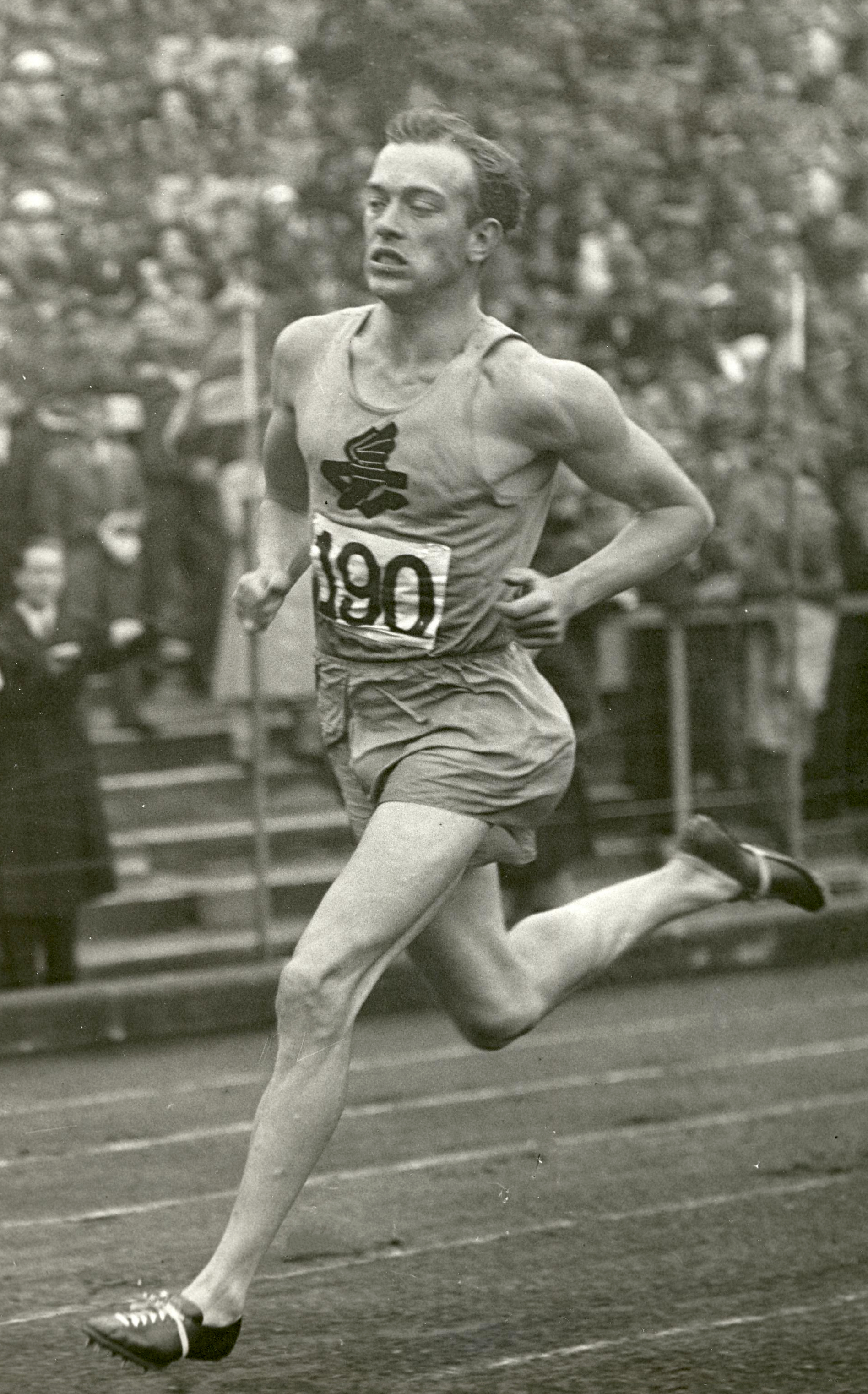
- Bertil von Wachenfeldt in the 1930's

Personal information
- Born: 4 March 1909 Storvik, Sweden
- Died: 30 September 1995 (aged 86) Gothenburg, Sweden
- Height: 1.88 m (6 ft 2 in)
- Weight: 78 kg (172 lb)

Sport
- Sport: Athletics
- Event: 400 m
- Club: IF Thor, Uppsala; IK Göta

Achievements and titles
- Personal best: 400 m – 47.8 (1937)
Medal record
Men's athletics
Representing Sweden
European Championships
Bronze medal – third place	1934 Turin	400 m
Bronze medal – third place	1934 Turin	4×400 m
Bronze medal – third place	1938 Paris	4×400 m

Johan Bertil Karl von Wachenfeldt (4 March 1909 – 30 September 1995) was a Swedish sprinter who specialized in the 400 m distance. He competed in the 4 × 400 m relay at the 1928 and 1936 Summer Olympics and finished in fourth and fifth place, respectively; in 1936 he failed to reach the final of the individual 400 m event.

Wachenfeldt won three bronze medals at the European championships: two in 1934 and one in 1938. He won the national 400 m title in 1935 and 1938 and held the national records over 300 m and 400 m.
