= Michele Fanelli =

Italian long-distance runner (1907-1989)

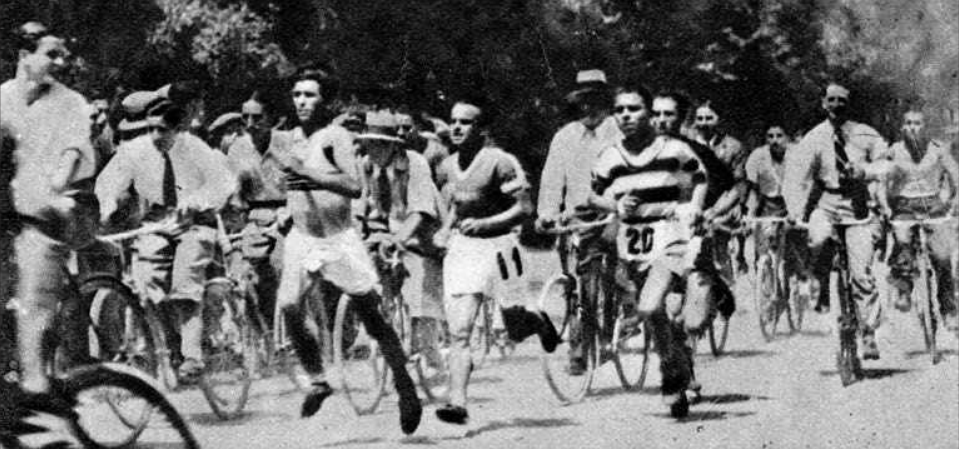
- Fanelli, first runner from left (the only without a number) in a half marathon race in Florence in 1931.

Personal information
- Nationality: Italian
- Born: 14 September 1907 Orta Nova, Italy
- Died: 13 December 1989 (aged 82)

Sport
- Sport: Long-distance running
- Event: Marathon

Michele Fanelli (14 September 1907 – 13 December 1989) was an Italian long-distance runner. He competed in the marathon at the 1932 Summer Olympics.

== See also ==
- Italy at the 1934 European Athletics Championships
