= Holger Albrechtsen =

Norwegian hurdler (1906–1992)

Personal information
- Nationality: Norwegian
- Born: 23 June 1906 Arendal, Norway
- Died: 14 August 1992 (aged 86)

Sport
- Sport: Athletics
- Event: Hurdles
Medal record
Men's athletics
Representing Norway
European Championships
Bronze medal – third place	1934 Turin	110 m hurdles

Holger Albrechtsen (23 June 1906 – 14 August 1992) was a Norwegian hurdler who specialized in the 110 and 400 metre hurdles.

== Biography ==
Albrechtsen finished third behind David Burghley in the 120 yards hurdles event at the 1931 AAA Championships.

Albrechtsen won a bronze medal in 110 metre hurdles and finished fourth in 400 metre hurdles at the 1934 European Championships. He never participated in other international events like the Summer Olympics. He became Norwegian champion in 110 metre hurdles in 1934, 1936 and 1938 and in 400 metre hurdles in 1934 and 1935. He represented IK Tjalve, having moved to Oslo from his native Arendal.

His career best time in 110 metre hurdles was 14.7 seconds, achieved in July 1933 at Bislett stadion. A year later, on the same track, he clocked a career best time in 400 metre hurdles of 54.0 seconds.

He was a board member of the Norwegian Athletics Association from 1945 through 1950, then a deputy board member from 1954 through 1955.

He died in 1992.
