= Johann Langmayr =

Austrian hurdler

Personal information
- Nationality: Austrian
- Born: 29 August 1910
- Died: 1943 (aged 32–33)

Sport
- Sport: Track and field
- Event: 110 metres hurdles

Johann Langmayr (29 August 1910 – 1943) was an Austrian hurdler. He competed in the men's 110 metres hurdles at the 1936 Summer Olympics. He was killed in action during World War II.
