= Margaret Cox (athlete) =

British

Personal information
- Nationality: British (English)
- Born: 6 August 1914
- Died: 9 August 2004 (aged 90)

Sport
- Sport: Athletics
- Event: Javelin throw
- Club: Birchfield Harriers
Medal record
Women's Athletics
Representing England
British Empire Games
Bronze medal – third place	1934 London	Javelin throw

Margaret Joan Cox (6 August 1914 – 9 August 2004) was an English track and field athlete who competed at the 1934 British Empire Games.

== Biography ==
Cox studied at the University of Birmingham and was a member of the Birchfield Harriers.

Cox was the winner of the javelin at the 1933 International University Games – the only non-Italian woman to win at the competition, in front of the dictator Mussolini.

She represented England at the 1934 British Empire Games in London, where she competed in the javelin throw event and winning a bronze medal.

Consequently she formed part of an English medal sweep with Gladys Lunn and Edith Halstead.
