= Risto Kuntsi =

Finnish shot putter (1912–1964)

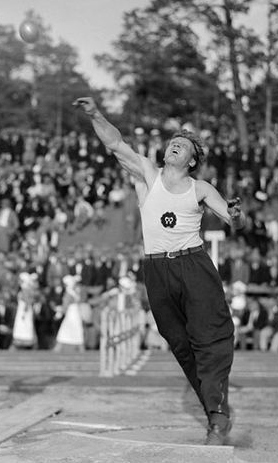
- Risto Kuntsi in 1935

Personal information
- Born: 18 June 1912 Jyväskylä, Finland
- Died: 6 August 1964 (aged 52) Helsinki, Finland
- Height: 1.85 m (6 ft 1 in)
- Weight: 87 kg (192 lb)

Sport
- Sport: Athletics
- Event: Shot put
- Club: Vaasan Vasama, Vaasa

Achievements and titles
- Personal best: 15.65 m (1935)
Medal record
Men's athletics
Representing Finland
European Championships
Silver medal – second place	1934 Turin	Shot put

Risto Johannes Kuntsi (18 June 1912 – 6 August 1964) was a Finnish shot putter who won a silver medal at the 1934 European Championships. He competed at the 1936 Summer Olympics and finished in 13th place.
