= Ilmari Salminen =

Finnish long-distance runner

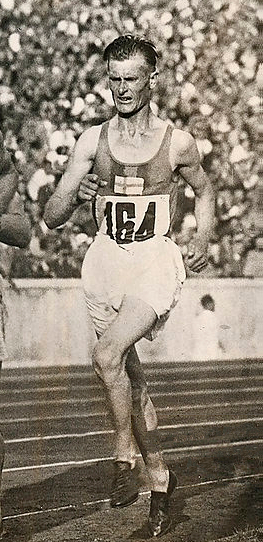
- Salminen at the 1936 Olympics

Personal information
- Born: 21 September 1902 Elimäki, Finland, Russian Empire
- Died: 5 January 1986 (aged 83) Kouvola, Finland
- Height: 181 cm (5 ft 11 in)
- Weight: 66 kg (146 lb)

Sport
- Sport: Athletics
- Events: 5000 m, 10000 m
- Club: Kouvolan Urheilijat

Achievements and titles
- Personal bests: 5000 m – 14:22.0 (1939); 10000 m – 30:05.5 (1937)
Medal record
Men's athletics
Representing Finland
Olympic Games
Gold medal – first place	1936 Berlin	10,000 m
European Championships
Gold medal – first place	1934 Turin	10,000 m
Gold medal – first place	1938 Paris	10,000 m
Bronze medal – third place	1934 Turin	5000 m

Ilmari R. Salminen (21 September 1902 – 5 January 1986) was a Finnish long-distance runner, winner of the 10,000 metres at the 1936 Summer Olympics.

Salminen became one of the best long-distance runners in the 1930s when he began his international athletics career in 1934 by winning the 10,000 m and taking bronze in 5000 m at the first European Championships in Turin, thus becoming a main favorite at the Olympic 10,000 m run.

On the first day of competitions in the Berlin Olympics, Salminen won the 10,000 m final before compatriots Arvo Askola and Volmari Iso-Hollo. Salminen managed to hold off Askola by a margin of 0.2 seconds. In the 5000 m final a few days later, Salminen finished in sixth place.

In the next season, Salminen ran a new 10,000 m world record of 30:05.6. He also ran a new world record in six miles. Salminen finished his international career by winning the gold medal in 10,000 m at the 1938 European Championships and retired from athletics after the next season. He later became a sports official and headed the organizing committee of the 1952 Summer Olympics in Helsinki.

Records
Preceded by (Finland) Paavo Nurmi	Men's 10,000 m World Record Holder; 18 July 1937 – 29 September 1938	Succeeded by (Finland) Taisto Mäki
