= Spartaco Morelli =

Italian marathon runner

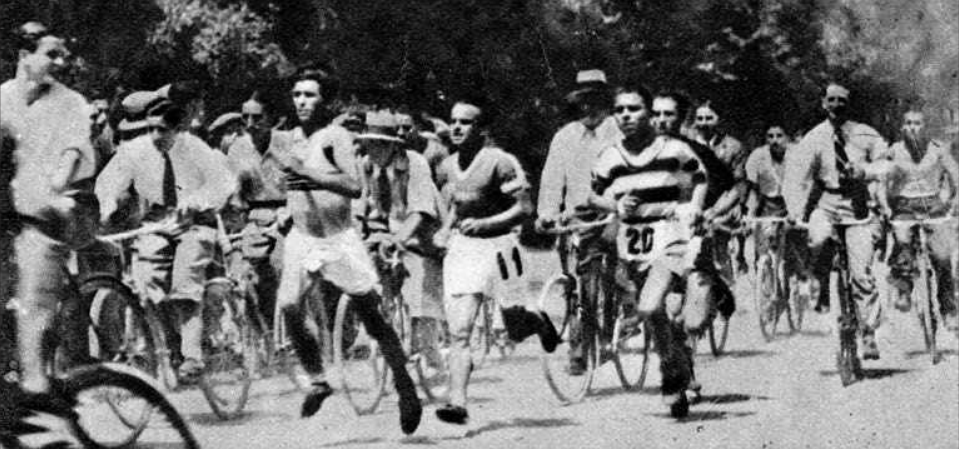
- Morelli (#20), in 1930.

Personal information
- National team: Italy: 1 cap (1934)
- Born: 15 September 1908 Lörrach, Switzerland
- Died: 31 December 1968 (aged 60) Milan, Italy

Sport
- Sport: Athletics
- Event: Marathon

Achievements and titles
- Personal best: Marathon: 2:58:28.4 (1938)

Spartaco Morelli (15 September 1908 – 31 December 1968) was a Swiss-born Italian marathon runner who was 7th in the 10,000 m at the 1934 European Athletics Championships.

Morelli won three national championships at individual senior level.
