= Willem Peters =

Dutch athlete

Personal information
- Nickname: Wim
- Born: 5 July 1903 Meppel, Netherlands
- Died: 30 March 1995 (aged 91) Zwolle, Netherlands

Sport
- Sport: Athletics
- Event: triple jump/long jump
- Club: PEC, Zwolle
Medal record
Men's athletics
Representing Netherlands
European Championships
Gold medal – first place	1934 Turin	Triple jump

Willem Peters (5 July 1903 – 30 March 1995) was a Dutch athlete who competed in the 1924 Summer Olympics, in the 1928 Summer Olympics, and in the 1932 Summer Olympics. From 1927 to 1937 Peters won six triple jump titles at the prestigious AAA Championships.

== Biography ==
Peters was born in Meppel.

He was selected by the Dutch team for the 1924 Olympic Gamnes, where he finished 11th in the men's triple jump.

Peters won the British AAA Championships title in the triple jump event at the 1927 AAA Championships and also secured a third-place finish behind Rudi Dobermann in the long jump. He retained the British AAA title at the 1928 AAA Championships, the 1929 AAA Championships and the 1930 AAA Championships.

Several years later he returned to compete in the British AAAs and won the title again at the 1935 AAA Championships and the 1937 AAA Championships.

He died in Zwolle aged 91.

Awards
Preceded by Fanny Blankers-Koen	Sauer Cup; 1941	Succeeded by Chris Berger
