= Janusz Kusociński =

Polish long-distance runner

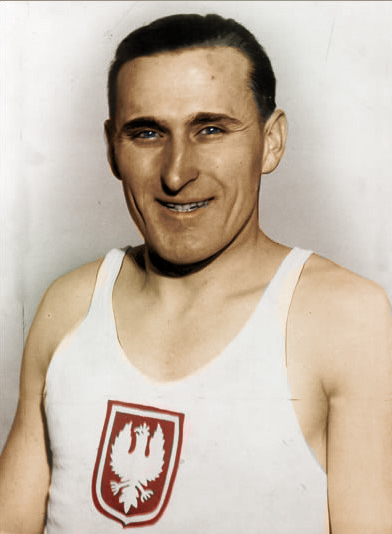

Personal information
- Nationality: Polish
- Born: 15 January 1907 Olterzewo, Warszawa, Mazowieckie, Poland
- Died: 21 June 1940 (aged 33) Palmiry Warszawa, Mazowieckie, Poland
- Height: 167 cm (5 ft 6 in)
- Weight: kg

Sport
- Sport: Athletics
- Event: middle-distance
- Club: Sarmaty Warszawa
Medal record
Men's athletics
Representing Poland
Olympic Games
Gold medal – first place	1932 Los Angeles	10,000 m
European Championships
Silver medal – second place	1934 Turin	5000 m

Janusz Tadeusz Kusociński (15 January 1907 – 21 June 1940) was a Polish athlete, winner in the 10,000 meters event at the 1932 Summer Olympics.

== Biography ==
Born in Warsaw into the family of a railroad worker, Janusz Kusociński, or Kusy as he was nicknamed, played football for various Warsaw clubs as a schoolboy. He took up athletics in 1928 after joining the sport club "Sarmata". His coach there was the famous Estonian, decathlete Aleksander Klumberg.

In his first competition at the Polish National Championships, Kusociński surprisingly won the 5000 m and cross country titles. He missed the next season, because he was called to duty by the Polish army, but he came back stronger than ever. He won the Polish Championship titles in the 1500 m and the 5000 m, in cross country in 1930 and 1931, and in the 800 m in 1932.

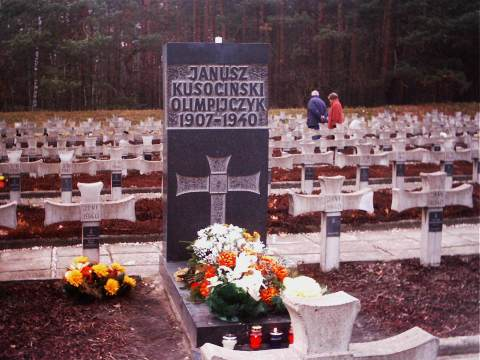
Tomb of Janusz Kusociński in Palmiry near Warsaw

In 1932 Kusociński was working as a gardener in a park in Warsaw. Just about a month before the Los Angeles Olympics, Kusociński ran a new world record in the 3000 m (8:18.8) and later that year, he set a new unofficial world record in running 4 miles in a time of 19:02.6. At the Olympics, Kusociński won a close battle against the Finns Volmari Iso-Hollo and Lasse Virtanen in the 10 000 m, with a world season's best time of 30:11.4.

Kusociński won the British AAA Championships title in the 3 miles event at the 1934 AAA Championships.

After finishing second in the first European Championships at Turin in the 5000 m in 1934, Kusociński decided to retire from athletics, but made a comeback in 1939 by winning the 10 000 m at the Polish National Championships.

Kusociński volunteered for the Polish army after Poland was attacked by the Germans and was wounded twice. During the German occupation he worked as a waiter, but was secretly a member of the Polish resistance. Janusz Kusociński was arrested by the Gestapo on 26 March 1940 during the AB Action and imprisoned in Mokotów Prison. He was executed three months later in Palmiry, near Warsaw.

An annual athletics competition, the Kusociński Memorial, is held in Poland in his honour. It was in its 55th edition in 2009. On 12 August 2009, he was posthumously awarded the Commander's Cross with Star of the Order of Polonia Restituta, "for outstanding contribution to the independence of the Polish Republic, for sporting achievements in the field of athletics".

Records
Preceded by (Finland) Paavo Nurmi	Men's 3,000 m World Record Holder; 19 June 1932 – 24 July 1934	Succeeded by (Denmark) Henry Nielsen
