= Mario Brignoli =

Italian racewalker

Personal information
- Nationality: Italian
- Born: 20 February 1902 Milan, Kingdom of Italy
- Died: 8 January 1990 (aged 87)

Sport
- Country: Italy
- Sport: Athletics
- Event: Race walk

Mario Brignoli (20 February 1902 – 8 January 1990) was an Italian racewalker who competed at the 1936 Summer Olympics.
