= Sven Strömberg =

Swedish sprinter (1911–1986)

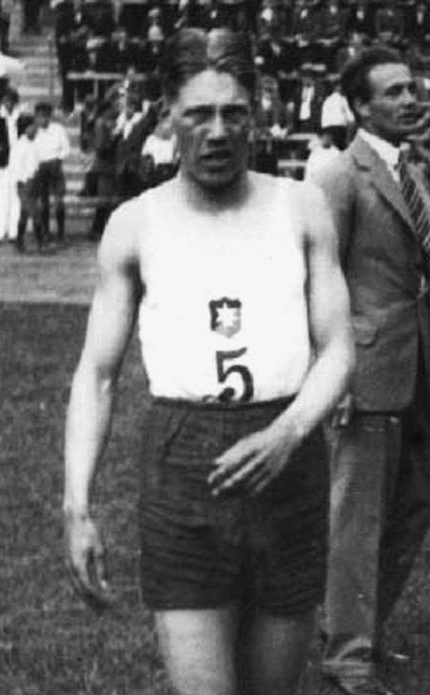

Personal information
- Born: 22 January 1911 Karlskrona, Sweden
- Died: 22 October 1986 (aged 75) Gothenburg, Sweden
- Height: 176 cm (5 ft 9 in)
- Weight: 73 kg (161 lb)

Sport
- Sport: Athletics
- Event: Sprint
- Club: Örgryte IS, Göteborg

Achievements and titles
- Personal best: 400 m – 48.3 (1934)
Medal record
Men's athletics
Representing Sweden
European Championships
Bronze medal – third place	1934 Turin	4×400 m

Sven Emil Strömberg (22 January 1911 – 22 October 1986) was a Swedish sprinter who won a bronze medal in the 4 × 400 m relay at the 1934 European Championships. He competed in the 400 m and 4 × 400 m events at the 1936 Summer Olympics and finished fifth in the relay.
