= Adolf Metzner =

German sprinter

Medal record

Men's athletics

Representing Germany

European Championships
Gold medal – first place	1934 Turin	400 m
Gold medal – first place	1934 Turin	4×400 m

Adolf Metzner (25 April 1910 in Frankenthal – 5 March 1978 in Hamburg) was a German athlete who competed in the 1932 Summer Olympics and in the 1936 Summer Olympics. After finishing his career due to Achilles tendon rupture he became a carpenter in the Bavaria region of Germany. In 1947 he worked with Ernst Gadermann to develop the first telemetric measurements of the ECG in athletes.
