= Aurelio Genghini =

Italian long-distance runner

Personal information
- Nationality: Italian
- Born: 1 October 1907 San Giovanni, Italy
- Died: 10 September 2001 (aged 93) Rome, Italy

Sport
- Sport: Long-distance running
- Event: Marathon
Medal record
Men's athletics
Representing Italy
European Championships
Bronze medal – third place	1934 Turin	Marathon

Aurelio Genghini (1 October 1907 – 10 September 2001) was an Italian long-distance runner. He competed in the marathon at the 1936 Summer Olympics.
