= Matti Sippala =

Finnish Olympian

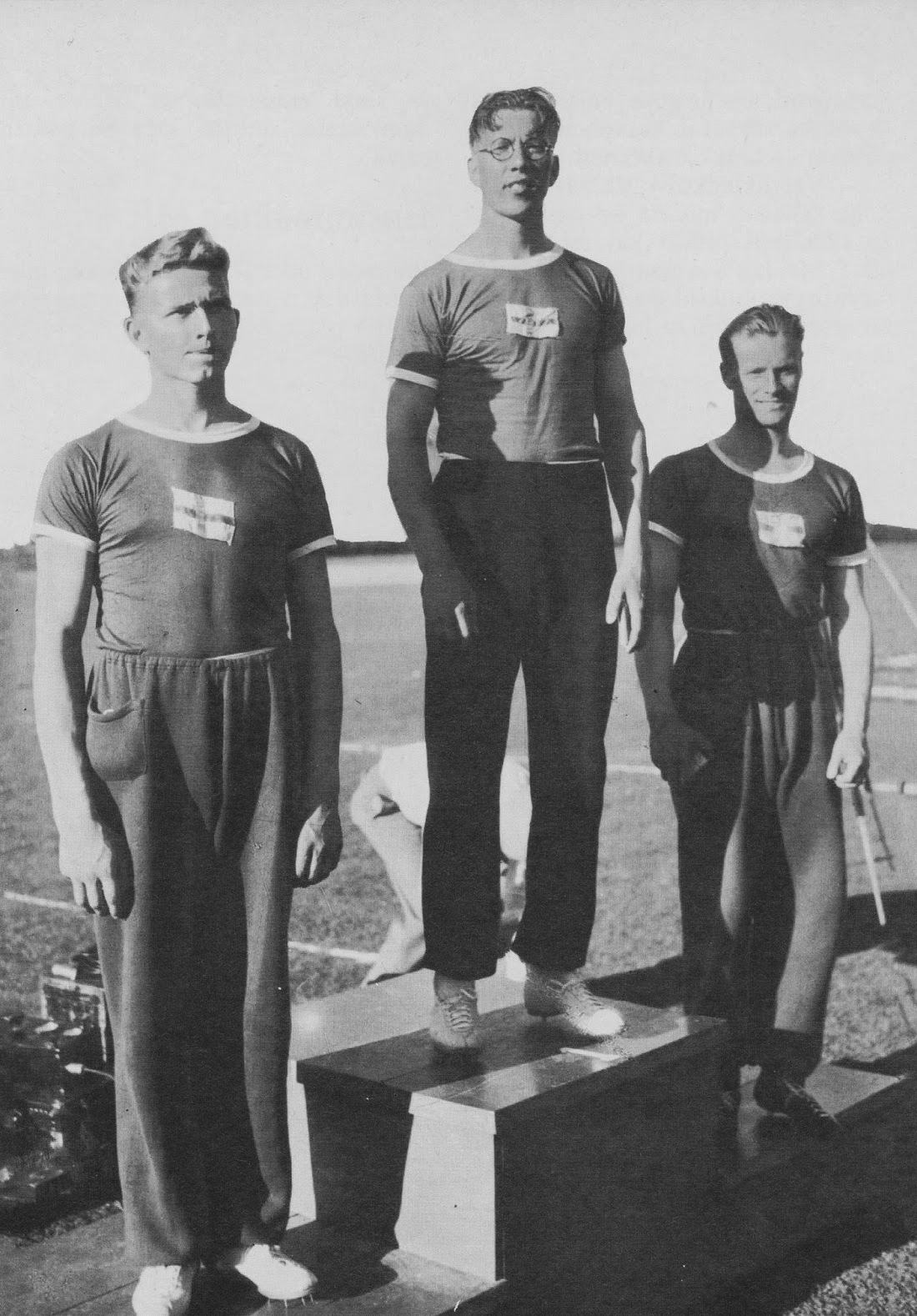
- Matti Sippala, Matti Järvinen and Eino Penttilä made it an all-Finnish podium at the 1932 Olympics

Personal information
- Born: 11 March 1908 Hollola, Finland
- Died: 22 August 1997 (aged 89) Kotka, Finland
- Height: 1.83 m (6 ft 0 in)
- Weight: 84 kg (185 lb)

Sport
- Sport: Athletics
- Event: Javelin throw
- Club: Lahden Urheilijat, Lahti

Achievements and titles
- Personal best: 70.54 m (1934)
Medal record
Men's athletics
Representing Finland
Olympic Games
Silver medal – second place	1932 Los Angeles	Javelin throw
European Championships
Silver medal – second place	1934 Turin	Javelin throw

Matti Kalervo Sippala (11 March 1908 – 22 August 1997) was a Finnish athlete. His main event was the javelin throw, in which he won the silver medal at both the 1932 Summer Olympics and the 1934 European Championships, but he was also a good pentathlete, breaking the unofficial world record in 1931.

== Career ==
Sippala defeated javelin world record holder Matti Järvinen at the Finnish Olympic tryouts in 1932, throwing 70.02. At the Olympics in Los Angeles, however, Järvinen dominated, throwing beyond 70 m five times with a best throw of 72.71. Sippala, who had strained his back in training, threw 68.14 m on his first attempt, 4 cm less than Germany's Gottfried Weimann; he failed to improve over the next four rounds, staying in third place until the third Finn, Eino Penttilä, reached 68.70 in round five. In the sixth and final round Sippala threw 69.80 m, moving from fourth to second place as Finland swept the medals.

Sippala threw his personal best, 70.54 m, in Riga in 1934. At that year's European Championships in Turin he won another silver medal with 69.97 m, again behind Järvinen who broke his own world record.

In addition to the javelin, Sippala competed in combined events. He won silver in the decathlon at the 1930 Finnish championships, but never reached the international elite in that event. In the non-Olympic pentathlon, however, he won several national titles; at the 1931 Finnish championships he scored 4083 points and defeated Olympic decathlon champion Paavo Yrjölä in a close competition as both exceeded Martti Tolamo's unofficial world record of 4011.
