= Arvo Askola =

Finnish long-distance runner (1909–1975)

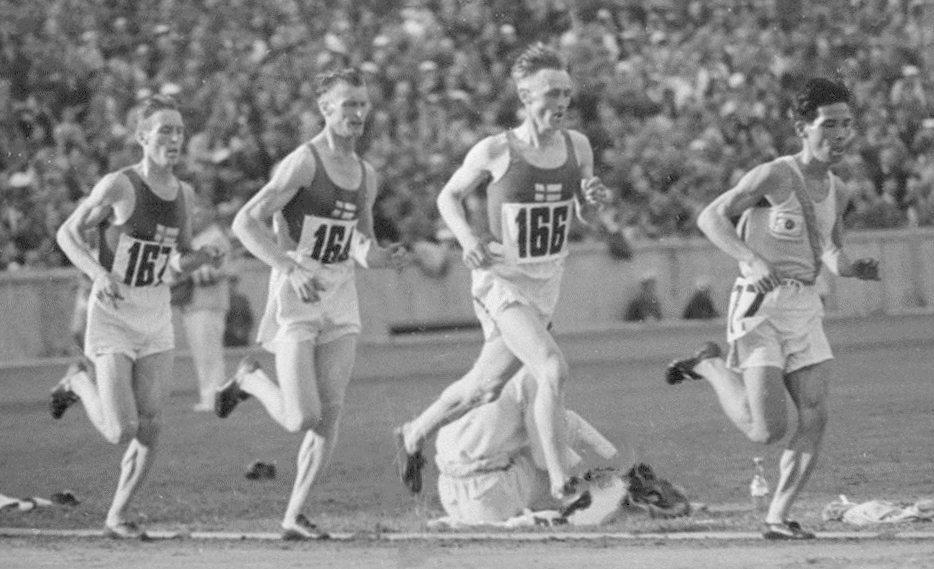
- Askola (2nd right) at the 1936 Summer Olympics

Personal information
- Full name: Arvo Askola
- Nationality: Finland
- Born: 2 December 1909 Valkeala, Finland, Russian Empire
- Died: 23 November 1975 (aged 65) Kuusankoski, Finland
- Height: 1.74 m (5 ft 9 in)
- Weight: 65 kg (143 lb)

Sport
- Sport: Running
- Event(s): Steeplechase, 5000 m, 10000 m
- Club: Kymintehtaan Urheiluseura

Achievements and titles
- Personal best(s): 3000 mS – 9:34.1 (1933); 5000 m – 14:30.0 (1937); 10000 m – 30:15.6 (1936)
Medal record
Men's athletics
Representing Finland
Olympic Games
Silver medal – second place	1936 Berlin	10,000 metres
European Championships
Silver medal – second place	1934 Turin	10,000 metres

Arvo Askola (2 December 1909 in Valkeala – 23 November 1975) was a Finnish long-distance runner. He won silver medals in the 10,000 m event at the 1936 Olympics and 1934 European Championships.
