= Arnold Viiding =

Estonian athlete

Medal record

Men's athletics

Representing Estonia

European Championships
Gold medal – first place	1934 Turin	Shot put

Arnold Viiding (19 March 1911 in Valga, Estonia – 20 October 2006 in Sydney, Australia) was an Estonian shot putter and discus thrower. At the 1936 Summer Olympics, he achieved eighth place in the shot put event with 15.23 metres.

== Biography ==
Viiding graduated from the Tallinn Police School in 1932 and worked as a policeman. In 1936, he joined the academic corporation Fraternitas Estica. In 1940, he graduated from the Faculty of Law at the University of Tartu. After the Nazi occupation in 1941 during the Second World War, Viiding served as the chief of the police school of the Estonian Security Police.

In 1944, Viiding fled the Soviet occupation of Estonia and emigrated first to Germany and in 1949 to Australia. Along with other Estonians, he established a plastics factory, "Arnolds Plastics".
