= Ernst Leitner =

Austrian hurdler

Personal information
- Nationality: Austrian
- Born: 27 October 1912
- Died: 24 November 1951 (aged 39)

Sport
- Sport: Track and field
- Event: 110 metres hurdles

Ernst Leitner (27 October 1912 – 24 November 1951) was an Austrian hurdler. He competed in the men's 110 metres hurdles at the 1936 Summer Olympics.
