= Pierre Skawinski =

French sprinter

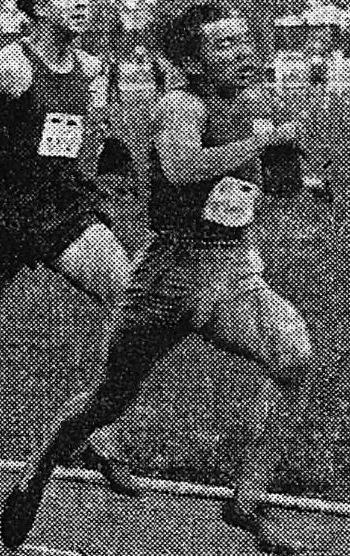
- Pierre Skawinski in 1936.

Personal information
- Nationality: French
- Born: 23 December 1912 Bordeaux, France
- Died: 20 March 2009 (aged 96)

Sport
- Sport: Sprinting
- Event: 400 metres
Medal record
Men's athletics
Representing France
European Championships
Silver medal – second place	1934 Turin	400 m
Silver medal – second place	1934 Turin	4×400 m

Pierre Skawinski (23 December 1912 – 20 March 2009) was a French sprinter. He competed in the men's 400 metres at the 1936 Summer Olympics.
