= Giacomo Carlini =

Italian sportsman

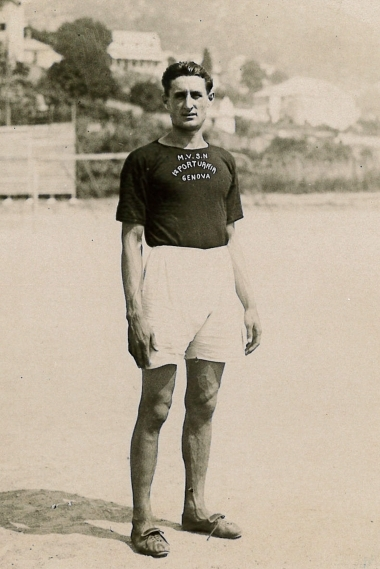

Personal information
- Nationality: Italian
- Born: 2 August 1904 Genoa, Italy
- Died: 2 March 1963 (aged 58)
- Height: 1.68 m (5 ft 6 in)
- Weight: 68 kg (150 lb)

Sport
- Country: Italy
- Sport: Athletics
- Events: 400 metres 110 metres hurdles Combined events
- Club: G.S. Nafta Genova

Achievements and titles
- Personal bests: 400 m: 48.6 (1930); 110 m hs: 15.0 (1930)

Giacomo Carlini (2 August 1904 – 2 August 1963) was an Italian sprinter, hurdler and a specialist in combined events.

== Biography ==
He competed in two editions of the Summer Olympics (1928 and 1932).

== Olympic results ==
Year	Competition	Venue	Position	Event	Performance	Note
1928	Olympic Games	(Netherlands) Amsterdam	Heat	110 metres hurdles	15.9	
1928	Olympic Games	(Netherlands) Amsterdam	Heat	4 × 400 m relay	3.17.8	
1932	Olympic Games	(United States) Los Angeles	6th	4 × 400 m relay	3:17.8	

== National titles ==
Giacomo Carlini has won 11 times the individual national championship.

- 1 win in the 400 metres (1933)
- 3 wins in the 110 metres hurdles (1927, 1928, 1929)
- 6 wins in the pentathlon (1925, 1926, 1927, 1928, 1929, 1930)
- 2 wins in the decathlon (1927, 1930)

== See also ==
- Italy national relay team
