= Bruno Betti =

Personal information
- Nationality: Italian
- Born: 31 May 1911 Borgo Santo Loria
- Died: 2 November 1986 (aged 75) Florence

Sport
- Country: Italy
- Sport: Athletics
- Event(s): Long-distance running 3000 metres steeplechase
- Club: ASSI Giglio Rosso

Bruno Betti (31 May 1911 – 2 November 1986) was an Italian long-distance runner who competed at the 1936 Summer Olympics.
