= Matti Järvinen =

Finnish javelin thrower

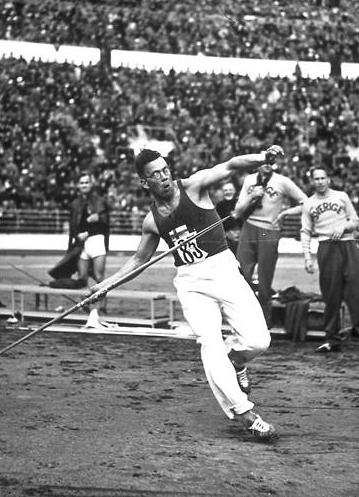
- Järvinen at the 1932 Olympics

Personal information
- Full name: Matti Henrikki Järvinen
- Born: 18 February 1909 Tampere, Finland
- Died: 22 July 1985 (aged 76) Helsinki, Finland
- Height: 1.86 m (6 ft 1 in)
- Weight: 76 kg (168 lb)

Sport
- Sport: Javelin throw
- Club: Kerkkoon Nuorisoseuran Urheilijat; Helsingin Kisa-Veikot
Medal record
Men's athletics
Representing Finland
Olympic Games
Gold medal – first place	1932 Los Angeles	Javelin throw
European Championships
Gold medal – first place	1934 Turin	Javelin throw
Gold medal – first place	1938 Paris	Javelin throw

Matti Henrikki Järvinen (18 February 1909 – 22 July 1985) was a Finnish javelin thrower. He won the Olympic gold medal at the 1932 Summer Olympics ahead of two other Finns, Matti Sippala and Eino Penttilä, with a throw of 72.71 metres. Four of his other five throws would also have been enough to take gold. The three Finns did not take off their tracksuit trousers during the event.

Besides his Olympic gold, Järvinen is remembered for his numerous world records. From 1930 to 1936, he broke the javelin throw world record a record ten times in a row. He also became the European champion in 1934, setting a new world record with 76.66 m, and defended his title successfully in 1938. In the 1936 Summer Olympics, Järvinen finished fifth. Järvinen continued throwing after World War II, recording a 71.70-metre throw in 1945.

Järvinen was the son of Verner Järvinen, an Olympic bronze medalist in discus throw. His brother Akilles Järvinen was a decathlon world record holder and two-time Olympic silver medalist. His other brother Kalle was a shot putter and also an Olympian.

The exact distance of his gold-winning throw, 72.71 metres, was used as the height of the Helsinki Olympic Stadium in commemoration of his achievement.

== World War II and after ==
In 1939 Järvinen, with his fellow javelin thrower Yrjö Nikkanen, served together on the Karelian Isthmus, where they trained soldiers in throwing hand grenades. After the War he became a noted economic councillor.

== World records ==
Result (m)	Date	Venue
71.57	8 August 1930	Viipuri
71.70	17 August 1930	Tampere
71.88	31 August 1930	Vaasa
72.93	14 September 1930	Viipuri
74.02	27 June 1932	Turku
74.28	25 May 1933	Mikkeli
74.61	7 June 1933	Vaasa
76.10	15 June 1933	Helsinki
76.66	7 September 1934	Turin
77.23	18 June 1936	Helsinki
