= Raymond Boisset =

French sprinter

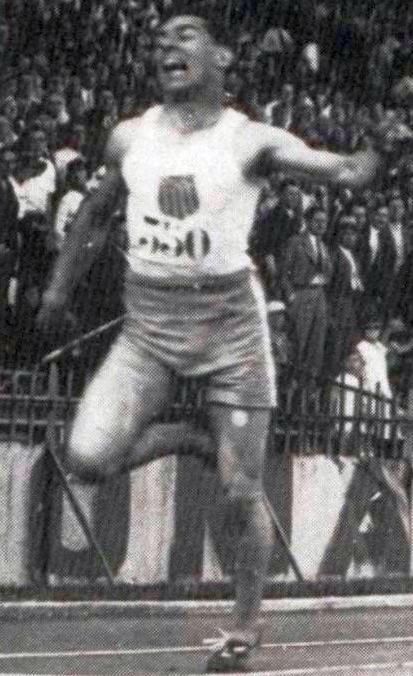

Personal information
- Nationality: French
- Born: 26 March 1912 La Pacaudière, Loire, France
- Died: 6 July 1991 (aged 79) Paris, France
- Height: 171 cm (5 ft 7 in)
- Weight: 72 kg (159 lb)

Sport
- Sport: Sprinting
- Event: 400 metres
- Club: PUC, Paris
Medal record
Men's athletics
Representing France
European Championships
Silver medal – second place	1934 Turin	4×400 m

Raymond Félix Claude Boisset (26 March 1912 – 6 July 1991) was a French sprinter who competed at the 1936 Summer Olympics.

== Biography ==
Boisset finished second behind Bill Roberts in the 440 yards event at the 1935 AAA Championships.

At the 1936 Olympic Games in Berlin, he competed in the men's 400 metres.
