= Ingvard Andersen =

Danish athletics competitor

Personal information
- Nationality: Danish

Sport
- Sport: Athletics
- Event: Long jump

Ingvard Andersen was a Danish athlete who competed as a long jumper in the 1936 Summer Olympics.
