= Angelo Ferrario =

Italian sprinter

Personal information
- Nationality: Italian
- Born: 28 February 1908
- Died: 12 March 1997 (aged 89)

Sport
- Sport: Sprinting
- Event: 4 × 400 metres relay

Angelo Ferrario (28 February 1908 – 12 March 1997) was an Italian sprinter. He competed in the men's 4 × 400 metres relay at the 1936 Summer Olympics.
