= Ettore Tavernari =

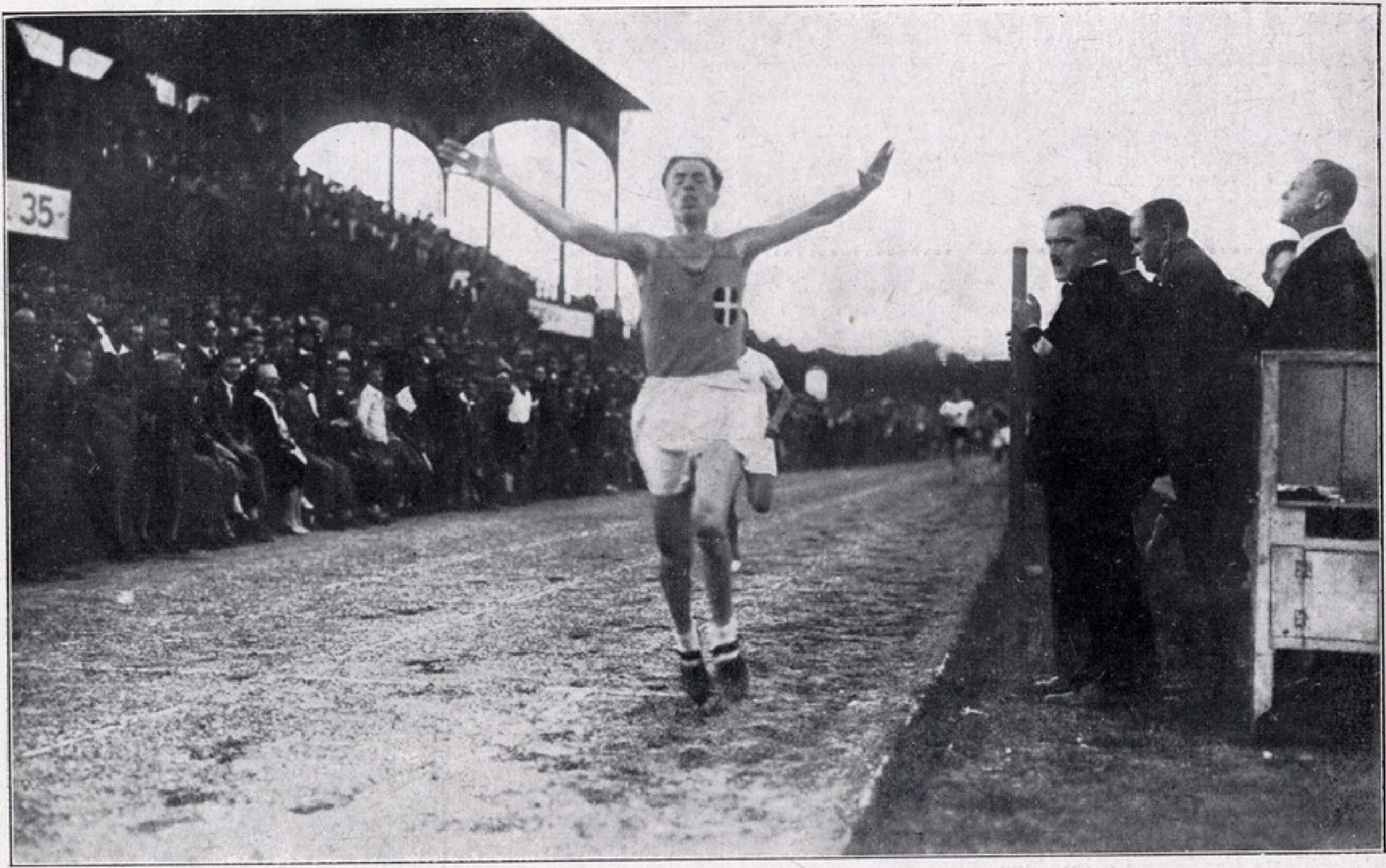
- Ettore Tavernari wins the 800 meters in Prague in July 1927.

Personal information
- Nationality: Italian
- Born: 19 January 1905 Modena, Italy
- Died: 8 October 1981 (aged 76)
- Height: 1.73 m (5 ft 8 in)
- Weight: 65 kg (143 lb)

Sport
- Country: Italy
- Sport: Athletics
- Event(s): 400 metres 800 metres.
- Club: Fratellanza Modena

Achievements and titles
- Personal bests: 400 m: 48.3 (1935); 800 m: 1:52.3 (1929)

Ettore Tavernari (19 January 1905 – 8 October 1981) was an Italian athlete who competed mainly in the 400 metres and 800 metres.

== Biography ==
Tavernari competed for Italy in the 1928 Summer Olympics, he had 22 caps in the national team from 1927 to 1936. He won the individual national championship nine times.

- 5 wins on 400 metres (1928, 1929, 1932, 1934, 1935)
- 4 wins on 800 metres (1927, 1928, 1929, 1932)

== See also ==
- 400 metres winners of Italian Athletics Championships
- 800 metres winners of Italian Athletics Championships
