= 1934 European Athletics Championships =

1st European Athletics Championships
- Dates: 7 – 9 September
- Host city: Turin, Italy
- Venue: Stadio Benito Mussolini
- Level: Senior
- Type: Outdoor
- Events: 22
- Participation: 226 athletes from 23 nations

The 1st European Athletics Championships were held in Turin, Italy, at the Stadio Benito Mussolini between 7 and 9 September 1934. A contemporaneous report on the event was given in the Glasgow Herald.

There were no women's events.

== Medal summary ==
Medalists and complete results were published.

=== Track ===
Event	Gold		Silver		Bronze	
100 metres	Chris Berger; Netherlands	10.6	Erich Borchmeyer; Germany	10.7	József Sir; Hungary	10.7
200 metres	Chris Berger; Netherlands	21.5	József Sir; Hungary	21.5	Tinus Osendarp; Netherlands	21.6
400 metres	Adolf Metzner; Germany	47.9	Pierre Skawinski; France	48.0	Bertil von Wachenfeldt; Sweden	48.0
800 metres	Miklós Szabó; Hungary	1:52.0	Mario Lanzi; Italy	1:52.0	Wolfgang Dessecker; Germany	1:52.2
1500 metres	Luigi Beccali; Italy	3:54.6	Miklós Szabó; Hungary	3:55.2	Roger Normand; France	3:57.0
5000 metres	Roger Rochard; France	14:36.8	Janusz Kusociński; Poland	14:41.2	Ilmari Salminen; Finland	14:43.6
10,000 metres	Ilmari Salminen; Finland	31:02.6	Arvo Askola; Finland	31:03.3	Henry Nielsen; Denmark	31:27.4
Marathon	Armas Toivonen; Finland	2:52:29	Thore Enochsson; Sweden	2:54:36	Aurelio Genghini; Italy	2:55:04
110 metres hurdles	József Kovács; Hungary	14.8	Erwin Wegner; Germany	14.9	Holger Albrechtsen; Norway	15.0
400 metres hurdles	Hans Scheele; Germany	53.2	Akilles Järvinen; Finland	53.7	Christos Mantikas; Greece	54.9
50 kilometres walk	Jānis Daliņš; Latvia	4:49:53	Arthur Tell Schwab; Switzerland	4:53:09	Ettore Rivolta; Italy	4:54:06
4 × 100 metres relay	Germany; Egon Schein; Erwin Gillmeister; Gerd Hornberger; Erich Borchmeyer	41.0	Hungary; László Forgács; József Kovács; József Sir; Gyula Gyenes	41.4	Netherlands; Tinus Osendarp; Tjeerd Boersma; Robert Jansen; Chris Berger	41.6
4 × 400 metres relay	Germany; Helmut Hamann; Hans Scheele; Harry Voigt; Adolf Metzner	3:14.1	France; Robert Paul; Georges Guillez; Raymond Boisset; Pierre Skawinski	3:15.6	Sweden; Sven Strömberg; Pelle Pihl; Gustaf Eriksson; Bertil von Wachenfeldt	3:16.6

=== Field ===
Event	Gold		Silver		Bronze	
High jump	Kalevi Kotkas; Finland	2.00 m	Birger Halvorsen; Norway	1.97 m	Veikko Peräsalo; Finland	1.97 m
Long jump	Wilhelm Leichum; Germany	7.45 m	Otto Berg; Norway	7.31 m	Luz Long; Germany	7.25 m
Pole vault	Gustav Wegner; Germany	4.00 m	Bo Ljungberg; Sweden	4.00 m	John Lindroth; Finland	3.90 m
Triple jump	Willem Peters; Netherlands	14.89 m	Eric Svensson; Sweden	14.83 m	Onni Rajasaari; Finland	14.74 m
Shot put	Arnold Viiding; Estonia	15.19 m	Risto Kuntsi; Finland	15.19 m	František Douda; Czechoslovakia	15.18 m
Discus throw	Harald Andersson; Sweden	50.38 m	Paul Winter; France	47.09 m	István Donogán; Hungary	45.91 m
Javelin throw	Matti Järvinen; Finland	76.66 m WR	Matti Sippala; Finland	69.97 m	Gustav Sule; Estonia	69.31 m
Hammer throw	Ville Pörhölä; Finland	50.34 m	Fernando Vandelli; Italy	48.69 m	Gunnar Jansson; Sweden	47.85 m
Decathlon	Hans-Heinrich Sievert; Germany	6858 pts	Leif Dahlgren; Sweden	6666 pts	Jerzy Pławczyk; Poland	6399 pts

== Medal table ==
Rank	Nation	Gold	Silver	Bronze	Total
1	Germany (GER)	7	2	2	11
2	Finland (FIN)	5	4	4	13
3	Netherlands (NED)	3	0	2	5
4	Hungary (HUN)	2	3	2	7
5	Sweden (SWE)	1	4	3	8
6	France (FRA)	1	3	1	5
7	Italy (ITA)	1	2	2	5
8	Estonia (EST)	1	0	1	2
9	Latvia (LAT)	1	0	0	1
10	Norway (NOR)	0	2	1	3
11	Poland (POL)	0	1	1	2
12	Switzerland (SUI)	0	1	0	1
13	Czechoslovakia (TCH)	0	0	1	1
13	Denmark (DEN)	0	0	1	1
13	Greece (GRE)	0	0	1	1
Totals (15 entries)		22	22	22	66

== Participation ==
According to an unofficial count, 223 athletes from 23 countries participated in the event, three athletes less than the official number as published.

- Austria (6)
- Belgium (3)
- Bulgaria (2)
- Czechoslovakia (13)
- Denmark (2)
- Estonia (7)
- Finland (20)
- France (18)
- Germany (27)
- Greece (2)
- Hungary (17)
- Italy (41)
- Latvia (6)
- Lithuania (3)
- Luxembourg (4)
- Netherlands (8)
- Norway (4)
- Poland (5)
- Portugal (1)
- Romania (1)
- Sweden (18)
- Switzerland (11)
- Yugoslavia (4)
