= Athletics at the 1936 Summer Olympics – Men's 4 × 100 metres relay =

Men's 4 × 100 metre relay at the Games of the XI Olympiad
- Venue: Olympiastadion: Berlin, Germany
- Dates: August 9, 1936 (heats, final)
- Competitors: from 15 nations
- Teams: 15
- Winning time: 39.8

Medalists
1st place, gold medalist(s)		Jesse Owens; Ralph Metcalfe; Foy Draper; Frank Wykoff	United States
2nd place, silver medalist(s)		Orazio Mariani; Gianni Caldana; Elio Ragni; Tullio Gonnelli	Italy
3rd place, bronze medalist(s)		Wilhelm Leichum; Erich Borchmeyer; Erwin Gillmeister; Gerd Hornberger	Germany

The men's 4 × 100 metres relay event at the 1936 Olympic Games took place on August 9. The United States team of Jesse Owens, Ralph Metcalfe, Foy Draper and Frank Wykoff won in a world record time of 39.8.

On the day before the 4×100-meter relay event at the 1936 Berlin Olympics, U.S. track coaches Lawson Robertson and Dean Cromwell altered the team's lineup. They removed Marty Glickman and Sam Stoller–two Jewish-American athletes—and replaced them with African-American sprinters Jesse Owens and Ralph Metcalfe. The adjusted American squad (Owens, Metcalfe, Foy Draper, and Frank Wykoff) subsequently won the gold medal and set a world record time of 39.8 seconds. Owens won his fourth and final gold medal, capping off a unique achievement at these Games.

Coach Lawson Robertson officially justified the choice by stating that the team needed its fastest possible sprinters because the German host nation was allegedly hiding its best runners to stage an upset victory. Modern historians, as well as Glickman himself, view the decision as an act of political appeasement directed by Olympic officials, notably Avery Brundage. Critics argue that Brundage and Cromwell sought to prevent the domestic embarrassment of the Nazi regime, while Stoller noted the decision as a severe professional disappointment in his diaries but did not attribute it to antisemitism.

== Results ==
=== Heats ===
The fastest two teams in each of the three heats advanced to the final round.

=== Heat 1 ===
Rank	Country	Competitors	Time	Notes
1	United States	Jesse Owens, Ralph Metcalfe, Foy Draper, Frank Wykoff	40.0	=WR
2	Italy	Orazio Mariani, Gianni Caldana, Elio Ragni, Tullio Gonnelli	41.1	
3	South Africa	Eric Grimbeek, Pat Dannaher, Tom Lavery, Marthinus Theunissen	41.7	
4	Finland	Toivo Ahjopalo, Toivo Sariola, Palle Virtanen, Aki Tammisto	42.0	
	Japan	Takayoshi Yoshioka, Monta Suzuki, Mutsuo Taniguchi, Masao Yazawa		DSQ

=== Heat 2 ===
Rank	Country	Athletes	Time	Notes
1	Netherlands	Tjeerd Boersma, Wil van Beveren, Chris Berger, Tinus Osendarp	41.3	
2	Argentina	Juan Lavenás, Antonio Sande, Carlos Hofmeister, Tomás Beswick	41.9	
3	Hungary	Mario Minai, Gyula Gyenes, József Kovács, József Sir	42.0	
4	Great Britain	Charles Wiard, Don Finlay, Walter Rangeley, Alan Pennington	42.4	
5	France	Maurice Carlton, Pierre Dondelinger, Paul Bronner, Robert Paul	42.6	
6	Republic of China	Poh Kimseng, Huang Yingjie, Chen Kingkwan, Liu Changchun	44.8	

=== Heat 3 ===
Rank	Country	Athletes	Time	Notes
1	Germany	Wilhelm Leichum, Erich Borchmeyer, Erwin Gillmeister, Gerd Hornberger	41.4	
2	Canada	Sam Richardson, Bruce Humber, Lee Orr, Howard McPhee	41.5	
3	Sweden	Lennart Lindgren, Irvin Ternström, Östen Sandström, Åke Stenqvist	41.5	
4	Switzerland	Albert Jud, Bernard Marchand, Georges Meyer, Paul Hänni	42.2	

=== Final ===
Rank	Country	Athletes	Time	Notes
1st place, gold medalist(s)	United States	Jesse Owens, Ralph Metcalfe, Foy Draper, Frank Wykoff	39.8	WR
2nd place, silver medalist(s)	Italy	Orazio Mariani, Gianni Caldana, Elio Ragni, Tullio Gonnelli	41.1	
3rd place, bronze medalist(s)	Germany	Wilhelm Leichum, Erich Borchmeyer, Erwin Gillmeister, Gerd Hornberger	41.2	
4	Argentina	Juan Lavenás, Antonio Sande, Carlos Hofmeister, Tomás Beswick	42.2	
5	Canada	Sam Richardson, Bruce Humber, Lee Orr, Howard McPhee	42.7	
	Netherlands	Tjeerd Boersma, Wil van Beveren, Chris Berger, Tinus Osendarp		DSQ

Key: DSQ = Disqualified, WR = World record
