= Athletics at the 1936 Summer Olympics – Men's 200 metres =

Men's 200 metres at the Games of the XI Olympiad
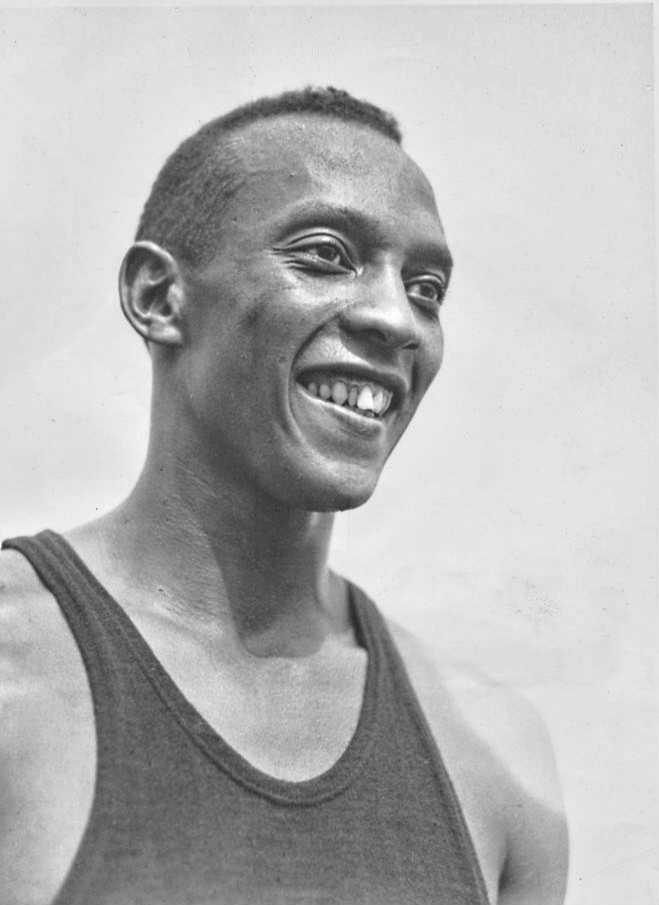
- Jesse Owens
- Venue: Olympiastadion: Berlin, Germany
- Dates: August 4, 1936 (heats and quarterfinals); August 5, 1936 (semifinals and final)
- Competitors: 44 from 23 nations
- Winning time: 20.7 WR

Medalists
1st place, gold medalist(s)		Jesse Owens; United States
2nd place, silver medalist(s)		Mack Robinson; United States
3rd place, bronze medalist(s)		Tinus Osendarp; Netherlands

The men's 200 metres sprint event at the 1936 Olympic Games took place between August 4 and August 5. There were 44 athletes from 22 nations competing. The maximum number of athletes per nation had been set at 3 since the 1930 Olympic Congress. The final was won by 0.4 seconds by American Jesse Owens, with silver going to Mack Robinson (brother of baseball's Jackie Robinson). Owens thus reached 3 gold medals in 1936 (along with the 100 metres and long jump), with the sprint relay still to come. The Netherlands earned its first medal in the men's 200 metres with Tinus Osendarp's bronze.

== Background ==
This was the ninth appearance of the event, which was not held at the first Olympics in 1896 but has been on the program ever since. None of the six finalists from the 1932 Games returned. Jesse Owens was the favorite coming into the Games. He had already won both the 100 metres and the long jump in Berlin.

Liechtenstein made its debut in the event. The United States made its ninth appearance, the only nation to have competed at each edition of the 200 metres to date.

== Competition format ==
The competition used the four round format introduced in 1920: heats, quarterfinals, semifinals, and a final. There were 8 heats of between 4 and 6 runners each, with the top 3 men in each advancing to the quarterfinals. The quarterfinals consisted of 4 heats of 6 athletes each; the 3 fastest men in each heat advanced to the semifinals. There were 2 semifinals, each with 6 runners. Again, the top 3 athletes advanced. The final had 6 runners. The races were run on a now-standard 400 metre track.

== Records ==
Prior to this competition, the existing world and Olympic records were as follows:

World record		20.6^{*}		
Olympic record	Eddie Tolan (USA)	21.2	Los Angeles, United States	3 August 1932

^{*}On straightaway. No world record existed for running on a curve.

Jesse Owens set a new Olympic record in the third heat, running in 21.1 seconds. He repeated that performance in the third quarterfinal. Mack Robinson matched Owens' new record in the first semifinal, and again in the final—but Owens finished with a time of 20.7 seconds in the final to lower the Olympic record and set an unofficial world record for curved-track running.

== Schedule ==
Date	Time	Round
Tuesday, 4 August 1936	10:30; 15:30	Heats; Quarterfinals
Wednesday, 5 August 1936	15:00; 18:00	Semifinals; Final

== Results ==
=== Heats ===
The fastest three runners in each of the eight heats advanced to the quarterfinal round.

==== Heat 1 ====
Rank	Athlete	Nation	Time	Notes
1	Wil van Beveren	Netherlands	21.4	Q
2	Tomás Beswick	Argentina	22.1	Q
3	Mutsuo Taniguchi	Japan	22.2	Q
4	Antonio Salcedo	Philippines	Unknown	
5	José de Almeida	Brazil	Unknown	
6	Aristidis Sakellariou	Greece	Unknown	

==== Heat 2 ====
Rank	Athlete	Nation	Time	Notes
1	Tinus Osendarp	Netherlands	21.7	Q
2	Egon Schein	Germany	22.0	Q
3	Alan Pennington	Great Britain	22.1	Q
4	Masao Yazawa	Japan	22.4	
5	Pierre Dondelinger	France	Unknown	
6	Xaver Frick	Liechtenstein	Unknown	

==== Heat 3 ====
Rank	Athlete	Nation	Time	Notes
1	Jesse Owens	United States	21.1	Q, OR
2	Lee Orr	Canada	21.6	Q
3	Karl Neckermann	Germany	21.8	Q
4	Arthur Sweeney	Great Britain	22.1	
5	Nemesio de Guzman	Philippines	22.9	
6	Gunnar Christensen	Denmark	23.1	

==== Heat 4 ====
Rank	Athlete	Nation	Time	Notes
1	Bruce Humber	Canada	22.1	Q
2	Gyula Gyenes	Hungary	22.1	Q
3	Felix Rinner	Austria	22.4	Q
4	Paul Bronner	France	22.6	
5	Chen Kingkwan	Republic of China	Unknown	

==== Heat 5 ====
Rank	Athlete	Nation	Time	Notes
1	Paul Hänni	Switzerland	21.9	Q
2	Renos Frangoudis	Greece	22.1	Q
3	József Sir	Hungary	22.2	Q
4	Poh Kimseng	Republic of China	Unknown	
5	Pat Dannaher	South Africa	Unknown	

==== Heat 6 ====
Rank	Athlete	Nation	Time	Notes
1	Marthinus Theunissen	South Africa	21.7	Q
2	Howard McPhee	Canada	21.8	Q
3	Börje Strandvall	Finland	22.6	Q
4	George Fahoum	Egypt	Unknown	
5	Liu Changchun	Republic of China	Unknown	
6	Antonio Fondevilla	Argentina	Unknown	

==== Heat 7 ====
Rank	Athlete	Nation	Time	Notes
1	Bob Packard	United States	21.2	Q
2	Eric Grimbeek	South Africa	21.8	Q
3	Albert Steinmetz	Germany	21.9	Q
4	Eric Whiteside	India	Unknown	

==== Heat 8 ====
Rank	Athlete	Nation	Time	Notes
1	Mack Robinson	United States	21.6	Q
2	Aki Tammisto	Finland	22.2	Q
3	Carlos Hofmeister	Argentina	22.3	Q
4	Dieudonné Devrindt	Belgium	Unknown	
5	Mario Minai	Hungary	Unknown	
6	Alfred König	Austria	Unknown	

=== Quarterfinals ===
The fastest three runners in each of the four heats advanced to the semifinal round.

==== Quarterfinal 1 ====
Rank	Athlete	Nation	Time	Notes
1	Lee Orr	Canada	21.2	Q
2	Paul Hänni	Switzerland	21.3	Q
3	Bob Packard	United States	21.3	Q
4	József Sir	Hungary	21.6	
5	Egon Schein	Germany	21.7	
6	Tomás Beswick	Argentina	Unknown	

==== Quarterfinal 2 ====
Rank	Athlete	Nation	Time	Notes
1	Wil van Beveren	Netherlands	21.7	Q
2	Marthinus Theunissen	South Africa	21.9	Q
3	Bruce Humber	Canada	22.1	Q
4	Renos Frangoudis	Greece	Unknown	
5	Mutsuo Taniguchi	Japan	Unknown	
6	Carlos Hofmeister	Argentina	Unknown	

==== Quarterfinal 3 ====
Rank	Athlete	Nation	Time	Notes
1	Jesse Owens	United States	21.1	Q, =OR
2	Howard McPhee	Canada	21.8	Q
3	Eric Grimbeek	South Africa	21.9	Q
4	Aki Tammisto	Finland	22.0	
5	Felix Rinner	Austria	Unknown	
—	Albert Steinmetz	Germany	DSQ	

==== Quarterfinal 4 ====
Rank	Athlete	Nation	Time	Notes
1	Mack Robinson	United States	21.2	Q
2	Tinus Osendarp	Netherlands	21.3	Q
3	Karl Neckermann	Germany	21.6	Q
4	Gyula Gyenes	Hungary	Unknown	
5	Börje Strandvall	Finland	Unknown	
—	Alan Pennington	Great Britain	DNS	

=== Semifinals ===
The fastest three runners in each of the two heats advanced to the final round.

==== Semifinal 1 ====
Rank	Athlete	Nation	Time	Notes
1	Mack Robinson	United States	21.1	Q, =OR
2	Lee Orr	Canada	21.3	Q
3	Wil van Beveren	Netherlands	21.5	Q
4	Bob Packard	United States	21.6	
5	Karl Neckermann	Germany	21.8	
6	Eric Grimbeek	South Africa	22.2	

==== Semifinal 2 ====
Rank	Athlete	Nation	Time	Notes
1	Jesse Owens	United States	21.3	Q
2	Tinus Osendarp	Netherlands	21.5	Q
3	Paul Hänni	Switzerland	21.6	Q
4	Marthinus Theunissen	South Africa	21.8	
5	Bruce Humber	Canada	22.0	
6	Howard McPhee	Canada	22.0	

=== Final ===
Rank	Athlete	Nation	Time	Notes
1st place, gold medalist(s)	Jesse Owens	United States	20.7	WR
2nd place, silver medalist(s)	Mack Robinson	United States	21.1	
3rd place, bronze medalist(s)	Tinus Osendarp	Netherlands	21.3	
4	Paul Hänni	Switzerland	21.6	
5	Lee Orr	Canada	21.6	
6	Wil van Beveren	Netherlands	21.9	
