= Canada at the 1936 Summer Olympics =

- IOC code: CAN
- NOC: Canadian Olympic Committee

in Berlin, Germany August 1–16, 1936
- Competitors: 97 in 12 sports
- Flag bearer: James Worrall
- Medals Ranked 17th: Gold 1 Silver 3 Bronze 5 Total 9

Summer Olympics appearances (overview)
- 1900; 1904; 1908; 1912; 1920; 1924; 1928; 1932; 1936; 1948; 1952; 1956; 1960; 1964; 1968; 1972; 1976; 1980; 1984; 1988; 1992; 1996; 2000; 2004; 2008; 2012; 2016; 2020; 2024

Other related appearances
- 1906 Intercalated Games

Canada competed at the 1936 Summer Olympics in Berlin, Germany. 97 competitors, 79 men and 18 women, took part in 69 events in 12 sports.

In preparation for the Olympics, Canadian Olympic Committee secretary-treasurer Fred Marples urged for branches of the Amateur Athletic Union of Canada (AAU of C) to raise funds to make the Canadian Olympic team as large as it could be. He stated that the Government of Canada would contribute C$10,000 towards the national team, and that the Olympic Committee sought to maximize profits from the 1936 Canadian Track and Field Championships to provide additional funding for the Olympic team.

The flag of Canada was carried at the opening ceremony of the 1936 Olympic Games by James Worrall.

AAU of C president W. A. Fry self-published a book covering Canadian achievements at the 1936 Winter Olympics and 1936 Summer Olympics. His 1936 book, Canada at eleventh Olympiad 1936 in Germany : Garmisch-Partenkirchen, February 6th to 13th, Berlin, August 1st to 16th, was printed by the Dunnville Chronicle presses and subtitled an official report of the Canadian Olympic Committee. He wrote that Canadians did very well at the 1936 Olympic games despite having one-tenth of the population of other countries. He opined that the length of the Canadian winter negatively affected summer training, and that Canadian athletes were underfunded compared to other countries.

== Medallists ==
=== Gold ===
- Frank Amyot – Canoeing, men's C-1 1000m

=== Silver ===
- Gordon Aitchison, Ian Allison, Arthur Chapman, Chuck Chapman, Edward Dawson, Irving Meretsky, Stanley Nantais, James Stewart, Malcolm Wiseman, Doug Peden – Basketball, men's team competition
- John Loaring – Athletics, men's 400m hurdles
- Frank Saker and Harvey Charters – Canoeing, men's C-2 10000m

=== Bronze ===
- Dorothy Brookshaw, Mildred Dolson, Hilda Cameron, Aileen Meagher – Athletics, women's 4 × 100 m relay
- Elizabeth Taylor – Athletics, women's 80m hurdles
- Phil Edwards —Athletics, men's 800 metres
- Frank Saker and Harvey Charters – Canoeing, men's C-2 1000m
- Joseph Schleimer – Wrestling, men's freestyle welterweight (66–72 kg)

== Athletics ==
Key

- Note–Ranks given for track events are within the athlete's heat only
- Q = Qualified for the next round

Men
Track & road events

| Athlete | Event | Heat | | Quarterfinal | | Semifinal | | Final | |
| Athlete | Event | Result | Rank | Result | Rank | Result | Rank | Result | Rank |
|---|---|---|---|---|---|---|---|---|---|
| Howard McPhee | 100 m | 10.8 | 1 Q | 10.6 | 3 Q | 10.7 | 4 | Did not advance | |
| Bruce Humber | 100 m | 10.8 | 2 Q | Unknown | 5 | Did not advance | | | |
| Lee Orr | 100 m | 10.6 | 3 | Did not advance | | | | | |
| Lee Orr | 200 m | 21.6 | 2 Q | 21.2 | 1 Q | 21.3 | 2 Q | 21.6 | 5 |
| Bruce Humber | 200 m | 22.1 | 1 Q | 22.1 | 3 Q | 22.0 | 5 | Did not advance | |
| Howard McPhee | 200 m | 21.8 | 2 Q | 21.8 | 2 Q | 22.0 | 6 | Did not advance | |
| John Loaring | 400 m | 49.1 | 3 Q | 49.3 | 3 Q | 48.1 | 3 Q | 48.2 | 6 |
| Marshall Limon | 400 m | 49.2 | 2 Q | 48.9 | 5 | Did not advance | | | |
| William Fritz | 400 m | 49.0 | 2 Q | 48.4 | 3 Q | 47.4 | 3 Q | 47.8 | 5 |
| Phil Edwards | 800 m | 1:53.7 | 1 Q | —N/a | | 1:53.2 | 3 Q | 1:53.6 | 3rd place, bronze medalist(s) |
| Ab Conway | 800 m | 1:56.2 | 2 Q | —N/a | | 1:55.9 | 5 | Did not advance | |
| Jack Liddle | 800 m | Unknown | 7 | —N/a | | Did not advance | | | |
| Jack Liddle | 1500 m | —N/a | | | | Unknown | 9 | Did not advance | |
| Phil Edwards | 1500 m | —N/a | | | | 3:56.2 | 3 Q | 3:50.4 | 5 |
| Hugh Thompson | 1500 m | —N/a | | | | Unknown | 9 | Did not advance | |
| Scotty Rankine | 5000 m | Unknown | 10 | —N/a | | | | Did not advance | |
| Milton Wallace | 5000 m | Unknown | 11 | —N/a | | | | Did not advance | |
| Scotty Rankine | 10,000 m | —N/a | | | | | | Unknown | |
| Milton Wallace | 10,000 m | —N/a | | | | | | Unknown | |
| Larry O'Connor | 110 m hurdles | 15.1 | 2 Q | —N/a | | 15.0 | 3 | 14.8 | 6 |
| Jim Worrall | 110 m hurdles | 15.6 | 3 | —N/a | | Did not advance | | | |
| Jim Worrall | 400 m hurdles | 55.5 | 4 | —N/a | | Did not advance | | | |
| John Loaring | 400 m hurdles | 54.3 | 2 Q | —N/a | | 53.1 | 2 Q | 52.7 | 2nd place, silver medalist(s) |
| Sam Richardson; Bruce Humber; Lee Orr; Howard McPhee | 4 × 100 m relay | 41.5 | 2 | —N/a | | | | 42.7 | 5 |
| Marshall Limon; Phil Edwards; Bill Fritz; Johnny Loaring | 4 × 400 m relay | 3:15.0 | 2 | —N/a | | | | 3:11.8 | 4 |
| Jimmy Bartlett | Marathon | —N/a | | | | | | 2:48:21.4 | 15 |
| Percy Wyer | Marathon | —N/a | | | | | | 3:00:11.0 | 30 |
| Harold Webster | Marathon | —N/a | | | | | | DNF | |
| Vincent Callard | Marathon | —N/a | | | | | | DNS | |

Field events

| Athlete | Event | Qualification | | Final | |
| Athlete | Event | Result | Rank | Result | Rank |
|---|---|---|---|---|---|
| Sam Richardson | Long jump | >=7.15 | Q | Did not advance | |
| Sam Richardson | Triple jump | Unknown | Q | 14.21 | 20 |
| Joe Haley | High jump | 1.85 | 1 Q | 1.85 | 12 |
| Syl Apps | Pole vault | 3.80 | 1 Q | 4.00 | 5 |
| Jim Courtright | Javelin throw | 60.3 | 15 Q | 60.54 | 14 |

Women
Track & road events

| Athlete | Event | Heat | | Semifinal | | Final | |
| Athlete | Event | Result | Rank | Result | Rank | Result | Rank |
|---|---|---|---|---|---|---|---|
| Hilda Cameron | 100 m | 12.7 | 3 | Did not advance | | | |
| Jeanette Dolson | 100 m | 12.3 | 2 Q | Unknown | 5 | Did not advance | |
| Aileen Meagher | 100 m | 12.4 | 2 Q | Unknown | 5 | Did not advance | |
| Betty Taylor | 80 m hurdles | 12.0 | 1 | 11.7 | 2 | 11.7 | 3rd place, bronze medalist(s) |
| Roxy Atkins | 80 m hurdles | Unknown | 4 | Did not advance | | | |
| Dorothy Brookshaw; Jeanette Dolson; Hilda Cameron; Aileen Meagher | 4 × 100 m relay | 48.0 | 2 Q | —N/a | | 47.8 | 3rd place, bronze medalist(s) |

Field events

| Athlete | Event | Qualification | | Final | |
| Athlete | Event | Result | Rank | Result | Rank |
|---|---|---|---|---|---|
| Margaret Bell | High jump | —N/a | | 1.50 | 9 |

== Cycling ==
Six cyclists, all male, represented Canada in 1936.

Individual road race

- Lionel Coleman
- George Crompton
- Rusty Peden
- George Turner

Team road race

- Lionel Coleman
- George Crompton
- Rusty Peden
- George Turner

Sprint

- Doug Peace

Time trial

- Bob McLeod

Team pursuit

- Lionel Coleman
- George Crompton
- Bob McLeod
- George Turner

== Diving ==
Men

| Athlete | Event | Final | |
| Athlete | Event | Points | Rank |
|---|---|---|---|
| George Athans | 10 m platform | 70.06 | 25 |

Women

| Athlete | Event | Final | |
| Athlete | Event | Points | Rank |
|---|---|---|---|
| Lynda Adams | 3 m springboard | 67.44 | 10 |
| Thelma Boughner | 3 m springboard | 60.04 | 15 |
| Lynda Adams | 10 m platform | 26.52 | 19 |
| Thelma Boughner | 10 m platform | 24.30 | 22 |

== Fencing ==
Eight fencers, five men and three women, represented Canada in 1936.

Men's foil

- Charles Otis
- Ernest Dalton
- Don Collinge

Men's team foil

- Bertrand Boissonnault, Don Collinge, George Tully, Charles Otis, Ernest Dalton

Men's épée

- George Tully
- Ernest Dalton
- Bertrand Boissonnault

Men's team épée

- Don Collinge, Ernest Dalton, Charles Otis, George Tully

Men's sabre

- George Tully
- Don Collinge
- Charles Otis

Men's team sabre

- Ernest Dalton, Charles Otis, George Tully, Don Collinge

Women's foil

- Aileen Thomas
- Nancy Archibald
- Kathleen Hughes-Hallett

== Rowing ==
Canada had ten rowers participate in two out of seven rowing events in 1936.

Men's single sculls

- Charles Campbell

Men's eight

- Cedric Liddell
- Grey McLeish
- Joseph Harris
- Ben Sharpe
- Jack Cunningham
- Charles Matteson
- Harry Fry
- Sandy Saunders
- Les MacDonald (cox)

== Swimming ==
Men

Ranks given are within the heat.

| Athlete | Event | Heat | | Semifinal | | Final | |
| Athlete | Event | Time | Rank | Time | Rank | Time | Rank |
|---|---|---|---|---|---|---|---|
| Munroe Bourne | 100 m freestyle | 1:02.4 | 4 | Did not advance | | | |
| Bob Hamerton | 100 m freestyle | 1:02.1 | 4 | Did not advance | | | |
| George Larson | 100 m freestyle | 1:01.5 | 3 | Did not advance | | | |
| Bob Hamerton | 400 m freestyle | 5:13.3 | 4 | Did not advance | | | |
| Robert Hooper | 400 m freestyle | 5:17.2 | 6 | Did not advance | | | |
| Bob Pirie | 400 m freestyle | 4:56.0 | 3 q | 4:58.7 | 6 | Did not advance | |
| Bob Hamerton | 1500 m freestyle | 21:05.5 | 5 | Did not advance | | | |
| Robert Hooper | 1500 m freestyle | 21:47.4 | 4 | Did not advance | | | |
| Bob Pirie | 1500 m freestyle | 20:16.4 | 4 q | 20:17.3 | 6 | Did not advance | |
| Munroe Bourne | 100 m backstroke | 1:17.2 | 6 | Did not advance | | | |
| Gordon Kerr | 100 m backstroke | 1:12.9 | 2 Q | 1:11.2 | 5 | Did not advance | |
| Gerald Clawson | 200 m breaststroke | 2:54.7 | 2 Q | 2:55.6 | 8 | Did not advance | |
| Albert Puddy | 200 m breaststroke | 3:10.2 | 6 | Did not advance | | | |
| Munroe Bourne; Bob Hamerton; Robert Hooper; Bob Pirie | 4 × 200 m freestyle relay | —N/a | | 9:40.0 | 2 Q | 9:27.5 | 7 |

Women

Ranks given are within the heat.

| Athlete | Event | Heat | | Semifinal | | Final | |
| Athlete | Event | Time | Rank | Time | Rank | Time | Rank |
|---|---|---|---|---|---|---|---|
| Phyllis Dewar | 100 m freestyle | 1:09.2 | 4 q | 1:09.6 | 6 | Did not advance | |
| Irene Pirie-Milton | 100 m freestyle | 1:12.8 | 5 | Did not advance | | | |
| Margaret Stone | 100 m freestyle | 1:10.0 | 3 Q | 1:12.8 | 7 | Did not advance | |
| Mary McConkey | 100 m backstroke | 1:25.3 | 5 | Did not advance | | | |
| Noel Oxenbury | 100 m backstroke | 1:28.9 | 7 | Did not advance | | | |
| Joan Langdon | 200 m breaststroke | 3:24.3 | 7 | Did not advance | | | |
| Mary McConkey; Irene Pirie-Milton; Margaret Stone; Phyllis Dewar | 4 × 100 m freestyle relay | —N/a | | 4:49.7 | 3 Q | 4:48.0 | =4 |
