= 1938 European Athletics Championships – Men's 4 × 100 metres relay =

Men's 4 × 100 metres relay at the European Athletics Championships

The men's 4 × 100 metres relay at the 1938 European Athletics Championships was held in Paris, France, at Stade Olympique de Colombes on 5 September 1938.

== Medalists ==
Gold	Manfred Kersch; Gerd Hornberger; Karl Neckermann; Jakob Scheuring; Germany
Silver	Gösta Klemming; Åke Stenqvist; Lennart Lindgren; Lennart Strandberg; Sweden
Bronze	Maurice Scarr; Godfrey Brown; Arthur Sweeney; Ernest Page; Great Britain

== Results ==
=== Final ===
5 September

Rank	Nation	Competitors	Time	Notes
1st place, gold medalist(s)	Germany	Manfred Kersch; Gerd Hornberger; Karl Neckermann; Jakob Scheuring	40.9	CR
2nd place, silver medalist(s)	Sweden	Gösta Klemming; Åke Stenqvist; Lennart Lindgren; Lennart Strandberg	41.1	
3rd place, bronze medalist(s)	Great Britain	Maurice Scarr; Godfrey Brown; Arthur Sweeney; Ernest Page	41.2	
4	Italy	Tullio Gonnelli; Gianni Caldana; Edoardo Daelli; Orazio Mariani	41.3	
	Netherlands	Martinus Osendarp; Wijnand van Beveren; Tjeerd Boersma; Heinz Baumgarten	DNF	
	Switzerland	Fritz Seeger; Jean Studer; Bernard Marchand; Paul Hanni	DQ	

=== Heats ===
5 September

==== Heat 1 ====
Rank	Nation	Competitors	Time	Notes
1	Germany	Manfred Kersch; Gerd Hornberger; Karl Neckermann; Jakob Scheuring	41.1	Q
2	Great Britain	Maurice Scarr; Godfrey Brown; Arthur Sweeney; Ernest Page	41.4	Q
3	Sweden	Gösta Klemming; Åke Stenqvist; Lennart Lindgren; Lennart Strandberg	42.0	Q
4	France	Victor Goldowski; Oscar Stolz; André Dessus; Jean Jourdian	42.2	

==== Heat 2 ====
Rank	Nation	Competitors	Time	Notes
1	Italy	Tullio Gonnelli; Gianni Caldana; Edoardo Daelli; Orazio Mariani	42.1	Q
2	Switzerland	Fritz Seeger; Jean Studer; Bernard Marchand; Paul Hanni	42.3	Q
3	Netherlands	Martinus Osendarp; Wijnand van Beveren; Tjeerd Boersma; Heinz Baumgarten	42.4	Q
4	Hungary	Gyula Gyenes; János Paizs; József Kovács; József Sir	42.8	

== Participation ==
According to an unofficial count, 32 athletes from 8 countries participated in the event.

- France (4)
- Germany (4)
- Hungary (4)
- Italy (4)
- Netherlands (4)
- Sweden (4)
- Switzerland (4)
- Great Britain (4)
