= Athletics at the 1936 Summer Olympics – Men's 100 metres =

Men's 100 metres at the Games of the XI Olympiad
- Venue: Olympiastadion; Berlin, Germany
- Dates: 2 August 1936 (heats, quarterfinals); 3 August 1936 (semifinals, final)
- Competitors: 63 from 30 nations
- Winning time: 10.3

Medalists
1st place, gold medalist(s)		Jesse Owens	United States
2nd place, silver medalist(s)		Ralph Metcalfe	United States
3rd place, bronze medalist(s)		Tinus Osendarp	Netherlands

The men's 100 metres sprint event at the 1936 Olympic Games in Berlin, Germany, were held at Olympiastadion on 2 and 3 August. The final was won by 0.1 seconds by American Jesse Owens, and teammate Ralph Metcalfe repeated as silver medalist. Tinus Osendarp of the Netherlands won that nation's first medal in the men's 100 metres, a bronze.

== Background ==
This was the tenth time the event was held, having appeared at every Olympics since the first in 1896. Two finalists from 1932 returned: silver medalist Ralph Metcalfe and 6th-place finisher Takayoshi Yoshioka. The favorite, however, was Jesse Owens, particularly with compatriot Eulace Peacock injured and unable to make the team (Owens had come in third to Peacock and Metcalfe at the 1935 AAU meet).

Afghanistan, Colombia, Liechtenstein, Malta, Peru, and Yugoslavia were represented in the event for the first time. The United States was the only nation to have appeared at each of the first ten Olympic men's 100 metres events.

== Competition format ==
The event retained the four round format from 1920–1932: heats, quarterfinals, semifinals, and a final. There were 12 heats, of 4–6 athletes each, with the top 2 in each heat advancing to the quarterfinals. The 24 quarterfinalists were placed into 4 heats of 6 athletes. The top 3 in each quarterfinal advanced to the semifinals. There were 2 heats of 6 semifinalists, once again with the top 3 advancing to the 6-man final.

== Records ==
These are the standing world and Olympic records (in seconds) prior to the 1932 Summer Olympics.

World record	10.2	(United States) Jesse Owens	Chicago, USA	June 20, 1936
Olympic Record	10.3	(United States) Eddie Tolan	Los Angeles, USA	August 1, 1932
Olympic Record	10.3	(United States) Ralph Metcalfe	Los Angeles, USA	August 1, 1932

Jesse Owens equalled the standing Olympic record with 10.3 seconds in the final heat of the first round. He matched his own world record of 10.2 seconds, set two months earlier, in the quarterfinals but this result was not counted for records purposes due to wind assistance. His final run, also disqualified from record consideration due to wind, again matched the Olympic record of 10.3 seconds.

== Results ==
=== Heats ===
The fastest two runners in each of the twelve heats advanced to the quarterfinal round.

==== Heat 1 ====
Rank	Athlete	Nation	Time	Notes
1	Lennart Strandberg	Sweden	10.7	Q
2	Takayoshi Yoshioka	Japan	10.8	Q
3	Manfred Kersch	Germany	10.8	
4	Maurice Carlton	France		
5	Aristidis Sakellariou	Greece		

==== Heat 2 ====
Rank	Athlete	Nation	Time	Notes
1	Chris Berger	Netherlands	10.8	Q
2	Pat Dannaher	South Africa	11.0	Q
3	Bernard Marchand	Switzerland	11.2	
4	Antonio Sande	Argentina	11.2	
5	Julije Bauer	Yugoslavia	11.5	

==== Heat 3 ====
Rank	Athlete	Nation	Time	Notes
1	Wil van Beveren	Netherlands	10.8	Q
2	Eric Grimbeek	South Africa	10.9	Q
3	Ruudi Toomsalu	Estonia	11.0	
4	Antonio Salcedo	Philippines		
5	José Domingo Sánchez	Colombia		
6	Mohammad Khan	Afghanistan		

==== Heat 4 ====
Rank	Athlete	Nation	Time	Notes
1	Gyula Gyenes	Hungary	10.7	Q
2	Monta Suzuki	Japan	10.7	Q
3	Palle Virtanen	Finland	10.9	
4	Paul Bronner	France	11.1	
5	Antonio Cuba	Peru		
6	Elias Gutiérrez	Colombia		

==== Heat 5 ====
Rank	Athlete	Nation	Time	Notes
1	Howard McPhee	Canada	10.8	Q
2	Lennart Lindgren	Sweden	10.8	Q
3	Robert Paul	France	11.0	
4	George Fahoum	Egypt		
5	Poh Kimseng	Republic of China		

==== Heat 6 ====
Rank	Athlete	Nation	Time	Notes
1	Marthinus Theunissen	South Africa	10.7	Q
2	Gerd Hornberger	Germany	10.7	Q
3	Tomás Beswick	Argentina	10.9	
4	Toivo Sariola	Finland		
5	Sveinn Ingvarsson	Iceland		
6	Oskar Ospelt	Liechtenstein		

==== Heat 7 ====
Rank	Athlete	Nation	Time	Notes
1	Ralph Metcalfe	United States	10.8	Q
2	József Sir	Hungary	10.8	Q
3	Nemesio de Guzman	Philippines	11.1	
4	Fritz Seeger	Switzerland		

==== Heat 8 ====
Rank	Athlete	Nation	Time	Notes
1	Erich Borchmeyer	Germany	10.7	Q
2	Bruce Humber	Canada	10.8	Q
3	Gábor Gerő	Hungary	11.3	
4	Chen Kingkwan	Republic of China		
5	Alfred Bencini	Malta		

==== Heat 9 ====
Rank	Athlete	Nation	Time	Notes
1	Frank Wykoff	United States	10.6	Q
2	Arthur Sweeney	Great Britain	10.7	Q
3	Antonio Fondevilla	Argentina	11.0	
4	Toivo Ahjopalo	Finland		
5	Oswaldo Domingues	Brazil		
6	Xaver Frick	Liechtenstein		

==== Heat 10 ====
Rank	Athlete	Nation	Time	Notes
1	Tinus Osendarp	Netherlands	10.5	Q
2	Alan Pennington	Great Britain	10.6	Q
3	Lee Orr	Canada	10.6	
4	Robert Struckl	Austria		
5	Eric Whiteside	India		

==== Heat 11 ====
Rank	Athlete	Nation	Time	Notes
1	Paul Hänni	Switzerland	10.7	Q
2	Cyril Holmes	Great Britain	10.8	Q
3	Renos Frangoudis	Greece	10.8	
4	François Mersch	Luxembourg	10.9	
5	Liu Changchun	Republic of China		

==== Heat 12 ====
Rank	Athlete	Nation	Time	Notes
1	Jesse Owens	United States	10.3	Q, =OR
2	Kichizo Sasaki	Japan	11.0	Q
3	José de Almeida	Brazil	11.1	
4	Dieudonné Devrindt	Belgium		
5	Austin Cassar-Torreggiani	Malta		

=== Quarterfinals ===
The fastest three runners in each of the four heats advanced to the semifinal round.

==== Quarterfinal 1 ====
Rank	Athlete	Nation	Time	Notes
1	Lennart Strandberg	Sweden	10.5	Q
2	Tinus Osendarp	Netherlands	10.6	Q
3	Frank Wykoff	United States	10.6	Q
4	Gerd Hornberger	Germany	10.7	
5	Gyula Gyenes	Hungary		
6	Cyril Holmes	Great Britain		

==== Quarterfinal 2 ====
The wind assistance in this quarterfinal was too great for Owens's 10.2 seconds to count to match the world record or better the Olympic record.

Rank	Athlete	Nation	Time	Notes
1	Jesse Owens	United States	10.2	Q
2	Paul Hänni	Switzerland	10.6	Q
3	József Sir	Hungary	10.7	Q
4	Takayoshi Yoshioka	Japan	10.8	
5	Eric Grimbeek	South Africa	10.9	
6	Lennart Lindgren	Sweden	11.0	

==== Quarterfinal 3 ====
Rank	Athlete	Nation	Time	Notes
1	Ralph Metcalfe	United States	10.5	Q
2	Alan Pennington	Great Britain	10.6	Q
3	Wil van Beveren	Netherlands	10.7	Q
4	Marthinus Theunissen	South Africa		
5	Bruce Humber	Canada		
6	Kichizo Sasaki	Japan		

==== Quarterfinal 4 ====
Rank	Athlete	Nation	Time	Notes
1	Erich Borchmeyer	Germany	10.5	Q
2	Arthur Sweeney	Great Britain	10.6	Q
3	Howard McPhee	Canada	10.6	Q
4	Monta Suzuki	Japan	10.8	
5	Chris Berger	Netherlands	11.0	
6	Pat Dannaher	South Africa		

=== Semifinals ===
The fastest three runners in each of the two heats advanced to the final round.

==== Semifinal 1 ====
Rank	Athlete	Nation	Time	Notes
1	Jesse Owens	United States	10.4	Q
2	Frank Wykoff	United States	10.5	Q
3	Lennart Strandberg	Sweden	10.5	Q
4	Paul Hänni	Switzerland	10.7	
5	Wil van Beveren	Netherlands	10.8	
6	Alan Pennington	Great Britain		

==== Semifinal 2 ====
Rank	Athlete	Nation	Time	Notes
1	Ralph Metcalfe	United States	10.5	Q
2	Tinus Osendarp	Netherlands	10.6	Q
3	Erich Borchmeyer	Germany	10.7	Q
4	Howard McPhee	Canada	10.7	
5	Arthur Sweeney	Great Britain	10.7	
6	József Sir	Hungary	10.9	

=== Final ===
Wind: +2.7 m/s

After 30 metres, Owens "had already decided the race in his favour." Metcalfe broke free for silver at 70 metres. Strandberg strained a ligament at the halfway mark.

Rank	Athlete	Nation	Time
1st place, gold medalist(s)	Jesse Owens	United States	10.3
2nd place, silver medalist(s)	Ralph Metcalfe	United States	10.4
3rd place, bronze medalist(s)	Tinus Osendarp	Netherlands	10.5
4	Frank Wykoff	United States	10.6
5	Erich Borchmeyer	Germany	10.7
6	Lennart Strandberg	Sweden	10.9
