= 1938 European Athletics Championships – Men's 100 metres =

Men's 100 metres at the 1938 European Athletics Championships
- Venue: Stade Olympique de Colombes
- Location: Paris
- Dates: 3 September
- Competitors: 20 from 13 nations
- Winning time: 10.5

Medalists
gold medal	Martinus Osendarp	Netherlands
silver medal	Orazio Mariani	Italy
bronze medal	Lennart Strandberg	Sweden

The men's 100 metres at the 1938 European Athletics Championships was held in Paris, France, at Stade Olympique de Colombes on 3 September 1938.

== Participation ==
According to an unofficial count, 20 athletes from 13 countries participated in the event.

- Belgium (2)
- France (2)
- Germany (1)
- Hungary (2)
- Italy (1)
- Liechtenstein (1)
- Luxembourg (1)
- Netherlands (2)
- Norway (1)
- Poland (1)
- Sweden (2)
- Switzerland (2)
- Great Britain (2)

== Results ==
=== Heats ===
3 September

==== Heat 1 ====
Rank	Name	Nationality	Time	Notes
1	Martinus Osendarp	Netherlands	10.5	Q, CR
2	Julien Saelens	Belgium	10.6	Q, NR
3	Ernest Page	Great Britain	10.7	Q
4	Lennart Lindgren	Sweden	10.8	
5	Jean Jourdian	France	10.9	

==== Heat 2 ====
Rank	Name	Nationality	Time	Notes
1	Lennart Strandberg	Sweden	10.6	Q
2	Arthur Sweeney	Great Britain	10.7	Q
3	Erik Sjøvall	Norway	10.7	Q
4	François Mersch	Luxembourg	10.7	
5	Bernard Zaslona	Poland	10.9	
6	Xaver Frick	Liechtenstein	12.5	

==== Heat 3 ====
Rank	Name	Nationality	Time	Notes
1	Wijnand van Beveren	Netherlands	10.6	Q
2	Bernard Marchand	Switzerland	10.7	Q
3	Gyula Gyenes	Hungary	10.7	Q
4	Dieudonné Devrint	Belgium	10.7	

==== Heat 4 ====
Rank	Name	Nationality	Time	Notes
1	Orazio Mariani	Italy	10.5	Q
2	József Sir	Hungary	10.7	Q
3	Manfred Kersch	Germany	10.7	Q
4	Paul Hanni	Switzerland	10.8	
5	Jean Fusil	France	11.2	

=== Semi-finals ===
3 September

==== Semi-final 1 ====
Rank	Name	Nationality	Time	Notes
1	Lennart Strandberg	Sweden	10.5	Q, CR
2	Martinus Osendarp	Netherlands	10.7	Q
3	Bernard Marchand	Switzerland	10.7	Q
4	Manfred Kersch	Germany	10.7	
5	Ernest Page	Great Britain	10.8	
6	Gyula Gyenes	Hungary	10.8	

==== Semi-final 2 ====
Rank	Name	Nationality	Time	Notes
1	Orazio Mariani	Italy	10.4	Q, CR
2	Wijnand van Beveren	Netherlands	10.4	Q, CR
3	Arthur Sweeney	Great Britain	10.5	Q
4	Julien Saelens	Belgium	10.6	NR
5	József Sir	Hungary	11.0	
6	Erik Sjøvall	Norway	11.0	

=== Final ===
3 September

Rank	Name	Nationality	Time	Notes
1st place, gold medalist(s)	Martinus Osendarp	Netherlands	10.5	
2nd place, silver medalist(s)	Orazio Mariani	Italy	10.6	
3rd place, bronze medalist(s)	Lennart Strandberg	Sweden	10.6	
4	Wijnand van Beveren	Netherlands	10.6	
5	Arthur Sweeney	Great Britain	11.0	
6	Bernard Marchand	Switzerland	11.2	
