= 1938 European Athletics Championships – Men's 200 metres =

Men's 200 metres at the 1938 European Athletics Championships
- Venue: Stade Olympique de Colombes
- Location: Paris
- Dates: 4 September (heats, semi-finals & final)
- Competitors: 16 from 11 nations
- Winning time: 21.2

Medalists
gold medal	Martinus Osendarp	Netherlands
silver medal	Jakob Scheuring	Germany
bronze medal	Alan Pennington	Great Britain

The men's 200 metres at the 1938 European Athletics Championships was held in Paris, France, at Stade Olympique de Colombes on 4 September 1938.

== Participation ==
According to an unofficial count, 16 athletes from 11 countries participated in the event.

- Albania (1)
- Belgium (2)
- Estonia (1)
- France (2)
- Germany (1)
- Great Britain (2)
- Hungary (2)
- Liechtenstein (1)
- Netherlands (1)
- Poland (1)
- Switzerland (2)

== Results ==
=== Heats ===
4 September

==== Heat 1 ====
Rank	Name	Nationality	Time	Notes
1	André Dessus	France	24.0	Q
2	Paul Hanni	Switzerland	26.6	Q
3	Martinus Osendarp	Netherlands	27.0	Q

==== Heat 2 ====
Rank	Name	Nationality	Time	Notes
1	Alan Pennington	Great Britain	21.8	Q
2	Gyula Gyenes	Hungary	22.0	Q
3	Bernard Marchand	Switzerland	22.3	Q
4	Oscar Stolz	France	22.4	

==== Heat 3 ====
Rank	Name	Nationality	Time	Notes
1	Julien Saelens	Belgium	21.8	Q, NR
2	Kenneth Jenkins	Great Britain	22.2	Q
3	József Sir	Hungary	22.5	Q
4	Abdyl Këllezi	Albania	24.7	
5	Xaver Frick	Liechtenstein	25.6	

==== Heat 4 ====
Rank	Name	Nationality	Time	Notes
1	Jakob Scheuring	Germany	22.3	Q
2	Dieudonné Devrint	Belgium	22.5	Q
3	Bernard Zasłona	Poland	22.5	Q
	Ruudi Toomsalu	Estonia	DNF	

=== Semi-finals ===
4 September

==== Heat 1 ====
Rank	Name	Nationality	Time	Notes
1	Martinus Osendarp	Netherlands	21.5	Q, CR
2	Kenneth Jenkins	Great Britain	21.9	Q
3	Gyula Gyenes	Hungary	22.0	Q
4	Bernard Zasłona	Poland	22.2	
5	Bernard Marchand	Switzerland	22.6	
6	Dieudonné Devrint	Belgium	22.7	

==== Heat 2 ====
Rank	Name	Nationality	Time	Notes
1	Jakob Scheuring	Germany	21.5	Q, CR
2	Alan Pennington	Great Britain	21.6	Q
3	Julien Saelens	Belgium	21.7	Q, NR
4	Paul Hanni	Switzerland	21.8	
5	André Dessus	France	22.1	
	József Sir	Hungary	DNS	

=== Final ===
4 September

Rank	Name	Nationality	Time	Notes
1st place, gold medalist(s)	Martinus Osendarp	Netherlands	21.2	CR
2nd place, silver medalist(s)	Jakob Scheuring	Germany	21.6	
3rd place, bronze medalist(s)	Alan Pennington	Great Britain	21.6	
4	Julien Saelens	Belgium	21.7	NR
5	Gyula Gyenes	Hungary	22.1	
6	Kenneth Jenkins	Great Britain	22.1	
