= Neckermann =

Neckermann may refer to:

- Josef Neckermann (1912–1992), German entrepreneur and equestrian
- Karl Neckermann (1911–1984), German athlete
- Neckermann Versand AG, German mail order and travel company
