= Boughner =

Boughner is a surname. Notable people with the surname include:

- Barry Boughner (born 1948), Canadian hockey player
- Bob Boughner (born 1971), Canadian hockey player and coach
- Thelma Boughner (1918–2017), Canadian diver
