= Ternström =

Ternström is a surname. Notable people with the surname include:

- Irvin Ternström (1909–1975), Swedish sprinter
- Josef Ternström (1888–1953), Swedish runner
- Olov Ternström (1927–2001), Swedish diplomat
- Solveig Ternström (born 1937), Swedish actress and politician
