= 1934 European Athletics Championships – Men's 4 × 100 metres relay =

Men's 4 × 100 metres relay at the European Athletics Championships

The men's 4 × 100 metres relay at the 1934 European Athletics Championships was held in Turin, Italy, at the Stadio Benito Mussolini on 9 September 1934.

== Medalists ==
Gold	Egon Schein; Erwin Gillmeister; Gerd Hornberger; Erich Borchmeyer; Germany
Silver	László Forgács; József Kovács; József Sir; Gyula Gyenes; Hungary
Bronze	Tinus Osendarp; Tjeerd Boersma; Bob Janssen; Chris Berger; Netherlands

== Results ==
=== Final ===
9 September

Rank	Nation	Competitors	Time	Notes
1st place, gold medalist(s)	Germany	Egon Schein; Erwin Gillmeister; Gerd Hornberger; Erich Borchmeyer	41.0	CR
2nd place, silver medalist(s)	Hungary	László Forgács; József Kovács; József Sir; Gyula Gyenes	41.4	
3rd place, bronze medalist(s)	Netherlands	Tinus Osendarp; Tjeerd Boersma; Bob Janssen; Chris Berger	41.6	
4	Italy	Ulderico Di Blas; Elio Ragni; Mario Larocchi; Edgardo Toetti	42.0	

== Participation ==
According to an unofficial count, 16 athletes from 4 countries participated in the event. The fourth member of the Italian relay team is unknown.

- Germany (4)
- Hungary (4)
- Italy (4)
- Netherlands (4)
