= Wiard =

Wiard is both a surname and a given name. Notable people with the name include:

- Anaëlle Wiard (born 1991), Belgian football, futsal, and beach soccer player
- Charles Wiard (1909–1994), British sprinter
- Tucker Wiard (1941–2022), American television editor
- William Wiard (1927–1987), American film and television director.
- Wiard Ihnen (1897–1979), American art director

== See also ==
- Wiard rifle
