= 1934 European Athletics Championships – Men's 200 metres =

Men's 200 metres at the 1934 European Athletics Championships
- Venue: Stadio Benito Mussolini
- Location: Turin
- Dates: 8 September (semi-finals); 9 September (final)
- Competitors: 12 from 8 nations
- Winning time: 21.5

Medalists
gold medal	Chris Berger	Netherlands
silver medal	József Sir	Hungary
bronze medal	Tinus Osendarp	Netherlands

The men's 200 metres at the 1934 European Athletics Championships was held in Turin, Italy, at the Stadio Benito Mussolini on 8 and 9 September 1934.

== Participation ==
According to an unofficial count, 12 athletes from 8 countries participated in the event.

- Czechoslovakia (1)
- France (1)
- Germany (1)
- Hungary (2)
- Italy (2)
- Latvia (1)
- Netherlands (2)
- Switzerland (2)

== Results ==
=== Semi-finals ===
8 September

==== Heat 1 ====
Rank	Name	Nationality	Time	Notes
1	Chris Berger	Netherlands	21.6	Q, CR
2	József Kovács	Hungary	21.9	Q
3	Tullio Gonnelli	Italy	22.1	Q
4	Albert Jud	Switzerland	22.2	
5	Georges Guillez	France	22.2	
6	Janis Kivitis	Latvia	NT	

==== Heat 2 ====
Rank	Name	Nationality	Time	Notes
1	József Sir	Hungary	21.8	Q
2	Tinus Osendarp	Netherlands	21.9	Q
3	Egon Schein	Germany	21.9	Q
4	Paul Hanni	Switzerland	22.0	
5	Edgardo Toetti	Italy	22.1	
6	Karel Bergmann	Czechoslovakia	NT	

=== Final ===
9 September

Rank	Name	Nationality	Time	Notes
1st place, gold medalist(s)	Chris Berger	Netherlands	21.5	CR
2nd place, silver medalist(s)	József Sir	Hungary	21.5	CR
3rd place, bronze medalist(s)	Tinus Osendarp	Netherlands	21.6	
4	József Kovács	Hungary	21.7	
5	Egon Schein	Germany	21.9	
6	Tullio Gonnelli	Italy	22.0	
