= Kichizo Sasaki =

Japanese sprinter (1912–1983)

Personal information
- Nationality: Japanese
- Born: 10 March 1912
- Died: 23 January 1983 (aged 70)

Sport
- Sport: Sprinting
- Event: 100 metres

Kichizo Sasaki (Japanese: 佐々木 吉蔵, Hepburn: Sasaki Kichizō; 10 March 1912 – 23 January 1983) was a Japanese sprinter. He was selected for the 1932 Los Angeles Olympics but had to drop out because of an injury. He competed in the men's 100 metres at the 1936 Summer Olympics. He later worked at the Japanese Ministry of Education and was the starter for the 100 meter finals at the 1964 Tokyo Olympics.
