= 1938 AAA Championships =

Outdoor track and field competition

- Dates: 15–16 July 1938
- Host city: London, England
- Venue: White City Stadium
- Level: Senior
- Type: Outdoor
- Events: 26

The 1938 AAA Championships was the 1938 edition of the annual outdoor track and field competition organised by the Amateur Athletic Association (AAA). It was held from 15 to 16 July 1938 at White City Stadium in London, England.

The Championships consisted of 26 events and covered two days of competition. The decathlon was held at Loughborough on 5–6 August.

== Results ==
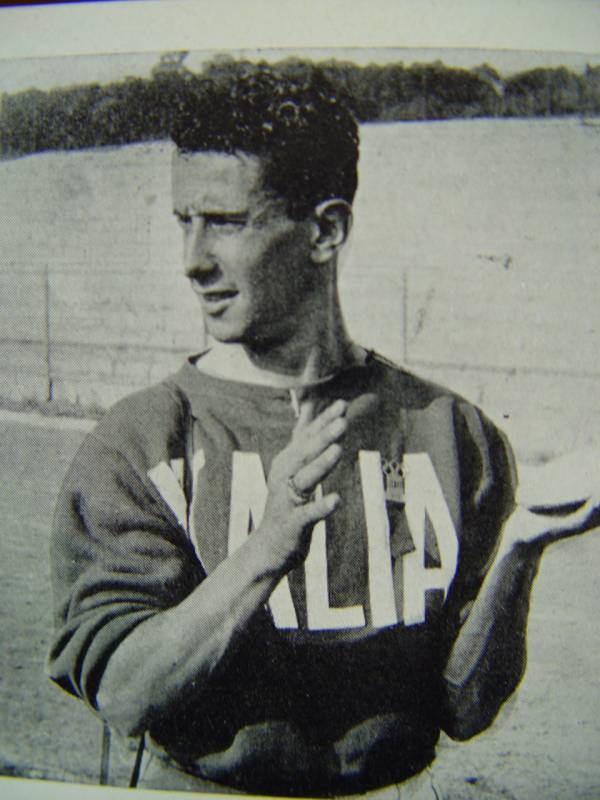
Maffei was one of 5 Italians to win a title

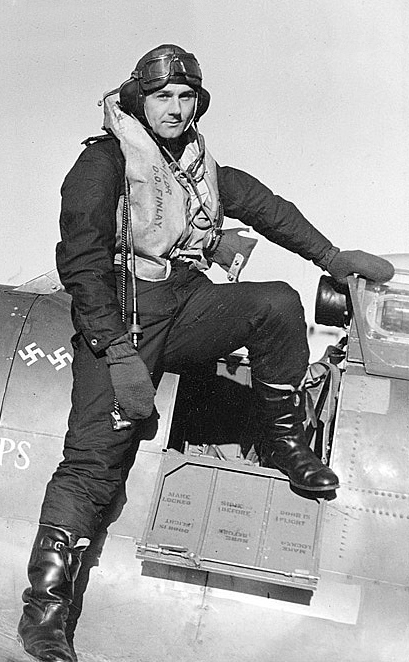
Don Finlay continued to dominate the 120 yards hurdles

Event	Gold		Silver		Bronze	
100 yards	(Netherlands) Tinus Osendarp	9.8	(Italy) Orazio Mariani	1 yd - 4 ft	Maurice Scarr	1 ft - ½ yd
220 yards	(Netherlands) Wil van Beveren	22.1	(Scotland) Robin Murdoch	1½ yd	Kenneth Jenkins	½-1½ yd
440 yards	Godfrey Brown	49.2	Alan Pennington	49.3	Bill Roberts	49.4
880 yards	Arthur Collyer	1:53.7	Alfred Baldwin	1:54.9	Brian MacCabe	1:55.2
1 mile	Sydney Wooderson	4:13.4	Denis Pell	4:14.2	(Wales) Jim Alford	4:15.4
3 miles	Jack Emery	14:21.0	Peter Ward	14:21.1	Patrick Hennessy	14:22.4
6 miles	(Italy) Giuseppe Beviacqua	30:06.6	(Republic of Ireland) Frank Cummins	30:23.4	Reginald Draper	30:56.2
10 miles	Reginald Draper	52:40.6	(Wales) Samuel Palmer	52:47.0	Arthur Penny	52:52.0
marathon	John Beman	2:36:39.6	Francis O'Sullivan	2:40:03.0	George Latham	2:40:21.0
steeplechase	John Potts	10:39.2	Bernard Fishwick	10:44.2	A. Stokes	10:46.4
120y hurdles	Don Finlay	14.4	John Thornton	3-5 yd	(Netherlands) Jan Brasser	1-2 yd
440y hurdles	(Belgium) Juul Bosmans	54.1	(France) Prudent Joye	54.2	(Republic of Ireland) Robert Wallace	55.5
2 miles walk	Bert Cooper	14:02.2	Eddie Staker	14:07.6	Harry Churcher	14:11.4
7 miles walk	(Sweden) John Mikaelsson	51:48.2	(Sweden) Erik Hedberg	53:23.0	Joe Coleman	53:36.8
high jump	(Republic of Ireland) Richard O'Rafferty	1.854	(Scotland) Robert Kennedy	1.854	Hubert Stubbs	1.854
pole vault	(Italy) Mario Romeo	3.96	Dick Webster	3.90	(Scotland) Alexander Gibson	3.50
long jump	(Italy) Arturo Maffei	7.52	(Luxembourg) François Mersch	7.07	William Breach	7.03
triple jump	(Northern Ireland) Edward Boyce	14.06	Bert Shillington	13.85	(Scotland) Sam Beattie	13.61
shot put	(Italy) Angiolo Profeti	14.06	Robert Howland	13.90	(Scotland) Angus Milligan	13.30
discus throw	(Italy) Adolfo Consolini	43.60	(Scotland) David Young	42.06	(Netherlands) Jan Brasser	40.99
hammer throw	(Republic of Ireland) Bert Healion	52.46	Tom McAnallen	45.70	(Scotland) Duncan Clark	45.40
javelin throw	(South Africa) Ralph Blakeway	60.08	Stanley Wilson	57.90	(Norway) Alp Lommerud	56.18
decathlon	Thomas Lockton	5513 NR	John Cotter	5396	Patrick Skipworth	4960
Tug of war (catchweight)	Royal Ulster Constabulary		Royal Army Service Corps (Feltham)			
440 yards relay	GS Baracca Milano Pro Patria	45.2sec	GS Oberdan Pro Patria Milano		De Trekvogals	
Tug of war (100st)	Royal Army Service Corps (Feltham)		Cranleigh & District British Legion			

== See also ==
- 1938 WAAA Championships
