= Oswaldo Domingues =

Brazilian sprinter

Personal information
- Nationality: Brazilian
- Born: 14 February 1917
- Died: 4 January 2009 (aged 91)

Sport
- Sport: Sprinting
- Event: 100 metres

Oswaldo Domingues (14 February 1917 – 4 January 2009) was a Brazilian sprinter. He competed in the men's 100 metres at the 1936 Summer Olympics.
