= Albert Steinmetz =

German sprinter

Personal information
- Nationality: German
- Born: 28 December 1909
- Died: 8 August 1984 (aged 74)

Sport
- Sport: Sprinting
- Event: 200 metres

Albert Steinmetz (28 December 1909 – 8 August 1984) was a German sprinter. He competed in the men's 200 metres at the 1936 Summer Olympics.
