= Tullio Gonnelli =

Italian sprinter (1912–2005)

Personal information
- National team: Italy
- Born: 21 November 1912 Pieve di Cento, Italy
- Died: 12 January 2005 (aged 92) Hampden, United States
- Height: 1.84 m (6 ft 0 in)
- Weight: 78 kg (172 lb)

Sport
- Sport: Athletics
- Event: Sprint
- Club: Virtus Bologna

Achievements and titles
- Personal best: 100 m: 10.5 (1938)
Medal record
Silver medal – second place	1936 Berlin	4x100 metre relay

Tullio Gonnelli (21 November 1912 – 12 January 2005) was an Italian athlete who competed mainly in the 100 metres. He was born in Pieve di Cento, Bologna, Italy.

== Biography ==
He competed for Italy in the 1936 Summer Olympics held in Berlin, Germany in the 4 x 100 metre relay where he won the silver medal with his team mates Orazio Mariani, Gianni Caldana and Elio Ragni. He participated in 1934 European Athletics Championships – Men's 200 metres and 1938 European Athletics Championships – Men's 4 × 100 metres relay. Gonnelli was looking forward to competing in the 1940 Summer Olympics in Tokyo but the advent of World War II meant the cancellation of the Games and he served 3 years in the army instead. He died in Longmeadow, Massachusetts, United States.

== Olympic results ==
Year	Competition	Venue	Position	Event	Performance	Notes
1936	Olympic Games	(Germany) Berlin	2nd	4 × 100 m relay	41.1	

== National titles ==
Tullio Gonnelli has won 5 times the individual national championship.

- 1 win in the 100 metres (1935)
- 4 wins in the 200 metres (1935, 1938, 1939, 1940)

== See also ==
- Italy national relay team
