= Eric Whiteside =

Indian sprinter

Personal information
- Nationality: Indian
- Born: Eric Stanley Kenneth Whiteside; 25 October 1904 Firozpur, Punjab Province, British India
- Died: 12 May 1997 (aged 92) Australia

Sport
- Sport: Sprinting
- Event: 100 metres

Eric Stanley Kenneth Whiteside (25 October 1904 – 12 May 1997) was an Indian sprinter. He competed in the men's 100 metres and 200 metres at the 1936 Summer Olympics.

Before the 1936 Games, the short and sturdy Whiteside had a personal best of 21.8 seconds for 220 yards and had run 100 yards under 9.8 seconds several times. He had beaten other top Indian athletes of the time like Bunoo Sutton and Ronald Vernieux. He worked in Railways in Lahore at the time.

Whiteside was a three time All-Indian Lightweight Boxing Champion, before he shifted to athletics. He is the father of the field hockey player Ray Whiteside who represented Australia at the 1956 Summer Olympics.
