= Juan Lavenás =

Argentine sprinter

Personal information
- Nationality: Argentine
- Born: 5 September 1914
- Died: 19 April 1999 (aged 84)

Sport
- Sport: Sprinting
- Event: 4 × 100 metres relay

Juan Lavenás (5 September 1914 – 19 April 1999) was an Argentine sprinter. He competed in the men's 4 × 100 metres relay at the 1936 Summer Olympics.
