= Östen Sandström =

Swedish sprinter

Personal information
- Nationality: Swedish
- Born: 3 October 1910
- Died: 10 March 1994 (aged 83)

Sport
- Sport: Sprinting
- Event: 4 × 100 metres relay

Östen Sandström (3 October 1910 – 10 March 1994) was a Swedish sprinter. He competed in the men's 4 × 100 metres relay at the 1936 Summer Olympics.
