= Robert Struckl =

Austrian sprinter

Personal information
- Nationality: Austrian
- Born: 9 June 1918
- Died: 9 October 2013 (aged 95)

Sport
- Sport: Sprinting
- Event: 100 metres

Robert Struckl (9 June 1918 – 9 October 2013) was an Austrian sprinter. He competed in the men's 100 metres at the 1936 Summer Olympics.
