= Sveinn Ingvarsson =

Icelandic sprinter (1914–2009)

Personal information
- Nationality: Icelandic
- Born: 2 July 1914
- Died: 22 January 2009 (aged 94)

Sport
- Sport: Sprinting
- Event: 100 metres

Sveinn Ingvarsson (2 July 1914 – 22 January 2009) was an Icelandic sprinter. He competed in the men's 100 metres at the 1936 Summer Olympics.
