= Bob Packard (sprinter) =

American sprinter

Personal information
- Full name: Robert Raymond Packard
- Born: July 30, 1916 Rockford, Illinois, U.S.
- Died: December 21, 1980 (aged 64) Wichita Falls, Texas, U.S.

Sport
- Sport: Sprinting
- Event: 200 metres

Robert Raymond Packard (July 30, 1916 – December 21, 1980) was an American sprinter. He competed in the men's 200 metres at the 1936 Summer Olympics.

Packard competed for the Georgia Bulldogs track and field team in the NCAA.
