= Orazio Mariani =

Italian sprinter (1915–1981)

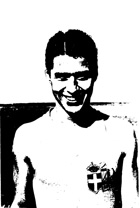

Personal information
- Nationality: Italian
- Born: 21 January 1915 Milan, Italy
- Died: 16 October 1981 (aged 66) Milan, Italy
- Height: 1.79 m (5 ft 10 1/2 in)
- Weight: 76 kg (168 lb)

Sport
- Country: Italy
- Sport: Athletics
- Event: Sprint
- Club: G.S. Baracca

Achievements and titles
- Personal best: 100 m: 10.4 (1938)
Medal record
Men's athletics
Representing Italy
Olympic Games
Silver medal – second place	1936 Berlin	4x100 metre relay
European Championships
Silver medal – second place	1938 Paris	100 metres

Orazio Mariani (21 January 1915 – 16 October 1981) was an Italian athlete who competed mainly in the 100 metre sprint and competed at the 1936 Summer Olympics.

== Biography ==
Mariani competed for Italy in the 1936 Olympic Games, held in Berlin, Germany, in the 4 x 100 metre relay, where he won the silver medal with his teammates Gianni Caldana, Elio Ragni and Tullio Gonnelli.

Mariani finished second behind Tinus Osendarp in the 100 yards event at the British 1938 AAA Championships. Soon after, in September at the 1938 European Athletics Championships, Mariani won the silver medal in the 200 metres.

== Olympic results ==
Year	Competition	Venue	Position	Event	Performance	Notes
1936	Olympic Games	(Germany) Berlin	2nd	4 × 100 m relay	41.1	

== Competition record ==
Year	Competition	Venue	Position	Event	Notes
Representing Italy
1934	European Championships	Turin, Italy	4th (sf 1)	100 m	10.9

== National titles ==
Orazio Mariani has won 8 times the individual national championship.

- 7 wins in the 100 metres (1933, 1936, 1937, 1938, 1939, 1942, 1943)
- 1 win in the 200 metres (1943)
