= Erwin Gillmeister =

German sprinter

Medal record

Men's athletics

Representing Germany

Olympic Games
Bronze medal – third place	1936 Berlin	4×100 m

Representing Germany

European Championships
Gold medal – first place	1934 Turin	4×100 m

Erwin Gillmeister (11 July 1907 – 26 November 1993) was a German athlete who competed mainly in the 100 metres.

Gillmeister was born in Thorn (Toruń) in West Prussia. He competed for Germany in the 1936 Summer Olympics held in Berlin, Germany in the 4 × 100 metre relay where he won the bronze medal with his teammates Wilhelm Leichum, Erich Borchmeyer and Gerd Hornberger. He died in Munich, Bavaria
