= Ray Whiteside =

Australian hockey player

Personal information
- Full name: Raymond Eric Stanley Whiteside
- Nationality: Australian
- Born: 13 April 1932 (age 94) Lahore, British India

Sport
- Sport: Field hockey

Raymond Eric Stanley Whiteside (born 13 April 1932) is an Indian-born Australian field hockey player. Whiteside competed in the men's tournament at the 1956 Summer Olympics and is the son of the 1936 Olympian British Indian sprinter Eric Whiteside.
