= Antonio Salcedo =

Filipino sprinter (1912–1993)

Personal information
- Nationality: Filipino
- Born: Antonio Manuel Salcedo; October 15, 1912 Legazpi, Albay, Philippine Islands
- Died: June 11, 1993 (aged 80) San Francisco, California, U.S.

Sport
- Sport: Sprinting
- Events: 100 metres 200 metres

Antonio Manuel Salcedo (October 15, 1912 – June 11, 1993) was a Filipino sprinter. He competed in the men's 100 metres and the men's 200 metres at the 1936 Summer Olympics.
