= Ralph Metcalfe =

American athlete and politician (1910–1978)

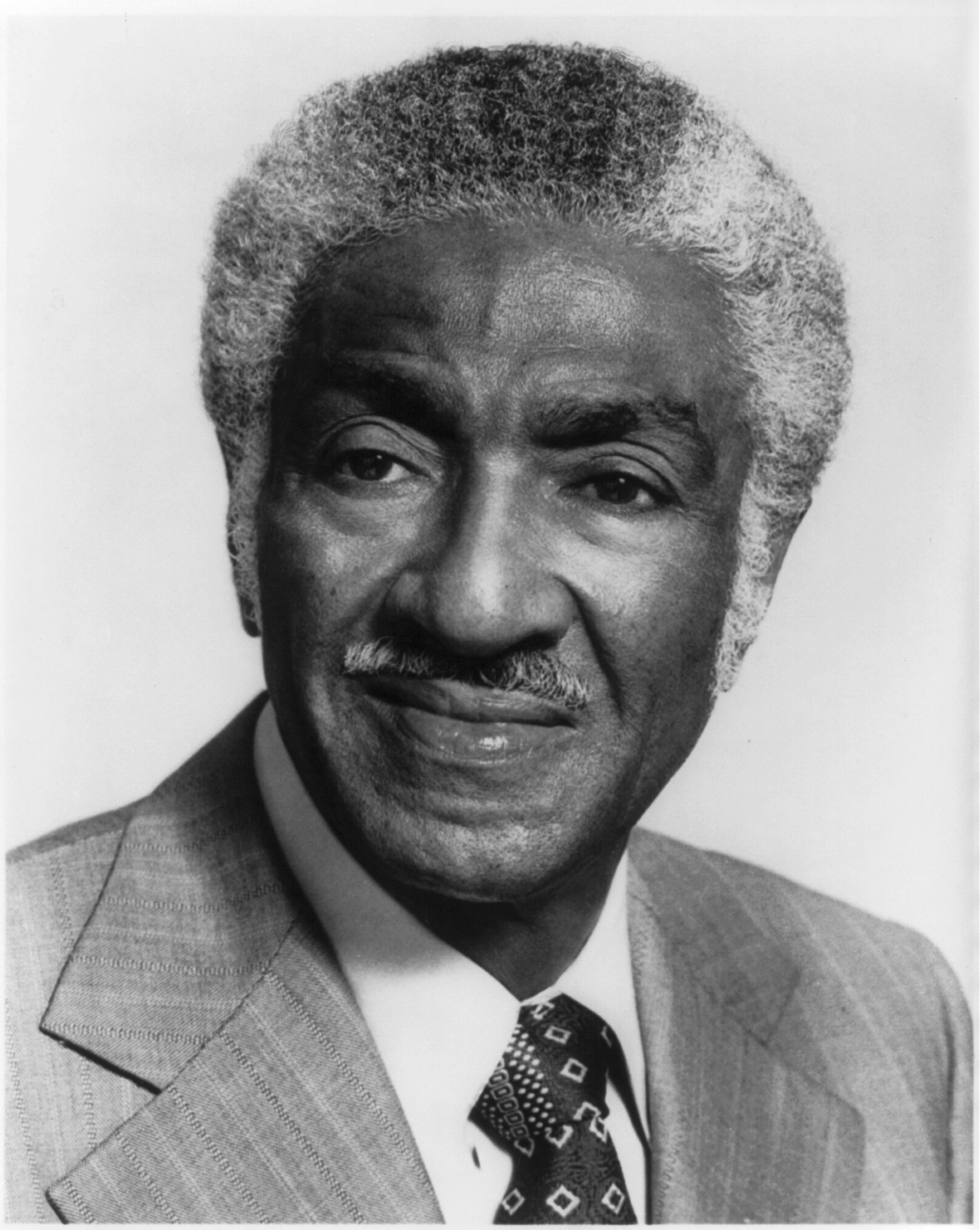
- Metcalfe in 1977

Member of the U.S. House of Representatives from Illinois's 1st district
- In office January 3, 1971 – October 10, 1978
- Preceded by: William Dawson
- Succeeded by: Bennett Stewart

Member of the Chicago City Council from the 3rd Ward
- In office April 1955 – December 1970
- Preceded by: Archibald Carey Jr.
- Succeeded by: Tyrone Kenner

Personal details
- Born: Ralph Harold Metcalfe; May 29, 1910 Atlanta, Georgia, U.S.
- Died: October 10, 1978 (aged 68) Chicago, Illinois, U.S.
- Resting place: Holy Sepulchre Cemetery
- Party: Democratic
- Spouses: Gertrude Pemberton (m. 1937; div. 1943) Madalynne Young (m. 1947)
- Children: 1 son
- Education: Marquette University (BPhil); University of Southern California (MA)

Military service
- Allegiance: United States
- Branch/service: United States Army
- Years of service: 1942–1945
- Rank: First Lieutenant
- Battles/wars: World War II

Medal record

Men's Athletics

Representing the United States

Olympic Games
Gold medal – first place	1936 Berlin	4 × 100 m relay
Silver medal – second place	1932 Los Angeles	100 meters
Silver medal – second place	1936 Berlin	100 meters
Bronze medal – third place	1932 Los Angeles	200 meters

Ralph Harold Metcalfe Sr. (May 29, 1910 – October 10, 1978) was an American track and field sprinter and politician. He jointly held the world record in the 100-meter dash and placed second in that event in two Olympics, first to Eddie Tolan in 1932 at Los Angeles and then to Jesse Owens at the 1936 Olympics in Berlin, Germany. Metcalfe won four Olympic medals and was regarded as the world's fastest human in 1934 and 1935.

He later went into politics in the city of Chicago and served in the United States Congress for four terms in the 1970s as a Democrat from Illinois.

== Track and field career ==
Born in Atlanta, Georgia, Metcalfe grew up in Chicago and graduated high school from Tilden Tech in 1930.

He accepted a track scholarship to Marquette University in Milwaukee, Wisconsin, and equaled the record of 10.3 seconds in the 100 m on a number of occasions, as well as equaling the 200 m record of 20.6 seconds. He became the first man to win the NCAA 200 m title three times consecutively.

At the 1932 Summer Olympics in Los Angeles, he virtually dead-heated with his rival Eddie Tolan, with the gold medal awarded to Tolan only after extended study of the photograph; both recorded a time of 10.38 seconds in the 100 meters. Metcalfe also earned a bronze medal at these games, in the 200 meters.

He competed again at the 1936 Summer Olympics in Berlin, and again took silver in the 100 meters, this time behind four-time gold medalist Owens. They won gold in the 4 × 100 meter relay with Foy Draper and Frank Wykoff; the U.S. won by 1.1 seconds over runner-up Italy, and Germany took bronze. Fierce rivals on the track, Metcalfe and Owens became lifelong friends.

=== Olympic controversies ===
==== 1932 ====
Metcalfe was convinced to the end of his life that the 100 m should have been awarded as a tie between him and Eddie Tolan: "I have never been convinced I was defeated. It should have been a tie." Film evidence and that of observers of the race seem to support Metcalfe's verdict. The AAU later changed their rules to have the winner being the first athlete to cross the line not merely breast the tape. It was the latter that Tolan was judged to have done first. The AAU went further and awarded the race as a tie but the International Olympic Committee has never agreed to this change. They maintain the result stands because the judges decided in line with the rules at the time that Eddie Tolan's entire torso had passed the finish line on the ground before Metcalfe's. In addition, even though credited with same time as Tolan, 10.3 s, a time that equaled the then world record, Metcalfe's time was never ratified as a world record.

In the 200 m, Metcalfe was embroiled in further controversy. Observers at the time claimed the marking for his starting holes were 3–4 feet behind where they should have been. Others claimed this discrepancy was the result of an optical illusion because George Simpson in the lane outside cut his holes on the outside of his lane whilst Metcalfe used the inside of his. In any case, Metcalfe was offered a re-run but refused because he feared the United States would not be able to repeat its 1–2–3.

==== 1936 ====
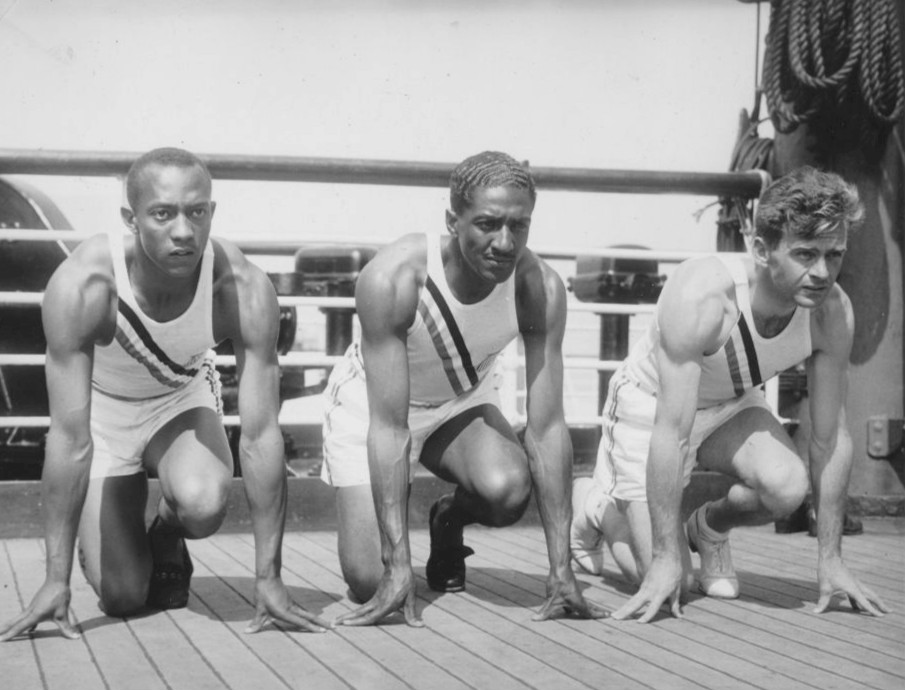
Metcalfe (center) with Jesse Owens and Frank Wykoff on the deck of the S.S. Manhattan as the team sailed for Germany in 1936

In the sprint relay, Metcalfe became involved in a controversy not of his own making. Originally the United States chose for the relay the athletes who had come 4th to 7th in the trials. Two of these athletes, Sam Stoller and Marty Glickman, were replaced with Metcalfe and Jesse Owens allegedly because the former were Jewish. Metcalfe and Owens were undoubtedly the superior sprinters but they had not done the relay baton practice and the switch went against established practice.

Whilst all world attention was on Jesse Owens winning the gold in the 100 m it is often ignored that Metcalfe won the silver in an equally outstanding performance.

=== United States Championships ===
Metcalfe was United States Champion at 100 m between 1932 and 1934 (and was 2nd in 1935–36) and at 200 m between 1932 and 1936.

In all he won 16 national titles at the AAU Championships, NCAA Championships and Final Olympic Trials.

=== World records ===
Metcalfe 16 times broke or equaled world record times at various distances. However, only 5 of these were ever officially ratified by the athletics governing body, the IAAF. The ratified times were:

- equaled the world record for 100 m of 10.3 s on:
  - August 12, 1933 in Budapest, Hungary.
  - September 15, 1934 in Nishinomiya, Japan.
  - September 23, 1934 in Darien, Japan.
- equaled the world record for 200 m (straight course) of 20.6 s on August 12, 1933 in Budapest, Hungary.
- broke the world record for the 4 × 100 m relay with 39.8 s on August 9, 1936 (United States 1936 Olympics team of Jesse Owens-Metcalfe-Foy Draper-Frank Wykoff).

== Military and political career ==
After earning his bachelor's degree at Marquette in 1936, Metcalfe completed a master's degree at the University of Southern California in Los Angeles in 1939. Metcalfe taught political science and coached track at Xavier University in New Orleans, recruiting athletes to the university like Jimmie McDaniel and Herb Douglas. He served in the transportation corps of U.S. Army in World War II, rising to the rank of first lieutenant and awarded the Legion of Merit medal. After the war, he moved back to Chicago and later headed the state's athletic commission.

In 1955, Metcalfe won the first of four elections as an alderman representing the South Side of Chicago. He ran for an open seat in Congress in 1970 as a Democrat and was easily elected from Illinois' first district. The seat had been filled for 28 years by William L. Dawson, who was retiring at age 84 due to poor health and then died less than a week after the 1970 election. Metcalfe was a co-founder of the Congressional Black Caucus (CBC) in 1971 and later was noted for breaking ranks with Chicago mayor Richard Daley after incidents of police brutality.

== Death ==
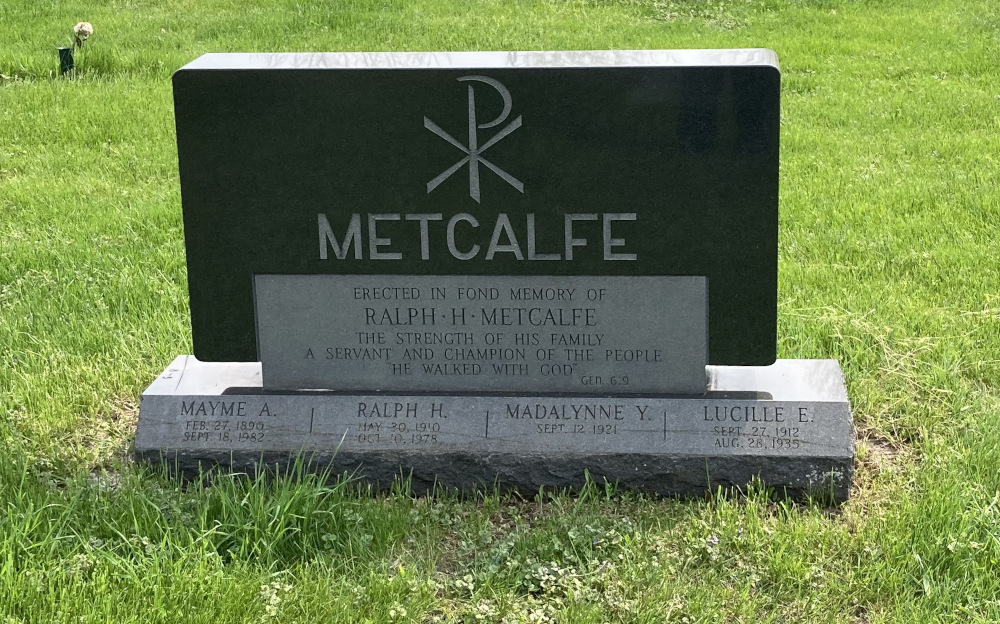
Metcalfe's grave at Holy Sepulchre Cemetery

While running for re-election in 1978, Metcalfe died from a heart attack at his South Side apartment on October 10, at the age of 68. He had previously had a heart attack in 1967.

== Personal life ==
Metcalfe married Gertrude Eva Pemberton on June 9, 1937, at St. Peter the Apostle Catholic Church in Dallas, Texas. They divorced in Los Angeles, California in 1943. Metcalfe married Madalynne Fay Young in 1947, and they had one son, Ralph Metcalfe Jr., a blues music historian.

Metcalfe was a member of Alpha Phi Alpha fraternity, Alpha Sigma Nu honor society, the Knights of Peter Claver, and Corpus Christi Catholic Church in Chicago's Bronzeville neighborhood. He had converted to Catholicism in 1932, while an undergraduate at Marquette.

== Legacy ==
A federal office building in Chicago (at 77 W. Jackson Blvd.) was named for Metcalfe upon its completion in 1991.

Metcalfe was inducted into the National Track and Field Hall of Fame in 1975 and named a member of the President's Commission on Olympic Sports.

In 2016, the 1936 Olympic journey of the eighteen Black American athletes, including interviews with Metcalfe's son, was documented in the film Olympic Pride, American Prejudice.

== Electoral history ==
Illinois's 1st congressional district Democratic primary, 1970
Party	Candidate	Votes	%
Democratic	Ralph H. Metcalfe	42,575	71.05
Democratic	A. A. Rayner, Jr.	17,346	28.95
Total votes		59,921	100.0

Illinois's 1st congressional district general election, 1970
Party	Candidate	Votes	%
Democratic	Ralph H. Metcalfe	93,272	90.96
Republican	Janet Roberts Jennings	9,267	9.04
Total votes		102,539	100.0

Illinois's 1st congressional district Democratic primary, 1972
Party	Candidate	Votes	%
Democratic	Ralph H. Metcalfe (incumbent)	61,927	99.99
Write-in		9	0.01
Total votes		61,936	100.0

Illinois's 1st congressional district general election, 1972
Party	Candidate	Votes	%
Democratic	Ralph H. Metcalfe (incumbent)	136,755	91.39
Republican	Louis H. Coggs	12,877	8.61
Write-in		2	0.00
Total votes		149,634	100.0

Illinois's 1st congressional district Democratic primary, 1974
Party	Candidate	Votes	%
Democratic	Ralph H. Metcalfe (incumbent)	45,789	100.0
Total votes		45,789	100.0

Illinois's 1st congressional district general election, 1974
Party	Candidate	Votes	%
Democratic	Ralph H. Metcalfe (incumbent)	75,206	93.74
Republican	Oscar H. Haynes	4,399	5.48
Socialist Workers	Willie Mae Reid	620	0.77
Total votes		80,225	100.0

Illinois's 1st congressional district Democratic primary, 1976
Party	Candidate	Votes	%
Democratic	Ralph H. Metcalfe (incumbent)	56,101	71.81
Democratic	Erwin A. France	22,028	28.19
Total votes		78,129	100.0

Illinois's 1st congressional district general election, 1976
Party	Candidate	Votes	%
Democratic	Ralph H. Metcalfe (incumbent)	126,632	92.30
Republican	A. A. Rayner, Jr.	10,147	7.40
Workers' Party	Debra Simonsen	211	0.15
Socialist Workers	Andrew C. Pulley	198	0.14
Write-in		5	0.00
Total votes		137,193	100.0

Illinois's 1st congressional district Democratic primary, 1978
Party	Candidate	Votes	%
Democratic	Ralph H. Metcalfe (incumbent)	26,814	100.0
Total votes		26,814	100.0

== See also ==
- List of African-American United States representatives
- List of members of the United States Congress who died in office (1950–1999)

U.S. House of Representatives
Preceded by William Dawson	Member of the U.S. House of Representatives from Illinois's 1st congressional district 1971–1978	Succeeded by Bennett M. Stewart
Party political offices
Preceded by Mike Mansfield	Response to the State of the Union address 1972; Served alongside: Carl Albert, Lloyd Bentsen, Hale Boggs, John Brademas, Frank Church, Thomas Eagleton, Martha Griffiths, John Melcher, William Proxmire, Leonor Sullivan	Vacant Title next held by Mike Mansfield; 1974
