= Aristidis Sakellariou =

Greek sprinter

Personal information
- Nationality: Greek
- Born: 5 February 1911
- Died: 1992 (aged 80–81)

Sport
- Sport: Sprinting
- Event: 100 metres

Aristidis Sakellariou (5 February 1911 – 1992) was a Greek sprinter. He competed in the men's 100 metres at the 1936 Summer Olympics.
