= Nemesio de Guzman =

Filipino sprinter

Personal information
- Nationality: Filipino
- Born: December 8, 1916 Alaminos, Pangasinan, Philippine Islands
- Died: 1944 (aged 27–28) Philippine Commonwealth

Sport
- Sport: Sprinting
- Event: 100 metres

Nemesio de Guzman (December 8, 1916 – 1944) was a Filipino sprinter. He competed in the men's 100 metres at the 1936 Summer Olympics.

A native of Alaminos, Pangasinan, de Guzman served as a lieutenant with the Philippine Scouts. He was killed in action during World War II.
