= Fritz Seeger =

Swiss sprinter

Personal information
- Nationality: Swiss
- Born: 18 April 1912
- Died: 16 October 1973 (aged 61)

Sport
- Sport: Sprinting
- Event: 100 metres

Fritz Seeger (18 April 1912 – 16 October 1973) was a Swiss sprinter. He competed in the men's 100 metres at the 1936 Summer Olympics.
