= George Fahoum =

Egyptian sprinter

Personal information
- Nationality: Egyptian
- Born: 4 July 1909 Cairo, Egypt
- Died: 14 November 1999 (aged 90) Giza, Egypt

Sport
- Sport: Sprinting
- Event: 100 metres

George Fahoum (4 July 1909 – 14 November 1999) was an Egyptian sprinter. He competed in the men's 100 metres at the 1936 Summer Olympics.
