= Don Collinge =

Canadian fencer

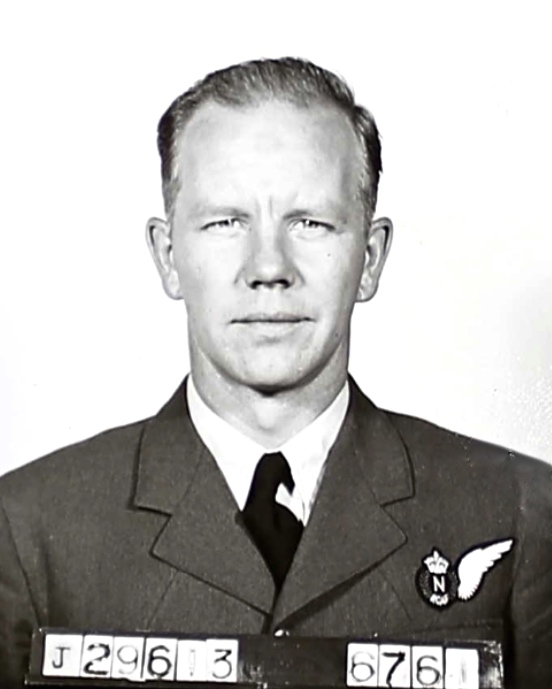

Personal information
- Born: Frank Donald Collinge; 14 October 1909 Toronto, Ontario, Canada
- Died: 7 June 1944 (aged 34) near Saltby, England

Sport
- Sport: Fencing

Frank Donald Collinge (14 October 1909 – 7 June 1944) was a Canadian fencer. He competed in five events at the 1936 Summer Olympics. He was killed in action during the Second World War.

== Personal life ==
Collinge served as a flying officer in the Royal Canadian Air Force during the Second World War. Serving as a navigator, he was part of the crew of Stirling III LK594. The aircraft lost control and crashed near RAF Saltby during a night training mission on 7 June 1944, killing all on board. Collinge is buried at Harrogate (Stonefall) Commonwealth War Graves Commission Cemetery.
