= Charles Otis (fencer) =

Canadian fencer

Personal information
- Born: 9 May 1906 Montreal, Quebec, Canada
- Died: 19 December 1970 (aged 64)

Sport
- Sport: Fencing

Charles Otis (9 May 1906 – 19 December 1970) was a Canadian fencer. He competed in five events at the 1936 Summer Olympics.
