= Tjeerd Boersma =

Dutch sprinter

Personal information
- Nationality: Dutch
- Born: 22 February 1915
- Died: 3 June 1985 (aged 70)

Sport
- Sport: Sprinting
- Event: 4 × 100 metres relay
Medal record
Men's athletics
Representing the Netherlands
European Championships
Bronze medal – third place	1934 Turin	4×100 m

Tjeerd Boersma (22 February 1915 – 3 June 1985) was a Dutch sprinter. He competed in the men's 4 × 100 metres relay at the 1936 Summer Olympics in Berlin. His personal best time of 10.7 seconds in 100 meters was recorded in 1937.
