= Gerd Hornberger =

German sprinter (1910–1988)

Medal record

Men's athletics

Representing Germany

Olympic Games
Bronze medal – third place	1936 Berlin	4×100 m

European Championships
Gold medal – first place	1938 Paris	4×100 m

Representing Germany

European Championships
Gold medal – first place	1934 Turin	4×100 m

Gerd Hornberger (17 February 1910 – 13 September 1988) was a German athlete who competed mainly in the 100 metres.

He competed for Germany in the 1936 Summer Olympics held in Berlin, Germany in the 4 × 100 metre relay, winning the bronze medal with his teammates Wilhelm Leichum, Erich Borchmeyer and Erwin Gillmeister.

Hornberger was born and died in Waldfischbach-Burgalben.

== Competition record ==
Year	Competition	Venue	Position	Event	Notes
Representing Germany
1934	European Championships	Turin, Italy	6th	100 m	10.9
