= George Turner (cyclist) =

Canadian cyclist

Personal information
- Born: 3 June 1915
- Died: 21 August 1965 (aged 50)

Cycling career
- Sport: Cycling

George Turner (3 June 1915 – 21 August 1965) was a Canadian cyclist. He competed in the three events at the 1936 Summer Olympics.
