= Carlos Hofmeister =

Argentine sprinter

Personal information
- Full name: Carlos Nazareno Hofmeister
- Born: 15 September 1909 Buenos Aires, Argentina
- Died: 10 June 1974 (aged 64)

Sport
- Sport: Sprinting
- Event: 200 metres

Carlos Nazareno Hofmeister (15 September 1909 – 10 June 1974) was an Argentine sprinter. He competed in the men's 200 metres at the 1936 Summer Olympics.
