= Jack Liddle =

Canadian middle-distance runner

Personal information
- Nationality: Canadian
- Born: 20 October 1910
- Died: 1997 (aged 86–87)

Sport
- Sport: Middle-distance running
- Event: 800 metres

Jack Liddle (20 October 1910 – 1997) was a Canadian middle-distance runner. He competed in the men's 800 metres at the 1936 Summer Olympics.
