= Pierre Dondelinger =

French sprinter

Personal information
- Nationality: French
- Born: 29 January 1913
- Died: 12 April 2000 (aged 87)

Sport
- Sport: Sprinting
- Event: 200 metres

Pierre Dondelinger (29 January 1913 – 12 April 2000) was a French sprinter. He competed in the men's 200 metres at the 1936 Summer Olympics.

== Competition record ==
Year	Competition	Venue	Position	Event	Notes
Representing France
1934	European Championships	Turin, Italy	4th (ht 2)	100 m	11.0
