= Masao Yazawa =

Japanese sprinter

Personal information
- Nationality: Japanese
- Born: 15 May 1915
- Died: 11 December 2004 (aged 89)

Sport
- Sport: Sprinting
- Event: 200 metres

Masao Yazawa (15 May 1915 – 11 December 2004) was a Japanese sprinter. He competed in the men's 200 metres and the men's 4 x 100 meters relay events at the 1936 Summer Olympics.
