= Gianni Caldana =

Italian athlete

Personal information
- Full name: Giacinto Caldana
- Nationality: Italian
- Born: 19 November 1913 Vicenza, Italy
- Died: 6 September 1995 (aged 82)
- Height: 1.80 m (5 ft 11 in)
- Weight: 70 kg (154 lb)

Sport
- Country: Italy
- Sport: Athletics
- Events: Sprint; Long jump
- Club: Giglio Rosso Firenze

Achievements and titles
- Personal bests: 110 m hs: 14.7 (1940); Long jump: 7.50 m (1936)
Medal record
Silver medal – second place	1936 Berlin	4x100 metre relay

Gianni Caldana (19 November 1912 – 6 September 1995) was an Italian athlete who competed mainly in the 110 metres hurdles.

== Biography ==
Caldana competed for an Italy at the 1936 Summer Olympics held in Berlin, Germany in the 4 x 100 metre relay where he won the silver medal with his team mates Orazio Mariani, Elio Ragni and Tullio Gonnelli.

== Olympic results ==
Year	Competition	Venue	Position	Event	Performance	Notes
1936	Olympic Games	(Germany) Berlin	2nd	4 × 100 m relay	41.1	
1936	Olympic Games	(Germany) Berlin	12th	Long jump	7.26 m	Wind assisted
1936	Olympic Games	(Germany) Berlin	Heat	110 metres hurdles	15.1	

== National titles ==
Gianni Caldana has won 5 times the individual national championship.

- 5 wins in the 110 metres hurdles (1935, 1936, 1937, 1938, 1940)

== See also ==
- Men's long jump Italian record progression
