= Foy Draper =

American track and field athlete

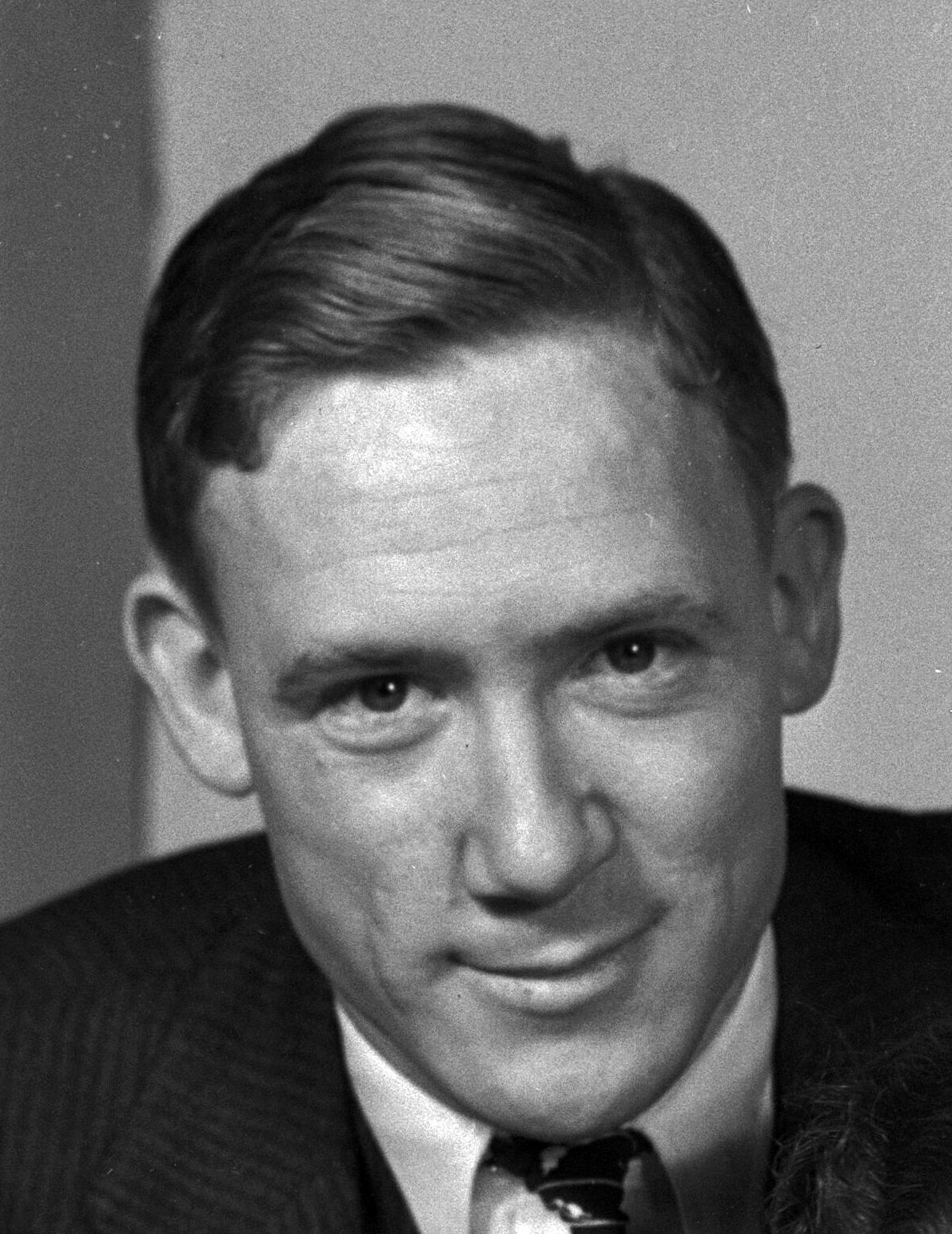
- Draper in 1936

Personal information
- Born: November 26, 1911 Georgetown, Texas, United States
- Died: February 1, 1943 (aged 31) Kasserine Pass, Kasserine, Tunisia
- Education: University of Southern California
- Height: 1.65 m (5 ft 5 in)
- Weight: 54 kg (119 lb)

Sport
- Sport: Track and field
- Event: 100 m
- Club: USC Trojans, Los Angeles

Achievements and titles
- Personal best: 100 m – 10.3 (1936)
Medal record
Representing the United States
Olympic Games
Gold medal – first place	1936 Berlin	4 × 100 m relay

Foy Draper (November 26, 1911 – February 1, 1943) was an American track and field athlete who won a gold medal in 4 × 100 m relay at the 1936 Summer Olympics. As a University of Southern California student, Draper won the IC4A championships in 200 m in 1935.

He reportedly held the world record for the 100-yard dash, which at the time would have been a hand-timed 9.4, made all the more remarkable by Draper standing only 5 feet 5 inches (1.65 m).

At the Berlin Olympics, Draper ran the third leg in the American 4 × 100 m relay team, which won the gold medal in a world record time of 39.8.

During World War II, Draper served as a pilot on a twin-engine attack bomber A-20B 'Havoc' in Thelepte, Tunisia. On January 4, 1943, Draper took off to take part in the battle of Kassarine Pass. Draper and his two crewmen never returned and his death date is usually given as February 1, 1943. He is buried in the North Africa American Cemetery and Memorial administered by the American Battle Monuments Commission in Carthage, Tunisia. His gravestone shows January 4, 1943 as his date of death.
