= Elio Ragni =

Italian sprinter (1910–1998)

Personal information
- Nationality: Italian
- Born: 5 December 1910 Milan, Italy
- Died: 20 June 1998 (aged 87)
- Height: 1.78 m (5 ft 10 in)
- Weight: 64 kg (141 lb)

Sport
- Country: Italy
- Sport: Athletics
- Event: Sprint
- Club: Sport Club Italia

Achievements and titles
- Personal best: 100 m: 10.7 (1937)
Medal record
Olympic Games
Silver medal – second place	1936 Berlin	4x100 metre relay

Elio Ragni (5 December 1910 – 20 June 1998) was an Italian athlete who competed mainly in the 100 metres.

== Biography ==
He competed for Italy in the 1936 Summer Olympics held in Berlin, Germany in the 4 x 100 metre relay where he won the silver medal with his team mates Orazio Mariani, Gianni Caldana and Tullio Gonnelli.

== Olympic results ==
Year	Competition	Venue	Position	Event	Performance	Notes
1936	Olympic Games	(Germany) Berlin	2nd	4 × 100 m relay	41.1	

== See also ==
- Italy national relay team
