= Bob Hamerton =

Canadian swimmer

Personal information
- Full name: Robert Williams Hamerton
- Born: 28 April 1911 Winnipeg, Manitoba, Canada
- Died: 17 June 1990 (aged 79)

Sport
- Sport: Swimming

Bob Hamerton (28 April 1911 – 17 June 1990) was a Canadian swimmer. He competed in four events at the 1936 Summer Olympics.

In 1991, Hamerton was inducted into the Manitoba Sports Hall of Fame.
