= George Crompton (cyclist) =

Canadian cyclist

Personal information
- Born: 8 December 1913
- Died: 18 July 1971 (aged 57) Toronto, Ontario, Canada

Cycling career
- Sport: Cycling

Major wins
- Canadian Champion 1936

George Thomas Crompton (8 December 1913 – 18 July 1971) was a Canadian cyclist. He competed in the three events at the 1936 Summer Olympics. Crompton died at his home in Toronto in 1971.
