= Toivo Ahjopalo =

Finnish sprinter

Personal information
- Nationality: Finnish
- Born: 2 June 1913 Hausjärvi, Finland
- Died: 13 January 2000 (aged 86) Lahti, Finland

Sport
- Sport: Sprinting
- Event: 100 metres

Toivo Ahjopalo (2 June 1913 – 13 January 2000) was a Finnish sprinter. He competed in the men's 100 metres at the 1936 Summer Olympics.
