= Mario Minai =

Hungarian sprinter

Personal information
- Nationality: Hungarian
- Born: 6 July 1912

Sport
- Sport: Sprinting
- Event: 200 metres

Mario Minai (born 6 July 1912, date of death unknown) was a Hungarian sprinter. He competed in the men's 200 metres at the 1936 Summer Olympics.
