= Mutsuo Taniguchi =

Japanese sprinter

Personal information
- Nationality: Japanese
- Born: 5 March 1913 Kagami, Japan
- Died: 2 October 1943 (aged 30) Bougainville, Solomon Islands

Sport
- Sport: Sprinting
- Event: 200 metres

Mutsuo Taniguchi (5 March 1913 – 2 October 1943) was a Japanese sprinter. He competed in the men's 200 metres and the men's 4 x 100 meters relay events at the 1936 Summer Olympics. He was killed in action during World War II.
