= Åke Stenqvist =

Swedish athlete (1914-2006)

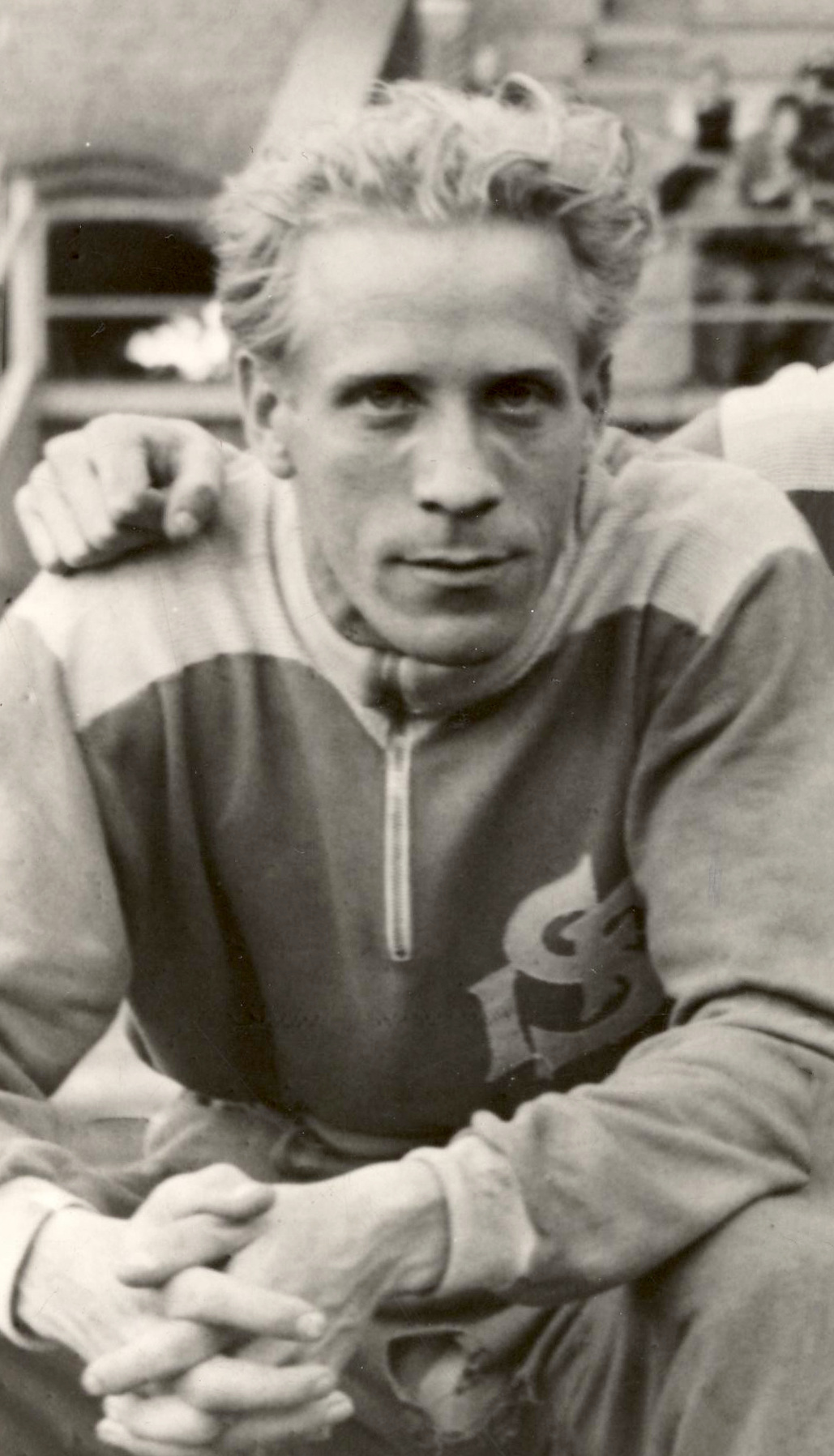

Personal information
- Full name: Åke Valter Stenqvist
- Born: 31 January 1914 Stockholm, Sweden
- Died: 23 February 1983 (aged 77) Stockholm, Sweden
- Height: 1.81 m (5 ft 11 in)
- Weight: 76 kg (168 lb)

Sport
- Sport: Athletics
- Event(s): Sprint, long jump
- Club: IK Mode, Stockholm

Achievements and titles
- Personal best(s): 100 m – 10.7 (1938); LJ – 7.47 m (1937)
Medal record
Men's athletics
Representing Sweden
European Championships
Silver medal – second place	1938 Paris	4×100 m relay

Åke Valter Stenqvist (31 January 1914 – 12 August 2006) was a Swedish athlete who specialized in the 100 m sprint and long jump. He competed in the 4 × 100 m relay and long jump at the 1936 Summer Olympics and finished 10th in the long jump. Later he won a silver medal in the relay at the 1938 European Championships.

Stenqvist held national titles in the long jump (1935–42) and pentathlon (1940–42); he was also an international handball player.
