= Charles Wiard =

British sprinter

Personal information
- Nationality: British
- Born: 27 October 1909
- Died: 30 November 1994 (aged 85)

Sport
- Sport: Sprinting
- Event: 4 × 100 metres relay

Charles Wiard (27 October 1909 – 30 November 1994) was a British sprinter. He competed in the men's 4 × 100 metres relay at the 1936 Summer Olympics.
