= Lionel Coleman =

Canadian cyclist

Personal information
- Born: 29 March 1918
- Died: 25 September 1941 (aged 23) Hamilton, Ontario, Canada

Cycling career
- Sport: Cycling

Lionel Coleman (29 March 1918 – 25 September 1941) was a Canadian cyclist. He competed in the three events at the 1936 Summer Olympics. He drowned at age 23 in the Hamilton harbor during a large storm.
