= Toivo Sariola =

Finnish sprinter

Personal information
- Nationality: Finnish
- Born: 26 June 1914
- Died: 3 April 1985 (aged 70)

Sport
- Sport: Sprinting
- Event: 100 metres

Toivo Sariola (26 June 1914 – 3 April 1985) was a Finnish sprinter. He competed in the men's 100 metres at the 1936 Summer Olympics.
