= Erich Borchmeyer =

German sprinter (1905–2000)

Medal record

Men's athletics

Representing Germany

Olympic Games
Silver medal – second place	1932 Los Angeles	4×100 m

European Championships
Gold medal – first place	1934 Turin	4×100 m
Silver medal – second place	1934 Turin	100 m

Representing Germany

Olympic Games
Bronze medal – third place	1936 Berlin	4 × 100 m relay

Erich Borchmeyer (23 January 1905 – 17 August 2000) was a German athlete, who competed mainly in the 100 metres.

Borchmeyer was born in Münster. He competed for Germany in the 1932 Summer Olympics held in Los Angeles, United States in the 4 × 100 metres relay, where he won the silver medal with his teammates Helmut Körnig, Friedrich Hendrix and Arthur Jonath. He also returned for the 1936 Summer Olympics held in Berlin, Germany, where he was the sole returnee of the 1932 team and teamed up with Wilhelm Leichum, Erwin Gillmeister and Gerd Hornberger to win a bronze medal.

Borchmeyer committed suicide at age 95 in a retirement home in Bielefeld.

== Competition record ==
Year	Competition	Venue	Position	Event	Notes
Representing Germany
1934	European Championships	Turin, Italy	2nd	100 m	10.7
