= George Tully (fencer) =

Canadian fencer (1914–1986)

Personal information
- Born: 29 August 1914 Montreal, Quebec, Canada
- Died: 8 September 1986 (aged 72) Montreal, Quebec, Canada

Sport
- Sport: Fencing

George Tully (29 August 1914 – 8 September 1986) was a Canadian fencer. He competed in five events at the 1936 Summer Olympics.
