= Lennart Strandberg =

Swedish sprinter

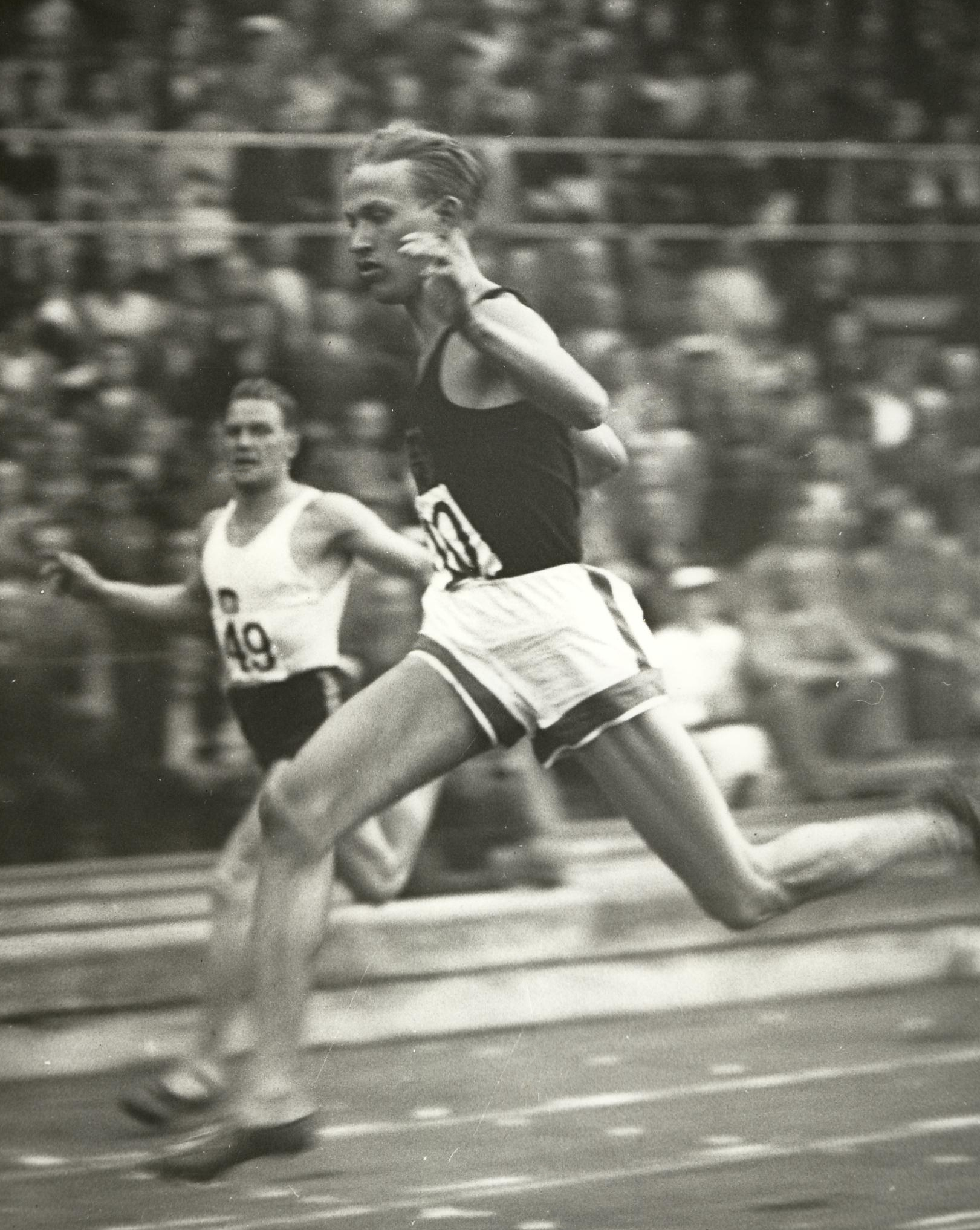
- Lennart Strandberg in the 1930's

Personal information
- Born: 26 March 1915 Malmö, Sweden
- Died: 23 December 1989 (aged 74) Ystad, Sweden
- Height: 1.87 m (6 ft 2 in)
- Weight: 75 kg (165 lb)

Sport
- Sport: Athletics
- Event: Sprint
- Club: MAI, Malmö

Achievements and titles
- Personal best(s): 100 m – 10.3 (1936); 200 m – 21.4 (1942)
Medal record
Men's athletics
Representing Sweden
European Championships
| Silver medal – second place | 1938 Paris | 4×100 m |
| Bronze medal – third place | 1938 Paris | 100 m |

Hans Lennart Olofsson Strandberg (26 March 1915 – 23 December 1989) was a Swedish sprinter. He specialized in the 100 metres event, in which he won a bronze medal at the 1938 European Championships and finished sixth at the 1936 Summer Olympics. In 1938, he also won a silver medal with the Swedish 4 × 100 m relay team.

Strandberg held Swedish titles in the 100 m (1934–1938, 1940–1943, 1945 and 1947), 200 m (1934–1945), 4 × 100 m (1934–1938, 1942–1944, 1946–1947 and 1950–1952) and 4 × 400 m events (1935, 1937 and 1939). His 1936 Swedish record in the 100 m equaled the world record. His son Bobby was a national sprint coach in the 1960s.
