= Monta Suzuki =

Japanese sprinter

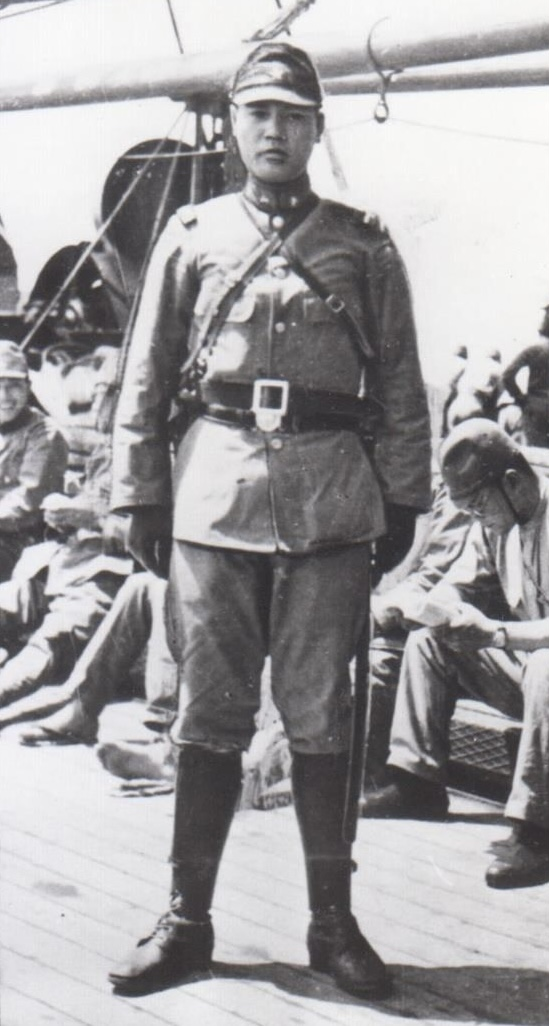

Personal information
- Native name: 鈴木 聞多
- Nationality: Japanese
- Born: 1 April 1913 Saitama Prefecture, Japan
- Died: 10 July 1939 (aged 26) China

Sport
- Sport: Sprinting
- Event: 100 metres

Monta Suzuki (鈴木 聞多, Suzuki Monta; 1 April 1913 – 10 July 1939) was a Japanese sprinter. He competed in the men's 100 metres at the 1936 Summer Olympics. He died at the front in China on 10 July 1939 during the Second Sino-Japanese War while serving as a lieutenant in the Imperial Japanese Army.
