= Egon Schein =

German sprinter

Medal record

Men's athletics

Representing Germany

European Championships
Gold medal – first place	1934 Turin	4×100 m

Egon Karl Otto Klaus Christian Schein (20 January 1912 in Kiel – 14 February 1977 in Hamburg) was a German athlete who competed in the 1936 Summer Olympics.

== Competition record ==
Year	Competition	Venue	Position	Event	Notes
Representing (Germany)
1934	European Championships	Turin, Italy	5th	200 m	21.9
