= Bertrand Boissonnault =

Canadian fencer

Personal information
- Born: 10 January 1907 Montreal, Quebec, Canada
- Died: 30 September 1995 (aged 88)

Sport
- Sport: Fencing

Bertrand Boissonnault (10 January 1907 – 30 September 1995) was a Canadian fencer. He competed in the team foil and individual épée events at the 1936 Summer Olympics.
