= Aki Tammisto =

Finnish sprinter

Personal information
- Nationality: Finnish
- Born: 1 March 1915 Leppävirta, Finland
- Died: 23 March 1978 (aged 63) Turku, Finland

Sport
- Sport: Sprinting
- Event: 200 metres

Aki Tammisto (1 March 1915 – 23 March 1978) was a Finnish sprinter. He competed in the men's 200 metres at the 1936 Summer Olympics.
