= Palle Virtanen =

Finnish sprinter

Personal information
- Nationality: Finnish
- Born: 19 September 1910
- Died: 30 September 2000 (aged 90)

Sport
- Sport: Sprinting
- Event: 100 metres

Palle Virtanen (19 September 1910 – 30 September 2000) was a Finnish sprinter. He competed in the men's 100 metres at the 1936 Summer Olympics.
