= Alan Pennington =

British sprinter (1916–1961)

Personal information
- Nationality: British (English)
- Born: 4 April 1916 Wallasey, England
- Died: 2 June 1961 (aged 45) Lisbon, Portugal
- Height: 178 cm (5 ft 10 in)
- Weight: 68 kg (150 lb)

Sport
- Sport: Athletics
- Event: 100 metres/440 yards
- Club: Wallasey AC; University of Oxford AC; Achilles Club
Medal record
Men's athletics
Representing Great Britain
European Championships
| Silver medal – second place | 1938 Paris | 4×400 m |
| Bronze medal – third place | 1938 Paris | 200 metres |

Alan Pennington (4 April 1916 – 2 June 1961) was a British sprinter. He competed in the men's 100 metres at the 1936 Summer Olympics.

== Biography ==
Pennington reached the semi-final of the 100 metres event at the 1936 Summer Olympics.

Pennington finished second behind Godfrey Brown in the 440 yards event at the 1938 AAA Championships and shortly afterwards in September, won a bronze medal at the 1938 European Athletics Championships.

Pennington became the national 440 yards champion at the 1939 AAA Championships.

Pennington served in World War II reaching the rank of Captain. He died by suicide in a hotel room in Lisbon.
