= Pat Dannaher =

South African sprinter

Personal information
- Nationality: South African
- Born: 16 October 1912 Bloemfontein, South Africa
- Died: 2 February 1999 (aged 86) Bloemfontein, South Africa

Sport
- Sport: Sprinting
- Event: 100 metres

Pat Dannaher (16 October 1912 – 2 February 1999) was a South African sprinter. He competed in the men's 100 metres at the 1936 Summer Olympics.
