= Sam Richardson (athlete) =

Canadian athlete (1917–1988)

Medal record

Men's athletics

Representing Canada

British Empire Games
Gold medal – first place	1934 London	Long jump
Silver medal – second place	1934 London	Triple jump

Samuel Cromwell Richardson (17 November 1917 – 8 October 1988) was a Canadian athlete who competed in the 1936 Summer Olympics. He was born in Toronto. In 1936 he was a member of the Canadian relay team which finished fifth in the Olympic 4x100 metre event. In the long jump competition he finished 14th and in the triple jump contest he finished 20th. At the 1934 British Empire Games he won the gold medal in the long jump event and the silver medal in the triple jump competition.

Richardson was of African American descent and the son of a World War I veteran.

There is some dispute about Richardson's date of birth, with various sources indicating that he may have been born in 1919 or even 1921.
