= Thelma Boughner =

Canadian diver

Personal information
- Born: September 27, 1918 Toronto, Canada
- Died: October 29, 2017 (aged 99) Toronto, Canada

Sport
- Sport: Diving

Thelma Boughner (27 September 1918 – 29 October 2017) was a Canadian diver who competed in the 1936 Summer Olympics. She was born in Toronto, Ontario.
