= Paul Bronner =

French sprinter

Personal information
- Nationality: French
- Born: 18 May 1913
- Died: 18 November 1976 (aged 63)

Sport
- Sport: Sprinting
- Event: 100 metres

Paul Bronner (18 May 1913 – 18 November 1976) was a French sprinter. He competed in the men's 100 metres at the 1936 Summer Olympics.
