= Tomás Beswick =

Argentine sprinter (1911–1980)

Thomas Clifford (Tomás) Beswick
Personal information
- Nationality: Argentine
- Born: 17 October 1911 West Bromwich, West Midlands, England
- Died: 27 July 1980 (aged 68) San Isidro, Argentina

Sport
- Sport: Sprinting
- Event: 100 metres

Tomás Beswick (17 October 1911 – 27 July 1980) was an Argentine sprinter. He competed in the men's 100 metres at the 1936 Summer Olympics.
