= Tinus Osendarp =

Dutch sprinter and WW2 collaborator (1916–2002)

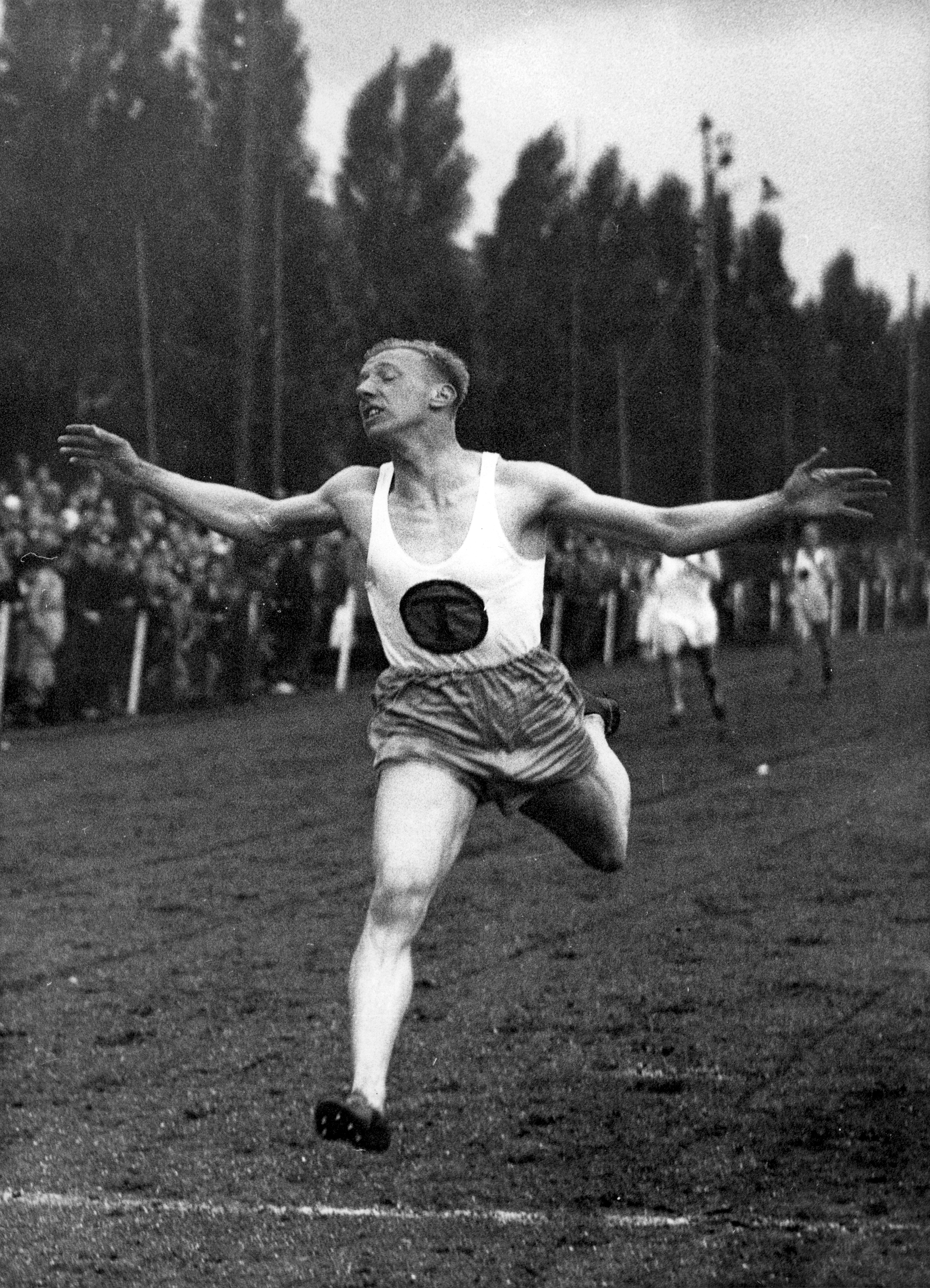
- Tinus Osendarp in 1936

Personal information
- Full name: Martinus Bernardus Osendarp
- Born: 21 May 1916 Delft, Netherlands
- Died: 20 June 2002 (aged 86) Heerlen, Netherlands
- Height: 1.76 m (5 ft 9 in)
- Weight: 80 kg (176 lb)

Sport
- Sport: Sprint running
- Club: De Trekvogels, Den Haag
Medal record
Men's athletics
Representing the Netherlands
Olympic Games
| Bronze medal – third place | 1936 Berlin | 100 m |
| Bronze medal – third place | 1936 Berlin | 200 m |
European Championships
| Gold medal – first place | 1938 Paris | 100 m |
| Gold medal – first place | 1938 Paris | 200 m |
| Bronze medal – third place | 1934 Turin | 200 m |
| Bronze medal – third place | 1934 Turin | 4×100 m |

Martinus Bernardus "Tinus" Osendarp (Dutch: [mɑrˈtinʏz bɛrˈnɑrdʏs ˈtinʏs ˈoːsə(n)ˌdɑr(ə)p]; 21 May 1916 – 20 June 2002) was a Dutch sprint runner.

== Sporting career ==
Osendarp was a football player and started training in sprint for fun. His first international success came at the 1934 European Championships where he won bronze medals in the 200 m and 4 × 100 m relay. Osendarp won the British AAA Championships title in the 220 yards event and finished second behind Arthur Sweeney in the 100 yards event at the 1935 AAA Championships. The following July he won the 100 yards event at the 1936 AAA Championships.

He won another two bronze medals at the 1936 Summer Olympics in Berlin, in the 100 m and 200 m sprint events. The games were held in Nazi Germany and Osendarp gained some fame as the fastest white sprinter behind the black Americans. A possible third medal was lost when Osendarp dropped the baton in the final of the 4 × 100 m relay while fighting for second place. Contested on the second day of the games, drenching rain made the track soggy and slow for the running of the 100 metre dash semi-finals. Despite the unfavorable conditions Osendarp still managed a time of 10.6 s, right behind American Ralph Metcalfe. In the 100 metres final he ran 10.5 s, behind Americans Jesse Owens 10.3 s, and Ralph Metcalfe 10.4 s. Upon his return home Osendarp was called "the best white sprinter" by the Dutch press.

The basis for his future involvement in National Socialism was laid in Berlin, where he first came under the influence of SS propaganda.

In 1938 Osendarp won two European titles in the 100 m and 200 m, equalling the 1934 performance of his compatriot Chris Berger. He also won another British AAA title at the 1938 AAA Championships.

== Later life ==
When Germany occupied the Netherlands in 1940, Osendarp was working as a police officer in The Hague. He subsequently joined the Dutch national socialist NSB party in 1941 and the volunteer SS in 1943 as part of the Sicherheitsdienst (SD). During this period, Osendarp helped arrest several members of the Dutch resistance and helped in the deportation of Dutch Jews.

In 1948, Osendarp was sentenced to 12 years in jail for acts he committed during the war. He was moved to Limburg to work in the coal mines and released early in 1953. In 1958 he also became athletics coach at Kimbria in Maastricht, and from 1972 he was a coach at Achilles-Top in Kerkrade. He died in 2002 at the age of 86 in Heerlen.

== Competition record ==
| Year | Competition | Venue | Position | Event | Notes |
Representing Netherlands
| 1934 | European Championships | Turin, Italy | 5th | 100 m | 10.9 |
| 1934 | European Championships | Turin, Italy | 3rd | 200 m | 21.6 |
| 1934 | European Championships | Turin, Italy | 3rd | 4 × 100 m | 41.6 |
| 1936 | Olympics | Berlin, Germany | 3rd | 100 m | 10.5 |
| 1936 | Olympics | Berlin, Germany | 3rd | 200 m | 21.3 |

Awards
| First | Sauer Cup; 1935 | Succeeded by Wil van Beveren |
