= Manfred Kersch =

German sprinter

Medal record

Men's athletics

Representing Germany

European Championships
Gold medal – first place	1938 Paris	4×100 m

Manfred Kersch (19 September 1913 – 2 May 1994) was a German athlete who competed in the 1936 Summer Olympics.
