= Irvin Ternström =

Swedish sprinter

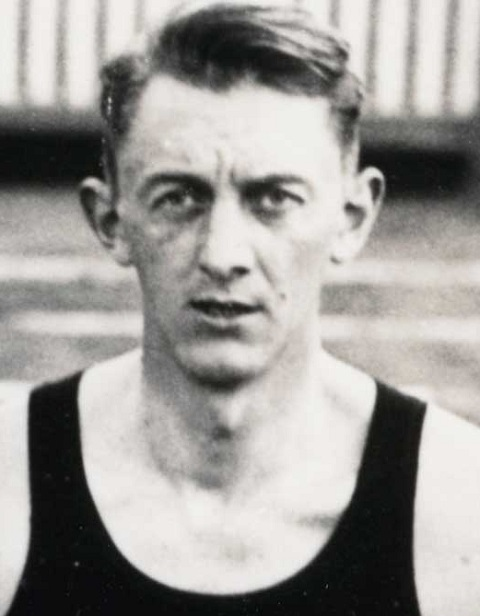

Personal information
- Nationality: Swedish
- Born: 17 March 1909 Karlshamn, Sweden
- Died: 5 February 1975 (aged 65) Karlshamn, Sweden

Sport
- Sport: Sprinting
- Event: 4 × 100 metres relay

Irvin Ternström (17 March 1909 – 5 February 1975) was a Swedish sprinter.

== Biography ==
Irvin was born in Karlshamn, Sweden. During the 1936 Summer Olympics in Berlin, he ran the second leg of the Swedish 4 × 100 meters relay, which was eliminated in the heats despite setting a national record in the event with a time of 41.5.

In 1937, Irvin's personal best was recorded as 100 – 10.5.
