= Maurice Carlton =

French sprinter

- Born: 20 November 1913
- Died: 7 May 1990 (aged 76)
- Occupation: athlete

Maurice Carlton (20 November 1913 – 7 May 1990) was a French athlete who specialized in the 100 meters. Carlton competed at the 1936 Summer Olympics.
