= Howard McPhee =

Canadian sprinter

Personal information
- Born: 11 May 1916 Sydney, Nova Scotia, Canada
- Died: 29 November 1940 (aged 24) Vancouver, British Columbia, Canada

Sport
- Sport: Sprinting
- Event(s): 100 metres, 200 metres

Howard McLeod McPhee (11 May 1916 – 29 November 1940) was a Canadian sprinter. He competed in the men's 100 metres and the men's 200 metres at the 1936 Summer Olympics.

McPhee was born in Sydney, Nova Scotia, but moved to Vancouver when he was less than a year old.

He represented Canada at the 1936 Olympics, and he was heralded by the Canadian press as "the fastest runner in Canada after Percy Williams," who won the men's 100 metres and men's 200 metres dashes at Amsterdam in 1928. McPhee competed in the 100-metre and 200-metre sprints, making it to the semi-finals in both events. His failure to qualify for the finals was attributed to his inability to adjust to the difference in climate.

McPhee graduated from the University of British Columbia in 1936. He was a physical education instructor at Grand Forks High School, and he also played rugby for Vancouver. During a Vancouver English rugby game in 1939, "McPhee ran 106 yards for a score, believed by Rugby officials to be a world record."

In August 1940, he married Lillian Brown of Vancouver. He died on the evening of Friday, November 29, 1940, following "a complete breakdown" brought about by what may have been a brain aneurysm
