= Karl Neckermann =

German sprinter

Medal record

Men's athletics

Representing Germany

European Championships
Gold medal – first place	1938 Paris	4×100 m

Karl Neckermann (14 March 1911 in Mannheim – 7 March 1984 in Mannheim) was a German athlete who competed in the 1936 Summer Olympics. Neckermann was a national champion in the 200 meters in 1935, a European champion in the 4 × 100 relay in 1938, and set a European record in the 100 metres in 1939.
