= Eric Grimbeek =

South African sprinter

Personal information
- Nationality: South African
- Born: 26 September 1908 Pietersburg, Transvaal Colony
- Died: 4 February 1995 (aged 86)

Sport
- Sport: Sprinting
- Event: 100 metres

Eric Grimbeek (26 September 1908 – 4 February 1995) was a South African sprinter.

== Professional career ==
He competed in the Men's 100 Metres at the 1936 Summer Olympics.
