= Bruce Humber =

Canadian sprinter

Personal information
- Nationality: Canadian
- Born: 11 October 1913 Victoria, British Columbia, Canada
- Died: 17 August 1988 (aged 74) Victoria, British Columbia, Canada

Sport
- Sport: Sprinting
- Event: 100 metres

Bruce Humber (11 October 1913 – 17 August 1988) was a Canadian sprinter. He competed in the men's 100 metres at the 1936 Summer Olympics.
