= Lennart Lindgren =

Swedish sprinter

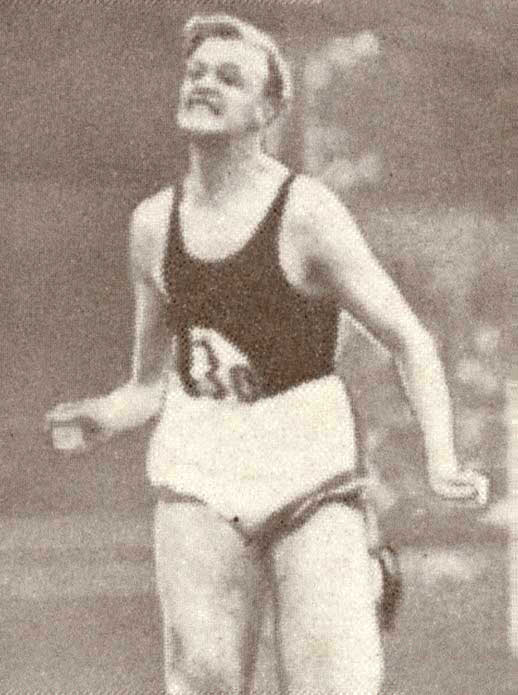

Personal information
- Born: 14 April 1915 Malmö, Sweden
- Died: 26 April 1952 (aged 37) Malmö, Sweden
- Height: 181 cm (5 ft 11 in)
- Weight: 74 kg (163 lb)

Sport
- Sport: Athletics
- Event: Sprint
- Club: Malmö AI

Achievements and titles
- Personal best: 100 m – 10.7 (1936)
Medal record
Men's athletics
Representing Sweden
European Championships
Silver medal – second place	1938 Paris	4×100 m

Erik Lennart Henry Lindgren (14 April 1915 – 26 April 1952) was a Swedish sprinter who won a silver medal in the 4 × 100 m relay at the 1938 European Championships. He competed in the 100 m and 4 × 100 m events at the 1936 Summer Olympics, but failed to reach the finals.
