= Lee Orr =

Canadian sprinter (1917–2009)

Medal record

Men's Athletics

British Empire Games
Gold medal – first place	1938 Sydney	4×440 yards

Lee Pearce Orr (April 12, 1917 – July 27, 2009) was a Canadian athlete who competed in the 1936 Summer Olympics.

He was born in Saskatchewan, Canada and grew up in Monroe, Washington, United States. During high school, he participated in track and field events, as well as football and tennis. After high school, Orr ran for the Washington State University Cougars, where he was coached by Karl Schlademan. He worked as a stock boy for $35 a month to get through school in the days before athletic scholarships. The six-foot, 175 pound freshman dazzled his coaches. He went on to eight Pacific Coast North Division titles and an NCAA championship in the 440-yard run. And he and his brother Jack ran with the Cougar relay team that set a world record in June, 1937. Orr was inducted into the Washington Athletic Hall of Fame.

In 1936 at the Berlin Olympics, he finished fifth in the 200 metre event but equaled the world record during the quarterfinals. He was also a member of the Canadian relay team which finished fifth in the Men's 4 x 100 metres relay. In the 100 metres contest he was eliminated in the first round.

At the 1938 Empire Games he won the gold medal with the Canadian team in the 4×440 yards relay event. In the 440-yard dash competition he was eliminated in the heats. Orr enlisted in the United States Army during World War II and worked for the Hormel Meat Company before retiring to Monroe.
