= Bernard Marchand =

Swiss sprinter

Personal information
- Nationality: Swiss
- Born: 31 January 1912
- Died: 2000 (aged 87–88)

Sport
- Sport: Sprinting
- Event: 100 metres

Bernard Marchand (31 January 1912 – 2000) was a Swiss sprinter. He competed in the men's 100 metres at the 1936 Summer Olympics.
