= Wil van Beveren =

Dutch sprinter (1911–2003)

Personal information
- Born: 28 December 1911 Haarlem, Netherlands
- Died: 5 October 2003 (aged 91) Emmen, Netherlands
- Height: 1.84 m (6 ft 0 in)
- Weight: 80 kg (180 lb)

Sport
- Sport: Sprint
- Club: AV '23, Amsterdam

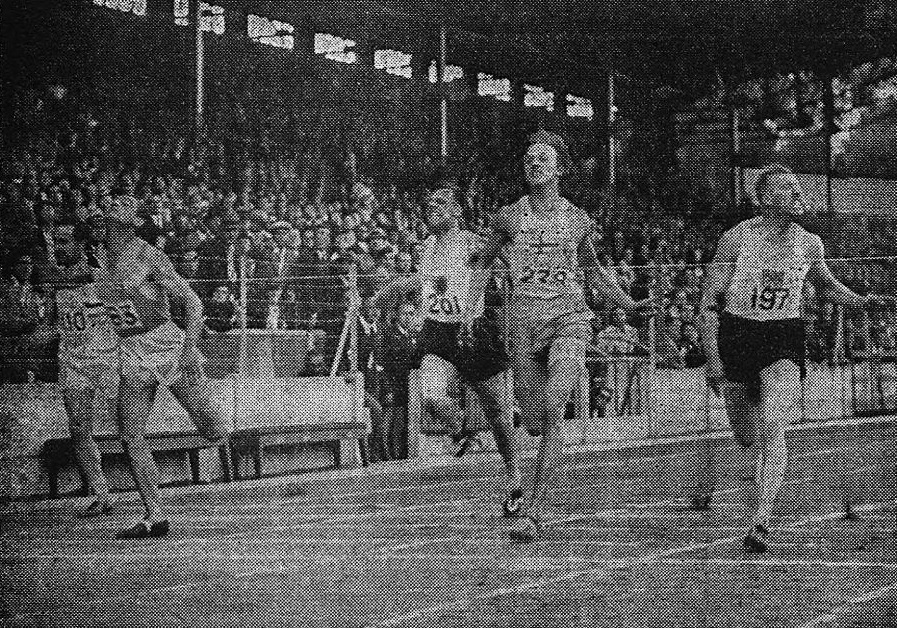
Wil van Beveren running at the 100 meter race.

Wijnand "Wil" van Beveren (28 December 1911 – 5 October 2003) was a Dutch sprinter who competed at the 1936 Summer Olympics.

== Biography ==
Van Beveren finished third behind Arthur Sweeney in the 220 yards event at the 1936 AAA Championships. One month later he was selected to represent the Netherlands at the 1936 Olympic Games held in Berlin, where he competed in the 100 metres, 200 metres and 4×100 metres relay and finished sixth in the 200 metres, running against Jesse Owens. In the relay, the Dutch team was close to a medal, but failed at a baton transfer.

Van Beveren won the British AAA Championships title in the 220 yards event at the 1938 AAA Championships. Shortly afterwards in September, Van Beveren was a medal favourite in the 100 metres at the 1938 European Athletics Championships, but finished fourth.

He won three national titles, two in the 200 metres (1937 and 1939) and one in 100 metres (1939). After World War II, he retired from competitions and became a sports journalist, first with the weekly magazine Sport & Sportwereld and then with Emmer Courant. His two sons, Jan van Beveren and Wil van Beveren Jr., became professional football players.

Awards
Preceded by Tinus Osendarp	Sauer Cup; 1936	Succeeded by Fanny Koen
