= Gyula Gyenes =

Hungarian sprinter

Personal information
- Nationality: Hungarian
- Born: 20 February 1911 Budapest, Austria-Hungary
- Died: 26 June 1988 (aged 77) Budapest, Hungary
- Height: 177 cm (5 ft 10 in)
- Weight: 75 kg (165 lb)

Sport
- Sport: Sprinting
- Event: 100 metres
- Club: MAC, Budapest
Medal record
Men's athletics
Representing Hungary
European Championships
Silver medal – second place	1934 Turin	4×100 m

Gyula Gyenes (20 February 1911 – 26 June 1988) was a Hungarian sprinter who competed at the 1936 Summer Olympics.

== Biography ==
At the 1936 Olympic Games in Berlin, he competed in the men's 100 metres.

Gyenes finished third behind Arthur Sweeney in the 220 yards event at the 1937 AAA Championships.
