= Paul Hänni (sprinter) =

Swiss sprinter

Personal information
- Nationality: Swiss
- Born: 3 October 1914
- Died: 1996 (aged 81–82)

Sport
- Sport: Sprinting
- Event: 100 metres

Paul Hänni (3 October 1914 – 1996) was a Swiss sprinter. He competed in the men's 100 metres at the 1936 Summer Olympics.

== Competition record ==
Year	Competition	Venue	Position	Event	Notes
Representing Switzerland
1934	European Championships	Turin, Italy	4th	100 m	10.8
