= 1935 International University Games =

Multi-sport event in Budapest, Hungary

The 1935 International University Games were organised by the Confederation Internationale des Etudiants (CIE) and held in Budapest, Hungary. Held from 10–18 August, a total of 774 athletes from 26 nations competed in a programme featuring ten sports. Gymnastics made its first appearance on the programme, with events for men and women.

== Sports ==
- Athletics
- Basketball
- Fencing
- Football
- Gymnastics
- Rowing
- Rugby union
- Swimming
- Tennis
- Water polo

== Athletics medal summary ==
=== Men ===
Event	Gold		Silver		Bronze	
100 metres	József Sir (HUN)	10.8	Monta Suzuki (JPN)	10.8	Maurice Scarr (ENG)	10.8
200 metres	József Sir (HUN)	21.6	Cyril Holmes (ENG)	21.8	Monta Suzuki (JPN)	21.9
400 metres	Raymond Boisset (FRA)	48.9	Felix Rinner (AUT)	49.1	Peter Rossler (GER)	49.7
800 metres	James "Hamish" Stothard (ENG)	1:56.0	George Pochat (GER)	1:56.5	Paul Faure (FRA)	1:56.6
1500 metres	Jack Lovelock (NZL)	4:00.0	Mihály Ignatz (HUN)	4:03.8	Sándor Rátonyi (HUN)	4:05.2
5000 metres	Peter Ward (ENG)	15:22.6	Hideo Tanaka (JPN)	15:24.4	András Csaplár (HUN)	15:26.0
110 metres hurdles	Erwin Wegner (GER)	14.7	József Kovács (HUN)	15.0	Tadashi Murakami (JPN)	15.3
400 metres hurdles	József Kovács (HUN)	53.2	Erwin Wegner (GER)	53.5	Fritz Nottbrock (GER)	55.7
4×100 metres relay	Hungary (HUN); József Kovács; Mario Minai; János Paizs; József Sir; Géza Nagy	41.6	Germany (GER); Erhard Pflug; Wolfgang Vent; Josef Volmert; Rudolf Zoumer	42.1	England (ENG); Cyril Holmes; Sandy Duncan; John Clark; Maurice Scarr	42.5
4×400 metres relay	France (FRA); Raymond Boisset; Paul Faure; Pierre Skawinski; Jacques Dumas	3:17.4	Germany (GER); Adolf Metzner; Hans Heinrich Nöller; Peter Rössler; Eugen Dielefeld	3:17.6	Hungary (HUN); Tibor Ribényi; József Vadas; József Verbőczy; Vilmos Kőrösi	3:22.4
1600 metres medley relay	England (ENG); Geoffrey Blake; Maurice Scarr; Cyril Holmes; James "Hamish" Stothard	3:31.2	Germany (GER); Wolfgang Dessecker; Hans Heinrich Nöller; Rudolf Zoumer; Fritz Müller	3:32.2	Czechoslovakia (TCH); Andrej Engel; Evžen Rošický; Miloš Mecír; Jiří Šulc	3:33.8
High jump	Yoshiro Asakuma (JPN)	1.94	Gustav Weinkötz (GER)	1.94	Hiroshi Tanaka (JPN)	1.94
Pole vault	Shuhei Nishida (JPN)	4.30	Sueo Oe (JPN)	4.10	Wolfgang Hartmann (GER)	4.00
Long jump	Naoto Tajima (JPN)	7.52	Luz Long (GER)	7.39	Masao Harada (JPN)	7.37
Shot put	Arnold Viiding (EST)	15.38	István Horváth (HUN)	14.56	Gerhard Stöck (GER)	14.44
Discus throw	Hans-Heinrich Sievert (GER)	46.47	Gerhard Hilbrecht (GER)	46.37	Dezsõ Józsa (HUN)	45.99
Javelin throw	Gerhard Stöck (GER)	67.80	Eugeniusz Lokajski (POL)	65.25	Gustav Sule (EST)	64.95
Pentathlon	Gerhard Stöck (GER)	3669.00	Eugeniusz Lokajski (POL)	3396.00	Fritz Müller (GER)	3332.00

=== Women ===
Event	Gold		Silver		Bronze	
100 metres	Stella Walasiewicz (POL)	12.0	Dorothy Saunders (ENG)	12.7	D. Fellehner (GER)	12.7
400 metres	Stella Walasiewicz (POL)	57.6	Irena Świderska (POL)	62.0	Käthe Erfling (GER)	62.1
80 metres hurdles	Grethe Whitehead (ENG)	12.6	Siegfriede Dempe (GER)	12.9	Katalin Vértessy (HUN)	13.0
4×100 metres relay	Germany (GER); Gisela Mauermayer; Dora Fellehner; Traute Göppner; Hilde Krölls	50.0	England (ENG); Grethe Whitehead; Margaret Cox; Margaret MacKenzie; Dorothy Saunders	50.7	Poland (POL); Stella Walasiewicz; Maria Szajna; Irena Świderska; Irena Segno	51.5
High jump	Gisela Mauermayer (GER)	1.50	Wanda Nowak (AUT)	1.45	Alise Gailīte (LAT)	1.40
Long jump	Stella Walasiewicz (POL)	5.73	Traute Göppner (GER)	5.67	Gisela Mauermayer (GER)	5.56?
Discus throw	Gisela Mauermayer (GER)	44.93	Genowefa Czejzik (POL)	35.47	Stella Walasiewicz (POL)	34.81
Javelin throw	Štepánka Pekárová (TCH)	38.19	Gerda Goldmann (GER)	36.69	Erika Matthes (GER)	34.10

== Athletics medal table ==
Rank	Nation	Gold	Silver	Bronze	Total
1	Germany (GER)	7	9	8	24
2	England (ENG)	4	3	1	8
3	Poland (POL)	3	4	2	9
4	Hungary (HUN)	3	3	5	11
5	Japan (JPN)	3	3	4	10
6	France (FRA)	2	0	1	3
7	Estonia (EST)	1	0	1	2
8	New Zealand (NZL)	1	0	0	1
9	Austria (AUT)	0	2	0	2
10	Latvia (LAT)	0	0	1	1
Totals (10 entries)		24	24	23	71

== Participating nations ==
- Austria
- Belgium
- Canada
- British Ceylon
- China
- Czechoslovakia
- Denmark
- Egypt
- Estonia
- Finland
- France
- Germany
- Greece
- Hungary
- India
- Ireland
- Japan
- Latvia
- Luxembourg
- Great Britain
- Netherlands
- New Zealand
- Poland
- Romania
- Spain
- Sweden
- United States
- Uruguay

== See also ==
- FISU World University Games § Precursors
- University and college sport
