= Athletics at the 1936 Summer Olympics – Men's 400 metres hurdles =

Men's 400 metres hurdles at the Games of the XI Olympiad
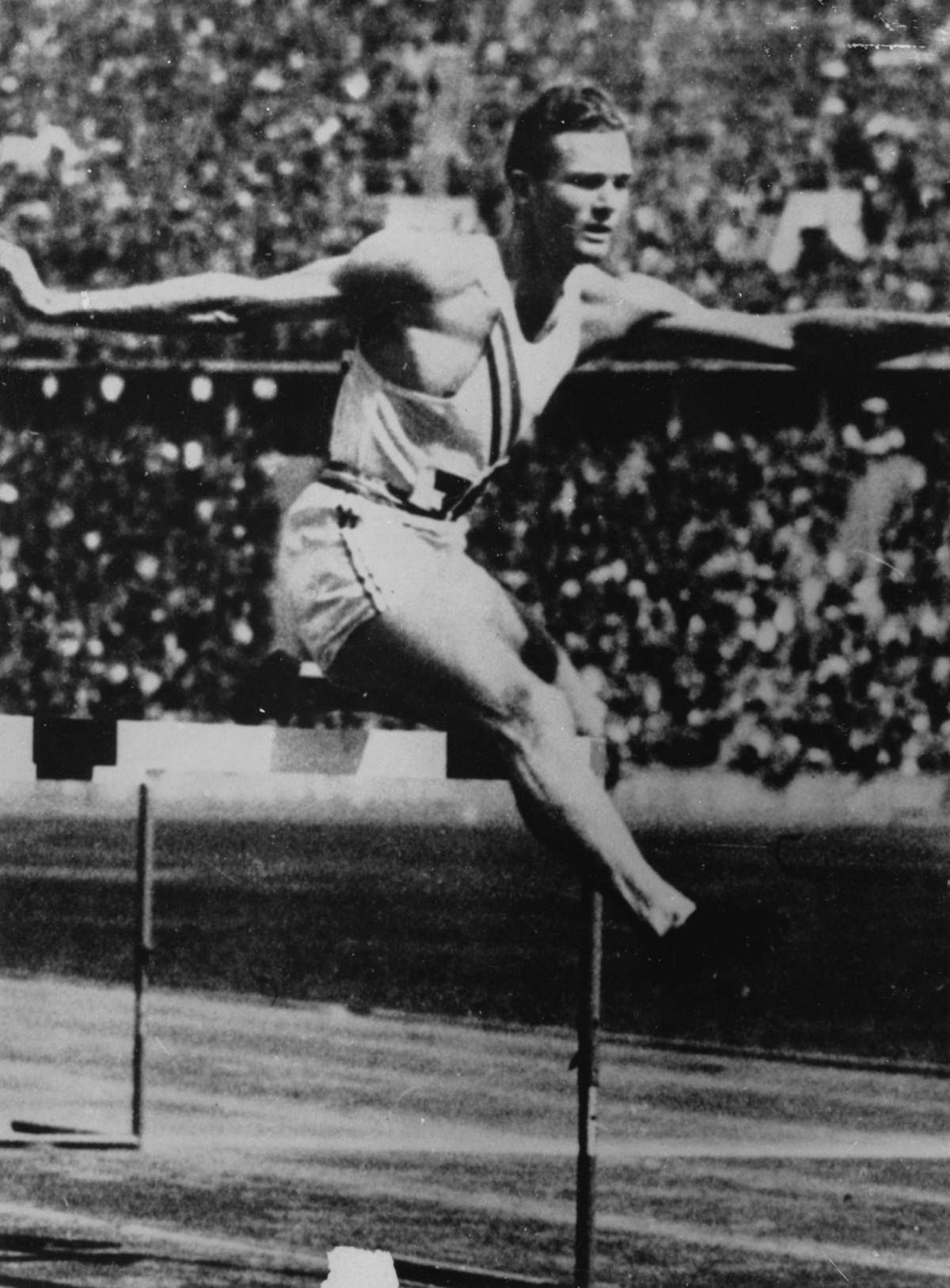
- Glenn Hardin
- Venue: Olympiastadion
- Dates: August 3, 1936 (quarterfinals); August 4, 1936 (semifinals, final)
- Competitors: 32 from 20 nations
- Winning time: 52.4

Medalists
1st place, gold medalist(s)		Glenn Hardin; United States
2nd place, silver medalist(s)		John Loaring; Canada
3rd place, bronze medalist(s)		Miguel White; Philippines

The men's 400 metres hurdles event at the 1936 Summer Olympic Games took place on August 3 and August 4. There were 32 competitors from 20 nations. The maximum number of athletes per nation had been set at 3 since the 1930 Olympic Congress. The final was won by American Glenn Hardin. After two Games of silver and bronze medals, it was the United States' first victory since 1920 and sixth overall. However, it was the first time since 1900 that the Americans had only one medalist in the event. John Loaring took Canada's first 400 metres hurdles medal since 1900 with his silver. Miguel White gave the Philippines a bronze in its 400 metres hurdles debut.

== Background ==
This was the eighth time the event was held. It had been introduced along with the men's 200 metres hurdles in 1900, with the 200 being dropped after 1904 and the 400 being held through 1908 before being left off the 1912 programme. However, when the Olympics returned in 1920 after World War I, the men's 400 metres hurdles was back and would continue to be contested at every Games thereafter.

Three of the six finalists from the 1932 Games returned: silver medalist Glenn Hardin of the United States, fifth-place finisher Luigi Facelli of Italy, and sixth-place finisher Kell Areskoug of Sweden. Hardin held the Olympic record, as the 1932 winner (Bob Tisdall) had knocked over a hurdle, as well as the world record which he had dropped from 52.0 seconds to 51.8 and then to 50.6 seconds in 1934. Hardin had not lost a 400 metres hurdles race since being beaten by Tisdall in that Los Angeles 1932 final.

Austria, the Philippines, and Yugoslavia each made their debut in the event. The United States made its eighth appearance, the only nation to have competed at every edition of the event to that point.

== Competition format ==
The competition featured the three-round format introduced in 1908: quarterfinals, semifinals, and a final. Ten sets of hurdles were set on the course. The hurdles were 3 feet (91.5 centimetres) tall and were placed 35 metres apart beginning 45 metres from the starting line, resulting in a 40 metres home stretch after the last hurdle. The 400 metres track was standard.

There were 6 quarterfinal heats, with between 4 and 6 athletes each. The top 2 men in each quarterfinal advanced to the semifinals. The 12 semifinalists were divided into 2 semifinals of 6 athletes each, with the top 3 in each semifinal advancing to the 6-man final.

== Records ==
These were the standing world and Olympic records (in seconds) prior to the 1936 Summer Olympics.

World record	Glenn Hardin (USA)	50.6	Stockholm, Sweden	26 July 1934
Olympic record	Glenn Hardin (USA)	52.0	Los Angeles, United States	1 August 1932

No new world or Olympic records were set during the competition.

== Schedule ==
The semifinals were held on the day of the final instead of the day of the quarterfinals.

Date	Time	Round
Monday, 3 August 1936	15:00	Round 1
Tuesday, 4 August 1936	15:00; 17:30	Semifinals; Final

== Results ==
The fastest two runners in each of the six heats advanced to the semifinal round.

=== Quarterfinals ===
==== Quarterfinal 1 ====
Rank	Athlete	Nation	Time	Notes
1	József Kovács	Hungary	53.7	Q
2	Juul Bosmans	Belgium	53.8	Q
3	Prudent Joye	France	54.1	
4	Tokio Fukuda	Japan	56.8	

==== Quarterfinal 2 ====
Rank	Athlete	Nation	Time	Notes
1	Fritz Nottbrock	Germany	54.7	Q
2	Dale Schofield	United States	54.8	Q
3	Luigi Facelli	Italy	55.1	
4	Jim Worrall	Canada	55.5	
5	Louis Gailliard	France	56.4	
6	August Banščak	Yugoslavia	1:01.5	

==== Quarterfinal 3 ====
Rank	Athlete	Nation	Time	Notes
1	Miguel White	Philippines	53.4	Q
2	Johnny Loaring	Canada	54.3	Q
3	Alf Watson	Australia	54.5	
4	Masao Ichihara	Japan	54.7	
5	Ioannis Skiadas	Greece	55.3	
6	Emilio Mori	Italy	55.6	

==== Quarterfinal 4 ====
Rank	Athlete	Nation	Time	Notes
1	Joe Patterson	United States	54.4	Q
2	Juan Lavenás	Argentina	54.5	Q
3	Hans Scheele	Germany	54.6	
4	Umberto Ridi	Italy	55.5	
5	Teodoro Malasig	Philippines	56.1	

==== Quarterfinal 5 ====
Rank	Athlete	Nation	Time	Notes
1	Khristos Mantikas	Greece	53.8	Q
2	Sylvio Padilha	Brazil	54.2	Q
3	Vane Ivanović	Yugoslavia	54.7	
4	Frank Rushton	South Africa	55.2	
5	Kell Areskoug	Sweden	55.7	
6	Walter Fritsch	Chile	58.3	

==== Quarterfinal 6 ====
Rank	Athlete	Nation	Time	Notes
1	Glenn Hardin	United States	53.9	Q
2	Willi Kürten	Germany	54.6	Q
3	Ernst Leitner	Austria	54.9	
4	Ernst Berndt	Czechoslovakia	57.6	
5	John Sheffield	Great Britain	58.1	

=== Semifinals ===
The fastest three runners in each of the two heats advanced to the final round.

==== Semifinal 1 ====
Rank	Athlete	Nation	Time	Notes
1	Glenn Hardin	United States	53.2	Q
2	Miguel White	Philippines	53.4	Q
3	Khristos Mantikas	Greece	53.5	Q
4	Dale Schofield	United States	53.5	
5	Juan Lavenás	Argentina	54.5	
6	Willi Kürten	Germany	54.5	

==== Semifinal 2 ====
Rank	Athlete	Nation	Time	Notes
1	Joe Patterson	United States	52.8	Q
2	Johnny Loaring	Canada	53.1	Q
3	Sylvio de Magalhães Padilha	Brazil	53.3	Q
4	Juul Bosmans	Belgium	53.4	
5	József Kovács	Hungary	54.0	
6	Fritz Nottbrock	Germany	54.8	

=== Final ===
Rank	Athlete	Nation	Time
1st place, gold medalist(s)	Glenn Hardin	United States	52.4
2nd place, silver medalist(s)	John Loaring	Canada	52.7
3rd place, bronze medalist(s)	Miguel White	Philippines	52.8
4	Joe Patterson	United States	53.0
5	Sylvio de Magalhães Padilha	Brazil	54.0
6	Khristos Mantikas	Greece	54.2

== Results summary ==
Rank	Athlete	Nation	Quarterfinals	Semifinals	Final
1st place, gold medalist(s)	Glenn Hardin	United States	53.9	53.2	52.4
2nd place, silver medalist(s)	John Loaring	Canada	54.3	53.1	52.7
3rd place, bronze medalist(s)	Miguel White	Philippines	53.4	53.4	52.8
4	Joe Patterson	United States	54.4	52.8	53.0
5	Sylvio de Magalhães Padilha	Brazil	54.2	53.3	54.0
6	Khristos Mantikas	Greece	53.8	53.5	54.2
7	Juul Bosmans	Belgium	53.8	53.4	Did not advance
8	Dale Schofield	United States	54.8	53.5	Did not advance
9	József Kovács	Hungary	53.7	54.0	Did not advance
10	Juan Lavenás	Argentina	54.5	54.5	Did not advance
11	Willi Kürten	Germany	54.6	54.5	Did not advance
12	Fritz Nottbrock	Germany	54.7	54.8	Did not advance
13	Prudent Joye	France	54.1	Did not advance	
14	Alf Watson	Australia	54.5	Did not advance	
15	Hans Scheele	Germany	54.6	Did not advance	
16	Masao Ichihara	Japan	54.7	Did not advance	
16	Vane Ivanović	Yugoslavia	54.7	Did not advance	
18	Ernst Leitner	Austria	54.9	Did not advance	
19	Luigi Facelli	Italy	55.1	Did not advance	
20	Frank Rushton	South Africa	55.2	Did not advance	
21	Ioannis Skiadas	Greece	55.3	Did not advance	
22	Umberto Ridi	Italy	55.5	Did not advance	
22	Jim Worrall	Canada	55.5	Did not advance	
24	Emilio Mori	Italy	55.6	Did not advance	
25	Kell Areskoug	Sweden	55.7	Did not advance	
26	Teodoro Malasig	Philippines	56.1	Did not advance	
27	Louis Gailliard	France	56.4	Did not advance	
28	Tokio Fukuda	Japan	56.8	Did not advance	
29	Ernst Berndt	Czechoslovakia	57.6	Did not advance	
30	John Sheffield	Great Britain	58.1	Did not advance	
31	Walter Fritsch	Chile	58.3	Did not advance	
32	August Banščak	Yugoslavia	1:01.5	Did not advance	
