= 1937 International University Games =

Multi-sport event in Paris, France

Official poster

The 1937 International University Games were organised by the Confederation Internationale des Etudiants (CIE) and held in Paris, France. Held from 21–29 August, 22 nations competed in fourteen sports. Boxing, cycling, field hockey, handball, and shooting all made their first appearance at the games. The gymnastics competition was dropped, however, and did not appear again until 1961. This tournament marked the first appearance of a South American nation, in the form of Brazil.

== Sports ==
- Athletics
- Basketball
- Boxing
- Cycling
- Fencing
- Field hockey
- Football
- Handball
- Rowing
- Rugby union
- Shooting
- Swimming
- Tennis
- Water polo

== Athletics medal summary ==
=== Men ===
| Event | Gold | | Silver | | Bronze | |
|---|---|---|---|---|---|---|
| 100 metres | Cyril Holmes (ENG) | 10.6 | Alan Pennington (ENG) | 10.7 | Theo Vogelsang (GER) | 10.8 |
| 200 metres | Cyril Holmes (ENG) | 21.5 | Aloisio Queiroz Telles (BRA) | 22.0 | Hubert Bluquette (FRA) | 22.0 |
| 400 metres | Godfrey Brown (ENG) | 47.8 | John Horsfall (ENG) | 48.2 | Ronald Wylde (SCO) | 48.2 |
| 800 metres | Jim Alford (WAL) | 1:54.1 | Hamish Stothard (ENG) | 1:54.3 | János Aradi (HUN) | 1:54.3 |
| 1500 metres | Jim Alford (WAL) | 3:56.0 | Jack Emery (ENG) | 3:57.0 | Herbert Stieglitz (GER) | 3:59.9 |
| 5000 metres | Peter Ward (ENG) | 15:21.6 | Morris Carstairs (SCO) | 15:24.2 | András Csaplár (HUN) | 15:38.2 |
| 110 metres hurdles | Paul Mathiotte (FRA) | 14.9 | Rudolf Eggenberg (SUI) | 15.2 | Carl Grampp (GER) | 15.2 |
| 400 metres hurdles | Walter Darr (GER) | 54.6 | Darcy Guimarães (BRA) | 55.0 | Fritz Nottbrock (GER) | 55.0 |
| 4×100 metres relay | England (ENG); Godfrey Brown; Sandy Duncan; Alan Pennington; Cyril Holmes | 41.8 | Germany (GER); Fritz Müller; Peter Fehring; Heinz-Wilhelm Salland; Willi Bönecke | 42.4 | France (FRA); Georges Courtin; André Dessus; Paul Mathiotte; Hubert Bluquette | 42.5 |
| 4×400 metres relay | England (ENG); John Horsfall; John Barnes; Alan Pennington; Godfrey Brown | 3:14.0 | France (FRA); Pierre Skawinski; Raymond Boisset; Paul Faure; Jacques Lévèque | 3:16.6 | Germany (GER); Wolfgang Dessecker; Josef Volmert; Peter Rössler; Walter Darr | 3:22.0 |
| 1600 metres medley relay | England (ENG); Hamish Stothard; Alan Pennington; Cyril Holmes; John Barnes | 3:28.3 | Germany (GER); Wolfgang Dessecker; Josef Volmert; Hans-Georg Steigerthal; Albert Sumser | 3:31.4 | France (FRA); Raymond Boisset; André Dessus; André Gardien; Laurent Charles | 3:34.8 |
| High jump | Gustav Weinkötz (GER) | 1.95 | Vladimír Galanda (TCH) | 1.90 | Kurt Augustin (GER) | 1.85 |
| Pole vault | Richard Webster (ENG) | 3.85 | Georgios Thanos (GRE) | 3.75 | Ervald Aarma (EST) | 3.75 |
| Long jump | Luz Long (GER) | 7.68 | Ruudi Toomsalu (EST) | 7.29 | Carl Grampp (GER) | 7.28 |
| Shot put | Aleksander Kreek (EST) | 15.17 | Adolf Kamputsch (AUT) | 14.41 | Kurt Gross-Fengels (GER) | 14.34 |
| Discus throw | Gerhard Hilbrecht (GER) | 46.25 | Dezsõ Józsa (HUN) | 45.88 | Kurt Gross-Fengels (GER) | 43.35 |
| Javelin throw | Friedrich Issak (EST) | 70.25 | József Várszegi (HUN) | 67.18 | Eduard Bartels (GER) | 65.45 |
| Pentathlon | Fritz Müller (GER) | 3824.00 | Gerhard Hilbrecht (GER) | 3433.00 | Rudolf Amsler (AUT) | 3128.00 |

=== Women ===
| Event | Gold | | Silver | | Bronze | |
|---|---|---|---|---|---|---|
| 80 metres | Dorothy Saunders (ENG) | 9.8 | Audrey Brown (ENG) | 10.0 | Huhnemorder (GER) | 10.1 |
| 200 metres | Dorothy Saunders (ENG) | 24.8 | Audrey Brown (ENG) | 25.4 | Madeleine Gravil (FRA) | 26.5 |
| 80 metres hurdles | Siegfriede Dempe (GER) | 11.7 | Annemarie Westphal (GER) | 12.2 | Grethe Whitehead (ENG) | 12.4 |
| 4×100 metres relay | Germany (GER); Annemarie Westphal; Traute Göppner; Siegfriede Dempe; Huhnemorder | 49.8 | England (ENG); Dorothy Saunders; Vida Cunliffe; Linda Whitman; Audrey Brown | 50.0 | France (FRA) | 53.9? |
| High jump | Gisela Mauermayer (GER) | 1.53 | Marjorie Gray (SCO) | 1.45 | Enid Cathcart (SCO) | 1.45 |
| Long jump | Traute Göppner (GER) | 5.39 | Gisela Mauermayer (GER) | 5.34 | Wanda Nowak (AUT) | 5.33 |
| Shot put | Gisela Mauermayer (GER) | 12.55 | Annemarie Westphal (GER) | 11.77 | Nagel (GER) | 10.24 |
| Discus throw | Gisela Mauermayer (GER) | 44.17 | Huchting (GER) | 33.28 | Nobiling (GER) | 30.41 |
| Javelin throw | Gerda Goldmann (GER) | 38.85 | Gisela Rothaus (GER) | 37.19 | Constance Lee (ENG) | 33.69 |

== Athletics medal table ==
| Rank | Nation | Gold | Silver | Bronze | Total |
|---|---|---|---|---|---|
| 1 | Germany (GER) | 11 | 6 | 12 | 29 |
| 2 | England (ENG) | 8 | 6 | 1 | 15 |
| 3 | Estonia (EST) | 2 | 1 | 1 | 4 |
| 4 | Wales (WAL) | 2 | 0 | 0 | 2 |
| 5 | France (FRA) | 1 | 1 | 4 | 6 |
| 6 | Hungary (HUN) | 0 | 2 | 2 | 4 |
| 6 | Scotland (SCO) | 0 | 2 | 2 | 4 |
| 8 | Brazil (BRA) | 0 | 2 | 0 | 2 |
| 9 | Austria (AUT) | 0 | 1 | 2 | 3 |
| 10 | Czechoslovakia (TCH) | 0 | 1 | 0 | 1 |
| 10 | Greece (GRE) | 0 | 1 | 0 | 1 |
| 10 | Switzerland (SUI) | 0 | 1 | 0 | 1 |
| Totals (12 entries) | | 24 | 24 | 24 | 72 |

== Participating nations ==
- Austria
- Belgium
- Brazil
- Czechoslovakia
- Denmark
- Egypt
- England
- Estonia
- France
- Germany
- Greece
- Hungary
- Italy
- Latvia
- Lithuania
- Luxembourg
- Mexico
- Netherlands
- Poland
- Romania
- Scotland
- Sweden
- Switzerland
- Turkey
- United States
- Wales
- Yugoslavia

== See also ==
- FISU World University Games § Precursors
- University and college sport
