= 1939 International University Games (Vienna) =

Multi-sport event in Vienna, Austria

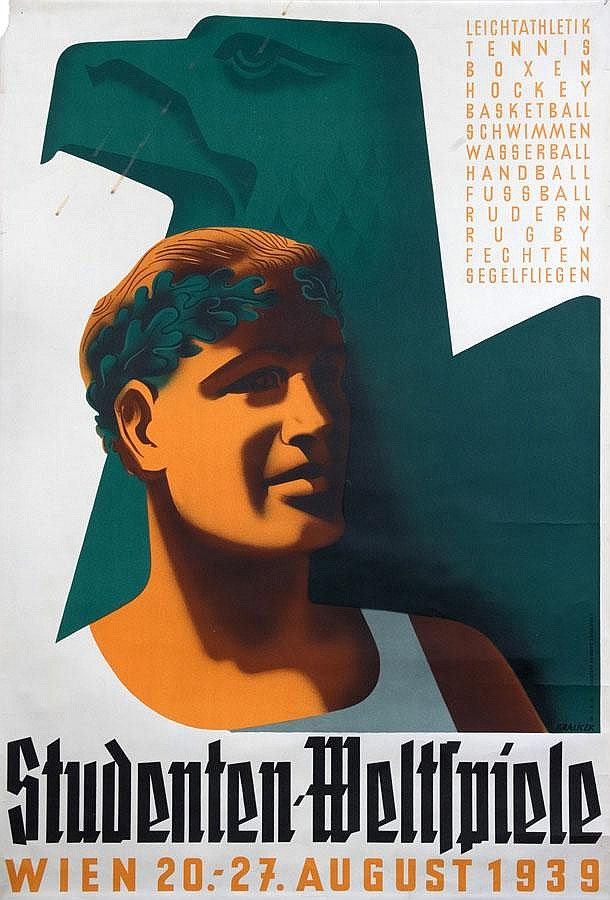
Poster

An International University Games (German: Studenten-Weltspiele) was an international multi-sport event held between 20 and 27 August 1939 in Vienna, German Reich (now Vienna, Austria), which had originally been scheduled as the official 1939 staging of the Summer International University Games awarded to Vienna by the Confédération Internationale des Étudiants (CIE) in January 1938, prior to Austria's absorption into Nazi Germany by the Anschluss. The National Socialist German Students' League (NSDStB) withdrew from the CIE in May 1939, and the CIE at short notice moved its version of the 1939 International University Games to Monte Carlo.

The formal opening was by Bernhard Rust, the Reich Minister of Science, Education and Culture, on 20 August at Prater Stadium, the main venue of the games. The International Institute of Intellectual Cooperation stated in 1940 that "the results of the Monaco Games were much superior to those of the Vienna Games."

== Participating nations ==
The NSDStB invited many nations to the Vienna games, but most entrants were nations affiliated with the Axis powers. The following countries were reported to have participated in the games:

- Kingdom of Bulgaria
- Estonia
- Finland
- Nazi Germany
- Kingdom of Hungary
- Kingdom of Italy
- Empire of Japan
- Peru
- Slovak Republic (1939–1945)
- Spanish State
- Union of South Africa
- Sweden
- Kingdom of Yugoslavia

== Athletics ==
=== Men's events ===
Event	Gold		Silver		Bronze	
100 Metres	József Sir (HUN)	10.7	Amelio Monacci (ITA)	10.8	Matsuo Taniguchi (JPN)	10.9
200 Metres	Tullio Gonnelli (ITA)	21.8	József Sir (HUN)	21.9	Ernesto Bianchi (ITA)	22.0
400 Metres	Ottavio Missoni (ITA)	48.0	Hans Helm (GER)	48.3	Karl Rinck (GER)	48.5
800 Metres	Wolfgang Dessecker (GER)	1:53.9	Gioacchino Dorascenzi (ITA)	1:54.4	János Aradi (HUN)	1:55.3
1500 Metres	Wolfgang Dessecker (GER)	3:57.2	Sándor Rátonyi (HUN)	3:58.4	Gusztáv Harsányi (HUN)	3:59.6
5000 Metres	Rolf Fellersmann (GER)	15:10.6	András Csaplár (HUN)	15:10.8	Åke Lindstedt (SWE)	15:28.6
110 Metres Hurdles	Lennart Lundberg (SWE)	15.1	Giorgio Oberweger (ITA)	15.3	Akira Kawamura (JPN)	15.4
400 Metres Hurdles	Max Meyr (GER)	54.0	Walter Darr (GER)	54.5	Jenõ Polgár (HUN)	56.0
4 x 100 Metres Relay	Germany "A"; Fritz Müller; Harald Mellerowicz; Siegfried Schmitt; Günter Köster	41.8	Italy "A"; Tullio Gonnelli; Amelio Monacci; Gianvittorio Schulteschi; Ernesto Bianchi	42.1	(Hungary) Hungary; József Sir; Ferenc Szigetvári; László Ember; József Góby	42.6
4 x 400 Metres Relay	Germany "A"; Karl Rinck; Hans Helm; Cuno Wieland; Gerhard Rose	3:15.8	Italy "A"; Gioacchino Dorascenzi; Ottavio Missoni; Aldo Ferassutti; Angelo Lualdi	3:17.2	(Hungary) Hungary; József Vadas; János Görkói; György Sándor; Jenõ Polgár	3:17.4
10 x 200 Metres Relay	Germany	3:38.3	(Italy) Italy; Ottavio Missoni; Tullio Gonnelli; Leo Craighero; Amelio Monacci; Gianvittorio Schulteschi; Ernesto Bianchi; Aldo Ferassutti; Bruno Mainardi; Giovanni Scolari; Adriano Ambrosioni	3:39.2	(Hungary) Hungary; György Sándor; László Ember; Ferenc Szigetvári; József Sir; Jenõ Polgár; József Vadas; Vilmos Vermes; József Góby; László Gábor; János Görkói	3:43.2
High Jump	Assar Persson (SWE)	1.90	Gustav Weinkötz (GER)	1.85	Renato Dotti (ITA)	1.85
Pole Vault	Rudolf Glötzner (GER)	4.10	Gian Battista Boscutti (ITA)	3.90	Bo Ljungberg (SWE)	3.90
Long Jump	Guido Bologna (ITA)	7.09	István Gyuricza (HUN)	7.03	Lennart Eliaeson (SWE)	7.01
Triple Jump	Kim Won-Kwon (JPN) (Note: Kim Won-Kwon represented Japan but was from Korea. The Japanese gave his name as Genken Kim)	15.37	Jaakko Vakkuri (FIN)	14.73	Vittorio Turco (ITA)	14.72
Shot	Gerhard Stöck (GER)	16.33	Aleksander Kreek (EST)	16.26	Kurt Gross-Fengels (GER)	14.79
Discus	Giorgio Oberweger (ITA)	48.21	Walter Buschey (GER)	47.45	Gerhard Hilbrecht (GER)	46.11
Hammer	Walter Beyer (GER)	53.54	Kurt Jancke (GER)	49.21	Michele Venanzetti (ITA)	48.85
Javelin	József Várszegi (HUN)	67.37	Karl-Heinrich Berg (GER)	67.29	Friedrich Issak (EST)	66.79
Pentathlon	Fritz Müller (GER)	3867	Fritz Lüttge (GER)	3273	Friedel Heintz (GER)	3225

=== Women's events ===
Event	Gold		Silver		Bronze	
100 Metres	Ritagret Wendel (GER)	12.4	Siegfriede Dempe (GER)	12.6	Langerbeck (GER) (Note: The source for these results gives no first name for this athlete)	13.0
200 Metres	Ritagret Wendel (GER)	25.4	Ergbuth (GER)	26.6	Lilo Stubbe (GER)	26.6
80 Metres Hurdles	Siegfriede Dempe (GER)	11.7	Annemarie Westphal (GER)	12.0	Erika Biess (GER)	12.1
4 x 100 Metres Relay	Germany "A"; Siegfriede Dempe; Ritagret Wendel; Langerbeck; Erika Biess	49.0	Germany "B"	50.5	Unknown	Unknown
High Jump	Luise Lockemann (GER)	1.50 (Note: There is uncertainty about this time per the source data)	Wanda Nowak (GER) (Note: Wanda Nowak represented Germany but was from Austria)	1.50	Editha Evers (GER)	1.50
Long Jump	Luise Lockemann (GER)	5.21	Brenner (GER)	5.19	Ergbuth (GER)	4.90
Shot	Annemarie Westphal (GER)	12.44	Gisela Schulte (GER)	12.43	Unknown	Unknown
Discus	Ruth Schönfeld (GER)	37.43	Hermine Wittmann (GER)	36.51	Gisela Schulte (GER)	35.07
Javelin	Anneliese Kahle (GER)	41.15	Ursula Klotz (GER)	38.52	Gerda Goldmann (GER)	37.60

=== Medal table ===
Rank	Nation	Gold	Silver	Bronze	Total
1	Germany (GER)	18	15	10	43
2	Italy (ITA)	4	6	4	14
3	Hungary (HUN)	2	4	5	11
4	Sweden (SWE)	2	0	3	5
5	Japan (JPN)	1	0	2	3
6	Estonia (EST)	0	1	1	2
7	Finland (FIN)	0	1	0	1
Totals (7 entries)		27	27	25	79

== Other sports ==
Military sports were held at the games, reflecting the militarism of Nazi and fascist states. Other sports included tennis, boxing, field hockey (Germany beat two Italian teams), basketball, swimming, handball, association football, rugby, rowing, fencing, gliding, and water polo (won by Hungary).
