= Athletics at the 1932 Summer Olympics – Men's 400 metres hurdles =

Men's 400 metres hurdles at the Games of the X Olympiad
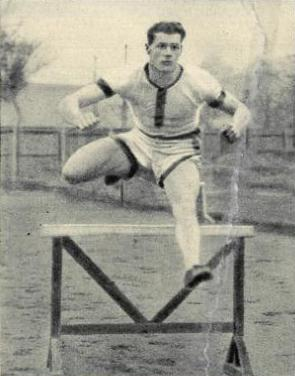
- Bob Tisdall
- Venue: Los Angeles Memorial Coliseum
- Dates: July 31, 1932 (heats and semifinals); August 1, 1932 (final)
- Competitors: 18 from 13 nations
- Winning time: 51.8

Medalists
1st place, gold medalist(s)		Bob Tisdall; Ireland
2nd place, silver medalist(s)		Glenn Hardin; United States
3rd place, bronze medalist(s)		Morgan Taylor; United States

The men's 400 metres hurdles event at the 1932 Olympic Games took place on July 31 and August 1 at the Los Angeles Memorial Coliseum. There were 18 competitors from 13 nations. The 1930 Olympic Congress in Berlin had reduced the limit from 4 athletes per NOC to 3 athletes. The event was won by Bob Tisdall of Ireland, the nation's first medal in the event in its 400 metres hurdles debut. The United States took silver (Glenn Hardin) and bronze (Morgan Taylor), extending its streak of taking at least silver in all 7 appearances of the event to that point. Taylor became the first man to earn three medals in the event, adding to his 1924 gold and 1928 bronze. Defending champion David Burghley of Great Britain finished fourth.

== Background ==
This was the seventh time the event was held. It had been introduced along with the men's 200 metres hurdles in 1900, with the 200 being dropped after 1904 and the 400 being held through 1908 before being left off the 1912 programme. However, when the Olympics returned in 1920 after World War I, the men's 400 metres hurdles was back and would continue to be contested at every Games thereafter.

Four of the six finalists from the 1928 Games returned: gold medalist David Burghley of Great Britain, bronze medalist (and 1924 gold medalist) Morgan Taylor of the United States, fourth-place finisher Sten Pettersson of Sweden, and sixth-place finisher Luigi Facelli of Italy. The field was small but competitive; Burghley and Taylor were the favorites, but strong contenders also included Bob Tisdall of Ireland (a talented decathlete with little experience in the 400 metres hurdles) and Glenn Hardin of the United States (who had won the U.S. trials despite stepping out of his lane and being disqualified from the AAU title held jointly with the trials); Hardin would go on to win Olympic gold in 1936.

Brazil, Germany, Ireland, Japan, and Mexico each made their debut in the event. The United States made its seventh appearance, the only nation to have competed at every edition of the event to that point.

== Competition format ==
The competition featured the three-round format introduced in 1908: quarterfinals, semifinals, and a final. Ten sets of hurdles were set on the course. The hurdles were 3 feet (91.5 centimetres) tall and were placed 35 metres apart beginning 45 metres from the starting line, resulting in a 40 metres home stretch after the last hurdle. The 400 metres track was standard.

There were 4 quarterfinal heats, with between 4 and 5 athletes each. The top 3 men in each quarterfinal advanced to the semifinals. The 12 semifinalists were divided into 2 semifinals of 6 athletes each, with the top 3 in each semifinal advancing to the 6-man final.

== Records ==
These were the standing world and Olympic records (in seconds) prior to the 1932 Summer Olympics.

World record	Morgan Taylor (USA)	52.0	Philadelphia, United States	4 July 1928
Olympic record	Morgan Taylor (USA)	53.4	Amsterdam, Netherlands	29 July 1928

Glenn Hardin set a new Olympic record in the first semifinal at 52.8 seconds. Bob Tisdall matched that time in the second semifinal. In the final, Tisdall finished at 51.8 seconds but was ineligible for a world record under the rules of the time as he had knocked down the last hurdle. Hardin's second-place time of 52.0 matched the world record.

== Schedule ==
Date	Time	Round
Sunday, 31 July 1932	14:30; 17:00	Quarterfinals; Semifinals
Monday, 1 August 1932	15:30	Final

== Results ==
=== Quarterfinals ===
Four heats were held; the fastest three runners advanced to the semifinals round.

==== Quarterfinal 1 ====
Rank	Athlete	Nation	Time	Notes
1	Morgan Taylor	United States	55.8	Q
2	Sten Pettersson	Sweden	56.1	Q
3	Khristos Mantikas	Greece	56.4	Q
4	Seiken Cho	Japan	56.5	
5	Alfonso González	Mexico	56.7	

==== Quarterfinal 2 ====
Rank	Athlete	Nation	Time	Notes
1	Bob Tisdall	Ireland	54.8	Q
2	Fritz Nottbrock	Germany	55.0	Q
3	Glenn Hardin	United States	55.0	Q
4	Sylvio de Magalhães Padilha	Brazil	55.1	
—	Tom Coulter	Canada	DSQ	

==== Quarterfinal 3 ====
Rank	Athlete	Nation	Time	Notes
1	Joe Healey	United States	54.2	Q
2	André Adelheim	France	54.3	Q
3	Kell Areskoug	Sweden	54.6	Q
4	Vangelis Moiropoulos	Greece	55.2	

==== Quarterfinal 4 ====
Rank	Athlete	Nation	Time	Notes
1	Luigi Facelli	Italy	55.0	Q
2	David Burghley	Great Britain	55.1	Q
3	George Golding	Australia	55.2	Q
4	Carlos dos Reis Filho	Brazil	55.8	

=== Semifinals ===
Two heats were held; the fastest three runners advanced to the final round.

==== Semifinal 1 ====
Rank	Athlete	Nation	Time	Notes
1	Glenn Hardin	United States	52.8	Q, OR
2	Morgan Taylor	United States	52.9	Q
3	David Burghley	Great Britain	53.0	Q
4	George Golding	Australia	53.1	
5	Sten Pettersson	Sweden	53.5	
6	Fritz Nottbrock	Germany	53.7	

==== Semifinal 2 ====
Rank	Athlete	Nation	Time	Notes
1	Bob Tisdall	Ireland	52.8	Q, =OR
2	Kell Areskoug	Sweden	53.2	Q
3	Luigi Facelli	Italy	53.2	Q
4	Joe Healey	United States	53.2	
5	André Adelheim	France	53.8	
6	Khristos Mantikas	Greece	Unknown	

=== Final ===
Tisdall's time was rejected as a world record as he knocked over the last hurdle, as per the rules of the time; Hardin was therefore credited as world record holder, equalling his own time of 52.0.

Rank	Athlete	Nation	Time (hand)	Time (auto)	Notes
1st place, gold medalist(s)	Bob Tisdall	Ireland	51.8	51.67	
2nd place, silver medalist(s)	Glenn Hardin	United States	52.0	51.85	=WR
3rd place, bronze medalist(s)	Morgan Taylor	United States	52.0	51.96	
4	David Burghley	Great Britain	52.2	52.01	
5	Luigi Facelli	Italy	53.0	Unknown	
6	Kell Areskoug	Sweden	54.6	Unknown	

== Results summary ==
Rank	Athlete	Nation	Quarterfinals	Semifinals	Final	Notes
1st place, gold medalist(s)	Bob Tisdall	Ireland	54.8	52.8	51.8	
2nd place, silver medalist(s)	Glenn Hardin	United States	55.0	52.8	52.0	=WR
3rd place, bronze medalist(s)	Morgan Taylor	United States	55.8	52.9	52.0	
4	David Burghley	Great Britain	55.1	53.0	52.2	
5	Luigi Facelli	Italy	55.0	53.2	53.0	
6	Kell Areskoug	Sweden	54.6	53.2	54.6	
7	George Golding	Australia	55.2	53.1	Did not advance	
8	Joe Healey	United States	54.2	53.2	Did not advance	
9	Sten Pettersson	Sweden	56.1	53.5	Did not advance	
10	Fritz Nottbrock	Germany	55.0	53.7	Did not advance	
11	André Adelheim	France	54.3	53.8	Did not advance	
12	Khristos Mantikas	Greece	56.4	Unknown	Did not advance	
13	Sylvio de Magalhães Padilha	Brazil	55.1	Did not advance		
14	Evangelos Moiropoulos	Greece	55.2	Did not advance		
15	Carlos dos Reis Filho	Brazil	55.8	Did not advance		
16	Seiken Cho	Japan	56.5	Did not advance		
17	Alfonso González	Mexico	56.7	Did not advance		
18	Tom Coulter	Canada	DSQ	Did not advance		
