= Sándor Tarics =

Hungarian water polo player

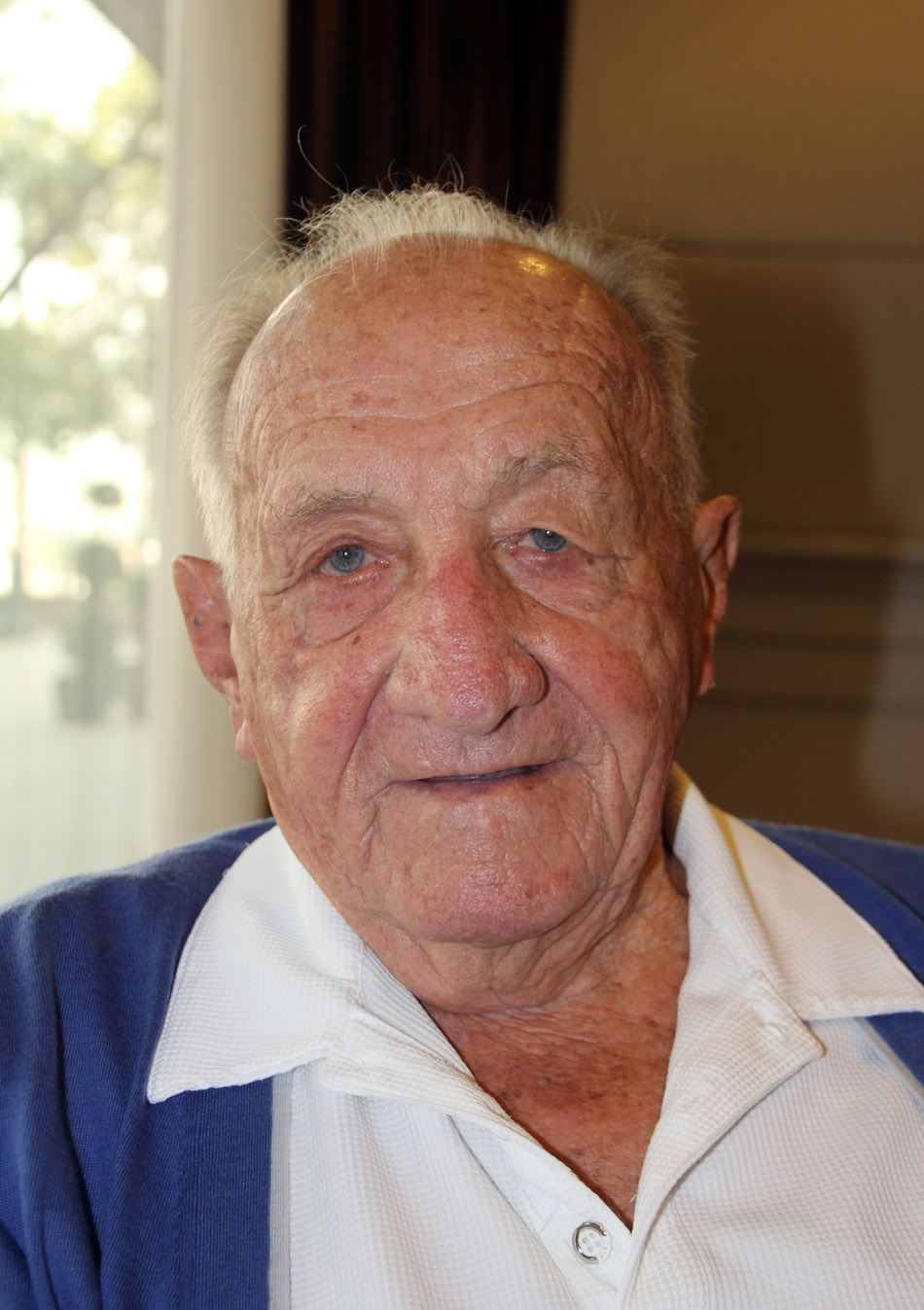
- Tarics in 2012

Personal information
- Born: 23 September 1913 Budapest, Austria-Hungary
- Died: 21 May 2016 (aged 102) San Francisco, California, United States

Sport
- Sport: Water polo
Medal record
Men's water polo
Representing Hungary
Olympic Games
Gold medal – first place	1936 Berlin	Team competition

Sándor Tarics (23 September 1913 – 21 May 2016) was a Hungarian water polo player who won a gold medal in the 1936 Summer Olympics.

== Biography ==
Born in Budapest, Tarics was part of the Hungarian team which won the gold medal, pushing Germany into second. He played two matches, and scored two goals. He also won gold medals with the Hungarian team at the 1933, 1935 and 1937 International University Games as well as the unofficial, German-led 1939 International University Games.

Tarics was able to escape post-war Soviet-occupied Hungary when his doctoral degree in engineering earned him a teaching fellowship in the United States. From 1949 to 1951, he served as a professor at Fort Wayne University, after which he took up a professorship at the California Institute of Technology. Tarics also established and grew a successful architecture and engineering practice in San Francisco. His engineering work led to several patents, including "Stadium Roof, Patent No. 226, 181, Jan. 30, 1973" and "Composite Seismic Isolator, Patent No. 5, 461, 835, Oct. 31, 1995".

He worked in the UN Commission on Earthquakes.

== Later life ==
Tarics attended the 2012 London Olympics as the oldest living Olympic champion and turned 100 in September 2013. Following the death of Attilio Pavesi, Tarics was the oldest living Olympic champion.

Tarics died in San Francisco, United States, on 21 May 2016 at the age of 102.

== See also ==
- Hungary men's Olympic water polo team records and statistics
- List of Olympic champions in men's water polo
- List of Olympic medalists in water polo (men)
- List of centenarians (sportspeople)
