= Roberts Bluķis =

Latvian ice hockey and basketball player

- Born: 4 April 1913 Riga, Governorate of Livonia, Russian Empire
- Died: 14 April 1998 (aged 85) San Mateo, California, United States
- Position: Right wing
- Played for: Rīgas US; HK ASK Rīga; Dinamo Riga
- National team: Latvia
- Playing career: 1931–1950

Roberts Bluķis (4 April 1913 – 14 April 1998) was a Latvian ice hockey and basketball player. Throughout his career, he played ice hockey for Rīgas US, HK ASK Rīga, and Dinamo Riga. Bluķis also played hockey for the Latvian national team at the 1936 Winter Olympics and in four World Championships. He finished his career after World War II with three seasons at Augsburger HC.

In basketball, he was a three-time Latvian champion and played for the Latvian national team at the 1935 and 1937 International University Games.

He studied at the Riga Technical University, earning a degree in engineering, and moved to Germany and then the United States after the Second World War. There he worked in civil service with the US Army Corps of Engineers.
