= 1938 European Athletics Championships – Men's 400 metres hurdles =

Men's 400 metres hurdles at the European Athletics Championships

The men's 400 metres hurdles at the 1938 European Athletics Championships was held in Paris, France, at Stade Olympique de Colombes on 3 and 4 September 1938.

== Medalists ==
Gold	Prudent Joye; France
Silver	József Kovács; Hungary
Bronze	Kell Areskoug; Sweden

== Results ==
=== Final ===
4 September

Rank	Name	Nationality	Time	Notes
1st place, gold medalist(s)	Prudent Joye	France	53.1	CR
2nd place, silver medalist(s)	József Kovács	Hungary	53.3	
3rd place, bronze medalist(s)	Kell Areskoug	Sweden	53.6	
4	Georg Glaw	Germany	54.2	
5	Friedrich-Wilhelm Holling	Germany	54.6	
6	Werner Kellerhals	Switzerland	55.0	

=== Heats ===
3 September

==== Heat 1 ====
Rank	Name	Nationality	Time	Notes
1	Prudent Joye	France	53.7	Q
2	Kell Areskoug	Sweden	56.1	Q
3	Per Riis	Norway	56.5	
4	Jack Barnes	Great Britain	57.3	

==== Heat 2 ====
Rank	Name	Nationality	Time	Notes
1	Werner Kellerhals	Switzerland	54.8	NR, Q
2	Georg Glaw	Germany	55.4	Q
3	Christos Mantikas	Greece	55.5	
4	Jacques André	France	58.5	
	Jules Bosmans	Belgium	DNF	

==== Heat 3 ====
Rank	Name	Nationality	Time	Notes
1	Friedrich-Wilhelm Holling	Germany	54.6	Q
2	József Kovács	Hungary	54.8	Q
3	Giuseppe Russo	Italy	54.8	
4	Werner Christen	Switzerland	56.3	

== Participation ==
According to an unofficial count, 13 athletes from 10 countries participated in the event.

- Belgium (1)
- France (2)
- Germany (2)
- Greece (1)
- Hungary (1)
- Italy (1)
- Norway (1)
- Sweden (1)
- Switzerland (2)
- Great Britain (1)
