= John Sheffield =

Jon or John Sheffield may refer to:

== English peers and politicians ==
- John Sheffield, 2nd Baron Sheffield (c. 1538–1568)
- John Sheffield (MP) (died 1614), MP for Lincolnshire (UK Parliament constituency)#MPs 1290-1640, 1601–1614
- John Sheffield, 1st Duke of Buckingham and Normanby (1648–1721), poet and politician

== Sportspeople ==
- John Sheffield (British Army officer) (1910–1987), British Army officer and Olympic hurdler
- Jon Sheffield (born 1969), English football goalkeeper

== Others ==
- John Sheffield (physicist) (1936–2026), British physicist
- Johnny Sheffield (1931–2010), American child actor
