= Prudent Joye =

French hurdler (1913–1980)

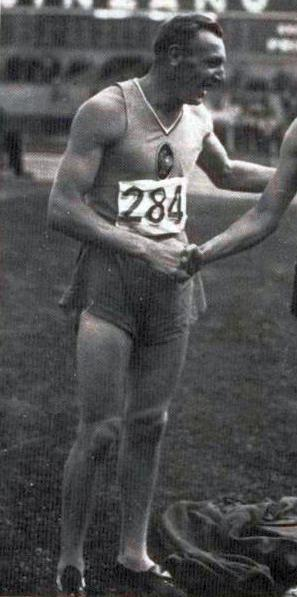

Personal information
- Nationality: French
- Born: 15 December 1913 Roubaix, Nord, France
- Died: 1 November 1980 (aged 66) Orléans, Loiret, France
- Height: 180 cm (5 ft 11 in)
- Weight: 78 kg (172 lb)

Sport
- Sport: Athletics
- Event: Hurdles
- Club: CA Français, Paris
Medal record
Men's athletics
Representing France
European Championships
Gold medal – first place	1938 Paris	400 m hurdles

Prudent Raymond Joye (15 December 1913 – 1 November 1980) was a French track and field athlete who specialised in the 400 metres hurdles. He competed for France at the 1936 Summer Olympics and won gold at the 1938 European Athletics Championships. His personal best of 53 seconds was a French record from 1938 until 1946.

== Biography ==
Born in Roubaix on 15 December 1913, he began competing at the elite level of athletics in his early twenties and broke Jean Bouin's French record on 23 July 1936, running a time of 53.4 seconds. His first major international competition came soon after when he represented France at the 1936 Summer Olympics. He ran in the heats of the men's 400 metres hurdles and was somewhat unfortunate to be eliminated as his time of 54.1 seconds was the sixth fastest of the round. However, his third-place finish in his heat meant he was not among the twelve athletes who progressed to the semi-finals. He also ran in the 4 × 400 metres relay team, which was also eliminated in the heats stage. He was virtually unrivalled on the national stage, however, and he won every French 400 m hurdles title from 1936 to 1939.

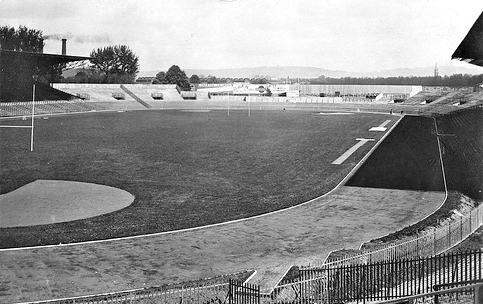
The Stade Olympique de Colombes was the venue for Joye's European victory.

Joye finished second behind Juul Bosmans in the 440 yards event at the 1938 AAA Championships before competing in his second major competition of his career, which was the 1938 European Athletics Championships and he demonstrated fine form in the weeks prior to the event by improving his French record to 53 seconds flat. The men's events were held at the Stade Olympique de Colombes in Paris and Joye was the only athlete to reach the top of the podium for the host nation. He saw off a challenge from Hungarian József Kovács to win the gold medal with a time of 53.1 seconds – just off his national record but a championship record nevertheless. He ran the anchor leg for the French 4×400 m relay team at the championships but he was beaten to the finish by Swedish runner Bertil von Wachenfeldt, just missing out on a medal by finishing fourth.

He was captured by German soldiers in 1940 and imprisoned in an internment camp. He broke free soon after and joined a group of freedom fighters in the French Resistance, looking to the overturn of the German occupation of France. He returned to the athletics scene and continued his national success, winning in 1941 and 1943, although Henri Maignan took the title in 1942. He gradually moved towards training other athletes and he received his final selection for the national team in 1945, the year that France returned to international competition.

After retiring from athletics, he became a certified kinesiotherapist through the Faculté de Médecine and moved to practice in Orléans. His French record in the 400 m hurdles stood until 1946, when it was beaten by Yves Cros who ran 52.6 seconds. He died on 5 November 1980, leaving behind a wife and five children, and his funeral was held at the Saint-Laurent church of Orléans.

== Competition record ==
Year	Competition	Venue	Position	Event
1936	Olympic Games	Berlin, Germany	3rd (heats)	400 m hurdles
1936	Olympic Games	Berlin, Germany	3rd (heats)	4 × 400 m relay
1938	European Championships	Paris, France	1st	400 m hurdles
1938	European Championships	Paris, France	4th	4 × 400 m relay
