= Alf Watson =

Australian athlete (1907-1992)

Alfred Joseph Watson
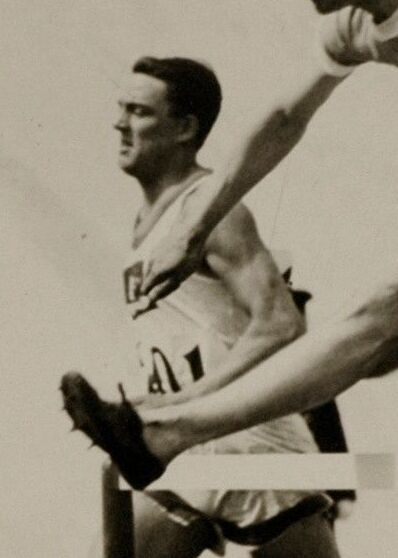

Personal information
- Nationality: Australia
- Born: 26 May 1907
- Died: 23 August 1992 (aged 85)
- Education: Ivanhoe Grammar School
- Relative: Russ Watson (brother)

Sport
- Sport: Men's athletics
Medal record
British Empire Games
Bronze medal – third place	1938 Sydney	4×110 yards

Alfred Joseph Watson (26 May 1907 – 23 August 1992) was an Australian track and field athlete who competed in the 1928 Summer Olympics and in the 1936 Summer Olympics.

== Family life ==
The son of Thomas Watson (1866-1925), and Flora Henrietta Watson (1874-1950), née Dowell, Alfred Joseph Watson was born on 26 May 1907. His eldest brother, Russell Henry Watson (1892–1941), was an Australian amateur middle distance champion, who held titles in the mile, half-mile, and 440 hurdles. Both Alf and his older brother, Edward, attended Caulfield Grammar School from 1917 to 1919.

== Early years ==
Alf then attended Ivanhoe Grammar School, for whom he sprinted and competed in the high jump; In addition to being a fine Australian Rules footballer (a member of the school's First XVIII from 1922 to 1924), he also played cricket with the school's First XI from 1921 to 1924, captaining the team in 1923 and 1924, and winning the Associated Grammar Schools' batting average in 1924 (as a consequence of which he was awarded an "exhibitioner's ticket" to the Melbourne Cricket Club).

== Competition ==
In 1928 he was eliminated in the first round of the 110 metre hurdles event as well as of the 400 metre hurdles competition.

Watson finished second behind John Sheffield in the 440 yards hurdles event at the 1936 AAA Championships.

One month later he was selected to represent Australia at the 1936 Olympic Games held in Berlin, where he was eliminated in the first round of both the 110 metre hurdles contest and the 400 metre hurdles event.

At the 1938 Empire Games he was a member of the Australian relay team which won the bronze medal in the 4×110 yards competition. In the 440 yards hurdles contest he finished fourth.

He announced his retirement from competitive athletics in November 1938.

== See also ==
- List of Caulfield Grammar School people
