= Yatta =

Yatta may refer to:

- Yatta, Hebron, a Palestinian city
- Yatta Constituency, an electoral constituency in Kenya
- Yatta Plateau, Tsavo East National Park, Kenya
- "Yatta" (song), a 2001 Japanese parody song

== See also ==
- Yada
  - Yada Yada
- Yotta-
  - Yottabyte for instance
