= Kell Areskoug =

Swedish hurdler and sprinter

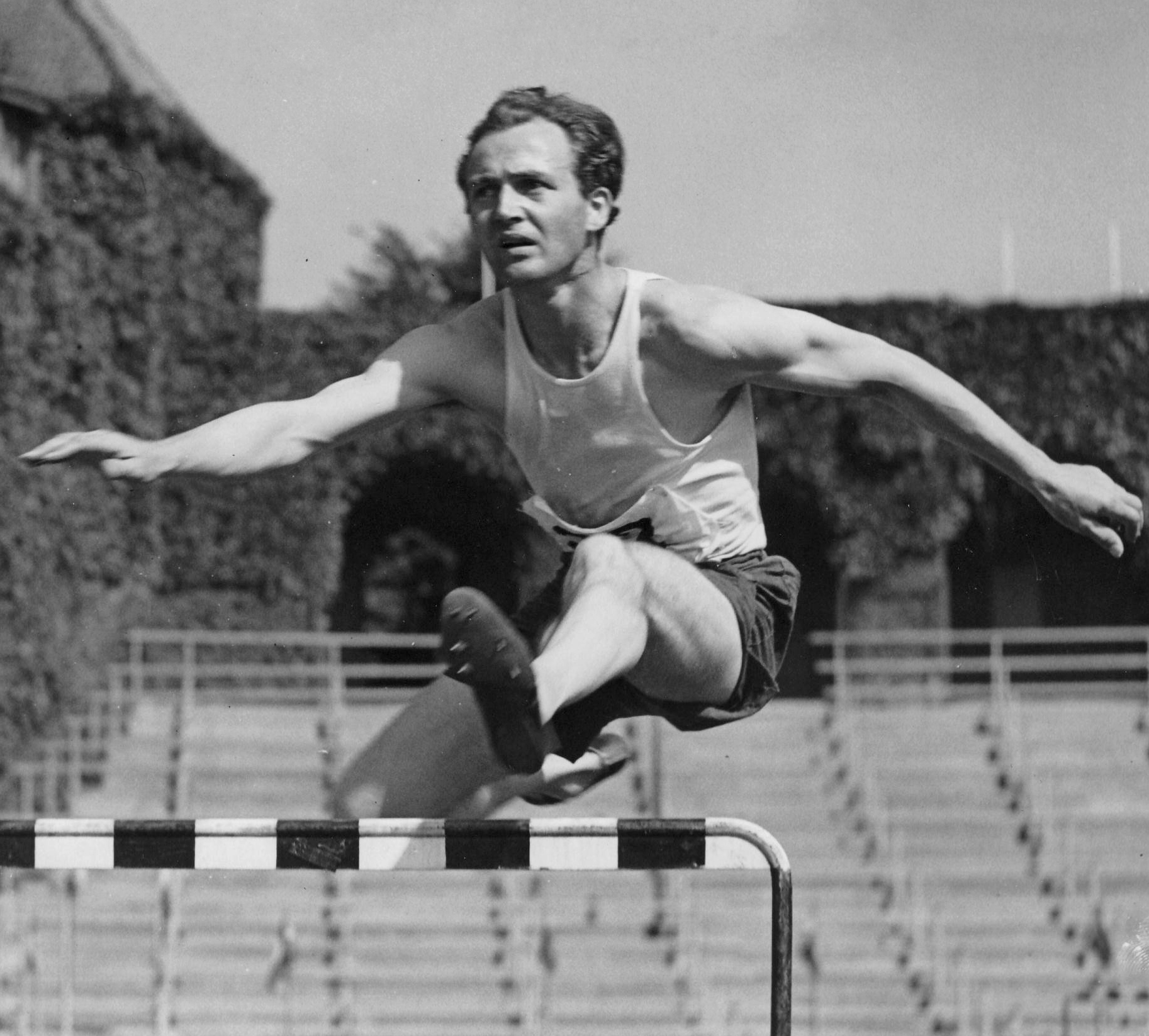

Personal information
- Born: 18 August 1906 Jönköping, Sweden
- Died: 21 December 1996 (aged 90) Dylta bruk, Örebro, Sweden
- Height: 1.75 m (5 ft 9 in)
- Weight: 65 kg (143 lb)

Sport
- Sport: Athletics
- Events: 400 m, 400 m hurdles
- Club: Örgryte IS, Göteborg

Achievements and titles
- Personal bests: 400 m – 50.6 (1930); 110 mH – 14.9 (1931); 400 mH – 53.2 (1932)
Medal record
Men's athletics
Representing Sweden
European Championships
Bronze medal – third place	1938 Paris	400 m hurdles

Johan Kellgren Areskoug (18 August 1906 – 21 December 1996) was a Swedish sprinter. He competed in the Olympics in 1932 and 1936 and won a bronze medal at the 1938 European Championships in the 400 m hurdles.

== Career ==
At the 1932 Summer Olympics in Los Angeles, Areskoug competed in both the 400 m and the 400 m hurdles. In the 400 m he went out in the heats, but in the hurdles he qualified for the final, running his personal best time of 53.2 in the semi-finals. In the final, he only managed 54.6, finishing sixth and last. Four years later in Berlin, he only competed in the 400 m hurdles, failing to qualify from the heats.

Areskoug placed third in the 400 m hurdles at the 1938 European Championships in Paris, running 53.6 and losing only to Prudent Joye and József Kovács.

Areskoug held the Swedish 400 m hurdles title in 1931, 1933, 1935–38. He placed second in the 400 m hurdles in 1929–30 and in the 110 m hurdles in 1930–31 and 1935–36.
