= Hans Möhr =

Hans Möhr may refer to:

- Hans Möhr (equestrian)
- Hans Mohr (athlete)
