= Joseph Healey =

Joseph Healey may refer to:

- Joe Healey (1910–1992), American hurdler
- Joseph G. Healey (born 1938), American priest and folklorist
