= Fritz Flachberger =

Fritz Flachberger is the name of

- Fritz Flachberger (athlete) (1912–1992), Austrian high jumper
- Fritz Flachberger (rally driver) (1948–2014), Austrian–Namibian winner of the 1995 African Rally Championship
