= Joe Haley =

Canadian high jumper (1913–1997)

Medal record

Men's athletics

Representing Canada

British Empire Games
Silver medal – second place	1934 London	High jump

Joseph Brennan Haley (October 16, 1913 – May 1997) was a Canadian athlete who competed in the 1936 Summer Olympics. He was born in Red Islands, Nova Scotia and lived in Pictou, Nova Scotia, before he moved to Trail, British Columbia at age 12.

In 1936 he finished twelfth in the Olympic high jump event. At the 1934 British Empire Games he won the silver medal in the high jump competition, losing a 'jump-off' for the gold medal against Edwin Thacker of South Africa. Four years later he finished sixth in the high jump contest at the 1938 Empire Games. Joe Haley held the Canadian high jump record. A track oval in Warfield, British Columbia was named in his honor.
