= Hiroshi Tanaka =

Hiroshi Tanaka is the name of

- Hiroshi Tanaka (high jumper) (田中 弘, born 1915), Japanese high jumper
- Hiroshi Tanaka (mathematician) (born 1931), Japanese mathematician known for the Tanaka equation
- Hiroshi Tanaka (artist) (1934–1993), Japanese actor
- Hiroshi Tanaka (field hockey) (田中 博司, born 1941), Japanese field hockey player
- Hiroshi Tanaka (manga artist) (born 1970), Japanese manga artist
- Hiroshi Tanaka (figure skater) (田中 衆史, born 1972), Japanese figure skater
