= Carlos dos Reis Filho =

Brazilian hurdler

Personal information
- Nationality: Brazilian
- Born: 20 August 1906
- Died: 11 August 1990 (aged 83)

Sport
- Sport: Track and field
- Event: 400 metres hurdles

Carlos dos Reis Filho (20 August 1906 – 11 August 1990) was a Brazilian hurdler. He competed in the men's 400 metres hurdles at the 1932 Summer Olympics.
