= Alfonso González (athlete) =

Mexican hurdler

Personal information
- Full name: Armando Alfonso González
- Born: 1910 Mexico City, Mexico

Sport
- Sport: Track and field
- Event: 400 metres hurdles

Armando Alfonso González (born 1910, date of death unknown) was a Mexican hurdler. He competed in the men's 400 metres hurdles at the 1932 Summer Olympics.
