= Glenn Hardin =

American athlete (1910–1975)

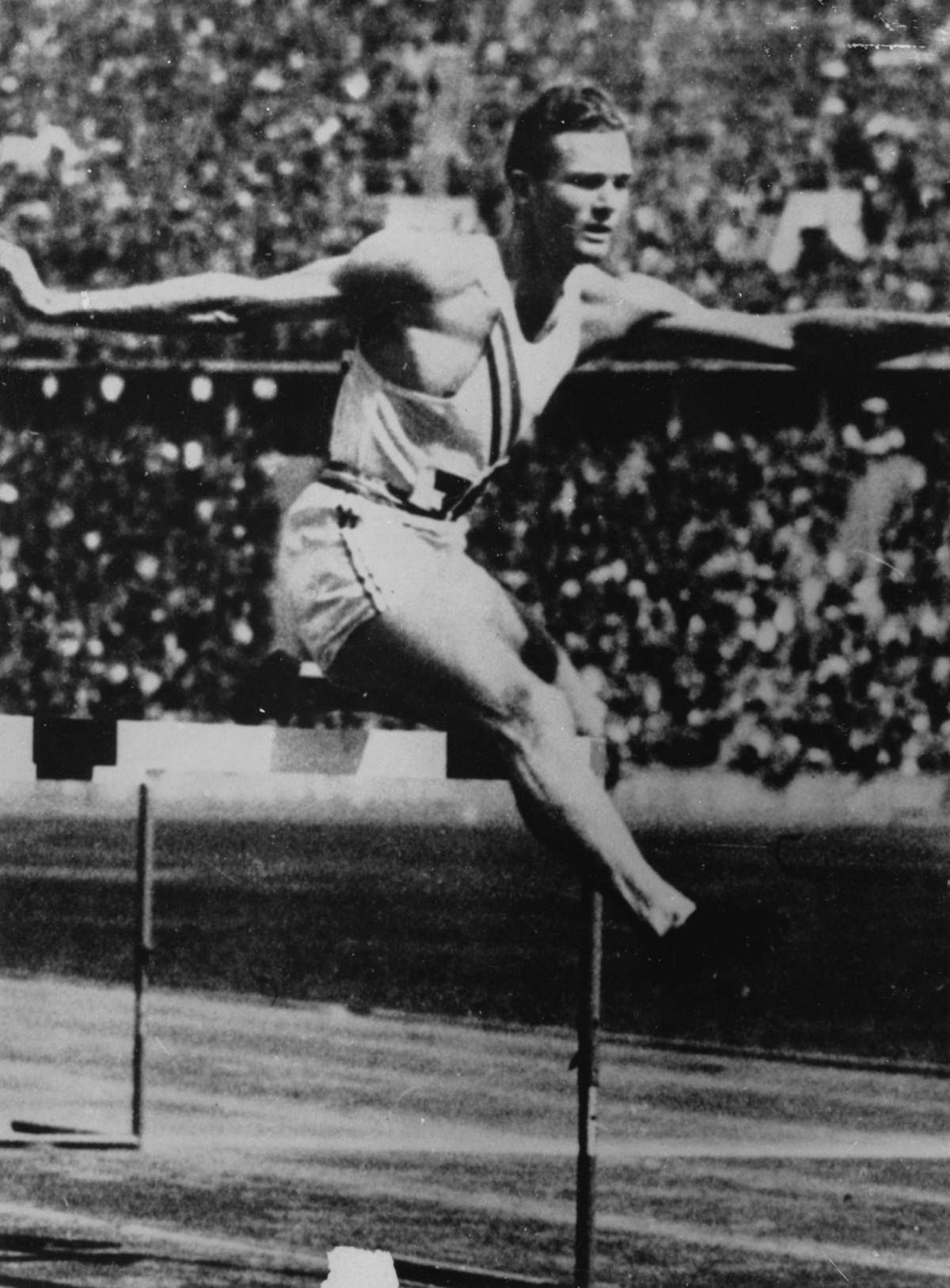
- Hardin in 1940

Medal record

Men's athletics

Representing the United States

Olympic Games
Gold medal – first place	1936 Berlin	400 m hurdles
Silver medal – second place	1932 Los Angeles	400 m hurdles

Glenn Foster "Slats" Hardin (July 1, 1910 – March 6, 1975) was an American athlete, winner of 400 m hurdles at the 1936 Summer Olympics.

Born in Derma, Mississippi, Glenn Hardin was the world's dominant 400 m hurdler in the 1930s and was equally tough in the 400 m flat race.

Hardin's rise began at the 1932 Summer Olympics, where he finished second in the 400 m hurdles in 52.0 but was given credit for a world record when the winner, Bob Tisdall from Ireland, knocked down a hurdle, an error that in those days disqualified a performance for world record consideration. Hardin lowered the record to 51.8 in the 1934 AAU championships and then bettered it to 50.6 during a meet in Stockholm later that year. That record would stand for the next nineteen years.

Hardin was unbeatable between the 1932 and 1936 Olympics, winning the AAU title in 1933, 1934 and 1936 in 400 m hurdles and NCAA championships title in 1933 and 1934 in 440 yd (400 m) hurdles. Hardin finished his career at the Berlin Olympics, beating John Loaring from Canada by 0.3 seconds.

Hardin was a member of the LSU Tigers outdoor track and field team that won the school's first ever NCAA Championship in 1933. He won two NCAA individual titles during the meet.

Hardin was inducted into the USTFCCCA Collegiate Athlete Hall of Fame in 2024.
