= Athletics at the 1936 Summer Olympics – Men's high jump =

Men's high jump at the Games of the XI Olympiad
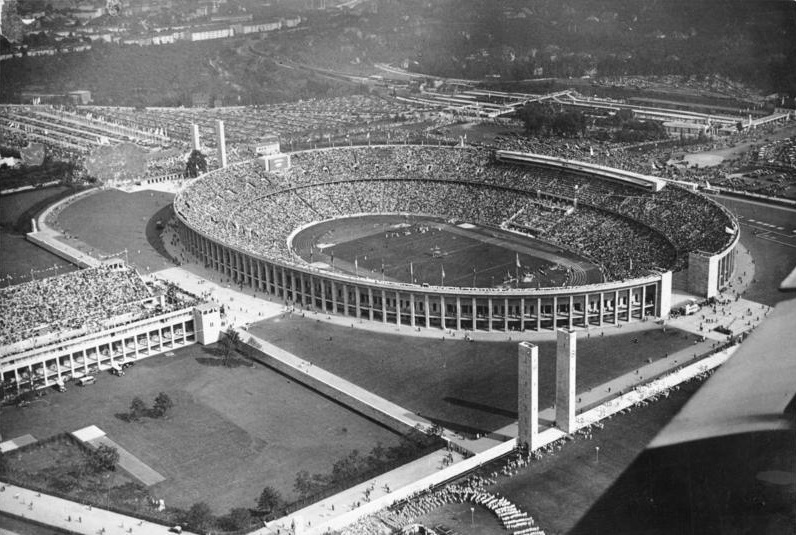
- Olympiastadion
- Venue: Olympiastadion: Berlin, Germany
- Dates: August 2, 1936
- Competitors: 40 from 23 nations
- Winning height: 2.03 OR

Medalists
1st place, gold medalist(s)		Cornelius Johnson; United States
2nd place, silver medalist(s)		Dave Albritton; United States
3rd place, bronze medalist(s)		Delos Thurber; United States

The men's high jump event was part of the track and field athletics programme at the 1936 Summer Olympics. The competition was held on August 2, 1936. Forty athletes from 24 nations competed. The maximum number of athletes per nation had been set at 3 since the 1930 Olympic Congress. The final was won by Cornelius Johnson of the United States. It was the nation's ninth victory in the men's high jump. Johnson's fellow Americans Dave Albritton and Delos Thurber took silver and bronze to complete the podium sweep, the second time (after the inaugural Games in 1896) the United States had taken all three medals in the event.

== Background ==
This was the tenth appearance of the event, which is one of 12 athletics events to have been held at every Summer Olympics. The returning jumpers from the 1932 Games were bronze medalist Simeon Toribio of the Philippines (who had also placed fourth in 1928), fourth-place finisher Cornelius Johnson of the United States, and seventh-place finisher Jerzy Pławczyk of Poland. Johnson was the slight favorite over his countryman Dave Albritton; both had jumped 2.07 metres at the U.S. trials to break the world record.

Australia, Austria, Brazil, the Republic of China, Denmark, Iceland, and Yugoslavia each made their debut in the event. The United States appeared for the tenth time, having competed at each edition of the Olympic men's high jump to that point.

== Competition format ==
The competition returned to the two-round format introduced in 1912. There were two distinct rounds of jumping with results cleared between rounds. All jumpers clearing 1.85 metres in the qualifying round advanced to the final (described at the time as separate semifinals and final, though the results were not reset between them). There were jump-offs in the final to resolve ties through sixth place, though the sixth-place jump-off was cancelled "by special order".

== Records ==
These were the standing world and Olympic records (in metres) prior to the 1936 Summer Olympics.

World record	Cornelius Johnson (USA); Dave Albritton (USA)	2.07	New York, United States	12 July 1936
Olympic record	Harold Osborn (USA)	1.98	Paris, France	7 July 1924

Four men cleared the bar at 2.00 metres, besting the Olympic record: Cornelius Johnson, Dave Albritton, Delos Thurber, and Kalevi Kotkas. Johnson further improved the new record with a successful jump at 2.03 metres. He then tried for the world record, setting the bar at 2.08 metres, but could not achieve that height.

== Schedule ==
The "semifinal" was in effect just the first half of the final.

Date	Time	Round
Sunday, 2 August 1936	10:30; 15:00; 17:30	Qualifying; Semifinal; Final

== Results ==
Key

- o = Height cleared
- x = Height failed
- – = Height passed
- r = Retired
- SB = Season's best
- PB = Personal best
- NR = National record
- AR = Area record
- OR = Olympic record
- WR = World record
- WL = World lead
- NM = No mark
- DNS = Did not start
- DQ = Disqualified

=== Qualifying ===
Rank	Athlete	Nation	Height	Notes
1	Dave Albritton	United States	1.85	Q
1	Günther Gehmert	Germany	1.85	Q
1	Jerzy Pławczyk	Poland	1.85	Q
1	Kimio Yada	Japan	1.85	Q
1	Mihály Bodosi	Hungary	1.85	Q
1	Veikko Peräsalo	Finland	1.85	Q
1	Reindert Brasser	Netherlands	1.85	Q
1	Aksel Kuuse	Estonia	1.85	Q
1	Simeon Toribio	Philippines	1.85	Q
1	Poul Otto	Denmark	1.85	Q
1	Kalevi Kotkas	Finland	1.85	Q
1	Gustav Weinkötz	Germany	1.85	Q
1	Yoshiro Asakuma	Japan	1.85	Q
1	Joe Haley	Canada	1.85	Q
1	Rudolf Eggenberg	Switzerland	1.85	Q
1	Cornelius Johnson	United States	1.85	Q
1	Delos Thurber	United States	1.85	Q
1	Åke Ödmark	Sweden	1.85	Q
1	Lauri Kalima	Finland	1.85	Q
1	Jack Metcalfe	Australia	1.85	Q
1	Hiroshi Tanaka	Japan	1.85	Q
1	Edwin Thacker	South Africa	1.85	Q
23	Alfredo Mendes	Brazil	1.80	
23	Svend Aage Thomsen	Denmark	1.80	
23	Robert Kennedy	Great Britain	1.80	
23	Ícaro Mello	Brazil	1.80	
23	Jack Newman	Great Britain	1.80	
23	Gerard Carlier	Netherlands	1.80	
23	Edvard Natvig	Norway	1.80	
23	Sigurður Sigurðsson	Iceland	1.80	
23	Fritz Flachberger	Austria	1.80	
32	Stan West	Great Britain	1.70	
32	Fritz Neuruhrer	Austria	1.70	
32	Břetislav Krátký	Czechoslovakia	1.70	
32	Hans Mohr	Yugoslavia	1.70	
32	Zdeněk Sobotka	Czechoslovakia	1.70	
32	Hans Martens	Germany	1.70	
32	Konstantinos Pantazis	Greece	1.70	
32	Karol Hoffmann	Poland	1.70	
32	Wu Bixian	Republic of China	1.70	

=== Final ===
Details of the jump-off for second through fourth places are unknown. There was supposed to be a jump-off for sixth place, but it "did not take place, by special order."

Rank	Athlete	Nation	1.70	1.80	1.85	1.90	1.94	1.97	2.00	2.03	2.08	Height	Notes
1st place, gold medalist(s)	Cornelius Johnson	United States	o	o	o	o	o	o	o	o	xxx	2.03	OR
2nd place, silver medalist(s)	Dave Albritton	United States	o	xo	o	o	o	xo	xxo	xxx	—	2.00	
3rd place, bronze medalist(s)	Delos Thurber	United States	o	—	o	o	o	o	xo	xxx	—	2.00	
4	Kalevi Kotkas	Finland	—	o	—	o	xxo	o	xxo	xxx	—	2.00	
5	Kimio Yada	Japan	o	o	o	o	o	o	xxx	—		1.97	
6	Hiroshi Tanaka	Japan	o	o	o	o	o	xxx	—			1.94	
6	Yoshiro Asakuma	Japan	o	o	o	o	xo	xxx	—			1.94	
6	Lauri Kalima	Finland	o	o	o	o	xo	xxx	—			1.94	
6	Gustav Weinkötz	Germany	o	o	xo	o	xxo	xxx	—			1.94	
10	Aksel Kuuse	Estonia	o	o	o	xxo	xxx	—				1.90	
10	Günther Gehmert	Germany	—	xo	o	xxo	xxx	—				1.90	
12	Jack Metcalfe	Australia	o	o	o	xxx	—					1.85	
12	Reindert Brasser	Netherlands	o	o	o	xxx	—					1.85	
12	Åke Ödmark	Sweden	o	o	o	xxx	—					1.85	
12	Edwin Thacker	South Africa	o	o	o	xxx	—					1.85	
12	Joe Haley	Canada	—	xo	o	xxx	—					1.85	
12	Simeon Toribio	Philippines	o	xo	o	xxx	—					1.85	
12	Poul Otto	Denmark	o	xo	xo	xxx	—					1.85	
12	Veikko Peräsalo	Finland	xo	o	xxo	xxx	—					1.85	
12	Rudolf Eggenberg	Switzerland	—	o	xxo	xxx	—					1.85	
12	Mihály Bodosi	Hungary	o	o	xxo	xxx	—					1.85	
22	Jerzy Pławczyk	Poland	o	o	xxx	—						1.80	
