= Hans Martens =

German high jumper

Personal information
- Nationality: German
- Born: 30 October 1911
- Died: 6 June 1970 (aged 58)

Sport
- Sport: Athletics
- Event: High jump

Hans Martens (30 October 1911 – 6 June 1970) was a German athlete. He competed in the men's high jump at the 1936 Summer Olympics.
