= Aleksander Kreek =

Estonian shot putter

Medal record

Men's athletics

Representing Estonia

European Championships
Gold medal – first place	1938 Paris	Shot Put

Aleksander Kreek (21 July 1914 – 19 August 1977) was an Estonian track and field athlete who specialised in the shot put. He was the 1938 European champion in the shot put – one of only two Estonian men to achieve the feat, alongside Arnold Viiding. He was twice a medallist at the International University Games (1937 and 1939).

His personal best was 16.40 m (53 ft 9 1/2 in), which was an Estonian record at the time. He was a four-time national shot put champion, and also a one-time discus throw champion.

== Career ==
Born in Lihula, Lääne County, he reached international class in the mid-1930s, competing in the sport while at military school. After receiving his first international call-up in 1936, he had his first successes in the 1937 season. He won the gold medal at the 1937 International University Games, retaining the title for Estonia which Arnold Viiding had won two years previously. That year, he also won the first of his four Estonian national titles in the shot put. Kreek's best throw of 15.90 m (52 ft 1 3/4 in) was enough to rank him sixth globally that season.

Kreek threw an Estonian record mark of 16.16 m (53 ft 0 in) in Karlstad in 1938 – this made him the second-best athlete in that world that year (his highest ever ranking). In his career he would go on to break this mark twice more: in 1939 he threw 16.28 m (53 ft 4 3/4 in) before reaching a lifetime best distance of 16.40 m (53 ft 9 1/2 in) that same year. His greatest achievement occurred in this period as he represented Estonia at the 1938 European Athletics Championships in Paris and won the European title in a championship record of 15.83 m (51 ft 11 in). Again he was following on from his compatriot Arnold Viiding, who was the champion at the inaugural 1934 edition. Despite this early success, Kreek and Viiding remain the only Estonians to have won the European shot put title. For his achievement he was given the Order of the White Star (III class), in recognition of his services to Estonia through sport.

The third and final major international medal of his career was a silver medal at the 1939 International University Games. Kreek gave a strong performance, reaching 16.26 m (53 ft 4 in), but was outdone by Germany's Gerhard Stöck, who was the reigning Olympic javelin throw champion. Kreek also won the Estonian discus throw title in 1939.

Kreek made his final international appearances for Estonia in 1940 and also matched his Estonian record with another throw of 16.40 m (53 ft 9 1/2 in) (placing him fourth among shot putters for the season). He continued to compete nationally after that, winning his remaining national shot put titles, but his performance declined and he did not pass sixteen metres after 1940.

Away from the track, Kreek worked for Estonia's National Bureau of Statistics from 1936 to 1938, the Bank of Estonia from 1938 to 1940, then as a police officer for the occupation forces of Nazi Germany in the mid-1940s. He left Estonia for Sweden as a refugee of the 1944 Soviet invasion of Estonia. Kreek later emigrated to Canada in the early 1950s and settled down to family life there. He died in Toronto in 1977. His grandson, Adam Kreek, became an international class rower for Canada and was a gold medallist at the 2008 Summer Olympics.
