= Joseph H. Patterson =

Joseph Heste Patterson (August 15, 1912 – May 23, 1939) was an American naval officer who also competed at the 1936 Summer Olympics. He went by "Pat" Patterson while in the Navy.

== Early life ==
A native of Oklahoma City, Oklahoma, Patterson graduated from the United States Naval Academy in 1936. While at the Naval Academy, he competed for the track team. That same year, he finished second in the 400 m hurdles at the US Olympic trials for the 1936 Games in Berlin. At the Berlin Games, he finished fourth in 400 m hurdles event, losing out on the bronze medal to Miguel White of the Philippines by 0.2 seconds.

He married Elizabeth "Betty" Greenlee in 1938.

== Naval career ==
After the Olympics, Patterson served aboard the USS Louisville cruiser as an ensign. He would serve from May 1936 to May 1938. After transferring to the submarine fleet, Patterson completed training at the submarine school in New London, Connecticut before being assigned to the USS Squalus in October 1938.

Patterson lost his life aboard the Squalus on May 23, 1939 when the main induction valve failed to close off the Isles of Shoals. This caused the aft torpedo room, both engine rooms, and the crew's quarters to be flooded. He was one of 26 men to drown immediately, and the only officer to die in the accident. The rest of the surviving crew was rescued by the USS Falcon led by Lieutenant Commander Charles "Swede" Momsen and the Squalus was refloated where Patterson and his dead crewmates were recovered.

Patterson is buried in Arlington National Cemetery. He was posthumously promoted to Lieutenant (junior grade).
