= Friedrich Issak =

Estonian javelin thrower and journalist

Medal record

Men's athletics

Representing Estonia

International University Games
Gold medal – first place	1937 Paris	Javelin throw
Bronze medal – third place	1939 Vienna	Javelin throw

Friedrich Issak (20 November 1915, Petrograd – 11 May 1991) was an Estonian sportsman and journalist. As a javelin thrower, he won gold and bronze medals at the International University Games and was national champion of Estonia and later the Soviet Union. In addition, he played basketball and volleyball, winning national championship medals in both. He later became editor-in-chief of the culture magazine Kultuur ja Elu.

== Sports career ==
At the 1937 International University Games in Paris Issak won gold in the javelin with a throw of 70.25 m, a meeting record that was only broken twenty years later. His best throw that year, 70.56 m, placed him sixth on the annual world list. Issak placed fifth at the 1938 European Championships, also in Paris, and recorded his personal best (72.07 m) in Tartu in July 1939. At that year's International University Games in Vienna he won the bronze medal with 66.79 m.

He was Estonian champion in the javelin in 1940, 1946 and 1947 and Soviet champion in 1943, 1944 and 1947. Additionally, he was Estonian basketball champion three times from 1938 to 1940 with Tartu EASK. He also won national championship medals in volleyball.

== Outside sports ==
During World War II Issak served in the Red Army and the destruction battalions. In 1944 he became editor of the sports magazine Kehakultuur, a post he held until 1951. From 1958 to 1978 he worked for the culture magazine Kultuur ja Elu, eventually becoming its editor-in-chief. His memoir Nood rohtunud rajad was published in 1988.
