= Willi Kürten =

German hurdler

Personal information
- Nationality: German
- Born: 4 April 1908 Hanover, Germany
- Died: 18 July 1944 (aged 36) Ukraine

Sport
- Sport: Track and field
- Event: 400 metres hurdles

Willi Kürten (4 April 1908 – 18 July 1944) was a German hurdler. He competed in the men's 400 metres hurdles at the 1936 Summer Olympics. He was killed in action during World War II.
