= Giuseppe Russo (athlete) =

Italian hurdler

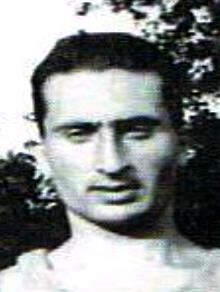

Personal information
- National team: Italy: 5 caps (1934-1947)
- Born: 13 March 1913 Palermo, Italy
- Died: July 5, 2010 (aged 97) Rome, Italy

Sport
- Sport: Athletics
- Event: Hurdling
- Club: Ginnastica Roma (1927-1933); GUF Roma (1934-1944); U.S. Milanese (1945-1947)

Achievements and titles
- Personal bests: 110 m hs: 15.0 (1947); 400 m hs: 54.7 (1939)

Giuseppe "Peppino" Russo (13 March 1913 - 5 July 2010) was an Italian hurdler and sport coach, he was 7th in the 400 m hs at the 1938 European Athletics Championships.

== Biography ==
Federal technician from 1947 to 1968, he participated as athletic coach of the sprinting, in six Olympics from London 1948 to Mexico City 1968. Among the athletes he trained there was Livio Berruti, gold medal in the 200 m at the Olympics in Rome 1960.

== Achievements ==
Year	Competition	Venue	Rank	Event	Time	Notes
1938	European Championships	(France) Paris	7th	400 m hs	54.8	

== See also ==
- Italy at the 1938 European Athletics Championships
