= Georg Glaw =

German athlete

Personal information
- Nationality: German
- Born: 16 May 1913 Halle, German Empire
- Died: 14 June 1940 (aged 27) Barst, France

Sport
- Sport: Athletics
- Event: 400 m

Georg Glaw (16 May 1913 – 14 June 1940) was a German athlete who specialized in the 400 metres hurdles.

In 1934, Glaw became regional champion in both hurdle distances. At the 1938 European Athletics Championships in Paris, he finished fourth. After a third place in 1937 over 110 metres hurdles, he managed to finish as German champion in 400 metres at the 1938 national championships. Glaw started for VfL 96 Halle.

Glaw served as a gefreiter in the German Army during the Second World War. He was killed in action in France on 14 June 1940 and is buried in Niederbronn-les-Bains.
