= Zdeněk Sobotka =

Czech high jumper

Personal information
- Nationality: Czechoslovak
- Born: 17 January 1917 Benátky nad Jizerou, Austria-Hungary
- Died: 20 January 2001 (aged 84)

Sport
- Sport: Athletics
- Event: High jump

Zdeněk Sobotka (17 January 1917 – 20 January 2001) was a Czechoslovak athlete. He competed in the men's high jump at the 1936 Summer Olympics.
