= Gerard Carlier =

Dutch high jumper

Personal information
- Nationality: Dutch
- Born: 23 February 1917
- Died: 1 February 1995 (aged 77)

Sport
- Sport: Athletics
- Event: High jump

Gerard Carlier (23 February 1917 – 1 February 1995) was a Dutch athlete. He competed in the men's high jump at the 1936 Summer Olympics.
