= Fritz Neuruhrer =

Austrian high jumper

Personal information
- Nationality: Austrian
- Born: 17 July 1910
- Died: 20 January 1977 (aged 66)

Sport
- Sport: Athletics
- Event: High jump

Fritz Neuruhrer (17 July 1910 – 20 January 1977) was an Austrian athlete. He competed in the men's high jump at the 1936 Summer Olympics.
