= Wu Bixian =

Chinese high jumper

Personal information
- Nationality: Chinese
- Born: 7 December 1913 Tianjin, China

Sport
- Sport: Athletics
- Event: High jump

Wu Bixian (born 7 December 1913, date of death unknown) was a Chinese athlete. He competed in the men's high jump at the 1936 Summer Olympics.
