= Walter Fritsch =

Chilean hurdler

Personal information
- Nationality: Chilean
- Born: 11 December 1911
- Died: 18 July 2005 (aged 93)

Sport
- Sport: Track and field
- Event: 400 metres hurdles

Walter Fritsch (11 December 1911 – 18 July 2005) was a Chilean hurdler. He competed in the men's 400 metres hurdles at the 1936 Summer Olympics.
