= Yada =

Yada (written: 矢田 or 谷田) is a Japanese surname. Notable people with the surname include:

- Akiko Yada (矢田 亜希子, born 1978), Japanese actress
- Asahi Yada (矢田 旭, born 1991), Japanese footballer
- Kimio Yada (矢田 喜美雄, 1913–1990), Japanese high jumper
- Kōji Yada (矢田 耕司, 1933–2014), Japanese voice actor
- Lena Yada (born 1978), Japanese-American model, actress, and surfer
- Minoru Yada (矢田 稔, born 1931), Japanese voice actor
- Shizuo Yada (矢田 静雄, born 1948), Japanese sport wrestler
- Tatsuo Yada (矢田 立郎, born 1940), mayor of Kobe, Japan
- Yusuke Yada (谷田 悠介, born 1983), Japanese footballer

== Fictional characters ==
- Tōka Yada (矢田 桃花), a character in the Assassination Classroom anime and manga

== See also ==
- "The Yada Yada", an episode of Seinfeld
