= József Sir =

Hungarian sprinter

Personal information
- Nationality: Hungarian
- Born: 28 April 1912 Budapest, Hungary
- Died: 22 September 1996 (aged 84) Budapest, Hungary
- Height: 178 cm (5 ft 10 in)
- Weight: 73 kg (161 lb)

Sport
- Sport: Athletics
- Event: Sprints
- Club: BBTE, Budapest
Medal record
Men's athletics
Representing Hungary
European Championships
Silver medal – second place	1934 Turin	200 m
Silver medal – second place	1934 Turin	4×100 m
Bronze medal – third place	1934 Turin	100 m
International University Games
Gold medal – first place	1935 Budapest	100 m
Gold medal – first place	1935 Budapest	200 m
Gold medal – first place	1935 Budapest	4×100 m relay
Gold medal – first place	1939 Vienna	100 m
Silver medal – second place	1939 Vienna	200 m
Bronze medal – third place	1939 Vienna	4×100 m relay
Bronze medal – third place	1939 Vienna	10×200 m relay

József Ágoston Sir (born Schier; 28 April 1912 – 22 September 1996) was a Hungarian sprinter. He won three medals at the 1934 European Championships and was a four-time International University Games gold medallist.

== Career ==
Sir won three medals, two silvers and a bronze, at the inaugural European Championships in Turin in 1934. He won silver in the 200 metres behind Chris Berger of the Netherlands, with both clocking 21.5. In the 100 metres he ran 10.7 and placed third behind Berger (10.6) and Germany's Erich Borchmeyer. He won his third medal in the 4 × 100 metres relay with the Hungarian team, which ran 41.4 and lost only to Germany.

Sir won three gold medals at the 1935 International University Games in Budapest, running 10.8 and 21.6 for 100 and 200 metres and 41.6 with the Hungarian relay team. At the 1936 Summer Olympics he advanced to the semi-finals in the 100 metres; he placed last in his semi-final and was eliminated. In the 200 metres he went out in the quarterfinals, and the Hungarian relay team failed to qualify for the final.

Sir won four more medals at the International University Games in 1939. There were two competing meetings that year, in Monte Carlo and Vienna; Sir participated in the Vienna meet, winning gold in the 100 metres (10.7), silver in the 200 metres (21.9) and bronze with the 4 × 100 metres relay team. He won another bronze in the 10 × 200 metres relay, a one-off event.

Sir was Hungarian champion at both 100 and 200 metres in 1934, 1935 and 1939. In addition, in 1934 he won the AAA Championships at 100 yards in 9.9. His best time for 100 metres was 10.4, which he ran in Berlin on 1 July 1934; it was a Hungarian record, and remained so for more than thirty years.

Sir served in the IAAF Council from 1964 to 1984. He proposed the IAAF Technical Aid Programme, which sought to develop the sport, and became its first director when it was approved.

== Competition record ==
Year	Competition	Venue	Position	Event	Notes
Representing Hungary
1934	European Championships	Turin, Italy	3rd	100 m	10.7
1934	European Championships	Turin, Italy	2nd	200 m	21.5
