= Teodoro Malasig =

Filipino hurdler

Personal information
- Nationality: Filipino
- Born: April 10, 1912
- Died: November 14, 1989 (aged 77) San Jose del Monte, Bulacan, Philippines

Sport
- Sport: Track and field
- Event: 400 metres hurdles

Teodoro P. Malasig (April 10, 1912 – November 14, 1989) was a Filipino hurdler. He competed in the men's 400 metres hurdles at the 1936 Summer Olympics.

Malasig first competed as an 18-year-old at the 1930 Far Eastern Championship Games He studied at the College of Agriculture at the University of the Philippines and joined the Upsilon Sigma Phi fraternity. During this time, Malasig represented his university as a quarter miler and in basketball. After World War II, he became an official of the Agricultural Promotion Centre (APC).
