= Poul Otto =

Danish high jumper

Personal information
- Nationality: Danish
- Born: 19 December 1913
- Died: 26 December 2003 (aged 90)

Sport
- Sport: Athletics
- Event: High jump

Poul Otto (19 December 1913 –26 December 2003) was a Danish athlete. He competed in the men's high jump at the 1936 Summer Olympics.
