= Russ Watson =

Personal information
- Full name: Russell Henry Watson
- Born: 26 December 1892; Moonee Ponds, Victoria
- Died: 15 November 1941 (aged 48); East Melbourne, Victoria
- Original team: Melbourne Grammar School

Playing career^{1}
Years	Club	Games (Goals)
1910	St Kilda	2 (1)
- ^{1} Playing statistics correct to the end of 1910.

Russell Henry Watson (26 December 1892 – 15 November 1941) was an Australian amateur middle distance champion, an Australian rules footballer, who played with St Kilda in the Victorian Football League (VFL), and a District Cricketer with the St Kilda Cricket Club (where he also served as its Vice-President).

== Family ==
The son of Thomas Watson (1866-1925), and Flora Henrietta Watson (1874-1950), née Dowell, Russell Henry Watson was born at Moonee Ponds on 26 December 1892. He was the elder brother of Olympic and Empire Games athlete Alfred Joseph Watson (1907-1992). He married Freda Mildred Akhurst (1897-1979) on 20 August 1918. He died in East Melbourne on 15 November 1941.

== Athlete ==
"One of the greatest all-round athletes Australia has ever produced", Watson held titles in the mile, half-mile, and 440 hurdles.

== Military service ==
He served in the Firat AIF in the 6th Australian Field Ambulance.
