= Louis Gailliard =

French hurdler

Personal information
- Full name: Louis Henri Pierre Gailliard
- Nationality: French
- Born: 13 September 1912 Saint-Quentin-Fallavier, France
- Died: 10 June 1996 (aged 83) La Tronche, France

Sport
- Sport: Track and field
- Event: 400 metres hurdles

Louis Gailliard (13 September 1912 – 10 June 1996) was a French hurdler. He competed in the men's 400 metres hurdles at the 1936 Summer Olympics.
