= Tokio Fukuda =

Japanese hurdler

Personal information
- Nationality: Japanese
- Born: 10 February 1915
- Died: 6 January 2001 (aged 85)

Sport
- Sport: Track and field
- Event: 400 metres hurdles

Tokio Fukuda (福田 時雄, Fukuda Tokio; 10 February 1915 – 6 January 2001) was a Japanese hurdler. He competed in the men's 400 metres hurdles at the 1936 Summer Olympics.
