= August Banščak =

Yugoslav hurdler

Personal information
- Nationality: Yugoslav
- Born: 10 October 1911 Pančevo, Austria-Hungary

Sport
- Sport: Track and field
- Event: 400 metres hurdles

August Banščak (born 10 October 1911, date of death unknown) was a Yugoslav hurdler. He competed in the men's 400 metres hurdles at the 1936 Summer Olympics.
