= James Worrall =

Canadian lawyer and athlete (1914–2011)

Personal information
- Born: June 23, 1914 Bury, Lancashire, England
- Died: October 9, 2011 (aged 97) Toronto, Ontario
Medal record
Men's Athletics
Representing Canada
British Empire Games
Silver medal – second place	1934 London	120 yd hurdles

James Worrall, OC (June 23, 1914 – October 9, 2011) was a Canadian lawyer, Olympic track and field athlete, and sports administrator.

Born in Bury, Lancashire, England, Worrall emigrated to Montreal, Quebec in 1922.

He received a Bachelor of Science degree from McGill University in 1935, then received his law degree from Osgoode Hall Law School in Toronto, Ontario, going on to practice law in Toronto.

A track and field athlete, Worrall was the Canadian team flag bearer at the 1936 Summer Olympics opening ceremonies in Berlin, Germany, competing in both hurdling events.

In the 110 metre hurdles event as well as in the 400 metre hurdles competition he was eliminated in the first round.

Previously, at the 1934 British Empire Games held in London, he won the silver medal in the 120 yards hurdles contest. In the quarter mile hurdles event (440 yards) he finished fourth.

Following his competitive retirement, he moved into sports administration within the Olympic movement. From 1964 to 1968, Worrall was the president of the Canadian Olympic Committee and he rose to be a member of the International Olympic Committee – a position he held from 1967 to 1989.

In 1989, he was made an Honorary Member of the International Olympic Committee. Worrall was a member of the Board of Directors of the organizing committees for the 1976 Summer Olympics and the 1988 Winter Olympics.

In 1976, Worrall was made an Officer of the Order of Canada.

In 1987, he was inducted into Canada's Sports Hall of Fame. In 1991, he was inducted into the Olympic Hall of Fame. In 1998, he was inducted to the McGill University Sports Hall of Fame.

Canadian Red Ensign carried by James Worrall at the 1936 Olympic Games

In July 2009 Worrall was noted as Canada's second oldest living Olympian, and he became the oldest upon the death of Marjory Saunders in November 2010.
