= Kim Won-kwon =

South Korean athlete (born 1918)

- Hangul: 김원권
- Hanja: 金源權
- RR: Gim Wongwon
- MR: Kim Wŏn'gwŏn

Kim Won-kwon
Medal record

Men's athletics

Representing Japan

International University Games
Gold medal – first place	1939 Vienna	Triple jump

Kim Won-kwon (Korean: 김원권; born 13 December 1918, date of death unknown), also romanized as Kim Won-gwon, was a South Korean long jumper and triple jumper. Kim was the world's leading triple jumper during the early 1940s and competed in the 1948 Summer Olympics.

== Biography ==
Like other Korean athletes of the time, Kim represented Japan while it ruled Korea, winning gold in men's triple jump at the 1939 Vienna International University Games with a jump of 15.37 m. He topped the triple jump world list in 1938 (15.63 m), 1940 (15.68 m), 1941 (15.82 m), 1942 (15.64 m) and 1943 (15.86 m); the last of these marks was his personal best and remained the South Korean record for more than forty years. In 1939 it was reported that Kim had jumped 16.25 m in training, which would have been a world record if duplicated in an official meeting.

Kim was also a good long jumper, and would have been a leading favorite in both events at the 1940 Summer Olympics if they had not been cancelled due to World War II. Kim represented South Korea at the 1948 Olympics, but by then he had lost his best shape; he placed 18th in the long jump and 12th in the triple jump.

Kim is deceased.
