= Günther Gehmert =

German high jumper (1913–1940)

Personal information
- Nationality: German
- Born: 9 February 1913 Berlin, German Empire
- Died: 13 June 1940 (aged 27) Montaigu, France

Sport
- Sport: Athletics
- Event: High jump

Günther Gehmert (9 February 1913 – 13 June 1940) was a German athlete. He competed in the men's high jump at the 1936 Summer Olympics. He was killed in action during World War II.

== Personal life ==
Gehmert served in the German Army during the Second World War. He died of wounds in France on 13 June 1940.
