= Dale Schofield =

American hurdler (1915–2006)

Personal information
- Born: Melbourne Dale Schofield; April 14, 1915 Salt Lake City, Utah, US
- Died: December 9, 2006 (aged 91) Portland, Oregon, US
- Height: 6 ft 0 in (1.83 m)
- Weight: 175 lb (79 kg)

Sport
- Country: United States
- Sport: Track and field
- Event: 400 metres hurdles
- University team: Brigham Young University Cougars

Achievements and titles
- Personal bests: 120-y hurdles – 14.9 (1935); 400-m hurdles – 51.7 (1936)
Medal record
Representing the United States
Olympic Games

Dale Schofield

Military service
- Allegiance: United States
- Branch/service: United States Navy
- Years of service: 1941–1945
- Rank: Lieutenant

Melbourne Dale Schofield (April 14, 1915 – December 9, 2006) was an American hurdler. He competed in the men's 400 metres hurdles at the 1936 Summer Olympics.

== University years ==
Schofield was the captain of the BYU Cougars track team, that won the conference championship in 1936.

After graduating from BYU with a Bachelor's Degree, Schofield got a Master's Degree in Education from the University of Southern California.

== Olympics ==
Schofield placed eighth in the 400-meter hurdles at the 1936 Olympic Games in Berlin, Germany; where he was a teammate of Jesse Owens for Team USA.

== Military service ==
Schofield served as a lieutenant in the Navy and was stationed in the Pacific during World War II.

== Career ==
After his running career, Schofield became a grade school principal in the Portland, Oregon, area; including 4 years at Sabin Grade School.

== Later years/Legacy ==
Schofield became an Honoree (was inducted) in to the Utah Sports Hall of Fame in 1977.

== Personal life ==
Schofield was a member of the Church of Jesus Christ of Latter-day Saints.
