= Delos Thurber =

American high jumper

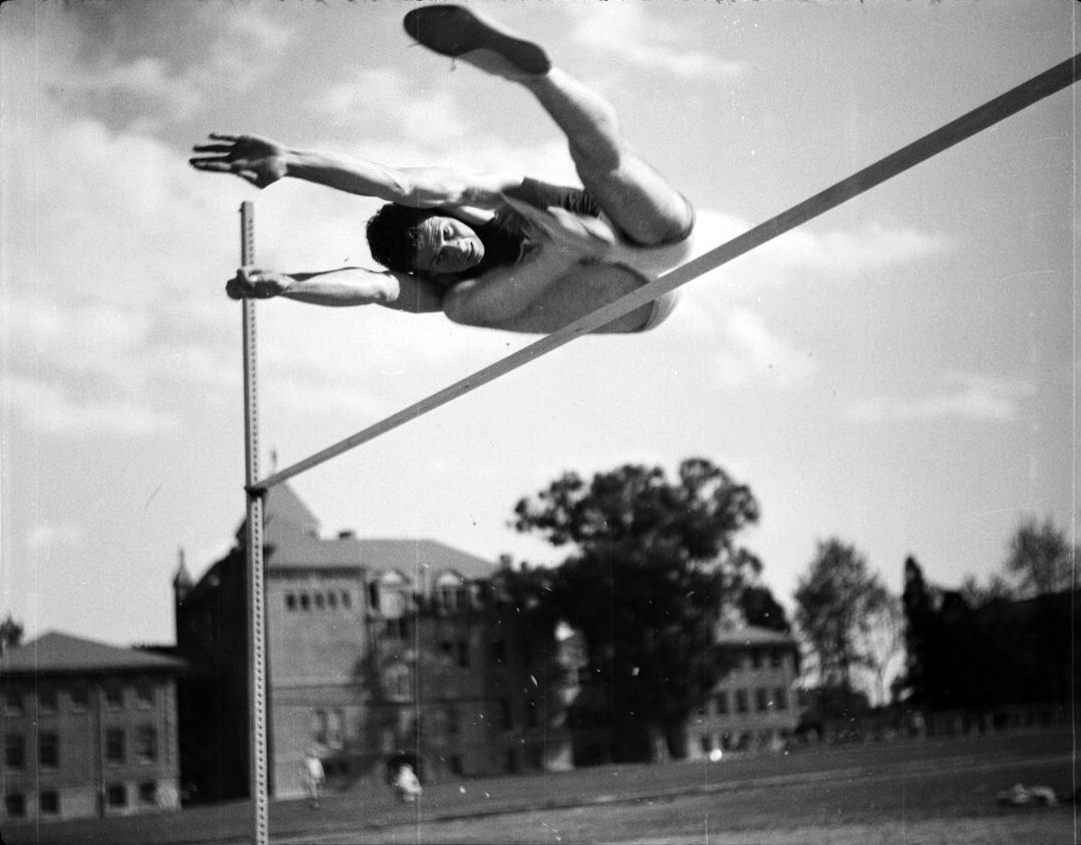
- Thurber in 1936

Medal record

Men's athletics

Representing the United States
Bronze medal – third place	1936 Berlin	High jump

Delos Packard Thurber (November 23, 1916, in Los Angeles, California – May 12, 1987, in San Diego, California) was an American athlete who competed mainly in the high jump. He graduated from the University of Southern California.

He competed for the United States in the 1936 Summer Olympics held in Berlin, then part of Nazi Germany, in the high jump where he won the bronze medal.

During World War II Thurber was a pilot, serving in the Pacific Theater of Operations. After the war he stayed on in the Philippines as one of the founders of what would become Philippine Airlines. He eventually settled in San Diego and continued to fly DC-3 part-time for a non-sked operation until his 60th birthday forced his retirement from that.
