= Kultuur ja Elu =

Estonian magazine

- Categories: Cultural magazine
- Publisher: Perioodika
- Founded: 1958; 67 years ago
- Country: Estonia
- Based in: Tallinn
- Language: Estonian
- ISSN: 0134-5605
- OCLC: 486108978

Kultuur ja Elu (meaning "Culture and Life" in English) is an Estonian magazine dedicated to culture.

== History and profile ==
Kultuur ja Elu has been issued since 1958.

In the 21st century, the journal developed into an almost exclusively military history publication, dealing primarily with the fate of Estonian soldiers in World War II. At times she was suspected of having a fondness for National Socialism.

During the Soviet times the magazine was a publication of the Ministry of Culture of Estonian SSR and Estonian SSR Council of Trade Unions. Between 1858 and 1958 its name was Kultuuritöötaja (meaning Worker of Culture in English). Its content was related to "workers of culture", i.e., artists, actors, writers, critics, ets. It also published short literary works and has a section of photography.

Since the 1990s, after re-establishing independence by Estonia, its main topics has included crimes of the Soviet regime and struggle for freedom against Communism and Soviet state. Following the privatization of the press the magazine began to be published by Perioodika.

== Editors-in-chief ==
- Friedrich Issak
- Sirje Endre (1984–1993)
- Jüri Estam (in the mid-1990s)
- Andres Herkel (1991–1992, editor-in-chief of the supplement Eesti Elu (meaning "Estonian Life" in English))
- Tea Kurvits (since 2009)
