= Ioannis Skiadas =

Greek hurdler (1913–1944)

Personal information
- Nationality: Greek
- Born: 23 March 1913
- Died: 7 September 1944 (aged 31)

Sport
- Sport: Track and field
- Event: 110 metres hurdles

Ioannis Skiadas (23 March 1913 – 7 September 1944) was a Greek hurdler. He competed in the men's 110 metres hurdles at the 1936 Summer Olympics.

== Sources ==
- Evangelos Andreou: "The star of champion shone...The Balkan champion of the interwar period, Giannis Skiadas” Ed. EUARCE 2011 (Ευάγγελος Ανδρέου, , EUARCE 2011 ISBN 978-960-99566-0-4)
