= Fritz Flachberger (athlete) =

Austrian high jumper

Personal information
- Nationality: Austrian
- Born: 18 February 1912 Salzburg, Austria-Hungary
- Died: 29 July 1992 (aged 80) Salzburg, Austria

Sport
- Sport: Athletics
- Event: High jump

Fritz Flachberger (18 February 1912 – 29 July 1992) was an Austrian athlete. He competed in the men's high jump at the 1936 Summer Olympics.
