= Miguel White =

Filipino track and field athlete

Personal information
- Full name: Miguel Solano White
- Nationality: Philippines
- Born: October 9, 1909 Legazpi, Albay, Philippine Islands
- Died: August 30, 1942 (aged 32) Philippine Commonwealth
- Height: 5 ft 11 in (180 cm)
- Weight: 150 lb (68 kg)

Sport
- Country: Philippines
- Event: 400 metre hurdles
Medal record
Men's athletics
Representing the Philippines
Olympic Games
Bronze medal – third place	1936 Berlin	400 m hurdles
Far Eastern Championship Games
Gold medal – first place	1934 Manila	400 m hurdles
Bronze medal – third place	1930 Tokyo	400 m

Miguel Solano White (October 9, 1909 – August 30, 1942) was a Filipino track and field athlete of American descent who competed for the Philippines in the 400 metre hurdles at the 1936 Summer Olympics held in Berlin, Germany, winning a bronze medal in the process.

White was from Legazpi, Albay. He was killed in military action during the Japanese invasion of the Philippines. At the time of his death, White was a lieutenant assigned to the 51st Division. Before World War II, White was a Philippine scout.
