= Emilio Mori =

Italian hurdler

Personal information
- Nationality: Italian
- Born: 20 June 1908 Monsummano
- Died: 5 June 1998 (aged 89)

Sport
- Country: Italy
- Sport: Athletics
- Event: 400 metres hurdles

Achievements and titles
- Personal best: 400 m js: 54.5 (1936)

Emilio Mori (20 June 1908 – 5 June 1998) was an Italian hurdler who competed at the 1936 Summer Olympics.
