= Umberto Ridi =

Italian hurdler

Personal information
- Nationality: Italian
- Born: 17 August 1913 Livorno
- Died: 23 October 1981 (aged 68)

Sport
- Country: Italy
- Sport: Athletics
- Event: 400 metres hurdles

Umberto Ridi (17 August 1913 – 23 October 1981) was an Italian hurdler who competed at the 1936 Summer Olympics.
