= Chang Hsing-hsien =

Taiwanese athlete

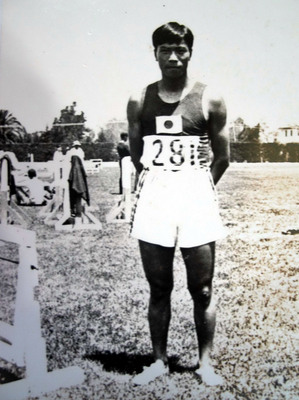

Personal information
- Born: 2 October 1910; Taichū, Japanese Taiwan
- Died: 14 March 1989 (aged 78); Taipei, Taiwan

Sport
- Sport: Athletics
- Event(s): 400 m hurdles; 400 m

Chang Hsing-hsien (Chinese: 張星賢; pinyin: Zhāng Xīngxián; 2 October 1910 – 14 March 1989) was the first Taiwanese athlete to participate in the Olympic Games.

== Early life and Olympics ==
He was born in Tatsui, Taichū Prefecture (now Longjing, Taichung City), Taiwan. He competed under the Japanese name Seiken Cho, as Taiwan was part of the Japanese Empire at the time. In 1925, Chang was admitted into Taichu Commercial School. In 1929, he broke the Japanese national middle school record (including colonies) in triple jump, qualifying for the Meiji Shrine Games.

He represented Japan at the 1932 and 1936 Summer Olympics.

== Later career ==
In 1948, Chang became one of the founding players of the Taiwan Cooperative Bank baseball team.
