= Kimio Yada =

Japanese high jumper

Personal information
- Nationality: Japanese
- Born: 17 September 1913 Yatsushiro, Fuefuki, Japan
- Died: 4 December 1990 (aged 77)

Sport
- Sport: Athletics
- Event: High jump

Kimio Yada (矢田 喜美雄, Yada Kimio; 17 September 1913 – 4 December 1990) was a Japanese track and field athlete. He competed in the men's high jump at the 1936 Summer Olympics. He later became a reporter for the Asahi Shimbun newspaper, and was especially noted for his reporting on the Shimoyama incident.
