= Yoshiro Asakuma =

Japanese high jumper

Personal information
- Nationality: Japanese
- Born: 7 January 1914
- Died: 22 December 2008 (aged 94)

Sport
- Sport: Athletics
- Event: High jump

Yoshiro Asakuma (朝隈 善郎, Asakuma Yoshirō; 7 January 1914 – 22 December 2008) was a Japanese athlete. He competed in the men's high jump at the 1936 Summer Olympics.
