= Frank Rushton (athlete) =

South African sprinter

Personal information
- Nationality: South African
- Born: 19 April 1909

Sport
- Sport: Sprinting
- Event: 4 × 400 metres relay

Frank Rushton (born 19 April 1909, date of death unknown) was a South African sprinter. He competed in the men's 4 × 400 metres relay at the 1936 Summer Olympics.
