= Luigi Facelli =

Italian hurdler (1898–1991)

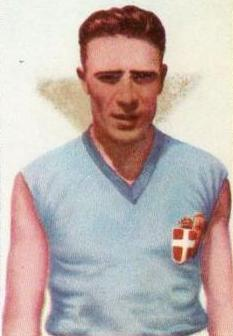

Personal information
- Nationality: Italian
- Born: 10 May 1898 Acqui Terme, Italy
- Died: 4 May 1991 (aged 92) Milan, Italy
- Height: 1.75 m (5 ft 9 in)
- Weight: 70 kg (154 lb)

Sport
- Country: Italy
- Sport: Athletics
- Event: Hurdles
- Club: SG Gallaratese; GSOM Milanolano; SS Ambrosiana

Achievements and titles
- Personal bests: 110 m hs: 15.0 (1930); 400 m hs: 52.4 (1929); 400 m: 48.1 (1931)
Medal record
AAA Championships
Gold medal – first place	1929 London	440 yards hurdles
Gold medal – first place	1931 London	440 yards hurdles
Gold medal – first place	1933 London	440 yards hurdles
Silver medal – second place	1930 London	440 yards hurdles
Bronze medal – third place	1927 London	440 yards hurdles

Luigi Facelli (10 May 1898 – 4 May 1991) was an Italian hurdler. He was born in Acqui Terme, in Piedmont, and died in Milan at the age of 92. He was one of Italy's greatest hurdlers. He was particularly known for rivalry with the British champion David Burghley in the 1920s and 1930s.

== Biography ==
=== Olympic appearances ===
Luigi Facelli participated at four Summer Olympics (1924, 1928, 1932, 1936). He finished 8th at the 1924 Summer Olympics in the 4 × 400 metres relay, 6th at the 1928 Summer Olympics in the 400 metres hurdles and 5th and 6th at the 1932 Summer Olympics respectively in the 400 metres hurdles and in the 4 × 400 metres relay. He had 30 caps in national team from 1924 to 1936.

=== Facelli-Burghley rivalry ===
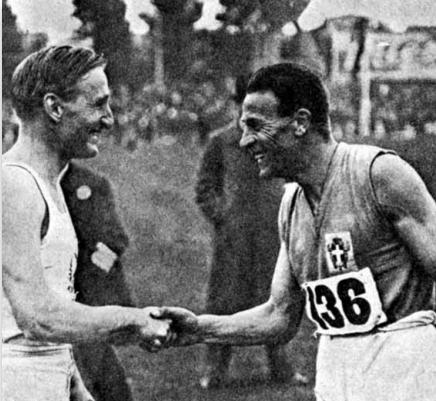
Lord Burghley (left) shakes hands with his Italian rival Facelli

During his rivalry with David Cecil, 6th Marquess of Exeter (Lord David Burghley), won 6 of the 11 contests. Because of the noble origins of Burghley their epic was renamed "The Prince and the Pauper." As part of the AAA Championships (which were considered a kind of European Athletics Championships at the time) he won three of the five contests against Burghley, winning the title at the 1929 AAA Championships, 1931 AAA Championships and the 1933 AAA Championships.

Despite their different walks of life, Lord Burghley considered Facelli a friend for years. Burghley invited him to the opening ceremony for the 1948 Summer Olympics in London. When Facelli received the letter he passed it to a friend to translate. However, the friend was unable to translate the whole later and the invitation was missed. Burghley also explained in the letter that Facelli would find a plane ticket to London at the British Consulate in Milan and also arranged accommodation for him London - but all this was "lost in translation".

=== European record ===
Facelli set a European record in the 400 metres hurdles with the time of 52.4, set in Bologna, Italy, on 6 October 1929. He was holder of the record till 9 July 1939.

=== Post athletics career ===
In honour of his sporting successes, the Italian government assigned to him an annual sum following a decision by the Council of Ministers (Legge Bacchelli). In 1988, on the occasion of his ninetieth birthday, the Italian designer Ottavio Missoni gave a party in his honor. Facelli resided in Corsico, and died in a clinic in Milan in 1991 at the age of 93 years.

== Achievements ==
Year	Competition	Venue	Position	Event	Performance	Note
1924	Olympic Games	(France) Paris	8th	4 × 400 m relay	3:28.0	
1928	Olympic Games	(Netherlands) Amsterdam	6th	400 m hs	55.8	
1928	Olympic Games	(Netherlands) Amsterdam	Heat	4 × 400 m relay	3.17.8	
1932	Olympic Games	(United States) Los Angeles	5th	400 m hs	53.0	
1932	Olympic Games	(United States) Los Angeles	6th	4 × 400 m relay	3:17.8	
1934	European Championships	(Italy) Turin	6th	400 m hs	DNF	

== National titles ==
Luigi Facelli won 17 competitions in the Italian national championship for athletics.

- 11 wins on 400 metres hurdles (1924, 1925, 1926, 1927, 1928, 1929, 1930, 1931, 1935, 1936, 1938)
- 2 wins on 400 metres (1926, 1930)
- 2 wins on 110 metres hurdles (1930, 1931)
- 2 wins on Triple jump (1923, 1929)

== See also ==
- Italy national relay team
