= Masao Ichihara =

Japanese sprinter (1913–1977)

Personal information
- Nationality: Japanese
- Born: 7 November 1913 Kameoka, Japan
- Died: 1977 (aged 63–64)

Sport
- Sport: Sprinting
- Event: 4 × 400 metres relay

Masao Ichihara (市原 正雄, Ichihara Masao; 7 November 1913 – 1977) was a Japanese sprinter. He competed in the men's 4 × 400 metres relay at the 1936 Summer Olympics.
