= Edwin Thacker =

South African high jumper

Medal record

Men's athletics

Representing South Africa

British Empire Games
Gold medal – first place	1934 London	High jump
Gold medal – first place	1938 Sydney	High jump

Edwin Thomas Thacker (24 July 1913 – 4 August 1974) was a South African athlete who competed in the 1936 Summer Olympics.

He was born in Germiston.

In 1936 he finished twelfth in the Olympic high jump event.

At the 1934 Empire Games he won the gold medal high jump competition. Four years later at the 1938 Empire Games he won the gold medal in the high jump contest again.
