= Rudolf Eggenberg =

Swiss high jumper

Personal information
- Nationality: Swiss
- Born: 9 February 1911
- Died: 19 December 1991 (aged 80)

Sport
- Sport: Athletics
- Event: High jump

Rudolf Eggenberg (9 February 1911 – 19 December 1991) was a Swiss athlete. He competed in the men's high jump at the 1936 Summer Olympics.
