= Joe Healey =

American hurdler

Personal information
- Nationality: American
- Born: July 25, 1910
- Died: May 16, 1992 (aged 81)

Sport
- Sport: Track and field
- Event: 400 metres hurdles

Joe Healey (July 25, 1910 – May 16, 1992) was an American hurdler. He competed in the men's 400 metres hurdles at the 1932 Summer Olympics.
