= Hans Mohr (athlete) =

Yugoslav athlete

Personal information
- Nationality: Yugoslav
- Born: 6 August 1914
- Died: 29 June 1983 (aged 68)

Sport
- Sport: Athletics
- Event: High jump

Hans Mohr (6 August 1914 – 29 June 1983) was a Yugoslav athlete. He competed in the men's high jump at the 1936 Summer Olympics.
