= André Adelheim =

French hurdler

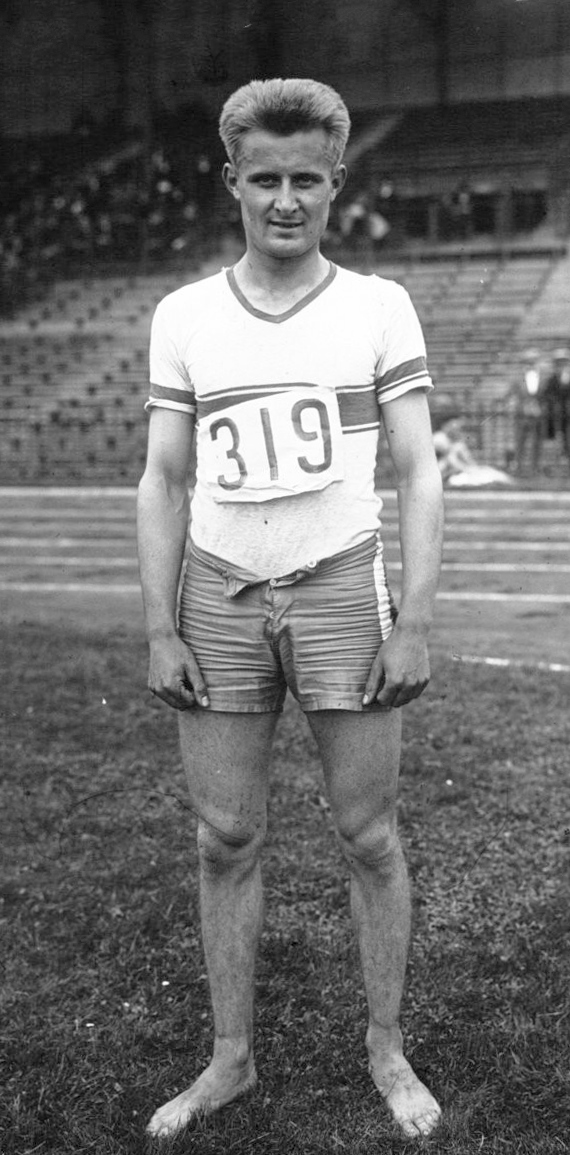
- André Adelheim in 1926

Personal information
- Born: 27 January 1906 Lepuix, France
- Died: 27 September 1951 (aged 50) Aubervilliers, France
- Height: 177 cm (5 ft 10 in)
- Weight: 70 kg (154 lb)

Sport
- Sport: Athletics
- Event: Hurdles
- Club: Métropolitain Club Colombes; FC Sochaux, Sochaux

Achievements and titles
- Personal best: 400 mH – 53.2 (1928)

André Adelheim (27 January 1906 – 27 September 1951) was a French hurdler. He competed in the 400 m event at the 1928 and 1932 Summer Olympics, but failed to reach the finals.
