= Thomas Coulter (ice hockey) =

Canadian ice hockey player

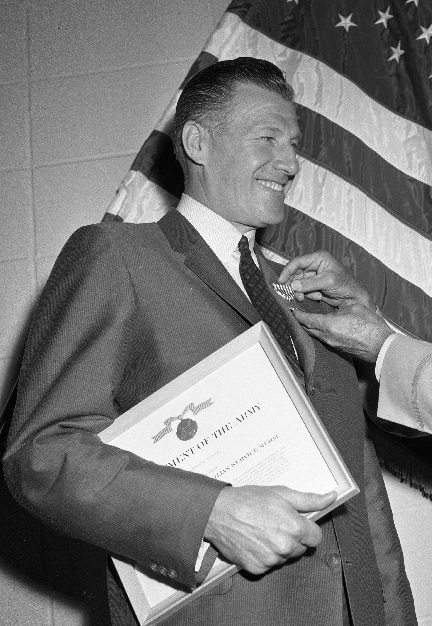
- Born: April 21, 1911 Winnipeg, Manitoba, Canada
- Died: December 17, 2003 (aged 92) Skokie, Illinois, U.S.
- Height: 6 ft 2 in (188 cm)
- Weight: 195 lb (88 kg; 13 st 13 lb)
- Position: Defence
- Shot: Left
- Played for: Chicago Black Hawks
- Playing career: 1933–1935

Thomas Henry Coulter (April 21, 1911 – December 17, 2003) was a Canadian-American professional ice hockey defenceman who played two National Hockey League games for the Chicago Black Hawks during the 1933–34 season as a way to pay for tuition as an engineer. He was brother to Arthur Coulter and was the first NHL player to play in an Australian ice hockey league, playing one game for St. George's IHC. Coulter also worked as CEO of the Chicago Association of Commerce and Industry for 27 years.

In addition to hockey, Coulter was listed as the 29th-fastest track and field athlete in the world in 1931.

== Early life and education ==
Coulter was born in Winnipeg, Manitoba, in 1911. Coulter moved to Pittsburgh to attend Carnegie Mellon University, where he earned a Bachelor of Science degree in engineering in 1933. He competed in the 1932 Olympic Games as a member of Canada's track team and then attended graduate school at the University of Chicago, receiving a master's degree in economics in 1935.

== Career ==
Coulter's business career began in 1935 and for the next 20 years was engaged with Chicago enterprises in manufacturing and consulting before becoming CEO of the Chicago Association of Commerce and Industry in 1954. It was at this point Coulter's vision for Chicago as a worldwide center for trade came into view. He organized and directed six major international trade fairs including a visit by Elizabeth II and Prince Philip, Duke of Edinburgh on the opening of the St. Lawrence Seaway.

He received the “Award of Merit” from Carnegie Mellon University for outstanding personal achievement in the field of business organization and the Citation for Public Service from the University of Chicago. His vision for Chicago will continue to be realized through scholarships he created and organizations he established, some of which have grown to be the largest of their kind in the country, including the Japan America society.

He served as the director of the Chicago-Tokyo Bank for many years. He also served as president of the Executives Club of Chicago (1948–1953) and the Sales and Marketing Executives Club of Chicago (1948–1956).

== Personal life ==
Coulter married Mary Alice in 1937. His brother, Art Coulter, was also a hockey player.

== Career statistics ==
=== Regular season and playoffs ===
			Regular season					Playoffs
Season	Team	League	GP	G	A	Pts	PIM	GP	G	A	Pts	PIM
1930–31	Winnipeg Carnegie Tech	WSrHL	—	—	—	—	—	—	—	—	—	—
1933–34	Chicago Black Hawks	NHL	2	0	0	0	0	—	—	—	—	—
1933–34	Oklahoma City Warriors	AHA	47	2	1	3	30	—	—	—	—	—
1934–35	Cleveland Falcons	IHL	6	0	0	0	0	—	—	—	—	—
NHL totals			2	0	0	0	0	—	—	—	—	—
