= John Sheffield (British Army officer) =

British athlete

Major-General John Sheffield CB CBE
- Born: 28 April 1910; Rudgwick, England
- Died: 30 July 1987 (aged 77) Hampshire, England
- Sports career
- Nationality: British (English)
- Sport: Track and field
- Event: 400 metres hurdles
- Club: Milocarian Athletic Club

Major-General John Sheffield CB CBE (28 April 1910 – 30 July 1987) was a British Army officer and hurdler who competed at the 1936 Summer Olympics.

== Biography ==
Sheffield became the national 440 yards hurdles champion after winning the British AAA Championships title at the 1936 AAA Championships.

One month later he was selected to represent Great Britain at the 1936 Olympic Games held in Berlin, where he competed in the men's 400 metres hurdles.
