= Sandy Duncan (athlete) =

British athlete

Sandy Duncan OBE
Personal information
- Nationality: British (English)
- Born: 26 April 1912 Crawshaw Booth, Lancashire, England
- Died: 18 June 2005 (aged 93) London, England

Sport
- Sport: Athletics
- Event: long jump
- Club: Achilles Club
Medal record
Men's Athletics
Representing England
British Empire Games
Silver medal – second place	1938 Sydney	4×110 yd

Kenneth Sandilands "Sandy" Duncan OBE (26 April 1912 – 18 June 2005) was an English athlete who competed in the 1934 British Empire Games and in the 1938 British Empire Games. He later became one of the most distinguished and sympathetic sports officials of his generation, as the long-serving general secretary of the British Olympic Association. For many years he was synonymous with the Olympic movement in Britain.

== Biography ==
Duncan was educated at Malvern College, where his ability at the long jump was quickly evident — he won the London Athletic Club’s schools championships with a record leap of 22 ft 5 3/4in. His prowess earned him a Blue in his first year at Oxford University, and he also won the 100 yards against Cambridge, as well as getting a football Blue. In the AAA championships he came in the top six in the long jump every year from 1932 to 1937, finishing second behind Frenchman Robert Paul at the 1934 AAA Championships. Shortly afterwards, he represented England at the 1934 British Empire Games, where finished fourth in the long jump event.

He represented Britain in 1935 and, in July 1936, ran his fastest time of 9.8 seconds for the 100 yards, although a hamstring injury prevented him from being selected for the Olympics. In 1938, he was sixth in both the shot and discus. In indoor games, he won the British 70 metres dash in 1938.

At the 1938 British Empire Games, he was a member of the English relay team which won the silver medal in the 4×110 yards competition. In the long jump contest he finished tenth and in the 100 yards event he was eliminated in the heats.

During the Second World War he served in the Royal Artillery and rose to the rank of Major. After the war Duncan taught at Bradfield College and, having qualified as an AAA coach, his administrative career began in 1947 when he was made secretary of the Universities’ Athletic Union. This gave him the initial experience for his appointment, two years later, as general secretary at the British Olympic Association (BOA), the organisation responsible for the United Kingdom's participation in the Olympic Games. He held this post for 26 years, from 1949 to 1975 and served as chef de mission at 12 Olympics, summer and winter, from the 1952 Oslo and Helsinki games to Montreal in 1976. He was also honorary secretary of the Commonwealth Games Federation, supervising celebrations from Vancouver 1954 to Brisbane in 1982.

He also served as secretary of the Achilles Club, for Oxford and Cambridge Blues, for 39 years.

Duncan was appointed Member of the Order of the British Empire (MBE) in the 1950 Birthday Honours and promoted to Officer of the same Order (OBE) in the 1974 Birthday Honours. Despite this, he was probably better recognised outside Britain than in his own country. In 1952, he was given the Orders of the White Rose and Lion from Finland and the rare Olympic Award from the IOC in 1984.
