= Hamish Stothard =

British athlete

Personal information
- Nationality: British (Scottish)
- Born: 6 May 1913 Edinburgh, Scotland
- Died: 26 February 1997 (aged 83)

Sport
- Sport: Athletics
- Event: 800m / 400m
- Club: Cambridge University
Medal record
Men's Athletics
Representing Scotland
British Empire Games
Bronze medal – third place	1934 London	880 yards
Bronze medal – third place	1934 London	4×440 yards

James Charles "Hamish" Stothard (6 May 1913 – 26 February 1997) was a Scottish athlete who competed in the 1934 British Empire Games and won two bronze medals.

== Biography ==
Stothard represented Scotland at the 1934 British Empire Games, where he won the bronze medal in the 880 yards event. He was also a member of the Scottish relay team which won the bronze medal in the 4×440 yards competition. The following year, Stothard became the national 880 yards champion after winning the British AAA Championships title in the 880 yards event at the 1935 AAA Championships.
