= Hiroshi Tanaka (high jumper) =

Japanese high jumper (born 1915)

Personal information
- Nationality: Japanese
- Born: 29 June 1915

Sport
- Sport: Athletics
- Event: High jump

Hiroshi Tanaka (田中 弘, Tanaka Hiroshi; born 29 June 1915, date of death unknown) was a Japanese track and field athlete. He competed in the men's high jump at the 1936 Summer Olympics.
