= József Vadas =

Hungarian sprinter

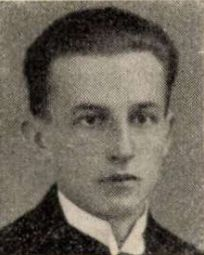
József Vadas

József Vadas (19 September 1911 – 5 June 2006) was a Hungarian sprinter who competed in the 1936 Summer Olympics. He was born in Székesfehérvár.
