= Grethe Whitehead =

British athlete (1914–2000)

Personal information
- Nationality: British
- Born: 24 June 1914
- Died: April 2000

Sport
- Sport: Track and field
- Event: 80 metres hurdles

Grethe Whitehead (24 June 1914 – April 2000) was a British hurdler. She competed in the women's 80 metres hurdles at the 1936 Summer Olympics.
