= Juul Bosmans =

Belgian hurdler

Personal information
- Nationality: Belgian
- Born: 23 April 1914 Mortsel, Antwerp
- Died: 29 November 2000 (aged 86) Mortsel, Antwerp
- Height: 178 cm (5 ft 10 in)
- Weight: 70 kg (154 lb)

Sport
- Sport: Track and field
- Event: 110 metres/440 yards hurdles
- Club: Beerschot VAC, Antwerpen

Jules Delphine Bosmans also known as Juul Bosmans (23 April 1914 – 29 November 2000) was a Belgian hurdler who competed at the 1936 Summer Olympics.

== Biography ==
At the 1936 Olympic Games in Berlin, Bosmans competed in the men's 110 metres hurdles.

Bosmans won three consecutive 440 yards titles at the prestigious AAA Championships. The first was at the 1937 AAA Championships, followed by successes at the 1938 AAA Championships and 1939 AAA Championships before his career was interrupted by World War II.
