= Confédération Internationale des Étudiants =

- English: International Confederation of Students
- Established: 1919
- Founders: Union Nationale des Étudiants de France
- Founded at: Strasbourg, France
- Dissolved: 1946
- Type: Students union
- Formerly called: Confédération Interalliée des Étudiants (English: Interallied Student Confederation), 1919-1921

The Confédération Internationale des Étudiants (International Confederation of Students) was an international student organization that existed from 1919 to 1946.

== History ==
The CIE was founded at the Strasbourg Congress of the Union nationale des étudiants de France (National Union of Students of France) in 1919, with representatives from 17 countries in attendance. It was initially established as "Confédération Interalliée des Étudiants - CIE" (English: Interallied Student Confederation) and was made up of the national students' union of seven countries: Belgium, Czechoslovakia, France, Luxembourg, Poland, Romania, and Spain. The confederation was renamed to Confédération Internationale des Étudiants (International Confederation of Students) at its 1921 congress held in Prague. By the end of the 1923 congress in The Hague, ten more nations had joined the confederation as full members: Denmark, England, Finland, Italy, The Netherlands, Kingdom of the Serbs, Croats and Slovenes (Yugoslavia), Norway, Scotland, (Note: The Union of Scottish Students did not merge into NUS UK until 1972 and was therefore treated as a separate member within the confederation.) Sweden, and Switzerland. They were by three free members (without voting rights): Greece, Ukraine, and the United States. At its peak in 1934, the confederation is made up of 26 full members, 1 associate member, and 10 free members.

The confederation was the organiser of the World University Games between 1924 and 1947. (Note: The 1923 International Universities Championships were organised by the Union Nationale des Étudiants de France (UNEF). Prior to that, in 1918, students' union presidents in the United Kingdom expressed the need to have an association to promote sport at universities across the country. The Inter-Varsity Athletics Board of England and Wales (IVAB) was established in 1919 and organised the first inter-varsity track and field meeting that year at Manchester University.) It also advocated on issues such as international recognition of university degrees, knowledge exchange, and student travel. Some of their initiatives included the creation of International Student ID cards as well as student travel companies.

The confederation was, however, not interested in "discussing religious and political questions", such as mutual aids, gender inequality, as well as the representation of students from colonised nations. This reluctance to be political led to criticisms from some members of the confederation. For example, in 1937, the CIE's refusal to condemn antisemitic attacks in Romania led to England's National Union of Students withdrawing from the confederation as a member.

The activities of the confederation were heavily affected due to the start of the Second World War in 1939. Its headquarter in Brussels were destroyed by German troops in 1940, leading to the organisation becoming completely inactive. It was officially dissolved by 1946.

== Presidents ==
The office of president was held by the following people:

Years in office	President	Country
1919-1924	Jean Gérard	France
1924-1927	Jan Billinski-Jundzill	Poland
1927-1928	Roberto Maltini	Italy
1928-1929	Gordon Bagnall	England
1929-1931	Paul Saurin	France
1931-1933	Jan Pozaryski	Poland
1933-1934	Denis Follows	England
1934-1935	Dino Gardini	Italy
1936-1937	Roberts Plūme	Latvia
1937-1938	Lincoln Ralphs	England
1938-1939	Claude Delorme	France
1939-1940	Jerzy Przezdziecki	Poland
1939-1940	Armand Bernath (honorary)	Switzerland
