= Wanda Nowak =

Austrian high jumper

Personal information
- Nationality: Austrian
- Born: 16 January 1913
- Died: 30 April 1977 (aged 64)

Sport
- Sport: Athletics
- Event: High jump

Wanda Nowak (16 January 1913 – 30 April 1977) was an Austrian athlete. She competed in the women's high jump at the 1936 Summer Olympics.
