= Gerhard Hilbrecht =

German discus thrower

Personal information
- Nationality: German
- Born: 2 April 1915
- Died: 1 November 1996 (aged 81)

Sport
- Sport: Athletics
- Event: Discus throw

Gerhard Hilbrecht (2 April 1915 – 1 November 1996) was a German athlete. He competed in the men's discus throw at the 1936 Summer Olympics.
