= Wolfgang Dessecker =

German middle-distance runner

Personal information
- Nationality: German
- Born: 18 August 1911 Stuttgart, Kingdom of Württemberg, German Empire
- Died: 26 March 1973 (aged 61) Stuttgart, West Germany

Sport
- Sport: Middle-distance running
- Event: 800 metres
Medal record
Men's athletics
Representing Germany
European Championships
Bronze medal – third place	1934 Turin	800 m

Wolfgang Dessecker (18 August 1911 – 26 March 1973) was a German middle-distance runner. He competed in the men's 800 metres at the 1936 Summer Olympics.
