= Gustav Weinkötz =

German high jumper

Personal information
- Nationality: German
- Born: 17 December 1912 Mannheim, German Empire
- Died: 28 March 1986 (aged 73) Grasellenbach, West Germany

Sport
- Sport: Athletics
- Event: High jump

Gustav Weinkötz (17 December 1912 – 28 March 1986) was a German athlete. He competed in the men's high jump at the 1936 Summer Olympics.
