= József Kovács (hurdler) =

Hungarian sprinter and hurdler

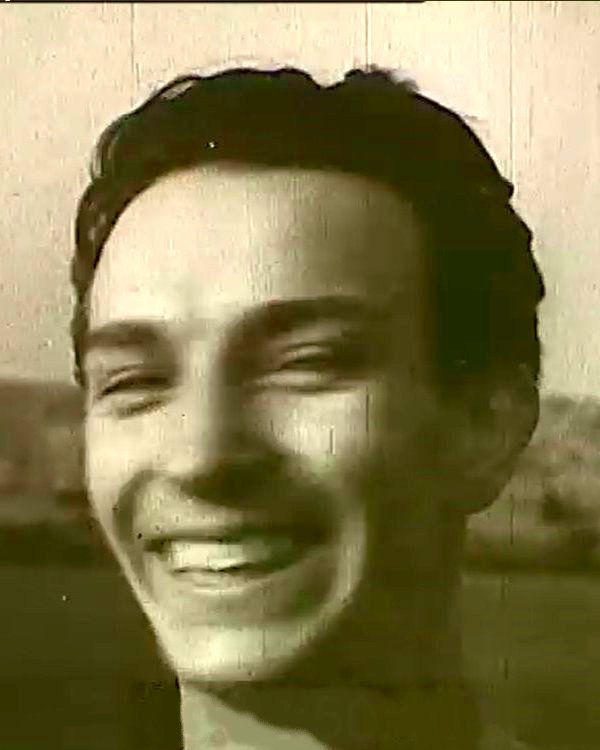

Personal information
- Born: 14 March 1911 Budapest
- Died: 18 August 1990 (aged 79) Budapest
Medal record
Men's athletics
Representing Hungary
European Championships
Gold medal – first place	1934 Turin	110 m hurdles
Silver medal – second place	1934 Turin	4×100 m
Silver medal – second place	1938 Paris	400 m hurdles

József Kovács (14 March 1911 – 18 August 1990) was a Hungarian athlete who competed in the 1936 Summer Olympics. He was born and died in Budapest.

== Competition record ==
Year	Competition	Venue	Position	Event	Notes
Representing Hungary
1934	European Championships	Turin, Italy	4th	200 m	21.7
