= Fritz Nottbrock =

German hurdler

Personal information
- Nationality: German
- Born: 30 July 1910 Cologne, Germany
- Died: 13 March 1997 (aged 86) Cologne, Germany

Sport
- Sport: Track and field
- Event: 400 metres hurdles

Fritz Nottbrock (30 July 1910 – 13 March 1997) was a German hurdler. He competed in the 400 metres hurdles at the 1932 Summer Olympics and the 1936 Summer Olympics.
