= Men's shot put world record progression =

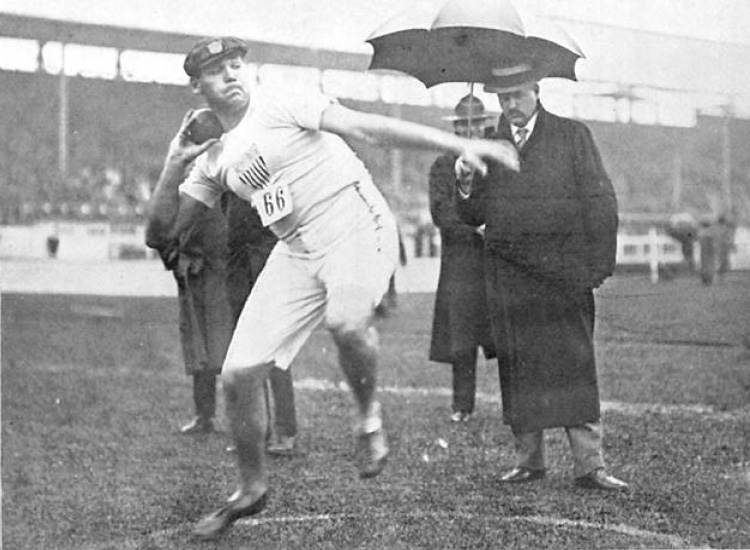
Ralph Rose, American shot putter

The first world record in the men's shot put was recognised by the International Association of Athletics Federations in 1912. That inaugural record was the 15.54 m performance by Ralph Rose in 1909.

As of June 21, 2009, 51 world records had been ratified by the IAAF in the event. The distances by these men were accomplished with a 16-pound shot. Rose's 1909 record lasted almost 19 years, and the record was untouched for almost a dozen years surrounding World War II. The record was improved upon five times in 1960 and four times in 1934. The record set in 1990 held for over 31 years before it was broken in 2021. The current world record was set in 2023. Since 1954, marks set in Los Angeles have stood for 42 of those years and counting.

== World record progression ==
| Ratified |
| Not ratified |
| Ratified but later rescinded |
| Pending ratification |

=== Indoor ===
Only records since Günthör's 22.26 m in 1987 were ratified by the IAAF.

Men's shot put indoor world record progression
| Mark | Athlete | Date | Location |
|---|---|---|---|
| 12.79 m (41 ft 11 1/2 in) | Charles Queckberner (USA) | 9 April 1887 | New York |
| 13.03 m (42 ft 8 3/4 in) | George Gray (CAN) | 19 November 1887 | New York |
| 13.07 m (42 ft 10 1/2 in) | James Mitchell (USA) | 15 February 1890 | Boston |
| 13.10 m (42 ft 11 1/2 in) | C.H. Robinson (USA) | 1 February 1903 | New York |
| 14.27 m (46 ft 9 3/4 in) | Harry Le Moyne (USA) | 8 March 1904 | New York |
| 14.98 m (49 ft 1 3/4 in) | Wesley Coe (USA) | 25 February 1905 | Medford, Massachusetts |
| 15.41 m (50 ft 6 1/2 in) | John Kuck (USA) | 27 February 1926 | Champaign |
| 15.43 m (50 ft 7 1/4 in) | Herbert Schwarze (USA) | 6 March 1926 | Chicago |
| 15.47 m (50 ft 9 in) | Emil Hirschfeld (GER) | 2 March 1929 | Frankfurt |
| 15.56 m (51 ft 1/2 in) | Harlow Rothert (USA) | 28 March 1929 | Seattle |
| 15.56 m (51 ft 1/2 in) | Emil Hirschfeld (GER) | 8 March 1930 | Frankfurt |
| 15.61 m (51 ft 2 1/2 in) | Herman Brix (USA) | 18 March 1930 | New York |
| 15.82 m (51 ft 10 3/4 in) | Leo Sexton (USA) | 13 February 1932 | Boston |
| 16.06 m (52 ft 8 1/4 in) | Leo Sexton (USA) | 17 February 1932 | New York |
| 16.19 m (53 ft 1 1/4 in) | Jack Torrance (USA) | 25 February 1935 | Charlotte |
| 16.25 m (53 ft 3 3/4 in) | Francis Ryan (USA) | 17 February 1940 | New York |
| 16.36 m (53 ft 8 in) | Alfred Blozis (USA) | 17 February 1940 | New York |
| 16.98 m (55 ft 8 1/2 in) | Alfred Blozis (USA) | 24 February 1940 | New York |
| 17.08 m (56 ft 1/4 in) | Alfred Blozis (USA) | 21 June 1940 | Minneapolis |
| 17.22 m (56 ft 5 3/4 in) | Alfred Blozis (USA) | 1 March 1941 | New York |
| 17.23 m (56 ft 6 1/4 in) | Charles Fonville (USA) | 7 February 1948 | East Lansing |
| 17.34 m (56 ft 10 1/2 in) | Charles Fonville (USA) | 21 February 1948 | Ann Arbor |
| 17.54 m (57 ft 6 1/2 in) | James Fuchs (USA) | 4 February 1950 | Boston |
| 17.57 m (57 ft 7 1/2 in) | James Fuchs (USA) | 11 February 1950 | New York |
| 17.77 m (58 ft 3 1/2 in) | James Fuchs (USA) | 10 February 1951 | New York |
| 18.08 m (59 ft 3 3/4 in) | Parry O'Brien (USA) | 20 February 1954 | New York |
| 18.12 m (59 ft 5 1/4 in) | Parry O'Brien (USA) | 19 February 1955 | New York |
| 18.21 m (59 ft 8 3/4 in) | Parry O'Brien (USA) | 11 February 1956 | New York |
| 18.72 m (61 ft 5 in) | Parry O'Brien (USA) | 18 February 1956 | New York |
| 18.81 m (61 ft 8 1/2 in) | Parry O'Brien (USA) | 8 February 1958 | Frankfurt |
| 18.93 m (62 ft 1 1/4 in) | Parry O'Brien (USA) | 21 February 1959 | New York |
| 19.02 m (62 ft 4 3/4 in) | Parry O'Brien (USA) | 12 March 1960 | Milwaukee |
| 19.24 m (63 ft 1 1/4 in) | Parry O'Brien (USA) | 21 January 1961 | Los Angeles |
| 19.46 m (63 ft 10 in) | Gary Gubner (USA) | 2 February 1962 | New York |
| 19.77 m (64 ft 10 1/4 in) | Gary Gubner (USA) | 16 February 1962 | New York |
| 19.80 m (64 ft 11 1/2 in) | Gary Gubner (USA) | 16 February 1962 | New York |
| 20.02 m (65 ft 8 in) | Randy Matson (USA) | 12 February 1965 | Fort Worth |
| 20.17 m (66 ft 2 in) | Randy Matson (USA) | 13 February 1965 | Dallas |
| 20.29 m (66 ft 6 3/4 in) | Neal Steinhauer (USA) | 7 January 1967 | San Francisco |
| 20.37 m (66 ft 9 3/4 in) | Neal Steinhauer (USA) | 28 January 1967 | Portland |
| 20.60 m (67 ft 7 in) | Neal Steinhauer (USA) | 28 January 1967 | Portland |
| 20.67 m (67 ft 9 3/4 in) | Neal Steinhauer (USA) | 28 January 1967 | Portland |
| 20.97 m (68 ft 9 1/2 in) | Randy Matson (USA) | 10 February 1967 | Fort Worth |
| 21.08 m (69 ft 1 3/4 in) | Randy Matson (USA) | 10 February 1967 | Fort Worth |
| 21.15 m (69 ft 4 1/2 in) | Al Feuerbach (USA) | 5 February 1972 | Pocatello |
| 21.17 m (69 ft 5 1/4 in) | Al Feuerbach (USA) | 27 January 1973 | Portland |
| 21.27 m (69 ft 9 1/4 in) | George Woods (USA) | 23 February 1973 | New York |
| 21.30 m (69 ft 10 1/2 in) | George Woods (USA) | 26 January 1974 | Portland |
| 21.45 m (70 ft 4 1/4 in) | George Woods (USA) | 1 February 1974 | San Francisco |
| 21.47 m (70 ft 5 1/4 in) | George Woods (USA) | 8 February 1974 | Inglewood |
| 21.56 m (70 ft 8 3/4 in) | George Woods (USA) | 8 February 1974 | Inglewood |
| 22.02 m (72 ft 2 3/4 in) | George Woods (USA) | 8 February 1974 | Inglewood |
| 22.15 m (72 ft 8 in) | Ulf Timmermann (GDR) | 16 February 1985 | Senftenberg |
| 22.26 m (73 ft 1/4 in) | Werner Günthör (SUI) | 8 February 1987 | Magglingen |
| 22.66 m (74 ft 4 in) | Randy Barnes (USA) | 20 January 1989 | Los Angeles |
| 22.82 m (74 ft 10 1/4 in) | Ryan Crouser (USA) | 24 January 2021 | Fayetteville, AR |

=== Outdoor ===
| Mark | Athlete | Date | Location |
|---|---|---|---|
| 15.54 m | Ralph Rose (USA) | 21 August 1909 | San Francisco, U.S. |
| 15.79 m | Emil Hirschfeld (GER) | 6 May 1928 | Breslau, Germany |
| 15.87 m | John Kuck (USA) | 29 July 1928 | Amsterdam, Netherlands |
| 16.04 m | Emil Hirschfeld (GER) | 26 August 1928 | Bochum, Germany |
| 16.04 m | František Douda (TCH) | 4 October 1931 | Brno, Czechoslovakia |
| 16.05 m | Zygmunt Heljasz (POL) | 29 June 1932 | Poznań, Poland |
| 16.16 m | Leo Sexton (USA) | 27 August 1932 | Freeport, U.S. |
| 16.20 m | František Douda (TCH) | 24 September 1932 | Prague, Czechoslovakia |
| 16.48 m | John Lyman (USA) | 21 April 1934 | Palo Alto, U.S. |
| 16.80 m | Jack Torrance (USA) | 27 April 1934 | Des Moines, U.S. |
| 16.89 m | Jack Torrance (USA) | 30 June 1934 | Milwaukee, U.S. |
| 17.40 m | Jack Torrance (USA) | 5 August 1934 | Oslo, Norway |
| 17.68 m | Charlie Fonville (USA) | 17 April 1948 | Lawrence, U.S. |
| 17.79 m | Jim Fuchs (USA) | 28 July 1949 | Oslo, Norway |
| 17.82 m | Jim Fuchs (USA) | 29 April 1950 | Los Angeles, U.S. |
| 17.90 m | Jim Fuchs (USA) | 20 August 1950 | Visby, Sweden |
| 17.95 m | Jim Fuchs (USA) | 22 August 1950 | Eskilstuna, Sweden |
| 18.00 m | Parry O'Brien (USA) | 9 May 1953 | Fresno, U.S. |
| 18.04 m | Parry O'Brien (USA) | 5 June 1953 | Compton, U.S. |
| 18.42 m | Parry O'Brien (USA) | 8 May 1954 | Los Angeles, U.S. |
| 18.43 m | Parry O'Brien (USA) | 21 May 1954 | Los Angeles, U.S. |
| 18.54 m | Parry O'Brien (USA) | 11 June 1954 | Los Angeles, U.S. |
| 18.62 m | Parry O'Brien (USA) | 5 May 1956 | Salt Lake City, U.S. |
| 18.69 m | Parry O'Brien (USA) | 15 June 1956 | Los Angeles, U.S. |
| 19.06 m | Parry O'Brien (USA) | 3 September 1956 | Eugene, U.S. |
| 19.25 m | Parry O'Brien (USA) | 1 November 1956 | Los Angeles, U.S. |
| 19.25 m | Dallas Long (USA) | 28 March 1959 | Santa Barbara, U.S. |
| 19.30 m | Parry O'Brien (USA) | 1 August 1959 | Albuquerque, U.S. |
| 19.38 m | Dallas Long (USA) | 5 March 1960 | Los Angeles, U.S. |
| 19.45 m | Bill Nieder (USA) | 19 March 1960 | Palo Alto, U.S. |
| 19.67 m | Dallas Long (USA) | 26 March 1960 | Los Angeles, U.S. |
| 19.99 m | Bill Nieder (USA) | 2 April 1960 | Austin, U.S. |
| 20.06 m | Bill Nieder (USA) | 12 August 1960 | Walnut, U.S. |
| 20.08 m | Dallas Long (USA) | 18 May 1962 | Los Angeles, U.S. |
| 20.10 m | Dallas Long (USA) | 4 April 1964 | Los Angeles, U.S. |
| 20.20 m | Dallas Long (USA) | 29 May 1964 | Los Angeles, U.S. |
| 20.68 m | Dallas Long (USA) | 25 July 1964 | Los Angeles, U.S. |
| 21.52 m | Randy Matson (USA) | 8 May 1965 | College Station, U.S. |
| 21.78 m | Randy Matson (USA) | 23 April 1967 | College Station, U.S. |
| 21.82 m | Al Feuerbach (USA) | 5 May 1973 | San Jose, U.S. |
| 22.86 m | Brian Oldfield (USA) | 10 May 1975 | El Paso, United States |
| 21.85 m | Terry Albritton (USA) | 21 February 1976 | Honolulu, Hawaii, U.S. |
| 22.00 m | Aleksandr Baryshnikov (URS) | 10 June 1976 | Paris, France |
| 22.15 m | Udo Beyer (GDR) | 6 July 1978 | Gothenburg, Sweden |
| 22.22 m | Udo Beyer (GDR) | 25 June 1983 | Los Angeles, U.S. |
| 22.62 m | Ulf Timmermann (GDR) | 22 September 1985 | Berlin, Germany |
| 22.64 m | Udo Beyer (GDR) | 20 August 1986 | Berlin, Germany |
| 22.72 m | Alessandro Andrei (ITA) | 12 August 1987 | Viareggio, Italy |
| 22.84 m | Alessandro Andrei (ITA) | 12 August 1987 | Viareggio, Italy |
| 22.91 m | Alessandro Andrei (ITA) | 12 August 1987 | Viareggio, Italy |
| 23.06 m | Ulf Timmermann (GDR) | 22 May 1988 | Chania, Greece |
| 23.12 m | Randy Barnes (USA) | 20 May 1990 | Los Angeles, U.S. |
| 23.37 m | Ryan Crouser (USA) | 18 June 2021 | Eugene, U.S. |
| 23.56 m | Ryan Crouser (USA) | 27 May 2023 | Westwood, U.S. |

== See also ==
- Women's shot put world record progression
