= Athletics at the 1932 Summer Olympics – Men's shot put =

Men's shot put at the Games of the X Olympiad
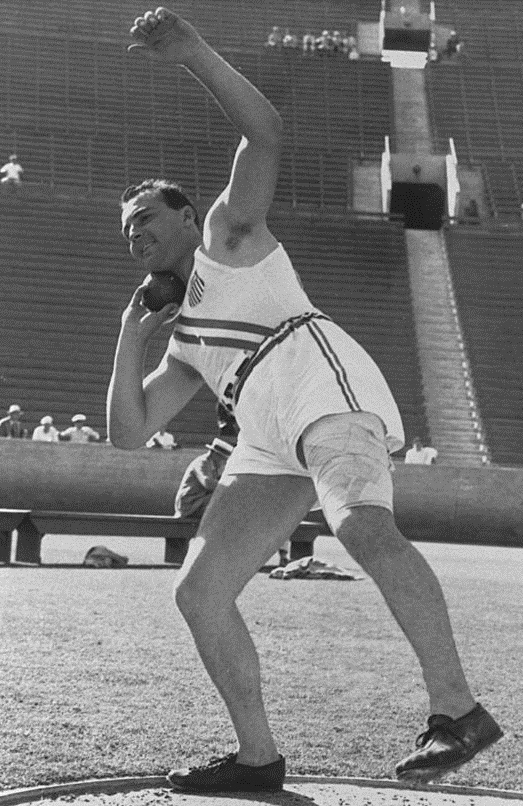
- Leo Sexton
- Venue: Los Angeles Memorial Coliseum
- Dates: July 31, 1932
- Competitors: 15 from 10 nations
- Winning distance: 16.005 OR

Medalists
1st place, gold medalist(s)		Leo Sexton; United States
2nd place, silver medalist(s)		Harlow Rothert; United States
3rd place, bronze medalist(s)		František Douda; Czechoslovakia

The men's shot put event at the 1932 Olympic Games took place July 31. 15 athletes from 10 nations competed. The 1930 Olympic Congress in Berlin had reduced the limit from 4 athletes per NOC to 3 athletes. Leo Sexton of the United States won the gold medal, the nation's third consecutive and eighth overall victory in the men's shot put. It was also the third consecutive year the Americans took the top two places (including a full medal sweep in 1924), as Harlow Rothert took silver. František Douda won Czechoslovakia's first shot put medal with a bronze.

== Background ==
This was the ninth appearance of the event, which is one of 12 athletics events to have been held at every Summer Olympics. Bronze medalist Emil Hirschfeld of Germany was the only returning thrower from the 1928 Games. The top two throwers in 1932 were Leo Sexton and Bruce Bennett of the United States; Bennett failed to make the American team, however, leaving Sexton as the Olympic favorite. He faced strong challengers, however, as Hirschfeld, František Douda of Czechoslovakia, and Zygmunt Heljasz of Poland had taken turns as world record holder between 1928 and 1932.

Argentina, Poland, and South Africa each made their debut in the men's shot put. The United States appeared for the ninth time, the only nation to have competed in all Olympic shot put competitions to date.

== Competition format ==
The competition continued to use the two-round format used in 1900 and since 1908, with results carrying over between rounds. Each athlete received three throws in the qualifying round. The top six men advanced to the final, where they received an additional three throws. The best result, qualifying or final, counted.

== Records ==
These were the standing world and Olympic records (in metres) prior to the 1932 Summer Olympics.

World record	Zygmunt Heljasz (POL)	16.05	Poznań, Poland	29 June 1932
Olympic record	John Kuck (USA)	15.87	Amsterdam, Netherlands	29 July 1928

Leo Sexton broke the Olympic record with a 15.940 metres throw in the fourth round before breaking it again with 16.005 metres in the final throw.

== Schedule ==
Date	Time	Round
Sunday, 31 July 1932	14:30	Final

== Results ==
Rank	Athlete	Nation	1	2	3	4	5	6	Distance	Notes
1st place, gold medalist(s)	Leo Sexton	United States	15.600	15.560	15.720	15.940 OR	15.480	16.005 OR	16.005	OR
2nd place, silver medalist(s)	Harlow Rothert	United States	15.670	15.675	15.430	14.990	X	X	15.675	
3rd place, bronze medalist(s)	František Douda	Czechoslovakia	15.610	15.240	14.490	15.050	15.220	15.330	15.610	
4	Emil Hirschfeld	Germany	15.210	15.360	15.020	15.380	15.540	15.560	15.560	
5	Nelson Gray	United States	15.460	14.900	14.840	13.740	X	X	15.460	
6	Hans-Heinrich Sievert	Germany	13.870	14.990	14.750	15.070	X	X	15.070	
7	Zygmunt Heljasz	Poland	13.800	14.800	14.490	Did not advance			14.800	
8	József Darányi	Hungary	14.580	14.680	14.670	Did not advance			14.680	
9	Kalle Järvinen	Finland	13.800	14.630	13.910	Did not advance			14.630	
10	Jules Noël	France	14.370	13.910	14.530	Did not advance			14.530	
11	Harry Hart	South Africa	14.470	X	14.220	Did not advance			14.470	
12	Clément Duhour	France	X	12.310	13.960	Did not advance			13.960	
13	Paul Winter	France	12.570	12.600	13.140	Did not advance			13.140	
14	Pedro Elsa	Argentina	11.770	X	11.210	Did not advance			11.770	
—	Antônio Lira	Brazil	X	X	X	Did not advance			No mark	
—	Jesús Aguirre	Mexico	DNS							
—	Carmine Giorgi	Brazil	DNS							
—	Emil Janausch	Austria	DNS							
—	Pat O'Callaghan	Ireland	DNS							
—	Georgios Theodoratos	Greece	DNS							
