= Athletics at the 1928 Summer Olympics – Men's shot put =

Men's shot put at the Games of the IX Olympiad
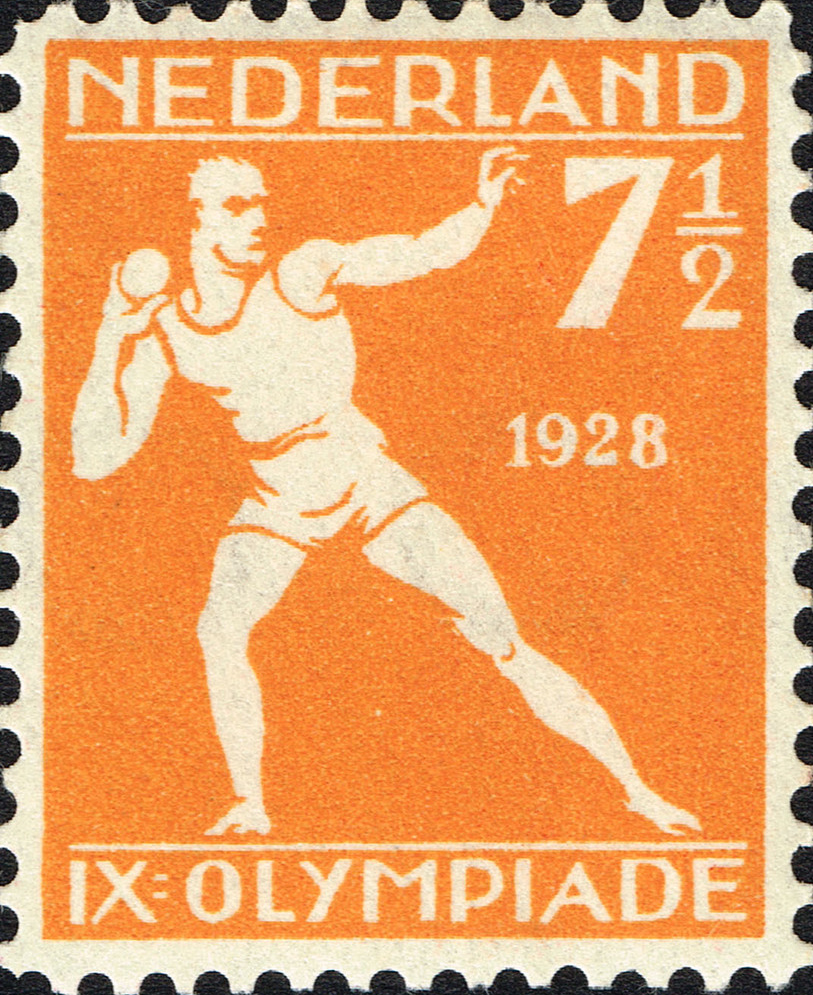
- Men's shot put at the 1928 Summer Olympics on a stamp of the Netherlands
- Venue: Olympic Stadium
- Date: July 29, 1928
- Competitors: 22 from 14 nations
- Winning distance: 15.87 WR

Medalists
1st place, gold medalist(s)		John Kuck; United States
2nd place, silver medalist(s)		Bruce Bennett; United States
3rd place, bronze medalist(s)		Emil Hirschfeld; Germany

The men's shot put event was part of the track and field athletics programme at the 1928 Summer Olympics. The competition was held on Sunday, 29 July 1928. Twenty-two shot putters from 14 nations competed. The maximum number of athletes per nation was 4. The event was won by Johnny Kuck of the United States, the nation's second consecutive, and seventh overall, victory in the men's shot put. Kuck set a new world record. Future film star Bruce Bennett, then still using his birth name Herman Brix, took silver. Emil Hirschfeld won Germany's first shot put medal with bronze.

== Background ==
This was the eighth appearance of the event, which is one of 12 athletics events to have been held at every Summer Olympics. Ninth-place finisher Raoul Paoli of France was the highest-placed returning thrower from the 1924 Games. The world record holder and favorite coming into the event was Emil Hirschfeld of Germany, attempting to become only the second man from outside the United States to win.

Czechoslovakia and Romania made their debut in the men's shot put. The United States appeared for the eighth time, the only nation to have competed in all Olympic shot put competitions to date.

== Competition format ==
The competition continued to use the two-round format employed since 1900 and maintained since 1908, wherein results carried over between rounds. During the qualifying round, each athlete was allotted three throws. The six highest-scoring male athletes advanced to the final, where they were granted an additional three throws. The best outcome, whether from the qualifying or final round, was taken into consideration for determining the final rankings.

== Records ==
These were the standing world and Olympic records (in metres) prior to the 1928 Summer Olympics.

World record	Emil Hirschfeld (GER)	15.79	Breslau, Weimar Republic	29 June 1928
Olympic record	Pat McDonald (USA)	15.34	Stockholm, Sweden	10 July 1912

At first Bruce Bennett set a new Olympic record in the first round of the qualification with 15.75 metres. Emil Hirschfeld also threw better than the old Olympic record in the first throw, but was 3 centimetres short of Bennett's new mark. In the second round of the final John Kuck set a new world record with 15.87 metres.

== Schedule ==
Date	Time	Round
Tuesday, 21 July 1928	14:00	Qualifying; Final

== Results ==
The best six shot putters qualified for the final. The throwing order is not available and the throwing series are only incompletely available for the best six throwers.

Rank	Group	Athlete	Nation	1	2	3	4	5	6	Distance	Throw-off	Notes
1st place, gold medalist(s)	2	John Kuck	United States	15.00e	14.80e	15.43	15.10e	15.87 WR	15.20e	15.87		WR
2nd place, silver medalist(s)	1	Bruce Bennett	United States	15.75 OR	15.30e	15.30e	15.40e	15.20e	15.50e	15.75		
3rd place, bronze medalist(s)	2	Emil Hirschfeld	Germany	15.72	14.98	15.52	15.63	14.78	15.01	15.72		
4	1	Eric Krenz	United States	13.80	14.99	Unknown	Unknown	Unknown	Unknown	14.99		
5	1	Armas Wahlstedt	Finland	14.69	14.40e	13.90e	14.00e	13.90e	13.92	14.69	13.92	
6	1	Wilhelm Uebler	Germany	14.69	14.64	14.66	13.91	14.58	13.82	14.69	13.82	
7	2	Harlow Rothert	United States	Unknown			Did not advance			14.68		
8	2	József Darányi	Hungary	Unknown			Did not advance			14.35		
9	2	Paavo Yrjölä	Finland	Unknown			Did not advance			14.01		
10	1	Werner Nüesch	Switzerland	Unknown			Did not advance			13.77		
11	2	Édouard Duhour	France	Unknown			Did not advance			13.72		
12	2	Nikolai Feldmann	Estonia	Unknown			Did not advance			13.54		
13	2	Johan Trandem	Norway	Unknown			Did not advance			13.40		
14	2	František Douda	Czechoslovakia	Unknown			Did not advance			13.12		
15	2	Dimitrios Karabatis	Greece	Unknown			Did not advance			12.98		
16	2	Ion David	Romania	Unknown			Did not advance			12.82		
17	1	Rex Woods	Great Britain	Unknown			Did not advance			12.70		
18	1	Raoul Paoli	France	Unknown			Did not advance			12.68		
19	1	Alexandru Fritz	Romania	Unknown			Did not advance			12.55		
20	2	Auguste Vos	Belgium	Unknown			Did not advance			12.52		
20	2	Robert Howland	Great Britain	Unknown			Did not advance			12.52		
22	1	Jesús Aguirre	Mexico	Unknown			Did not advance			11.33		
