= Lemonis =

Lemonis (Greek: Λεμονής) is a Greek surname. Notable people with this surname include:

- Chris Lemonis (born 1970), American college baseball coach
- Georgios Lemonis (born 1943), Greek athlete
- Kaloudis Lemonis (born 1995), Greek football player
- Marcus Lemonis (born 1973), Lebanese-born American businessman
- Takis Lemonis (born 1960), Greek football player
