= Jack Torrance (athlete) =

American athlete (1912–1969)

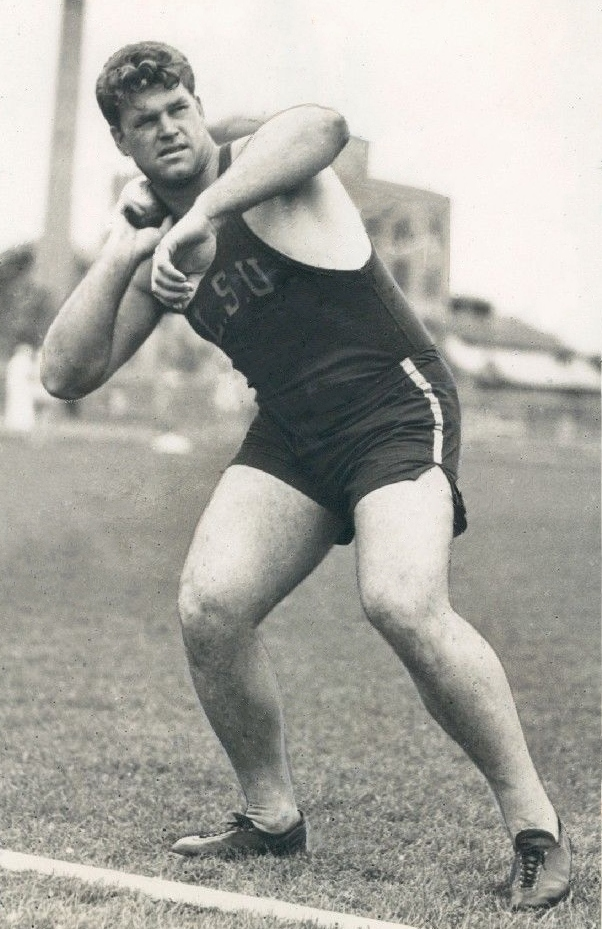
- Torrance in 1933

No. 34
- Position: Tackle

Personal information
- Born: June 20, 1912; Oak Grove, Louisiana, U.S.
- Died: November 10, 1969 (aged 57); Baton Rouge, Louisiana, U.S.
- Listed height: 6 ft 5 in (1.96 m)
- Listed weight: 285 lb (129 kg)

Career information
- High school: Oak Grove (LA)
- College: LSU

Career history
- Chicago Bears (1939–1940)

Awards and highlights
- NFL champion (1940); Pro Bowl (1940); First-team All-SEC (1933)
- Stats at Pro Football Reference

Jack Torrance (June 20, 1912 – November 10, 1969) was an American shot putter and American football player. Torrance broke the shot put world record several times in 1934, his eventual best mark of 17.40 m remaining unbeaten until 1948. At the 1936 Summer Olympics he placed fifth.

== Biography ==
Torrance studied at Louisiana State University, competing for the LSU Tigers in a variety of sports and events. Although shot put was his best event, he was also a good discus thrower, football player and basketball player. In 1933, his junior year, he won his first NCAA championship in the shot, throwing a meet record 16.10 m (52 ft 10 in) to beat his challengers by more than two feet. In addition, he placed third in the discus. LSU won the NCAA team title that year, narrowly beating favored University of Southern California. Torrance also won the national championship in the shot that year, throwing 15.68 m (51 ft 4 7/8 in) to beat Stanford's Gordon Dunn and John Lyman. His winning mark at the NCAAs was the best in the world that year and only four inches short of František Douda's world record of 16.20 m.

Torrance reached his peak in 1934, becoming the world's leading shot putter. His main rival that year was John Lyman. Torrance broke Douda's world record in Lafayette on March 24, throwing 16.30 m (53 ft 6 in). Lyman tied that mark on April 14 and then threw 16.48 m (54 ft 3/4 in) on April 21, setting a new world record. However, that record lasted for only six days as Torrance improved to 16.80 m (55 ft 1 1/2 in) at the Drake Relays. In May, he reached 17.19 m (56 ft 5 in) in an unofficial exhibition.

Torrance successfully defended both his NCAA title and his national title. At the 1934 NCAA championships he won with a put of 16.62 m (54 ft 6 9/16 in), defeating Lyman by almost a foot. However, he failed to qualify for the discus final. At the June 30 national championships in Milwaukee, Lyman improved to 16.70 m (54 ft 9 1/2 in), better than Torrance's NCAA mark; however, Torrance won with 16.89 m (55 ft 5 1/4 in), breaking his own world record.

Torrance then went on a European tour. He set his final world record at Bislett in Oslo on August 5, throwing 17.40 m (57 ft 1 in). In a separate competition in the same meet, he threw 16.73 m (54 ft 10 5/8 in) with his right hand and 11.95 m (39 ft 2 3/8 in) with his left hand to break the world record total for both hands by one centimeter. In total, he had ten competitions of 16.45 m (53 ft 11 1/2 in) or better during 1934.

While Torrance did not improve his record in 1935, he remained the world's leading shot putter. He was national champion both in the indoors and outdoors event and topped the world list at 16.60 m (54 ft 5 1/2 in), ahead of Germany's Hans Woellke and Lyman. With the Olympic Games in Berlin less than a year away, he was considered not only a clear favorite for the Olympic shot put, but one of America's top prospects in any event.

Torrance, though, was badly overweight by the summer of 1936, weighing 325 pounds in July. Attempts to reduce his weight ahead of the Olympics were unsuccessful. He had also cut down on training. Even so, he entered the Olympics as the world leader and winner of the United States Olympic Trials. In Berlin, he only managed 15.38 m (50 feet 5 1/2 in), placing him fifth.

After the Olympics, Torrance turned his attention to other sports. He debuted as a boxer in December 1936, knocking out Owen Flynn in the first round. His next three bouts were also quick knock-out wins. In the aftermath of an aborted February 1937 fight, however, his manager Herbert Brodie was suspended and fined for attempting to fix his matches. Torrance himself was found not to have played a part and continued his boxing career. On April 28, 1937 he was knocked out in the second round by Abe Simon and his boxing career subsequently went on a downward spiral.

He subsequently worked briefly as a policeman, a car salesman and as custodian of the old Louisiana State House. In 1939 he signed with Chicago Bears of the National Football League. He played tackle in a total of fifteen games in 1939 and 1940.

Torrance's shot put world record outlasted his sports career, remaining in the books until Charlie Fonville threw 17.68 m (58 ft 1/4 in) on April 17, 1948. Torrance was inducted in the Louisiana Sports Hall of Fame in 1961. He died in November 1969 of a heart attack. In 2015, Torrance was inducted into the USATF Hall of Fame in New York City.

Records
Preceded by (Czechoslovakia) František Douda	Men's Shot Put World Record Holder (unofficial); March 24, 1934 – April 21, 1934	Succeeded by (United States) John Lyman
Preceded by (United States) John Lyman	Men's Shot Put World Record Holder; April 27, 1934 – April 17, 1948	Succeeded by (United States) Charlie Fonville
