= Sezimovo Ústí =

- Town
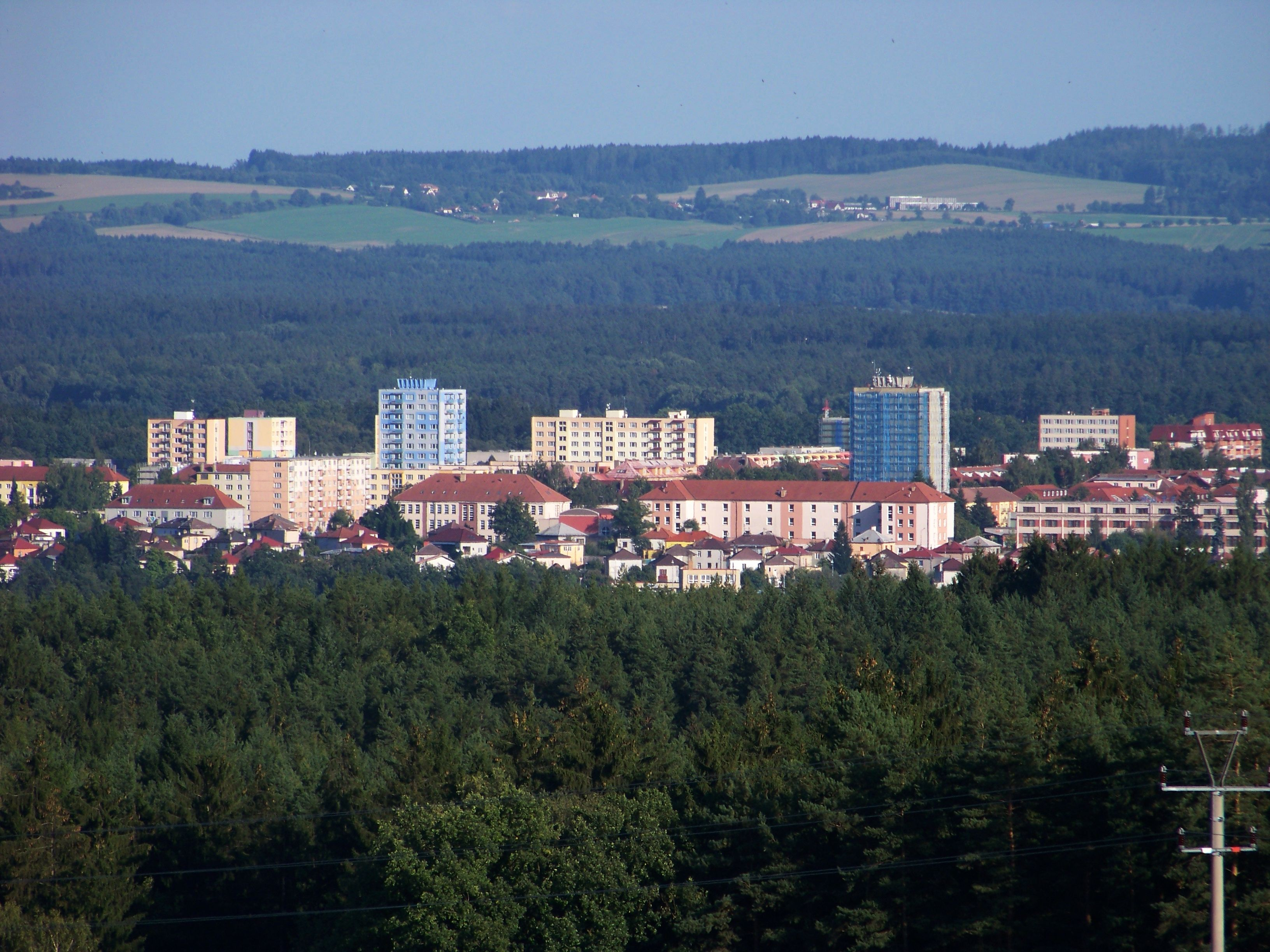
- General view from the west

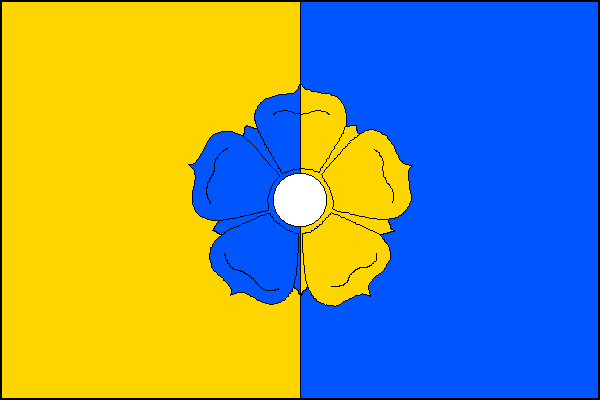
- Flag Coat of arms

- Location in the Czech Republic
- Coordinates: 49°23′7″N 14°41′4″E
- Country: Czech Republic
- Region: South Bohemian
- District: Tábor
- First mentioned: 1250

Government
  - Mayor: Martin Doležal

Area
  - Total: 8.44 km^{2} (3.26 sq mi)
- Elevation: 399 m (1,309 ft)

Population (2026-01-01)
  - Total: 7,131
  - Density: 845/km^{2} (2,190/sq mi)
- Time zone: UTC+1 (CET)
  - Summer (DST): UTC+2 (CEST)
- Postal code: 391 01, 391 02
- Website: www.sezimovo-usti.cz

Sezimovo Ústí (Czech pronunciation: [ˈsɛzɪmovo ˈuːsciː]; German: Alttabor) is a town in Tábor District in the South Bohemian Region of the Czech Republic. It has about 7,100 inhabitants. The town is located on the Lužnice River and is urbanistically fused with the neighbouring towns of Tábor and Planá nad Lužnicí.

The most important historical landmark in Sezimovo Ústí is the ruin of the Kozí hrádek Castle, protected as a national cultural monument.

== Etymology ==
The name literally means "Sezima's river mouth" in Czech.

== Geography ==
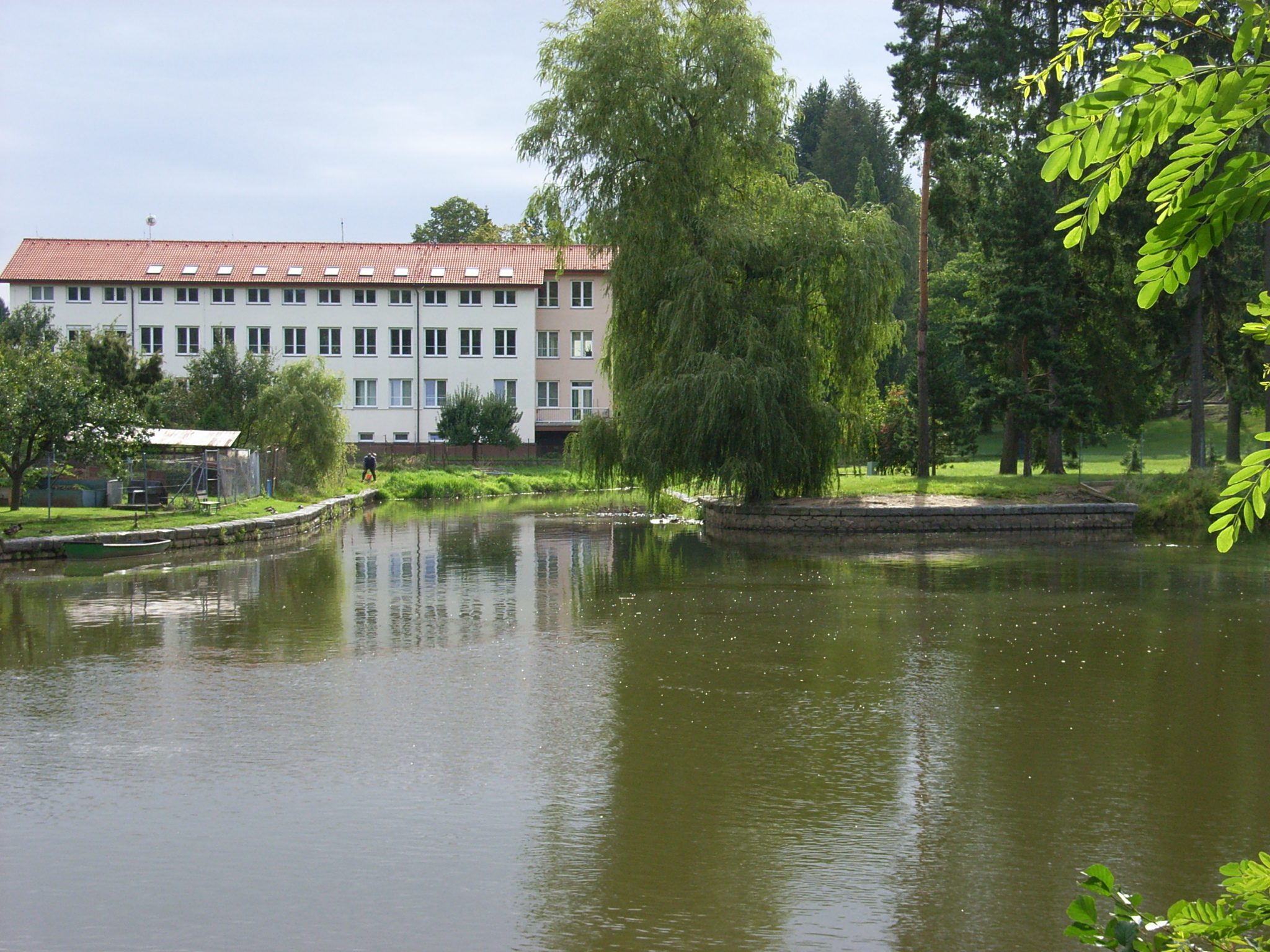
Town hall at the confluence of the Lužnice and Chotovinský potok

Sezimovo Ústí is urbanistically fused with the neighbouring towns Tábor in the north and Planá nad Lužnicí in the south. It is located about 47 kilometres (29 mi) north of České Budějovice and 72 km (45 mi) south of Prague.

Sezimovo Ústí lies in the Tábor Uplands. It is situated at the confluence of the Lužnice River (which makes the border of the municipal territory) and the stream Chotovinský potok (also called Kozský potok in the length where it flows through the town). One of the tributaries of the Chotovinský potok supplies a fishpond called Jezero.

== History ==
According to legend, Sezimovo Ústí was founded by Sezima, an illegitimate son of Witiko of Prčice. The town was established in the first half of the 13th century. The first mention of Ústí is from 1250, when the general chapter of the Dominican Order agreed to the consecration of the monastery church to Saint Dominic. The town prospered, which resulted from a convenient place on the way from Austria to Prague. Only six years after the church was consecrated, the monastery was expanded so the town must have already been prosperous enough to allow investment like that. The town was later fortified and had three suburbs, one of them on the other bank of the Lužnice River. From 1388, the independent parish church had its own hospital and school.

In 1414, Jan Hus was invited to Sezimovo Ústí to preach in Kozí hrádek Castle, which led the radicalisation of many people and establishment of Hussite movement. In 1420, Hussites burned down the town and left to the nearby newly established town of Tábor. Some parts of the abandoned town were still used in the time of King George of Poděbrady and the Dominican friars returned to the damaged monastery after 1420 for some time. Water mill and one farm was also on the grounds of the old town for most of the time after the town was abandoned.

In 1828, a new village was founded and was named Starý Tábor ('Old Tábor'). About 80 houses were built or under construction in 1832. Construction of the new church started in 1835 and it was consecrated in 1841. In 1920, the village was promoted to a town and returned to its historical name of Sezimovo Ústí. In 1939, the entrepreneur Jan Antonín Baťa built a factory and began to build a new district of Sezimovo Ústí, nowadays called Sezimovo Ústí 2. During World War II, Sezimovo Ústí was incorporated into Tábor, which lasted until 30 June 1945.

== Demographics ==
Historical population

Year	Pop.	±%
1869	946	—
1880	1,035	+9.4%
1890	1,041	+0.6%
1900	1,170	+12.4%
1910	1,214	+3.8%

Year	Pop.	±%
1921	1,192	−1.8%
1930	1,077	−9.6%
1950	3,990	+270.5%
1961	5,849	+46.6%
1970	8,022	+37.2%

Year	Pop.	±%
1980	8,885	+10.8%
1991	7,520	−15.4%
2001	7,495	−0.3%
2011	7,254	−3.2%
2021	6,868	−5.3%

Source: Censuses

== Economy ==
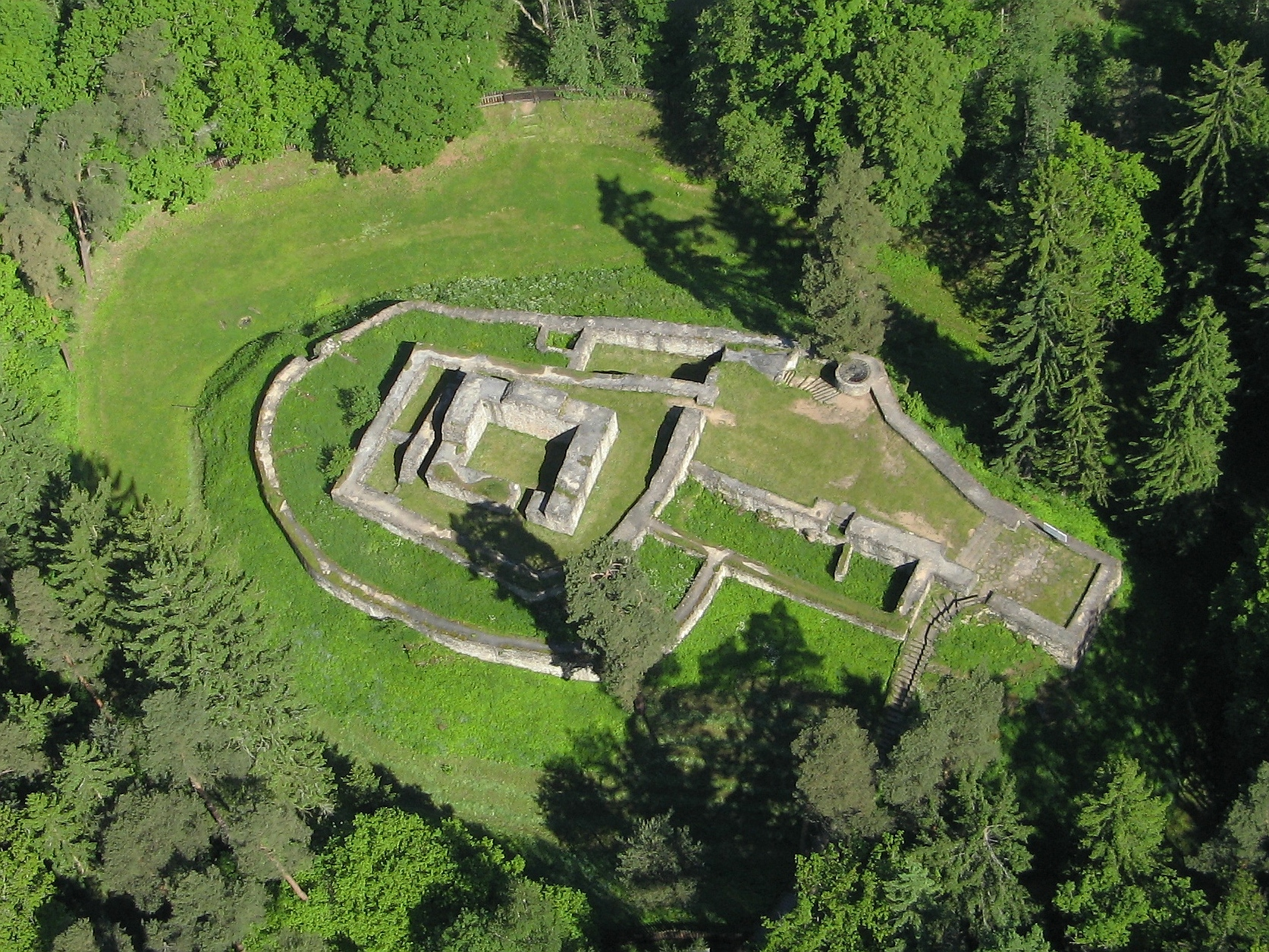
Ruin of the Kozí hrádek Castle

The largest employer based in Sezimovo Ústí is Kovosvit MAS Machine Tools, a manufacturer of machine tools with more than 250 employees.

== Transport ==
The D3 motorway (part of the European route E55) from Tábor to České Budějovice runs next to the town.

Sezimovo Ústí is located on the railway line Prague–České Budějovice.

== Sport ==
The main sport clubs in Sezimovo Ústí are TJ Spartak MAS Sezimovo Ústí and TJ Sokol Sezimovo Ústí. Until the end of 2011, the football club FK Spartak MAS Sezimovo Ústí played in the second tier of the Czech football system. In 2012, they fusioned with FK Tábor from neighbouring Tábor to form the club FC MAS Táborsko, which now plays in Tábor.

== Sights ==
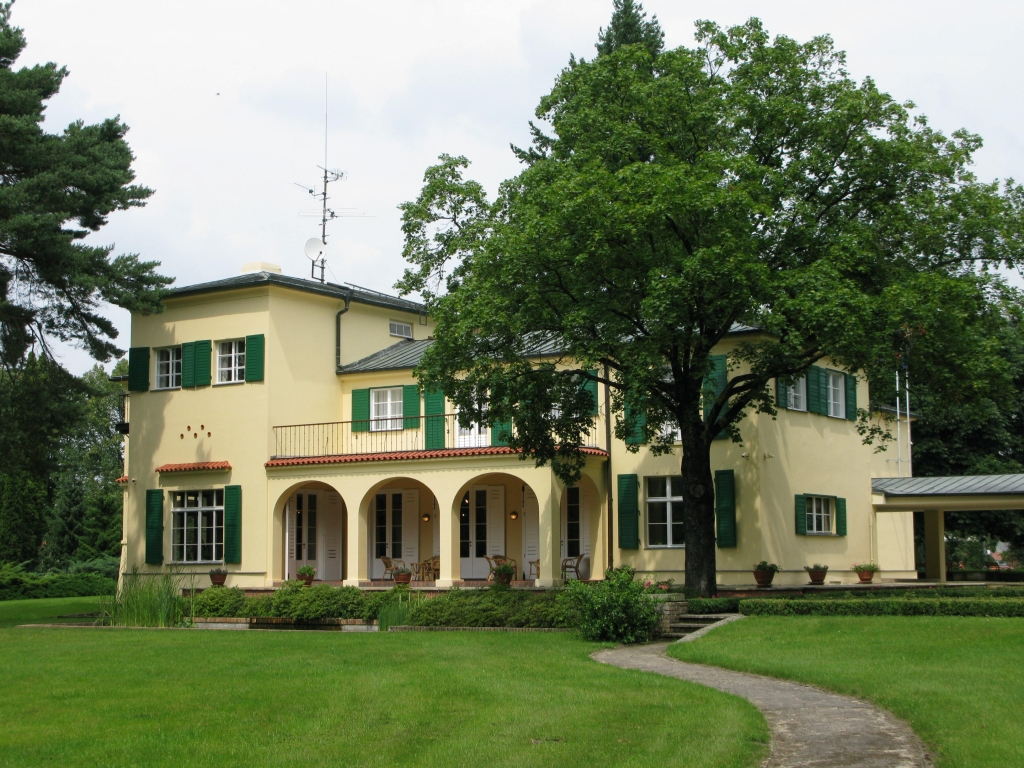
The villa of Edvard Beneš

Kozí hrádek is a castle ruin near Sezimovo Ústí, known for activities of Jan Hus. It is unknown when it was built, but it was first mentioned in 1377. It was built in Gothic style. In 1438, it was burnt down. The castle is protected as a national cultural monument. The ruins are accessible to the public.

The villa of Czechoslovak president Edvard Beneš in Sezimovo Ústí was his favourite place of recreation, and the site of his burial. The villa's garden with the grave is open to the public. The villa itself is open only partially as it is still used by the Government of the Czech Republic. There is also the monument with an exposition of political and social life of E. Beneš and his wife.

The Church of Exaltation of the Holy Cross was built in the late Empire style in 1841. In the park near the town hall there is a stone baptismal font and few stone fragments as the only remains from the original town which stood here until 1420.

== Notable people ==
- Jan Hus (1371–1415), theologian, philosopher and reformer; preached here
- Edvard Beneš (1884–1948), politician, President of Czechoslovakia; died here
- Václav Kaplický (1895–1982), writer, journalist and poet
- František Němec (born 1943), actor
- Bohumil Cepák (1951–2021), handball player

== International relations ==
Sezimovo Ústí is a part of the Commonwealth of Towns with Hussite Past and Tradition, along with other eleven Czech and six German municipalities.

=== Twin towns – sister cities ===
Sezimovo Ústí is twinned with:

- Thierachern, Switzerland
