= Bohumil Cepák =

Czech handball player (1951–2021)

Personal information
- Nationality: Czech (Czechoslovakia)
- Born: 9 July 1943 Sezimovo Ústí, Protectorate of Bohemia and Moravia
- Died: 4 July 2021 (aged 77)
- Height: 184 cm (72 in)

Sport
- Sport: Handball
- Position: Goalkeeper

Senior clubs
- Years: Team
- –: Dukla Prague
- –: TJ Gottwaldov
National team
- Years: Team
- –: Czechoslovakia

Bohumil Cepák (13 July 1951 – 4 September 2021) was a Czech handball player and coach.

In 1976 he was part of the Czechoslovak team which finished seventh in the Olympic tournament. He played all five matches.

He played most of his career at Dukla Prague, except for a period of military service, where he played for TJ Gottwaldov.

After his playing career, he became an assistant coach to the Czech youth national teams.
