= Kalle Järvinen =

Finnish shot putter

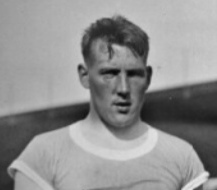
- Järvinen in 1929

Personal information
- Born: 27 March 1903 Jyväskylä, Finland
- Died: 25 August 1941 (aged 38) Koirinvaara, Suojärvi District, Soviet Union

Sport
- Sport: Athletics
- Event: Shot put

Kalle Järvinen (27 March 1903 – 25 August 1941) was a Finnish athlete. He competed in the men's shot put at the 1932 Summer Olympics. In 1941, while serving in World War II, Järvinen was shot and killed by a fellow soldier during a fight. Both men were drunk at the time. The soldier was later court-martialed for killing Järvinen and sentenced to 8 years in prison.
