= Planá nad Lužnicí =

- Town
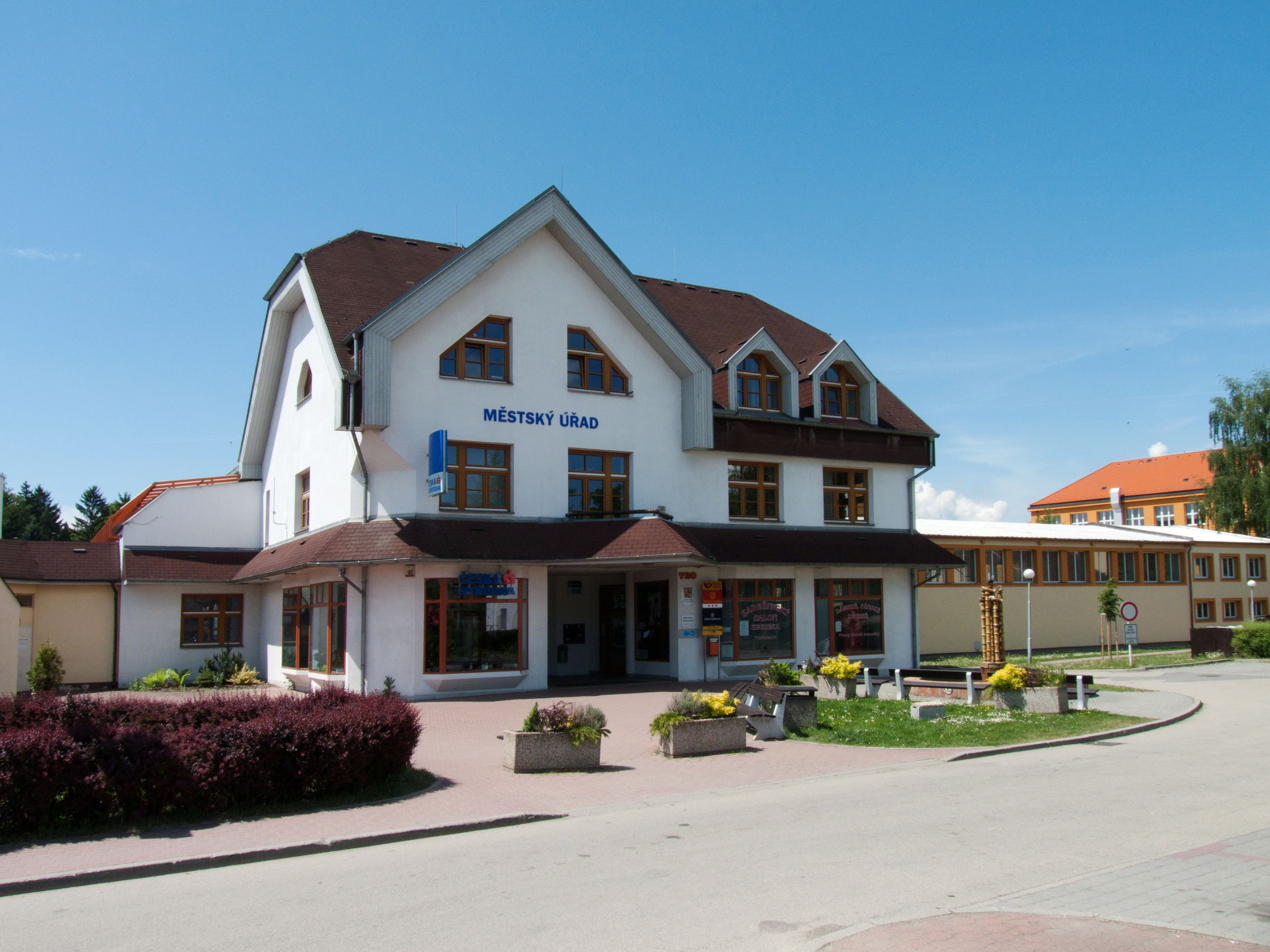
- Town hall

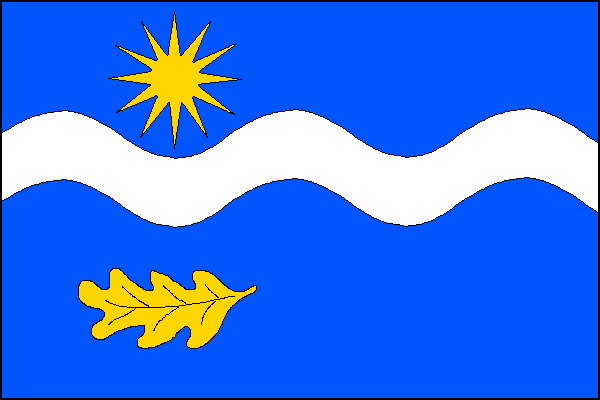
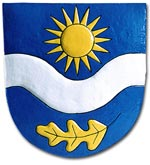
- Flag Coat of arms

- Location in the Czech Republic
- Coordinates: 49°21′16″N 14°42′5″E
- Country: Czech Republic
- Region: South Bohemian
- District: Tábor
- First mentioned: 1288

Government
  - Mayor: Jiří Rangl

Area
  - Total: 21.42 km^{2} (8.27 sq mi)
- Elevation: 395 m (1,296 ft)

Population (2026-01-01)
  - Total: 4,604
  - Density: 214.9/km^{2} (556.7/sq mi)
- Time zone: UTC+1 (CET)
  - Summer (DST): UTC+2 (CEST)
- Postal code: 391 11
- Website: www.plananl.cz

Planá nad Lužnicí (Czech pronunciation: [ˈplanaː ˈnad luʒɲɪtsiː]; German: Plan an der Lainsitz) is a town in Tábor District in the South Bohemian Region of the Czech Republic. It has about 4,600 inhabitants. The town is located on the Lužnice River in the Tábor Uplands.

Planá nad Lužnicí is known as an industrial town, associated with the dairy industry and the production of plastics.

== Administrative division ==
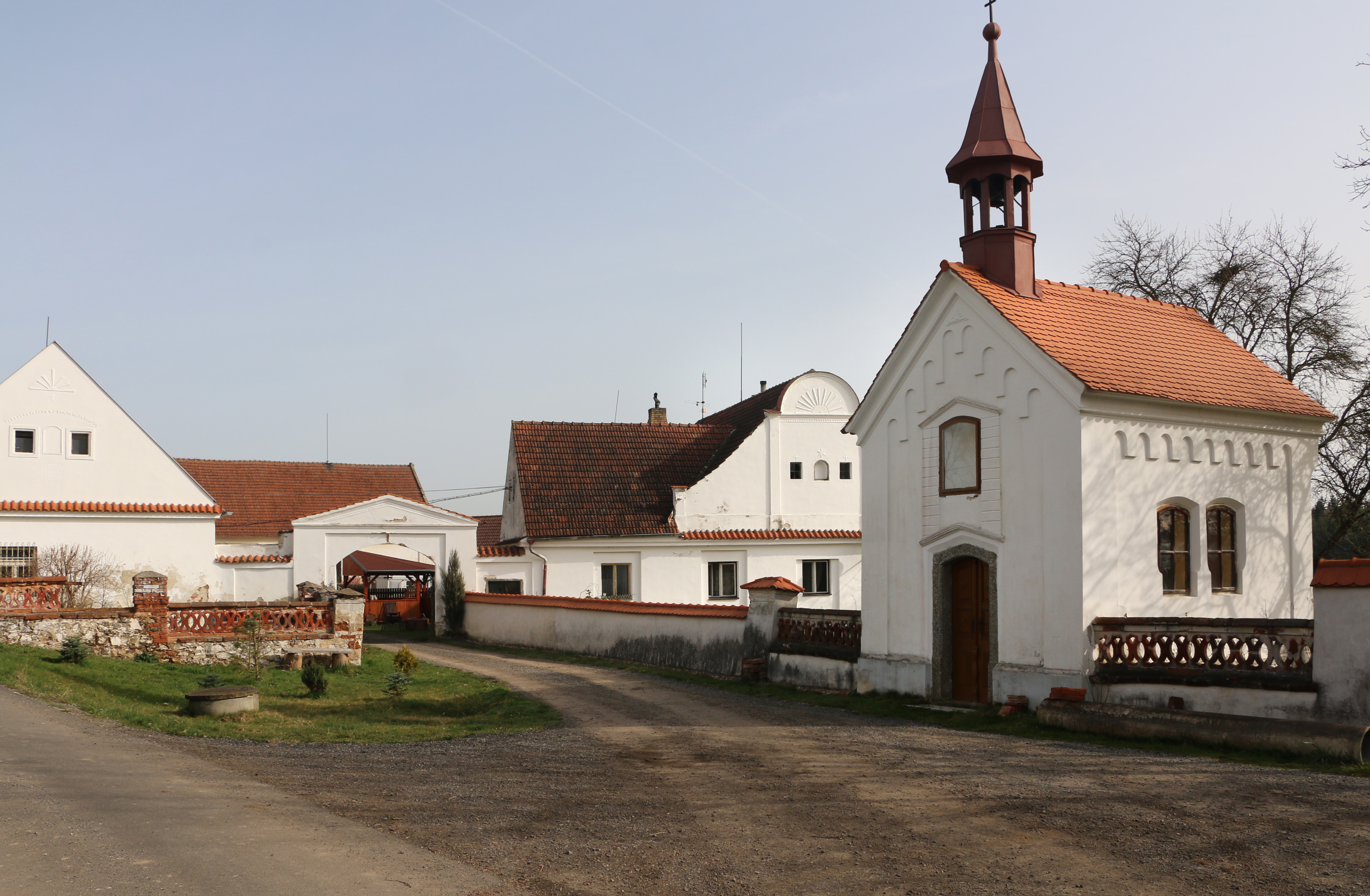
Centre of Lhota Samoty

Planá nad Lužnicí consists of three municipal parts (in brackets population according to the 2021 census):

- Planá nad Lužnicí (3,012)
- Lhota Samoty (169)
- Strkov (1,053)

== Etymology ==
The Czech word planá meant 'barren', but it also denoted a wide, open landscape.

== Geography ==
Planá nad Lužnicí is urbanistically fused with the neighbouring town of Sezimovo Ústí in the north. It is located about 6 kilometres (4 mi) south of Tábor. It lies in the Tábor Uplands. The highest point is the flat hill Holeček at 431 m (1,414 ft) above sea level. The Lužnice River flows through the town. There are several fishponds in the municipal territory.

== History ==
Planá nad Lužnicí was first mentioned in a letter of bishop Tobiáš of Bechyně from 1288 or 1289, when it was part of the Prague episcopacy. From the time Oldřich of Ústí came to power until 1547, Planá was a dependency of the newly established Hussite town of Tábor. Then the town was bought by William of Rosenberg, who had a wooden bridge over the Lužnice river built. The estate was then inherited by Peter Vok of Rosenberg. At the end of the 17th century, it was taken over by the Sternbergs and later by the Lobkowicz family.

After 1848, Planá became an independent municipality, which developed also thanks to the construction of the railway line in 1869 and thanks to timber rafting, which ran here until 1946.

== Demographics ==
Historical population

Year	Pop.	±%
1869	1,142	—
1880	985	−13.7%
1890	1,052	+6.8%
1900	1,063	+1.0%
1910	1,190	+11.9%

Year	Pop.	±%
1921	1,278	+7.4%
1930	1,454	+13.8%
1950	1,649	+13.4%
1961	2,123	+28.7%
1970	2,325	+9.5%

Year	Pop.	±%
1980	3,078	+32.4%
1991	2,901	−5.8%
2001	3,043	+4.9%
2011	3,844	+26.3%
2021	4,234	+10.1%

Source: Censuses

== Economy ==
A production plant of Madeta, the largest dairy in the country, has been located here since 1969. It is the largest plant for natural cheeses in the country.

The largest employer with its headquarters in Planá nad Lužnicí is Silon. The company was originally founded as a polyamide filament yarn producer in 1950. Later it focused on silon production (improved nylon for women's stockings invented by Otto Wichterle). Today it is a producer of polyolefin based performance compounds and polyester fibres.

== Transport ==
The D3 motorway (part of the European route E55) from Tábor to České Budějovice runs alongside the town.

Planá nad Lužnicí is located on the Prague–České Budějovice railway line.

== Sights ==
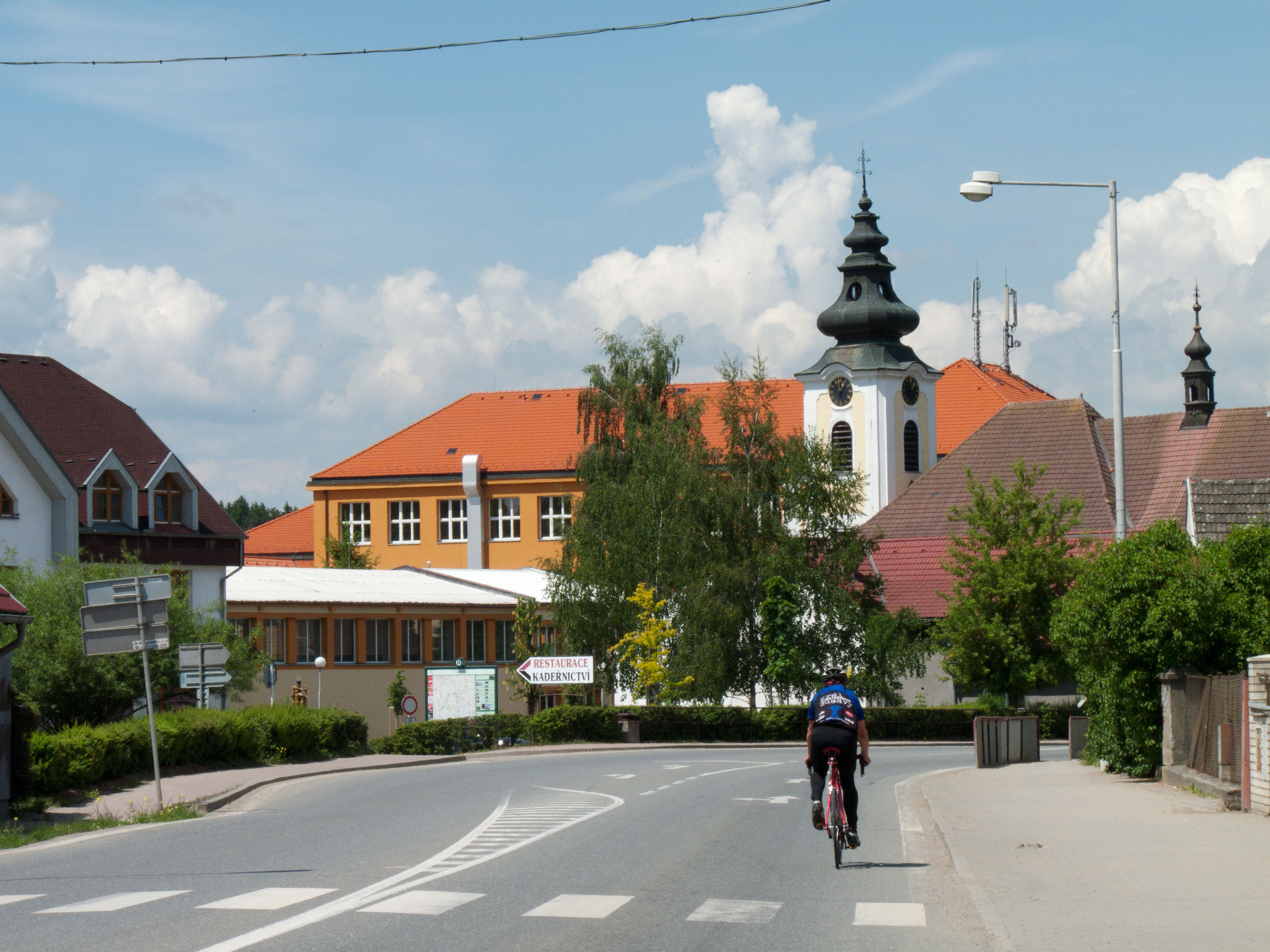
Church of Saint Wenceslaus

The Church of Saint Wenceslaus was originally a Gothic building, rebuilt in 1666. Another reconstruction took place in 1796, when the tower was built. There is a sundial on the wall of the church.

Architecturally valuable is the rectory from 1784 with bossed corners and a covered mansard roof.

Strkov Castle was built in 1903. Today it is privately owned. It has a castle park on the shore of the fishpond Strkovský rybník.

== Notable people ==
- František Douda (1908–1990), shot putter, Olympic medalist

== Twin towns – sister cities ==
Planá nad Lužnicí is twinned with:

- Gorenja Vas–Poljane, Slovenia
- Hluk, Czech Republic
