= Leo Sexton =

American shot putter

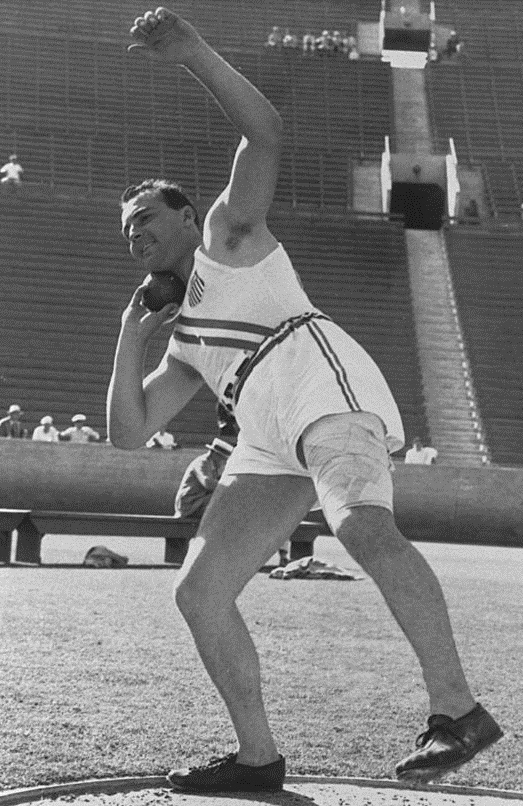
- Sexton at the 1932 Olympics

Personal information
- Born: August 27, 1909 Danvers, Massachusetts, United States
- Died: September 6, 1968 (aged 59) Perry, Oklahoma, United States
- Education: Georgetown University
- Height: 1.93 m (6 ft 4 in)
- Weight: 108 kg (238 lb)

Sport
- Sport: Athletics
- Event: Shot put
- Club: NYAC, New York

Achievements and titles
- Personal best: 16.16 m (1932)
Medal record
Representing the United States
Olympic Games
Gold medal – first place	1932 Los Angeles	Shot put

Leo Joseph Sexton (August 27, 1909 – September 6, 1968) was an American shot putter who won a gold medal at the 1932 Summer Olympics. Sexton was the world record holder for nearly a month in 1932. Despite his large frame (1.93 m, 108 kg), he cleared 1.96 m in the high jump in 1929. After retiring from sports he worked in insurance, becoming vice-president of a company in Perry, Oklahoma.

Records
Preceded by Emil Hirschfeld	Shot put world record holder August 27, 1932 – September 24, 1932	Succeeded by František Douda
