= Rolando Mendoza =

Nicaraguan shot putter

Personal information
- Nationality: Nicaraguan
- Born: 7 June 1939 (age 86)

Sport
- Sport: Athletics
- Event(s): Shot put Discus

Rolando Mendoza (born 7 June 1939) is a Nicaraguan athlete. He competed in the men's shot put and the men's discus throw at the 1968 Summer Olympics.
