= Alexandru Fritz =

Romanian shot putter

Personal information
- Nationality: Romanian
- Born: 17 April 1905 Arad, Austria-Hungary
- Died: 3 August 1972 (aged 67) Arad, Romania

Sport
- Sport: Athletics
- Event: Shot put

Alexandru Fritz (17 April 1905 – 3 August 1972) was a Romanian athlete. He competed in the men's shot put at the 1928 Summer Olympics.
