= George Woods (shot putter) =

American shot putter (1943–2022)

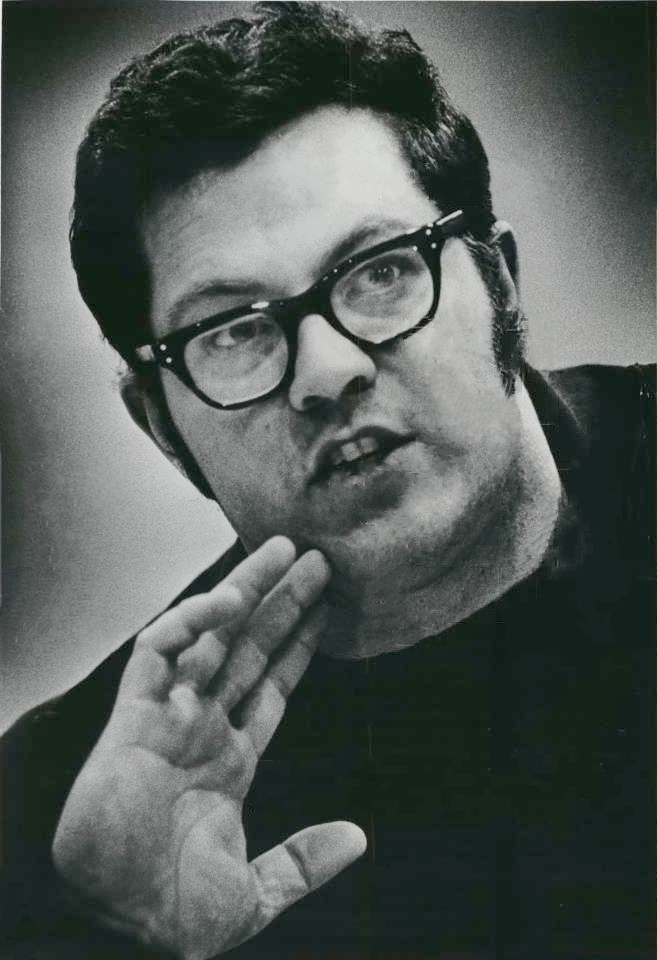
- Woods in 1973

Personal information
- Born: February 11, 1943 Portageville, Missouri, U.S.
- Died: August 30, 2022 (aged 79)
- Height: 6 ft 2 in (188 cm)
- Weight: 300 lb (136 kg)

Sport
- Sport: Athletics
- Events: Shot put, discus throw
- Club: Pacific Coast Club, Long Beach

Achievements and titles
- Personal bests: SP – 22.02 m (1974); DT – 55.32 m (1968)
Medal record
Men's athletics
Representing United States
Olympic Games
Silver medal – second place	1968 Mexico City	Shot put
Silver medal – second place	1972 Munich	Shot put

George Woods (February 11, 1943 – August 30, 2022) was an American athlete who mainly competed in the shot put. Born in Portageville, Missouri, he moved to Sikeston, Missouri, as a baby. As a senior at Sikeston High School, Woods became the first Missouri high school athlete to top 60 ft (18.3 m), setting a Sikeston school record that still stands to this day. He would go on to attend Southern Illinois University.

Woods competed at the 1968, 1972 and 1976 Olympics. After winning the US Olympic track and field team trails in 1968, he was overtaken by fellow American shot putter Randy Matson (Texas A&M Aggies) in the Mexico City games, settling for the silver medal behind Matson’s Olympic record performance. Four years later in 1972, he again entered the games as the American Olympic trials champion and the favorite for Olympic gold. He came close, but was again denied Olympic gold. Wladyslaw Komar, a virtual unknown from Poland, set an Olympic record at 21.18 m (69 ft 5¾ in) on his first throw. Woods responded, steadily and methodically, reaching 21.17 m (69 ft 5½ inches) in the fourth round. While Komar never approached his opening effort throughout the series, Woods couldn’t pick up the final centimeter on his remaining throws. He would settle for another silver medal. Woods would win the U.S. trials again in 1976, but finish seventh at the Olympics.

Woods had a great indoor career, winning national championships in 1967–1969 and 1973. His 1973 meet record of 69 ft 9½ in stood as the meet record for 20 years. A year later in 1974, Woods set the indoor world record at 22.02 m (72 ft 3 in), a mark that stood for 11 years.

Woods was inducted to the USATF National Track and Field Hall of Fame in 2007.
