= Uwe Grabe =

German shot putter

Personal information
- Nationality: German
- Born: 15 October 1942 (age 83) Brandenburg, Germany
- Height: 192 cm (6 ft 4 in)
- Weight: 112 kg (247 lb)

Sport
- Sport: Athletics
- Event: Shot put
- Retired: 1972

Achievements and titles
- Personal best: 20.50 (1972)
Medal record
Representing East Germany
Summer Universiade
Bronze medal – third place	1970 Turin	Shot put

Uwe Grabe (born 15 October 1942) is a German athlete. He competed in the men's shot put at the 1968 Summer Olympics in Mexico City and finished seventh, he then won a bronze medal at the Summer Universiade two years later.

== Personal life ==
In 1972, Grabe retired due to a shoulder injury and went on to get educated in civil engineering and worked for the town of Cottbus, Brandenburg, Germany, in the construction office.

After German reunification, he constructed the building engineering office in Cottbus, Brandenburg, and then became the technical inspector for the animal park in Cottbus.
