= Nelson Gray =

American shot putter

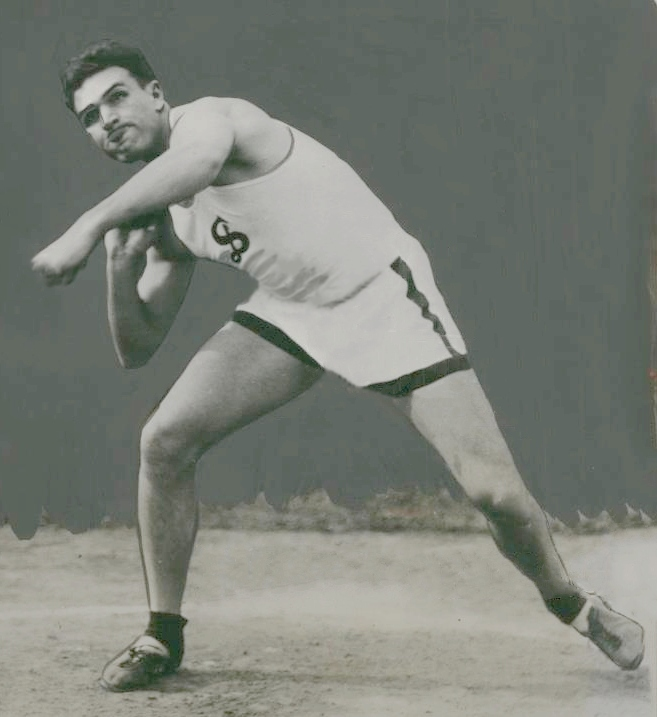
- Gray in 1931

Personal information
- Nationality: American
- Born: May 20, 1911 Upland, California, U.S.
- Died: October 10, 1982 (aged 71) Upland, California, U.S.
- Height: 186 cm (6 ft 1 in)
- Weight: 100 kg (220 lb)

Sport
- Sport: Athletics
- Events: Shot put, discus throw
- Club: Olympic Club, San Francisco

Achievements and titles
- Personal bests: SP – 15.84 m (1932); DT – 46.45 m (1933)

Nelson Alexander Gray (May 20, 1911 – October 10, 1982) was an American weight thrower. He had his best achievements in the shot put, in 1932, when he placed second at the AAU championships and fifth at the Summer Olympics; that year he was ranked eighth in the world. Gray lived most of his life in Upland, California, and owned a citrus grove there.
