= Athletics at the 1968 Summer Olympics – Men's shot put =

Men's shot put at the Games of the XIX Olympiad
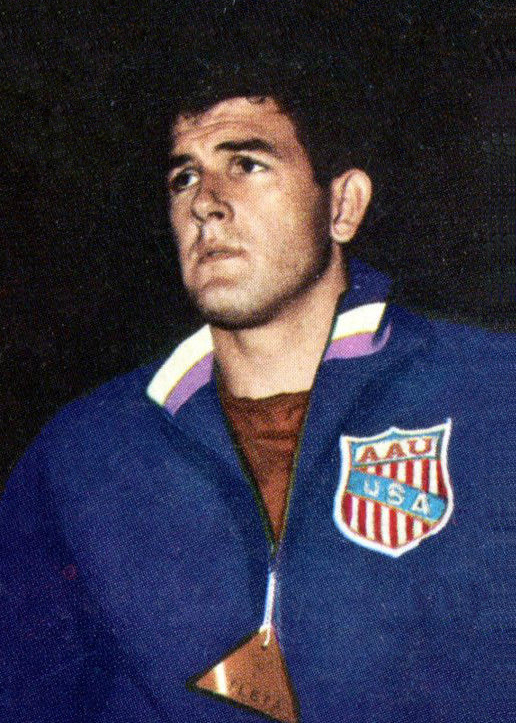
- Randy Matson
- Venue: Estadio Olímpico Universitario
- Dates: October 13–14, 1968
- Competitors: 19 from 14 nations
- Winning distance: 20.54

Medalists
1st place, gold medalist(s)		Randy Matson	United States
2nd place, silver medalist(s)		George Woods	United States
3rd place, bronze medalist(s)		Eduard Gushchin	Soviet Union

The men's shot put competition at the 1968 Summer Olympics in Mexico City, Mexico took place on October 13–14. Nineteen athletes from 14 nations competed. The maximum number of athletes per nation had been set at 3 since the 1930 Olympic Congress. The event was wo by Randy Matson of the United States, the nation's sixth consecutive and 14th overall victory in the men's shot put. His teammate George Woods took silver, making 1968 the sixth straight Games the Americans had finished one-two. Matson was the seventh man to win two medals in the event (adding to his 1964 silver); Woods would become the eighth in 1972. Eduard Gushchin took bronze, the Soviet Union's first men's shot put medal.

== Background ==
This was the 16th appearance of the event, which is one of 12 athletics events to have been held at every Summer Olympics. Returning finalists from the 1964 Games were silver medalist Randy Matson of the United States, bronze medalist Vilmos Varju of Hungary, seventh-place finisher Les Mills of New Zealand, ninth-place finisher Władysław Komar of Poland, and twelfth-place finisher Dieter Hoffmann of the United Team of Germany (now competing for East Germany). Matson had been the best shot putter in the world since the 1964 Games, breaking the world record twice.

El Salvador and Nicaragua each made their debut in the men's shot put; East Germany and West Germany competed separately for the first time. The United States appeared for the 16th time, the only nation to have competed in all Olympic shot put competitions to date.

== Competition format ==
The competition consisted of two rounds, qualification and final. Each athlete received three throws in the qualifying round. All who achieved the qualifying distance of 18.90 metres progressed to the final. If fewer than twelve athletes achieved this mark, then the twelve furthest throwing athletes reached the final. Each finalist was allowed three throws in last round, with the top eight athletes after that point being given three further attempts.

== Records ==
Prior to the competition, the existing world and Olympic records were as follows.

World record	Randy Matson (USA)	21.78	College Station, United States	23 April 1967
Olympic record	Dallas Long (USA)	20.33	Tokyo, Japan	17 October 1964

Randy Matson broke the Olympic record with a throw of 20.68 metres in the qualifying round. Nobody, including Matson, was able to surpass that mark in the final.

== Schedule ==
All times are Central Standard Time (UTC-6)

Date	Time	Round
Sunday, 13 October 1968	10:00	Qualifying
Monday, 14 October 1968	15:30	Final

== Results ==
=== Qualifying round ===
Qual. rule: qualification standard 18.90m (Q) or at least best 12 qualified (q).

Rank	Group	Athlete	Nation	1	2	3	Distance	Notes
1	A	Randy Matson	United States	20.68	—	—	20.68	Q, OR
2	A	Eduard Gushchin	Soviet Union	19.88	—	—	19.88	Q
3	A	George Woods	United States	19.79	—	—	19.79	Q
4	A	Dieter Hoffmann	East Germany	18.30	19.75	—	19.75	Q
5	B	Pierre Colnard	France	19.57	—	—	19.57	Q
6	A	Heinfried Birlenbach	West Germany	19.43	—	—	19.43	Q
7	A	Dave Maggard	United States	18.73	19.26	—	19.26	Q
8	A	Uwe Grabe	East Germany	18.08	18.59	19.15	19.15	Q
9	A	Władysław Komar	Poland	19.09	—	—	19.09	Q
10	A	Traugott Glöckler	West Germany	18.89	19.08	—	19.08	Q
11	B	Les Mills	New Zealand	18.56	19.00	—	19.00	Q
12	B	Jeff Teale	Great Britain	18.76	X	18.87	18.87	q
13	A	Vilmos Varjú	Hungary	18.69	X	18.86	18.86	
14	B	Arnjolt Beer	France	18.72	X	X	18.72	
15	B	Edy Hubacher	Switzerland	18.54	18.38	X	18.54	
16	B	Guðmundur Hermannsson	Iceland	16.24	16.77	17.35	17.35	
17	B	Georgios Lemonis	Greece	16.43	X	X	16.43	
18	B	Rolando Mendoza	Nicaragua	11.39	13.33	13.32	13.33	
19	B	Mauricio Jubis	El Salvador	12.04	12.46	12.92	12.92	
—	B	Lahcen Samsam Akka	Morocco	DNS				
—	B	Ricky Bruch	Sweden	DNS				
—	B	Jalal Keshmiri	Iran	DNS				
—	A	Dieter Prollius	East Germany	DNS				
—	A	George Puce	Canada	DNS				

=== Final ===
Rank	Athlete	Nation	1	2	3	4	5	6	Distance
1st place, gold medalist(s)	Randy Matson	United States	20.54	20.09	18.67	20.15	20.02	20.18	20.54
2nd place, silver medalist(s)	George Woods	United States	20.12	X	X	–	19.19	X	20.12
3rd place, bronze medalist(s)	Eduard Gushchin	Soviet Union	20.09	19.45	19.69	X	X	19.41	20.09
4	Dieter Hoffmann	East Germany	20.00	19.33	19.75	19.68	19.85	19.86	20.00
5	Dave Maggard	United States	19.43	19.33	19.75	19.68	19.85	19.86	19.43
6	Władysław Komar	Poland	18.66	19.28	18.54	X	X	19.21	19.28
7	Uwe Grabe	East Germany	18.20	18.74	19.03	17.43	17.66	18.34	19.03
8	Heinfried Birlenbach	West Germany	18.80	18.48	X	18.13	18.67	X	18.80
9	Pierre Colnard	France	18.62	X	18.79	Did not advance			18.79
10	Jeff Teale	Great Britain	18.65	18.57	18.60	Did not advance			18.65
11	Les Mills	New Zealand	18.18	18.01	17.95	Did not advance			18.18
12	Traugott Glöckler	West Germany	X	17.20	18.14	Did not advance			18.14
