= John Lyman (athlete) =

American shot putter and discus thrower

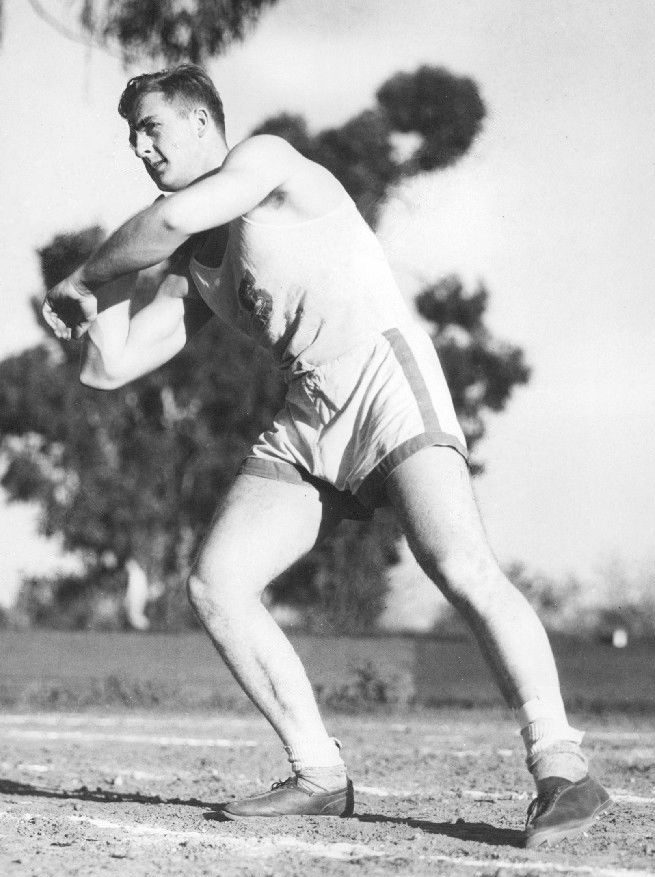
- Lyman in 1936

Personal information
- Born: March 19, 1912
- Died: July 29, 1989 (aged 77)

Sport
- Sport: Athletics
- Events: Shot put, discus throw

Achievements and titles
- Personal best: SP – 16.70 m (1934)

John Carnahan Lyman (March 19, 1912 – July 29, 1989) was an American shot putter and discus thrower who briefly held the shot put world record in 1934.

== Sports career ==
Lyman studied at Stanford University and was one of many stand-out throwers coached by Dink Templeton. As a sophomore in 1932, he placed fourth in the shot at the United States Olympic Trials with a best throw of 15.30 m (50 ft 2 3/8 in), one place from qualifying for the Olympic team. In 1933 he won the IC4A shot put championship with a mark of 16.06 m (52 ft 8 1/2 in), the second-best put in the world that year behind Jack Torrance's 16.10 m. He placed third at the national championships that year, behind Torrance and Stanford teammate Gordon Dunn.

Lyman continued to improve in 1934. The ensuing rivalry between him and Torrance was one of the highlights of the American track and field season, together with the duels of milers Glenn Cunningham and Bill Bonthron. On March 30, 1934, Lyman set two unofficial world records with non-standard shots, throwing a 24-pound shot 12.38 m (40 ft 7 3/4 in) and an 8-pound shot 21.53 m (70 ft 7 3/4 in). On April 14 he reached 16.30 m (53 ft 6 in) with the standard 16-pound shot, breaking the official world record of František Douda and equaling an unratified mark set by Torrance the previous month. A week after that he improved to 16.48 m (54 ft 1 in) in Palo Alto, claiming the record fully for himself; unlike his previous record, this mark was officially ratified by the IAAF. Only six days later, however, Torrance threw 16.80 m (55 ft 1 1/2 in) at the Drake Relays in Des Moines, reclaiming the record.

While Lyman failed to regain the world record, he did successfully defend his IC4A title, improving his own meeting record to 16.22 m (53 ft 2 3/4 in) and beating Dunn. In addition, he placed second in the discus, losing only to Dunn; these doubles accounted for more than half of the 35 1/4.points Stanford scored in regaining the team title. Lyman and Torrance finally met head-to-head at the NCAA championships in Los Angeles. The competition consisted of a three-round qualification on June 22 and a three-round final on June 23, with results from the qualification carrying over. In the qualification Lyman broke Torrance's meeting record from the previous year, putting 16.35 m (53 ft 7 3/(4 in)) for the overnight lead. In the final, however, Torrance prevailed, reaching 16.62 m (54 ft 6 9/16 in) while Lyman failed to improve his qualification mark. Lyman scored his team another six points by placing third in the discus, behind Dunn and USC's Ken Carpenter, helping Stanford win the NCAA team title as well.

Torrance and Lyman then had a rematch at the national championships the following week. Torrance came out on top again with 16.89 m (55 ft 5 1/4 in), beating his own world record, while Lyman reached 16.70 m (54 ft 9 1/2 in) in placing second. That mark would remain Lyman's best in official competition, although he had thrown beyond 55 feet in practice. In the discus throw Lyman placed fourth, his best national finish in that event.

Lyman graduated from Stanford that year and his athletic career gradually started winding down. In 1935 he still placed third to Torrance and Dunn at the national championships and shared third place on the yearly world list, his best mark that year being 16.06 m. He was considered a likely 1936 Olympian; in the end, though, while he did join the American team, it was as an interpreter.

Records
Preceded by (Czechoslovakia) František Douda (United States) Jack Torrance (unofficial)	Men's Shot Put World Record Holder; April 21, 1934 – April 27, 1934	Succeeded by (United States) Jack Torrance
