= Randy Matson =

American track and field athlete

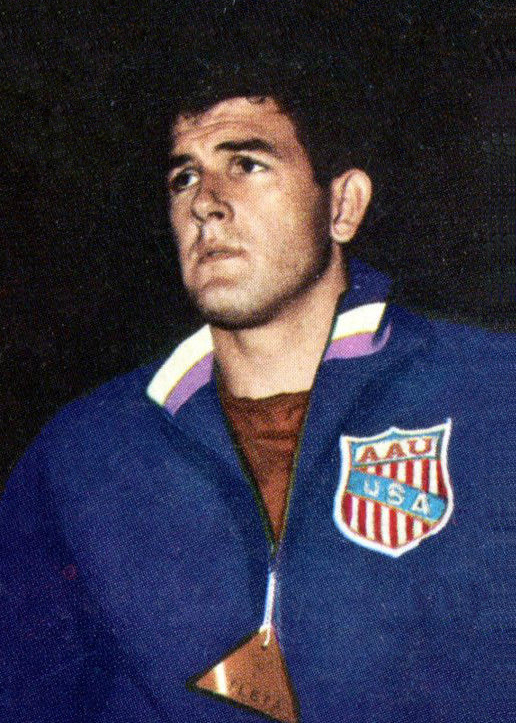
- Matson in 1968

Personal information
- Full name: James Randel Matson
- Born: March 5, 1945 (age 81) Kilgore, Texas, U.S.
- Height: 6 ft 7 in (201 cm)
- Weight: 265 lb (120 kg)

Sport
- Country: United States
- Sport: Athletics
- Events: Shot put, discus throw
- Club: Atletica Pistoia

Achievements and titles
- Personal bests: SP – 71–5½ (21.78 m, 1967); DT – 213–9 (65.15 m, 1967)
Medal record
Men's athletics
Representing the United States
Olympic Games
Gold medal – first place	1968 Mexico City	Shot put
Silver medal – second place	1964 Tokyo	Shot put
Pan American Games
Gold medal – first place	1967 Winnipeg	Shot put
Summer Universiade
Gold medal – first place	1965 Budapest	Shot put

James Randel "Randy" Matson (born March 5, 1945) is an American track and field athlete who mostly competed in the shot put. Matson won a silver medal at the 1964 and a gold medal at the 1968 Olympics.

== Early years ==
The son of Charles and Ellen Matson, Randy Matson was reared in Pampa, the seat of Gray County in the Texas Panhandle. At the age of twelve, he participated in his first track meet. He won the 50-yard dash, the 100-yard dash, the long jump and the high jump and finished sixth in the shot put. He attended Pampa High School, where he was a three-sport standout in American football, basketball, and track and field. He won All-District football honors, and was a two-time All-District and one-time All-State basketball player, averaging 15 points per game. In track and field, he was a two-time State Champion in both the shot put and the discus and could run the 100 yard dash in 10.2 seconds. This led him to be named an All-State and All-American in track and field. He was Track and Field News "High School Athlete of the Year" in 1963. Matson was also named Track and Field News' Men's Athlete of the Year in 1970.

== Amateur career ==
Matson is one of the greatest shot putters in the history of the sport, based predominantly on his one-meter improvement of the world record in 1965. He attended Texas A&M University, where he continued to work on his shot put skills, and in his first full year of using the heavier college (adult or Senior) shot (16 pounds), Matson won the Olympic silver medal in the 1964 Tokyo Olympics.

From 1965 through 1971, Matson entered 79 competitions, winning 73. During a two-month span in 1965 he broke the world record three times, adding over two feet to the previous mark, until it stood at 21.52 m (70 ft 7 in). During this time he had a considerable rivalry with Neal Steinhauer, but usually came out on top.

Matson earned his BBA in marketing from Texas A&M in 1967. He was selected in the 5th round (120th pick overall) by the Atlanta Falcons of the National Football League, and the 11th round (122nd overall) by the Seattle SuperSonics of the National Basketball Association. Matson turned down both opportunities to concentrate on track and field.

Matson improved his world record to 21.78 m (71 ft 5 in) in 1967, and was rewarded with the James E. Sullivan Award, given to the nation's outstanding amateur athlete. He earned the Olympic gold medal at the Mexico City Games in 1968, and was named the 1970 Track and Field News Athlete of the Year. He was on the June 1970 and January 1971 covers of Track and Field News.

In 1967 he threw the discus to within three inches (8 cm) of the (then) world record, and was briefly considered as a possible double Olympic champion in shot and discus—like Bud Houser in 1924—but Matson only competed in the shot in Mexico City. On that same day Matson put the shot over 70 feet three times and the discus over 200 feet three times.

He narrowly missed making the 1972 Olympic team when he finished fourth at the Olympic Trials. Matson retired after that contest as the only man who, up to that time, had ever put the shot over 70 feet. He was inducted into the Texas A&M Hall of Fame in 1972, the Texas Sports Hall of Fame in 1974, the National Sports Hall of Fame in 1981, the National Track and Field Hall of Fame in 1984, the National High School Sports Hall of Fame in 1988 and the Texas Track and Field Coaches Hall of Fame in 2012.

== Career highlights ==
- Personal Record: 21.78 m (71 ft 5 in)
- Olympic gold medal, 1968: 20.54 m (67 ft 5 in)
- Olympic silver medal, 1964: 20.20 m (66 ft 3 in)
- US National Champion in 1964, 1966, 1967, 1968, 1970, and 1972
- NCAA Shot Put Champion 1966 and 1967
- NCAA Discus Champion 1966 and 1967
- Broke Shot Put World Record four times – annual bests for those years:
  - 1965: 21.52 m (70 ft 7 in)
  - 1967: 21.78 m (71 ft 5 in)

== Post-retirement ==
Matson has dedicated his post-sports career to Texas A&M University. He joined The Association of Former Students in 1972, and served as their executive director from 1979 until his retirement in 1999; he was subsequently honored to be chosen the keynote speaker for the 2000 Aggie Muster held on the A&M campus.

In 2003, the Texas A&M Foundation created the post of Senior Philanthropic Officer for him. Once the foundation had completed its One Spirit One Vision fundraising campaign in 2007, far exceeding its goal, Matson announced his resignation. He had suffered from heart trouble in 2004 and wished to spend more time with his six young grandchildren.

Matson is married to the former Margaret Burns, a 1966 graduate of Abilene Christian University, where she served as a cheerleader. They have three children, Jessica, who is married to Russell Camp of Amarillo, Jim, and Cole, all of whom graduated from Texas A&M. Matson and his family live in College Station, Texas.

Records
Preceded by (United States) Dallas Long	Men's Shot Put World Record Holder; May 8, 1965 – May 5, 1973	Succeeded by (United States) Al Feuerbach
Awards
Preceded by (United States) Bill Toomey	Track & Field News Athlete of the Year; 1970	Succeeded by (United States) Rod Milburn
Preceded by Forrest Beaty	Track & Field News High School Boys Athlete of the Year; 1979	Succeeded by Gerry Lindgren
