= Georgios Lemonis =

Greek shot putter

Personal information
- Nationality: Greek
- Born: 12 April 1943 (age 83)

Sport
- Sport: Athletics
- Event: Shot put

Georgios Lemonis (born 12 April 1943) is a Greek athlete. He competed in the men's shot put at the 1968 Summer Olympics.
