= Emil Hirschfeld =

German shot and discus thrower

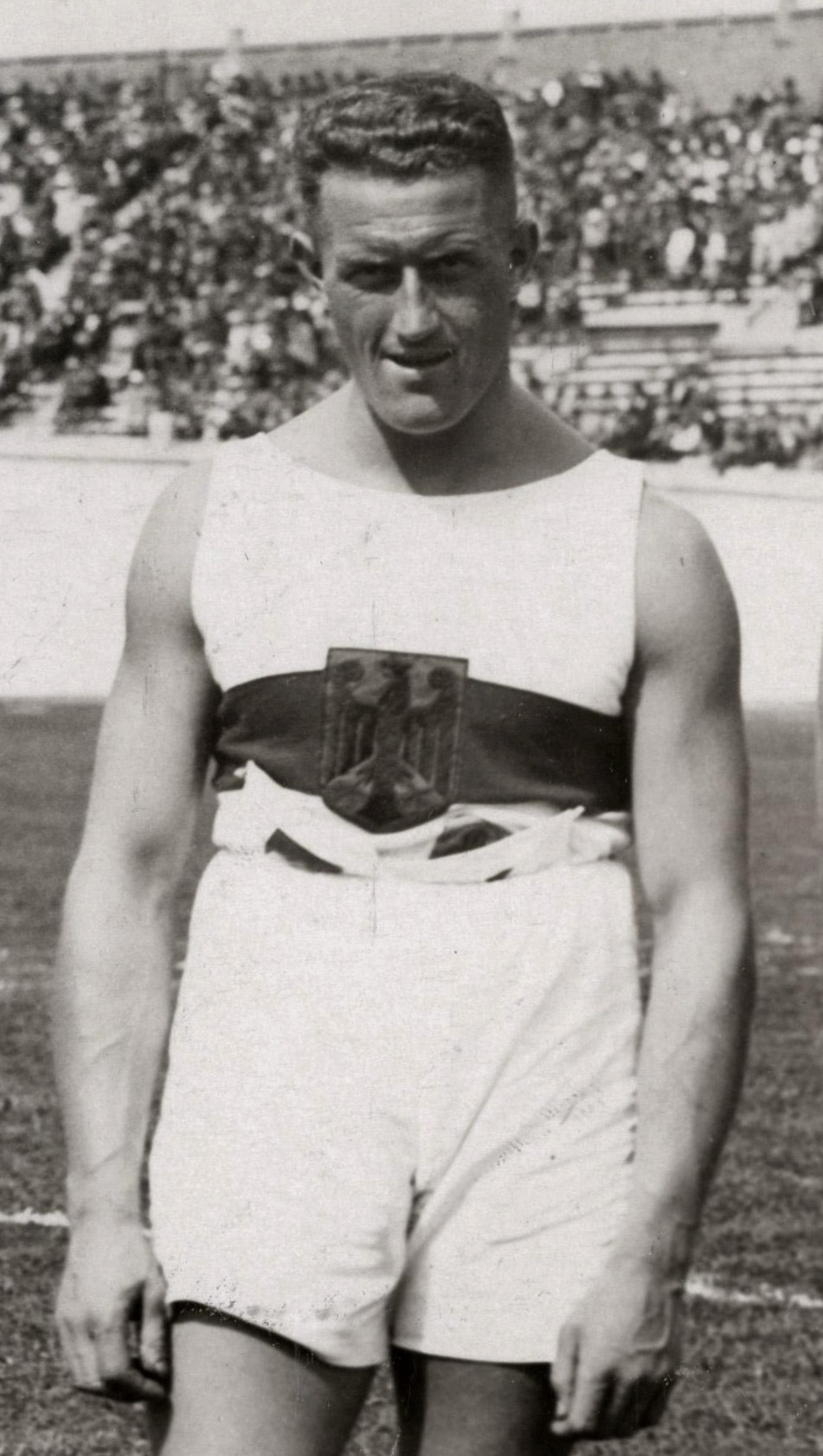
- Emil Hirschfeld at the 1928 Olympics

Personal information
- Born: 31 July 1903 Danzig, German Empire
- Died: 23 February 1968 (aged 64) East Berlin, East Germany
- Height: 1.88 m (6 ft 2 in)
- Weight: 100 kg (220 lb)

Sport
- Sport: Shot put, discus throw
- Club: Hindenburg Allenstein, Olsztyn
Medal record
Representing Germany
Olympic Games
Bronze medal – third place	1928 Amsterdam	Shot put

Emil Hirschfeld (31 July 1903 – 23 February 1968) was a German athlete who won a bronze medal in the shot put at the 1928 Olympics. The same year he set two world records in this event. At the 1932 Summer Olympics he finished fourth in the shot put and 14th in the discus throw.

Records
Preceded by (United States) Ralph Rose	Men's Shot Put World Record Holder; 6 May 1928 – 29 June 1928	Succeeded by (United States) John Kuck
Preceded by (United States) John Kuck	Men's Shot Put World Record Holder; 26 August 1928 – 27 August 1932	Succeeded by (United States) Leo Sexton
