= John Kuck =

American track and field athlete

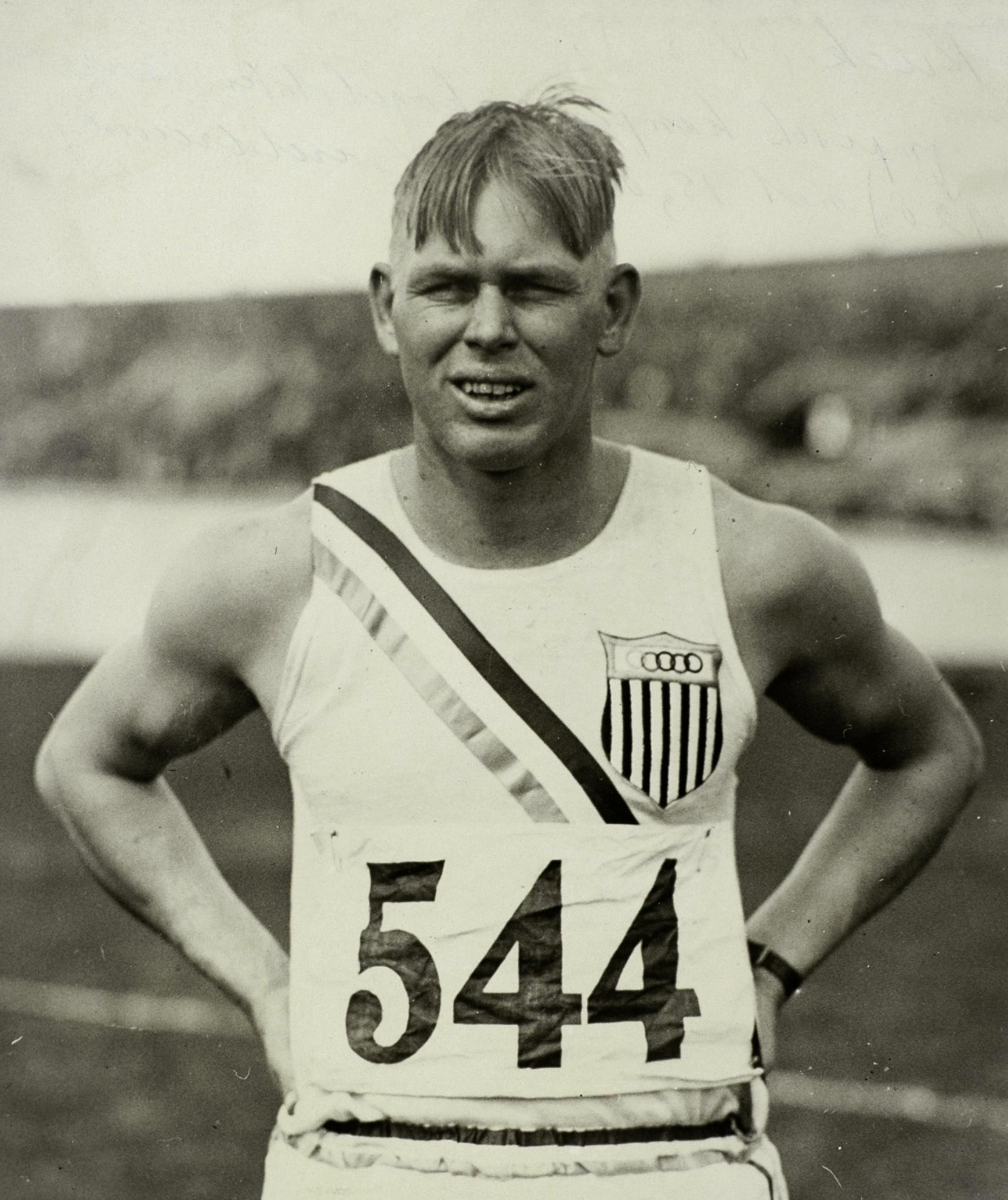
- Kuck at the 1928 Olympics

Personal information
- Full name: John Henry Kuck
- Born: April 27, 1905 Wilson, Kansas, United States
- Died: September 21, 1986 (aged 81) Halstead, Kansas, United States
- Height: 1.90 m (6 ft 3 in)
- Weight: 102 kg (225 lb)

Sport
- Sport: Athletics
- Events: Shot put, Javelin throw
- Club: LAAC, Los Angeles

Achievements and titles
- Olympic finals: 1928
Medal record
Men's athletics
Representing the United States
Olympic Games
Gold medal – first place	1928 Amsterdam	Shot put

John Henry Kuck (April 27, 1905 – September 21, 1986) was an American athlete who won a gold medal in the shot put at the 1928 Summer Olympics setting a new world record at 15.87 m. Earlier that year he set two more world records, but they were not recognized officially. In 1926 he also set a US record in the javelin throw at 65.28 m and won the AAU title.

Competing for the Emporia State Hornets track and field team, Kuck won an NCAA shot put title.

Records
Preceded by (Germany) Emil Hirschfeld	Men's Shot Put World Record Holder; June 29, 1928 – August 26, 1928	Succeeded by (Germany) Emil Hirschfeld
