= Zygmunt Heljasz =

Polish athletics competitor

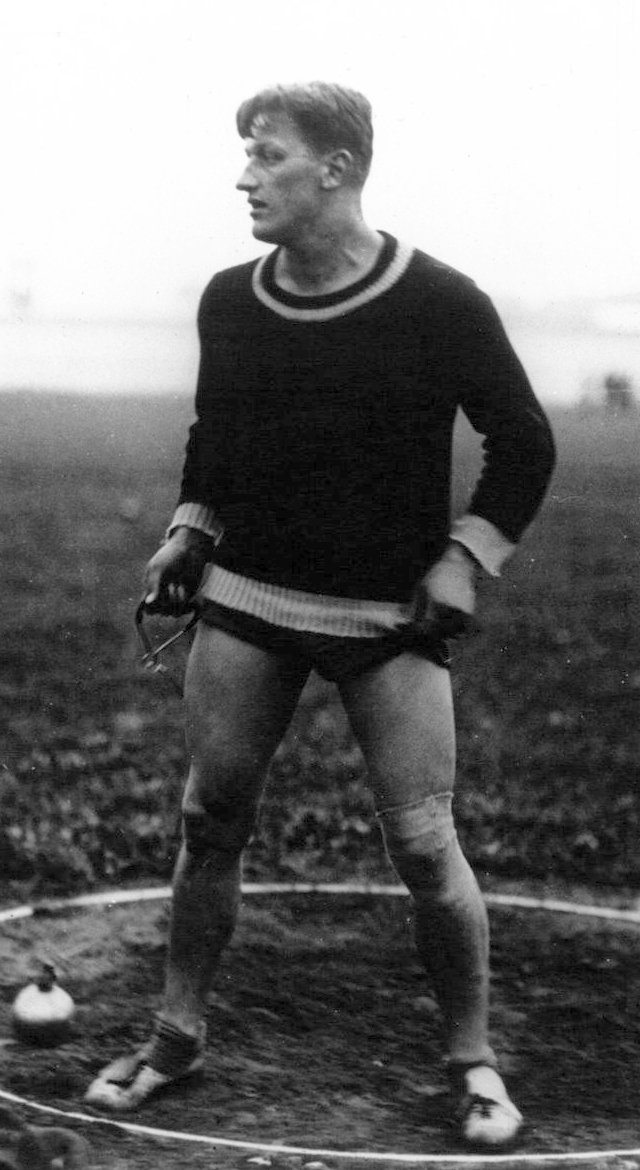
- Zygmunt Heljasz in 1932

Personal information
- Born: 21 September 1908 Posen, German Empire
- Died: 12 June 1963 (aged 54) Poznań, Poland
- Height: 188 cm (6 ft 2 in)
- Weight: 100 kg (220 lb)

Sport
- Sport: Athletics
- Events: Shot put, discus throw
- Club: Warta Poznań

Achievements and titles
- Personal bests: SP – 16.05 m (1932); DT – 47.09 m (1934)

Zygmunt Heljasz (21 September 1908 – 12 June 1963) was a Polish athlete who competed at the Olympic Games.

== Biography ==
Heljasz first trained in boxing and finished second at the national heavyweight championships. He changed to athletics in 1926 and in 1927 was included into the national team.

At the 1932 Summer Olympics, Heljasz competed in the shot put event and discus throw event, finishing in 7th and 13th place, respectively.

Heljasz won the British AAA Championships title in the shot put event at the British 1933 AAA Championships and the 1934 AAA Championships.

Heljasz placed 7th in the shot put at the 1934 European Athletics Championships. Heljasz was a multiple national champion in the shot put, discus throw and hammer throw.

In 1936, due to a conflict with the Polish Athletic Federation was excluded from the Olympic team and banned from competitions for one year. He turned to coaching, first in Brussels, Belgium, and then in Katowice. During World War II he was imprisoned in the Sachsenhausen and Gross-Rosen concentration camps. After the war he continued coaching athletics in Szczecin.
