= Harlow Rothert =

American shot putter (1908–1997)

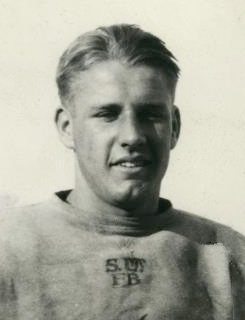
- Rothert in 1926

Personal information
- Full name: Harlow Phelps Rothert
- Born: April 1, 1908 Carthage, Missouri
- Died: August 13, 1997 (aged 89) Menlo Park, California
- Education: Stanford University
- Height: 190 cm (6 ft 3 in)
- Weight: 92 kg (203 lb)

Sport
- Country: United States
- Sport: Athletics
- Events: Shot put, discus throw, decathlon
- Club: LAAC, Los Angeles

Achievements and titles
- Personal bests: SP – 15.88 m (1930); DT – 46.83 m (1930); Dec – 7068 (1930)
Medal record
Men's athletics
Representing the United States
Olympic Games
Silver medal – second place	1932 Los Angeles	Shot put

Harlow Phelps Rothert (April 1, 1908 – August 13, 1997) was an American athlete who competed mainly in the shot put.

Rothert attended Stanford University, where he competed in basketball, football, and track and field. He was named first-team All-Pacific Coast Conference in basketball in 1929. He won the NCAA shot put title three times, and set a world record for the event in 1930. Rothert competed in the shot put at the 1928 and 1932 Summer Olympics. He won a silver medal in the 1932 games, held in Los Angeles, and placed seventh in 1928.

Rothert earned his bachelor's degree in 1930 and law degree in 1937, both from Stanford. He was a trial lawyer who specialized in civil law. He founded a law firm in San Francisco, and taught at Stanford Law School and Hastings College of Law. During World War II, he spent two years in the Marine Corps.

In 1996, he was part of the Olympic Torch Relay. Around that time he had an acute inflammation in his legs and had to practice every day to cover the targeted 2 km distance using a specially designed walker. He died in 1997, aged 89.
