= František Douda =

Czech shot putter

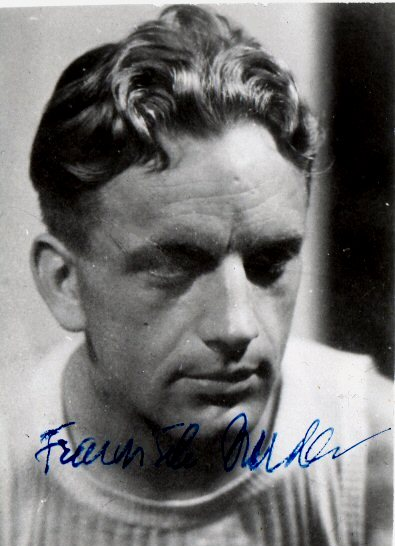

Personal information
- Born: 23 October 1908 Planá nad Lužnicí, Bohemia, Austria-Hungary
- Died: 15 January 1990 (aged 81) Prague, Czechoslovakia
- Height: 192 cm (6 ft 4 in)
- Weight: 96 kg (212 lb)

Sport
- Sport: Athletics
- Event: shot put
- Club: Slavia Prague
Medal record
Men's athletics
Representing Czechoslovakia
Olympic Games
Bronze medal – third place	1932 Los Angeles	Shot put
European Championships
Bronze medal – third place	1934 Turin	Shot put

František Douda (Czech pronunciation: [ˈfrancɪʃɛk ˈdouda]; 23 October 1908 – 15 January 1990) was a Czech shot putter who competed for Czechoslovakia at the 1932 Summer Olympics.

== Biography ==
Douda was born in Planá nad Lužnicí. He finished second behind József Darányi in the shot put event at the British 1931 AAA Championships.

He won an Olympic bronze medal at the 1932 Summer Olympics. In the same year he also set a world record with 16.20 metres on 24 September 1932 in Prague. The record stood until 21 April 1934, when American John Lyman improved it to 16.48 metres.

== International competitions ==
Year	Competition	Venue	Position	Notes
Representing Czechoslovakia
1928	Olympic Games	Amsterdam, Netherlands	20th	Discus throw
1932	Olympic Games	Los Angeles, United States	3rd	Shot put
1934	European Championships	Turin, Italy	3rd	Shot put
1936	Olympic Games	Berlin, Germany	7th	Shot put

Records
Preceded by Leo Sexton	Men's shot put world record holder 24 September 1932 – 21 April 1934	Succeeded by John Lyman
