= 1938 USA Outdoor Track and Field Championships =

American athletics championship event

- Dates: 2–3 July (men); 4 August (women)
- Host city: Buffalo, New York (men); Naugatuck, Connecticut (women)
- Venue: Civic Stadium (men); Recreation Field (women)
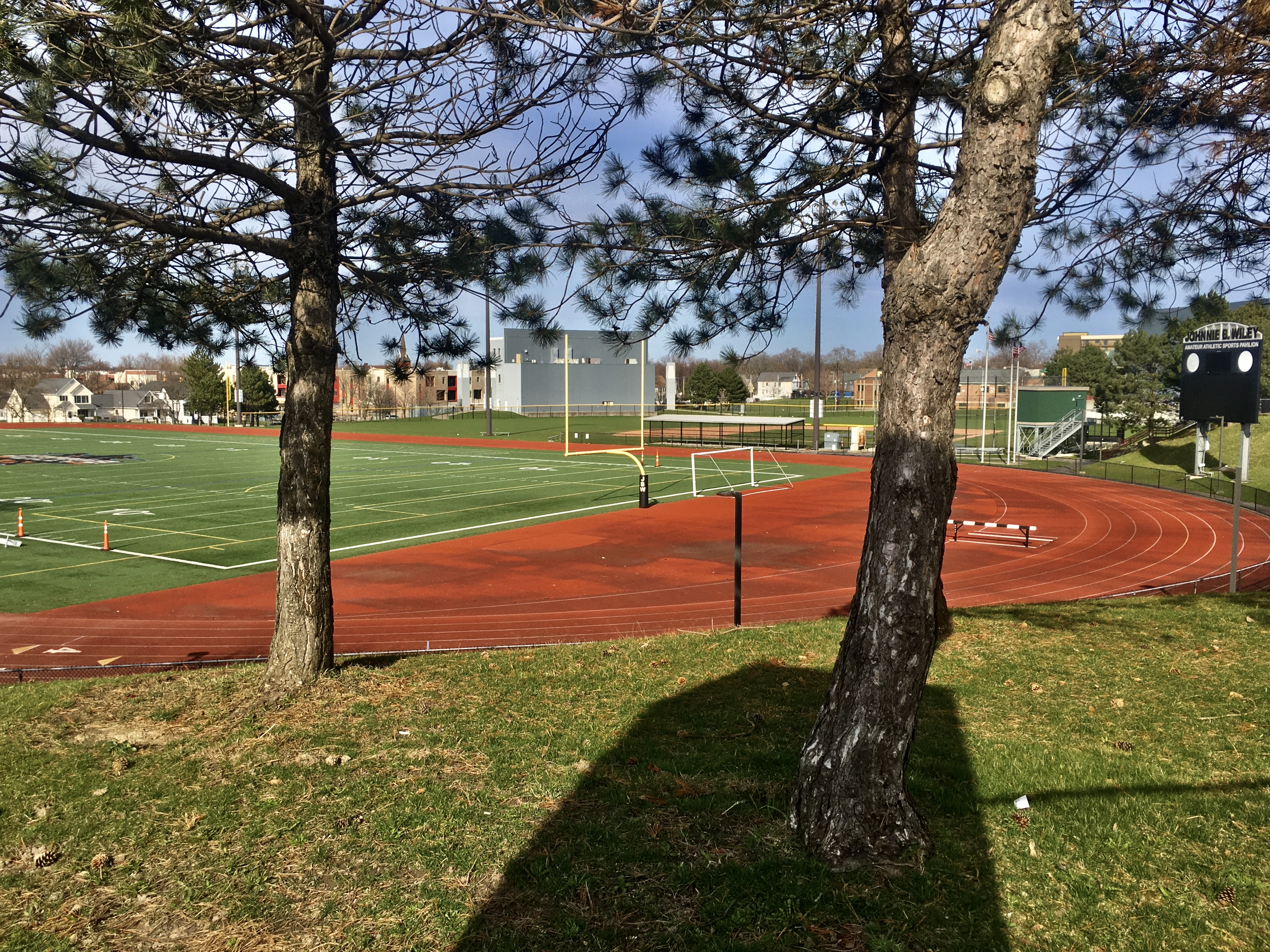

The 1938 USA Outdoor Track and Field Championships were organized by the Amateur Athletic Union (AAU) and served as the national championships in outdoor track and field for the United States.

The men's edition was held at Civic Stadium in Buffalo, New York, and it took place 2–3 July (the men's 10,000 m was the only event held on 2 July). The women's meet was held separately at Recreation Field in Naugatuck, Connecticut, on 4 August.

At the men's championships, high winds caused slow winning times in most events. In the women's competition, the original host Waterbury, Connecticut withdrew at the last minute causing the meet to be moved. Lula Mae Hymes won the 100 m and long jump.

== Results ==
=== Men ===
Event	Gold		Silver		Bronze	
100 m	Ben Johnson	10.7	Wilbur Greer		Mozel Ellerbe	
200 m	Mack Robinson	21.3	Perrin Walker		Clyde Jeffrey	
400 m	Ray Malott	47.6	Jim Herbert		William Fritz (CAN)	
800 m	Howard Borck	1:51.5	John Marion	1:51.9	Charles Beetham	
1500 m	Glenn Cunningham	3:52.5	Charles Fenske	3:52.7	Archie San Romani	
5000 m	Gregory Rice	15:15.0	Walter Mehl		Raymond Sears	
10000 m	Eino Pentti	32:15.6	Robert Rankine (CAN)		Errol Vaughn	
Marathon	Pat Dengis	2:39:38.2	Gerard Cote (CAN)	2:43:30.0	Melvin Porter	2:44:05.0
110 m hurdles	Fred Wolcott	14.3	Allan Tolmich		Harvey Woodstra	
400 m hurdles	Jack Patterson	52.8	John Borican		Grover Bradley	
3000 m steeplechase	Joseph McCluskey	9:23.3	Forrest Efaw		Thomas Deckard	
High jump	Melvin Walker	2.00 m	David Albritton	2.00 m	Gilbert Cruter	1.94 m
Pole vault	Cornelius Warmerdam	4.41 m	George Varoff	4.27 m	none awarded	
Pole vault	Cornelius Warmerdam	4.41 m	Kenneth Dills	4.27 m	none awarded	
Long jump	William Lacefield	7.62 m	Arnold Nutting	7.40 m	Jackie Robinson	7.38 m
Triple jump	Herschel Neil	14.77 m	Eulace Peacock	14.66 m	Billy Brown	14.64 m
Shot put	Francis Ryan	15.89 m	William Watson	15.51 m	Woodrow Strode	15.40 m
Discus throw	Peter Zagar	50.98 m	Phil Levy	50.23 m	Hugh Cannon	50.03 m
Hammer throw	Irving Folwartshny	54.63 m	William Lynch	53.06 m	Henry Dreyer	51.71 m
Javelin throw	Nick Vulmanic	66.64 m	Lowell Todd	65.76 m	Charles Soper	62.22 m
Decathlon	Joe Scott	6486 pts	Hamilton Morningstar	5419 1/2 pts	Allen Scisco	5354 2/3 pts
200 m hurdles	Fred Wolcott	23.6				
3000 m walk	Harry Cieman (CAN)	13:39.9				
Pentathlon	John Borican	3304 pts				
Weight throw for distance	Louis Lepis	10.70 m				

=== Women ===
Event	Gold		Silver	Bronze
50 m	Claire Isicson	6.6	Ivy Wilson	Olive Hasenfus
100 m	Lula Mae Hymes	12.4	Olive Hasenfus	Claire Isicson
200 m	Fanny Vitale	26.7	Esther Brown	Marie Cottrell
80 m hurdles	Marie Cottrell	13.0	Cora Gaines	Sylvia Rothenberg
High jump	Margarete Bergman	1.57 m	Mildred Pufundt	Beulah Clark
High jump	Margarete Bergman	1.57 m	Mildred Pufundt	Frances Sobczak
High jump	Margarete Bergman	1.57 m	Mildred Pufundt	Mildred Kosick
Long jump	Lula Mae Hymes	5.23 m	Dorothy Catocci	Esther Dennis
Shot put	Catherine Fellmeth	11.73 m	Florence Wright	Margarete Bergman
Discus throw	Catherine Fellmeth	38.41 m	Frances Sobczak	Elizabeth Lindsay
Javelin throw	Rose Auerbach	37.05 m	Margaret Barnes	Rose Cea
Baseball throw	Betsy Jochum	261 ft 7 in (79.73 m)		

== See also ==
- 1938 USA Indoor Track and Field Championships
- List of USA Outdoor Track and Field Championships winners (men)
- List of USA Outdoor Track and Field Championships winners (women)
