= 1937 USA Outdoor Track and Field Championships =

American athletics championship event

- Dates: 2–3 July (men); 25 September (women)
- Host city: Milwaukee, Wisconsin (men); Trenton, New Jersey (women)
- Venue: Marquette Stadium (men); Trenton Central High School (women)
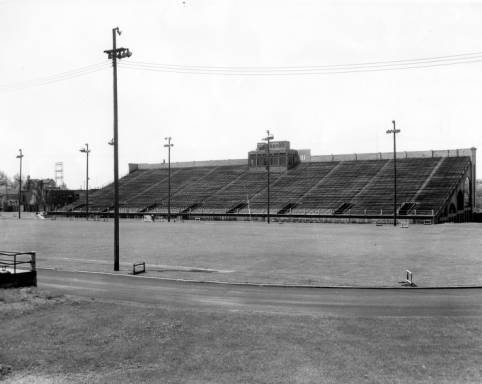

The 1937 USA Outdoor Track and Field Championships were organized by the Amateur Athletic Union (AAU) and served as the national championships in outdoor track and field for the United States.

The men's edition was held at Marquette Stadium in Milwaukee, Wisconsin, and it took place 2–3 July. The women's meet was held separately at Trenton Central High School in Trenton, New Jersey, on 25 September.

The men's championships marked the first time (other than the 1936 United States Olympic trials) that the meet was held over two days. In the women's competition, the 16-year-old athlete Claire Isicson, described as "unknown", won the 50 m and 100 m and finished 4th in the long jump.

== Results ==
=== Men ===
| Event | Gold | | Silver | | Bronze | |
|---|---|---|---|---|---|---|
| 100 m | Perrin Walker | 10.7 | Ben Johnson | inches behind | Ray Dean | 1 yd behind 2nd |
| 200 m | Jack Weiershauser | 20.9 | Mack Robinson | | Norwood Ewell | |
| 400 m | Ray Malott | 47.1 | Robert Young | 5 yards behind | Charles Belcher | 1 ft behind 2nd |
| 800 m | John Woodruff | 1:50.0 | Elroy Robinson | 1:50.5 e | Ross Bush | 1:50.8 e |
| 1500 m | Glenn Cunningham | 3:51.8 | James Smith | 3:54.0 | Charles Fenske | |
| 5000 m | Joseph McCluskey | 15:04.1 | Thomas Deckard | 150 yards behind | Raymond Sears | |
| 10,000 m | Eino Pentti | 32:02.0 | William Feiler | | John A. Kelley | |
| Marathon | Melvin Porter | 2:44.22 | Pat Dengis | 2:46.36 | James Bartlett (CAN) | 2:47.09 |
| 110 m hurdles | Allan Tolmich | 14.5 | Roy Staley | | Forrest Towns | |
| 400 m hurdles | Jack Patterson | 52.3 | James Hucker | 52.5 e | Tom Moore | |
| 3000 m steeplechase | Floyd Lochner | 9:26.6 | Eino Pentti | | Walter Stone | |
| High jump | David Albritton | 2.05 m | Cornelius Johnson | 2.00 m | none awarded | |
| High jump | David Albritton | 2.05 m | Melvin Walker | 2.00 m | none awarded | |
| Pole vault | William Sefton | 4.46 m | Cornelius Warmerdam | 4.46 m | Earle Meadows | 4.46 m |
| Long jump | Kermit King | 7.66 m | John Brooks | 7.55 m | Arnold Nutting | 7.34 m |
| Triple jump | Billy Brown | 15.12 m | Hiney Kent | 14.90 m | Dick Ganslen | 14.83 m |
| Shot put | James Reynolds | 15.73 m | Dimitri Zaitz | 15.34 m | Ray Allee | 15.28 m |
| Discus throw | Phil Levy | 49.85 m | Ken Carpenter | 49.82 m | Gordon Dunn | 48.62 m |
| Hammer throw | Irving Folwartshny | 52.93 m | William Lynch | 50.79 m | Anton Kishon | 50.00 m |
| Javelin throw | William Reitz | 68.51 m | Robert Peoples | 67.08 m | Alton Terry | 65.93 m |
| 200 m hurdles | Allan Tolmich | 23.3 | | | | |
| 3000 m walk | Max Beutel | 14:15.0 | | | | |
| Pentathlon | Eulace Peacock | 3030 pts | | | | |
| Weight throw for distance | Louis Lepis | 10.24 m | | | | |

=== Women ===
| Event | Gold | | Silver | | Bronze | |
|---|---|---|---|---|---|---|
| 50 m | Claire Isicson | 6.8 | Lula Mae Hymes | | Josephina Warren | |
| 100 m | Claire Isicson | 12.8 | Josephina Warren | | Esther Dennis | |
| 200 m | Gertrude Johnson | 26.0 | Fanny Vitale | | Rose Cea | |
| 80 m hurdles | Cora Gaines | 12.8 | Sylvia Rothenberg | | Anna Lebo | |
| High jump | Margarete Bergman | 1.51 m | Cora Gaines | 1.48 m | Rose Harley | 1.36 m |
| High jump | Margarete Bergman | 1.51 m | Cora Gaines | 1.48 m | Lucile Harris | 1.36 m |
| Long jump | Lula Mae Hymes | 5.40 m | Mabel Blanch | 5.28 m | Esther Dennis | 5.15 m |
| Shot put | Margarete Bergman | 11.45 m | Florence Wright | 11.40 m | Florence Blasch (POL) | 10.80 m |
| Discus throw | Elizabeth Lindsay | 32.89 m | Florence Wright | 32.28 m | Betty McLaughlin | 30.68 m |
| Javelin throw | Rose Auerbach | 37.63 m | Sylvia Broman | 33.09 m | Florence Blasch (POL) | 32.22 m |
| Baseball throw | Rose Cea | 249 ft 8 1/4 in (76.1 m) | | | | |

== See also ==
- 1937 USA Indoor Track and Field Championships
- List of USA Outdoor Track and Field Championships winners (men)
- List of USA Outdoor Track and Field Championships winners (women)
