= 1939 USA Outdoor Track and Field Championships =

American athletics championship event

- Dates: 3–4 July (men); 4 September (women)
- Host city: Lincoln, Nebraska (men); Waterbury, Connecticut (women)
- Venue: Memorial Stadium (men); Municipal Stadium (women)
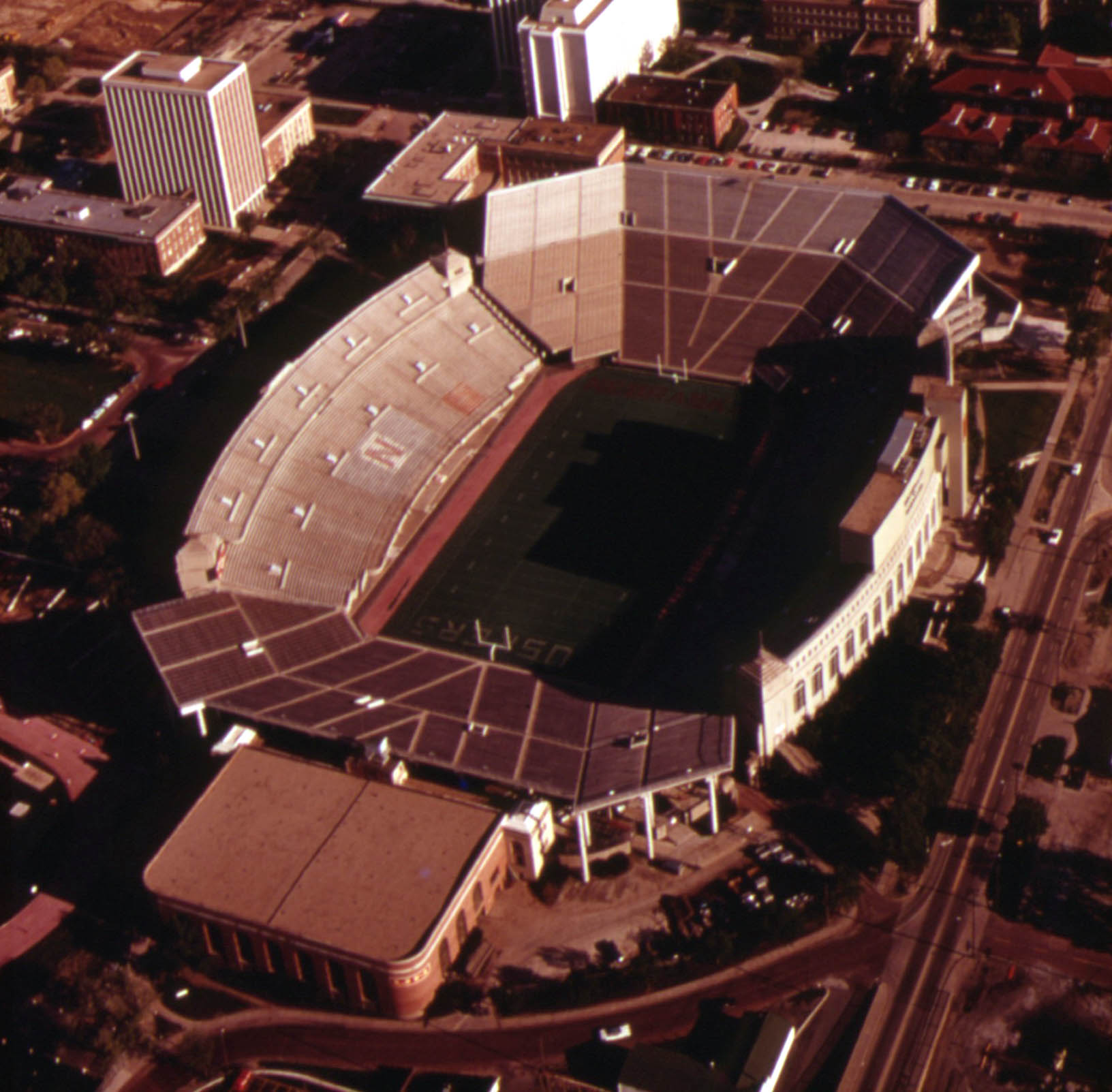

The 1939 USA Outdoor Track and Field Championships were organized by the Amateur Athletic Union (AAU) and served as the national championships in outdoor track and field for the United States.

The men's edition was held at Memorial Stadium in Lincoln, Nebraska, and it took place 3–4 July. The women's meet was held separately at Municipal Stadium in Waterbury, Connecticut, on 4 September.

The men's championships were held in unusually hot 100 °F (38 °C) weather. In the women's competition, Dorothy Dodson won the first of her 11 consecutive javelin throw titles and Alice Coachman won the first of what would be her 10 consecutive long jump titles.

== Results ==
=== Men ===
Event	Gold		Silver		Bronze	
100 m	Clyde Jeffrey	10.2 w	Herbert Thompson	10.3 e w	Norwood Ewell	10.3 e w
200 m straight (Note: Race was held with a slight turn)	Norwood Ewell	21.0	Clyde Jeffrey	21.1 e	Perrin Walker	
400 m	Erwin Miller	48.3	John Woodruff	48.6 e	Jim Herbert	49.8 e
800 m	Charles Beetham	1:51.7	Campbell Kane		Kirman Storli	
1500 m	Blaine Rideout	3:51.5	Charles Fenske	3:52.0 e	Louis Zamperini	3:52.6 e
5000 m	Gregory Rice	14:50.9	Ralph Schwarzkopf		Forrest Efaw	
10000 m	Lou Gregory	33:11.5	James Whittaker		Joseph Sullivan	
Marathon	Pat Dengis	2:33:45.2	Gerard Cote (CAN)	2:35:33.0	John A. Kelley	2:37:08.0
110 m hurdles	Joe Batiste	14.1 w	Fred Wolcott	14.1 e w	Allan Tolmich	14.2 e w
400 m hurdles	Roy Cochran	51.9	Robert Simmons	52.0 e	Carl McBain	
3000 m steeplechase	Joseph McCluskey	9:23.1	George DeGeorge		James Rafferty	
High jump	Lester Steers	2.04 m	William Stewart	2.00 m	David Albritton	2.00 m
High jump	Lester Steers	2.04 m	William Stewart	2.00 m	Melvin Walker	2.00 m
Pole vault	George Varoff	4.37 m	Cornelius Warmerdam	4.34 m	Milton Padway	4.11 m
Pole vault	George Varoff	4.37 m	Cornelius Warmerdam	4.34 m	Dick Ganslen	4.11 m
Pole vault	George Varoff	4.37 m	Cornelius Warmerdam	4.34 m	Kenneth Dills	4.11 m
Long jump	William Lacefield	7.76 m w	William Watson	7.66 m w	Ed Gordon	7.65 m w
Triple jump	Herschel Neil	14.56 m	Dick Ganslen	14.20 m	Oral Hairston	14.04 m
Shot put	Lilburn Williams	16.33 m	William Watson	16.31 m	Uell Standley Andersen	16.23 m
Discus throw	Philip Fox	52.54 m	Peter Zagar	48.95 m	Alfred Blozis	48.57 m
Hammer throw	Chester Cruikshank	53.07 m	John McLaughry	52.02 m	William McKeever	51.91 m
Javelin throw	Boyd Brown	65.80 m	Herb Grote	64.97 m	Nick Vukmanic	62.89 m
Decathlon	Joe Scott	6671 pts	Kenneth Rathbun	6226 pts	Alphonso Gavrilavicz	6071 pts
200 m hurdles	Fred Wolcott	22.9				
3000 m walk	Otto Kotraba	14:04.7				
Pentathlon	John Borican	2947 pts				
Weight throw for distance	Stanley Johnson	10.53 m				

=== Women ===
Event	Gold		Silver		Bronze	
50 m	Gertrude Johnson	6.7	Ivy Wilson		Jeanette Jones	
100 m	Olive Hasenfus	12.6	Lucy Newell		Elizabeth Kinnard	
200 m	Stanislawa Walasiewicz (POL)	25.5	Esther Brown		Hilda Plepis	
80 m hurdles	Marie Cottrell	12.5	Sybil Cooper		Leila Perry	
High jump	Alice Coachman	1.57 m	Mary Haydon (CAN)	1.55 m	Barbara Howe	1.47 m
Long jump	Stanislawa Walasiewicz (POL)	5.89 m	Lula Mae Hymes	5.52 m	Lucy Newell	5.28 m
Shot put (8 lb)	Catherine Fellmeth	12.54 m	Ramona Harris	11.50 m	Florence Wright	11.30 m
Discus throw	Catherine Fellmeth	34.63 m	Hattie Hall	31.73 m	Florence Wright	30.29 m
Javelin throw	Dorothy Dodson	39.62 m	Rose Auerbach	37.62 m	Jeanette McGunnegle	37.26 m
Baseball throw	Catherine O'Connell	233 ft 3 1/2 in (71.1 m)				

== See also ==
- 1939 USA Indoor Track and Field Championships
- List of USA Outdoor Track and Field Championships winners (men)
- List of USA Outdoor Track and Field Championships winners (women)
