= 1934 USA Outdoor Track and Field Championships =

American athletics championship event

- Dates: 29–30 June (men)
- Host city: Milwaukee, Wisconsin (men)
- Venue: Marquette Stadium (men)
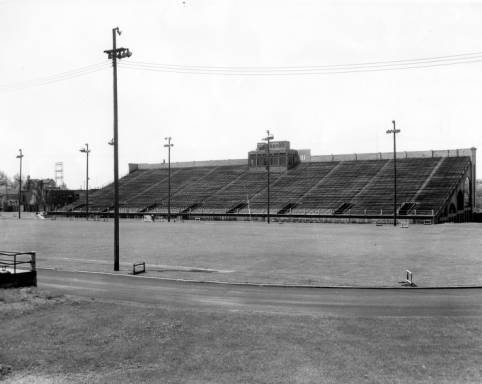

The 1934 USA Outdoor Track and Field Championships were organized by the Amateur Athletic Union (AAU) and served as the national championships in outdoor track and field for the United States.

The men's edition was held at Marquette Stadium in Milwaukee, Wisconsin, and it took place 29–30 June. The women's meet was originally scheduled to be held in San Francisco, but the organizers withdrew due to financial reasons, making the 1934 USA Indoor Track and Field Championships the only women's track and field national championships that year.

The men's championships were described as the greatest AAU championships ever, both at the time by Milwaukee media and in retrospect by Track & Field News. In the 1500 m, both Bill Bonthron and Glenn Cunningham broke the world record. Jack Torrance also set the shot put world record and Glenn Hardin broke the 400 m hurdles record. About 17,000 spectators attended.

== Results ==
=== Men ===
Event	Gold		Silver		Bronze	
100 m	Ralph Metcalfe	10.4	Jesse Owens	10.4 e	Eulace Peacock	
200 m	Ralph Metcalfe	21.3	Foy Draper		Charles Parsons	
400 m	Ivan Fuqua	47.4	Howard Green		Howard Jones	
800 m	Benjamin Eastman	1:50.4	Elton Brown	1:51.0	Charles Hornbostel	
1500 m	William Bonthron	3:48.8	Glenn Cunningham	3:48.9	Gene Venzke	3:50.5
5000 m	Frank Crowley	15:18.6	John Follows		Joseph Mangan	
10,000 m	Eino Pentti	33:34.2	Thomas McDonough		Lou Gregory	
Marathon	David Komonen (CAN)	2:43:26.6	Melvin Porter	2:48:04.0	William Steiner	2:49:45.0
110 m hurdles	Percy Beard	14.6	Philip Good		Sam Allen	
400 m hurdles	Glenn Hardin	51.8	Edgar Ablowich		Robert Evans	
3000 m steeplechase	Harold Manning	9:13.1	Joseph McCluskey	9:14.2 e	Eino Pentti	
High jump	Walter Marty	2.05 m	none awarded		George Spitz	2.02 m
High jump	Cornelius Johnson	2.05 m	none awarded		George Spitz	2.02 m
Pole vault	Wirt Thompson	4.25 m	none awarded		none awarded	
Pole vault	Keith Brown	4.25 m	none awarded		none awarded	
Pole vault	William Graber	4.25 m	none awarded		none awarded	
Long jump	Jesse Owens	7.82 m	Robert Clark	7.32 m	John Brooks	7.33 m
Triple jump	Dudley Wilkins	14.68 m	Nathan Blair	14.46 m	Solomon Furth	14.33 m
Shot put	Jack Torrance	16.90 m	John Lyman	16.70 m	George Theodoratus	16.30 m
Discus throw	Robert Jones	47.52 m	Gordon Dunn	47.03 m	Henri LaBorde	46.63 m
Hammer throw	Donald Favor	49.83 m	Peter Zaremba	49.62 m	Gantt Miller	49.51 m
Javelin throw	Ralston LeGore	66.08 m	John Mottram	63.91 m	Lee Bartlett	63.85 m
Decathlon	Robert Clark	7966.05 pts	Joseph Hall	7488.89 pts	Richard Baldry	7411.18 pts
200 m hurdles	Philip Good	24.5				
Pentathlon	Eulace Peacock	3258 pts				
Weight throw for distance	Clark Haskins	10.70 m				

== See also ==
- List of USA Outdoor Track and Field Championships winners (men)
- List of USA Outdoor Track and Field Championships winners (women)
