= Men's high jump indoor world record progression =

The men's high jump indoor world record progression started in 1881, with additional demonstration and professional records. The best indoor performances on record as agreed to by the world's leading statisticians were accepted as the inaugural IAAF Indoor World Records from 1 January 1987. However, the inaugural record in this event was set early in 1987 by Patrick Sjoberg. Records as per the IAAF are as at 31 January 2010.

== Record Progression ==
In lightgreen records ratified by IAAF.

| Mark | Athlete | Venue | Date |
|---|---|---|---|
| 1.75 | C. F. Poland (United Kingdom) | London | December 8, 1881 |
| 1.765 | N. W. McDermott (United States) | Baltimore | January 17, 1884 |
| 1.83 | William Byrd-Page (United States) | Philadelphia | January 23, 1888 |
| 1.89 | George R. Fearing (United States) | Boston | February 14, 1891 |
| 1.905 | Michael Sweeney (United States) | Philadelphia | February 17, 1893 |
| 1.91 | Michael Sweeney (United States) | Boston | February 10, 1894 |
| 1.94 | Samuel Lawrence (United States) | Boston | February 9, 1912 |
| 1.95 | John Murphy (United States) | New York City | February 1, 1922 |
| 1.95 | Leroy Brown (United States) | Boston | February 25, 1922 |
| 1.95 | Leroy Brown (United States) | New York City | March 11, 1922 |
| 1.96 | Leroy Brown (United States) | New York City | January 31, 1923 |
| 1.96 | Richmond Landon (United States) | New York City | January 31, 1923 |
| 1.98 | Harold Osborn (United States) | Urbana | January 11, 1924 |
| 1.98 | Harold Osborn (United States) | Chicago | March 19, 1924 |
| 1.988 | Harold Osborn (United States) | New York City | January 27, 1925 |
| 1.991 | Harold Osborn (United States) | Kansas City | February 7, 1925 |
| 2.00 | Harold Osborn (United States) | Chicago | March 20, 1925 |
| 2.00 | Bert Nelson (United States) | South Bend | February 1, 1930 |
| 2.005 | George Spitz (United States) | New York City | February 7, 1931 |
| 2.02 | George Spitz (United States) | New York City | February 6, 1932 |
| 2.045 | George Spitz (United States) | Boston | February 13, 1932 |
| 2.05 | Walter Marty (United States) | New York City | February 17, 1934 |
| 2.05 | Gilbert Cruter (United States) | Fort Collins | February 22, 1936 |
| 2.055 | Edward Burke (United States) | New York City | February 22, 1936 |
| 2.055 | Cornelius Johnson (United States) | New York City | February 22, 1936 |
| 2.06 | Edward Burke (United States) | New York City | February 27, 1937 |
| 2.075* | Mel Walker (United States) | Indianapolis | March 20, 1937 |
| 2.08 | Ken Wiesner (United States) | Milwaukee | March 14, 1953 |
| 2.10 | Ken Wiesner (United States) | Chicago | March 28, 1953 |
| 2.11 | John Thomas (United States) | Hanover, N.H. | January 10, 1959 |
| 2.125 | John Thomas (United States) | Boston | January 17, 1959 |
| 2.13 | John Thomas (United States) | New York City | January 31, 1959 |
| 2.13 | John Thomas (United States) | New York City | February 14, 1959 |
| 2.13 | John Thomas (United States) | New York City | February 21, 1959 |
| 2.165 | John Thomas (United States) | New York City | February 21, 1959 |
| 2.17 | John Thomas (United States) | New York City | January 30, 1960 |
| 2.17 | John Thomas (United States) | Boston | February 6, 1960 |
| 2.18 | John Thomas (United States) | New York City | February 20, 1960 |
| 2.195 | John Thomas (United States) | Chicago | March 11, 1960 |
| 2.21* | Valeriy Brumel (Soviet Union) | Leningrad | January 28, 1961 |
| 2.25* | Valeriy Brumel (Soviet Union) | Leningrad | January 28, 1961 |
| 2.26 A | Dwight Stones (United States) | Pocatello | January 17, 1975 |
| 2.265 | Dwight Stones (United States) | Los Angeles | January 18, 1975 |
| 2.265 | Dwight Stones (United States) | Inglewood | February 7, 1975 |
| 2.27 | Dwight Stones (United States) | Oklahoma City | February 15, 1975 |
| 2.28 | Dwight Stones (United States) | New York City | February 21, 1975 |
| 2.29 | Dwight Stones (United States) | New York City | February 20, 1976 |
| 2.30 | Dwight Stones (United States) | San Diego | February 21, 1976 |
| 2.31 | Greg Joy (Canada) | College Park | January 13, 1978 |
| 2.32 | Franklin Jacobs (United States) | New York City | January 27, 1978 |
| 2.33 | Vladimir Yashchenko (Soviet Union) | Milan | March 12, 1978 |
| 2.35 | Vladimir Yashchenko (Soviet Union) | Milan | March 12, 1978 |
| 2.36 | Igor Paklin (Soviet Union) | Milan | February 1, 1984 |
| 2.37 | Carlo Thränhardt (West Germany) | West Berlin | February 24, 1984 |
| 2.38 | Patrik Sjöberg (Sweden) | West Berlin | February 22, 1985 |
| 2.39 | Dietmar Mögenburg (West Germany) | Köln | February 24, 1985 |
| 2.40 | Carlo Thränhardt (West Germany) | Simmerath | January 16, 1987 |
| 2.41 | Patrik Sjöberg (Sweden) | Piraeus | February 1, 1987 |
| 2.42 | Carlo Thränhardt (West Germany) | West Berlin | February 26, 1988 |
| 2.43 | Javier Sotomayor (Cuba) | Budapest | March 4, 1989 |

Asterisks indicates cinder take-off, "A" indicates mark set at altitude

=== Demonstration ===
| Mark | Athlete | Venue | Date |
|---|---|---|---|
| 2.05 | Walter Marty (United States) | New York | February 24, 1936 |
| 2.08 | Les Steers (United States) | Eugene | February 14, 1941 |
| 2.145 | Les Steers (United States) | Eugene | February 27, 1941 |
| 2.35 | Dietmar Mögenburg (West Germany) | Herne | September 4, 1980 |

=== Professional ===
| Mark | Athlete | Venue | Date |
|---|---|---|---|
| 2.255 A | John Radetich (United States) | Pocatello | March 3, 1973 |

== See also ==
- List of world records in athletics
- Men's high jump world record progression
