= Robert Simmons =

Robert or Rob Simmons may refer to:

- Rob Simmons (born 1943), U.S. Representative from Connecticut
- Rob Simmons (rugby union) (born 1989), Australian rugby union player
- Robert G. Simmons (1891–1969), U.S. Representative from Nebraska
- Robert Simmons (South Carolina politician), state legislator who serves in the South Carolina Senate from Berkeley County
- Robert Malcolm Simmons (born 1938), director of the Randall Division of Cell and Molecular Biophysics at King's College London
- Bob Simmons (surfer) (Robert Wilson Simmons, 1919–1954), early surfing pioneer
- Robert John Simmons (1837–1863), Bermudian who served in the American Civil War
- Robert Simmons (prisoner), African American conscientious objector and anti-war activist
- Rob Simmons, character from the Mighty Orbots
- Mr. Robert Simmons, fictional character from the Nickelodeon animated series Hey Arnold!
- Robert Simmons (hurdler) (born 1918), 400 m hurdles runner-up at the 1939 USA Outdoor Track and Field Championships

== See also ==
- Bob Simmons (disambiguation)
