= 1940 USA Outdoor Track and Field Championships =

American athletics championship event

- Dates: 28–29 June (men); 7 July (women)
- Host city: Fresno, California (men); Ocean City, New Jersey (women)
- Venue: Ratcliffe Stadium (men); Carey Stadium (women)
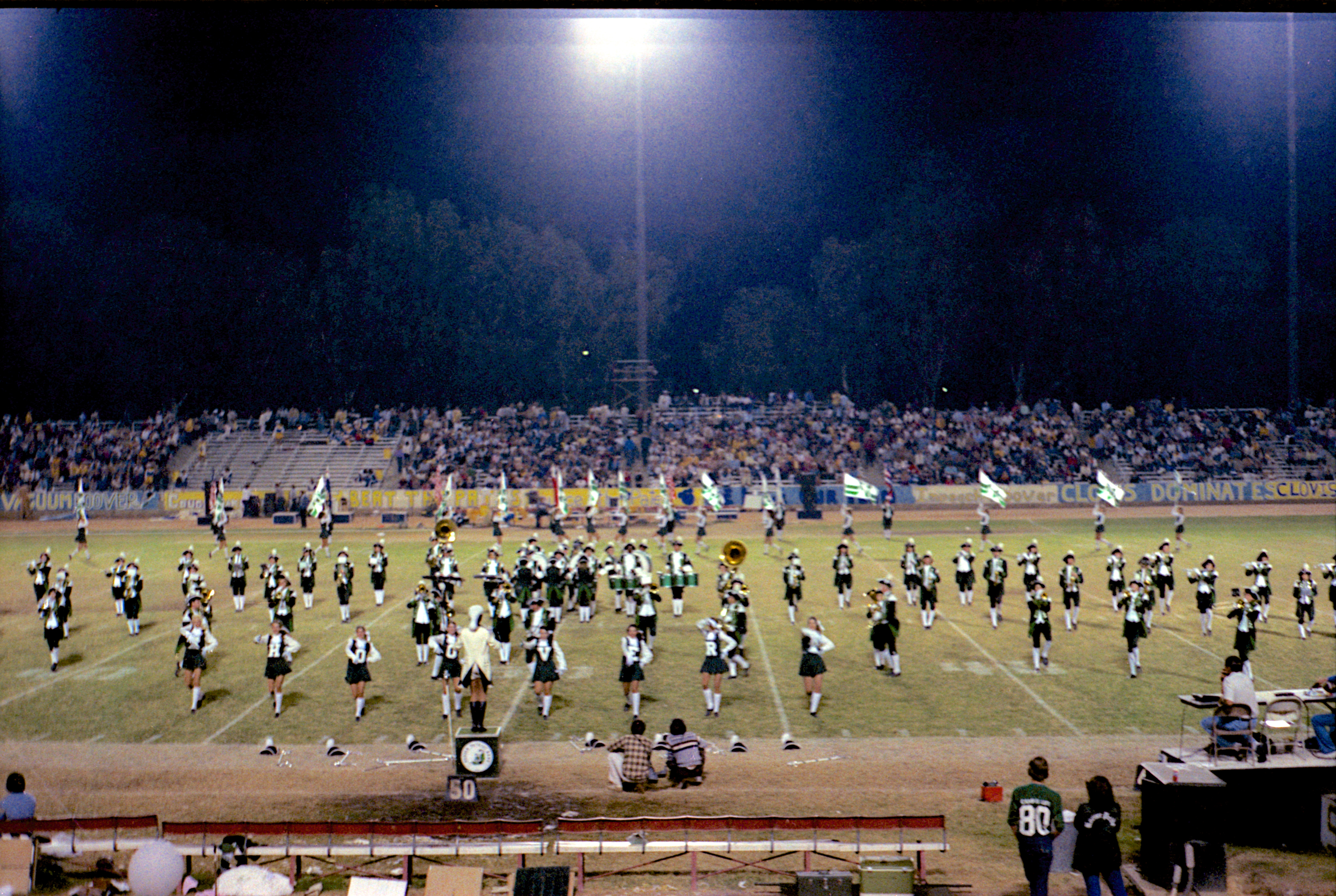

The 1940 USA Outdoor Track and Field Championships were organized by the Amateur Athletic Union (AAU) and served as the national championships in outdoor track and field for the United States.

The men's edition was held at Ratcliffe Stadium in Fresno, California, and it took place 28–29 June. The women's meet was held separately at Carey Stadium in Ocean City, New Jersey, on 7 July.

At the men's championships, Dutch Warmerdam set a world record in the pole vault, becoming the second person in history to jump over 15 feet (4.6 m). The women's competition was marked by the debut of Jean Lane, who won the 50 m and 100 m.

The women's events were to be used as the Olympic trials for the 1940 Summer Olympics before they were canceled due to World War II.

== Results ==
=== Men ===
Event	Gold		Silver		Bronze	
100 m	Harold Davis	10.3	Norwood Ewell	10.4 (Note: Recorded as 10.34 using fully automatic timing)	Billy Brown	10.6 (Note: Recording as 10.59 using fully automatic timing)
200 m straight	Harold Davis	20.4	Norwood Ewell	20.8 e	Leo Tarrant	21.3 e
400 m	Grover Klemmer	47.0	Charles Belcher		Cliff Bourland	
800 m	Charles Beetham	1:51.1	Campbell Kane		Edward Burrowes	
1500 m	Walter Mehl	3:47.9	Glenn Cunningham	3:48.0	Paul Moore	3:48.5
5000 m	Gregory Rice	14:33.4	Donald Lash		Robert Madrid	
10000 m	Donald Lash	32:29.2	Lou Gregory		James Rafferty	
Marathon	Gerard Cote (CAN)	2:34:06.2	Lou Gregory	2:35:10.0	Leslie Pawson	2:40:05.0
110 m hurdles	Fred Wolcott	13.9	Edward Dugger	14.0	Joe Batiste	14.1
400 m hurdles	Carl McBain	51.6	Roy Cochran	52.1	Harry March	52.2
3000 m steeplechase	Joseph McCluskey	9:16.6	Forrest Efaw		George DeGeorge	
High jump	Lester Steers	2.05 m	Adam Berry	1.97 m	Humbert Smith	1.94 m
Pole vault	Cornelius Warmerdam	4.60 m	Kenneth Dills	4.37 m	Bernard Deacon	4.11 m
Long jump	Billy Brown	7.65 m	Pat Turner	7.52 m	Frank Freeman	7.12 m
Triple jump	Billy Brown	15.31 m	Hiney Kent	14.59 m	Ray Atzet	14.45 m
Shot put	Alfred Blozis	16.77 m	Uell Stanley Anderson	15.93 m	Herbert Michael	15.85 m
Discus throw	Philip Fox	51.93 m	Alfred Blozis	49.39 m	Archie Harris	49.13 m
Hammer throw	Stanley Johnson	55.66 m	Robert Bennett	55.59 m	Chester Cruikshank	53.73 m
Javelin throw	Boyd Brown	68.01 m	Lowell Todd	66.34 m	Nick Vulmanic	65.74 m
Decathlon	William Watson	7523 pts	Lee Todd	6941 pts	Joe Scott	6702 pts
200 m hurdles	Fred Wolcott	22.6				
3000 m walk	Otto Kotraba	13:52.0				
Pentathlon	Harry March	2981 pts				
Weight throw for distance	Henry Dreyer	10.82 m				

=== Women ===
Event	Gold		Silver	Bronze
50 m	Jean Lane	6.6	Lucy Newell	Jeanette Jones
100 m	Jean Lane	12.0	Stanislawa Walasiewicz (POL)	Lula Mae Hymes
200 m	Stanislawa Walasiewicz (POL)	26.1	Olive Hasenfus	Edna Gustavson
80 m hurdles	Sybil Cooper	13.1	Nancy Cowperthwaite	Lillie Purifoy
High jump	Alice Coachman	1.50 m	Gerda Gottlieb	Betty Henning
Long jump	Stanislawa Walasiewicz (POL)	5.37 m	Lucy Newell	Betty Charters
Shot put (8 lb)	Catherine Fellmeth	11.67 m	Ramona Harris	Frances Sobczak (POL)
Discus throw	Catherine Fellmeth	35.02 m	Evelyn Taylor	Frances Sobczak (POL)
Javelin throw	Dorothy Dodson	38.43 m	Miriam Melton	Marie Sostar
Baseball throw	Angela Mica	241 ft 9 1/2 in (73.69 m)		

== See also ==
- List of USA Outdoor Track and Field Championships winners (men)
- List of USA Outdoor Track and Field Championships winners (women)
