= Athletics at the 1939 International University Games =

Multi-sport event in Monte Carlo, Monaco

Official poster

The 1939 International University Games were organised by the Confédération Internationale des Étudiants (CIE) and held in Monte Carlo, Monaco. At these games a number of Athletic events were contested. An alternative version was held in Vienna, Austria.

== Athletics medal summary ==
=== Men ===
Event	Gold		Silver		Bronze	
100 Metres	Clyde Jeffrey (USA)	10.5	René Valmy (FRA)	10.7	Kenneth Jenkins (ENG)	Unknown
200 Metres	Clyde Jeffrey (USA)	21.5	Kenneth Jenkins (ENG)	22.0	Joe Batiste (USA)	22.0
400 Metres	Wacław Gąssowski (POL)	49.3	J.A.M. Robertson (SCO)	49.6	Zygmunt Zabierzowski (POL)	50.1
800 Metres	Charlie Beetham (USA)	1:53.3	Jacques Lévèque (FRA)	1:53.8	Jean Pfanner (FRA)	1:54.3
1500 Metres	Blaine Rideout (USA)	04:01.1	Ralfs Balodis (LAT)	4:03.5	Walter Lutz (SUI)	04:09.0
5000 Metres	Morrison "Jack" Carstairs (SCO)	15:20.2	Ralph Schwarzkopf (USA)	15:20.2	Roger Leredde (FRA)	16:11.2
110 Metres Hurdles	Joe Batiste (USA)	14.6	Jean-François Brisson (FRA)	15.2	Stanisław Sulikowski (POL)	15.8
400 Metres Hurdles	Roy Cochran (USA)	52.8	Alec Palmer (ENG)	56.4	W. Mitchell (SCO)	56.5
4 x 100 Metres Relay	(United States) United States; Roy Cochran; Clyde Jeffrey; Joe Batiste; Bill Watson	41.9	(France) France; Jean Fusil; René Valmy; Albert Bocourt; Marc Aubert	42.1	(Latvia) Latvia; Valdis Pormanis; Ābrams Feldhūns; Georgs Ālers; Arnolds Bērziņš	43.7
4 x 400 Metres Relay	(United States) United States; Blaine Rideout; Roy Cochran; Clyde Jeffrey; Charles Beetham	3:14.5	(France) France; Jean Pfanner; Paul Peyre; Jacques Lévèque; Paul Faure	3:16.3	Scotland	3:28.5
1600 Metres Medley Relay	(United States) United States; Roy Cochran; Clyde Jeffrey; Charles Beetham; Blaine Rideout	3:27.8	(Poland) Poland; Wacław Gąssowski; Stefan Sulikowski; Jan Tęsiorowski; Zygmunt Zabierzowski	3:32.9	(France) France; Albert Bocourt; Marc Aubert; Paul Peyre; Henri Durand	50 m bh2
High Jump	Les Steers (USA)	1.90	Joe Batiste (USA)	1.80	S.A. Edwards (British Ceylon)	1.75
Pole Vault	George Varoff (USA)	4.11	Luís Taliberti (BRA)	3.80	Pekka Hopea (FIN)	3.50
Long Jump	William Watson (USA)	7.11	François Mersch (LUX)	7.05	Jean Beaudry (FRA)	6.86
Triple Jump	Jouko Norén (FIN)	14.11	Paul Faucher (FRA)	13.70	Jean Nichil (FRA)	13.68
Shot	William Watson (USA)	15.78	Witold Gerutto (POL)	14.68	Rolf Saxholm (NOR)	14.62
Discus	William Watson (USA)	45.85	Helge Sivertsen (NOR)	45.08	Witold Gerutto (POL)	43.92
Javelin	Hugo Vainio (FIN)	67.87	Les Steers (USA)	62.20	Rolf Faes (SUI)	59.52
Pentathlon	Rolf Faes (SUI)	3456	Arnolds Bērziņš (LAT)	3216	Les Steers (USA)	2998

=== Women ===
Event	Gold		Silver		Bronze	
80 Metres	Jeanine Toulouse (FRA)	10.4	Paulette Morisson (FRA)	Unknown	Dejean (FRA)	Unknown
200 Metres	Marjorie Gray (SCO)	26.8	Marguerite André (FRA)	28.1	Marie-Thérèse Stiegler (FRA)	28.2
80 Metres Hurdles	Jeanne Heitz (FRA)	13.1	Elizabeth Duke (ENG)	13.2e	Olive McMillan (SCO)	Unknown
4 x 100 Metres Relay	(France) France; Jeanine Toulouse; Paulette Morisson; Dejean; Marguerite André	51.7	(Scotland) Scotland; Olive McMillan; Rosamund Sellar; Nancy Watt; Marjorie Gray	52.4	(England) England; Elizabeth Duke; Helene Mayer; Inez Sweeting; Dorothy Saunders	Unknown
High Jump	Elizabeth Duke (ENG)	1.49	Marjorie Gray (SCO)	1.46	Helene Mayer (ENG)	1.42
Long Jump	Rosamund Sellar (SCO)	5.09	Nancy Watt (SCO)	4.92	Miche (FRA)	4.91
Shot	Marie-Thérèse Stiegler (FRA)	9.19	Elizabeth Duke (ENG)	8.93	Unknown	Unknown
Discus	Inez Sweeting (ENG)	29.32	Marie-Thérèse Stiegler (FRA)	28.09	Dorothy Saunders (ENG)	23.90
Javelin	Dorothy Saunders (ENG)	22.34	Inez Sweeting (ENG)	20.45	Unknown	Unknown

== Medal table ==
Rank	Nation	Gold	Silver	Bronze	Total
1	United States (USA)	11	3	2	16
2	France (FRA)	3	7	7	17
3	Scotland (SCO)	3	4	3	10
4	England (ENG)	2	4	4	10
5	Finland (FIN)	2	0	1	3
6	Poland (POL)	1	2	3	6
7	Switzerland (SUI)	1	0	2	3
8	Latvia (LAT)	0	2	0	2
9	Norway (NOR)	0	1	1	2
10	Brazil (BRA)	0	1	0	1
10	Luxembourg (LUX)	0	1	0	1
Totals (11 entries)		23	25	23	71

== Participating nations ==
- Belgium
- Brazil
- British Ceylon
- Denmark
- Egypt
- England
- Estonia
- France
- Finland
- India
- Latvia
- Luxembourg
- Monaco
- Netherlands
- Norway
- Palestine
- Poland
- Scotland
- Sweden
- Switzerland
- United States
- Wales
- Yugoslavia

== See also ==
- FISU World University Games § Precursors
- University and college sport
