= Bernard Deacon =

Bernard Deacon may refer to:

- Bernard Deacon (linguist), historian and linguist of Cornish
- Bernard Deacon (anthropologist) (1903–1927), social anthropologist
- Bernard Deacon (pole vaulter) (born 1911), 3rd in the pole vault at the 1940 USA Outdoor Track and Field Championships
