= Lee Todd =

Lee Todd may refer to:

- Lee T. Todd, Jr. (born 1946), former president of the University of Kentucky
- Lee Todd (footballer) (born 1972), English footballer
- Lee Todd (decathlete) (born 1915), decathlon runner-up at the 1940 USA Outdoor Track and Field Championships
