= Herschel Curry Smith =

American athletic coach

Compton College Coach Herschel Curry Smith

Herschel Curry Smith (1903–1983) was an American athletic coach in the sport of track and field at Compton Jr. College. He is also popularly known as the founder of the Compton Invitational, and the co-founder of the Los Angeles Invitational, both track meets located in Southern California, the United States of America. Smith was also a sprint athlete and world record holder. As a team member of the University of Southern California (USC) track team, in 1927 his relay team broke the world record in the 800-meter and 880-yard relay. Smith was the head coach of Compton College from 1928 to 1968 and was the founder of the Compton Invitational and its director from 1936 to 1969. Herschel was also the co-founder, with Al Franken, and the meet director of the first indoor track meet on the west coast. Known as the Los Angeles Invitational (1959), its name later (1969) developed into the primary sponsors name, the Sunkist Invitational. Smith coached many world-class athletes including record high-jumpers Cornelius Johnson and Charles Dumas. From 1940 to 1942, Smith served as president of the National Junior College Athletic Association (NJCAA).

== Early sprint life ==
USC sprinter Herschel Curry Smith

Herschel started his track and field career as a sprinter at San Fernando High School. In 1922 he won the California High School 100-yard championship and the California State 100 meters at 10.4 seconds. In 1923 he won both Southern California, CIF sprint titles including the 100 meters at 10.2 seconds and the National Interscholastic 220-yard title.

After high school, he continued his sprint career for four more years at the University of Southern California as a member of Dean Cromwell’s track team. While at USC, Smith's freshman year provided him with a first-place win at the Western Olympic trials in the 100 meter at 10.8 seconds and a 2nd-place finish in the 200 meter. Initially expected to make the 1924 Olympic team, illness prevented Smith from participating at the 1924 Paris Olympic Games. The following year 1925, he won the Junior National AAU Championship 100-yard dash in 9.8 seconds. Continuing in 1926 with the Trojans' track team, he enjoyed a winning season, helping the team win the ICAAAA National Championship. The following year was the peak of Smith’s on-field running accomplishments. As part of a relay foursome (Smith, House, Lewis, Borah), Smith participated in breaking the world record in the 800 meter and 880-yard relay (4×220) at 1:25.8 seconds, in Los Angeles on May 14, 1927.

== Track coach ==
In 1928 Smith became a coach at Compton Jr. College and High School (both included as one organization at the time) and began nourishing and producing track and field athletes. As a junior college, Compton provided a stepping stone for athletes to train and develop before progressing onto a major four-year college. Smith recruited the best athletes he could find from across the country and coached his protégés to top performance levels, helping win many championships for the college. In 1936, Herschel was the coach of high jump-Olympic record holder and gold medalist Cornelius Johnson. Later (1956) Herschel was the coach of world record holder and Olympic gold medalist Charles Dumas, the first person to high-jump over 7 feet (7 feet 1/2 inch). Compton's coaching program fostered and produced many other champions including later Olympic gold medalist Simeon Iness, Earlene Brown, Herman Ray Stokes, Jerome Walters, George Henry Brown, Jr., and George Jefferson. Other notable athletes from Compton’s program included Bill Bugbee, Wilbur Miller, Vic Williams, Bill Fell, Willie Attenberry, and Adrian Davis.

During Herschel’s 41-year tenure of coaching at Compton College his achievements included:

- 5 National Men’s Outdoor Track and Field Championships: 1939, 1947, 1949, 1950, 1951
- 14 conference championships
- 9 Southern California titles
- 2 track and field State Championships (California Community College Athletic Association) 1954, 1956

== Invitational founder, meet director and president of the NJCAA ==
Smith was the founder of The Compton Invitational Track Meet, held at the new Olympic venue the Los Angeles Memorial Coliseum in 1936, and was its director for 33 years until 1969. In 1959, when the Los Angeles Sports Arena opened, Herschel co-founded the first indoor track meet on the West Coast, The Los Angeles Invitational, which later (1969) became the Sunkist Invitational. Smith was also the meet director for the L.A. Invitational for several years. Both the Compton Invitational and the Los Angeles Invitational have featured many world-class athletes and record holders, including John Woodruff, Mal Whitfield, Herb McKenley, Wes Santee.

From 1940 to 1942, Herschel served as the president of the National Junior College Athletic Association (NJCAA) and was a strong advocate for the NJCAA broadening its scope to other sports in addition to track and field.

== Awards and honors ==
In 1991 Herschel was inducted into the California Community Colleges Hall of Fame, under the category of Track & Field/Cross Country.

On May 26, 2012, he was inducted into the Compton Community College Athletics Hall of Fame, under the category of Track & Field/Cross Country.

Other awards Herschel Smith received include:

- A USC Trojan Track and Field letterman in 1925, 1926, and 1927.
- Herschel has been recognized by the Southern California Track Writers with the Jess Mortenson Award.
- The recipient of the Helms Athletic Foundation Award for contributions to the sport.
- The recipient of the Trojan Coaches Club, Achievement Award, 1955.
- The recipient of the top award from the NJCAA in 1964–65, The Service Award.
