= Frederick Bowers =

Member of the Ohio House of Representatives from the 34th district
- In office 1951 – 1954
- Preceded by: None (First)
- Succeeded by: David Albritton

Personal details
- Born: December 11, 1909 Dayton, Ohio, U.S.
- Died: October 10, 1973 (aged 63) Dayton, Ohio, U.S.
- Party: Republican

Frederick Bowers was an American politician and former Republican member of the Ohio House of Representatives. He is the first African American to serve in the Ohio House of Representatives from Montgomery County, Ohio.

== Death and legacy ==
Frederick Bowers is buried at Woodland Cemetery and Arboretum in Dayton, Ohio.
