= 1934 USA Indoor Track and Field Championships =

National athletics championship event

- Dates: February 24 (men); April 14 (women)
- Host city: New York City, New York, United States (men); Brooklyn, New York, United States (women)
- Venue: Madison Square Garden (men); Second Battalion Naval Militia (women)
- Level: Senior
- Type: Indoor
- Events: 19 (12 men's + 7 women's)

The 1934 USA Indoor Track and Field Championships were organized by the Amateur Athletic Union (AAU) and served as the national championships in indoor track and field for the United States.

The men's edition was held at Madison Square Garden in New York City, New York, and it took place February 24. The women's meet was held separately at the Second Battalion Naval Militia in Brooklyn, New York, taking place April 14.

At the championships, Stella Walsh broke women's 200 metres world record while Rena MacDonald set a world record in the indoor 8 pounds (3.6 kg) shot put.

== Medal summary ==
=== Men ===
Event	Gold		Silver	Bronze
60 m	Ralph Metcalfe	6.7		
600 m	Milton Sandler	1:22.8		
1000 m	Charles Hornbostel	2:28.8		
1500 m	Glenn Cunningham	3:52.2		
5000 m	John Follows	15:01.5		
65 m hurdles	John Collier	8.8		
3000 m steeplechase (Note: For the indoor steeplechase, barriers were used but there was no water pit.)	Joe McCluskey	8:50		
High jump	Walter Marty	2.02 m		
High jump	George Spitz	2.02 m		
Pole vault	William Graber	4.19 m		
Long jump	Jesse Owens	7.70 m		
Shot put	Thomas Gilbane	15.11 m		
Weight throw	Henry Dreyer	16.35 m		
1500 m walk	Charles Eschenbach	6:14.8		

=== Women ===
Event	Gold		Silver	Bronze
50 m	Stella Walsh (POL)	7.0	Mildred Fizzell (CAN)	Louise Stokes
200 m	Stella Walsh (POL)	26.0	Annette Rogers	
50 m hurdles	Roxy Atkins (CAN)	8.2	Evelyne Hall	
High jump	Alice Arden	1.55 m		
Standing long jump	Dorothy Lyford	2.57 m		
Shot put	Margaret "Rena" MacDonald	12.47 m		
Basketball throw	Nan Gindele	95 ft 9 1/4 in (29.19 m)		
