= George Spitz =

American high jumper

George Burton Spitz, Jr. (June 19, 1912 – April 1986) was an American high jumper. He jumped indoor world records in 1931 and 1932 and was a leading favorite for that summer's Olympics; however, an ankle injury troubled him there and he only placed ninth.

== High jump career ==
=== Early years ===
Spitz became one of America's leading high jumpers while still at Flushing High School, placing fourth in the 1929 national championships with a jump of 1.89 m (6 ft 2 3/8 in). In March 1930 he jumped 1.94 m (6 ft 4 1/2 in), breaking the US high school record of Walter Marty. At the national championships he repeated his fourth-place finish from the previous year. He graduated from high school that spring and entered New York University.

Spitz set his first indoor world record on February 7, 1931 at the Millrose Games, jumping 2.00 m (6 ft 7 in) and defeating the previous record holders Harold Osborn and Bert Nelson. He also had the best outdoor jump in the world that year, clearing 2.01 m (6 ft 7 5/16 in) at Travers Island and attempting the world outdoor record height of 2.04 m (6 ft 8 3/8 in) three times. At the national championships, however, he only cleared 1.90 m (6 ft 3 in) and was yet again beaten to fourth place.

=== 1932 Olympic campaign ===
Spitz was the world's best high jumper in 1932. On February 6 he improved his own indoor world record to 2.02 m (6 ft 7 5/8 in), again at the Millrose Games. A week later at the Boston Athletic Association Indoor Games he broke the record again, jumping 2.04 m (6 ft 8 1/2 in), a mark that exceeded Osborn's outdoor world record as well. Spitz also won his first national indoor championship that year, clearing a meeting record 2.00 m (6 ft 7 in) on that occasion.

Spitz injured his ankle that spring, and while he remained in good form the injury gave him on-and-off trouble. He was forced to scratch from the annual meet of his own club, the New York Athletic Club, in early June. But he managed to return in time for the Olympic Trials, and after he jumped 2.03 m (6 ft 8 in) in workouts ahead of the Trials and 1.99 m (6 ft 6 5/8 in) in the competition itself, tying for first with Bob Van Osdel and Corny Johnson, he was again considered the leading Olympic favorite.

At the Olympics, however, the injured ankle bothered him again and he only managed to place ninth, clearing no higher than 1.90 m (6 ft 3 in).

=== Later career and decline ===
Spitz defended his national indoor title in 1933, jumping 2.03 m (6 ft 8 1/4 in) for a meeting record. At the outdoor championships, however, he was beaten by Johnson and shared second place with Marty, who had broken the outdoor world record earlier that year.

In 1934 Spitz's indoor supremacy was seriously threatened by Marty, who had never jumped indoors before. At the Millrose Games on February 5 Spitz and Marty tied, both jumping 2.00 m (6 ft 7 in). In the New York Athletic Club indoor games on February 17, however, Marty beat both Spitz and his indoor record, clearing 2.05 m (6 ft 8 3/4 in) on his third attempt. At the national indoor championships Spitz and Marty tied for first again, both clearing 2.01 m (6 ft 7 1/2 in) this time to share the title.

Although unable to improve his indoor best, Spitz made his best outdoor jumps that year. He won at the Penn Relays with a jump of 2.01 m (6 ft 7 1/4 in) and went an inch higher with an additional exhibition jump. He then cleared 2.03 m (6 ft 8 in) in his home meet at Travers Island, his official outdoor best. Spitz and Marty, both now collegiate seniors, faced each other again at the NCAA championships and again tied, although Marty was victorious in the jump-off. At the national championships Spitz cleared 2.02 m (6 ft 7 5/8 in), but had to be content with third place as both Johnson and Marty managed to jump an inch higher.

Spitz continued his jumping career after graduating, but with decreasing success. At the 1935 national championships he still placed second to Johnson, clearing 1.98 m (6 ft 6 in). At the 1936 Olympic Trials he only managed 1.93 m (6 ft 4 in), sharing fourth place with six other jumpers.

=== Jumping style ===
Spitz jumped in an era in which most jumpers from the American west coast (such as Marty) used the western roll, whereas east coast jumpers tended to prefer the eastern cut-off or other developments of the old scissors style. Spitz, a New Yorker, belonged to the latter group, although his technique was largely self-taught and incorporated elements of the roll.
