= Los Angeles Invitational =

Former elite level indoor track meet

The Los Angeles Invitational was an elite level indoor track meet, held in the Los Angeles Sports Arena in Los Angeles, California. For 25 years (1970 to 1995) the event was sponsored by the hometown Sunkist Growers, Incorporated who assumed title sponsorship and the event was known as the Sunkist Invitational. The meet was promoted by Al Franken (not the comedian/U.S. Senator), later with the help of his son Don under the banner of Franken Enterprises. Franken co-founded the meet along with coach Herschel Curry Smith. It was usually held in early to mid-February, was frequently televised nationally, and was an elite level stop between the Millrose Games and the USA Indoor Track and Field Championships. In addition to attracting the top elite athletes which dominated the evening schedule, it was an all day event featuring the top high school runners (all running unattached to conform to CIF rules), just before the official track season began. The event was cancelled before its 44th edition in 2004, due to lack of sponsorship. Before its demise, it claimed to be the second longest running indoor track meet in the United States. They also claim 105 Olympic gold medalists among their alumni and many other elite athletes participated in the meet. Several still standing World, American and other national records were set at the meet.
