= Roxy Atkins =

Canadian and American track and field athlete (1912–2002)

Personal information
- Full name: Edna Roxanne Andersen
- Born: Edna Roxanne Atkins; June 26, 1912 Montreal, Quebec, Canada
- Died: September 6, 2002 (aged 90) San Francisco, California, U.S.
- Height: 160 cm (5 ft 3 in)

Sport
- Sport: Track and field
- Event: 80 metres hurdles
- Club: Toronto Ladies Track Club

Edna Roxanne Andersen (née Atkins, June 26, 1912 – September 6, 2002) was a Canadian and American track and field athlete. She won a gold medal at the 1934 USA Indoor Track and Field Championships and a silver medal at the 1936 US Indoor Championships. Apart from competing in athletics, Andersen was the Pacific chair of the Amateur Athletic Union from 1950 to 1976. In 1991, Andersen was inducted into the National Track and Field Hall of Fame.

== Personal life ==
On June 26, 1912, Andersen was born in Montreal, Quebec.

Andersen died in San Francisco, California on September 6, 2002. Andersen was married with no children.

== Career ==
Andersen began her athletic career with the Canadian Ladies Athletic Club. She broke the Canadian record in the 80 metres hurdles event in 1932 and won gold in the Canadian hurdles championship in 1935. Additional records that Andersen held were in the 50 metres hurdles and 90 yards hurdles events. Competing in the United States, Andersen won gold at the 1934 USA Indoor Track and Field Championships and silver at the 1936 USA Indoor Championships. In international competitions, she participated in the 1934 British Empire Games, the 1934 Women's World Games, and the 1936 Summer Olympics.

After World War II, Andersen went to California with her husband and became an American citizen. She served as the Pacific district chair of the Amateur Athletic Union from 1950 to 1976. With the United States national track and field team, she worked with the team at the 1956 Summer Olympics, 1971 Pan American Games and 1983 Pan American Games.

== Awards and honors ==
Andersen was inducted into the USA National Track and Field Hall of Fame in 1991.
