= Walter Marty =

Walter George Marty
Personal information
- Born: August 15, 1910
- Died: April 25, 1995 (aged 84)

Sport
- Sport: Athletics
- Event: High jump
Medal record
Men's Athletics
Representing United States
Silver medal – second place	1931 Senior Championships	High jump
Gold medal – first place	1934 Indoor Championships	High jump
Gold medal – first place	1934 NCAA Championships	High jump
Gold medal – first place	1934 Senior Championships	High jump

Walter George Marty (August 15, 1910 – April 25, 1995) was an American high jumper. He set both indoor and outdoor world records in his speciality and was national co-champion both indoors and outdoors in his peak year of 1934.

== High jump career ==
=== Early career ===
As a student at Fresno High School, Marty jumped 6 ft 4 1/4 in (1.93 m) at the 1929 West Coast Relays, setting a United States high school record; only five athletes of any age jumped higher that year. Marty duplicated the mark in the Los Angeles Memorial Coliseum while winning the 1929 CIF California State Meet. In 1930 Marty was national junior champion and represented the United States in a dual meet against the British Empire; he cleared a personal best 6 ft 5 1/4 in (1.96 m) in that meet and won ahead of national senior champion Anton Burg.

In June 1931 Marty cleared a personal best 6 ft 6 3/8 in (1.99 m) at the inaugural Kern County Relays in Taft; at the national (AAU) senior championships three weeks later he jumped 6 ft 4 3/8 in (1.94 m) and placed second to Burg, who defended his title. Marty was selected to tour South Africa that fall as one of nine American track and field athletes. In Queenstown he cleared 6 ft 6 3/4 in (2.00 m) for a new South African all-comers record; it was the second-best jump in the world that summer, behind George Spitz at 6 ft 7 5/16 in (2.01 m).

Marty remained in good form in 1932; he cleared 6 ft 6 1/2 in (1.99 m) at the Far Western Conference meet in Sacramento, leading Fresno State College to a conference title. Marty also won at the Olympic Trials semi-finals in Long Beach, jumping 6 ft 6 in (1.98 m). He was considered one of the favorites to make the 1932 Olympic team but narrowly missed out; at the final Olympic Trials in Palo Alto he cleared 6 ft 5 5/8 (1.97 m) and placed shared fourth as the top three qualified.

=== Peak and decline ===
In 1933 and 1934 Marty was the world's leading high jumper, setting several new world records. He set his first world record at the West Coast Relays in Fresno on May 13, 1933, clearing 6 ft 8 5/8 in (2.04 m) and breaking Harold Osborn's outdoor world record from 1924. Marty's main rivals at his peak were Spitz and Cornelius Johnson; Spitz held the indoor world record of 6 ft 8 1/2 in (2.04 m), while Johnson was a consistent competitor with excellent head-to-head records against both Spitz and Marty. Johnson won the 1933 AAU title with a jump of 6 ft 7 in (2.00 m), ahead of Marty, who shared second place with Spitz.

Marty competed indoors for the first time in the winter of 1934; until then, he'd been purely an outdoor jumper. At the New York Athletic Club's indoor games on February 17 he jumped 6 ft 8 3/4 in (2.05 m) to set a new indoor world record and defeat previous record holder Spitz, who was second. In the AAU indoor meet later that winter Marty cleared 6 ft 7 1/2 in (2.01 m) and shared the championship with Spitz. Marty's 1934 outdoor shape was also record-breaking; on April 7 he jumped 6 ft 9 1/2 in (2.07 m) in a dual meet between Fresno State and Sacramento Junior College, but the jump couldn't be recognized as a new record as no AAU officials were present to ratify it. Three weeks later he cleared 6 ft 9 1/8 in (2.06 m) in a dual meet against Stanford, his second official outdoor world mark.

Marty was then briefly sidelined by a bruised knee but returned in time for the NCAA championships in Los Angeles, where he tied for first with Spitz at 6 ft 6 3/4 in (2.00 m). Marty also tied for first, with Johnson, at the 1934 AAU outdoor meet; the two cleared 6 ft 8 5/8 in (2.04 m) for a new meeting record.

A hernia kept Marty out of action for most of 1935, and he was expected to retire; however, after a successful operation he attempted a comeback in 1936. He almost managed to regain his 1934 form, clearing 6 ft 8 3/4 in (2.05 m) in May 1936 and even exceeding his world record in training. He was favored to qualify for the United States' 1936 Olympic team, but at the Olympic Trials he only cleared 6 ft 4 in (1.93 m), again placing shared fourth and missing out. The top two - Johnson and Dave Albritton - both sailed over 6 ft 9 3/4 in (2.07 m), breaking Marty's world record. The American team of Johnson, Albritton and Delos Thurber went on to sweep the Olympic medals.

=== Technique ===
Marty used the high jump technique known as the Western roll, pioneered in the early 1910s by George Horine and Edward Beeson. At the time, there were two main jumping styles; Marty (and other west coast jumpers, like Johnson) used the roll, whereas east coast jumpers (such as Spitz) mostly used the Eastern cut-off or other developments of the old scissors jump.

Records
Preceded by (United States) Harold Osborn	World record holder in men's high jump 13 May 1933 – 12 July 1936	Succeeded by (United States) Cornelius Johnson (United States) Dave Albritton
Preceded by (United States) George Spitz	World indoor record holder in men's high jump 17 February 1934 – 22 February 1936	Succeeded by (United States) Ed Burke (United States) Cornelius Johnson
