= Rena MacDonald =

American shot putter and discus thrower (1907–1958)

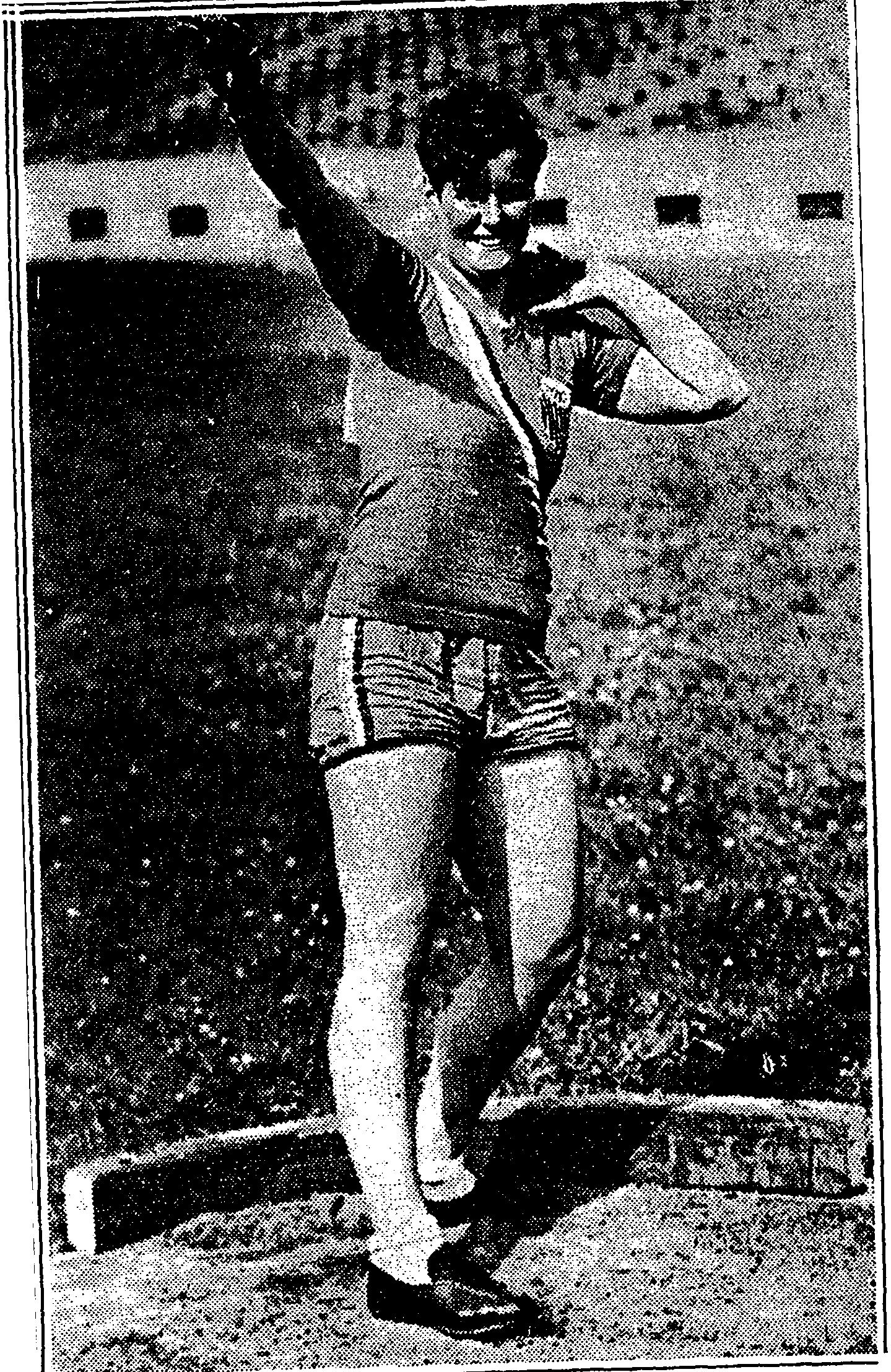
- MacDonald in 1929

Personal information
- Nationality: American
- Born: September 1, 1904 Nova Scotia, Canada
- Died: November 16, 1958 (aged 51)

Sport
- Sport: Athletics
- Events: Shot put, discus throw

Margaret Catherine "Rena" MacDonald (April 3, 1907 – November 16, 1958) was an American athlete. She was born in Nova Scotia, Canada. Her family moved to Massachusetts in 1910 and lived in Dedham. MacDonald became a naturalized US citizen in 1925. She joined the Boston Swimming Association. A versatile athlete, MacDonald competed in swimming and track and field events.

MacDonald first competed at the AAU women's national outdoor track and field championships in 1926, finishing second in the 8lb shot put to Lillian Copeland. She won the national outdoor title three times: in 1929–30 and in 1935. In 1929, MacDonald also won the national outdoor discus title. She won AAU indoor shot put titles in 1927 and 1929–34.

Following the 1928 women's national track and field championships held on 4 July in New Jersey, where she competed in both the shot put and the discus, MacDonald was one of four women selected to compete in the women's discus throw at the 1928 Summer Olympics in Amsterdam. It was the first time women competed in track and field events at the Olympics. There was no shot put event. MacDonald finished fifteenth and Copeland won the silver medal. The 1932 women's national track and field championships held on 16 July in Evanston, Illinois, were the trials for the 1932 Summer Olympics in Los Angeles. MacDonald was second in the 8lb shot put to Mildred Didrikson but was not selected as the shot put was not one of the women's events at the 1932 Olympic Games. The only throwing events for women were discus and javelin.

MacDonald set a world record in winning the shot put at the 1934 USA Indoor Track and Field Championships.

Later in life, MacDonald moved to Pittsfield, Massachusetts, where she was a swimming teacher at the Girls Club. She was employed by the Elmvale Worsted Co.
