= Bob Simmons =

Bob Simmons may refer to:

- Bob Simmons (stunt man) (1923–1987), renowned stunt man for the James Bond film series
- Bob Simmons (surfer) (1919–1954), early surfing pioneer
- Bob Simmons (offensive lineman) (born 1954), American football player
- Bob Simmons (American football coach) (1948–2026), American football coach for Oklahoma State
- B.o.B (Bobby Ray Simmons, Jr., born 1988), rapper

== See also ==
- Robert Simmons (disambiguation)
- Bobby Simmons (born 1980), basketball player
