= Robert Simmons (prisoner) =

African American conscientious objector

- Born: October 28, 1890; Savannah, Georgia, United States
- Other name: Robert A. Simmons
- Occupations: laborer, soldier

Robert Simmons was an African American conscientious objector and anti-war activist who was imprisoned on Alcatraz Island shortly after World War I.

== Biography ==
Simmons was born on October 28, 1890 in Savannah, Georgia.

On his 27th birthday in 1917, Simmons was drafted into the U.S. Army as a stevedore. In late 1918, Simmons sought conscientious objector status while in France, having been sent over as a member of Company C, 323rd Labor Battalion; On September 13, he refused to perform his typical duties (cutting down trees for fuel), citing religious objections to performing any labor while in the uniform of an enlisted soldier. His continued refusal led to his arrest, military court-martial, and a 10-year prison sentence at the United States Disciplinary Barracks in Fort Leavenworth, Kansas in January, 1919. While there, he was registered as general prisoner #17417. On August 5, 1919, Simmons was among a group of around 130 prisoners that were transferred to the Pacific Branch of the United States Disciplinary Barracks, located on Alcatraz Island, where he would arrive on August 11 as general prisoner #11821.

Simmons faced harsh punishment and extended sentences due to his being considered an "absolutist" contentious objector, a classification he received through his refusal to follow any subsequent military orders or perform any kind of work. During his imprisonment, Simmons was held in solitary confinement in "the hole" for 14 days. As with other absolutists, Simmons was frequently disciplined by being forced to stand in a smaller sub-cell where he would be chained to the cell door and would be unable to sit or turn around for a total of eight hours each day, the duration of the work day for the island's other prisoners.

Simmons' incarceration was subject to wide criticism and protest among the African American community and civil rights groups. The National Civil Liberties Bureau formally petitioned the U.S. military for the release of Simmons, which reached U.S. Secretary of War Newton D. Baker.

Despite the Armistice of November 11, 1918, Simmons remained imprisoned at Alcatraz until February 27, 1920. During the duration of his sentence, Simmons spent a total of 84 days in solitary confinement, the maximum limit under U.S. Army regulations at the time. After his release, it was reported Simmons relocated to Southern California to live with his mother.

The Messenger wrote that Simmons' "gentle sturdiness had gained for him the respect of inmates and guards alike."

== Legacy ==
Simmons is featured in an exhibit in the Alcatraz Dining Hall titled "The Big Lockup: Incarceration in the United States."

== Gallery ==
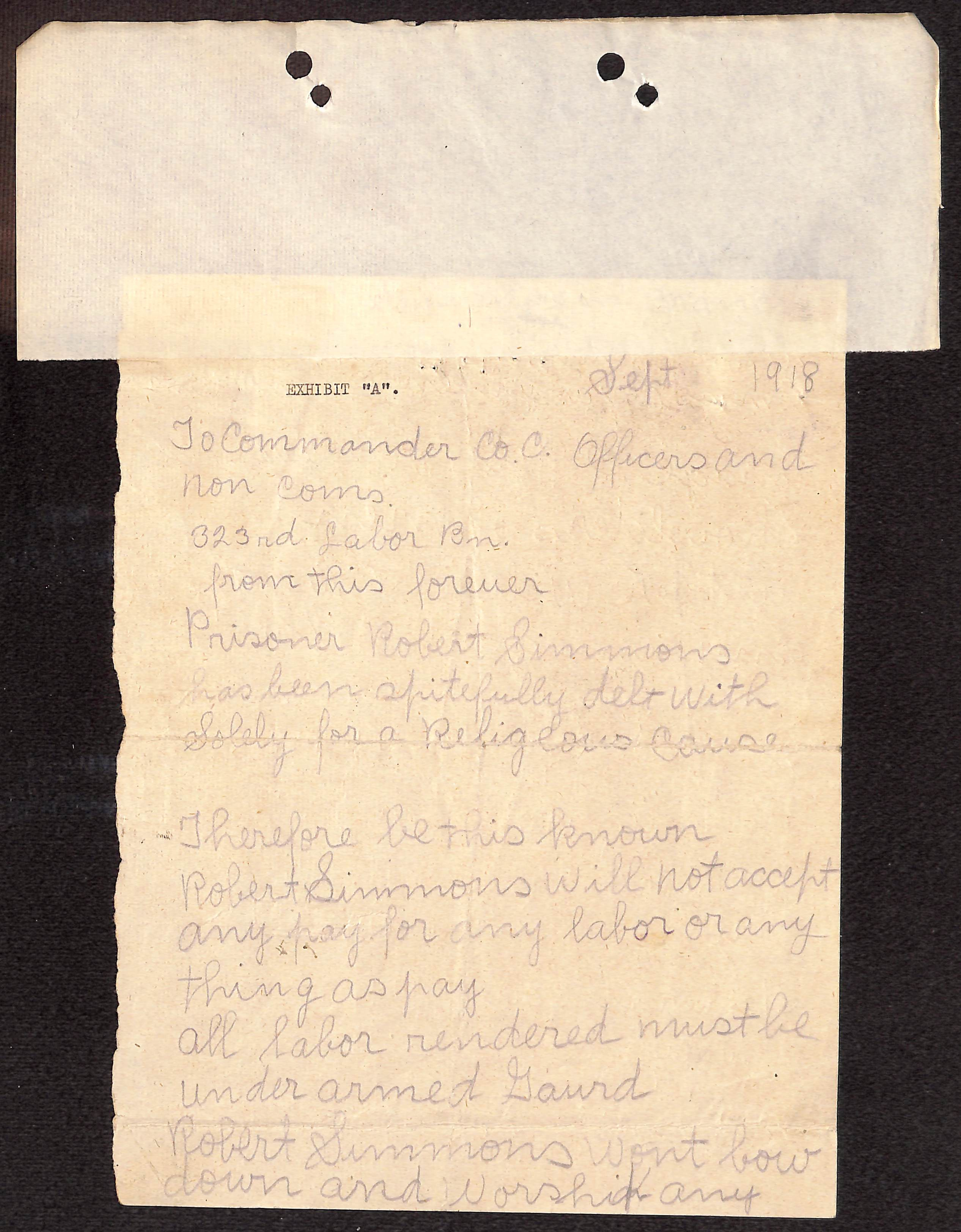
The front of a letter, presented as Exhibit A in his GCM trial, describing his motivations as a conscientious objector.

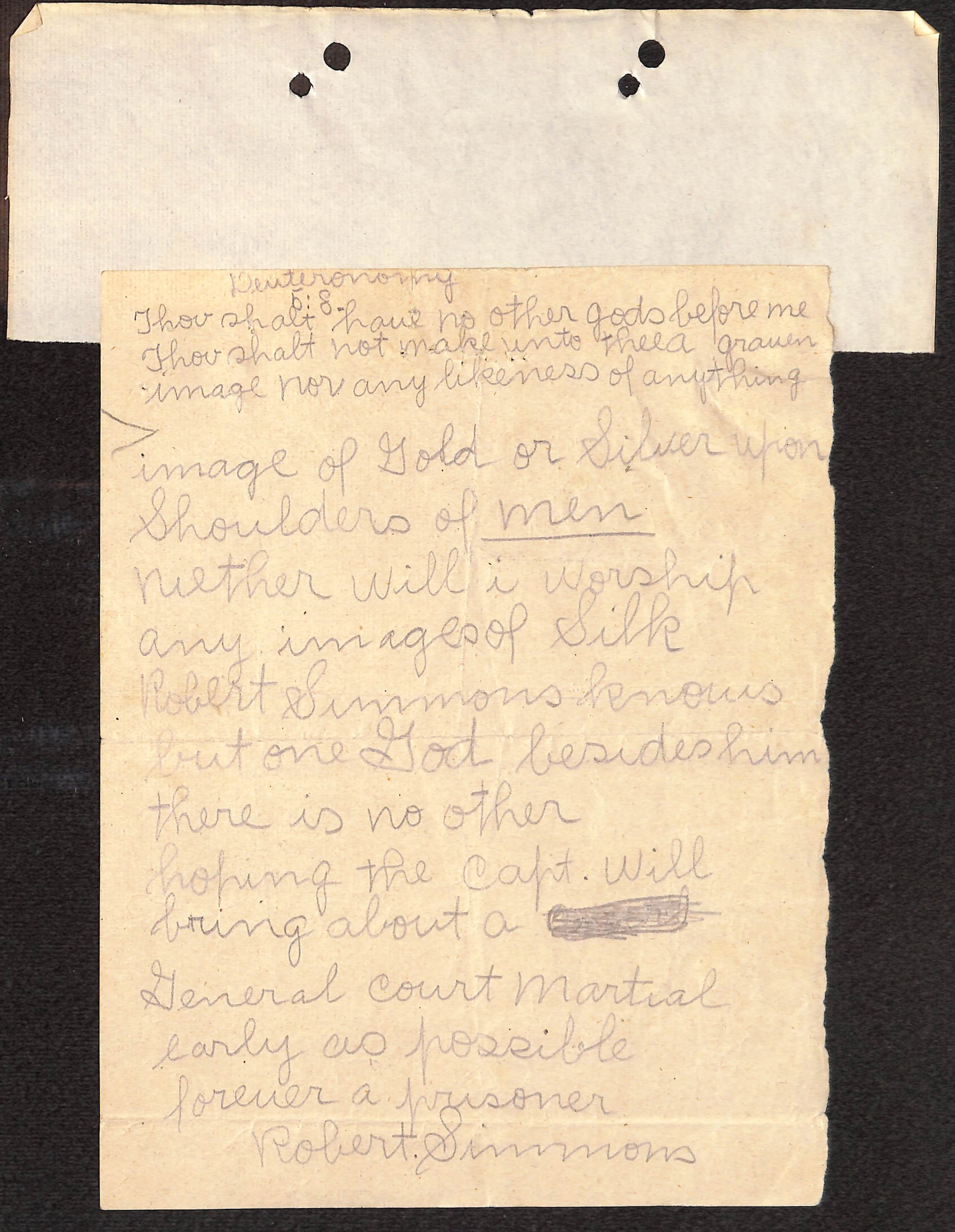
The back of a letter, presented as Exhibit A in his GCM trial, describing his motivations as a conscientious objector.

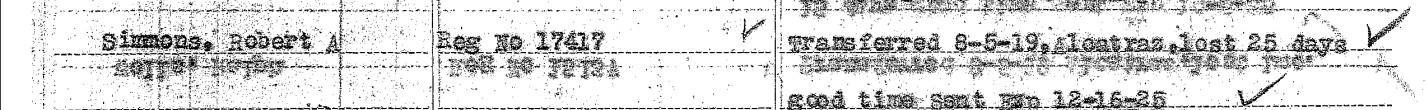
Simmons' entry in the monthly prisoner report for USDB Leavenworth, August 1919.

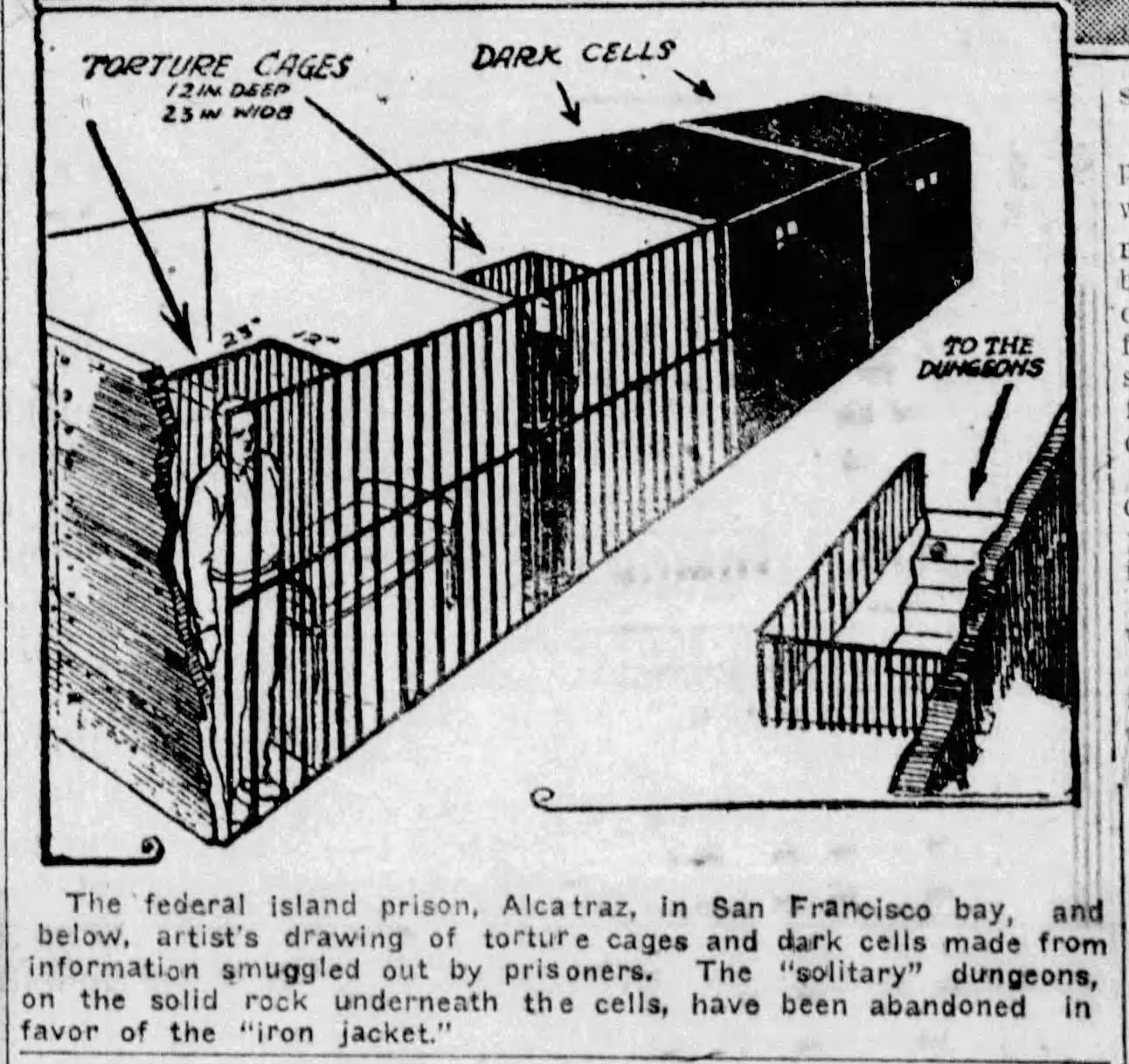
Depictions of the "torture cages" on Alcatraz Island, February 1920.
