= Robert Simmons (South Carolina politician) =

South Carolina reconstruction era American politician

South Carolina State Senate
- In office 1882–1886

Personal details
- Born: c. 1850 Colleton County, South Carolina
- Party: Republican

Robert Simmons (born c. 1850) was a farmer and state legislator who served in the South Carolina State Senate from 1882 until 1886.

== Biography ==
Simmons was born about 1850 in the Colleton District of South Carolina and he attended school after the American Civil War on Saint Helens's Island. He then started working as a farmer on Wadmalaw Island south of Charleston.

In 1870 he served on the Republican executive committee representing Charlestons third ward and was also a Berkeley County school trustee. Simmons also served in the state militia obtaining the rank of captain and serving from 1872 until 1877. He represented Wadmalaw Island as a delegate to the Republican Convention in 1872.

Then in 1876 he was elected to the South Carolina House of Representatives to represent Berkeley County but never took his seat in the house.

Simmons was then elected to the South Carolina State Senate where he served in the 55th General Assembly from 1882 until 1883 and then in the 56th General Assembly from 1884 until 1886 with the last session on December 24, 1885, both times representing Berkeley County.

He made a run for the United States Congress in 1888 as an independent but was not successful only receiving 74 votes compared to the winner Democrat William Elliott who got 8358 votes.

== See also ==
- African American officeholders from the end of the Civil War until before 1900
