= Jeanine Toulouse =

French sprinter (1923–2020)

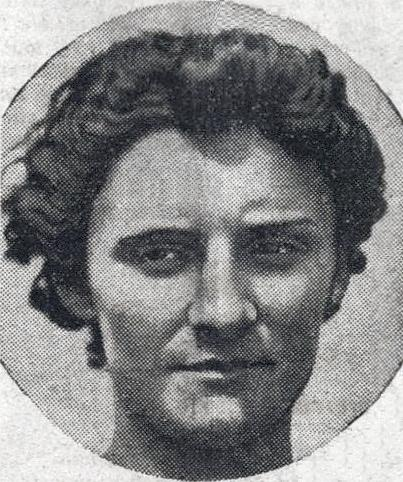
- Toulouse in 1941

Personal information
- Nationality: France
- Born: 16 May 1923 Lesparre-Médoc
- Died: 29 December 2020 (aged 97)

Sport
- Event: Sprint (running)

Jeanine Salagoïty (born Toulouse; 16 May 1923 – 29 December 2020) was a French athlete who specialised in the sprints.

== Biography ==
Salagoïty was born in Lesparre-Médoc. She won ten champion of France titles from 1939 to 1949: three in the 60 meters, four in the 100 meters and three in the 200 meters . She twice improved the French record in the 100 meters (12.1s in 1948 and 12.0s in 1949), as well as the 4 × 100 Metres Relay. She participated in the 1948 Olympics in London, where she reached the semi-finals of the 80m hurdles.

=== Achievements ===
- French Championships in Athletics :
  - winner of 60 m 1939, 1946 and 1949
  - winner of the 100m 1941, 1942, 1945 and 1949
  - winner of 200 m 1941, 1942 and 1945

=== Records ===
personal records
Event	Performance	Location	Date
100 m	12.0s		1949
200 m	26.2s		1941
