= Harold Osborn =

American athletics competitor

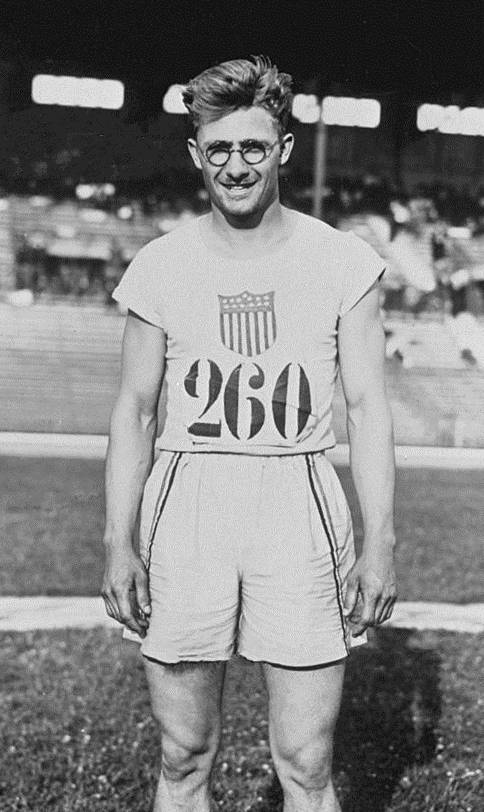
- Osborn at the 1924 Olympics

Personal information
- Full name: Harold Marion Osborn
- Born: April 13, 1899 Butler, Illinois, USA
- Died: April 5, 1975 (aged 75) Champaign, Illinois, USA
- Education: University of Illinois
- Height: 5 ft 11 in (1.81 m)
- Weight: 161 lb (73 kg)

Sport
- Sport: Athletics
- Events: High jump, triple jump, decathlon
- Club: Illinois Athletic Club, Chicago

Achievements and titles
- Personal bests: HJ – 2.038 m (1924); TJ – 14.27 m (1921); Decathlon – 6476 (1924)
Medal record
Representing the United States
Olympic Games
Gold medal – first place	1924 Paris	High jump
Gold medal – first place	1924 Paris	Decathlon

Harold Marion Osborn D.O. (April 13, 1899 – April 5, 1975) was an American track athlete. He won a gold medal in Olympic decathlon and high jump in 1924 and was the first athlete to win a gold medal in both the decathlon and an individual event.

== Biography ==
After high school, Osborn attended the University of Illinois from 1919 through 1922, majoring in agriculture, where he was a founding member of the Eta chapter of Kappa Delta Rho fraternity. Both of Osborns parents were of entirely English ancestry. All of Osborn's ancestors came to North America from England and all of them emigrated to the Province of Massachusetts Bay before the year 1700. Osborn was descended from Richard Sears, John Underhill, Myles Standish, George Soule and John Woodbridge.

Osborn won gold medals and set Olympic records in both the high jump and the decathlon at the 1924 Olympics. His 6'6" high jump remained the Olympic record for 12 years, while his decathlon score of 7,710.775 points also set a new world record, and resulted in worldwide press coverage calling him the "world's greatest athlete."

On May 27, 1924, Osborn's 6' 8-¼" (=2m 03.835 cm) high jump set a world record at an AAU meet held at the University of Illinois campus in Urbana. The following year Osborn won the British AAA Championships title in the high jump event at the 1925 AAA Championships. At the same Championships he finished second behind Elemér Somfay in the triple jump event.

Osborn competed in the Olympics again in 1928. In the high jump, four competitors tied for second place. The initial tying jumps for second place were 6' 3- ½", just an inch behind gold medalist, Bob King, who jumped 6' 4½".

== Titles and records ==
Osborn won 17 national titles and set six world records during his career. He held world indoor records in the standing hop, step, and jump; the 60-yard high hurdles; and the running high jump. His holds the world record in the standing high jump of 5' 5¾" which he achieved at the age of 37. Osborn was enshrined as a charter member of the National Track and Field Hall of Fame in 1974. He modified the Western roll technique by developing an efficient side‑to‑the‑bar clearance, which resulted in more height and consistency.

== Sources ==
- USA Track and Field website http://www.usatf.org/
- The Complete Book of the Summer Olympics, 1996 Edition, Sports Illustrated.
- Olympic Trials Website http://www.legacy.usatf.org/statistics/OlympicTrialsStats2004.pdf
- The Olympics Fact Book http://www.Rediff.com/
- Article from July 18, 1996 – The Hillsboro Journal, Hillsboro, Illinois
- Obituary – Chicago Tribune, Thursday, April 10, 1975
- Reminiscences of Margaret Bordner Osborn to Marianna Trekell and family members
- Letters written by Harold Osborn to Margaret Bordner in 1925 (copies in possession of author; original letters in possession of Osborn's daughters).
- Trekell, Marianna, and White, Cyril M., unpublished manuscript titled "Harold M. Osborn at the Games of the VIII Olympiad Paris, 1925," written in the 1980s. Trekell was a faculty member in the Dept. of Physical Education at the University of Illinois, Champaign-Urbana. White was a sociologist at University College, Dublin, Ireland, with an academic interest in the Sociology of Sport.
- Article from the Illinois Alumni News, September 1974, titled "Dublin Remembers Harold Osborn '22".
- Hansen, Willard, Champaign-Urbana News-Gazette, Urbana, Illinois, April 25, 1975.
- Sports News, Christian Science Monitor, Boston, May 9, 1944, "Osborn Still Clears 6 Feet Long After Leaving College."
- Murray, Feg, "Crossing the Bar," newspaper clipping dated February 16, 1926, University of Illinois Archives—Harold M. Osborn file. Released through Metropolitan Newspaper Service.
- Letter written by Osborn to Volker Kluge, January 31, 1969, in possession of Osborn's niece, Emily Osborn.

Records
Preceded by (Estonia) Aleksander Klumberg	Men's Decathlon World Record Holder; July 12, 1924 – July 18, 1926	Succeeded by (Finland) Paavo Yrjölä
Preceded by (United States) Edward Beeson	Men's High Jump World Record Holder; May 27, 1924 – May 13, 1933	Succeeded by (United States) Walter Marty
