= Richard Ganslen =

American track and field athlete

Richard V. Ganslen (February 15, 1917 – May 12, 1995 in Denton, Texas) was an American track and field athlete specializing in the pole vault but also was a top athlete in the long jump and triple jump. He used his knowledge from being an active participant in the sport to author several technical manuals. While competing for Columbia University, he was the American national indoor champion in 1938 and the 1939 NCAA Champion in the pole vault. He also set the school records in the long jump and triple jump which lasted for 13 and 15 years respectively. Those marks are still #3 and #4 on Columbia's all-time list. In 1936, he had been the Junior National Champion. He continued to vault into masters age divisions until at least age 63. Sports Illustrated called him the "world's leading authority on pole-vaulting."

Ganslen continued his education at Springfield College. There, his 1940 masters thesis became the first edition of A Mechanical Analysis of the Pole Vault The book established him as the foremost authority on pole vaulting. It was revised and at least nine versions were published into the 1980s. he book was translated into German and Russian. Even though the event has been through major technical evolutions (with steel, aluminum and fiberglass composite poles), the book with its further adaptations is still used as a reference. He was a consultant in the initial design of fiberglass vaulting poles, authoring a paper on "Pole Flexibility."

"Actually, the principle of the flexible pole is nothing new. The bamboo pole was just as flexible as fiber glass, and you didn't see anyone trying to take them away from vaulters like Ozolin of Russia in 1928 or Oe and Nishida of Japan in 1932. Oe and Nishida placed second and third in the 1932 Olympics using exquisitely thin bamboo poles especially selected for their flexibility and just as flexible as fiber glass. With the fiber-glass pole, the vaulter does less work at the start but must do much more at the end. It's still the man on the end of the pole that counts."

Ganslen had learned some of his vaulting technique from friendship with Sueo Ōe who he met on an AAU international tour. Just a couple of years later their countries were at war. Even though Ganslen was one of the top American vaulters, there were no Olympics in his future as the 1940 Summer Olympics were cancelled.

He entered the Army in 1942 at the outbreak of World War II as a lieutenant in the Signal Corps. While stationed at Camp Crowder at the Signal Corps School in Missouri he continued to compete for the Army Track Team, travelling extensively. From there he went to The Army Language School in California. Overseas he was stationed in China near the Burma/India Road for the remainder of the war. At times the military would organize competitions in Track and Field and Ganslen competed in them when possible. Details reported in the China Lantern 1944. He was promoted to Captain while in China. Ganslen kept a journal which describes the battles waging all around him while continuing to keep the post functioning. After the war he remained in the Army Reserves as an intelligence officer, retiring as a Lt. Colonel.

After military service he received his PhD in physiology and kinesiology from the University of Illinois. He was a professor of anatomy, physiology and zoology at Rutgers University, the University of Illinois, University of Arkansas, U.C.L.A. and Texas Woman's University. Starting in 1963 he worked for NASA on the Gemeni Space Program.

Ganslen wrote Aerodynamics of Javelin Flight and Aerodynamics of the Discus and was also a co-author of The Mitigation of Physical Fatigue with "spartase". His work at NASA led him to write Effects of some tranquilizing, analeptic and vasodilating drugs on physical work capacity and orthostatic tolerance

He is buried at Fort Sam Houston National Cemetery.
