= Joe Scott (basketball player) =

American basketball player (1916–1971)

Personal information
- Born: April 22, 1916 Ohio, U.S.
- Died: May 25, 1971 (aged 55) Pepper Pike, Ohio, U.S.
- Listed height: 6 ft 5 in (1.96 m)
- Listed weight: 170 lb (77 kg)

Career information
- High school: Elyria (Elyria, Ohio)
- College: Case Western Reserve (1939–1940)
- Position: Power forward / center

Career history
- 1945–1946: Cleveland Allmen Transfers

Joseph F. Scott (April 22, 1916 – May 25, 1971) was an American professional basketball player. He played for the Cleveland Allmen Transfers in the National Basketball League during the 1945–46 season and averaged 2.5 points per game.

Scott was also a standout track athlete. He won the decathlon at the USA Outdoor Track and Field Championships (a 10-event test to determine the best athlete in the country) in New York City in 1938, and successfully defended his title a year later in Cleveland, Ohio.
