= Charles Beetham =

American middle-distance runner (1914–1997)

Charles Beetham (April 30, 1914 – January 28, 1997) was an American middle-distance runner. He was United States champion in the 800-meter run in 1936, 1939, 1940 and 1941 and NCAA champion in 1936; he entered the 1936 United States Olympic Trials as one of the favorites, but fell in the final and failed to qualify for the Olympics.

== Early life and collegiate career ==
Beetham was born in Cadiz, Ohio on April 30, 1914. He studied at North High School in Columbus, Ohio and became a good runner there, guided by his older brother Rupert. (Note: Rupert Beetham was also a good half-miler; in 1930 he placed second behind Edwin Genung at the United States championships.) After graduating from high school Beetham attended Ohio State University, where he was coached by Larry Snyder; his teammates included Jesse Owens and Dave Albritton. He was a sit-and-kick runner whose usual approach was to wait in the pack and outsprint his opponents at the end.

As a sophomore at Ohio State, Beetham won the 1935 Big Ten championship in the 880-yard (804.7 m) run. He also won the 880 yards in a dual meet against the University of Southern California on June 15, 1935; his winning time, 1:52.0, was the fastest in the world that year. Beetham entered the 1935 NCAA championships as the favorite, but dropped out early on the second lap.

In 1936 Beetham defended his Big Ten half-mile title in a meeting record 1:52.4 and won the NCAA 800-meter championship in 1:53.0. At the national outdoor championships of the Amateur Athletic Union (AAU) a week before the Olympic Trials Beetham won a close race against John Woodruff; his winning time, 1:50.3, broke Ben Eastman's meeting record by one-tenth of a second.

The 1936 United States Olympic Trials were held at Randall's Island Stadium in New York City; Beetham entered the 800 meters as a leading favorite. He qualified for the Trials final by placing fourth in his heat. In the final, Beetham stayed in the middle of the pack for the first lap; as he started his kick early on the second lap, he was spiked by Marmaduke Hobbs and fell, losing his chances to make the Olympic team. He did not finish the race, which was won by Woodruff; his appeal for a solo time-trial re-run was turned down.

In 1937, his final year at Ohio State, Beetham repeated as Big Ten half-mile champion both indoors and outdoors; his winning time in the outdoor meet, 1:52.2, broke his own meeting record from the previous year. He placed third at the 1937 NCAA championships as Woodruff won in a fast race; Beetham's time, 1:50.8 for 880 yards, was his lifetime best.

== Later life ==
Beetham continued running after graduating from Ohio State. He placed fifth in the AAU 800 meters in 1937 and third in 1938, but regained the championship in 1939; his winning time was 1:51.7. He also won in 1940 (1:51.1) and 1941 (1:50.2), becoming a four-time national outdoor champion; in addition, he won the 600 meters at the 1939 AAU indoor championships. In August 1939 he anchored an American 4 × 800 metres relay team to an unofficial world record of 7:35.2 in a race against the French team in Paris.

Beetham lost another opportunity to qualify for the Olympics when the 1940 Summer Games were cancelled due to World War II. He enlisted in the United States Navy after the Japanese attack on Pearl Harbor, but continued running; in 1945 he won the 880 yards at the Millrose Games and was awarded the Wanamaker Trophy as the outstanding performer of the meet.

After the war Beetham took up coaching; he was assistant coach of the Ohio State Buckeyes track team from 1946 to 1966. He was inducted in the Ohio State Varsity "O" Hall of Fame in 1981. Beetham died on January 28, 1997.
