= Eulace Peacock =

American track and field athlete (1914–1996)

Personal information
- Born: August 27, 1914 Dothan, Alabama
- Died: December 13, 1996 (aged 82) Yonkers, New York

Sport
- Country: United States
- Sport: Track and field
- Events: 100m, long jump, pentathlon

Eulace Peacock (August 27, 1914 – December 13, 1996) was an American track and field athlete in the 1930s.

== Early life ==
Peacock was born in Dothan, Alabama on 27 August 1914. He was raised in the Vauxhall section of Union Township, New Jersey, where he graduated from Union High School in 1933.

== Career ==
=== Track and field ===
Peacock set the New Jersey high school record in 1933 with a long jump of 24 feet 4.25 inches (7.42 m) that was on the books for 44 years until Renaldo Nehemiah jumped 24 feet 11 inches (7.59 m)

He became a rival to Jesse Owens in many sprinting competitions. He broke the high school record in the long jump the same day it was bettered by Owens. "I had that record for two hours." He attended Temple University in Philadelphia where he became a member of Alpha Phi Alpha. Competing for the Temple Owls track and field program, he set school records in the long jump and sprints that lasted over 50 years. Peacock won the Amateur Athletic Union (AAU) outdoor pentathlon championship six times, in 1934, 1935, 1937, and from 1943 through 1945.

He was a sprinting prodigy, who bested the notable prodigy of his time, Owens, on several occasions. A victory by Peacock over Owens in a July 1935 meet in Lincoln, Nebraska led The New York Times to say that "Peacock's star still is in the ascendancy" under the headline "Peacock's Victories Over Owens Project Duel for Olympic Fame" After pulling a hamstring muscle, he was unable to qualify for the 1936 Summer Olympics in Berlin, Germany.

=== Post-running ===
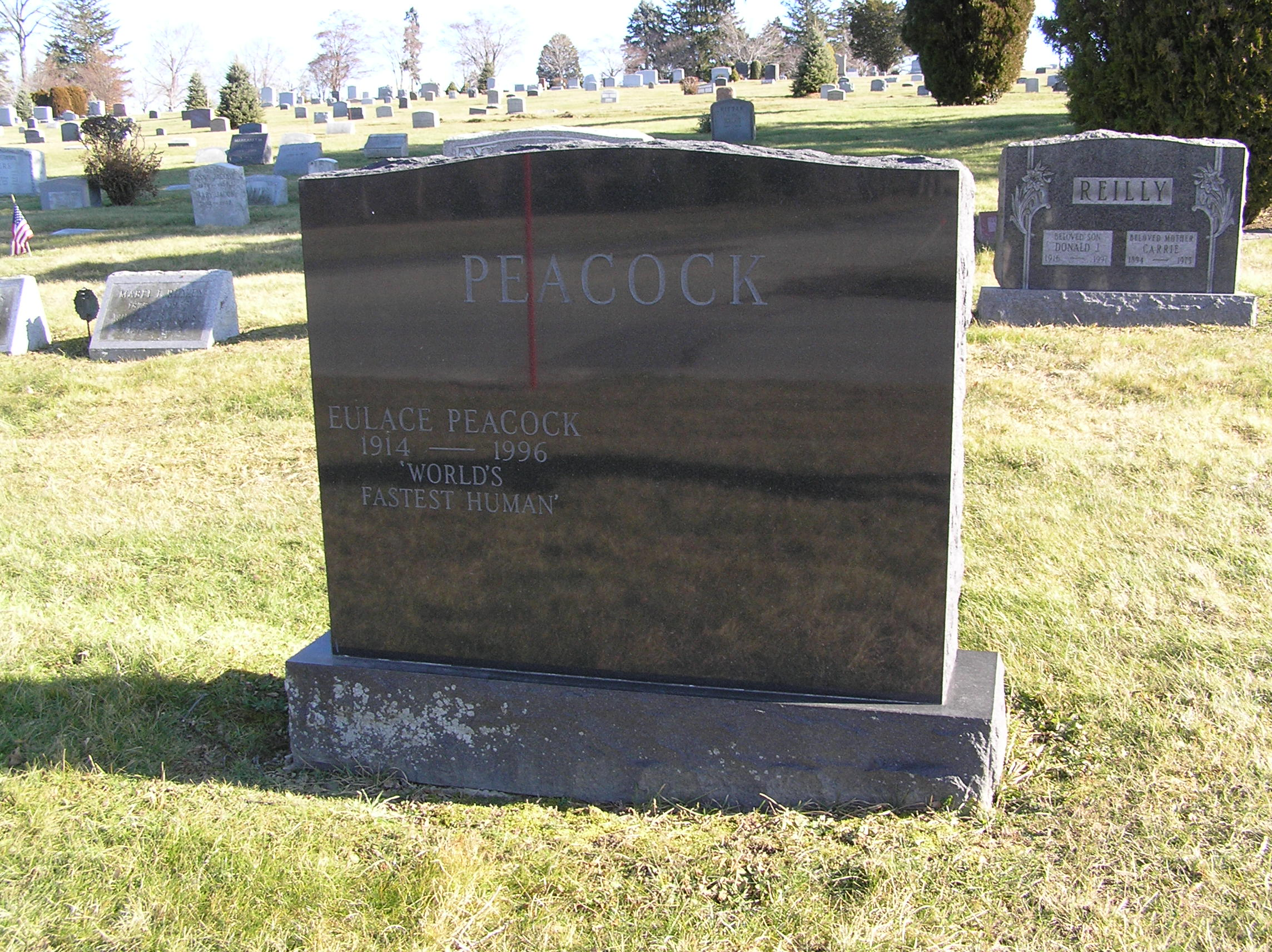
The grave of Eulace Peacock

In 1942, Peacock served in the United States Coast Guard; in later years he opened a liquor store and a car-rental business. He stayed connected with athletics by officiating at championship events and Olympic qualifying trials. He has been honored by a number of athletic bodies, including the National Track and Field Hall of Fame.

== Personal life ==
In 1942, Peacock married Betty in New York City. They have a daughter and son, and seven grandchildren, in Yonkers, New York. His wife died in 1989.

In 1996, Peacock died of Alzheimer's disease at age 82 in Yonkers, New York, and was interred in Kensico Cemetery in Valhalla, NY.
