= Les Steers =

American high jumper

Lester 'Les' Steers
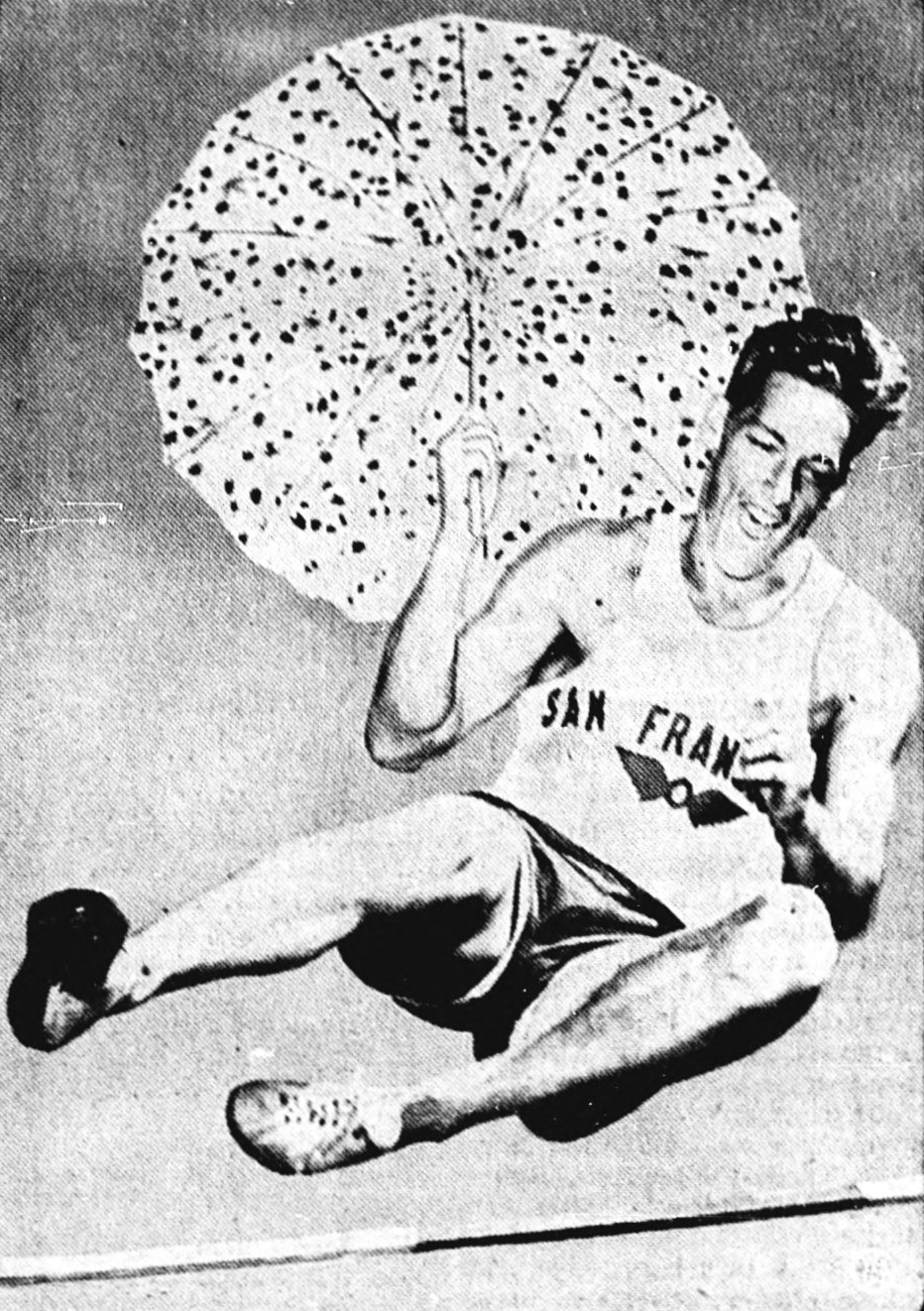
- Steers, circa 1940

Personal details
- Born: June 16, 1917 Rohnerville, California
- Died: January 23, 2003 (aged 85) Richland, Washington

Lester Steers (June 16, 1917 – January 23, 2003) was an American track and field high jumper. In 1941 he broke the world record for the high-jump three times. His last record stood for 12 years.

== Track career ==
Steers attended Palo Alto High School, winning the CIF California State Meet three years in a row from 1935 to 1937 and San Mateo Junior College before attending the University of Oregon in 1941, competing for the 'Ducks' in the year of his greatest triumphs.

Steers competed at the javelin, shot put and high-hurdles for his college athletics team as well as the high jump giving him the aspiration of competing as a decathlete.

It was, however, as a high-jumper that he achieved his greatest success. He was NCAA (United States collegiate) champion (1941)) , 3 times AAU (United States national) champion (1939–41) , and a gold medalist at the World University Games in 1939 (where he also won silver in the javelin and bronze in the pentathlon).

As a jumper, Steers used the 'Belly Roll', a variation of the 'Western Roll'.

== Later life ==
Steers remained in Oregon reportedly working as a salesman.

He died in 2003, a resident of Richland Washington.

== World records ==
Steers achieved the following world records during his athletics career:

- 2.10 m (6 ft 10 3/4 in) in Seattle on 26 April 1941;
- 2.105 m (6 ft 10 7/8 in) in Los Angeles on 24 May 1941;
- 2.11 m (6 ft 11 in) in Los Angeles on 17 June 1941.

Note: only the third was ratified by the sports' governing body, the IAAF.

Steers is also reported to have cleared 7 feet 1/2 inch in an exhibition jump in Eugene on 27 February 1941. The first official clearance of 7 feet was 15 years later by Charles Dumas.

== Accolades and awards ==
In 1974, Steers was inducted into the USA Track and Field Hall of Fame.

In 1992, Steers was inducted into the University of Oregon Hall of Fame.

Records
Preceded by (United States) Mel Walker	Men's High Jump World Record Holder; 1941-06-11 — 1953-06-27	Succeeded by (United States) Walt Davis
