= Eino Pentti =

American long-distance runner

Eino Iisakki Walter Pentti (October 18, 1906 – January 24, 1993) was an American long-distance runner. He represented the United States in the 10,000 meters at the 1932 and 1936 Summer Olympics.

Pentti placed second in the 10,000 meters at the 1932 United States Olympic Trials, qualifying for the 1932 Summer Olympics in Los Angeles; at the Olympics he failed to finish, due to being sick with fever, as did the two other Americans. He captured his first Amateur Athletic Union (AAU) championship title in the 10,000 meters in 1934; he won the championship again in 1937 and 1938. At the 1936 Olympic Trials Pentti placed second a hundred yards behind Don Lash, who set a new American record of 31:06.9. He qualified for the 1936 Summer Olympics in Berlin, where he placed 16th. In 1938 he returned to Berlin for the Germany - USA games and this time won the 10,000 meters race.

Pentti set his personal best for 10,000 meters, 30:54.6, in Helsinki on September 17, 1938; the time broke Lash's American best.

Eino Pentti's life was colorful and filled with sports. He was born in Detroit to Finnish emigrants, and had dual citizenship of both the US and Finland. He was schooled in Finland and that's where his love of long-distance running was cultivated, running for Tampereen Pyrintö sports club. At age 24, he returned to the US to stay. He quickly gained recognition as a long-distance runner. Besides being a well known Olympic Athlete, Eino Pentti was also a military man, and put his cross country skiing skills learned as a child in Finland to good use training U.S. Army recruits to cross country ski. He also became a licensed physiotherapist and worked as a well respected massage therapist in New York, mostly with the New York Athletic Club. His celebrity clientele including such famous actors as Marlon Brando, Burt Lancaster, Frank Sinatra and Al Pacino.
