= Cornelius Johnson (athlete) =

American high jumper (1913–1946)

Medal record

Men's athletics

Representing the United States

Olympic Games
Gold medal – first place	1936 Berlin	High jump

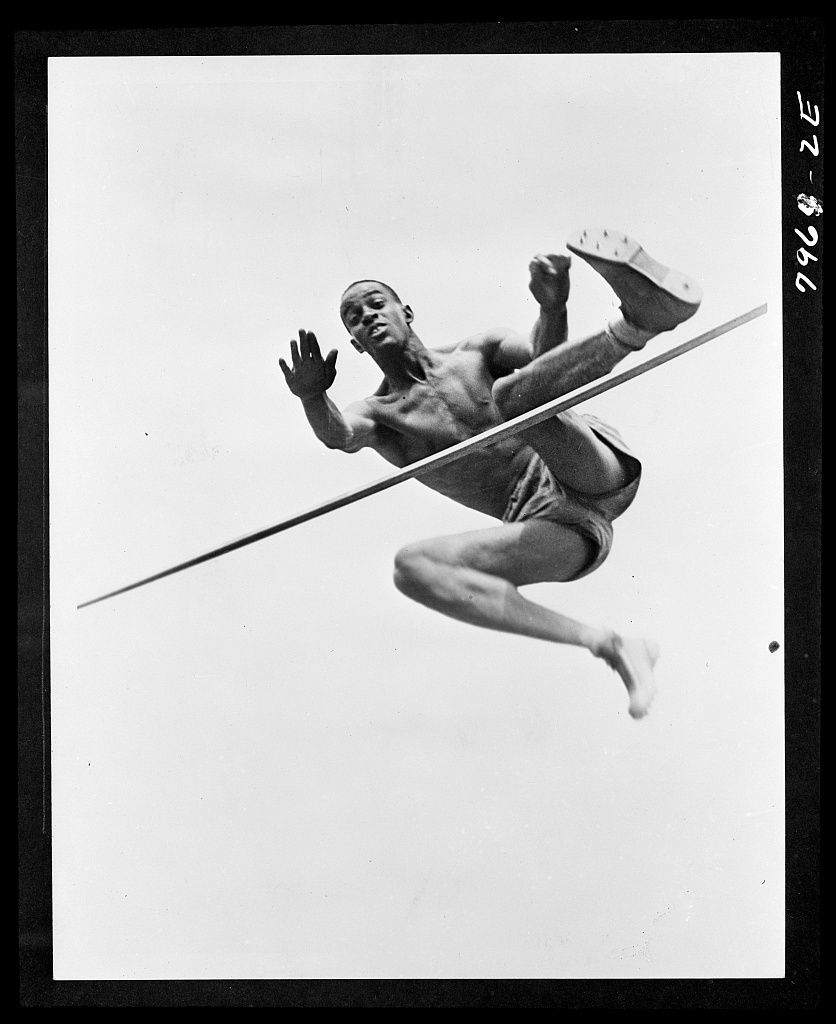
Johnson in 1936

Cornelius Cooper "Corny" Johnson (August 28, 1913 – February 15, 1946) was an American athlete in the high jump. Born in Los Angeles in 1913, Johnson first competed in organized track and field events at Berendo Junior High School. He achieved greater athletic success as a student at Los Angeles High School, competing in the sprint and in the high jump. Before going to the Olympics as a junior, he won the CIF California State Meet in 1932. He had been second the year before.

== Career ==
=== Track and field ===
At the Los Angeles Olympics in 1932, Johnson, who was then an 18-year-old high school student, placed fourth in the high jump under the existing tiebreaker rules. Had the current rules been in force, he would have won the silver medal.

He won the high jump at the State Meet in 1932 and 1933. During 1934-? Johnson attended Compton College and with coach Herschel Smith continued his high jump career.

His technique was described as a panther-like western roll. At the 1936 U.S. Olympic Trials, Johnson set the world record at 6 ft 9 3/4 in (2.07 m). After the bar was remeasured and everybody celebrated, Dave Albritton equalled Johnson's record.

In 1936 Johnson was one of 19 African Americans at the Berlin Olympics, where he won the gold. Johnson's winning height of 2.03m was an Olympic record and he tried unsuccessfully for the world record.

Johnson was the co-holder of the outdoor world record for the high jump for the year 1936-37 and won eight career U.S. titles (five outdoor, three indoor).

== Personal life ==
After retiring from the high jump, he became a letter carrier for the U.S. Post Office in Los Angeles, and in 1945 he joined the U.S. Merchant Marine.

Johnson is a member of Alpha Phi Alpha fraternity.

In 1946, while working as a ship's baker on board the Grace Line's "Santa Cruz," Johnson developed bronchopneumonia. En route from the ship to a California hospital, Corny Johnson died, aged 32.

== Legacy ==
Cornelius Johnson was inducted into the USA Track and Field Hall of Fame in 1994, and the California Community Colleges Track and Field Hall of Fame in 1998.

In 2016, the 1936 Olympic journey of the eighteen black American athletes, including Johnson, was documented in the film Olympic Pride, American Prejudice.

=== Championships ===
1932 Olympics: High Jump (4th)
1936 Olympics: High Jump – 2.03 m (1st)
1932 AAU: High Jump (=1st)
1933 AAU: High Jump (1st)
1934 AAU: High Jump (=1st)
1935 AAU: High Jump (1st)
1936 AAU: High Jump (=1st)

Records
Preceded by (United States) Walter Marty	Men's High Jump World Record Holder along with Dave Albritton; 1936-07-12 – 1937-08-12	Succeeded by (United States) Mel Walker
