= Mel Walker (high jumper) =

American high jumper

Melvin 'Mel' Walker
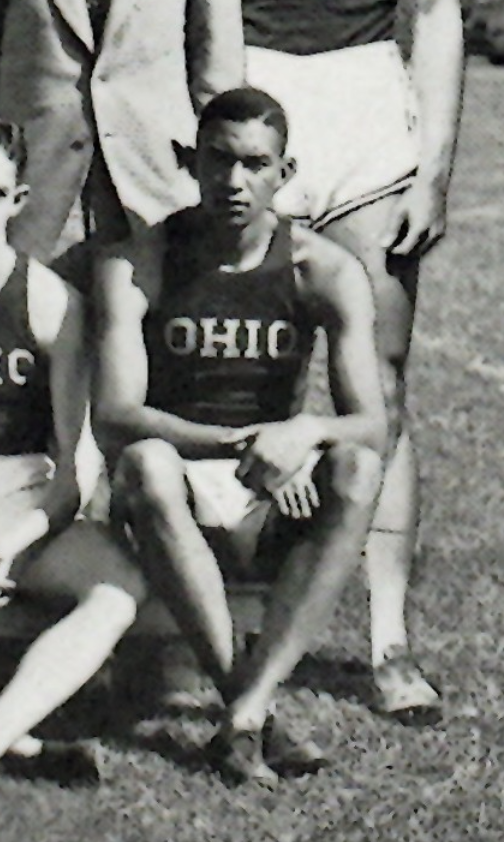

Personal information
- Nationality: American
- Born: April 27, 1914
- Died: November 9, 2000 (aged 86)

Sport
- Sport: Athletics
- Event: High jump
- University team: Ohio State

Achievements and titles
- Personal best: High jump: 2.09 m (6 ft 10 1/4 in) (1937, WR)

Melvin E. Walker (April 27, 1914 – November 9, 2000, in Strongsville, Ohio) was an American track and field athlete specializing in high jump. He was the co-national champion with Dave Albritton in 1938. He finished a non-qualifying fourth place in the 1936 Olympic Trials. That year, while representing Ohio State University, he had tied with his Ohio State teammate Albritton for the NCAA Championship. On August 12, 1937, he set the world record for high jump in Malmö, clearing 2.09 m (6 ft 10 1/4 in). The record would stand until June 17, 1941, when it was beaten by Lester Steers.

Walker benefitted from a rule change that had previously outlawed diving, or clearing the bar first with his head. Walker used a variation of the Western roll.

Records
| Preceded by (United States) Cornelius Johnson tied with Dave Albritton | Men's High Jump World Record Holder; 1937-08-12 - 1941-06-17 | Succeeded by (United States) Lester Steers |
