= Dave Albritton =

American high jumper

David Albritton
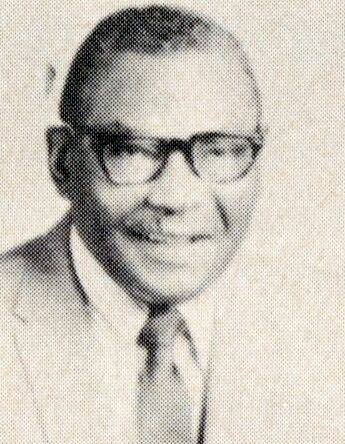

Member of the Ohio House of Representatives from the 34th district
- In office January 3, 1961 – December 31, 1972
- Preceded by: Frederick Bowers
- Succeeded by: Ed Orlett

Personal details
- Born: April 13, 1913 Danville, Alabama, U.S.
- Died: May 14, 1994 (aged 81) Dayton, Ohio, U.S.
- Party: Republican

Medal record

Men's athletics

Representing United States

Olympic Games
Silver medal – second place	1936 Berlin	High jump

David Donald Albritton (April 13, 1913 – May 14, 1994) was an American athlete, teacher, coach, and state legislator. He had a long athletic career that spanned three decades and numerous titles and was one of the first high jumpers to use the straddle technique. He was born in Danville, Alabama.

== Athletic career ==
As a sophomore at Ohio State University, Albritton won the National Collegiate Athletic Association championship in 1936.

In 1936, Albritton and Cornelius Johnson both cleared 6 ft 9 3/4 in (2.07 m) to set a world record at the Olympic Trials, becoming the first people of African descent to hold the world record in the event. Albritton was second to Johnson at the 1936 Summer Olympics, with a height of 6 ft 6 3/4 in (2.00 m). He claimed the silver medal in a jump-off after he and two other jumpers cleared the same height.

Albritton and Johnson were snubbed by Hitler when they went to collect their medals. In 2016, the 1936 Olympic journey of the eighteen Black American athletes, including Albritton and Jesse Owens was documented in the film Olympic Pride, American Prejudice.

Albritton won or tied for seven National Amateur Athletic Union outdoor titles from 1936 to 1950. He was AAU outdoor champion in 1937, 1946, and 1947 and tied for three national collegiate titles, in 1938, 1945, and 1950.

=== Coaching and political career ===
Albritton later became a high school teacher and coach. He served in the Ohio House of Representatives for six terms. In 1980, he was inducted into the USA Track and Field Hall of Fame.

== Legacy ==
A historic marker honoring Albritton was unveiled on July 12, 2013, in Danville, Alabama.

Records
Preceded by (United States) Walter Marty	Men's High Jump World Record Holder along with Cornelius Johnson; 1936-07-12 – 1937-08-12	Succeeded by (United States) Mel Walker
