= Lula Hymes Glenn =

American track and field athlete

- Lula Hymes Glenn in 2008

Personal information
- Nationality: American
- Born: Lula Hymes; 1917 Atlanta, Georgia
- Died: 2016 (aged 98–99) Auburn, Georgia
- Education: Tuskegee Institute
- Occupations: Athlete, Teacher
- Spouse: Miles Glenn

Sport
- Sport: Track and Field
- University team: Tuskegee Institute

Lula Hymes Glenn (1917-2016) was an American track and field athlete who tied the world record time for the 100-meter dash at 11.5 seconds in 1939. She was considered one of the fastest women in the world at the height of her athletic career.

== Biography ==
Glenn née Hymes was born in Atlanta, Georgia in 1917. She attended Booker T. Washington High School. She then attended the Tuskegee Institute on a track scholarship.

In 1937 Glenn earned three gold medals in national competitions. In 1939 she tied the world record time for the 100-meter dash at 11.5 seconds. In 1940 she was called "America’s greatest girl track and field athlete" by the Atlanta Constitution. Glenn was the contemporary of two other notable Tuskegee women athletes, Leila Perry Glover and Alice Coachman Davis.

Because of her outstanding collegiate career Glenn was favored to win a gold medal at the Olympics in 1940. However the 1940 games were cancelled due to the outbreak of World War II. The 1944 games were cancelled as well and Glenn chose not to compete in the 1948 games.

Glenn became a teacher after she graduated from the Tuskegee Institute. She taught Home Economics and Physical Education. In 1974 she became a member of the Tuskegee University Athletic Hall of Fame.

Glenn died in Auburn, Georgia in 2016. Glenn is included in "Black Women in America: An Historical Encyclopedia".
