= Athletics at the 1936 Summer Olympics – Men's discus throw =

Men's discus throw at the Games of the XI Olympiad
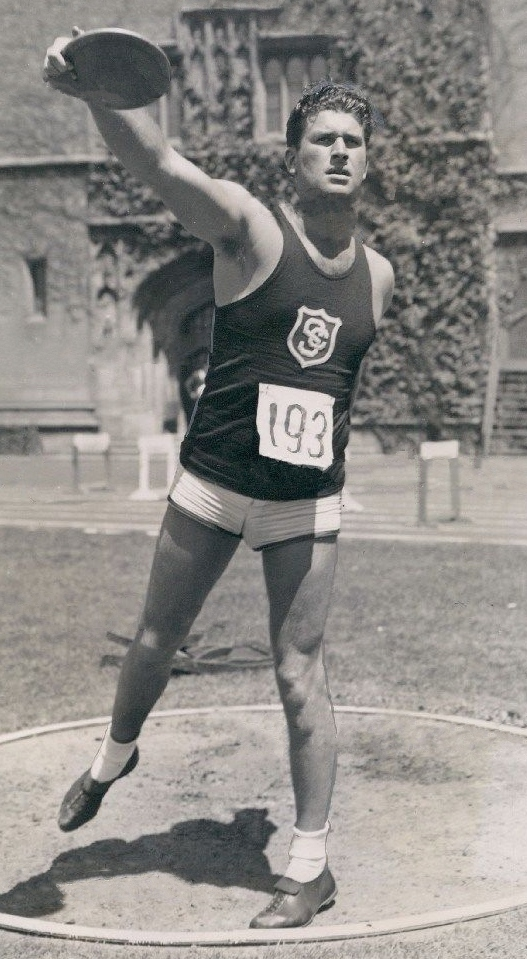
- Ken Carpenter
- Venue: Olympiastadion: Berlin, Germany
- Date: August 5, 1936
- Competitors: 31 from 17 nations
- Winning distance: 50.48 OR

Medalists
1st place, gold medalist(s)		Ken Carpenter; United States
2nd place, silver medalist(s)		Gordon Dunn; United States
3rd place, bronze medalist(s)		Giorgio Oberweger; Italy

The men's discus throw event was part of the track and field athletics programme at the 1936 Summer Olympics. The competition was held on August 5, 1936. Thirty-one athletes from 17 nations competed. The maximum number of athletes per nation had been set at 3 since the 1930 Olympic Congress. The final was won by Ken Carpenter of the United States. It was the nation's fourth consecutive, and seventh overall, victory in the men's discus throw; it was also the second consecutive Games that the Americans finished with both of the top two places, as Gordon Dunn took silver. Giorgio Oberweger earned Italy's first men's discus throw medal with his bronze.

== Background ==
This was the 10th appearance of the event, which is one of 12 athletics events to have been held at every Summer Olympics. The returning finalists from 1932 were bronze medalist Paul Winter and fourth-place finisher Jules Noël of France and sixth-place finisher Endre Madarász of Hungary. The favorites were Harald Andersson of Sweden ("dominant" in 1934 and 1935, with two world records in one day in 1934) and Willy Schröder of Germany (who had broken Andersson's record in 1935).

The Republic of China and Liechtenstein each made their debut in the men's discus throw. The United States made its 10th appearance, having competed in every edition of the Olympic men's discus throw to date.

== Competition format ==
The competition introduced a true two-round format, with the qualifying round completely separate from the divided final (though the official report describes the competition as having three phases, with the final being a "semi-finals" and "final"). In qualifying, each athlete received three attempts; those recording a mark of at least 44.00 metres advanced to the final. The results of the qualifying round were then ignored. Finalists received three throws each, with the top six competitors receiving an additional three attempts. The best distance among those six throws counted.

== Records ==
These were the standing world and Olympic records (in metres) prior to the 1932 Summer Olympics.

World record	Willy Schröder (GER)	53.10	Magdeburg, Germany	28 April 1935
Olympic record	John Anderson (USA)	49.49	Los Angeles, United States	3 August 1932

Ken Carpenter broke the Olympic record by throwing 50.48 metres in the fourth throw of the final.

== Schedule ==
Date	Time	Round
Wednesday, 5 August 1936	10:30; 15:00	Qualifying; Final

== Results ==
=== Qualifying ===
Distances are estimated.

Rank	Athlete	Nation	Distance	Notes
1	Gordon Dunn	United States	47.00	Q
1	Reidar Sørlie	Norway	47.00	Q
1	Walter Wood	United States	47.00	Q
4	Giorgio Oberweger	Italy	46.00	Q
5	Jules Noël	France	45.50	Q
6	Gunnar Bergh	Sweden	45.00	Q
6	Ken Carpenter	United States	45.00	Q
6	Helge Sivertsen	Norway	45.00	Q
6	Nikolaos Syllas	Greece	45.00	Q
6	Johann Wotapek	Austria	45.00	Q
11	Hans Fritsch	Germany	44.50	Q
12	Åke Hedvall	Sweden	44.00	Q
12	Willy Schröder	Germany	44.00	Q
13–31	Bernarr Prendergast	Great Britain	Unknown	
13–31	Guo Jie	Republic of China	41.13	
13–31	Emil Janausch	Austria	Unknown	
13–31	Endre Madarász	Hungary	Unknown	
13–31	Gerhard Hilbrecht	Germany	Unknown	
13–31	Harald Andersson	Sweden	38.50	
13–31	Jean Wagner	Luxembourg	Unknown	
13–31	Kalevi Kotkas	Finland	Unknown	
13–31	Laurence Reavell-Carter	Great Britain	Unknown	
13–31	Ling Peigeng	Republic of China	Unknown	
13–31	Miroslav Vítek	Czechoslovakia	Unknown	
13–31	Nikola Kleut	Yugoslavia	Unknown	
13–31	Oskar Ospelt	Liechtenstein	Unknown	
13–31	Paul Winter	France	Unknown	
13–31	Petre Havaleț	Romania	Unknown	
13–31	Ruggero Biancani	Italy	Unknown	
13–31	Valér Barač	Czechoslovakia	42.82	
13–31	Veljko Narančić	Yugoslavia	Unknown	

=== Final ===
Rank	Athlete	Nation	1	2	3	4	5	6	Distance	Notes
1st place, gold medalist(s)	Ken Carpenter	United States	X	44.53	48.98	X	50.48	47.48	50.48 OR	OR
2nd place, silver medalist(s)	Gordon Dunn	United States	X	49.36	48.04	47.21	47.77	X	49.36	
3rd place, bronze medalist(s)	Giorgio Oberweger	Italy	46.67	46.65	49.23	47.28	X	X	49.23	
4	Reidar Sørlie	Norway	47.01	48.77	46.79	47.66	48.65	47.87	48.77	
5	Willy Schröder	Germany	44.79	47.22	45.01	47.39	47.81	47.93	47.93	
6	Nikolaos Syllas	Greece	47.75	44.58	47.07	45.34	47.59	47.67	47.75	
7	Gunnar Bergh	Sweden	44.19	47.13	47.22	Did not advance			47.22	
8	Åke Hedvall	Sweden	46.20	46.15	45.83	Did not advance			46.20	
9	Johann Wotapek	Austria	45.65	44.34	46.05	Did not advance			46.05	
10	Helge Sivertsen	Norway	X	45.82	45.89	Did not advance			45.89	
11	Hans Fritsch	Germany	38.91	45.10	43.61	Did not advance			45.10	
12	Jules Noël	France	44.56	X	43.70	Did not advance			44.56	
13	Walter Wood	United States	43.83	X	43.32	Did not advance			43.83	
