= 1934 European Athletics Championships – Men's discus throw =

Men's discus throw at the European Athletics Championships

The men's discus throw at the 1934 European Athletics Championships was held in Turin, Italy, at the Stadio Benito Mussolini on 8 September 1934.

== Medalists ==
Gold	Harald Andersson; Sweden
Silver	Paul Winter; France
Bronze	István Donogán; Hungary

== Results ==
=== Final ===
8 September

Rank	Name	Nationality	Result	Notes
1st place, gold medalist(s)	Harald Andersson	Sweden	50.38	CR
2nd place, silver medalist(s)	Paul Winter	France	47.09	
3rd place, bronze medalist(s)	István Donogán	Hungary	45.91	
4	József Remetz	Hungary	45.54	
5	Arnold Viiding	Estonia	45.51	
6	Giorgio Oberweger	Italy	45.38	
7	Jules Noël	France	45.02	
8	Emil Janausch	Austria	45.01	
9	Anton Karlsson	Sweden	43.89	
10	Kalevi Kotkas	Finland	42.50	
11	Nikolaos Syllas	Greece	41.53	
–	Jaroslav Knotek	Czechoslovakia	NM	

=== Qualification ===
8 September

Rank	Name	Nationality	Result	Notes
	Zygmunt Heljasz	Poland	42.50	
	Kamen Ganchev	Bulgaria	40.28	
	Benvenuto Mignani	Italy		
	Petre Havalet	Romania		
	Aad de Bruyn	Netherlands		
	Jānis Dimza	Latvia		
	Vilis Rozenbergs	Latvia		

== Participation ==
According to an unofficial count, 18 athletes from 13 countries participated in the event.

- Austria (1)
- Bulgaria (1)
- Estonia (1)
- Finland (1)
- France (2)
- Greece (1)
- Hungary (2)
- Italy (2)
- Latvia (2)
- Netherlands (1)
- Poland (1)
- Romania (1)
- Sweden (2)
