= 1938 European Athletics Championships – Men's discus throw =

Men's discus throw at the European Athletics Championships

The men's discus throw at the 1938 European Athletics Championships was held in Paris, France, at Stade Olympique de Colombes on 5 September 1938.

== Medalists ==
Gold	Willy Schröder; Germany
Silver	Giorgio Oberweger; Italy
Bronze	Gunnar Bergh; Sweden

== Results ==
=== Final ===
5 September

Rank	Name	Nationality	Result	Notes
1st place, gold medalist(s)	Willy Schröder	Germany	49.70	
2nd place, silver medalist(s)	Giorgio Oberweger	Italy	49.48	
3rd place, bronze medalist(s)	Gunnar Bergh	Sweden	48.72	
4	Kalevi Kotkas	Finland	48.63	
5	Adolfo Consolini	Italy	48.02	
6	Jenő Kulitzy	Hungary	47.19	
7	Jules Noël	France	46.65	
8	Reidar Sørlie	Norway	46.36	
9	Åke Hedvall	Sweden	46.08	
10	Stylianos Floros	Greece	45.56	
11	Nikolaos Syllas	Greece	45.50	
12	Ernst Lampert	Germany	44.38	
13	Paul Winter	France	42.68	
14	Jaroslav Vítek	Czechoslovakia	41.18	
15	Oskar Ospelt	Liechtenstein	39.80	
16	Jean Wagner	Luxembourg	38.17	

== Participation ==
According to an unofficial count, 16 athletes from 11 countries participated in the event.

- Czechoslovakia (1)
- Finland (1)
- France (2)
- Germany (2)
- Greece (2)
- Hungary (1)
- Italy (2)
- Liechtenstein (1)
- Luxembourg (1)
- Norway (1)
- Sweden (2)
