= 1930 USA Outdoor Track and Field Championships =

American athletics championship event

- Dates: 22–25 August (men); 4 July (women)
- Host city: Pittsburgh, Pennsylvania (men); Dallas, Texas (women)
- Venue: Pitt Stadium (men); Ownby Stadium (women)
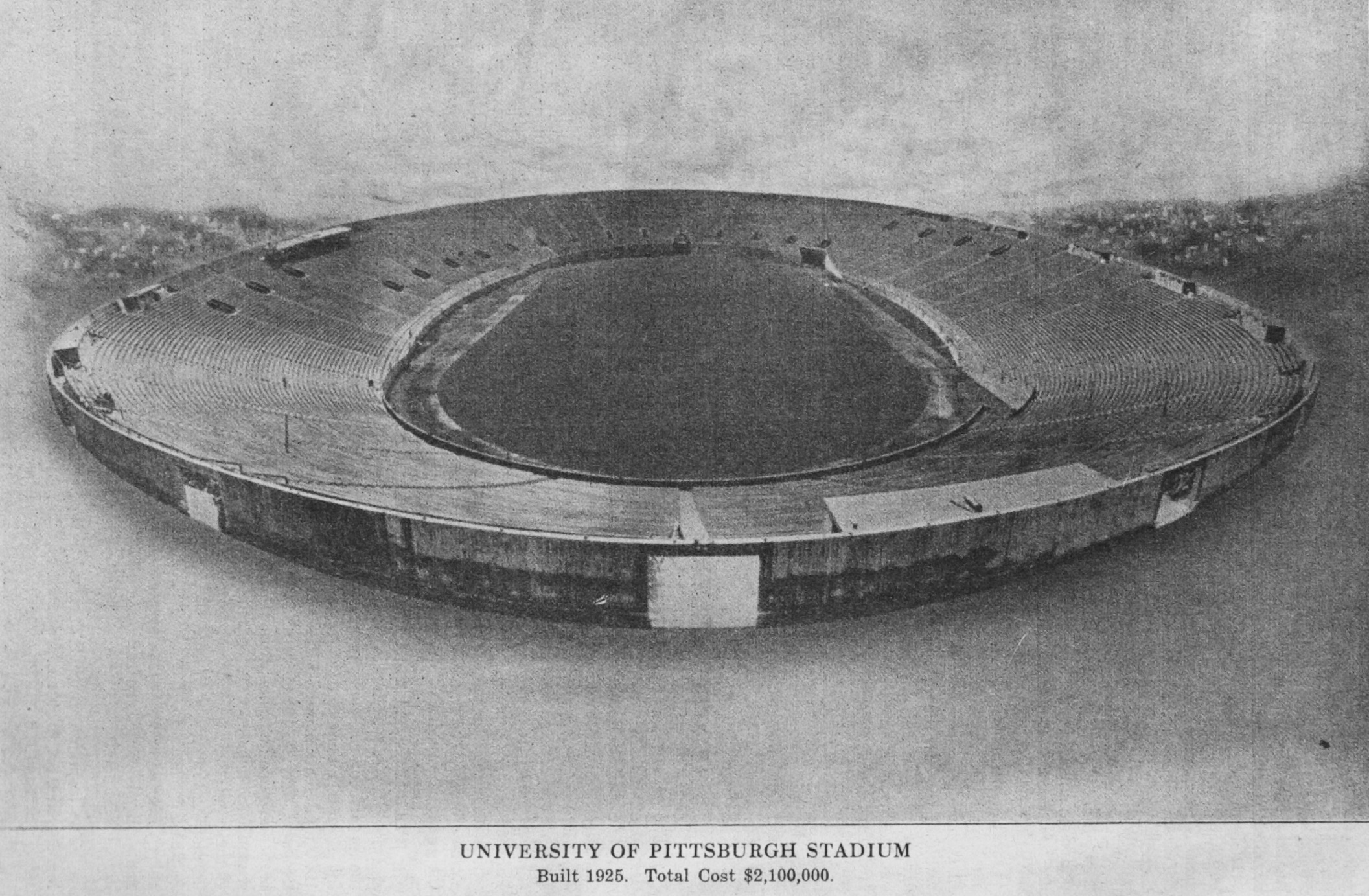

The 1930 USA Outdoor Track and Field Championships were organized by the Amateur Athletic Union (AAU) and served as the national championships in outdoor track and field for the United States.

The men's edition was held at Pitt Stadium in Pittsburgh, Pennsylvania, and it took place 22–25 August. The women's meet was held separately at Ownby Stadium in Dallas, Texas, on 4 July.

At the men's championships, the discus world record was set by Paul Jessup. The women's competition was marked by the debut of Stella Walsh, who would go on to win 34 individual titles from 1930 to 1951.

== Results ==
=== Men ===
Event	Gold		Silver		Bronze	
100 yards	Eddie Tolan	9.7	George Simpson	inches behind	Russell Sweet	1 yd behind 2nd
220 yards	George Simpson	21.3	Eddie Tolan		Cyrus Leland	
440 yards	Victor Williams	48.8	John Lewis	48.9 e	Nate Long	
880 yards	Edwin Genung	1:53.4	Rupert Beetham	1:54.0 e	Levi Myers	
1 mile	Ray Conger	4:19.8	Paul Rekers		Rufus Kiser	
10,000 m	Lou Gregory	31:31.3	Clark Chamberlain		Thomas McDonough	
Marathon	Yrjö Korholin-Koski (FIN)	2:25:21.2	Jack O'Reilly (CAN)	2:33:08.0	Jack Lamb	2:33:20.0
120 yards hurdles	Steve Anderson	14.4	Charles Kaster		James Hatfield	
440 yards hurdles	Richard Pomeroy	53.1	Clyde Blanchard		Arthur Holman	
2 miles steeplechase	Joseph McCluskey	10:44.2	Harry Werbin		John Zola	
High jump	Anton Burg	1.95 m	Henry LaSallette	1.95 m	Henry Coggeshall	1.88 m
Pole vault	Fred Sturdy	4.11 m	Thomas Warne	4.11 m	Lowell Allen	4.06 m
Long jump	Al Bates	7.41 m	George Martin	7.31 m	Solomon Furth	7.29 m
Triple jump	Levi Casey	14.62 m	Robert Patton	14.35 m	Solomon Furth	14.34 m
Shot put	Herman Brix	15.99 m	Harlow Rothert	15.32 m	Paul Jessup	15.05 m
Discus throw	Paul Jessup	51.72 m	Harlow Rothert	44.10 m	Frank Purma	43.85 m
Hammer throw	Norwood Wright	49.92 m	Edmund Black	49.53 m	Edward Flanagan	46.84 m
Javelin throw	James DeMers	67.84 m	Lee Bartlett	60.08 m	Lee Weldon	59.92 m
Decathlon	Wilson Charles	7313.343 pts	James Stewart	7119.605 pts	Joseph Hall	7075.071 pts
220 yards hurdles	Robert Maxwell	24.1				
Pentathlon	Barney Berlinger	3462 pts				
Weight throw for distance	Leo Sexton	10.52 m				

=== Women ===
Event	Gold		Silver	Bronze
50 yards	Mary Carew	6.2	Olive Hasenfus	Annette Rogers
100 yards	Stanislawa Walasiewicz	11.2	Betty Robinson	Olive Hasenfus
200 m	Stanislawa Walasiewicz	25.4	Florence Wright	Mary Carew
80 m hurdles	Evelyne Hall	13.0	Ruth Boswell	Anna Koll
High jump	Jean Shiley	1.55 m	Genevieve Valvoda	Annette Rogers
Long jump	Stanislawa Walasiewicz	5.73 m	Mildred Didrikson	Eleanor Egg
Shot put	Rena McDonald	11.87 m	Evelyn Ferrara	Eleanor Egg
Discus throw	Evelyn Ferrara	33.98 m	Rena McDonald	Lucy Stratton
Javelin throw	Mildred Didrikson	40.61 m	Katherine Mearls	Lucy Stratton
Baseball throw	Babe Didrikson	268 ft 10 1/2 in (81.95 m)		

== See also ==
- 1930 USA Indoor Track and Field Championships
- List of USA Outdoor Track and Field Championships winners (men)
- List of USA Outdoor Track and Field Championships winners (women)
