= 1929 USA Outdoor Track and Field Championships =

American athletics championship event

- Dates: 3–5 July (men); 27 July (women)
- Host city: Denver, Colorado (men); Chicago, Illinois (women)
- Venue: DU Stadium (men); Soldier Field (women)
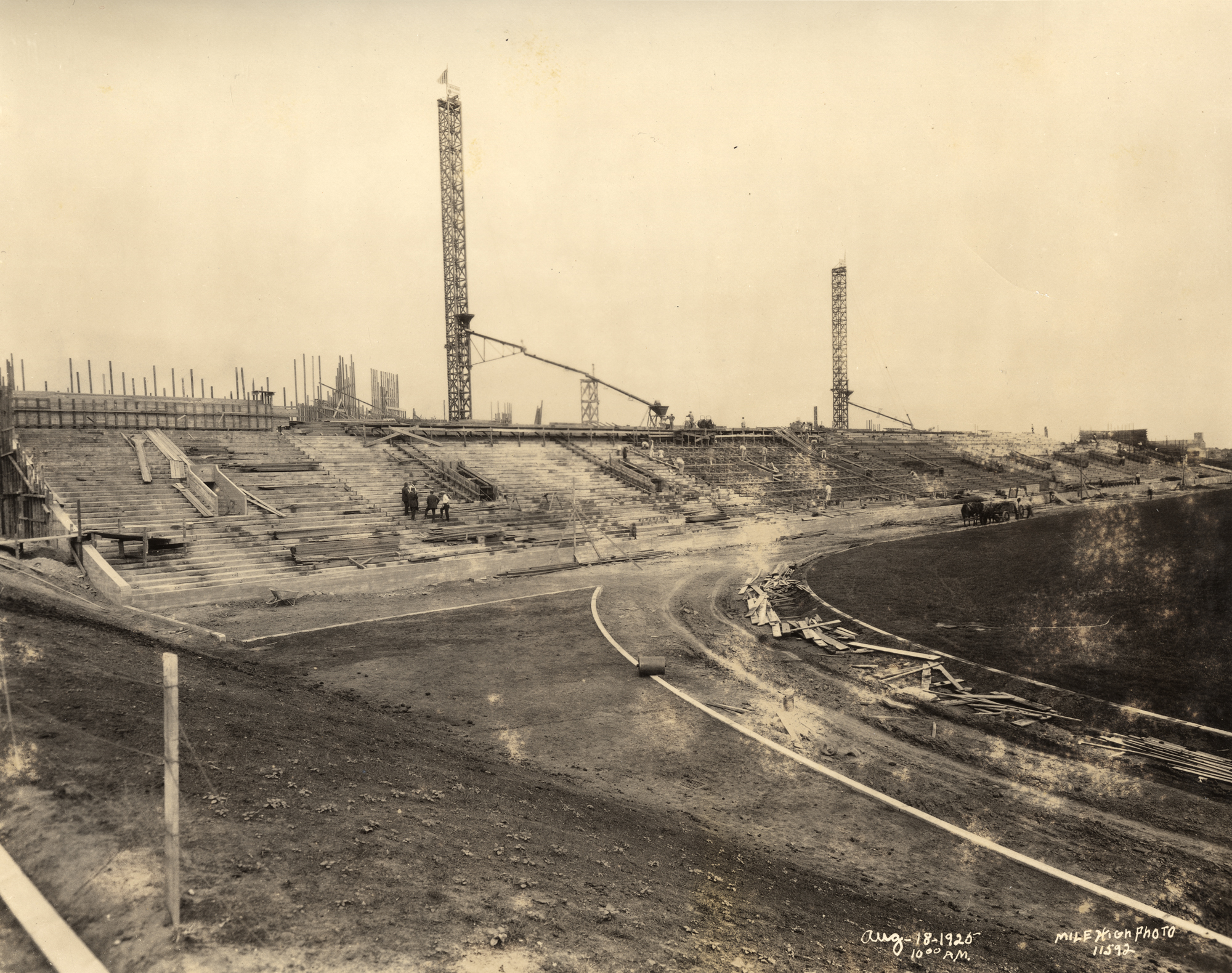

The 1929 USA Outdoor Track and Field Championships were organized by the Amateur Athletic Union (AAU) and served as the national championships in outdoor track and field for the United States.

The men's edition was held at DU Stadium in Denver, Colorado, and it took place 3–5 July. The women's meet was held separately at Soldier Field in Chicago, Illinois, on 27 July.

At the men's championships, significant winds caused slow times in running events. In the women's competition, the 800 m event was removed due to International Olympic Committee backlash following its inclusion at the 1928 Olympics.

== Results ==
=== Men ===
Event	Gold		Silver		Bronze	
100 yards	Eddie Tolan	10.0	Claude Bracey	inches behind	Russell Sweet	1 ft behind 2nd
220 yards	Eddie Tolan	21.9	Frank Wykoff	5 yards behind	Cyrus Leland	
440 yards	Reginald Bowen	48.4	William Storie	10 yards behind	Edgar Blake	2 yards behind 2nd
880 yards	Philip Edwards (CAN)	1:55.7	Edwin Genung	5 yards behind	Samuel Martin	20 yards behind 2nd
1 mile	Leo Lermond	4:24.6	Rufus Kiser	2 yards behind	Harold Manning	15 yards behind 2nd
10,000 m	Lou Gregory	33:47.7	Harry Chauca		George Harbeck	
Marathon	John Miles (CAN)	2:33:08.8	Yrjö Korholin-Koski (FIN)	2:35:25.0	Ville Kyrönen (FIN)	2:35:44.0
120 yards hurdles	Steve Anderson	14.9	Charles Kaster		Jed Welsh	
440 yards hurdles	Gordon Allott	54.3	F. Morgan Taylor	yards behind	Clyde Blanchard	yards behind 2nd
2 miles steeplechase	David Abbott	10:59.1	Edward Parker		Harry Chauca	
High jump	Henry LaSallette	1.92* m	Henry Coggeshall	1.92* m	Jack McIntosh	1.92* m
Pole vault	Fred Sturdy	4.20 m	Tom Warne	4.09 m	Victor Pickard (CAN)	4.05 m
Long jump	Ed Gordon	7.42 m	George Martin	7.38 m	Wilson Charles	7.19 m
Triple jump	Robert Kelley	14.80 m	Solomon Furth	14.67 m	Robert Patton	14.57 m
Shot put	Herman Brix	15.30 m	Eric Krenz	15.14 m	Harlow Rothert	14.54 m
Discus throw	Eric Krenz	47.90 m	Ed Moeller	46.49 m	Paul Jessup	44.19 m
Hammer throw	Jack Merchant	51.97 m	Norwood Wright	50.72 m	Edmund Black	50.49 m
Javelin throw	Jesse Mortensen	62.43 m	Lee Bartlett	61.58 m	Emory Curtice	59.18 m
Decathlon	Kenneth Doherty	7784.68 pts	Vernon Kennedy	7275.453 pts	Wilson Charles	7240.035 pts
220 yards hurdles	Stephen Anderson	24.1				
Pentathlon	Paul Courtois	2900 pts				
Weight throw for distance	Pat McDonald	10.89 m				

=== Women ===
Event	Gold		Silver	Bronze
50 yards	Betty Robinson	5.8	Loretta McNeil	Delores Henders
100 yards	Betty Robinson	11.2	Jessie Cross	Ethel Harrington
200 m	Maybelle Gilliland	27.4	Ruth Waldner	Florence McDonald
80 m hurdles	Helen Filkey	12.6	Evelyne Hall	Nellie Todd
High jump	Jean Shiley	1.47 m	Genevieve Valvoda	Eleanor Egg
Long jump	Nellie Todd	5.28 m	Margaret Whitcomb	Eleanor Towler
Shot put (8 lb)	Rena McDonald	12.88 m	Eleanor Egg	Evelyn Ferrara
Discus throw	Rena McDonald	34.54 m	Dee Boeckman	Evelyn Ferrara
Javelin throw	Estelle Hill	30.61 m	Fay Langford	Rena McDonald
Baseball throw	Gloria Russell	258 ft 1 in (78.66 m)		

== See also ==
- 1929 USA Indoor Track and Field Championships
- List of USA Outdoor Track and Field Championships winners (men)
- List of USA Outdoor Track and Field Championships winners (women)
