= 1938 European Athletics Championships – Men's shot put =

Men's shot put at the European Athletics Championships

The men's shot put at the 1938 European Athletics Championships was held in Paris, France, at Stade Olympique de Colombes on 4 September 1938.

== Medalists ==
Gold	Aleksander Kreek; Estonia
Silver	Gerhard Stöck; Germany
Bronze	Hans Woellke; Germany

== Results ==
=== Final ===
4 September

Rank	Name	Nationality	Result	Notes
1st place, gold medalist(s)	Aleksander Kreek	Estonia	15.83	CR
2nd place, silver medalist(s)	Gerhard Stöck	Germany	15.59	
3rd place, bronze medalist(s)	Hans Woellke	Germany	15.52	
4	Sulo Bärlund	Finland	15.07	
5	Gunnar Bergh	Sweden	14.92	
6	Jaroslav Vítek	Czechoslovakia	14.77	
7	Angiolo Profeti	Italy	14.67	
8	Witold Gerutto	Poland	14.41	
9	Jules Noël	France	14.35	
10	Roger Braconnot	France	14.12	
11	Kalevi Kotkas	Finland	13.92	
12	Jean Wagner	Luxembourg	13.35	

== Participation ==
According to an unofficial count, 12 athletes from 9 countries participated in the event.

- Czechoslovakia (1)
- Estonia (1)
- Finland (2)
- France (2)
- Germany (2)
- Italy (1)
- Luxembourg (1)
- Poland (1)
- Sweden (1)
