= József Remecz =

Hungarian discus thrower

József Remecz (30 March 1907 – 17 May 1989) was a Hungarian discus thrower. Remecz broke the European record in men's discus throw several times and was the first European to break 50 metres. He was one of the favorites at the 1932 Summer Olympics, but only placed ninth.

== Career ==
Hungary became Europe's leading discus throw power during the early 1930s, with the emergence of throwers like Remecz, István Donogán and Endre Madarász. Remecz first broke the European record in 1931, throwing 48.83 m in Debrecen; his mark was the best in the world that year. Remecz broke the European record three more times in 1932, eventually reaching 50.73 m in Dunakeszi; he was the first European to break 50 metres. He was one of the leading favorites at the 1932 Summer Olympics in Los Angeles, but he underperformed and only reached 45.02 m, placing ninth and failing to qualify for the final rounds.

Remecz's European record was broken by Sweden's Harald "Slaktarn" Andersson in 1934. Remecz was Hungarian champion in 1932, 1933 and 1934 and placed fourth at the inaugural European Championships in Turin, behind Andersson, Paul Winter and Donogán. Although Remecz never improved his personal best again, he remained in good shape for a long time, ranking in the world's top 25 thirteen times between 1931 and 1944.

Records
| Preceded by (Germany) Hans Hoffmeister | European record holder in men's discus throw June 21, 1931 – June 5, 1932 | Succeeded by (France) Jules Noël |
| Preceded by (France) Jules Noël | European record holder in men's discus throw June 9, 1932 – August 25, 1934 | Succeeded by (Sweden) Harald Andersson |
