= Athletics at the 1936 Summer Olympics – Men's shot put =

Men's shot put at the Games of the XI Olympiad
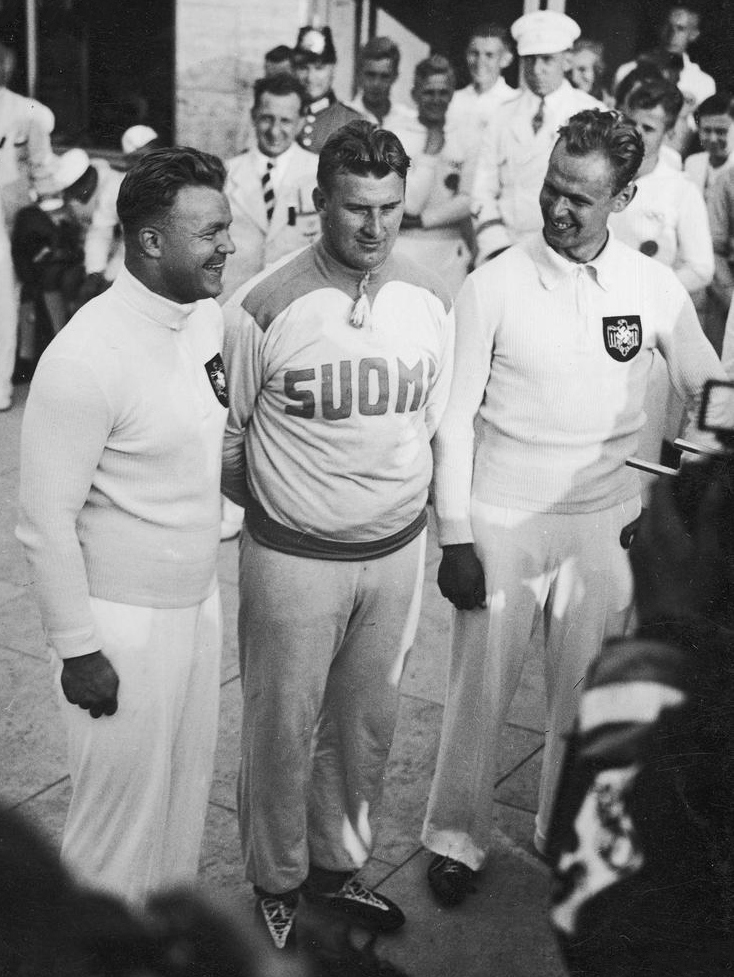
- Left-right: Woellke, Bärlund and Stöck
- Venue: Olympiastadion: Berlin, Germany
- Dates: 2 August 1936
- Competitors: 22 from 14 nations
- Winning distance: 16.20

Medalists
1st place, gold medalist(s)		Hans Woellke; Germany
2nd place, silver medalist(s)		Sulo Bärlund; Finland
3rd place, bronze medalist(s)		Gerhard Stöck; Germany

The men's shot put event was part of the track and field athletics programme at the 1936 Summer Olympics. The competition was held on 2 August 1936. Twenty-two athletes from 14 nations competed. The maximum number of athletes per nation had been set at 3 since the 1930 Olympic Congress. The final was won by Hans Woellke of Germany. It was Germany's first victory in the men's shot put, and first medal since bronze in 1928. Germany also received bronze in 1936, with Gerhard Stöck finishing third. Between the two Germans was Sulo Bärlund of Finland with silver, the nation's first medal in the event since gold in 1920. For the first time, the United States won no medals in the men's shot put, with the three Americans finishing 4th, 5th, and 6th.

== Background ==
This was the 10th appearance of the event, which is one of 12 athletics events to have been held at every Summer Olympics. Returning shot putters from the 1932 Games were bronze medalist František Douda of Czechoslovakia, sixth-place finisher Hans-Heinrich Sievert of Germany, eighth-place finisher József Darányi of Hungary, tenth-place finisher Jules Noël of France, and fifteenth-place finisher Antônio Lira of Brazil. Douda had held the world record from late 1932 to early 1934, but Jack Torrance of the United States had set a record in 1934 that would last until 1948. Torrance was favored in Berlin, slightly ahead of Hans Woellke of host Germany.

Afghanistan, the Republic of China, and Japan each made their debut in the men's shot put. The United States appeared for the 10th time, the only nation to have competed in all Olympic shot put competitions to date.

== Competition format ==
The competition introduced a true two-round format, with the qualifying round completely separate from the divided final (though the official report describes the competition as having three phases, with the final being a "semi-finals" and "final"). In qualifying, each athlete received three attempts; those recording a mark of at least 14.50 metres advanced to the final. The results of the qualifying round were then ignored. Finalists received three throws each, with the top six competitors receiving an additional three attempts. The best distance among those six throws counted.

== Records ==
These were the standing world and Olympic records (in metres) prior to the 1936 Summer Olympics.

World record	Jack Torrance (USA)	17.40	Oslo, Norway	5 August 1934
Olympic record	Leo Sexton (USA)	15.87	Los Angeles, United States	31 July 1932

Sulo Bärlund broke the Olympic record with a throw of 16.03 metres in the second throw of the final. This record lasted until the fifth throw, when Bärlund throw 16.12 and Hans Woellke threw 16.20 metres.

== Schedule ==
Date	Time	Round
Sunday, 2 August 1936	11:00; 17:30	Qualifying; Final

== Results ==
=== Qualifying ===
Rank	Athlete	Nation	Distance	Notes
1—15	Hans Woellke	Germany	>=14.50	Q
1—15	Sulo Bärlund	Finland	>=14.50	Q
1—15	Gerhard Stöck	Germany	>=14.50	Q
1—15	Sam Francis	United States	>=14.50	Q
1—15	Jack Torrance	United States	>=14.50	Q
1—15	Dimitri Zaitz	United States	>=14.50	Q
1—15	František Douda	Czechoslovakia	>=14.50	Q
1—15	Arnold Viiding	Estonia	>=14.50	Q
1—15	Gunnar Bergh	Sweden	>=14.50	Q
1—15	Hans-Heinrich Sievert	Germany	>=14.50	Q
1—15	Aleksa Kovačević	Yugoslavia	>=14.50	Q
1—15	József Darányi	Hungary	>=14.50	Q
1—15	Risto Kuntsi	Finland	>=14.50	Q
1—15	István Horváth	Hungary	>=14.50	Q
1—15	Karel Hoplíček	Czechoslovakia	>=14.50	Q
15—22	Antônio Lira	Brazil	<14.50	
15—22	Abdul Rahim	Afghanistan	<14.50	
15—22	Chen Baoqiu	Republic of China	<14.50	
15—22	Miroslav Vítek	Czechoslovakia	<14.50	
15—22	Jean Wagner	Luxembourg	<14.50	
15—22	Jules Noël	France	<14.50	
15—22	Shizuo Takada	Japan	<14.50	

=== Final ===
Rank	Athlete	Nation	1	2	3	4	5	6	Distance	Notes
1st place, gold medalist(s)	Hans Woellke	Germany	15.96	14.76	15.72	15.90	16.20 OR	14.98	16.20	OR
2nd place, silver medalist(s)	Sulo Bärlund	Finland	15.68	16.03 OR	14.98	15.52	16.12	15.42	16.12	
3rd place, bronze medalist(s)	Gerhard Stöck	Germany	15.56	15.56	15.14	15.29	14.78	15.66	15.66	
4	Sam Francis	United States	15.45	15.09	15.09	X	14.57	13.61	15.45	
5	Jack Torrance	United States	15.38	14.40	15.34	14.79	14.57	14.56	15.38	
6	Dimitri Zaitz	United States	15.32	14.16	14.09	14.09	X	14.85	15.32	
7	František Douda	Czechoslovakia	15.09	15.05	15.28	Did not advance			15.28	
8	Arnold Viiding	Estonia	14.72	14.31	15.23	Did not advance			15.23	
9	Gunnar Bergh	Sweden	14.83	15.01	14.51	Did not advance			15.01	
10	Hans-Heinrich Sievert	Germany	14.79	14.43	13.23	Did not advance			14.79	
11	Aleksa Kovačević	Yugoslavia	14.74	X	14.27	Did not advance			14.74	
12	József Darányi	Hungary	14.63	14.45	X	Did not advance			14.63	
13	Risto Kuntsi	Finland	X	14.20	14.61	Did not advance			14.61	
14	István Horváth	Hungary	13.66	14.18	14.32	Did not advance			14.32	
15	Karel Hoplíček	Czechoslovakia	14.12	13.72	13.34	Did not advance			14.12	
