= Athletics at the 1932 Summer Olympics – Men's discus throw =

Men's discus throw at the Games of the X Olympiad
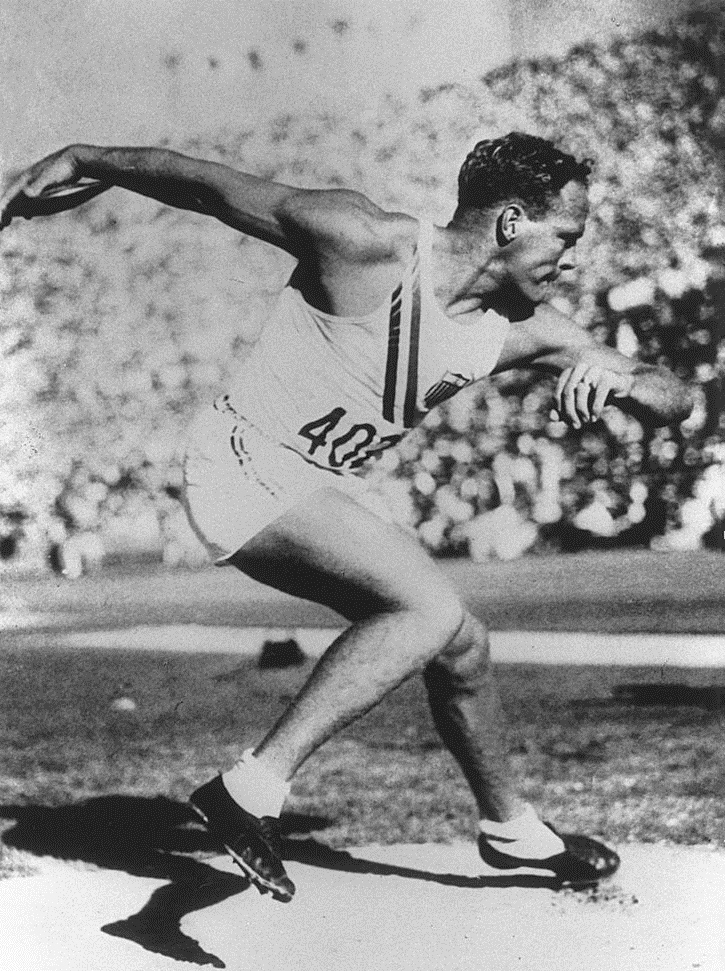
- John Anderson
- Venue: Los Angeles Memorial Coliseum
- Date: August 3, 1932
- Competitors: 18 from 11 nations
- Winning distance: 49.49 OR

Medalists
1st place, gold medalist(s)		John Anderson; United States
2nd place, silver medalist(s)		Henri LaBorde; United States
3rd place, bronze medalist(s)		Paul Winter; France

The men's discus throw event at the 1932 Olympic Games took place August 3. Eighteen athletes from 11 nations competed. The 1930 Olympic Congress in Berlin had reduced the limit from 4 athletes per NOC to 3 athletes. The event was won by John Anderson of the United States, the nation's third consecutive and sixth overall victory in the men's discus throw. Henri LaBorde took silver, marking the first time since 1908 that the same nation had the top two discus throwers. Paul Winter was the bronze medalist, earning France's first discus medal. Finland's four-Games podium streak ended, while the United States extended its streak to all nine appearances of the event.

== Background ==
This was the ninth appearance of the event, which is one of 12 athletics events to have been held at every Summer Olympics. The only returning finalist from 1928 was fifth-place finisher John Anderson of the United States. Anderson had won the 1932 AAU competition as well as the U.S. Olympic trials, beating world record holder and 1930 and 1931 AAU winner Paul Jessup.

Argentina and South Africa each made their debut in the men's discus throw. The United States made its ninth appearance, having competed in every edition of the Olympic men's discus throw to date.

== Competition format ==
The competition continued to use the single, divided-final format in use since 1896. Each athlete received three throws, with the top six receiving an additional three throws.

== Records ==
These were the standing world and Olympic records (in metres) prior to the 1932 Summer Olympics.

World record	Paul Jessup (USA)	51.73	Pittsburgh, United States	23 August 1930
Olympic record	Bud Houser (USA)	47.32	Amsterdam, Netherlands	1 August 1928

John Anderson and Henri LaBorde each bettered the Olympic record in their first throws, with LaBorde's 48.23 metres the better of the two. Anderson responded with a 48.86 metres throw in the second set, then increased his new record again to 49.39 metres in the third and 49.49 metres in the fourth. This stood as the new record. All six of Anderson's throws topped the old record; three of LaBorde's four legal throws did, and Paul Winter (twice) and Jules Noël (once) both surpassed the old record as well.

== Schedule ==
Date	Time	Round
Wednesday, 3 August 1932	14:30	Final

== Results ==
Rank	Athlete	Nation	1	2	3	4	5	6	Distance	Notes
1st place, gold medalist(s)	John Anderson	United States	47.87	48.86 OR	49.39 OR	49.49 OR	48.72	47.98	49.49	OR
2nd place, silver medalist(s)	Henri LaBorde	United States	48.23 OR	X	48.45	X	48.47	47.15	48.47	
3rd place, bronze medalist(s)	Paul Winter	France	45.89	47.16	46.72	47.34	42.45	47.85	47.85	
4	Jules Noël	France	44.85	44.26	46.42	47.74	45.07	46.38	47.74	
5	István Donogán	Hungary	X	44.25	47.08	X	X	X	47.08	
6	Endre Madarász	Hungary	39.32	46.52	40.51	44.50	X	X	46.52	
7	Kalevi Kotkas	Finland	43.62	45.87	42.44	Did not advance			45.87	
8	Paul Jessup	United States	39.14	43.97	45.25	Did not advance			45.25	
9	József Remetz	Hungary	43.65	45.02	X	Did not advance			45.02	
10	Emil Janausch	Austria	43.06	41.80	44.82	Did not advance			44.82	
11	Hans-Heinrich Sievert	Germany	X	38.92	44.51	Did not advance			44.51	
12	Harry Hart	South Africa	35.26	43.33	39.24	Did not advance			43.33	
13	Zygmunt Heljasz	Poland	42.59	X	41.55	Did not advance			42.59	
14	Emil Hirschfeld	Germany	X	42.42	41.74	Did not advance			42.42	
15	František Douda	Czechoslovakia	41.60	42.39	X	Did not advance			42.39	
16	Clément Duhour	France	X	38.92	40.22	Did not advance			40.22	
17	Veljko Narančić	Yugoslavia	36.51	34.52	X	Did not advance			36.51	
18	Pedro Elsa	Argentina	X	X	X	Did not advance			No mark	
—	Jesús Aguirre	Mexico	Did not start							
—	Bento Barros	Brazil	Did not start							
—	Héctor Berra	Argentina	Did not start							
—	Francisco Robledo	Mexico	Did not start							
—	Carmine Giorgi	Brazil	Did not start							
—	Antônio Giusfredi	Brazil	Did not start							
—	José Antonio Masó	Cuba	Did not start							
