= István Horváth (disambiguation) =

István Horváth (born 1935) is a former Hungarian communist politician.

István Horváth may refer to:

- István Horváth (politician, born 1970), Mayor of Szekszárd, Hungary
- István T. Horváth (born 1953), Hungarian-American chemist
- István Horváth (athlete) (1910–1976), Hungarian athlete
- István Horváth (physicist) (born 1963), Hungarian physicist, astronomer
