= Walter Wood =

Walter Wood may refer to:

- Walter Wood (athlete) (1914–1972), American Olympic athlete
- Walter Wood (freestyle skier) (born 1992), American freestyle skier
- Walter Wood (producer) (1921–2010), American film producer
- Walter Wood (Scouting) (1876–1981), Canadian active in the Boy Scouts
- Walter A. Wood (1815–1892), New York politician
- Walter Bertram Wood (1898–1917), World War I flying ace
- Walter W. Wood (1894–1980), American football player and a football, basketball, and baseball coach
- Walter Quarry Wood (1888–1958), Scottish surgeon
- Walter Childs Wood (1864–1953), American surgeon, state legislator, and trustee of the University of Connecticut

== See also ==
- Walter Woods (disambiguation)
- Wally Wood (Wallace Allan Wood, 1927–1981), American comic book writer, artist and publisher
