= Kurt Lundqvist =

Swedish high jumper

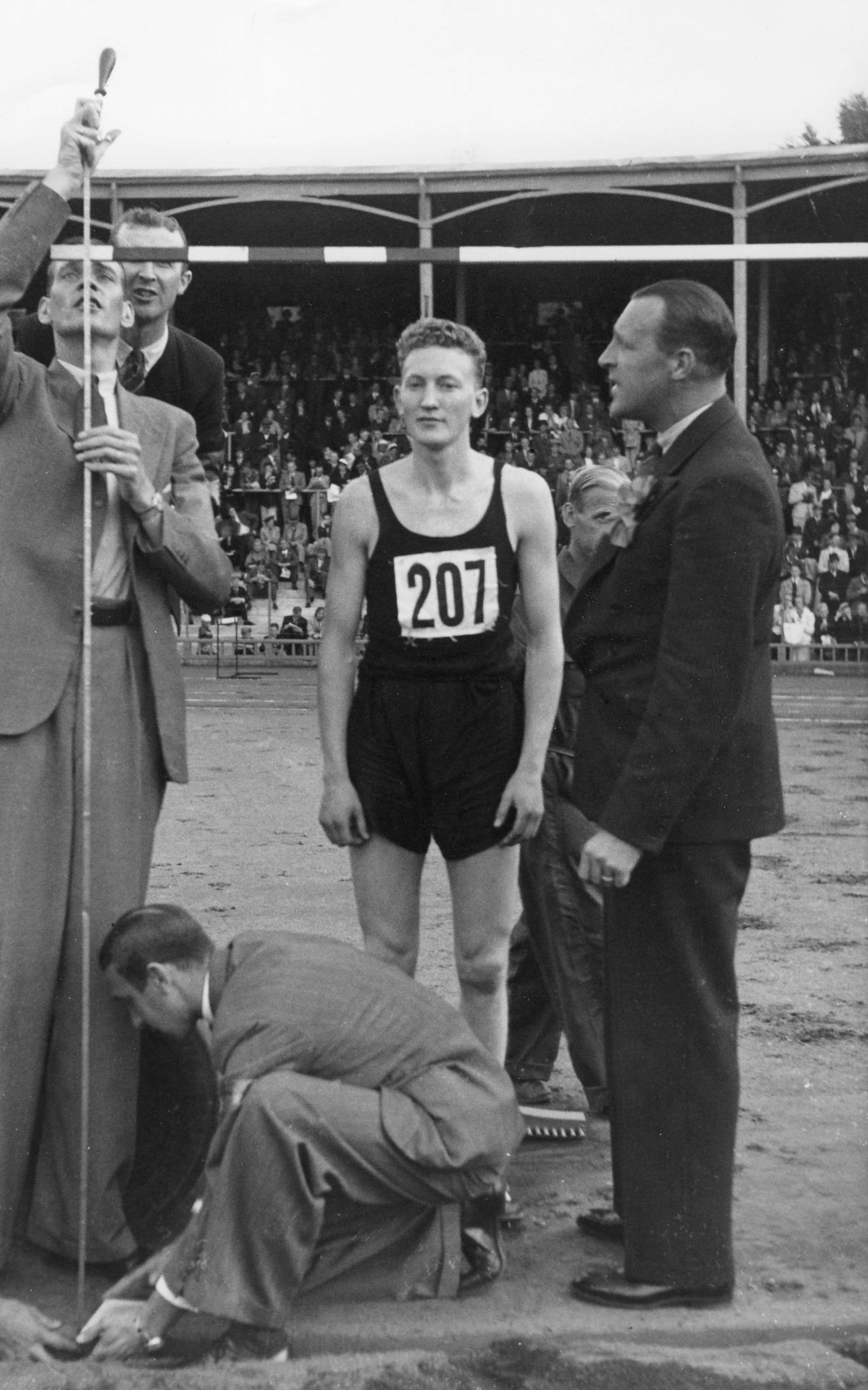
- Kurt Lundqvist in 1937

Personal information
- Born: 20 November 1914
- Died: 26 March 1976 (aged 61)

Sport
- Sport: Athletics
- Event: High jump

Achievements and titles
- Personal best: 1.98 m (1937)
Medal record
Men's athletics
Representing Sweden
European Athletics Championships
Gold medal – first place	1938 Paris	High jump

Kurt Lundqvist (20 November 1914 – 26 March 1976) was a Swedish track and field athlete who competed in the high jump. He was the 1938 European champion in the event.

He won his first national title in 1933 and established himself as the top Swedish competitor that decade with four further wins at the Swedish Athletics Championships from 1935 to 1938, interrupted only by Nils Bergström. He featured in the top three nationally in 1939, 1941 and 1942. A Swedish record came for Lundqvist in 1937 – his jump of 1.98 m (6 ft 5 3/4 in) improved Karl Österberg's twelve-year-old mark.

In the only major tournament outing of his international career, he won the gold medal at the 1938 European Athletics Championships in Paris in a near-personal best of 1.97 m (6 ft 5 1/2 in). His win at the second edition of this competition marked the beginning of a period of Swedish dominance in that event, with Anton Bolinder, Bengt Nilsson and Rickard Dahl maintaining the European title for Sweden at four of the following five editions. Lundqvist was also Sweden's first ever European champion in a jumping event and the second Swedish European field medallist after Harald Andersson.

For his achievements he was given the Stora grabbars märke for athletics (the 87th recipient of the award). He did not compete in a major event after 1938 and the onset of World War II the year after ended chance at further high level sports competition.

== See also ==
- List of European Athletics Championships medalists (men)
