= István Donogán =

Hungarian discus thrower

Personal information
- Born: 13 December 1897 Zenta, Kingdom of Hungary (now Senta, Serbia)
- Died: 25 November 1966 (aged 68) Budapest, Hungary
- Height: 186 cm (6 ft 1 in)
- Weight: 98 kg (216 lb)

Sport
- Sport: Athletics
- Event: Discus throw

Achievements and titles
- Personal best: 48.86 m (1934)
Medal record
Men's athletics
Representing Hungary
European Championships
Bronze medal – third place	1934 Turin	Discus throw

István Donogán (Hungarian pronunciation: [ˈiʃtvaːn ˈdonoɡaːn]; 13 December 1897 – 25 November 1966) was a Hungarian discus thrower. He competed in the Summer Olympic Games in 1928 and 1932 and was third at the European Championships in 1934.

== Career ==
Donogán competed in the 1928 Summer Olympics in Amsterdam, but only placed 17th with a throw of 41.78 m and failed to qualify for the final. Hungarian discus throwing experienced an upsurge in the early 1930s, with Donogán, József Remecz, Endre Madarász and Kálmán Marvalits all entering the international elite. Donogán won the Hungarian championship in 1931; his best throw that year was 47.99 m, which broke the official Hungarian record, but both Remecz and Madarász threw beyond 48 m the same year. Donogán, Remecz and Madarász were among the favorites at the 1932 Summer Olympics in Los Angeles, together with the Americans and the French; Donogán threw 47.08 m in the Olympic final and placed fifth. He was the top Hungarian, just ahead of Madarász, as European record holder Remecz underperformed.

Donogán placed third – again ahead of Remecz – at the 1934 European Athletics Championships in Turin, throwing 45.91 m. Donogán, who turned 37 that year, remains the oldest Hungarian medallist at the European championships. He won his second national discus title in 1935, the same year that he finished third behind Harald Andersson at the British 1935 AAA Championships.
