= 1938 European Athletics Championships – Men's high jump =

Men's high jump at the European Athletics Championships

The men's high jump at the 1938 European Athletics Championships was held in Paris, France, at Stade Olympique de Colombes on 5 September 1938.

== Medalists ==
Gold	Kurt Lundqvist; Sweden
Silver	Kalevi Kotkas; Finland
Bronze	Lauri Kalima; Finland

== Results ==
=== Final ===
5 September

Rank	Name	Nationality	Result	Notes
1st place, gold medalist(s)	Kurt Lundqvist	Sweden	1.97	
2nd place, silver medalist(s)	Kalevi Kotkas	Finland	1.94	
3rd place, bronze medalist(s)	Lauri Kalima	Finland	1.94	
4	Åke Ödmark	Sweden	1.90	
4	Erik Stai	Norway	1.90	
6	Jean Moiroud	France	1.85	
6	Hubert Stubbs	Great Britain	1.85	
8	Janós Cserna	Hungary	1.85	
9	Josef Cespiva	Czechoslovakia	1.80	
9	Jacques Mantran	France	1.80	
9	Ruggero Biancani	Italy	1.80	
12	Eugenio Donadoni	Italy	1.80	
13	Wim Spanjerdt	Netherlands	1.80	
14	J Wege	Luxembourg	1.70	

== Participation ==
According to an unofficial count, 13 athletes from 10 countries participated in the event.

- Czechoslovakia (1)
- Finland (2)
- France (2)
- Hungary (1)
- Italy (1)
- Luxembourg (1)
- Netherlands (1)
- Norway (1)
- Sweden (2)
- Great Britain (1)
