= Ling Peigeng =

Chinese discus thrower

Personal information
- Nationality: Chinese
- Born: 25 October 1912

Sport
- Sport: Athletics
- Event: Discus throw

Ling Peigeng (born 25 October 1912, date of death unknown) was a Chinese athlete. He competed in the men's discus throw at the 1936 Summer Olympics.
