= Åke Hedvall =

Swedish discus thrower (1910–1969)

Personal information
- Born: 9 April 1910 Västerfärnebo, Sweden
- Died: 7 April 1969 (aged 58) Västerfärnebo

Åke Hedvall (9 April 1910 – 7 April 1969) was a Swedish discus thrower. He was born in Västerfärnebo.

He competed at the 1936 Summer Olympics in Berlin, where he placed 8th in the final.
