= Lauri Kalima =

Finnish high jumper

Personal information
- Nationality: Finnish
- Born: 29 September 1916
- Died: 24 July 2004 (aged 87)

Sport
- Sport: Athletics
- Event: High jump
Medal record
Men's athletics
Representing Finland
European Championships
Bronze medal – third place	1938 Paris	High jump

Lauri Kalima (29 September 1916 – 24 July 2004) was a Finnish athlete. He competed in the men's high jump at the 1936 Summer Olympics.
