= Shizuo Takada (athlete) =

Japanese shot putter

Personal information
- Nationality: Japanese
- Born: 5 March 1909
- Died: 10 December 1963 (aged 54)

Sport
- Sport: Athletics
- Event: Shot put

Shizuo Takada (高田 静雄, Takada Shizuo; 5 March 1909 – 10 December 1963) was a Japanese track and field athlete. He competed in the men's shot put at the 1936 Summer Olympics. He later made a name for himself as a photographer.
