= Karel Hoplíček =

Czech shot putter

Personal information
- Nationality: Czechoslovak
- Born: 15 December 1913
- Died: 1964 (aged 50–51)

Sport
- Sport: Athletics
- Event: Shot put

Karel Hoplíček (15 December 1913 – 1964) was a Czechoslovak athlete. He competed in the men's shot put at the 1936 Summer Olympics.
