= Willy Schröder =

German discus thrower (1912–1990)

Personal information
- Nationality: British ()
- Born: 7 March 1912 Magdeburg, German Empire
- Died: 28 September 1990 (aged 78) Gersfeld, West Germany
- Height: 184 cm (6 ft 0 in)
- Weight: 87 kg (192 lb)

Sport
- Sport: Athletics
- Event: xx
- Club: Viktoria Magdeburg
Medal record
Men's athletics
Representing Germany
European Championships
Gold medal – first place	1938 Paris	Discus throw

Wilhelm Otto "Willy" Schröder (7 March 1912 – 28 September 1990) was a German athlete who competed at the 1936 Summer Olympics.

== Biography ==
In 1935, Schröder set a discus world record of 53.10 m in a competition in his hometown of Magdeburg.

At the 1936 Olympic Games in Berlin, Schröder competed in the men's discus throw event, finishing in 5th place.

He finished second behind Nikolaos Syllas in the discus throw event at the 1937 AAA Championships.

Records
Preceded by (Sweden) Harald Andersson	World record holder in men's discus throw 28 April 1935 – 20 June 1941	Succeeded by (United States) Archie Harris
