= Guo Jie =

Chinese discus thrower (1912–2015)

Guo Jie (Chinese: 郭洁; pinyin: Guō Jié; January 16, 1912 – November 15, 2015) was a Chinese Olympic athlete who competed at the 1936 Summer Olympics in Berlin, where he was eliminated before reaching the final of the men's discus throw event. A multi-sport athlete in high school, Guo was inspired to attend the Olympics after hearing about Liu Changchun's participation at the 1932 Summer Games. He became the national discus throw champion at the 1935 Chinese National Games and set a new national record shortly before his journey to Berlin.

Following the Olympics, Guo traveled to Japan, where he graduated with a degree in agricultural sciences from the University of Tokyo in 1942. He taught at Peking University until 1952, at which point he transferred to the city of Xi'an to work in the local grain bureau. He served for many years at the Xi'an Institute of Physical Education as a researcher and coach before his retirement. At the time of his death, he was the last surviving member of China's delegation to the 1936 Summer Olympics. He helped carry the Olympic torch to the 2008 Summer Olympics in Beijing.

== Early life and athletic career ==
Guo was born in Dalian on January 16, 1912, although some sources claim that he was born in Lüshunkou District (then the Port Arthur Naval Base) on November 11, 1911. In either case, he attended high school in Port Arthur and participated in basketball, association football, and track and field, most prominently in the discus throw. It was in this sport that he was crowned champion at the 1935 Chinese National Games, where he also finished fourth in the pentathlon and competed in the shot put event.

Guo had been inspired to attend the Olympic Games after reading about Liu Changchun's participation at the 1932 Summer Games in Los Angeles. In May 1936 Guo set a new national record in the discus throw with distance of 41.07 m, which qualified him to join the Chinese delegation to the 1936 Summer Olympics. The team was burdened with a lack of financial backing, and Guo was provided no coach or training equipment. He competed in the men's discus throw event but, despite achieving a personal best throw of 41.13 m, his efforts were not enough to qualify him for the final and he was eliminated.

Soon after returning from the Olympics he began attending the University of Tokyo, graduating in 1942 with a degree in agricultural science and technology during the Second Sino-Japanese War. He then returned to China to teach agricultural economics at Peking University. Following the establishment of the People's Republic of China in 1949, he was transferred to Xi'an, the capital of the Shaanxi province, in 1952 to work in the grain bureau. During this period he participated in discus, shot put, and javelin throw in the Shaanxi Provincial Games.

== Later life and death ==
In 1954 Guo became a researcher and coach at the Xi'an Institute of Physical Education and continued his work long after his official retirement in 1987. The results of his research, which focused on health and longevity, were published in booklets and distributed for free across the country. Before the 2008 Summer Olympics in Beijing, he helped carry the Olympic torch through the streets of Xi'an. As of 2007 he was the last surviving member of China's delegation to the 1936 Summer Olympics. In 2012, he turned 100, and was still able to exercise for two hours daily. He died on November 15, 2015, at the age of 103. At the time of his death, he was believed to be the oldest surviving Olympian, and was believed to be succeeded in this respect by Ingeborg Sjöqvist.
