= Nikola Kleut =

Serbian discus thrower

Personal information
- Nationality: Serbian
- Born: 20 February 1908
- Died: 28 March 1946 (aged 38)

Sport
- Sport: Athletics
- Event: Discus throw

Nikola Kleut (20 February 1908 – 28 March 1946) was a Serbian athlete. He competed in the men's discus throw at the 1936 Summer Olympics, representing Yugoslavia.
