= Hans Fritsch =

German discus thrower

Personal information
- Born: 9 August 1911 Königsberg, East Prussia, German Empire (current Kaliningrad, Russia)
- Died: 24 August 1987 (aged 76) Bremen, West Germany

Hans Fritsch (9 August 1911 – 24 August 1987) was a German discus thrower. He was born in Königsberg in East Prussia, the current Kaliningrad, Russia.

Fritsch competed at the 1936 Summer Olympics in Berlin, where he placed 11th in the final. He was flagbearer for the German team at the 1936 Olympics.

He served with the Wehrmacht Luftwaffe during World War II, as part of the general staff, and was later a Bundeswehr officer in the German Air Force.
