= Aleksa Kovačević =

Yugoslav athlete

Personal information
- Nationality: Yugoslav
- Born: 1 February 1910 Grabovica, Condominium of Bosnia and Herzegovina, Austria-Hungary
- Died: 22 August 1979 (aged 69)

Sport
- Sport: Athletics
- Event: Shot put

Aleksa Kovačević (1 February 1910 – 22 August 1979) was a Yugoslavian athlete. He competed in the men's shot put at the 1936 Summer Olympics, representing Yugoslavia.
