= Chen Baoqiu =

Chinese shot putter

Personal information
- Nationality: Chinese
- Born: 30 January 1911

Sport
- Sport: Athletics
- Event: Shot put

Chen Baoqiu (born 30 January 1911, date of death unknown) was a Chinese athlete. He competed in the men's shot put at the 1936 Summer Olympics.
