= Jaroslav Vítek =

Czech shot putter and discus thrower (1915–1966)

Personal information
- Nationality: Czechoslovak
- Born: 14 January 1915 Mořice, Moravia, Austria-Hungary
- Died: 15 May 1966 (aged 51) Brno, Czechoslovakia
- Height: 205 cm (6 ft 9 in)
- Weight: 115 kg (254 lb)

Sport
- Sport: Athletics
- Events: Shot put, discus trow
- Club: Sokol Brno 1

Jaroslav Vítek (14 January 1915 – 15 May 1966) was a Czech athlete. He was specialized in shot put and also competed in discus throwing.

He represented Czechoslovakia at the 1938 European Athletics Championships in Paris in the shot put event finishing sixth with a distance of 14.77 metres. He also competed in the discus throw event finishing 14th with a throw of 41.18 metres.

His discus throw personal best was 15.38 metres, thrown in 1939.
