= Valér Barač =

Slovak discus thrower

Personal information
- Nationality: Slovak
- Born: 16 July 1909 Malá Vieska, Austria-Hungary
- Died: 11 August 1991 (aged 82) Košice, Czechoslovakia

Sport
- Sport: Athletics
- Event: Discus throw
- Club: VŠ Bratislava

Valér Barač (16 July 1909 – 11 August 1991) was a Slovak athlete. He competed in the men's discus throw at the 1936 Summer Olympics.
