= Henri LaBorde =

American discus thrower

- Henri LaBorde in 1931

Personal information
- Born: September 11, 1909 San Francisco, United States
- Died: September 16, 1993 (aged 84) Portland, United States
- Education: Stanford University
- Height: 183 cm (6 ft 0 in)
- Weight: 95 kg (209 lb)

Sport
- Sport: Athletics
- Events: Discus throw, shot put
- Club: Olympic Club, San Francisco

Achievements and titles
- Personal best: DT – 50.38 (1933)
Medal record
Representing the United States
Olympic Games
Silver medal – second place	1932 Los Angeles	Discus throw

Henri Jean LaBorde (September 11, 1909 – September 16, 1993) was an American discus thrower who won a silver medal at the 1932 Olympics. He attended Lowell High School in an Francisco. Next year he won the NCAA and the IC4A titles and had a world's best throw of 50.38 m while on a European tour in Düsseldorf. He also occasionally competed in the shot put.
