= Yugoslavia at the 1932 Summer Olympics =

- Flag of the Kingdom of Yugoslavia
- IOC code: YUG
- NOC: Yugoslav Olympic Committee

in Los Angeles
- Competitors: 1 in 1 sport
- Flag bearer: Veljko Narančić
- Medals: Gold 0 Silver 0 Bronze 0 Total 0

Summer Olympics appearances (overview)
- 1920; 1924; 1928; 1932; 1936; 1948; 1952; 1956; 1960; 1964; 1968; 1972; 1976; 1980; 1984; 1988; 1992; 1996; 2000

Other related appearances
- Serbia (1912, 2008–); Croatia (1992–); Slovenia (1992–); Bosnia and Herzegovina (1992 S–); Independent Olympic Participants (1992 S); North Macedonia (1996–); Serbia and Montenegro (1996–2006); Montenegro (2008–); Kosovo (2016–)

Just one athlete from the Kingdom of Yugoslavia competed at the 1932 Summer Olympics in Los Angeles, United States.

== Athletics ==
Men

Athlete	Event	Qualification		Final	
Athlete	Event	Result	Rank	Result	Rank
Veljko Narančić	Discus throw	37.35	8	did not advance	
