= Mořice =

- Municipality
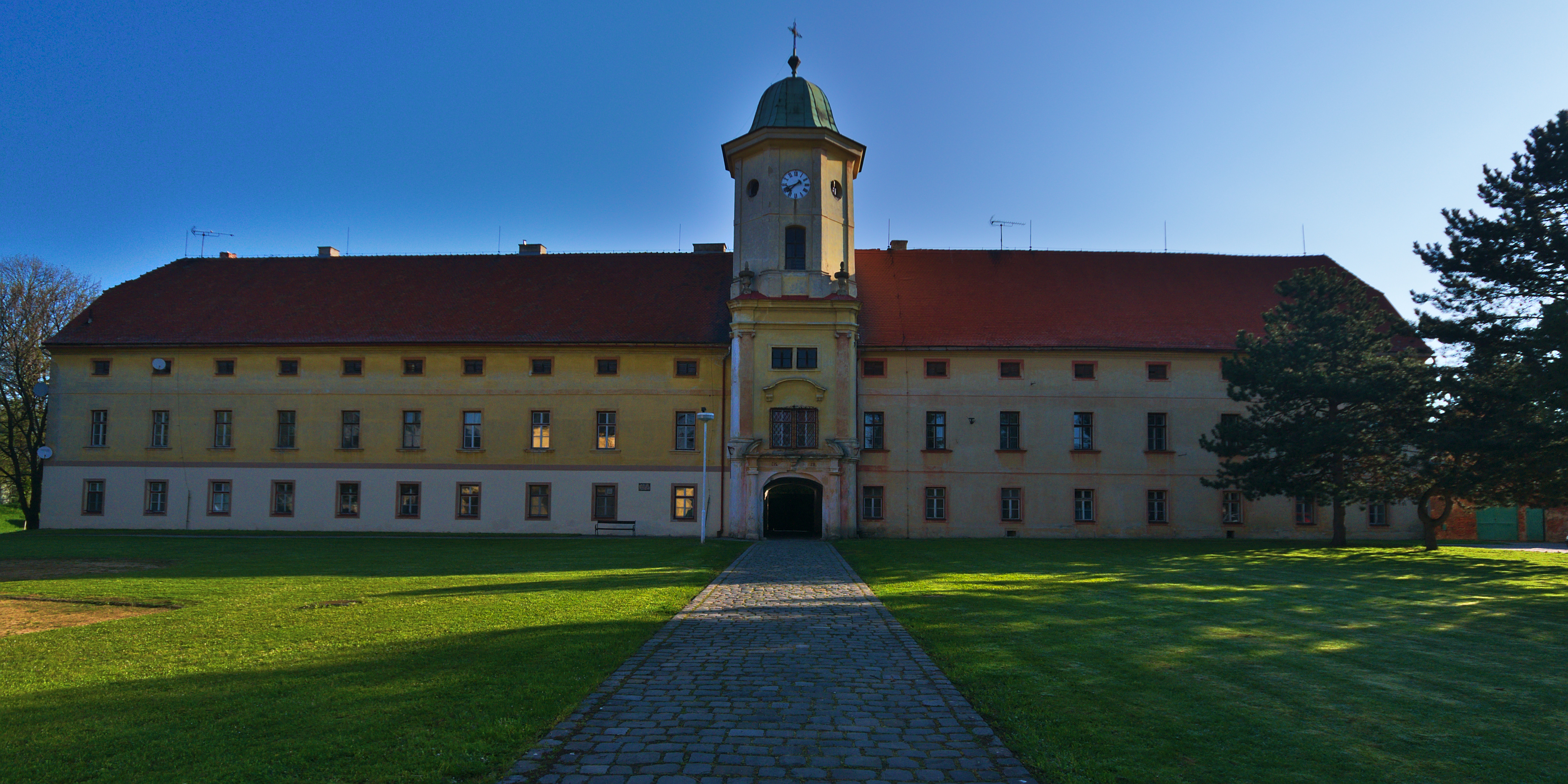
- Mořice Castle

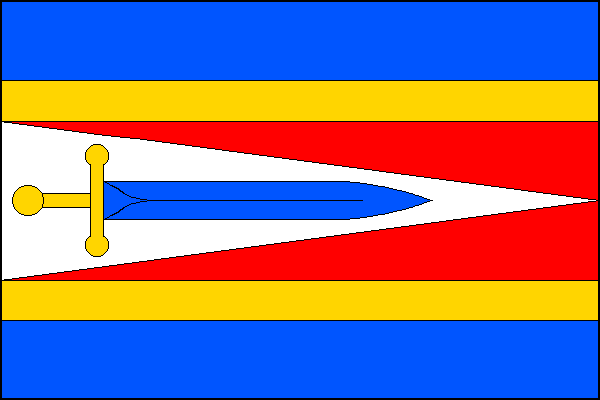
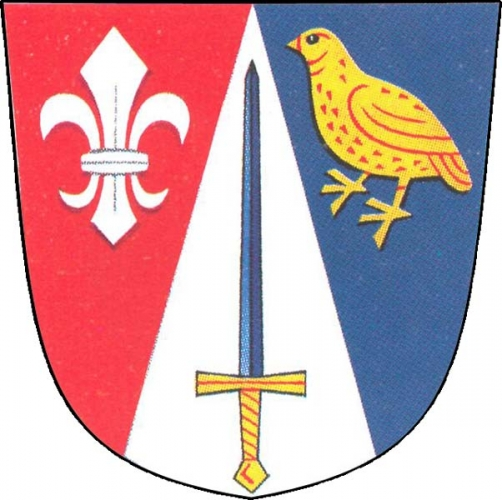
- Flag Coat of arms

- Location in the Czech Republic
- Coordinates: 49°19′50″N 17°11′49″E
- Country: Czech Republic
- Region: Olomouc
- District: Prostějov
- First mentioned: 1238

Area
  - Total: 4.51 km^{2} (1.74 sq mi)
- Elevation: 206 m (676 ft)

Population (2026-01-01)
  - Total: 531
  - Density: 118/km^{2} (305/sq mi)
- Time zone: UTC+1 (CET)
  - Summer (DST): UTC+2 (CEST)
- Postal code: 798 28
- Website: www.morice.cz

Mořice is a municipality and village in Prostějov District in the Olomouc Region of the Czech Republic. It has about 500 inhabitants.

Mořice lies approximately 18 kilometres (11 mi) south of Prostějov, 31 km (19 mi) south of Olomouc, and 218 km (135 mi) south-east of Prague.

== Demographics ==
Historical population
Year	Pop.	±%
1869	409	—
1880	538	+31.5%
1890	501	−6.9%
1900	545	+8.8%
1910	556	+2.0%
1921	581	+4.5%
1930	570	−1.9%
1950	537	−5.8%
1961	575	+7.1%
1970	562	−2.3%
1980	531	−5.5%
1991	483	−9.0%
2001	474	−1.9%
2011	482	+1.7%
2021	494	+2.5%
Source: Censuses

== Notable people ==
- Jaroslav Vítek (1915–1966), athlete
