= Ingeborg Sjöqvist =

Swedish diver

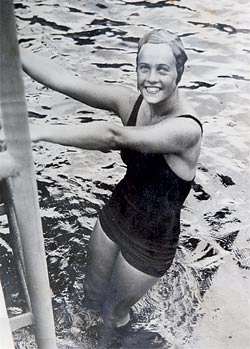
- Ingeborg Sjöqvist at the 1936 Olympics

Personal information
- Born: 19 April 1912 Kalmar, Sweden
- Died: 22 November 2015 (aged 103) Rydebäck, Sweden

Sport
- Sport: Diving
- Club: Kalmar SS
Medal record
Representing Sweden
Women's diving
European Championships
Silver medal – second place	1931 Paris	10 m platform
Silver medal – second place	1934 Magdeburg	10 m platform

Ingeborg Maria Ingers (née Sjöqvist; 19 April 1912 – 22 November 2015) was a Swedish diver.

== Biography ==
Ingeborg Sjöqvist was born on 19 April 1912 in Kalmar, Sweden. She had an older sister, Lala (1903–1964), who was an Olympic medalist diver.

She won two silver medals in the 10 meter platform event at the European championships, in 1931 and 1934. She competed in the platform at the 1932 and 1936 Summer Olympics and finished in fourth and ninth place, respectively. Her elder sister Lala won a bronze medal in the platform at the 1928 Olympics.

Later in life Ingers recalled that her home town's diving board was 3 m shorter than regulation, and thus she had to stand on a built-up scaffold to train for her 10 m event. She turned 100 in April 2012 and was the world's oldest living Olympian from the death of Guo Jie until her own one week later. In 1939, she married Lennart Ingers (born 14 April 1915), who also became a centenarian in April 2015, after 75 years of marriage. Lennart died on 5 November 2015, just 2 weeks and 3 days before Ingeborg.
