= Ken Carpenter (discus thrower) =

American discus thrower

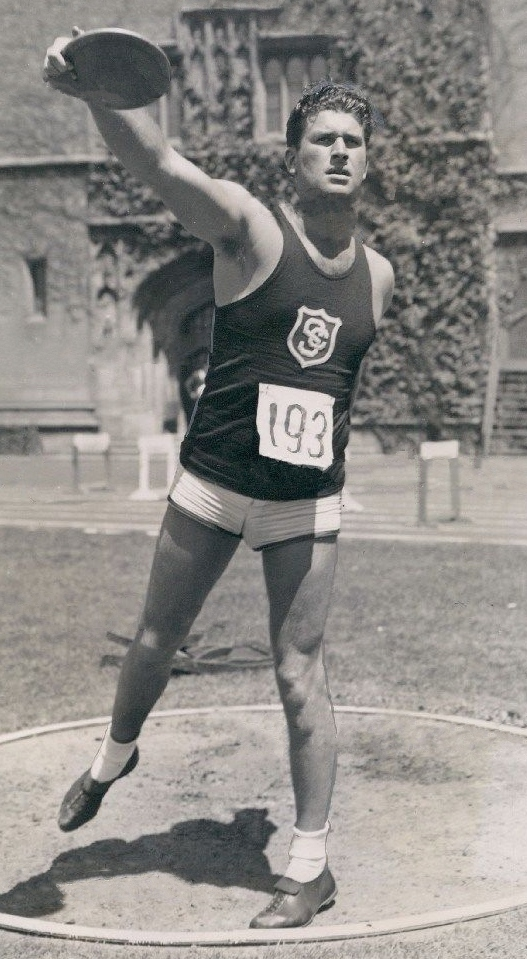
- Carpenter in 1936

Personal information
- Full name: William Kenneth Carpenter
- Born: April 19, 1913 Compton, California, U.S.
- Died: March 15, 1984 (aged 70) Buena Park, California, U.S.
- Education: University of Southern California
- Height: 6 ft 3 in (1.90 m)
- Weight: 225 lb (102 kg)

Sport
- Country: United States
- Sport: Athletics
- Event: Discus throw
- Club: USC Trojans, Los Angeles

Achievements and titles
- Personal best: 53.08 m (1936)
Medal record
Men's athletics
Representing the United States
Olympic Games
Gold medal – first place	1936 Berlin	Discus throw

William Kenneth Carpenter (April 19, 1913 – March 15, 1984) was an American discus thrower. He won the NCAA and AAU titles in 1935 and 1936, becoming the first two-time NCAA champion in a weight throw event from the University of Southern California (USC). In 1936 Carpenter won an Olympic gold medal, and between 1936 and 1940 held the American record in the discus.

Carpenter graduated from Compton High School, where he was a track and field star. After attending USC, he went on to serve in the United States Navy, and then began a 33-year-long career as a coach and teacher at the College of the Sequoias and Compton Community College. In 2003 he was inducted into the USC Athletic Hall of Fame.

Carpenter appears in Leni Riefenstahl's film Olympia about the 1936 Olympic Games. He is also mentioned by Viktor Chemmel, a character in Markus Zusak's 2006 bestselling novel The Book Thief.
