= Walter Woods =

Walter Woods may refer to:

- Walter Woods (screenwriter) (1881–1942), American screenwriter
- W. O. Woods, U.S. Treasurer
- Walt Woods (1875–1951), baseball player
- Tyrone Woods (Walter Tyrone Woods, born 1969), baseball player
- Walter Woods (politician) (1861–1939), Australian politician

== See also ==
- Walter Wood (disambiguation)
