= Kalevi Kotkas =

Estonian-born Finnish track and field athlete

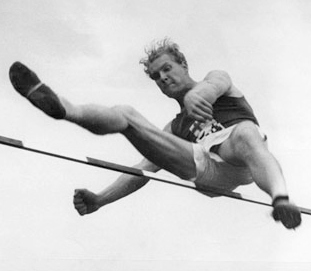

Personal information
- Full name: Kalevi Kotkas
- Nationality: Estonian, Finnish
- Born: 10 August 1913 Tallinn, Governorate of Estonia, Russian Empire
- Died: 24 August 1983 (aged 70) Vantaa, Finland
- Height: 194 cm (6 ft 4 in)
- Weight: 100 kg (220 lb)

Sport
- Country: Finland
- Sport: Athletics
- Events: High jump, discus throw, shot put
- Club: Helsingin Kisa-Veikot

Achievements and titles
- Personal bests: HJ – 2.04 m (1936); DT – 51.27 m (1937); SP – 15.55 m (1938)
Medal record
Men's athletics
Representing Finland
European Championships
Gold medal – first place	1934 Turin	High jump
Silver medal – second place	1938 Paris	High jump

Kalevi Kotkas (10 August 1913 – 24 August 1983) was an Estonian-born Finnish athlete, specializing in high jump, discus throw and shot put. He became the first ever European champion in high jump, in 1934 in Turin, and competed in the 1932 and 1936 Summer Olympics. In 1936 he cleared the same height of 2.00 m as the medalists Dave Albritton and Delos Thurber, but made more attempts and was placed fourth.

Kalevi Kotkas set four European records in high jump, but two of them – achieved in Rio de Janeiro in 1934 – were never ratified. The ratified records were 2.03 meters (Helsinki, 12 July 1936) and 2.04 meters (Gothenburg, 1 September 1936).

== National titles ==
- Finnish Athletics Championships
  - High jump: 1934, 1935, 1936, 1937, 1938
  - Discus throw: 1933, 1934, 1935, 1936, 1937, 1938

== International competitions ==
Year	Competition	Venue	Position	Event	Notes
Representing Finland
1932	Olympic Games	Los Angeles, US	7th	Discus throw	45.87 m
1934	European Championships	Turin, Italy	1st	High jump	2.00 m
1934	European Championships	Turin, Italy	10th	Discus throw	42.50 m
1936	Olympic Games	Berlin, Germany	4th	High jump	2.00 m
1936	Olympic Games	Berlin, Germany	21st (q)	Discus throw	x
1938	European Championships	Paris, France	2nd	High jump	1.94 m
1938	European Championships	Paris, France	4th	Discus throw	48.63 m
1938	European Championships	Paris, France	11th	Shot put	13.92 m
