= Johann Wotapek =

Austrian discus thrower

Personal information
- Born: 23 September 1908
- Died: 7 March 1982 (aged 73)

Johann Wotapek, also known as Schani (23 September 1908 – 7 March 1982), was an Austrian athlete, an Olympic competitor in discus in 1936, the Austrian national champion in discus four times and in shot put three times.

== Life ==
Wotapek, originally from Sankt Pölten in Lower Austria, competed internationally at the 1931 Workers' Summer Olympiad in Vienna and the 1936 Summer Olympics in Berlin, where he placed 9th in the discus throw final. He was also considered likely to be a competitor in the abandoned 1940 Helsinki Olympics.

Wotapek competed extensively in sporting events within Austria and Germany. He was three times Austrian national champion in the shot put in 1939, 1940 and 1943, and four times national champion in the discus in 1935, 1936, 1937 and 1943.

He worked as a policeman in Vienna, where he was a member of the PSV (Polizei Sport Verein) and represented the police at international sporting competitions. He was also a sports teacher.

During the war he became captain of the German light athletics team, and for this reason he had after the war to defend himself against the charge of Nazism, which he was able to do successfully.
