= Paul Jessup (athlete) =

American athletics competitor

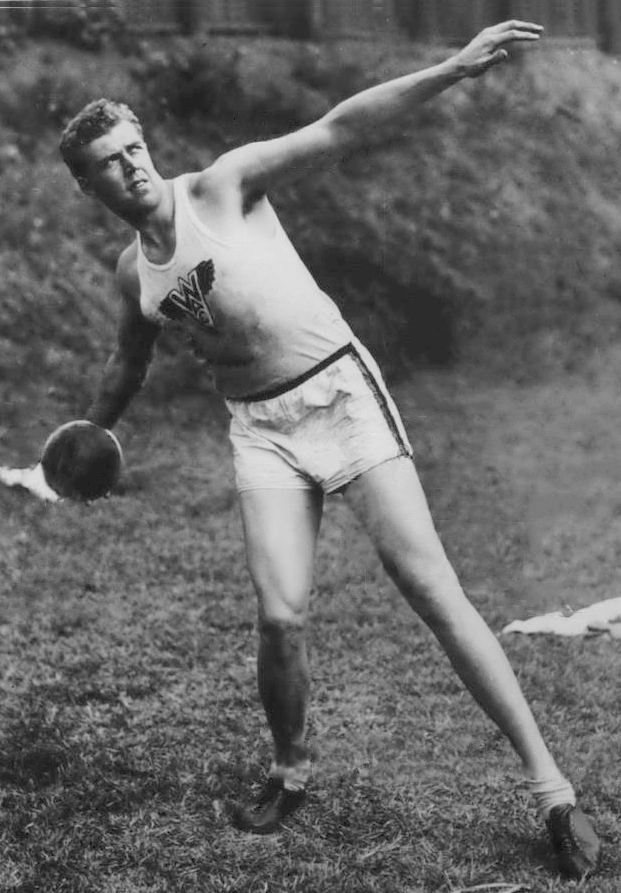
- Jessup in 1930

Personal information
- Born: September 23, 1908 Bellingham, Washington, U.S.
- Died: October 27, 1992 (aged 84) Palm Beach, Florida, U.S.
- Height: 198 cm (6 ft 6 in)
- Weight: 97 kg (214 lb)

Sport
- Sport: Athletics
- Events: Shot put, discus throw
- Club: WAC, Seattle

Achievements and titles
- Personal bests: SP – 15.44 m (1930); DT – 51.73 m (1930)

Paul Boulet Jessup (September 23, 1908 – October 27, 1992) was an American discus thrower and shot putter. He set a discus world record in 1930 and was a leading favorite for the 1932 Summer Olympics, but only placed eighth in the Olympic final.

== Career ==
Competing for the University of Washington Huskies, Jessup placed fourth at the 1929 NCAA Championships in both the shot and the discus. He was also the captain of the Washington football team, playing offensive tackle and defensive center. Jessup improved further in 1930, setting his personal bests that year. In an early dual meet against Stanford University, he threw the discus 48.23 meters (158 ft 2 7/8 in) and was only narrowly beaten by Stanford's world record holder Eric Krenz. At the 1930 NCAA Championships Jessup went one better by surprisingly beating Krenz; nevertheless, Krenz was selected by coaches as top All-American ahead of Jessup.

Jessup won his first national championship in the discus in August 1930, beating Krenz's world record in the process with a throw of 51.73 meters (169 ft 7 7/8 in). This record lasted until 1934, when it was beaten by Sweden's Harald Andersson. Jessup repeated as national champion in 1931.

Jessup showed consistent form in early 1932 and was considered the leading favorite for the Summer Olympics in Los Angeles, as his main rival, Krenz, had drowned in a boating accident in August 1931. However, 1928 Olympian John Anderson displaced him as the national leader at the Eastern Tryouts. At the final Olympic Trials Jessup placed second, behind Anderson. Anderson went on to win the gold medal at the Olympics, while Jessup had an off day, only managing 8th with a throw of 45.25 m (148 ft 4 in).

Records
Preceded by (United States) Eric Krenz	Men's Discus World Record Holder; August 23, 1930 – August 25, 1934	Succeeded by (Sweden) Harald Andersson
