= Petre Havaleț =

Romanian discus thrower

Personal information
- Nationality: Romanian
- Born: 27 June 1909
- Died: June 1995

Sport
- Sport: Athletics
- Event: Discus throw

Petre Pavel Havaleț (27 June 1909 - June 1995) was a Romanian athlete. He competed in the men's discus throw at the 1936 Summer Olympics.
