= István Horváth (athlete) =

Hungarian shot putter

Personal information
- Nationality: Hungarian
- Born: 12 July 1910
- Died: 15 July 1976 (aged 66)

Sport
- Sport: Athletics
- Event: Shot put

István Horváth (12 July 1910 – 15 July 1976) was a Hungarian athlete. He competed in the men's shot put at the 1936 Summer Olympics. He was born in Budapest.
