= Walter Wood (athlete) =

American discus thrower

Personal information
- Born: January 3, 1914 Port Richmond, New York, U.S.
- Died: January 5, 1972 (aged 58) Boston, Massachusetts
- Height: 6 ft 5 in (1.96 m)
- Weight: 215 lb (98 kg)

Sport
- Sport: Athletics
- Event: Discus throw

Walter Wood (January 3, 1914 – January 1972) was an American athlete. He competed in the men's discus throw at the 1936 Summer Olympics.
