= Ed Flanagan (athlete) =

American hammer thrower

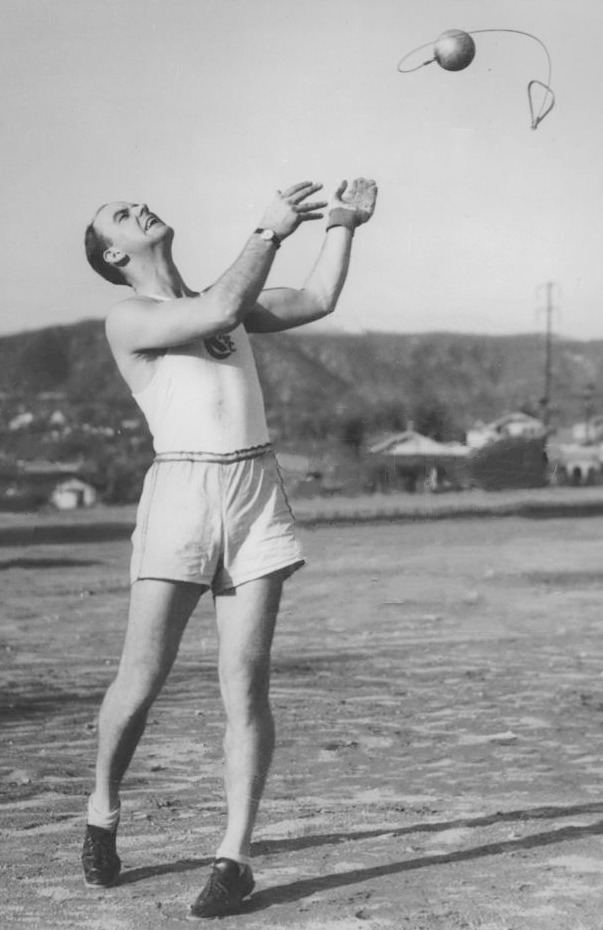
- Flanagan in 1931

Personal information
- Born: April 10, 1910
- Died: August 1, 1978 (aged 68)

Sport
- Sport: Athletics
- Event: Hammer throw
- Club: Boston Athletic Association

Achievements and titles
- Personal best: 50.82 m (1931)

Edward F. Flanagan (April 10, 1910 – August 1, 1978) was an American hammer thrower. He won the national title in 1931, placed third in 1930, and finished sixth in 1932.
