= Västerfärnebo =

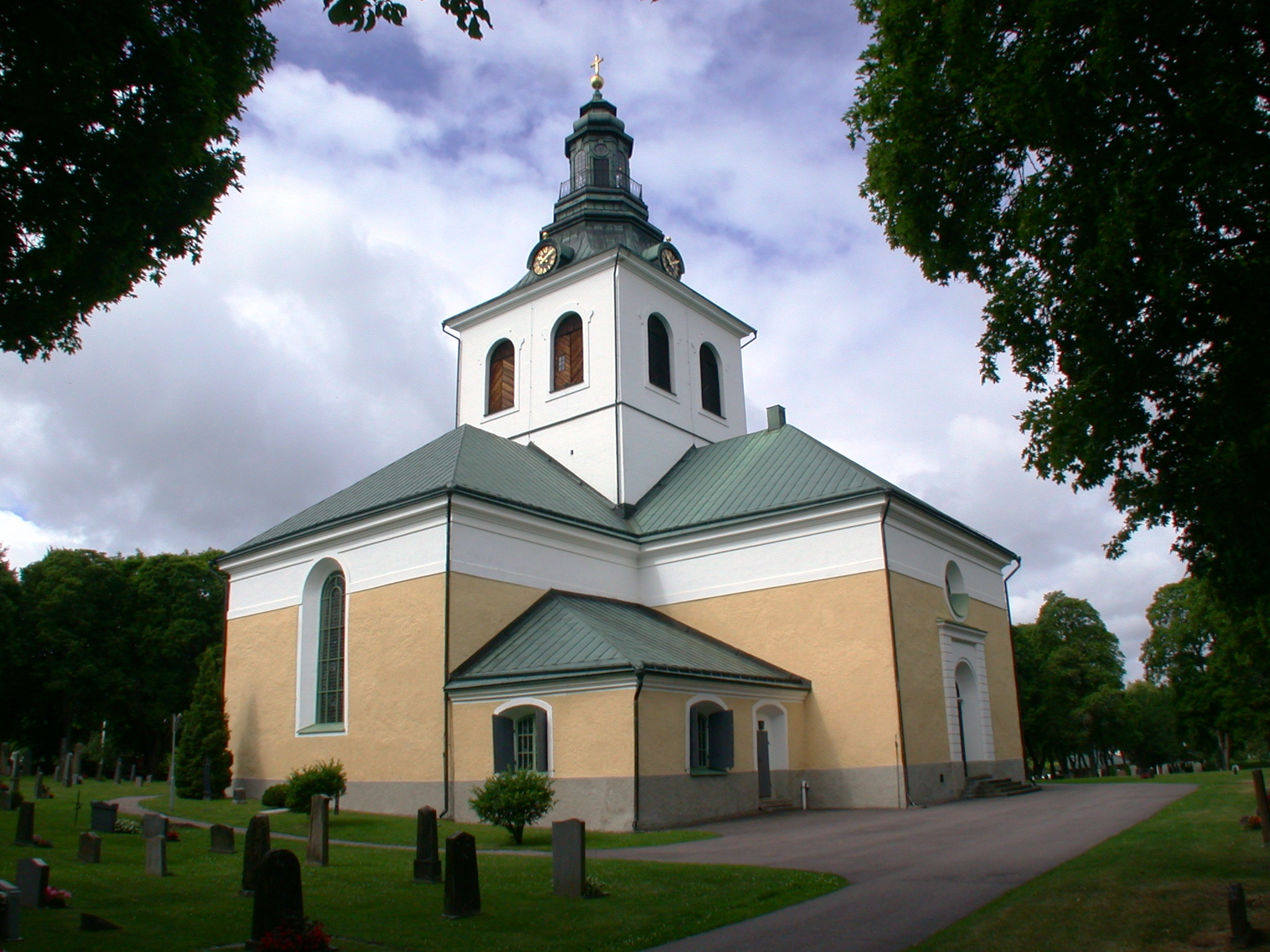
- Västerfärnebo Church in July 2008

- Location within Västmanland Location within Sweden
- Coordinates: 59°57′N 16°17′E
- Country: Sweden
- Province: Västmanland
- County: Västmanland County
- Municipality: Sala Municipality

Area
  - Total: 0.96 km^{2} (0.37 sq mi)

Population (31 December 2010)
  - Total: 477
  - Density: 496/km^{2} (1,280/sq mi)
- Time zone: UTC+1 (CET)
  - Summer (DST): UTC+2 (CEST)

Västerfärnebo (Swedish pronunciation: [vɛstɛrˈfæ̂ːɳɛbʊ]) is a locality situated in Sala Municipality, Västmanland County, Sweden with 477 inhabitants in 2010.
