= Eric Krenz =

American shot putter and discus thrower

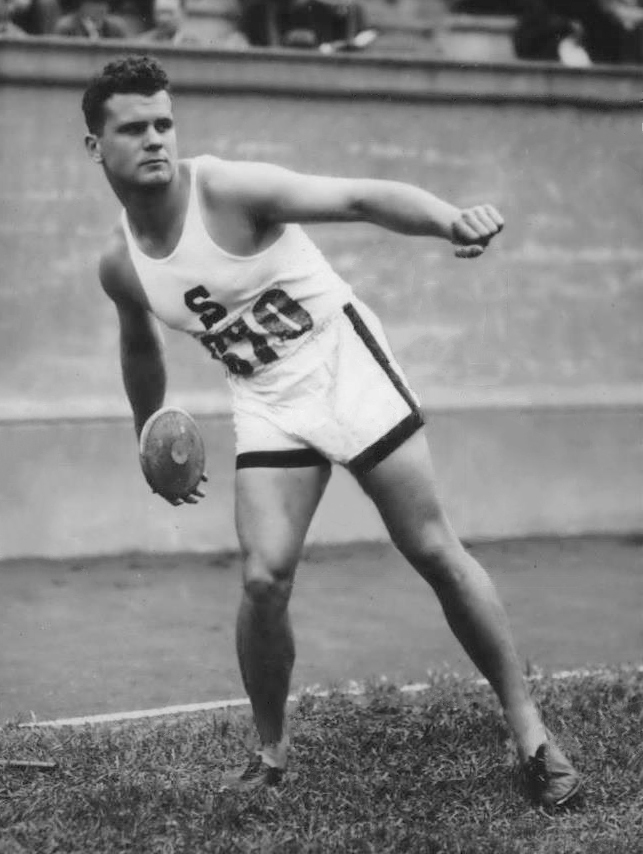
- Krenz in 1929

Personal information
- Born: May 7, 1906 Stockton, California, U.S.
- Died: August 18, 1931 (aged 25) Emerald Bay, Lake Tahoe, U.S.
- Height: 185 cm (6 ft 1 in)
- Weight: 95 kg (209 lb)

Sport
- Sport: Athletics
- Events: Shot put, discus throw
- Club: Stanford Cardinal
- Coached by: Dink Templeton

Achievements and titles
- Personal bests: SP – 15.73 m (1930); DT – 51.03 m (1930)

Eric Christian William Krenz (May 7, 1906 – August 18, 1931) was an American shot putter and discus thrower. Krenz set two world records in the discus and was considered a favorite for the 1932 Summer Olympics, but his career was cut short when he drowned at age 25.

== Biography ==
Krenz was one of the leading stars of coach Dink Templeton's Stanford University team. He won the discus throw at the 1927 national championships with a throw of 44.75 m (146 ft 10 in). In April 1928, he threw beyond Bud Houser's official discus world record of 48.20 m (158 ft 1 3/4 in) several times in practice.

Krenz won both of his events at the 1928 IC4A Championships, leading Stanford to their second straight team championship. He also won the discus at the 1928 NCAA Championships and placed second in the shot, helping Stanford win that team title as well with a record 72 points. Krenz was heavily favored to make the US Olympic team in the discus; however, at the Olympic Trials he was only successful in the shot put, placing fourth to just make the team. Team leaders considered entering him in both events anyway, but eventually decided not to. Krenz placed fourth in the Olympic shot put final, behind teammates Johnny Kuck and Herman Brix and Germany's Emil Hirschfeld.

Krenz officially broke the discus world record in March 1929, adding more than five feet to Houser's mark with a throw of 49.90 m (163 ft 8 3/4 in). He repeated as IC4A discus champion, helping Stanford win the team title by the largest margin in 30 years. He also regained his national discus title, throwing a new meeting record of 47.90 m (157 ft 2 in). At the NCAA Championships, however, he only managed 2nd in the shot and 6th in the discus.

Krenz became the first man to break 50 meters in the discus in 1930, throwing 51.03 m (167 ft 5 3/8 in) at an intercollegiate meet in Palo Alto, California. An earlier throw in the same series also broke the previous world record but was not officially ratified. Two weeks later he won his third IC4A discus title, with a new meeting record of 49.01 m (160 ft 9 3/4 in), but Stanford lost the team championship to University of Southern California. At the NCAA Championships he was surprisingly beaten by Washington's Paul Jessup, who went on to also win the national title that year, breaking Krenz's world record as he did so.

Krenz continued his throwing career after graduating from Stanford, joining the San Francisco Olympic Club. He was considered a favorite for the approaching Summer Olympics in Los Angeles.

Krenz drowned at Lake Tahoe on August 18, 1931. He had been rowing on the lake with a girl when he decided to take a swim; he was stricken by either cramps or a heart attack and drowned, the girl unable to help him.

Records
Preceded by (United States) Bud Houser	Men's Discus World Record Holder; March 9, 1929 – August 23, 1930	Succeeded by (United States) Paul Jessup
