= Veljko Narančić =

Croatian shot putter and discus thrower

Personal information
- Born: 26 May 1898 Donji Lapac, Kingdom of Croatia-Slavonia, Austria-Hungary
- Died: 6 February 1983 (aged 84) Zagreb, SR Croatia, SFR Yugoslavia
- Height: 1.92 m (6 ft 4 in)

Sport
- Sport: Track and field
- Events: Shot put Discus throw
- Club: HŠK Concordia

Achievements and titles
- Personal bests: Discus throw: 46.00 (1936); Shot put: 14.24 (1933)

Veljko Narančić (26 May 1898 – 6 February 1983) was a Croatian athlete who competed for the Kingdom of Yugoslavia in the 1920s and 1930s. He was a three-time Olympian and appeared at the 1924, 1932 and 1936 Summer Olympics, competing in shot put and discus throw, without winning any medals.

== Olympic results ==
Event	1924	1932	1936
Shot put	13th 13.215	—N/a	—N/a
Discus throw	18th 37.350	17th 36.510	14th AC QR

Olympic Games
Preceded by Dmitrije Stefanović	Flagbearer for (Kingdom of Yugoslavia) Yugoslavia; Los Angeles 1932	Succeeded by Milan Stepinšek
