= Giorgio Oberweger =

Italian athletics competitor

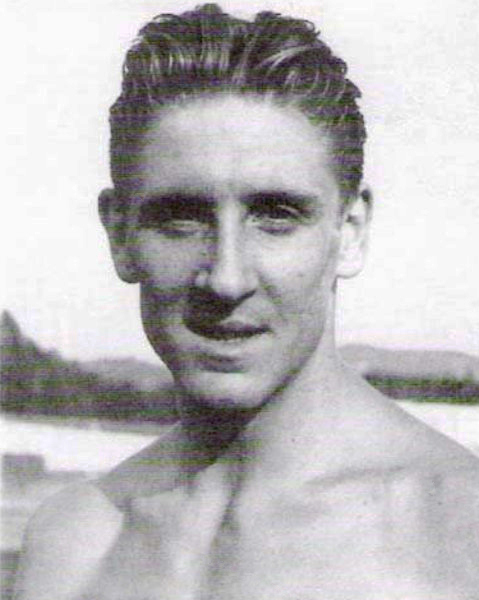
- Oberweger in 1936

Personal information
- Nationality: Italian
- Born: 22 December 1913 Trieste, Austria-Hungary
- Died: 14 October 1998 (aged 84) Rome, Italy
- Education: University of Bologna
- Height: 189 cm (6 ft 2 in)
- Weight: 82 kg (181 lb)

Sport
- Country: Italy
- Sport: Athletics
- Events: Discus throw, hurdles
- Club: Giovinezza

Achievements and titles
- Personal best: DT – 51.49 m (1938)
Medal record
Men's athletics
Representing Italy
Summer Olympics
Bronze medal – third place	1936 Berlin	Discus throw
European Championships
Silver medal – second place	1938 Paris	Discus throw

Giorgio Oberweger (22 December 1913 – 14 October 1998) was an Italian discus thrower who won a bronze medal at the 1936 Olympics and a silver at the 1938 European Championships. He placed sixth at the 1934 European Championships and 15th at the 1948 Olympics. Oberweger won five national titles, in the discus throw (1934 and 1936–1938) and 110 metres hurdles (1939).

== Biography ==
Oberweger graduated in law from the University of Bologna, but later favoured engineering-related occupations. In 1938, he obtained a pilot license and fought as a fighter pilot during World War II, receiving three medals for bravery. Between 1946 and 1960, he was the head coach of the Italian athletics team. Then, until 1967, he worked at the Italian Athletics Federation and until 1972 at the Italian Central School of Sport.
