= Antônio Lira =

Brazilian shot putter

Personal information
- Nationality: Brazilian
- Born: 13 November 1909
- Died: 23 August 1963 (aged 53)

Sport
- Sport: Athletics
- Event: Shot put

Antônio Lira (13 November 1909 – 23 August 1963) was a Brazilian athlete. He competed in the men's shot put at the 1932 Summer Olympics and the 1936 Summer Olympics.
