= Sulo Bärlund =

Finnish shot putter (1910–1986)

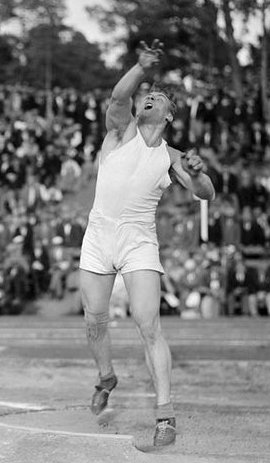
- Sulo Bärlund in 1935

Personal information
- Born: 15 April 1910 Kangasala, Finland
- Died: 13 April 1986 (aged 75) Kangasala, Finland
- Height: 1.86 m (6 ft 1 in)
- Weight: 87 kg (192 lb)

Sport
- Sport: Athletics
- Event: Shot put
- Club: Tampereen Pyrintö, Tampere

Achievements and titles
- Personal best: 16.23 m (1936)
Medal record
Representing Finland
Olympic Games
Silver medal – second place	1936 Berlin	Shot put

Sulo Richard Bärlund (15 April 1910 – 13 April 1986) was a Finnish shot putter who won a silver medal at the 1936 Summer Olympics. At the European Championships he finished fourth in 1938 and sixth in 1946.
