= Harald Andersson =

Swedish discus thrower

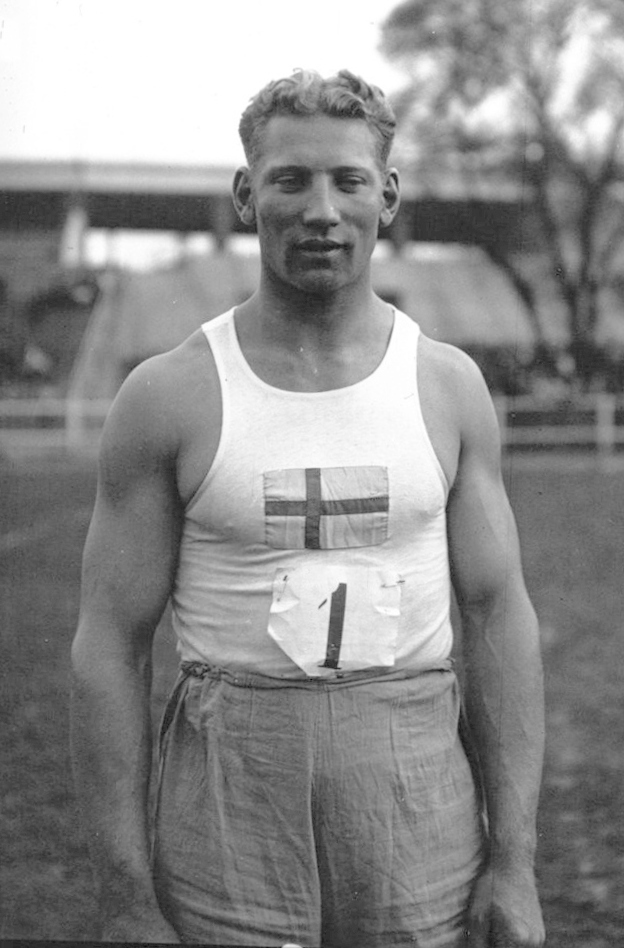
- Harald Andersson in 1934

Personal information
- Born: 2 April 1907 Stanford, California, United States
- Died: 18 May 1985 (aged 78) Nynäshamn, Sweden
- Height: 191 cm (6 ft 3 in)
- Weight: 99 kg (218 lb)

Sport
- Sport: Athletics
- Event: Discus throw
- Club: IFK Falun

Achievements and titles
- Personal best: 53.02 m (1935)
Medal record
Men's athletics
Representing Sweden
European Championships
Gold medal – first place	1934 Turin	Discus throw

Harald "Slaktarn" Andersson (2 April 1907 – 18 May 1985) was a Swedish discus thrower. In 1934 he won a European title and held the world record for eight months. The same year he was awarded the Svenska Dagbladet Gold Medal.

== Biography ==
Andersson was Swedish champion in every year from 1932 to 1935 and the world's best discus thrower in 1934 and 1935. He broke Paul Jessup's world record of 51.73 m twice in one competition (a dual meet between the Swedish and Norwegian teams in Oslo) on 25 August 1934, throwing first 52.20 m and then 52.42 m; the latter mark was officially ratified by the IAAF. At the European Championships in Turin two weeks later Andersson threw 50.38 m and won by more than three meters from Paul Winter and István Donogán.

Andersson lost his world record in April 1935, when Germany's Willy Schröder threw 53.10 m in Magdeburg; however, he remained the world's top thrower, as Schröder was less consistent at a high level and suffered from health problems over the summer. Andersson won both the Swedish and British AAA Championships titles that year, the latter at the 1935 AAA Championships. On 13 October he improved his Swedish record to 53.02 m in Örebro.

He was a leading favorite for the 1936 Summer Olympics in Berlin, but injured himself before the Games; he attempted to throw in the qualification, but only managed about 38.5 metres and failed to qualify for the final.

Records
Preceded by (United States) Paul Jessup	World record holder in men's discus throw 25 August 1934 – 28 April 1935	Succeeded by (Germany) Willy Schröder
