= Ruggero Biancani =

Italian athlete

Personal information
- Nationality: Italian
- Born: 25 January 1915 San Giovanni in Persiceto, Italy
- Died: 6 February 1993 (aged 78) Bologna, Italy

Sport
- Country: Italy
- Sport: Athletics
- Event(s): Discus throw High jump

Achievements and titles
- Personal best: Discus throw: 49.26 (1941)

Ruggero Biancani (25 January 1915 – 6 February 1993) was an Italian versatile athlete (he was a discus thrower and high jumper), who competed at the 1936 Summer Olympics.
