= Yrjö Korholin-Koski =

Finnish long-distance runner

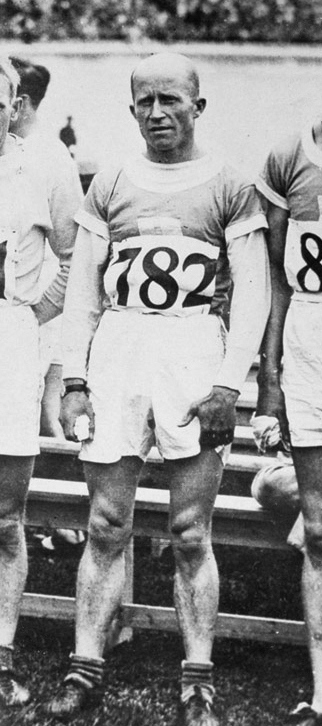
- Korholin-Koski at the 1928 Olympics

Personal information
- Born: 3 May 1900 Helsinki, Finland
- Died: 2 March 1978 (aged 77) Lake Worth, Florida, United States
- Height: 165 cm (5 ft 5 in)
- Weight: 54 kg (119 lb)

Sport
- Sport: Athletics
- Event: marathon
- Club: Helsingin Kullervo, Helsinki

Achievements and titles
- Personal best: Marathon – 2:35:26 (1926)

Yrjö Korholin-Koski (3 May 1900 – 2 March 1978) was a Finnish long-distance runner. Korholin-Koski emigrated to the United States in 1924. He competed in the marathon at the 1928 Summer Olympics and finished seventh. He competed in the 50,000-meter walk in 1932.
