= Sol Furth =

American triple jumper

Personal information
- Nationality: American
- Born: March 23, 1907 Fort Lauderdale, Florida, United States
- Died: October 18, 1990 (aged 83) Fort Lauderdale, Florida, United States

Sport
- Sport: Athletics
- Event: Triple jump

Sol Furth (March 23, 1907 – October 18, 1990) was an American athlete. He competed in the men's triple jump at the 1932 Summer Olympics.
