= Reidar Sørlie =

Norwegian discus thrower

Reidar Sørlie (12 March 1909 – 12 February 1969) was a Norwegian discus thrower.

He finished fourth at the 1936 Summer Olympics with a throw of 48.77 metres and eighth at the 1938 European Championships with 46.36 metres. He became Norwegian champion in the years 1936-1939. The Norwegian championships were cancelled from 1940-1945 due to World War II. Despite choosing a career as a driver, he was always known by his nickname: The Discus Thrower.

His personal best discus throw was 51.57 metres, achieved in September 1937 in Sarpsborg.
