= Emil Janausch =

Austrian discus and hammer thrower

Personal information
- Nationality: Austrian
- Born: 14 December 1901 Alt-Erlaa, Vienna, Austria
- Died: 21 May 1960 (aged 58) Atzgersdorf, Vienna, Austria
- Height: 183 cm (6 ft 0 in)
- Weight: 84 kg (185 lb)

Sport
- Sport: Athletics
- Event(s): Discus throw Hammer throw
- Club: Wiener AF

Emil Janausch (14 December 1901 – 21 May 1960) was an Austrian athlete who competed at two Olympic Games.

== Biography ==
Janausch finished second behind Endre Madarász in the discus throw event at the 1931 AAA Championships and the 1933 AAA Championships. Janausch competed in the men's discus throw at the 1932 Summer Olympics and the 1936 Summer Olympics.
