= Jean Wagner =

Luxembourgish athletics competitor

Personal information
- Nationality: Luxembourgish
- Born: 28 December 1905
- Died: 24 February 1978 (aged 72)

Sport
- Sport: Athletics
- Events: Shot put Discus

Jean Wagner (28 December 1905 – 24 February 1978) was a Luxembourgish athlete. He competed in the men's shot put and the men's discus throw at the 1936 Summer Olympics.
