= John Anderson (discus thrower) =

American discus thrower (1907–1948)

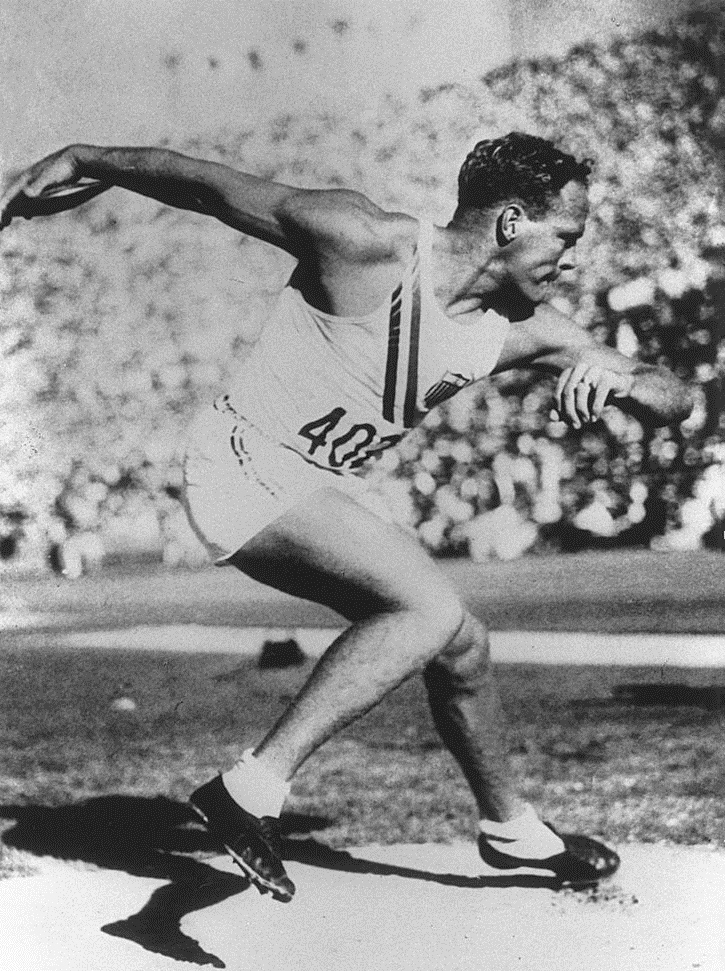
- John Anderson at the 1932 Olympics

Personal information
- Born: July 4, 1907 Cincinnati, Ohio, United States
- Died: July 11, 1948 (aged 41) Naknek, Alaska, United States
- Height: 1.91 m (6 ft 3 in)
- Weight: 97 kg (214 lb)

Sport
- Sport: Athletics
- Events: Discus throw, shot put
- Club: NYAC, New York

Achievements and titles
- Personal bests: DT – 50.62 m (1936); SP – 15.01 m (1933)
Medal record
Men's athletics
Representing the United States
Olympic Games
Gold medal – first place	1932 Los Angeles	Discus throw

John Franklin Anderson (July 4, 1907 – July 11, 1948) was an American athlete who competed mainly in the discus throw. He won the gold medal in this event at the 1932 Summer Olympics held in Los Angeles.

Anderson graduated from Cornell University in 1929, where he was a member of the Quill and Dagger society.

Prior to graduation from Cornell, he placed fifth at the 1928 Olympics in the discus throw. He later improved to beat the world record holder, Paul Jessup, at the 1932 Final Trials. He then took the gold medal in Los Angeles with a new Olympic record. He won the AAU title in 1933 and in June 1936 he had the best throw of his career in winning the Eastern Olympic Trials, 165-9 (50.62 m), but he failed to make a third consecutive Olympic team. Anderson was also an above-average performer with the shot (49 feet) and won the 1929 IC4A indoor shot put title. While at Cornell, Anderson played tackle on the football team for three years, was on the track team for three years, captaining it as a senior, and was president of the student council in his last year. Anderson was thought by Hollywood to have "dazzling masculine beauty" and after the 1932 Olympics he stayed on in California to star in the film Search for Beauty (the role went to Buster Crabbe). Later, experience gained in the Pacific during World War II as a lieutenant commander in the naval reserve led to his obtaining a post as chief navigator of a salmon fishing fleet. While on an expedition some 700 miles north of Anchorage, he suffered a brain hemorrhage and died immediately, aged only 41.
