= Endre Madarász =

Hungarian discus thrower

Personal information
- Nationality: Hungarian
- Born: 8 November 1909 Szerbittabé, Serbia
- Died: 5 May 1976 (aged 66) Budapest, Hungary
- Height: 184 cm (6 ft 0 in)
- Weight: 86 kg (190 lb)

Sport
- Sport: Athletics
- Event: Discus
- Club: Szegedi AK/BSZKRT

Endre Madarász (8 November 1909 – 5 May 1976) was a Hungarian athlete who competed in the 1932 Summer Olympics and in the 1936 Summer Olympics.

== Biography ==
Madarász born in Szerbittabé, won the British AAA Championships title in the discus event at the 1931 AAA Championships.

In his first Olympic Games (Los Angeles) in 1932 he participated in the men's discus throw and finished in sixth place. Four years later in Berlin, he was eliminated in the qualifying event of the discus competition.

Madarász won another the British AAA Championships discus title at the 1933 AAA Championships.

He died in Budapest.
