= Gunnar Bergh =

Swedish discus thrower and shot putter

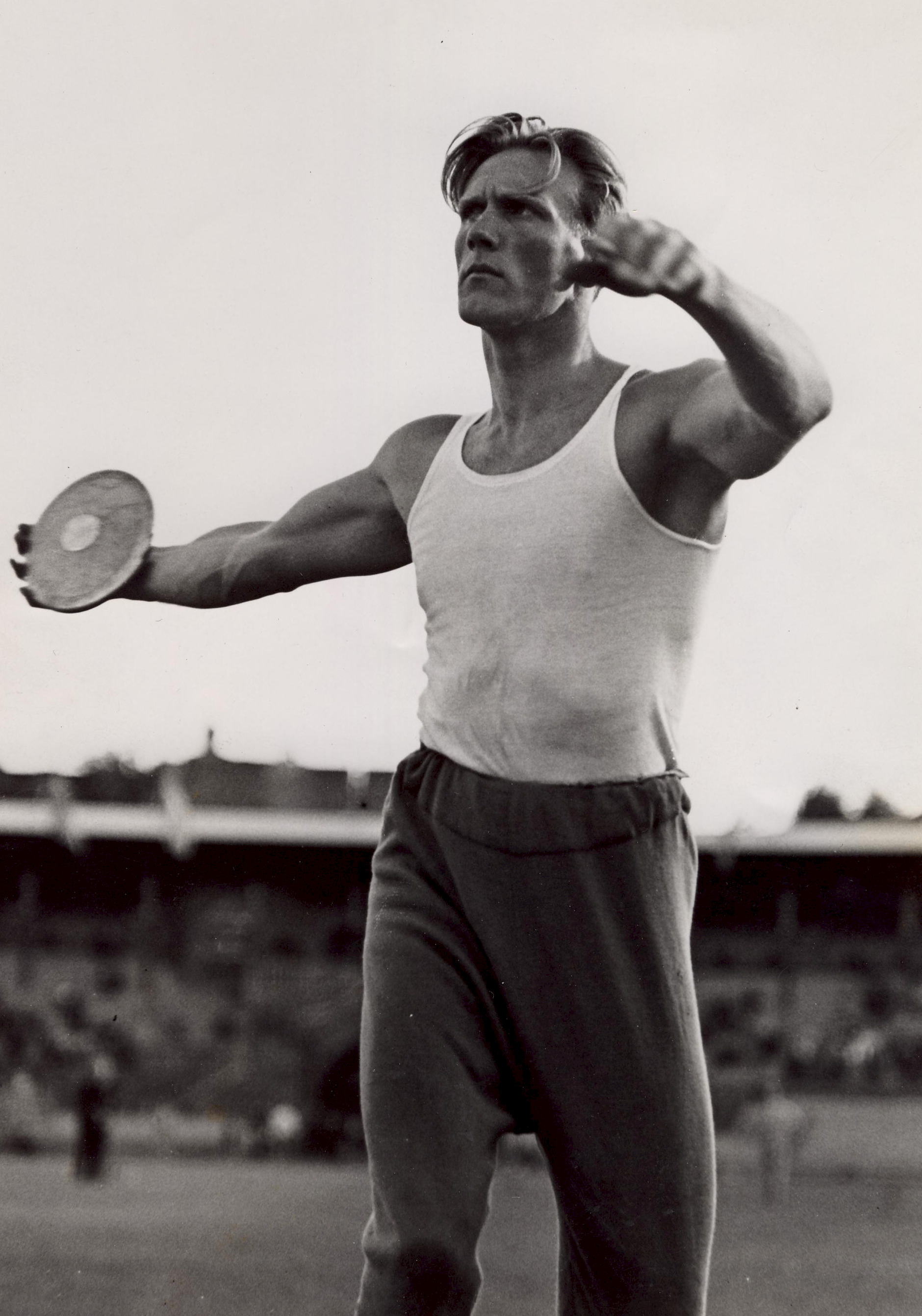

Personal information
- Born: 20 March 1909 Kinna, Sweden
- Died: 25 January 1986 (aged 76) Sätila, Sweden
- Height: 1.96 m (6 ft 5 in)
- Weight: 96 kg (212 lb)

Sport
- Sport: Athletics
- Event(s): Shot put, discus throw
- Club: Göteborgs Polismäns IF

Achievements and titles
- Personal best(s): SP – 15.84 m (1936); DT – 51.72 m (1936)
Medal record
Men's athletics
Representing Sweden
European Championships
Bronze medal – third place	1938 Paris	Discus throw

Sten Gunnar Bergh (20 March 1909 – 25 January 1986) was a Swedish athlete who specialized in the shot put and discus throw. He competed in these events at the 1936 Summer Olympics and finished in ninth and seventh place, respectively.

At the 1938 European Championships Bergh won a bronze medal in the discus and finished fifth in the shot put. He won the Swedish titles in the shot put in 1935–42 and 1937–41 and in the discus in 1943–44. Bergh improved the Swedish shot put record several times, and his last record stood for 11 years.

Bergh trained as a boxer before changing to athletics, and worked as a policeman in Gothenburg. His daughter Wivianne also became an Olympic discus thrower.
