= Paul Winter (athlete) =

French athlete

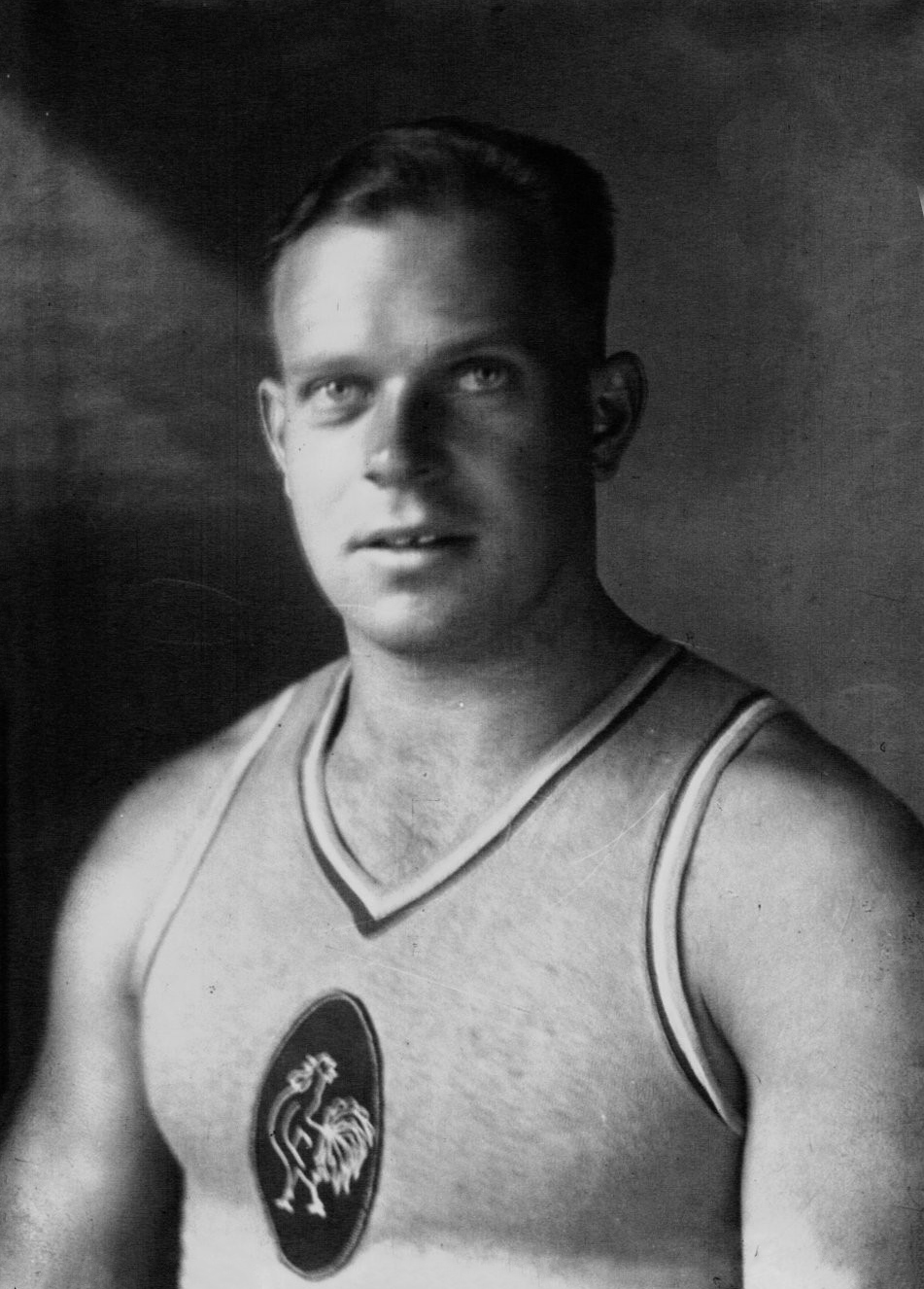

Medal record

Men's athletics

Representing France

Olympic Games
Bronze medal – third place	1932 Los Angeles	Discus throw

European Championships
Silver medal – second place	1934 Turin	Discus throw

Paul Winter (February 6, 1906 – February 22, 1992) was a French athlete who competed mainly in the discus throw and also shotput. He was born in Ribeauvillé, Haut-Rhin.

He competed for a France in the 1932 Summer Olympics held in Los Angeles, in the discus throw where he won the bronze medal and also the 1936 Summer Olympics held in Berlin, Germany where he failed to qualify.

He also won four French championships in 1931,1933, 1935 and 1937.
