= Jules Noël (athlete) =

French athletics competitor

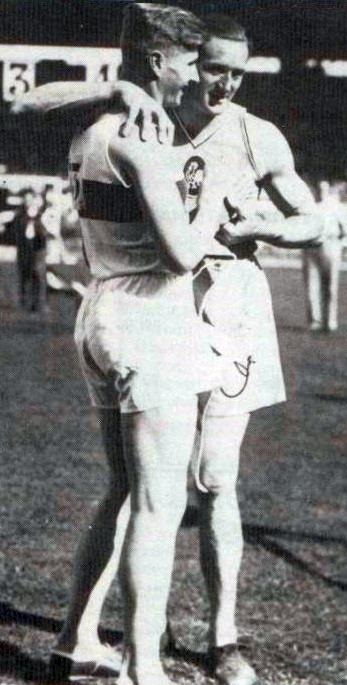
- Noël in 1938

Personal information
- Born: 27 January 1903 Norrent-Fontes, Pas-de-Calais, France
- Died: 19 May 1940 (aged 37) near Escaudœuvres, Nord, France
- Occupations: French soldier, athlete
- Height: 6 ft 3 in (191 cm)
- Weight: 198 lb (90 kg)
Medal record
Men's Athletics: Shot put & Discus
Representing France
Championnats de France d'athlétisme
Silver medal – second place	August 1927	Shot
Silver medal – second place	July 1928	Shot
Gold medal – first place	July 1928	Discus
Gold medal – first place	July 1929	Shot
Gold medal – first place	July 1929	Discus
Gold medal – first place	July 1930	Shot
Gold medal – first place	July 1930	Discus
Silver medal – second place	June 1932	Shot
Gold medal – first place	June 1932	Discus
Bronze medal – third place	July 1933	Shot
Silver medal – second place	July 1933	Discus
Bronze medal – third place	July 1934	Shot
Gold medal – first place	July 1934	Discus
Gold medal – first place	July 1936	Shot
Gold medal – first place	July 1936	Discus
Gold medal – first place	July 1938	Shot
Gold medal – first place	July 1938	Discus
Gold medal – first place	July 1939	Shot
Gold medal – first place	July 1939	Discus

Jules Noël (27 January 1903 – 19 May 1940) was a French athlete who competed in discus and shot put at two European Athletics Championships and three Olympic Games.

== Biography ==
Jules Noël was born on 27 January 1903 in Norrent-Fontes, Pas-de-Calais, France. He joined the French Army and rose to the rank of Sergeant.

=== Career ===
After an impressive silver medal at the Championnats de France d'athlétisme, a competition in which he would achieve 19 medals including 13 golds over the next 12 years, Noël was selected for the French Olympic discus team for the 1928 Games in Amsterdam.

Noël won the British AAA Championships titles in the shot put and discus events at the British 1930 AAA Championships.

He went on to break the French discus record in the trials for the 1932 Summer Olympics, throwing 49.44 m. He travelled to the Games in Los Angeles, California and led out the team in the opening ceremony as the French flag bearer. The French team convinced the U.S. officials that wine was an essential part of their competitors' diets, receiving special permission to circumvent the prohibition in force across the country. Noël took full advantage of this and is reported as "swigging champagne with his compatriots" in the locker room between rounds at the discus event. There was then further controversy when Noël finished in fourth place: the officials in charge of the event disallowed a throw that is believed to have been farther than gold medal winner John Anderson's 49.39 m attempt. The throw was not accepted because the officials did not see where it landed, their attention being drawn to the pole vaulting competition instead. Noël was allowed an additional attempt but could not match his earlier performance, reaching 47.74 m and finishing fourth. Anderson went on to improve his distance to 49.49 m, an Olympic record.

Noël went on to compete at the inaugural European Athletics Championships in 1934 in Turin, Italy, finishing seventh in the discus and tenth in the shot put. The 1936 Olympic Games were held in Berlin and Noël was again selected as the flag bearer for his country. Noël returned to European competition at the 1938 Championships in Paris, again finishing seventh in the discus and improving to ninth in the shot put.

=== Death ===
Noël died during World War II from a wound sustained during a battle outside Escaudœuvres near Cambrai.
