= List of career achievements by Michael Johnson =

This page details the career achievements of American track & field athlete Michael Johnson. Over the course of his career, Johnson consistently dominated his events, winning almost every time he took to the track. He set numerous world and Olympic records in short distance track, both as an individual and as a member of relay teams. His domination of the 400 meter race is unprecedented in the history of track and field, making him arguably the greatest 400 m runner of all time. For approximately one decade, Michael Johnson held the world records in the 200 meters, 400 meters and indoor 400 meters, as well as the world's best time in the 300 meters and the world record for the 4 by 400 meter relay. He is still a world record holder for the 4 x 400 meter relay. In 2004, Johnson was voted into the United States Track & Field Hall of Fame. At the ceremony, his record-setting 200-meter performance at the 1996 Summer Olympics was deemed the greatest track and field moment in the past 25 years. Johnson is generally considered one of the greatest and most consistent sprinters in the history of track and field.

== Medal record ==
=== Olympics ===
Games	Event	Times	Result
1992 Barcelona	4 x 400 m relay	2:55.74 (44.73)	Gold
1996 Atlanta	200 m	19.32	Gold
1996 Atlanta	400 m	43.49	Gold
2000 Sydney	400 m	43.84	Gold
2000 Sydney	4 x 400 m relay	2:56.35 (44.29)	Disqualified*
*Teammates Antonio Pettigrew and Jerome Young later admitted to use of performance-enhancing drugs, invalidating this performance and vacating the team of their gold medals.

=== World Championships ===
Games	Event	Time	Result
1991 Tokyo	200 m	20.01	Gold
1993 Stuttgart	400 m	43.65	Gold
1993 Stuttgart	4 x 400 m relay	2:54.29 (42.91)	Gold
1995 Gothenburg	200 m	19.79	Gold
1995 Gothenburg	400 m	43.39	Gold
1995 Gothenburg	4 x 400 m relay	2:57.32 (44.11)	Gold
1997 Athens	400 m	44.12	Gold
1999 Seville	400 m	43.18	Gold

== Awards ==
- World Athletics Awards

World Athlete of the Year (Men)：1996, 1999

- Men's Track & Field Athlete of the Year: 1990, 1996
- Jesse Owens Award: 1994, 1995, 1996
- Associated Press Athlete of the Year: 1996
- Best Male Track Athlete ESPY Award: 1994, 1996, 1997, 2000
- James E. Sullivan Award: 1996
- Jesse Owens International Trophy: 1996, 1997

=== Track & Field News World Rankings ===
Event	1990	1991	1992	1993	1994	1995	1996	1997	1998	1999	2000
200 meters	1	1	3	4	1	1	1	7	NR	2	8
400 meters	1	1	5	1	1	1	1	1	1	1	1

== Personal bests ==
=== 200 meters ===
Track records (11) are highlighted.

Time (sec)	Wind	Result	Date	Venue	Age	Notes
19.32	0.4	1	August 1, 1996	Atlanta, GA, United States	28 years, 323 days	
19.66	1.7	1	June 23, 1996	Atlanta, GA, United States	28 years, 284 days	
19.71A	1.8	1 r1	March 18, 2000	Pietersburg, South Africa	32 years, 187 days	
19.77	0.6	1	July 8, 1996	Stockholm, Sweden	28 years, 299 days	
19.79	1.0	1	June 28, 1992	New Orleans, Louisiana, United States	24 years, 289 days	
19.79	0.5	1	August 11, 1995	Gothenburg, Sweden	27 years, 332 days	
19.83	1.7	1	May 18, 1996	Atlanta, GA, United States	28 years, 248 days	
19.85	0.4	1	July 6, 1990	Edinburgh, Scotland	22 years, 296 days	
19.85	1.1	2	July 5, 1996	Oslo, Norway	28 years, 296 days	
19.88A	1.5	1	August 8, 1990	Sestriere, Italy	22 years, 329 days	
19.88	–0.9	1	September 20, 1991	Barcelona, Spain	24 years, 7 days	
19.89	1.0	1	September 13, 1991	Bruxelles, Belgium	24 years, 0 days	
19.89	0.3	1 h4	July 22, 2000	Sacramento, CA, United States	32 years, 313 days	
19.90	0.3	1	June 16, 1990	Norwalk, CA, United States	22 years, 276 days	1990 USA Outdoor Track and Field Championships
19.91	1.9	1	July 13, 1992	Salamanca, Spain	24 years, 304 days	
19.91	0.0	1 r1	June 9, 2000	Sevilla, Spain	32 years, 270 days	
19.93	–0.3	1	September 9, 1995	Monaco, Monaco	27 years, 361 days	
19.93	0.8	1	July 7, 1999	Roma, Italy	31 years, 297 days	
19.93	0.4	1	September 3, 1999	Bruxelles, Belgium	31 years, 355 days	
19.94	1.4	1	September 15, 1991	Sheffield, England	24 years, 2 days	This time equalled James Sanford's (USA) track record from June 1980 which was set with wind assistance of 4 m/s.
19.94	0.0	1	August 2, 1994	Monaco, Monaco	26 years, 323 days	
19.98	–0.4	1	September 6, 1991	Rieti, Italy	23 years, 358 days	
19.98	0.3	1	May 22, 1992	Houston, TX, United States	24 years, 252 days	
20.01	1.0	1	June 29, 1990	Villeneuve-d'Ascq, France	22 years, 289 days	
20.01	–3.4	1	August 27, 1991	Tokyo, Japan	23 years, 348 days	
20.01	0.3	1 sf1	August 11, 1995	Göteborg, Sweden	27 years, 332 days	

Johnson also holds the track record for Gateshead, United Kingdom where in August 1990 he ran 20.21 seconds with a wind assistance of 2.2 m/s.

=== 400 meters ===
In the history of track, 102 times has a runner run the 400 meters in less than 44 seconds. Johnson alone accounts for 22 of these 102 sub-44 performances (correct as of August 2024).

Track records (11) are highlighted.

Time (sec)	Result	Date	Venue	Age	Notes
43.18	1	August 26, 1999	Seville, Spain	31 years, 347 days	
43.39	1	August 9, 1995	Gothenburg, Sweden	27 years, 330 days	
43.44	1	June 19, 1996	Atlanta, GA, United States	28 years, 280 days	
43.49	1	July 29, 1996	Atlanta, GA, United States	28 years, 320 days	
43.65	1	August 17, 1993	Stuttgart, Germany	25 years, 338 days	
43.66	1	June 16, 1995	Sacramento, CA, United States	27 years, 276 days	
43.66	1 r1	July 3, 1996	Lausanne, Switzerland	28 years, 294 days	
43.68	1	August 12, 1998	Zürich, Switzerland	30 years, 333 days	
43.68	1	July 16, 2000	Sacramento, CA, United States	32 years, 307 days	
43.74	1	June 19, 1993	Eugene, OR, United States	25 years, 279 days	
43.75	1	April 19, 1997	Waco, TX, United States	29 years, 218 days	
43.76	1	July 21, 1998	Uniondale, NY, United States	30 years, 311 days	
43.84	1	September 25, 2000	Sydney, Australia	33 years, 12 days	
43.86	1	July 21, 1995	Oslo, Norway	27 years, 311 days	
43.88	1	August 16, 1995	Zürich, Switzerland	27 years, 337 days	
43.90	1	September 6, 1994	Madrid, Spain	26 years, 358 days	
43.92	1 r2	July 2, 1999	Lausanne, Switzerland	31 years, 292 days	
43.92	1	June 24, 2000	Eugene, OR, United States	32 years, 285 days	
43.94	1	August 27, 1993	Berlin, Germany	25 years, 348 days	
43.95	1 sf1	August 24, 1999	Seville, Spain	31 years, 345 days	
43.96	1	August 8, 1998	Monaco, Monaco	30 years, 329 days	
43.98	1 r1	July 10, 1992	London, England	24 years, 301 days	
44.04	1	August 30, 1994	Berlin, Germany	26 years, 351 days	
44.06	1	August 28, 1998	Brussels, Belgium	30 years, 349 days	
44.07	1	August 25, 2000	Brussels, Belgium	32 years, 347 days	
44.12	1	August 5, 1997	Athens, Greece	29 years, 326 days	
44.17	1 r1	July 10, 1991	Lausanne, Switzerland	23 years, 300 days	

=== Indoor 400 meters ===
Time (sec)	Result	Date	Venue	Age	Notes
44.63	1	March 4, 1995	Atlanta, GA, United States	27 years, 172 days	1995 USA Indoor Track and Field Championships
44.66	1	March 2, 1996	Atlanta, GA, United States	28 years, 171 days	
44.97A	1	February 10, 1995	Reno, NV, United States	27 years, 150 days	First athlete to break 45 seconds
45.14	1	February 20, 1993	Birmingham, England	25 years, 160 days	
45.17	1	February 26, 1994	Birmingham, England	26 years, 166 days	
45.32	1	February 24, 1996	Fairfax, VA, United States	28 years, 164 days	
45.46	1 r1	February 28, 1991	Sevilla, Spain	23 years, 168 days	
45.55	1	February 25, 1995	Fairfax, VA, United States	27 years, 165 days	

=== 100 meters ===
Time (sec)	Wind	Result	Date	Venue	Age
10.09	2.0	2 h3	June 15, 1994	Knoxville, TN, United States	26 years, 275 days

=== 300 meters ===
Both of these times are track records.

Time (sec)	Result	Date	Venue	Age
30.85	1	March 24, 2000	Pretoria, South Africa	32 years, 193 days
31.56	1	July 22, 1994	Salamanca, Spain	26 years, 312 days

=== 4 by 200 meters relay ===
Time (sec)	Result	Date	Venue	Age	Team	Legs
1:19.47	1	April 24, 1999	Philadelphia, PA, United States	31 years, 223 days	Nike	Kenny Brokenburr, Alvin Harrison, Maurice Greene, Michael Johnson

=== 4 by 400 meters relay ===
Track records are highlighted.

Time (sec)	Result	Date	Venue	Age	Team	Legs	Notes
2:54.29 (42.91)	1	August 22, 1993	Stuttgart, Germany	25 years, 343 days	United States	Andrew Valmon, Quincy Watts, Butch Reynolds, Michael Johnson	1993 World Championships Final. Fastest relay leg in history.
2:55.74 (44.73)	1	August 8, 1992	Barcelona, Spain	24 years, 330 days	United States	Andrew Valmon, Quincy Watts, Michael Johnson, Steve Lewis	1992 Summer Olympics Final
2:57.32 (44.11)	1	August 13, 1995	Göteborg, Sweden	27 years, 334 days	United States	Marlon Ramsey, Derek Mills, Butch Reynolds, Michael Johnson	1995 World Championships Final
2:58.72	1 sf2	August 21, 1993	Stuttgart, Germany	25 years, 342 days	United States	Andrew Valmon, Antonio Pettigrew, Derek Mills, Michael Johnson	1993 World Championships Qualifying Heat 2

== Records ==
=== World records ===
Event	Time	Date	Venue	Surpassed by
200 meters	19.32	August 1, 1996	Atlanta, GA, USA	Usain Bolt (19.19, Berlin, Germany, August 20, 2009)
300 meters	30.85	March 24, 2000	Pretoria, South Africa	Wayde van Niekerk (30.81, Ostrava, Czech Republic, June 28, 2017)
400 meters	43.18	August 26, 1999	Sevilla, Spain	Wayde van Niekerk (43.03, Rio de Janeiro, Brazil, August 14, 2016)
400 meters (indoor)	44.63	March 4, 1995	Atlanta, GA, United States	Kerron Clement (44.57, Fayetteville, AR, United States, March 12, 2005)
4 x 400 meter relay	2:54.29 (42.91)	August 22, 1993	Stuttgart, Germany	UNBROKEN
4 by 400 meter U.S. relay team consisted of Andrew Valmon, Quincy Watts, Butch Reynolds and Michael Johnson. Johnson ran the anchor leg in 42.91 seconds, which is the fastest 400 meters ever run by a human.

Fastest 4 x 400 meter relay leg in history: 42.91, fourth leg, United States relay team, August 22, 1993, Stuttgart, Germany

- 1993 IAAF World Championships Final (gold)
- Other than Jeremy Wariner (USA) who ran a 42.93 split in the 2007 Osaka World Championship final, no one else has ever broken 43 seconds.
- The 4 x 400 m U.S. relay team also set a world record with a time of 2:54.29. Both records still stand.

Consecutive 400 meter finals won: 58

- Johnson's eight-year winning streak in the 400 m was snapped when he finished fifth in Paris in June 1997. Antonio Pettigrew won the race.

Largest margin of victory in the 200 meters in 55 years (1991 World Championships)

- Johnson ran a Championship record 20.01, .33 seconds ahead of Frankie Fredericks.
- Largest margin of victory in 200 m since Jesse Owens ran a world record 20.7, .4 seconds ahead of Mack Robinson, in the 1936 Olympics

Largest margin of victory in the 200 meters in history (1996 Olympics)

- Johnson ran a world record 19.32, .36 seconds ahead of Frankie Fredericks.
- Tied with Jesse Owens
- Broken by Usain Bolt

Largest improvement ever on a 200 m world record: .34 seconds

- Johnson broke his own record

Largest margin of victory in the 400 meters in history (1999 World Championships)

- Johnson ran a world record 43.18, finishing an incredible 1.11 seconds ahead of second-place Sanderlei Claro Parrela of Brazil.

Only athlete to be ranked #1 in the world in both 200 meters and 400 meters in the same year

- Five different years (1990, 1991, 1994, 1995, 1996)

First athlete to break 20 seconds in 200 meters and 44 seconds in 400 meters in a career

- Also achieved by LaShawn Merritt, the second athlete to do so, Isaac Makwala, the third, and Wayde van Niekerk, the fourth athlete.

Only athlete to break 20 seconds in 200 meters and 44 seconds in 400 meters at the same meet

- He first achieved this at the 1995 U.S. National Championships.

First athlete to break 45 seconds in indoor 400 meters: 44.97, February 10, 1995, Reno, NV, United States

Most gold medals won on the track: Twelve (4 Olympics, 8 World Championships)

- Carl Lewis won more gold medals in track & field, but not more on the track. Usain Bolt has broken this record, surpassing both Johnson and Lewis in the gold medal count on the track.

First athlete to win both 200 meters and 400 meters at U.S. National Championships (1995)

=== Olympic records ===
Event	Time	Date	Venue	Surpassed by
200 meters	19.32	August 1, 1996	Atlanta, GA, United States	Usain Bolt (19.30, Beijing, China, August 20, 2008)
400 meters	43.49	July 29, 1996	Atlanta, GA, United States	Wayde van Niekerk (43.03, Rio de Janeiro, Brazil, August 14, 2016)
4 x 400 meter relay	2:55.74 (44.73)	August 8, 1992	Barcelona, Spain	United States (2:55.39, Beijing, China, August 23, 2008)
1992 4 by 400 meter U.S. relay team consisted of Andrew Valmon, Quincy Watts, Michael Johnson and Steve Lewis. Johnson ran the third leg in 44.73 seconds.
2008 4 by 400 meter U.S. relay team consisted of LaShawn Merritt, Angelo Taylor, David Neville and Jeremy Wariner.

Only man to win 200 meters and 400 meters at the same Olympics (1996 Atlanta)

Only man to repeat as Olympic champion in 400 meters (1996 Atlanta, 2000 Sydney)

=== IAAF World Championships records ===
Event	Time	Date	Venue	Surpassed by
200 meters	19.79	August 11, 1995	Gothenburg, Sweden	Usain Bolt (19.19 seconds)
400 meters	43.18	August 26, 1999	Sevilla, Spain	Never been surpassed
4 x 400 meter relay	2:54.29 (42.91)	August 22, 1993	Stuttgart, Germany	Never been surpassed
4 by 400 meter U.S. relay team consisted of Andrew Valmon, Quincy Watts, Butch Reynolds and Michael Johnson. Johnson ran the anchor leg in 42.91 seconds, which is the fastest 400 meters ever run by a human.

Fastest 4 x 400 meter relay leg in World Championships history: 42.91, fourth leg, United States relay team, August 22, 1993, Stuttgart, Germany

- 1993 IAAF World Championships Final (gold)
- No one else has ever broken 43 seconds.
- The 4 x 400 m U.S. relay team also set a world record with a time of 2:54.29. Both records still stand.

Only athlete to win the 200 meters and 400 meters at the World Championships in a career (1991 Tokyo, 1993 Stuttgart)

Only athlete to win the 200 meters and 400 meters at the same World Championships (1995 Gothenburg)

- This required running nine races in nine days.

Most gold medals won in World Championships history: Eight

- Tied with Carl Lewis
- Broken by Usain Bolt

== Achievements ==
Year	Meeting	Venue	Result	Event	Time
1989	USA Indoor Championships		2nd	Indoor 400 m	
1989	NCAA Indoor Championships		1st	Indoor 200 m	20.59 AR
1990	?	Edinburgh, United Kingdom	1st	200 m	19.85 AC
1990	USA Indoor Championships		1st	Indoor 400 m	47.43
1990	USA Indoor Championships		1st	Indoor 200 m	20.72
1990	USA Outdoors Championships	Norwalk	1st	200 m	19.90
1990	NCAA Outdoors Championships	Durham	1st	200 m	20.31
1990	Goodwill Games	Seattle, United States	1st	200 m	
1991	IAAF World Championships	Tokyo, Japan	1st	200 m	20.01
1991	USA Indoor Championships		1st	Indoor 400 m	46.70
1991	USA Outdoors Championships	New York City, United States	1st	200 m	20.31
1991	IAAF / Mobil Grand Prix Final	Barcelona, Spain	1st	200 m	19.88
1992	U.S. Olympic Trials	New Orleans, United States	1st	200 m	19.79
1992	Crystal Palace	London, United Kingdom	1st	400 m	43.98 AC
1992	1992 Summer Olympics	Barcelona, Spain	1st	4 x 400 m Relay	2:55.74 (3rd leg, 44.73)
1993	IAAF World Championships	Stuttgart, Germany	1st	4 x 400 m Relay	2:54.29 (4th leg, 42.91)
1993	IAAF World Championships	Stuttgart, Germany	1st	400 m	43.65 AC
1993	USA Outdoors Championships	Eugene, United States	1st	400 m	43.74
1993	IAAF / Mobil Grand Prix Final	London, United Kingdom	3rd	200 m	
1994	Goodwill Games	St. Petersburg, Russia	1st	200 m	20.10 AC
1995	IAAF World Championships	Gothenburg, Sweden	1st	4 x 400 m Relay	2:57.32 AC (4th leg, 44.11)
1995	IAAF World Championships	Gothenburg, Sweden	1st	200 m	19.79
1995	IAAF World Championships	Gothenburg, Sweden	1st	400 m	43.39 AC
1995	?	Reno, United States	1st	Indoor 400 m	44.97
1995	USA Indoor Championships	Atlanta, Georgia	1st	Indoor 400 m	44.63
1995	USA Outdoors Championships		1st	200 m	19.83
1995	USA Outdoors Championships	Sacramento, United States	1st	400 m	43.66
1995	IAAF / Mobil Grand Prix Final	Monaco	1st	200 m	19.93
1996	Atlanta Grand Prix Final	Atlanta, United States	1st	200 m	19.83
1996	U.S. Olympic trials	Atlanta, United States	1st	400 m	43.44 US
1996	U.S. Olympic trials	Atlanta, United States	1st	200 m	19.66
1996	1996 Summer Olympics	Atlanta, United States	1st	400 m	43.49
1996	1996 Summer Olympics	Atlanta, United States	1st	200 m	19.32
1996	USA Indoor Championships		1st	Indoor 400 m	44.66
1996	IAAF / Mobil Grand Prix Final		1st	400 m	
1997	IAAF World Championships	Athens, Greece	1st	400 m	44.12
1998	Goodwill Games	New York City, United States	1st	400 m	43.76
1998		Oslo, Norway	3rd	400 m	44.58
1999	IAAF World Championships	Seville, Spain	1st	4 x 400 m Relay	2:56.47 AC
1999	IAAF World Championships	Seville, Spain	1st	400 m	43.18
2000		Pietersburg, South Africa	1st	200 m	19.71 AC
2000		Pretoria, South Africa	1st	300 m	30.85 WB
2000		South Africa	1st	400 m	43.9
2000	U.S. Olympic Trials	Sacramento, United States	1st	400 m	43.68
2000	2000 Summer Olympics	Sydney, Australia	1st	400 m	43.84

- AR - American record
- AC - All-comers record; fastest time ever run on host nation's soil
- US - Fastest time ever run on United States soil
