= 1933 USA Outdoor Track and Field Championships =

American athletics championship event

- Dates: 30 June-1 July (men); 30 June (women)
- Host city: Chicago, Illinois
- Venue: Northwestern Stadium (men); Soldier Field (women)
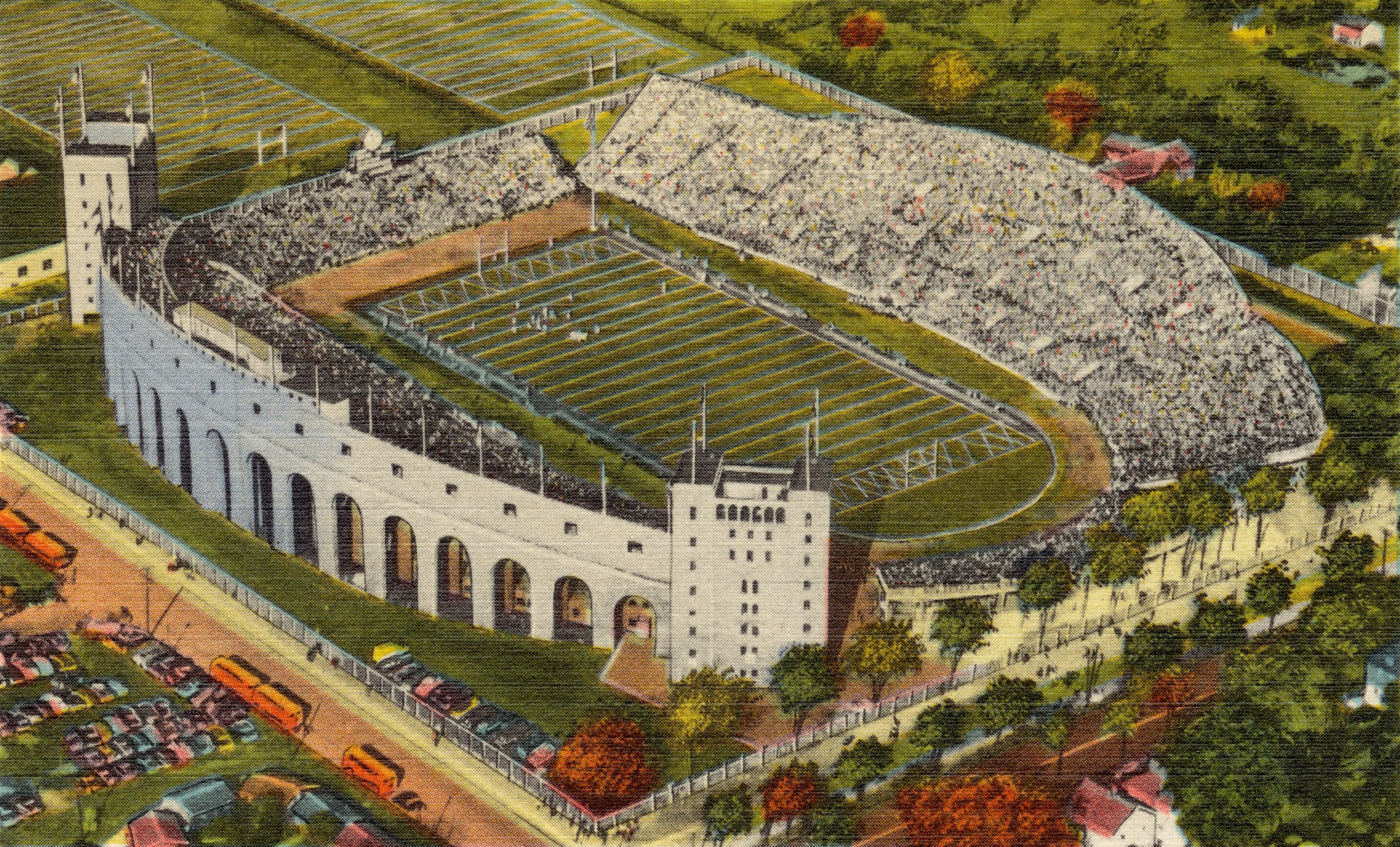

The 1933 USA Outdoor Track and Field Championships were organized by the Amateur Athletic Union (AAU) and served as the national championships in outdoor track and field for the United States.

The men's edition was held at Northwestern Stadium in Chicago, Illinois, and it took place 30 June-1 July. The women's meet was also held in Chicago, but at Soldier Field on 30 June. Aside from the 1926 USA Outdoor Track and Field Championships, it was the only time the men's and women's championships were held in the same city until 1976.

At the men's championships, world records were set in the 110 m hurdles by John Morriss and in the 200 m hurdles by Heye Lambertus. In the women's competition, Louise Stokes became the first Black American woman to win the championships, taking first place in the 50 m.

== Results ==
=== Men ===
| Event | Gold | | Silver | | Bronze | |
|---|---|---|---|---|---|---|
| 100 m | Ralph Metcalfe | 10.5 | James Johnson | | Jesse Owens | |
| 200 m | Ralph Metcalfe | 21.1 | James Johnson | | Paul Starr | |
| 400 m | Ivan Fuqua | 47.7 | Karl Warner | | Howard Jones | |
| 800 m | Glenn Cunningham | 1:51.8 | Charles Hornbostel | | John Simmons | |
| 1500 m | Glenn Cunningham | 3:52.3 | Joseph Mangan | 3:55.0 | Gene Venzke | 3:56.3 |
| 5000 m | John Follows | 15:27.0 | Paul Rekers | | John Ryan | |
| 10,000 m | Lou Gregory | 32:39.4 | Thomas McDonough | | Eino Pentti | |
| Marathon | David Komonen (CAN) | 2:53:43.0 | Melvin Porter | 2:53:49.0 | Fred Ward | 2:57:15.0 |
| 110 m hurdles | John Morriss | 14.6 | Percy Beard | | Alvin Moreau | |
| 400 m hurdles | Glenn Hardin | 52.2 | Joseph Healey | | Richard Pomeroy | |
| 3000 m steeplechase | Joseph McCluskey | 9:38.5 | Forrest Harvey | | Joe Sears | |
| High jump | Cornelius Johnson | 2.00 m | George Spitz | 1.95 m | none awarded | |
| High jump | Cornelius Johnson | 2.00 m | Walter Marty | 1.95 m | none awarded | |
| Pole vault | Keith Brown | 4.27 m | none awarded | | John Wonsowitz | 4.21 m |
| Pole vault | Matthew Gordy | 4.27 m | none awarded | | John Wonsowitz | 4.21 m |
| Long jump | Jesse Owens | 7.48 m | John Brooks | 7.46 m | Everett Utterback | 7.27 m |
| Triple jump | Nathan Blair | 14.40 m | Ennis Stafford | 14.22 m | Rolland Romero | 14.15 m |
| Shot put | Jack Torrance | 15.65 m | Gordon Dunn | 15.47 m | John Lyman | 15.37 m |
| Discus throw | John Anderson | 50.33 m | Robert Jones | 50.07 m | Henri LaBorde | 49.04 m |
| Hammer throw | Patrick O'Callaghan (IRL) | 49.16 m | Chester Cruikshank | 48.93 m | Noble Biddinger | 48.59 m |
| Javelin throw | Lee Bartlett | 63.85 m | Warren Demaris | 61.95 m | Horace O'Dell | 60.98 m |
| Decathlon | Bernard Berlinger | 7957.190 pts | Richard Baldry | 7419.400 pts | Raymond Patterson | 7370.350 pts |
| 200 m hurdles | Heye Lambertus | 23.5 | | | | |
| Pentathlon | Eulace Peacock | 3221 pts | | | | |
| Weight throw for distance | Pat McDonald | 10.68 m | | | | |

=== Women ===
| Event | Gold | | Silver | Bronze |
|---|---|---|---|---|
| 50 m | Louise Stokes | 6.6 | Wilhelmina Von Bremen | Ethel Harrington |
| 100 m | Annette Rogers | 12.2 | Louise Stokes | Harriet Bland |
| 200 m | Olive Hasenfus | 26.2 | Elizabeth Wilde | Lois Collar |
| 80 m hurdles | Simone Schaller | 12.1 | Lois Collar | Roxanne Atkins (CAN) |
| High jump | Alice Arden | 1.60 m | Genevieve Valvoda | Annette Rogers |
| Long jump | Genevieve Valvoda | 5.25 m | Nellie Todd | Mildred Schworm |
| Shot put | Catherine Rutherford | 11.86 m | Rena McDonald | Evelyn Ferrara |
| Discus throw | Ruth Osborn | 37.49 m | Catherine Rutherford | Wilhelmina Von Bremen |
| Javelin throw | Nan Gindele | 39.68 m | Sue Daugherty | Evelyn Ferrara |
| Baseball throw | Catherine Rutherford | 232 ft 2 in (70.76 m) | | |

== See also ==
- List of USA Outdoor Track and Field Championships winners (men)
- List of USA Outdoor Track and Field Championships winners (women)
