= 1935 USA Outdoor Track and Field Championships =

American athletics championship event

- Dates: 3–4 July (men); 14 September (women)
- Host city: Lincoln, Nebraska (men); The Bronx, New York (women)
- Venue: Memorial Stadium (men); Ohio Field (women)
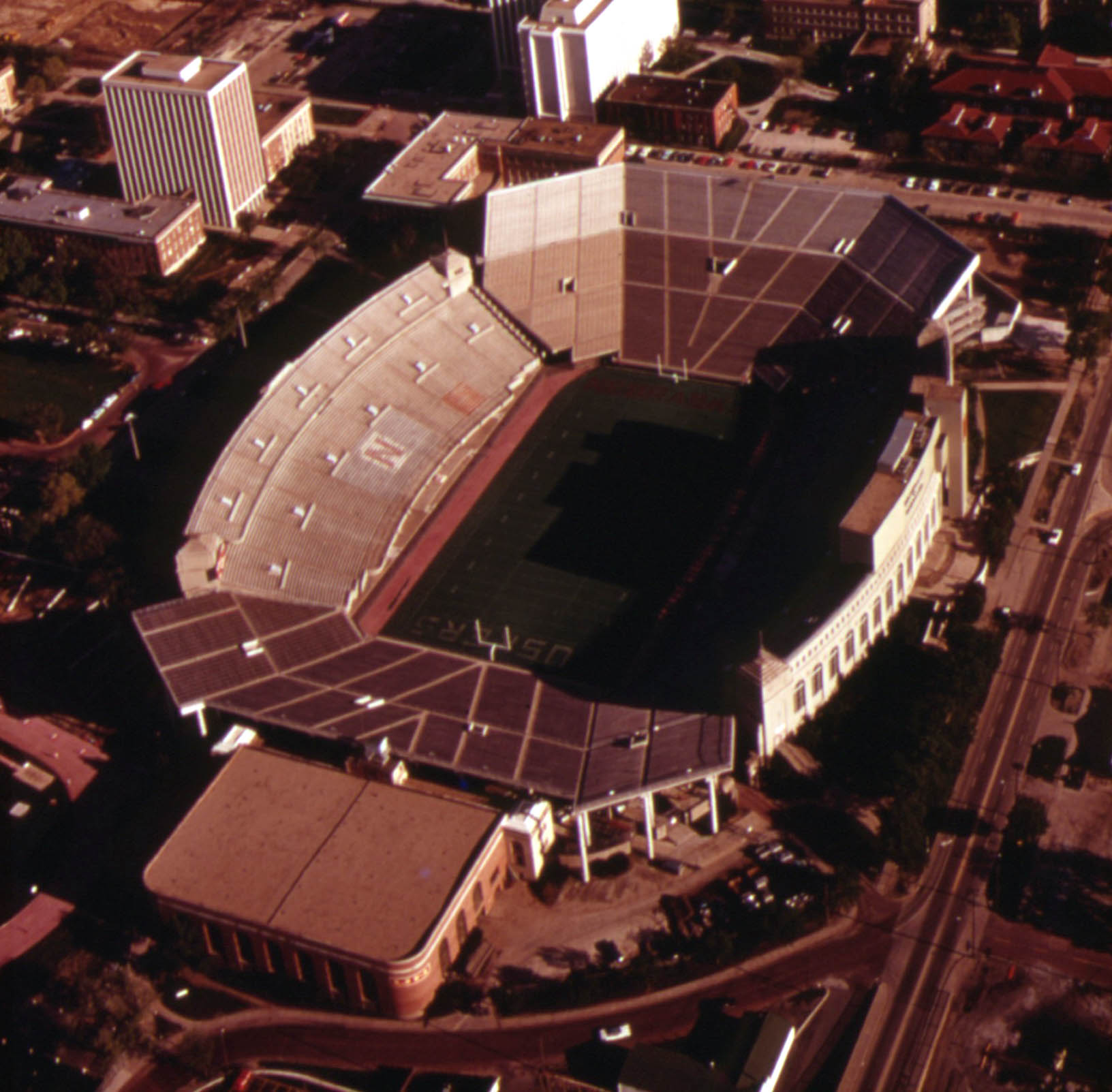

The 1935 USA Outdoor Track and Field Championships were organized by the Amateur Athletic Union (AAU) and served as the national championships in outdoor track and field for the United States.

The men's edition was held at Memorial Stadium in Lincoln, Nebraska, and it took place 3–4 July. The women's meet was held separately at Ohio Field in The Bronx, New York, on 14 September.

At the men's championships, times were run in the 100 m and 110 m hurdles that were faster than the then-world records, but tailwinds were too strong for the marks to count. It was the first time the women's competition was held in New York City, which was marked by the national debut of Helen Stephens.

== Results ==
=== Men ===
Event	Gold		Silver		Bronze	
100 m	Eulace Peacock	10.2 w	Ralph Metcalfe	10.3 e w	Jesse Owens	10.3 e w
220 yards straight (Note: Race was held on a slight turn)	Ralph Metcalfe	21.0 w	Foy Draper		none awarded	
220 yards straight	Ralph Metcalfe	21.0 w	George Anderson		none awarded	
400 m	Edward O'Brien	47.6	Ivan Fuqua		Albert Fitch	
800 m	Elroy Robinson	1:53.1	John Wolff		Waldo Sweet	
1500 m	Glenn Cunningham	3:52.1	Gene Venzke	3:54.8	Archie San Romani	
5000 m	Joseph McCluskey	15:14.1	Norman Bright		William Zepp	
10,000 m	Thomas Ottey	32:07.3	Eino Pentti		Thomas McDonough	
Marathon	Pat Dengis	2:53:53.0	Hugo Kauppinen	2:55:27.0	Melvin Porter	2:59:24.0
110 m hurdles	Percy Beard	14.2 w	Leroy Kirkpatrick		Alvin Moreau	
400 m hurdles	Tom Moore	53.5	Estel Johnston		Glenn Morris	
3000 m steeplechase	Joseph McCluskey	9:30.6	Harold Manning		Frank Nordell	
High jump	Cornelius Johnson	2.00 m	George Spitz	1.98 m	Knewell Rushforth	1.93 m
Pole vault	Earle Meadows	4.23 m	none awarded		William Roy	4.15 m
Pole vault	William Sefton	4.23 m	none awarded		Jack Mauger	4.15 m
Long jump	Eulace Peacock	8.00 m	Jesse Owens	7.98 m	John Brooks	7.76 m
Triple jump	Rolland Romero	15.35 m	Solomon Furth	14.77 m	none awarded	
Triple jump	Rolland Romero	15.35 m	Stanley Johnson	14.77 m	none awarded	
Shot put	Jack Torrance	15.70 m	Gordon Dunn	15.57 m	John Lyman	15.37 m
Discus throw	Ken Carpenter	48.45 m	Gordon Dunn	47.24 m	Hugh Cannon	47.09 m
Hammer throw	Henry Dreyer	51.42 m	Chester Cruikshank	50.46 m	Gantt Miller	49.16 m
Javelin throw	Horace O'Dell	66.18 m	Mark Panther	63.11 m	Lee Bartlett	61.89 m
Decathlon	Robert Clark	7929.22 pts	George Mackey	7745.77 pts	Runar Stone	7700.41 pts
200 m hurdles	Dale Schofield	23.2				
3000 m walk	Harry Hinkel	13:43.3				
Pentathlon	Clyde Coffman	3084 pts				
Weight throw for distance	Clark Haskins	10.52 m				

=== Women ===
Event	Gold		Silver		Bronze	
50 m	Louise Stokes	6.7	Miriam Nelson		Charlotte Rafferty	
100 m	Helen Stephens	11.6	May Brady		Harriet Bland	
200 m	Helen Stephens	24.6	Olive Hasenfus		Harriet Bland	
80 m hurdles	Jean Hiller	13.0	Jane Santschi		Anna Lebo	
High jump	Barbara Howe	1.50 m	Ruth Timmerman	1.47 m	Dorothy Davis	1.40 m
High jump	Barbara Howe	1.50 m	Ruth Timmerman	1.47 m	Ruth Reilly	1.40 m
Long jump	Etta Tate	5.03 m	Dorothy Ott	4.84 m	Sylvia Broman	4.82 m
Shot put (8 lb)	Rena McDonald	11.68 m	Effy Storz	10.48 m	Evelyn Ferrara	10.39 m
Discus throw	Margaret Wright	34.68 m	Helen Stephens	34.00 m	Evelyn Ferrara	33.72 m
Javelin throw	Sylvia Broman	31.28 m	Rose Auerbach	31.25 m	Evelyn Ferrara	29.86 m
Baseball throw	Carolyn Dieckman	223 ft 6 in (68.12 m)				

== See also ==
- List of USA Outdoor Track and Field Championships winners (men)
- List of USA Outdoor Track and Field Championships winners (women)
