= Jesse Owens International Trophy =

Annual sports award

The Jesse Owens International Trophy is an annual sports award that is given out by the International Athletic Association (IAA), (Note: The IAA is often confused with the IAAF (now known as World Athletics), but the two organizations are distinct.) named after Olympic sprinter Jesse Owens. It has been awarded annually since 1981, with the exception of a ten-year break from 2004 to 2014. In 2002 and 2003, it was briefly renamed "American-International Athlete Trophy" before it returned to its original name.

The award was created and promoted by Herb Douglas, American long jumper and Olympic silver medalist in 1948. Douglas was inspired by Jesse Owens and founded the IAA. After the pause due to Douglas' old age, former Penn Quakers football player Wesley E. Smith became chairman of the International Athletic Association and rebooted the award.

There is a separate and unrelated annual track and field award called the Jesse Owens Award given out by USA Track & Field since 1981.

== Criteria ==
The award is presented to "that amateur athlete who, in the opinion of an international blue-ribbon panel of sports experts, best personifies those qualities of that great Olympian after whom it is named. Those qualities are excellence in athletic accomplishment and performance, a high standard of sportsmanship, and a sincere commitment to cooperation among peoples of all nations". In 2016, the winner was selected by polling the Association Internationale de la Presse Sportive (AIPS), an international organization of sports journalists.

== List of recipients ==
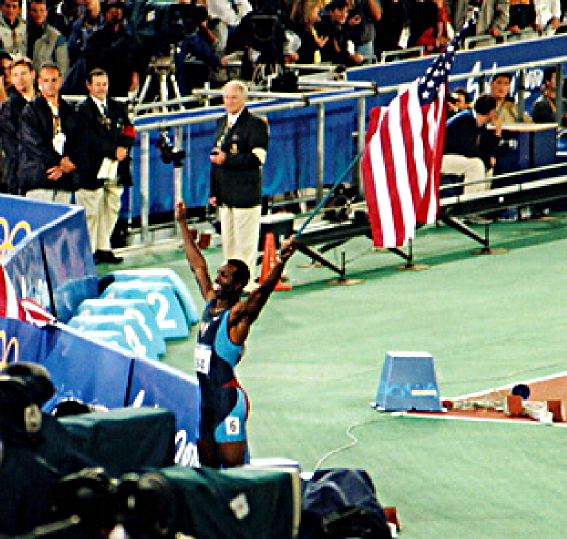
Michael Johnson won the award in 1996 and 1997.

Year	Winner	Nationality	Sport	R.
1981	Eric Heiden	United States	Long-track speed skating	
1982	Sebastian Coe	Great Britain	Athletics	
1983	Mary Decker	United States	Athletics	
1984	Edwin Moses	United States	Athletics	
1985	Carl Lewis	United States	Athletics	
1986	Said Aouita	Morocco	Athletics	
1987	Greg Louganis	United States	Diving	
1988	Ben Johnson	Canada	Athletics	
1989	Florence Griffith-Joyner	United States	Athletics	
1990	Roger Kingdom	United States	Athletics	
1991	Greg LeMond	United States	Road bicycle racing	
1992	Mike Powell	United States	Athletics	
1993	Vitaly Scherbo	Belarus	Artistic gymnastics	
1994	Wang Junxia	China	Athletics	
1995	Johann Olav Koss	Norway	Speed skating	
1996	Michael Johnson	United States	Athletics	
1997	Michael Johnson	United States	Athletics	
1998	Haile Gebrselassie	Ethiopia	Athletics	
1999	Marion Jones	United States	Athletics	
2000	Lance Armstrong	United States	Road bicycle racing	
2001	Marion Jones	United States	Athletics	
2002	Ian Thorpe	Australia	Swimming	
2003	Lance Armstrong	United States	Road bicycle racing	
Not awarded from 2004 to 2013
2014	Usain Bolt	Jamaica	Athletics	
2017	Serena Williams (Note: The award winners were originally announced for an October 2016 gala, but it was later postponed to April 2017. A separate "Jesse Owens Award for Global Peace" was given to American boxer Muhummad Ali.)	United States	Tennis	
