= Jesse Owens =

American track and field athlete (1913–1980)

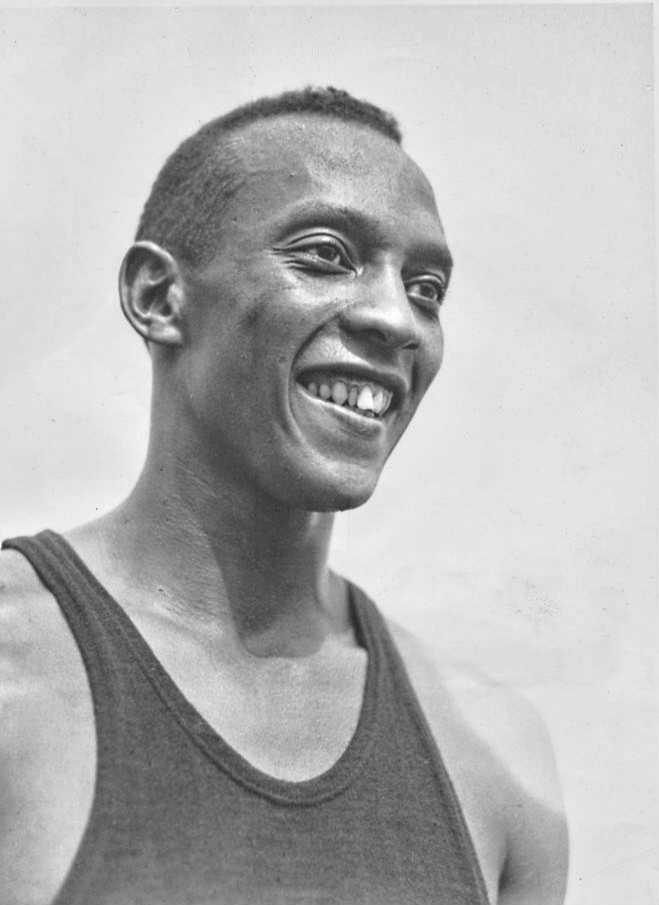
- Owens at the 1936 Summer Olympics, where he won four Olympic gold medals

Personal information
- Nickname: The Buckeye Bullet
- Born: James Cleveland Owens; September 12, 1913 Oakville, Alabama, U.S.
- Died: March 31, 1980 (aged 66) Tucson, Arizona, U.S.
- Resting place: Oak Woods Cemetery
- Height: 5 ft 11 in (180 cm)
- Weight: 165 lb (75 kg)
- Spouse: M. Ruth Solomon (m. 1935)

Sport
- Sport: Track and field
- Events: Sprint, Long jump

Achievements and titles
- National finals: 1933 USA Champs; • 100m, 3rd (bronze); • Long jump, 1st (gold); 1934 USA Indoors; • Long jump, 1st (gold); 1934 USA Champs; • 100m, 2nd (silver); • Long jump, 1st (gold); 1935 USA Indoors; • 60m, 2nd (silver); • Long jump, 1st (gold); 1935 NCAAs; • 100yd, 1st (gold); • 220yd, 1st (gold); • 220yd hurdles, 1st (gold); • Long jump, 1st (gold); 1935 USA Champs; • 100m, 3rd (bronze); • Long jump, 2nd (silver); 1936 NCAAs; • 100m, 1st (gold); • 200m, 1st (gold); • 220yd hurdles, 1st (gold); • Long jump, 1st (gold); 1936 USA Champs; • 100m, 1st (gold); • Long jump, 1st (gold)
- Personal bests: 60 yd: 6.09 (Note: According to his coach Larry Snyder, in preparation for the 1936 Big Ten Championships, Owens ran two 60-yard dashes in six seconds flat.) (1935); 100 yd: 9.3w (1936); 100 m: 10.2 (1936); 200 m: 20.7 (1936); 220 yd: 20.3 (1935); Long jump: 8.13 m (1935)
Medal record
Men's athletics
Representing the United States
Olympic Games
| Gold medal – first place | 1936 Berlin | 100 m |
| Gold medal – first place | 1936 Berlin | 200 m |
| Gold medal – first place | 1936 Berlin | 4 × 100 m relay |
| Gold medal – first place | 1936 Berlin | Long jump |

James Cleveland "Jesse" Owens (September 12, 1913 – March 31, 1980) was an American track and field athlete. He made history at the 1936 Olympic Games by winning four gold medals, setting individual Olympic records in each event, plus another as a member of the 400-meter relay. He is widely regarded as one of the greatest athletes in track and field history.

Owens excelled in short sprints and the long jump and was lauded in his lifetime as "perhaps the greatest and most famous athlete in track and field history". Earlier he won four events, set five world records, and tied another—all in less than an hour, at the 1935 Big Ten Championships in Ann Arbor, Michigan, a feat that has never been equaled and was called "the greatest 45 minutes ever in sport". He won four NCAA titles in both 1935 and 1936, bringing his total to eight—an unparalleled achievement still unmatched.

He achieved international fame at the 1936 Summer Olympics in Berlin, Germany, by winning four gold medals: 100 meters, long jump, 200 meters, and 4 × 100-meter relay. He was the most successful athlete at the Games and, as a black American man, was credited by ESPN with "single-handedly crushing Hitler's myth of Aryan supremacy".

The Jesse Owens Award is USA Track & Field's accolade for the year's best track and field athlete. In a 1950 Associated Press poll, Owens was voted the greatest track and field athlete for the first half of the century. In 1999, he made the six-man short-list for the BBC's Sports Personality of the Century. That same year, ESPN ranked him sixth-greatest North American athlete of the twentieth century and the highest-ranked in his sport.

== Early life ==
Jesse Owens, originally known as J. C., was born on September 12, 1913. He was the youngest of ten children (three girls and seven boys) born to Henry Cleveland Owens (1881–1942), a sharecropper, and Mary Emma Fitzgerald (1876–1940) in Oakville, Alabama. He was the grandson of a slave. At age nine, he and his family moved to Cleveland, Ohio for better opportunities as part of the Great Migration (1910–70) when millions of African Americans left the segregated and rural South for the urban and industrial North. When his new teacher asked his name to enter in her roll book, he said "J. C.", but because of his strong Southern accent, she thought he said "Jesse". The name stuck, and he was known as Jesse Owens thereafter.

In his younger years, Owens took menial jobs in his spare time: he delivered groceries, loaded freight cars, and worked in a shoe repair shop while his father and older brother worked at a steel mill. During this period, Owens developed a passion for running. Throughout his life, Owens attributed the success of his athletic career to the encouragement of Charles Riley, his track coach at Fairmount Junior High School. Since Owens worked after class, Riley allowed him to practice before school instead.

Owens and Minnie Ruth Solomon (1915–2001) met at Fairmont Junior High School in Cleveland when he was 15 and she was 13. They dated steadily through high school. Ruth gave birth to their first daughter, Gloria, in 1932. They married on July 5, 1935, and had two more daughters together: Marlene (1937), and Beverly (1940). They remained married until his death in 1980.

Owens gained national attention as a student of East Technical High School in Cleveland; he equaled the world record of 9.4 seconds in the 100-yard (91 m) dash, broke the national high school record with 20.7 seconds in the 220-yard (200 m) dash, and long-jumped 24 feet 9 1/2 inches (7.56 m) at the 1933 National High School Championship in Chicago. His 100-yard dash remained the national high school record until 1967, while his 200-yard dash remained the national record for 20 years.

== Career ==
=== Ohio State University ===
Owens entered Ohio State University in 1933 after his father found employment, which supported the family. Affectionately known as the "Buckeye Bullet" and under the coaching of Larry Snyder, Owens won a record eight individual NCAA championships, four each in 1935 and 1936. His career total of eight individual NCAA titles remains the most, despite only two years of varsity competition—which included an undefeated junior year in 1936 where he won all 42 events he entered. Though Owens enjoyed athletic success, he was forced to live off campus with other African-American athletes. When he traveled with the team, Owens was restricted to ordering carry-out or eating at "blacks-only" restaurants and had to stay at "blacks-only" hotels. Owens did not receive a scholarship, so he continued to work part-time jobs to pay for school. Owens struggled as a student at Ohio State, and was placed on academic probation in 1936 and 1940. He dropped out in 1941 without earning a degree.

Day of days

On May 25, 1935, Owens won four events and established six world records in athletics at the Big Ten Championships. On that day, Owens battled through a lower back injury, set five world records, and tied a sixth in 45 minutes from 3:15–4 p.m. during the Big Ten meet at Ferry Field in Ann Arbor, Michigan. He equaled the world record for the 100-yard dash (9.4 seconds), and set world records in the long jump (26 feet 8 1/4 inches or 8.13 metres, a world record that lasted for 25 years); 220-yard (201.2 m) sprint (20.3 seconds); and 220-yard low hurdles (22.6 seconds, the first to break 23 seconds). Both 220-yard records had smashed the metric records for 200 meters (flat and hurdles), which counted as two additional world records from the same performances.

1936 Big Ten Championships

At the 1936 Big Ten Championships, Owens dominated, winning the long jump, 100-yard dash, 220-yard dash, and 100-yard low hurdles. With these victories, he concluded his Big Ten Championship career undefeated—winning nine titles in nine events. (Note: In addition to winning four titles apiece in both the 1935 and 1936 Big Ten Outdoor Championships, Owens finished first in the 60-yard dash at the 1935 Big Ten Indoor Championships.)

=== USA Track and Field Championships ===
At the 1934 USA Indoor Track and Field Championships, Owens captured the long jump gold with a world-record leap of 25 ft 3 1/8 in (7.699 m). Two years later, at his final appearance at the Outdoor Championships in 1936, he again shattered the long jump world record with a leap of 26 feet, 8¼ inches. He also set a championship record in the 100 meters, clocking 10.4 seconds. Over the course of his career at these championships, Owens amassed six gold medals—five in the long jump and one in the 100 meters.

=== 1936 Berlin Summer Olympics ===
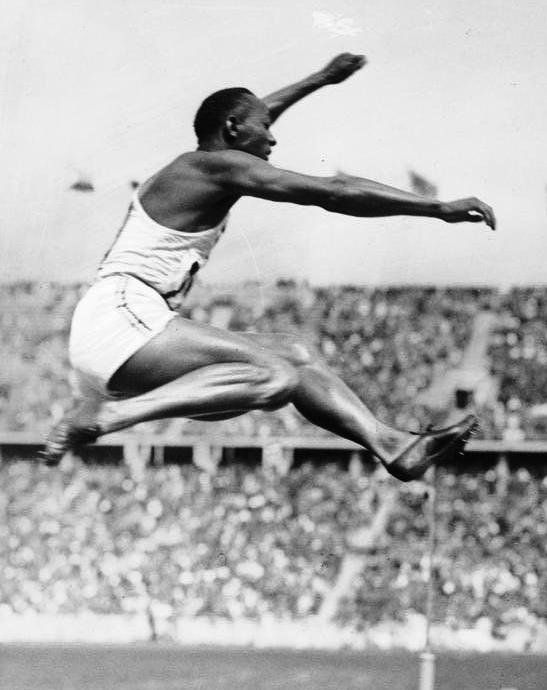
Owens competing in the long jump at the 1936 Summer Olympics in Berlin

In the months prior to the Games, a movement gained momentum in favor of boycotting them given their racist attitudes towards Africans. The NAACP Owens convinced to declare "If there are minorities in Germany who are being discriminated against, the United States should withdraw from the 1936 Olympics." Yet he and others eventually took part after Avery Brundage, president of the American Olympic Committee branded them "un-American agitators".

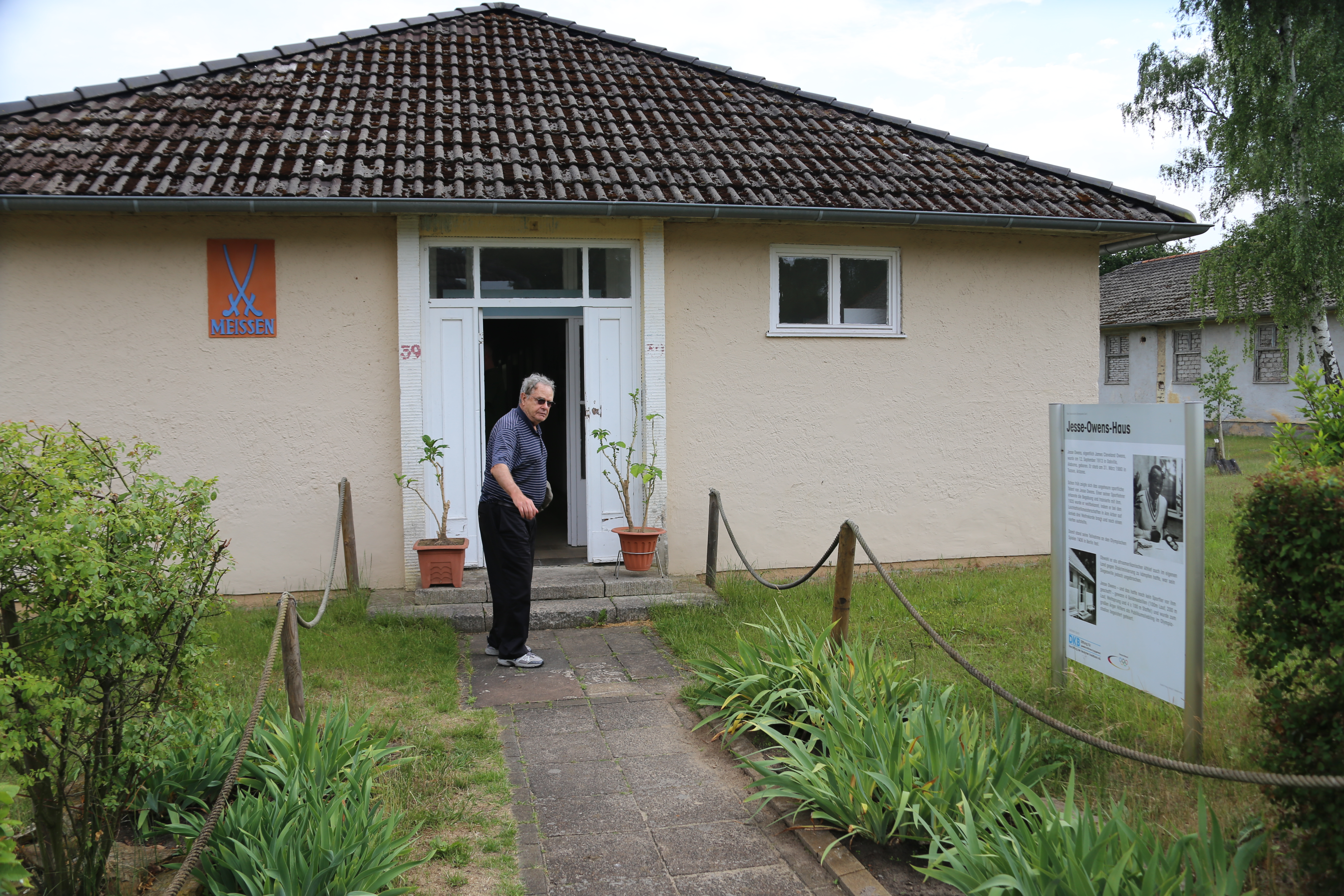
2015 photograph of the U.S. track team house at the 1936 Berlin Olympic Village

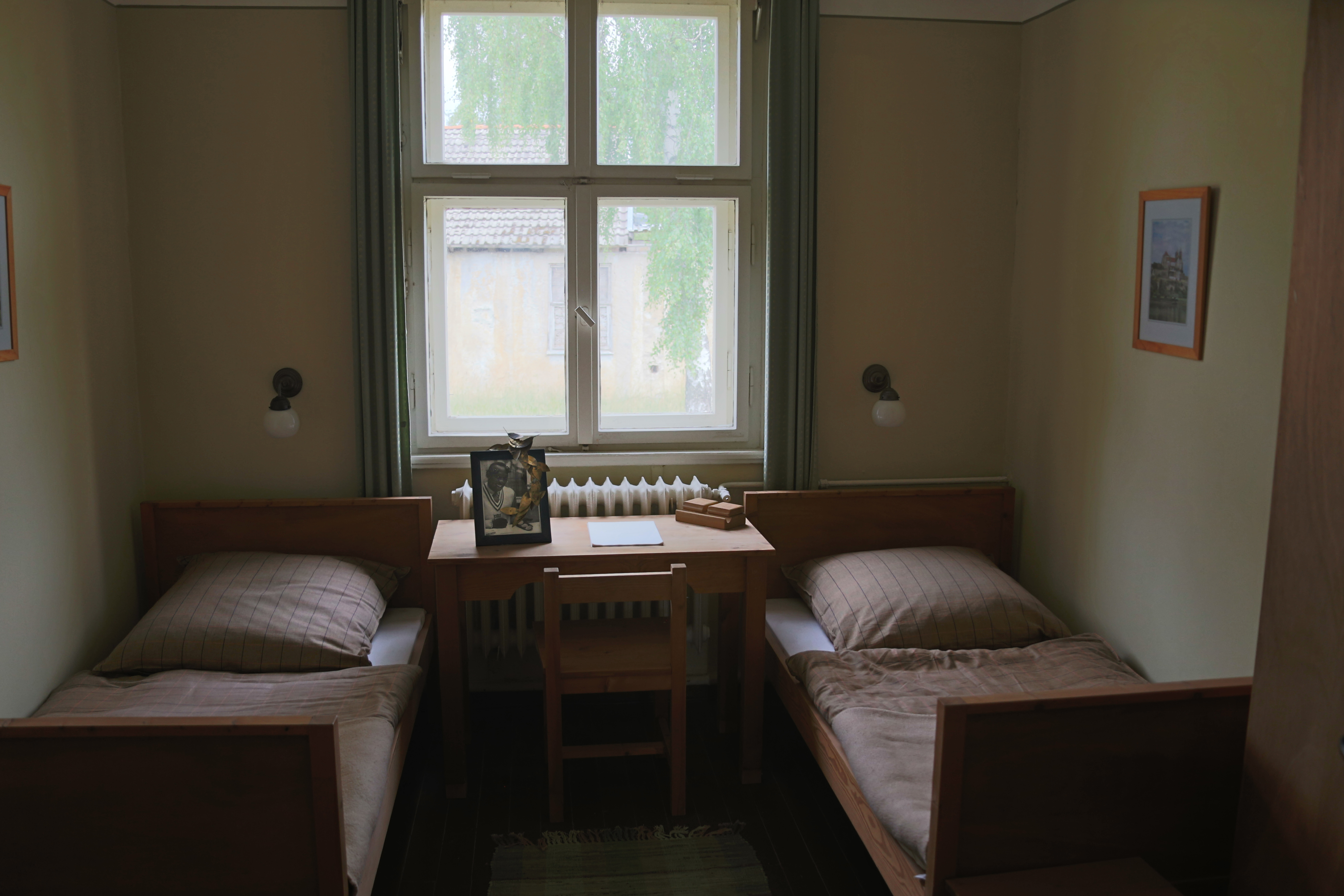
2015 photograph of Jesse Owens's room in the 1936 Olympic Village in Berlin

In 1936, Owens and his US teammates sailed on the SS Manhattan to the Games. Just before the competitions, Adidas athletic shoe company founder Adi Dassler visited Owens in the Olympic village and persuaded him to wear Gebrüder Dassler Schuhfabrik shoes; this was the first sponsorship for a male African American athlete.

On August 3, Owens won the 100 m dash with a time of 10.3 seconds, defeating teammate and college friend Ralph Metcalfe by one tenth of a second and Tinus Osendarp of the Netherlands by two-tenths.

On August 4, he won the long jump with a leap of 8.06 metres (26 ft 5 in) (3¼ inches short of his own world record). He initially credited this achievement to the technical advice that he received from Luz Long, the German competitor whom he defeated, but later admitted that this was not true, as he and Long did not meet until after the competition.

On August 5, he won the 200-meter sprint with a time of 20.7 seconds, defeating fellow American teammate Mack Robinson (Jackie Robinson's older brother).

On August 9, Owens won his fourth gold medal in the 4 × 100 m sprint relay when head coach Lawson Robertson replaced Jewish-American sprinters Marty Glickman and Sam Stoller with Owens and Ralph Metcalfe, who teamed with Frank Wykoff and Foy Draper to set a world record of 39.8 seconds.

Owens's record-breaking performance of four gold medals was not equaled until Carl Lewis won gold medals in the same events at the 1984 Summer Olympics. Owens had set the world record in the long jump with a leap of 8.13 m (26 ft 8 in) in 1935, the year before the Berlin Olympics, and this record stood until it was broken in 1960 by countryman Ralph Boston. Owens was a spectator at the 1960 Summer Olympics when Boston took the gold medal in the long jump.

The long-jump victory is documented, along with many other 1936 events, in the 1938 film Olympia by Leni Riefenstahl. On August 1, 1936, Nazi leader, Adolf Hitler, shook hands with the German victors only and left the stadium. International Olympic Committee president Henri de Baillet-Latour insisted that Hitler greet every medalist or none at all. Hitler opted for the latter and skipped all further medal presentations.

Owens ran his first race on August 2. He ran in the first (10:30 a.m.) and second (3:00 p.m.) qualifying rounds. He tied the Olympic and world record in the first race and broke them in the second race, but this was wind-assisted. Later the same day, Owens's African-American team-mate Cornelius Johnson won gold in the high jump final (which began at 5:00 p.m.) with a new Olympic record of 2.03 meters. Hitler did not publicly congratulate any of the medal winners; even so, the communist New York City newspaper the Daily Worker claimed Hitler received all the track winners except Johnson and left the stadium in a "deliberate snub" after watching Johnson's winning jump. Hitler was subsequently accused of failing to acknowledge Owens (who won gold medals on August 3, 4 (two), and 9) or shake his hand. Owens responded to these claims at the time:

Hitler had a certain time to come to the stadium and a certain time to leave. It happened he had to leave before the victory ceremony after the 100 meters [race began at 5:45 p.m.]. But before he left I was on my way to a broadcast and passed near his box. He waved at me and I waved back. I think it was bad taste to criticize the "man of the hour" in another country.

In an article dated August 4, 1936, African-American newspaper editor Robert L. Vann described witnessing Hitler "salute" Owens for having won gold in the 100 m sprint (August 3):

And then ... wonder of wonders ... I saw Herr Adolph [sic] Hitler, salute this lad. I looked on with a heart which beat proudly as the lad who was crowned king of the 100 meters event, get an ovation the like of which I have never heard before. I saw Jesse Owens greeted by the Grand Chancellor of this country as a brilliant sun peeped out through the clouds. I saw a vast crowd of some 85,000 or 90,000 people stand up and cheer him to the echo.

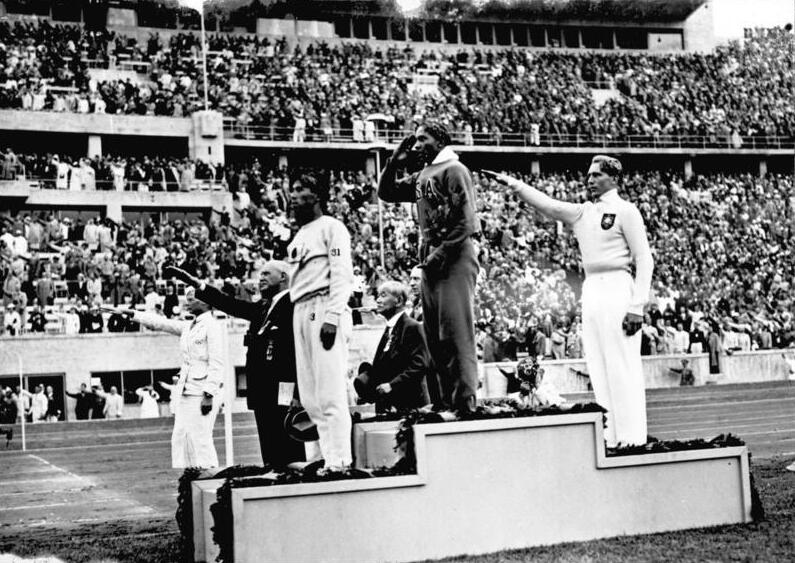
Owens salutes the American flag after winning the long jump at the 1936 Summer Olympics. (L–R) Naoto Tajima, Owens, Luz Long.

In 2014, Eric Brown, British fighter pilot and test pilot, aged 17 in 1936 and later becoming the Fleet Air Arm's most decorated pilot, stated in a BBC documentary: "I actually witnessed Hitler shaking hands with Jesse Owens and congratulating him on what he had achieved". Additionally, an article in The Baltimore Sun in August 1936 reported that Hitler sent Owens a commemorative inscribed cabinet photograph of himself. Later, on October 15, 1936, Owens repeated this claim when he addressed an audience of African Americans at a Republican rally in Kansas City, remarking: "Hitler didn't snub me—it was our president who snubbed me. The president didn't even send me a telegram."

Owens's success at the games caused consternation for Hitler, who was using them to show the world a resurgent Nazi Germany. He and other government officials had hoped that German athletes would dominate the games. Nazi minister Albert Speer wrote that Hitler "was highly annoyed by the series of triumphs by the marvelous colored American runner, Jesse Owens. People whose antecedents came from the jungle were primitive, Hitler said with a shrug; their physiques were stronger than those of civilized whites and hence should be excluded from future games."

In Germany, Owens was allowed to travel with and stay in the same hotels as whites, at a time when African Americans in many parts of the United States had to stay in segregated hotels. When Owens returned to the United States, he was greeted in New York City by Mayor Fiorello La Guardia. During a Manhattan ticker-tape parade in his honor, someone handed Owens a paper bag. Owens paid it little mind until the parade concluded. When he opened it up, he found that the bag contained $10,000 in cash (equivalent to $232,000 in 2025). Owens's wife, Ruth, later said: "And he [Owens] didn't know who was good enough to do a thing like that. And with all the excitement around, he didn't pick it up right away. He didn't pick it up until he got ready to get out of the car".

After the parade, Owens was not permitted to enter through the main doors of the Waldorf Astoria New York and was instead forced to travel to the reception honoring him in a freight elevator. President Franklin D. Roosevelt (FDR) never invited Jesse Owens to the White House. When the Democrats bid for his support, Owens rejected those overtures: as a staunch Republican, he endorsed Alf Landon, in the 1936 presidential race. Owens was employed to do campaign outreach for African American votes for Landon.

== Later life ==
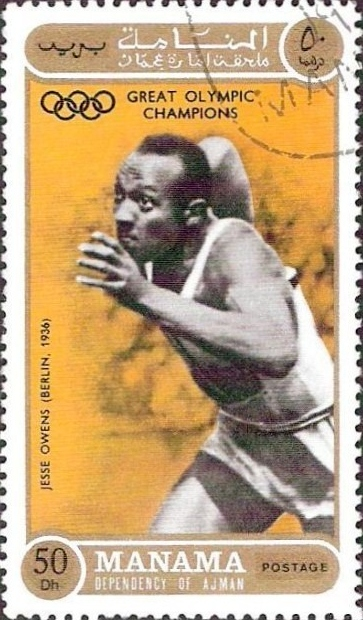
Owens on a 1971 UAE stamp

Owens was quoted saying the secret behind his success was, "I let my feet spend as little time on the ground as possible. From the air, fast down, and from the ground, fast up."

After the 1936 Olympics, Avery Brundage organized a European exhibition tour to profit the AAU and USOC, both of which he led. Owens, exhausted but pressured to compete, ran multiple races across Europe with little rest, food, or support. Despite such treatment, Brundage continued booking events across Scandinavia. Owens, drained and frustrated, eventually refused to continue. Brundage retaliated by having Owens permanently suspended from amateur competition, which immediately ended his career. Owens was angry and stated that "A fellow desires something for himself." As Ruth Owens later recalled, "That Avery Brundage feller tore a big hole inside Jesse." Owens argued that the racial discrimination he had faced throughout his athletic career, such as his ineligibility for scholarships in college and his inability to take classes between training and working to pay his way, meant he had to give up on amateur athletics in pursuit of earning a living.

After returning to the US, racism back home led to financial difficulty despite his successes. Owens struggled to find work and took on menial jobs as a gas station attendant, playground janitor, and manager of a dry cleaning firm and at times resorted to racing against motorbikes, cars, trucks, and horses for a cash prize.

People say it was degrading for an Olympic champion to run against a horse, but what was I supposed to do? I had four gold medals, but you can't eat four gold medals.

Owens was not greeted with the glory and praise that White Olympians had received. He stated, "No one had offered me a job" and "I had jumped farther and run faster than any man ever had before, and it left me with next to nothing." He also said, "So I sold myself into a new kind of slavery. I was no longer a proud man who had won four Olympic gold medals. I was a spectacle, a freak who made his living by competing—dishonestly—against dumb animals." Despite his athletic triumphs, he had to take on manual labor work to afford basic necessities.

Tyson Evans writes, of Owens, that “his dominance shattered the myth of Aryan supremacy and made him an international star... Owens’ achievements played a pivotal role in breaking racial barriers in sports, inspiring future Black athletes, and advancing the civil rights movement.

Owens was banned from attending amateur events to enhance his visibility, and soon discovered that commercial opportunities had almost completely disappeared. In 1937, he briefly toured with a twelve-piece jazz band under contract with Consolidated Artists but found it unfulfilling. He also made appearances at baseball games and other events.

Owens was involved politically and lent his support to the Republican Party and Landon in the 1936 United States Presidential Election, saying that Hitler congratulated him, but that he was snubbed by President Franklin Roosevelt. In 1942, Willis Ward—a friend and former competitor from the University of Michigan—who was then working at Ford Motor Company as Assistant Personnel Director, invited Owens to Detroit. Ward worked for the Ford Motor Company's "ad hoc civil rights division, serving as the liaison between black and white workers" and was an advocate for African American employees. Owens wound up replacing him and remained with Ford until 1946. In the late 1940s, Owens moved his family to Chicago and opened his own public relations agency.

In 1946, Owens collaborated with Abe Saperstein to establish the West Coast Negro Baseball League, where he served as Vice-President and owned the Portland (Oregon) Rosebuds franchise in Oregon. He toured with the Rosebuds, sometimes entertaining the audience in between doubleheader games by competing in races against horses. The WCBA disbanded after only two months.

Owens helped promote the exploitation film Mom and Dad in African American neighborhoods. He tried to make a living as a sports promoter, essentially an entertainer. He would give local sprinters a 10- or 20-yard start and still beat them in the 100-yd (91-m) dash. He also challenged and defeated racehorses; as he revealed later, the trick was to race a high-strung Thoroughbred that would be frightened by the starter's shotgun and give him a bad jump. On the lack of opportunities, Owens added, "There was no television, no big advertising, no endorsements then. Not for a black man, anyway."

During spring training in 1965, Owens was hired by the New York Mets as a running instructor.

Owens ran a dry cleaning business and worked as a gas station attendant to earn a living, but he eventually filed for bankruptcy. In 1966, he was convicted of tax evasion. President Dwight D. Eisenhower enlisted Owens as a goodwill ambassador in 1955 and sent him to India, the Philippines, and Malaya to promote physical exercise and American freedom and economic opportunity. He continued his goodwill tours in the 1960s and 1970s. Although he lost his patronage job with the Illinois Youth Commission in 1960, Owens continued his product endorsement work for corporations such as Quaker Oats, Sears and Roebuck, and Johnson & Johnson. Owens traveled the world and spoke to companies such as the Ford Motor Company and stakeholders such as the United States Olympic Committee. In 1972, he and his wife retired to Arizona.

Owens initially refused to support the black power salute by African-American sprinters Tommie Smith and John Carlos at the 1968 Summer Olympics. He told them:

The black fist is a meaningless symbol. When you open it, you have nothing but fingers—weak, empty fingers. The only time the black fist has significance is when there's money inside. There's where the power lies.

Four years later, in his 1972 book I Have Changed, he revised his opinion:

I realized now that militancy in the best sense of the word was the only answer where the black man was concerned, that any black man who wasn't a militant in 1970 was either blind or a coward.

Owens traveled to Munich for the 1972 Summer Olympics as a guest of the West German government, meeting West German Chancellor Willy Brandt and former boxer Max Schmeling.

From 1974 to 1977, Owens served on the Boys Town Board of Directors, frequently meeting with students to share his life experiences and the challenges that he had overcome.

A few months before his death, Owens unsuccessfully tried to convince President Jimmy Carter to withdraw his demand that the United States boycott the 1980 Moscow Olympics in protest of the Soviet invasion of Afghanistan. He argued that the Olympic ideal was supposed to be observed as a time-out from war and that it was above politics.

=== Death ===
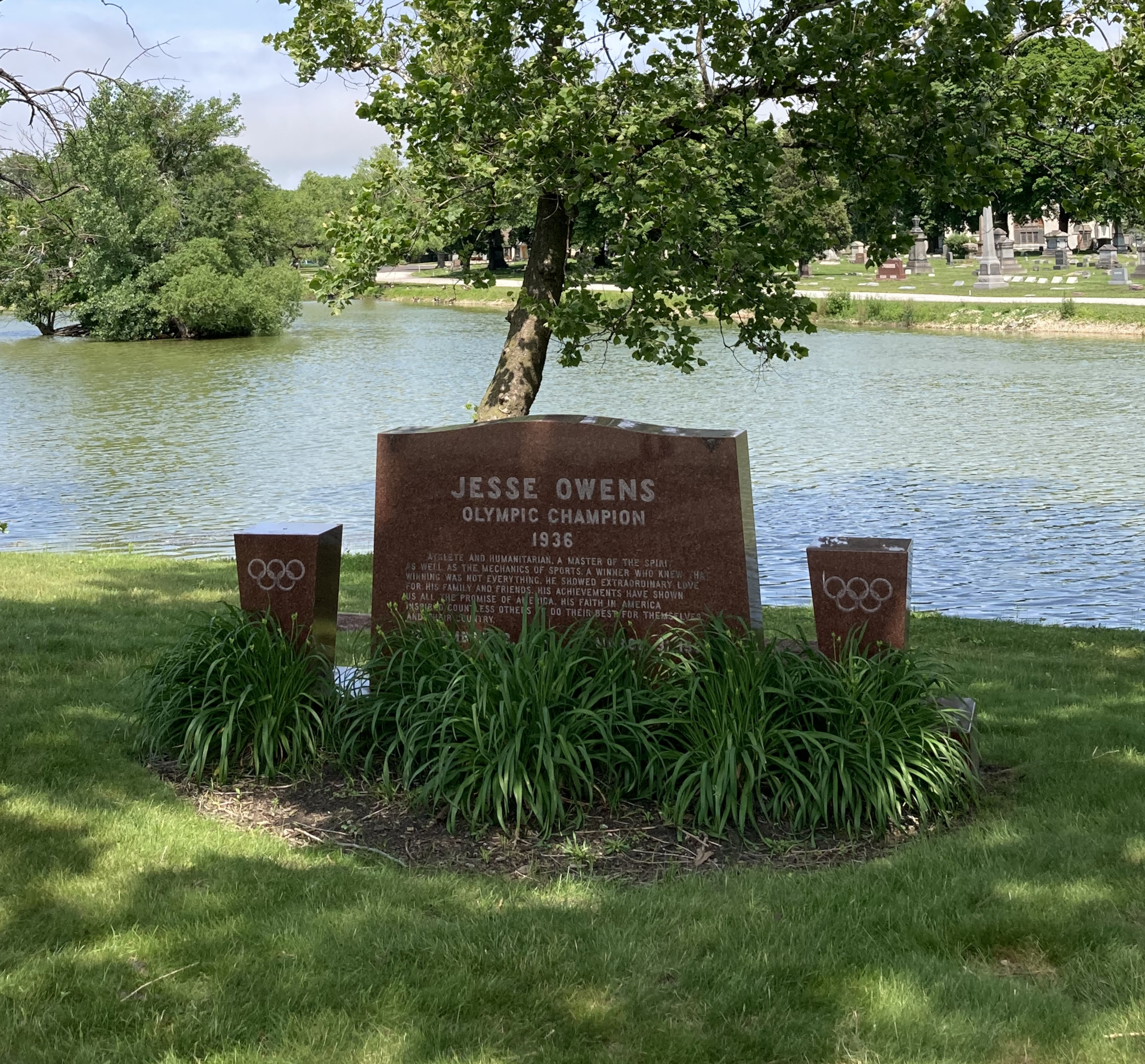
Owens's grave at Oak Woods Cemetery

Owens was a pack-a-day cigarette smoker for 35 years, starting at age 32. Beginning in December 1979, he was hospitalized on and off with an extremely aggressive and drug-resistant type of lung cancer. He died of the disease at age 66 in Tucson, Arizona, on March 31, 1980, with his wife and other family members at his bedside. He was buried next to the Lake of Memories at Oak Woods Cemetery in Chicago, near where his children and extended family still lived. The grave is inscribed:

Jesse Owens. Olympic Champion. 1936. Athlete and humanitarian. A master of the spirit as well as the mechanics of sports. A winner who knew that winning was not everything. He showed extraordinary love for his family and friends. His achievements have shown us all the promise of America. His faith in America inspired countless others to do their best for themselves and their country. September 12, 1913 – March 31, 1980.

President Jimmy Carter issued a tribute to Owens, stating: "Perhaps no athlete better symbolized the human struggle against tyranny, poverty, and racial bigotry."

== Legacy ==
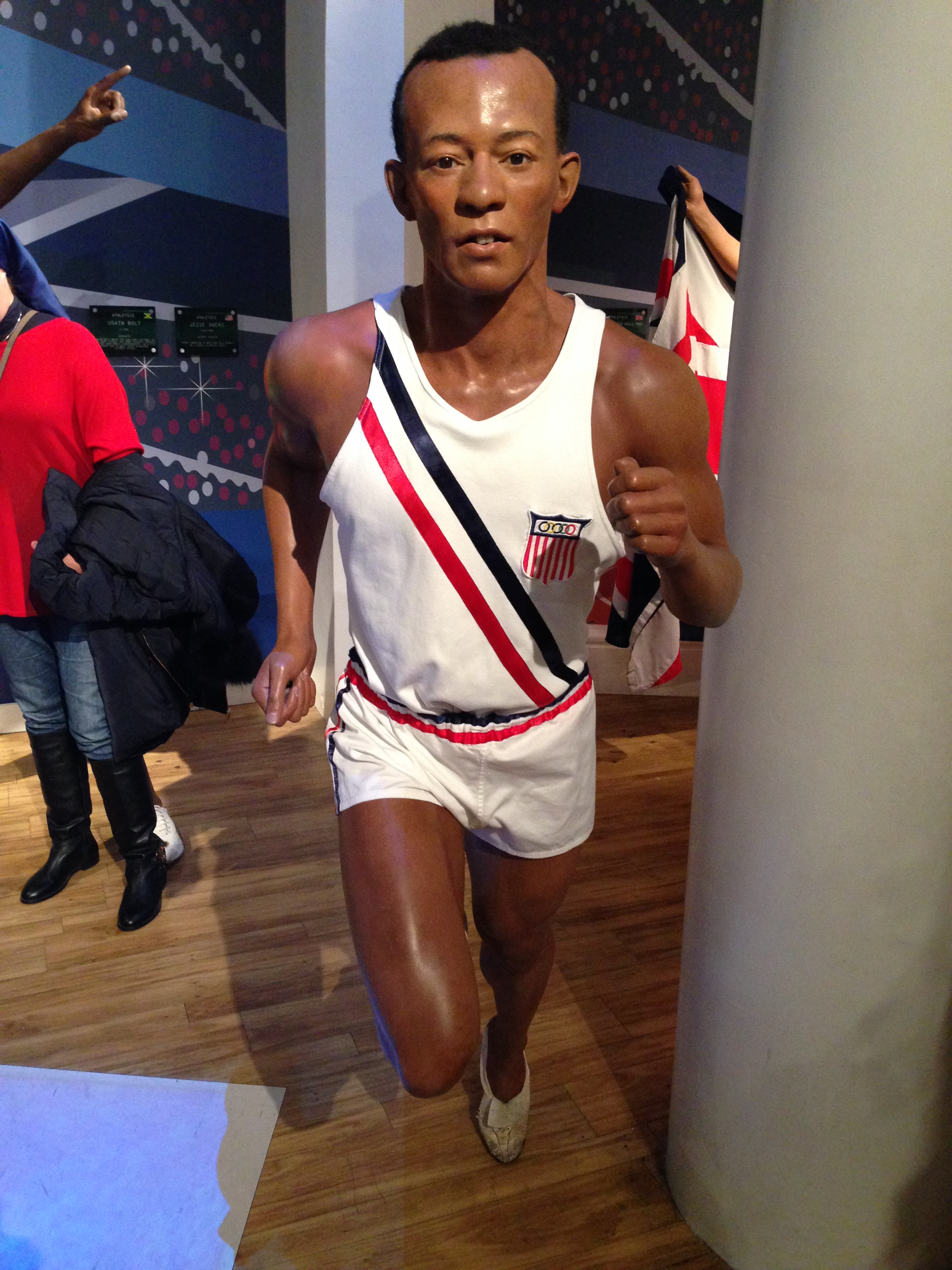
Waxwork of Owens at Madame Tussauds, London

Owens is widely considered one of the greatest athletes in history. Over the course of his career, he earned nine Big Ten titles, eight NCAA titles, and six USA Track & Field titles. His international legacy was cemented at the Olympics, where he won gold in all four events he entered—each in Olympic record time–delivering a powerful rebuttal to Hitler's ideology of Aryan supremacy and dealt a symbolic blow to the Nazi's racist propaganda. Several of his world records endured for decades, including his long jump record, which lasted 25 years, and his 100-meter dash record, which stood for 20.

Following his athletic career, Owens experienced difficulties securing financial stability, a circumstance attributed in part to limited opportunities available to African Americans. Later in life, his contributions to sport and society were acknowledged through honors such as the Presidential Medal of Freedom in 1976 and the Congressional Gold Medal posthumously in 1990.

"Giants like Jesse Owens show us why politics will never defeat the Olympic spirit. His character, his achievements have continued to inspire Americans as they did the whole world in 1936."—Gerald Ford

Owens was honored by naming schools, streets, and athletic facilities after him—including Jesse Owens Memorial Stadium—and his life inspired documentaries, books, and the biopic Race. Notably, the documentary Olympic Pride, American Prejudice highlights his story as part of a broader examination of the 18 Black American athletes who competed in the 1936 Berlin Olympics. He is a member of several halls of fame, including the U.S. Olympic and National Track and Field Hall of Fame.

The dormitory that Owens occupied during the Berlin Olympics was fully restored into a living museum, with pictures of his accomplishments, and a letter (intercepted by the Gestapo) from a fan urging him not to shake hands with Hitler.

== Athletic achievements ==
=== Fairmount Junior High School ===
Note: (Note: He set junior high school records in the 100 metres in 10.6 seconds, the 75-yard dash in 7.4 seconds, the 220-yard dash in 21.4 seconds, the high jump at 6 feet flat, and the long jump with 22 feet 11¾ inches.)

Annual Cleveland Athletic Club Indoor Meet at Cleveland Public Hall

- 3× High jump champion (1928–1930)
- 40-yard low hurdles champion (1929)
- 40-yard dash champion (1929)

=== East Technical High School ===
Note: (Note: In his high school career, Owens finished first in 75 of the 79 competitions he entered. He established a world record in the 50-yard dash and his 9.4 second 100-yard dash equaled the world record and set a national high school record that stood until 1967. He also set national high school records in the 220-yard dash at 20.7 seconds, which lasted 25 years, and the long jump at 24 feet 11¼ inches, which stood for 16 years.)

Mansfield Interscholastic Relays

- 2× Long jump champion (1932, 1933)
- 100-yard dash champion (1933 tied H.S. record)
- 220-yard dash champion (1933)
- 4 × 220 yard relay champion (1933)

Intraschool Meet in Cleveland (June 3, 1933)

- 100 metres champion
- 200 metres champion
- Long jump champion (H.S. record)
- 4 × 220 yard relay champion

OHSAA State Championships (Note: Set state records in the long jump and 4 × 220-yard relays in 1932; In 1933, he set state records in all four events he competed in, the only athlete to ever set four state records in a single state track meet.)

- 2× State Champions – East Technical HS (1932, 1933)
- 3× Long jump champion (1931–1933 H.S. record)
- 2× 100-yard dash champion (1932, 1933)
- 2× 220-yard dash champion (1932, 1933 H.S. record)
- 2× 4 × 220-yard relay champion (1932, 1933)

National High School Championships (Note: Broke the national high school records in the 100-yard dash and long jump; Set a meet record in the semi-final heat of the 4 × 220-yard relay.)(June 17, 1933)

- National Champions – East Technical HS
- 100-yard dash champion (tied WR)
- 220-yard dash champion (H.S. record)
- Long jump champion

Ohio State Fair (August 31, 1933)

- 100-yard dash champion

=== College – Ohio State University ===
Note: (Note: Owens competed in and won all 42 events in 1936.)

West Virginia Indoor Relays (February 10, 1934)

- 60 metres champion (tied WR)

Freshman Dual Meet vs. Indiana (February 20, 1934)

- 60-yard dash champion
- Long jump champion

Freshman Dual Meet vs. Michigan (February 26, 1934)

- 60-yard dash champion (tied WR)
- Long jump champion

Freshman Dual Meet vs. Chicago (March 3, 1934)

- 60-yard dash champion
- Long jump champion

AAU Meet in Cleveland (Note: Broke the AAU record and equaled his own world record.) (March 24, 1934)

- 50-yard dash champion (tied WR)

City of Cincinnati AAU Indoor Meet (March 31, 1934)

- 50-yard dash champion (tied WR)
- Long jump champion

Freshman Dual Meet vs. Purdue (May 4, 1934)

- 100-yard dash champion (Note: Time was taken from his 120-yard dash; Set the world records at 90 yards and 120 yards.)
- 220-yard dash champion
- Long jump champion

Freshman Dual Meet vs. Michigan (Note: Equaled the freshman record in the 100-yard dash and broke the freshman records in the 220-yard dash and long jump.) (May 11, 1934)

- 100-yard dash champion
- 220-yard dash champion
- Long jump champion

Annual Intramural Meet (May 22, 1934)

- 100-yard dash champion
- 220-yard dash champion
- Long jump champion

Big Ten Freshman Championships (May 26, 1934)

- 100-yard dash champion
- 220-yard dash champion
- Long jump champion

Millrose Games (February 2, 1935)

- 60-yard dash champion

Dual Meet vs. Indiana (February 9, 1935)

- 60-yard dash champion
- Long jump champion

Dual Meet vs. Illinois (February 15, 1935)

- 60-yard dash champion
- 70-yard high hurdles champion
- 75-yard low hurdles champion
- Long jump champion

Dual Meet vs. Michigan (March 2, 1935)

- 65-yard low hurdles champion

St. Louis Relays (April 5, 1935)

- 50-yard dash champion (tied WR)

Drake Relays (April 26, 1935)

- 100-yard dash champion
- Long jump champion (NR)

Dual Meet vs. Notre Dame (May 4, 1935)

- 100-yard dash champion
- 220-yard dash champion
- Long jump champion

Dual Meet vs. Michigan (May 11, 1935)

- 100-yard dash champion
- 220-yard dash champion
- 220-yard low hurdles champion
- Long jump champion

Quad Meet vs. Wisconsin, Northwestern and Chicago (May 18, 1935)

- 100-yard dash champion (tied WR)
- 220-yard dash champion
- 220-yard low hurdles champion (WR)
- Long jump champion

Dual Meet vs. USC (June 15, 1935)

- 100-yard dash champion
- 220-yard dash champion
- 220-yard low hurdles champion
- Long jump champion

Butler Indoor Relays

- 2× 60-yard dash champion (1935 WR, 1936)
- 2× 60-yard low hurdles champion (1935, 1936)
- Long jump champion (1936)

Penn Relays (April 25, 1936)

- 100 metres champion
- Long jump champion
- Sprint medley relay champion

Dual Meet vs. Michigan (May 2, 1936)

- 100-yard dash champion (tied #WR)
- 220-yard dash champion
- 220-yard low hurdles champion
- Long jump champion

Tri-Meet vs. Notre Dame and Michigan State (May 9, 1936)

- 100-yard dash champion
- 220-yard dash champion
- 220-yard low hurdles champion
- Long jump champion

Dual Meet vs. Wisconsin (May 16, 1936)

- 100-yard dash champion (#WR)
- 220-yard dash champion
- 220-yard low hurdles champion
- Long jump champion

Dual Meet vs. USC (June 13, 1936)

- 100-yard dash champion (tied WR)
- 220-yard dash champion
- 220-yard low hurdles champion
- Long jump champion

Central Intercollegiate Conference Championships (1935, 1936)

- Central Intercollegiate Conference Champions – Ohio State University (1935)
- 2× 100-yard dash champion (1935, 1936)
- 2× 220-yard dash champion (1935, 1936)
- 2× Long jump champion (1935, 1936)

Big Ten Indoor Championships (March 9, 1935)

- 60-yard dash champion (1935 WR)

Big Ten Outdoor Championships (Note: Broke five world records and tied another at the 1935 Championships (Long jump, 100-yard dash, 200 metres, 220-yard dash, 200m low hurdles, and 220 yard low hurdles).)

- 2× Long jump champion (1935 WR, 1936)
- 2× 100-yard dash champion (1935 tied WR, 1936)
- 2× 220-yard dash champion (1935 WR, 1936)
- 2× 220-yard low hurdles champion (1935 WR, 1936)

NCAA Championships

- 2× Long jump champion (1935, 1936)
- 100-yard dash champion (1935)
- 100 metres champion (1936 WR)
- 2× 220-yard low hurdles champion (1935, 1936)
- 220-yard dash champion (1935)
- 200 metres champion (1936)

=== USA Track and Field Championships ===
USA Outdoor Track and Field Championships

- 100 metres silver medalist (1934)
- 2× 100 metres bronze medalist (1933, 1935)
- Long jump silver medalist (1935)
- 100 metres gold medalist (1936)
- 3× Long jump gold medalist (1933, 1934, 1936)

USA Indoor Track and Field Championships

- 60 metres silver medalist (1935 WR, semi-final heat)
- 2× Long jump gold medalist (1934 WR, 1935 WR)

=== 1936 Olympics ===
Olympic Trials

- 100 metres champion
- 200 metres champion (WR)
- Long jump champion

Olympics

- 100 metres gold medalist (OR)
- 200 metres gold medalist (WR)
- Long jump gold medalist (OR)
- 4 × 100 metres relay gold medalist (WR)

=== World records ===
50-yard dash

- 1933: 5.2 seconds (Note: Subsequently tied his own world record on two separate occasions on March 24 and 31, 1934.)
  - February 19, 1939: Broken by Henry Norwood Ewell in 5.1 seconds

60-yard dash (indoor)

- March 23, 1935: 6.09 seconds (Note: Previously tied the world record on February 26, 1934, in 6.2 seconds and broke the world record on March 9, 1935, in 6.1 seconds.)
  - February 28, 1959: Broken by Herb Carper in 6 seconds flat

60 metres dash (indoor)

- February 23, 1935: 6.6 seconds (Note: Previously tied the world record on February 10, 1934, in 6.8 seconds.)
  - March 12, 1955: Broken by Heinz Fütterer in 6.5 seconds

100-yard dash

- June 17, 1933: Tied WR in 9.4 seconds (Note: Tied the world record a total of seven times throughout his career. Chicago June 17, 1933; Columbus May 19, 1934; Evanston May 18, 1935; Ann Arbor May 25, 1935; Columbus May 2, 1936; Columbus June 13, 1936; Chicago June 20, 1936 (official time taken during 100m race); Unofficially broke the world record at Wisconsin May 16, 1936, with a wind assisted time of 9.3 seconds.) (Note: At the 1935 Big Ten Championships on May 25, 1935, more than half the official timers actually clocked Owens at 9.3 seconds, making his actual time approximately 9.35 seconds, but the rules of the day stipulated that each runner got attributed the slowest time recorded. The timers also may have heeded the head official's admonition to "watch for the back foot. See it cross the finish line, and then press the old forefinger.")
  - May 15, 1948: Broken by Melvin E. Patton in 9.3 seconds

100 metres dash

- June 20, 1936: 10.2 seconds
  - August 3, 1956: Broken by Willie Williams in 10.1 seconds

220-yard dash

- May 25, 1935: 20.3 seconds (Note: Also broke the world record for the 200 metres (straight).)
  - May 7, 1949: Broken by Melvin E. Patton in 20.2 seconds

200 metres dash (curve)

- August 5, 1936: 20.7 seconds (Note: Previously broke the world record on July 12, 1936, with a time of 21 seconds flat.)
  - May 26, 1951: Broken by Andy Stanfield in 20.6 seconds

220-yard low hurdles

- May 25, 1935: 22.6 seconds (Note: Also broke the world record for the 200 metres hurdles; Chief timer Phil Diamond was distracted just as the gun fired and notified the number 4 timer that he was one of the 3 official timers. The number 4 timer got 22.6 seconds, but the originally selected two timers timed Owens in 22.4 seconds. The time should have been 22.4, but Diamond refused to certify anything faster than a 22.6 "because it was a world-record application blank".) (Note: Previously broke the world record on May 18, 1935, with a time of 22.9 seconds.)
  - June 8, 1940: Broken by Fred Wolcott in 22.5 seconds

Long jump

- May 25, 1935: 26 feet 8¼ inches or 8.13 metres
  - August 12, 1960: Broken by Ralph Boston with a leap of 26 feet 11¼ inches or 8.21 metres

Long jump (indoor)

- February 23, 1935: 25 feet 9 inches or 7.85 metres (Note: Also broke the world record at the same event with a leap of 25 ft 7 7/8 in (7.820 m); Previously broke the world record on February 24, 1934, with a leap of 25 ft 3 1/4 in (7.703 m).)
  - February 20, 1960: Broken by Irvin Roberson with a leap of 25 feet 9.5 inches or 7.86 metres

4 × 100 metres relay

- August 9, 1936: 39.8 seconds along with Ralph Metcalfe, Foy Draper, and Frank Wykoff (Note: Also broke the world record the day before on August 8 with a relay time of 40 seconds flat.)
  - December 1, 1956: Broken by Ira Murchison, Leamon King, Thane Baker, and Bobby Morrow in 39.5 seconds

=== Non-standard world records ===
90-yard dash

- Set by Charles Paddock in 1921 with a time of 8.8 seconds
- Broken by Jesse Owens on May 4, 1934, with a time of 8.6 seconds

100-yard dash (15-yard head start)

- Set by Frank Wykoff in 1930 with a time of 8.7 seconds
- Broken by Jesse Owens on April 23, 1935, in 8.6 seconds (Note: One of the 3 official timers clocked him in 8.4 seconds.)

120-yard dash

- Set by Howard Drew in 1914 with a time of 11.6 seconds
- Broken by Jesse Owens on May 4, 1934, with a time of 11.5 seconds

== Recognition ==
=== Halls of Fame ===
- Helms Athletic Foundation Hall of Fame – Inaugural Class of 1949
- Drake Relays Hall of Fame – Inaugural Class of 1959
- Alabama Sports Hall of Fame – Class of 1970
- OATCCC Hall of Fame – Class of 1970
- National Track and Field Hall of Fame – Inaugural Class of 1974
- Greater Cleveland Sports Hall of Fame – Inaugural Class of 1976
- Ohio State Athletics Hall of Fame – Inaugural Class of 1977
- NSMA Hall of Fame – Class of 1978
- U.S. Olympic Hall of Fame – Inaugural Class of 1983
- National High School Hall of Fame – Class of 1983
- Arizona Runner's Hall of Fame – Class of 2012
- National High School Track and Field Hall of Fame – Inaugural Class of 2018
- Collegiate Athlete Hall of Fame – Inaugural Class of 2022
- United States Athletics Hall of Fame – Inaugural Class of 2023
- Ohio Sports Hall of Fame – Inaugural Class of 2024
- East Technical High School Hall of Fame – Honorary Inductee

=== Awards and tributes ===
- 1930: The city's athletic council voted him the most outstanding junior high athlete.
- 1936: The Associated Press named Owens the most outstanding athlete of the Olympic Trials.
- 1936: AP Athlete of the Year (Male)
- 1936: Four Olympic oak saplings, one for each Olympic gold medal, from the German Olympic Committee, planted.
- 1950: Voted the greatest black athlete of all time and the greatest track and field athlete for the first half of the century in a poll conducted by the Associated Press.
- 1950: At the 50th anniversary of the Big Ten Championships, Owens was unanimously named the top track athlete of the half-century and the only athlete selected for the all-star team in more than one individual event—earning spots in the 100-yard dash, 220-yard dash, 220-yard low hurdles, and long jump.
- 1955: President Dwight D. Eisenhower honored Owens by naming him an "Ambassador of Sports".
- October 18, 1955: Track and Field magazine names Owens all-time Track and Field athlete.
- 1956: Owens was elected an honorary member of OSU's chapter of the Senior honor society Sphinx.
- 1959: Owens returned to Des Moines and was celebrated at the Drake Relays as the most outstanding athlete to compete in the first 50 years of the competition.
- October 1963: Track & Field News named Owens the athlete of the decade from 1931–1940.
- 1965: The Ohio State Alumni Association presented Owens with the Alumni Citizenship Award.
- 1970: Receives OSU Centennial Award.
- 1971: The Ivory Coast named the street on which the U.S. embassy is located "Rue Jesse Owens".
- 1972: The Ohio State University awarded Owens an honorary doctorate of athletic arts.
- 1974: The NCAA presented Owens with the Theodore Roosevelt Award.
- 1976: Awarded Presidential Medal of Freedom by President Gerald Ford.
- 1976: Recipient of the Silver Olympic Order for his quadruple victory in the 1936 games and his defense of sport and the ethics of sport.
- 1978: Receives the Roy Wilkins Award from the NAACP.
- 1979: Awarded Living Legend Award by President Jimmy Carter.
- 1979: The Spirit of America Festival honored Owens with the Audie Murphy Patriotism Award.
- 1980: Asteroid newly discovered by Antonín Mrkos at the Kleť Observatory named 6758 Jesseowens.
- 1980: Jesse Owens Academy in Chicago was named in his honor, but it closed in 2013 and merged with Gompers Elementary. Following public outcry, the merged school was once again named after him.
- 1980: The Chicago Park District renamed Stony Island Park, Jesse Owens Park in his honor.
- 1980: Jesse Owens Park, in Tucson, Arizona, is a center of local youth athletics there.
- 1980: The Ohio Stadium track and University Recreation Centers were named after Owens.
- 1981: USA Track and Field created the Jesse Owens Award which is given annually to the country's top track and field athlete.
- 1981: The International Athletic Association has annually presented the Jesse Owens International Trophy, with the exception of a ten-year break from 2004 to 2014.
- 1982: In Cleveland, Ohio, a statue of Owens in his Ohio State track suit was installed at Fort Huntington Park, west of the old Courthouse.
- 1982: The Big Ten Athlete of the Year award is named in his honor.
- 1983: Track and field stadium at Cal State Los Angeles is named in Owens's honor.
- 1984: Street south of the Olympic Stadium in Berlin renamed Jesse-Owens-Allee
- 1984: For his contribution to sports in Los Angeles, Owens was honored with a Los Angeles Memorial Coliseum "Court of Honor" plaque by the Coliseum commissioners.
- 1984: Secondary school Jesse Owens Realschule/Oberschule in Lichtenberg, Berlin named for Owens.
- 1987: NYC Parks named the playground at Stuyvesant and Lafayette Avenues the Jesse Owens Playground.
- March 28, 1990: Posthumously presented a Congressional Gold Medal by President George H. W. Bush.
- 1990 and 1998: Two U.S. postage stamps have been issued to honor Owens, one in each year.
- 1996: Owens's hometown of Oakville, Alabama, dedicated the Jesse Owens Memorial Park and Museum along with a statue in his honor at the same time that the Olympic torch came through the community, 60 years after his Olympic wins. An article in the Wall Street Journal of June 7, 1996, covered the event and included this inscription written by poet Charles Ghigna that appears on a bronze plaque at the park:

May this light shine forever
as a symbol to all who run
for the freedom of sport,
for the spirit of humanity,
for the memory of Jesse Owens.

- 1999: Ranked the sixth greatest North American athlete of the twentieth century and the highest-ranked in his sport by ESPN.
- 1999: On the six-man shortlist for the BBC's Sports Personality of the Century.
- 2001: Ohio State University dedicated Jesse Owens Memorial Stadium for track and field events. A sculpture honoring Owens occupies a place of honor in the esplanade leading to the rotunda entrance to Ohio Stadium. Owens competed for the Buckeyes on the track surrounding the football field that existed prior to the 2001 expansion of Ohio Stadium. The campus also houses three recreational centers for students and staff named in his honor.
- 2002: Scholar Molefi Kete Asante listed Owens on his list of 100 Greatest African Americans.
- 2005: Posthumously receives the IAAF Golden Order of Merit.
- 2009: At the 2009 World Athletic Championships in Berlin, all members of the United States Track and Field team wore badges with "JO" on them to commemorate Owens's victories in the same stadium 73 years before.
- 2009: The Drake Relays honored Owens as the Athlete of the Century.
- 2010: Ohio Historical Society proposed Owens as a finalist from a statewide vote for inclusion in Statuary Hall at the United States Capitol.
- November 15, 2010: The city of Cleveland renamed East Roadway, between Rockwell and Superior avenues in Public Square, Jesse Owens Way.
- 2011: Ohio State University paid tribute to Owens by unveiling the Jesse Owens Memorial Statue outside the Jesse Owens Memorial Stadium.
- 2011: In the Big Ten Icons countdown of the Top 50 Athletes on the Big Ten Network, Owens was ranked the third greatest athlete in Big Ten history.
- 2012: 80,000 individual pixels in the audience seating area were used as a giant video screen to show footage of Owens running around the stadium in the London 2012 Summer Olympics opening ceremony, just after the Olympic cauldron had been lit.
- 2012: The Jesse Owens Room, named in his honor at the NCAA campus in Indianapolis.
- 2016: A portion of Highway 36 beginning at I-65 Exit 328 and ending at the Lawrence County line just west of Danville was renamed Jesse Owens Parkway.
- 2016: The Jesse Owens Olympic Spirit Award is presented annually by the U.S. Olympic Committee to recognize those who have served as an inspiration in society.
- 2017: Inaugural recipient of the AAU Gussie Crawford Lifetime Achievement Award.
- July 2018: Ohio governor John Kasich dedicated the 75th state park, Jesse Owens State Park. It is located on AEP reclaimed mining land south of Zanesville, OH.
- 2021: A horticulturally propagated tree from the original Jesse Owens Olympic Oak was planted by the Rockefeller Park Lagoon. In 2022, another was planted beside the original tree at James Ford Rhodes High School.
- 2023: The team at University Circle Inc. dedicated the Jesse Owens Olympic Oak Plaza in Rockefeller Park.
- 2024: Posthumously received the Olympians for Life award by World Olympians Association.
- 2024: Named the greatest U.S. Summer Olympic athlete of all time by The Sporting News.
- 2024: A plaque in honor of Owens's track and field accomplishments on the Day of days is dedicated outside the University of Michigan's Ferry Field.
- 2024: The former home of Owens was unanimously approved to become a Cleveland landmark.
- Phoenix, Arizona named the Jesse Owens Medical Centre in his honor, as well as Jesse Owens Parkway.
- LA County Parks and Recreation renamed Sportsman Park to Jesse Owens Park in his honor.
- P.S. 26 in Brooklyn, New York, is named the Jesse Owens School.

=== Literature ===
- 2006: The Book Thief by Markus Zusak is released, in which a character named Rudy Steiner idolizes Owens.
- 2025: The book Jesse Owens by Alain Foix was awarded the Sportilivre Prize by the Voies Civiles think tank.

== The Jesse Owens Rising Star Award ==
Beginning in 2024, a collaboration among the Owens family, the Jesse Owens Foundation, and the Wanda Diamond League recognized two exceptional emerging top-performing male and female athletes, aged 23 or under.

Each winner receives a bronze statuette of Owens designed by Belgian sculptor Jan Desmarets. Two oak trees are planted in the host city in honor of the two winners.

The inaugural awards ceremony was held in Brussels in September 2024, honoring 2023 World Championship silver medalist Diribe Welteji as the top female performer and 2024 Olympic gold medalist Letsile Tebogo as the top male performer.

== Filmography ==
| Year | Title | Ref. |
|---|---|---|
| 1936 | Berlin 1936: Games of the XI Olympiad | |
| 1938 | Olympia | |
| 1948 | Kings of the Olympics | |
| 1948 | Olympic Cavalcade | |
| 1964 | Valentine's Day: All Through the Night | |
| 1966 | Jesse Owens Returns to Berlin | |
| 1984 | The Jesse Owens Story (Note: A Primetime Emmy Award-winning biographical film with Dorian Harewood portraying Owens.) | |
| 2012 | Jesse Owens (American Experience) | |
| 2016 | Race (Note: Stephan James portrays Owens.) | |
| 2016 | Olympic Pride, American Prejudice | |
| 2021 | Capturing Black Lightning: Jesse Owens | |
| 2022 | Olympic Oaks: Continuing Jesse Owens' Legacy | |
| 2024 | Triumph: Jesse Owens and the Berlin Olympics | |

=== Other ===
- 2017: In Get Out, a film directed by Jordan Peele, the villainous patriarch Roman Armitage lost the qualification round for the 1936 Olympics to Owens, instigating his neurosurgical research and theft of young black men via brain transplant.
- 2019: In Jojo Rabbit, directed by Taika Waititi, an incarnation of Adolf Hitler refers to the character Elsa as "a little female Jewish Jesse Owens".
- 2023: In The Boys in the Boat, Jyuddah Jaymes portrays Owens in a cameo as the University of Washington Eight rowing team enters the stadium with the United States Olympic team.

== See also ==
- List of multiple Olympic gold medalists at a single Games
- NCAA Track and Field Championships
- USA Track and Field Championships
- Jesse Owens Memorial Stadium
- Jesse Owens International Trophy
- Night of Legends awards
