= Night of Legends awards =

Awards given out by USA Track and Field

The Night of Legends is an annual track and field awards ceremony that announces the highest accolades given out by USA Track & Field (USATF), namely the Jesse Owens Male Athlete of the Year Award and the Jackie Joyner-Kersee Female Athlete of the Year Award. Before 2013, both the men's and women's awards were called the Jesse Owens Award. Since 2018, the ceremony is called the Night of Legends; before then, the awards were given out at USATF's annual meeting.

As the country's highest award for the sport, it was named after Jesse Owens in recognition of his significant career, which included four gold medals at the 1936 Olympic Games. First awarded in 1981 to hurdler Edwin Moses, it was created to recognize the season's top American performer in track and field competitions. In 1996, the award was divided into two categories, with both a male and female winner. The 1996 winners, Michael Johnson and Gail Devers, each won two gold medals at that year's Olympics in Atlanta. Until 2008 the award was voted on by members of the United States athletics media only, but in 2009 fans were able to vote via the USATF website, with their opinions contributing 10% of the overall result.

The winners of the award are typically announced in late November or early December after the end of the outdoor track and field season. A number of athletes have received the award on more than one occasion: Jackie Joyner-Kersee was the first to do so with back-to-back wins in 1986 and 1987, while Carl Lewis won his second award in 1991. Michael Johnson was the first to receive the award three times (winning consecutively from 1994 to 1996) and Marion Jones became the first woman to collect three awards after wins in 1997, 1998 and 2002. In 2012, Allyson Felix won the award for the fourth time, thus distinguishing herself as the athlete with the most wins. Winners receive a replica of the award while the original remains on permanent display at the USATF Headquarters in Indianapolis, Indiana. As of 2013, the female athlete of the year award was renamed the Jackie Joyner-Kersee Award.

== List of recipients ==
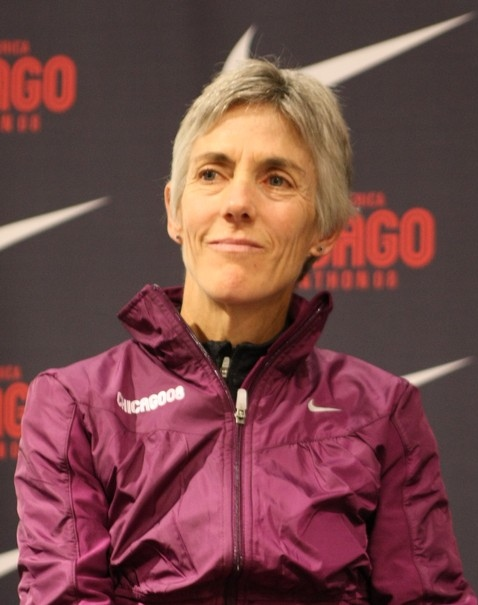
Joan Benoit received the award in 1984 after winning the first Olympic marathon for women.

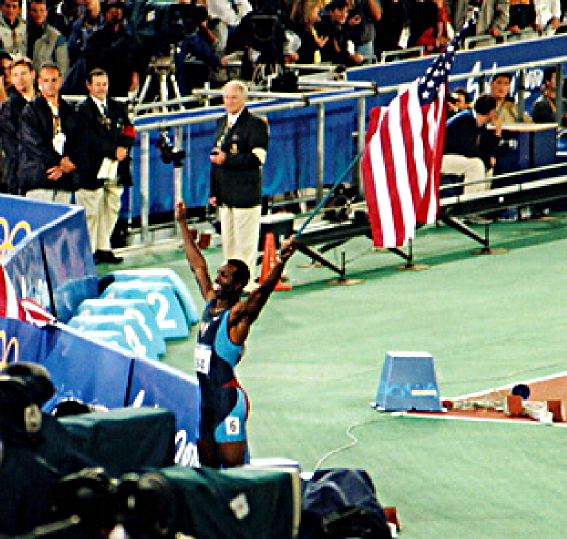
Michael Johnson won the award three years running.

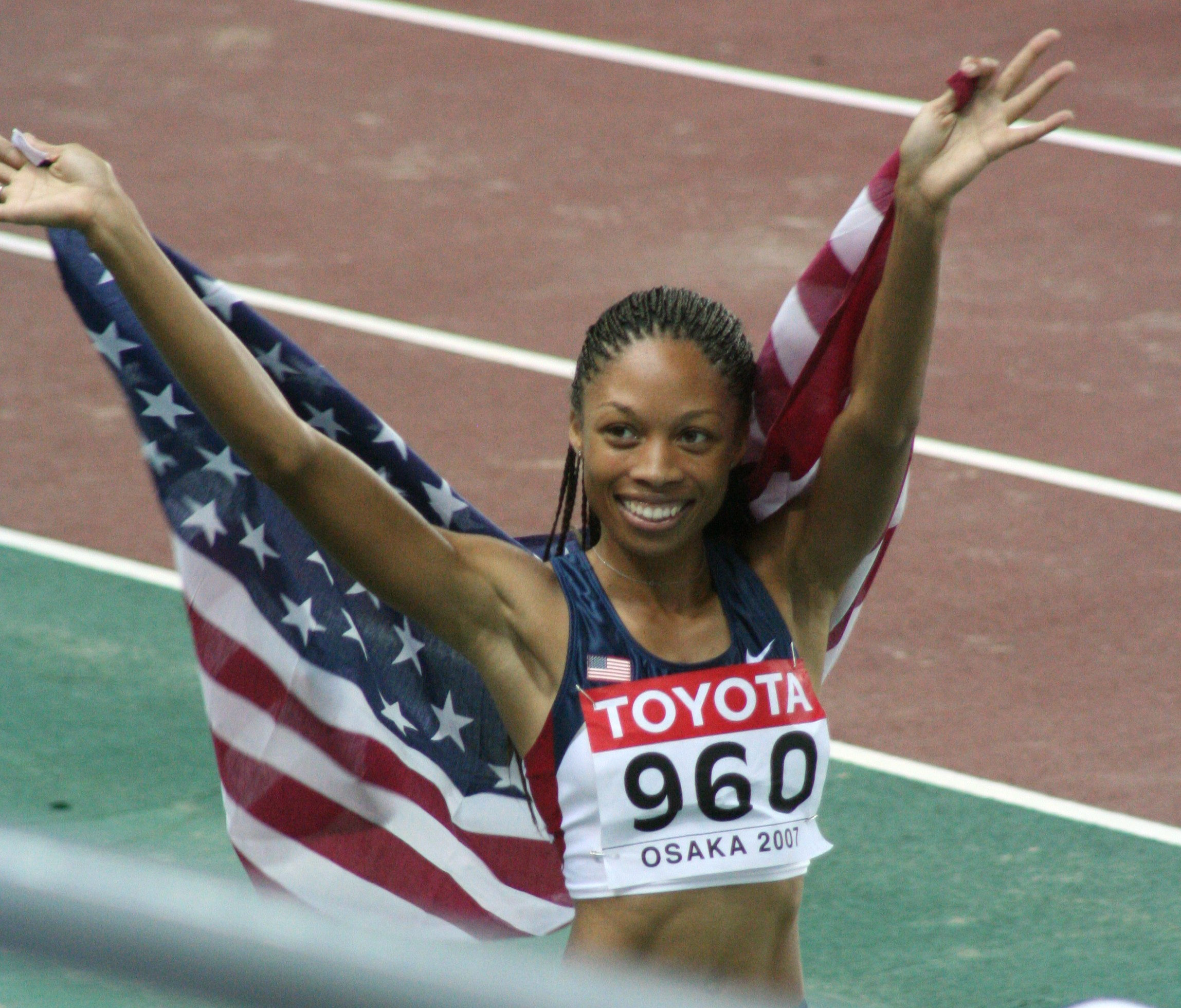
Allyson Felix received the award in 2005, 2007, 2010, 2012 and 2015.

Year	Male winner	Female winner	Ref.
1981	Edwin Moses	—	
1982	Carl Lewis	—	
1983	—	Mary Decker	
1984	—	Joan Benoit	
1985	Willie Banks	—	
1986	—	Jackie Joyner-Kersee	
1987	—	Jackie Joyner-Kersee	
1988	—	Florence Griffith Joyner	
1989	Roger Kingdom	—	
1990	—	Lynn Jennings	
1991	Carl Lewis	—	
1992	Kevin Young	—	
1993	—	Gail Devers	
1994	Michael Johnson	—	
1995	Michael Johnson	—	
1996	Michael Johnson	Gail Devers	
1997	Allen Johnson	Marion Jones	
1998	John Godina	Marion Jones	
1999	Maurice Greene	Inger Miller	
2000	Angelo Taylor	Stacy Dragila	
2001	John Godina	Stacy Dragila	
2002	Tim Montgomery	Marion Jones	
2003	Tom Pappas	Deena Kastor	
2004	Justin Gatlin	Joanna Hayes	
2005	Justin Gatlin	Allyson Felix	
2006	Jeremy Wariner	Sanya Richards	
2007	Tyson Gay	Allyson Felix	
2008	Bryan Clay	Stephanie Brown Trafton	
2009	Tyson Gay	Sanya Richards	
2010	David Oliver	Allyson Felix	
2011	Jesse Williams	Carmelita Jeter	
2012	Ashton Eaton	Allyson Felix	
Year	Jesse Owens Male Athlete of the Year	Jackie Joyner-Kersee Female Athlete of the Year	Ref.
2013	LaShawn Merritt	Brianna Rollins	
2014	Mebrahtom Keflezighi	Jennifer Simpson	
2015	Ashton Eaton	Allyson Felix	
2016	Matthew Centrowitz	Michelle Carter	
2017	Sam Kendricks	Emma Coburn	
2018	Noah Lyles	Shelby Houlihan	
2019	Donavan Brazier	Dalilah Muhammad	
2021	Ryan Crouser	Sydney McLaughlin	
2022	Noah Lyles	Sydney McLaughlin	
2023	Noah Lyles	Sha'Carri Richardson	
2024	Grant Holloway	Gabrielle Thomas	
2025	Rai Benjamin	Melissa Jefferson-Wooden	
