= Evelyn Ferrara =

American discus thrower (1909–1966)

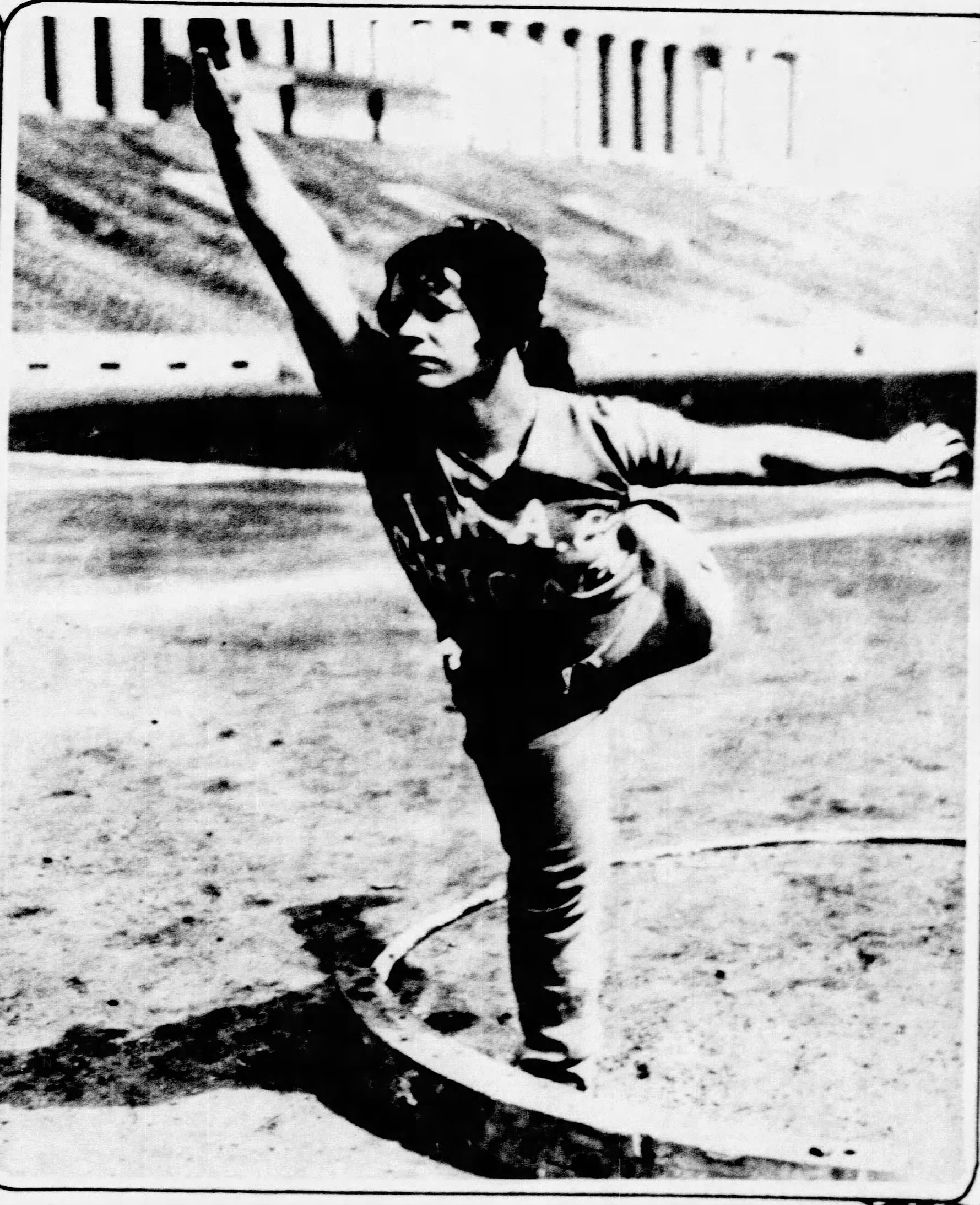
- Ferrara in 1929

Personal information
- Nationality: American
- Born: December 12, 1909
- Died: September 9, 1966 (aged 56)

Sport
- Sport: Athletics
- Event: Discus throw

Evelyn Ferrara (December 12, 1909 – September 9, 1966) was an American athlete. She competed in the women's discus throw at the 1936 Summer Olympics.
